= Vladimir Antipin =

Kazakh ice hockey player (born 1970)

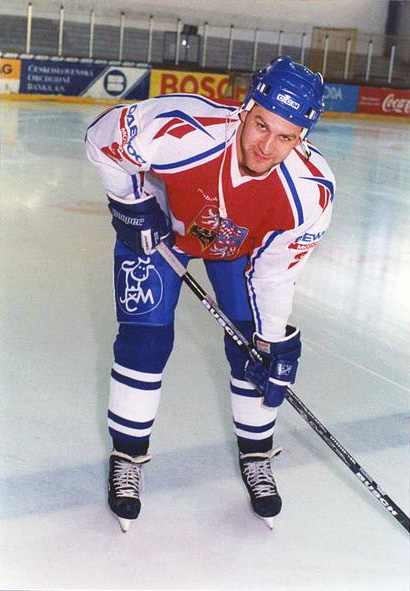
- Antipin with Ceske Budejovice in 1996
- Born: April 18, 1970 (age 54); Temirtau, Kazakh SSR, Soviet Union
- Height: 6 ft 2 in (188 cm)
- Weight: 203 lb (92 kg; 14 st 7 lb)
- Position: Defence
- Shot: Left
- Played for: Torpedo Ust-Kamenogorsk; Detroit Falcons; Ceske Budejovice; Metallurg Magnitogorsk; Lada Togliatti; Severstal Cherepovets; Metallurg Novokuznetsk; Avangard Omsk; Sibir Novosibirsk; Kazakhmys Karagandy; Mechel Chelyabinsk; Khimik Moscow Oblast; Amur Khabarovsk; Barys Astana
- National team: Kazakhstan
- NHL draft: Undrafted
- Playing career: 1988–2010

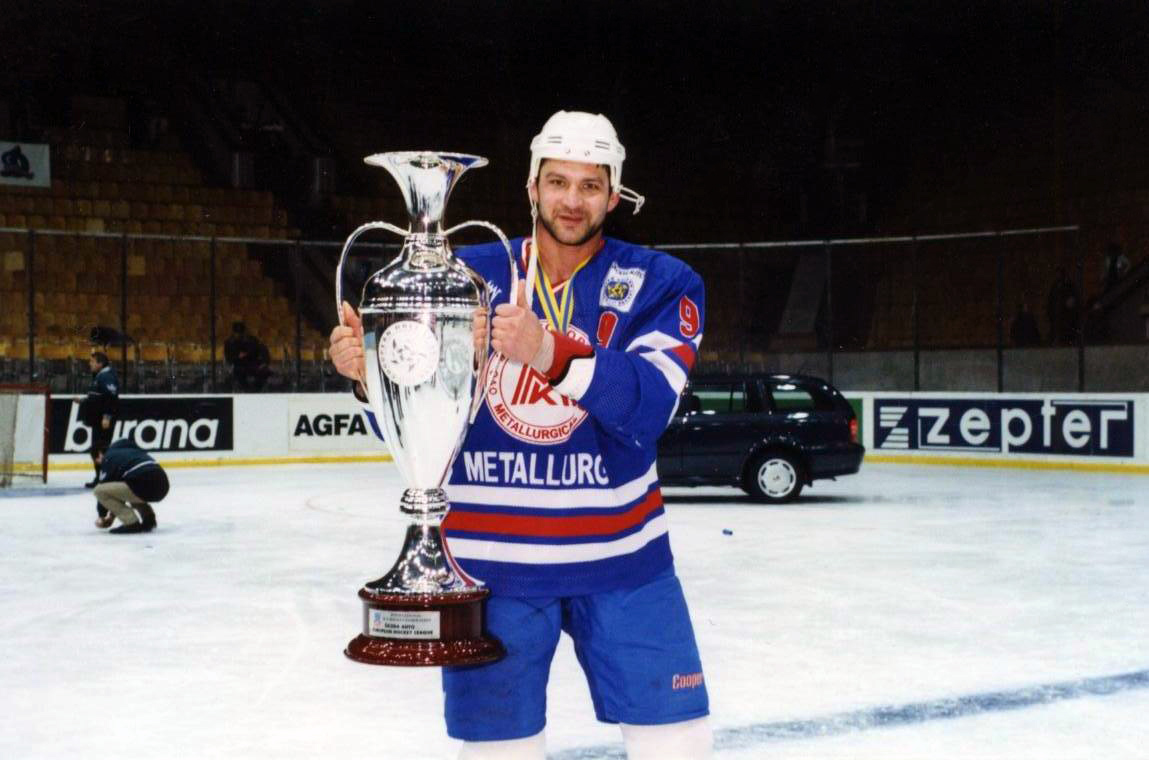
Antipin as a Metallurg Magnitogorsk player at the European Hockey League in 1999.

Vladimir Yurevich Antipin (Russian: Влади́мир Ю́рьевич Анти́пин; born April 18, 1970) is a former Kazakhstani professional ice hockey defenceman who participated at the 2010 IIHF World Championship and the 2006 Winter Olympics as a member of the Kazakhstan men's national ice hockey team. On September 15, 2012, Vladimir's wife was killed in an automobile accident in rural Kazakhstan. His son Viktor Antipin is also a hockey player, and played for the NHL's Buffalo Sabres. He is currently an ice hockey coach.

== Career statistics ==
=== Regular season and playoffs ===
| | | | Regular season | | | | | Playoffs |
| Season | Team | League | GP | G | A | Pts | PIM | GP | G | A | Pts | PIM |
|---|---|---|---|---|---|---|---|---|---|---|---|---|
| 1988–89 | Avtomobilist Karagandy | URS.2 | 7 | 0 | 3 | 3 | 8 | — | — | — | — | — |
| 1989–90 | SKA Novosibirsk | URS.2 | 49 | 0 | 2 | 2 | 22 | — | — | — | — | — |
| 1990–91 | Amurstal Komsomolsk–na–Amure | URS.4 | — | — | — | — | — | | 1 |
| 1991–92 | Torpedo Ust–Kamenogorsk | CIS | 36 | 3 | 3 | 6 | 24 | 6 | 0 | 0 | 0 | 2 |
| 1992–93 | Torpedo Ust–Kamenogorsk | IHL | 42 | 6 | 6 | 12 | 48 | 1 | 0 | 0 | 0 | 0 |
| 1993–94 | Detroit Falcons | CoHL | 59 | 11 | 24 | 35 | 57 | 3 | 0 | 1 | 1 | 2 |
| 1994–95 | Torpedo Ust–Kamenogorsk | IHL | 52 | 8 | 15 | 23 | 64 | 2 | 0 | 0 | 0 | 6 |
| 1995–96 | Torpedo Ust–Kamenogorsk | IHL | 47 | 13 | 11 | 24 | 96 | — | — | — | — | — |
| 1996–97 | HC České Budějovice | ELH | 40 | 1 | 3 | 4 | 48 | 5 | 0 | 0 | 0 | 4 |
| 1997–98 | Metallurg Magnitogorsk | RSL | 43 | 15 | 16 | 31 | 56 | 9 | 2 | 1 | 3 | 4 |
| 1998–99 | Metallurg Magnitogorsk | RSL | 39 | 5 | 10 | 15 | 44 | 16 | 1 | 2 | 3 | 61 |
| 1999–2000 | Metallurg Magnitogorsk | RSL | 24 | 4 | 2 | 6 | 16 | 9 | 1 | 2 | 3 | 12 |
| 2000–01 | Lada Togliatti | RSL | 43 | 4 | 11 | 15 | 28 | 5 | 0 | 0 | 0 | 6 |
| 2001–02 | Severstal Cherepovets | RSL | 39 | 2 | 5 | 7 | 50 | 3 | 1 | 0 | 1 | 4 |
| 2002–03 | Metallurg Novokuznetsk | RSL | 51 | 8 | 10 | 18 | 66 | — | — | — | — | — |
| 2003–04 | Avangard Omsk | RSL | 55 | 3 | 8 | 11 | 84 | 11 | 1 | 0 | 1 | 12 |
| 2004–05 | Sibir Novosibirsk | RSL | 29 | 0 | 5 | 5 | 57 | — | — | — | — | — |
| 2004–05 | Kazakhmys Karagandy | RUS.2 | 14 | 3 | 3 | 6 | 26 | — | — | — | — | — |
| 2004–05 | Mechel Chelyabinsk | RUS.2 | 6 | 1 | 1 | 2 | 6 | 5 | 1 | 1 | 2 | 10 |
| 2004–05 | Mechel–2 Chelyabinsk | RUS.3 | 2 | 0 | 0 | 0 | 2 | — | — | — | — | — |
| 2005–06 | Khimik Moscow Oblast | RSL | 20 | 1 | 3 | 4 | 20 | 6 | 0 | 0 | 0 | 4 |
| 2006–07 | Kazakhmys Satpaev | KAZ | 2 | 0 | 0 | 0 | 0 | — | — | — | — | — |
| 2006–07 | Kazakhmys Satpaev | RUS.2 | 16 | 1 | 6 | 7 | 52 | — | — | — | — | — |
| 2006–07 | Amur Khabarovsk | RSL | 28 | 6 | 6 | 12 | 42 | — | — | — | — | — |
| 2006–07 | Amur–2 Khabarovsk | RUS.3 | 1 | 0 | 0 | 0 | 4 | — | — | — | — | — |
| 2007–08 | Amur Khabarovsk | RSL | 45 | 3 | 6 | 9 | 61 | 1 | 0 | 0 | 0 | 0 |
| 2008–09 | Amur Khabarovsk | KHL | 48 | 9 | 5 | 14 | 85 | — | — | — | — | — |
| 2009–10 | Barys Astana | KHL | 22 | 0 | 3 | 3 | 26 | 2 | 0 | 0 | 0 | 0 |
| 2009–10 | Barys–2 Astana | KAZ | 2 | 1 | 0 | 1 | 0 | — | — | — | — | — |
| IHL totals | | | 141 | 27 | 32 | 59 | 208 | 3 | 0 | 1 | 1 | 8 |
| RSL totals | | | 416 | 51 | 82 | 133 | 524 | 60 | 6 | 4 | 10 | 101 |

=== International ===
| Year | Team | Event | GP | G | A | Pts | PIM |
|---|---|---|---|---|---|---|---|
| 1992 | Kazakhstan | WC C Q | 2 | 0 | 0 | 0 | 4 |
| 1993 | Kazakhstan | WC C | 7 | 2 | 2 | 4 | 19 |
| 1995 | Kazakhstan | WC C | 4 | 0 | 1 | 1 | 20 |
| 1996 | Kazakhstan | WC C | 7 | 1 | 2 | 3 | 4 |
| 1997 | Kazakhstan | WC B | 7 | 2 | 0 | 2 | 8 |
| 1998 | Kazakhstan | OG | 7 | 1 | 1 | 2 | 4 |
| 1998 | Kazakhstan | WC | 3 | 0 | 0 | 0 | 4 |
| 2004 | Kazakhstan | WC | 6 | 0 | 1 | 1 | 4 |
| 2005 | Kazakhstan | OGQ | 3 | 0 | 0 | 0 | 0 |
| 2005 | Kazakhstan | WC | 6 | 0 | 1 | 1 | 4 |
| 2006 | Kazakhstan | OG | 5 | 1 | 0 | 1 | 4 |
| 2009 | Kazakhstan | OGQ | 3 | 0 | 2 | 2 | 2 |
| 2009 | Kazakhstan | WC D1 | 5 | 0 | 2 | 2 | 4 |
| 2010 | Kazakhstan | WC | 6 | 1 | 0 | 1 | 4 |
| Senior totals | | | 71 | 8 | 12 | 20 | 85 |
