= Roman Kukhtinov =

Russian ice hockey player

- Born: December 1, 1975 (age 50) Belgorod, Soviet Union
- Height: 6 ft 0 in (183 cm)
- Weight: 207 lb (94 kg; 14 st 11 lb)
- Position: Defence
- Shot: Left
- KHL team Former teams: HC Amur Khabarovsk; Krylya Sovetov Moscow; SKA Saint Petersburg; HC Neftekhimik Nizhnekamsk; Metallurg Novokuznetsk; Salavat Yulaev Ufa; Severstal Cherepovets; Metallurg Magnitogorsk; HC Spartak Moscow; HC CSKA Moscow
- NHL draft: 280th overall, 2001; New York Islanders
- Playing career: 1993–2011

Roman Kukhtinov (born December 1, 1975) is a Russian ice hockey defender who is currently playing for HC Amur Khabarovsk of the Kontinental Hockey League.

Kukhtinov has played for numerous Russian teams during his career. He began his career with short spells for Krylya Sovetov Moscow, SKA Saint Petersburg and HC Neftekhimik Nizhnekamsk. In 1998 he signed for Metallurg Novokuznetsk where he began playing more frequent hockey and spent a total of three seasons with the team. Kukhtinov was drafted 280th overall by the New York Islanders in the 2001 NHL entry draft but remained in the Russian Superleague and instead signed for Salavat Yulaev Ufa where he scored career-high 11 goals during his first season. After two seasons he moved to Severstal Cherepovets for one season before moving to Metallurg Magnitogorsk where he won the Russian Championship in 2006. He rejoined Salavat for the 2006–07 season before moving to HC Spartak Moscow. He joined HC CSKA Moscow for the inaugural KHL season but after 14 games he moved to Amur Khabarovsk.

== Career statistics ==
=== Regular season and playoffs ===
			Regular season					Playoffs
Season	Team	League	GP	G	A	Pts	PIM	GP	G	A	Pts	PIM
1991–92	Dynamo–2 Moscow	CIS.3	2	0	0	0	2	—	—	—	—	—
1992–93	Krylia Sovetov–2 Moscow	RUS.2	58	5	4	9	22	—	—	—	—	—
1993–94	Krylia Sovetov Moscow	IHL	4	0	0	0	2	—	—	—	—	—
1993–94	Krylia Sovetov–2 Moscow	RUS.3	54	3	9	12	38	—	—	—	—	—
1994–95	SKA St. Petersburg	IHL	5	1	0	1	2	—	—	—	—	—
1994–95	SKA–2 St. Petersburg	RUS.2	3	0	1	1	0	—	—	—	—	—
1995–96	Neftekhimik Nizhnekamsk	IHL	7	0	0	0	6	—	—	—	—	—
1995–96	Neftekhimik–2 Nizhnekamsk	RUS.2	3	1	0	1	0	—	—	—	—	—
1995–96	Gornyak Raychikhinsk	RUS.2	27	1	5	6	16	—	—	—	—	—
1996–97	Gornyak Raychikhinsk	RUS.3	49	15	14	29	26	—	—	—	—	—
1997–98	Gornyak Raychikhinsk	RUS.3	36	18	8	26	46	—	—	—	—	—
1998–99	Metallurg Novokuznetsk	RSL	42	2	9	11	26	6	0	0	0	2
1999–2000	Metallurg Novokuznetsk	RSL	37	2	6	8	28	14	1	1	2	8
2000–01	Metallurg Novokuznetsk	RSL	44	7	10	17	36	—	—	—	—	—
2000–01	Metallurg–2 Novokuznetsk	RUS.3	1	0	0	0	4	—	—	—	—	—
2001–02	Salavat Yulaev Ufa	RSL	51	11	10	21	74	—	—	—	—	—
2002–03	Salavat Yulaev Ufa	RSL	50	4	7	11	72	3	2	0	2	4
2003–04	Severstal Cherepovets	RSL	54	2	6	8	46	—	—	—	—	—
2004–05	Metallurg Magnitogorsk	RSL	53	3	8	11	24	5	0	0	0	2
2005–06	Metallurg Magnitogorsk	RSL	32	0	4	4	18	—	—	—	—	—
2006–07	Salavat Yulaev Ufa	RSL	47	2	5	7	30	8	0	0	0	4
2007–08	Spartak Moscow	RSL	53	4	7	11	34	5	0	0	0	4
2007–08	Spartak–2 Moscow	RUS.3	1	2	0	2	0	—	—	—	—	—
2008–09	CSKA Moscow	KHL	14	0	3	3	14	—	—	—	—	—
2008–09	CSKA–2 Moscow	RUS.3	4	0	1	1	4	—	—	—	—	—
2008–09	Amur Khabarovsk	KHL	25	2	3	5	16	—	—	—	—	—
2009–10	Amur Khabarovsk	KHL	31	0	3	3	32	—	—	—	—	—
2010–11	HC Belgorod	RUS.3	41	7	17	24	34	10	2	6	8	2
RSL totals			463	37	72	109	388	41	3	1	4	24
RUS.3 totals			186	45	49	94	152	10	2	6	8	2

=== International ===
Year	Team	Event	GP	G	A	Pts	PIM
1993	Russia	EJC	6	0	0	0	0
Junior totals			6	0	0	0	0
