= Valery Belousov =

Russian ice hockey player and coach

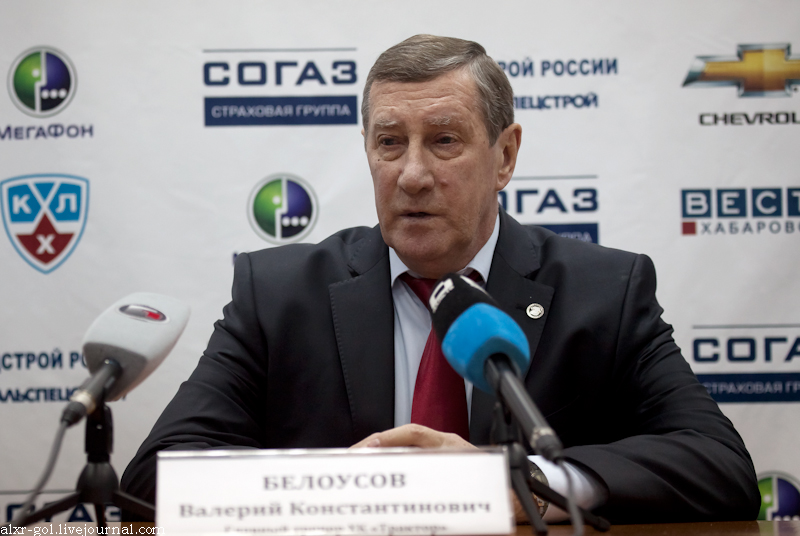
- Born: 17 December 1948 Novouralsk, Sverdlovsk Oblast, RSFSR
- Died: 16 April 2015 (aged 66) Chelyabinsk, Russia
- Position: Right wing
- Shot: Left
- Played for: Sputnik Nizhny Tagil; Traktor Chelyabinsk; Oji Eagles; Metallurg Magnitogorsk
- Playing career: 1964–1986

Valery Konsantinovich Belousov (Russian: Валерий Константинович Белоусов; 17 December 1948 – 16 April 2015) was a Russian professional ice hockey coach and player.

== Playing career ==
Belousov began playing hockey on a local Novouralsk team Kedr in 1964. In 1967 he was transferred to Sputnik Nizhny Tagil ultimately making his way to Traktor Chelyabinsk, Ural's premier hockey team, in 1971. During his 418-game stint in Chelyabinsk Belousov advanced with his team to the 1973 USSR Cup finals and was a bronze medalist in 1977 as part of the squad. Despite being one of the top snipers of the Soviet Championship he had a modest career on the Soviet national team where he spent only 8 games scoring a single goal.

He spent 1982—1984 seasons in Oji Seishi Tomakomai of the Japan Ice Hockey League winning the Japanese championship twice. Belousov finished his career playing for Metallurg Magnitogorsk, then a de facto farm team of Traktor, retiring as a player in 1987.

== Coaching career ==
Belousov returned to Chelyabinsk in 1987 as an assistant coach. He replaced Gennadi Tsygurov as the head coach in 1990 and eventually led the team to its first bronze medals since the late 70s. In 1995 he was invited back to Magnitogorsk as an assist coach to Valery Postnikov and then replaced him as the head coach in 1996. Helmed by Belousov Metallurg Magnitogorsk achieved its biggest success with two Russian Superleague championships and the 2000 IIHF Super Cup.

In the 2003-04 season he took over Avangard Omsk and headed the team to its first ever champion title winning in the finals over his former team Metallurg. A year later Belousov's Avangard also won the 2005 IIHF European Champions Cup. But after several not so stellar seasons Belousov was fired of his job along with his entire coaching stuff.

During the 2008—2010 seasons Belousov tried to recapture his success with Metallurg Magnitogorsk. But despite advancing to the 2008 Victoria Cup with New York Rangers and 2009 Champions Hockey League Finals with ZSC Lions Belousov's team lost both games.

In October 2010 he returned to Traktor Chelyabinsk for the first time in 15 years leading the team from the bottom of the season table to the 2013 Gagarin Cup Final.

He died of cardiopulmonary failure on 16 April 2015.

== Career statistics ==
=== Coaching record ===
Team	League	Year	Regular season								Postseason
Team	League	Year	G	W	OTW	T	OTL	L	Pts	Finish	Result
TRK	USSR	1990–91	56	27	–	9	–	20	63	2nd in relegation round	No playoffs held
TRK	CIS	1991–92	36	16	–	6	–	14	38	3rd in Group B	Won 5th place game (TOR)
TRK	IIHL	1992–93	42	28	–	5	–	9	61	2nd in East	Lost in Semifinals (DYN)
TRK	IIHL	1993–94	46	32	–	3	–	11	67	3rd overall	No playoffs held
TRK	IIHL	1994–95	52	26	–	5	–	21	57	5th in East	Lost in First Round (TOR)
MMG	RSL	1996–97	24	14	–	3	–	7	31	4th overall	Lost in Semifinals (LAD)
MMG	RSL	1997–98	46	31	–	10	–	5	72	2nd overall	No playoffs held
MMG	RSL	1998–99	42	34	–	6	–	2	74	1st overall	Won Russian Championship (DYN)
MMG	RSL	1999–00	38	24	1	3	1	9	78	3rd overall	Lost in Semifinals (AKB)
MMG	RSL	2000–01	44	24	3	8	1	8	87	1st overall	Won Russian Championship (AVG)
MMG	RSL	2001–02	51	28	3	2	3	15	95	5th overall	Lost in Semifinals (LOK)
MMG	RSL	2002–03	51	23	2	8	4	14	85	6th overall	Lost in Quarterfinals (SEV)
AVG	RSL	2003–04	44	24	2	9	2	7	87	3rd overall	Won Russian Championship (MMG)
AVG	RSL	2004–05	60	29	3	10	1	17	104	6th overall	Lost in Semifinals (DYN)
AVG	RSL	2005–06	51	26	3	6	3	13	93	4th overall	Lost in Finals (AKB)
AVG	RSL	2006–07	54	32	3	6	2	11	110	2nd overall	Lost in Semifinals (MMG)
AVG	RSL	2007–08	38	14	6	–	1	17	55	Fired	–
MMG	KHL	2008–09	56	25	13	–	3	15	104	2nd in Tarasov	Lost in Semifinals (LOK)
MMG	KHL	2009–10	56	34	6	–	1	15	115	1st in Kharlamov	Lost in Conference Semifinals (AKB)
TRK	KHL	2010–11	44	12	7	–	6	19	56	5th in Kharlamov	Missed playoffs
TRK	KHL	2011–12	54	32	7	–	4	11	114	Won Continental Cup	Lost in Conference Finals (AVG)
TRK	KHL	2012–13	52	28	3	–	8	13	98	2nd in Kharlamov	Lost in Finals (DYN)

Preceded by Andrei Sidorenko	Head Coach of Traktor Chelyabinsk; 2010–2014	Succeeded by Karri Kivi
Preceded by Valery Postnikov	Head Coach of Metallurg Magnitogorsk; 2008–2010	Succeeded by Kari Heikkilä
Preceded by Sergei Gersonsky	Head Coach of Avangard Omsk; 2003–2007	Succeeded by Sergei Gersonsky
Preceded by Valery Postnikov	Head Coach of Metallurg Magnitogorsk; 1996–2003	Succeeded by Marek Sýkora
Preceded by Gennadi Tsygurov	Head Coach of Traktor Chelyabinsk; 1990–1995	Succeeded by Anatoly Kartaev
