= Sergey Gomolyako =

Russian ice hockey player (born 1970)

- Born: January 19, 1970 (age 56) Chelyabinsk, Soviet Union
- Height: 6 ft 3 in (191 cm)
- Weight: 265 lb (120 kg; 18 st 13 lb)
- Position: Right wing
- Shot: Left
- Played for: Metallurg Chelyabinsk; Traktor Chelyabinsk; Metallurg Magnitogorsk; Lada Togliatti; Severstal Cherepovets; Khimik Voskresensk; Mechel Chelyabinsk; Salavat Yulaev Ufa
- National team: Soviet Union and Russia
- NHL draft: 189th overall, 1989; Calgary Flames
- Playing career: 1986–2006

Sergey Yuryevich Gomolyako (Russian: Серге́й Ю́рьевич Гомоля́ко; born January 19, 1970, in Chelyabinsk, RSFSR, USSR) is a Russian former professional ice hockey player. He played as a forward.

He was part of the Soviet national team that won the 1989 World Junior Ice Hockey Championships. He also won back-to-back European Hockey League titles with Metallurg Magnitogorsk in 1998–99 and 1999–2000. For his accomplishments, he was given the title of Master of Sports, International Class, by his native country.

During his playing days, Gomolyako's skills were often contrasted with his unusual, rotund physique, which was the product of chronic metabolic issues rather than poor conditioning.

Since 2006, he has been working as a coach.

== Career statistics ==
			Regular season					Playoffs
Season	Team	League	GP	G	A	Pts	PIM	GP	G	A	Pts	PIM
1986–87	Metallurg Chelyabinsk	Soviet2	33	6	5	11	24	—	—	—	—	—
1987–88	Metallurg Chelyabinsk	Soviet2	27	15	14	29	40	—	—	—	—	—
1987–88	Traktor Chelyabinsk	Soviet	21	2	4	6	12	—	—	—	—	—
1988–89	Traktor Chelyabinsk	Soviet	24	8	4	12	10	—	—	—	—	—
1989–90	Traktor Chelyabinsk	Soviet	—	—	—	—	—	—	—	—	—	—
1990–91	Traktor Chelyabinsk	Soviet	26	9	7	16	34	—	—	—	—	—
1991–92	Traktor Chelyabinsk	Soviet	30	5	10	15	18	8	1	2	3	9
1991–92	Mechel Chelyabinsk	Soviet2	9	2	4	6	6	—	—	—	—	—
1992–93	Traktor Chelyabinsk	Russia	39	13	19	32	48	8	1	3	4	14
1993–94	Traktor Chelyabinsk	Russia	29	16	11	27	36	—	—	—	—	—
1994–95	Traktor Chelyabinsk	Russia	23	10	24	34	54	3	1	3	4	30
1995–96	Metallurg Magnitogorsk	Russia	47	12	10	22	49	10	4	5	9	16
1995–96	Metallurg Magnitogorsk-2	Russia2	1	1	0	1	2	—	—	—	—	—
1996–97	Metallurg Magnitogorsk	Russia	43	15	21	36	34	11	3	2	5	16
1997–98	Metallurg Magnitogorsk	Russia	35	11	12	23	20	9	4	7	11	6
1998–99	Metallurg Magnitogorsk	Russia	37	11	7	18	28	16	4	5	9	12
1999–00	Metallurg Magnitogorsk	Russia	34	9	8	17	22	12	4	6	10	10
2000–01	Lada Togliatti	Russia	41	10	11	21	41	2	0	0	0	2
2001–02	Severstal Cherepovets	Russia	7	0	0	0	4	—	—	—	—	—
2001–02	Severstal Cherepovets-2	Russia3	2	1	3	4	0	—	—	—	—	—
2001–02	Khimik Voskresensk	Russia2	25	6	3	9	12	13	3	4	7	8
2002–03	Mechel Chelyabinsk	Russia	29	5	11	16	16	—	—	—	—	—
2002–03	Metallurg Magnitogorsk	Russia	18	2	4	6	8	2	0	2	2	4
2003–04	Salavat Yulaev Ufa	Russia	53	10	12	22	53	—	—	—	—	—
2003–04	Salavat Yulaev Ufa-2	Russia3	3	1	5	6	0	—	—	—	—	—
2004–05	Mechel Chelyabinsk	Russia2	44	24	15	39	71	6	4	3	7	4
2005–06	Mechel Chelyabinsk	Russia2	21	5	16	21	55	—	—	—	—	—
Russia totals			435	124	150	274	413	73	21	33	54	110
