= Dmitri Filimonov =

Russian ice hockey player (1971–2024)

- Born: 14 October 1971 Perm, Russian SFSR, USSR
- Died: July or August 2024 (aged 52)
- Height: 6 ft 5 in (196 cm)
- Weight: 238 lb (108 kg; 17 st 0 lb)
- Position: Defence
- Shot: Right
- Played for: Ottawa Senators; Dynamo Moscow; KalPa; Molot-Prikamye Perm
- National team: Soviet Union
- NHL draft: 49th overall, 1991; Winnipeg Jets
- Playing career: 1990–2006
Medal record
Men's ice hockey
Representing Soviet Union
European Junior Championships
Gold medal – first place	1989 Soviet Union	Team

Dmitri Olegovich Filimonov (Russian: Дмитрий Олегович Филимонов; 14 October 1971 – July or August 2024) was a Russian professional ice hockey defenceman. He played 30 games in the National Hockey League with the Ottawa Senators during the 1993–94 season. The rest of his career, which lasted from 1990 to 2006, was mainly spent in the Russian Superleague with Molot-Prikamye Perm. Internationally Filimonov played for the Soviet national team at the 1991 Canada Cup. On 1 August 2024, it was announced that Filimonov had died at the age of 52.

== Playing career ==
Filimonov was drafted 49th overall by Winnipeg Jets in the 1991 NHL entry draft, but remained in Russia with HC Dynamo Moscow and his rights were eventually traded to Ottawa Senators in March 1993. He went on to play 30 regular season games with the Sens, scoring a goal and four assists for five points and collecting 18 penalty minutes during the 1993–94 NHL season, splitting the season between Ottawa and their AHL affiliate the Prince Edward Island Senators. He played one more season with P.E.I. before moving to the IHL with Indianapolis Ice, but was hampered by injuries and only managed to play ten games. After one season in Finland for KalPa, Filimonov returned to Russia in 1997 to play for his hometown team Molot-Prikamye Perm, where he remained until he retired from hockey in 2006.

== Career statistics ==
=== Regular season and playoffs ===
			Regular season					Playoffs
Season	Team	League	GP	G	A	Pts	PIM	GP	G	A	Pts	PIM
1988–89	Molot Perm	USSR.2	12	2	1	3	4	—	—	—	—	—
1989–90	Molot Perm	USSR.2	65	3	6	9	34	—	—	—	—	—
1990–91	Dynamo Moscow	USSR	45	4	6	10	12	—	—	—	—	—
1991–92	Dynamo Moscow	CIS	31	1	2	3	10	7	2	0	2	2
1992–93	Dynamo Moscow	IHL	42	2	3	5	30	10	1	2	3	2
1993–94	Ottawa Senators	NHL	30	1	4	5	18	—	—	—	—	—
1993–94	Prince Edward Island Senators	AHL	48	10	16	26	14	—	—	—	—	—
1994–95	Prince Edward Island Senators	AHL	32	6	19	25	14	9	0	1	1	2
1995–96	Indianapolis Ice	IHL	10	0	0	1	12	—	—	—	—	—
1996–97	KalPa	SM-l	27	2	1	3	12	—	—	—	—	—
1997–98	Molot-Prikamye Perm	RSL	45	9	10	19	30	—	—	—	—	—
1998–99	Molot-Prikamye Perm	RSL	42	4	10	14	20	6	1	0	1	0
1999–00	Molot-Prikamye Perm	RSL	37	8	6	14	26	—	—	—	—	—
2000–01	Molot-Prikamye Perm	RSL	42	10	10	20	47	—	—	—	—	—
2001–02	Molot-Prikamye Perm	RSL	43	3	1	4	48	—	—	—	—	—
2002–03	Molot-Prikamye Perm	RSL	40	2	4	6	36	—	—	—	—	—
2003–04	Molot-Prikamye Perm	RUS.2	44	5	10	15	20	13	2	3	5	8
2004–05	Molot-Prikamye Perm	RSL	51	4	4	8	36	—	—	—	—	—
2005–06	Molot-Prikamye Perm	RSL	49	4	6	10	36	—	—	—	—	—
RSL totals			392	46	54	100	313	28	2	4	6	8
NHL totals			30	1	4	5	18	—	—	—	—	—

=== International ===
Year	Team	Event	GP	G	A	Pts	PIM
1989	Soviet Union	EJC	6	3	0	3	0
1991	Soviet Union	CC	5	0	0	0	0
Junior totals			6	3	0	3	0
Senior totals			5	0	0	0	0
