= Egor Shastin =

Ukrainian-Russian ice hockey player

- Born: September 10, 1982 (age 43) Kiev, Ukraine, Soviet Union
- Height: 5 ft 10 in (178 cm)
- Weight: 181 lb (82 kg; 12 st 13 lb)
- Position: Forward
- Shot: Left
- KHL team: Torpedo Nizhny Novgorod
- NHL draft: 124th overall, 2001; Calgary Flames
- Playing career: 1999–2017

Yehor Yevhenovych "Egor" Shastin (Ukrainian: Єгор Євгенович Шастін, born September 10, 1982) is a Ukrainian-Russian professional ice hockey player who is currently playing for Torpedo Nizhny Novgorod in the Kontinental Hockey League (KHL). He was selected by Calgary Flames in the 4th round (124th overall) of the 2001 NHL entry draft.

== Career statistics ==
=== Regular season and playoffs ===
			Regular season					Playoffs
Season	Team	League	GP	G	A	Pts	PIM	GP	G	A	Pts	PIM
1997–98	Avangard–2 Omsk	RUS.3	4	0	1	1	0	—	—	—	—	—
1998–99	Avangard Omsk	RSL	4	0	0	0	0	4	0	1	1	0
1998–99	Avangard–VDV Omsk	RUS.3	19	11	17	28	30	—	—	—	—	—
1999–2000	Avangard Omsk	RSL	28	2	4	6	20	7	3	1	4	16
1999–2000	Avangard–VDV Omsk	RUS.3	11	6	5	11	20	—	—	—	—	—
2000–01	Avangard Omsk	RSL	35	3	11	14	59	9	1	0	1	18
2000–01	Avangard–VDV Omsk	RUS.3	1	1	0	1	2	—	—	—	—	—
2001–02	Avangard Omsk	RSL	26	2	5	7	10	11	1	0	1	8
2001–02	Avangard–VDV Omsk	RUS.3	4	3	2	5	0	—	—	—	—	—
2002–03	Avangard–VDV Omsk	RUS.3	4	2	4	6	30	—	—	—	—	—
2002–03	HC Ambrì–Piotta	NLA	44	2	3	5	18	3	1	0	1	2
2002–03	HC Sierre	SUI.2	2	1	0	1	0	—	—	—	—	—
2003–04	Sibir Novosibirsk	RSL	57	7	5	12	28	—	—	—	—	—
2003–04	Sibir–2 Novosibirsk	RUS.3	1	0	2	2	0	—	—	—	—	—
2004–05	Avangard Omsk	RSL	7	0	0	0	2	—	—	—	—	—
2004–05	Omskie Yastreby	RUS.3	2	1	0	1	0	—	—	—	—	—
2004–05	SKA St. Petersburg	RSL	21	3	3	6	12	—	—	—	—	—
2004–05	SKA–2 St. Petersburg	RUS.3	6	4	3	7	35	—	—	—	—	—
2005–06	Neftekhimik Nizhnekamsk	RSL	30	1	3	4	22	—	—	—	—	—
2005–06	Neftekhimik–2 Nizhnekamsk	RUS.3	3	6	4	10	4	—	—	—	—	—
2005–06	Torpedo Nizhny Novgorod	RUS.2	6	4	1	5	2	6	1	5	6	4
2005–06	Torpedo–2 Nizhny Novgorod	RUS.3	3	3	3	6	2	—	—	—	—	—
2006–07	Torpedo Nizhny Novgorod	RUS.2	39	19	18	37	54	13	11	4	15	8
2006–07	Torpedo–2 Nizhny Novgorod	RUS.3	2	3	2	5	6	—	—	—	—	—
2007–08	Torpedo Nizhny Novgorod	RSL	54	8	16	24	36	—	—	—	—	—
2007–08	Torpedo–2 Nizhny Novgorod	RUS.3	1	2	5	7	0	—	—	—	—	—
2008–09	Torpedo Nizhny Novgorod	KHL	56	19	22	41	38	3	0	1	1	4
2008–09	Torpedo–2 Nizhny Novgorod	RUS.3	—	—	—	—	—	2	1	2	3	0
2009–10	Torpedo Nizhny Novgorod	KHL	46	11	10	21	88	—	—	—	—	—
2010–11	Torpedo Nizhny Novgorod	KHL	39	4	10	14	20	—	—	—	—	—
2011–12	Lada Togliatti	VHL	42	16	14	30	44	4	0	1	1	2
2012–13	Lada Togliatti	VHL	1	0	1	1	2	—	—	—	—	—
2013–14	HC Red Ice	SUI.2	20	6	10	16	6	4	0	0	0	2
2014–15	Saryarka Karagandy	VHL	47	20	16	36	39	17	6	10	16	18
2015–16	Toros Neftekamsk	VHL	45	5	12	17	12	12	4	1	5	6
2016–17	Torpedo Ust–Kamenogorsk	VHL	7	1	2	3	2	—	—	—	—	—
2016–17	ShKO Oskemen	KAZ	23	7	7	14	4	—	—	—	—	—
2016–17	Kulager Petropavl	KAZ	20	3	4	7	12	5	1	2	3	6
RSL totals			262	26	47	73	189	31	5	2	7	42
KHL totals			141	34	42	76	146	3	0	1	1	4
RUS.2 & VHL totals			187	65	64	129	155	52	22	21	43	38

=== International ===
Year	Team	Event	GP	G	A	Pts	PIM
2000	Russia	WJC18	6	7	4	11	4
2001	Russia	WJC	7	2	2	4	35
Junior totals			13	9	6	15	39
