= Denis Platonov =

Russian ice hockey player

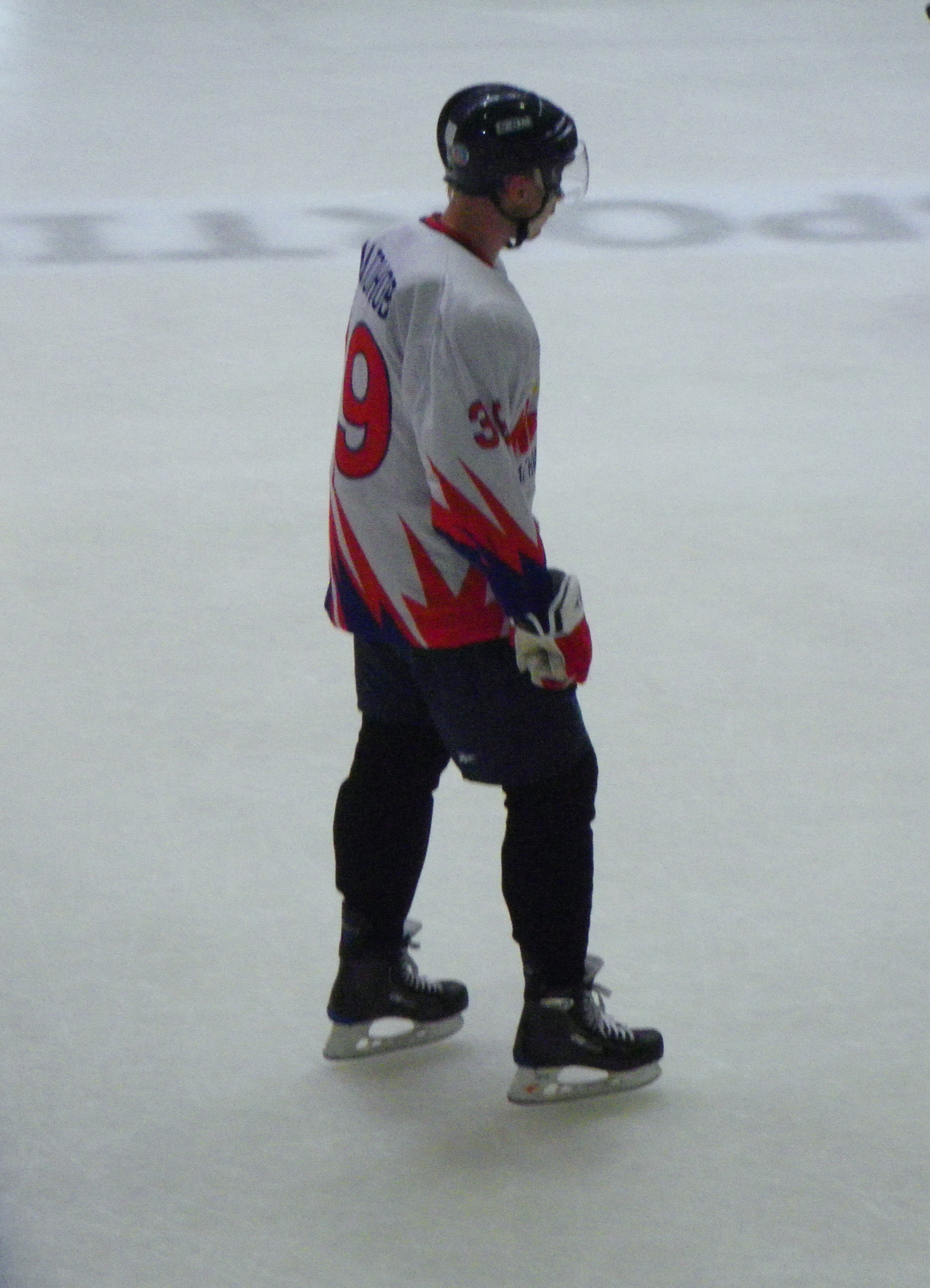
- Born: 6 November 1981 (age 44) Saratov, Russian SFSR, Soviet Union
- Height: 6 ft 4 in (193 cm)
- Weight: 198 lb (90 kg; 14 st 2 lb)
- Position: Centre
- Shot: Left
- Played for: Ak Bars Kazan; Milwaukee Admirals; Neftekhimik Nizhnekamsk; Metallurg Magnitogorsk; Avangard Omsk; Salavat Yulaev Ufa
- NHL draft: 75th overall, 2001; Nashville Predators
- Playing career: 1998–2019

Denis Platonov (born 6 November 1981) is a Russian former professional ice hockey centre who most notably played for Metallurg Magnitogorsk of the Kontinental Hockey League (KHL). He was selected by the Nashville Predators in the 3rd round (75th overall) of the 2001 NHL entry draft.

Following the completion of the 2018–19 season with Metallurg Magnitogorsk, limited to just 24 games through injury, Platonov ended his 21-year professional career, with an interest to pursue coaching.

== Awards and honours ==
Award	Year	Ref
RSL
Champion	2007	
KHL
Gagarin Cup champion	2014, 2016	

== Career statistics ==
			Regular season					Playoffs
Season	Team	League	GP	G	A	Pts	PIM	GP	G	A	Pts	PIM
1997–98	Kristall–2 Saratov	RUS.3	20	4	2	6	34	—	—	—	—	—
1997–98	Lada–2 Togliatti	RUS.3	14	1	1	2	14	—	—	—	—	—
1998–99	Lada–2 Togliatti	RUS.3	20	4	3	7	10	—	—	—	—	—
1998–99	Kristall Saratov	RUS.2	14	1	0	1	61	—	—	—	—	—
1999–2000	Kristall Saratov	RUS.2	27	7	3	10	54	—	—	—	—	—
1999–2000	Kristall–2 Saratov	RUS.3	5	0	0	0	37	—	—	—	—	—
2000–01	Kristall Saratov	RUS.2	39	11	6	17	32	13	3	0	3	43
2000–01	Kristall–2 Saratov	RUS.3	3	2	3	5	0	—	—	—	—	—
2001–02	Kristall Saratov	RUS.2	50	18	14	32	96	—	—	—	—	—
2002–03	Ak Bars Kazan	RSL	47	8	9	17	49	5	0	0	0	2
2003–04	Milwaukee Admirals	AHL	3	0	0	0	0	—	—	—	—	—
2003–04	Ak Bars Kazan	RSL	28	5	3	8	18	8	1	0	1	2
2003–04	Ak Bars–2 Kazan	RUS.3	2	2	2	4	0	—	—	—	—	—
2004–05	Ak Bars Kazan	RSL	38	3	7	10	10	—	—	—	—	—
2004–05	Neftekhimik Nizhnekamsk	RSL	11	3	1	4	34	3	0	1	1	2
2005–06	Metallurg Magnitogorsk	RSL	49	11	8	19	60	8	4	0	4	6
2006–07	Metallurg Magnitogorsk	RSL	53	17	8	25	87	14	5	3	8	14
2007–08	Metallurg Magnitogorsk	RSL	57	16	11	27	76	13	3	4	7	16
2008–09	Metallurg Magnitogorsk	KHL	55	15	12	27	91	12	3	6	9	12
2009–10	Metallurg Magnitogorsk	KHL	56	13	13	26	64	10	3	1	4	12
2010–11	Metallurg Magnitogorsk	KHL	49	20	9	29	60	20	7	2	9	14
2011–12	Avangard Omsk	KHL	22	1	10	11	12	—	—	—	—	—
2011–12	Salavat Yulaev Ufa	KHL	20	2	3	5	10	6	0	0	0	2
2012–13	Metallurg Magnitogorsk	KHL	50	9	12	21	55	7	0	3	3	0
2013–14	Metallurg Magnitogorsk	KHL	47	7	5	12	43	21	1	1	2	28
2014–15	Metallurg Magnitogorsk	KHL	55	9	12	21	28	10	0	0	0	8
2015–16	Metallurg Magnitogorsk	KHL	60	4	4	8	4	23	2	1	3	12
2016–17	Metallurg Magnitogorsk	KHL	51	4	6	10	12	18	2	3	5	8
2017–18	Metallurg Magnitogorsk	KHL	46	2	5	7	20	11	1	0	1	0
2018–19	Metallurg Magnitogorsk	KHL	24	2	6	8	12	6	1	0	1	2
RSL totals			283	63	47	110	334	51	13	8	21	42
KHL totals			535	89	96	185	411	144	20	17	37	98
