= Silver Stone Trophy =

The Silver Stone Trophy was originally designed and produced for the now defunct European Hockey League (1997–2000) by Italian artist Enzo Bosi. It weighs seven kilograms in silver chisel, equivalent to one British stone, hence the name The Silver Stone. From 2005 until 2008, it was awarded to the winner of the IIHF European Champions Cup, with the winning team receiving a 1:1 replica of the trophy. In 2009, it was awarded to the winner of the Champions Hockey League.

== Winners of the Silver Stone Trophy ==
European Hockey League

- 1997 HC TPS (Finland)
- 1998 VEU Feldkirch (Austria)
- 1999 Metallurg Magnitogorsk (Russia)
- 2000 Metallurg Magnitogorsk (Russia)

European Champions Cup

- 2005 Avangard Omsk (Russia)
- 2006 Dynamo Moscow (Russia)
- 2007 Ak Bars Kazan (Russia)
- 2008 Metallurg Magnitogorsk (Russia)

Champions Hockey League

- 2009 ZSC Lions (Switzerland)
