= Ilya Vorobiev =

Russian and German ice hockey player

- Born: March 16, 1975 (age 51) Riga, Latvian SSR, Soviet Union
- Height: 6 ft 0 in (183 cm)
- Weight: 194 lb (88 kg; 13 st 12 lb)
- Position: Forward
- Shot: Right
- Played for: HC Dynamo Moscow; Frankfurt Lions; Krefeld Pinguine; Adler Mannheim; HC Lada Togliatti; Metallurg Magnitogorsk; Khimik Mytishchi
- Current KHL coach: HC CSKA Moscow
- Coached for: Metallurg Magnitogorsk; SKA Saint Petersburg
- Playing career: 1991–2010
- Coaching career: 2010–present

Ilya Petrovich Vorobiev (Russian: Илья Петрович Воробьёв; born 16 March 1975) is a Russian and German retired ice hockey player who is the current head coach of CSKA Moscow.

Born in Riga, Vorobiev is the eldest son of the former hockey player and current hockey coach Petr Vorobiev. After 18 years in Germany, he then played for Russia. He finished his career with the Frankfurt Lions (2007—2010).

Vorobiev has been involved with the junior and youth teams of Russia. He participated twice in the all-star game of the German Hockey League (1999, 2001). He was a silver medalist of the 2002 German championships as part of the Adler Mannheim. Besides that, Vorobiev was part of the Russian team Metallurg Magnitogorsk, which won the 2007 Russian Superleague.

After retiring for some time, he carried out administrative work for the Russian team. In the 2011–12 season, he debuted as a coach. On 3 May 2012, he was appointed the senior coach of the hockey club Metallurg Magnitogorsk. On 17 October 2015, he was appointed head coach.

On 19 April 2016, in his first season as coach, he led the team to victory in the Gagarin Cup (which he previously won as an assistant coach). He left the club following the end of the 2017-18 season.

Since 2016, Ilya Vorobiev has been a stable member of the coaching staff of the Russian national team headed by Oleg Znarok. On 12 April 2018 he was appointed acting head coach of Russia.

On 9 July 2019, he was dismissed from the posts of head coach in the Russian national team and SKA Saint Petersburg. He was rehired as head coach of Metallurg on 6 September 2019, and served in that capacity until 3 April 2023, when Metallurg fired him.

On 30 April 2024, Vorobiev became the head coach of CSKA Moscow, replacing Sergei Fedorov after management decided not to renew his contract following a first-round exit in the 2024 Gagarin Cup Playoffs.

Sporting positions
Preceded by Oleg Znarok	Russian national ice hockey team coach 2018–2019	Succeeded by Alexei Kudashov
