= Roman Kantserov =

Russian ice hockey player (born 2004)

- Born: 20 September 2004 (age 22) Magnitogorsk, Russia
- Height: 5 ft 9 in (175 cm)
- Weight: 176 lb (80 kg; 12 st 8 lb)
- Position: Right wing
- Shot: Left
- NHL team Former teams: Chicago Blackhawks; Metallurg Magnitogorsk
- NHL draft: 44th overall, 2023; Chicago Blackhawks
- Playing career: 2023–present

Roman Kantserov (Russian: Роман Канцеров; born 20 September 2004) is a Russian professional ice hockey player who is a right winger for the Chicago Blackhawks of the National Hockey League (NHL). He was selected 44th overall by the Blackhawks in the 2023 NHL entry draft.

== Playing career ==
Kantserov started his career in the academy of Metallurg Magnitogorsk, his hometown club. At the age of 16, he debuted in the Junior Hockey League (MHL) for Metallurg's farm club Stalnye Lisy. Through his MHL career, he scored 132 (66+66) points in 147 games. He was invited to the 2022 MHL All-Star Game where his play earned him a spot in the 2022 KHL All-Star Game.

On 29 June 2023, Kantserov was selected 44th overall by the Chicago Blackhawks in the 2023 NHL entry draft.

Although Kantserov made his KHL debut with Metallurg on 20 January 2023 against HC Sibir Novosibirsk, the 2023–24 KHL season was his official rookie season. Through the season, he scored 15 (8+7) points in 53 regular season games and 13 (4+9) in 23 playoff games and became a major contributor to the team's Gagarin Cup championship run. At the end of the season, he was nominated for the Alexei Cherepanov Award given to the KHL's rookie of the year which was ultimately awarded to his teammate, the goaltender Ilya Nabokov.

After winning the Gagarin Cup with Metallurg, Kantserov signed a two-year extension. Next season, he kept up his performance with 38 (13+25) points in 47 regular season games, but Metallurg was eliminated by Avangard Omsk in the first round of the Gagarin Cup playoffs.

In the 2025–26 KHL season Kantserov transitioned from the wing to center. He had an even stronger campaign with 67 points and a league-leading 36 goals in 66 regular season games, and earned his second KHL All-Star Game invite. His third playoff run with Metallurg ended with a defeat to Ak Bars Kazan in the semifinal series.

At the end of his third season with Metallurg, Kantserov signed a three-year, entry-level contract with the Blackhawks on 14 May 2026.

== International play ==
Kantserov won the 2025 Channel One Cup with Russia.

== Personal life ==
On 28 September 2026, Kantserov and his girlfriend Alena made a joint Instagram post announcing that they got married on 8 August 2026.

== Career statistics ==
			Regular season					Playoffs
Season	Team	League	GP	G	A	Pts	PIM	GP	G	A	Pts	PIM
2020–21	Stalnye Lisy	MHL	47	10	11	21	6	5	1	1	2	4
2021–22	Stalnye Lisy	MHL	55	29	28	57	50	9	4	2	6	8
2022–23	Stalnye Lisy	MHL	45	27	27	54	17	3	1	2	3	25
2022–23	Metallurg Magnitogorsk	KHL	1	0	0	0	0	—	—	—	—	—
2023–24	Metallurg Magnitogorsk	KHL	53	8	7	15	10	23	4	9	13	6
2024–25	Metallurg Magnitogorsk	KHL	47	13	25	38	12	6	0	2	2	4
2025–26	Metallurg Magnitogorsk	KHL	63	36	28	64	57	15	4	4	8	4
KHL totals			164	57	60	117	79	44	8	15	23	14
