= Fedor Kanareykin =

Russian ice hockey player (born 1955)

Fedor Leonidovich Kanareykin (Russian: Фёдор Леонидович Канарейкин; 29 May 1955, USSR) is a Soviet ice hockey player, Russian hockey coach. Honored coach of Russia.

In 1973 in the Junior team of the USSR won the gold medal in the European championship in 1974, repeated success in the youth team at the world championship. However, in the adult national team of the USSR never got there.

In 1976 it became the champion of the USSR in the HC Spartak Moscow.

Coaching Kanareykin started in the 90s.

On 25 September 2006 Kanareykin succeeded as head coach of Metallurg Magnitogorsk the Canadian coach Dave King, who Fedor before that worked as an assistant.

Also coached hockey clubs Atlant Moscow Oblast, Spartak Moscow, Avangard Omsk.
