= Valery Postnikov =

Soviet and Russian hockey player and coach

Valery Viktorovich Postnikov (Russian: Валepий Викторович Постников; 19 July 1945 – 3 February 2016) was a Soviet and Russian ice hockey player and coach including Honored Coach of Russia (1992).

As a hockey player he finished his career at 24 years due to injury, and was a graduate of the Chelyabinsk Institute of Physical Education.

As a coach he led the team Metallurg Magnitogorsk (1971–76; 2007–08), farm club Traktor Chelyabinsk (1976–78), Metallist Petropavlovsk (1978-1979), Molot-Prikamye Perm (1997–99; 2002–04) and HC Lada Togliatti (1999-2001).
