= European Hockey League =

1996–2000 European ice hockey club competition

The European Hockey League was a European ice hockey club competition which ran between the years 1996 and 2000.

== History ==
It was established in 1996 by the International Ice Hockey Federation (IIHF) and commercial partner CWL Telesport and first contested in 1996–1997. In 1996–97, twenty teams played in five divisions. After home and away intra-division games, the division winners plus the three best second-placed teams went into the quarter-finals. The first winners were Finnish club TPS, who beat Russian HC Dynamo Moscow 5–2.

In the 1997–98 season, 24 teams competed in six divisions. The division winners and the two best second-placed teams progressed to the quarter-finals. The league title was won by Austrian team VEU Feldkirch, who beat Russian side Dynamo Moscow 5–3.

In the 1998–99 season, 24 teams competed in six divisions. The top two in each division were paired off against each other in two-game, home-and-away series. The winners of these six playoffs went into the semi-final round, which was played in two groups of three. The winner of each of these two groups played in the final. For the third year in a row, Dynamo Moscow lost the final, this time to fellow-Russians Metallurg Magnitogorsk.

In the 1999–2000 season, 16 teams competed in four divisions. The two best clubs in each division advanced to the semi-final round, which was played as two-game, home-and-away series. The four winners of the semi-finals qualified for the EHL Top Four Final. In that final round, Metallurg Magnitogorsk defended its title, this time beating Czech club Sparta Prague 2–0.

Following consultation with its commercial partner, then called CWL Holding AG, the IIHF decided to suspend the running of the European Hockey League for the 2000–01 season. Despite financial investment and the improved quality of the contest, attention from the media, spectators, and TV networks in Europe was not seen as satisfactory. In order to optimize exposure of the league in Europe, the IIHF decided to consult with European broadcasters starting with the 2001–02 season. An international club competition, in the tradition of the previous European Cup, was staged by the IIHF for the 2000–01 season, but the European Hockey League did not restart.

== Finals ==
Season	Winner	Score	Runner-up	Third	Venue
1996–97	(Finland) TPS	5–2	(Russia) Dynamo Moscow	Sweden	Turku, Finland
1997–98	(Austria) VEU Feldkirch	5–3	(Russia) Dynamo Moscow	Czech Republic	Feldkirch, Austria
1998–99	(Russia) Metallurg Magnitogorsk	2–1 (OT)	(Russia) Dynamo Moscow	Germany	Moscow, Russia
1999–2000	(Russia) Metallurg Magnitogorsk	2–0	(Czech Republic) Sparta Prague	Finland	Lugano, Switzerland

== See also ==
- IIHF Continental Cup
- IIHF European Champions Cup
- IIHF European Cup
- Champions Hockey League

== Sources ==
- Müller, Stephan : International Ice Hockey Encyclopedia 1904-2005 / BoD GmbH Norderstedt, 2005 ISBN 3-8334-4189-5
