= 1998–99 European Hockey League =

The 1998–99 European Hockey League was the third edition of the European Hockey League. The season started on September 15, 1998, and finished on February 14, 1999.

The tournament was won by Metallurg Magnitogorsk, who beat HC Dynamo Moscow in an all-Russian final. The game is best remembered for a tying goal allowed by Metallurg goaltender Boris Tortunov with just 8 seconds remaining, on a slapshot from his own end by Dynamo defenceman Andrei Markov. Metallurg overcame the late setback to win in overtime on a goal by Kazakhstani defenceman Vladimir Antipin. This was Dynamo's third straight defeat in a European final, and their fifth overall including their two straight losses in the 1992 and 1993 IIHF European Cups.

The points system used in the first round of the tournament was: the winner in regular time won 3 points; in case of a tie, an overtime is played, the winner in overtime won 2 points and the loser in overtime won 1 point.

== First round ==
=== Group A ===
Team #1	Score	Team #2
Eisbären Berlin (Germany)	4:2	(Czech Republic) HC Dukla Jihlava
Djurgårdens IF (Sweden)	1:3	(Finland) Jokerit
Eisbären Berlin (Germany)	4:3 (OT)	(Sweden) Djurgårdens IF
Jokerit (Finland)	4:3	(Czech Republic) HC Dukla Jihlava
Jokerit (Finland)	1:3	(Germany) Eisbären Berlin
HC Dukla Jihlava (Czech Republic)	5:2	(Sweden) Djurgårdens IF
Eisbären Berlin (Germany)	5:4 (OT)	(Finland) Jokerit
Djurgårdens IF (Sweden)	4:1	(Czech Republic) HC Dukla Jihlava
Djurgårdens IF (Sweden)	3:1	(Germany) Eisbären Berlin
HC Dukla Jihlava (Czech Republic)	2:4	(Finland) Jokerit
Jokerit (Finland)	4:3	(Sweden) Djurgårdens IF
HC Dukla Jihlava (Czech Republic)	2:4	(Germany) Eisbären Berlin

=== Group A standings ===
Rank	Team	Points
1	(Germany) Eisbären Berlin	13
2	(Finland) Jokerit	13
3	(Sweden) Djurgårdens IF	7
4	(Czech Republic) HC Dukla Jihlava	3

=== Group B ===
Team #1	Score	Team #2
Färjestad BK (Sweden)	4:3 (OT)	(Slovakia) HC Slovan Bratislava
HIFK (Finland)	9:3	(Germany) Frankfurt Lions
Färjestad BK (Sweden)	4:3 (OT)	(Germany) Frankfurt Lions
HC Slovan Bratislava (Slovakia)	1:2 (OT)	(Finland) HIFK
Frankfurt Lions (Germany)	4:3 (OT)	(Slovakia) HC Slovan Bratislava
HIFK (Finland)	5:3	(Sweden) Färjestad BK
Färjestad BK (Sweden)	5:1	(Finland) HIFK
HC Slovan Bratislava (Slovakia)	5:2	(Germany) Frankfurt Lions
Frankfurt Lions (Germany)	4:6	(Sweden) Färjestad BK
HIFK (Finland)	3:2	(Slovakia) HC Slovan Bratislava
Frankfurt Lions (Germany)	4:7	(Finland) HIFK
HC Slovan Bratislava (Slovakia)	3:2	(Sweden) Färjestad BK

=== Group B standings ===
Rank	Team	Points
1	(Finland) HIFK	14
2	(Sweden) Färjestad BK	10
3	(Slovakia) HC Slovan Bratislava	9
4	(Germany) Frankfurt Lions	3

=== Group C ===
Team #1	Score	Team #2
EV Zug (Switzerland)	7:3	(Norway) Vålerenga
VEU Feldkirch (Austria)	3:2 (OT)	(Russia) HC Dynamo Moscow
EV Zug (Switzerland)	5:8	(Russia) HC Dynamo Moscow
Vålerenga (Norway)	4:3 (OT)	(Austria) VEU Feldkirch
HC Dynamo Moscow (Russia)	9:4	(Norway) Vålerenga
VEU Feldkirch (Austria)	3:4 (OT)	(Switzerland) EV Zug
EV Zug (Switzerland)	7:4	(Austria) VEU Feldkirch
Vålerenga (Norway)	5:6 (OT)	(Russia) HC Dynamo Moscow
HC Dynamo Moscow (Russia)	3:1	(Switzerland) EV Zug
VEU Feldkirch (Austria)	3:1	(Norway) Vålerenga
HC Dynamo Moscow (Russia)	7:4	(Austria) VEU Feldkirch
Vålerenga (Norway)	5:3	(Switzerland) EV Zug

=== Group C standings ===
Rank	Team	Points
1	(Russia) HC Dynamo Moscow	15
2	(Switzerland) EV Zug	8
3	(Austria) VEU Feldkirch	7
4	(Norway) Vålerenga	6

=== Group D ===
Team #1	Score	Team #2
HC Bolzano (Italy)	1:4	(Sweden) Leksands IF
Manchester Storm (United Kingdom)	4:2	(Finland) Ilves
HC Bolzano (Italy)	1:2	(United Kingdom) Manchester Storm
Ilves (Finland)	2:3	(Sweden) Leksands IF
HC Bolzano (Italy)	2:6	(Finland) Ilves
Leksands IF (Sweden)	2:3 (OT)	(United Kingdom) Manchester Storm
Manchester Storm (United Kingdom)	2:3 (OT)	(Sweden) Leksands IF
Ilves (Finland)	5:2	(Italy) HC Bolzano
Leksands IF (Sweden)	2:4	(Finland) Ilves
Manchester Storm (United Kingdom)	2:5	(Italy) HC Bolzano
Leksands IF (Sweden)	6:3	(Italy) HC Bolzano
Ilves (Finland)	7:3	(United Kingdom) Manchester Storm

=== Group D standings ===
Rank	Team	Points
1	(Finland) Ilves	12
2	(Sweden) Leksands IF	12
3	(United Kingdom) Manchester Storm	9
4	(Italy) HC Bolzano	3

=== Group E ===
Team #1	Score	Team #2
Metallurg Magnitogorsk (Russia)	4:7	(Czech Republic) HC Sparta Praha
HC Fribourg-Gottéron (Switzerland)	2:4	(France) Grenoble Métropole
Grenoble Métropole (France)	2:12	(Russia) Metallurg Magnitogorsk
HC Sparta Praha (Czech Republic)	5:1	(Switzerland) HC Fribourg-Gottéron
HC Fribourg-Gottéron (Switzerland)	3:6	(Russia) Metallurg Magnitogorsk
Grenoble Métropole (France)	0:3	(Czech Republic) HC Sparta Praha
HC Sparta Praha (Czech Republic)	4:3	(France) Grenoble Métropole
Metallurg Magnitogorsk (Russia)	7:0	(Switzerland) HC Fribourg-Gottéron
HC Fribourg-Gottéron (Switzerland)	2:6	(Czech Republic) HC Sparta Praha
Metallurg Magnitogorsk (Russia)	9:3	(France) Grenoble Métropole
Grenoble Métropole (France)	4:3 (OT)	(Switzerland) HC Fribourg-Gottéron
HC Sparta Praha (Czech Republic)	2:3	(Russia) Metallurg Magnitogorsk

=== Group E standings ===
Rank	Team	Points
1	(Czech Republic) HC Sparta Praha	15
2	(Russia) Metallurg Magnitogorsk	15
3	(France) Grenoble Métropole	5
4	(Switzerland) HC Fribourg-Gottéron	1

=== Group F ===
Team #1	Score	Team #2
Ayr Scottish Eagles (United Kingdom)	3:6	(Germany) Adler Mannheim
HC Chemopetrol Litvínov (Czech Republic)	1:4	(Russia) Ak Bars Kazan
Ak Bars Kazan (Russia)	5:4 (OT)	(Germany) Adler Mannheim
Ayr Scottish Eagles (United Kingdom)	4:3	(Czech Republic) HC Chemopetrol Litvínov
Ak Bars Kazan (Russia)	2:4	(United Kingdom) Ayr Scottish Eagles
Adler Mannheim (Germany)	6:0	(Czech Republic) HC Chemopetrol Litvínov
Ayr Scottish Eagles (United Kingdom)	3:1	(Russia) Ak Bars Kazan
HC Chemopetrol Litvínov (Czech Republic)	5:4 (OT)	(Germany) Adler Mannheim
Adler Mannheim (Germany)	2:7	(Russia) Ak Bars Kazan
HC Chemopetrol Litvínov (Czech Republic)	5:4 (OT)	(United Kingdom) Ayr Scottish Eagles
Ak Bars Kazan (Russia)	3:2	(Czech Republic) HC Chemopetrol Litvínov
Adler Mannheim (Germany)	6:5	(United Kingdom) Ayr Scottish Eagles

=== Group F standings ===
Rank	Team	Points
1	(Russia) Ak Bars Kazan	11
2	(Germany) Adler Mannheim	11
3	(United Kingdom) Ayr Scottish Eagles	10
4	(Czech Republic) HC Chemopetrol Litvínov	4

== Second round ==
Team #1	Score	Team #2
Metallurg Magnitogorsk (Russia)	4:2	(Russia) Ak Bars Kazan
Jokerit (Finland)	2:3	(Finland) HIFK
Färjestad BK (Sweden)	3:5	(Germany) Eisbären Berlin
Adler Mannheim (Germany)	6:4	(Czech Republic) HC Sparta Praha
Leksands IF (Sweden)	2:1	(Russia) HC Dynamo Moscow
EV Zug (Switzerland)	3:5	(Finland) Ilves
Ak Bars Kazan (Russia)	3:2 (0:1 PS)	(Russia) Metallurg Magnitogorsk
HIFK (Finland)	7:5	(Finland) Jokerit
Eisbären Berlin (Germany)	3:1	(Sweden) Färjestad BK
HC Sparta Praha (Czech Republic)	10:4 (0:1 PS)	(Germany) Adler Mannheim
HC Dynamo Moscow (Russia)	3:1 (OT)	(Sweden) Leksands IF
Ilves (Finland)	6:3	(Switzerland) EV Zug

== Third round ==
=== Group A ===
(Berlin, Germany)

Team #1	Score	Team #2
Eisbären Berlin (Germany)	5:3	(Germany) Adler Mannheim
Adler Mannheim (Germany)	1:6	(Russia) HC Dynamo Moscow
Eisbären Berlin (Germany)	2:2	(Russia) HC Dynamo Moscow

=== Group A standings ===
Rank	Team	Points
1	(Russia) HC Dynamo Moscow	3
2	(Germany) Eisbären Berlin	3
3	(Germany) Adler Mannheim	0

=== Group B ===
(Helsinki, Finland)

Team #1	Score	Team #2
HIFK (Finland)	4:5	(Finland) Ilves
Ilves (Finland)	2:2	(Russia) Metallurg Magnitogorsk
HIFK (Finland)	1:3	(Russia) Metallurg Magnitogorsk

=== Group B standings ===
Rank	Team	Points
1	(Russia) Metallurg Magnitogorsk	3
2	(Finland) Ilves	3
3	(Finland) HIFK	0

== Final stage ==
(Moscow, Russia)

=== Semifinals ===
Team #1	Score	Team #2
HC Dynamo Moscow (Russia)	3:1	(Finland) Ilves
Metallurg Magnitogorsk (Russia)	5:1	(Germany) Eisbären Berlin

=== Third place match ===
Team #1	Score	Team #2
Eisbären Berlin (Germany); Felski ( (Canada) Corriveau, (Sweden) Wahlberg, 15:22), (Canada) / (Greece) Govedaris ( (Canada) McKim, 39:46), (Canada) Fortier ( (Canada) Chitarroni, 46:25), (Sweden) Svensson ( (Sweden) Rhodin, (Canada) Corriveau. 56:05)	4:1	(Finland) Ilves; Arvaja (Haapakoski, 13:43)

=== Final ===
Team #1	Score	Team #2
HC Dynamo Moscow (Russia); Markov (Afinogenov, 59:52)	1:2	(Russia) Metallurg Magnitogorsk; A. Koreshkov (Gusmanov, Ye. Koreshkov, 43:58), Antipin (Razin, 62:09)
