= 1999–2000 European Hockey League =

The 1999–2000 European Hockey League was the fourth and last edition of the European Hockey League. The season started on September 21, 1999, and finished on February 6, 2000.

The tournament was won by Metallurg Magnitogorsk, who beat HC Sparta Praha in the final.

The points system used in the first round of the tournament was: the winner in regular time won 3 points; in case of a tie, an overtime is played, the winner in overtime won 2 points and the loser in overtime won 1 point.

Location of teams for the 1999–2000 European Hockey League

== First round ==
=== Group A ===
Team #1	Score	Team #2
Metallurg Magnitogorsk (Russia)	5:2	(Czech Republic) HC Slovnaft Vsetín
HC Slovan Bratislava (Slovakia)	3:2	(Austria) EC Villacher
HC Slovnaft Vsetín (Czech Republic)	2:3	(Slovakia) HC Slovan Bratislava
EC Villacher (Austria)	3:6	(Russia) Metallurg Magnitogorsk
Metallurg Magnitogorsk (Russia)	1:2	(Slovakia) HC Slovan Bratislava
HC Slovnaft Vsetín (Czech Republic)	3:4 (OT)	(Austria) EC Villacher
HC Slovan Bratislava (Slovakia)	3:4 (OT)	(Russia) Metallurg Magnitogorsk
EC Villacher (Austria)	6:2	(Czech Republic) HC Slovnaft Vsetín
Metallurg Magnitogorsk (Russia)	5:6 (OT)	(Austria) EC Villacher
HC Slovan Bratislava (Slovakia)	6:1	(Czech Republic) HC Slovnaft Vsetín
HC Slovnaft Vsetín (Czech Republic)	3:4	(Russia) Metallurg Magnitogorsk
EC Villacher (Austria)	3:1	(Slovakia) HC Slovan Bratislava

=== Group A standings ===
Rank	Team	Points
1	(Slovakia) HC Slovan Bratislava	13
2	(Russia) Metallurg Magnitogorsk	12
3	(Austria) EC Villacher	10
4	(Czech Republic) HC Slovnaft Vsetín	1

=== Group B ===
Team #1	Score	Team #2
Brynäs IF (Sweden)	5:4 (OT)	(Czech Republic) HC Sparta Praha
Manchester Storm (United Kingdom)	3:5	(Finland) HIFK
HIFK (Finland)	5:0	(Sweden) Brynäs IF
HC Sparta Praha (Czech Republic)	2:1 (OT)	(United Kingdom) Manchester Storm
Brynäs IF (Sweden)	4:1	(United Kingdom) Manchester Storm
HIFK (Finland)	6:3	(Czech Republic) HC Sparta Praha
Manchester Storm (United Kingdom)	1:4	(Czech Republic) HC Sparta Praha
Brynäs IF (Sweden)	4:6	(Finland) HIFK
HC Sparta Praha (Czech Republic)	12:1	(Finland) HIFK
Manchester Storm (United Kingdom)	4:5 (OT)	(Sweden) Brynäs IF
HC Sparta Praha (Czech Republic)	4:1	(Sweden) Brynäs IF
HIFK (Finland)	6:3	(United Kingdom) Manchester Storm

=== Group B standings ===
Rank	Team	Points
1	(Finland) HIFK	15
2	(Czech Republic) HC Sparta Praha	12
3	(Sweden) Brynäs IF	7
4	(United Kingdom) Manchester Storm	2

=== Group C ===
Team #1	Score	Team #2
TPS (Finland)	1:4	(Sweden) Modo
Adler Mannheim (Germany)	4:5 (OT)	(Norway) Vålerenga
Modo (Sweden)	4:0	(Germany) Adler Mannheim
Vålerenga (Norway)	2:3 (OT)	(Finland) TPS
TPS (Finland)	5:4	(Germany) Adler Mannheim
Modo (Sweden)	8:0	(Norway) Vålerenga
Vålerenga (Norway)	2:3	(Sweden) Modo
Adler Mannheim (Germany)	2:6	(Finland) TPS
TPS (Finland)	5:0	(Norway) Vålerenga
Adler Mannheim (Germany)	1:6	(Sweden) Modo
Modo (Sweden)	1:2	(Finland) TPS
Vålerenga (Norway)	5:0	(Germany) Adler Mannheim

=== Group C standings ===
Rank	Team	Points
1	(Sweden) Modo	16
2	(Finland) TPS	14
3	(Norway) Vålerenga	6
4	(Germany) Adler Mannheim	1

=== Group D ===
Team #1	Score	Team #2
Nürnberg Ice Tigers (Germany)	2:1	(Russia) HC Dynamo Moscow
HC Lugano (Switzerland)	4:3	(France) HC Amiens Somme
HC Dynamo Moscow (Russia)	7:2	(Switzerland) HC Lugano
HC Amiens Somme (France)	0:4	(Germany) Nürnberg Ice Tigers
HC Dynamo Moscow (Russia)	3:0	(France) HC Amiens Somme
Nürnberg Ice Tigers (Germany)	4:3	(Switzerland) HC Lugano
HC Amiens Somme (France)	0:5	(Russia) HC Dynamo Moscow
HC Lugano (Switzerland)	4:3 (OT)	(Germany) Nürnberg Ice Tigers
HC Lugano (Switzerland)	3:1	(Russia) HC Dynamo Moscow
Nürnberg Ice Tigers (Germany)	8:2	(France) HC Amiens Somme
HC Amiens Somme (France)	0:6	(Switzerland) HC Lugano
HC Dynamo Moscow (Russia)	1:2 (OT)	(Germany) Nürnberg Ice Tigers

=== Group D standings ===
Rank	Team	Points
1	(Germany) Nürnberg Ice Tigers	15
2	(Switzerland) HC Lugano	11
3	(Russia) HC Dynamo Moscow	10
4	(France) HC Amiens Somme	0

== Quarterfinals ==
Team #1	Score	Team #2
TPS (Finland)	5:3	(Finland) HIFK
Metallurg Magnitogorsk (Russia)	4:0	(Sweden) Modo
HC Lugano (Switzerland)	5:2	(Slovakia) HC Slovan Bratislava
HC Sparta Praha (Czech Republic)	4:0	(Germany) Nürnberg Ice Tigers
HIFK (Finland)	3:2 (0:1 PS)	(Finland) TPS
Modo (Sweden)	6:4 (0:1 PS)	(Russia) Metallurg Magnitogorsk
HC Slovan Bratislava (Slovakia)	5:6	(Switzerland) HC Lugano
Nürnberg Ice Tigers (Germany)	2:3	(Czech Republic) HC Sparta Praha

== Final stage ==
(Lugano, Ticino, Switzerland)

=== Semifinals ===
Team #1	Score	Team #2
Metallurg Magnitogorsk (Russia)	5:3	(Finland) TPS
HC Lugano (Switzerland)	2:3	(Czech Republic) HC Sparta Praha

=== Third place match ===
Team #1	Score	Team #2
HC Lugano (Switzerland)	1:6	(Finland) TPS

=== Final ===
Team #1	Score	Team #2
Metallurg Magnitogorsk (Russia)	2:0	(Czech Republic) HC Sparta Praha
