= Metallurg Magnitogorsk =

Ice hockey team based in Magnitogorsk, Chelyabinsk Oblast, Russia

- City: Magnitogorsk, Russia
- League: Kontinental Hockey League
- Conference: Eastern
- Division: Kharlamov
- Founded: 1955
- Home arena: Arena Metallurg (capacity: 7,704)
- Colours
- Owner: Viktor Rashnikov
- General manager: Alexei Zhloba
- Head coach: Konstantin Shafranov
- Captain: Egor Yakovlev
- Affiliates: Magnitka Magnitogorsk (VHL); Stalnye Lisy (MHL)
- Website: metallurg.ru
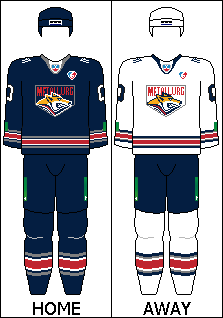

Metallurg Magnitogorsk (Russian: Металлург Магнитогорск) is a professional ice hockey club based in Magnitogorsk, Russia. It is a member of the Kharlamov Division in the Kontinental Hockey League (KHL).

Metallurg Magnitogorsk won the Gagarin Cup in the 2013–14 KHL season, 2015–16 KHL season, and the 2023–24 KHL season.

== History ==
Metallurg was founded in 1955 by the Magnitogorsk Iron and Steel Works (MMK) as a Class B team that competed in the Chelyabinsk Oblast and the RSFSR championships. Since 1980, they were led by the head coach Valery Postnikov. Under his leadership, the club won the Second League Class B, a fourth-tier league, and was promoted to the third-tier Second League Class A, then won its championships twice, in 1988–89 and 1989–90 seasons. After two more seasons in the second level of Soviet hockey, Metallurg became one of the founders of the International Hockey League (MHL), the first post-Soviet major professional hockey league. Thanks to MMK's funding, Metallurg acquired several key players from other clubs, including Sergei Mogilnikov from Torpedo Ust-Kamenogorsk, Andrei Martemyanov from Avtomobilist Yekaterinburg and Igor Ulshin from HC Sibir Novosibirsk. In their first season in the top flight, Metallurg managed to reach sixth place in the Eastern Conference, then upset HC Spartak Moscow, one of the historic powerhouses of Soviet hockey, in the first round of the playoffs before falling to Traktor Chelyabinsk in the second round. In the 1995 MHL playoffs, Metallurg reached the semifinals, and in 1996 they earned a spot in the final series, which they lost to HC Dynamo Moscow 1–3. Valery Postnikov coached the team until 1996, then his assistant Valery Belousov took over.

Variant of team logo used 1999-2013

Metallurg carried over their status as one of the strongest teams into the Russian Superleague, and in the 1997–98 Russian Superleague season they won the cup for the first time, winning the final series 3–1 over Dynamo Moscow. This victory earned them a spot in the 1998–99 European Hockey League which they won. In the next season, Metallurg won both the regular season and the playoffs, earning the title of Champions of Russia. They also won their second European title in the 1999-2000 European Hockey League.

In total, Metallurg advanced to the Russian Superleague finals six times and became a three-time champion of Russia. The club also won the 2008 edition of the IIHF European Champions Cup and reached the finals the Champions Hockey League in 2009, losing the final series to the Swiss ZSC Lions.

Evgeny Malkin started his career with Metallurg Magnitogorsk, signing his first professional contract before the 2003–04 Russian Superleague season. He played three seasons for Metallurg before leaving for the Pittsburgh Penguins with one year of the contract left after a dispute with the club's ownership. He would return to play for Metallurg during the 2012-13 NHL lockout.

=== Victoria Cup ===
On 1 October 2008, Metallurg Magnitogorsk played against NHL's New York Rangers in the inaugural Victoria Cup at the PostFinance-Arena in Bern with an attendance of 13,794. Metallurg Magnitogorsk led most of the game, 3–0 at one point, but ultimately lost 4–3 by the Rangers' Ryan Callahan breakaway goal with 20 seconds remaining in the game. Denis Platonov, Vladimir Malenkikh and Nikolai Zavarukhin scored for Metallurg, and Dan Fritsche scored and Chris Drury scored twice for the Rangers. As a sign of respect, Russian Dmitri Kalinin and Ukrainian Nikolay Zherdev accepted the Victoria Cup trophy on behalf of the New York Rangers.

=== KHL ===
Metallurg Magnitogorsk was a founding member of the Kontinental Hockey League and qualified to the Gagarin Cup playoffs in all of its seasons. They won the Gagarin Cup in the 2013–14 KHL season, 2015–16 KHL season, and the 2023–24 KHL season.

In the inaugural season of the new league Metallurg played in the Tarasov Division and placed second after HC CSKA Moscow. In the playoffs, they won bronze medals after beating Torpedo Nizhny Novgorod 3-0 and Atlant Mytichtchi 3-1 and losing to Lokomotiv Yaroslavl 1–4.

In the second season, the KHL divided into conferences for the first time, and Metallurg was placed into the Kharlamov Division of the Eastern Conference. They finished the regular season on top of the division and defeated Traktor Chelyabinsk 3–1 in the first round of the playoffs, but were eliminated in the second round by the reigning champion Ak Bars Kazan in six games.

Sergey Mozyakin had been Metallurg's star player in the KHL. He played in Magnitogorsk between 2011 and 2021. His number 10 has been retired by the club. He holds the all-time goalscoring record in the KHL with 351 goals and held the points record with 928 points until it was beaten by Vadim Shipachyov in 2024. In the 2016-17 KHL season he set records for most points (85, beaten by Nikita Gusev in 2023-24) and most goals (48, beaten by Joshua Leivo in 2024-25) in a KHL regular season.

The 2021–22 KHL season had a nonstandard format because of the COVID-19 pandemic and the 2022 Winter Olympics, as the regular season was ended early and the Kontinental Cup was not awarded. Also, before the playoffs started, starting goaltender Juho Olkinuora elected to leave the team due to the 2022 Russo-Ukrainian War. Despite that, the team, with the veteran Vasily Koshechkin in net, built back on its momentum from the regular season, where they had the best points percentage and most goals scored of all KHL teams, and defeated Barys Astana, Avangard Omsk and Traktor Chelyabinsk on the way to the Gagarin Cup Final against HC CSKA Moscow. Metallurg then took a 3-1 lead in the series but allowed CSKA to come back, win three games in a row and the Gagarin Cup.

In the 2022–23 KHL season struggled during the regular season, finishing fifth in the conference, overcame a 3-2 deficit to win the first round matchup against Avtomobilist Yekaterinburg in Game 7 overtime, and were then swept by Avangard Omsk. The club management considered the result disappointing, so Ilya Vorobiev, the head coach who led the team to two Gagarin Cups, left the team. It was also the final season for Vasily Koshechkin, who lost the starting job to Edward Pasquale that season. At the time of his retirement Koshechkin held KHL records in games played (765), wins (378) and shutouts (90).

Before the 2023–24 KHL season, Metallurg hired Andrei Razin, who previously became Champion of Russia with the club as a player then coached Severstal Cherepovets, as the head coach. In his first season, he led the team to finish the regular season first in the Eastern Conference, then to advance past Amur Khabarovsk and HC Spartak Moscow with 4-2 victories in the first two rounds of the playoffs, defeat Avtomobilist Yekaterinburg in a seven-game semifinal series and finally sweep Lokomotiv Yaroslavl to lift the Gagarin Cup. In the Gagarin Cup Finals, Metallurg's 21-year-old goaltender Ilya Nabokov only allowed three goals in four games. Among other key contributors were Robin Press, Alexander Petunin and Daniil Vovchenko, who all followed Razin from Severstal. Nabokov was awarded playoff MVP and rookie of the year honors for the season, while Razin was recognized as its best coach.

In the following 2024–25 KHL season, Metallurg struggled with injuries, but managed to get to third place in the East and fourth place in the overall standings of the regular season. In the first round of the playoffs, they were matched against Avangard Omsk, which rebuilt their roster in the middle of the season and reached strong form by spring. Avangard won the series 4-2 and eliminated the reigning champions.

In the regular season of 2025–26 Metallurg recorded several historic achievements: they placed first in the overall standings and won the club's first Kontinental Cup, and set the KHL scoring record with 251 goals across the regular season. 21-year-old Roman Kantserov scored 36 goals and became the best goalscorer of the season and the youngest player to achieve this in KHL history. In the playoffs, they defeated HC Sibir Novosibirsk and Torpedo Nizhny Novgorod 4-1, then were eliminated by Ak Bars Kazan 1-4.

== Season-by-season record ==
For the full season-by-season history, see List of Metallurg Magnitogorsk seasons.

Note: GP = Games played, W = Wins, L = Losses, OTW = Overtime/shootout wins, OTL = Overtime/shootout losses, Pts = Points, GF = Goals for, GA = Goals against

Season	GP	W	L	OTW	OTL	Pts	GF	GA	Finish	Playoffs
1997–98	46	31	5	-	-	72	173	82	2nd, all league	Russian Cup Champions, 3–1 (HC Dynamo Moscow)
1998–99	42	34	2	-	-	74	180	80	1st, all league	Champions of Russia, 4–2 (HC Dynamo Moscow)
1999–2000	38	24	9	1	1	78	132	96	3rd, all league	Lost in Semifinals, 2–3 (Ak Bars Kazan)
2000–01	54	24	9	6	2	87	153	96	1st, Group A	Champions of Russia, 4–2 (Avangard Omsk)
2001–02	51	28	15	3	3	95	152	125	5th, all league	Lost in Semifinals, 0–3 (Lokomotiv Yaroslavl)
2002–03	51	23	14	2	4	85	121	101	6th, all league	Lost in Quarterfinals, 0–3 (Severstal Cherepovets)
2003–04	60	35	18	2	1	114	176	129	1st, all league	Lost in Finals, 2–3 (Avangard Omsk)
2004–05	60	34	15	2	4	115	193	124	3rd, all league	Lost in Quarterfinals, 2–3 (Avangard Omsk)
2005–06	51	38	4	4	4	127	175	75	1st, all league	Lost in Semifinals, 1–3 (Avangard Omsk)
2006–07	54	30	14	2	1	102	146	99	4th, all league	Champions of Russia, 3–2 (Ak Bars Kazan)
2007–08	57	31	12	4	3	115	175	113	2nd, all league	Lost in Semifinals, 0–3 (Lokomotiv Yaroslavl)
2008–09	56	25	15	13	3	104	174	148	2nd, Tarasov	Lost in Semifinals, 1–4 (Lokomotiv Yaroslavl)
2009–10	56	34	15	6	1	115	167	111	1st, Kharlamov	Lost in Conference Semifinals, 2–4 (Ak Bars Kazan)
2010–11	54	27	14	6	7	100	167	141	2nd, Kharlamov	Lost in Conference Finals, 3–4 (Salavat Yulaev Ufa)
2011–12	54	29	20	3	4	94	150	137	2nd, Kharlamov	Lost in Conference Semifinals, 1–4 (Avangard Omsk)
2012–13	52	27	13	0	12	93	167	121	3rd, Kharlamov	Lost in Conference Quarterfinals, 3–4 (Salavat Yulaev Ufa)
2013–14	54	35	11	0	2	108	166	113	1st, Kharlamov	Gagarin Cup Champions, 4–3 (Lev Praha)
2014–15	60	32	15	8	5	117	174	129	2nd, Kharlamov	Lost in Conference Semifinals, 1–4 (Sibir Novosibirsk)
2015–16	60	25	20	13	2	103	180	138	1st, Kharlamov	Gagarin Cup Champions, 4–3 (CSKA Moscow)
2016–17	60	36	13	5	6	124	197	135	1st, Kharlamov	Lost in Gagarin Cup Finals, 1–4 (SKA Saint Petersburg)
2017–18	56	24	17	8	7	95	150	135	4th, Kharlamov	Lost in Conference Semifinals, 1–4 (Ak Bars Kazan)
2018–19	62	35	19	6	2	84	182	132	2nd, Kharlamov	Lost in Conference Quarterfinals, 2–4 (Salavat Yulaev Ufa)
2019–20	62	20	25	8	9	65	138	145	4th, Kharlamov	Lost in Conference Quarterfinals, 1–4 (Barys Nur-Sultan)
2020–21	60	31	16	6	7	81	165	138	2nd, Kharlamov	Lost in Conference Semifinals, 2–4 (Avangard Omsk)
2021–22	48	26	11	8	3	71	164	120	1st, Kharlamov	Lost in Gagarin Cup Finals, 3–4 (CSKA Moscow)
2022–23	68	30	20	5	13	83	189	175	3rd, Kharlamov	Lost in Conference Semifinals, 0–4 (Avangard Omsk)
2023–24	68	35	17	9	7	95	212	167	1st, Kharlamov	Gagarin Cup Champions, 4–0 (Lokomotiv Yaroslavl)
2024–25	68	30	21	13	4	90	197	154	2nd, Kharlamov	Lost in Conference Quarterfinals, 2–4 (Avangard Omsk)
2025–26	68	37	12	7	12	105	252	184	1st, Kharlamov	Lost in Semifinals, 1–4 (Ak Bars Kazan)

== Players ==
=== Current roster ===
Updated 12 September 2026.

No.	Nat	Player	Pos	S/G	Age	Acquired	Birthplace
84	(Russia)	Mikhail Fyodorov	RW	L	19	2024	Magnitogorsk, Russia
98	(Russia)	Yegor Ganabin	D	L	25	2026	Yekaterinburg, Russia
22	(Russia)	Ruslan Iskhakov	C	L	26	2025	Moscow, Russia
47	(United States)	Luke Johnson (A)	C	R	32	2023	Grand Forks, North Dakota, United States
13	(Russia)	Kirill Kadyshev	RW	L	24	2026	Chelyabinsk, Russia
56	(Russia)	Makar Khabarov	D	L	27	2023	Cherepovets, Russia
94	(Russia)	Yegor Korobkin	F	L	28	2017	Magnitogorsk, Russia
96	(Russia)	Nikita Korotkov	F	L	30	2025	Novosibirsk, Russia
39	(Russia)	Andrei Kozlov	C	L	21	2023	Magnitogorsk, Russia
11	(Kazakhstan)	Nikita Mikhailis	LW	R	31	2023	Karaganda, Kazakhstan
72	(Russia)	Artyom Minulin	D	R	28	2019	Tyumen, Russia
93	(Russia)	Igor Nechayev	C	L	20	2025	Orsk, Russia
9	(Kazakhstan)	Valeri Orekhov	D	R	27	2022	Satpaev, Kazakhstan
87	(Belarus)	Danila Palivko	D	L	24	2023	Novopolotsk, Belarus
55	(Russia)	Vladislav Provolnev	D	L	31	2026	Voronezh, Russia
14	(Russia)	Dmitri Silantyev	F	L	26	2023	Moscow, Russia
74	(Russia)	Alexander Siryatsky	D	L	20	2023	Omsk, Russia
20	(Russia)	Alexander Smolin	G	L	23	2023	Chebarkul, Russia
18	(Russia)	Stepan Starkov	RW	L	27	2026	Shebekino, Russia
19	(Russia)	Vladimir Tkachev (A)	LW	R	31	2025	Omsk, Russia
27	(Canada)	Nathan Todd	C	R	30	2026	Kemptville, Ontario, Canada
28	(Russia)	Sergey Tolchinsky	RW	L	31	2025	Moscow, Russia
29	(Russia)	Daniil Vovchenko	RW	R	30	2023	Cherepovets, Russia
44	(Russia)	Egor Yakovlev (C)	D	L	35	2019	Magnitogorsk, Russian SFSR
30	(Russia)	Yegor Zavragin	G	L	21	2026	Novosibirsk, Russia
47	(Russia)	Yegor Zelenov	D	L	24	2026	Penza, Russia

=== Team captains ===
- Sergei Mogilnikov 1991–94
- Sergei Starkovski 1994–95
- Mikhail Borodulin 1995–96
- Evgeny Koreshkov 1996–97
- Mikhail Borodulin 1997–99
- Sergei Gomolyako 1999–2000
- Evgeny Koreshkov 2000–03
- Valeri Karpov 2003–05
- Evgeny Varlamov 2005–06
- Ravil Gusmanov 2006–08
- Vitaly Atyushov 2008–11
- Sergei Fedorov 2011–12
- Denis Platonov 2012
- Evgeni Malkin 2012–13
- Sergei Mozyakin 2013–21
- Egor Yakovlev 2021–25
- Alexei Maklyukov 2025–26
- Egor Yakovlev 2026−

=== Head coaches ===
- Felix Mirsky 1955–57
- Georgy Mordukhovich 1957–58
- Georgy Mordukhovich 1969–71
- Valery Postnikov 1971–76
- Khalim Mingaleev 1976–79
- Valery Postnikov 1979–96
- Valery Belousov 1996–2003
- Marek Sykora 2003–05
- Dave King 2005–06
- Fedor Kanareykin 2006–07
- Valery Postnikov 2007–08
- Valery Belousov 2008–10
- Kari Heikkilä 2010–11
- Aleksander Barkov 2011
- Fedor Kanareykin 2011–12
- Paul Maurice 2012–13
- Mike Keenan 2013–15
- Ilya Vorobiev 2015–17
- Viktor Kozlov 2017–18
- Josef Jandač 2018–19
- Ilya Vorobiev 2019–23
- Andrei Razin 2023–26
- Vladimir Vorobiev 2026
- Konstantin Shafranov 2026−

=== Retired numbers ===
Metallurg Magnitogorsk retired numbers
No.	Player	Position	Career	Date of retirement
10	(Russia) Sergei Mozyakin	LW	2011–2021	27 July 2024
15	(Czech Republic) Jan Marek	C	1997–2011	28 August 2012
34	(Russia) Ravil Gusmanov	LW	1989–2010	19 November 2012

== Franchise leaders ==
=== All-time KHL scoring leaders ===
These are the top-ten point-scorers in franchise history. Figures are updated after each completed KHL regular season.

Note: Pos = Position; GP = Games played; G = Goals; A = Assists; Pts = Points; P/G = Points per game; = current Metallurg player;

Points
Player	Pos	GP	G	A	Pts	P/G
(Russia) Sergei Mozyakin	LW	519	263	290	553	1.06
(Czech Republic) Jan Kovář	C	285	97	189	286	1.01
(Russia) Danis Zaripov	LW	229	87	140	227	.99
(Canada) Chris Lee	D	253	45	144	189	.75
(Russia) Denis Platonov	RW	493	85	84	169	.34
(Russia) Egor Yakovlev	D	412	42	116	158	.38
(Russia) Viktor Antipin	D	381	52	92	144	.38
(Russia) Andrei Chibisov	LW	245	65	69	134	.55
(Czech Republic) Tomáš Rolinek	LW	215	68	57	125	.58
(Sweden) Robin Press	D	189	19	103	122	.64

Goals
Player	Pos	G
(Russia) Sergei Mozyakin	LW	263
(Czech Republic) Jan Kovář	C	97
(Russia) Danis Zaripov	LW	87
(Russia) Denis Platonov	RW	85
(Czech Republic) Tomáš Rolinek	LW	68
(Russia) Andrei Chibisov	LW	65
(Russia) Roman Kantserov	RW	57
(Finland) Oskar Osala	LW	56
(Russia) Denis Zernov	C	54
(Russia) Viktor Antipin	D	52

Assists
Player	Pos	A
(Russia) Sergei Mozyakin	LW	290
(Czech Republic) Jan Kovář	C	189
(Canada) Chris Lee	D	144
(Russia) Danis Zaripov	LW	140
(Russia) Egor Yakovlev	D	116
(Sweden) Robin Press	D	103
(Russia) Viktor Antipin	D	92
(Russia) Alexei Kaigorodov	C	90
(Russia) Yevgeny Biryukov	D	84
(Russia) Denis Platonov	RW	84

== Awards and trophies ==
Gagarin Cup

- (gold) Winners (3): 2014, 2016, 2024
- (silver) Runners-up (1): 2017

Kontinental Cup

- (gold) Winners (1): 2025-26

Opening Cup

- (gold) Winners (2): 2014–15, 2016–17

Russian Superleague

- (gold) Winners (4): 1997–98, 1998–99, 2000–01, 2006–07
- (silver) Runners-up (1): 2003–04
- (bronze) 3rd place (3): 1999–2000, 2001–02, 2005–06

Silver Stone Trophy

- (gold) Winners (3): 1999, 2000, 2008

IIHF Super Cup

- (gold) Winners (1): 2000
- (silver) Runners-up (1): 1999

Champions Hockey League

- (silver) Runners-up (1): 2008–09

Spengler Cup

- (gold) Winners (1): 2005

Victoria Cup

- (silver) Runners-up (1): 2008

Tampere Cup

- (gold) Winners (3): 2005, 2006, 2008

Hockeyades (Vallé de Joux)

- (gold) Winners (1): 2009

Davos Hockey Summit

- (silver) Runners-up (1): 2018
