= 2005–06 Russian Superleague season =

- League: Russian Superleague
- Sport: Ice hockey
- Duration: September 7, 2005 – April 16, 2006
- Number of teams: 18

Regular season
- Season champions: Metallurg Magnitogorsk

Playoffs

Final
- Champions: Ak Bars Kazan
- Runners-up: HC Avangard Omsk

Russian Superleague seasons
- ← 2004–05 2006–07 →

The 2005–06 Russian Superleague season was the tenth season of the Russian Superleague, the top level of ice hockey in Russia. 18 teams participated in the league, and Ak Bars Kazan won the championship. This year, the league decided to expand the playoff field from 8 teams to 16, and did away with the third place series.

== Standings ==
	Club	GP	W	OTW	T	OTL	L	GF	GA	Pts
1.	Metallurg Magnitogorsk	51	38	4	4	1	4	175	75	127
2.	Ak Bars Kazan	51	25	5	9	4	8	150	109	98
3.	Lokomotiv Yaroslavl	51	28	0	10	2	11	168	104	96
4.	HC Avangard Omsk	51	26	3	6	3	13	129	112	93
5.	HC CSKA Moscow	51	25	0	8	1	17	153	128	84
6.	Khimik Moscow Oblast	51	22	5	8	0	16	123	117	84
7.	Salavat Yulaev Ufa	51	21	0	11	2	17	128	110	76
8.	HC Dynamo Moscow	51	20	3	4	5	18	131	122	76
9.	HC Lada Togliatti	51	20	4	7	0	20	90	95	75
10.	HC Spartak Moscow	51	20	2	6	3	20	112	111	73
11.	Neftekhimik Nizhnekamsk	51	18	1	10	2	20	117	116	68
12.	Severstal Cherepovets	51	16	2	10	4	19	103	114	66
13.	SKA St. Petersburg	51	19	2	3	1	26	109	134	65
14.	HC Sibir Novosibirsk	51	15	1	8	1	26	99	131	56
15.	HC MVD Tver	51	11	4	8	3	25	89	132	52
16.	Metallurg Novokuznetsk	51	12	1	7	1	30	118	153	46
17.	Vityaz Chekhov	51	11	1	6	1	32	89	149	42
18.	Molot-Prikamye Perm	51	8	1	5	4	33	81	155	35

== Playoffs ==
First round
1	Metallurg Magnitogorsk	3
16	Metallurg Novokuznetsk	0
8	HC Dynamo Moscow	1
9	HC Lada Togliatti	3
4	HC Avangard Omsk	3
13	SKA St. Petersburg	0
5	HC CSKA Moscow	3
12	Severstal Cherepovets	1
3	Lokomotiv Yaroslavl	3
14	HC Sibir Novosibirsk	1
6	Khimik Moscow Oblast	3
11	Neftekhimik Nizhnekamsk	2
2	Ak Bars Kazan	3
15	HC MVD Tver	1
7	Salavat Yulaev Ufa	3
10	HC Spartak Moscow	0

Quarterfinals
1	Metallurg Magnitogorsk	3
8	HC Lada Togliatti	1
4	HC Avangard Omsk	3
5	HC CSKA Moscow	0
3	Lokomotiv Yaroslavl	3
6	Khimik Moscow Oblast	1
2	Ak Bars Kazan	3
7	Salavat Yulaev Ufa	0

Semifinals
1	Metallurg Magnitogorsk	1
4	HC Avangard Omsk	3
3	Lokomotiv Yaroslavl	0
2	Ak Bars Kazan	3

Final
4	HC Avangard Omsk	0
2	Ak Bars Kazan	3
