= 2000–01 Russian Superleague season =

- League: Russian Superleague
- Sport: Ice hockey
- Duration: September 7, 2000 – April 6, 2001
- Number of teams: 18

First Round
- Season champions: Ak Bars Kazan

Second Round
- Season champions: HC Dynamo Moscow

Playoffs

Final
- Champions: Metallurg Magnitogorsk
- Runners-up: Avangard Omsk

Russian Superleague seasons
- ← 1999–00 2001–02 →

The 2000–01 Russian Superleague season was the fifth season of the Russian Superleague, the top level of ice hockey in Russia. 18 teams participated in the league, and Metallurg Magnitogorsk won the championship.

== First round ==
	Club	GP	W	OTW	T	OTL	L	GF	GA	Pts
1.	Ak Bars Kazan	34	21	1	5	0	7	115	65	70
2.	Avangard Omsk	34	18	2	8	1	5	101	56	67
3.	Metallurg Magnitogorsk	34	17	5	4	2	6	121	78	67
4.	HC Lada Togliatti	34	19	0	7	2	6	92	65	66
5.	Severstal Cherepovets	34	16	1	7	1	9	89	72	58
6.	Neftekhimik Nizhnekamsk	34	15	2	7	2	8	82	72	58
7.	Lokomotiv Yaroslavl	34	14	3	5	1	11	89	64	54
8.	HC Mechel Chelyabinsk	34	16	2	0	2	14	79	72	54
9.	Metallurg Novokuznetsk	34	14	0	7	1	12	84	66	50
10.	Amur Khabarovsk	34	13	1	4	3	13	53	62	48
11.	Torpedo Nizhny Novgorod	34	12	2	6	1	13	75	78	47
12.	Salavat Yulaev Ufa	34	11	3	7	1	12	76	85	47
13.	HC Dynamo Moscow	34	11	2	3	2	16	67	87	42
14.	HC CSKA Moscow	34	10	1	7	2	14	57	65	41
15.	Molot-Prikamye Perm	34	11	0	6	0	17	83	97	39
16.	Dinamo-Energija Yekaterinburg	34	9	0	4	2	19	59	95	33
17.	Vityaz Podolsk	34	6	1	3	1	23	56	98	24
18.	SKA St. Petersburg	34	2	0	0	2	30	50	153	8

== Second round ==
=== Group A ===
	Club	GP	W	OTW	T	OTL	L	GF	GA	Pts
1.	Metallurg Magnitogorsk	10	6	1	0	0	3	32	18	20
2.	Ak Bars Kazan	10	5	0	1	1	3	24	19	17
3.	Neftekhimik Nizhnekamsk	10	5	0	2	0	3	21	17	17
4.	Avangard Omsk	10	3	1	1	0	5	19	23	12
5.	HC Lada Togliatti	10	3	0	3	0	4	18	27	12
6.	Severstal Cherepovets	10	2	0	1	1	6	19	29	8

=== Group B ===
	Club	GP	W	OTW	T	OTL	L	GF	GA	Pts
7.	Lokomotiv Yaroslavl	10	5	1	1	1	2	29	20	19
8.	HC Mechel Chelyabinsk	10	5	0	2	1	2	27	22	18
9.	Amur Khabarovsk	10	4	1	1	0	3	26	28	15
10.	Metallurg Novokuznetsk	10	4	1	0	0	5	30	26	14
11.	Salavat Yulaev Ufa	10	3	0	1	2	4	27	32	12
12.	Torpedo Nizhny Novgorod	10	2	1	1	0	5	25	36	9

=== Group C ===
	Club	GP	W	OTW	T	OTL	L	GF	GA	Pts
13.	HC Dynamo Moscow	10	7	0	1	0	2	25	18	22
14.	Molot-Prikamye Perm	10	5	0	0	2	3	32	25	17
15.	SKA St. Petersburg	10	4	1	1	0	4	19	17	15
16.	HC CSKA Moscow	10	3	1	3	0	3	24	20	14
17.	Vityaz Podolsk	10	3	1	2	1	3	21	24	14
18.	Dinamo-Energija Yekaterinburg	10	1	0	1	0	8	14	31	4

== Playoffs ==
Quarterfinals
1	Metallurg Magnitogorsk	3
8	HC Mechel Chelyabinsk	0
3	Neftekhimik Nizhnekamsk	1
6	Severstal Cherepovets	3
4	Avangard Omsk	3
5	HC Lada Togliatti	2
2	Ak Bars Kazan	1
7	Lokomotiv Yaroslavl	3

Semifinals
1	Metallurg Magnitogorsk	3
6	Severstal Cherepovets	0
4	Avangard Omsk	3
7	Lokomotiv Yaroslavl	2

Final
1	Metallurg Magnitogorsk	4
4	Avangard Omsk	2

3rd place: Severstal Cherepovets – Lokomotiv Yaroslavl 1:0, 2:2
