= 2004–05 Russian Superleague season =

- League: Russian Superleague
- Sport: Ice hockey
- Duration: September 1, 2004 – April 8, 2005
- Number of teams: 16

Regular season
- Season champions: HC Dynamo Moscow

Playoffs

Final
- Champions: HC Dynamo Moscow
- Runners-up: HC Lada Togliatti

Russian Superleague seasons
- ← 2003–04 2005–06 →

The 2004–05 Russian Superleague season was the ninth season of the Russian Superleague, the top level of ice hockey in Russia. 16 teams participated in the league, and HC Dynamo Moscow won the championship.

== Regular season ==
	Club	GP	W	OTW	T	OTL	L	GF	GA	Pts
1.	HC Dynamo Moscow	60	35	5	7	4	9	179	106	126
2.	HC Lada Togliatti	60	35	1	11	0	13	140	86	118
3.	Metallurg Magnitogorsk	60	34	2	5	4	15	193	124	115
4.	Ak Bars Kazan	60	34	3	5	1	17	174	113	114
5.	Lokomotiv Yaroslavl	60	29	2	12	2	15	159	104	105
6.	HC Avangard Omsk	60	29	3	10	1	17	182	148	104
7.	Metallurg Novokuznetsk	60	26	1	12	2	19	129	126	94
8.	Neftekhimik Nizhnekamsk	60	26	2	7	2	23	141	130	91
9.	Khimik Voskresensk	60	25	1	6	0	28	129	157	83
10.	HC CSKA Moscow	60	21	3	9	3	24	156	147	81
11.	Severstal Cherepovets	60	21	2	10	3	24	138	144	80
12.	SKA St. Petersburg	60	22	1	5	3	29	133	169	76
13.	Salavat Yulaev Ufa	60	19	1	7	2	31	114	156	68
14.	HC Sibir Novosibirsk	60	12	2	12	2	32	97	138	54
15.	HC Spartak Moscow	60	10	0	10	2	38	89	164	42
16.	Molot-Prikamye Perm	60	5	2	4	0	49	81	222	23

== Playoffs ==
Quarterfinals
1	HC Dynamo Moscow	3
8	Neftekhimik Nizhnekamsk	0
3	Metallurg Magnitogorsk	2
6	HC Avangard Omsk	3
2	HC Lada Togliatti	3
7	Metallurg Novokuznetsk	1
4	Ak Bars Kazan	2
5	Lokomotiv Yaroslavl	3

Semifinals
1	HC Dynamo Moscow	3
6	HC Avangard Omsk	1
2	HC Lada Togliatti	3
5	Lokomotiv Yaroslavl	0

Final
1	HC Dynamo Moscow	3
2	HC Lada Togliatti	0

3rd place: HC Avangard Omsk − Lokomotiv Yaroslavl 0:2 (3:6, 4:5)
