= 2002–03 Russian Superleague season =

- League: Russian Superleague
- Sport: Ice hockey
- Duration: September 11, 2002 – April 9, 2003
- Number of teams: 18

Regular season
- Season champions: Lokomotiv Yaroslavl

Playoffs

Final
- Champions: Lokomotiv Yaroslavl
- Runners-up: Severstal Cherepovets

Russian Superleague seasons
- ← 2001–02 2003–04 →

The 2002–03 Russian Superleague season was the seventh season of the Russian Superleague, the top level of ice hockey in Russia. 18 teams participated in the league, and Lokomotiv Yaroslavl won the championship for the second season in a row.

== Regular season ==
	Club	GP	W	OTW	T	OTL	L	GF	GA	Pts
1.	Lokomotiv Yaroslavl	51	32	2	7	3	7	163	90	110
2.	Avangard Omsk	51	27	5	6	2	11	163	114	99
3.	Severstal Cherepovets	51	28	3	6	3	11	143	96	99
4.	Ak Bars Kazan	51	26	4	7	1	13	156	106	94
5.	HC Lada Togliatti	51	26	2	7	3	13	110	72	92
6.	Metallurg Magnitogorsk	51	23	2	8	4	14	121	101	85
7.	HC Dynamo Moscow	51	22	3	11	1	14	123	102	84
8.	Salavat Yulaev Ufa	51	20	3	9	2	17	107	87	77
9.	Metallurg Novokuznetsk	51	16	6	8	1	20	126	124	69
10.	HC CSKA Moscow	51	20	0	6	3	22	123	119	67
11.	Amur Khabarovsk	51	17	3	9	1	21	113	122	67
12.	Neftekhimik Nizhnekamsk	51	17	3	6	0	25	108	136	63
13.	SKA St. Petersburg	51	17	2	2	4	26	97	117	61
14.	HC Sibir Novosibirsk	51	16	1	6	4	24	98	124	60
15.	HC Spartak Moscow	51	14	1	5	4	27	108	149	53
16.	HC Mechel Chelyabinsk	51	14	1	6	2	28	93	144	53
17.	Molot-Prikamye Perm	51	11	0	7	1	32	80	160	41
18.	PHC Krylya Sovetov Moscow	51	8	2	8	4	29	78	147	40

== Playoffs ==
Quarterfinals
1	Lokomotiv Yaroslavl	3
8	Salavat Yulaev Ufa	0
4	Ak Bars Kazan	2
5	HC Lada Togliatti	3
2	Avangard Omsk	3
7	HC Dynamo Moscow	2
3	Severstal Cherepovets	3
6	Metallurg Magnitogorsk	0

Semifinals
1	Lokomotiv Yaroslavl	3
5	HC Lada Togliatti	0
2	Avangard Omsk	2
3	Severstal Cherepovets	3

Final
1	Lokomotiv Yaroslavl	3
3	Severstal Cherepovets	1

3rd place: HC Lada Togliatti – Avangard Omsk 2:0 (4:1, 4:1)
