= 2001–02 Russian Superleague season =

- League: Russian Superleague
- Sport: Ice hockey
- Duration: September 12, 2001 – April 5, 2002
- Number of teams: 18

Regular season
- Season champions: Lokomotiv Yaroslavl

Playoffs

Final
- Champions: Lokomotiv Yaroslavl
- Runners-up: Ak Bars Kazan

Russian Superleague seasons
- ← 2000–01 2002–03 →

The 2001–02 Russian Superleague season was the sixth season of the Russian Superleague, the top level of ice hockey in Russia. 18 teams participated in the league, and Lokomotiv Yaroslavl won the championship.

== Standings ==
	Club	GP	W	OTW	T	OTL	L	GF	GA	Pts
1.	Lokomotiv Yaroslavl	51	35	2	6	2	6	167	80	117
2.	Ak Bars Kazan	51	30	1	7	2	11	151	88	101
3.	Avangard Omsk	51	27	3	11	2	8	156	93	100
4.	HC Lada Togliatti	51	28	3	5	0	15	121	77	95
5.	Metallurg Magnitogorsk	51	28	3	2	3	15	152	125	95
6.	Severstal Cherepovets	51	28	1	6	0	16	150	99	92
7.	HC Dynamo Moscow	51	24	4	6	3	14	127	98	89
8.	PHC Krylya Sovetov Moscow	51	26	1	3	3	18	128	113	86
9.	Salavat Yulaev Ufa	51	21	2	6	0	22	126	127	73
10.	Amur Khabarovsk	51	20	3	6	1	21	95	96	73
11.	HC Spartak Moscow	51	21	1	5	0	24	123	125	70
12.	Metallurg Novokuznetsk	51	17	2	10	2	20	104	109	67
13.	Neftekhimik Nizhnekamsk	51	17	0	2	4	28	112	131	57
14.	HC Mechel Chelyabinsk	51	12	2	7	3	27	100	137	50
15.	SKA St. Petersburg	51	13	2	2	1	33	87	147	46
16.	Molot-Prikamye Perm	51	13	1	4	1	32	93	157	46
17.	HC CSKA Moscow	51	10	1	4	0	36	100	206	36
18.	Torpedo Nizhny Novgorod	51	7	1	6	6	31	85	169	35

== Playoffs ==
Quarterfinal
1	Lokomotiv Yaroslavl	3
8	PHC Krylya Sovetov Moscow	0
4	HC Lada Togliatti	1
5	Metallurg Magnitogorsk	3
3	Avangard Omsk	3
6	Severstal Cherepovets	1
2	Ak Bars Kazan	3
7	HC Dynamo Moscow	0

Semifinal
1	Lokomotiv Yaroslavl	3
5	Metallurg Magnitogorsk	0
3	Avangard Omsk	2
2	Ak Bars Kazan	3

Final
1	Lokomotiv Yaroslavl	3
2	Ak Bars Kazan	0

3rd place: Metallurg Magnitogorsk – Avangard Omsk 1:1, 2:0
