= 1999–2000 Russian Superleague season =

- League: Russian Superleague
- Sport: Ice hockey
- Duration: September 8, 1999 – April 1, 2000
- Number of teams: 20

Regular season
- Season champions: HC Dynamo Moscow

Playoffs

Final
- Champions: HC Dynamo Moscow
- Runners-up: Ak Bars Kazan

Russian Superleague seasons
- ← 1998–99 2000–01 →

The 1999–2000 Russian Superleague season was the fourth season of the Russian Superleague, the top level of ice hockey in Russia. 20 teams participated in the league, and HC Dynamo Moscow won the championship.

== Regular season ==
	Club	GP	W	OTW	T	OTL	L	GF	GA	Pts
1.	HC Dynamo Moscow	38	26	0	4	2	6	121	62	84
2.	Ak Bars Kazan	38	25	1	3	1	8	144	82	81
3.	Metallurg Magnitogorsk	38	24	1	3	1	9	132	96	78
4.	Torpedo Yaroslavl	38	21	2	5	0	10	91	59	78
5.	Metallurg Novokuznetsk	38	20	3	2	1	12	121	98	69
6.	Avangard Omsk	38	20	1	6	0	11	116	101	68
7.	Severstal Cherepovets	38	19	1	7	1	10	101	66	67
8.	Molot-Prikamye Perm	38	19	1	7	0	11	107	78	66
9.	HC Lada Togliatti	38	20	0	4	1	13	113	71	65
10.	HC CSKA Moscow	38	17	1	4	1	15	81	88	58
11.	Amur Khabarovsk	38	13	4	3	3	15	89	85	53
12.	SKA St. Petersburg	38	14	2	4	3	15	72	76	53
13.	Torpedo Nizhny Novgorod	38	15	2	3	0	18	86	98	52
14.	Neftekhimik Nizhnekamsk	38	12	2	7	3	14	114	118	50
15.	HC Mechel Chelyabinsk	38	13	1	2	2	20	85	113	45
16.	Dinamo-Energija Yekaterinburg	38	11	0	6	3	18	73	101	42
17.	Salavat Yulaev Ufa	38	6	2	6	2	22	78	107	30
18.	CSK VVS Samara	38	9	0	2	1	26	60	109	30
19.	Kristall Elektrostal	38	3	2	3	1	29	70	150	17
20.	HC Lipetsk	38	3	1	5	1	28	50	146	17

== Playoffs ==
First round
1	HC Dynamo Moscow	3
16	Dinamo-Energija Yekaterinburg	0
8	Molot-Prikamye Perm	0
9	HC Lada Togliatti	3
4	Torpedo Yaroslavl	3
13	Torpedo Nizhny Novgorod	2
5	Metallurg Novokuznetsk	3
12	SKA St. Petersburg	1
3	Metallurg Magnitogorsk	3
14	Neftekhimik Nizhnekamsk	1
6	Avangard Omsk	3
11	Amur Khabarovsk	2
2	Ak Bars Kazan	3
15	HC Mechel Chelyabinsk	0
7	Severstal Cherepovets	3
10	HC CSKA Moscow	0

Quarterfinal
1	HC Dynamo Moscow	3
9	HC Lada Togliatti	1
4	Torpedo Yaroslavl	2
5	Metallurg Novokuznetsk	3
3	Metallurg Magnitogorsk	3
6	Avangard Omsk	0
2	Ak Bars Kazan	3
7	Severstal Cherepovets	2

Semifinal
1	HC Dynamo Moscow	3
5	Metallurg Novokuznetsk	2
3	Metallurg Magnitogorsk	2
2	Ak Bars Kazan	3

Final
1	HC Dynamo Moscow	4
2	Ak Bars Kazan	1

== Relegation ==
	Club	GP	W	OTW	T	OTL	L	GF	GA	Pts
1.	Vityaz Podolsk	14	11	0	0	0	3	48	28	33
2.	Salavat Yulaev Ufa	14	10	0	1	0	3	47	28	31
3.	CSK VVS Samara	14	9	0	0	1	4	31	29	28
4.	HC Spartak Moscow	14	6	0	2	1	5	38	31	21
5.	HC Sibir Novosibirsk	14	4	2	0	1	6	40	45	17
6.	Neftyanik Almetyevsk	14	5	0	1	0	8	28	30	16
7.	HC Lipetsk	14	3	0	3	0	8	25	33	12
8.	Kristall Elektrostal	14	1	1	1	0	11	20	50	6
