= 2003–04 Russian Superleague season =

- League: Russian Superleague
- Sport: Ice hockey
- Duration: September 10, 2003 – April 10, 2004
- Number of teams: 16

Regular season
- Season champions: Metallurg Magnitogorsk

Playoffs

Final
- Champions: HC Avangard Omsk
- Runners-up: Metallurg Magnitogorsk

Russian Superleague seasons
- ← 2002–03 2004–05 →

The 2003–04 Russian Superleague season was the eighth season of the Russian Superleague, the top level of ice hockey in Russia. 16 teams participated in the league, and HC Avangard Omsk won the championship.

== Regular season ==
	Club	GP	W	OTW	T	OTL	L	GF	GA	Pts
1.	Metallurg Magnitogorsk	60	35	2	4	1	18	176	129	114
2.	HC Lada Togliatti	60	30	2	8	5	15	120	95	107
3.	HC Avangard Omsk	60	29	2	12	2	15	181	135	105
4.	Metallurg Novokuznetsk	60	29	2	7	5	17	135	108	103
5.	Ak Bars Kazan	60	29	5	2	3	21	162	122	102
6.	HC Dynamo Moscow	60	28	2	12	1	17	133	108	101
7.	Lokomotiv Yaroslavl	60	27	2	9	1	21	156	123	95
8.	Neftekhimik Nizhnekamsk	60	27	2	5	3	23	140	133	93
9.	Salavat Yulaev Ufa	60	24	0	7	2	27	134	140	81
10.	HC CSKA Moscow	60	21	4	6	0	29	127	149	77
11.	HC Sibir Novosibirsk	60	18	2	14	3	23	105	128	75
12.	Khimik Voskresensk	60	18	3	9	4	26	117	153	73
13.	Severstal Cherepovets	60	19	4	5	3	29	135	152	73
14.	SKA St. Petersburg	60	16	4	10	3	27	124	151	69
15.	Amur Khabarovsk	60	16	1	9	2	32	107	150	61
16.	Torpedo Nizhny Novgorod	60	12	3	5	2	38	95	171	49

== Playoffs ==
Quarterfinals
1	Metallurg Magnitogorsk	3
8	Neftekhimik Nizhnekamsk	2
4	Metallurg Novokuznetsk	1
5	Ak Bars Kazan	3
2	HC Lada Togliatti	3
7	Lokomotiv Yaroslavl	0
3	HC Avangard Omsk	3
6	HC Dynamo Moscow	0

Semifinals
1	Metallurg Magnitogorsk	3
5	Ak Bars Kazan	1
2	HC Lada Togliatti	0
3	HC Avangard Omsk	3

Final
1	Metallurg Magnitogorsk	2
3	HC Avangard Omsk	3
