= Russian Superleague =

Defunct ice hockey league in Russia

- Countries: Russia
- Federation: IIHF (1996–2006)
- Founded: 1999
- Folded: 2008 (reorganized as KHL)
- No. of teams: 20
- Relegation to: Major League
- Championship: Russian Championship
- Associated title: Cup of Russia
- Recent champions: Salavat Yulaev Ufa (2007–08)
- Most successful club: Lokomotiv Yaroslavl, Metallurg Magnitogorsk (3)
- Website: www.fhr.ru

The Russian Superleague (Russian: Чемпионат России Суперлига, Russian Championship Superleague), commonly abbreviated as RSL, was the highest division of the main professional ice hockey league in Russia. It was considered the second-best league in the world, after the National Hockey League (NHL) of North America. It was a part of the Russian Pro Hockey League which was composed of three divisions — the Superleague, Major League (Vysshaya Liga), and First League (Pervaya Liga).

The league was rebranded after the 2007–08 season as the Kontinental Hockey League (KHL). The KHL absorbed all 20 teams from the previous RSL season, for a total of 24 for its inaugural campaign.

== History ==
The origins of the Superleague are in the old Soviet League, which was founded in 1946. The Soviet era was dominated by the Red Army-affiliated CSKA Moscow, who won 32 of the 46 championships. The league lasted until 1992 due to the Soviet Union's collapse. After its transformation into the International Hockey League, the league was rechristened the Russian Hockey League in 1996. From 1996 to 1999, league membership was Russian-only. In 1999, membership was open and the league went international, and was renamed the Russian Superleague. Journalist Vsevolod Kukushkin acted as a press secretary for the league.

== Teams (2007–08) ==
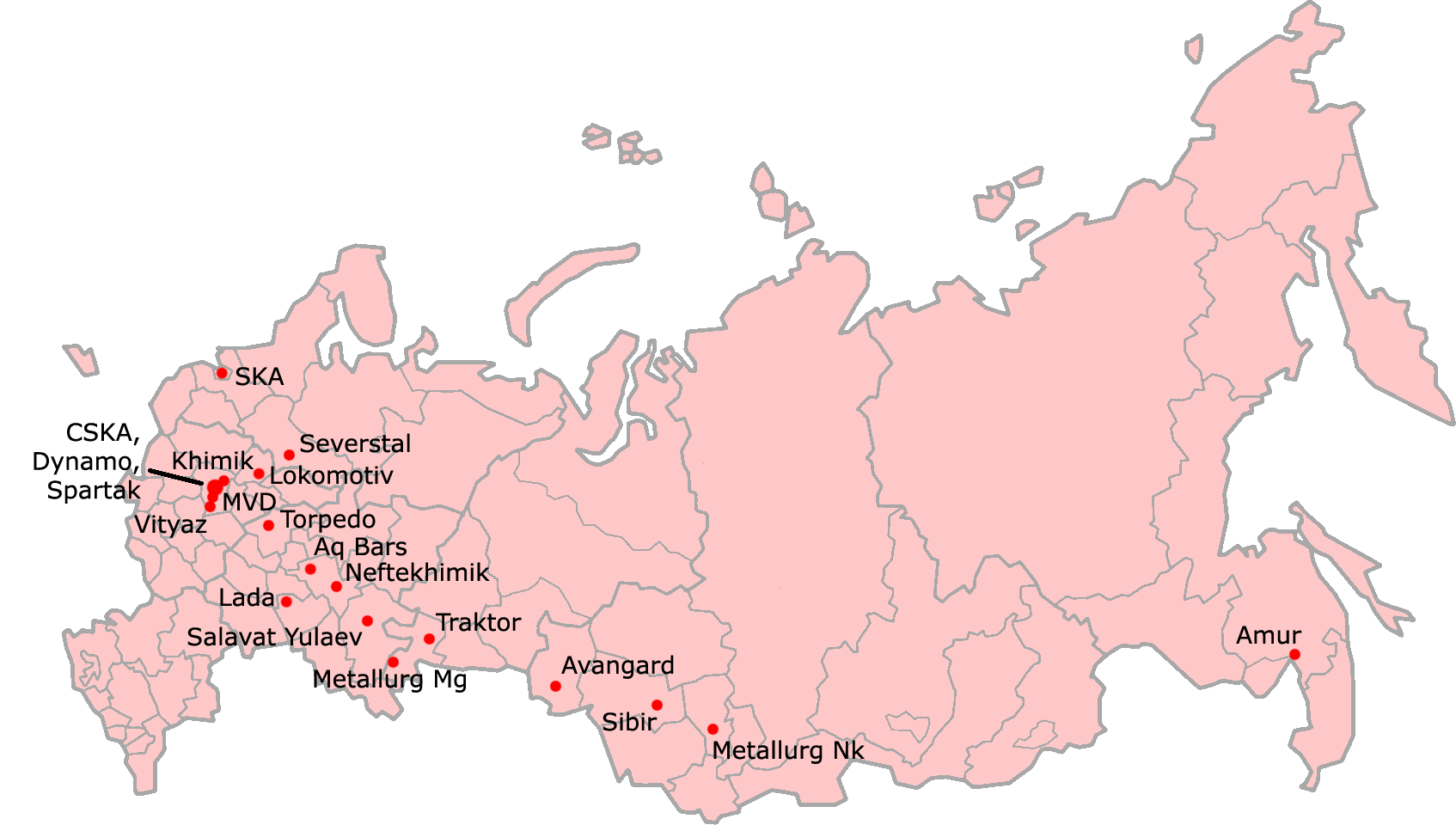
Location of the league teams (click to enlarge).

There were 20 teams in the Superleague in 2007–08.

- Amur Khabarovsk
- Avangard Omsk
- Ak Bars Kazan
- CSKA Moscow
- Dynamo Moscow
- Khimik Moscow Oblast
- Lada Togliatti
- Lokomotiv Yaroslavl
- Metallurg Magnitogorsk
- Metallurg Novokuznetsk
- MVD Moscow Oblast
- Neftekhimik Nizhnekamsk
- Salavat Yulaev Ufa
- Severstal Cherepovets
- Sibir Novosibirsk
- SKA Saint Petersburg
- Spartak Moscow
- Torpedo Nizhny Novgorod
- Traktor Chelyabinsk
- Vityaz Chekhov

== Competition ==
The competition consisted of the regular season and the play-off. The games were played in accordance with the International Ice Hockey Federation (IIHF) rules.

During the regular season, each team faced each other team three times (twice at home/once away, or once at home/twice away). Each team played 57 games during the regular season. If a game was drawn, a five-minute sudden-death overtime was played, followed by a shootout. Three points were awarded for a win in regulation, two points for an overtime or shootout win, one point for an overtime or shootout loss, and no points for a loss in regulation.

The 16 teams with the best regular-season records qualified for the playoffs. Each playoff round was a best-of-five series. In each round, the teams were paired according to the regular season performance. The top team was paired with the bottom team, the second-ranked team was paired with the team with the second worst regular-season performance, and so on. The higher-ranked team played Games One, Two, and Five on home ice.

== Champions ==
=== Russian Super League champions ===
- 2008 — Salavat Yulaev Ufa
- 2007 — Metallurg Magnitogorsk
- 2006 — Ak Bars Kazan
- 2005 — Dynamo Moscow
- 2004 — Avangard Omsk
- 2003 — Lokomotiv Yaroslavl
- 2002 — Lokomotiv Yaroslavl
- 2001 — Metallurg Magnitogorsk
- 2000 — Dynamo Moscow
- 1999 — Metallurg Magnitogorsk
- 1998 — Ak Bars Kazan (Cup of Russia — Metallurg Magnitogorsk)
- 1997 — Torpedo Yaroslavl (since 2000 named as Lokomotiv Yaroslavl)

== Players with most championships ==
Four-time winners:

- Igor Shadilov 2000, 2005, 2006, 2008
- Alexei Tereshchenko 2000, 2005, 2006, 2008
- Vladimir Antipov 1997, 2002, 2003, 2008

== Video games ==
Teams from the league are playable in NHL 09.

== See also ==
- Russian Elite Hockey Scoring Champion
- Russian Elite Hockey Goal Scoring Champion

Preceded by International Hockey League	Russian Superleague; 1996–2008	Succeeded by Kontinental Hockey League
