= Avangard Omsk =

Ice hockey team based in Omsk, Russia

- Nickname: Ястребы/Yastreby (The Hawks)
- City: Omsk, Russia
- League: KHL
- Conference: Eastern
- Division: Chernyshev
- Founded: 1950
- Home arena: G-Drive Arena (capacity: 12,011)
- Colours
- Owner: Gazprom Neft
- General manager: Alexei Sopin
- Head coach: Guy Boucher
- Captain: Damir Sharipzyanov
- Affiliates: Omskie Krylia (VHL); Omskie Yastreby (MHL); Yastreby Omsk (NMHL)
- Website: hawk.ru

Franchise history
- 1950–1962: Spartak Omsk
- 1962–1967: Aeroflot Omsk
- 1967–1972: Kauchuk Omsk
- 1972–1974: Khimik Omsk
- 1974–1981: Shinnik Omsk
- 1981–present: Avangard Omsk

Hockey Club Avangard (Russian: ХК Авангард, Vanguard), also known as Avangard Omsk, is a professional ice hockey club based in Omsk, Russia. It is a member of the Chernyshev Division in the Kontinental Hockey League (KHL).

== Franchise history ==
=== Early years of Omsk hockey (1950–1972) ===
The first amateur ice hockey teams in Omsk began to appear in 1950, formed by local bandy players. One of them was a hockey section of the Omsk Spartak sports society. Spartak Omsk was chosen to be the first Omsk hockey team in the 1950–51 RSFSR championship. In the 1955–56 season, the team had a chance to represent the city in the Soviet Championship, joining its then-second level Class B league and recruiting the best hockey players from Omsk. Four seasons later, the team finally won promotion to the top division.

Its first game in the major Soviet championship Spartak played on November 29, 1959, against Spartak (later Avtomobilist) Sverdlovsk. The first goal for Avangard was scored by Viktor Shevelev. In 1962, the team was assigned with a trade union of the Omsk airport and renamed as Aeroflot Omsk. Playing under its new name, the Omsk team reached 13th place overall, its highest success during the original four-season run in the top level of Soviet hockey. However, it was still not enough to secure their position in Class A after the subsequent reform of the championship—starting with the 1963–64 season, Aeroflot joined a newly established A2 league.

Further realignment in 1966 drove Aeroflot out to the third-level competition (the third group of Class A). The next season, 1967–68, the team was renamed once again as Kauchuk (Rubber) reflecting the change of the team's assignment to the Sibirsky Kauchuk combine. Shortly after, for the 1969–70 season, the team was taken over by Yevgeny Babich, who finished his coaching career in Omsk.

=== Late Soviet era (1972–1991) ===
In order to improve the performance of Omsk in the Soviet championship, Kauchuk, in 1972, was merged with rival Lokomotiv Omsk into a single team called Khimik ("Chemist"). It led to an immediate promotion of the team in 1973. The next season was notable for being the first in the second-level league after a seven years break, as well as the first to be played on artificial ice, although the games were still held at an outdoor stadium.

In 1975, Khimik Omsk was given to the Omsk Tire Factory and subsequently was renamed Shinnik ("Tiremaker"). In 1981, the team then affiliated with Omsktransmash and received its current name, Avangard Omsk. In 1987, the players moved to the long-awaited Irtysh Sports Complex, the team's first indoor arena.

=== Major league breakthrough (1991–1997) ===
In 1990, after 27 years of balancing between the second and the third divisions of Soviet hockey, Avangard was finally given the opportunity to play in the qualification tournament for the top league. Even though Omsk players were not successful at the time, the team was ultimately promoted to the top league after the 1991 series and joined the first and the last CIS championship. During that season, Leonid Kiselev's Avangard surpassed the success of the 1960s Aeroflot, rising up to 12th place in the league.

Kiselev continued to coach Avangard on its way to become an acknowledged major club in the International Hockey League. For its inaugural season, the team was joined by Evgeni Shastin, a 1980s Soviet hockey star and an Omsk hockey school alumnus. Finishing third in the Eastern Conference, Omsk went on to the playoffs and advanced to the quarterfinals. After a lacklustre 1993–94 season, Avangard repeated that success in 1995 becoming second in the East and returning to the quarterfinals, where it was eventually defeated by that year's champions, Dynamo Moscow.

The history of the 1990s' Avangard team culminated in the 1995–96 season. Despite finishing second in the Eastern Conference, the team was tied in points with Ufa's Salavat Yulaev after the final round (it was the only IHL season when the championship was decided separately from the cup playoffs), which led to a minor conflict between the teams and the league that was resolved when both Avangard and Salavat receiving bronze medals. The main stars of that first-ever medal roster of Omsk were Nikolai Marinenko, Oleg Kryazhev and Andrei Rasolko.

During the next season, the first in the newly established Superleague of the Russian Championship, Avangard was joined by forward Maxim Sushinsky, the most successful player of the upcoming era in the club's history.

=== Omsk Hawks (1997–2008) ===
After Kiselev's departure in October 1997, Anatoly Bardin became the team's new president, while IHL Cup-winning Head Coach Vladimir Golubovich took the head coach position. By the end of the season, the team finished sixth overall, but for the second season in a row lost in the quarterfinals to Metallurg Magnitogorsk. In the 1998–99 season, the newly refreshed Avangard launched a rebranding campaign under the Omskie Yastreby (Омские Ястребы, Omsk Hawks) banner, changing the logo to the present design and the team colours to black and red. Omsk ended up fourth in the regular championship tying with Dynamo Moscow and became third in the league by attendance, but yet again could not progress past the semifinals after a 2–1 series defeat to Torpedo Yaroslavl. In 1999, Golubovich's team also reached third in the IIHF Continental Cup, the second-level pan-European ice hockey club tournament, tying in points with that year's champions HC Ambrì-Piotta of Switzerland.

In the course of the 1999–2000 season, the club opted to switch coaches in favour of Gennady Tsygurov, who came to rebuild the team, turning to a young generation of local Omsk players, including future talents such as Alexander Svitov and Egor Shastin. Even though the replacement damaged the club's position in the season table and failed to help Avangard progress past the quarterfinals against rivals Metallurg Magnitogorsk, the team's line of Dmitry Zatonsky, Ravil Yakubov and Maxim Sushinsky still finished the year as the most productive line in the league. During Tsygurov's tenure, Yakubov was later replaced by Alexander Prokopiev to form one of the most potent lines in the club's history. In the 2001–02 season, Avangard's top trio was named the most productive line of the league. Its leader, Maxim Sushinsky, became a playoff MVP in both the 2000–01 and 2001–02 seasons, also being picked for the 2002 Superleague All-Star Team. In 2000–01, the Hawks were also joined by native Omsk defenceman Kirill Koltsov, that season's rookie of the year. In 2001, the team led by Sushinsky became the first Avangard team to reach the championship finals but lost to Magnitogorsk 4–2. The next season was less successful for Omsk as they were once again stopped in the semifinals by Magnitogorsk.

During the early 2000s, Avangard became one of the first Russian hockey clubs to invite high-profile foreign players. Prior to the 2001–02 season, they signed 2000 World Championship MVP Martin Procházka and in 2002, he was joined by two more Czech national team players—Pavel Patera and Tomáš Vlasák. Former teammates with HC Kladno and AIK IF Patera and Procházka formed an all-Czech forward line for Omsk. The team's Czech reinforcement of 2002 was finalized when famed Olympic-winning coach Ivan Hlinka became Avangard's new head coach.

Despite relative success of Hlinka's Avangard in both regular season and postseason performance, the line of Procházka Patera and Vlasák line was named the most productive line in the league, with Vlasák leading the league in points. During the year's playoffs, in the quarterfinals against Dynamo Moscow, Avangard became the first RSL team ever to win a series after being behind two games to none. During the 2003 playoffs' semifinals, the team was not able to defeat a significantly weaker Severstal Cherepovets team and eventually lost the third-place series to Magnitogorsk. Finishing the season, Hlinka decided to retire as a coach in favour of his career as an agent.

Avangard Omsk won the RSL title in 2004, which qualified them for the inaugural IIHF European Champions Cup. They would be the first winners of that competition, beating Kärpät from the Finnish SM-liiga.

Metallurg Magnitogorsk, Sibir Novosibirsk, Salavat Yulaev Ufa, Ak Bars Kazan and, to a lesser extent, Vityaz Chekhov, are considered to be Avangard's fiercest rivals in the KHL.

=== KHL history (2008–present) ===
==== 2008–09 ====
This season is considered to be one of the worst in franchise history, with the club's reputation being tarnished both on and off the ice. During the summer, Anatoly Bardin, Omsk's general manager, was kept busy bringing 18 new players in, including former Pittsburgh Penguins superstar Jaromír Jágr, goaltender John Grahame and forward Stanislav Chistov.

After an unconvincing start, Head Coach Sergey Gersonskiy was fired just six games into the season. He would later start legal proceedings against the club to obtain the compensation that he was allegedly entitled to under his contract. After a number of hearings and appeals, Gersonskiy was awarded 1 million rubles, only a small proportion of what he originally claimed. The Canadian Wayne Fleming was promptly appointed as new head coach.

On October 13, 2008, young Avangard forward Alexei Cherepanov died after collapsing on the bench during a game against Vityaz Chekhov. He played a shift with teammate Jaromír Jágr, and the two were talking on the bench shortly after they left the ice when Cherepanov suddenly collapsed. After being attended to on the bench, he was carried to the dressing room where he was revived for several brief moments before finally being rushed to an intensive care unit, though it was too late. The ambulance that was normally at all games had already departed and had to be called back; doctors arrived on the scene 12 minutes after Cherepanov collapsed, and the battery on the defibrillator used to attempt to shock Cherepanov's heart back to life was drained. It took approximately 20 minutes to get him to a hospital. While in the care of Chekhov doctors, he was again resuscitated briefly on two occasions before ultimately passing.

On December 29, 2008, Russian investigators revealed that he suffered from myocarditis, a condition where not enough blood reaches the heart, and that he should not have been playing hockey professionally. The federal Investigative Committee also announced that a chemical analysis of Cherepanov's blood and urine samples allowed experts to conclude "that for several months Alexei Cherepanov engaged in doping." Official sources have stated the banned substance taken was nikethamide, a stimulant, and that it had been taken three hours prior to the game in which he passed.

Avangard Director Mikhail Denisov has since been fired, whereas the league Disciplinary Committee has since removed Omsk's doctors from that role with the club, and has requested the suspension of General Manager Anatoly Bardin and Avangard President Konstantin Potapov until the investigation being conducted by the Russian Federal Prosecutor's Office was concluded. Anatoly Bardin was eventually reinstated as the club's GM.

Meanwhile, Avangard's poor performance on the ice continued. This resulted in a bizarre incident when Anatoly Bardin asked Wayne Fleming to leave the bench during the second intermission of a home game against Vityaz Chekhov. In just under a month, the head coach was relieved of his duties, replaced by the inexperienced Igor Nikitin. Having finished the regular season on the 16th place, Avangard only just managed to qualify for the playoffs. However, the team surprised everyone by knocking the regular season champions Salavat Yulaev Ufa out of the competition by winning three games to one. Moreover, the team was just 15 seconds away from defeating Ak Bars Kazan, the future champion of 2009, in the second round but failed to hold on to their one-goal lead and went on to concede an overtime goal in the deciding match at TatNeft Arena.

==== 2009–10 ====
The club made a few solid roster additions by signing Karri Rämö with Lasse Kukkonen in the summer and Anton Babchuk with Denis Kulyash during the season. A lack of quality in the forward position, however, soon became apparent on the team, as Head Coach Igor Nikitin was struggling to find players matching Jaromír Jágr's ability to play on the first line, and the team found it difficult to achieve the results that fans expected.

On January 9, 2010, a massive brawl broke out in a game against Vityaz Chekhov. The initial conflict began during pre-game warm-ups, when Darcy Verot intentionally shot a puck at Lasse Kukkonen, prompting Alexander Svitov to stand up for his teammate, Kukkonen. Soon after the game began, Brandon Sugden challenged Svitov to a fight, which then escalated to involve all other eight skaters on the ice. A number of other fights then ensued, resulting in a bench- and penalty-box clearing brawl. The officials were forced to suspend the game just after three minutes and 39 seconds in the first period as only four players between the two sides were left to play the game. A world-record total of 840 penalty minutes were incurred during the game. In the game's wake, the KHL imposed heavy fines on both organizations, multiple players on both teams and both clubs' head coaches, as well as deciding to suspend six Vityaz players and Avangard's Dmitri Vlasenkov, who was first to leave the bench during a fight. The KHL also credited the game as a 5–0 defeat for both teams, with no points being awarded.

The brawl, however, appeared to give the team a morale boost as they went on to win the next six games. Nonetheless, mediocrity soon returned, and Nikitin was fired and replaced by Raimo Summanen just hours before the playoffs started. The new head coach failed to deliver as the team suffered three-straight defeats at the hands of Neftekhimik Nizhnekamsk and was eliminated in the first round.

== Season-by-season record ==
Note: GP = Games played, W = Wins, OTW = Overtime/shootout wins, OTL = Overtime/shootout losses, L = Losses, GF = Goals for, GA = Goals against, Pts = Points

Season	GP	W	OTW	L	OTL	Pts	GF	GA	Finish	Top scorer	Playoffs
2008–09	56	19	8	24	5	78	161	164	4th, Kharlamov	Jaromír Jágr (53 points: 25 G, 28 A; 55 GP)	Lost in Conference Semifinals, 2–3 (Ak Bars Kazan)
2009–10	56	24	4	18	10	90	152	128	2nd, Chernyshev	Jaromír Jágr (42 points: 22 G, 20 A; 51 GP)	Lost in Conference Quarterfinals, 0–3 (Neftekhimik Nizhnekamsk)
2010–11	54	31	11	9	3	118	176	120	1st, Chernyshev	Roman Červenka (60 points: 31 G, 30 A; 51 GP)	Lost in Conference Semifinals, 3–4 (Metallurg Magnitogorsk)
2011–12	54	26	5	18	5	93	133	115	1st, Chernyshev	Roman Červenka (39 points: 23 G, 16 A; 54 GP)	Lost in Gagarin Cup Finals, 3–4 (Dynamo Moscow)
2012–13	52	26	9	11	6	102	149	121	1st, Chernyshev	Tomáš Záborský (41 points: 21 G, 20 A; 52 GP)	Lost in Conference Semifinals, 1–4 (Traktor Chelyabinsk)
2013–14	54	17	6	25	6	69	136	162	5th, Chernyshev	Alexander Perezhogin (36 points: 16 G, 20 A; 53 GP)	Did not qualify (won Nadezhda Cup)
2014–15	60	30	5	17	8	108	172	139	2nd, Chernyshev	Denis Parshin (56 points: 25 G, 31 A; 60 GP)	Lost in Conference Semifinals, 1–4 (Ak Bars Kazan)
2015–16	60	27	6	14	13	106	156	120	1st, Chernyshev	Alexander Perezhogin (36 points: 15 G, 21 A; 56 GP)	Lost in Conference Semifinals, 3–4 (Salavat Yulaev Ufa)
2016–17	60	30	8	19	3	109	156	127	1st, Chernyshev	Nikolai Lemtyugov (31 points: 19 G, 12 A; 52 GP)	Lost in Conference Semifinals, 2–4 (Ak Bars Kazan)
2017–18	56	22	7	19	8	88	146	116	2nd, Chernyshev	Ilya Mikheyev (38 points: 19 G, 19 A; 54 GP)	Lost in Conference Quarterfinals, 3–4 (Salavat Yulaev Ufa)
2018–19	62	29	10	18	5	83	177	133	2nd, Chernyshev	Ilya Mikheyev (45 points: 23 G, 22 A; 62 GP)	Lost in Gagarin Cup Finals, 0–4 (CSKA Moscow)
2019–20	62	30	7	16	9	83	163	120	2nd, Chernyshev	Kirill Semyonov (46 points: 16 G, 30 A; 62 GP)	Lost in Conference Quarterfinals, 2–4 (Salavat Yulaev Ufa)
2020–21	60	33	3	12	12	84	180	134	1st, Chernyshev	Reid Boucher (48 points; 24 G, 24 A; 51 GP)	Gagarin Cup Champions, 4–2 (CSKA Moscow)
2021–22	47	24	4	17	2	58	137	104	2nd, Chernyshev	Corban Knight (48 points: 18 G, 30 A; 47 GP)	Lost in Conference Semifinals, 3–4 (Metallurg Magnitogorsk)
2022–23	68	27	12	21	8	86	188	164	2nd, Chernyshev	Vladimir Tkachev (59 points: 23 G, 36 A; 64 GP)	Lost in Conference Finals, 1–4 (Ak Bars Kazan)
2023–24	68	31	12	19	6	92	211	181	1st, Chernyshev	Reid Boucher (78 points: 44 G, 34 A; 64 GP)	Lost in Semifinals, 3–4 (Lokomotiv Yaroslavl)
2024–25	68	31	10	22	5	87	205	168	2nd, Chernyshev	Reid Boucher (49 points: 28 G, 21 A; 52 GP)	Lost in Semifinals, 3–4 (Lokomotiv Yaroslavl)
2025–26	68	36	11	16	5	99	228	159	1st, Chernyshev	Konstantin Okulov (74 points: 24 G, 50 A; 68 GP)	Lost in Semifinals, 3–4 (Lokomotiv Yaroslavl)

== Players and personnel ==
=== Current roster ===
Updated 29 September 2026.

No.	Nat	Player	Pos	S/G	Age	Acquired	Birthplace
77	(Russia)	Kirill Adamchuk	D	L	32	2026	Tyumen, Russia
11	(Russia)	Egor Afanasyev	LW	L	25	2026	Tver, Russia
87	(Russia)	Gleb Burlaka	RW	L	19	2026	Donetsk, Ukraine
55	(United States)	Joseph Cecconi	D	R	29	2025	Youngstown, New York, United States
5	(Russia)	Daniil Chaika	D	L	23	2024	Moscow, Russia
66	(Russia)	Semyon Chistyakov	D	L	25	2020	Yekaterinburg, Russia
26	(Russia)	Kirill Dolzhenkov	RW	L	22	2026	Moscow, Russia
84	(Russia)	Mikhail Gulyayev	D	L	21	2022	Novosibirsk, Russia
28	(Russia)	Marsel Ibragimov	D	R	29	2025	Kazan, Russia
34	(Russia)	Artem Ilyenko	C	L	30	2026	Yaroslavl, Russia
76	(Russia)	Anton Kazachyok	D	L	23	2026	Omsk, Russia
86	(Russia)	Kirill Kozhevnikov	LW	L	27	2026	Nizhnevartovsk, Russia
58	(Canada)	Maxime Lajoie	D	L	28	2025	Quebec, Quebec, Canada
90	(Canada)	Josh Leivo	RW	R	33	2026	Innisfil, Ontario, Canada
78	(Russia)	Pavel Leuka	C	L	23	2024	Surgut, Russia
93	(Russia)	Vyacheslav Malov	C	L	22	2026	Novosibirsk, Russia
9	(Canada)	Michael McLeod	C	R	28	2024	Mississauga, Ontario, Canada
17	(Russia)	Konstantin Okulov	LW	L	31	2024	Novosibirsk, Russia
18	(Canada)	Cedric Paquette	C	L	33	2026	Gaspe, Quebec, Canada
92	(Russia)	Vasili Ponomaryov	C	L	24	2025	Moscow, Russia
22	(United States)	Andrew Poturalski	C	R	32	2025	Williamsville, New York, United States
74	(Russia)	Nikolai Prokhorkin	C	L	33	2023	Chelyabinsk, Russia
1	(Russia)	Ivan Prosvetov	G	L	27	2026	Moscow, Russia
96	(Russia)	Dmitri Rashevsky	RW	L	26	2025	Saint Petersburg, Russia
54	(Russia)	Nikita Serebryakov	G	L	30	2024	Moscow, Russia
44	(Russia)	Damir Sharipzyanov (C)	D	L	30	2020	Nizhnekamsk, Russia
95	(Russia)	Lev Starikov	D	L	26	2026	Kazan, Russia
83	(Russia)	Alexander Volkov	LW	L	29	2025	Moscow, Russia
65	(Russia)	Nail Yakupov	RW	L	32	2024	Nizhnekamsk, Russia

=== Head coaches ===
- (Soviet Union) Vladimir Kukushkin, 1955–58
- (Soviet Union) Valentin Skibinsky, 1958–60
- (Soviet Union) Vladimir Kukushkin, 1960–62
- (Soviet Union) Alexander Prilepsky, 1962–63
- (Soviet Union) Vladimir Murashov, 1963–64
- (Soviet Union) Mikhail Zaitsev, 1964
- (Soviet Union) Nikolai Koksharov, 1964–66
- (Soviet Union) Yevgeny Dzeyarsky, 1965–66
- (Soviet Union) Valentin Skibinsky, 1966–69
- (Soviet Union) Yevgeny Babich, 1969–70
- (Soviet Union) Ivan Krachevsky, 1970–74
- (Soviet Union) Yury Romanenko, 1974–76
- (Soviet Union) Mark Sudat, 1976–82
- (Soviet Union) Leonid Shchukin, 1982–83
- (Soviet Union) Alexander Tychkin, 1983–87
- (Soviet Union) / (Russia) Leonid Kiselev, 1987–97
- (Russia) Vladimir Golubovich, 1997–2000
- (Russia) Gennady Tsygurov, 2000–02
- (Czech Republic) Ivan Hlinka, 2002–03
- (Russia) Sergei Gersonsky, 2003
- (Russia) Valery Belousov, 2003–07
- (Russia) Sergei Gersonsky, 2007–08
- (Canada) Wayne Fleming, 2008–09
- (Kazakhstan) Igor Nikitin, 2009–10
- (Finland) Raimo Summanen, 2010–11
- (Czech Republic) Rostislav Čada, 2011
- (Finland) Raimo Summanen, 2011–12
- (Finland) Petri Matikainen, 2012–13
- (Czech Republic) Miloš Říha, 2013–14
- (Russia) Yevgeni Kornoukhov, 2014
- (Finland) Raimo Summanen, 2014–15
- (Russia) Yevgeni Kornoukhov, 2015–16
- (Russia) Fedor Kanareykin, 2016–17
- (Belarus) Andrei Skabelka, 2017
- (Russia) German Titov, 2017–18
- (Canada) Bob Hartley, 2018–2022
- (Russia) Dmitri Ryabykin, 2022
- (Russia) Mikhail Kravets, 2022–24
- (Russia) Sergei Zvyagin, 2024
- (Canada) Guy Boucher, 2024–present

=== Honored members ===
Avangard Omsk retired numbers
No.	Player	Position	Career	No. retirement
7	Alexei Cherepanov	RW	2006–2008	13 October 2008

== Sponsors and partners ==
In 2009, Gazprom Neft started partnership cooperation with Avangard hockey club, which includes support and development of youth and children teams. During the 12-year period of cooperation, the main team regularly played in the Gagarin Cup play-offs, made it to the finals twice, and won the KHL Championship and got the Gagarin Cup in 2020–2021 season.

Within the framework of this cooperation, Gazprom Neft promotes the company's brands, supports the development of the club academy, and in 2020 it started the construction of the new home arena for the club jointly with the federal government.

== Franchise records and leaders ==
=== Scoring leaders ===
These are the top-ten point-scorers in franchise history. Figures are updated after each completed KHL regular season.

Note: Pos = Position; GP = Games played; G = Goals; A = Assists; Pts = Points; P/G = Points per game; = current Avangard player

Points
Player	Pos	GP	G	A	Pts	P/G
(Russia) Alexander Popov	LW	376	80	166	246	0.65
(Russia) Alexander Perezhogin	RW	435	121	123	244	0.56
(United States) Reid Boucher	LW	231	127	103	230	0.99
(Russia) Damir Sharipzyanov	D	353	56	148	204	0.57
(Russia) Anton Kuryanov	C	292	65	90	155	0.53
(Czech Republic) Jaromír Jágr	RW	155	66	80	146	0.94
(Russia) Sergei Shirokov	RW	204	68	72	140	0.69
(Russia) Kirill Semyonov	C	305	57	83	140	0.46
(Russia) Vladimir Tkachev	LW	128	44	95	139	1.08
(Russia) Sergey Tolchinsky	LW	149	36	93	129	0.86

Goals
Player	Pos	G
(United States) Reid Boucher	LW	127
(Russia) Alexander Perezhogin	RW	121
(Russia) Alexander Popov	LW	80
(Russia) Sergei Shirokov	RW	68
(Czech Republic) Jaromír Jágr	RW	66
(Russia) Anton Kuryanov	C	65
(Russia) Ilya Mikheyev	RW	62
(Russia) Kirill Semyonov	C	57
(Russia) Damir Sharipzyanov	D	56
(Czech Republic) Roman Červenka	C	54

Assists
Player	Pos	A
(Russia) Alexander Popov	LW	166
(Russia) Damir Sharipzyanov	D	148
(Russia) Alexander Perezhogin	RW	123
(United States) Reid Boucher	LW	103
(Russia) Vladimir Tkachev	LW	95
(Russia) Sergey Tolchinsky	LW	93
(Russia) Anton Kuryanov	C	90
(Russia) Semyon Chistyakov	D	87
(Russia) Kirill Semyonov	C	83
(Czech Republic) Jaromír Jágr	RW	80

== Attendances ==
The HC Avangard average home league attendances by season:

Season	Average	% capacity
2024-25	11,666	97.13%
2023-24	11,702	97.43%
2022-23	11,527	96.06%

== Honors ==
=== Champions ===
- (gold) Gagarin Cup: 2021
- (gold) Russian Superleague: 2004
- (gold) KHL Continental Cup: 2011
- (gold) Opening Cup: 2019–20, 2021–22
- (gold) IIHF European Champions Cup: 2005
- (gold) Soviet League Class A2: 1990 (East)

=== Runners-up ===
- (silver) Gagarin Cup: 2012, 2019
- (silver) Russian Superleague: 2001, 2006
- (bronze) Russian Superleague: 2007
- (silver) IIHF Continental Cup: 2007
- (bronze) IHL: 1996
