= Vladimir Vikulov =

Soviet ice hockey player (1946–2013)

- Born: July 20, 1946 Moscow, Russian SFSR, Soviet Union
- Died: August 9, 2013 (aged 67)
- Height: 5 ft 9 in (175 cm)
- Weight: 172 lb (78 kg; 12 st 4 lb)
- Position: Right wing
- Shot: Left
- Played for: CSKA Moscow; SKA Leningrad
- National team: Soviet Union
- Playing career: 1963–1979
Medal record
Men's ice hockey
Representing Soviet Union
Olympic Games
Gold medal – first place	1968 Grenoble	Team
Gold medal – first place	1972 Sapporo	Team
World Championships
Gold medal – first place	1966 Ljubljana
Gold medal – first place	1967 Vienna
Gold medal – first place	1969 Stockholm
Gold medal – first place	1970 Stockholm
Gold medal – first place	1971 Bern
Silver medal – second place	1972 Prague

Vladimir Ivanovich Vikulov (July 20, 1946 – August 9, 2013) was an ice hockey player who played in the Soviet Hockey League.

He was born in Moscow, Soviet Union and played for HC CSKA Moscow. Vikulov led the Soviet league in goals in 1971–72, and was top goal scorer at the IIHF World Championships the same year. He was a Soviet all-star in 1970, 1971, and 1972, and an all-star at the world championships in 1971 and 1972. Vikulov tied for second in scoring at the 1968 Winter Olympics with 12 points in 7 games. He played in the 1972 Summit Series against NHL all-stars and the 1974 Summit Series against WHA all-stars. He was inducted into the Russian and Soviet Hockey Hall of Fame in 1967.

== Career statistics ==
=== Regular season ===
			Regular season
Season	Team	League	GP	G	A	Pts	PIM
1963–64	CSKA Moscow	Soviet	—	2	—	—	—
1964–65	CSKA Moscow	Soviet	—	1	—	—	—
1965–66	CSKA Moscow	Soviet	—	12	—	—	—
1966–67	CSKA Moscow	Soviet	—	27	—	—	—
1967–68	CSKA Moscow	Soviet	43	29	—	—	—
1968–69	CSKA Moscow	Soviet	40	13	—	—	—
1969–70	CSKA Moscow	Soviet	43	25	—	—	—
1970–71	CSKA Moscow	Soviet	39	19	—	—	—
1971–72	CSKA Moscow	Soviet	31	34	8	42	—
1972–73	CSKA Moscow	Soviet	32	21	19	40	—
1973–74	CSKA Moscow	Soviet	34	14	19	33	18
1974–75	CSKA Moscow	Soviet	36	17	23	40	26
1975–76	CSKA Moscow	Soviet	35	19	17	36	18
1976–77	CSKA Moscow	Soviet	35	22	18	40	12
1977–78	CSKA Moscow	Soviet	34	12	22	34	12
1978–79	CSKA Moscow	Soviet	33	12	10	22	14
1978–79	SKA Leningrad	Soviet	8	3	4	7	2
Soviet totals			441	282	140	422	102

=== International ===
Year	Team	Event	GP	G	A	Pts	PIM
1966	Soviet Union	WC	7	4	2	6	2
1967	Soviet Union	WC	7	6	6	12	8
1968	Soviet Union	OLY	7	2	10	12	2
1969	Soviet Union	WC	9	2	4	6	0
1970	Soviet Union	WC	10	9	5	14	0
1971	Soviet Union	WC	10	6	5	11	0
1972	Soviet Union	WC	10	12	4	16	0
1972	Soviet Union	OLY	5	5	3	8	0
1972	Soviet Union	SS	6	2	1	3	6
1974	Soviet Union	SS	4	0	4	4	0
1976	Soviet Union	CC	4	4	3	7	0
Senior totals			79	52	47	99	18
