= Vladimir Yurzinov =

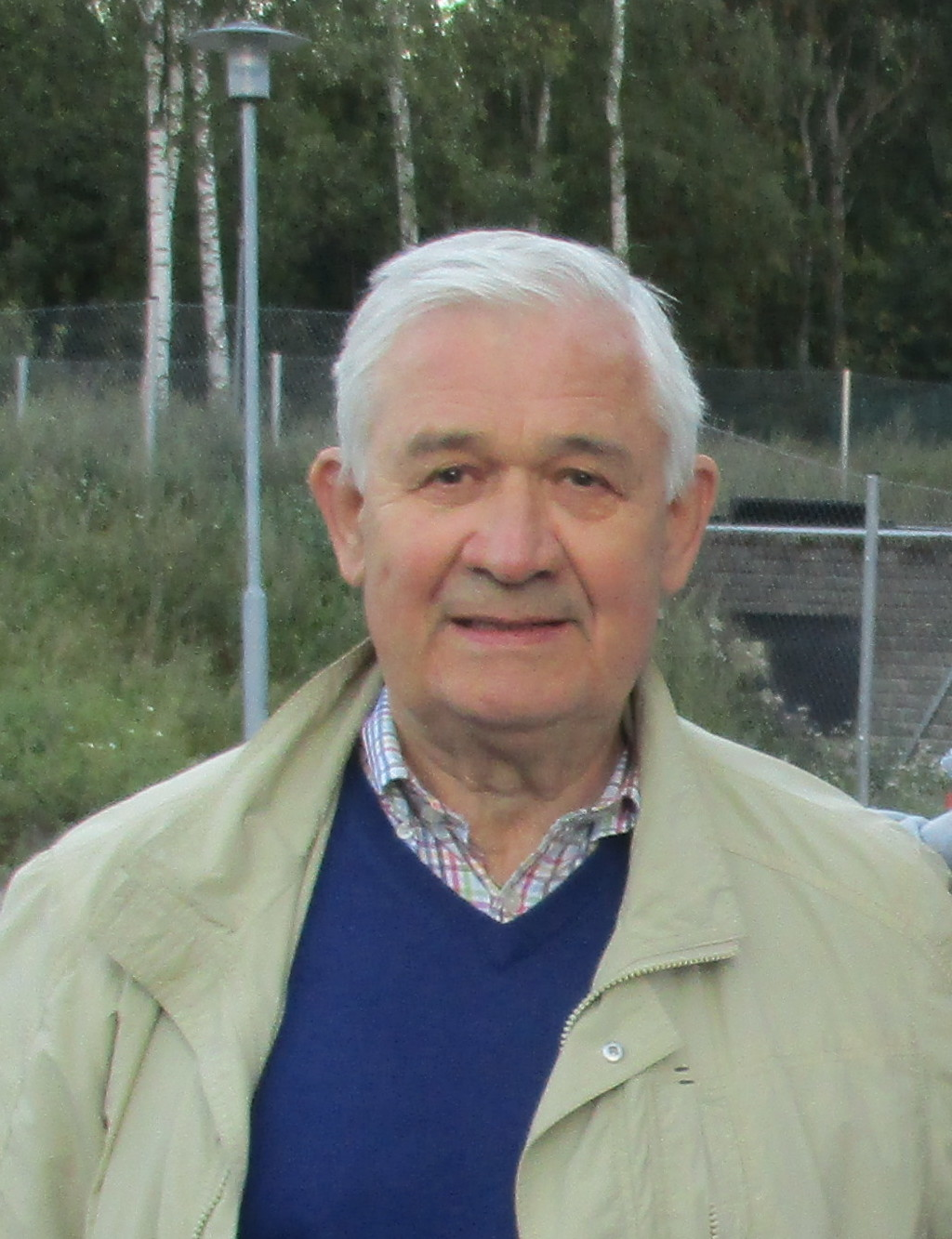
- Born: February 20, 1940 (age 85) Moscow, Russian SFSR, Soviet Union
- Height: 6 ft 0 in (183 cm)
- Weight: 205 lb (93 kg; 14 st 9 lb)
- Position: Centre
- Shot: Left
- Played for: Dynamo Moscow; Koovee
- National team: Soviet Union
- Playing career: 1957–1974

Vladimir Yurzinov (born February 20, 1940, in Moscow, Soviet Union) is a retired ice hockey player who played as a centre in the Soviet Hockey League. He played for HC Dynamo Moscow. He was inducted as a player into the Russian and Soviet Hockey Hall of Fame in 1963.

After his playing career Yurzinov started coaching. He was the coach of HC TPS from 1992 to 1998 and despite Hannu Jortikka having more championships, Yurzinov is widely considered the most legendary and successful coach of TPS by the team's supporters. In 1976, he was again inducted into the Russian and Soviet Hockey Hall of Fame but this time as a builder. He received the same honor in 2002 from the IIHF Hall of Fame.

== Career statistics ==
Season	Team	League	GP	G	A	Pts	SM
1957/58	Dynamo Moscow	Klass A	26	4	−	−	−
1958/59	Dynamo Moscow	Klass A	27	11	−	−	−
1959/60	Dynamo Moscow	Klass A	36	18	−	−	−
1960/61	Dynamo Moscow	Klass A	26	17	4	21	8
1961/62	Dynamo Moscow	Klass A	31	27	4	31	24
1962/63	Dynamo Moscow	Klass A	27	16	7	23	6
1963/64	Dynamo Moscow	Klass A	24	10	−	−	−
1964/65	Dynamo Moscow	Klass A	32	10	6	16	4
1965/66	Dynamo Moscow	Klass A	29	15	2	17	10
1966/67	Dynamo Moscow	Klass A	39	25	5	30	26
1967/68	Dynamo Moscow	Klass A	44	23	8	31	20
1968/69	Dynamo Moscow	Klass A	40	25	−	−	−
1969/70	Dynamo Moscow	Klass A	42	19	−	−	−
1970/71	Dynamo Moscow	Wysschaja Liga	39	16	7	23	8
1971/72	Dynamo Moscow	Wysschaja Liga	28	6	6	12	12
1972/73	Koovee	SM-sarja	35	13	13	26	31
1973/74	Koovee	SM-sarja	35	24	18	42	16
