= Nikolay Mikhaylovich Makarov =

- Born: December 19, 1948 (age 76); Cheliabinsk, USSR
- Position: Defence
- Shot: Left
- Played for: SHL; Traktor Chelyabinsk; SM-liiga; Jokerit
- Playing career: 1969–1984

Nikolay Mikhaylovich Makarov
Medal record

Representing Soviet Union

Men's ice hockey

World Championships
Gold medal – first place	1981 Sweden	Ice hockey

Nikolai Makarov (born December 19, 1948, in Cheliabinsk, Russia) is a retired ice hockey player who played in the Soviet Hockey League. He played for Traktor Chelyabinsk. He is the elder brother of the Soviet (and NHL) hockey legend Sergei Makarov.

== Playing career ==
=== Career in Soviet Union ===
Nikolai Makarov was a top Defenceman for Traktor Chelyabinsk during his time there. Makarov played in Soviet League from 1969 to 1982 as he had a 17-year career in Soviet top leagues.

Makarov also was part of the feared Soviet National Ice hockey Team in 1981 Ice Hockey World Championships.

=== Career in Finland ===
In 1982 Makarov was bought by SM-liiga team Jokerit. Makarov became a premier defenceman for Jokerit and was selected the best defenceman of the year in 1983. At the end of the regular season 1982–82, an opponent slashed his arm with his stick, causing a major injury, and Makarov was not able to recover fully before the play-off finals against IFK Helsinki, which Jokerit lost 3–2. One might speculate if Jokerit would have fared better in the finals, had Makarov been healthy throughout the series. The following year Makarov still played for Jokerit, but his play was visibly less energetic. At the end of his two years with Jokerit he retired from active playing in 1984.

Nikolai Makarov was inducted into the Russian and Soviet Hockey Hall of Fame in 1981.

== Career statistics ==
=== Regular season and playoffs ===
			Regular season					Playoffs
Season	Team	League	GP	G	A	Pts	PIM	GP	G	A	Pts	PIM
1966–67	Voskhod Chelyabinsk	USR.3	11	2	1	3	6	—	—	—	—	—
1967–68	Zvezda Chebarkul	USR.3	12	3	0	3	0	—	—	—	—	—
1968–69	Zvezda Chebarkul	USR.2		11				—	—	—	—	—
1969–70	Zvezda Chebarkul	USR.2		0				—	—	—	—	—
1969–70	Traktor Chelyabinsk	USR	28	4				—	—	—	—	—
1970–71	Traktor Chelyabinsk	USR	37	3	2	5		—	—	—	—	—
1971–72	Traktor Chelyabinsk	USR	31	4	6	10	12	—	—	—	—	—
1972–73	Traktor Chelyabinsk	USR	30	3	3	6	26	—	—	—	—	—
1973–74	Traktor Chelyabinsk	USR	31	8	4	12	22	—	—	—	—	—
1974–75	Traktor Chelyabinsk	USR	35	3	8	11	30	—	—	—	—	—
1975–76	Traktor Chelyabinsk	USR	33	8	4	12	20	—	—	—	—	—
1976–77	Traktor Chelyabinsk	USR	36	8	12	20	36	—	—	—	—	—
1977–78	Traktor Chelyabinsk	USR	36	10	6	16	39	—	—	—	—	—
1978–79	Traktor Chelyabinsk	USR	44	11	5	16	46	—	—	—	—	—
1979–80	Traktor Chelyabinsk	USR	43	15	9	24	46	—	—	—	—	—
1980–81	Traktor Chelyabinsk	USR	49	15	12	27	36	—	—	—	—	—
1981–82	Traktor Chelyabinsk	USR	56	21	18	39	44	—	—	—	—	—
1982–83	Jokerit	SM-l	31	20	14	34	44	8	0	1	1	8
1983–84	Jokerit	SM-l	32	14	14	28	49	—	—	—	—	—
1984–85	Metallurg Chelyabinsk	USR.3	47	25	13	38	96	—	—	—	—	—
1985–86	Metallurg Chelyabinsk	USR.2	46	22	14	36	52	—	—	—	—	—
1987–88	Metallurg Chelyabinsk	USR.2	29	6	11	17	38	—	—	—	—	—
USR totals			461	109	89	198	357	—	—	—	—	—
SM-l totals			63	24	38	62	93	8	0	1	1	8

- Soviet totals do not include numbers from the 1969–70 season.

=== International ===
Year	Team	Event	GP	G	A	Pts	PIM
1981	Soviet Union	WC	1	0	0	0	0

Preceded by Pertti Lehtonen	Winner of the Pekka Rautakallio trophy 1982-83	Succeeded by Tapio Levo
