= Vladimir Kovin =

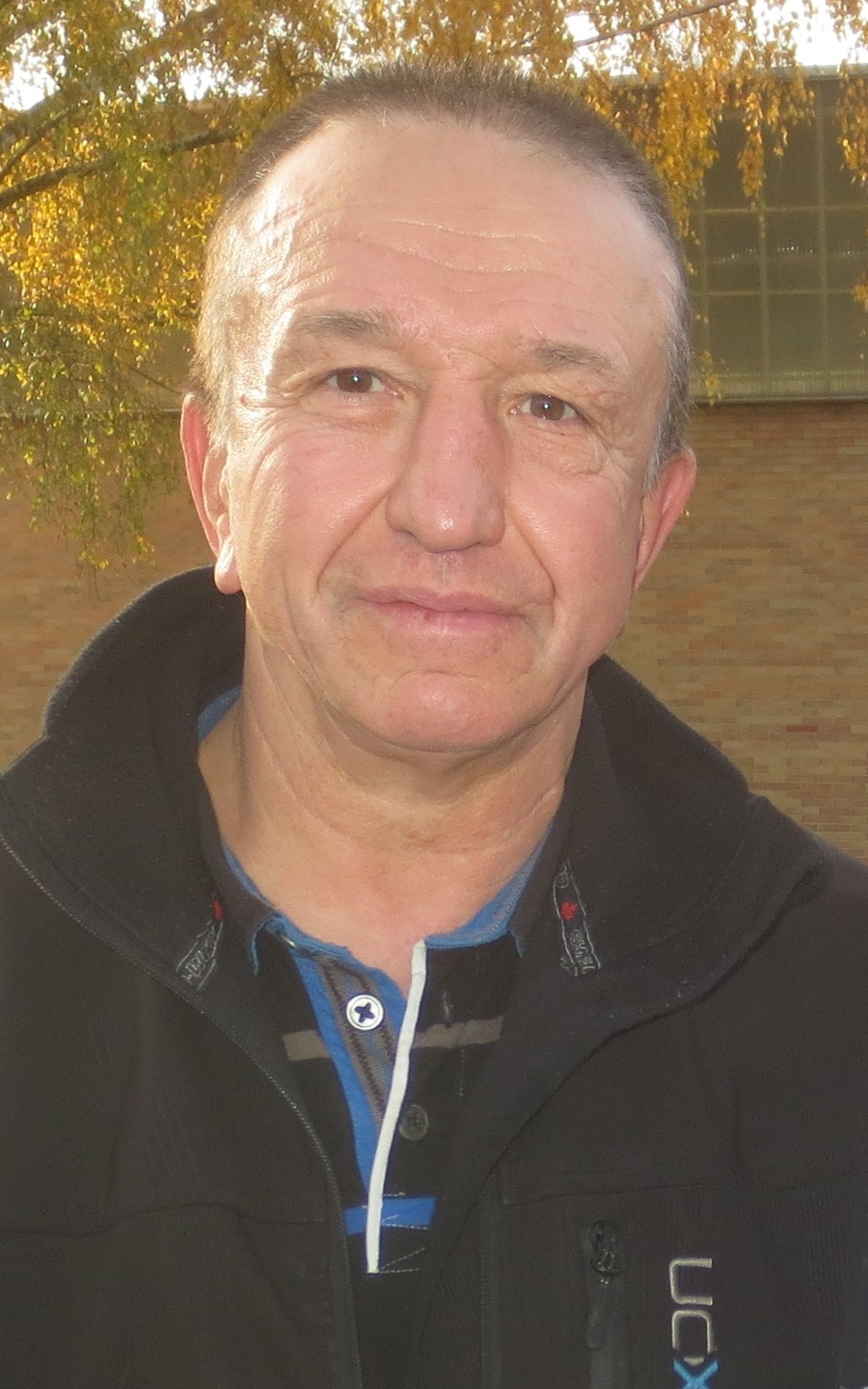
- Vladimir Kovin (2014)
- Born: June 20, 1954 (age 70); Nizhny Novgorod, Russian SFSR, Soviet Union
- Height: 6 ft 0 in (183 cm)
- Weight: 198 lb (90 kg; 14 st 2 lb)
- Position: Forward
- Shot: Left
- Played for: Torpedo Gorky; Hockey Club de Reims
- National team: Soviet Union
- Playing career: 1971–2015

Vladimir Kovin
Medal record

Men's ice hockey
Gold medal – first place	1984 Sarajevo	Team

Vladimir Aleksandrovich Kovin (born June 20, 1954 in Soviet Union), Владимир Александрович Ковин in Russian, is a retired ice hockey player who played in the Soviet Hockey League. He played for Torpedo (Gorky).

He competed for the Union of Soviet Socialist Republics in the 1984 Olympic Games where the Soviet team won the gold. He was inducted into the Russian and Soviet Hockey Hall of Fame in 1984.

== Career statistics ==
=== Regular season and playoffs ===
			Regular season					Playoffs
Season	Team	League	GP	G	A	Pts	PIM	GP	G	A	Pts	PIM
1971–72	Torpedo Gorky	USSR	1	0	0	0	0	—	—	—	—	—
1972–73	Torpedo Gorky	USSR	3	0	0	0	2	—	—	—	—	—
1973–74	Torpedo Gorky	USSR	8	1	0	1	8	—	—	—	—	—
1974–75	Torpedo Gorky	USSR	20	3	3	6	22	—	—	—	—	—
1975–76	Torpedo Gorky	USSR	36	8	9	17	23	—	—	—	—	—
1976–77	Torpedo Gorky	USSR	34	14	11	25	31	—	—	—	—	—
1977–78	Torpedo Gorky	USSR	33	13	19	32	51	—	—	—	—	—
1978–79	Torpedo Gorky	USSR	42	23	12	35	71	—	—	—	—	—
1979–80	Torpedo Gorky	USSR	39	14	23	37	51	—	—	—	—	—
1980–81	Torpedo Gorky	USSR	44	16	11	27	54	—	—	—	—	—
1981–82	Torpedo Gorky	USSR	45	12	13	25	60	—	—	—	—	—
1982–83	Torpedo Gorky	USSR	46	11	6	17	65	—	—	—	—	—
1983–84	Torpedo Gorky	USSR	43	22	13	35	50	—	—	—	—	—
1984–85	Torpedo Gorky	USSR	37	14	9	23	26	—	—	—	—	—
1985–86	Torpedo Gorky	USSR	36	6	4	10	26	—	—	—	—	—
1986–87	Torpedo Gorky	USSR	38	8	6	14	14	—	—	—	—	—
1987–88	Torpedo Gorky	USSR	24	4	3	7	16	—	—	—	—	—
1988–89	Torpedo Gorky	USSR	7	2	0	2	0	—	—	—	—	—
1988–89	Hockey Club de Reims	FRA II	25	36	31	67	30	—	—	—	—	—
1989–90	Hockey Club de Reims	FRA	27	14	15	29	64	—	—	—	—	—
1990–91	Hockey Club de Reims	FRA	5	0	0	0	0	2	3	0	3	12
1991–92	Hockey Club de Reims	FRA	33	13	8	21	70	—	—	—	—	—
1992–93	Hockey Club de Reims	FRA	8	2	2	4	24	—	—	—	—	—
1993–94	Hockey Club de Reims	FRA II	7	1	9	10	0	—	—	—	—	—
1994–95	Hockey Club de Reims	FRA III	11	9	14	23	34	—	—	—	—	—
1998–99	Hockey Club de Reims	FRA	3	0	0	0	2	—	—	—	—	—
2003–04	Hockey Club de Reims	FRA III	11	4	7	11	49	—	—	—	—	—
2007–08	Hockey Club de Reims	FRA II	3	0	2	2	0	—	—	—	—	—
2014–15	Hockey Club de Reims	FRA II	1	0	0	0	2	—	—	—	—	—
USSR totals			536	171	142	313	570	—	—	—	—	—
FRA totals			76	29	25	54	160	2	3	0	3	12

=== International ===
Year	Team	Event	GP	G	A	Pts	PIM
1976	Soviet Union	CC	5	2	0	2	6
1984	Soviet Union	OG	7	5	3	8	2
1984	Soviet Union	CC	6	0	3	3	2
1985	Soviet Union	WC	2	0	0	0	0
Senior totals			20	7	6	13	10
