= Viktor Tyumenev =

Russian ice hockey player

- Born: June 1, 1957 Moscow, Russian SFSR, Soviet Union
- Died: August 2, 2018 (aged 61) Moscow, Russia
- Height: 6 ft 0 in (183 cm)
- Weight: 190 lb (86 kg; 13 st 8 lb)
- Position: Left wing
- Shot: Left
- Played for: Krylya Sovetov Moscow; HC Spartak Moscow; TPS; KalPa; Kapfenberger SV; HC CSKA Moscow
- National team: Soviet Union
- NHL draft: 150th overall, 1987; Vancouver Canucks
- Playing career: 1975–1999

Medal record

Ice hockey

Representing Soviet Union

Olympic Games
Gold medal – first place	1984 Sarajevo	Ice hockey

World Championships
Gold medal – first place	1986 Soviet Union	Ice hockey
Gold medal – first place	1990 Switzerland	Ice hockey
Bronze medal – third place	1985 Czechoslovakia	Ice hockey

Viktor Nikolaevich Tyumenev (Russian: Виктор Николаевич Тюменев; June 1, 1957 — August 2, 2018) was a Russian ice hockey player who played in the Soviet Hockey League. He played for HC Spartak Moscow and Krylya Sovetov Moscow. He also played for the Soviet national team during the 1979 Challenge Cup against the NHL All-Stars. He was born in Moscow, Soviet Union.

He was inducted into the Russian and Soviet Hockey Hall of Fame in 1982.

== Career statistics ==
=== Regular season and playoffs ===
			Regular season					Playoffs
Season	Team	League	GP	G	A	Pts	PIM	GP	G	A	Pts	PIM
1975–76	Krylia Sovetov Moscow	USSR	2	0	0	0	0	—	—	—	—	—
1976–77	Krylia Sovetov Moscow	USSR	31	3	3	6	6	—	—	—	—	—
1977–78	Krylia Sovetov Moscow	USSR	31	4	7	11	17	—	—	—	—	—
1978–79	Krylia Sovetov Moscow	USSR	41	9	16	25	14	—	—	—	—	—
1979–80	Krylia Sovetov Moscow	USSR	44	11	8	19	59	—	—	—	—	—
1980–81	Spartak Moscow	USSR	45	13	16	29	30	—	—	—	—	—
1981–82	Spartak Moscow	USSR	47	21	29	50	64	—	—	—	—	—
1982–83	Spartak Moscow	USSR	43	16	26	42	42	—	—	—	—	—
1983–84	Spartak Moscow	USSR	44	18	15	33	36	—	—	—	—	—
1984–85	Spartak Moscow	USSR	38	8	12	20	34	—	—	—	—	—
1985–86	Spartak Moscow	USSR	39	12	12	24	24	—	—	—	—	—
1986–87	Spartak Moscow	USSR	37	10	10	20	28	—	—	—	—	—
1987–88	Spartak Moscow	USSR	36	7	13	20	20	—	—	—	—	—
1988–89	Spartak Moscow	USSR	36	3	15	18	14	—	—	—	—	—
1989–90	TPS	SM-l	44	8	22	30	20	9	1	7	8	4
1990–91	TPS	SM-l	42	10	32	42	16	9	1	3	4	8
1991–92	TPS	SM-l	29	2	9	11	12	—	—	—	—	—
1991–92	KalPa	SM-l	4	2	3	5	0	—	—	—	—	—
1991–92	KooKoo	FIN II	12	6	9	15	10	—	—	—	—	—
1992–93	SaPKo	FIN III	16	16	40	56	35	—	—	—	—	—
1992–93	SaPKo	FIN II	15	7	20	27	10	—	—	—	—	—
1993–94	Östersunds IK	SWE II	29	7	12	19	18	—	—	—	—	—
1994–95	Kapfenberger SV	AUT
1997–98	CSKA Moscow	RSL	5	0	0	0	2	—	—	—	—	—
1998–99	Krylia Sovetov Moscow	RSL	5	0	1	1	0	—	—	—	—	—
USSR totals			514	135	182	317	388	—	—	—	—	—
SM-l totals			119	22	66	88	48	18	4	8	12	12

=== International ===
Year	Team	Event	GP	G	A	Pts	PIM
1976	Soviet Union	EJC	4	3	1	4	8
1982	Soviet Union	WC	10	0	3	3	10
1984	Soviet Union	OG	7	0	9	9	2
1985	Soviet Union	WC	10	4	6	10	13
1986	Soviet Union	WC	6	0	0	0	0
1990	Soviet Union	WC	5	1	0	1	2
Senior totals			38	5	18	23	27
