= Nikolai Drozdetsky =

Russian ice hockey player

- Born: 14 June 1957 Kolpino, Russian SFSR, USSR
- Died: 25 November 1995 (aged 38) St. Petersburg, Russia
- Height: 185 cm (6 ft 1 in)
- Weight: 85 kg (187 lb; 13 st 5 lb)
- Position: Right Wing
- Shot: Left
- Played for: SKA Leningrad; HC CSKA Moscow; Borås HC
- National team: Soviet Union
- Playing career: 1974–1995
Medal record
Olympic Games
Gold medal – first place	1984 Sarajevo	Team
World Championships
Gold medal – first place	1981 Sweden	Team
Gold medal – first place	1982 Finland	Team
Bronze medal – third place	1985 Czechoslovakia	Team

Nikolai Vladimirovich Drozdetsky (Russian: Николай Владимирович Дроздецкий, 14 June 1957 – 25 November 1995) was a Russian ice hockey right winger. He played for SKA Leningrad in 1974–1979, then for HC CSKA Moscow from 1979 until part way through the 1986/87 season, when he played again for Leningrad, until 1989. He finished his career with Borås HC in Sweden, where he played in 1989–1995. He was named most valuable player of the Soviet elite league in 1984. He scored 252 goals in 503 league games and 64 goals in 109 international games with the Soviet national team.

Drozdetsky played on the Soviet national team in 1981, 1982, 1984, and 1985, which won the IIHF World Championships in 1981 and 1982, the Olympic gold medal in 1984, the 1981 Canada Cup, and the 1981, 1982, and 1985 European championships. He was the top goal scorer at the 1984 Olympics with ten goals in seven games, and also led the Soviet team with 12 points.

He died from complications of diabetes right after participating in a Seniors' hockey game.

== Career statistics ==
=== Regular season and playoffs ===
			Regular season					Playoffs
Season	Team	League	GP	G	A	Pts	PIM	GP	G	A	Pts	PIM
1974–75	SKA Leningrad	USSR	6	1	1	2	2	—	—	—	—	—
1975–76	SKA Leningrad	USSR	31	6	7	13	4	—	—	—	—	—
1976–77	SKA Leningrad	USSR	16	3	3	6	20	—	—	—	—	—
1977–78	SKA Leningrad	USSR	27	15	14	29	21	—	—	—	—	—
1978–79	SKA Leningrad	USSR	41	27	17	44	72	—	—	—	—	—
1979–80	CSKA Moscow	USSR	41	31	18	49	22	—	—	—	—	—
1980–81	CSKA Moscow	USSR	44	30	28	58	21	—	—	—	—	—
1981–82	CSKA Moscow	USSR	46	28	16	44	25	—	—	—	—	—
1982–83	CSKA Moscow	USSR	42	17	18	35	16	—	—	—	—	—
1983–84	CSKA Moscow	USSR	44	31	20	51	34	—	—	—	—	—
1984–85	CSKA Moscow	USSR	39	12	11	23	28	—	—	—	—	—
1985–86	CSKA Moscow	USSR	31	12	8	20	20	—	—	—	—	—
1986–87	CSKA Moscow	USSR	7	3	2	5	2	—	—	—	—	—
1986–87	SKA Leningrad	USSR	14	13	1	14	4	—	—	—	—	—
1987–88	SKA Leningrad	USSR	30	8	9	17	20	—	—	—	—	—
1988–89	SKA Leningrad	USSR	42	13	17	30	20	—	—	—	—	—
1989–90	Borås HC	SWE III	34	41	42	83	152	—	—	—	—	—
1990–91	Borås HC	SWE III	34	42	46	88	104	—	—	—	—	—
1991–92	Borås HC	SWE II	28	24	20	44	80	—	—	—	—	—
1992–93	Borås HC	SWE II	26	12	33	45	56	—	—	—	—	—
1993–94	Borås HC	SWE II	32	13	28	41	60	—	—	—	—	—
1994–95	Borås HC	SWE II	31	8	17	25	69	—	—	—	—	—
USSR totals			501	250	190	440	331	—	—	—	—	—
SWE II totals			117	57	98	155	265	—	—	—	—	—

=== International ===
Year	Team	Event	GP	G	A	Pts	PIM
1975	Soviet Union	EJC	5	3	0	3	4
1976	Soviet Union	WJC	—	0	2	2	—
1981	Soviet Union	WC	8	5	6	11	4
1981	Soviet Union	CC	7	2	2	4	2
1982	Soviet Union	WC	8	1	0	1	2
1984	Soviet Union	OG	7	10	2	12	2
1985	Soviet Union	WC	10	5	7	12	4
Senior totals			40	23	17	40	14

Preceded by Vladislav Tretiak	Soviet MVP; 1984	Succeeded by Sergei Makarov
