= 1955–56 Soviet League season =

- League: Soviet Championship League
- Sport: Ice hockey
- Matches: 315

1955-56
- Season champions: CSK MO Moscow

The 1955–56 Soviet Championship League season was the 10th season of the Soviet Championship League, the top level of ice hockey in the Soviet Union. Fifteen teams participated in the league, and CSK MO Moscow won the championship.

== Standings ==
	Club	GP	W	T	L	GF	GA	Pts
1.	CSK MO Moscow	28	28	0	0	217	29	56
2.	Krylya Sovetov Moscow	28	25	1	2	207	46	51
3.	Dynamo Moscow	28	23	0	5	132	36	46
4.	ODO Leningrad	28	20	2	6	128	82	42
5.	Avangard Chelyabinsk	28	15	2	11	90	63	32
6.	Daugava Riga	28	14	2	12	99	100	30
7.	Avangard Leningrad	28	12	3	13	112	84	27
8.	Spartak Moscow	28	12	3	13	71	104	27
9.	KKM Elektrostal	28	8	5	15	57	120	21
10.	Dynamo Novosibirsk	28	7	5	16	62	113	19
11.	Spartak Sverdlovsk	28	8	2	18	77	153	18
12.	Torpedo Gorky	28	7	2	19	75	127	16
13.	Khimik Voskresensk	28	6	4	18	48	109	16
14.	Lokomotiv Moscow	28	5	3	20	76	138	13
15.	Burevestnik Moscow	28	2	2	24	54	201	6
