= Army Derby =

Russian ice hockey rivalry

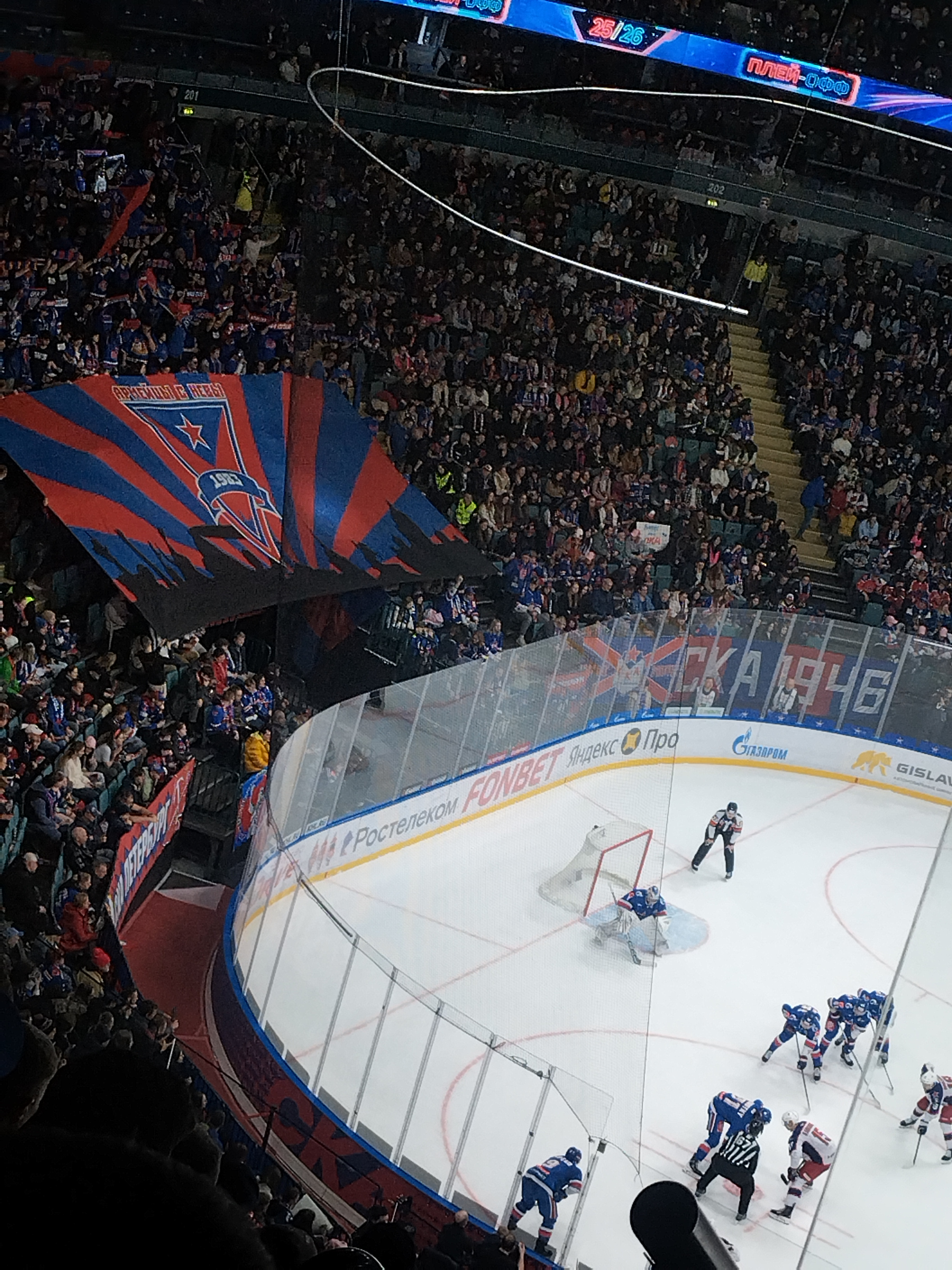
- SKA fans display a tifo during a faceoff in Game 3 of the 2026 Gagarin Cup first round series

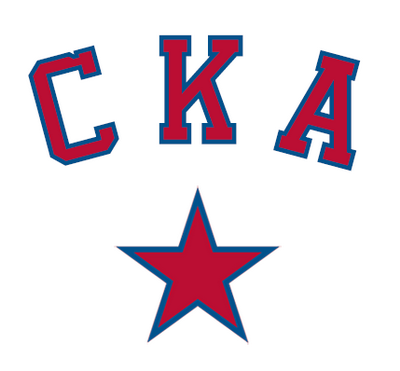
- CSKA Moscow SKA Saint Petersburg
- Sport: Ice hockey
- First meeting: January 6, 1947; CDKA 1-1 Leningrad House of Officers
- Latest meeting: September 29, 2026; CSKA 6-5 SKA; CSKA Arena; 2026-27 KHL season
- Next meeting: October 25, 2026; SKA Arena
- Stadiums: CSKA Arena; SKA Arena

Statistics
- Total meetings: 308 (KHL: 129)
- All-time series: CSKA leads 205-95-8 (KHL: SKA leads 67-62)
- Current win streak: CSKA W3

The Army Derby is the common name of the rivalry between the Russian ice hockey teams SKA Saint Petersburg and CSKA Moscow.

It is considered one of the biggest rivalries in the Kontinental Hockey League (KHL).

== Early years ==
CSKA and SKA were two of the first twelve Soviet ice hockey clubs that participated in the 1946–47 Soviet League season. CSKA was founded under the name of CDKA and SKA was founded under the name of the Leningrad House of Officers.

In the Soviet Championship League, both teams were run by the Sport Committee of the Soviet Armed Forces. CSKA was a perennial favorite of the league and won 32 championships in 45 seasons, while SKA was not a significant contender, with two bronze medals as their best results. Leningrad's team was considered a farm club for Moscow's team, and CSKA poached several promising players who were born and started playing in Leningrad but became stars in Moscow, including Nikolai Drozdetsky, Alexei Kasatonov, Alexei Gusarov and Evgeny Belosheikin. SKA managed a major upset against CSKA during the 1983–84 Soviet League season. The Moscow club won all 39 of their previous games and was aiming for a perfect season, but SKA defeated them 3-1 at V. I. Lenin Sport & Concert Complex.

After the dissolution of the Soviet Union, CSKA lost its status of the league favorite and was even briefly split into two clubs in the 2000s, while SKA's position did not improve. Neither club ever won a championship in the International Hockey League or the Russian Superleague.

== KHL ==
In the early period of the Kontinental Hockey League, SKA steadily improved and became the more successful of the two clubs, getting to the conference finals in 2012 and 2013. The 2011-12 KHL season was the first time the teams met in the playoffs, as SKA defeated CSKA 4-1 in the first round of the 2012 Gagarin Cup playoffs. They played again in the first round in 2014, and SKA won 4-0.

After the Russian national team's failure at the 2014 Olympics, SKA's sponsor Gazprom and CSKA's sponsor Rosneft increased funding of the clubs, which helped attract stars, such as Ilya Kovalchuk in SKA and Alexander Radulov in CSKA, and propel the teams to the top of Russian hockey. On the victorious Russian roster at the 2018 Olympics, all but two players represented SKA or CSKA. In the 2020-21 KHL season, the last before the introduction of a hard salary cap, SKA and CSKA were two of wealthiest teams in the KHL, with SKA's payroll including bonuses estimated to be 2.59 billion rubles to CSKA's 2.22 billion rubles.

In the 2014-15 KHL season, SKA and CSKA played in the Western Conference Finals for the first time. CSKA went 3-0 in the series, then SKA came back and won the series 4-3. It is, to date, the only reverse sweep in KHL history. Patrick Thoresen scored the series-winning goal in Game 7. After winning the Western Conference, SKA went on to win the Gagarin Cup.

After the reverse sweep, CSKA would face SKA in six more matchups in the Western Conference Finals in the following eight years, and win every single one of them. CSKA won the series 4-0 in 2016, 4-2 in 2018, 2021 and 2023 and 4-3 in 2019 and 2022. CSKA converted three of these victories (2018, 2022 and 2023) into Gagarin Cup championsips, while SKA won another Gagarin Cup in 2017. SKA's losing streak has been referred to as a curse by sportswriters.

Since the 2023-24 KHL season, the league changed the playoff format to allow interconference matchups before the final, which broke the streak of Army Derbies in the playoffs. At the same time, both teams entered a rebuilding period and their dominance in the league came to an end.

The teams played another playoff series in the first round of the 2026 Gagarin Cup playoffs. CSKA won the series 4-1, bringing their winning streak in the playoffs to seven series.

== Other teams ==
Games between the farm teams of the clubs, SKA-VMF against HC Zvezda Moscow in the All-Russian Hockey League and SKA-1946 against Krasnaya Armiya in the Youth Hockey League, have also been referred to as Army Derbies.
