= 1957–58 Soviet League season =

Soviet ice hockey season

The 1957–58 Soviet Championship League season was the 12th season of the Soviet Championship League, the top level of ice hockey in the Soviet Union. 16 teams participated in the league, and CSK MO Moscow won the championship for the fourth time in five years.

== First round ==
=== Group A ===
	Club	GP	W	T	L	GF	GA	Pts
1.	SKVO Leningrad	5	5	0	0	36	8	10
2.	Avangard Chelyabinsk	5	4	0	1	29	12	8
3.	Spartak Sverdlovsk	6	2	0	4	18	33	4
4.	Daugava Riga	6	0	0	6	14	44	0

=== Group B ===
	Club	GP	W	T	L	GF	GA	Pts
1.	Dynamo Moscow	5	5	0	0	19	5	10
2.	Torpedo Gorky	6	4	0	2	24	21	8
3.	Spartak Moscow	5	2	0	3	14	18	4
4.	Khimik Voskresensk	6	0	0	6	9	22	0

=== Group C ===
	Club	GP	W	T	L	GF	GA	Pts
1.	CSK MO Moscow	6	6	0	0	57	6	12
2.	Avangard Leningrad	6	3	1	2	19	33	7
3.	Elektrostal	6	2	1	3	14	25	5
4.	SK Sverdlova Molotov	6	0	0	6	6	32	0

=== Group D ===
	Club	GP	W	T	L	GF	GA	Pts
1.	Krylya Sovetov Moscow	4	3	1	0	28	9	7
2.	Lokomotiv Moscow	5	3	1	1	32	15	7
3.	Dynamo Novosibirsk	5	2	0	3	22	26	4
4.	SKVO Kalinin	6	1	0	5	12	44	2

== Final round ==
	Club	GP	W	T	L	GF	GA	Pts
1.	CSK MO Moscow	28	24	2	2	173	60	50
2.	Krylya Sovetov Moscow	28	24	1	3	168	74	49
3.	Dynamo Moscow	28	15	2	11	107	84	32
4.	Lokomotiv Moscow	28	11	5	12	102	101	27
5.	Avangard Leningrad	28	10	3	15	87	140	23
6.	Avangard Chelyabinsk	28	5	9	14	80	122	19
7.	SKVO Leningrad	28	4	4	20	66	117	12
8.	Torpedo Gorky	28	5	2	21	79	158	12

== Relegation ==
	Club	GP	W	T	L	GF	GA	Pts
1.	Spartak Moscow	28	22	1	5	128	55	45
2.	Khimik Voskresensk	28	20	2	6	100	56	42
3.	Spartak Sverdlovsk	28	13	4	11	89	56	30
4.	Elektrostal	28	13	3	12	106	99	29
5.	Dynamo Novosibirsk	28	14	0	14	100	98	28
6.	SKVO Kalinin	28	12	1	15	70	80	25
7.	SK Sverdlova Molotov	28	6	2	20	52	94	14
8.	Daugava Riga	28	5	1	22	61	135	11
