= 1962–63 Soviet League season =

Soviet ice hockey season

The 1962–63 Soviet Championship League season was the 17th season of the Soviet Championship League, the top level of ice hockey in the Soviet Union. 20 teams participated in the league, and CSKA Moscow won the championship.

== First round ==
	Club	GP	W	T	L	GF	GA	Pts
1.	CSKA Moscow	19	16	0	3	135	53	32
2.	Dynamo Moscow	19	14	2	3	100	39	30
3.	Spartak Moscow	19	14	2	3	93	53	30
4.	KS Elektrostal	19	12	3	4	78	54	27
5.	Khimik Voskresensk	19	12	2	5	77	47	26
6.	Lokomotiv Moscow	19	10	6	3	78	49	26
7.	Torpedo Gorky	19	9	6	4	67	60	24
8.	Krylya Sovetov Moscow	19	11	1	7	77	70	23
9.	SKA Leningrad	19	10	3	6	66	65	23
10.	SKA Kalinin	19	9	4	6	71	73	22
11.	Sibir Novosibirsk	19	9	2	8	73	70	20
12.	SK Uritskogo Kazan	19	6	1	12	57	89	13
13.	Aeroflot Omsk	19	6	0	13	58	74	12
14.	Metallurg Novokuznetsk	19	5	2	12	62	83	12
15.	SKA Kuibyshev	19	4	4	11	55	90	12
16.	Spartak Sverdlovsk	19	3	5	11	47	67	11
17.	Molot Perm	19	5	1	13	53	77	11
18.	Daugava Riga	19	4	2	13	46	98	10
19.	Traktor Chelyabinsk	19	3	3	13	55	93	9
20.	Spartak Leningrad	19	2	3	14	44	88	7

== Final round ==
	Club	GP	W	T	L	GF	GA	Pts
1.	CSKA Moscow	18	16	1	1	105	30	33
2.	Dynamo Moscow	18	12	1	5	77	48	25
3.	Spartak Moscow	18	11	1	6	77	49	23
4.	KS Elektrostal	18	9	4	5	50	42	22
5.	Khimik Voskresensk	18	8	5	5	59	52	21
6.	Lokomotiv Moscow	18	7	4	7	68	63	18
7.	Torpedo Gorky	18	7	2	9	59	70	16
8.	Krylya Sovetov Moscow	18	3	4	11	42	72	10
9.	SKA Leningrad	18	2	5	11	39	70	9
10.	SKA Kalinin	18	1	1	16	26	106	3

== Relegation round ==
	Club	GP	W	T	L	GF	GA	Pts
1.	Traktor Chelyabinsk	18	10	4	4	68	45	24
2.	Metallurg Novokuznetsk	18	10	3	5	87	62	23
3.	Molot Perm	18	9	3	6	53	47	21
4.	SKA Kuibyshev	18	9	3	6	64	63	21
5.	Spartak Sverdlovsk	18	7	4	7	66	54	18
6.	Aeroflot Omsk	18	7	3	8	61	69	17
7.	Sibir Novosibirsk	18	5	4	9	64	75	14
8.	Daugava Riga	18	7	0	11	62	74	14
9.	Spartak Leningrad	18	6	2	10	49	65	14
10.	SK Uritskogo Kazan	18	6	2	10	55	75	14
