= 1958–59 Soviet League season =

Soviet ice hockey season

The 1958–59 Soviet Championship League season was the 13th season of the Soviet Championship League, the top level of ice hockey in the Soviet Union. Twelve teams participated in the league, and CSK MO Moscow won the championship.

== Standings ==
	Club	GP	W	T	L	GF	GA	Pts
1.	CSK MO Moscow	27	20	4	3	163	49	44
2.	Dynamo Moscow	27	18	4	5	105	50	40
3.	Krylya Sovetov Moscow	27	18	4	5	107	63	40
4.	Lokomotiv Moscow	27	12	6	9	93	74	30
5.	Spartak Moscow	27	13	4	10	92	102	30
6.	SKVO Leningrad	27	7	6	14	62	95	20
7.	Khimik Voskresensk	27	8	4	15	59	93	20
8.	Traktor Chelyabinsk	27	8	3	16	78	122	19
9.	Torpedo Gorky	27	6	2	19	66	119	14
10.	Kirovez Leningrad	27	5	3	19	60	118	13
