= 1959–60 Soviet League season =

Soviet ice hockey season

The 1959–60 Soviet Championship League season was the 14th season of the Soviet Championship League, the top level of ice hockey in the Soviet Union. Eighteen teams participated in the league, and CSKA Moscow won the championship.

== First round ==
=== Group A ===
GR	Club	GP	W	T	L	GF	GA	Pts
1.	CSKA Moscow	25	19	1	5	109	66	39
2.	Krylya Sovetov Moscow	25	14	3	8	111	87	31
3.	Dynamo Moscow	25	13	1	11	91	76	27
4.	Lokomotiv Moscow	25	12	2	11	78	78	26
5.	Khimik Voskresensk	25	8	2	15	73	99	18
6.	Spartak Moscow	25	3	3	19	56	112	9

=== Group B ===
GR	Club	GP	W	T	L	GF	GA	Pts
1.	Elektrostal	25	16	5	4	127	67	37
2.	SKA Leningrad	25	16	4	5	95	52	36
3.	Kirovez Leningrad	25	13	6	6	118	62	32
4.	SKA Kalinin	25	13	4	8	102	72	30
5.	LIISchT Leningrad	25	6	2	17	77	140	14
6.	RVR Riga	25	0	1	24	43	169	1

=== Group C ===
GR	Club	GP	W	T	L	GF	GA	Pts
1.	Torpedo Gorky	30	22	5	3	153	74	49
2.	Traktor Chelyabinsk	30	19	7	4	114	65	45
3.	Dynamo Novosibirsk	30	14	3	13	111	100	31
4.	Spartak Sverdlovsk	30	12	2	16	104	119	26
5.	Molot Perm	30	5	5	20	72	130	15
6.	Spartak Omsk	30	4	6	20	72	138	14

== Playoffs ==
First round:

- CSKA Moscow – Kirovez Leningrad 3:3, 5:1, 7:3
- Krylya Sovetov Moscow – Spartak Sverdlovsk 5:2, 12:5
- Dynamo Moscow – Dynamo Novosibirsk 4:4, 6:2, 6:1
- Lokomotiv Moscow – HK Kalinin 4:3, 4:2

Quarterfinals:

- CSKA Moscow – Torpedo Gorky 5:6, 3:1, 8:0
- Krylya Sovetov Moscow – SKA Leningrad 9;2, 6:2
- Dynamo Moscow – Elektrostal 4:2, 4:0
- Lokomotiv Moscow – Traktor Chelyabinsk 2:3, 4:1, 9:2

Semifinals:

- CSKA Moscow – Krylya Sovetov Moscow 7:1, 5:0
- Dynamo Moscow – Lokomotive Moscow 5:1, 1:3, 5:3

Final:

- CSKA Moscow – Dynamo Moscow 10:4, 5:0, 5:1

== Placing round ==
Placing round games:

- Elektrostal – Traktor Chelyabinsk 5:2, 6:4
- Torpedo Gorky – SKA Leningrad 5:2, 2:3
- Dynamo Novosibirsk – SKA Kalinin 3:1, 2:1
- Kirovez Leningrad – Spartak Sverdlovsk 3:1, 0:5, 4:2

3rd place:

- Krylya Sovetov Moscow – Lokomotiv Moscow 7:3, 8:4

5th place

- Torpedo Gorky – Elektrostal 9:0, 5:1

7th place:

- SKA Leningrad – Traktor Chelyabinsk 6:3, 2:1

9th place:

- Dynamo Novosibirsk – Kirovez Leningrad

11th place:

- Spartak Sverdlovsk – SKA Kalinin 8:5, 1:2

13th-15th place:

	Club	GP	W	T	L	GF	GA	Pts
13.	Khimik Voskresensk	4	3	0	1	23	1	6
14.	Molot Perm	4	2	0	2	5	14	4
15.	LIISchT Leningrad	4	1	0	3	7	20	2

16th-18th place:

	Club	GP	W	T	L	GF	GA	Pts
16.	Spartak Omsk	4	3	0	1	19	8	6
17.	Spartak Moscow	4	2	0	2	18	8	4
18.	RVR Riga	4	1	0	3	10	31	2
