= Nikolay Makarov =

Nikolay or Nikolai Makarov may refer to:

- Nikolay Makarov (firearms designer) (1914–1988), Soviet firearms designer
- Nikolai Georgievich Makarov (born 1955), Russian mathematician
- Nikolay Mikhaylovich Makarov (born 1948), Soviet ice hockey player
- Nikolay Makarov (general) (born 1949), Russian general and Chief of the General Staff
