= 1949–50 Soviet League season =

Soviet ice hockey season

The 1949–50 Soviet Championship League season was the fourth season of the Soviet Championship League, the top level of ice hockey in the Soviet Union. 12 teams participated in the league, and CDKA Moscow won the championship.

== Standings ==
	Club	GP	W	T	L	GF	GA	Pts
1.	CDKA Moscow	22	19	1	2	122	32	39
2.	Dynamo Moscow	22	16	3	3	83	40	35
3.	Krylya Sovetov Moscow	22	16	2	4	93	37	34
4.	VVS Moscow	22	16	1	5	131	54	33
5.	Spartak Moscow	22	11	3	8	80	56	25
6.	Daugava Riga	22	10	3	9	84	72	23
7.	Bolshevik Leningrad	22	8	1	13	64	88	17
8.	Dynamo Sverdlovsk	22	7	1	14	47	86	15
9.	Dünamo Tallinn	22	6	2	14	36	98	14
10.	Dzerzhinets Chelyabinsk	22	4	4	14	47	95	12
11.	Dynamo Leningrad	22	4	2	16	65	117	10
12.	Lokomotiv Moscow	22	2	3	17	39	116	7
