= 1961–62 Soviet League season =

Soviet ice hockey season

The 1961–62 Soviet Championship League season was the 16th season of the Soviet Championship League, the top level of ice hockey in the Soviet Union. Twenty teams participated in the league, and Spartak Moscow won the championship.

== Standings ==
	Club	GP	W	T	L	GF	GA	Pts
1.	Spartak Moscow	38	31	3	4	193	91	65
2.	Dynamo Moscow	38	31	2	5	200	72	64
3.	CSKA Moscow	38	30	3	5	240	105	63
4.	Lokomotiv Moscow	38	27	3	8	190	92	57
5.	Krylya Sovetov Moscow	38	27	3	8	193	99	57
6.	Torpedo Gorky	38	26	3	9	184	98	55
7.	Khimik Voskresensk	38	22	5	11	149	78	49
8.	Traktor Chelyabinsk	38	18	5	15	136	138	41
9.	SKA Leningrad	38	17	6	15	123	121	40
10.	SKA Kalinin	38	13	7	18	110	126	33
11.	Molot Perm	38	13	3	22	121	145	29
12.	Dynamo Novosibirsk	38	12	5	21	131	160	29
13.	Metallurg Novokuznetsk	38	12	5	21	116	160	29
14.	Elektrostal	38	12	5	21	108	165	29
15.	Daugava Riga	38	12	4	22	112	163	28
16.	Spartak Sverdlovsk	38	11	4	23	74	133	26
17.	SKA Kuibyshev	38	7	7	24	76	196	21
18.	Spartak Omsk	38	8	3	27	85	191	19
19.	Kirovez Leningrad	38	5	4	29	89	182	14
20.	LIISchT Leningrad	38	4	4	30	85	200	12
