= 1960–61 Soviet League season =

Soviet ice hockey season

The 1960–61 Soviet Championship League season was the 15th season of the Soviet Championship League, the top level of ice hockey in the Soviet Union. Nineteen teams participated in the league, and CSKA Moscow won the championship.

== First round ==
=== Group A ===
	Club	GP	W	T	L	GF	GA	Pts
1.	Krylya Sovetov Moscow	18	13	4	1	98	39	30
2.	Spartak Moscow	18	13	1	4	102	58	27
3.	Torpedo Gorky	18	13	1	4	72	41	27
4.	Dynamo Moscow	18	12	2	4	89	32	26
5.	Traktor Chelyabinsk	18	9	1	8	66	55	19
6.	Molot Perm	18	8	0	10	58	78	16
7.	Dynamo Novosibirsk	18	5	2	11	46	71	12
8.	Spartak Sverdlovsk	18	4	2	12	61	85	10
9.	Metallurg Novokuznetsk	18	3	1	14	49	111	7
10.	Spartak Omsk	18	3	0	15	37	108	6

=== Group B ===
	Club	GP	W	T	L	GF	GA	Pts
1.	Lokomotiv Moscow	16	13	1	2	74	36	27
2.	CSKA Moscow	16	11	1	4	94	27	23
3.	Khimik Voskresensk	16	10	2	4	59	33	22
4.	Elektrostal	16	9	1	6	75	57	19
5.	SKA Leningrad	16	6	3	7	45	52	15
6.	SKA Kalinin	16	5	3	8	45	69	13
7.	Kirovez Leningrad	16	6	0	10	41	58	12
8.	LIISchT Leningrad	16	5	2	9	38	72	12
9.	Daugava Riga	16	0	1	15	30	97	1

== Final round ==
	Club	GP	W	T	L	GF	GA	Pts
1.	CSKA Moscow	15	11	0	4	68	30	22
2.	Torpedo Gorky	15	7	2	6	44	63	16
3.	Lokomotiv Moscow	15	7	1	7	42	46	15
4.	Krylya Sovetov Moscow	15	7	0	8	48	45	14
5.	Khimik Voskresensk	15	7	0	8	42	41	14
6.	HK Spartak Moscow	15	4	1	10	39	58	9

== 7th-12th place ==
	Club	GP	W	T	L	GF	GA	Pts
7.	Dynamo Moscow	15	12	2	1	73	25	26
8.	Elektrostal	15	7	2	6	66	58	16
9.	SKA Leningrad	15	6	3	6	54	60	15
10.	Traktor Chelyabinsk	15	7	0	8	52	46	14
11.	SKA Kalinin	15	4	2	9	42	68	10
12.	Molot Perm	15	4	1	10	40	70	9

== 13th-19th place ==
	Club	GP	W	T	L	GF	GA	Pts
13.	Dynamo Novosibirsk	18	8	8	2	64	45	24
14.	Kirovez Leningrad	18	9	3	6	57	44	21
15.	Spartak Sverdlovsk	18	9	2	7	73	60	20
16.	Spartak Omsk	18	8	3	7	56	67	19
17.	LIISchT Leningrad	18	7	4	7	66	57	18
18.	Metallurg Novokuznetsk	18	7	3	8	69	73	17
19.	Daugava Riga	18	2	3	13	46	84	7
