= 1966–67 Soviet League season =

Soviet ice hockey season

The 1966–67 Soviet Championship League season was the 21st season of the Soviet Championship League, the top level of ice hockey in the Soviet Union. 12 teams participated in the league, and Spartak Moscow won the championship.

== Standings ==
	Club	GP	W	T	L	GF	GA	Pts
1.	Spartak Moscow	44	38	3	3	303	97	79
2.	CSKA Moscow	44	35	4	5	283	120	74
3.	Dynamo Moscow	44	26	4	14	184	127	56
4.	SKA Leningrad	44	22	9	13	159	140	53
5.	Krylya Sovetov Moscow	44	23	4	17	164	142	50
6.	Khimik Voskresensk	44	16	9	19	128	158	41
7.	Lokomotiv Moscow	44	16	8	20	153	158	40
8.	Torpedo Gorky	44	16	6	22	116	158	38
9.	Dynamo Kiev	44	11	8	25	122	207	30
10.	Sibir Novosibirsk	44	11	7	26	143	221	29
11.	Metallurg Novokuznetsk	44	8	4	32	101	210	20
12.	Torpedo Minsk	44	7	4	33	106	218	18
