= 1965–66 Soviet League season =

Sports season

The 1965–66 Soviet Championship League season was the 20th season of the Soviet Championship League, the top level of ice hockey in the Soviet Union. 10 teams participated in the league, and CSKA Moscow won the championship.

== Standings ==
	Club	GP	W	T	L	GF	GA	Pts
1.	CSKA Moscow	36	32	2	2	239	70	66
2.	Spartak Moscow	36	24	4	8	173	99	52
3.	Dynamo Moscow	36	20	3	13	133	94	43
4.	Khimik Voskresensk	36	15	6	15	86	100	36
5.	Lokomotiv Moscow	36	16	4	16	114	135	36
6.	Krylya Sovetov Moscow	36	13	8	15	128	143	34
7.	Torpedo Gorky	36	14	3	19	84	114	31
8.	SKA Leningrad	36	10	7	19	86	118	27
9.	Dynamo Kiev	36	8	3	25	76	144	19
10.	Sibir Novosibirsk	36	5	6	25	78	166	16
