= HC CSKA Moscow =

Russian ice hockey team in Moscow (founded 1946)

CSKA Moscow
- City: Moscow, Russia
- League: KHL; 2008–present: RSL 1997–2008; Vysshaya Liga 1996–1997; IHL 1992–1996; Soviet League Class A 1946–1992
- Conference: Western
- Division: Tarasov
- Founded: 22 December 1946; 79 years ago as CDKA
- Home arena: CSKA Arena (capacity: 12,100)
- Colours
- Owner: Rosneft
- General manager: Denis Denisov
- Head coach: Igor Nikitin
- Captain: Pavel Karnaukhov
- Affiliates: Zvezda Moscow (VHL); Krasnaya Armiya (MHL)
- Website: cska-hockey.ru
Home colours	Away colours

Franchise history
- HC CSKA Moscow 1960–present CSK MO 1955–1959; CDSA 1952–1954; CDKA 1946–1951

HC CSKA Moscow (Russian: ЦСКА Москва, Центральный Спортивный Клуб Армии, Central Sports Club of the Army, Moscow) is a professional ice hockey club based in Moscow, Russia. It is a member of the Tarasov Division in the Kontinental Hockey League (KHL). It is a part of CSKA Moscow sports club. The team is referred to in the West as "Central Red Army" or the "Red Army Team" for its affiliation with the Soviet Army, known as the Red Army until 1946, and the Russian Armed Forces. CSKA won more Soviet championships and European cups than any other team in history. It is owned by Russia's largest oil company, Rosneft, which is in turn majority-owned by the Russian government.

In addition to nine division titles and record six Continental Cups, CSKA has reached the Gagarin Cup Finals six times, winning in 2019, 2022 and 2023. The club also became the first one to win both the Continental Cup and the Gagarin Cup in the same season.

In 2018, after more than 50 seasons at the old Ice Palace, the team moved to a new arena, which is now called CSKA Arena, their present home arena in Moscow.

== History ==
The club was founded in 1946 as CDKA (Centralnyy Dom Krasnoy Armii – Central House of the Red Army, referring to the Army community centre in Moscow). It was known as CDSA (with Red Army changed to Soviet Army) from 1952 – 1954, as CSK MO (Central Sports Club of the Ministry of Defense) from 1955 – 1959, and acquired its current name in 1960.

=== As a hockey powerhouse ===
CSKA won 32 Soviet regular season championships during the Soviet League's 46-year existence, far and away the most in the league's history; no other team won more than five. This included all but six from 1955 to 1989 and 13 in a row from 1977 to 1989. By comparison, no NHL no team has won more than five Stanley Cups in a row since the NHL took de facto control of the trophy in 1926, and no team has had the best regular season record in any format more than seven years in a row.

CSKA was just as dominant in the European Cup. They won all but two titles from 1969 to 1990, including 13 in a row from 1978 to 1990. The team's first coach was Anatoli Tarasov, who would later become famous as the coach of the Soviet national team. Tarasov coached the Red Army Team, either alone or with co-coaches, for most of the time from 1946 to 1975. The team's greatest run came under Viktor Tikhonov, who was coach from 1977 to 1996—serving for most of that time as coach of the national team.

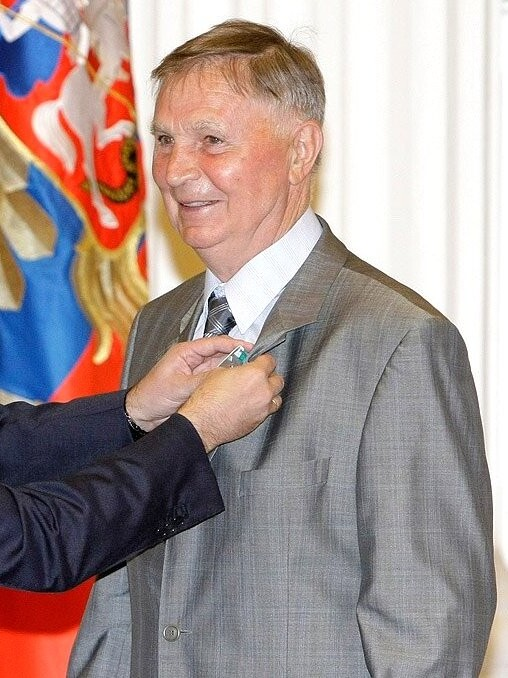
Viktor Tikhonov (2008), who was the Head Coach of the team for 22 years in total

The Red Army Team was able to pull off such a long run of dominance because during the Soviet era, the entire CSKA organization was a functioning division of the Soviet Armed Forces via the Ministry of Defence. As all able-bodied Soviet males had to serve in the military, the team was able to literally draft the best young hockey players in the Soviet Union onto the team. All players were commissioned officers in the Soviet Army. There was a substantial overlap between the rosters of the Red Army Team and the Soviet national team, which was one factor behind the Soviets' near-absolute dominance of international hockey from the 1950s through the early 1990s. By the late 1980s, however, the long run of Red Army dominance caused a significant dropoff in attendance throughout the league.

One of the most feared lines in hockey history was the KLM Line of the 1980s. The name came from the last names of the three players, Vladimir Krutov, Igor Larionov, and Sergei Makarov. Together with defensemen Viacheslav Fetisov and Alexei Kasatonov, they were known as the Green Unit because they wore green jerseys in practice. The five-man unit formed a dominant force in European hockey throughout the decade. All five players were later permitted to go to the NHL in 1989, with mixed results. Krutov had the shortest NHL career, lasting only one season in Vancouver; Makarov (who won the Calder Memorial Trophy in 1990) and Kasatonov were out of the NHL by 1997; Fetisov and Larionov won the Stanley Cup twice together with Detroit before Fetisov retired in 1998; Larionov would win a third Cup with Detroit in 2002, before retiring from New Jersey in 2004.

Not surprisingly, discipline was quite strict, especially under Tikhonov. His players practiced for as many as 11 months a year, and were confined to training camp (an Army barracks) most of that time even if they were married. However, it became less restrictive after the collapse of the Soviet Union.

At the IIHF Centennial All-Star Team, out of 6 players selected 4 players once played at CSKA Moscow.

=== CSKA and the NHL ===
CSKA played 36 games against NHL teams from 1975 to 1991 and finished with a record of 26 wins, 8 losses, and 2 ties. 34 of these games were played in Super Series, including the tour of North America in 1975/1976. The Super Series also introduced eventual Hockey Hall of Fame goaltender Vladislav Tretiak of the CSKA squad to North American ice hockey fans. On New Year's Eve 1975, CSKA played the Montreal Canadiens, widely regarded as the league's finest team (and that year's eventual Stanley Cup winners). The game ended with a 3–3 draw, but was widely hailed as one of the greatest games ever played.

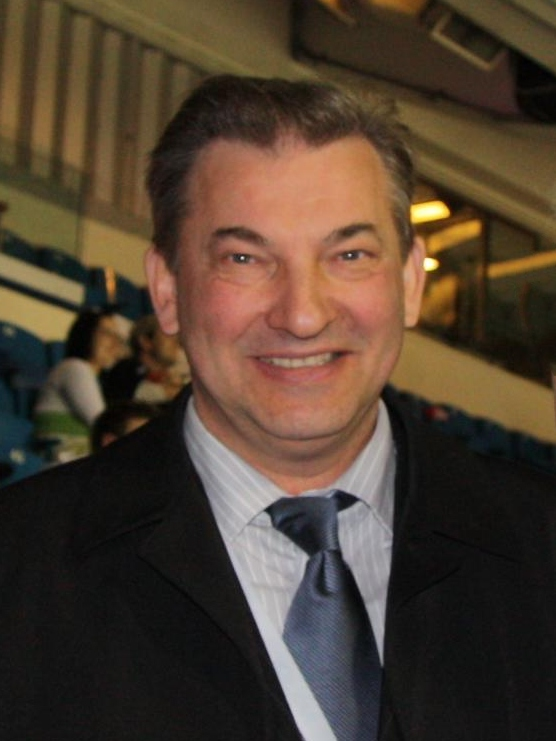
Vladislav Tretiak (2008), the goaltender of the IIHF Centennial All-Star Team

Another memorable game was played on 11 January 1976 against the Philadelphia Flyers, who at the time were the defending Stanley Cup Champions and were known as the "Broad Street Bullies" for their highly physical play. The game was notable for an incident where, after a body check delivered by Philadelphia's Ed Van Impe, the CSKA's top player, Valeri Kharlamov (like Tretiak eventually a Hall of Famer), was left prone on the ice for a minute. CSKA coach Konstantin Loktev pulled his team off the ice in protest that no penalty was called. They were told by NHL president Clarence Campbell to return to the ice and finish the game, which was being broadcast to an international audience, or the Soviet Hockey Federation would not get paid the fee that they were entitled to. They eventually complied and lost the game 4–1.

CSKA Moscow alumni have made a large impact on the NHL. In the mid-1990s, Sergei Fedorov, Vladimir Konstantinov, and Vyacheslav Kozlov had established themselves as key members of the Detroit Red Wings when they were joined by Fetisov and Larionov, forming the Russian Five. These five players would play an integral role in the Wings' consecutive Stanley Cup championships in 1997 and 1998. Dmitri Mironov joined the 1998 squad, following Konstantinov's career-ending injury on 13 June 1997; since Konstantinov was kept on the roster despite his injury, the 1998 squad marks the largest contingent of CSKA veterans (six) to win the Stanley Cup.

Super Series game log: 26–8–2 (home: 2–0–0; road: 24–8–2)
Super Series '76: 2–1–1 (home: 0–0–0; road: 2–1–1)

Game	Opponent	Score	Record
1	@ New York Rangers	7–3	1–0–0
2	@ Montreal Canadiens	3–3	1–0–1
3	@ Boston Bruins	5–2	2–0–1
4	@ Philadelphia Flyers	1–4	2–1–1

Super Series '80: 3–2–0 (home: 0–0–0; road: 3–2–0)

Game	Opponent	Score	Record
5	@ New York Rangers	5–2	3–1–1
6	@ New York Islanders	3–2	4–1–1
7	@ Montreal Canadiens	2–4	4–2–1
8	@ Buffalo Sabres	1–6	4–3–1
9	@ Quebec Nordiques	6–4	5–3–1

Super Series '86: 5–1–0 (home: 0–0–0; road: 5–1–0)

Game	Opponent	Score	Record
10	@ Los Angeles Kings	5–2	6–3–1
11	@ Edmonton Oilers	6–3	7–3–1
12	@ Quebec Nordiques	1–5	7–4–1
13	@ Montreal Canadiens	6–1	8–4–1
14	@ St. Louis Blues	4–2	9–4–1
15	@ Minnesota North Stars	4–3	10–4–1

Super Series '89: 5–2–1 (home: 1–0–0; road: 4–2–1)

Game	Opponent	Score	Record
16	@ Quebec Nordiques	5–5	10–4–2
17	@ New York Islanders	3–2	11–4–2
18	@ Boston Bruins	5–4	12–4–2
19	@ New Jersey Devils	5–0	13–4–2
20	@ Pittsburgh Penguins	2–4	13–5–2
21	@ Hartford Whalers	6–3	14–5–2
22	@ Buffalo Sabres	5–6	14–6–2
23	Calgary Flames	2–1	15–6–2

Super Series '90: 5–1–0 (home: 1–0–0; road: 4–1–0)

Game	Opponent	Score	Record
24	@ Winnipeg Jets	1–4	15–7–2
25	@ Vancouver Canucks	6–0	16–7–2
26	@ Minnesota North Stars	4–2	17–7–2
27	@ Chicago Blackhawks	6–4	18–7–2
28	@ Philadelphia Flyers	5–4	19–7–2
29	Montreal Canadiens	3–2	20–7–2

Super Series '91: 6–1–0 (home: 0–0–0; road: 6–1–0)

Game	Opponent	Score	Record
30	@ Detroit Red Wings	5–2	21–7–2
31	@ New York Rangers	6–1	22–7–2
32	@ Chicago Blackhawks	4–2	23–7–2
33	@ Calgary Flames	6–4	24–7–2
34	@ Edmonton Oilers	2–4	24–8–2
35	@ Winnipeg Jets	6–4	25–8–2
36	@ Vancouver Canucks	4–3 (OT)	26–8–2

=== Post-Soviet history ===
During the late 80s and early 90s, CSKA's position significantly weakened. After a conflict with Tikhonov, CSKA major stars including Fetisov, Larionov, Krutov and Makarov left the team to make their careers in the NHL. During the 90s they were followed by younger talents like Mogilny, Bure, Fedorov and Samsonov.

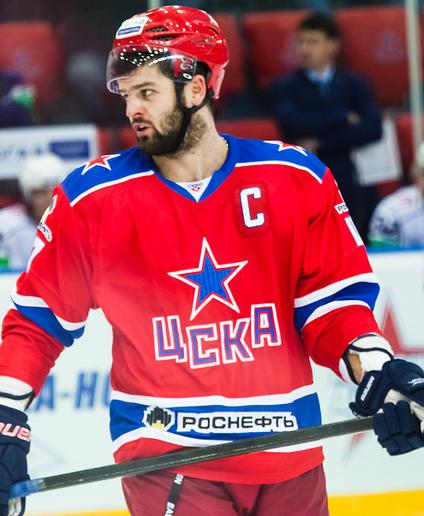
Alexander Radulov (2012)

CSKA Moscow played a series of exhibitions games, and an all-star game with the American Hockey Association as part of the 1992–93 season.

For a time in the late 1990s and early 2000s, it was briefly unofficially known as "the Russian Penguins" after the Pittsburgh Penguins bought an interest in the team. The Russian Penguins played 13 games in the International Hockey League as part of the 1993–94 IHL season.

In 1996 after a conflict with management of the club, Tikhonov created his own separate team called HC CSKA that spent two seasons in the Russian Superleague and eventually reunited with the original CSKA in 2002.

=== In the KHL ===
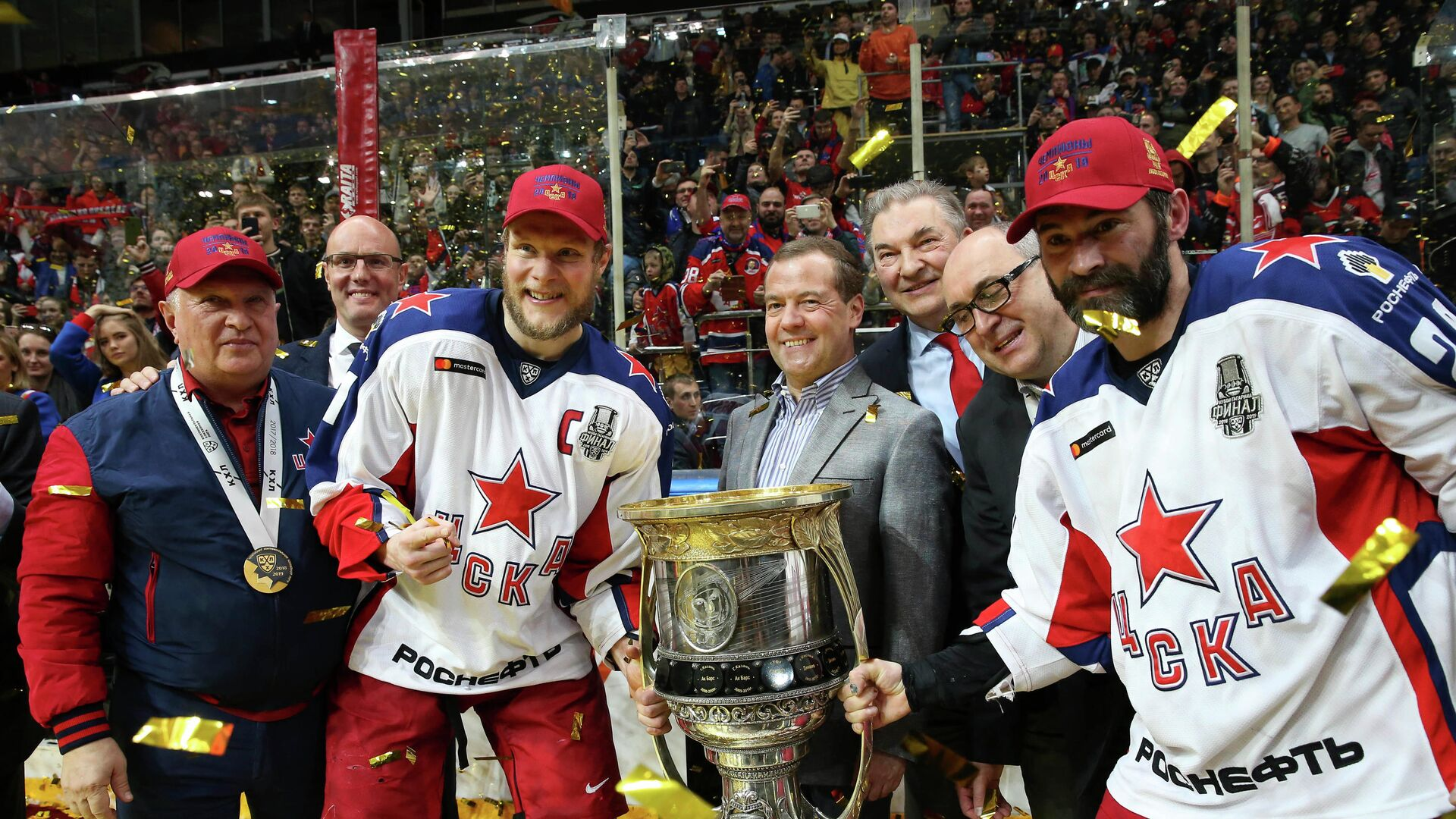
CSKA celebrating 2019 Gagarin Cup victory

Although CSKA has remained one of the strongest teams in Russia since the dissolution of the Soviet Union, it did not win a title in the KHL or its predecessors until 2015, when the club finished first in the regular season and became Russian champion for the first time in a long time, but failed to win the Gagarin Cup. From 2008 to 2015, the team did not advance past the conference semifinals of the Gagarin Cup playoffs; they missed the playoffs altogether in 2011. In the 2015–16 season, the team advanced all the way to the Gagarin Cup final; however, they lost that series to Metallurg Magnitogorsk in seven games. In the 2018–19 season, CSKA won its first Gagarin Cup, after beating Avangard Omsk in four games.

After the 2022 Russian invasion of Ukraine, Swedes Joakim Nordstrom and Lucas Wallmark elected to leave the team. Having lost the 2021 Gagarin Cup final to Avangard Omsk, CSKA returned to the final in 2022 to win its second Gagarin Cup against Metallurg Magnitogorsk. in 2023, CSKA went back to back, winning the Gagarin Cup in 7 games against Ak Bars Kazan.

CSKA has a major rivalry against SKA Saint Petersburg, referred to as the Army Derby.

== Logos ==
Logo during Soviet period

Previous logo

Current logo

== Honours ==
=== Domestic competitions ===
(gold) Soviet League Championship (32, record): 1947–48, 1948–49, 1949–50, 1954–55, 1955–56, 1957–58, 1958–59, 1959–60, 1960–61, 1962–63, 1963–64, 1964–65, 1965–66, 1967–68, 1969–70, 1970–71, 1971–72, 1972–73, 1974–75, 1976–77, 1977–78, 1978–79, 1979–80, 1980–81, 1981–82, 1982–83, 1983–84, 1984–85, 1985–86, 1986–87, 1987–88, 1988–89

(gold) USSR Cup (12, record): 1954, 1955, 1956, 1961, 1966, 1967, 1968, 1969, 1973, 1977, 1979, 1988

(gold) Vysshaya Liga Championship (1): 1996–97

(gold) Russian Championship (5): 2014–15, 2018–19, 2019–20, 2021–22, 2022–23

=== Kontinental Hockey League ===
(gold) Gagarin Cup (3, shared record): 2019, 2022, 2023

(gold) Continental Cup (6, record): 2014–15, 2015–16, 2016–17, 2018–19, 2019–20, 2020–21

(gold) Opening Cup (2): 2015–16, 2022–23

=== International ===
(gold) Intercontinental Cup (1): 1971–72

(gold) IIHF European Cup (20, record): 1969, 1970, 1971, 1972, 1973, 1974, 1976, 1978, 1979, 1980, 1981, 1982, 1983, 1984, 1985, 1986, 1987, 1988, 1989, 1990

(gold) Spengler Cup (1): 1991

(gold) Pajulahti Cup (1): 2005

=== Pre-season ===
(gold) Hockeyades (Vallée de Joux) (2): 2017, 2018

(gold) Moscow Mayor Cup (4): 2010, 2011, 2013, 2017

== Season-by-season KHL record ==
Note: GP = Games played; W = Wins; L = Losses; OTW = Overtime/shootout wins; OTL = Overtime/shootout losses; Pts = Points; GF = Goals for; GA = Goals against

Season	GP	W	OTW	L	OTL	Pts	GF	GA	Finish	Top scorer	Playoffs
2008–09	56	27	7	11	11	106	176	141	1st, Tarasov	Sergei Shirokov (40 points: 17 G, 23 A; 56 GP)	Lost in Quarterfinals, 0–3 (Dynamo Moscow)
2009–10	56	22	8	21	5	87	148	135	4th, Bobrov	Denis Parshin (43 points: 21 G, 22 A; 56 GP)	Lost in Conference Quarterfinals, 0–3 (HC MVD)
2010–11	54	13	7	28	6	59	136	159	5th, Bobrov	Jan Marek (40 points: 16 G, 24 A; 51 GP)	did not qualify
2011–12	54	19	3	25	7	70	119	129	4th, Bobrov	Sergei Shirokov (47 points: 18 G, 29 A; 53 GP)	Lost in Conference Quarterfinals, 1–4 (SKA Saint Petersburg)
2012–13	52	23	13	15	1	96	151	109	1st, Tarasov	Alexander Radulov (68 points: 22 G, 46 A; 48 GP)	Lost in Conference Semifinals, 1–4 (Dynamo Moscow)
2013–14	54	25	7	20	2	91	130	118	5th, Bobrov	Nikolai Prokhorkin (37 points: 19 G, 18 A; 52 GP)	Lost in Conference Quarterfinals, 0–4 (SKA Saint Petersburg)
2014–15	60	39	10	9	2	139	207	98	1st, Tarasov	Alexander Radulov (71 points: 24 G, 47 A; 46 GP)	Lost in Conference Finals, 3–4 (SKA Saint Petersburg)
2015–16	60	38	5	3	14	127	163	87	1st, Tarasov	Alexander Radulov (65 points: 23 G, 42 A; 53 GP)	Lost in Gagarin Cup Finals, 3–4 (Metallurg Magnitogorsk)
2016–17	60	41	3	8	8	137	183	110	1st, Tarasov	Kirill Petrov (37 points: 20 G, 17 A; 53 GP)	Lost in Conference Semifinals, 2–4 (Lokomotiv Yaroslavl)
2017–18	56	35	9	11	1	124	175	89	1st, Tarasov	Maxim Shalunov (40 points: 20 G, 20 A; 46 GP)	Lost in Gagarin Cup Finals, 1–4 (Ak Bars Kazan)
2018–19	62	43	10	9	0	106	191	75	1st, Tarasov	Mikhail Grigorenko (52 points: 17 G, 35 A; 55 GP)	Gagarin Cup Champions, 4–0 (Avangard Omsk)
2019–20	62	40	5	13	4	94	202	99	1st, Tarasov	Kirill Kaprizov (62 points: 33 G, 29 A; 57 GP)	Won in Conference Quarterfinals, 4–0 (Torpedo Nizhny Novgorod); Playoffs cancelled due to the COVID-19 pandemic
2020–21	60	34	9	12	5	91	182	121	1st, Tarasov	Konstantin Okulov (49 points: 18 G, 31 A; 54 GP)	Lost in Gagarin Cup Finals, 2–4 (Avangard Omsk)
2021–22	47	18	11	13	5	63	120	107	1st, Tarasov	Mikhail Grigorenko (33 points: 18 G, 15 A; 41 GP)	Gagarin Cup Champions, 4–3 (Metallurg Magnitogorsk)
2022–23	68	33	10	17	8	94	214	162	1st, Tarasov	Konstantin Okulov (54 points: 18 G, 36 A; 60 GP)	Gagarin Cup Champions, 4–3 (Ak Bars Kazan)
2023–24	68	30	4	26	8	76	193	166	4th, Tarasov	Konstantin Okulov (49 points: 15 G, 34 A; 57 GP)	Lost in Last 16, 1–4 (Lokomotiv Yaroslavl)
2024–25	68	30	8	21	9	85	194	170	4th, Tarasov	Maxim Sorkin (54 points: 24 G, 30 A; 68 GP)	Lost in Last 16, 2–4 (Dinamo Minsk)
2025–26	68	33	5	22	8	84	162	144	4th, Tarasov	Prokhor Poltapov (40 points: 16 G, 24 A; 68 GP)	Lost in Quarterfinals, 1–4 (Avangard Omsk)

== Head coaches ==
- (Soviet Union) Pavel Korotkov (1946–47)
- (Soviet Union) Anatoly Tarasov (1947 – 31 December 1960)
- (Soviet Union) Alexander Vinogradov (1 January 1961 – 31 May 1961)
- (Soviet Union) Yevgeny Babich (1 June 1961 – 22 November 1961)
- (Soviet Union) Anatoly Tarasov (22 November 1961 – 31 May 1970)
- (Soviet Union) Boris Kulagin (6 June 1970 – 17 November 1970)
- (Soviet Union) Anatoly Tarasov (17 November 1970 – 20 May 1974)
- (Soviet Union) Konstantin Loktev (20 May 1974 – 21 May 1977)
- (Soviet Union) / (Russia) Viktor Tikhonov (1 June 1977 – 19 April 1996)
- (Russia) Alexander Volchkov (19 April 1996 – 17 April 1998)
- (Russia) Boris Mikhailov (17 April 1998 – 24 January 2000)
- (Russia) Vladimir Krutov (24 January 2000 – 8 December 2001)
- (Russia) Irek Gimayev (8 December 2001 – 13 June 2002)
- (Russia) Vladimir Semenov (13 May 2002 – 1 August 2002)
- (Russia) Viktor Tikhonov (1 August 2002 – 28 April 2004)
- (Russia) Vyacheslav Bykov (28 April 2004 – 6 April 2009)
- (Russia) Sergei Nemchinov (26 May 2009 – 31 March 2011)
- (Slovakia) Július Šupler (31 March 2011 – 22 February 2012)
- (Russia) Vyacheslav Butsayev (22 February 2012 – 15 May 2012)
- (Russia) Valeri Bragin (15 May 2012 – 15 December 2012)
- (Russia) Vyacheslav Butsayev (17 December 2012 – 25 June 2013)
- (United States) John Torchetti (25 June 2013 – 17 April 2014)
- (Russia) Dmitri Kvartalnov (18 April 2014 – 23 March 2017)
- (Russia) / (Kazakhstan) Igor Nikitin (24 May 2017 – 14 July 2021)
- (Russia) Sergei Fedorov (14 July 2021 – 27 March 2024)
- (Russia) / (Germany) Ilya Vorobiev (27 March 2024 – 29 April 2025)
- (Russia) / (Kazakhstan) Igor Nikitin (17 June 2025 – present)

Until the fall of communism, all coaches held the rank of colonel in the Soviet Army.

== Players ==
=== Current roster ===
Updated 13 September 2026.

No.	Nat	Player	Pos	S/G	Age	Acquired	Birthplace
26	(United States)	Derek Barach	C	R	31	2026	Glenmont, New York, United States
72	(Russia)	Dmitri Buchelnikov	LW	R	23	2025	Nizhny Tagil, Russia
65	(Canada)	Alex Cotton	D	R	25	2026	Langley, British Columbia, Canada
19	(Belarus)	Ivan Drozdov	RW	L	26	2024	Vitebsk, Belarus
33	(Russia)	Dmitri Gamzin	G	L	23	2022	Moscow, Russia
34	(Russia)	Denis Guryanov	RW	L	29	2024	Togliatti, Russia
22	(Canada)	Rob Hamilton	D	L	32	2026	Calgary, Alberta, Canada
15	(Russia)	Pavel Karnaukhov (C)	LW	L	29	2016	Minsk, Belarus
61	(Russia)	Marat Khairullin	RW/C	L	30	2026	Volzhsk, Russia
10	(Russia)	Klim Kostin	RW	L	27	2026	Penza, Russia
51	(Russia)	Nikolai Kovalenko	RW	L	27	2025	Raleigh, North Carolina, United States
69	(Russia)	Oleg Maistrenko	C	R	21	2023	Moscow, Russia
98	(Russia)	Maxim Mamin	LW	L	31	2026	Moscow, Russia
89	(Russia)	Nikita Nesterov (A)	D	L	33	2021	Chelyabinsk, Russia
55	(Russia)	Nikita Okhotiuk	D	L	25	2024	Chelyabinsk, Russia
28	(Russia)	Ivan Patrikhayev	D	L	20	2024	Yekaterinburg, Russia
13	(Russia)	Prokhor Poltapov	RW	L	23	2020	St. Petersburg, Russia
95	(Russia)	Nazar Privalov	C	L	17	2026	Yaroslavl, Russia
79	(Canada)	Jérémy Roy	D	R	29	2025	Richelieu, Quebec, Canada
5	(Russia)	Dmitri Samorukov	D	L	27	2024	Volgograd, Russia
31	(Russia)	Alexander Samonov	G	L	31	2025	Moscow, Russia
27	(Russia)	Maxim Sorkin (A)	C	L	26	2019	Moscow, Russia
9	(Russia)	Egor Zamula	D	L	26	2026	Chelyabinsk, Russia
16	(Russia)	Denis Zernov	C	L	30	2025	Chelyabinsk, Russia

=== Retired numbers ===
CSKA have retired four numbers in their history:

CSKA Moscow retired numbers
No	Player	Position	Career	Last match date for CSKA
2	Viacheslav Fetisov	D	1978–89, 2009	11 December 2009
17	Valeri Kharlamov	LW	1967–81	9 July 1981
20	Vladislav Tretiak	G	1968–84	22 December 1984
24	Sergei Makarov	RW	1978–89	17 March 1989

=== Hall-of-Famers ===
Players

- Pavel Bure, LW, 1987–91, inducted 2012
- Sergei Fedorov, C, 1986–90, inducted 2015
- Viacheslav Fetisov, D, 1978–89, 2009; inducted 2001
- Valeri Kharlamov, LW, 1967–81, inducted 2005
- Igor Larionov, C, 1981–89, inducted 2008
- Sergei Makarov, RW, 1978–89, inducted 2016
- Vladislav Tretiak, G, 1968–84, inducted 1989
- Sergei Zubov, D, 1988–93, inducted 2019
- Alexander Mogilny, RW, 1986–89, inducted 2025

Builders

- Anatoli Tarasov, Coach, 1947–60, 1961–70, 1970–74; inducted 1974

=== IIHF Hall-of-Famers ===
Players

- Veniamin Alexandrov, LW, 1955–69, inducted 2007
- Helmuts Balderis, RW, 1977–80, inducted 1998
- Vsevolod Bobrov, LW, 1946–49, 1953–57; inducted 1997
- Pavel Bure, LW, 1987–91, inducted 2012
- Vyacheslav Bykov, C, 1982–90, inducted 2014
- Sergei Fedorov, C, 1986–90, inducted 2016
- Viacheslav Fetisov, D, 1978–89, 2009; inducted 2005
- Anatoli Firsov, LW, 1961–74, inducted 1998
- Valeri Kamensky, LW, 1985–91, inducted 2009
- Alexei Kasatonov, D, 1978–90, 1994–95, 1996–97 inducted 2009
- Valeri Kharlamov, LW, 1967–81, inducted 1998
- Andrei Khomutov, RW, 1979–90, inducted 2014
- Vladimir Krutov, LW, 1977–89, inducted 2010
- Viktor Kuzkin, D, 1958–76, inducted 2005
- Igor Larionov, C, 1981–89, inducted 2005
- Konstantin Loktev, RW, 1954–67, inducted 2007
- Sergei Makarov, RW, 1978–89, inducted 2001
- Boris Mikhailov, C, 1967–81, inducted 2000
- Vladimir Petrov, C, 1967–81, inducted 2006
- Alexander Ragulin, D, 1962–73, inducted 1997
- Nikolai Sologubov, D, 1949–64, inducted 2004
- Andrey Starovoytov, D, 1946–51, inducted 1997 (as a builder)
- Vladislav Tretiak, G, 1968–84, inducted 1998
- Alexei Yashkin, C, 1995–96, 2011–12, inducted 2020

Builders

- Anatoli Tarasov, Coach, 1947–60, 1961–70, 1970–74; inducted 1997
- Viktor Tikhonov, Coach, 1977–96, 2002–04; inducted 1998

=== Triple Gold Club ===
Players

- Viacheslav Fetisov, D, 1978–89, 2009; inducted 7 June 1997, Stanley Cup win vs. Philadelphia Flyers
- Alexei Gusarov, D, 1984–91, inducted 10 June 1996, Stanley Cup win vs. Florida Panthers
- Valeri Kamensky, LW, 1985–91, inducted 10 June 1996, Stanley Cup win vs. Florida Panthers
- Igor Larionov, C, 1981–89, inducted 7 June 1997, Stanley Cup win vs. Philadelphia Flyers
- Vladimir Malakhov, D, 1988–92, inducted 10 June 2000, Stanley Cup win vs. Dallas Stars
- Alexander Mogilny, RW, 1986–89, inducted 10 June 2000, Stanley Cup win vs. Dallas Stars
- Pavel Datsyuk, C, 2012–13, inducted 25 February 2018, Olympic gold win vs. Germany

=== First-round draft picks ===
- 2009: Mikhail Pashnin (1st overall)
- 2010: none
- 2011: Alexander Timirev (3rd overall), Mikhail Grigorenko (8th overall)
- 2012: Nikita Zadorov (4th overall), Vladislav Boiko (6th overall), Andrei Filonenko (18th overall), Sergei Tolchinsky (28th overall)
- 2013: Maxim Tretiak (12th overall), Ivan Nikolishin (29th overall)

=== List of CSKA players selected in the NHL Amateur Draft ===
- 1978: Viacheslav Fetisov (Montreal Canadiens) (201st overall)

=== List of CSKA players selected in the NHL entry draft ===
- 1982: Viktor Zhluktov (Minnesota North Stars) (143rd overall)
- 1983: Vladislav Tretiak (Montreal Canadiens) (138th overall), Viacheslav Fetisov (New Jersey Devils) (145th overall), Alexei Kasatonov (New Jersey Devils) (225th overall), Sergei Makarov (Calgary Flames) (231st overall)
- 1985: Igor Larionov (Vancouver Canucks) (214th overall)
- 1986: Vladimir Krutov (Vancouver Canucks) (238th overall)
- 1987: Igor Vyazmikin (Edmonton Oilers) (252nd overall)
- 1988: Alexander Mogilny (Buffalo Sabres) (89th overall), Valeri Kamensky (Quebec Nordiques) (129th overall)
- 1989: Sergei Fedorov (Detroit Red Wings) (74th overall), Pavel Bure (Vancouver Canucks) (113th overall), Sergei Starikov (New Jersey Devils) (152nd overall), Vyacheslav Bykov (Quebec Nordiques) (169th overall), Andrei Khomutov (Quebec Nordiques) (190th overall), Vladimir Konstantinov (Detroit Red Wings) (221st overall), Evgeny Davydov (Winnipeg Jets) (235th overall)
- 1990: Sergei Zubov (New York Rangers) (85th overall), Vyacheslav Butsayev (Philadelphia Flyers) (109th overall), Andrei Kovalenko (Quebec Nordiques) (148th overall)
- 1991: Igor Kravchuk (Chicago Blackhawks) (71st overall), Dmitri Motkov (Detroit Red Wings) (98th overall), Oleg Petrov (Montreal Canadiens) (127th overall), Evgeny Belosheikin (Edmonton Oilers) (232nd overall)
- 1992: Sergei Krivokrasov (Chicago Blackhawks) (12th overall), Boris Mironov (Winnipeg Jets) (27th overall), Dmitri Starostenko (New York Rangers) (120th overall), Artur Oktyabrev (Winnipeg Jets) (155th overall)
- 1993: Alexander Osadchy (San Jose Sharks) (80th overall), Yuri Yuresko (Detroit Red Wings) (178th overall), Dmitri Gorenko (Hartford Whalers) (214th overall)
- 1994: Alexander Kharlamov (Washington Capitals) (15th overall), Alexei Krivchenkov (Pittsburgh Penguins) (76th overall), Valentin Morozov (Pittsburgh Penguins) (154th overall), Alexei Lazarenko (New York Rangers) (182nd overall), Boris Zelenko (Pittsburgh Penguins) (206th overall)
- 1995: Oleg Belov (Pittsburgh Penguins) (102nd overall), Vasili Turkovsky (Washington Capitals) (199th overall)
- 1996: Andrei Petrunin (Hartford Whalers) (61st overall), Oleg Kvasha (Florida Panthers) (65th overall), Dmitri Subbotin (New York Rangers) (76th overall), Nikolai Ignatov (Tampa Bay Lightning) (152nd overall), Denis Khloptonov (Florida Panthers) (209th overall), Denis Khloptonov (Florida Panthers) (209th overall)
- 1997: Denis Timofeyev (Boston Bruins) (135th overall), Denis Martynyuk (Vancouver Canucks) (135th overall)
- 1998: Alexander Zevakhin (Pittsburgh Penguins) (54th overall)
- 1999: Alexander Buturlin (Montreal Canadiens) (39th overall), Alexander Chagodayev (Mighty Ducks of Anaheim) (105th overall), Vladimir Kulkov (Toronto Maple Leafs) (211th overall), Maxim Orlov (Washington Capitals) (219th overall), Dimitri Kirilenko Calgary Flames (252nd overall)
- 2000: Anton Volchenkov (Ottawa Senators) (21st overall), Vasily Bizyayev (Buffalo Sabres) (213th overall)
- 2002: Sergei Anshakov (Los Angeles Kings) (50th overall), Vladislav Evseev (Boston Bruins) (56th overall), Dmitri Kazionov (Tampa Bay Lightning) (100th overall), Viktor Bobrov (Calgary Flames) (146th overall), Sergei Mozyakin (Columbus Blue Jackets) (263rd overall)
- 2003: Nikolay Zherdev (Columbus Blue Jackets) (fourth overall), Andrei Kostitsyn (Montreal Canadiens) (10th overall), Dmitri Kosmachev (Columbus Blue Jackets) (71st overall), Rustam Sidikov (Nashville Predators) (133rd overall), Andrei Mukhachev (Nashville Predators) (210th overall)
- 2004: Kirill Lyamin (Ottawa Senators) (58th overall), Denis Parshin (Colorado Avalanche) (72nd overall), Alexander Nikulin (Ottawa Senators) (122nd overall)
- 2005: Viktor Dovgan (Washington Capitals) (209th overall), Nikolay Lemtyugov (St. Louis Blues) (219th overall)
- 2006: Vladimir Zharkov (New Jersey Devils) (77th overall), Sergei Shirokov (Vancouver Canucks) (163rd overall), Arturs Kulda (Atlanta Thrashers) (200th overall)
- 2007: Maxim Goncharov (Phoenix Coyotes) (123rd overall), Ilya Kablukov (Vancouver Canucks) (146th overall)
- 2008: Nikita Filatov (Columbus Blue Jackets) (sixth overall), Dmitri Kugryshev (Washington Capitals) (58th overall)
- 2011: Nikita Kucherov (Tampa Bay Lightning) (58th overall), Alexei Marchenko (Detroit Red Wings) (205th overall)
- 2012: Nikolai Prokhorkin (Los Angeles Kings) (121st overall), Nikita Gusev (Tampa Bay Lightning) (202nd overall)
- 2016: Maxim Mamin (Florida Panthers) (175th overall)
- 2017: Andrei Svetlakov (Minnesota Wild) (178th overall)
- 2018: Alexander Romanov (Montreal Canadiens) (38th overall)

=== Stanley Cup Winners ===
Players

- Sergei Brylin, C, 1991–93, won 1995, 2000, 2003
- Sergei Fedorov, C, 1986–90, won 1997, 1998, 2002
- Vyacheslav Fetisov, D, 1978–89, 2009 won 1997, 1998
- Alexei Gusarov, D, 1984–91, won 1996
- Valeri Kamensky, LW, 1985–91, won 1996
- Nikolai Khabibulin, G, 1991–94, won 2004
- Vladimir Konstantinov, D, 1984–91, won 1997, 1998
- Vyacheslav Kozlov, RW, 1991–92, 2010–11, won 1997, 1998
- Nikita Kucherov, RW, 2009–12, won 2020, 2021
- Igor Larionov, C, 1981–89, won 1997, 1998, 2002
- Vladimir Malakhov, D, 1988–92, won 2000
- Alexander Mogilny, RW, 1986–89, won 2000
- Sergei Nemchinov, C, 1982–85, won 1994, 2000
- Valeri Nichushkin, RW, 2016–18, won 2022
- Valeri Zelepukin, LW, 1987–89, won 1995
- Sergei Zubov, D, 1988–93, won 1994, 1999

Builders

- Vyacheslav Fetisov, assistant coach, 1978–89, 2009, won 2000

Note: Only counts if the players or builders have played for CSKA before the NHL.

=== Olympic Champions ===
Players

- Veniamin Aleksandrov, 1955–69, champion 1964, 1968
- Boris Alexandrov, 1973–79, champion 1976
- Sergei Andronov, C, 2009–12, 2014–present, champion 2018
- Vsevolod Bobrov, LW, 1946–49, 1953–57, champion 1956
- Vyacheslav Butsayev, C, 1989–92, 1992–93, 2004–05, champion 1992
- Vyacheslav Bykov, C, 1982–90, champion 1988
- Evgeny Davydov, LW, 1987–91, 1991–92 champion 1992
- Nikolay Drozdetsky, RW, 1979–87, champion 1984
- Vyacheslav Fetisov, D, 1978–89, 2009, champion 1984, 1988
- Anatoly Firsov, LW, 1961–74, champion 1964, 1968, 1972
- Aleksandr Gerasimov, RW, 1980–88, champion 1984
- Mikhail Grigorenko, C, 2017–20, 2021–present, champion 2018
- Alexei Gusarov, D, 1984–91, champion 1988
- Aleksandr Gusev, D, 1965, 1967–78, champion 1976
- Valeri Kamensky, LW, 1985–91, champion 1988
- Kirill Kaprizov, LW, 2017–20, champion 2018
- Sergei Kapustin, LW, 1977–80, champion 1976
- Aleksei Kasatonov, D 1978–90, 1996–97, champion 1984, 1988
- Valery Kharlamov, LW, 1967–81, champion 1972, 1976
- Andrei Khomutov, RW, 1980–90, champion 1984, 1988, 1992
- Bogdan Kiselevich, D, 2014–18, 2019–present, champion 2018
- Andrei Kovalenko, RW, 1988–93, champion 1992
- Igor Kravchuk, D, 1987–92, champion 1988, 1992
- Vladimir Krutov, LW, 1977–89, champion 1984, 1988
- Igor Larionov, C, 1981–89, champion 1984, 1988
- Vladimir Petrov, C, 1967–81, champion 1972, 1976
- Sergei Makarov, RW, 1978–89, champion 1984, 1988
- Vladimir Malakhov, D, 1988–92, champion 1992
- Alexey Marchenko, D, 2009–13, 2017–20, champion 2018
- Boris Mikhailov, C, 1967–81, champion 1972, 1976
- Nikita Nesterov, D, 2017–20, 2021–present, champion 2018
- Aleksandr Ragulin, D, 1962–73, champion 1968, 1972
- Ilya Sorokin, G, 2014–20, champion 2018
- Sergei Starikov, D, 1979–89, champion 1984, 1988
- Igor Stelnov, D, 1980–91, 1996–98 champion 1984, 1988
- Ivan Telegin, C, 2014–21, champion 2018
- Vladislav Tretiak, G, 1968–84, champion 1972, 1976, 1984
- Vladimir Vikulov, C, 1963–79, champion 1968, 1972
- Alexei Zhitnik, C, 1991–92, champion 1992
- Viktor Zhluktov, C, 1972–85, champion 1976

Builders

- Anatoly Tarasov, Coach, 1947–60, 1961–70, 1970–74, champion 1964, 1968, 1972
- Viktor Tikhonov, Coach, 1977–96, 2002–04, champion 1984, 1988, 1992
- Igor Nikitin, Coach, 2014–21, champion 2018

=== Canada Cup Winners ===
Players

- Sergei Babinov, D, 1977–86, won 1981
- Nikolay Drozdetsky, RW, 1979–87, won 1981
- Vyacheslav Fetisov, D, 1978–89, 2009, won 1981
- Irek Gimayev, D, 1979–87, won 1981
- Sergei Kapustin, LW, 1977–80, won 1981
- Aleksei Kasatonov, D 1978–90, 1996–97, won 1981
- Andrei Khomutov, RW, 1980–90, won 1981
- Vladimir Krutov, LW, 1977–89, won 1981
- Igor Larionov, C, 1981–89, won 1981
- Sergei Makarov, RW, 1978–89, won 1981
- Vladislav Tretiak, G, 1968–84, won 1981
- Viktor Zhluktov, C, 1972–85, won 1981
- Vladimir Zubkov, D, 1981–88, won 1981

Builders

- Viktor Tikhonov, Coach, 1977–96, 2002–04, won 1981

=== NHL Awards ===
Hart Trophy (NHL MVP)

- Sergei Fedorov, C, 1986–90, 1993–94

Lady Byng Memorial Trophy

- Alexander Mogilny, RW, 1986–89, 2002–03

Calder Memorial Trophy

- Pavel Bure, LW, 1987–91, 1991–92
- Sergei Makarov, RW, 1978–89, 1989–90
- Sergei Samsonov, LW, 1994–96, 1997–98
- Kirill Kaprizov, LW, 2017–20, 2020–21

Ted Lindsay Award

- Sergei Fedorov, C, 1986–90, 1993–94

Frank J. Selke Trophy

- Sergei Fedorov, C, 1986–90, 1993–94, 1995–96

NHL Plus-Minus Award

- Vladimir Konstantinov, D, 1984–91, 1995–96

Maurice "Rocket" Richard Trophy

- Pavel Bure, LW, 1987–91, 1999–00, 2000–01

Note: Only counts if the players or builders played in the CSKA before the NHL.

=== All-Star game ===
==== NHL All-Star Game ====
Players

- Pavel Bure, RW, 1987–91, 1994, 1995, 1997, 1998, 2000, 2001
- Valeri Bure, RW, 1990–91, 2000
- Sergei Fedorov, C, 1986–90, 1993, 1995, 1996, 2001, 2002, 2003
- Vyacheslav Fetisov, D, 1978–89, 2009, 1997, 1998
- Valeri Kamensky, LW, 1985–91, 1998
- Alexei Kasatonov, D, 1978–90, 1994–95, 1996–97, 1995
- Nikolai Khabibulin, G, 1991–94, 1998, 1999, 2002, 2003
- Igor Kravchuk, D, 1987–92, 1998
- Sergei Krivokrasov, RW, 1990–92, 2005–06, 1999
- Igor Larionov, C, 1981–89, 1998
- Dmitri Mironov, D, 1985–87, 1998
- Alexander Mogilny, RW, 1986–89, 1993, 1994, 1995, 1996
- Sergei Samsonov, LW, 1994–96, 2001
- Alexei Yashin, C, 1995–96, 2011–12, 1995, 1999, 2002
- Alexei Zhitnik, D, 1991–92, 1999
- Sergei Zubov, D, 1988–93, 1998, 2000

Note: Only counts if the players or builders has played in the CSKA before NHL.

==== KHL All-Star Game ====
Players

- Konstantin Barulin, G, 2008–10, 2009
- Pavel Datsyuk, C, 2012–13, 2013
- Denis Denisov, D, 1996–97, 2012–17, 2014
- Mikhail Grabovski, C, 2012–13, 2013
- Konstantin Korneyev, D, 2006–10, 2009, 2010
- Denis Parshin, LW, 2003–12, 2010
- Nikolai Prokhorkin, LW, 2010–12, 2012–15, 2014
- Alexander Radulov, RW, 2012–16, 2013, 2014
- Oleg Saprykin, LW, 2004–05, 2007–09, 2009
- Sergei Shirokov, RW, 2004–09, 2011–13, 2012

Builders

- Vyacheslav Bykov, assistant coach, 2004–09, 2009
- Igor Zakharkin, assistant coach, 2008–09, 2009

=== Franchise scoring leaders ===
These are the top-ten-point-scorers in franchise history. Figures are updated after each completed Soviet/CIS/IHL/RUS 2/RSL/KHL regular season.

Note: Pos = Position; GP = Games played; G = Goals; A = Assists; Pts = Points; P/G = Points per game

Points
Player	Pos	GP	G	A	Pts	P/G
Sergei Makarov	RW	472	303	375	678	1.43
Vladimir Petrov	C	496	346	319	665	1.34
Boris Mikhailov	LW	500	391	209	600	1.20
Valeri Kharlamov	LW	436	293	214	507	1.16
Vladimir Krutov	LW	438	288	215	503	1.14
Vyacheslav Fetisov	D	474	153	221	374	0.78
Viktor Zhluktov	C	456	198	168	366	0.80
Igor Larionov	C	334	165	196	361	1.08
Anatoli Firsov	LW	217	328	20	348	1.60
Andrei Khomutov	RW	330	197	147	344	1.04

Goals
Player	Pos	G
Boris Mikhailov	LW	391
Veniamin Alexandrov	LW	351
Vladimir Petrov	C	346
Anatoli Firsov	RW	328
Sergei Makarov	RW	303
Valeri Kharlamov	LW	293
Vladimir Krutov	LW	288
Vladimir Vikulov	C	279
Viktor Zhluktov	LW	198
Andrei Khomutov	RW	197

Assists
Player	Pos	A
Sergei Makarov	RW	375
Vladimir Petrov	C	319
Vyacheslav Fetisov	D	221
Vladimir Krutov	LW	215
Valeri Kharlamov	LW	214
Alexei Kasatonov	D	212
Boris Mikhailov	RW	209
Igor Larionov	C	196
Viktor Zhluktov	C	168
Alexander Radulov	RW	160

=== Awards and trophies ===
Soviet / Russian MVP

- Anatoli Firsov: 1967–68, 1968–69, 1970–71
- Valeri Kharlamov: 1971–72, 1972–73
- Vladislav Tretiak: 1973–74, 1974–75, 1975–76, 1976–77, 1980–81, 1982–83
- Boris Mikhailov: 1977–78, 1978–79
- Sergei Makarov: 1979–80, 1984–85, 1988–89
- Viacheslav Fetisov: 1981–82, 1985–86
- Vladimir Krutov: 1986–87
- Igor Larionov: 1987–88
- Andrei Khomutov: 1989–90
- Valeri Kamensky: 1990–91
- Oleg Belov: 1995–96

Scoring Champion

- Anatoli Firsov: 1965–66
- Victor Polupanov: 1966–67
- Vladimir Petrov: 1969–70, 1972–73, 1974–75, 1977–78, 1978–79
- Valeri Kharlamov: 1971–72
- Vyacheslav Anisin: 1973–74
- Sergei Makarov: 1979–80, 1980–81, 1981–82, 1983–84, 1984–85, 1985–86, 1986–87, 1987–88, 1988–89
- Sergei Mozyakin: 2005–06

Goal Scoring Champion

- Anatoly Tarasov: 1946–47
- Vsevolod Bobrov: 1947–48, 1950–51, 1951–52
- Victor Shuvalov: 1949–50
- Belyaev Bekyashev: 1953–54
- Vladimir Grebennikov: 1955–56
- Konstantin Loktev: 1958–59
- Yuri Paramoshkin: 1960–61
- Veniamin Alexandrov: 1962–63
- Alexander Almetov: 1963–64
- Anatoli Firsov: 1965–66
- Vladimir Petrov: 1969–70, 1972–73, 1978–79
- Boris Mikhailov: 1974–75, 1975–76, 1977–78
- Sergei Makarov: 1979–80, 1980–81, 1988–89
- Vladimir Krutov: 1983–84, 1985–86, 1986–87
- Andrei Khomutov: 1987–88
- Valentin Morozov: 1995–96

Soviet / Russian League First Team

- Nikolay Puchkov: 1957–58, 1958–59, 1961–62
- Ivan Tregubov: 1957–58
- Konstantin Loktev: 1957–58, 1964–65
- Nicholas Sologubov: 1958–59
- Henry Sidorenko: 1958–59
- Alexander Almetov: 1960–61, 1961–62, 1962–63
- Alexander Ragulin: 1962–63, 1963–64, 1965–66, 1966–67, 1967–68, 1968–69, 1971–72
- Eduard Ivanov: 1963–64, 1964–65
- Anatoly Firsov: 1963–64, 1965–66, 1966–67, 1967–68, 1968–69
- Victor Kuzkin: 1964–65, 1970–71
- Veniamin Alexandrov: 1965–66, 1967–68
- Boris Mikhailov: 1968–69, 1972–73, 1973–74, 1974–75, 1976–77, 1977–78
- Vladimir Vikulov: 1969–70, 1970–71, 1971–72
- Vladislav Tretiak: 1970–71, 1971–72, 1972–73, 1973–74, 1974–75, 1975–76, 1976–77, 1977–78, 1978–79, 1980–81, 1981–82, 1982–83, 1983–84
- Victor Lutchenko: 1970–71, 1971–72, 1972–73, 1973–74, 1974–75, 1975–76, 1976–77
- Valery Kharlamov: 1970–71, 1971–72, 1973–74, 1974–75, 1975–76, 1977–78
- Vladimir Petrov: 1972–73, 1974–75, 1976–77
- Vyacheslav Fetisov: 1977–78, 1981–82, 1983–84, 1984–85, 1985–86, 1986–87, 1987–88
- Sergei Makarov: 1978–79, 1980–81, 1981–82, 1982–83, 1983–84, 1984–85, 1985–86, 1986–87, 1987–88
- Alexei Kasatonov: 1980–81, 1981–82, 1982–83, 1983–84, 1984–85, 1985–86, 1986–87, 1987–88
- Vladimir Krutov: 1981–82, 1983–84, 1984–85, 1985–86, 1986–87, 1987–88
- Igor Larionov: 1982–83, 1985–86, 1986–87, 1987–88
- Nikolai Drozdetsky: 1983–84
- Evgeny Belosheikin: 1985–86, 1986–87
- Vladimir Konstantinov: 1989–90, 1990–91
- Andrei Khomutov: 1989–90, 1990–91
- Vyacheslav Bykov: 1989–90
- Vasily Kamensky: 1989–90
- Pavel Bure: 1990–91
- Sergei Mozyakin: 2005–06

Best Line

- Mikhailov – Petrov – Kharlamov: 1970–71, 1974–75, 1977–78,
- Vikulov – Firsov – Kharlamov: 1971–72
- Mikhailov – Kharlamov – Krutov: 1979–80
- Makarov – Zhluktov – Krutov: 1980–81
- Makarov – Larionov – Krutov: 1981–82, 1982–83, 1983–84, 1985–86, 1986–87, 1988–89
- Khomutov – Bykov – Kamensky: 1987–88, 1989–90
- Bure – Butsayev – Kamensky: 1990–91
- Petrov – Chibirev – Vostrikov: 1991–92

Best Rookie

- Pavel Bure: 1988–89
- Sergei Samsonov: 1995–96

== See also ==
- CSKA Moscow
- Hockey Hall of Fame
- IIHF Centennial All-Star Team
- IIHF Hall of Fame
- List of ice hockey line nicknames
- List of Scoring champions
- List of Soviet MVP
- Rendez-vous '87
- Russian and Soviet Hockey Hall of Fame
- Russian Five
- Soviet Championship League
- Super Series
- Super Series 1976
- Triple Gold Club
- 1976 Flyers–Red Army game
