= 1948–49 Soviet League season =

Soviet ice hockey season

The 1948–49 Soviet Championship League season was the third season of the Soviet Championship League, the top level of ice hockey in the Soviet Union. 10 teams participated in the league, and CDKA Moscow won the championship.

== Standings ==
	Club	GP	W	T	L	GF	GA	Pts
1.	CDKA Moscow	18	15	2	1	80	29	32
2.	VVS Moscow	18	12	3	3	78	34	27
3.	HC Dynamo Moscow	18	11	3	4	79	45	25
4.	Krylya Sovetov Moscow	18	10	3	5	62	40	23
5.	HC Spartak Moscow	18	9	3	6	67	54	21
6.	Dinamo Riga	18	8	3	7	55	53	19
7.	Dzerzhinets Chelyabinsk	18	5	4	9	45	58	14
8.	Dynamo Leningrad	18	3	3	12	48	69	9
9.	Dünamo Tallinn	18	2	3	13	23	79	7
10.	Dzerzhinets Leningrad	18	0	3	15	33	109	3
