= 1968–69 Soviet League season =

Soviet ice hockey season

The 1968–69 Soviet Championship League season was the 23rd season of the Soviet Championship League, the top level of ice hockey in the Soviet Union. 12 teams participated in the league, and Spartak Moscow won the championship.

== First round ==
	Club	GP	W	T	L	GF	GA	Pts
1.	CSKA Moscow	22	18	1	3	142	57	37
2.	Spartak Moscow	22	16	3	3	112	66	35
3.	Khimik Voskresensk	22	13	1	8	63	48	27
4.	Avtomobilist Sverdlovsk	22	11	3	8	93	70	25
5.	Dynamo Moscow	22	9	5	8	90	70	23
6.	Krylya Sovetov Moscow	22	10	3	9	82	83	23
7.	Lokomotiv Moscow	22	10	2	10	73	79	22
8.	SKA Leningrad	22	9	3	10	69	85	21
9.	Torpedo Gorky	22	9	2	11	63	74	20
10.	Dynamo Kiev	22	7	2	13	74	104	16
11.	Traktor Chelyabinsk	22	4	0	18	48	116	8
12.	Sibir Novosibirsk	22	2	3	17	46	103	7

== Final round ==
	Club	GP	W	T	L	GF	GA	Pts
1.	Spartak Moscow	30	23	2	5	150	91	48
2.	CSKA Moscow	30	22	1	7	171	79	45
3.	Dynamo Moscow	30	16	3	11	118	109	35
4.	Khimik Voskresensk	30	11	0	19	87	110	22
5.	Avtomobilist Sverdlovsk	30	9	2	19	99	144	20
6.	Krylya Sovetov Moscow	30	3	4	23	89	181	10
