= 1963–64 Soviet League season =

Soviet ice hockey season

The 1963–64 Soviet Championship League season was the 18th season of the Soviet Championship League, the top level of ice hockey in the Soviet Union. 10 teams participated in the league, and CSKA Moscow won the championship.

== Standings ==
	Club	GP	W	T	L	GF	GA	Pts
1.	CSKA Moscow	36	32	1	3	246	84	65
2.	Dynamo Moscow	36	25	1	10	152	96	51
3.	Spartak Moscow	36	24	2	10	165	107	50
4.	Lokomotiv Moscow	36	20	2	14	135	112	42
5.	Khimik Voskresensk	36	19	4	13	100	101	42
6.	Torpedo Gorky	36	13	3	20	101	128	29
7.	Krylya Sovetov Moscow	36	11	4	21	105	147	26
8.	SKA Leningrad	36	9	3	24	87	136	21
9.	Traktor Chelyabinsk	36	8	3	25	99	183	19
10.	Elektrostal	36	6	3	27	81	175	15
