= 1947–48 Soviet League season =

Soviet ice hockey season

The 1947–48 Soviet Championship League season was the second season of the Soviet Championship League, the top level of ice hockey in the Soviet Union. 10 teams participated in the league, and CDKA Moscow won the championship.

== Standings ==
	Club	GP	W	T	L	GF	GA	Pts
1.	CDKA Moscow	18	16	1	1	108	25	33
2.	HC Spartak Moscow	18	14	2	2	87	30	30
3.	HC Dynamo Moscow	18	11	4	3	91	37	26
4.	Dinamo Riga	18	11	2	5	81	48	24
5.	Dynamo Leningrad	18	7	3	8	64	64	17
6.	Krylya Sovetov Moscow	18	7	2	9	49	62	16
7.	VVS Moscow	18	5	5	8	43	56	15
8.	Dünamo Tallinn	18	4	1	13	34	90	9
9.	Dzerzhinets Leningrad	18	3	1	14	31	119	7
10.	Spartak Kaunas	18	0	3	15	29	86	3
