= Nazar Privalov =

Russian ice hockey player (born 2009)

- Born: 25 May 2009 (age 17) Yaroslavl, Russia
- Height: 6 ft 4 in (193 cm)
- Weight: 227 lb (103 kg; 16 st 3 lb)
- Position: Left wing
- Shoots: Left
- KHL team: CSKA Moscow
- NHL draft: Eligible 2027
- Playing career: 2026–present

Nazar Privalov (born 25 May 2009) is a Russian professional ice hockey player who is a left winger for HC CSKA Moscow in the Kontinental Hockey League (KHL). He is the top Russian prospect eligible for the 2027 NHL entry draft.

== Playing career ==
Privalov was the youngest player in JHL history to score two hat-tricks, breaking a record held for 15 years by Nikita Kucherov. As a 16-year-old as a CSKA Moscow prospect, Privalov had 17 goals in 17 games before completing the season posting 30 goals and 49 points through 51 appearances with Krasnaya Armiya.

Corey Pronman highlighted the difficulty for scouts in evaluating Privalov owing to Russian players being banned from IIHF competitions since the 2022 invasion of Ukraine.

== Personal life ==
Nazar has a younger sister, who is a basketball player in the CSKA system. He also has a younger brother.

== Career statistics ==
			Regular season					Playoffs
Season	Team	League	GP	G	A	Pts	PIM	GP	G	A	Pts	PIM
2025–26	Krasnaya Armiya	MHL	51	30	19	49	44	6	0	1	1	11
MHL totals			51	30	19	49	44	6	0	1	1	11
