= 1967–68 Soviet League season =

Soviet ice hockey season

The 1967–68 Soviet Championship League season was the 22nd season of the Soviet Championship League, the top level of ice hockey in the Soviet Union. 12 teams participated in the league, and CSKA Moscow won the championship.

== Standings ==
	Club	GP	W	T	L	GF	GA	Pts
1.	CSKA Moscow	44	39	4	1	278	90	82
2.	Spartak Moscow	44	34	1	9	243	113	69
3.	Dynamo Moscow	44	28	4	12	182	125	60
4.	Khimik Voskresensk	44	21	5	18	147	126	47
5.	SKA Leningrad	44	20	6	18	166	149	46
6.	Lokomotiv Moscow	44	21	4	19	149	151	46
7.	Torpedo Gorky	44	17	4	23	132	160	38
8.	Krylya Sovetov Moscow	44	16	6	22	139	173	38
9.	Dynamo Kiev	44	14	3	27	130	180	31
10.	Sibir Novosibirsk	44	12	5	27	111	197	29
11.	Avtomobilist Sverdlovsk	44	8	5	31	121	209	21
12.	Metallurg Novokuznetsk	44	7	7	30	96	221	21
