= 1964–65 Soviet League season =

Soviet ice hockey season

The 1964–65 Soviet Championship League season was the 19th season of the Soviet Championship League, the top level of ice hockey in the Soviet Union. 10 teams participated in the league, and CSKA Moscow won the championship.

== Standings ==
	Club	GP	W	T	L	GF	GA	Pts
1.	CSKA Moscow	36	33	2	1	218	59	68
2.	Spartak Moscow	36	24	5	7	151	95	53
3.	Khimik Voskresensk	36	18	8	10	110	85	44
4.	Dynamo Moscow	36	18	7	11	128	109	43
5.	SKA Leningrad	36	14	5	17	95	117	33
6.	Krylya Sovetov Moscow	36	14	4	18	107	119	32
7.	Lokomotiv Moscow	36	12	5	19	109	124	29
8.	Torpedo Gorky	36	10	5	21	92	128	25
9.	Metallurg Novokuznetsk	36	8	7	21	102	168	23
10.	Traktor Chelyabinsk	36	2	6	28	75	183	10
