= 1950–51 Soviet League season =

Soviet ice hockey season

The 1950–51 Soviet Championship League season was the fifth season of the Soviet Championship League the top level of ice hockey in the Soviet Union. 12 teams participated in the league, and VVS MVO Moscow won the championship.

== First round ==
=== Group A ===
	Club	GP	W	T	L	GF	GA	Pts
1.	HC Dynamo Moscow	5	5	0	0	32	6	10
2.	Krylya Sovetov Moscow	5	4	0	1	31	9	8
3.	ODO Leningrad	5	2	1	2	11	23	5
4.	HC Spartak Moscow	5	1	2	2	17	16	4
5.	Dzerzhinets Chelyabinsk	5	1	1	3	12	39	3
6.	HC Spartak Minsk	5	0	0	5	3	32	0

=== Group B ===
	Club	GP	W	T	L	GF	GA	Pts
1.	VVS Moscow	5	4	1	0	43	9	9
2.	CDKA Moscow	5	4	1	0	33	10	9
3.	Dynamo Leningrad	5	2	0	3	19	30	4
4.	Dünamo Tallinn	5	2	0	3	9	29	4
5.	Dynamo Sverdlovsk	5	1	1	3	18	32	3
6.	Daugava Riga	5	0	1	4	13	25	1

== Final round ==
	Club	GP	W	T	L	GF	GA	Pts
1.	VVS Moscow	10	9	1	0	74	18	19
2.	HC Dynamo Moscow	10	7	0	3	50	34	14
3.	Krylya Sovetov Moscow	10	6	1	3	41	23	13
4.	CDKA Moscow	10	5	0	5	36	33	10
5.	Dynamo Leningrad	10	2	0	8	30	47	4
6.	ODO Leningrad	10	0	0	10	13	88	0

== 7th-12th place ==
	Club	GP	W	T	L	GF	GA	Pts
1.	Dzerzhinets Chelyabinsk	5	2	3	0	22	12	7
2.	HC Spartak Moscow	5	3	1	1	22	15	7
3.	Dynamo Sverdlovsk	5	3	1	1	17	17	7
4.	Daugava Riga	5	2	1	2	17	17	5
5.	Dünamo Tallinn	5	2	0	3	23	20	4
6.	HC Spartak Minsk	5	0	0	5	7	27	0
