= Nikolay Puchkov =

- Born: October 23, 1944; Moscow, USSR
- Died: June 25, 2010 (aged 65); Moscow, Russia
- Education: Candidate of chemical sciences
- Occupations: International boxing referee, television journalist, sport commentator, boxing trainer

Nikolay Puchkov (May 23, 1944 – June 25, 2010) was a Soviet and Russian International boxing referee, commentator, boxing historian, and assistant director of the Institute of Physical Chemistry of the Russian Academy of Sciences.

== Biography ==
Nikolay Puchkov was born in Moscow on October 23, 1944. He trained in boxing for 12 years. In 1971 he became the champion of the regional tournament of the club "Zenit". He was a sparring partner of the two-time Olympic champ Boris Lagutin. In 1973 he has become a referee of a high category, and in 1986 an international referee of EABA. From 1983 he was the chairman of board of boxing judges. He was a boxing commentator on Eurosport and Russia 2. Analysis, opinions and predictions by Nikolay Puchkov were highly valuated by leading magazines and the boxing community. His erudition was not limited to boxing. He held a Candidate's degree in chemical sciences and worked as assistant director of the Institute of Physical Chemistry of the Russian Academy of Sciences. He loved poetry. The last bout for which he was referee happened in March 2010 at the Jubilee Viktor Ageev tournament in Balashikha, when Konstantin Piternov knocked out Benson Mwakyembe. Nikolay Puchkov died on June 25, 2010, in Moscow's Botkin Hospital, after liver cancer.

== Trivia ==
- Poem of boxing referee Vitali I. Samoilov dedicated to the 60-years Jubilee of Nikolay Puchkov.
- Nikolay Puchkov acted in one scene of the movie Shadow Boxing 2 (The Revenge)
