= 1969–70 Soviet League season =

Soviet ice hockey league season

The 1969–70 Soviet Championship League season was the 24th season of the Soviet Championship League, the top level of ice hockey in the Soviet Union. 12 teams participated in the league, and CSKA Moscow won the championship.

== Regular season ==
	Club	GP	W	T	L	GF	GA	Pts
1.	CSKA Moscow	44	39	1	4	321	121	79
2.	Spartak Moscow	44	33	3	8	263	159	69
3.	Khimik Voskresensk	44	30	6	8	215	119	66
4.	SKA Leningrad	44	22	7	15	184	139	51
5.	Dynamo Moscow	44	22	5	17	194	146	49
6.	Torpedo Gorky	44	22	1	21	187	168	45
7.	Traktor Chelyabinsk	44	17	2	25	168	230	36
8.	Krylya Sovetov Moscow	44	14	7	23	126	182	35
9.	Sibir Novosibirsk	44	16	3	25	160	239	35
10.	Lokomotiv Moscow	44	12	5	27	117	199	29
11.	Avtomobilist Sverdlovsk	44	9	2	33	169	255	20
12.	Dynamo Kiev	44	5	4	35	125	272	14

== Relegation ==
- Torpedo Minsk – Sibir Novosibirsk 4:8, 4:5
