= 1970–71 Soviet League season =

Ice hockey season

The 1970–71 Soviet Championship League season was the 25th season of the Soviet Championship League, the top level of ice hockey in the Soviet Union. Nine teams participated in the league, and CSKA Moscow won the championship.

== Standings ==
	Club	GP	W	T	L	GF	GA	Pts
1.	CSKA Moscow	40	32	1	7	243	95	65
2.	Dynamo Moscow	40	27	4	9	196	116	58
3.	SKA Leningrad	40	24	5	11	159	137	53
4.	Spartak Moscow	40	23	5	12	183	144	51
5.	Khimik Voskresensk	40	20	4	16	163	135	44
6.	Krylya Sovetov Moscow	40	16	4	20	125	163	36
7.	Torpedo Gorky	40	9	6	25	129	174	24
8.	Traktor Chelyabinsk	40	10	1	29	111	211	21
9.	Sibir Novosibirsk	40	2	4	34	99	243	8
