= 1972–73 Soviet League season =

Soviet ice hockey season

The 1972–73 Soviet Championship League season was the 27th season of the Soviet Championship League, the top level of ice hockey in the Soviet Union. Nine teams participated in the league, and CSKA Moscow won the championship.

== Regular season ==
	Club	GP	W	T	L	GF	GA	Pts
1.	CSKA Moscow	32	26	2	4	204	109	54
2.	Spartak Moscow	32	23	2	7	178	108	48
3.	Krylya Sovetov Moscow	32	18	4	10	137	106	40
4.	Dynamo Moscow	32	19	1	12	140	82	39
5.	Torpedo Gorky	32	12	4	16	119	129	28
6.	Khimik Voskresensk	32	13	1	18	111	122	27
7.	SKA Leningrad	32	9	4	19	101	155	22
8.	Traktor Chelyabinsk	32	9	2	21	114	184	20
9.	Avtomobilist Sverdlovsk	32	4	2	26	101	217	10

== Relegation ==
- Kristall Saratov – Traktor Chelyabinsk 2:3, 0:10
