= 1973–74 Soviet League season =

Soviet ice hockey season

The 1973–74 Soviet Championship League season was the 28th season of the Soviet Championship League, the top level of ice hockey in the Soviet Union. Nine teams participated in the league, and Krylya Sovetov Moscow won the championship.

== Regular season ==
	Club	GP	W	T	L	GF	GA	Pts
1.	Krylya Sovetov Moscow	32	24	3	5	162	87	51
2.	CSKA Moscow	32	18	4	10	153	121	40
3.	Dynamo Moscow	32	16	4	12	141	114	36
4.	Spartak Moscow	32	15	3	14	146	145	33
5.	Torpedo Gorky	32	11	6	15	111	127	28
6.	Dinamo Riga	32	13	2	17	120	130	28
7.	Khimik Voskresensk	32	11	5	16	107	125	27
8.	Traktor Chelyabinsk	32	11	4	17	115	151	26
9.	SKA Leningrad	32	7	5	20	100	155	19

== Relegation ==
- Avtomobilist Sverdlovsk – SKA Leningrad 4:7, 2:9
