= 1971–72 Soviet League season =

Soviet ice hockey season

The 1971–72 Soviet Championship League season was the 26th season of the Soviet Championship League, the top level of ice hockey in the Soviet Union. Nine teams participated in the league, and CSKA Moscow won the championship.

== Standings ==
	Club	GP	W	T	L	GF	GA	Pts
1.	CSKA Moscow	32	27	3	2	202	94	57
2.	Dynamo Moscow	32	20	4	8	127	95	44
3.	Spartak Moscow	32	17	2	13	140	123	36
4.	Krylya Sovetov Moscow	32	15	2	15	112	121	32
5.	Traktor Chelyabinsk	32	12	6	14	123	136	30
6.	SKA Leningrad	32	13	2	17	100	125	28
7.	Khimik Voskresensk	32	13	1	18	98	112	27
8.	Torpedo Gorky	32	9	5	18	108	127	23
9.	Lokomotiv Moscow	32	5	1	26	79	156	11
