= 1980–81 Soviet League season =

Soviet ice hockey season

The 1980–81 Soviet League Season was the 35th year of competition in the Soviet Championship League. CSKA Moscow won the championship, its 5th in a row and 24th overall.

== First round ==
R		GP	W	T	L	GF	GA	Pts
1	CSKA Moscow	44	36	5	3	268	98	77
2	Spartak Moscow	44	30	6	8	220	124	66
3	Dynamo Moscow	44	25	8	11	192	114	58
4	Traktor Chelyabinsk	44	21	5	18	167	148	47
5	Dynamo Riga	44	20	6	18	148	138	46
6	Sokil Kyiv	44	20	5	19	151	152	45
8.5
7	Krylya Sovetov	44	19	7	18	143	146	45
8	Torpedo Gorki	44	19	7	18	137	153	45
9	Khimik Voskresensk	44	18	2	24	154	169	38
10	SKA Saint Petersburg	44	15	4	25	122	205	34
11	Salavat Yulaev Ufa	44	6	3	35	110	226	15
12	Dinamo Minsk	44	3	6	35	89	228	12

== Final round ==
R		GP	W	T	L	GF	GA	Pts
1	CSKA Moscow	49	40	6	3	299	113	86
2	Spartak Moscow	49	32	6	11	240	141	70
3	Dynamo Moscow	49	27	8	14	215	134	62
4	Traktor Chelyabinsk	49	23	6	20	178	172	52
5	Dynamo Riga	49	22	6	21	163	157	50
6	Sokil Kyiv	49	22	5	22	167	173	49

== Relegation ==
R		GP	W	T	L	GF	GA	Pts
7	Torpedo Gorki	56	28	9	19	207	193	65
8	Khimik Voskresensk	56	27	2	27	218	207	56
9	Krylya Sovetov	56	24	7	25	203	203	55
10	SKA Saint Petersburg	56	25	5	26	201	229	55
8.5
11	Salavat Yulaev Ufa	56	11	7	38	170	269	29
12	Dinamo Minsk	56	10	7	39	148	267	27
