= 1979–80 Soviet League season =

Soviet ice hockey season

The 1979–80 Soviet League Season was the 34th year of competition in the Soviet Championship League, the highest level ice hockey league in the Soviet Union. CSKA Moscow won the championship, its 4th in a row and 23rd overall.

== Regular season ==
	Club	GP	W	T	L	GF	GA	Pts
1.	CSKA Moscow	44	39	2	3	306	118	80
2.	Dynamo Moscow	44	33	1	10	235	127	67
3.	Spartak Moscow	44	28	5	11	195	140	61
4.	Krylya Sovetov Moscow	44	22	5	17	172	149	49
5.	Torpedo Gorky	44	20	4	20	175	173	44
6.	Sokol Kiev	44	14	12	18	146	161	40
7.	Traktor Chelyabinsk	44	17	6	21	139	162	40
8.	Dinamo Riga	44	16	4	24	134	162	36
9.	Khimik Voskresensk	44	15	6	23	138	174	36
10.	Izhstal Izhevsk	44	9	8	27	143	229	26
11.	SKA Leningrad	44	10	6	28	128	233	26
12.	Avtomobilist Sverdlovsk	44	8	7	29	139	222	23

== Relegation ==
	Club	GP	W	T	L	GF	GA	Pts
1.	Salavat Yulaev Ufa	6	3	1	2	29	22	7
2.	SKA Leningrad	6	3	1	2	21	25	7
3.	Izhstal Izhevsk	6	3	0	3	29	30	6
4.	Kristall Saratov	6	2	0	4	26	28	4
