= 1974–75 Soviet League season =

Soviet ice hockey season

The 1974–75 Soviet Championship League season was the 29th season of the Soviet Championship League, the top level of ice hockey in the Soviet Union. Ten teams participated in the league, and CSKA Moscow won the championship.

== Regular season ==
	Club	GP	W	T	L	GF	GA	Pts
1.	CSKA Moscow	36	25	3	8	196	122	53
2.	Krylya Sovetov Moscow	36	21	3	12	185	134	45
3.	Spartak Moscow	36	19	6	11	157	144	44
4.	Khimik Voskresensk	36	16	9	11	119	120	41
5.	Dinamo Riga	36	15	9	12	152	143	39
6.	Dynamo Moscow	36	15	4	17	133	143	34
7.	Traktor Chelyabinsk	36	15	2	19	139	167	32
8.	Torpedo Gorky	36	12	4	20	142	169	28
9.	SKA Leningrad	36	10	4	22	116	152	24
10.	Kristall Saratov	36	6	8	22	112	157	20

== Relegation ==
- Avtomobilist Sverdlovsk – SKA Leningrad 0:2, 2:6
