= 1981–82 Soviet League season =

Soviet ice hockey season

The 1981–82 Soviet League Season was the 36th year of competition in the Soviet Championship League. CSKA Moscow won the championship, its 6th in a row and 25th overall.

== First round ==
R		GP	W	T	L	GF	GA	Pts
1	CSKA Moscow	44	38	2	4	252	87	78
2	Spartak Moscow	44	38	0	6	247	117	76
3	Dynamo Moscow	44	34	4	6	220	111	72
4	Torpedo Gorki	44	22	5	17	159	140	49
8.5
5	Sokil Kyiv	44	20	5	19	154	149	45
6.	Traktor Chelyabinsk	44	12	10	22	151	183	34
7	SKA Saint Petersburg	44	13	8	23	117	155	34
8	Dynamo Riga	44	13	5	26	147	181	31
8.5
9	Krylya Sovetov	44	13	4	27	140	215	30
10	Izhstal Izhevsk	44	11	8	25	134	196	30
11	Khimik Voskresensk	44	10	5	29	126	197	25
12	Kristall Saratov	44	11	2	31	131	247	24

== Final round ==
R		GP	W	T	L	GF	GA	Pts
1	CSKA Moscow	47	40	3	4	269	91	83
2	Spartak Moscow	47	39	0	8	257	135	78
3	Dynamo Moscow	47	36	5	6	233	117	77
4	Torpedo Gorki	47	22	5	20	164	157	49

== 5th-8th place ==
R		GP	W	T	L	GF	GA	Pts
5	Sokil Kyiv	56	29	5	22	215	192	63
6	Traktor Chelyabinsk	56	18	11	27	198	229	47
7	SKA Saint Petersburg	56	16	10	30	155	214	42
8	Dynamo Riga	56	17	6	33	202	234	40

== Relegation ==
R		GP	W	T	L	GF	GA	Pts
9	Izhstal Izhevsk	60	25	8	27	226	248	58
10	Krylya Sovetov	60	24	4	32	224	272	52
11	Khimik Voskresensk	60	22	7	31	195	230	51
8.5
12	Kristall Saratov	60	21	2	37	215	308	44
