= 1977–78 Soviet League season =

Soviet ice hockey season

The 1977–78 Soviet Championship League season was the 32nd season of the Soviet Championship League, the top level of ice hockey in the Soviet Union. 10 teams participated in the league, and CSKA Moscow won the championship.

== Regular season ==
	Club	GP	W	T	L	GF	GA	Pts
1.	CSKA Moscow	36	28	3	5	215	109	59
2.	Dynamo Moscow	36	21	4	11	161	104	46
3.	Krylya Sovetov Moscow	36	17	6	13	146	138	40
4.	Traktor Chelyabinsk	36	14	10	12	130	118	38
5.	Khimik Voskresensk	36	15	5	16	127	117	35
6.	Dinamo Riga	36	13	8	15	118	135	34
7.	Torpedo Gorky	36	14	4	18	138	164	32
8.	Spartak Moscow	36	14	4	18	123	141	32
9.	Avtomobilist Sverdlovsk	36	12	5	19	133	176	29
10.	SKA Leningrad	36	5	5	26	131	220	15

== Relegation ==
- SKA Leningrad – Sibir Novosibirsk 6:2, 6:3
