= 1975–76 Soviet League season =

Sports season

The 1975–76 Soviet Championship League season was the 30th season of the Soviet Championship League, the top level of ice hockey in the Soviet Union. 10 teams participated in the league, and Spartak Moscow won the championship.

== Regular season ==
	Club	GP	W	T	L	GF	GA	Pts
1.	Spartak Moscow	36	21	8	7	189	139	50
2.	CSKA Moscow	36	22	4	10	188	116	48
3.	Dynamo Moscow	36	21	3	12	163	119	45
4.	Krylya Sovetov Moscow	36	20	0	16	163	145	40
5.	Khimik Voskresensk	36	15	7	14	100	105	37
6.	Dinamo Riga	36	16	5	15	122	118	37
7.	Traktor Chelyabinsk	36	14	5	17	144	137	33
8.	Torpedo Gorky	36	12	5	29	129	151	29
9.	SKA Leningrad	36	8	5	23	119	183	21
10.	Sibir Novosibirsk	36	8	4	24	105	209	20

== Relegation Playoff (9th placed team versus Class A2 runner up) ==
- Dizel Penza – SKA Leningrad 3:6, 2:8
