= 1976–77 Soviet League season =

Soviet ice hockey season

The 1976–77 Soviet Championship League season was the 31st season of the Soviet Championship League, the top level of ice hockey in the Soviet Union. 10 teams participated in the league, and CSKA Moscow won the championship.

== Standings ==
	Club	GP	W	T	L	GF	GA	Pts
1.	CSKA Moscow	36	28	1	7	220	113	57
2.	Dynamo Moscow	36	22	6	8	175	104	50
3.	Traktor Chelyabinsk	36	20	5	11	128	106	45
4.	Dinamo Riga	36	17	7	12	133	126	41
5.	Khimik Voskresensk	36	14	9	13	115	103	37
6.	Spartak Moscow	36	14	9	13	154	162	37
7.	Krylya Sovetov Moscow	36	14	5	17	120	137	33
8.	Torpedo Gorky	36	11	9	16	108	137	31
9.	SKA Leningrad	36	10	0	26	128	183	20
10.	Kristall Saratov	36	4	1	31	85	195	9
