= 1978–79 Soviet League season =

Soviet ice hockey season

The 1978–79 Soviet Championship League season was the 33rd season of the Soviet Championship League, the top level of ice hockey in the Soviet Union. 12 teams participated in the league, and CSKA Moscow won the championship.

== Regular season ==
	Club	GP	W	T	L	GF	GA	Pts
1.	CSKA Moscow	44	35	2	7	277	131	72
2.	Dynamo Moscow	44	27	8	9	210	124	62
3.	Spartak Moscow	44	25	2	17	179	167	52
4.	Krylya Sovetov Moscow	44	20	7	17	166	151	47
5.	Torpedo Gorky	44	19	8	17	172	163	46
6.	Dinamo Riga	44	19	7	18	150	132	45
7.	Traktor Chelyabinsk	44	18	6	20	126	140	42
8.	Khimik Voskresensk	44	15	10	19	136	154	40
9.	Sokol Kiev	44	16	2	26	127	155	34
10.	Avtomobilist Sverdlovsk	44	13	7	24	151	219	33
11.	SKA Leningrad	44	11	7	26	150	232	29
12.	Salavat Yulaev Ufa	44	11	4	29	120	196	26

== Relegation ==
	Club	GP	W	T	L	GF	GA	Pts
1.	SKA Leningrad	6	3	2	1	40	25	8
2.	Avtomobilist Sverdlovsk	6	3	2	1	31	22	8
3.	Kristall Saratov	6	3	1	2	25	26	7
4.	Sibir Novosibirsk	6	0	1	5	23	46	1
