= HK Lokomotiv Moscow =

HK Lokomotiv Moscow ХК Локомотив Москва
- City: Moscow
- League: Soviet; Vysshaya Liga; Pervaya Liga
- Founded: 1947
- Folded: 1983
- Home arena: Sokolniki Ice Palace (capacity: 5,530)
- Colours

Franchise history
- Xоккейный клуб Локомотив Москва (Hockey Club Lokomotiv Moscow)

HK Lokomotiv Moscow was an ice hockey team in Moscow, Russia (then Soviet Union). They played in the Soviet Championship League, and various other lower-level Soviet leagues from 1947 to 1983.

== History ==
The club was founded in 1947 as part of the Lokomotiv Moscow sports club. In their first season, they took part in the Klass B, the second level of Soviet hockey. In 1949, the club won the Klass B and was promoted to the Klass A, the top level of Soviet hockey.

Under the guidance of coach Alexander Novokreschtschenov the team in its premiere season finished in twelfth place, and were relegated to the Klass B. In the 1960–61 season, they finished in third place in the Klass A, the best finish in their history. In 1970, the club was relegated to the Klass B, but were promoted to the Klass A just a year later. The club won the multi-national invitational tournament, the Spengler Cup, in the 1967 and 1969 seasons. The 1971–72 season was the team's last in the Klass A, they finished with only five wins in 32 games, and they were relegated after the season. From 1979 to 1982, while the Sokolniki Ice Palace was being renovated, Lokomotiv played its home games at the Moscow Sports Palace.

After the 1982–83 season, the ice hockey section of Lokomotiv Moscow was dissolved, due to falling popularity, and low attendance.

== Achievements ==
- Spengler Cup champion (2): 1967, 1969.
- Klass B champion (2): 1949, 1971.

== Notable players ==
- Viktor Yakushev
- Yevgeni Zimin
- Boris Mikhailov
- Vladimir Khrushchev
- Yevgeni Mishakov
- Alexander Pashkov
- Nikolai Epschtein
- Yury Tsitsinov
- Victor Tsyplakov

== See also ==
- FC Lokomotiv Moscow
- RC Lokomotiv Moscow
