= Soviet Championship League =

USSR ice hockey top division

Soviet Hockey Championship
- Republics: (Byelorussian Soviet Socialist Republic) Byelorussian SSR (Estonian Soviet Socialist Republic) Estonian SSR (Kazakh Soviet Socialist Republic) Kazakh SSR (Latvian Soviet Socialist Republic) Latvian SSR (Lithuanian Soviet Socialist Republic) Lithuanian SSR (Russian Soviet Federative Socialist Republic) Russian SFSR (Ukrainian Soviet Socialist Republic) Ukrainian SSR
- Founded: 1946; 80 years ago
- Folded: 1992; 34 years ago
- Relegation to: Soviet Class A2; Soviet Class B
- Championship: Soviet Hockey Championship
- Associated title: Soviet Cup
- Most successful club: CSKA Moscow (32)

The Soviet Hockey Championship (Russian: Чемпионат СССР по хоккею) was the highest level ice hockey league in the Soviet Union, running from 1946 to 1992. Before the 1940s the game of ice hockey was not cultivated in Russia, instead the more popular form of hockey was bandy. Following the dissolution of the USSR, the league was temporarily renamed the CIS Championship in 1992. This organization was the direct predecessor of the International Hockey League (Russian: Межнациональная хоккейная Лига), and subsequent Russian Superleague (RSL) and current Kontinental Hockey League (KHL).

== History ==
The Soviet Championship League began in 1946, with 12 teams playing 7 games each. Teams were based in Arkhangelsk, Kaunas, Leningrad, Moscow, Riga, Sverdlovsk, Tallinn and Uzhhorod, and eight of them were from the military or police. The teams were populated with amateur players who were actually full-time athletes hired as regular workers of a company (aircraft industry, food workers, tractor industry) or organization (KGB, Red Army, Soviet Air Force) that sponsored what would be presented as an after-hours social sports society hockey team for their workers. In other words, all Soviet hockey players circumvented the amateur rules of the International Olympic Committee to retain their amateur status and compete in the Olympics, even though for all intents and purposes they were professional.

The league was dominated by Moscow-based teams, who won every title in the league's existence. Far and away the most dominant club in league history was HC CSKA Moscow, the famous "Red Army Team," which won 32 titles, including all but six from 1955 to 1989 and 13 in a row from 1976 to 1989. CSKA was able to pull off such a long run of dominance because during the Soviet era, the entire CSKA organization was a functioning division of the Soviet Armed Forces via the Ministry of Defence. As all able-bodied Soviet males had to serve in the military, the team was thus able to literally draft the best young hockey players in the Soviet Union onto the team. All players were commissioned officers in the Soviet Army. There was a substantial overlap between the rosters of Red Army and the Soviet national team, which was one factor behind the Soviets' near-absolute dominance of international hockey from the 1950s through the early 1990s. By the late 1980s, however, the long run of Red Army dominance caused a significant dropoff in attendance throughout the league.

== Soviet League Champions ==
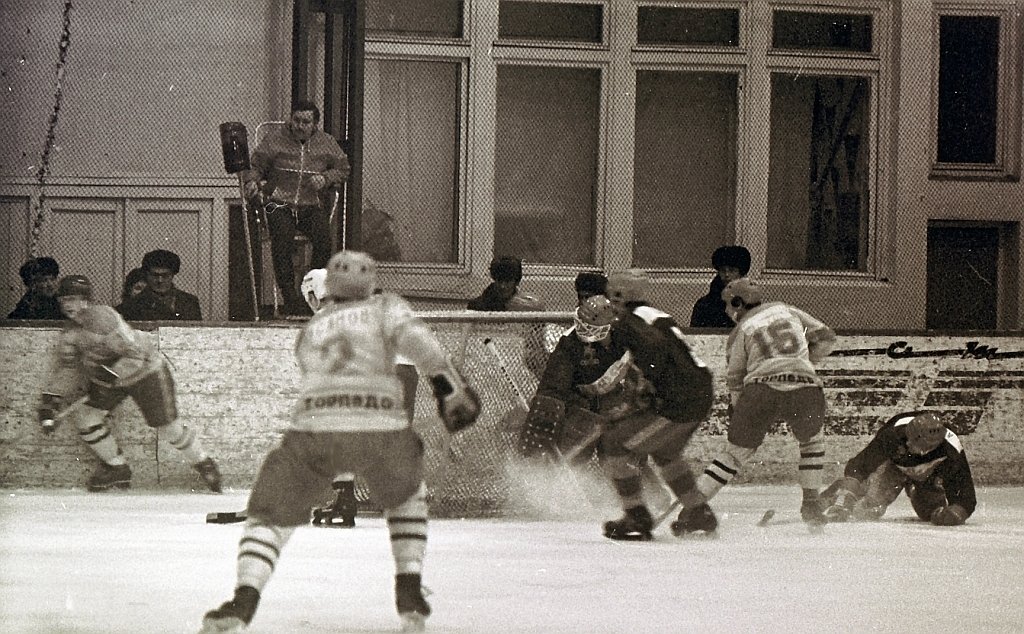
Yaroslavl Torpedo against Salavat Yulaev in 1983

- 1947 – Dynamo Moscow
- 1948 – CSKA Moscow
- 1949 – CSKA Moscow
- 1950 – CSKA Moscow
- 1951 – VVS Moscow
- 1952 – VVS Moscow
- 1953 – VVS Moscow
- 1954 – Dynamo Moscow
- 1955 – CSKA Moscow
- 1956 – CSKA Moscow
- 1957 – Krylya Sovetov Moscow
- 1958 – CSKA Moscow
- 1959 – CSKA Moscow
- 1960 – CSKA Moscow
- 1961 – CSKA Moscow
- 1962 – HC Spartak Moscow
- 1963 – CSKA Moscow
- 1964 – CSKA Moscow
- 1965 – CSKA Moscow
- 1966 – CSKA Moscow
- 1967 – HC Spartak Moscow
- 1968 – CSKA Moscow
- 1969 – HC Spartak Moscow
- 1970 – CSKA Moscow
- 1971 – CSKA Moscow
- 1972 – CSKA Moscow
- 1973 – CSKA Moscow
- 1974 – Krylya Sovetov Moscow
- 1975 – CSKA Moscow
- 1976 – HC Spartak Moscow
- 1977 – CSKA Moscow
- 1978 – CSKA Moscow
- 1979 – CSKA Moscow
- 1980 – CSKA Moscow
- 1981 – CSKA Moscow
- 1982 – CSKA Moscow
- 1983 – CSKA Moscow
- 1984 – CSKA Moscow
- 1985 – CSKA Moscow
- 1986 – CSKA Moscow
- 1987 – CSKA Moscow
- 1988 – CSKA Moscow
- 1989 – CSKA Moscow
- 1990 – Dynamo Moscow
- 1991 – Dynamo Moscow
- 1992 – Dynamo Moscow

== See also ==
- Soviet Cup (ice hockey)
- Russian Open Hockey Championship
- Russian Elite Hockey Scoring Champion
- Russian Elite Hockey Goal Scoring Champion
- Soviet MVP (ice hockey)
- Super Series

== Bibliography ==
- Martin, Lawrence (1990), The Red Machine: The Soviet Quest to Dominate Canada's Game, Toronto: Doubleday Canada, ISBN 0-385-25272-2

Preceded by none	Soviet Championship League; 1946–1992	Succeeded by International Hockey League
