= List of Soviet and Russian ice hockey champions =

Russian Championship
- The Cup of Russia
- Founded: 1946 (1996)
- Region: Russia
- Current champions: Yugra Khanty-Mansiysk (1st title)
- Most championships: CSKA Moscow (37 titles)
- Website: http://www.fhr.ru/main/

The Russian Open Hockey Championship (Russian: Открытый Чемпионат России по хоккею, Otkrytyy Chempionat Rossii po khokkeyu), also known as the Championship of Russia in ice hockey (Russian: Чемпионат России по хоккею с шайбой, Chempionat Rossii po khokkeyu s shayboy), is an annual ice hockey award and national title, bestowed by the Ice Hockey Federation of Russia to the professional hockey organization judged to have the best performing team in Russia.

== History ==
The Russian Championship (formerly Soviet Championship) has acted as the national ice hockey title of Russia since 1946. The Cup of Russia acted as an independent league title awarded in the Russian Hockey League first in 1997–98, before being merged with the Russian Championship. The recipient team of the Cup is awarded an engraved trophy, whereas the top-3 finalists of the Russian Championship are awarded gold, silver, and bronze medals. During the existence of the Russian Championship, several separate league trophies have been handed out intermittently, including the Soviet Cup (USSR), IHL Cup, and currently the Gagarin Cup (KHL).

Historically the title of Champion of Russia was awarded to the club with the best record in the regular season; but the last such case was in 2014–15 KHL season. Starting from the 2015–16 KHL season, the Russian Championship is awarded to the highest-ranked Russian team of the playoffs. 2019–20 KHL season was prematurely ended due to the 2020 coronavirus pandemic in Europe, and medals were awarded based on performance of clubs in the regular championships and in first round of the Gagarin Cup playoffs.

Until 2011–12 KHL season, non-Russian KHL teams were also eligible for Russian Championship. The winner of the regular season receives the Continental Cup (Russian: Кубок Континента, Kubok Kontinenta).

Starting from 2024–25 season, the rights for organization of the Russian Championships were granted to the All-Russian Hockey League (VHL) instead of KHL.

CSKA Moscow has won the most national titles, with 37, and Soviet Cups, with 12.

== List of champions ==
Key

*	Awarded to team with most points in regular season
*	Awarded to the winner of the post-season playoffs
*	Winner of League Cup
(#)	Number of national titles won at the time.

League	Year	(gold) Gold	(silver) Silver	(bronze) Bronze	League Cup
USSR	1946–47	Dynamo Moscow (1)	CDKA Moscow	Spartak Moscow	–
USSR	1947–48	CDKA Moscow (1)	Spartak Moscow	Dynamo Moscow	–
USSR	1948–49	CDKA Moscow (2)	VVS Moscow	Dynamo Moscow	–
USSR	1949–50	CDKA Moscow (3)	Dynamo Moscow	Krylya Sovetov Moscow	–
USSR	1950–51	VVS Moscow (1)	Dynamo Moscow	Krylya Sovetov Moscow	Soviet Cup (1951)
USSR	1951–52	VVS Moscow (2)	CDSA Moscow	Dynamo Moscow	Soviet Cup (1952)
USSR	1952–53	VVS Moscow (3)	CDSA Moscow	Dynamo Moscow	Soviet Cup (1953)
USSR	1953–54	Dynamo Moscow (2)	CDSA Moscow	Krylya Sovetov Moscow	Soviet Cup (1954)
USSR	1954–55	CSK MO Moscow (4)	Krylya Sovetov Moscow	Dynamo Moscow	Soviet Cup (1955)
USSR	1955–56	CSK MO Moscow (5)	Krylya Sovetov Moscow	Dynamo Moscow	Soviet Cup (1956)
USSR	1956–57	Krylya Sovetov Moscow (1)	CSK MO Moscow	Dynamo Moscow	–
USSR	1957–58	CSK MO Moscow (6)	Krylya Sovetov Moscow	Dynamo Moscow	–
USSR	1958–59	CSK MO Moscow (7)	Dynamo Moscow	Krylya Sovetov Moscow	–
USSR	1959–60	CSK MO Moscow (8)	Dynamo Moscow	Krylya Sovetov Moscow	–
USSR	1960–61	CSKA Moscow (9)	Torpedo Gorky	Lokomotiv Moscow	Soviet Cup (1961)
USSR	1961–62	Spartak Moscow (1)	Dynamo Moscow	CSKA Moscow	–
USSR	1962–63	CSKA Moscow (10)	Dynamo Moscow	Spartak Moscow	–
USSR	1963–64	CSKA Moscow (11)	Dynamo Moscow	Spartak Moscow	–
USSR	1964–65	CSKA Moscow (12)	Spartak Moscow	Khimik Voskresensk	–
USSR	1965–66	CSKA Moscow (13)	Spartak Moscow	Dynamo Moscow	Soviet Cup (1966)
USSR	1966–67	Spartak Moscow (2)	CSKA Moscow	Dynamo Moscow	Soviet Cup (1967)
USSR	1967–68	CSKA Moscow (14)	Spartak Moscow	Dynamo Moscow	Soviet Cup (1968)
USSR	1968–69	Spartak Moscow (3)	CSKA Moscow	Dynamo Moscow	Soviet Cup (1969)
USSR	1969–70	CSKA Moscow (15)	Spartak Moscow	Khimik Voskresensk	Soviet Cup (1970)
USSR	1970–71	CSKA Moscow (16)	Dynamo Moscow	SKA Leningrad	–
USSR	1971–72	CSKA Moscow (17)	Dynamo Moscow	Spartak Moscow	Soviet Cup (1972)
USSR	1972–73	CSKA Moscow (18)	Spartak Moscow	Krylya Sovetov Moscow	Soviet Cup (1973)
USSR	1973–74	Krylya Sovetov Moscow (2)	CSKA Moscow	Dynamo Moscow	Soviet Cup (1974)
USSR	1974–75	CSKA Moscow (19)	Krylya Sovetov Moscow	Spartak Moscow	–
USSR	1975–76	Spartak Moscow (4)	CSKA Moscow	Dynamo Moscow	Soviet Cup (1976)
USSR	1976–77	CSKA Moscow (20)	Dynamo Moscow	Traktor Chelyabinsk	Soviet Cup (1977)
USSR	1977–78	CSKA Moscow (21)	Dynamo Moscow	Krylya Sovetov Moscow	–
USSR	1978–79	CSKA Moscow (22)	Dynamo Moscow	Spartak Moscow	Soviet Cup (1979)
USSR	1979–80	CSKA Moscow (23)	Dynamo Moscow	Spartak Moscow	–
USSR	1980–81	CSKA Moscow (24)	Spartak Moscow	Dynamo Moscow	–
USSR	1981–82	CSKA Moscow (25)	Spartak Moscow	Dynamo Moscow	–
USSR	1982–83	CSKA Moscow (26)	Spartak Moscow	Dynamo Moscow	–
USSR	1983–84	CSKA Moscow (27)	Spartak Moscow	Khimik Voskresensk	–
USSR	1984–85	CSKA Moscow (28)	Dynamo Moscow	Sokil Kiev	–
USSR	1985–86	CSKA Moscow (29)	Dynamo Moscow	Spartak Moscow	–
USSR	1986–87	CSKA Moscow (30)	Dynamo Moscow	SKA Leningrad	–
USSR	1987–88	CSKA Moscow (31)	Dinamo Riga	Dynamo Moscow	Soviet Cup (1988)
USSR	1988–89	CSKA Moscow (32)	Khimik Voskresensk	Krylya Sovetov Moscow	League Cup (1989)
USSR	1989–90	Dynamo Moscow (3)	CSKA Moscow	Khimik Voskresensk	–
USSR	1990–91	Dynamo Moscow (4)	Spartak Moscow	Krylya Sovetov Moscow	–
CIS	1991–92	Dynamo Moscow (5)	CSKA Moscow	Spartak Moscow	–
IHL	1992–93	Dynamo Moscow (6)	Lada Togliatti	Krylya Sovetov Moscow; Traktor Chelyabinsk	–
IHL	1993–94	Lada Togliatti (1)	Dynamo Moscow	Traktor Chelyabinsk	IHL Cup
IHL	1994–95	Dynamo Moscow (7)	Lada Togliatti	Metallurg Magnitogorsk; Salavat Yulaev Ufa	–
IHL	1995–96	Lada Togliatti (2)	Dynamo Moscow	Avangard Omsk; Salavat Yulaev Ufa	IHL Cup
RHL	1996–97	Torpedo Yaroslavl (1)	Lada Togliatti	Salavat Yulaev Ufa	–
RHL	1997–98	Ak Bars Kazan (1)	Metallurg Magnitogorsk	Torpedo Yaroslavl	Russian Cup
RHL	1998–99	Metallurg Magnitogorsk (1)	Dynamo Moscow	Torpedo Yaroslavl	–
RSL	1999–00	Dynamo Moscow (8)	Ak Bars Kazan	Metallurg Magnitogorsk; Metallurg Novokuznetsk	–
RSL	2000–01	Metallurg Magnitogorsk (2)	Avangard Omsk	Severstal Cherepovets	–
RSL	2001–02	Lokomotiv Yaroslavl (2)	Ak Bars Kazan	Metallurg Magnitogorsk	–
RSL	2002–03	Lokomotiv Yaroslavl (3)	Severstal Cherepovets	Lada Togliatti	–
RSL	2003–04	Avangard Omsk (1)	Metallurg Magnitogorsk	Ak Bars Kazan; Lada Togliatti	–
RSL	2004–05	Dynamo Moscow (9)	Lada Togliatti	Lokomotiv Yaroslavl	–
RSL	2005–06	Ak Bars Kazan (2)	Avangard Omsk	Metallurg Magnitogorsk	–
RSL	2006–07	Metallurg Magnitogorsk (3)	Ak Bars Kazan	Avangard Omsk	–
RSL	2007–08	Salavat Yulaev Ufa (1)	Lokomotiv Yaroslavl	Metallurg Magnitogorsk	–
KHL	2008–09	Ak Bars Kazan (3)	Lokomotiv Yaroslavl	Metallurg Magnitogorsk	–
KHL	2009–10	Ak Bars Kazan (4)	HC MVD	Salavat Yulaev Ufa	–
KHL	2010–11	Salavat Yulaev Ufa (2)	Atlant Moscow Oblast	Lokomotiv Yaroslavl	–
KHL	2011–12	Dynamo Moscow (10)	Avangard Omsk	Traktor Chelyabinsk	–
KHL	2012–13	Dynamo Moscow (11)	Traktor Chelyabinsk	SKA Saint Petersburg	–
KHL	2013–14	Metallurg Magnitogorsk (4)	Salavat Yulaev Ufa	Lokomotiv Yaroslavl	–
KHL	2014–15	CSKA Moscow (33)	SKA Saint Petersburg	Dynamo Moscow	Gagarin Cup
KHL	2015–16	Metallurg Magnitogorsk (5)	CSKA Moscow	Salavat Yulaev Ufa	–
KHL	2016–17	SKA Saint Petersburg (1)	Metallurg Magnitogorsk	Lokomotiv Yaroslavl	–
KHL	2017–18	Ak Bars Kazan (5)	CSKA Moscow	SKA Saint Petersburg	–
KHL	2018–19	CSKA Moscow (34)	Avangard Omsk	SKA Saint Petersburg	–
KHL	2019–20	CSKA Moscow (35)	Ak Bars Kazan; SKA Saint Petersburg	Dynamo Moscow	–
KHL	2020–21	Avangard Omsk (2)	CSKA Moscow	Ak Bars Kazan	–
KHL	2021–22	CSKA Moscow (36)	Metallurg Magnitogorsk	Traktor Chelyabinsk	–
KHL	2022–23	CSKA Moscow (37)	Ak Bars Kazan	SKA Saint Petersburg	–
KHL	2023–24	Metallurg Magnitogorsk (6)	Lokomotiv Yaroslavl	Avtomobilist Yekaterinburg	–
VHL	2024–25	Torpedo-Gorky Nizhny Novgorod (1)	Khimik Voskresensk (2005)	Dinamo Saint Petersburg	–
VHL	2025–26	Yugra Khanty-Mansiysk (1)	Khimik Voskresensk (2005)	Metallurg Novokuznetsk	–

== Medal summary by club ==
Club	(gold) Winners	(silver) Runners-up	(bronze) Third place	Winning seasons
**CSKA Moscow** (earlier known as CDKA Moscow from 1946 to 1951, as CDSA Moscow from 1951 to 1954 and as CSK MO from 1954 to 1959)	37	14	1	1947–48, 1948–49, 1949–50, 1954–55, 1955–56, 1957–58, 1958–59, 1959–60, 1960–61, 1962–63, 1963–64, 1964–65, 1965–66, 1967–68, 1969–70, 1970–71, 1971–72, 1972–73, 1974–75, 1976–77, 1977–78, 1978–79, 1979–80, 1980–81, 1981–82, 1982–83, 1983–84, 1984–85, 1985–86, 1986–87, 1987–88, 1988–89, 2014–15, 2018–19, 2019–20, 2021–22, 2022–23
**Dynamo Moscow**	11	19	20	1946–47, 1953–54, 1989–90, 1990–91, 1991–92, 1992–93, 1994–95, 1999–00, 2004–05, 2011–12, 2012–13
**Metallurg Magnitogorsk**	6	4	6	1998–99, 2000–01, 2006–07, 2013–14, 2015–16, 2023–24
**Ak Bars Kazan**	5	5	2	1997–98, 2005–06, 2008–09, 2009–10, 2017–18
**Spartak Moscow**	4	11	9	1961–62, 1966–67, 1968–69, 1975–76
**Lokomotiv Yaroslavl** (earlier known as Torpedo Yaroslavl)	3	3	6	1996–97, 2001–02, 2002–03
VVS Moscow	3	1	0	1950–51, 1951–52, 1952–53
Krylya Sovetov Moscow	2	4	10	1956–57, 1973–74
**Avangard Omsk**	2	4	2	2003–04, 2020–21
**Lada Togliatti**	2	4	2	1993–94, 1995–96
**Salavat Yulaev Ufa**	2	1	5	2007–08, 2010–11
**SKA Saint Petersburg** (earlier known as SKA Leningrad)	1	2	6	2016–17
Torpedo-Gorky Nizhny Novgorod	1	0	0	2024–25
Yugra Khanty-Mansiysk	1	0	0	2025–26
Atlant Moscow Oblast (earlier known as Khimik Voskresensk)	0	2	4	–
Khimik Voskresensk (2005)	0	2	0	–
**Traktor Chelyabinsk**	0	1	5	–
**Severstal Cherepovets**	0	1	1	–
Dinamo Riga (original) ^{[*]}	0	1	0	–
HC MVD	0	1	0	–
**Torpedo Nizhny Novgorod** (earlier known as Torpedo Gorky)	0	1	0	–
Metallurg Novokuznetsk	0	0	2	–
**Avtomobilist Yekaterinburg**	0	0	1	–
Dinamo Saint Petersburg	0	0	1	–
Lokomotiv Moscow	0	0	1	–
Sokil Kiev ^{[*]}	0	0	1	–

bold – club is currently member of KHL

italics – indicates club does not exist anymore

^{[*]} – non-Russian based club
