= List of HC Dynamo Moscow seasons =

HC Dynamo Moscow (Russian: Динамо Москва) is a Russian professional ice hockey club based in Moscow. They are members of the Tarasov Division in the Kontinental Hockey League (KHL).

Note: GP = Games played, W = Wins, L = Losses, T = Ties, OTL = Overtime/shootout losses, Pts = Points, GF = Goals for, GA = Goals against, PIM = Penalties in minutes

== International Hockey League champions ==
Gagarin Cup Champions	Lost in finals	League champions	League leader

Season	GP	W	T	L	OTL	Pts	GF	GA	Finish	Playoffs
1988–89	36	19	5	12	-	53	128	98	4th, League	4th place (Playoffs not held)
1989–90	48	35	5	8	-	75	201	106	1st, League	Soviet League Champions (Playoffs not held)
1990–91	46	30	8	8	-	68	186	99	1st, League	Soviet League Champions (Playoffs not held)
1991–92	30	25	3	2	-	53	124	58	1st	Won in semifinals, 4-0 (Spartak Moscow); Soviet League Champions, 3-0 (CSKA)
International Hockey League
1992–93	42	26	7	9	-	61	141	83	1st, Western	Won in round of 16, 2-0 (Torpedo NN); Won in quarterfinals, 2-0 (Torpedo); Won in semifinals, 2-1 (Traktor); IHL champions, 3-0 (Lada)
1993–94	46	30	8	8	-	68	197	126	2nd, League	2nd place (Playoffs not held)
1994–95	52	30	6	16	-	66	172	107	3rd, Western	Won in round of 16, 2-1 (Molot-Prikamye); Won in quarterfinals, 2-1 (Avangard); Won in semifinals, 2-1 (Salavat Yulaev); IHL champions, 3-2 (Lada)
1995–96	26	18	3	5	-	46	79	53	2nd, League	2nd place (Playoffs not held)
Russian Superleague
1996–97	38	17	7	14	-	41	105	88	6th	Won in round of 16, 2-0 (Traktor); Lost in quarterfinals, 0-2 (Torpedo)
1997–98	46	30	6	10	-	66	151	91	5th, League	Not held
1998–99	42	26	11	5	-	63	127	63	3rd	Won in round of 16, 3-0 (Mechel); Won in quarterfinals, 3-1 (Lada); Won in semifinals, 3-0 (Ak Bars); Lost in Finals, 2-4 (Metallurg M)
1999–00	38	26	4	6	2	84	121	62	1st	Won in round of 16, 3-0 (Dinamo-Energija); Won in quarterfinals, 3-1 (Lada); Won in semifinals, 3-2 (Metallurg N); Russian Superleague Champions, 4-1 (Ak Bars)
2000–01	34	13	3	16	2	42	67	87	13th	Did not qualify
2001–02	51	28	6	14	3	89	127	98	7th	Lost in round of 16, 0-3 (Ak Bars)
2002–03	51	25	11	14	1	84	123	102	7th	Lost in round of 16, 2-3 (Avangard)
2003–04	57	30	12	17	1	101	133	108	6th	Lost in round of 16, 0-3 (Avangard)
2004–05	60	40	7	9	4	126	179	106	1st	Won in quarterfinals, 3-0 (Neftekhimik); Won in semifinals, 3-1 (Avangard); Russian Superleague Champions, 3-0 (Lada)
2005–06	51	23	4	18	6	76	131	122	8th	Lost in round of 16, 1-3 (Lada)
2006–07	54	24	5	23	2	78	148	144	10th	Lost in round of 16, 0-3 (Lokomotiv)
2007–08	57	27	-	21	9	82	138	148	9th	Won in round of 16, 3-1 (Avangard); Lost in quarterfinals, 2-3 (Metallurg M)
Kontinental Hockey League
2008–09	56	27	-	17	2	100	184	143	2nd, Chernyshev	Won in preliminary round, 3-0 (Dinamo Riga); Won in quarterfinals, 3-0 (CSKA); Lost in semifinals, 2-4 (Ak Bars)
2009–10	56	28	-	16	3	101	166	151	2nd, Bobrov	Lost in conference quarterfinals, 1-3 (Spartak Moscow)
2010–11	54	28	-	16	4	96	149	131	1st, Bobrov	Lost in conference quarterfinals, 2-4 (Dinamo Riga)
2011–12	54	35	-	15	4	105	144	115	2nd, Bobrov	Won in conference quarterfinals, 4-0 (Dinamo Minsk); Won in conference semifinals, 4-2 (Torpedo NN); Won in conference finals, 4-0 (SKA); Gagarin Cup Champions, 4-3 (Avangard)
2012–13	52	36	-	14	2	101	150	115	2nd, Bobrov	Won in conference quarterfinals, 4-0 (Slovan); Won in conference semifinals, 4-1 (CSKA); Won in conference finals, 4-2 (SKA); Gagarin Cup Champions, 4-2 (Traktor)
2013–14	54	38	-	11	5	115	171	113	1st, Tarasov	Lost in conference quarterfinals, 3-4 (Lokomotiv)
2014–15	60	41	-	13	6	123	172	120	2nd, Tarasov	Won in conference quarterfinals, 4-2 (Lokomotiv); Lost in conference semifinals, 1-4 (SKA)
2015–16	60	35	-	17	8	105	167	126	4th, Tarasov	Won in conference quarterfinals, 4-0 (Sochi); Lost in conference semifinals, 2-4 (SKA)
2016–17	60	39	-	16	5	112	164	111	2nd, Tarasov	Won in conference quarterfinals, 4-1 (Torpedo NN); Lost in conference semifinals, 1-4 (SKA)
2017–18	56	28	-	23	5	80	134	139	6th, Tarasov	Did not qualify

- In 1993-94 and 1995–96, the winner of the Regular Season became the League Champion. After the season was the IHL Cup - it was a single event. In 1992-93 and 1994–95, the winner of the Playoffs became the League Champion.

=== IHL Cup ===
Season	Cup
1993–94	Won in round of 16, 2-1 (Avangard); Won in quarterfinals, 2-0 (Itil); Won in semifinals, 2-0 (Traktor); Lost in Cup Finals, 2-3 (Lada)
1995–96	Won in round of 16, 2-1 (CSKA); Won in quarterfinals, 2-1 (Ak Bars); Won in semifinals, 2-1 (Rubin); IHL Cup Champions, 3-1 (Metallurg M)

=== Russian Cup ===
Season	Cup
1997–98	Won in round of 16, 2-0 (Rubin); Won in quarterfinals, 2-1 (Lada); Won in semifinals, 2-1 (Ak Bars); Lost in Finals, 1-3 (Metallurg M)
