= Vitaly Tomilin =

Russian ice hockey player

- Born: January 15, 1974 (age 51) Elektrostal, Russian SFSR, Soviet Union
- Height: 6 ft 0 in (183 cm)
- Weight: 209 lb (95 kg; 14 st 13 lb)
- Position: Centre
- Shot: Left
- Played for: Krylya Sovetov Moscow
- National team: Russia
- NHL draft: 90th overall, 1992; New Jersey Devils
- Playing career: 1990–2012

Vitaly Tomilin is a Russian ice hockey player. The second-best scorer for the Russian junior squad at the '93 IIHF World Junior Championships, Tomilin tallied two goals and added five assists in seven contests. The New Jersey Devils drafted the 19-year-old centre with their fourth pick in the '92 entry draft.

== Career statistics ==
			Regular season					Playoffs
Season	Team	League	GP	G	A	Pts	PIM	GP	G	A	Pts	PIM
1990–91	Krylia Sovetov Moskva	Soviet	1	0	0	0	0	—	—	—	—	—
1990–91	Kristall Elektrostal	Soviet2	18	3	3	6	8	—	—	—	—	—
1991–92	Krylia Sovetov Moskva	Soviet	34	1	1	2	6	3	0	0	0	2
1992–93	Krylia Sovetov Moskva	Russia	28	0	1	1	14	2	0	0	0	0
1992–93	Krylia Sovetov-2 Moskva	Russia2	26	11	8	19	26	—	—	—	—	—
1993–94	Krylia Sovetov Moskva	Russia	44	5	4	9	62	3	0	0	0	0
1993–94	Krylia Sovetov Moskva-2	Russia3	3	0	0	0	4	—	—	—	—	—
1994–95	Krylia Sovetov Moskva	Russia	47	4	5	9	43	2	0	0	0	2
1994–95	Krylia Sovetov-2 Moskva	Russia2	1	0	0	0	0	—	—	—	—	—
1994–95	Soviet Wings	IHL	15	3	2	5	14	—	—	—	—	—
1995–96	Krylia Sovetov Moskva	Russia	21	2	2	4	10	—	—	—	—	—
1995–96	Kristall Elektrostal	Russia	29	4	3	7	18	2	0	0	0	2
1996–97	Kristall Elektrostal	Russia	23	0	1	1	8	—	—	—	—	—
1996–97	Kristall Elektrostal-2	Russia3	2	2	2	4	2	—	—	—	—	—
1997–98	Kristall Elektrostal	Russia	23	3	2	5	10	—	—	—	—	—
1997–98	Kristall Elektrostal-2	Russia3	2	3	1	4	2	—	—	—	—	—
1997–98	Krylia Sovetov Moskva	Russia	20	2	1	3	14	—	—	—	—	—
1998–99	HC CSKA Moscow	Russia2	12	0	3	3	33	—	—	—	—	—
1998–99	Krylia Sovetov Moskva	Russia	27	4	0	4	10	—	—	—	—	—
2000–01	Amur Khabarovsk	Russia	6	0	0	0	8	—	—	—	—	—
2000–01	Amur Khabarovsk-2	Russia3	5	1	0	1	4	—	—	—	—	—
2000–01	Elemash Elektrostal	Russia2	26	2	2	4	16	—	—	—	—	—
2000–01	Elemash Elektrostal-2	Russia3	3	0	0	0	0	—	—	—	—	—
2001–02	Elemash Elektrostal	Russia2	47	9	7	16	20	—	—	—	—	—
2001–02	Elemash Elektrostal-2	Russia3	3	1	1	2	2	—	—	—	—	—
2002–03	Elemash Elektrostal	Russia2	6	0	0	0	0	—	—	—	—	—
2002–03	Elemash Elektrostal-2	Russia3	4	0	1	1	0	—	—	—	—	—
2003–04	HC Vladimir	Russia3	57	16	20	36	68	—	—	—	—	—
2005–06	Keramin Minsk	Belarus	47	14	10	24	67	4	1	0	1	4
2006–07	Khimvolokno Mogilev	Belarus	32	5	5	10	38	4	0	0	0	4
2008–09	Khimvolokno Mogilev	Belarus	25	4	9	13	80	3	1	1	2	6
2008–09	Khimvolokno Mogilev-2	Belarus2	1	0	1	1	0	—	—	—	—	—
2009–10	Khimvolokno-Mogilev	Belarus	37	8	9	17	14	4	1	0	1	4
2009–10	Khimvolokno Mogilev-2	Belarus2	4	2	3	5	6	—	—	—	—	—
2010–11	HK Mogilev	Belarus	47	10	5	15	34	—	—	—	—	—
2011–12	HK Mogilev	Belarus	2	0	1	1	2	—	—	—	—	—
Russia totals			268	24	19	43	197	56	5	5	10	30
Russia2 totals			118	22	20	42	95	—	—	—	—	—
Belarus totals			190	41	39	80	235	15	3	1	4	18
