= 1970–71 Soviet Cup (ice hockey) =

Soviet cup ice hockey tournament

The 1970–71 Soviet Cup was the 13th edition of the Soviet Cup ice hockey tournament. 32 teams participated in the tournament, which was won by Spartak Moscow, who claimed their second title.

== Participating teams ==
Soviet Championship League teams:	Pervaya Liga teams:	Other teams:
Torpedo Gorky; SKA Leningrad; Krylya Sovetov Moscow; Spartak Moscow; CSKA Moscow; Sibir Novosibirsk; Traktor Chelyabinsk; Khimik Voskresensk	Awtomobilist Alma-Ata; Khimik Dniprodzerzhynsk; Kristall Elektrostal; Torpedo Yaroslavl; SK Uritskogo Kazan; Dynamo Kiev; Dynamo Leningrad; Torpedo Minsk; Lokomotiv Moscow; Sputnik Nizhny Tagil; SKA Novosibirsk; Dizelist Penza; Molot Perm; Dinamo Riga; Kristall Saratov; Avtomobilist Sverdlovsk; Salavat Yulaev Ufa; Torpedo Ust-Kamenogorsk	Titan Berezniki; Inkaras Kaunas; Dinamo Minsk; Vimpel Minsk; RVZ Riga; TEZ Tallinn

== Tournament ==
=== First round ===
Inkaras Kaunas	unknown	Avtomobilist Alma-Ata
Dynamo Leningrad	4:7	Torpedo Yaroslavl
Sputnik Nizhny Tagil	6:2	Dinamo Riga
Titan Berezniki	7:0	Khimik Dniprodzerzhynsk
SK Uritskogo Kazan	unknown	SKA Novosibirsk
RVZ Riga	4:0	Torpedo Ust-Kamenogorsk
Kristall Elektrostal	5:4	Dizelist Penza
TEZ Tallinn	2:8	Vimpel Minsk

=== Second round ===
Inkaras Kaunas	1:17	Torpedo Minsk
Torpedo Yaroslavl	0:1	Sibir Novosibirsk
Sputnik Nizhny Tagil	7:4	Avtomobilist Sverdlovsk
Titan Berezniki	2:5	Dynamo Kiev
SK Uritskogo Kazan	4:9	Kristall Saratov
RVZ Riga	1:5	Salavat Yulaev Ufa
Wimpel Minsk	3:16	Lokomotiv Moscow
Kristall Elektrostal	5:3	Molot Perm

=== 1/8 finals ===
Torpedo Minsk	4:6	Spartak Moscow
Dinamo Minsk	10:4	Sibir Novosibirsk
Sputnik Nizhny Tagil	3:1	Krylya Sovetov Moscow
Khimik Voskresensk	12:3	Dynamo Kiev
Lokomotiv Moscow	3:1	Torpedo Gorky
CSKA Moscow	5:3	Kristall Elektrostal
SKA Leningrad	4:3	Kristall Saratov
Traktor Chelyabinsk	6:4	Salavat Yulaev Ufa

=== Quarterfinals ===
Spartak Moscow	5:4 SO	Dynamo Moscow
Sputnik Nizhny Tagil	2:10	Khimik Voskresensk
Lokomotiv Moscow	5:7	CSKA Moscow
SKA Leningrad	4:2	Traktor Chelyabinsk

=== Semifinals ===
Spartak Moscow	2:1 SO	Khimik Voskresensk
CSKA Moscow	5:7	SKA Leningrad

=== Final ===
Spartak Moscow	5:1	SKA Leningrad
