= Alexander Gulyavtsev =

Russian ice hockey player (born 1973)

- Born: 3 May 1973 (age 53) Perm, USSR
- Height: 5 ft 8 in (173 cm)
- Weight: 190 lb (86 kg; 13 st 8 lb)
- Position: Right wing
- Shot: Left
- Played for: Molot-Prikamye Perm; Neftekhimik Nizhnekamsk; Metallurg Magnitogorsk; Severstal Cherepovets; Avtomobilist Yekaterinburg
- Playing career: 1991–2011

Alexander Gulyavtsev (Russian: Александр Вячеславович Гулявцев, born 3 May 1973) is a Russian former professional ice hockey winger who last played competitively with Avtomobilist Yekaterinburg of the KHL. He is currently the general manager of Molot-Prikamye Perm of the VHL.

Gulyavtsev joined Khabarovsk as the head coach in the midst of the 2018–19 season, after previously being fired from former club Severstal Cherepovets on November 12, 2018.

== Career statistics ==
=== Regular season and playoffs ===
			Regular season					Playoffs
Season	Team	League	GP	G	A	Pts	PIM	GP	G	A	Pts	PIM
1990–91	Molot Perm	USR.2	10	2	2	4	4	—	—	—	—	—
1991–92	Molot Perm	CIS.2	58	15	6	21	26	—	—	—	—	—
1992–93	Molot Perm	IHL	36	6	4	10	26	—	—	—	—	—
1992–93	Rossiya Krasnokamsk	RUS.2	3	0	0	0	6	—	—	—	—	—
1993–94	Molot Perm	IHL	25	1	5	6	15	—	—	—	—	—
1994–95	Molot Perm	IHL	51	15	9	24	64	3	0	0	0	6
1995–96	Molot Perm	IHL	49	13	9	22	34	2	0	1	1	0
1996–97	Molot Perm	RSL	35	14	8	22	24	—	—	—	—	—
1997–98	Molot-Prikamye Perm	RSL	44	13	15	28	55	2	0	0	0	2
1997–98	Molot-Prikamye–2 Perm	RUS.3	1	0	1	1	0	—	—	—	—	—
1998–99	Molot-Prikamye Perm	RSL	37	13	20	33	28	2	1	0	1	0
1999–2000	Molot-Prikamye Perm	RSL	33	22	16	38	44	3	0	0	0	2
2000–01	Molot-Prikamye Perm	RSL	36	14	19	33	28	—	—	—	—	—
2001–02	Neftekhimik Nizhnekamsk	RSL	21	2	3	5	16	—	—	—	—	—
2002–03	Neftekhimik Nizhnekamsk	RSL	20	2	5	7	14	—	—	—	—	—
2002–03	Metallurg Magnitogorsk	RSL	10	1	1	2	2	2	0	0	0	2
2003–04	Molot-Prikamye Perm	RUS.2	34	14	21	35	18	14	4	11	15	2
2004–05	Molot-Prikamye Perm	RSL	22	4	6	10	40	—	—	—	—	—
2004–05	Severstal Cherepovets	RSL	20	2	7	9	6	—	—	—	—	—
2005–06	Severstal Cherepovets	RSL	35	6	9	15	20	4	0	1	1	0
2006–07	Severstal Cherepovets	RSL	33	4	5	9	45	4	1	1	2	2
2007–08	Avtomobilist Yekaterinburg	RUS.2	44	16	9	25	16	12	4	6	10	0
2008–09	Avtomobilist Yekaterinburg	RUS.2	40	20	30	50	28	7	1	1	2	4
2009–10	Avtomobilist Yekaterinburg	KHL	45	9	19	28	30	4	0	2	2	0
2010–11	Avtomobilist Yekaterinburg	KHL	45	9	17	26	20	—	—	—	—	—
IHL totals			161	35	27	62	139	5	0	1	1	6
RSL totals			346	97	114	211	323	17	2	3	5	14
KHL totals			90	18	36	54	50	4	0	2	2	0

=== International ===
Year	Team	Event	GP	G	A	Pts	PIM
1993	Russia	WJC	6	1	3	4	2
