= Denis Kartsev =

Russian professional ice hockey winger (born 1976)

- Born: April 25, 1976 (age 49); Moscow, Russian SFSR, USSR
- Height: 6 ft 0 in (183 cm)
- Weight: 220 lb (100 kg; 15 st 10 lb)
- Position: Center
- Shot: Left
- Played for: Dynamo Moskva; Lada Togliatti; HK MVD; Torpedo Nizhny Novgorod; Khimik Voskresensk; Sibir Novosibirsk; Metallurg Zhlobin; Molot-Prikamie Perm; Krylya Sovetov Moscow
- National team: Russia
- NHL draft: Undrafted
- Playing career: 1994–2011

Denis Kartsev is a Russian professional ice hockey winger who currently plays for HC Sibir Novosibirsk of the Kontinental Hockey League (KHL).

== Career statistics ==
			Regular season					Playoffs
Season	Team	League	GP	G	A	Pts	PIM	GP	G	A	Pts	PIM
1994–95	Dynamo Moskva	IHL	7	1	0	1	0	2	0	0	0	0
1995–96	Dynamo Moskva	IHL	28	4	1	5	4	—	—	—	—	—
1996–97	Dynamo Moskva	Russia	39	8	6	14	22	4	0	0	0	0
1997–98	Dynamo Moskva	Russia	40	6	5	11	18	—	—	—	—	—
1998–99	Dynamo Moskva-2	Russia2	4	0	1	1	6	—	—	—	—	—
1998–99	Dynamo Moskva	Russia	40	8	7	15	8	16	1	2	3	10
1999–00	Dynamo Moskva	Russia	36	4	8	12	14	17	5	6	11	6
2000–01	Dynamo Moskva	Russia	33	8	10	18	14	—	—	—	—	—
2001–02	Dynamo Moskva	Russia	47	7	8	15	22	3	1	0	1	2
2002–03	Dynamo Moskva	Russia	40	3	7	10	38	5	1	0	1	4
2003–04	Dynamo Moskva	Russia	28	4	3	7	14	3	0	0	0	2
2004–05	Dynamo Moskva	Russia	32	1	7	8	28	—	—	—	—	—
2005–06	Lada Togliatti	Russia	29	6	2	8	28	8	5	0	5	12
2006–07	Lada Togliatti	Russia	49	8	11	19	44	3	1	0	1	6
2007–08	HK MVD Balashikha-2	Russia3	6	3	4	7	4	—	—	—	—	—
2007–08	HK MVD	Russia	6	0	0	0	4	—	—	—	—	—
2007–08	Torpedo Nizhny Novgorod	Russia	12	2	0	2	12	—	—	—	—	—
2007–08	Torpedo Nizhny Novgorod-2	Russia3	4	2	0	2	0	—	—	—	—	—
2008–09	Khimik Voskresensk	KHL	41	7	7	14	28	—	—	—	—	—
2008–09	Lada Togliatti	KHL	13	2	2	4	10	4	0	0	0	4
2009–10	Sibir Novosibirsk	KHL	56	11	11	22	56	—	—	—	—	—
2010–11	Metallurg Zhlobin	Belarus	5	1	2	3	4	—	—	—	—	—
2010–11	Molot-Prikamie Perm	VHL	6	0	0	0	6	—	—	—	—	—
2010–11	Krylya Sovetov Moscow	VHL	13	0	3	3	16	5	0	0	0	6
Russia totals			466	70	75	145	270	61	14	8	22	42
KHL totals			110	20	20	40	94	4	0	0	0	4
