= 1971–72 Soviet Cup (ice hockey) =

The 1971–72 Soviet Cup was the 14th edition of the Soviet Cup ice hockey tournament. 30 teams participated in the tournament, which was won by Dynamo Moscow, who claimed their second title.

== Participating teams ==
Soviet Championship League teams:	Pervaya Liga teams:	Other teams:
Torpedo Gorky; SKA Leningrad; Dynamo Moscow; Krylya Sovetov Moscow; Lokomotiv Moscow; Spartak Moscow; CSKA Moscow; Traktor Chelyabinsk; Khimik Voskresensk	Khimik Dniprodzerzhynsk; Kristall Elektrostal; SKA MVO Kalinin; SK Uritskogo Kazan; HK Dynamo Kiev; Torpedo Minsk; Sputnik Nizhny Tagil; Metallurg Novokuznetsk; Sibir Novosibirsk; Kauchuk Omsk; Dizelist Penza; Molot Perm; Dinamo Riga; Kristall Saratov; Avtomobilist Sverdlovsk; Metallurg Cherepovets; Salavat Yulaev Ufa; Torpedo Ust-Kamenogorsk	SKIF Minsk; RVZ Riga; Ekskavator Tallinn

== Tournament ==
=== First round ===
Dizelist Penza	5:2	Metallurg Cherepovets
Sputnik Nizhny Tagil	4:1	RVZ Riga
Kristall Elektrostal	6:2	SK Uritskogo Kazan
SKA MVO Kalinin	5:2	SKIF Minsk
Kautschuk Omsk	15:0	Ekskavator Tallinn
Molot Perm	5:3	Metallurg Novokuznetsk

=== 1/16 finals ===
Sputnik Nizhny Tagil	2:3	Avtomobilist Sverdlovsk
Lokomotiv Moscow	8:2	Dizelist Penza
Sibir Novosibirsk	7:0	Torpedo Ust-Kamenogorsk
Kristall Elektrostal	3:2	Kristall Saratov
Molot Perm	5:2	Torpedo Minsk
Dinamo Riga	10:1	Khimik Dniprodzerzhynsk
SKA MVO Kalinin	3:2	Dynamo Kiev
Kautschuk Omsk	3:1	Salavat Yulaev Ufa

=== 1/8 finals ===
CSKA Moscow	5:3	Lokomotiv Moscow
Khimik Voskresensk'	10:6	Avtomobilist Sverdlovsk
Traktor Chelyabinsk	7:4	Sibir Novosibirsk
Kristall Saratov	4:7	SKA Leningrad
SKA MVO Kalinin	7:8	Spartak Moscow
Kautschuk Omsk	3:6	Torpedo Gorky
Dinamo Riga	3:1	Krylya Sovetov Moscow
Dynamo Moscow	(W)	Molot Perm

=== Quarterfinals ===
CSKA Moscow	4:5	Khimik Voskresensk
Traktor Chelyabinsk	5:3	SKA Leningrad
Spartak Moscow	6:2	Torpedo Gorky
Dinamo Riga	4:6	Dynamo Moscow

=== Semifinals ===
Khimik Voskresensk	4:2	Traktor Chelyabinsk
Spartak Moscow	1:5	Dynamo Moscow

=== Final ===
Dynamo Moscow	3:0	Khimik Voskresensk
