= 1966–67 Soviet Cup (ice hockey) =

The 1966–67 Soviet Cup was the ninth edition of the Soviet Cup ice hockey tournament. 35 teams participated in the tournament, which was won by CSKA Moscow for the sixth consecutive season.

== Participating teams ==
Soviet Championship League teams:	Pervaya Liga teams:	Other teams:
Torpedo Gorky; Dynamo Kiev; SKA Leningrad; Torpedo Minsk; Dynamo Moscow; Krylya Sovetov Moscow; Lokomotiv Moscow; Spartak Moscow; CSKA Moscow; Metallurg Novokuznetsk; Sibir Novosibirsk; Khimik Voskresensk	Kristall Elektrostal; SKA Kalinin; SK Uritskogo Kazan; Sputnik Nizhny Tagil; SKA Novosibirsk; Dizelist Penza; Molot Perm; Daugava Riga; Avtomobilist Sverdlovsk; Traktor Chelyabinsk; Salavat Yulaev Ufa; Torpedo Ust-Kamenogorsk	Ermak Angarsk; Progress Glazov; SKA Kuibyshev; Dynamo Leningrad; Aeroflot Omsk; Energija Saratov; Metallurg Serov; Mashinostroitel Zlatoust; Voskhod Chelyabinsk; Zvezda Chebarkul; Metallurg Cherepovets

== Tournament ==
=== First round ===
Voskhod Chelyabinsk	1:6	Molot Perm
Dynamo Leningrad	3:2	Energija Saratov
Metallurg Serov	7:6	Traktor Chelyabinsk

=== 1/16 finals ===
Daugava Riga	0:5	Spartak Moscow
SKA Kuibyshev	3:9	SKA Novosibirsk
Mashinostroitel Zlatoust	1:3	Krylya Sovetov Moscow
Kristall Elektrostal	1:3	Torpedo Gorky
Sputnik Nizhny Tagil	5:12	SKA Leningrad
Salavat Yulaev Ufa	4:8	Dynamo Moscow
Dynamo Leningrad	4:3	Metallurg Serov
Dizelist Penza	2:11	Khimik Voskresensk
Zvezda Cherbakul	5:3	SK Uritskogo Kasan
SKA MVO Kalinin	2:1	Torpedo Minsk
Metallurg Cherepovets	4:9	Lokomotiv Moscow
Aeroflot Omsk	3:1	Sibir Novosibirsk
Progress Glazov	5:6 OT	Dynamo Kiev
Avtomobilist Sverdlovsk	3:9	CSKA Moscow
Molot Perm	(W)	Ermak Angarsk
Torpedo Ust-Kamenogorsk	(W)	Metallurg Novokuznetsk

=== 1/8 finals ===
Spartak Moscow	(W)	SKA Novosibirsk
Krylya Sovetov Moscow	3:1	Torpedo Gorky
SKA Leningrad	4:2	Torpedo Ust-Kamenogorsk
Dynamo Moscow	4:3	Molot Perm
Khimik Voskresensk	4:3	Dynamo Leningrad
Zvezda Cherbakul	4:5	SKA MVO Kalinin
Lokomotiv Moscow	2:0	Aeroflot Omsk
Dynamo Kiev	2:7	CSKA Moscow

=== Quarterfinals ===
Spartak Moscow	10:5	Krylya Sovetov Moscow
SKA Leningrad	5:1	Dynamo Moscow
SKA MVO Kalinin	4:3	Khimik Voskresensk
Lokomotiv Moscow	1:6	CSKA Moscow

=== Semifinals ===
Spartak Moscow	7:4	SKA Leningrad
SKA MVO Kalinin	3:4 OT	CSKA Moscow

=== Final ===
CSKA Moscow	2:0	Spartak Moscow
