= 1968–69 Soviet Cup (ice hockey) =

1968-69 edition of Soviet ice hockey tournament

The 1968–69 Soviet Cup was the 11th edition of the Soviet Cup ice hockey tournament. 46 teams participated in the tournament, which was won by CSKA Moscow for the eighth consecutive season.

== Participating teams ==
Soviet Championship League teams:	Pervaya Liga teams:	Vtoraya Liga teams:
Torpedo Gorky; Dynamo Kiev; SKA Leningrad; Dynamo Moscow; Krylya Sovetov Moscow; Lokomotiv Moscow; Spartak Moscow; CSKA Moscow; Sibir Novosibirsk; Avtomobilist Sverdlovsk; Traktor Chelyabinsk; Khimik Voskresensk	Kristall Elektrostal; SK Uritskogo Kazan; Dinamo Minsk; Metallurg Novokuznetsk; SKA Novosibirsk; Dizelist Penza; Molot Perm; Energija Saratov; Voskhod Chelyabinsk; Zvezda Chebarkul; Salavat Yulaev Ufa; Torpedo Ust-Kamenogorsk	Avtomobilist Alma-Ata; Ermak Angarsk; Motor Barnaul; Khimik Dniprodzerzhynsk; Progress Glazov; Torpedo Yaroslavl; SKA MVO Kalinin; Stroitel Kemerovo; Olimpiya Kirovo-Chepetsk; SKA Kuibyshev; Dynamo Leningrad; Sputnik Nizhny Tagil; Kauchuk Omsk; Torpedo Podolsk; Shakhtyor Prokopyevsk; Dinamo Riga; Metallurg Serov; Taganai Zlatoust; Vodnik Tyumen; Burevestnik Chelyabinsk; Metallurg Cherepovets; Torpedo Ulyanovsk

== Tournament ==
=== First round ===
Kautschuk Omsk	7:4	SKA Novosibirsk
Burevestnik Chelyabinsk	3:5	Energija Saratov
Ermak Angarsk	8:4	Torpedo Ulyanovsk
Lokomotiv Moscow	(W)	Motor Barnaul
Shakhtor Prokopyevsk	10:0	Metallurg Novokuznetsk
Progress Glazov	1:4	Molot Perm
Avtomobilist Alma-Ata	6:1	Olimpiya Kirovo-Chepetsk
SK Uritskogo Kazan	1:8	Khimik Voskresensk
Torpedo Jaroslawl	4:5	Dinamo Minsk
Sputnik Nizhny Tagil	5:3	Dynamo Leningrad
Metallurg Serov	0:1	Taganai Zlatoust
Stroitel Kemerovo	4:8	Torpedo Ust-Kamenogorsk
SKA Kuibyshev	2:4	Vodnik Tyumen
SKA MVO Kalinin	1:2	Traktor Chelyabinsk

=== 1/16 finals ===
Zvezda Cherbakul	1:8	CSKA Moscow
Salavat Yulaev Ufa	4:3	Dynamo Kiev
Dinamo Riga	7:4	Kristall Elektrostal
Torpedo Podolsk	1:4	Torpedo Gorky
Krylya Sovetov Moscow	8:6	Kautschuk Omsk
Ermak Angarsk	(W)	Energija Saratov
Lokomotiv Moscow	3:4	Shakhtor Prokopyevsk
Molot Perm	(W)	Avtomobilist Alma-Ata
Khimik Voskresensk	2:4	Dynamo Moscow
Sputnik Nizhny Tagil	4:3	Taganai Zlatoust
Vodnik Tyumen	(W)	Torpedo Ust-Kamenogorsk
Traktor Chelyabinsk	4:6	Sibir Novosibirsk
Metallurg Cherepovets	1:5	SKA Leningrad
Dizelist Penza	4:6	Avtomobilist Sverdlovsk
Voskhod Chelyabinsk	2:8	Torpedo Minsk
Khimik Dniprodzerzhynsk	0:9	Spartak Moscow

=== 1/8 finals ===
CSKA Moscow	10:3	Salavat Yulaev Ufa
Torpedo Gorky	5:4	Dinamo Riga
Krylya Sovetov Moscow	8:3	Ermak Angarsk
Molot Perm	(W)	Shakhtor Prokopyevsk
Dynamo Moscow	4:3	Sputnik Nizhny Tagil
Vodnik Tyumen	6:3	Sibir Novosibirsk
Torpedo Minsk	2:3 OT	Spartak Moscow
SKA Leningrad	4:2	Avtomobilist Sverdlovsk

=== Quarterfinals ===
CsSKA Moscow	4:2	Torpedo Gorky
Krylya Sovetov Moscow	(W)	Molot Perm
Dynamo Moscow	7:2	Vodnik Tyumen
Spartak Moscow	3:1	SKA Leningrad

=== Semifinals ===
CSKA Moscow	8:3	Krylya Sovetov Moscow
Dynamo Moscow	5:4	Spartak Moscow

=== Final ===
CSKA Moscow	3:1	Dynamo Moscow
