= 1967–68 Soviet Cup (ice hockey) =

The 1967–68 Soviet Cup was the 10th edition of the Soviet Cup ice hockey tournament. 40 teams participated in the tournament, which was won by CSKA Moscow for the seventh consecutive season.

== Participating teams ==
Soviet Championship League teams:	Pervaya Liga teams:	Vtoraya Liga teams:
Torpedo Gorky; Dynamo Kiev; SKA Leningrad; Dynamo Moscow; Krylya Sovetov Moscow; Lokomotiv Moscow; Spartak Moscow; CSKA Moscow; Metallurg Novokuznetsk; Sibir Novosibirsk; Avtomobilist Sverdlovsk; Khimik Voskresensk	Kristall Elektrostal; SK Uritskogo Kazan; Dynamo Leningrad; Torpedo Minsk; SKA Novosibirsk; Dizelist Penza; Molot Perm; Dinamo Riga; Energiya Saratov; Traktor Chelyabinsk; Salavat Yulaev Ufa; Torpedo Ust-Kamenogorsk	Avtomobilist Alma-Ata; Ermak Angarsk; Motor Barnaul; Progress Glazov; Torpedo Yaroslavl; SKA MVO Kalinin; Olimpiya Kirovo-Chepetsk; SKA Kuibyshev; Kauchuk Omsk; Shakhtyor Prokopyevsk; Metallurg Serov; Taganai Zlatoust; Sputnik Nizhny Tagil; Voskhod Chelyabinsk; Zvezda Chebarkul; Metallurg Cherepovets

== Tournament ==
=== First round ===
Avtomobilist Sverdlovsk	8:4	Taganai Zlatoust
Progress Glazov	7:4	Olimpiya Kirovo-Chepetsk
Avtomobilist Alma-Ata	9:5	Metallurg Serov
Dynamo Kiev	3:2 OT	Shakhtor Prokopyevsk
Krylya Sovetov Moscow	5:2	Traktor Chelyabinsk
Motor Barnaul	4:4 OT/1:5	SKA MVO Kalinin
Dizelist Penza	3:2	Metallurg Cherepovets
Torpedo Gorky	3:2	Salavat Yulaev Ufa

=== 1/16 finals ===
Sputnik Nizhny Tagil	1:9	Spartak Moscow
Zvezda Cherbakul	unknown	Dynamo Leningrad
Kautschuk Omsk	2:5	Lokomotiv Moscow
Kristall Elektrostal	2:5	Sibir Novosibirsk
Voskhod Chelyabinsk	(W)	Torpedo Ust-Kamenogorsk
Ermak Angarsk	0:7	SKA Leningrad
Avtomobilist Sverdlovsk	5:4	Progress Glazov
Avtomobilist Alma-Ata	2:5	Dynamo Kiev
Krylya Sovetov Moscow	6:4	SKA MVO Kalinin
Dizelist Penza	1:7	Torpedo Gorky
Dynamo Moscow	6:0	Torpedo Minsk
Metallurg Novokuznetsk	(W)	Molot Perm
SKA Kuibyshev	6:3	Dinamo Riga
Khimik Voskresensk	7:5	Energija Saratov
Torpedo Yaroslavl	3:4	SK Uritskogo Kazan
SKA Novosibirsk	5:9	CSKA Moscow

=== 1/8 finals ===
Spartak Moscow	8:2	Zvezda Cherbakul
Lokomotiv Moscow	4:3	Sibir Novosibirsk
SKA Leningrad	12:2	Voskhod Chelyabinsk
Dynamo Kiew	3:2 OT	Avtomobilist Sverdlovsk
Torpedo Gorki	3:2	Krylya Sovetov Moscow
Dynamo Moscow	8:1	Metallurg Novokuznetsk
Khimik Voskresensk	10:4	SKA Kuibyshev
ZSKA Moskau	7:1	SK Uritskogo Kazan

=== Quarterfinals ===
Spartak Moscow	3:4 OT	Lokomotiv Moscow
SKA Leningrad	8:2	Dynamo Kiev
Torpedo Gorky	5:2	Dynamo Moscow
Khimik Voskresensk	2:6	CSKA Moscow

=== Semifinals ===
Lokomotiv Moscow	3:5	SKA Leningrad
Torpedo Gorky	1:5	CSKA Moscow

=== Final ===
CSKA Moscow	7:1	SKA Leningrad
