= 1973–74 Soviet Cup (ice hockey) =

The 1973–74 Soviet Cup was the 16th edition of the Soviet Cup ice hockey tournament. 29 teams participated in the tournament, which was won by Krylya Sovetov Moscow, who claimed their second title.

== Participating teams ==
Soviet Championship League teams:	Pervaya Liga teams:	Vtoraya Liga teams:	Other teams:
Torpedo Gorky; SKA Leningrad; Dynamo Moscow; Krylya Sovetov Moscow; Spartak Moscow; CSKA Moscow; Dinamo Riga; Traktor Chelyabinsk; Khimik Voskresensk	Yenbek Alma-Ata; Sokol Kiev; SKA MVO Lipetsk; Lokomotiv Moscow; Metallurg Novokuznetsk; Sibir Novosibirsk; Molot Perm; Kristall Saratov; Avtomobilist Sverdlovsk; Salavat Yulaev Ufa; Torpedo Ust-Kamenogorsk	Motor Barnaul; Kristall Elektrostal; Stroitel Karaganda; Torpedo Minsk; Shakhtor Prokopyevsk; Stankostroitel Ryazan	Latvijas Berzs Riga; Vimpel Minsk; Kreenholm Narva

== Tournament ==
=== First round ===
Metallurg Novokuznetsk	4:2	Vimpel Minsk
Molot Perm	6:3	Latvijas Berzs Riga
Torpedo Minsk	6:4	Kristall Elektrostal
Stroitel Karaganda	8:5	Motor Barnaul
Torpedo Ust-Kamenogorsk	5:4	Yenbek Alma-Ata

=== Second round ===
Dinamo Riga	10:6	Stroitel Karaganda
Sibir Novosibirsk	9:4	Shakhtor Prokopyevsk
Salavat Yulaev Ufa	7:2	Metallurg Novokuznetsk
Kristall Saratov	9:2	Kreenholm Narva
Stankostroitel Ryazan	8:3	Sokol Kiev
Torpedo Ust-Kamenogorsk	5:3	SKA MvO Lipetsk
Avtomobilist Sverdlovsk	4:3	Molot Perm
Torpedo Minsk	5:4	Lokomotiv Moscow

=== 1/8 finals ===
CSKA Moscow	8:3	Salavat Yulaev Ufa
Khimik Voskresensk	5:3	Sibir Novosibirsk
SKA Leningrad	4:6	Kristall Saratov
Krylya Sovetov Moscow	(W)	Torpedo Minsk
Dynamo Moscow	5:1	Dinamo Riga
Traktor Chelyabinsk	5:3 OT	Stankostroitel Ryazan
Torpedo Gorky	4:8	Avtomobilist Sverdlovsk
Spartak Moscow	10:6	Torpedo Ust-Kamenogorsk

=== Quarterfinals ===
CSKA Moscow	3:4	Khimik Voskresensk
Kristall Saratov	4:8	Krylya Sovetov Moscow
Dynamo Moscow	5:4	Traktor Chelyabinsk
Avtomobilist Sverdlovsk	3:13	Spartak Moscow

=== Semifinals ===
Khimik Voskresensk	1:5	Krylya Sovetov Moscow
Dynamo Moscow	4:2	Spartak Moscow

=== Final ===
Krylya Sovetov Moscow	4:3	Dynamo Moscow
