= 1969–70 Soviet Cup (ice hockey) =

The 1969–70 Soviet Cup was the 12th edition of the Soviet Cup ice hockey tournament. 24 teams participated in the tournament, which was won by Spartak Moscow, who claimed their first title.

== Participating teams ==
Soviet Championship League teams:	Pervaya Liga teams:
Torpedo Gorky; HK Dynamo Kiev; SKA Leningrad; Dynamo Moscow; Krylya Sovetov Moscow; Lokomotiv Moscow; Spartak Moscow; CSKA Moscow; Sibir Novosibirsk; Avtomobilist Sverdlovsk; Traktor Chelyabinsk; Khimik Voskresensk	Avtomobilist Alma-Ata; Kristall Elektrostal; Torpedo Yaroslavl; SK Uritskogo Kazan; Torpedo Minsk; Metallurg Novokuznetsk; Dizelist Penza; Molot Perm; Kristall Saratov; Zvezda Cherbakul; Salavat Yulaev Ufa; Torpedo Ust-Kamenogorsk

== Tournament ==
=== 1/16 finals ===
Zvezda Cherbakul	5:3	Traktor Chelyabinsk
Molot Perm	4:2	Torpedo Yaroslavl
Metallurg Novokuznetsk	6:3	Kristall Elektrostal
Avtomobilist Alma-Ata	7:6 SO	Torpedo Ust-Kamenogorsk
Salavat Yulaev Ufa	5:2	Sibir Novosibirsk
Torpedo Minsk	3:2	Dynamo Kiev
Torpedo Gorky	6:2	SK Uritskogo Kazan
Kristall Saratov	4:2	Dizelist Penza

=== 1/8 finals ===
Lokomotiv Moscow	9:4	Torpedo Minsk
Spartak Moscow	13:4	Zvezda Cherbakul
Krylya Sovetov Moscow	5:2	Molot-Perm
Khimik Voskresensk	4:2	Avtomobilist Alma-Ata
SKA Leningrad	3:2	Metallurg Novokuznetsk
Dynamo Moscow	5:1	Salavat Yulaev Ufa
Avtomobilist Sverdlovsk	10:5	Kristall Saratov
CSKA Moscow	5:3	Torpedo Gorky

=== Quarterfinals ===
Spartak Moscow	6:2	Krylya Sovetov Moscow
Khimik Voskresensk	4:5 SO	SKA Leningrad
Dynamo Moscow	6:2	Lokomotiv Moscow
Avtomobilist Sverdlovsk	2:9	CSKA Moscow

=== Semifinals ===
Spartak Moscow	10:7	SKA Leningrad
Dynamo Moscow	4:3	CSKA Moscow

=== Final ===
Spartak Moscow	2:1	Dynamo Moscow
