= 1972–73 Soviet Cup (ice hockey) =

Ice hockey tournament

The 1972–73 Soviet Cup was the 15th edition of the Soviet Cup ice hockey tournament. 28 teams participated in the tournament, which was won by CSKA Moscow, who claimed their ninth title.

== Participating teams ==
Soviet Championship League teams:	Pervaya Liga teams:	Vtoraya Liga teams:	Other teams:
Torpedo Gorky; SKA Leningrad; Dynamo Moscow; Krylya Sovetov Moscow; Spartak Moscow; CSKA Moscow; Avtomobilist Sverdlovsk; Traktor Chelyabinsk; Khimik Voskresensk	Yenbek Alma-Ata; SKA MVO Kalinin; Dynamo Kiev; Torpedo Minsk; Lokomotiv Moscow; Metallurg Novokuznetsk; Sibir Novosibirsk; Dizelist Penza; Molot Perm; Dinamo Riga; Kristall Saratov; Salavat Yulaev Ufa	Izhstal Izhevsk; Sputnik Nizhny Tagil; SKA Novosibirsk; Khimik Omsk; Dneprospetsstal Zaporozhe	RVZ Riga; Ekskavator Tallinn

== Tournament ==
=== First round ===
Dizelist Penza	6:2	Torpedo Minsk
Metallurg Novokuznetsk	14:0	Ekskavator Tallinn
Sputnik Nizhny Tagil	7:4	Dneprospetsstal Zaporozhe
Izhstal Izhevsk	6:4	SKA Novosibirsk
SKA MVO Kalinin	7:3	Khimik Omsk

=== Second round ===
Dizelist Penza	8:4	Avtomobilist Sverdlovsk
Dinamo Riga	4:3	Metallurg Novokuznetsk
Sputnik Nizhny Tagil	4:3	Lokomotiv Moscow
Sibir Novosibirsk	4:2	Yenbek Alma-Ata
Molot Perm	9:2	Izhstal Izhevsk
SKA MVO Kalinin	7:2	Kristall Saratov
RVZ Riga	6:3	Salavat Yulaev Ufa

=== 1/8 finals ===
Dinamo Riga	7:4	Dynamo Moscow
Dynamo Kiev	2:7	Traktor Chelyabinsk
Sibir Novosibirsk	3:2	Khimik Voskresensk
Sputnik Nizhny Tagil	2:6	Spartak Moscow
Molot Perm	3:5	Krylya Sovetov Moscow
SKA MVO Kalinin	2:4	SKA Leningrad
RVZ Riga	3:5	Torpedo Gorky
Dizelist Penza	3:10	CSKA Moscow

=== Quarterfinals ===
Dynamo Moscow	2:4	Traktor Chelyabinsk
Sibir Novosibirsk	2:9	Spartak Moscow
Krylya Sovetov Moscow	5:3	SKA Leningrad
Torpedo Gorky	2:7	CSKA Moscow

=== Semifinals ===
Traktor Chelyabinsk	9:4	Spartak Moscow
Krylya Sovetov Moscow	4:5 OT	CSKA Moscow

=== Final ===
CSKA Moscow	6:2	Traktor Chelyabinsk
