= 1975–76 Soviet Cup (ice hockey) =

Soviet Ice Hockey tournament

The 1975–76 Soviet Cup was the 17th edition of the Soviet Cup ice hockey tournament. Dynamo Moscow won the cup for the third time in their history. The cup was divided into four groups, with the top team in each group (top two in Group 2) advancing to the playoffs. Krylya Sovetov Moscow, Spartak Moscow, and CSKA Moscow received byes until the playoffs.

== Group phase ==
=== Group 1 ===
	Club	GP	W	T	L	GF	GA	Pts
1.	Dinamo Riga	8	5	2	1	47	28	12
2.	SKA Leningrad	8	6	0	2	38	32	12
3.	Izhstal Izhevsk	8	3	2	3	47	45	8
4.	Sokol Kiev	8	1	2	5	20	30	4
5.	Lokomotiv Moscow	8	2	0	6	19	38	4

=== Group 2 ===
	Club	GP	W	T	L	GF	GA	Pts
1.	Dynamo Moscow	10	9	1	0	67	23	19
2.	Dizelist Penza	10	6	1	3	40	30	13
3.	Torpedo Gorky	10	5	2	3	53	45	12
4.	Molot Perm	10	2	3	5	32	55	7
5.	SKA Kuibyshev	10	0	5	5	25	40	5
6.	Sputnik Nizhny Tagil	10	1	2	7	29	53	4

=== Group 3 ===
	Club	GP	W	T	L	GF	GA	Pts
1.	Kristall Saratov	8	6	1	1	33	19	13
2.	Salavat Yulaev Ufa	8	5	0	3	33	31	10
3.	Khimik Voskresensk	8	4	1	3	32	25	9
4.	Avtomobilist Sverdlovsk	8	2	0	6	36	47	4
5.	SKA MVO Kalinin	8	2	0	6	26	38	4

=== Group 4 ===
	Club	GP	W	T	L	GF	GA	Pts
1.	Traktor Chelyabinsk	8	6	1	1	50	29	13
2.	Sibir Novosibirsk	8	5	0	3	36	23	10
3.	Torpedo Ust-Kamenogorsk	8	3	0	5	29	40	6
4.	Shinnik Omsk	8	3	0	5	26	35	6
5.	SKA Sverdlovsk	8	1	1	6	22	36	3

== Playoffs ==
=== Quarterfinals ===
Traktor Chelyabinsk	2:6	CSKA Moscow
Dinamo Riga	4:6	Krylya Sovetov Moscow
Kristall Saratov	5:8 OT	Spartak Moscow
Dynamo Moscow	5:1	Dizelist Penza

=== Semifinals ===
Dynamo Moscow	2:1	Spartak Moscow
CSKA Moscow	10:3	Krylya Sovetov Moscow

=== Finale ===
CSKA Moscow	2:3 OT	Dynamo Moscow
