= 1987–88 Soviet Cup (ice hockey) =

The 1987–88 Soviet Cup was the 20th edition of the Soviet Cup ice hockey tournament. 20 teams participated in the tournament, which was won by CSKA Moscow, who claimed their 12th title. The first games of the tournament took place in September 1986, with the final being held in August 1988.

== Participating teams ==
Soviet Championship League teams:	Pervaya Liga teams:
Torpedo Gorky; Izhstal Izhevsk; Torpedo Yaroslavl; Sokol Kiev; SKA Leningrad; Dynamo Moscow; Krylya Sovetov Moscow; Spartak Moscow; CSKA Moscow; Dinamo Riga; Avtomobilist Sverdlovsk; Traktor Chelyabinsk; Torpedo Ust-Kamenogorsk; Khimik Voskresensk	Dynamo Kharkiv; SK Uritskogo Kazan; Sibir Novosibirsk; Kristall Saratov; Torpedo Togliatti; Salavat Yulaev Ufa

== Tournament ==
=== First round ===
Torpedo Togliatti	4:4/3:1	SKA Leningrad
Torpedo Yaroslavl	9:4/3:5	Avtomobilist Sverdlovsk
Traktor Chelyabinsk	1:2/7:2	Kristall Saratov
Krylya Sovetov Moscow	3:5/6:1	Dynamo Kharkiv
Khimik Voskresensk	4:2/2:3 SO	Izhstal Izhevsk
Torpedo Ust-Kamenogorsk	6:3/8:6	Salavat Yulaev Ufa
Torpedo Gorky	5:3/5:3	Sibir Novosibirsk
Dinamo Riga	7:4/2:0	SK Uritskogo Kazan

=== Second round ===
Torpedo Yaroslavl	4:1/5:2	Torpedo Togliatti
Traktor Chelyabinsk	3:1/3:2	Krylya Sovetov Moscow
Torpedo Ust-Kamenogorsk	7:3/3:3	Khimik Voskresensk
Torpedo Gorky	7:6/4:3	Dinamo Riga

=== Quarterfinals ===
CSKA Moscow	6:3/8:2	Torpedo Yaroslavl
Sokol Kiev	3:2/6:3	Traktor Chelyabinsk
Spartak Moscow	7:5/5:4	Torpedo Ust-Kamenogorsk
Dynamo Moscow	5:4/6:3	Torpedo Gorky

=== Semifinals ===
CSKA Moscow	7:3	Sokol Kiev
Dynamo Moscow	2:1	Spartak Moscow

=== Final ===
CSKA Moscow	3:2 OT	Dynamo Moscow
