= 1976–77 Soviet Cup (ice hockey) =

The 1976–77 Soviet Cup was the 18th edition of the Soviet Cup ice hockey tournament. CSKA Moscow won the cup for the 10th time in their history. The cup was divided into four groups, with the top team in each group advancing to the playoffs.

== Group phase ==
=== Group 1 ===
	Club	GP	W	T	L	GF	GA	Pts
1.	Dinamo Riga	5	5	0	0	30	13	10
2.	Khimik Voskresensk	5	3	0	2	23	20	6
3.	Salavat Yulaev Ufa	5	3	0	2	22	14	6
4.	Sibir Novosibirsk	5	1	1	3	21	23	3
5.	Binokor Tashkent	5	1	1	3	20	31	3
6.	SKA MVO Kalinin	5	0	0	5	19	34	0

=== Group 2 ===
	Club	GP	W	T	L	GF	GA	Pts
1.	Dynamo Moscow	5	4	0	1	27	13	8
2.	Dinamo Minsk	5	4	0	1	22	10	8
3.	Krylya Sovetov Moscow	5	3	1	1	23	13	7
4.	Avtomobilist Sverdlovsk	5	1	1	3	24	25	3
5.	Dizelist Penza	5	1	0	4	15	26	2
6.	SK Uritskogo Kazan	5	0	0	5	11	35	0

=== Group 3 ===
	Club	GP	W	T	L	GF	GA	Pts
1.	Spartak Moscow	5	5	0	0	40	22	10
2.	Traktor Chelyabinsk	5	3	0	2	23	15	6
3.	SKA Kuibyshev	5	2	1	2	21	22	5
4.	Lokomotiv Moscow	5	2	0	3	17	24	4
5.	Izhstal Izhevsk	5	1	1	3	21	28	3
6.	Kristall Saratov	5	1	0	4	15	26	2

=== Group 4 ===
	Club	GP	W	T	L	GF	GA	Pts
1.	CSKA Moscow	5	5	0	0	61	12	10
2.	Torpedo Gorky	5	4	0	1	28	23	8
3.	Molot Perm	5	3	0	2	17	24	6
4.	SKA Leningrad	5	2	0	3	22	23	4
5.	Metallurg Cherepovets	5	1	0	4	13	31	2
6.	Sokol Kiev	5	0	0	5	14	42	0

== Playoffs ==
=== Semifinals ===
Dinamo Riga	3:4	Spartak Moscow
CSKA Moscow	6:3	Dynamo Moscow

=== Finale ===
CSKA Moscow	9:5	Spartak Moscow
