= 1989–90 Soviet League season =

Soviet ice hockey season

The 1989–90 Soviet Championship League season was the 44th season of the Soviet Championship League, the top level of ice hockey in the Soviet Union. 16 teams participated in the league, and Dynamo Moscow won the championship.

== First round ==
| | Club | GP | W | T | L | GF | GA | Pts |
|---|---|---|---|---|---|---|---|---|
| 1. | Khimik Voskresensk | 30 | 23 | 4 | 3 | 129 | 58 | 50 |
| 2. | Dynamo Moscow | 30 | 21 | 4 | 5 | 126 | 61 | 46 |
| 3. | CSKA Moscow | 30 | 22 | 2 | 6 | 120 | 63 | 46 |
| 4. | Dinamo Riga | 30 | 17 | 4 | 9 | 93 | 64 | 38 |
| 5. | Krylya Sovetov Moscow | 30 | 13 | 8 | 9 | 98 | 90 | 34 |
| 6. | Torpedo Yaroslavl | 30 | 16 | 2 | 12 | 93 | 86 | 34 |
| 7. | Sokol Kiev | 30 | 13 | 7 | 10 | 90 | 86 | 33 |
| 8. | Spartak Moscow | 30 | 14 | 2 | 14 | 122 | 104 | 30 |
| 9. | Dinamo Minsk | 30 | 12 | 5 | 13 | 94 | 92 | 29 |
| 10. | Torpedo Gorky | 30 | 12 | 4 | 14 | 65 | 86 | 28 |
| 11. | Traktor Chelyabinsk | 30 | 11 | 5 | 14 | 71 | 94 | 27 |
| 12. | SK Uritskogo Kazan | 30 | 10 | 4 | 16 | 67 | 99 | 24 |
| 13. | Avtomobilist Sverdlovsk | 30 | 8 | 3 | 19 | 83 | 123 | 19 |
| 14. | SKA Leningrad | 30 | 6 | 3 | 21 | 78 | 136 | 15 |
| 15. | Torpedo Ust-Kamenogorsk | 30 | 5 | 5 | 20 | 80 | 123 | 15 |
| 16. | Dinamo Kharkiv | 30 | 3 | 6 | 21 | 65 | 109 | 12 |

== Final round ==
| | Club | GP | W | T | L | GF | GA | Pts |
|---|---|---|---|---|---|---|---|---|
| 1. | Dynamo Moscow | 48 | 35 | 5 | 8 | 201 | 106 | 75 |
| 2. | CSKA Moscow | 48 | 33 | 6 | 9 | 200 | 106 | 72 |
| 3. | Khimik Voskresensk | 48 | 32 | 7 | 9 | 192 | 107 | 71 |
| 4. | Dinamo Riga | 48 | 26 | 7 | 15 | 148 | 117 | 59 |
| 5. | Sokol Kiev | 48 | 23 | 8 | 17 | 154 | 152 | 54 |
| 6. | Krylya Sovetov Moscow | 48 | 19 | 12 | 17 | 143 | 153 | 50 |
| 7. | Torpedo Yaroslavl | 48 | 21 | 6 | 21 | 145 | 146 | 48 |
| 8. | Spartak Moscow | 48 | 22 | 4 | 22 | 182 | 157 | 48 |
| 9. | Torpedo Gorky | 48 | 17 | 5 | 26 | 114 | 156 | 39 |
| 10. | Dinamo Minsk | 48 | 13 | 6 | 29 | 138 | 177 | 32 |

== Relegation ==
| | Club | GP | W | T | L | GF | GA | Pts |
|---|---|---|---|---|---|---|---|---|
| 1. | Torpedo Ust-Kamenogorsk | 36 | 24 | 2 | 10 | 165 | 117 | 50 |
| 2. | SK Uritskogo Kazan | 36 | 20 | 5 | 11 | 125 | 105 | 45 |
| 3. | Traktor Chelyabinsk | 36 | 20 | 4 | 12 | 126 | 111 | 44 |
| 4. | Avtomobilist Sverdlovsk | 36 | 18 | 5 | 13 | 143 | 120 | 41 |
| 5. | SKA Leningrad | 36 | 18 | 5 | 13 | 134 | 114 | 41 |
| 6. | Kristall Elektrostal | 36 | 17 | 4 | 15 | 136 | 127 | 38 |
| 7. | Salavat Yulaev Ufa | 36 | 15 | 5 | 16 | 109 | 117 | 35 |
| 8. | Dinamo Kharkiv | 36 | 13 | 5 | 18 | 92 | 110 | 31 |
| 9. | Kristall Saratov | 36 | 6 | 9 | 21 | 104 | 147 | 21 |
| 10. | Awangard Omsk | 36 | 6 | 2 | 28 | 93 | 159 | 14 |
