= List of Sokil Kyiv seasons =

This is a list of seasons completed by the Sokil Kiev professional ice hockey club. This list documents the records and playoff results for all seasons Sokil completed in the Soviet Hockey League and the Belarusian Extraleague.

== Soviet League (1963-1992) ==
| Top Division | Second Division | League leader | Division leader |

Note: GP = Games played, W = Wins, L = Losses, T = Ties, GF = Goals for, GA = Goals against, Pts = Points

| Season | GP | W | L | T | GF | GA | PTS | Finish | Soviet Cup Playoffs |
| 1963-64 | 40 | 16 | 13 | 11 | 140 | 118 | 43 | 6th of 11 | No playoffs held |
| 1964-65 | 40 | 29 | 8 | 3 | 187 | 88 | 61 | 2nd of 22 | No playoffs held |
| 1965-66 | 36 | 8 | 25 | 3 | 76 | 144 | 19 | 9th of 10 | Bye for 64ths Won 32nds (Dynamo Bryansk); Lost in 16ths (Spartak Sverdlovsk) |
| 1966-67 | 44 | 11 | 25 | 8 | 122 | 207 | 30 | 9th of 12 | Bye for 32nds Won 16ths (Glazov Progress); Lost 8ths (CSKA Moscow) |
| 1967-68 | 44 | 14 | 27 | 3 | 130 | 180 | 31 | 9th of 12 | Won 32nds (Shakhtar Prokopyevsk); Won 16ths (Avtomobilist Almaty); Won 8ths (Avtomobilist Sverdlovsk); Lost Quarterfinals (SKA Leningrad) |
| 1968-69 | 58 | 29 | 18 | 11 | 196 | 184 | 69 | 12th of 24 | Bye for 32nds Lost 16ths (Salavat Yulaev Ufa) |
| 1969-70 | 44 | 5 | 35 | 4 | 125 | 272 | 14 | 12th of 12 | Lost in 16ths (Torpedo Minsk) |
| 1970-71 | 48 | 20 | 24 | 4 | 198 | 210 | 44 | 6th of 13 | Bye for 32nds Won 16ths (Titan Berezniki); Lost 8ths (Khimik Voskresensk) |
| 1971-72 | 48 | 22 | 19 | 7 | 192 | 178 | 51 | 5th of 13 | Bye for 32nds Lost 16ths (Dinamo Riga) |
| 1972-73 | 48 | 25 | 20 | 3 | 190 | 181 | 53 | 4th of 13 | Bye for 32nds and 16ths Lost 8ths (Traktor Chelyabinsk) |
| 1973-74 | 48 | 20 | 23 | 5 | 168 | 173 | 45 | 9th of 13 | Bye for 32nds Lost in 16ths (Stankostroitel Ryazan) |
| 1974-75 | 52 | 29 | 17 | 6 | 213 | 169 | 64 | 3rd of 14 | No playoffs held |
| 1975-76 | 52 | 23 | 22 | 7 | 183 | 153 | 53 | 6th of 14 | DNQ past Group-stage |
| 1976-77 | 52 | 20 | 21 | 11 | 193 | 175 | 51 | 7th of 14 | No playoffs held |
| 1977-78 | 52 | 35 | 12 | 5 | 271 | 150 | 75 | 2nd of 14 | DNQ past Group-stage |
| 1978-79 | 44 | 16 | 26 | 2 | 127 | 155 | 34 | 9th of 12 | Won Group-stage; Won Quarterfinals (Salavat Yulaev Ufa); Lost Semifinals (CSKA Moscow) |
| 1979-80 | 44 | 14 | 18 | 12 | 146 | 161 | 40 | 6th of 12 | No playoffs held |
| 1980-81 | 44 | 20 | 19 | 5 | 151 | 152 | 45 | 6th of 12 | No playoffs held |
| 1981-82 | 44 | 20 | 19 | 5 | 154 | 149 | 45 | 5th of 12 | No playoffs held |
| 1982-83 | 44 | 22 | 17 | 5 | 163 | 138 | 49 | 4th of 12 | No playoffs held |
| 1983-84 | 44 | 20 | 18 | 6 | 156 | 142 | 46 | 5th of 12 | No playoffs held |
| 1984-85 | 40 | 18 | 17 | 5 | 144 | 151 | 41 | 3rd of 12 | No playoffs held |
| 1985-86 | 40 | 18 | 13 | 9 | 172 | 139 | 45 | 4th of 12 | No playoffs held |
| 1986-87 | 40 | 12 | 26 | 2 | 130 | 175 | 26 | 9th of 12 | No playoffs held |
| 1987-88 | 44 | 19 | 18 | 7 | 184 | 164 | 45 | 6th of 14 | Won in Quarterfinals 2-0, (Traktor Chelyabinsk); Lost in Semifinals 0-2, (CSKA Moscow) |
| 1988-89 | 36 | 16 | 9 | 11 | 141 | 124 | 41 | 5th of 14 | Lost in Quarterfinals 1-2, (Dynamo Moscow) |
| 1989-90 | 48 | 23 | 17 | 8 | 154 | 152 | 53 | 5th of 16 | No playoffs held |
| 1990-91 | 46 | 15 | 18 | 13 | 151 | 149 | 43 | 8th of 15 | No playoffs held |
| 1991-92 | 30 | 7 | 22 | 1 | 101 | 139 | 15 | 15th of 16 | DNQ |
| Top Div. | 814 | 307 | 387 | 120 | 2723 | 3077 | 731 | 12 playoff appearances | |
| 2nd Div. | 480 | 239 | 179 | 62 | 1935 | 1595 | 540 | Earned promotion twice (1965, 1978) | |

1. Finished first portion of season 10th overall of 12. Teams placed 6-12 relegated to complete season with top 12 teams from Class A2. Group finish 6th of 18
2. Playoff entry was decided by Olympic style round-robin play between 4 divisions.

== International Hockey League (1992-1996) ==
Note: GP = Games played, W = Wins, L = Losses, T = Ties, GF = Goals for, GA = Goals against, Pts = Points

| Season | GP | W | L | T | GF | GA | PTS | Finish | Playoffs |
| 1992-93 | 42 | 18 | 17 | 7 | 141 | 119 | 43 | 14th of 24 | Lost 8ths 1-2 (Traktor Chelyabinsk) |
| 1993-94 | 46 | 18 | 20 | 8 | 120 | 143 | 44 | 17th of 24 | No playoffs held |
| 1994-95 | 52 | 12 | 30 | 10 | 103 | 152 | 34 | 24th of 28 | DNQ |
| 1995-96 | 52 | 16 | 23 | 13 | 106 | 135 | 45 | 21st of 28 | DNQ |
| IHL | 192 | 64 | 90 | 38 | 470 | 549 | 166 | 1 playoff appearance | |

3. 1st, Second Division / 7th, Western Conference
4. 13th, Western Conference

== Eastern European Hockey League (1996-2004) ==
| League leader | Division leader | Champion |

Note: GP = Games played, W = Wins, OW = Overtime wins, T = Ties, OL = Overtime losses, L = Losses, GF = Goals for, GA = Goals against, Pts = Points

| Season | GP | W | OW | T | OL | L | GF | GA | PTS | Finish | Playoffs |
| 1996-97 | 32 | 27 | — | 3 | — | 2 | 198 | 42 | 57 | 1st of 9 | Won in Quarterfinals 2-0, (Energy Elektrenai); Won in Semifinals 2-0, (Neman Grodno); Lost in Finals 2-3 (Riga Juniors) |
| 1997-98 | 46 | 39 | — | 3 | — | 4 | 213 | 56 | 81 | 1st of 10 | No playoffs held |
| 1998-99 | 44 | 32 | — | 5 | — | 7 | 190 | 73 | 74 | 1st of 8 | No playoffs held |
| 1999-20 | 40 | 27 | — | 8 | — | 5 | 175 | 71 | 62 | 1st of 8 | Won in Quarterfinals 2-0, (HC Kyiv); Won in Semifinals 3-1, (Nemen Grodno); Lost in Finals 3-0, (Berkut Kyiv) |
| 2000-01 | 32 | 19 | — | 6 | — | 7 | 129 | 73 | 44 | 3rd of 9 | Lost in Quarterfinals 0-2, (Liepājas Metalurgs) |
| 2001-02 | 32 | 11 | 0 | 3 | 2 | 16 | 83 | 100 | 38 | 8th of 9 | Lost in Quarterfinals 0-2, (Liepājas Metalurgs) |
| 2002-03 | 36 | 18 | 5 | | 6 | 7 | 100 | 69 | 70 | 3rd of 10 | No playoffs held |
| 2003-04 | 32 | 17 | 0 | 0 | 1 | 14 | 103 | 98 | 51 | 4th of 9 | 2nd in RR Play |
| EEHL | 294 | 190 | 5 | 28 | 9 | 62 | 1191 | 582 | 477 | 2 EEHL championships | |

5. Energy Elektrenai forfeited game 2

== Belarusian Open League (2004-2007) ==
Note: GP = Games played, W = Wins, OW = Overtime wins, T = Ties, OL = Overtime losses, L = Losses, GF = Goals for, GA = Goals against, Pts = Points

| Season | GP | W | OW | T | OL | L | GF | GA | PTS | Finish | Playoffs |
| 2004-05 | 44 | 24 | 2 | 5 | 1 | 12 | 132 | 95 | 82 | 3rd of 12 | Won in Quarterfinals 3-2, (HC Gomel); Lost in Semifinals 2-4, (Keramin Minsk); Loses Relegation 0-2, (Khimvolokno) |
| 2005-06 | 55 | 31 | 1 | 6 | 2 | 15 | 145 | 108 | 103 | 4th of 12 | Lost in Quarterfinals 3-0, (Khimvolokno) |
| 2006-07 | 50 | 9 | 0 | 5 | 2 | 34 | 94 | 203 | 34 | 10th of 12 | DNQ |
| BLR | 149 | 64 | 3 | 16 | 5 | 61 | 371 | 406 | 219 | 2 playoff appearances | |

== Russian Major League (2007-2009) ==
Note: GP = Games played, W = Wins, OW = Overtime wins, SW = Shootout wins, SL = Shootout losses, OL = Overtime losses, L = Losses, GF = Goals for, GA = Goals against, Pts = Points

| Season | GP | W | OW | SW | OL | SL | L | GF | GA | PTS | Finish | Playoffs |
| 2007-08 | 60 | 27 | 2 | 4 | 4 | 5 | 18 | 201 | 155 | 102 | 7th of 30 | Lost in Preliminary round, 0-3 (Kazakhmys Karaganda) |
| 2008-09 | 66 | 45 | 3 | 5 | 1 | 0 | 12 | 239 | 134 | 152 | 4th of 33 | Bye in Preliminary round Won Secondary round 3-1 (Ryazan); Lost in Quarterfinals 3-1, (Yugra Khanty-Mansiysk) |
| RUS-2 | 126 | 72 | 5 | 9 | 5 | 5 | 30 | 440 | 289 | 254 | 2 playoff appearance | |
