= 1956–57 Soviet League season =

Soviet ice hockey season

The 1956–57 Soviet Championship League season was the 11th season of the Soviet Championship League, the top level of ice hockey in the Soviet Union. 16 teams participated in the league, and Krylya Sovetov Moscow won the championship.

== Standings ==
	Club	GP	W	T	L	GF	GA	Pts
1.	Krylya Sovetov Moscow	30	29	0	1	186	47	58
2.	CSK MO Moscow	30	28	1	1	223	37	57
3.	Dynamo Moscow	30	25	2	3	146	48	52
4.	Avangard Chelyabinsk	30	19	3	8	116	88	41
5.	Dom ofizerov Leningrad	30	16	1	13	110	98	33
6.	Spartak Moscow	30	14	3	13	78	89	31
7.	Lokomotiv Moscow	30	12	5	13	102	124	29
8.	KKM Elektrostal	30	11	3	16	71	108	25
9.	Dynamo Novosibirsk	30	10	4	16	100	138	24
10.	Khimik Voskresensk	30	11	0	19	86	132	22
11.	Avangard Leningrad	30	10	2	18	76	125	22
12.	Daugava Riga	30	8	5	17	67	80	21
13.	Torpedo Gorky	30	9	3	18	79	128	21
14.	Burevestnik Chelyabinsk	30	7	4	19	90	127	18
15.	Spartak Sverdlovsk	30	7	2	21	74	145	16
16.	Burevestnik Moscow	30	3	4	23	65	155	10
