= 1953–54 Klass B season =

The 1953–54 Klass B season was the fourth season of the Klass B, the second level of ice hockey in the Soviet Union. Seven teams participated in the final tournament, and Dynamo Novosibirsk won the championship. Novosibirsk and Torpedo Gorky were promoted to the Soviet Championship League.

== Final tournament ==
	Club	GP	W	T	L	GF	GA	Pts
1.	Dynamo Novosibirsk	12	11	0	1	80	26	22
2.	Torpedo Gorky	12	10	1	1	80	30	21
3.	Dünamo Tallinn	12	4	3	5	41	45	11
4.	Spartak Sverdlovsk	12	4	3	5	49	57	11
5.	SK im. Sverdlova Molotov	12	3	1	8	37	78	7
6.	Medik Leningrad	12	3	0	9	43	68	6
7.	SK im. Stalina Molotov	12	2	2	8	44	70	6
