= 1950–51 Soviet Cup (ice hockey) =

First Soviet ice hockey cup in 1951

The 1950–51 Soviet Cup was the first edition of the Soviet Cup ice hockey tournament. 21 teams participated in the tournament, which was won by Krylya Sovetov Moscow.

== Tournament ==
=== First round ===
Torpedo Gorky	2:6	Dynamo Leningrad
Lokomotiv Kharkiv	1:9	Dünamo Tallinn
Spartak Petropavlovsk	0:16	CDKA Moscow
Spartak Moscow	15:1	Spartak Vilnius
Khimik Elektrostal	4:9	Daugava Riga

=== 1/8 finals ===
CDKA Moscow II	3:4	Krylya Sovetov Moscow
Dzerzhinets Leningrad	2:6	Dzerzhinets Chelyabinsk
Dynamo Sverdlovsk	5:11	Dynamo Leningrad
Dünamo Tallinn	2:10	Dynamo Moscow
CDKA Moscow	8:5	Spartak Moscow
Daugava Riga	1:3	Spartak Minsk
Spartak Tallinn	0:15	ODO Leningrad
WEF Riga	0:19	WWS MWO Moskau

=== Quarterfinals ===
Krylya Sovetov Moscow	9:0	Dzerhinets Chelyabinsk
Dynamo Leningrad	5:8	Dynamo Moscow
CDKA Moscow	8:1	Spartak Minsk
ODO Leningrad	3:6	VVS MVO Moscow

=== Semifinals ===
'Krylya Sovetov Moscow	4:3	Dynamo Moscow
CDKA Moscow	0:3	VVS MVO Moscow

=== Final ===
Krylya Sovetov Moscow	4:3	VVS MVO Moscow
