= 1988–89 Soviet League Cup =

The 1988–89 Soviet League Cup was the 21st and final edition of the Soviet Cup ice hockey tournament. Unlike previous editions, the 1989 competition was held as a League Cup, with only the 10 best teams from the Soviet Championship League being eligible to participate. Krylya Sovetov Moscow won the cup for the third time in their history. Six teams participated in the preliminary round, with Dynamo Moscow, Krylya Sovetov Moscow, CSKA Moscow, and Khimik Voskresensk receiving byes until the knockout round.

== Preliminary round ==
	Club	GP	W	T	L	GF	GA	Pts
1.	Sokol Kiev	10	6	1	3	46	40	13
2.	Avtomobilist Sverdlovsk	10	6	0	4	49	29	12
3.	Traktor Chelyabinsk	10	5	0	5	28	25	10
4.	Dinamo Riga	10	3	3	4	28	34	9
5.	SKA Leningrad	10	4	1	5	27	37	9
6.	Spartak Moscow	10	3	1	6	31	44	7

== Knockout round ==
=== Quarterfinals ===
- Sokol Kiev - Dynamo Moscow 1:2 (4:5, 5:3, 5:9)
- Avtomobilist Sverdlovsk - Krylya Sovetov Moscow 1:2 (6:3, 5:6, 6:9)

=== Semifinals ===
- Dynamo Moscow - CSKA Moscow 2:0 (3:2, 4:3)
- Krylya Sovetov Moscow - Khimik Voskresensk 2:0 (6:4, 2:1 OT)

=== Final ===
- Krylya Sovetov Moscow - Dynamo Moscow 2:0 (4:2, 4:1)
