= 1978–79 Soviet Cup (ice hockey) =

The 1978–79 Soviet Cup was the 19th edition of the Soviet Cup ice hockey tournament. CSKA Moscow won the cup for the 11th time in their history. The cup was divided into four groups, with the top team in each group advancing to the playoffs. CSKA Moscow and Dynamo Moscow received byes until the playoff semifinals.

== Group phase ==
=== Group 1 ===
	Club	GP	Pts
1.	Spartak Moscow	3	5
2.	Khimik Voskresensk	3	4
3.	Lokomotiv Moscow	3	3
4.	Shinnik Omsk	3	0

=== Group 2 ===
	Club	GP	Pts
1.	Sokol Kiev	3	6
2.	Traktor Chelyabinsk	3	4
3.	Dinamo Minsk	3	2
4.	Izhstal Izhevsk	3	0

=== Group 3 ===
	Club	GP	Pts
1.	Salavat Yulaev Ufa	3	5
2.	Krylya Sovetov Moscow	3	5
3.	Binokor Tashkent	3	2
4.	Molot Perm	3	0

=== Group 4 ===
	Club	GP	Pts
1.	Dinamo Riga	3	6
2.	SK Uritskogo Kazan	3	3
3.	Torpedo Gorky	3	2
4.	Dizelist Penza	3	1

== Playoffs ==
=== Quarterfinals ===
Sokol Kiev	2:0	Salavat Yulaev Ufa
Dinamo Riga	6:3	Spartak Moscows

=== Semifinals ===
CSKA Moscow	5:1	Sokol Kiev
Dynamo Moscow	4:3	Dinamo Riga

=== Final ===
CSKA Moscow	4:2	Dynamo Moscow
