= 1954–55 Soviet League season =

Soviet ice hockey season

The 1954–55 Soviet Championship League season was the ninth season of the Soviet Championship League, the top level of ice hockey in the Soviet Union. Ten teams participated in the league, and CSK MO Moscow won the championship.

== Standings ==
	Club	GP	W	T	L	GF	GA	Pts
1.	CSK MO Moscow	18	17	0	1	142	16	34
2.	Krylya Sovetov Moscow	18	15	0	3	143	26	30
3.	Dynamo Moscow	18	14	2	2	111	27	30
4.	Avangard Chelyabinsk	18	8	1	9	59	73	17
5.	Daugava Riga	18	6	4	8	42	57	16
6.	KKM Elektrostal	18	5	3	10	48	96	13
7.	ODO Leningrad	18	6	0	12	55	85	12
8.	Avangard Leningrad	18	4	4	10	41	108	12
9.	Dynamo Novosibirsk	18	3	3	12	44	125	9
10.	Torpedo Gorky	18	3	1	14	46	118	7
