= 1960–61 Soviet Cup (ice hockey) =

The 1960–61 Soviet Cup was the seventh edition of the Soviet Cup ice hockey tournament, and the first since 1956. 19 teams participated in the tournament, which was won by CSKA Moscow for the fourth consecutive season.

== Tournament ==
The tournament was set up in five rounds, with six teams paired off in the opening round to advance and the other 13 pre-qualified to the round of 16. Two or three matches were played between pairings in the different rounds of play, with all opening round matches decided by two meetings. Four teams were eliminated from the tournament by failing to play their opponents.

=== First round ===
In the first round, Spartak Omsk defeated Metallurg Novokuznetsk, Spartak Sverdlovsk defeated LIIHT Leningrad, and Kirovez Leningrad defeated Daugava Riga to advance to the round of 16.

=== 1/8 finals ===
In the round of 16, Torpedo Gorky beat Spartak Moscow, Traktor Chelyabinsk advanced automatically due to Molot Perm not participating, and SKA Kalinin defeated Krylya Sovetov Moscow. Dynamo Novosibirsk beat Spartak Omsk, who had qualified from the first round play-in, and Kirowez Leningrad advanced by default over the non-participating Spartak Sverdlovsk. Dynamo Moscow lost to Lokomotiv Moscow, SKA Leningrad to Gorod Elektrostal, and Lhimik Voskresensk to the eventual champions CSKA Moscow.

=== Quarterfinals ===
In the quarter finals, Torpedo Gorky and SKA Kalinin advanced over the non-participating Traktor Chelyabinsk and Dynamo Novosibirsk respectively, while Kirovez Leningrad lost to Lokomotiv Moscow, and Gorod Elektrostal lost to champions CSKA Moscow.

=== Semifinals ===
In the semifinal matchups, Torpedo Gorky beat SKA Kalinin in three matches, 3-4, 4-3, 6-4, while Lokomotiv Moscow lost to CSKA Moscow in two, 2-7 and 1-6.

=== Final ===
In the finals, CSKA Moscow defeated Torpedo Gorky in three, 5-1, 15-4, 6-3.
