= 1952–53 Soviet Cup (ice hockey) =

The 1952–53 Soviet Cup was the third edition of the Soviet Cup ice hockey tournament. 25 teams participated in the tournament, which was won by Dynamo Moscow.

== Regular season ==
=== 1/16 Finals ===
Dynamo Moscow	8:3	SK im. Stalina Molotov
Dynamo Tallinn	6:2	Dzerzhinets Chelyabinsk
VVS MVO Moscow	19:1	Dinamo Riga
Daugava Riga	6:4	Dynamo Novosibirsk
Dynamo Sverdlovsk	9:0	Institut im. Lesgafta Leningrad
Krylya Sovetov Moscow	31:0	Kalev Tallinn
Spartak Moscow	12:4	VVS MVO Moscow II
Dynamo Leningrad	10:2	Zalgiris Kaunas
CDSA Moscow	22:0	Nauka Minsk
ODO Leningrad	7:4	Torpedo Gorky

=== 1/8 Finals ===
Dinamo Minsk	1:2	Spartak Minsk
Inkaras Kaunas	1:16	Dynamo Moscow
Daugava Riga	6:0	Dynamo Sverdlovsk
VVS MVO Moscow	6:0	Dynamo Tallinn
Spartak Moscow	7:10	Dynamo Leningrad
CDSA Moscow	7:3	ODO Leningrad
Krylya Sovetov Moscow	4:1	ODO Novosibirsk
Khimik Elektrostal	(W)*

=== Quarterfinals ===
Spartak Minsk	1:7	Dynamo Moscow
Daugava Riga	2:5	VVS MVO Moscow
Dynamo Leningrad	2:7	CDSA Moscow
Krylya Sovetov Moscow	14:3	Khimik Elektrostal

=== Semifinals ===
Dynamo Moscow	3:2	VVS MVO Moscow
CDSA Moscow	6:0	Krylya Sovetov Moscow

=== Final ===
Dynamo Moscow	3:2	CDSA Moscow

(* Automatic victory because opponent did not participate.)
