= Kartsev =

Kartsev (Russian: Карцев) is a Russian masculine surname, its feminine counterpart is Kartseva. Notable people with the surname include:

- Aleksandr Kartsev (born 2001), Russian artistic gymnast
- Denis Kartsev (born 1976), Russian ice hockey winger
- Leonid N. Kartsev (1922–2013), Russian tank designer
- Vasili Kartsev (1920–1987), Russian football player
