= 1995–96 IHL (Russia) season =

1995–96 IHL season
- League: International Hockey League
- Sport: Ice hockey
- Number of teams: 28

Regular season
- Season champions: Metallurg Magnitogorsk

Final Round
- Champions: HC Lada Togliatti

Cup Playoffs

Finals
- Champions: HC Dynamo Moscow
- Runners-up: Metallurg Magnitogorsk

IHL seasons
- ← 1994–95 1996–97 →

The 1995–96 International Hockey League season was the fourth and last season of the International Hockey League, the top level of ice hockey in Russia. The league was replaced by the Russian Superleague for 1996-97. 28 teams participated in the league, and HK Dynamo Moscow won the Cup of IHL by defeating HK Metallurg Magnitogorsk in the final. But the champion was the team "HC Lada Togliatti".

== Regular season ==
=== Western Conference ===
	Club	GP	W	T	L	GF	GA	Pts
1.	HK Dynamo Moscow	26	17	3	6	84	50	37
2.	Torpedo Yaroslavl	26	15	4	7	83	58	34
3.	Severstal Cherepovets	26	15	4	7	82	64	34
4.	Ak Bars Kazan	26	12	9	5	68	54	33
5.	Kristall Elektrostal	26	14	4	8	67	51	32
6.	SKA St. Petersburg	26	12	6	8	73	58	30
7.	HK Spartak Moscow	26	11	8	7	65	61	30
8.	Krylya Sovetov Moscow	26	14	2	10	82	62	30
9.	Torpedo Nizhny Novgorod	26	13	0	13	72	61	26
10.	Khimik Voskresensk	26	10	1	15	48	62	21
11.	HK CSKA Moscow	26	8	5	13	64	72	21
12.	HK Sokol Kiev	26	5	6	15	47	76	16
13.	Neftekhimik Nizhnekamsk	26	5	5	16	60	90	15
14.	Tivali Minsk	26	1	3	22	43	119	5

=== Eastern Conference ===
	Club	GP	W	T	L	GF	GA	Pts
1.	HK Metallurg Magnitogorsk	26	20	3	3	77	42	43
2.	HK Avangard Omsk	26	19	4	3	102	38	42
3.	Salavat Yulaev Ufa	26	19	3	4	101	45	41
4.	HK Lada Togliatti	26	15	2	9	90	49	32
5.	Molot-Prikamie Perm	26	14	3	9	79	60	31
6.	Kristall Saratov	26	14	2	10	77	70	30
7.	Rubin Tyumen	26	11	5	10	74	77	27
8.	Metallurg Novokuznetsk	26	10	3	13	73	82	23
9.	Torpedo Ust-Kamenogorsk	26	9	2	15	66	93	20
10.	Avtomobilist Yekaterinburg	26	8	3	15	71	89	19
11.	CSK VVS Samara	26	6	6	14	58	81	18
12.	HK Traktor Chelyabinsk	26	5	7	14	49	70	17
13.	Bulat Karaganda	26	4	5	17	59	121	13
14.	HK Sibir Novosibirsk	26	2	4	20	53	112	8

== Second round ==
=== Final round ===
	Club	GP	W	T	L	GF	GA	Pts (Bonus)
1.	HK Lada Togliatti	26	21	2	3	122	50	48 (4)
2.	HK Dynamo Moscow	26	18	3	5	79	53	46 (7)
3.	HK Avangard Omsk	26	16	4	6	87	54	42 (6)
4.	Salavat Yulaev Ufa	26	17	3	6	80	46	42 (5)
5.	HK Metallurg Magnitogorsk	26	14	2	10	87	66	37 (7)
6.	Torpedo Yaroslavl	26	15	1	10	70	55	36 (7)
7.	Ak Bars Kazan	26	14	4	8	68	56	36 (4)
8.	Kristall Elektrostal	26	10	4	12	73	76	27 (3)
9.	Severstal Cherepovets	26	7	3	16	62	83	22 (5)
10.	SKA St. Petersburg	26	9	2	15	64	67	22 (1)
11.	Rubin Tyumen	26	7	3	16	63	104	18 (1)
12.	Molot-Prikamie Perm	26	6	2	18	74	95	17 (3)
13.	Kristall Saratov	26	6	1	19	55	127	15 (2)
14.	HK Spartak Moscow	26	5	0	21	69	117	11 (1)

=== Qualification round ===
	Club	GP	W	T	L	GF	GA	Pts (Bonus)
15.	HK CSKA Moscow	26	19	3	4	85	32	45 (4)
16.	Torpedo Nizhny Novgorod	26	17	4	5	74	43	44 (6)
17.	Krylya Sovetov Moscow	26	18	0	8	89	41	43 (7)
18.	Khimik Voskresensk	26	15	2	9	74	66	37 (5)
19.	Avtomobilist Yekaterinburg	26	15	1	10	70	55	36 (5)
20.	Metallurg Novokuznetsk	26	13	2	11	67	64	35 (7)
21.	HK Sokol Kiev	26	11	7	8	59	59	32 (3)
22.	Torpedo Ust-Kamenogorsk	26	11	3	12	84	84	31 (6)
23.	HK Traktor Chelyabinsk	26	10	4	12	49	42	27 (3)
24.	HK Sibir Novosibirsk	26	12	1	13	70	72	26 (1)
25.	Neftekhimik Nizhnekamsk	26	10	3	13	58	65	25 (2)
26.	CSK VVS Samara	26	9	1	16	50	77	23 (4)
27.	Bulat Karaganda	26	4	0	22	62	124	10 (2)
28.	Tivali Minsk	26	2	1	23	39	106	6 (1)

== Playoffs ==
First round
1	HK Lada Togliatti	2
16	Torpedo Nizhny Novgorod	0
8	Kristall Elektrostal	0
9	Severstal Cherepovets	2
5	HK Metallurg Magnitogorsk	2
12	Molot-Prikamie Perm	0
4	Salavat Yulaev Ufa	2
13	Kristall Saratov	0
7	Ak Bars Kazan	2
10	SKA St. Petersburg	0
2	HK Dynamo Moscow	2
15	HK CSKA Moscow	1
6	Torpedo Yaroslavl	1
11	Rubin Tyumen	2
3	HK Avangard Omsk	1
14	HK Spartak Moscow	2

Quarterfinals
1	HK Lada Togliatti	2
9	Severstal Cherepovets	0
5	HK Metallurg Magnitogorsk	2
4	Salavat Yulaev Ufa	0
7	Ak Bars Kazan	1
2	HK Dynamo Moscow	2
11	Rubin Tyumen	2
14	HK Spartak Moscow	1

Semifinals
1	HK Lada Togliatti	0
5	HK Metallurg Magnitogorsk	2
2	HK Dynamo Moscow	2
11	Rubin Tyumen	1

Final
O1	HK Metallurg Magnitogorsk	1
W2	HK Dynamo Moscow	3
