= 1953–54 Soviet Cup (ice hockey) =

The 1953–54 Soviet Cup was the fourth edition of the Soviet cup ice hockey tournament. 24 teams participated in the tournament, which was won by CDSA Moscow.

== Tournament ==
=== First round ===
Lokomotiv Moscow	7:4	SK Stalina Molotov
Khimik Voskresensk	3:9	KKM Elektrostal
Gorod Kiev	0:2	Torpedo Gorky
Medik Leningrad	8:3	Medik Minsk
ODO Riga	4:11	Daugava Riga

=== Second round ===
Avangard Chelyabinsk	4:3	Dynamo Nowosibirsk
Dynamo Sverdlovsk	6:4	Spartak Sverdlovsk
Avangard Leningrad	3:1	Dynamo Tallinn
SK Sverdlova Molotov	1:4	Lokomotiv Moscow
KKM Elektrostal	8:5	Torpedo Gorky
Medik Leningrad	4:11	Daugava Riga
Tallinna Kalev	11:3	Spartak Vilnius

=== Third round ===
Avangard Chelyabinsk	7:2	Dynamo Sverdlovsk
Dynamo Leningrad	10:0	Avangard Leningrad
KKM Elektrostal	5:3	Lokomotiv Moscow
Daugava Riga	30:2	Kalev Tallinn

=== Quarterfinals ===
Avangard Chelyabinsk	1:6	Krylya Sovetov Moscow
Dynamo Leningrad	3:4	ODO Leningrad
KKM Elektrostal	2:4	Dynamo Moscow
Daugava Riga	2:5	CDSA Moscow

=== Semifinals ===
Krylya Sovetov Moscow	6:0	ODO Leningrad
Dynamo Moscow	1:5	CDSA Moscow

=== Final ===
March 21, 1954	CDSA Moscow	4:3 OT annulled	Krylya Sovetov Moscow	Moscow
March 22, 1954	CDSA Moscow; Dimitri Ukolov; Ivan Tregubov; Nikolai Sologubov	3:2	Krylya Sovetov Moscow; Nikolay Khlystov; Alexei Guryshev	Moscow
