= 1965–66 Soviet Cup (ice hockey) =

The 1965–66 Soviet Cup was the eighth edition of the Soviet Cup ice hockey tournament, and the first since 1961. 61 teams participated in the tournament, which was won by CSKA Moscow for the fifth consecutive season.

== Tournament ==
=== First round ===
| Okean Vladivostok | 6:13 | Aeroflot Omsk |
| Yuzhny Ural Orsk | 2:9 | Torpedo Gorki |
| Gornyak Ryazan | 4:5 | Stroitel Orenburg |
| Torpedo Rubzovsk | 6:3 | Torpedo Ust-Kamenogorsk |
| Energija Novosibirsk | 6:4 | Shaktor Prokopyevsk |
| Torpedo Vologda | 1:6 | Lokomotiv Moscow |
| Torpedo Ust-Kamenogorsk II | 5:7 | Metallurg Novokuznetsk |
| Metallist Izhevsk | 3:4 | Gorod Elektrostal |
| Ural Perm | 1:4 | Progress Glazov |
| Metallist Kovrov | 2:14 | SKA Leningrad |
| SK im. Vorowskogo Kazan | 1:6 | Molot Perm |
| Trud Sagorsk | 4:1 | Wimpel Minsk |
| Poligrafmasch Shadrinsk | 0:8 | Krylja Sowetow Moskau |
| Trud Miass | 1:2 | Mashinostroitel Zlatoust |

=== Second round ===
| SKA Kalinin | 7:2 | Rossiya Krasnoyarsk |
| Trud Ukhta | 4:12 | Dynamo Moscow |
| Motor Barnaul | 2:12 | SKA Novosibirsk |
| Torpedo Ulyanovsk | 3:4 | Spartak Ryazan |
| Dynamo Briansk | 0:6 | Dynamo Kiev |
| Vodnik Tyumen | 2:10 | Spartak Sverdlovsk |
| Torpedo Yaroslavl | 2:4 | Spartak Moscow |
| Gidrostroitel Dicnogorsk | 10:5 | Torpedo Rubtsovsk |
| Torpedo Gorky | 11:1 | Aeroflot Omsk |
| Lokomotiv Moscow | 0:7 | Metallurg Novokuznetsk |
| Progress Glazov | 7:2 | Burevestnik volgograd |
| Meteor Rybinsk | 1:7 | SKA Leningrad |
| Shakhtor Korkino | 5:4 | Khimik Voskresensk |
| Elektrolampovy zavod Ryazan | 3:10 | Dynamo Leningrad |
| Trud Pavlovo-Posad | 1:7 | Daugava Riga |
| Lokomotiv Novokuznetsk | 1:8 | Sibir Novosibirsk |
| Olimpiya Kirovo-Chepetsk | 4:5 | Dizelist Penza |

=== 1/16 finals ===
| Kalev Tallinn | 0:16 | CSKA Moscow |
| SKA Kalinin | 6:3 | Avtomobilist Ivanovo |
| Metallurg Serov | 2:4 | Dynamo Moscow |
| Spartak Sverdlovsk | 4:3 | Dynamo Kiev |
| Mauak Kubyshev | 2:33 | Spartak Moscow |
| Progress Glazov | 0:7 | SKA Leningrad |
| Molot Perm | 3:1 | Krylya Sovetov Moscow |
| Torpedo Gorky | 5:6 | Daugava Riga |
| Sibir Novosibirsk | 6:3 | Dizelist Penza |

=== 1/8 finals ===
| SKA Kalinin | 1:12 | Dynamo Moscow |
| Spartak Sverdlovsk | 8:5 | SKA Novosibirsk |
| Spartak Moscow | 6:2 | Gidrostroitel Divnogorsk |
| SKA Leningrad | 9:1 | Molot Perm |
| Shakitor Korkino | 3:5 | Voskhod Chelyabinsk |
| Daugava Riga | 7:5 | Sibir Novosibirsk |

=== Quarterfinals ===
| Dynamo Moscow | 5:3 | Spartak Sverdlovsk |
| Spartak Moscow | 5:2 | Torpedo Gorky |
| SKA Leningrad | 6:1 | Voskhod Chelyabinsk |
| Daugava Riga | 3:15 | CSKA Moscow |

=== Semifinals ===
| Dynamo Moscow | 3:0 | Spartak Moscow |
| SKA Leningrad | 2:8 | CSKA Moscow |

=== Final ===
| CSKA Moscow | 6:1, 8:2 | Dynamo Moscow |
