= 1954–55 Soviet Cup (ice hockey) =

The 1954–55 Soviet Cup was the fifth edition of the Soviet Cup ice hockey tournament.

21 teams participated in the tournament, which was won by CDSA Moscow for the second consecutive season.

== Tournament ==
=== First round ===
Dynamo Tallinn	3:2	Iskra Minsk

=== Second round ===
Dynamo Petrosavodsk	2:14	ODO Leningrad II
SK im. Sverdlova Molotov	3:1	Kalev Tallinn
Khimik Voskresensk	3:1	SK im. Stalina Molotov
Dynamo Tallinn	9:0	Lokomotiv Riga

=== 1/8 finals ===
Dynamo Moscow	3:0	Avangard Leningrad
Spartak Sverdlovsk	4:3	Dynamo Novosibirsk
ODO Leningrad II	2:7	KKM Elektrostal
SK im. Sverdlova Molotov	2:12	ODO Leningrad
Dynamo Tallinn	1:21	Krylya Sovetov Moscow
Khimik Voskresensk	2:1	Avangard Chelyabinsk
Spartak Moscow	3:4	Daugava Riga
Torpedo Gorky	0:14	CDSA Moscow

=== Quarterfinals ===
Dynamo Moscow	12:0	Spartak Sverdlovsk
KKM Elektrostal	2:5	ODO Leningrad
Krylya Sovetov Moscow	2:0	Khimik Voskresensk
Daugava Riga	0:9	CDSA Moscow

=== Semifinals ===
Dynamo Moscow	9:3	ODO Leningrad
Krylya Sovetov Moscow	1:5	CDSA Moscow

=== Final ===
Dynamo Moscow	2:5	CDSA Moscow
