= 1951–52 Soviet Cup (ice hockey) =

The 1951–52 Soviet Cup was the second edition of the Soviet Cup ice hockey tournament. In total, 27 teams participated in the tournament, which was won by VVS MVO Moscow.

== Tournament ==
=== 1/16 Finals ===
Torpedo Gorky	4:7	ODO Leningrad
Dzerzhinets Leningrad	6:7	Dynamo Tallinn
Kalev Tallinn	0:23	Dynamo Leningrad
Spartak Minsk	5:0	Lokomotiv Kharkiv
Dynamo Moscow II	1:3	SKA MVO Kalinin
Khimik Elektrostal	0:9	VVS MVO Moscow
WEF Riga	4:3*	Lokomotiv Riga
ODO Novosibirsk	5:17	Dynamo Moscow
Dzerzhinets Chelyabinsk	5:3	VVS MVO Moscow II
Spartak Tallinn	2:24	Daugava Riga

=== 1/8 Finals ===
ODO Leningrad	(W) **	Zalgiris Kaunas
CDSA Moscow	7:0	Dynamo Tallinn
Dynamo Leningrad	2:11	Krylya Sovetov Moscow
Gosuniversitet Penza	(W) **	Spartak Vilnius
Spartak Minsk	3:1	Spartak Kalinin
VVS MVO Moscow	9:3	Spartak Moscow
WEF Riga	0:13	'Dynamo Moscow
Dzerzhinets Chelyabinsk	2:5	Daugava Riga

=== Quarterfinals ===
ODO Leningrad	1:8	CDSA Moscow
Krylya Sovetov Moscow	21:0	Gosuniversitet Penza
Spartak Minsk	0:5	VVS MVO Moscow
Dynamo Moscow	6:0	Daugava Riga

=== Semifinals ===
CDSA Moscow	1:4	Krylya Sovetov Moscow
VVS MVO Moscow	6:1	Dynamo Moscow

=== Final ===
VVS MVO Moscow	6:5	Krylya Sovetov Moscow

(* The game was annulled and the replayed game was won 3-2 by VEF Riga. ** The game was not contested due to one of the teams not participating.)
