= 1955–56 Soviet Cup (ice hockey) =

The 1955–56 Soviet Cup was the sixth edition of the Soviet Cup ice hockey tournament. 46 teams participated in the tournament, which was won by CSK MO Moscow for the third consecutive season.

== Tournament ==
=== First round ===
Khimik Kirov	2:12	Avangard Leningrad
Torpedo Glazov	3:2	Daugava Riga
Metallurg Novokuznetsk	19:2	Spartak Novosibirsk
Torpedo Vologda	2:18	Lokomotiv Moscow
Burevestnik Penza	12:4	Shaktor Ryazan
Burevestnik Krasnoyarsk	0:9	Dynamo Novosibirsk
Gorod Kasan	2:5	KKM Elektrostal
Spartak Ivanovo	4:6	Energija Ufa
Zalgiris Kaunas	2:18	Spartak Moscow
Spartak Minsk	2:11	ODO Leningrad
Spartak Petrosavodsk	7:8	Burevestnik Moscow
Burevestnik Minsk	6:3	Kirovez Leningrad
Dynamo Tartu	2:13	Khimik Voskresensk
Torpedo Gorky	2:3	Torpedo Gorky II
Dom ofizerov Kiev	2:9	Spartak Sverdlovsk
Lokomotiv Riga	3:11	CSK MO Moscow II
Metallurg Serov	9:4	Spartak Omsk
Burevestnik Voronezh	W*	Burevestnik Chita
Avangrad Chelyabinsk	W*	Gorod Alma-Ata
Gorod Molotov	W*	Khimik Voskresensk II

=== Second round ===
Torpedo Vladimir	3:2	Spartak Yaroslavl
Krasnaya Svezda Krasnokamsk	4:3	Spartak Kuibyshev
Avangard Leningrad	22:2	Torpedo Glazov
Metallurg Novokuznetsk	5:6	Lokomotiv Moscow
Burevestnik Penza	5:6	Dynamo Novosibirsk
KKM Elektrostal	(W)*	Energija Ufa
Spartak Moscow	4:2	ODO Leningrad
Burevestnik Moscow	3:4	Burevestnik Minsk
Khimik Voskresensk	6:3	Torpedo Gorky II
Avangard Chelyabinsk	6:4	Spartak Swerdlovsk
CSK MO Moscow II	4:2	Burevestnik Voronzeh
Metallurg Serowv	3:8	Molot Perm
Metallurg Magnitogorsk	1:5	Metallurg Elektrostal

=== 1/8 finals ===
Torpedo Vladimir	3:5	Krasnaya svezda Krasnoyarsk
CSK MO	6:0	Avangard Leningrad
Lokomotiv Moscow	1:6	Dynamo Novosibirsk
KKM Elektrostal	1:9	Krylya Sovetov Moscow
Spartak Moscow	(W)*	Burevestnik Moscow
Khimik Voskresensk	4:3	Avangard Chelyabinsk
CSK MO Moscow II	1:0	Gorod Molotov Perm
Metallurg Elektrostal	0:13	Dynamo Moscow

=== Quarterfinals ===
Krasnaya svezda Krasnoyarsk	0:23	CSK MO Moscow
Dynamo Novosibirsk	3:10	Krylya Sovetov Moscow
Spartak Moscow	4:1	Khimik Voskresensk
CSK MO Moscow II	1:10	Dynamo Moscow

=== Semifinals ===
CSK MO Moscow	4:2	Krylya Sovetov Moscow
Spartak Moscow	0:3	Dynamo Moscow

=== Final ===
CSK MO Moscow; Aleksander Komarov; Yuri Pantyukhov	2:0	Dynamo Moscow

(* Automatic victory because opponent did not participate.)
