= 1997–98 Russian Superleague season =

- League: Russian Superleague
- Sport: Ice hockey
- Duration: September 3, 1997 – April 24, 1998
- Number of teams: 28

Regular season
- Season champions: Ak Bars Kazan

Final Round
- Final Rnd champions: Ak Bars Kazan

Russian Cup

Russian Cup Finals
- Champions: Metallurg Magnitogorsk
- Runners-up: HC Dynamo Moscow

Russian Superleague seasons
- ← 1996–97 1998–99 →

The 1997–98 Russian Superleague season was the second season of the Russian Superleague, the top level of ice hockey in Russia. 28 teams participated in the league, and Ak Bars Kazan won the championship. HC Metallurg Magnitogorsk won the Russian Cup.

== Regular season ==
=== Western Conference ===
	Club	GP	W	T	L	GF	GA	Pts
1.	Torpedo Yaroslavl	26	19	3	4	74	37	41
2.	HC Dynamo Moscow	26	17	5	4	83	40	39
3.	HC Lada Togliatti	26	16	6	4	76	42	38
4.	Severstal Cherepovets	26	16	4	6	60	43	36
5.	HC Spartak Moscow	26	13	5	8	81	61	31
6.	SKA St. Petersburg	26	12	4	10	55	52	28
7.	Neftekhimik Nizhnekamsk	26	10	4	12	64	61	24
8.	HC CSKA Moscow	26	11	1	14	57	67	23
9.	Krylya Sovetov Moscow	26	11	1	14	57	66	23
10.	Khimik Voskresensk	26	8	6	12	60	72	22
11.	Torpedo Nizhny Novgorod	26	9	4	13	48	57	22
12.	HC CSKA Moscow	26	6	3	17	44	84	15
13.	Kristall Elektrostal	26	6	2	49	79	81	14
14.	Diselist Penza	26	2	4	20	43	90	8

=== Eastern Conference ===
	Club	GP	W	T	L	GF	GA	Pts
1.	Ak Bars Kazan	26	22	1	3	96	40	45
2.	Metallurg Magnitogorsk	26	19	5	2	109	42	43
3.	Avangard Omsk	26	14	5	7	78	50	33
4.	Molot-Prikamye Perm	26	12	7	7	82	71	31
5.	CSK VVS Samara	26	12	3	11	59	61	27
6.	Rubin Tyumen	26	11	5	10	85	79	27
7.	Salavat Yulaev Ufa	26	11	4	11	70	63	26
8.	HC Mechel Chelyabinsk	26	9	7	10	51	57	25
9.	Traktor Chelyabinsk	26	8	7	11	60	68	23
10.	Amur Khabarovsk	26	8	5	13	64	78	21
11.	Metallurg Novokuznetsk	26	7	6	13	56	76	20
12.	Kristall Saratov	26	6	6	14	54	78	18
13.	Dinamo-Energija Yekaterinburg	26	6	1	19	40	88	13
14.	HC Sibir Novosibirsk	26	4	4	18	41	95	12

== Final round ==
	Club	GP	W	T	L	GF	GA	Pts
1.	Ak Bars Kazan	46	36	3	7	158	79	75
2.	Metallurg Magnitogorsk	46	31	10	5	173	82	72
3.	Torpedo Yaroslavl	46	33	6	7	130	60	72
4.	HC Lada Togliatti	46	32	7	7	165	71	71
5.	HC Dynamo Moscow	46	30	6	10	151	91	66
6.	Avangard Omsk	46	28	5	13	139	86	61
7.	Severstal Cherepovets	46	27	7	12	110	81	61
8.	Molot-Prikamye Perm	46	21	7	18	150	130	49
9.	HC Spartak Moscow	46	20	9	17	128	115	49
10.	SKA St. Petersburg	46	20	7	19	107	105	47
11.	Neftekhimik Nizhnekamsk	46	19	5	22	126	121	43
12.	Rubin Tyumen	46	17	7	22	137	152	41
13.	Amur Khabarovsk	46	17	7	22	112	138	41
14.	Khimik Voskresensk	46	16	7	23	101	127	39
15.	CSK VVS Samara	46	16	6	24	92	117	38
16.	Traktor Chelyabinsk	46	14	10	22	99	129	38
17.	HC CSKA Moscow	46	17	3	26	107	137	37
18.	Krylya Sovetov Moscow	46	17	2	27	99	132	36
19.	Salavat Yulaev Ufa	46	15	6	25	108	128	36
20.	HC Mechel Chelyabinsk	46	13	8	25	84	125	34

== Russian Cup (Playoffs) ==
First round
1	Ak Bars Kazan	2
16	Traktor Chelyabinsk	0
8	Molot-Prikamye Perm	1
9	HC Spartak Moscow	2
5	HC Dynamo Moscow	2
12	Rubin Tyumen	0
4	HC Lada Togliatti	2
13	Amur Khabarovsk	1
3	Torpedo Yaroslavl	2
14	Khimik Voskresensk	0
6	Avangard Omsk	2
11	Neftekhimik Nizhnekamsk	0
7	Severstal Cherepovets	2
10	SKA St. Petersburg	0
2	Metallurg Magnitogorsk	2
15	CSK VVS Samara	0

Quarterfinal
1	Ak Bars Kazan	2
8	HC Spartak Moscow	0
4	HC Lada Togliatti	1
5	HC Dynamo Moscow	2
3	Torpedo Yaroslavl	2
6	Avangard Omsk	1
2	Metallurg Magnitogorsk	2
7	Severstal Cherepovets	0

Semifinal
1	Ak Bars Kazan	1
5	HC Dynamo Moscow	2
3	Torpedo Yaroslavl	0
2	Metallurg Magnitogorsk	2

Final
5	HC Dynamo Moscow	1
2	Metallurg Magnitogorsk	3

== Relegation ==
	Club	GP	W	T	L	GF	GA	Pts
1.	Metallurg Novokuznetsk	22	15	2	5	65	42	32
2.	HC Lipetsk	22	13	5	4	61	38	31
3.	Neftyanik Almetyevsk	22	11	4	7	49	44	26
4.	Dinamo-Energija Yekaterinburg	22	11	2	9	65	60	24
5.	Dizelist Pezsa	22	10	2	10	58	49	22
6.	HC CSKA Moscow	22	10	2	10	59	61	22
7.	Torpedo Nizhny Novgorod	22	9	4	9	47	42	22
8.	Kristall Elektrostal	22	8	4	10	48	58	20
9.	Kristall Saratov	22	9	2	11	62	66	20
10.	Izhstal Izhevsk	22	7	5	10	53	64	19
11.	HC Voronezh	22	7	1	14	58	65	15
12.	HC Sibir Novosibirsk	22	4	3	15	48	84	11
