= 1994–95 IHL (Russia) season =

1994–95 IHL season
- League: International Hockey League
- Sport: Ice hockey
- Number of teams: 28

Regular season
- Season champions: HC Lada Togliatti

Playoffs

Finals
- Champions: HC Dynamo Moscow
- Runners-up: HC Lada Togliatti

IHL seasons
- ← 1993–94 1995–96 →

The 1994–95 International Hockey League season was the third season of the International Hockey League, the top level of ice hockey in Russia. 28 teams participated in the league, and HK Dynamo Moscow won the championship by defeating HK Lada Togliatti in the final.

== Regular season ==
=== Western Conference ===
	Club	GP	W	T	L	GF	GA	Pts
1.	Torpedo Yaroslavl	52	33	4	15	152	96	70
2.	Krylya Sovetov Moscow	52	30	8	14	173	120	68
3.	HK Dynamo Moscow	52	30	6	16	172	107	66
4.	Torpedo Nizhny Novgorod	52	26	10	16	137	111	62
5.	Ak Bars Kazan	52	27	7	18	150	123	61
6.	HK CSKA Moscow	52	25	7	20	158	114	57
7.	SKA St. Petersburg	52	26	5	21	127	122	57
8.	Khimik Voskresensk	52	23	8	21	122	125	54
9.	HK Spartak Moscow	52	23	5	24	132	154	51
10.	Metallurg Cherepovets	52	20	4	28	111	151	44
11.	Kristall Elektrostal	52	17	4	31	112	157	38
12.	Tivali Minsk	52	13	8	31	102	151	34
13.	HK Sokol Kiev	52	12	10	30	104	152	34
14.	HK Pārdaugava Riga	52	14	4	34	99	168	32

=== Eastern Conference ===
	Club	GP	W	T	L	GF	GA	Pts
1.	HK Lada Togliatti	52	41	4	7	229	83	86
2.	HK Avangard Omsk	52	36	8	8	220	100	80
3.	HK Metallurg Magnitogorsk	52	37	3	12	260	134	77
4.	Salavat Yulaev Ufa	52	31	11	10	219	126	73
5.	HK Traktor Chelyabinsk	52	26	5	21	177	146	57
6.	Molot-Prikamie Perm	52	27	3	22	144	140	57
7.	Torpedo Ust-Kamenogorsk	52	24	4	24	173	171	52
8.	Avtomobilist Yekaterinburg	52	18	12	22	126	137	48
9.	CSK VVS Samara	52	19	7	26	161	169	45
10.	Kristall Saratov	52	19	5	28	134	173	43
11.	Rubin Tyumen	52	18	4	30	155	205	40
12.	HK Sibir Novosibirsk	52	14	3	35	158	273	31
13.	Metallurg Novokuznetsk	52	11	8	33	125	185	30
14.	Stroitel Karaganda	52	3	3	46	99	338	9

== Playoffs ==
First round
O1	HK Lada Togliatti	2
O8	Khimik Voskresensk	0
O4	Torpedo Nizhny Novgorod	2
O5	HK Traktor Chelyabinsk	1
O3	HK Metallurg Magnitogorsk	2
O6	HK CSKA Moscow	0
O2	Krylya Sovetov Moscow	2
O7	Torpedo Ust-Kamenogorsk	0
W2	HK Avangard Omsk	2
W7	SKA St. Petersburg	1
W3	HK Dynamo Moscow	2
W6	Molot-Prikamie Perm	1
W4	Salavat Yulaev Ufa	2
W5	Ak Bars Kazan	0
W1	Torpedo Yaroslavl	2
W8	Awtomobilist Yekaterinburg	0

Quarterfinals
O1	HK Lada Togliatti	2
O4	Torpedo Nizhny Novgorod	0
O3	HK Metallurg Magnitogorsk	2
O2	Krylya Sovetov Moscow	0
W2	HK Avangard Omsk	1
W3	HK Dynamo Moscow	2
W4	Salavat Yulaev Ufa	2
W1	Torpedo Yaroslavl	0

Semifinals
O1	HK Lada Togliatti	2
O3	HK Metallurg Magnitogorsk	1
W3	HK Dynamo Moscow	2
W4	Salavat Yulaev Ufa	1

Final
O1	HK Lada Togliatti	2
W2	HK Dynamo Moscow	3
