= Maxim Eprev =

Russian ice hockey player

- Born: December 3, 1988 (age 36); Podolsk, Russian SFSR
- Height: 6 ft 1 in (185 cm)
- Weight: 174 lb (79 kg; 12 st 6 lb)
- Position: Defence
- Shoots: Left
- KHL team Former teams: Dynamo Moscow; Vityaz Chekhov; Metallurg Novokuznetsk; Ermak Angarsk
- Playing career: 2006–present

Maxim Sergeyevich Eprev (born December 3, 1988) is a Russian professional ice hockey defenceman who currently plays for Dynamo Moscow in the Kontinental Hockey League.
