= 1996–97 Russian Superleague season =

- League: Russian Superleague
- Sport: Ice hockey
- Duration: September 10, 1996 – April 24, 1997
- Teams: 26

First Round
- First Rnd champions: HC Lada Togliatti

Final Round
- Final Rnd champions: HC Lada Togliatti

Playoffs

Finals
- Champions: Torpedo Yaroslavl
- Runners-up: HC Lada Togliatti

Russian Superleague seasons
- ← 1995–96 1997–98 →

The 1996–97 Russian Superleague season was the first season of the Russian Superleague, the top level of ice hockey in Russia. 26 teams participated in the league, and Torpedo Yaroslavl won the championship.

== First round ==
=== Western Conference ===
	Club	GP	W	T	L	GF	GA	Pts
1.	Ak Bars Kazan	24	17	3	4	77	40	37
2.	Torpedo Yaroslavl	24	16	4	4	65	31	36
3.	HC CSKA Moscow	24	12	5	7	58	58	29
4.	Krylya Sovetov Moscow	24	12	3	9	83	61	27
5.	HC Dynamo Moscow	24	12	3	9	60	55	27
6.	HC Spartak Moscow	24	11	3	10	62	63	25
7.	Khimik Voskresensk	24	9	6	9	65	63	24
8.	Neftekhimik Nizhnekamsk	24	10	4	10	47	49	24
9.	Severstal Cherepovets	24	6	10	8	56	59	22
10.	SKA St. Petersburg	24	7	5	12	46	59	19
11.	Torpedo Nizhny Novgorod	24	6	4	14	47	64	16
12.	Dizelist Penza	24	6	3	15	52	81	15
13.	Kristall Elektrostal	24	4	3	17	44	79	11

=== Eastern Conference ===
	Club	GP	W	T	L	GF	GA	Pts
1.	HC Lada Togliatti	24	20	2	2	116	43	42
2.	Rubin Tyumen	24	15	3	6	81	61	33
3.	Metallurg Magnitogorsk	24	15	3	6	81	50	33
4.	Avangard Omsk	24	14	3	7	75	47	31
5.	Salavat Yulaev Ufa	24	14	1	9	83	58	29
6.	Traktor Chelyabinsk	24	10	6	8	60	56	26
7.	Kristall Saratov	24	10	1	13	76	87	21
8.	Metallurg Novokuznetsk	24	8	4	12	65	81	20
9.	CSK VVS Samara	24	9	1	14	65	72	19
10.	HC Sibir Novosibirsk	24	8	2	14	62	106	18
11.	Amur Khabarovsk	24	6	5	13	62	84	17
12.	Spartak Yekaterinburg	24	6	1	17	68	104	13
13.	Molot-Prikamye Perm	24	5	0	19	50	95	10

== Final round ==
	Club	GP	W	T	L	GF	GA	Pts
1.	HC Lada Togliatti	38	30	3	5	146	63	63
2.	Ak Bars Kazan	38	25	5	8	113	78	55
3.	Torpedo Yaroslavl	38	24	6	8	120	62	54
4.	Metallurg Magnitogorsk	38	23	4	11	134	91	50
5.	Avangard Omsk	38	19	7	12	126	84	45
6.	HC Dynamo Moscow	38	17	7	14	105	88	41
7.	Salavat Yulaev Ufa	38	17	6	15	116	97	40
8.	Rubin Tyumen	38	17	5	16	114	106	39
9.	Krylya Sovetov Moscow	38	17	4	17	112	105	38
10.	Severstal Cherepovets	38	14	10	14	95	92	38
11.	Traktor Chelyabinsk	38	13	9	16	82	95	35
12.	Khimik Voskresensk	38	13	8	17	97	114	34
13.	HC CSKA Moscow	38	12	10	16	83	104	34
14.	Neftekhimik Nizhnekamsk	38	12	9	17	65	85	33
15.	Kristall Saratov	38	14	4	20	102	125	32
16.	CSK VVS Samara	38	14	4	20	85	114	32
17.	HC Spartak Moscow	38	13	5	20	95	119	31
18.	SKA St. Petersburg	38	8	7	23	85	116	23
19.	Metallurg Novokuznetsk	38	7	8	23	77	122	22
20.	HC Sibir Novosibirsk	38	8	5	25	78	170	21

== Playoffs ==
First round
1	HC Lada Togliatti	2
16	CSK VVS Samara	0
8	Rubin Tyumen	2
9	Krylya Sovetov Moscow	0
4	HC Avangard Omsk	2
13	Khimik Voskresensk	0
7	Metallurg Magnitogorsk	2
10	HC CSKA Moscow	0
3	Torpedo Yaroslavl	2
14	Neftekhimik Nizhnekamsk	0
6	HC Dynamo Moscow	2
11	Traktor Chelyabinsk	0
7	Salavat Yulaev Ufa	2
10	Severstal Cherepovets	1
2	Ak Bars Kazan	1
15	Kristall Saratov	2

Quarterfinal
1	HC Lada Togliatti	2
8	Rubin Tyumen	1
5	HC Avangard Omsk	1
4	Metallurg Magnitogorsk	2
3	Torpedo Yaroslavl	2
6	HC Dynamo Moscow	0
7	Salavat Yulaev Ufa	2
15	Kristall Saratov	1

Semifinal
1	HC Lada Togliatti	2
4	Metallurg Magnitogorsk	1
3	Torpedo Yaroslavl	2
7	Salavat Yulaev Ufa	0

Final
1	HC Lada Togliatti	0
3	Torpedo Yaroslavl	3

3rd place: Metallurg Magnitogorsk − Salavat Yulaev Ufa 1:2

== Relegation ==
	Club	GP	W	T	L	GF	GA	Pts
1.	Amur Khabarovsk	36	23	3	10	125	76	49
2.	Kristall Elektrostal	36	21	7	8	117	86	49
3.	HC Mechel Chelyabinsk	36	21	5	10	107	78	47
4.	HC CSKA Moscow	36	21	4	11	115	90	46
5.	Torpedo Nizhny Novgorod	36	17	5	14	103	88	39
6.	Dizelist Penza	36	14	3	19	93	107	31
7.	Neftyanik Almetyevsk	36	11	6	19	79	100	28
8.	HC Lipetsk	36	10	8	18	111	128	28
9.	Spartak Yekaterinburg	36	10	6	20	96	125	26
10.	Molot-Prikamye Perm	36	6	5	25	57	125	17
