= 1998–99 Russian Superleague season =

- League: Russian Superleague
- Sport: Ice hockey
- Duration: September 12, 1998 – April 15, 1999
- Number of teams: 22

Regular season
- Season champions: Metallurg Magnitogorsk

Playoffs

Final
- Champions: Metallurg Magnitogorsk
- Runners-up: HC Dynamo Moscow

Russian Superleague seasons
- ← 1997–98 1999–00 →

The 1998–99 Russian Superleague season was the third season of the Russian Superleague, the top level of ice hockey in Russia. 22 teams participated in the league, and Metallurg Magnitogorsk won the championship.

== Regular season ==
	Club	GP	W	T	L	GF	GA	Pts
1.	Metallurg Magnitogorsk	42	34	6	2	180	80	74
2.	Metallurg Novokuznetsk	42	32	2	8	133	64	66
3.	HC Dynamo Moscow	42	26	11	5	127	63	63
4.	Avangard Omsk	42	28	7	7	118	71	63
5.	Torpedo Yaroslavl	42	26	5	11	99	61	57
6.	HC Lada Togliatti	42	20	12	10	122	83	52
7.	Ak Bars Kazan	42	20	10	12	105	75	50
8.	Molot-Prikamye Perm	42	16	10	16	110	102	42
9.	Salavat Yulaev Ufa	42	14	11	17	98	113	39
10.	Amur Khabarovsk	42	16	6	20	85	100	38
11.	HC Lipetsk	42	13	11	18	82	120	37
12.	HC CSKA Moscow	42	14	9	19	91	85	37
13.	Neftekhimik Nizhnekamsk	42	13	11	18	109	122	37
14.	HC Mechel Chelyabinsk	42	14	9	19	98	117	37
15.	Severstal Cherepovets	42	14	8	20	98	112	36
16.	CSK VVS Samara	42	17	2	23	85	114	36
17.	Krylya Sovetov Moscow	42	12	10	20	83	114	34
18.	Traktor Chelyabinsk	42	13	6	23	80	118	32
19.	HC Spartak Moscow	42	14	4	24	84	107	32
20.	SKA St. Petersburg	42	10	12	20	100	111	32
21.	Khimik Voskresensk	42	8	2	32	68	140	18
22.	Rubin Tyumen	42	4	4	34	86	169	12

== Playoffs ==
First round
1	Metallurg Magnitogorsk	3
16	CSK VVS Samara	0
8	Molot-Prikamye Perm	3
9	Salavat Yulaev Ufa	1
4	Avangard Omsk	3
13	Neftekhimik Nizhnekamsk	0
5	Torpedo Yaroslavl	3
12	HC CSKA Moscow	0
3	HC Dynamo Moscow	3
14	HC Mechel Chelyabinsk	0
6	HC Lada Togliatti	3
11	HC Lipetsk	0
2	Metallurg Novokuznetsk	3
15	Severstal Cherepovets	0
7	Ak Bars Kazan	3
10	Amur Khabarovsk	0

Quarterfinals
1	Metallurg Magnitogorsk	3
8	Molot-Prikamye Perm	0
4	Avangard Omsk	0
5	Torpedo Yaroslavl	3
3	HC Dynamo Moscow	3
6	HC Lada Togliatti	1
2	Metallurg Novokuznetsk	0
7	Ak Bars Kazan	3

Semifinals
1	Metallurg Magnitogorsk	3
5	Torpedo Yaroslavl	1
3	HC Dynamo Moscow	3
7	Ak Bars Kazan	0

Final
1	Metallurg Magnitogorsk	4
3	HC Dynamo Moscow	2

== Relegation ==
	Club	GP	W	T	L	GF	GA	Pts
1.	Dinamo-Energija Yekaterinburg	22	14	5	3	72	39	33
2.	SKA St. Petersburg	22	11	7	4	68	48	29
3.	Kristall Elektrostal	22	13	2	7	58	46	28
4.	Torpedo Nizhny Novgorod	22	12	3	7	80	44	27
5.	HC Sibir Novosibirsk	22	10	4	8	46	45	24
6.	Rubin Tyumen	22	9	5	8	57	60	23
7.	Traktor Chelyabinsk	22	8	6	8	57	57	22
8.	HC Spartak Moscow	22	9	2	11	50	64	20
9.	Khimik Voskresensk	22	8	3	11	41	50	19
10.	Neftyanik Almetyevsk	22	6	6	10	51	69	18
11.	HC CSKA Moscow	22	4	5	13	45	64	13
12.	Krylya Sovetov Moscow	22	3	2	17	38	77	8
