= Pervaya Liga (Soviet Union) =

- Sport: Ice hockey
- Founded: 1947
- Folded: 1992
- Country: Soviet Union

The Pervaya Liga was the second level of ice hockey in the Soviet Union, below the Soviet Championship League. The league was first contested during the 1947–48 season.
