= Kristall Saratov =

Russian ice hockey team

- City: Saratov, Russia
- League: VHL; 2010-2014, 2015-2017, 2023-present: VHL-B 2017-2023; Vysshaya Liga 1998-2010; RSL 1996-1998; IHL 1992-1996; Soviet League Class A2 1964-1966, 1967-1974, 1975-1976, 1977-1981, 1982-1992; Soviet League Class A 1974-1975, 1976-1977, 1981-1982; Soviet League Class A3 1966-1967; Soviet League Class B 1958-1964
- Founded: 1946
- Home arena: Sports Palace Kristall (6,100 seats)
- Colours
- General manager: Vyacheslav Natalichev
- Head coach: Sergey Krovyakov
- Affiliate: Kristall-Yunior (NMHL)
- Website: Official website

Kristall Saratov is an ice hockey team in Saratov, Russia. They play in the VHL, the second level of Russian ice hockey.

== History ==
The club was founded as Bolshevik Saratov in 1948. They have gone through a number of name changes during their history.

- 1949: Nauka Saratov
- 1950: Iskra Saratov
- 1954: Iskra Saratov folded.
- 1958: Trud Saratov was founded as the successor to Iskra Saratov.
- 1961: Avangard Saratov
- 1965: Energiya Saratov
- 1969: Kristall Saratov

== Achievements ==
- Soviet League Class A2 champion: 1967, 1974, 1976
