= Kristall Elektrostal =

Russian ice hockey team

- City: Elektrostal, Russia
- League: Junior Hockey League Division B
- Founded: 1949
- Home arena: Ledovyi Dvorets Sporta Kristall
- Colours: Red, Black, Yellow, White

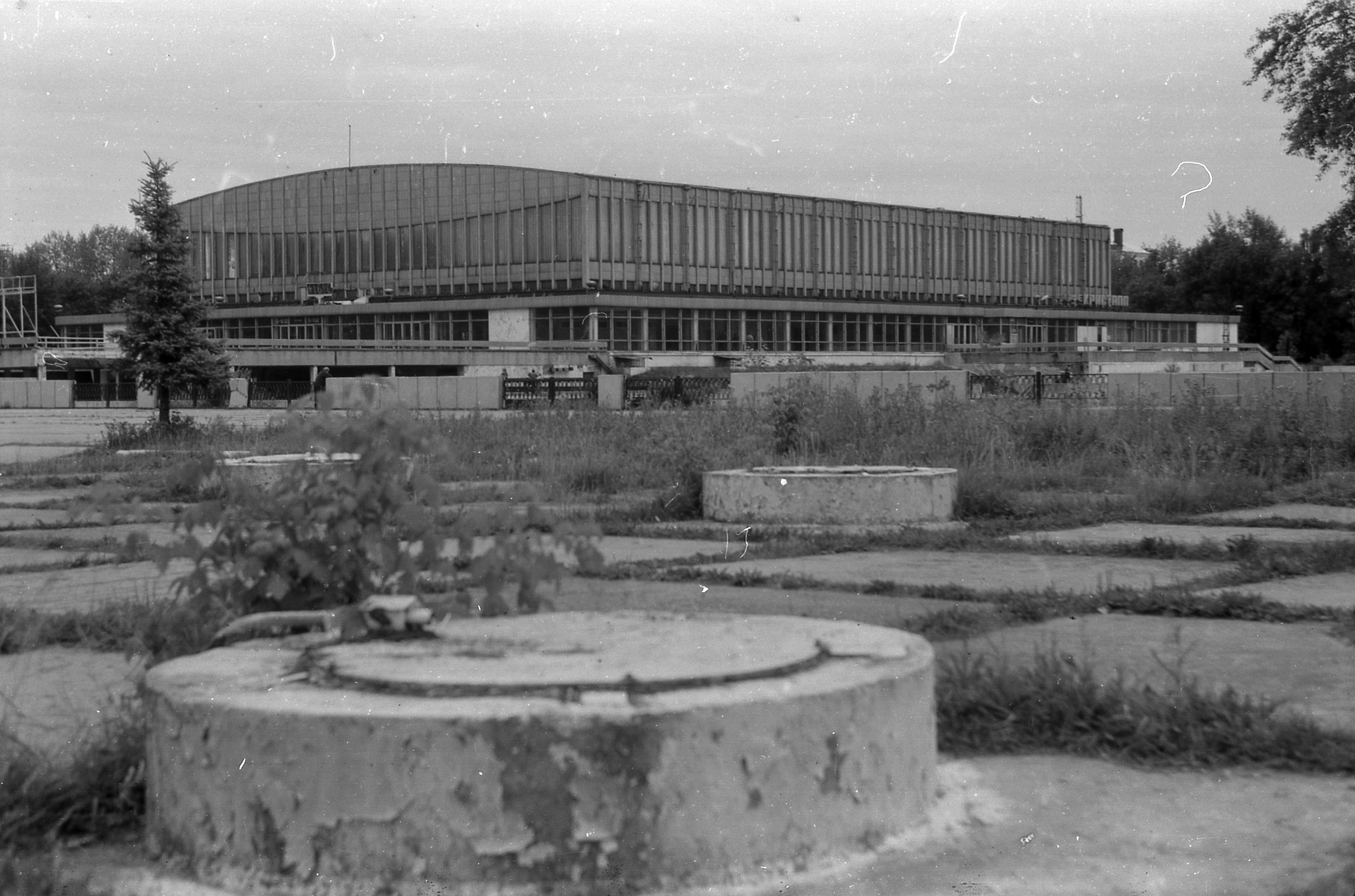
Home arena - Ledovyi Dvorets Sporta «Kristall» in 1995 year.

Kristall Elektrostal is an ice hockey team in Elektrostal, Russia. They play in the Junior Hockey League Division B, the second level of Russian junior ice hockey.

== History ==
The club was created as Khimik Elektrostal in 1949. They have changed their name seven times in history:

- 1953: Klub imeni Karla Marksa Elektrostal
- 1954: DK imeni Karla Marksa Elektrostal
- 1956: Elektrostal
- 1968: Kristall Elektrostal
- 1971: Ledovyi Dvorets Sporta "Kristall"
- 2000: Elemach Elektrostal
- 2003: Kristall Elektrostal

== Notable players ==
Nikolay Zherdev

Anton Babchuk

Vitali Proshkin

Alexander Suglobov

Alexei Kudashov

Dmitry Shikin

== Achievements ==
- Vysshaya Liga champion: 1972.

== See also ==
- nKristall Ice Sports Palace
