= Molot-Prikamye Perm =

Russian ice hockey team

Molot-Prikamye Perm Молот-Прикамье Пермь
- Nickname: "Hammer"
- City: Perm, Perm Krai
- League: VHL 2010-Present: Vysshaya Liga 2006-2010; Russian Superleague 2005-2006; Russian Supreme League 2003-2004; Russian Superleague 1999-2003; Russian Hockey League 1996-1999; Intl. Hockey League 1992-1996; CIS Championship 1992-1993; USSR Championship 1968-1991; Soviet Class A2 1964-1968; USSR Championship 1959-1964; Soviet Class A2 1958-1959; USSR Championship 1957-1958; Soviet Class B 1953-1957
- Founded: 1948
- Home arena: Universal Sports Palace Molot (capacity: 6,000)
- Colours
- General manager: Alexander Gulyavtsev
- Head coach: Sergei Berdnikov
- Affiliate: Neftekhimik Nizhnekamsk (KHL)
- Website: hv-molot.ru

Franchise history
- Molot-Prikamye Perm 1997-Present: Molot Perm 1959-97; SK im. Sverdlova 1948-59

Molot-Prikamye Perm (Russian: Молот-Прикамье Пермь) is a professional ice hockey team based in Perm, Perm Krai, Russia. They are playing in the Supreme Hockey League, the second level of ice hockey in Russia.
