= Dinamo-Energija Yekaterinburg =

- City: Yekaterinburg, Russia
- Founded: 1950
- Folded: 2007
- Home arena: Profsoyuznyi Sports Palace
- Colours: Blue, white

Franchise history
- 1950-1967: Spartak Sverdlovsk
- 1967-1992: Avtomobilist Sverdlovsk
- 1992-1997: Avtomobilist Yekaterinburg
- 1997-1998: Spartak Yekaterinburg
- 1998-2007: Dinamo-Energija Yekaterinburg

Dinamo-Energija Yekaterinburg (Russian: ХК Динамо-Энергия Екатеринбург) was an ice hockey team in Yekaterinburg, Russia.

== History ==
The club was founded in 1950 as Spartak Sverdlovsk. They played in the top-level leagues in the Soviet Union and Russia. They also won the second-level Soviet and Russian leagues eight times, in 1955, 1967, 1972, 1974, 1977, 1984, 1986, and 1999.

The club folded in 2007, and a new club in Yekaterinburg, Avtomobilist Yekaterinburg, was founded a year earlier.

== Notable players ==
- Pavel Datsyuk
- Ilya Byakin
- Sergei Shepelev
- Nikolai Khabibulin
- Alexei Yashin
- Vladimir Malakhov
