= Soviet Cup (ice hockey) =

The Soviet Cup was the national ice hockey cup competition in the Soviet Union. It was contested on-and-off from 1951 (74 years ago) to 1989 (36 years ago).

== Champions ==
- 1989 Krylya Sovetov Moscow
- 1988 CSKA Moscow
- 1979 CSKA Moscow
- 1977 CSKA Moscow
- 1976 Dynamo Moscow
- 1974 Krylya Sovetov Moscow
- 1973 CSKA Moscow
- 1972 Dynamo Moscow
- 1971 Spartak Moscow
- 1970 Spartak Moscow
- 1969 CSKA Moscow
- 1968 CSKA Moscow
- 1967 CSKA Moscow
- 1966 CSKA Moscow
- 1961 CSKA Moscow
- 1956 CSKA Moscow
- 1955 CSKA Moscow
- 1954 CSKA Moscow
- 1953 Dynamo Moscow
- 1952 VVS Moscow
- 1951 Krylya Sovetov Moscow

== Titles by team ==
Titles	Team	Year
12	CSKA Moscow	1954, 1955, 1956, 1961, 1966, 1967, 1968, 1969, 1973, 1977, 1979, 1988
3	Krylya Sovetov Moscow	1951, 1974, 1989
3	Dynamo Moscow	1953, 1972, 1976
2	Spartak Moscow	1970, 1971
1	VVS Moscow	1952

== See also ==
- Soviet Hockey Championship
- Russian Open Hockey Championship
- Russian Elite Hockey Scoring Champion
- Russian Elite Hockey Goal Scoring Champion
- Soviet MVP (ice hockey)
- Super Series
