= Krylya Sovetov Moscow =

Ice hockey team

Krylya Sovetov Крылья Советов
- City: Moscow
- League: MHL: since 2016: VHL: 2010–2011; Vysshaya Liga 1999–2001, 2003–2006, 2007–2010; RSL 1996–1999, 2001–2003, 2006–2007; IHL 1992–1996; Soviet League Class A 1947–1992
- Founded: 1947
- Home arena: Soviet Wings Sport Palace (capacity: 5,670)
- Head coach: Alexander Stepanov

Franchise history
- HC Krylya Sovetov: Krylya Sovetov – VILS Moscow (1999–2000); Zenit Moscow (1953–1954)

HC Krylya Sovetov (Russian: ХК Крылья Советов; Soviet Wings) is a professional ice hockey team based in Moscow, Russia. The team played in the top divisions of Soviet and Russian hockey.

In 2008, the team was expelled from the Soviet Wings Sport Palace and a new team, MHC Krylya Sovetov was created. PHC Krylya Sovetov played at the Minor Arena and Vityaz Ice Palace in Podolsk until 2010, when the team was reunited with MHC Krylya Sovetov and returned to the Soviet Wings Sport Palace. But after 2011, it ceased operating as a professional hockey club and withdrew from the championship on all levels. In 2016, the team returned to play in the MHL.

== History ==
Krylya Sovetov Moscow (Wings of the Soviets, Soviet Wings) was founded in 1947 by the Krylya Sovetov sports society that represented Soviet aircraft industry.

=== Controversy ===
In 2008, the owner of the Soviet Wings Sport Palace, the All-Russia Institute of Light Alloys (VILS) (Russian: Всероссийский институт лёгких сплавов (ВИЛС) accused Krylya Sovetov of overdue rent payments. This led to the subsequent eviction of the team. The main team left under president Aleksandr Tretiak's lead and took a name PHC Krylya Sovetov, but Krylya's hockey school, junior subsidiary teams, and other infrastructure opted to remain under the effective ownership of VILS.

After playing one season in Vysshaya Liga, the VILS team changed its affiliation to the Junior League. While PHC Krylya Sovetov failed to qualify for the VHL, a newly created independent league that was supposed to replace Vysshaya Liga. After the KHL president Alexander Medvedev interfered in the conflict, the situation was settled and both teams reunited to play in the VHL starting with its 2010–11 season. Albeit due to financial hardship the club had to resign from the league in the next season. Functionally, Krylya ceased to exist as a professional team in 2011.

== Honors ==
=== Champions ===
(gold) Soviet Championship League Championship (2): 1957, 1974
(gold) USSR Cup (3): 1951, 1974, 1989
(gold) European Cup (1): 1974
(gold) Spengler Cup (1): 1979
(gold) Ahearne Cup (2): 1961, 1968

=== Runners-up ===
(silver) Soviet Championship League Championship (4): 1955, 1956, 1958, 1975
(bronze) Soviet Championship League Championship (9): 1950, 1951, 1954, 1959, 1960, 1973, 1978, 1989, 1991
(bronze) IHL Championship (1): 1993
(silver) USSR Cup (2): 1952, 1954
(silver) Spengler Cup (1): 1987

== Notable alumni ==
(Soviet Union) Alexei Guryshev (1947–1961)
(Soviet Union) Alfred Kuchevsky (1949–1961)
(Soviet Union) Vladimir Petrov (1965–1967)
(Soviet Union) Alexander Sidelnikov (1967–1984)
(Soviet Union) Sergei Pryakhin (1979–1989)
(Russia) Yuri Khmylev (1980–1991)
(Russia) Viktor Gordiuk (1986–1992)
(Russia) Alexander Korolyuk (1992–1997)
(Russia) Alexei Morozov (1993–1997)
(Russia) Alexander Frolov (2000–2002)
(Russia) Anton Volchenkov (2001–2002)
