= Valentin Morozov =

Russian ice hockey player

- Born: June 1, 1975 (age 50) Moscow, Russian SFSR, Soviet Union
- Height: 5 ft 9 in (175 cm)
- Weight: 175 lb (79 kg; 12 st 7 lb)
- Position: Right wing
- Shot: Left
- Played for: CSKA Moscow; Russian Penguins; Krylja Sovetov; Syracuse Crunch; Wilkes-Barre/Scranton Penguins; Lada Togliatti; Ufa Salavat Yulayev
- National team: Russia
- NHL draft: 154th overall, 1994; Pittsburgh Penguins
- Playing career: 1993–2004

Valentin Morozov (Russian: Валентин Морозов; born June 1, 1975) is a Russian former professional ice hockey player who spent the majority of his career in the Russian Super League.

== Playing career ==
=== NHL draft ===
Valentin Morozov was drafted in the sixth round, 154th overall, by the Pittsburgh Penguins in the 1994 NHL entry draft. After being drafted, he remained in Russia and played four seasons with CSKA Moscov. After the 1996-97 season, Morozov left CSKA Moscow and signed with Krylia Sovetov.

=== AHL career ===
In the summer of 1998, Morozov would receive a training camp invite to skate with the Pittsburgh Penguins. Morozov was one of the final cuts of the Penguins training camp. On September 27, Morozov was assigned to the Penguins' AHL affiliate, the Syracuse Crunch. As a member of the Crunch, Morozov wore jersey #15. Despite finishing the season with 17 goals and 40 points in 63 games, Morozov also finished with a plus/minus of -40, which was the lowest mark among all Crunch players

Morozov was invited back to Pittsburgh Penguins training camp in the summer of 1999. After several weeks of training, Morozov was reassigned again to the Penguins' new AHL affiliate in Wilkes-Barre/Scranton. Morozov would change from his previous number 15 to 21. In 59 games with the W-B/S Penguins, Morozov scored 39 points, which was the fourth highest among Penguins forwards that season. After two seasons in North America, Morozov decided to return to Russia to continue his professional hockey career.

=== Russian Super League ===
Morozov returned to Russia for the 2000-01 season with Lada Togliatti, where he scored four points in nineteen games.

=== Russian Supreme League (Pervaya Liga) ===
In 2001-02, Morozov split time between the Russian Super League and the Pervaya Liga, a 2nd tier feeder league for the Russian Super League. He returned to the Central Red Army team. He played 18 games, scoring 4 goals and 4 assists. Morozov also played one game with Ufa Salavat Yulayev, also of the Russian Super League. While assigned to Pervaya Liga, Morozov split time between Severstal-2 Cherepovets and the Pervaya Liga's Central Red Army team.

=== Russian Major League (Vysshaya Liga) ===
Morozov spent the 2002-03 season with Khimik Voskresensk, a Vysshaya Liga team that was considered to be "Class-A 2nd division" to the Russian Super League. Morozov would have one of his best statistical seasons as a member of Khimik, scoring 20 points in 24 games.

Morozov would spend his final season splitting time between Krylia Sovetov's team in Vysshaya Liga and their team with Pervaya Liga.

== Personal ==
Valentin Morozov is the oldest brother of Ak Bars Kazan forward Aleksey Morozov. Aleksey, like Valentin, was also drafted by the Pittsburgh Penguins; Valentin was drafted in the 6th round of the 1994 NHL Entry Draft, and Aleksey was drafted the following year (1st round, 24th overall) in the 1995 NHL Entry Draft.

== Career statistics ==
			Regular season					Playoffs
Season	Team	League	GP	G	A	Pts	PIM	GP	G	A	Pts	PIM
1992–93	CSKA Moscow	IHL	17	0	0	0	6	—	—	—	—	—
1992–93	CSKA–2 Moscow	RUS.2	34	4	4	8	16	—	—	—	—	—
1993–94	CSKA Moscow	IHL	18	4	1	5	8	3	0	1	1	0
1993–94	CSKA–2 Moscow	RUS.2	3	0	0	0	0	—	—	—	—	—
1994–95	CSKA Moscow	IHL	47	9	4	13	102	—	—	—	—	—
1994–95	CSKA–2 Moscow	RUS.2	4	4	3	7	2	—	—	—	—	—
1995–96	CSKA Moscow	IHL	51	30	11	41	28	3	1	0	1	2
1995–96	CSKA–2 Moscow	RUS.2	4	4	3	7	2	—	—	—	—	—
1996–97	CSKA Moscow	RUS.2	4	2	1	3	0	—	—	—	—	—
1996–97	CSKA–2 Moscow	RUS.3	2	1	1	2	0	—	—	—	—	—
1996–97	CSKA Moscow	RSL	22	8	5	13	8	—	—	—	—	—
1997–98	Krylya Sovetov Moscow	RSL	34	5	15	20	8	—	—	—	—	—
1997–98	Krylya Sovetov–2 Moscow	RUS.3	5	1	2	3	2	—	—	—	—	—
1998–99	Syracuse Crunch	AHL	63	17	23	40	10	—	—	—	—	—
1999–2000	Wilkes-Barre/Scranton Penguins	AHL	59	14	25	39	4	—	—	—	—	—
2000–01	Lada Togliatti	RSL	19	0	4	4	6	—	—	—	—	—
2001–02	Salavat Yulaev Ufa	RSL	1	0	0	0	0	—	—	—	—	—
2001–02	Severstal–2 Cherepovets	RUS.3	4	6	3	9	0	—	—	—	—	—
2001–02	CSKA Moscow	RSL	19	4	4	8	2	—	—	—	—	—
2001–02	CSKA–2 Moscow	RUS.3	1	0	0	0	0	—	—	—	—	—
2002–03	Khimik Voskresensk	RUS.2	24	12	8	20	16	14	6	4	10	2
2002–03	Khimik–2 Voskresensk	RUS.3	1	0	2	2	0	—	—	—	—	—
2003–04	Krylya Sovetov Moscow	RUS.2	29	3	12	15	22	2	1	0	1	0
2003–04	Krylya Sovetov–2 Moscow	RUS.3	4	2	1	3	0	—	—	—	—	—
IHL totals			133	43	16	59	144	6	1	1	2	2
RUS.2 totals			104	31	29	60	56	16	7	4	11	2
RSL totals			95	17	28	45	24	—	—	—	—	—
