= 1994–95 Open Russian Championship season =

Russian ice hockey league season

The 1994–95 Open Russian Championship season was the third season of the Open Championship, the second-level ice hockey league in Russia. Neftechimik Nizhnekamsk won the championship by defeating Zapolyarnik Norilsk in the final.

== First round ==
=== Central Zone ===
	Club	GP	W	T	L	GF	GA	Pts
1.	Dizelist Penza	22	17	3	2	93	42	37
2.	Olimpiya Kirovo-Chepetsk	22	16	3	3	86	50	35
3.	Zvezda Tver	22	13	4	5	81	70	30
4.	Dynamo Moscow II	22	13	2	7	70	55	28
5.	Keramik Elektrostal	22	9	3	10	65	71	21
6.	CSKA Moscow II	22	8	5	9	70	74	19
7.	Krylya Sovetov Moscow II	22	7	5	10	62	69	18
8.	Buran Voronezh	22	7	4	11	67	81	18
9.	HK Lipetsk	22	8	2	12	63	71	18
10.	Torpedo Yaroslavl II	22	6	5	11	50	64	17
11.	Severstal Cherepovets II	22	3	5	14	48	86	11
12.	Torpedo Nizhny Novgorod II	22	3	3	16	47	77	9

=== West Zone ===
	Club	GP	W	T	L	GF	GA	Pts
1.	Komineft Nizhny Odes	36	32	2	2	219	52	66
2.	Gornyak Olenegorsk	36	23	7	6	165	76	53
3.	Polimir Novopolotsk	36	25	2	9	142	101	52
4.	Neman Grodno	36	22	7	7	144	92	51
5.	ShVSM Sokol Kiev	36	12	7	17	96	106	31
6.	Tekhnolog Ukhta	36	12	5	19	98	130	29
7.	SKA St. Petersburg II	36	11	5	20	104	147	27
8.	Puls Petrosavodsk	36	10	6	20	95	159	26
9.	Izhorets St. Petersburg	36	7	4	25	91	166	18
10.	Yunost Minsk	36	2	3	31	83	208	7

=== Volga Zone ===
	Club	GP	W	T	L	GF	GA	Pts
1.	Neftekhimik Nizhnekamsk	32	27	2	3	185	72	56
2.	Neftyanik Almetyevsk	32	22	3	7	116	75	47
3.	Rossiya Krasnokamsk	32	19	1	12	146	113	39
4.	Lada Togliatti II	32	16	2	14	150	107	34
5.	Sokol Novocheboksarsk	32	14	3	15	101	108	31
6.	Progress Glazov	32	14	2	16	136	137	30
7.	Toros Neftekamsk	32	11	2	19	129	146	24
8.	Itil Kazan	32	8	1	23	75	146	17
9.	Khimik Engels	32	4	2	26	71	206	10

=== Ural Zone ===
	Club	GP	W	T	L	GF	GA	Pts
1.	Mechel Chelyabinsk	48	36	5	7	246	97	77
2.	Metallurg Novotroitsk	48	35	5	8	295	135	75
3.	Kedr Novouralsk	48	28	7	13	216	154	63
4.	Novoil Ufa	48	28	6	14	171	117	62
5.	Kholmogorets Noyabrsk	48	24	9	15	162	125	57
6.	Sputnik Nizhny Tagil	48	24	8	16	193	142	56
7.	UralAZ Miass	48	25	4	19	171	174	54
8.	Bulat Temirtau	48	21	6	21	175	158	48
9.	Metallurg Serov	48	15	6	27	155	211	36
10.	Metallurg Magnitogorsk II	48	13	8	27	150	204	34
11.	SKA-Avto Yekaterinburg II	48	13	2	33	160	202	28
12.	Rubin Tyumen II	48	7	4	37	106	306	18
13.	Yuzhny Ural Orsk	48	7	2	39	86	261	16

=== Siberian-Far Eastern Zone ===
==== Group I ====
	Club	GP	W	T	L	GF	GA	Pts
1.	SK GSU Belovo	36	25	4	7	173	96	54
2.	Shakhtyor Prokopyevsk	36	23	4	9	152	86	50
3.	Avangard Omsk II	36	19	7	10	126	94	45
4.	Motor Barnaul	36	21	3	12	128	103	45
5.	Metallurg Achinsk	36	20	4	12	134	112	44
6.	Sibruda Tashtagol	36	17	4	15	131	119	38
7.	Yantar Seversk	36	15	1	20	130	131	31
8.	Torpedo Ust-Kamenogorsk II	36	11	7	18	143	161	29
9.	Metallurg Novokuznetsk II	36	6	4	26	79	170	16
10.	Sibir Novosibirsk II	36	3	2	31	83	237	8

==== Group II ====
	Club	GP	W	T	L	GF	GA	Pts
1.	SKA Khabarovsk	24	18	5	1	137	53	41
2.	Zapolyarnik Norilsk	24	14	6	4	124	71	34
3.	Gornyak Raychikhinsk	24	6	6	12	81	121	18
4.	Ermak Angarsk	24	1	1	22	58	154	3

== Second round ==
=== Central-Volga Zone ===
	Club	GP	W	T	L	GF	GA	Pts
1.	Dizelist Penza	20	14	3	3	79	41	31
2.	Olimpiya Kirovo-Chepetsk	20	15	1	4	86	49	31
3.	Neftekhimik Nizhnekamsk	20	13	3	4	78	47	29
4.	Komineft Nizhny Odes	20	11	5	4	80	48	27
5.	Neftyanik Almetyevsk	20	12	3	5	74	50	27
6.	Buran Voronezh	20	11	1	8	88	71	23
7.	Sokol Novocheboksarsk	20	8	2	10	56	60	18
8.	Lada Togliatti II	20	5	3	12	63	87	13
9.	HC Lipetsk	20	4	2	14	55	91	10
10.	Progress Glazov	20	2	3	15	50	103	7
11.	Rossiya Krasnokamsk	20	2	0	18	40	102	4

=== West Zone ===
	Club	GP	W	T	L	GF	GA	Pts
1.	Gornyak Olenegorsk	16	9	5	2	64	43	23
2.	Neman Grodno	16	9	2	5	62	43	20
3.	Polimir Novopolotsk	16	7	2	7	57	52	16
4.	Tekhnolog Ukhta	16	7	0	9	59	53	14
5.	Puls Petrosabodsk	16	2	3	11	18	69	7

=== Ural Zone ===
==== 1/8 Finals ====
- Metallurg Serov – Metallurg Magnitogorsk II 2:1 (1:4, 9:0, 4:3)
- Sputnik Nizhny Tagil – Rubin Tyumen II 2:0 (6:2, +:-)
- Cholmogorez Noyabrsk – Yuzhny Ural Orsk 1:2 (6:3, -:+, -:+)
- UralAZ Miass – SKA Avto Yekaterinburg II 2:1 (1:5, 6:4, 3:1)

==== Quarterfinals ====
- Kedr Novouralsk – Metallurg Serov 0:2 (1:2, 4:7)
- Metallurg Nowotroizk – Sputnik Nizhny Tagil 2:0 (4:1, 9:2)
- Nowoil Ufa – Juschny Ural Orsk 2:0 (6:3, 5:0)
- Metschel Tscheljabinsk – UralAZ Miass 2:1 (1:2, 4:1, 5:1)

==== Semifinals ====
- Metallurg Novotroitsk – Metallurg Serov 2:0 (2:1, 10:1)
- Mechel Chelyabinsk – Nowoil Ufa 2:1 (0:1, 5:0, 3:2)

==== 3rd place ====
- Nowoil Ufa – Metallurg Serov 2:1 (1:5, 5:3, 3:1)

==== Final ====
- Mechel Chelyabinsk – Metallurg Novotroitsk 3:2 (3:8, 1:4, 3:1, 7:2, 3:1)

==== Placing round ====
5th-8th place

Placing round
3	Kedr Novouralsk	0
6	Sputnik Nizhny Tagil	2
7	UralAZ Miass	2
13	Yuzhny Ural Orsk	0

5th place
6	Sputnik Nizhny Tagil	1
7	UralAZ Miass	2
7th place
3	Kedr Novouralsk	2
13	Yuzhny Ural Orsk	0

9th place

- SKA Avto Yekaterinburg II – Metallurg Magnitogorsk II 0:2 (1:3, 1:4)

=== Siberian-Far Eastern Zone ===
	Club	GP	W	T	L	GF	GA	Pts
1.	Zapolyarnik Norilsk	22	19	3	0	128	34	41
2.	SKA Khabarovsk	22	18	0	4	106	44	36
3.	SK GSU Belovo	22	14	2	6	85	71	30
4.	Ermak Angarsk	22	14	0	8	68	65	28
5.	Yantar Seversk	22	12	2	8	55	53	26
6.	Motor Barnaul	22	11	3	8	63	61	25
7.	Shakhtyor Prokopyevsk	22	11	2	9	60	58	24
8.	Metallurg Achinsk	22	8	1	13	68	65	17
9.	Avangard Omsk II	22	6	2	14	50	84	14
10.	Gornyak Raychikhinsk	22	6	0	16	64	80	12
11.	Sibruda Tashtagol	22	3	2	17	35	76	8
12.	Sibir Novosibirsk II	22	1	1	20	49	140	3

== Playoffs ==
=== 1/8 Finals ===
- Zapolyarnik Norilsk – UralAZ Miass 2:0 (5:2, +:-)
- Metallurg Novotroitsk – SK GSU Belovo 2:1 (4:5, 10:2, 9:2)
- Mechel Chelyabinsk – Ermak Angarsk 2:1 (2:3, 9:1, 8:2)
- SKA Khabarovsk – Cholmogorez Noyabrsk 2:1 (1:7, 6:1, 5:1)
- Dizelist Penza – Neftyanik Almetyevsk 2:1 (0:3, 2:0, 5:1)
- Olimpiya Kirovo-Chepetsk – Nowoil Ufa 2:0 (8:2, +:-)
- Gornyak Olenegorsk – Buran Voronezh 2:1 (5:7, 4:1, 9:2)
- Neftekhimik Nizhnekamsk – Komineft Nizhny Odes 2:0 (4:2, 5:3)

=== Quarterfinals ===
- Zapolyarnik Norilsk – Metallurg Novotroitsk 2:0 (3:2, +:-)
- Mechel Chelyabinsk – SKA Khabarovsk 2:1 (2:6, 4:2, 7:1)
- Dizelist Penza – Olimpiya Kirovo-Chepetsk 2:1 (3:5, 1:0, 6:1)
- Gornyak Olenegorsk – Neftekhimik Nizhnekamsk 0:2 (3:15, -:+)

=== Semifinals ===
- Zapolyarnik Norilsk – Mechel Chelyabinsk 2:1 (3:5, 7:1, 4:3)
- Dizelist Penza – Neftekhimik Nizhnekamsk 0:2 (3:4 SO, 2:4)

=== Final ===
- Zapolyarnik Norilsk – Neftekhimik Nizhnekamsk 1:3 (2:3, 4:5, 4:3, 5:6 OT)
