= Yan Golubovsky =

Russian ice hockey player (born 1976)

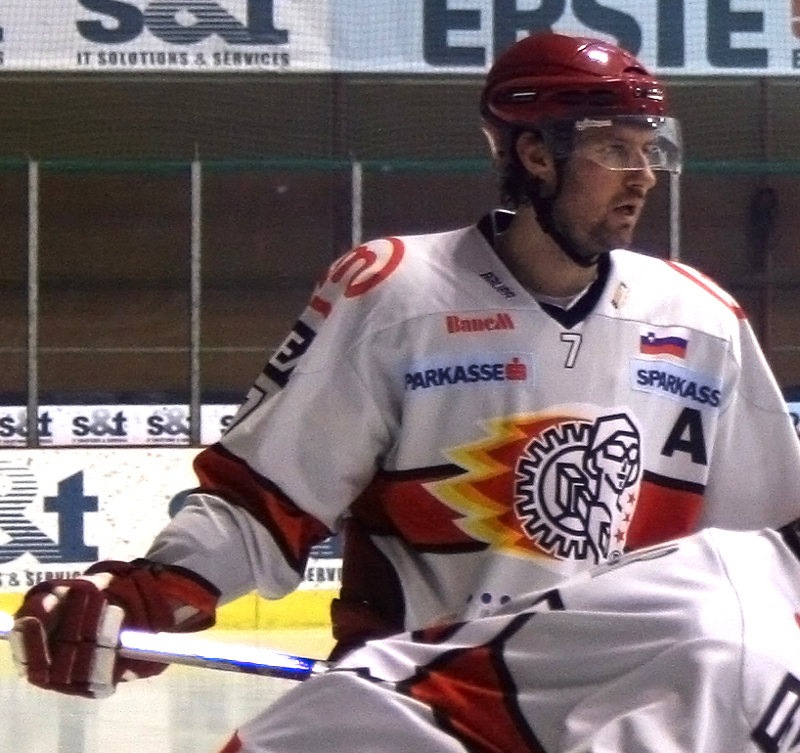
- Born: March 9, 1976 (age 50) Novosibirsk, Soviet Union
- Height: 6 ft 4 in (193 cm)
- Weight: 209 lb (95 kg; 14 st 13 lb)
- Position: Defence
- Shot: Right
- Played for: SKA Saint Petersburg; Severstal Cherepovets; CSKA Moscow; Metallurg Magnitogorsk; Florida Panthers; Detroit Red Wings; Leksands IF; Junost Minsk; HK Acroni Jesenice
- NHL draft: 23rd overall, 1994; Detroit Red Wings
- Playing career: 1993–2012

Yan Valerievich Golubovsky (Russian: Ян Валерьевич Голубовский; born March 9, 1976) is a Russian former professional ice hockey player.

== Draft ==
He was drafted 1st (23rd overall) by the Detroit Red Wings in the 1994 NHL entry draft.

== Playing career ==
In early 1993, Golubovsky played as a defenceman for Dynamo Moscow's second team and was noticed early on. He made the jump later that season to the touring Russian Penguins of the IHL and was drafted by the Detroit Red Wings in 1994. He spent three full years in the AHL with the Adirondack Red Wings before finally being called up to play for the Detroit Red Wings in 1997. However, his NHL debut was short-lived as he did not develop as much as the team hoped, causing Golubovsky to split his time between the AHL and NHL. The following three seasons saw the same for Yan, being called up to the NHL, only to be sent back down after a handful of games.

On December 28, 2000, he was traded to the Florida Panthers for center Igor Larionov, but continued to split time between the NHL and AHL within the Panthers organization.

In 2001, Golubovsky signed with Magnitogorsk Metallurg of the RSL and spent the next four years being shuttled between teams. After stints with CSKA Moscow, Cherepovets Severstal, and SKA Saint Petersburg, he signed a contract to play for Leksands IF of the Swedish Elite League for the 05–06 season.

== Post-playing career ==
On 22 June 2021, he was officially deemed a fugitive from justice after missing a court date. He was charged with misappropriation of 17 million rubles (approximately 200,000 euros) while working as the general director of Torpedo Nizhny Novgorod.

== Career statistics ==
			Regular season					Playoffs
Season	Team	League	GP	G	A	Pts	PIM	GP	G	A	Pts	PIM
1992–93	Dynamo–2 Moscow	RUS.2	41	1	0	1	20	—	—	—	—	—
1993–94	Dynamo–2 Moscow	RUS.2	36	3	2	5	56	—	—	—	—	—
1994–95	Adirondack Red Wings	AHL	57	4	2	6	39	—	—	—	—	—
1995–96	Adirondack Red Wings	AHL	71	5	16	21	97	3	0	0	0	2
1996–97	Adirondack Red Wings	AHL	62	2	11	13	67	4	0	0	0	0
1997–98	Adirondack Red Wings	AHL	52	1	15	16	57	3	0	0	0	2
1997–98	Detroit Red Wings	NHL	12	0	2	2	6	—	—	—	—	—
1998–99	Detroit Red Wings	NHL	17	0	1	1	16	—	—	—	—	—
1998–99	Adirondack Red Wings	AHL	43	2	2	4	32	2	0	0	0	4
1999–2000	Detroit Red Wings	NHL	21	1	2	3	8	—	—	—	—	—
2000–01	Florida Panthers	NHL	6	0	2	2	2	—	—	—	—	—
2000–01	Cincinnati Mighty Ducks	AHL	28	4	4	8	16	—	—	—	—	—
2000–01	Louisville Panthers	AHL	30	1	12	13	36	—	—	—	—	—
2001–02	Metallurg Magnitogorsk	RSL	9	0	1	1	10	—	—	—	—	—
2001–02	Sibir Novosibirsk	RUS.2	31	6	8	14	50	11	1	1	2	14
2002–03	CSKA Moscow	RSL	22	0	3	3	26	—	—	—	—	—
2003–04	Severstal Cherepovets	RSL	4	0	1	1	4	—	—	—	—	—
2003–04	Severstal–2 Cherepovets	RUS.3	10	2	3	5	20	—	—	—	—	—
2003–04	SKA Saint Petersburg	RSL	33	2	9	11	16	—	—	—	—	—
2004–05	SKA Saint Petersburg	RSL	46	0	8	8	38	—	—	—	—	—
2005–06	Leksands IF	SEL	31	1	1	2	22	—	—	—	—	—
2008–09	Yunost Minsk	BLR	21	1	8	9	44	14	3	3	6	44
2009–10	HK Acroni Jesenice	AUT	51	4	20	24	118	—	—	—	—	—
2009–10	HK Acroni Jesenice	SVN	4	0	1	1	0	6	1	3	4	28
2011–12	Pingouins de Morzine-Avoriaz	FRA	24	2	3	5	30	5	2	1	3	12
2012–13	HC Ryazan	VHL	11	1	0	1	26	—	—	—	—	—
AHL totals			343	19	62	81	344	12	0	0	0	8
NHL totals			56	1	7	8	32	—	—	—	—	—
RSL totals			114	2	22	24	94	—	—	—	—	—

Preceded by Anders Eriksson	Detroit Red Wings first-round draft pick 1994	Succeeded by Maxim Kuznetsov
