= 2005 Rosno Cup =

Tournament details
- Host countries: Russia; Czech Republic
- Cities: Moscow; Prague
- Venues: 2 (in 2 host cities)
- Dates: 15–18 December 2005
- Teams: 4

Final positions
- Champions: Russia (9th title)
- Runners-up: Finland
- Third place: Sweden
- Fourth place: Czech Republic

Tournament statistics
- Games played: 6
- Goals scored: 19 (3.17 per game)
- Attendance: 50,751 (8,459 per game)
- Scoring leader: (Russia) Maxim Sushinsky (5 points)

Awards
- MVP: (Russia) Maxim Sushinsky

The 2005 Rosno Cup was played between 15 and 18 December 2005. The Czech Republic, Finland, Sweden and Russia played a round-robin for a total of three games per team and six games in total. Five of the matches were played in the Khodynka Arena in Moscow, Russia and one match in Sazka Arena in Prague, Czech Republic. The tournament was part of the 2005–06 Euro Hockey Tour.

Russia won the tournament.

== Standings ==
Pos	Team	Pld	W	OTW	SOW	OTL	SOL	L	GF	GA	GD	Pts
1	Russia	3	3	0	0	0	0	0	8	2	+6	9
2	Finland	3	1	0	1	0	0	1	5	5	0	5
3	Sweden	3	0	1	0	0	0	2	3	5	−2	2
4	Czech Republic	3	0	0	0	1	1	1	3	7	−4	2

Source: swehockey

== Games ==
All times are local. Moscow – (Moscow Time – UTC+4) Prague – (Central European Time – UTC+1)

15 December 2005; 17:00	Czech Republic	2-3 GWS (1-0, 1-1, 0-1) (OT: 0–0) (SO: 0–1)	Finland	Sazka Arena, Prague; Attendance: 7,245

Game reference

Adam Svoboda
Goalies
Fredrik Norrena
Referee:
(Sweden) Marcus Vinnerborg
Linesmen:
(Czech Republic) Petr Blümel
(Czech Republic) Roman Pouzar

Marek (Rachůnek) – 04:04	1-0
Hořava (Moravec) – 28:05	2-0
	2-1	36:09 – Santala (Hentunen) (PP)
	2-2	58:41 – Peltonen (Hahl) (PP)

Vlasák (miss)
Shootout
Peltonen
14 min
Penalties
6 min
31
Shots
29

15 December 2005; 19:00	Sweden	1-3 (0-2, 1-0, 0-1)	Russia	Khodynka Arena, Moscow; Attendance: 8,200

Game reference

Stefan Liv
Goalies
Maxim Sokolov
Referee:
(Czech Republic) Vladimir Sindler

	0-1	03:38 – Sushinsky (Kharitonov, Bykov) (PP)
	0-2	12:21 – Semin (Titov, Korolyuk)
Lundqvist (Karlsson, Melin) – 24:28	1-2
	1-3	59:25 – But (Gusev, Titov) (EN)

20 min
Penalties
12 min
27
Shots
20

17 December 2005; 13:00	Sweden	1-0 OT (0-0, 0-0, 0-0) (OT: 0–1)	Czech Republic	Khodynka Arena, Moscow; Attendance: 8,200

Game reference
Daniel Henriksson	Goalies	Marek Pinc	Referee: (Russia) Aleksei Ravodin
Karlsson (Johansson, Jonsson) – 63:49 / 1-0			Referee: (Russia) Aleksei Ravodin
12 min	Penalties	8 min	Referee: (Russia) Aleksei Ravodin
20	Shots	29	Referee: (Russia) Aleksei Ravodin

17 December 2005; 17:00	Russia	2-0 (0-0, 1-0, 1-0)	Finland	Khodynka Arena, Moscow; Attendance: 11,500

Game reference
Maxim Sokolov	Goalies	Niklas Bäckström	Referee: (Czech Republic) Vladimir Sindler
Sushinsky (Kharitonov, Malkin) – 31:55 / 1-0; Sushinsky (Kharitonov, Bykov) (EN) – 59:27 / 2-0			Referee: (Czech Republic) Vladimir Sindler
14 min	Penalties	22 min	Referee: (Czech Republic) Vladimir Sindler
41	Shots	17	Referee: (Czech Republic) Vladimir Sindler

18 December 2005; 13:00	Finland	2-1 (0-0, 1-1, 1-0)	Sweden	Khodynka Arena, Moscow; Attendance: 4,100

Game reference

Fredrik Norrena
Goalies
Daniel Henriksson
Referee:
(Russia) Sergei Karabanov

Tarvainen (Hyvönen, Pirnes) – 31:20	1-0
	1-1	34:19 – Johansson (Eriksson)
Peltonen (Hentunen) – 59:30	2-1

37 min
Penalties
14 min
26
Shots
29

18 December 2005; 17:00	Russia	3-1 (3-0, 0-0, 0-1)	Czech Republic	Khodynka Arena, Moscow; Attendance: 11,506

Game reference

Maxim Sokolov
Goalies
Adam Svoboda
Referee:
(Finland) Jari Levonen

Malkin (Sushinsky, Kharitonov) – 04:09	1-0
Malkin (Sushinsky, Kharitonov) – 07:26	2-0
But (Kulyash) – 18:53	3-0
	3-1	44:02 – Kudrna (Rachůnek)

14 min
Penalties
12 min
26
Shots
26

== Scoring leaders ==
Pos	Player	Country	GP	G	A	Pts	+/−	PIM	POS
1	Maxim Sushinsky	Russia	3	3	2	5	+4	0	LD
2	Alexander Kharitonov	Sweden	3	0	4	4	+4	2	LW
3	Ville Peltonen	Finland	3	3	0	3	+1	0	LW
4	Evgeni Malkin	Russia	3	2	1	3	+5	0	CE
5	Anton But	Russia	3	2	0	2	+2	0	LW

GP = Games played; G = Goals; A = Assists; Pts = Points; +/− = Plus/minus; PIM = Penalties in minutes; POS = Position
Source: swehockey

== Goaltending leaders ==
Pos	Player	Country	TOI	GA	GAA	Sv%	SO
1	Marek Pinc	Czech Republic	103:49	1	0.58	97.30	0
2	Maxim Sokolov	Russia	180:00	2	0.67	97.14	1
3	Daniel Henriksson	Sweden	123:24	2	0.97	96.43	1
4	Fredrik Norrena	Finland	125:00	3	1.44	94.92	0
5	Adam Svoboda	Czech Republic	85:01	6	4.23	84.21	0

TOI = Time on ice (minutes:seconds); SA = Shots against; GA = Goals against; GAA = Goals Against Average; Sv% = Save percentage; SO = Shutouts
Source: swehockey

== Tournament awards ==
The tournament directorate named the following players in the tournament 2005:

- Best goalkeeper: (Russia) Maksim Sokolov
- Best defenceman: (Finland) Tuukka Mäntylä
- Best forward: (Russia) Evgeni Malkin
- Most Valuable Player: (Russia) Maxim Sushinsky
