= Shakhtyor Prokopyevsk =

Shakhtyor Prokopyevsk may refer to the following teams based or formerly based in Prokopyevsk, Kemerovo Oblast, Russia:

- FC Shakhtyor Prokopyevsk, an association football club
- HC Shakhtyor Prokopyevsk, an ice hockey club
