= Oleg Belov =

Russian ice hockey player (born 1973)

- Born: April 20, 1973 (age 53) Moscow, Russian SFSR, Soviet Union
- Height: 6 ft 0 in (183 cm)
- Weight: 200 lb (91 kg; 14 st 4 lb)
- Position: Right wing
- Shot: Left
- Played for: Metallurg Novokuznetsk; Amur Khabarovsk; Sibir Novosibirsk; Metallurg Magnitogorsk; Rapperswil-Jona Lakers; HV71; HC Bolzano Bozen; EHC Chur; Long Beach Ice Dogs; Cleveland Lumberjacks; CSKA Moskva; Russian Penguins
- NHL draft: 102nd overall, 1995; Pittsburgh Penguins
- Playing career: 1991–2010

Oleg Ivanovich Belov (Russian: Олег Иванович Белов; born April 20, 1973) is a Russian former ice hockey winger.

== Career ==
He was drafted by the Pittsburgh Penguins in the 4th round (102nd overall) in the 1995 NHL entry draft. Prior to being drafted by the Penguins, Belov was a member of the Russian Penguins, a touring Russian team that competed in exhibition games against other International Hockey League teams.

Belov has spent the majority of his career playing for HV71 of the Swedish Elitserien and Sibir Novosibirsk of the then-Russian Super League, where he was captain for two seasons (2005–07).

Belov most recently played for Metallurg Novokuznetsk during the 2009-10 KHL season.

== Career statistics ==
=== Regular season and playoffs ===
			Regular season					Playoffs
Season	Team	League	GP	G	A	Pts	PIM	GP	G	A	Pts	PIM
1990–91	Kord Schyokino	URS-3	4	0	0	0	0	—	—	—	—	—
1991–92	CSKA–2 Moscow	CIS-3	45	16	9	25	22	—	—	—	—	—
1991–92	CSKA Moscow	CIS	—	—	—	—	—	1	0	0	0	2
1992–93	CSKA Moscow	RUS	42	7	4	11	18	—	—	—	—	—
1992–93	CSKA–2 Moscow	RUS-2	6	1	1	2	4	—	—	—	—	—
1993–94	CSKA Moscow	RUS	46	14	8	22	18	3	1	0	1	2
1993–94	Russian Penguins	IHL	11	3	2	5	10	—	—	—	—	—
1994–95	CSKA Moscow	RUS	46	21	18	39	51	—	—	—	—	—
1995–96	Cleveland Lumberjacks	IHL	68	14	15	29	34	3	0	0	0	0
1996–97	Long Beach Ice Dogs	IHL	7	0	1	1	8	—	—	—	—	—
1996–97	EHC Chur	SUI-2	25	23	20	43	39	3	2	1	3	0
1997–98	HV71	SEL	42	11	13	24	30	3	1	0	1	4
1998–99	HV71	SEL	16	6	6	12	10	—	—	—	—	—
1998–99	HC Bolzano	ITA	2	2	0	2	12	—	—	—	—	—
1999–2000	HV71	SEL	49	16	21	37	53	6	0	1	1	0
2000–01	HV71	SEL	47	9	14	23	10	—	—	—	—	—
2001–02	HV71	SEL	34	7	10	17	12	—	—	—	—	—
2001–02	SC Rapperswil–Jona	NLA	7	0	3	3	0	—	—	—	—	—
2002–03	Metallurg Magnitogorsk	RSL	41	4	8	12	4	3	0	0	0	2
2002–03	Metallurg–2 Magnitogorsk	RUS-3	2	1	1	2	0	—	—	—	—	—
2003–04	Sibir Novosibirsk	RSL	58	9	16	25	36	—	—	—	—	—
2004–05	Sibir Novosibirsk	RSL	58	8	8	16	34	—	—	—	—	—
2005–06	Sibir Novosibirsk	RSL	58	8	9	17	26	4	0	2	2	6
2006–07	Sibir Novosibirsk	RSL	46	5	20	25	59	7	0	0	0	2
2007–08	Sibir Novosibirsk	RSL	46	9	12	21	28	—	—	—	—	—
2007–08	Sibir–2 Novosibirsk	RUS-3	2	1	1	2	2	—	—	—	—	—
2008–09	Amur Khabarovsk	KHL	38	7	9	16	28	—	—	—	—	—
2009–10	Metallurg Novokuznetsk	KHL	23	1	7	8	10	—	—	—	—	—
RUS & RSL totals			434	85	103	188	274	17	1	2	3	12
SEL totals			188	49	64	113	115	9	1	1	2	4
KHL totals			61	8	16	24	38	—	—	—	—	—

=== International ===
Year	Team	Event	GP	G	A	Pts	PIM
1991	Soviet Union	EJC	6	0	3	3	6
1993	Russia	WJC	7	1	2	3	2
1995	Russia	WC	6	2	1	3	2
1997	Russia	WC	8	2	3	5	6
1998	Russia	WC	6	1	1	2	12
Junior totals			13	1	5	6	8
Senior totals			20	5	5	10	20
