= Alexander Titov =

Alexander Titov may refer to:

- Alexander Titov (conductor) (born 1954), Russian conductor working regularly with orchestras in St Petersburg, Moscow, and with the BBC Scottish Symphony Orchestra
- Alexander Titov (ice hockey) (born 1975), retired Russian ice hockey defenceman
- Alexander Titov (rock musician) (born 1957), Russian rock musician
