= Alexander Kharitonov (ice hockey) =

Russian ice hockey player

- Born: March 30, 1976 (age 50) Moscow, Russian SFSR, Soviet Union
- Height: 5 ft 9 in (175 cm)
- Weight: 169 lb (77 kg; 12 st 1 lb)
- Position: Left wing
- Shot: Right
- Played for: Tampa Bay Lightning; New York Islanders; Avangard Omsk; Dynamo Moscow; Torpedo Nizhny Novgorod; Sibir Novosibirsk
- National team: Russia
- NHL draft: 81st overall, 2000; Tampa Bay Lightning
- Playing career: 1993–2012

Alexander Yevgenievich Kharitonov (Russian: Александр Евгеньевич Харитонов, born March 30, 1976) is a Russian former professional ice hockey right wing.

== Career ==
Kharitonov was drafted in the third round, 81st overall, by the Tampa Bay Lightning in the 2000 NHL entry draft from HC Dynamo Moscow at the age of 24. He signed with the Lightning for the 2000-01 NHL season and played in sixty-six games in his rookie season, scoring seven goals and fifteen assists for twenty-two points. The following year, Kharitonov signed with the New York Islanders, but played just five games for the team as well as two games for the Bridgeport Sound Tigers of the American Hockey League before returning to Russia to play for Avangard Omsk.

Kharitonov later returned to Dynamo Moscow in 2003 and played the next five seasons with the team before joining Torpedo Nizhny Novgorod in the newly created Kontinental Hockey League in 2008. He later joined HC Sibir Novosibirsk the following year before spending the final two seasons of his career in the Supreme Hockey League for Rubin Tyumen and in the Professional Hockey League in Ukraine for Sokil Kiev.

Kharitonov was also a member of the Russian national team, playing in five World Championships as well as the 2006 Winter Olympics.

== Personal life ==
Before the 2006 Olympic Games, Kharitonov joined the United Russia party.

== Career statistics ==
=== Regular season and playoffs ===
			Regular season					Playoffs
Season	Team	League	GP	G	A	Pts	PIM	GP	G	A	Pts	PIM
1993–94	Vyatich Ryazan	RUS.2	44	19	8	27	12	—	—	—	—	—
1994–95	Dynamo Moscow	IHL	10	0	0	0	0	—	—	—	—	—
1994–95	Dynamo–2 Moscow	RUS.2	39	16	9	25	18	—	—	—	—	—
1995–96	Dynamo–2 Moscow	RUS.2	3	1	3	4	4	—	—	—	—	—
1995–96	HK Lipetsk	RUS.2	64	30	22	52	44	—	—	—	—	—
1996–97	Dynamo Moscow	RSL	36	11	9	20	12	4	2	0	2	2
1996–97	Dynamo–2 Moscow	RUS.3	2	1	1	2	0	—	—	—	—	—
1997–98	Dynamo Moscow	RSL	44	18	17	35	20	12	2	3	5	4
1998–99	Dynamo Moscow	RSL	42	8	6	14	24	16	4	3	7	2
1999–2000	Dynamo Moscow	RSL	35	13	22	35	26	17	8	3	11	10
2000–01	Tampa Bay Lightning	NHL	66	7	15	22	8	—	—	—	—	—
2001–02	Bridgeport Sound Tigers	AHL	2	1	0	1	0	—	—	—	—	—
2001–02	New York Islanders	NHL	5	0	0	0	4	—	—	—	—	—
2001–02	Avangard Omsk	RSL	29	2	6	8	16	4	1	0	1	2
2002–03	Avangard Omsk	RSL	43	8	10	18	34	9	2	0	2	4
2003–04	Dynamo Moscow	RSL	51	7	14	21	24	3	0	0	0	2
2003–04	Dynamo–2 Moscow	RUS.3	1	0	1	1	2	—	—	—	—	—
2004–05	Dynamo Moscow	RSL	49	15	14	29	26	10	3	1	4	0
2005–06	Dynamo Moscow	RSL	41	10	15	25	30	4	1	0	1	2
2006–07	Dynamo Moscow	RSL	52	12	24	36	62	3	1	0	1	0
2007–08	Dynamo Moscow	RSL	54	11	15	26	48	9	0	2	2	2
2008–09	Torpedo Nizhny Novgorod	KHL	55	7	22	29	26	3	0	0	0	0
2009–10	Sibir Novosibirsk	KHL	48	3	10	13	24	—	—	—	—	—
2010–11	Rubin Tyumen	VHL	41	8	8	16	40	8	1	3	4	4
2011–12	Sokil Kyiv	UKR	7	1	1	2	2	—	—	—	—	—
RSL totals			476	115	152	267	322	91	24	12	36	30
NHL totals			71	7	15	22	12	—	—	—	—	—
KHL totals			103	10	32	42	50	3	0	0	0	0

=== International ===
Year	Team	Event	Result	GP	G	A	Pts	PIM
2000	Russia	WC	11th	6	2	3	5	2
2001	Russia	WC	6th	7	2	0	2	8
2005	Russia	WC	3rd place, bronze medalist(s)	8	2	0	2	4
2006	Russia	OG	4th	8	1	1	2	6
2006	Russia	WC	5th	4	1	0	1	2
2007	Russia	WC	3rd place, bronze medalist(s)	9	0	2	2	6
Senior totals				42	8	6	14	28

== Honours ==
- Russian Superleague: 2000
- Russian Superleague: 2005
- Euro Hockey Tour: 2005, 2006
- IIHF European Champions Cup: 2006
- Ceska Pojistovna Cup: 2006
- Karjala Tournament: 2006
- Channel One Cup: 2006
