= 2001 Stanley Cup playoffs =

Tournament details
- Dates: April 11–June 9, 2001
- Teams: 16
- Defending champions: New Jersey Devils

Final positions
- Champions: Colorado Avalanche
- Runners-up: New Jersey Devils

Tournament statistics
- Scoring leader(s): Joe Sakic (Avalanche) (26 points)

Awards
- MVP: Patrick Roy (Avalanche)

The 2001 Stanley Cup playoffs, the playoff tournament of the National Hockey League (NHL), began on April 11, 2001, and ended on June 9, 2001, when the Western Conference champion Colorado Avalanche defeated the defending champion New Jersey Devils to win their second Stanley Cup.

Defenceman Ray Bourque, who had a 21-year tenure in Boston, won his first Stanley Cup in his final professional year. Joe Sakic, Swedish center Peter Forsberg, defenceman Rob Blake, and goalkeeper Patrick Roy claimed the Stanley Cup for the final time in their careers. Roy was also awarded the Conn Smythe Trophy, his third, the most by any player. No hat tricks were scored in the 2001 playoffs and goaltenders combined for a record 19 shutouts. This was the first of ten consecutive seasons in which the Florida Panthers missed the playoffs, which became the longest playoff drought in NHL history (later equaled by the Edmonton Oilers); the record stood until the Buffalo Sabres surpassed it in 2022. This was also the most recent season in which the Boston Bruins and Tampa Bay Lightning missed the playoffs in the same year. To date, this is also the last season in which the two top seeds overall from each Conference made it to the Stanley Cup Final.

== Playoff seeds ==
The top eight teams in each conference qualified for the playoffs. The top three seeds in each conference were awarded to the division winners; while the five remaining spots were awarded to the highest finishers in their respective conferences.

The following teams qualified for the playoffs:

=== Eastern Conference ===
1. New Jersey Devils, Atlantic Division champions, Eastern Conference regular season champions – 111 points
2. Ottawa Senators, Northeast Division champions – 109 points
3. Washington Capitals, Southeast Division champions – 96 points
4. Philadelphia Flyers – 100 points
5. Buffalo Sabres – 98 points
6. Pittsburgh Penguins – 96 points
7. Toronto Maple Leafs – 90 points
8. Carolina Hurricanes – 88 points

=== Western Conference ===
1. Colorado Avalanche, Northwest Division champions, Western Conference regular season champions, Presidents' Trophy winners – 118 points
2. Detroit Red Wings, Central Division champions – 111 points
3. Dallas Stars, Pacific Division champions – 106 points
4. St. Louis Blues – 103 points
5. San Jose Sharks – 95 points
6. Edmonton Oilers – 93 points
7. Los Angeles Kings – 92 points
8. Vancouver Canucks – 90 points

== Playoff bracket ==
In each round, teams competed in a best-of-seven series following a 2–2–1–1–1 format (scores in the bracket indicate the number of games won in each best-of-seven series). The team with home ice advantage played at home for games one and two (and games five and seven, if necessary), and the other team played at home for games three and four (and game six, if necessary). The top eight teams in each conference made the playoffs, with the three division winners seeded 1–3 based on regular season record, and the five remaining teams seeded 4–8.

The NHL used "re-seeding" instead of a fixed bracket playoff system. During the first three rounds, the highest remaining seed in each conference was matched against the lowest remaining seed, the second-highest remaining seed played the second-lowest remaining seed, and so forth. The higher-seeded team was awarded home ice advantage. The two conference winners then advanced to the Stanley Cup Final, where home ice advantage was awarded to the team that had the better regular season record.

Conference quarterfinals	Conference semifinals
1	New Jersey	4
8	Carolina	2
1	New Jersey	4
7	Toronto	3
2	Ottawa	0
7	Toronto	4
Eastern Conference
3	Washington	2
6	Pittsburgh	4
5	Buffalo	3
6	Pittsburgh	4
4	Philadelphia	2
5	Buffalo	4
1	Colorado	4
8	Vancouver	0
1	Colorado	4
7	Los Angeles	3
2	Detroit	2
7	Los Angeles	4
Western Conference
3	Dallas	4
6	Edmonton	2
3	Dallas	0
4	St. Louis	4
4	St. Louis	4
5	San Jose	2

Conference finals
1	New Jersey	4
6	Pittsburgh	1
1	Colorado	4
4	St. Louis	1

Stanley Cup Final
E1	New Jersey	3
W1	Colorado	4

== Conference quarterfinals ==
=== Eastern Conference quarterfinals ===
==== (1) New Jersey Devils vs. (8) Carolina Hurricanes ====
The New Jersey Devils finished first in the Atlantic Division and Eastern Conference during the regular season with 111 points. The Carolina Hurricanes qualified as the eighth seed earning 88 points, winning the tiebreaker against Boston with 38 wins. This was the first playoff meeting between these two teams. New Jersey won this year's four-game regular season series earning five of eight points.

In their next four playoff appearances the Hurricanes did not lose a series in the first two rounds of the playoffs again until 2020.

April 12	Carolina Hurricanes	1–5	New Jersey Devils	Continental Airlines Arena	Recap
No scoring		First period	18:52 – Sergei Brylin (1)
No scoring		Second period	01:25 – Bobby Holik (1); 15:20 – Bobby Holik (2)
Josef Vasicek (1) – 11:27		Third period	05:06 – Petr Sykora (1); 07:01 – Patrik Elias (1)
Arturs Irbe 31 saves / 36 shots		Goalie stats	Martin Brodeur 17 saves / 18 shots

April 15	Carolina Hurricanes	0–2	New Jersey Devils	Continental Airlines Arena	Recap
No scoring		First period	04:16 – Alexander Mogilny (1)
No scoring		Second period	02:32 – Sean O'Donnell (1)
No scoring		Third period	No scoring
Arturs Irbe 27 saves / 29 shots		Goalie stats	Martin Brodeur 18 saves / 18 shots

April 17	New Jersey Devils	4–0	Carolina Hurricanes	Raleigh Entertainment & Sports Arena	Recap
Bobby Holik (3) – 04:44; Scott Gomez (1) – 07:20		First period	No scoring
Randy McKay (1) – 01:35; Brian Rafalski (1) – 04:37		Second period	No scoring
No scoring		Third period	No scoring
Martin Brodeur 16 saves / 16 shots		Goalie stats	Arturs Irbe 20 saves / 24 shots

April 18	New Jersey Devils	2–3	OT	Carolina Hurricanes	Raleigh Entertainment & Sports Arena	Recap
Jason Arnott (1) – pp – 13:10		First period		02:00 – pp – Sami Kapanen (1)
No scoring		Second period		08:23 – pp – David Tanabe (1)
Petr Sykora (2) – sh – 09:31		Third period		No scoring
		First overtime period		00:46 – Rod Brind'Amour (1)
Martin Brodeur 30 saves / 33 shots		Goalie stats		Arturs Irbe 32 saves / 34 shots

April 20	Carolina Hurricanes	3–2	New Jersey Devils	Continental Airlines Arena	Recap
Josef Vasicek (2) – 10:53; Sami Kapanen (2) – 15:09		First period	11:41 – Scott Gomez (2)
No scoring		Second period	No scoring
Jeff O'Neill (1) – 05:47		Third period	19:40 – Bobby Holik (4)
Arturs Irbe 37 saves / 39 shots		Goalie stats	Martin Brodeur 11 saves / 14 shots

April 22	New Jersey Devils	5–1	Carolina Hurricanes	Raleigh Entertainment & Sports Arena	Recap
Patrik Elias (2) – pp – 14:30; Sergei Brylin (2) – 15:51		First period	No scoring
Randy McKay (2) – 17:57		Second period	05:18 – pp – David Tanabe (2)
Randy McKay (3) – 06:00; Alexander Mogilny (2) – 14:27		Third period	No scoring
Martin Brodeur 14 saves / 15 shots		Goalie stats	Arturs Irbe 34 saves / 39 shots

New Jersey won series 4–2

==== (2) Ottawa Senators vs. (7) Toronto Maple Leafs ====
The Ottawa Senators entered the playoffs as the second seed in the Eastern Conference after winning the Northeast Division with 109 points. The Toronto Maple Leafs earned the seventh seed with 90 points. This was the second consecutive playoff meeting and second postseason match-up between these two teams. Their only previous series was in the previous year's Eastern Conference Quarterfinals, which Toronto won in six games. Ottawa won all five games during this year's regular season series.

April 13	Toronto Maple Leafs	1–0	OT	Ottawa Senators	Corel Centre	Recap
No scoring		First period		No scoring
No scoring		Second period		No scoring
No scoring		Third period		No scoring
Mats Sundin (1) – 10:49		First overtime period		No scoring
Curtis Joseph 36 saves / 36 shots		Goalie stats		Patrick Lalime 26 saves / 27 shots

April 14	Toronto Maple Leafs	3–0	Ottawa Senators	Corel Centre	Recap
Sergei Berezin (1) – 02:49		First period	No scoring
Gary Roberts (1) – 09:15		Second period	No scoring
Gary Roberts (2) – 07:12		Third period	No scoring
Curtis Joseph 37 saves / 37 shots		Goalie stats	Patrick Lalime 20 saves / 23 shots

April 16	Ottawa Senators	2–3	OT	Toronto Maple Leafs	Air Canada Centre	Recap
No scoring		First period		07:12 – pp – Mats Sundin (2)
No scoring		Second period		08:18 – pp – Nik Antropov (1)
Marian Hossa (1) – 16:51; Daniel Alfredsson (1) – 19:24		Third period		No scoring
No scoring		First overtime period		02:16 – Cory Cross (1)
Patrick Lalime 23 saves / 26 shots		Goalie stats		Curtis Joseph 26 saves / 28 shots

April 18	Ottawa Senators	1–3	Toronto Maple Leafs	Air Canada Centre	Recap
Chris Phillips (1) – 02:30		First period	08:56 – pp – Yanic Perreault (1); 18:07 – Yanic Perreault (2)
No scoring		Second period	10:19 – Bryan McCabe (1)
No scoring		Third period	No scoring
Patrick Lalime 20 saves / 23 shots		Goalie stats	Curtis Joseph 21 saves / 22 shots

Toronto won series 4–0

==== (3) Washington Capitals vs. (6) Pittsburgh Penguins ====
The Washington Capitals entered the playoffs as the Southeast Division champions earning the third seed in the Eastern Conference with 96 points. The Pittsburgh Penguins earned the sixth seed with 96 points. This was the second consecutive postseason meeting and the seventh playoff match-up between these two rivals; with Pittsburgh winning five of the six previous series. They last met in the previous year's Eastern Conference Quarterfinals, which Pittsburgh won in five games. These teams split this year's four-game regular season series.

April 12	Pittsburgh Penguins	0–1	Washington Capitals	MCI Center	Recap
No scoring		First period	No scoring
No scoring		Second period	00:35 – pp – Peter Bondra (1)
No scoring		Third period	No scoring
Johan Hedberg 26 saves / 27 shots		Goalie stats	Olaf Kolzig 16 saves / 16 shots

April 14	Pittsburgh Penguins	2–1	Washington Capitals	MCI Center	Recap
Kevin Stevens (1) – pp – 07:13; Mario Lemieux (1) – 16:34		First period	09:25 – pp – Peter Bondra (2)
No scoring		Second period	No scoring
No scoring		Third period	No scoring
Johan Hedberg 17 saves / 18 shots		Goalie stats	Olaf Kolzig 25 saves / 27 shots

April 16	Washington Capitals	0–3	Pittsburgh Penguins	Mellon Arena	Recap
No scoring		First period	No scoring
No scoring		Second period	09:23 – Kevin Stevens (2)
No scoring		Third period	04:59 – Alexei Kovalev (1); 07:37 – Jan Hrdina (1)
Olaf Kolzig 21 saves / 24 shots		Goalie stats	Johan Hedberg 34 saves / 34 shots

April 18	Washington Capitals	4–3	OT	Pittsburgh Penguins	Mellon Arena	Recap
Steve Konowalchuk (1) – pp – 07:49		First period		No scoring
Brendan Witt (1) – pp – 19:16		Second period		01:15 – Mario Lemieux (2)
Steve Konowalchuk (2) – pp – 09:09		Third period		11:14 – pp – Jaromir Jagr (1); 13:50 – pp – Janne Laukkanen (1)
Jeff Halpern (1) – 04:01		First overtime period		No scoring
Olaf Kolzig 29 saves / 32 shots		Goalie stats		Johan Hedberg 25 saves / 29 shots

April 21	Pittsburgh Penguins	2–1	Washington Capitals	MCI Center	Recap
Andrew Ference (1) – 06:35; Mario Lemieux (3) – 07:06		First period	No scoring
No scoring		Second period	10:01 – pp – Sergei Gonchar (1)
No scoring		Third period	No scoring
Johan Hedberg 21 saves / 22 shots		Goalie stats	Olaf Kolzig 16 saves / 18 shots

April 23	Washington Capitals	3–4	OT	Pittsburgh Penguins	Mellon Arena	Recap
No scoring		First period		07:21 – pp – Mario Lemieux (4); 08:59 – Robert Lang (1)
Brendan Witt (2) – 14:07; Jeff Halpern (2) – pp – 17:28		Second period		19:59 – pp – Alexei Kovalev (2)
Calle Johansson (1) – 17:20		Third period		No scoring
No scoring		First overtime period		13:04 – Martin Straka (1)
Olaf Kolzig 32 saves / 36 shots		Goalie stats		Johan Hedberg 28 saves / 31 shots

Pittsburgh won series 4–2

==== (4) Philadelphia Flyers vs. (5) Buffalo Sabres ====
The Philadelphia Flyers entered the playoffs as the fourth seed in the Eastern Conference with 100 points. The Buffalo Sabres earned the fifth seed with 98 points. This was the second consecutive playoff meeting and seventh postseason match-up between these two teams; with Philadelphia winning five of the six previous series. They last met in the previous year's Eastern Conference Quarterfinals which Philadelphia won in five games. Philadelphia won all four games during this year's regular season series.

In the first period of game one, Dominik Hasek made a save on Mark Recchi's penalty shot opportunity.

April 11	Buffalo Sabres	2–1	Philadelphia Flyers	First Union Center	Recap
Chris Gratton (1) – 04:09; Doug Gilmour (1) – 18:04		First period	14:00 – Eric Desjardins (1)
No scoring		Second period	No scoring
No scoring		Third period	No scoring
Dominik Hasek 31 saves / 32 shots		Goalie stats	Roman Cechmanek 24 saves / 26 shots

April 14	Buffalo Sabres	4–3	OT	Philadelphia Flyers	First Union Center	Recap
No scoring		First period		13:13 – pp – Daymond Langkow (1)
Miroslav Satan (1) – pp – 00:47; Alexei Zhitnik (1) – 09:40		Second period		13:52 – John LeClair (1); 15:33 – Mark Recchi (1)
Curtis Brown (1) – 03:09		Third period		No scoring
Jay McKee (1) – 18:02		First overtime period		No scoring
Dominik Hasek 32 saves / 35 shots		Goalie stats		Roman Cechmanek 37 saves / 41 shots

April 16	Philadelphia Flyers	3–2	Buffalo Sabres	HSBC Arena	Recap
No scoring		First period	03:53 – pp – Chris Gratton (2)
Kent Manderville (1) – 02:37; Simon Gagne (1) – pp – 11:23		Second period	04:12 – pp – Steve Heinze (1)
Andy Delmore (1) – 11:06		Third period	No scoring
Roman Cechmanek 26 saves / 28 shots		Goalie stats	Dominik Hasek 16 saves / 19 shots

April 17	Philadelphia Flyers	3–4	OT	Buffalo Sabres	HSBC Arena	Recap
Daymond Langkow (2) – 14:16		First period		01:28 – Miroslav Satan (2); 02:18 – Donald Audette (1)
Simon Gagne (2) – 00:48		Second period		15:30 – Chris Gratton (3)
Dan McGillis (1) – sh – 10:16		Third period		No scoring
No scoring		First overtime period		06:13 – Curtis Brown (2)
. 31 saves / 35 shots		Goalie stats		Dominik Hasek 30 saves / 33 shots

April 19	Buffalo Sabres	1–3	Philadelphia Flyers	First Union Center	Recap
No scoring		First period	14:53 – pp – Simon Gagne (3)
Maxim Afinogenov (1) – 09:00		Second period	16:02 – pp – Mark Recchi (2)
No scoring		Third period	03:17 – Chris Therien (1)
Dominik Hasek 30 saves / 33 shots		Goalie stats	Roman Cechmanek 25 saves / 26 shots

April 21	Philadelphia Flyers	0–8	Buffalo Sabres	HSBC Arena	Recap
No scoring		First period	02:23 – Chris Gratton (4); 13:20 – pp – Doug Gilmour (2); 17:49 – Donald Audette (2); 18:46 – pp – Dave Andreychuk (1)
No scoring		Second period	03:25 – Jean-Pierre Dumont (1); 06:38 – pp – Steve Heinze (2)
No scoring		Third period	02:20 – Jean-Pierre Dumont (2); 16:51 – Chris Gratton (5)
Roman Cechmanek 4 saves / 9 shots Brian Boucher 14 saves / 17 shots		Goalie stats	Dominik Hasek 24 saves / 24 shots

Buffalo won series 4–2

=== Western Conference quarterfinals ===
==== (1) Colorado Avalanche vs. (8) Vancouver Canucks ====
The Colorado Avalanche entered the playoffs as the Presidents' Trophy winners as the NHL's best regular season team with 118 points. The Vancouver Canucks entered the playoffs as the eighth seed finishing the season with 90 points, winning the tiebreaker against Phoenix with 36 wins. This was the second playoff meeting between these two teams. Their only previous meeting was in the 1996 Western Conference Quarterfinals, which Colorado won in six games. Colorado won three of the five games during this year's regular season series. This was Vancouver's first playoff appearance since 1996.

April 12	Vancouver Canucks	4–5	Colorado Avalanche	Pepsi Center	Recap
Mattias Ohlund (1) – pp – 08:26		First period	15:11 – pp – Joe Sakic (1); 16:36 – pp – Rob Blake (1)
Trent Klatt (1) – 00:46; Todd Bertuzzi (1) – 16:33		Second period	05:35 – Chris Drury (1); 18:55 – pp – Joe Sakic (2)
Ed Jovanovski (1) – 10:17		Third period	18:53 – Chris Drury (2)
Dan Cloutier 23 saves / 28 shots		Goalie stats	Patrick Roy 19 saves / 23 shots

April 14	Vancouver Canucks	1–2	Colorado Avalanche	Pepsi Center	Recap
No scoring		First period	No scoring
Brendan Morrison (1) – pp – 00:35		Second period	No scoring
No scoring		Third period	02:22 – Ville Nieminen (1); 03:04 – Milan Hejduk (1)
Bob Essensa 23 saves / 25 shots		Goalie stats	Patrick Roy 18 saves / 19 shots

April 16	Colorado Avalanche	4–3	OT	Vancouver Canucks	General Motors Place	Recap
Joe Sakic (3) – 17:18		First period		06:13 – pp – Trent Klatt (2)
Chris Drury (3) – 08:37		Second period		01:37 – Daniel Sedin (1)
Adam Foote (1) – pp – 09:52		Third period		05:32 – Todd Bertuzzi (2)
Peter Forsberg (1) – 02:50		First overtime period		No scoring
Patrick Roy 20 saves / 23 shots		Goalie stats		Bob Essensa 29 saves / 33 shots

April 18	Colorado Avalanche	5–1	Vancouver Canucks	General Motors Place	Recap
No scoring		First period	No scoring
Chris Drury (4) – pp – 17:30		Second period	No scoring
Peter Forsberg (2) – 09:11; Joe Sakic (4) – 09:28; Eric Messier (1) – 09:49; Alex Tanguay (1) – en – 17:25		Third period	13:27 – pp – Trent Klatt (3)
Patrick Roy 22 saves / 23 shots		Goalie stats	Dan Cloutier 25 saves / 29 shots

Colorado won series 4–0

==== (2) Detroit Red Wings vs. (7) Los Angeles Kings ====
The Detroit Red Wings entered the playoffs as the Central Division champions earning the second seed in the Western Conference with 111 points. The Los Angeles Kings earned the seventh seed with 92 points. This was the second consecutive playoff meeting and second postseason match-up between these two teams. Their only previous meeting was in the previous year's Western Conference Quarterfinals, which Detroit won in a four-game sweep. These teams split this year's three-game regular season series.

April 11	Los Angeles Kings	3–5	Detroit Red Wings	Joe Louis Arena	Recap
No scoring		First period	06:23 – pp – Tomas Holmstrom (1); 08:51 – Sergei Fedorov (1); 13:24 – Brendan Shanahan (1)
Kelly Buchberger (1) – 02:21; Zigmund Palffy (1) – 07:47; Luc Robitaille (1) – 17:40		Second period	02:41 – Brendan Shanahan (2); 12:05 – pp – Igor Larionov (1)
No scoring		Third period	No scoring
Felix Potvin 26 saves / 31 shots		Goalie stats	Chris Osgood 27 saves / 30 shots

April 14	Los Angeles Kings	0–4	Detroit Red Wings	Joe Louis Arena	Recap
No scoring		First period	02:16 – pp – Sergei Fedorov (2); 09:12 – pp – Steve Duchesne (1)
No scoring		Second period	No scoring
No scoring		Third period	06:04 – Vyacheslav Kozlov (1); 13:31 – pp – Vyacheslav Kozlov (2)
Felix Potvin 28 saves / 32 shots		Goalie stats	Chris Osgood 20 saves / 20 shots

April 15	Detroit Red Wings	1–2	Los Angeles Kings	Staples Center	Recap
No scoring		First period	No scoring
Nicklas Lidstrom (1) – 18:02		Second period	08:21 – Luc Robitaille (2)
No scoring		Third period	13:33 – Jozef Stumpel (1)
Chris Osgood 22 saves / 24 shots		Goalie stats	Felix Potvin 22 saves / 23 shots

April 18	Detroit Red Wings	3–4	OT	Los Angeles Kings	Staples Center	Recap
Pat Verbeek (1) – pp – 13:57		First period		No scoring
Steve Duchesne (2) – pp – 01:19; Vyacheslav Kozlov (3) – pp – 02:51		Second period		No scoring
No scoring		Third period		13:53 – pp – Scott Thomas (1); 17:33 – pp – Jozef Stumpel (2); 19:07 – Bryan Smolinski (1)
No scoring		First overtime period		02:36 – Eric Belanger (1)
Chris Osgood 27 saves / 31 shots		Goalie stats		Felix Potvin 20 saves / 23 shots

April 21	Los Angeles Kings	3–2	Detroit Red Wings	Joe Louis Arena	Recap
Zigmund Palffy (2) – 01:15		First period	No scoring
Ian Laperriere (1) – 01:15		Second period	No scoring
Adam Deadmarsh (1) – 01:38		Third period	00:33 – Vyacheslav Kozlov (4); 12:46 – Chris Chelios (1)
Felix Potvin 27 saves / 29 shots		Goalie stats	Chris Osgood 22 saves / 25 shots

April 23	Detroit Red Wings	2–3	OT	Los Angeles Kings	Staples Center	Recap
No scoring		First period		02:19 – pp – Jozef Stumpel (3)
Pat Verbeek (2) – pp – 04:20; Darren McCarty (1) – 06:42		Second period		No scoring
No scoring		Third period		10:17 – Adam Deadmarsh (2)
No scoring		First overtime period		04:48 – Adam Deadmarsh (3)
Chris Osgood 25 saves / 28 shots		Goalie stats		Felix Potvin 26 saves / 28 shots

Los Angeles won series 4–2

==== (3) Dallas Stars vs. (6) Edmonton Oilers ====
The Dallas Stars entered the playoffs as the Pacific Division champions earning the third seed in the Western Conference with 106 points. The Edmonton Oilers earned the sixth seed with 93 points. This was the fifth consecutive playoff meeting and seventh overall postseason match-up between these two teams; with Dallas winning four of the six previous series. Dallas won last year's Western Conference Quarterfinals in five games. Dallas won three of the four games in this year's regular season series.

April 11	Edmonton Oilers	1–2	OT	Dallas Stars	Reunion Arena	Recap
No scoring		First period		No scoring
Ryan Smyth (1) – 06:51		Second period		18:14 – pp – Mike Modano (1)
No scoring		Third period		No scoring
No scoring		First overtime period		02:08 – Jamie Langenbrunner (1)
Tommy Salo 26 saves / 28 shots		Goalie stats		Ed Belfour 21 saves / 22 shots

April 14	Edmonton Oilers	4–3	Dallas Stars	Reunion Arena	Recap
Daniel Cleary (1) – pp – 09:37; Georges Laraque (1) – 11:34; Rem Murray (1) – pp – 18:14		First period	00:26 – Mike Keane (1); 11:12 – pp – Joe Nieuwendyk (1)
Anson Carter (1) – pp – 13:32		Second period	No scoring
No scoring		Third period	01:18 – pp – Darryl Sydor (1)
Tommy Salo 22 saves / 25 shots		Goalie stats	Ed Belfour 27 saves / 31 shots

April 15	Dallas Stars	3–2	OT	Edmonton Oilers	Skyreach Centre	Recap
Sergei Zubov (1) – 03:06		First period		No scoring
No scoring		Second period		No scoring
Mike Modano (2) – pp – 05:51		Third period		18:57 – Ryan Smyth (2); 19:53 – Rem Murray (2)
Benoit Hogue (1) – 19:48		First overtime period		No scoring
Ed Belfour 26 saves / 28 shots		Goalie stats		Tommy Salo 37 saves / 40 shots

April 17	Dallas Stars	1–2	OT	Edmonton Oilers	Skyreach Centre	Recap
No scoring		First period		No scoring
No scoring		Second period		14:24 – Anson Carter (1)
Mike Keane (2) – 13:15		Third period		No scoring
No scoring		First overtime period		17:19 – pp – Mike Comrie (1)
Ed Belfour 30 saves / 32 shots		Goalie stats		Tommy Salo 34 saves / 35 shots

April 19	Edmonton Oilers	3–4	OT	Dallas Stars	Reunion Arena	Recap
No scoring		First period		06:02 – Jere Lehtinen (1)
No scoring		Second period		01:12 – Jamie Langenbrunner (2)
Anson Carter (3) – 02:32; Doug Weight (1) – 03:04; Eric Brewer (1) – pp – 05:29		Third period		15:38 – John MacLean (1)
No scoring		First overtime period		08:01 – Kirk Muller (1)
Tommy Salo 30 saves / 34 shots		Goalie stats		Ed Belfour 15 saves / 18 shots

April 21	Dallas Stars	3–1	Edmonton Oilers	Skyreach Centre	Recap
No scoring		First period	04:44 – Ryan Smyth (3)
No scoring		Second period	No scoring
Brett Hull (1) – 08:57; Joe Nieuwendyk (2) – 17:07; Mike Modano (3) – en – 19:16		Third period	No scoring
Ed Belfour 20 saves / 21 shots		Goalie stats	Tommy Salo 23 saves / 25 shots

Dallas won series 4–2

==== (4) St. Louis Blues vs. (5) San Jose Sharks ====
The St. Louis Blues entered the playoffs as the fourth seed in the Western Conference with 103 points. The San Jose Sharks earned the fifth seed with 95 points. This was the second consecutive playoff meeting and second postseason match-up between these two teams. San Jose won last year's Western Conference Quarterfinals in seven games. St. Louis won the four-game regular season series earning five of eight points.

April 12	San Jose Sharks	1–3	St. Louis Blues	Savvis Center	Recap
No scoring		First period	No scoring
No scoring		Second period	17:10 – Pierre Turgeon (1)
Patrick Marleau (1) – 11:15		Third period	00:38 – Scott Young (1); 07:00 – pp – Al MacInnis (1)
Evgeni Nabokov 21 saves / 24 shots		Goalie stats	Roman Turek 21 saves / 22 shots

April 14	San Jose Sharks	1–0	St. Louis Blues	Savvis Center	Recap
No scoring		First period	No scoring
Scott Thornton (1) – 13:52		Second period	No scoring
No scoring		Third period	No scoring
Evgeni Nabokov 28 saves / 28 shots		Goalie stats	Roman Turek 18 saves / 19 shots

April 16	St. Louis Blues	6–3	San Jose Sharks	Compaq Center	Recap
Scott Mellanby (1) – pp – 02:31; Jochen Hecht (1) – 04:16; Cory Stillman (1) – 13:49		First period	16:19 – Scott Thornton (2)
Dallas Drake (1) – sh – 06:17; Pierre Turgeon (2) – pp – 17:12		Second period	12:30 – sh – Vincent Damphousse (1)
Dallas Drake (2) – en – 19:21		Third period	03:13 – Tony Granato (1)
Roman Turek 35 saves / 38 shots		Goalie stats	Evgeni Nabokov 16 saves / 21 shots

April 17	St. Louis Blues	2–3	San Jose Sharks	Compaq Center	Recap
Keith Tkachuk (1) – pp – 19:59		First period	No scoring
No scoring		Second period	00:58 – Vincent Damphousse (2); 06:49 – Scott Thornton (3); 12:32 – Owen Nolan (1)
Dallas Drake (3) – 19:35		Third period	No scoring
Roman Turek 22 saves / 25 shots		Goalie stats	Miikka Kiprusoff 39 saves / 41 shots

April 19	San Jose Sharks	2–3	OT	St. Louis Blues	Savvis Center	Recap
Stephane Matteau (1) – 08:54		First period		07:07 – Scott Young (2)
Patrick Marleau (2) – 11:56		Second period		No scoring
No scoring		Third period		17:12 – Dallas Drake (4)
No scoring		First overtime period		09:54 – Bryce Salvador (1)
Miikka Kiprusoff 35 saves / 38 shots		Goalie stats		Roman Turek 24 saves / 26 shots

April 21	St. Louis Blues	2–1	San Jose Sharks	Compaq Center	Recap
No scoring		First period	No scoring
Cory Stillman (2) – pp – 15:20; Pavol Demitra (1) – 16:12		Second period	No scoring
No scoring		Third period	12:31 – Brad Stuart (1)
Roman Turek 30 saves / 31 shots		Goalie stats	Evgeni Nabokov 28 saves / 30 shots

St. Louis won series 4–2

== Conference semifinals ==
=== Eastern Conference semifinals ===
==== (1) New Jersey Devils vs. (7) Toronto Maple Leafs ====
This was the second consecutive playoff meeting and second postseason match-up between these two teams. New Jersey won last year's Eastern Conference Semifinals in six games. These teams split this year's three-game regular season series.

In game one, Nik Antropov scored the game-winning goal in the second period, while Curtis Joseph saved all 32 shots by the Devils. In game two, the Leafs led by one goal going into the second period. The Devils scored four consecutive goals against Joseph, one each by Gomez, Rafalski, Mogilny and Madden. The Maple Leafs' Sundin scored a short-handed goal 29 seconds into the third period, and the Devils' Mogilny scored a power-play goal 38 seconds after that. The Leafs' Thomas and Sundin combined to score three goals, and the game required overtime, during which the Devils' Randy McKay scored the game-winning goal. In game three, Rafalski scored the game-winning goal off a deflection in overtime. The Devils recorded 17 more shots than Toronto. In game four, Toronto's Corson scored in the first period, and Berezin and Mats Sundin scored in the second. The Devils' Elias scored a power-play goal in the second period. Maple Leafs' forward Tie Domi checked Devils defenceman Scott Niedermayer, who left the ice rink on a stretcher. In game five, Leafs' defenceman Cory Cross initiated scoring early in the second period, and Devils' right winger Petr Sykora and center Jason Arnott scored one goal each. In the third period, Toronto's Tomas Kaberle scored the game-winner with 30 seconds left to give the Leafs a 3-2 series lead. In game six, Brian Rafalski scored the game-winning goal for the Devils. In game seven, the Devils' Patrik Elias scored two goals in the second period.

April 26	Toronto Maple Leafs	2–0	New Jersey Devils	Continental Airlines Arena	Recap
No scoring		First period	No scoring
Nik Antropov (2) – 03:16; Steve Thomas (1) – pp – 09:02		Second period	No scoring
No scoring		Third period	No scoring
Curtis Joseph 32 saves / 32 shots		Goalie stats	Martin Brodeur 15 saves / 17 shots

April 28	Toronto Maple Leafs	5–6	OT	New Jersey Devils	Continental Airlines Arena	Recap
Danny Markov (1) – 08:30		First period		No scoring
No scoring		Second period		02:58 – Scott Gomez (3); 05:25 – Brian Rafalski (2); 09:27 – Alexander Mogilny (3); 15:04 – John Madden (1)
Mats Sundin (3) – sh – 00:29; Steve Thomas (2) – 05:59; Mats Sundin (4) – 09:33; Steve Thomas (3) – 19:37		Third period		01:07 – pp – Alexander Mogilny (4)
No scoring		First overtime period		05:31 – Randy McKay (4)
Curtis Joseph 27 saves / 33 shots		Goalie stats		Martin Brodeur 16 saves / 21 shots

May 1	New Jersey Devils	3–2	OT	Toronto Maple Leafs	Air Canada Centre	Recap
Bobby Holik (5) – pp – 09:21		First period		No scoring
No scoring		Second period		08:52 – Garry Valk (1); 11:26 – pp – Steve Thomas (4)
Scott Gomez (4) – 01:34		Third period		No scoring
Brian Rafalski (3) – 07:00		First overtime period		No scoring
Martin Brodeur 26 saves / 28 shots		Goalie stats		Curtis Joseph 42 saves / 45 shots

May 3	New Jersey Devils	1–3	Toronto Maple Leafs	Air Canada Centre	Recap
No scoring		First period	14:38 – Shayne Corson (1)
Patrik Elias (3) – 09:21		Second period	01:21 – Sergei Berezin (2); 10:43 – Mats Sundin (5)
No scoring		Third period	No scoring
Martin Brodeur 17 saves / 20 shots		Goalie stats	Curtis Joseph 23 saves / 24 shots

May 5	Toronto Maple Leafs	3–2	New Jersey Devils	Continental Airlines Arena	Recap
Bryan McCabe (2) – pp – 09:30		First period	No scoring
Cory Cross (2) – 04:33		Second period	12:43 – Petr Sykora (3); 16:50 – pp – Jason Arnott (2)
Tomas Kaberle (1) – 19:30		Third period	No scoring
Curtis Joseph 24 saves / 26 shots		Goalie stats	Martin Brodeur 17 saves / 20 shots

May 7	New Jersey Devils	4–2	Toronto Maple Leafs	Air Canada Centre	Recap
Petr Sykora (4) – 04:54		First period	No scoring
Randy McKay (5) – pp – 15:18; Brian Rafalski (4) – 19:52		Second period	05:07 – pp – Steve Thomas (5)
Jason Arnott (3) – 05:58		Third period	02:17 – pp – Mats Sundin (6)
Martin Brodeur 24 saves / 26 shots		Goalie stats	Curtis Joseph 22 saves / 26 shots

May 9	Toronto Maple Leafs	1–5	New Jersey Devils	Continental Airlines Arena	Recap
Steve Thomas (6) – pp – 09:06		First period	No scoring
No scoring		Second period	01:32 – Sergei Nemchinov (1); 07:13 – pp – Patrik Elias (4); 09:12 – Patrik Elias (5); 14:41 – Scott Stevens (1)
No scoring		Third period	10:50 – John Madden (2)
Curtis Joseph 15 saves / 20 shots		Goalie stats	Martin Brodeur 15 saves / 16 shots

New Jersey won series 4–3

==== (5) Buffalo Sabres vs. (6) Pittsburgh Penguins ====
This was the second playoff meeting between these two teams; with Pittsburgh winning the only previous meeting in the 1979 Preliminary Round in three games. Pittsburgh won three of the four games in this year's regular season series.

In game one, Penguins centre Mario Lemieux scored the game-winning goal in the first period. Centres Wayne Primeau and Jan Hrdina also scored. Penguins winger Jaromir Jagr, who assisted on the Lemieux goal in the first period, injured his leg in the third period and did not play in game two. In game two, the Penguins' Robert Lang, Ference and Kovalev scored goals. Sabres centre Stu Barnes scored. In game three, Sabres defenceman Jason Woolley scored the game-winning goal. His teammates Curtis Brown, Miroslav Satan and James Patrick also scored. In game four, Stu Barnes scored two goals, including the game-winning goal. Buffalo's Jean-Pierre Dumont and Curtis Brown also scored. The Penguins' Martin Straka and Janne Laukkanen scored. In game five, Stu Barnes scored the game-winning goal in overtime. His teammates Chris Gratton and Curtis Brown also scored goals. The Penguins' Jaromir Jagr and Aleksey Morozov scored. Martin Straka had an unsuccessful penalty shot. In game six, Martin Straka scored the game-winning goal in overtime. His teammates Mario Lemieux and Alexei Kovalev also scored. Buffalo's Maxim Afinogenov and Donald Audette scored for the Sabres. In game seven, Penguins defenceman Darius Kasparaitis scored the game-winning goal in overtime. Pittsburgh's Andrew Ference and Robert Lang also scored. Buffalo's Jean-Pierre Dumont and Steve Heinze scored for the Sabres.

April 26	Pittsburgh Penguins	3–0	Buffalo Sabres	HSBC Arena	Recap
Mario Lemieux (5) – 05:07		First period	No scoring
Jan Hrdina (2) – 14:02		Second period	No scoring
Wayne Primeau (1) – 17:40		Third period	No scoring
Johan Hedberg 25 saves / 25 shots		Goalie stats	Dominik Hasek 29 saves / 32 shots

April 28	Pittsburgh Penguins	3–1	Buffalo Sabres	HSBC Arena	Recap
No scoring		First period	No scoring
Robert Lang (2) – 10:11		Second period	14:44 – pp – Stu Barnes (1)
Andrew Ference (2) – 08:09; Alexei Kovalev (3) – en – 19:57		Third period	No scoring
Johan Hedberg 21 saves / 22 shots		Goalie stats	Dominik Hasek 12 saves / 14 shots

April 30	Buffalo Sabres	4–1	Pittsburgh Penguins	Mellon Arena	Recap
No scoring		First period	No scoring
Curtis Brown (3) – 13:04		Second period	05:34 – pp – Kevin Stevens (3)
Jason Woolley (1) – 09:51; Miroslav Satan (3) – 13:03; James Patrick (1) – en – 19:39		Third period	No scoring
Dominik Hasek 19 saves / 20 shots		Goalie stats	Johan Hedberg 26 saves / 29 shots

May 2	Buffalo Sabres	5–2	Pittsburgh Penguins	Mellon Arena	Recap
Jean-Pierre Dumont (3) – 01:28; Curtis Brown (4) – sh – 19:13		First period	11:10 – pp – Martin Straka (2)
No scoring		Second period	05:24 – Janne Laukkanen (2)
Stu Barnes (2) – 04:44; Vladimir Tsyplakov (1) – 14:24; Stu Barnes (3) – pp – 18:09		Third period	No scoring
Dominik Hasek 15 saves / 17 shots		Goalie stats	Johan Hedberg 23 saves / 28 shots

May 5	Pittsburgh Penguins	2–3	OT	Buffalo Sabres	HSBC Arena	Recap
Jaromir Jagr (2) – pp – 14:51		First period		No scoring
Aleksey Morozov (1) – 02:36		Second period		09:54 – pp – Chris Gratton (6)
No scoring		Third period		11:16 – sh – Curtis Brown (5)
No scoring		First overtime period		08:34 – Stu Barnes (4)
Johan Hedberg 27 saves / 30 shots		Goalie stats		Dominik Hasek 25 saves / 27 shots

May 8	Buffalo Sabres	2–3	OT	Pittsburgh Penguins	Mellon Arena	Recap
Maxim Afinogenov (2) – 09:26		First period		No scoring
Donald Audette (3) – 15:12		Second period		05:14 – Alexei Kovalev (4)
No scoring		Third period		18:42 – Mario Lemieux (6)
No scoring		First overtime period		11:29 – Martin Straka (3)
Dominik Hasek 30 saves / 33 shots		Goalie stats		Johan Hedberg 16 saves / 18 shots Jean-Sebastien Aubin 0 saves / 0 shots

May 10	Pittsburgh Penguins	3–2	OT	Buffalo Sabres	HSBC Arena	Recap
No scoring		First period		No scoring
Andrew Ference (3) – pp – 08:19		Second period		01:50 – Jean-Pierre Dumont (4)
Robert Lang (3) – 09:00		Third period		00:32 – pp – Steve Heinze (3)
Darius Kasparaitis (1) – 13:01		First overtime period		No scoring
Johan Hedberg 28 saves / 30 shots		Goalie stats		Dominik Hasek 25 saves / 28 shots

Pittsburgh won series 4–3

=== Western Conference semifinals ===
==== (1) Colorado Avalanche vs. (7) Los Angeles Kings ====
This was the first playoff meeting between these two teams. These teams split this year's four-game regular season series.

In game one, the Avalanche took two minor penalties, one of which led to the game-winning power play goal by Kings defenceman Jaroslav Modry. In game three, Avalanche centre Joe Sakic injured his shoulder and would sit out part of the series. Game six featured 65 shots and one goal, scored by Kings winger Glen Murray in the second overtime.

April 26	Los Angeles Kings	4–3	OT	Colorado Avalanche	Pepsi Center	Recap
Glen Murray (1) – 09:20		First period		15:59 – Chris Drury (5)
Nelson Emerson (1) – 09:29		Second period		02:40 – Rob Blake (2)
Glen Murray (2) – 13:00		Third period		15:30 – pp – Peter Forsberg (3)
Jaroslav Modry – pp – 14:23		First overtime period		No scoring
Felix Potvin 34 saves / 37 shots		Goalie stats		Patrick Roy 21 saves / 25 shots

April 28	Los Angeles Kings	0–2	Colorado Avalanche	Pepsi Center	Recap
No scoring		First period	No scoring
No scoring		Second period	02:29 – pp – Ville Nieminen (2)
No scoring		Third period	15:13 – Joe Sakic (5)
Felix Potvin 26 saves / 28 shots		Goalie stats	Patrick Roy 20 saves / 20 shots

April 30	Colorado Avalanche	4–3	Los Angeles Kings	Staples Center	Recap
Rob Blake (3) – 04:33		First period	16:17 – pp – Luc Robitaille (3)
Peter Forsberg (4) – 10:43		Second period	No scoring
Milan Hejduk (2) – 08:21; Jon Klemm (1) – 10:33		Third period	10:00 – pp – Glen Murray (3); 19:20 – Zigmund Palffy (3)
Patrick Roy 22 saves / 25 shots		Goalie stats	Felix Potvin 17 saves / 21 shots

May 2	Colorado Avalanche	3–0	Los Angeles Kings	Staples Center	Recap
No scoring		First period	No scoring
Alex Tanguay (2) – 03:55; Milan Hejduk (3) – pp – 16:27; Chris Drury (6) – 18:13		Second period	No scoring
No scoring		Third period	No scoring
Patrick Roy 21 saves / 21 shots		Goalie stats	Felix Potvin 18 saves / 21 shots

May 4	Los Angeles Kings	1–0	Colorado Avalanche	Pepsi Center	Recap
No scoring		First period	No scoring
No scoring		Second period	No scoring
Luc Robitaille (4) – 10:05		Third period	No scoring
Felix Potvin 20 saves / 20 shots		Goalie stats	Patrick Roy 25 saves / 26 shots

May 6	Colorado Avalanche	0–1	2OT	Los Angeles Kings	Staples Center	Recap
No scoring		First period		No scoring
No scoring		Second period		No scoring
No scoring		Third period		No scoring
No scoring		Second overtime period		02:41 – Glen Murray (4)
Patrick Roy 31 saves / 32 shots		Goalie stats		Felix Potvin 33 saves / 33 shots

May 9	Los Angeles Kings	1–5	Colorado Avalanche	Pepsi Center	Recap
No scoring		First period	18:29 – pp – Rob Blake (4)
Nelson Emerson (2) – 18:31		Second period	No scoring
No scoring		Third period	03:03 – Chris Drury (7); 06:22 – pp – Ville Nieminen (3); 11:07 – Shjon Podein (1); 16:25 – en – Milan Hejduk (4)
Felix Potvin 31 saves / 35 shots		Goalie stats	Patrick Roy 25 saves / 26 shots

Colorado won series 4–3

==== (3) Dallas Stars vs. (4) St. Louis Blues ====
This was the twelfth playoff meeting between these two teams; with Dallas winning six of the eleven previous series. They last met in the 1999 Western Conference Semifinals, which Dallas won in six games. St. Louis won this year's three-game regular season series earning four of six points.

Dallas was swept for the first time since relocating from Minnesota; the franchise had not been swept since 1984 when the Minnesota North Stars were swept by the Edmonton Oilers. Game two was the last game played in the Reunion Arena.

April 27	St. Louis Blues	4–2	Dallas Stars	Reunion Arena	Recap
Pavol Demitra (2) – 09:02; Marty Reasoner (1) – 15:08		First period	09:55 – John MacLean (2)
Marty Reasoner (2) – 03:30; Pierre Turgeon (3) – 08:46		Second period	No scoring
No scoring		Third period	12:22 – Brad Lukowich (1)
Roman Turek 21 saves / 23 shots		Goalie stats	Ed Belfour 17 saves / 21 shots

April 29	St. Louis Blues	2–1	Dallas Stars	Reunion Arena	Recap
Marty Reasoner (3) – 01:25; Scott Young (3) – sh – 09:32		First period	No scoring
No scoring		Second period	No scoring
No scoring		Third period	19:08 – Joe Nieuwendyk (3)
Roman Turek 28 saves / 29 shots		Goalie stats	Ed Belfour 22 saves / 24 shots

May 1	Dallas Stars	2–3	2OT	St. Louis Blues	Savvis Center	Recap
Mike Keane (3) – 05:29		First period		No scoring
Brett Hull (2) – pp – 07:53		Second period		17:59 – Jochen Hecht (2)
No scoring		Third period		17:45 – Alexander Khavanov (1)
No scoring		Second overtime period		09:26 – Cory Stillman (3)
Ed Belfour 45 saves / 48 shots		Goalie stats		Roman Turek 25 saves / 27 shots

May 3	Dallas Stars	1–4	St. Louis Blues	Savvis Center	Recap
No scoring		First period	No scoring
Joe Nieuwendyk (4) – 16:40		Second period	09:28 – Alexander Khavanov (2); 14:37 – pp – Keith Tkachuk (2)
No scoring		Third period	16:11 – Chris Pronger (1); 18:36 – en – Scott Young (4)
Ed Belfour 29 saves / 32 shots		Goalie stats	Roman Turek 32 saves / 33 shots

St. Louis won series 4–0

== Conference finals ==
=== Eastern Conference final ===
==== (1) New Jersey Devils vs. (6) Pittsburgh Penguins ====
This was the fifth playoff meeting between these two teams; with Pittsburgh winning three of the four previous series. They last met in the 1999 Eastern Conference Quarterfinals where Pittsburgh won in seven games. This was New Jersey's second consecutive and fifth overall appearance in the Conference Finals; they defeated the Philadelphia Flyers in seven games in the previous year's Eastern Conference Final. This was Pittsburgh's fourth appearance in the Conference Finals; they last made it to the Conference Finals in 1996, where they lost to the Florida Panthers in seven games. Pittsburgh won this year's five-game regular season series by earning seven of ten points.

Game three was Martin Brodeur's eleventh career postseason shutout, and it was also the first home shutout loss for the Penguins since 1975. In game four, Martin Brodeur recorded his twelfth career playoff shutout.

May 12	Pittsburgh Penguins	1–3	New Jersey Devils	Continental Airlines Arena	Recap
Martin Straka (4) – pp – 03:06		First period	14:09 – pp – Randy McKay (6)
No scoring		Second period	17:04 – pp – Petr Sykora (5)
No scoring		Third period	01:20 – Petr Sykora (6)
Johan Hedberg 18 saves / 21 shots		Goalie stats	Martin Brodeur 14 saves / 15 shots

May 15	Pittsburgh Penguins	4–2	New Jersey Devils	Continental Airlines Arena	Recap
No scoring		First period	08:52 – Jay Pandolfo (1); 16:34 – sh – Petr Sykora (7)
Aleksey Morozov (2) – sh – 09:20; Alexei Kovalev (5) – 12:17; Rene Corbet (1) – 15:55		Second period	No scoring
Robert Lang (4) – 05:19		Third period	No scoring
Johan Hedberg 27 saves / 29 shots		Goalie stats	Martin Brodeur 19 saves / 23 shots

May 17	New Jersey Devils	3–0	Pittsburgh Penguins	Mellon Arena	Recap
Brian Rafalski (5) – 08:42; Jason Arnott (4) – pp – 12:37		First period	No scoring
No scoring		Second period	No scoring
Patrik Elias (6) – 01:27		Third period	No scoring
Martin Brodeur 20 saves / 20 shots		Goalie stats	Johan Hedberg 33 saves / 36 shots

May 19	New Jersey Devils	5–0	Pittsburgh Penguins	Mellon Arena	Recap
Patrik Elias (7) – 18:11		First period	No scoring
Brian Rafalski (6) – 07:58; Petr Sykora (8) – 15:34		Second period	No scoring
Jason Arnott (5) – 04:17; Brian Rafalski (7) – pp – 13:14		Third period	No scoring
Martin Brodeur 21 saves / 21 shots		Goalie stats	Johan Hedberg 25 saves / 30 shots

May 22	Pittsburgh Penguins	2–4	New Jersey Devils	Continental Airlines Arena	Recap
Aleksey Morozov (3) – 16:38		First period	00:57 – Jason Arnott (6)
Martin Straka (5) – pp – 13:09		Second period	07:31 – pp – Jason Arnott (7); 12:23 – Bobby Holik (6)
No scoring		Third period	03:32 – John Madden (3)
Johan Hedberg 19 saves / 23 shots		Goalie stats	Martin Brodeur 18 saves / 20 shots

New Jersey won series 4–1

=== Western Conference final ===
==== (1) Colorado Avalanche vs. (4) St. Louis Blues ====
This was the first playoff meeting between these two teams. This was Colorado's third consecutive and seventh overall appearance in the Conference Finals; they lost to the Dallas Stars in seven games during the previous year's Western Conference Final. St. Louis made their second Conference Finals appearance; they last made it to the Conference Finals in 1986 where they lost to the Calgary Flames in seven games. Colorado won this year's four-game regular season series by earning six of eight points.

In game one, Joe Sakic's penalty shot goal was awarded when Blues goaltender Roman Turek was ruled to have thrown his stick.

May 12	St. Louis Blues	1–4	Colorado Avalanche	Pepsi Center	Recap
No scoring		First period	04:32 – pp – Milan Hejduk (5)
Scott Young (5) – sh – 00:25		Second period	06:45 – ps – Joe Sakic (6)
No scoring		Third period	05:18 – Joe Sakic (7); 14:00 – pp – Milan Hejduk (6)
Roman Turek 26 saves / 30 shots		Goalie stats	Patrick Roy 30 saves / 31 shots

May 14	St. Louis Blues	2–4	Colorado Avalanche	Pepsi Center	Recap
No scoring		First period	13:22 – pp – Ray Bourque (1)
Scott Mellanby (2) – pp – 08:27		Second period	18:04 – Adam Foote (2)
Al MacInnis (2) – pp – 15:52		Third period	13:21 – Shjon Podein (2); 19:52 – en – Chris Drury (8)
Roman Turek 16 saves / 19 shots		Goalie stats	Patrick Roy 28 saves / 30 shots

May 16	Colorado Avalanche	3–4	2OT	St. Louis Blues	Savvis Center	Recap
Ray Bourque (2) – pp – 06:46; Dan Hinote (1) – 08:36		First period		05:54 – pp – Alexander Khavanov (3)
No scoring		Second period		No scoring
Eric Messier (2) – 12:40		Third period		10:13 – Scott Mellanby (3); 14:17 – Jamal Mayers (1)
No scoring		Second overtime period		10:27 – Scott Young (6)
Patrick Roy 56 saves / 60 shots		Goalie stats		Roman Turek 30 saves / 33 shots

May 18	Colorado Avalanche	4–3	OT	St. Louis Blues	Savvis Center	Recap
Steve Reinprecht (1) – 14:13; Joe Sakic (8) – 15:17; Ray Bourque (3) – 15:31		First period		No scoring
No scoring		Second period		04:40 – Pierre Turgeon (4); 09:24 – Pierre Turgeon (5)
No scoring		Third period		00:58 – Jamal Mayers (2)
Stephane Yelle (1) – 04:23		First overtime period		No scoring
Patrick Roy 28 saves / 31 shots		Goalie stats		Roman Turek 23 saves / 27 shots

May 21	St. Louis Blues	1–2	OT	Colorado Avalanche	Pepsi Center	Recap
No scoring		First period		No scoring
Bryce Salvador (2) – 13:31		Second period		11:20 – pp – Milan Hejduk (7)
No scoring		Third period		No scoring
No scoring		First overtime period		00:24 – pp – Joe Sakic (9)
Brent Johnson 34 saves / 36 shots		Goalie stats		Patrick Roy 28 saves / 29 shots

Colorado won series 4–1

== Stanley Cup Final ==
This was the first playoff meeting between these two teams. Colorado made its second Finals appearance and first since defeating the Florida Panthers in a four-game sweep in 1996. New Jersey made its second consecutive and third overall Finals appearance after defeating the Dallas Stars the year before. It was the first Finals match-up to feature both regular season conference champions since 1989. New Jersey won both games in this year's regular season series. The Colorado Avalanche did not win the Stanley Cup again until 2022.

May 26	New Jersey Devils	0–5	Colorado Avalanche	Pepsi Center	Recap
No scoring		First period	11:07 – Joe Sakic (10)
No scoring		Second period	09:35 – Chris Drury (9); 15:06 – Joe Sakic (11)
No scoring		Third period	05:36 – pp – Rob Blake (5); 17:36 – Steve Reinprecht (2)
Martin Brodeur 25 saves / 30 shots		Goalie stats	Patrick Roy 25 saves / 25 shots

May 29	New Jersey Devils	2–1	Colorado Avalanche	Pepsi Center	Recap
Bob Corkum (1) – 14:29; Turner Stevenson (1) – 17:20		First period	05:58 – pp – Joe Sakic (12)
No scoring		Second period	No scoring
No scoring		Third period	No scoring
Martin Brodeur 19 saves / 20 shots		Goalie stats	Patrick Roy 18 saves / 20 shots

May 31	Colorado Avalanche	3–1	New Jersey Devils	Continental Airlines Arena	Recap
Martin Skoula (1) – 10:38		First period	03:16 – pp – Jason Arnott (8)
No scoring		Second period	No scoring
Ray Bourque (4) – pp – 00:31; Dan Hinote (2) – 06:28		Third period	No scoring
Patrick Roy 21 saves / 22 shots		Goalie stats	Martin Brodeur 18 saves / 21 shots

June 2	Colorado Avalanche	2–3	New Jersey Devils	Continental Airlines Arena	Recap
Rob Blake (6) – 03:58		First period	No scoring
Chris Drury (10) – 13:54		Second period	03:42 – sh – Patrik Elias (8)
No scoring		Third period	08:09 – Scott Gomez (5); 17:23 – Petr Sykora (9)
Patrick Roy 32 saves / 35 shots		Goalie stats	Martin Brodeur 10 saves / 12 shots

June 4	New Jersey Devils	4–1	Colorado Avalanche	Pepsi Center	Recap
Patrik Elias (9) – 03:09; Alexander Mogilny (5) – 18:47		First period	10:09 – pp – Alex Tanguay (3)
Sergei Brylin (3) – pp – 04:39		Second period	No scoring
John Madden (4) – 18:05		Third period	No scoring
Martin Brodeur 22 saves / 23 shots		Goalie stats	Patrick Roy 22 saves / 26 shots

June 7	Colorado Avalanche	4–0	New Jersey Devils	Continental Airlines Arena	Recap
Adam Foote (3) – 18:02		First period	No scoring
Ville Nieminen (4) – pp – 02:26; Chris Drury (11) – 18:27		Second period	No scoring
Alex Tanguay (4) – 13:46		Third period	No scoring
Patrick Roy 24 saves / 24 shots		Goalie stats	Martin Brodeur 14 saves / 18 shots

June 9	New Jersey Devils	1–3	Colorado Avalanche	Pepsi Center	Recap
No scoring		First period	07:58 – Alex Tanguay (5)
Petr Sykora (10) – pp – 09:33		Second period	04:57 – Alex Tanguay (6); 06:16 – pp – Joe Sakic (13)
No scoring		Third period	No scoring
Martin Brodeur 19 saves / 22 shots		Goalie stats	Patrick Roy 25 saves / 26 shots

Colorado won series 4–3

== Playoff statistics ==
=== Skaters ===
Colorado Avalanche captain Joe Sakic led the playoffs in scoring for the second time in his career. Patrik Elias of the New Jersey Devils finished second in playoff scoring with 23 points. The table lists the top 10 point producers.

Player	Team	GP	G	A	Pts	+/–	PIM
Joe Sakic	Colorado Avalanche	21	13	13	26	+6	6
Patrik Elias	New Jersey Devils	25	9	14	23	+11	10
Milan Hejduk	Colorado Avalanche	23	7	16	23	+8	6
Petr Sykora	New Jersey Devils	25	10	12	22	+15	12
Alex Tanguay	Colorado Avalanche	23	6	15	21	+13	8
Rob Blake	Colorado Avalanche	23	6	13	19	+6	16
Brian Rafalski	New Jersey Devils	25	7	11	18	+10	7
Mario Lemieux	Pittsburgh Penguins	18	6	11	17	+4	4
Chris Drury	Colorado Avalanche	23	11	5	16	+5	4
Bobby Holik	New Jersey Devils	25	6	10	16	+1	37
Alexander Mogilny	New Jersey Devils	25	5	11	16	+3	8

=== Goaltenders ===
The following table lists goaltenders with at least 420 minutes.

Player	Team	GP	W	L	SA	GA	GAA	SV%	SO	TOI
Patrick Roy	Colorado Avalanche	23	16	7	622	41	1.70	.934	4	1450:56
Roman Turek	St. Louis Blues	14	9	5	382	31	2.05	.919	0	908:26
Martin Brodeur	New Jersey Devils	25	15	10	507	52	2.07	.897	4	1504:43
Dominik Hasek	Buffalo Sabres	13	7	6	347	29	2.09	.916	1	833:00
Curtis Joseph	Toronto Maple Leafs	11	7	4	329	24	2.10	.927	3	684:56

== See also ==
- 2000–01 NHL season
- List of NHL seasons

Preceded by 2000 Stanley Cup playoffs	Stanley Cup playoffs	Succeeded by 2002 Stanley Cup playoffs
