= 1992–93 Open Russian Championship season =

Ice hockey season

The 1992–93 Open Russian Championship season was the first season of the Open Russian Championship, the second level of ice hockey in Russia. CSK VVS Samara won the championship by defeating Sibir Novosibirsk in the final.

== First round ==
=== Central Zone ===
	Club	GP	W	T	L	GF	GA	Pts
1.	Kristall Elektrostal	32	26	1	5	152	83	53
2.	Vyatich Ryazan	32	22	2	8	133	73	46
3.	Dizelist Penza	32	21	1	10	116	90	43
4.	Buran Voronezh	32	14	5	13	102	112	33
5.	Russki Variant Lipetsk	32	15	2	15	107	99	32
6.	Krylya Sovetov II	32	12	1	19	101	120	25
7.	Dynamo Moscow II	32	8	7	17	94	126	23
8.	Torpedo Nizhny Novgorod II	32	9	4	19	66	101	22
9.	CSKA Moscow II	32	4	3	25	82	149	11

=== Western Zone ===
	Club	GP	W	T	L	GF	GA	Pts
1.	Neman Grodno	36	27	5	4	169	72	59
2.	Khimik-SKA Novopolotsk	36	25	5	6	148	88	55
3.	Mars Tver	36	19	7	10	124	97	45
4.	Yarinterkom Yaroslavl	36	15	7	14	118	95	37
5.	Sokol Kiev II	36	14	4	18	101	118	32
6.	Gornyak Olenegorsk	36	12	7	17	106	125	31
7.	Metallurg Cherepovets II	36	13	2	21	109	142	28
8.	Desna Bryansk	36	11	6	19	83	117	28
9.	SKA St. Petersburg II	36	11	3	22	97	138	25
10.	Izhorets St. Petersburg	36	7	6	23	99	162	20

=== Volga Zone ===
	Club	GP	W	T	L	GF	GA	Pts
1.	CSK VVS Samara	36	22	4	10	164	101	48
2.	Sokol Novocheboksarsk	36	22	4	10	165	124	48
3.	Neftyanik Almetyevsk	36	20	6	10	129	81	46
4.	Neftekhimik Nizhnekamsk	36	18	9	9	137	131	45
5.	Olimpiya Kirovo-Chepetsk	36	18	8	10	132	96	44
6.	Progress Glazov	36	18	7	11	129	88	43
7.	TAN Kazan	36	15	8	13	119	107	28
8.	Izhstal Izhevsk	36	10	6	20	86	114	26
9.	Toros Neftekamsk	36	6	5	25	106	180	17
10.	Khimik Engels	36	2	1	33	80	225	5

=== Ural Zone ===
	Club	GP	W	T	L	GF	GA	Pts
1.	Mechel Chelyabinsk	32	22	4	6	162	80	48
2.	Rubin Tyumen	32	20	7	5	128	82	47
3.	Bulat Temirtau	32	22	2	8	141	82	46
4.	Kedr Novouralsk	32	14	4	14	94	95	32
5.	Yuzhny Ural Orsk	32	12	7	13	112	98	31
6.	Rossiya Krasnokamsk	32	12	5	15	116	126	29
7.	Novoil Ufa	32	10	3	19	90	142	23
8.	Sputnik Nizhny Tagil	32	9	1	22	85	144	19
9.	Metallurg Serov	32	5	3	24	63	142	13

=== Siberian-Far Eastern Zone ===
	Club	GP	W	T	L	GF	GA	Pts
1.	SKA Khabarovsk	40	30	2	8	177	99	62
2.	Zapolyarnik Norilsk	40	26	3	11	142	110	55
3.	Sibir Novosibirsk	40	26	2	12	185	112	54
4.	Motor Barnaul	40	14	4	12	174	134	52
5.	Amurstal Komsomolsk	40	22	1	17	99	115	45
6.	Sokol Krasnoyarsk	40	18	3	19	169	156	39
7.	Ermak Angarsk	40	15	3	22	131	165	33
8.	Shakhtyor Prokopyevsk	40	14	2	24	115	159	30
9.	Kedr Tomsk	40	11	5	24	125	134	27
10.	Metallurg Achinsk	40	12	2	26	145	223	26
11.	ShVSM Ust-Kamenogorsk	40	7	3	30	111	166	17

== Second round ==
=== Central-Western Zone ===
	Club	GP	W	T	L	GF	GA	Pts
1.	Kristall Elektrostal	18	15	0	3	97	35	30
2.	Dizelist Penza	18	13	1	4	62	41	27
3.	Mars Tver	18	11	0	7	64	53	22
4.	Vyatich Ryazan	18	10	2	6	53	44	22
5.	Neman Grodno	18	10	0	8	70	53	20
6.	Khimik-SKA Novopolotsk	18	8	4	6	60	62	20
7.	Buran Voronezh	18	7	3	8	59	53	17
8.	Russki Variant Lipetsk	18	6	1	11	63	76	13
9.	Sokol Kiev II	18	2	1	15	30	86	5
10.	Yarinterkom Yaroslavl	18	2	0	16	30	85	4

=== Volga-Ural Zone ===
	Club	GP	W	T	L	GF	GA	Pts
1.	CSK VVS Samara	18	11	3	4	93	53	25
2.	Rubin Tyumen	18	10	4	4	69	50	24
3.	Mechel Chelyabinsk	18	10	2	6	67	54	22
4.	Olimpiya Kirovo-Chepetsk	18	10	2	6	85	67	22
5.	Sokol Novocheboksarsk	18	8	4	6	69	56	20
6.	Neftekhimik Nizhnekamsk	18	9	1	7	53	55	19
7.	Bulat Temirtau	17	8	1	7	70	59	17
8.	Neftyanik Almetyevsk	18	5	3	9	45	44	13
9.	Kedr Novouralsk	17	6	0	11	50	75	12
10.	Yuzhny Ural Orsk	18	1	0	17	37	123	2

=== Siberian-Far Eastern Zone ===
	Club	GP	W	T	L	GF	GA	Pts
1.	SKA Khabarovsk	20	15	0	5	75	39	30
2.	Sibir Novosibirsk	20	13	3	4	86	51	29
3.	Zapolyarnik Norilsk	20	11	5	4	40	36	27
4.	Amurstal Komsomolsk	20	7	2	11	49	73	16
5.	Sokol Krasnoyarsk	20	6	3	11	52	85	15
6.	Motor Barnaul	20	0	3	17	21	39	3

== Playoffs ==
=== 1/8 Finals ===
- Dizelist Pensa - Sokol Novochebokarsk 2:0 (2.1 SO, 6:1)
- Mars Tver - Olimpiya Kirovo-Chepetsk 2:1 (3:2, 3:4, 4:1)
- Sibir Novosibirsk - Neman Grodno 2:1 (4:3, 4:6, 4:3)
- Vyatich Ryazan - Mechel Chelyabinsk 2:0 (3:1, 6:4)

=== Quarterfinals ===
- Mars Tver - Kristall Elektrostal 0:2 (1:2, 2:9)
- Sibir Novosibirsk - Rubin Tyumen 2:0 (5:0, 3:0)
- Dizelist Penza - CSK VVS Samara 1:2 (2:3, 5:0 Forfeit, 3:4)
- Vyatich Ryazan - SKA Khabarovsk 0:2 (1:2, 4:5)

=== Semifinals ===
- Sibir Novosibirsk - Kristall Elektrostal 3:2 (3:5, 0:5, 4:2, 3:1, 5:4 OT)
- CSK VVS Samara - SKA Khabarovsk 3:2 (3:1, 6:2, 0:4, 2:4, 8:4)

=== Final ===
- CSK VVS Samara - Sibir Novosibirsk 3:0 (6:4, 6:4, 3:1)

=== Placing games ===
7th place

- Olimpiya Kirovo-Chepetsk - Sokol Novocheboksarsk 2:0 (7:5, 6:5)

5th place

- Vyatich Ryazan - Dizelist Penza 2:0 (7:2, 3:2)

== Placing round ==
=== Central-Western Zone ===
	Club	GP	W	T	L	GF	GA	Pts
1.	Gornyak Olenegorsk	36	25	1	10			51
2.	Torpedo Nizhny Novgorod II	36	23	1	12			47
3.	CSKA Moscow II	36	18	8	10			44
4.	Krylya Sovetov Moscow II	36	17	6	13			40
5.	Khimik Engels	36	16	3	17			35
6.	Dynamo Moscow II	36	14	5	17			33
7.	Metallurg Cherepovets II	36	13	5	18			31
8.	SKA St. Petersburg II	36	11	6	19			28
9.	Desna Bryansk	36	10	6	20			26
10.	Izhorets St. Petersburg	36	10	5	21			25

=== Volga-Ural Zone ===
	Club	GP	W	T	L	GF	GA	Pts
1.	TAN Kazan	28	19	4	5	101	56	42
2.	Sputnik Nizhny Tagil	28	18	1	9	109	76	37
3.	Rossiya Krasnokamsk	28	16	1	11	98	75	33
4.	Metallurg Serov	28	13	3	12	96	89	29
5.	Progress Glazov	28	11	5	12	83	93	27
6.	Novoil Ufa	28	12	0	16	68	87	24
7.	Toros Neftekamsk	28	7	3	18	80	114	17
8.	Izhstal Izhevsk	28	7	1	20	62	107	15
