= Johan Hedberg =

Swedish ice hockey player (born 1973)

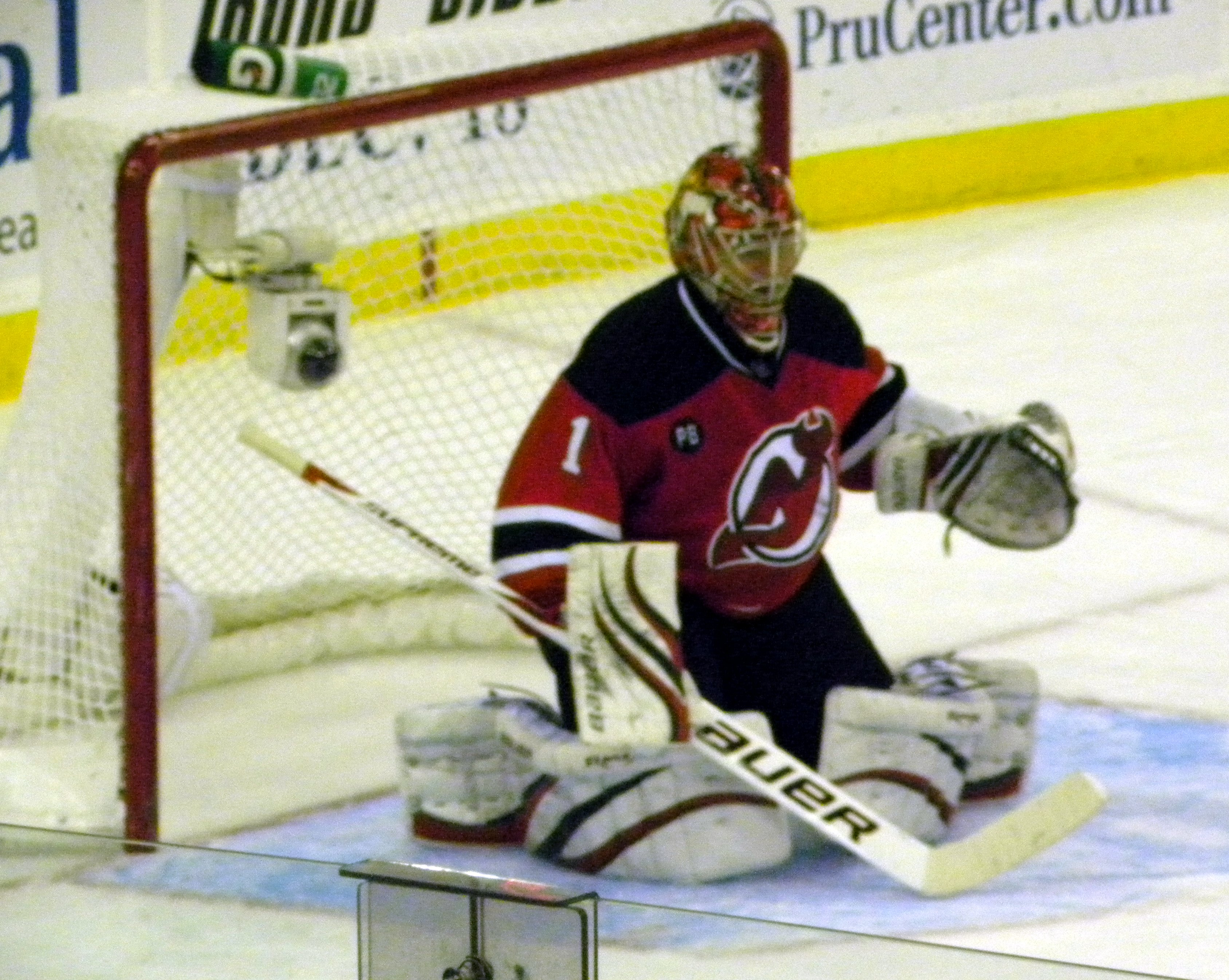
- Hedberg with the New Jersey Devils in 2010
- Born: 5 May 1973 (age 53) Nacka, Sweden
- Height: 6 ft 0 in (183 cm)
- Weight: 185 lb (84 kg; 13 st 3 lb)
- Position: Goaltender
- Caught: Left
- Played for: Pittsburgh Penguins; Vancouver Canucks; Leksands IF; Dallas Stars; Atlanta Thrashers; New Jersey Devils
- NHL draft: 218th overall, 1994; Philadelphia Flyers
- Playing career: 1993–2014
Medal record
Men's Ice hockey
Representing Sweden
World Championships
Gold medal – first place	1998 Switzerland
Silver medal – second place	1997 Finland
Bronze medal – third place	1999 Norway
Bronze medal – third place	1994 Italy

Johan "Moose" Hedberg (born 5 May 1973) is a Swedish former professional ice hockey goaltender. During a career that lasted from 1993 to 2014 he played for the Pittsburgh Penguins, Vancouver Canucks, Dallas Stars, Atlanta Thrashers, and New Jersey Devils of the National Hockey League (NHL), as well as Leksands IF of the Swedish Elitserien, as well as several minor league teams. After several years in Sweden Hedberg moved to North America in 1997 and made his NHL debut in 2000. Internationally he played for the Swedish national team at several tournaments, including the 2002 Winter Olympics and several World Championships, winning gold at the 1998 World Championship.

== Playing career ==
=== Drafted by the Flyers ===
Hedberg was drafted in the ninth round, 218th overall, in the 1994 NHL entry draft by the Philadelphia Flyers. However the Flyers never invited him from Sweden to a training camp. He was told by the Flyers that he needed to make the Swedish national team, before getting an invitation to training camp. Hedberg spent five seasons with Leksands IF from 1992–97, notching a 2.79 goals against average (GAA) in 116 games. and did make the Swedish team, however he never received the invitation promised to him. He then left Sweden, in 1997, to find work in the North American minor leagues, hoping that a team would notice his abilities. He started with the Baton Rouge Kingfish of the East Coast Hockey League and also played for the Detroit Vipers and Manitoba Moose of the International Hockey League before the Flyers traded Hedberg's rights to the San Jose Sharks in 1998. He returned to Leksands for the 1998-99 season before reporting to San Jose's affiliate, the American Hockey League's Kentucky Thoroughblades for the 1999-2000 season.

=== Manitoba Moose ===
At the time, the Sharks were already loaded with terrific goaltenders, all younger than Hedberg, who was ranked no higher than 4th on the Sharks' goaltending depth chart, so after one season, he left the Sharks organization and rejoined Manitoba. Hedberg excelled during his second stint with the Moose in 2000–01, while they were still an unaffiliated team in the final season of the International Hockey League. His play was noticed by the Pittsburgh Penguins' assistant general manager Eddie Johnston. In March 2001, Randy Carlyle, the Moose's coach, pulled Hedberg aside at Winnipeg International Airport and told him he'd been traded to Pittsburgh, along with Bobby Dollas, in exchange for Jeff Norton. He was also informed, by Carlyle, that he was reporting directly to the Penguins.

=== Pittsburgh Penguins and the Olympics ===
Hedberg went on to stabilize the Penguins' goaltending position for the remainder of the 2000–01 season. Since Hedberg started a game in Pittsburgh on late notice, still wearing his customized Manitoba Moose helmet which, not surprisingly, had a large moose painted across it, the Pittsburgh crowds quickly nicknamed him "Moose", and would cheer for him after a spectacular save by yelling "Mooooose". This was often heard incorrectly as a boo.

He then outdueled Olaf Kölzig, of the Washington Capitals, and Dominik Hašek, of the Buffalo Sabres, to help the Penguins reach the Eastern Conference final. In 2002, Hedberg set career highs with 25 wins and a club-record 66 games with the Penguins. He was then named as the back-up goalie to Tommy Salo, on the Swedish national team and played in the 2002 Winter Olympics. Hedberg started one game for Sweden, posting a victory over Germany.

=== Vancouver, the lockout and Dallas ===
He was finally traded to the Vancouver Canucks by Pittsburgh for a second-round selection in the 2004 NHL entry draft. The Penguins would later use that pick to draft Alex Goligoski. He registered a career-best 2.51 GAA in 21 games with Vancouver during the 2003–04 season. He spent the 2004–05 season playing with Leksands IF of the Swedish Second Division, due to the NHL lockout. There he notched a 2.12 GAA in 21 games.

Once the lockout ended, Hedberg signed with the Dallas Stars as a free agent on 5 August 2005. He then posted a 12-4-1 record and a 2.67 GAA in 19 games with the Stars. On 26 December 2005, Hedberg recorded two assists in a game against the St. Louis Blues. This is the first time a Dallas Stars goalie has ever accomplished this feat, and the first time any goalie in the NHL has done it since Patrick Roy on 29 December 2000. One assist came from a pass that met Stars captain Mike Modano at the Blues' blue line, granting him a 1-on-1 opportunity.

=== Atlanta Thrashers ===
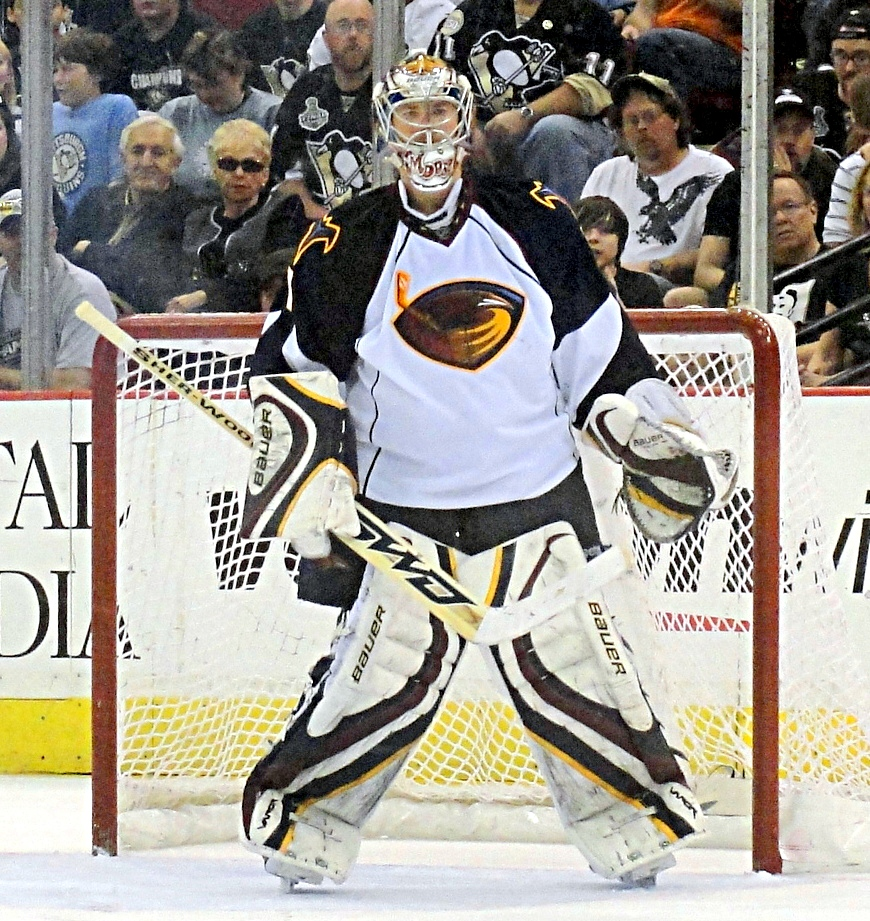
With the Thrashers in 2010.

Hedberg signed a two-year contract with Atlanta in July 2006 and served as the backup for starter Kari Lehtonen during the first year of that contract. However, a long-term injury hindered Lehtonen during the 2007–08 season and Hedberg took over as Atlanta's starting goaltender for much of the season. On 16 June 2008, Hedberg signed a multi-year contract extension with the Thrashers. During the 2009–10 season, he shared time with Ondrej Pavelec as the primary starter after Lehtonen missed most of the season and was then traded. Despite Hedberg's good performance he and the Thrashers parted ways after the season.

In May 2011, while the Thrashers relocated to Winnipeg to become the Winnipeg Jets, Hedberg expressed both regrets for the franchise's relocation and sympathy for the Thrashers fan-base. He stated; "I think it’s sad for the city. I believe this city can support a team and support it in a good way. Obviously, it’s been some chaotic years pretty much from day one with ownership not being on the same page and I think that has hurt the franchise quite a bit...We’ve kind of made this sort of our second home for five years now and, obviously, the Thrashers were the reason we came here in the first place," Hedberg said. "I know all the people involved. I know all the people working in the front office and in hockey operations and I know a lot of the fans around. They’re hard-core fans that really don’t want to lose the team. So, I would have feeling of (sadness). There’s no doubt this could be a good hockey city, but it needs to be done the right way. This ownership has never given it a chance to do that after it got off on the wrong foot."

Hedberg's family, which includes his wife and three daughters, still lives in Atlanta.

=== New Jersey Devils ===
On 1 July 2010, Hedberg signed a one-year deal with the New Jersey Devils, which included a no-trade clause. He served as a back-up goalie until starter Martin Brodeur suffered a 6 February injury. His contract was renewed on 1 July 2011, which again included a no-trade clause. During round one of the 2012 Stanley Cup Playoffs, he was called on to play two periods in game three versus the Florida Panthers.

On 2 July 2012, Hedberg signed a two-year deal with the Devils. The contract included a no-trade clause. The signing came hours after New Jersey extended the contract of Brodeur two years as well. Hedberg and Brodeur's age would be 41 and 42 respectively when their individual contracts expired.

On 4 July 2013, Hedberg was placed on unconditional waivers for the intentions of a compliance buyout. The Devils bought him out as a result of a trade that sent Vancouver Canucks goaltender Cory Schneider to New Jersey.

=== New York Rangers ===
Hedberg signed a professional tryout with the New York Rangers on 10 September 2013, in the absence of backup goaltender Martin Biron. On 18 September 2013, soon after Biron's return, Hedberg was released from his contract. Hedberg's final professional game was played with the Albany Devils during the 2013–14 season when he was signed to a professional tryout agreement with the American Hockey League team, filling in for the injured Keith Kinkaid.

== Coaching career ==
After retiring from playing, Hedberg rejoined the Devils organisation as a special assignment scout under head coach Peter DeBoer; he also served as goaltending coach of the Albany Devils. On 2 July 2015, he rejoined DeBoer with the San Jose Sharks as their goaltending coach. Hedberg remained in the role until DeBoer and his staff were fired on 11 December 2019.

== Career statistics ==
=== Regular season and playoffs ===
Bold indicates led league

			Regular season										Playoffs
Season	Team	League	GP	W	L	T	OT	MIN	GA	SO	GAA	SV%	GP	W	L	MIN	GA	SO	GAA	SV%
1989–90	Leksands IF	SWE U20	—	—	—	—	—	—	—	—	—	—	—	—	—	—	—	—	—	—
1990–91	Leksands IF	SWE-U20	—	—	—	—	—	—	—	—	—	—	—	—	—	—	—	—	—	—
1991–92	Leksands IF	SWE2-U20	—	—	—	—	—	—	—	—	—	—	—	—	—	—	—	—	—	—
1992–93	Leksands IF	SEL	10	—	—	—	—	600	24	—	2.40	—	—	—	—	—	—	—	—	—
1993–94	Leksands IF	SEL	17	—	—	—	—	1020	48	—	2.82	—	—	—	—	—	—	—	—	—
1994–95	Leksands IF	SEL	17	—	—	—	—	986	58	—	3.53	—	—	—	—	—	—	—	—	—
1995–96	Leksands IF	SEL	34	—	—	—	—	2013	95	—	2.83	—	4	—	—	240	13	—	3.25	—
1996–97	Leksands IF	SEL	38	—	—	—	—	2260	95	3	2.52	—	8	—	—	581	18	1	1.86	—
1997–98	Baton Rouge Kingfish	ECHL	2	1	1	0	—	100	58	7	4.20	.879	—	—	—	—	—	—	—	—
1997–98	Detroit Vipers	IHL	16	7	2	2	—	726	32	1	2.64	.899	—	—	—	—	—	—	—	—
1997–98	Manitoba Moose	IHL	14	8	4	1	—	745	32	1	2.58	.922	2	—	—	105	6	0	3.40	—
1998–99	Leksands IF	SEL	48	—	—	—	—	2940	140	0	2.86	.903	4	—	—	255	15	0	3.53	—
1999–00	Kentucky Thoroughblades	AHL	33	18	9	5	—	1973	88	3	2.68	.917	5	—	—	311	10	1	1.93	.950
2000–01	Manitoba Moose	IHL	46	23	13	7	—	2697	115	1	2.56	.912	—	—	—	—	—	—	—	—
2000–01	Pittsburgh Penguins	NHL	9	7	1	1	—	545	24	0	2.64	.905	18	9	9	1124	43	2	2.30	.911
2001–02	Pittsburgh Penguins	NHL	66	25	**34**	7	—	3877	178	6	2.76	.904	—	—	—	—	—	—	—	—
2002–03	Pittsburgh Penguins	NHL	41	14	22	4	—	2411	126	1	3.14	.895	—	—	—	—	—	—	—	—
2003–04	Vancouver Canucks	NHL	21	8	6	2	—	1098	46	3	2.51	.900	2	1	1	99	4	0	2.45	.922
2003–04	Manitoba Moose	AHL	2	0	2	0	—	125	9	0	4.32	.883	—	—	—	—	—	—	—	—
2004–05	Leksands IF	SEL	21	—	—	—	—	1274	45	1	2.12	—	—	—	—	—	—	—	—	—
2005–06	Dallas Stars	NHL	19	12	4	—	1	1079	48	0	2.67	.898	—	—	—	—	—	—	—	—
2006–07	Atlanta Thrashers	NHL	21	9	4	—	2	1058	51	0	2.89	.898	2	0	2	118	5	0	2.56	.928
2007–08	Atlanta Thrashers	NHL	36	14	15	—	3	1928	111	1	3.46	.892	—	—	—	—	—	—	—	—
2008–09	Atlanta Thrashers	NHL	33	13	12	—	3	1717	100	0	3.49	.886	—	—	—	—	—	—	—	—
2009–10	Atlanta Thrashers	NHL	47	21	16	—	6	2632	115	3	2.62	.915	—	—	—	—	—	—	—	—
2010–11	New Jersey Devils	NHL	34	15	12	—	2	1718	68	3	2.38	.912	—	—	—	—	—	—	—	—
2011–12	New Jersey Devils	NHL	27	17	7	—	2	1592	59	4	2.23	.918	1	0	1	37	1	0	1.67	.929
2012–13	New Jersey Devils	NHL	19	6	10	—	3	1109	51	1	2.76	.883	—	—	—	—	—	—	—	—
2013–14	Albany Devils	AHL	1	0	0	—	0	38	2	0	3.18	.846	—	—	—	—	—	—	—	—
NHL totals			373	161	143	14	22	20,759	977	22	2.82	.901	23	10	13	1375	53	2	2.31	.914

=== International ===
Year	Team	Event	GP	W	L	T	MIN	GA	SO	GAA	SV%
1994	Sweden	WC	DNP	—	—	—	—	—	—	—	—
1996	Sweden	WCH	DNP	—	—	—	—	—	—	—	—
1997	Sweden	WC	1				60	1	0	1.00	.938
1998	Sweden	OG	DNP	—	—	—	—	—	—	—	—
1998	Sweden	WC	1	1	0	0	60	2	0	2.00	.867
1999	Sweden	WC	1	0	0	0	1	0	0	0.00	1.000
2002	Sweden	OG	1	1	0	0	60	1	0	1.00	.950
Senior totals			4	—	—	—	181	4	0	1.33	—
