= Sergei Brylin =

Russian ice hockey player (born 1974)

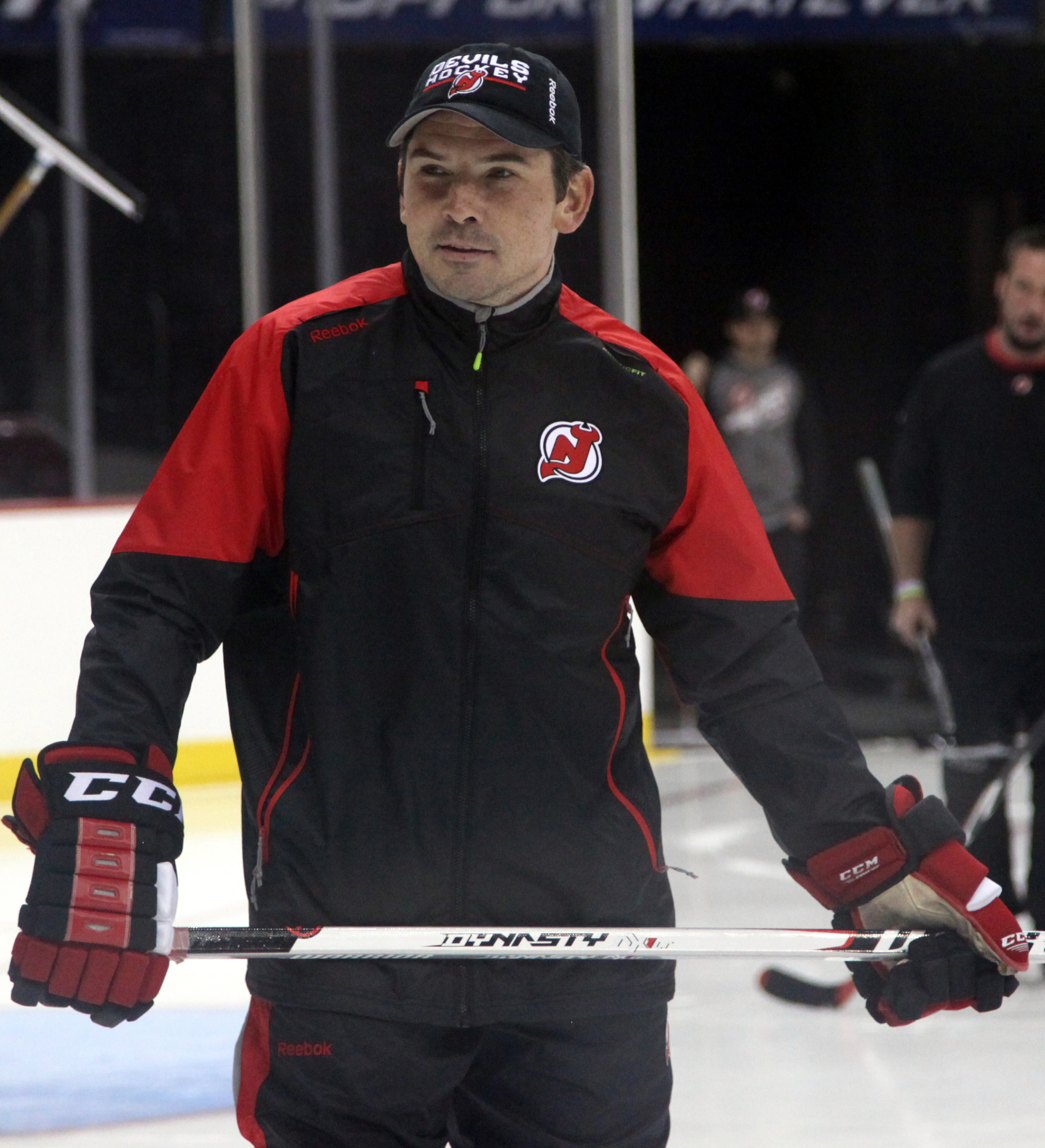
- Brylin in September 2015
- Born: January 13, 1974 (age 52) Moscow, Russian SFSR, Soviet Union
- Height: 5 ft 10 in (178 cm)
- Weight: 188 lb (85 kg; 13 st 6 lb)
- Position: Centre/Winger
- Shot: Left
- Played for: CSKA Moscow; Russian Penguins; New Jersey Devils; Khimik Voskresensk; SKA St. Petersburg; Metallurg Novokuznetsk
- National team: Russia
- NHL draft: 42nd overall, 1992; New Jersey Devils
- Playing career: 1991–2012

Sergei Vladimirovich Brylin (Russian: Серге́й Влади́мирович Бры́лин; born January 13, 1974) is a Russian professional ice hockey coach and former player who is formerly an assistant coach for the New Jersey Devils of the National Hockey League (NHL) and currently the head coach of HC Dinamo Minsk. Brylin played with the Devils from 1995 to 2008 and is a three-time Stanley Cup champion with the team.

== Playing career ==
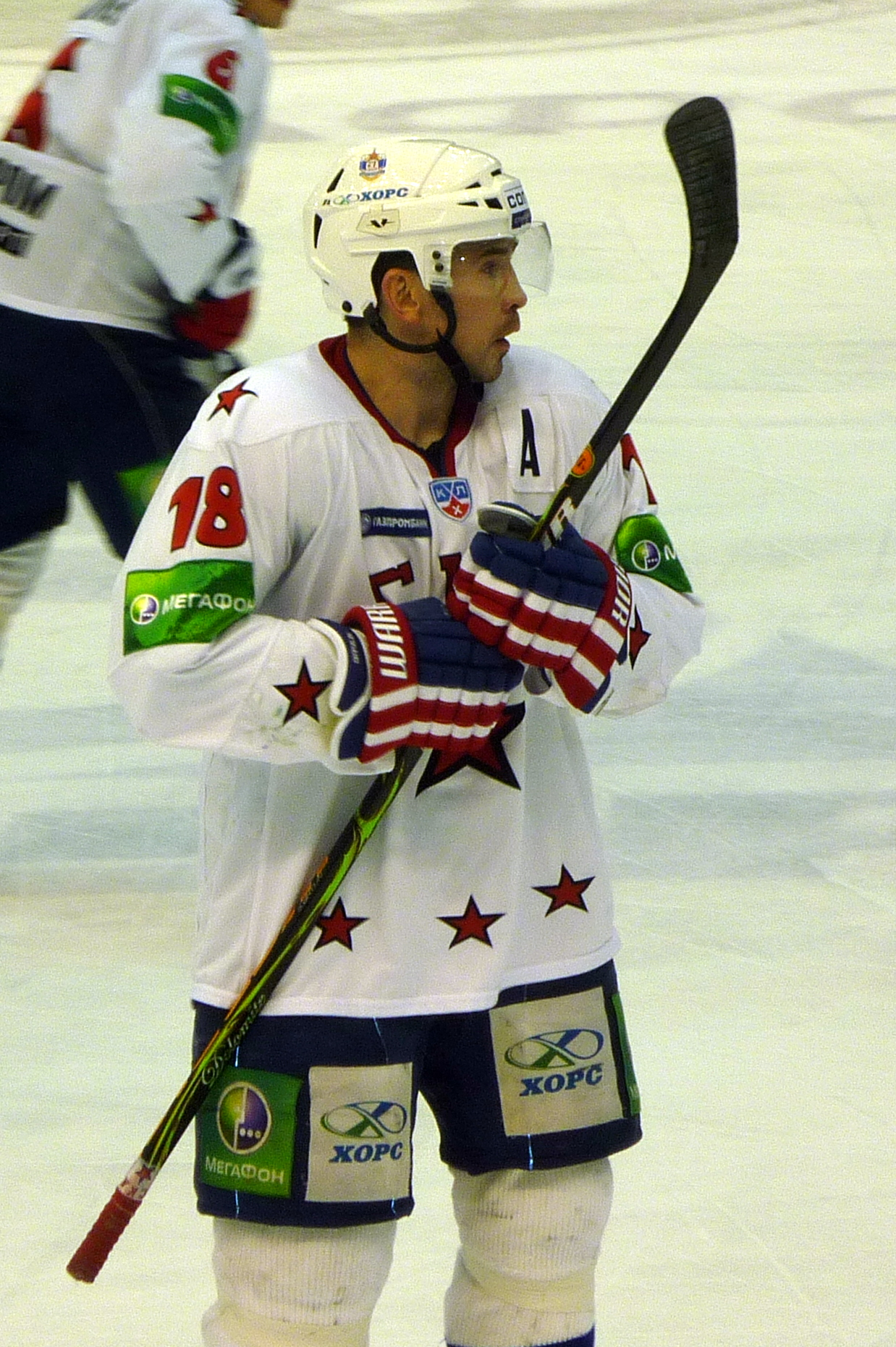
Brylin in December 2010.

Brylin made his NHL debut on February 17, 1995, and scored his first NHL goal on February 27. Brylin won three Stanley Cups with the New Jersey Devils in 1995, 2000 and 2003. He is one of five Devils who have played for all three of their championship teams, the only others being Martin Brodeur, Scott Niedermayer, Scott Stevens and Ken Daneyko.

On July 1, 2008, the Devils turned down the option to have Brylin return for another year. Ten days later, he signed with SKA Saint Petersburg of the Kontinental Hockey League (KHL). After hopes of returning to the Devils for one more season faded, Brylin signed with Metallurg Novokuznetsk for the 2011–12 KHL season. In 2023, Brylin was inducted as the second member of the New Jersey Devils Ring of Honor.

== Coaching career ==
Brylin was an assistant coach and associate coach for the Albany Devils (2012–2017), Binghamton Devils (2017–2021) and Utica Comets (2021–2022), the American Hockey League (AHL) affiliates of the New Jersey Devils. In August 2022, he was named an assistant coach of the New Jersey Devils.

Brylin was named head coach of HC Dinamo Minsk in July 2026.

== Career statistics ==
=== Regular season and playoffs ===
			Regular season					Playoffs
Season	Team	League	GP	G	A	Pts	PIM	GP	G	A	Pts	PIM
1991–92	CSKA Moscow	CIS	36	1	6	7	2	8	0	0	0	2
1991–92	CSKA Moscow-2	CIS-3	1	0	0	0	0	—	—	—	—	—
1992–93	CSKA Moscow	RUS	42	5	4	9	36	—	—	—	—	—
1992–93	CSKA Moscow-2	RUS-2	3	2	1	3	4	—	—	—	—	—
1993–94	CSKA Moscow	RUS	39	4	6	10	36	3	1	0	1	2
1993–94	Russian Penguins	IHL	13	4	5	9	18	—	—	—	—	—
1994–95	Albany River Rats	AHL	63	19	35	54	78	—	—	—	—	—
1994–95	New Jersey Devils	NHL	26	6	8	14	8	12	1	2	3	4
1995–96	New Jersey Devils	NHL	50	4	5	9	26	—	—	—	—	—
1996–97	New Jersey Devils	NHL	29	2	2	4	20	—	—	—	—	—
1996–97	Albany River Rats	AHL	43	17	23	40	38	16	4	8	12	12
1997–98	New Jersey Devils	NHL	18	2	3	5	0	—	—	—	—	—
1997–98	Albany River Rats	AHL	44	21	22	43	60	—	—	—	—	—
1998–99	New Jersey Devils	NHL	47	5	10	15	28	5	3	1	4	4
1999–00	New Jersey Devils	NHL	64	9	11	20	20	17	3	5	8	0
2000–01	New Jersey Devils	NHL	75	23	29	52	24	20	3	4	7	6
2001–02	New Jersey Devils	NHL	76	16	28	44	10	6	0	2	2	2
2002–03	New Jersey Devils	NHL	52	11	8	19	16	19	1	3	4	8
2003–04	New Jersey Devils	NHL	82	14	19	33	20	5	0	0	0	0
2004–05	Khimik Voskresensk	RSL	35	8	19	27	40	—	—	—	—	—
2005–06	New Jersey Devils	NHL	82	15	22	37	46	9	2	0	2	2
2006–07	New Jersey Devils	NHL	82	16	24	40	35	11	1	2	3	6
2007–08	New Jersey Devils	NHL	82	6	10	16	20	5	1	0	1	0
2008–09	SKA St. Petersburg	KHL	50	9	15	24	16	3	0	2	2	2
2009–10	SKA St. Petersburg	KHL	56	8	12	20	32	4	0	0	0	0
2010–11	SKA St. Petersburg	KHL	49	7	5	12	8	11	1	5	6	4
2011–12	Metallurg Novokuznetsk	KHL	41	5	4	9	28	—	—	—	—	—
KHL totals			196	29	36	65	84	18	1	7	8	6
NHL totals			765	129	179	308	273	109	15	19	34	32

=== International ===
Year	Team	Event	GP	G	A	Pts	PIM
1992	Russia	EJC	6	1	1	2	4
1993	Russia	WJC	7	3	3	6	6
1994	Russia	WJC	7	1	5	6	0
1996	Russia	WC	8	3	2	5	12
2007	Russia	WC	2	0	0	0	0
Junior totals			20	5	9	14	10
Senior totals			10	3	2	5	12

== See also ==
- List of NHL players who spent their entire career with one franchise
