= Yantar Seversk =

- City: Seversk, Russia
- Founded: 1965
- Colours: Red, Blue, White

Yantar Seversk is a formerly ice hockey team in Seversk, Russia. They played in the Pervaya Liga, the third level of Russian ice hockey. The club was founded in 1965 and folded in 2014.
