= Russian Penguins =

- City: Moscow, Russia
- League: IHL
- Operated: 1993-1994
- Colors: Red and White
- Owner(s): Howard Baldwin
- Head coach: Viktor Tikhonov

Franchise history
- 1960-1993: HC CSKA Moscow
- 1993-1994: Russian Penguins
- 1996-present: HC CSKA Moscow

The Russian Penguins were a professional touring Russian ice hockey club that competed in the 1993–94 IHL season, playing one game against each of the 13 teams involved in the regular IHL season. The results of the games played by the Russian Penguins counted in the standings for that season. The Penguins finished with a record of 2 wins, 9 losses, and 2 overtime losses earning them 6 points.

In 1993, Pittsburgh Penguins owner Howard Baldwin bought a 50% interest in the struggling HC CSKA Moscow team and signed a management contract to run that club's arena. The aim was to provide the team with Western sponsorship and much-needed capital, as well as providing the Pittsburgh club with easier access to Russian players. The partnership lasted two years until Baldwin and other sponsors pulled out.

Nikolai Khabibulin was the most notable player on that roster. Other roster highlights included former first-round draft pick Yan Golubovsky and former New Jersey Devils forward Sergei Brylin.

The history of the Pittsburgh Penguins investment in the team is chronicled in Gabe Polsky's 2019 documentary Red Penguins. The film features interviews with Howard Baldwin, Steven Warshaw, and CSKA General Manager at the time Valery Gushin.

== Team statistics ==
Players

#	Player	GP	G	A	Pts	PIM
23	Andrei Vasilyev	13	10	6	16	4
12	Sergei Brylin	13	4	5	9	18
21	Valentin Morozov	11	3	5	8	2
9	Denis Vinokurov	13	3	3	6	12
16	Vladislav Yakovenko	6	0	6	6	10
5	Oleg Belov	11	3	2	5	10
22	Albert Leschev	12	2	3	5	4
7	Alexander Osadchy	11	0	5	5	24
17	Alexander Kharlamov	12	2	2	4	4
13	Vladimir Zhashkov	9	2	1	3	19
24	Mikhail Belobragin	7	1	2	3	2
38	Boris Zelenko	9	1	2	3	0
27	Roman Mozgunov	8	2	0	2	4
3	Andrei Yakovenko	3	1	1	2	2
6	Vasily Turkovsky	6	0	2	2	11
28	Yuri Yuresko	6	0	2	2	16
--	Artur Oktyabrev	10	0	2	2	12
11	Dmitri Gorenko	8	1	0	1	2
--	Sergei Reshetnikov	5	0	1	1	2
--	Alexei Ysaikin	6	0	1	1	10
2	Sergei Selyanin	9	0	1	1	24
4	Stanislav Shalnov	2	0	0	0	2
31	Sergei Zvyagin (G)	4	0	0	0	0
25	Yan Golubovsky	8	0	0	0	23
39	Alexander Titov	9	0	0	0	8
1	Nikolai Khabibulin (G)	12	0	0	0	0
	Bench	13	0	0	0	4
	Totals	13	35	52	87	229

Goalkeepers

Goalie	GP	Min	GA	GAA	W	L	T	Svs	Pct	EN	SO
Nikolai Khabibulin	12	639	47	4.41	2	7	2	323	0.873	1	0
Sergei Zvyagin	4	140	14	6.00	0	2	0	58	0.806	0	0
Totals	13	779	61	4.70	2	9	2	381	0.862	1	0
