= HC Bryansk =

- City: Bryansk, Russia
- League: Junior Hockey League Division B
- Founded: 1957
- Home arena: Desna Stadium
- Colours: Blue, White

HC Bryansk is an ice hockey team in Bryansk, Russia. They play in the Junior Hockey League Division B, the second level of Russian junior ice hockey. The club was founded as Dinamo Bryansk in 1957 and was renamed HC Bryansk in 2008.
