= 1993–94 Elitnaya Liga season =

Russian ice hockey league season

The 1993–94 Elitnaya Liga season was the second season of the Elitnaya Liga, the second-level of ice hockey in Russia. 13 teams participated in the league, and CSK VVS Samara won the league championship.

== Regular season ==
	Club	GP	W	T	L	GF	GA	Pts
1.	CSK VVS Samara	48	37	6	5	187	80	80
2.	SKA Khabarovsk	48	29	6	13	138	131	64
3.	Rubin Tyumen	48	29	5	14	157	108	63
4.	Zapolyarnik Norilsk	48	30	3	15	121	110	63
5.	HK Sibir Novosibirsk	48	26	5	17	167	127	57
6.	Olimpiya Kirovo-Chepetsk	48	24	5	19	145	111	53
7.	Kristall Elektrostal	48	23	6	19	153	133	52
8.	HK Mechel Chelyabinsk	48	22	5	21	129	142	49
9.	Amurstal Komsomolsk	48	20	2	26	79	92	42
10.	Sokol Novocheboksarsk	48	18	5	25	149	165	41
11.	Dizelist Penza	48	12	7	29	107	156	31
12.	Progress Glazov	48	8	5	35	121	162	21
13.	Yuzhny Ural Orsk	48	3	2	43	93	229	8
