= Alexander Titov (ice hockey) =

Russian ice hockey player

- Born: 14 April 1975 (age 51) Lipetsk, Soviet Union
- Height: 6 ft 2 in (188 cm)
- Weight: 212 lb (96 kg; 15 st 2 lb)
- Position: Defenceman
- Shot: Left
- Played for: CSKA Moscow; Russian Penguins; HC Lipetsk; Amur Khabarovsk; Neftekhimik Nizhnekamsk; Lada Togliatti; Khimik Mytishchy; SKA Saint Petersburg; Avangard Omsk; Barys Astana; Avtomobilist Yekaterinburg
- National team: Russia
- NHL draft: Undrafted
- Playing career: 1993–2009

Alexander Nikolaevich Titov (Russian: Александр Николаевич Титов; born 14 April 1975) is a retired Russian professional ice hockey defenceman.
