= Sokol Novocheboksarsk =

- City: Novocheboksarsk, Russia
- League: VHL-B
- Founded: 1975
- Folded: 2016
- Home arena: LD Sokol
- Colours: Black, White, Red
- Website: Official website

Sokol Novocheboksarsk was an ice hockey team in Novocheboksarsk, Russia. They played in the VHL-B, the third level of Russian ice hockey. The club was founded in 1975 and folded in 2016.
