= HC Shakhtyor Prokopyevsk =

HC Shakhytor Prokopyevsk
- City: Prokopyevsk, Russia
- League: Pervaya Liga
- Founded: 1960
- Colours: Black, Red, White

HC Shakhtyor Prokopyevsk is an ice hockey team in Prokopyevsk, Russia. The club plays in the Pervaya Liga, the third level of ice hockey in Russia. They were founded in 1960.
