= Progress Glazov =

- City: Glazov, Russia
- League: Junior Hockey League Division B
- Founded: 1954
- Home arena: Progress Sports Palace
- Colours: Blue, White, Red

Progress Glazov is an ice hockey team in Glazov, Russia. They play in the Junior Hockey League Division B, the second level of Russian junior ice hockey.

== History ==
The club was founded in 1954 as Traktor Glazov. They changed their name to Torpedo Glazov in 1957, before taking on their current name, Progress Glazov, in 1962.
