= Ice hockey at the 2011 Asian Winter Games – Men's tournament =

Hockey tournament

Men at the 2011 Asian Winter Games
- Venue: Kazakhstan Sports Palace
- Date: 28 January – 6 February 2011
- Competitors: 248 from 12 nations

Medalists
gold medal	Kazakhstan
silver medal	Japan
bronze medal	South Korea

The men's tournament of Ice hockey at the 2011 Asian Winter Games at Astana, Kazakhstan, was held from 28 January to 6 February 2011.

== Squads ==
Athletes from Kuwait	Bahrain	China	Chinese Taipei
Jasem Dashti; Shuaib Al-Shuaib; Mohammad Al-Maragi; Fahad Al-Henaidi; Mohammad Al-Duaij; Abdullah Al-Maragi; Mohammad Al-Ajmi; Anwar Al-Attar; Jasem Al-Awadhi; Hamad Al-Shayji; Ahmad Al-Ajmi; Hussain Baqer; Yousef Al-Kandari; Meshal Al-Ajmi; Abdullah Al-Noman; Ebrahim Mohammad; Faisal Atallah; Abdullah Al-Zaidan; Abdulaziz Shetail; Jasem Al-Sarraf; Salem Al-Ajmi	Abdulla Al-Adhab; Mohamed Al-Doy; Hasan Al-Mushiqeri; Abdulla Turki; Thamer Fakhroo; Yosuf Jameel Baqer; Shuaib Al-Jawder; Salman Al-Thawadi; Ali Hamad Al-Mutlaq; Nooh Mohamed Ismaeel; Saud Sulaibeekh; Abdulla Janahi; Sameh Hegazi; Abdulla Al-Qasemi; Abdulla Jafar Ahmed; Mohamed Danly; Abdulrahman Turki	Zhang Weiyang; Jiang Nan; Wang Chongwei; Liu Wei; Wang Dahai; Li Wensi; Li Zhengyu; Guo Dachuan; Qu Yidong; Li Jian; Liu Zhiwei; Chen Zhipeng; Liu Longtan; Zhang Hao; Han Pengfei; Liu Yingkui; Fu Tengyi; Ge Tian; Jiang Hongchao; Hu Tianyu; Chen Ling; Dou Hao; Li Kexin	Ting Pang-keng; Weng To; Huang Yi-chung; Lu Po-hao; Lu Li-feng; Shen Yen-chin; Shen Yen-lin; Lin Yi-fan; Yu Kai-wen; Huang Yuan-long; Tsai Po-chuan; Yang Chang-lin; Lin Hung-ju; Lin Tsung-han; Chang Hsing-han; Chou Kang; Cheng Chung-yu
Japan	Kazakhstan	Kyrgyzstan	Malaysia
Jun Tonosaki; Aaron Keller; Makoto Kawashima; Masato Domeki; Yosuke Kon; Masahito Suzuki; Masahito Nishiwaki; Yosuke Haga; Masafumi Ogawa; Go Tanaka; Takahito Suzuki; Takeshi Saito; Takafumi Yamashita; Shuhei Kuji; Hideyuki Osawa; Hiroki Ueno; Bin Ishioka; Takuma Kawai; Yutaka Fukufuji; Masahito Haruna; Shinya Yanadori	Vitaliy Yeremeyev; Roman Savchenko; Vitaliy Novopashin; Alexey Litvinenko; Maxim Semenov; Talgat Zhailauov; Yevgeniy Blokhin; Dmitriy Upper; Vitaliy Kolesnik; Ilya Solarev; Fedor Polishchuk; Dmitriy Dudarev; Maxim Belyayev; Yevgeniy Bumagin; Alexey Vassilchenko; Ivan Poloshkov; Andrey Gavrilin; Yevgeniy Fadeyev; Roman Starchenko; Maxim Khudyakov; Alexey Koledayev; Vadim Krasnoslobodtsev; Yevgeniy Rymarev	Pavel Fitisenko; Pavel Sazonov; Yury Zhuravlyov; Sultan Tokoev; Turdaly Askarbekov; Sergey Sorokin; Igor Kryukov; Azamat Shiderinov; Denis Alexeyev; Salamat Tynaliev; Amanbek Esen Uulu; Urmat Sheishenaliev; Ivan Fillippov; Kirill Kudayarov; Zhirgalbek Bakirov; Sergey Ossintsev; Anvarbek Omorkanov; Artyom Kolobov; Denis Falfudinov; Dmitriy Kabanov; Vladimir Sorokin; Ramis Toktaliev	Jeremy Chee; Yap Eu Jin; Aris Samad Yahaya; Edmond Ng; Loke Ban Kin; Tan Khia Peng; Yeoh Keong Yau; Tan Kay Seng; Gabriel Ong; Jamil David; Ahmad Bazli; Khoo Seng Chee; Andy Chang; Vincent Loh; Brandon Tan; Abdul Hakim Ismail; Tengku Azlly; Moi Jia Yung; Haniff Mahmood; Reezman Isa
Mongolia	South Korea	Thailand	United Arab Emirates
Altansangiin Erkhbayar; Zorigtyn Batgerel; Dorjsürengiin Zolboo; Enkhtöriin Mönkhzayaa; Zorigoogiin Od-Erdene; Angaagiin Enkhbat; Ochiryn Erdenebat; Pürevdorjiin Batzayaa; Altankhundagiin Altanbayar; Davaasürengiin Bolor-Erdene; Chuluunbatyn Pürev-Ochir; Baatarkhüügiin Tserenbaljir; Enkhjargalyn Bayarjargal; Namjilyn Mishigsüren; Batsükhiin Battör; Bazarvaany Baatarkhüü; Erdenebilegiin Chuluunzorig	Park Sung-je; Lee Don-ku; Kim Woo-jae; Ahn Hyun-min; Kim Dong-hwan; Kim Won-jung; Cho Min-ho; Kim Yoon-hwan; Kim Ki-sung; Kim Sang-wook; Suh Sin-il; Lee Yong-jun; Kwon Tae-an; Kim Kyu-hun; Kim Geun-ho; Choi Jung-sik; Shin Sang-woo; Song Dong-hwan; Kim Hyun-soo; Park Woo-sang; Kim Hyeok; Eum Hyun-seung	Pongsak Phiewklam; Tewin Chartsuwan; Arthit Thamwongsin; Dechbadin Jittranont; Nitat Thammasit; Pasit Jirachai; Teerasak Rattanachot; Nattapong Harnnarujchai; Songsak Choodokmai; Anun Kullugin; Anon Rodprasert; Wanchana Kasemsunt; Chanchit Supadilokluk; Pongkeat Pivekumt; Jantaphong Tengsakul; Kim Aarola; Jason Cotsmire; Prakpoom Thongaram; Chanchieo Supadilokluk; Likit Neimwan; Kittiphat Ongvisagepaiboon; Vorravith Maklamthong	Khaled Al-Suwaidi; Theyab Al-Subousi; Mohammed Al-Shamsi; Khaled Al-Habsi; Juma Al-Dhaheri; Mohamed Al-Jachi; Omar Al-Shamsi; Ahmed Al-Mazrouei; Faisal Al-Baloushi; Ali Al-Sarour; Salem Al-Darmaki; Obaid Al-Muharami; Saeed Al-Nuaimi; Mohamed Al-Zaabi; Faisal Al-Suwaidi; Mubarak Al-Mazrouei; Ebraheem Budebs; Turki Al-Shamsi; Ali Al-Mazrouei; Ahmed Al-Dhaheri; Suhail Al-Mheiri; Ali Al-Haddad; Saif Al-Ketbi

== Results ==
All times are Almaty Time (UTC+06:00)

=== Premier division ===
Pos	Team	Pld	W	OW	OL	L	GF	GA	GD	Pts
1	Kyrgyzstan	6	6	0	0	0	95	23	+72	18
2	Thailand	6	5	0	0	1	70	22	+48	15
3	United Arab Emirates	6	4	0	0	2	48	27	+21	12
4	Mongolia	6	3	0	0	3	35	37	−2	9
5	Malaysia	6	2	0	0	4	46	59	−13	6
6	Athletes from Kuwait	6	1	0	0	5	41	40	+1	3
7	Bahrain	6	0	0	0	6	11	138	−127	0

Source: IIHF

28 January; 13:30	Thailand	4–15 (2–8, 1–2, 1–5)	Kyrgyzstan	Kazakhstan Sports Palace 2, Astana; Attendance: 350

Game reference

Pongsak Phiewklam
Jason Cotsmire
Goalies
Sergey Ossintsev
Referee:
Choi Yoon-young (KOR)

	0–1	06:05 – Fitisenko (Zhuravlyov)
	0–2	06:18 – Shiderinov (Falfudinov, Kolobov)
	0–3	07:15 – Shiderinov (Falfudinov, Kolobov)
	0–4	07:50 – Sazonov (V. Sorokin, Kudayarov)
	0–5	11:09 – Kolobov (SH)
	0–6	13:17 – Kolobov (Zhuravlyov, Falfudinov) (PP)
Thamwongsin (Rodprasert) (SH) – 15:06	1–6
	1–7	16:17 – Kryukov (PP)
Rattanachot (Chanchit Supadilokluk) – 19:34	2–7
	2–8	19:51 – Sazonov (Zhuravlyov)
	2–9	24:52 – Kryukov
	2–10	35:55 – Shiderinov (Kryukov)
Neimwan (Chanchie. Supadilokluk, Rattanachot) – 37:56	3–10
	3–11	45:02 – Kolobov (Falfudinov, Fillippov)
	3–12	49:21 – Alexeyev (Kudayarov, Zhuravlyov)
	3–13	54:32 – Kryukov (Falfudinov, Shiderinov)
	3–14	57:38 – Falfudinov (Shiderinov, Kryukov)
	3–15	59:42 – Shiderinov (Kolobov, Fillippov)
Thamwongsin (Chanchit Supadilokluk) – 59:59	4–15

6 min
Penalties
8 min
27
Shots
56

28 January; 17:00	Malaysia	25–0 (4–0, 8–0, 13–0)	Bahrain	Kazakhstan Sports Palace 2, Astana; Attendance: 300

Game reference

Tengku Azlly
Goalies
Abdulla Al-Adhab
Mohamed Al-Doy
Referee:
Kimikazu Koizumi (JPN)

Loke (David) – 10:11	1–0
David (Loke) (PP) – 12:03	2–0
Loke – 12:58	3–0
Khoo (Moi) – 17:58	4–0
Loke – 20:06	5–0
Moi (Khoo) (PP) – 24:32	6–0
Tan K.P. (Loke, Yahaya) – 30:50	7–0
Moi (Khoo) – 31:31	8–0
Tan K.S. (Moi, Chee) (PP) – 34:01	9–0
David (Loke) – 35:22	10–0
Tan K.P. (Loke) – 35:30	11–0
Loke (David) (SH) – 38:31	12–0
Yeoh (Ong) – 41:55	13–0
Chee (Khoo) – 43:32	14–0
Tan K.P. (Loke) – 49:28	15–0
Loke – 49:46	16–0
Loke (Tan K.P., Yap) – 52:08	17–0
Chee – 52:26	18–0
Tan K.P. (Loke, Yahaya) – 53:47	19–0
Chee – 55:13	20–0
David (Loke) – 56:40	21–0
Chee (Mahmood) – 57:41	22–0
B. Tan (Yap) – 58:01	23–0
Tan K.P. (Yahaya, Loke) (PP) – 59:43	24–0
Loke – 59:56	25–0

8 min
Penalties
14 min
72
Shots
8

28 January; 20:30	Mongolia	3–2 (1–0, 0–0, 2–2)	Athletes from Kuwait	Kazakhstan Sports Palace 2, Astana; Attendance: 200

Game reference

Bazarvaany Baatarkhüü
Goalies
Jasem Al-Sarraf
Referee:
Liu Wubin (CHN)

Mishigsüren (Batzayaa) – 11:20	1–0
Batzayaa – 40:58	2–0
	2–1	46:11 – S. Al-Ajmi (A. Al-Ajmi)
Mishigsüren (PS) – 48:21	3–1
	3–2	54:26 – Me. Al-Ajmi (Mo. Al-Ajmi)

8 min
Penalties
10 min
17
Shots
28

29 January; 13:30	United Arab Emirates	0–14 (0–3, 0–6, 0–5)	Kyrgyzstan	Kazakhstan Sports Palace 2, Astana; Attendance: 200

Game reference

Ahmed Al-Dhaheri
Khaled Al-Suwaidi
Goalies
Sergey Ossintsev
Referee:
Nikita Zalipyatskikh (KAZ)

0–1	06:37 – Kolobov (Shiderinov, Fillippov) (PP)
0–2	17:26 – Kryukov (Kolobov, Falfudinov) (PP)
0–3	19:05 – Zhuravlyov (Fillippov)
0–4	22:24 – Kabanov (S. Sorokin, Zhuravlyov)
0–5	33:26 – Kryukov (Ossintsev, Kabanov)
0–6	34:04 – Falfudinov (Kolobov, Kryukov)
0–7	35:21 – Zhuravlyov (Sazonov, Kabanov)
0–8	37:09 – Kabanov (Zhuravlyov) (SH)
0–9	37:25 – Kolobov (Alexeyev) (SH)
0–10	41:36 – S. Sorokin (Zhuravlyov, V. Sorokin)
0–11	42:27 – Kryukov (PS)
0–12	43:22 – Shiderinov (Kryukov, Kolobov)
0–13	48:01 – Kolobov (Fillippov) (PP2)
0–14	53:43 – Zhuravlyov (S. Sorokin) (SH)

40 min
Penalties
18 min
21
Shots
70

29 January; 17:00	Bahrain	0–29 (0–11, 0–10, 0–8)	Thailand	Kazakhstan Sports Palace 2, Astana; Attendance: 200

Game reference

Abdulla Al-Adhab
Goalies
Jason Cotsmire
Referee:
Keith Fong (CAN)

0–1	03:00 – Aarola (Thamwongsin)
0–2	03:52 – Neimwan (Chartsuwan)
0–3	05:20 – Jirachai (Tengsakul)
0–4	07:03 – Thongaram (Neimwan) (PP)
0–5	09:01 – Jirachai (Tengsakul)
0–6	09:45 – Pivekumt (Aarola) (PP2)
0–7	10:10 – Aarola (Pivekumt) (PP)
0–8	10:34 – Thammasit (Thongaram) (PP)
0–9	11:51 – Rattanachot (Chanchit Supadilokluk, Chartsuwan) (PP)
0–10	12:20 – Rattanachot (Neimwan, Chartsuwan) (PP)
0–11	19:06 – Kullugin (Aarola, Pivekumt)
0–12	20:14 – Chartsuwan (Neimwan) (SH)
0–13	23:15 – Aarola (Pivekumt)
0–14	24:56 – Chartsuwan
0–15	27:26 – Thamwongsin (Pivekumt, Kullugin)
0–16	29:07 – Rattanachot (Chartsuwan) (PP)
0–17	30:18 – Tengsakul (Thammasit)
0–18	30:29 – Kasemsunt (Thammasit)
0–19	30:38 – Aarola (Thamwongsin)
0–20	31:12 – Aarola (Thamwongsin)
0–21	35:12 – Thamwongsin (Kullugin)
0–22	42:45 – Pivekumt (Harnnarujchai, Thamwongsin) (PP)
0–23	50:00 – Rattanachot (Chanchie. Supadilokluk)
0–24	50:14 – Chartsuwan (Rattanachot)
0–25	53:02 – Thamwongsin (Pivekumt, Aarola)
0–26	54:09 – Thammasit (Jittranont)
0–27	56:02 – Rattanachot (Neimwan)
0–28	58:11 – Aarola
0–29	59:21 – Chartsuwan (Chanchie. Supadilokluk, Neimwan)

39 min
Penalties
4 min
2
Shots
70

29 January; 20:30	Athletes from Kuwait	7–12 (1–5, 2–4, 4–3)	Malaysia	Kazakhstan Sports Palace 2, Astana; Attendance: 200

Game reference

Jasem Al-Sarraf
Jasem Dashti
Goalies
Tengku Azlly
Referee:
Andrey Sachuk (KAZ)

	0–1	00:24 – Loke
	0–2	00:58 – Tan K.S. (Khoo)
	0–3	03:32 – Yahaya (Tan K.P.) (PP2)
	0–4	09:43 – Loke (Tan K.P.) (PP)
	0–5	13:41 – Tan K.P. (Ong) (PP)
A. Al-Ajmi (Atallah, Y. Al-Kandari) – 15:32	1–5
	1–6	24:07 – Tan K.S. (Chee, Yeoh)
	1–7	25:43 – Chee
	1–8	33:00 – Tan K.S. (Isa)
	1–9	34:11 – Loke
A. Al-Ajmi (A. Al-Maragi) – 34:56	2–9
Mo. Al-Ajmi (Atallah) – 37:05	3–9
Shetail (A. Al-Ajmi) – 41:56	4–9
Mo. Al-Ajmi (PP) – 43:14	5–9
A. Al-Maragi (Me. Al-Ajmi) – 44:43	6–9
	6–10	46:38 – Loke
	6–11	50:51 – Loke (SH)
	6–12	54:19 – Tan K.P. (Loke) (PP)
A. Al-Ajmi (Mo. Al-Ajmi) (PP) – 55:10	7–12

32 min
Penalties
22 min
30
Shots
41

31 January; 13:30	United Arab Emirates	25–0 (9–0, 6–0, 10–0)	Bahrain	Kazakhstan Sports Palace 2, Astana; Attendance: 200

Game reference

Ahmed Al-Dhaheri
Khaled Al-Suwaidi
Goalies
Abdulla Al-Adhab
Referee:
Kimikazu Koizumi (JPN)

J. Al-Dhaheri – 00:06	1–0
J. Al-Dhaheri (Al-Darmaki) – 01:04	2–0
Al-Nuaimi (Al-Jachi) (SH) – 07:35	3–0
Al-Mheiri (M. Al-Shamsi) (SH) – 07:48	4–0
Al. Al-Mazrouei (J. Al-Dhaheri, Al-Darmaki) – 08:55	5–0
M. Al-Shamsi (Al-Jachi) – 11:33	6–0
J. Al-Dhaheri (Al-Mheiri) (SH) – 15:39	7–0
Al-Darmaki (Al. Al-Mazrouei, J. Al-Dhaheri) – 17:44	8–0
Al-Mheiri (Al-Jachi, O. Al-Shamsi) (PP) – 19:13	9–0
Al-Nuaimi (F. Al-Suwaidi) – 22:18	10–0
M. Al-Mazrouei (Al-Nuaimi) – 29:02	11–0
Al-Baloushi (M. Al-Shamsi, Al-Sarour) – 30:55	12–0
Al-Sarour (M. Al-Shamsi) – 33:54	13–0
M. Al-Shamsi (Al-Baloushi, Al-Sarour) (PP) – 35:58	14–0
Al-Subousi – 37:21	15–0
Al-Baloushi (Al. Al-Mazrouei) – 42:24	16–0
Al-Nuaimi (M. Al-Shamsi) – 44:36	17–0
O. Al-Shamsi (J. Al-Dhaheri) – 47:54	18–0
Al. Al-Mazrouei (J. Al-Dhaheri) – 48:15	19–0
Al-Nuaimi – 48:52	20–0
Al-Nuaimi (O. Al-Shamsi, Al-Mheiri) – 50:07	21–0
Al-Darmaki (Budebs, Al. Al-Mazrouei) – 51:59	22–0
Al-Nuaimi (J. Al-Dhaheri) – 53:43	23–0
O. Al-Shamsi (SH) – 59:02	24–0
J. Al-Dhaheri (Al-Nuaimi) – 59:49	25–0

8 min
Penalties
16 min
66
Shots
3

31 January; 17:00	Mongolia	3–13 (1–5, 0–6, 2–2)	Kyrgyzstan	Kazakhstan Sports Palace 2, Astana; Attendance: 150

Game reference

Batsükhiin Battör
Bazarvaany Baatarkhüü
Goalies
Sergey Ossintsev
Zhirgalbek Bakirov
Referee:
Liu Wubin (CHN)

	0–1	01:04 – Kolobov (Shiderinov)
	0–2	07:10 – Esen Uulu (V. Sorokin)
	0–3	14:09 – Kolobov (Fillippov)
Mönkhzayaa (Pürev-Ochir) – 16:21	1–3
	1–4	17:30 – V. Sorokin (Kudayarov) (PP)
	1–5	18:05 – Zhuravlyov (Alexeyev, Kabanov)
	1–6	24:45 – Kudayarov (Tokoev, V. Sorokin)
	1–7	25:34 – Omorkanov (S. Sorokin, Kabanov)
	1–8	25:50 – Shiderinov (Fillippov)
	1–9	30:33 – Kryukov (Kolobov, Fillippov) (PP)
	1–10	36:41 – Shiderinov (Fillippov)
	1–11	39:34 – Zhuravlyov (S. Sorokin, Kabanov) (PP)
	1–12	42:19 – Kolobov (Kryukov)
	1–13	44:06 – S. Sorokin (V. Sorokin) (PP)
Batzayaa (SH) – 50:13	2–13
Batzayaa (EN) – 59:42	3–13

14 min
Penalties
4 min
17
Shots
45

31 January; 20:30	Thailand	5–3 (2–0, 0–2, 3–1)	Athletes from Kuwait	Kazakhstan Sports Palace 2, Astana; Attendance: 100

Game reference

Pongsak Phiewklam
Jason Cotsmire
Goalies
Jasem Al-Sarraf
Referee:
Choi Yoon-young (KOR)

Thamwongsin – 01:55	1–0
Tengsakul (Jittranont) – 10:23	2–0
	2–1	27:01 – Me. Al-Ajmi (A. Al-Ajmi) (SH)
	2–2	39:18 – Mo. Al-Ajmi (A. Al-Maragi)
Neimwan (Rattanachot) (PP) – 53:04	3–2
	3–3	57:42 – A. Al-Maragi (Shetail) (PP)
Neimwan (Chartsuwan) – 58:16	4–3
Neimwan (PS) – 59:19	5–3

35 min
Penalties
14 min
47
Shots
26

1 February; 13:30	Kyrgyzstan	23–2 (11–0, 8–1, 4–1)	Malaysia	Kazakhstan Sports Palace 2, Astana; Attendance: 200

Game reference

Sergey Ossintsev
Zhirgalbek Bakirov
Goalies
Abdul Hakim Ismail
Tengku Azlly
Referee:
Keith Fong (CAN)

Kabanov (Zhuravlyov) – 01:28	1–0
Kabanov (Zhuravlyov) – 01:47	2–0
Falfudinov (Shiderinov, Kolobov) – 02:58	3–0
Kabanov (Zhuravlyov, S. Sorokin) – 03:15	4–0
Sazonov (Sheishenaliev) – 04:46	5–0
Kryukov (Kolobov, Falfudinov) – 06:09	6–0
Omorkanov (Zhuravlyov, Kabanov) – 06:44	7–0
Shiderinov (Kolobov) – 09:04	8–0
Omorkanov (Falfudinov) – 09:27	9–0
Kabanov (V. Sorokin) – 13:23	10–0
Kryukov (Shiderinov, Kolobov) – 18:03	11–0
Omorkanov (Zhuravlyov, Kabanov) – 22:16	12–0
Fillippov (Kryukov, Kolobov) – 25:31	13–0
Kabanov (Zhuravlyov) – 25:51	14–0
	14–1	27:45 – Chang (B. Tan)
Tynaliev (Kolobov, Shiderinov) – 29:04	15–1
Tynaliev (Shiderinov, Kolobov) – 33:08	16–1
Kabanov (Bakirov, V. Sorokin) – 35:39	17–1
Fillippov (Kryukov, Tynaliev) – 37:43	18–1
S. Sorokin (Zhuravlyov, V. Sorokin) – 39:17	19–1
Tynaliev (Shiderinov, Kolobov) – 41:25	20–1
	20–2	46:33 – Tan K.S. (Yeoh)
V. Sorokin (Omorkanov, Kabanov) – 47:30	21–2
Omorkanov (Zhuravlyov, Kabanov) – 52:04	22–2
Esen Uulu (Askarbekov, Kudayarov) – 53:12	23–2

2 min
Penalties
2 min
61
Shots
13

1 February; 17:00	Bahrain	1–21 (1–4, 0–8, 0–9)	Mongolia	Kazakhstan Sports Palace 2, Astana; Attendance: 100

Game reference

Abdulla Al-Adhab
Goalies
Bazarvaany Baatarkhüü
Batsükhiin Battör
Referee:
Nikita Zalipyatskikh (KAZ)

	0–1	03:26 – Od-Erdene (SH)
	0–2	07:00 – Chuluunzorig (Mönkhzayaa, Pürev-Ochir)
	0–3	11:07 – Mishigsüren (Altanbayar) (PP)
	0–4	13:33 – Pürev-Ochir (Mönkhzayaa)
Fakhroo (PP2) – 17:34	1–4
	1–5	21:19 – Batzayaa (Mishigsüren)
	1–6	22:02 – Bayarjargal (Zolboo, Bolor-Erdene)
	1–7	24:01 – Tserenbaljir (Batzayaa, Mishigsüren) (PP)
	1–8	24:14 – Mishigsüren (Batzayaa, Tserenbaljir)
	1–9	24:34 – Bayarjargal (Zolboo, Bolor-Erdene)
	1–10	28:22 – Mishigsüren (Batzayaa) (PP)
	1–11	31:24 – Pürev-Ochir
	1–12	35:56 – Mönkhzayaa
	1–13	40:40 – Mishigsüren (Batzayaa, Tserenbaljir) (PP)
	1–14	42:17 – Bolor-Erdene (Erkhbayar) (PP)
	1–15	43:34 – Batzayaa (Od-Erdene)
	1–16	45:29 – Zolboo (Erkhbayar)
	1–17	51:21 – Tserenbaljir (Batzayaa)
	1–18	53:44 – Zolboo (SH)
	1–19	54:47 – Mishigsüren (Batzayaa) (PP)
	1–20	58:39 – Od-Erdene
	1–21	59:40 – Batzayaa

18 min
Penalties
12 min
11
Shots
68

1 February; 20:30	Athletes from Kuwait	2–5 (0–2, 1–1, 1–2)	United Arab Emirates	Kazakhstan Sports Palace 2, Astana; Attendance: 200

Game reference

Jasem Al-Sarraf
Goalies
Ahmed Al-Dhaheri
Referee:
Andrey Sachuk (KAZ)

	0–1	10:11 – Al-Baloushi (Budebs) (PP)
	0–2	12:23 – Al-Mheiri (Al-Jachi, O. Al-Shamsi)
	0–3	24:33 – Al. Al-Mazrouei (J. Al-Dhaheri)
Shetail – 32:27	1–3
	1–4	42:02 – J. Al-Dhaheri
	1–5	52:45 – Al-Haddad (O. Al-Shamsi) (PP)
Mo. Al-Ajmi (PP) – 59:35	2–5

12 min
Penalties
12 min
16
Shots
27

2 February; 13:30	Bahrain	10–15 (2–6, 6–4, 2–5)	Kyrgyzstan	Kazakhstan Sports Palace 2, Astana; Attendance: 150

Game reference

Abdulla Al-Adhab
Mohamed Al-Doy
Goalies
Sergey Ossintsev
Zhirgalbek Bakirov
Referee:
Choi Yoon-young (KOR)

	0–1	02:11 – Kolobov (Kryukov)
	0–2	03:54 – Askarbekov (Sazonov)
	0–3	05:55 – Toktaliev (Zhuravlyov, Kabanov)
	0–4	11:03 – Toktaliev
	0–5	11:17 – Sheishenaliev (Shiderinov, Fillippov)
	0–6	11:37 – Sheishenaliev (Shiderinov, Kolobov)
Al-Mutlaq (Hegazi, Ahmed) – 17:41	1–6
Al-Mushiqeri (Abdull. Turki, Al-Thawadi) – 19:26	2–6
Ahmed (Hegazi) – 23:05	3–6
Baqer (Al-Jawder) – 24:07	4–6
Ismaeel – 24:24	5–6
Abdull. Turki – 25:41	6–6
	6–7	26:22 – Kolobov (Kryukov)
Al-Jawder (Ismaeel) – 27:20	7–7
	7–8	28:41 – Fitisenko
	7–9	30:24 – Sheishenaliev (Kryukov, Kolobov)
Ahmed – 33:55	8–9
	8–10	34:04 – Tokoev
	8–11	41:21 – Toktaliev (Zhuravlyov, Kabanov)
	8–12	42:00 – Fillippov (Kryukov)
	8–13	57:47 – Toktaliev (Zhuravlyov, Kabanov)
	8–14	58:52 – Askarbekov (Kryukov, Kolobov)
	8–15	59:07 – Esen Uulu (Zhuravlyov)
Al-Mushiqeri (Al-Thawadi) (EN) – 59:27	9–15
Ahmed (EN) – 59:44	10–15

0 min
Penalties
2 min
24
Shots
42

2 February; 17:00	United Arab Emirates	9–1 (0–0, 6–1, 3–0)	Mongolia	Kazakhstan Sports Palace 2, Astana; Attendance: 300

Game reference

Ahmed Al-Dhaheri
Goalies
Batsükhiin Battör
Bazarvaany Baatarkhüü
Referee:
Kimikazu Koizumi (JPN)

J. Al-Dhaheri – 24:55	1–0
	1–1	26:58 – Pürev-Ochir (Batzayaa) (PP)
Al-Haddad (J. Al-Dhaheri) – 29:14	2–1
J. Al-Dhaheri (Al-Mheiri) – 29:24	3–1
Al-Haddad (M. Al-Shamsi, J. Al-Dhaheri) – 32:01	4–1
J. Al-Dhaheri (Al-Haddad) (PP) – 34:04	5–1
O. Al-Shamsi (J. Al-Dhaheri) – 39:37	6–1
Al. Al-Mazrouei (J. Al-Dhaheri) – 41:36	7–1
Al-Jachi (J. Al-Dhaheri) (SH) – 44:51	8–1
Al. Al-Mazrouei (Al-Jachi) – 53:32	9–1

20 min
Penalties
18 min
38
Shots
10

2 February; 20:30	Thailand	16–1 (7–0, 7–0, 2–1)	Malaysia	Kazakhstan Sports Palace 2, Astana; Attendance: 300

Game reference

Jason Cotsmire
Goalies
Tengku Azlly
Abdul Hakim Ismail
Referee:
Liu Wubin (CHN)

Chanchit Supadilokluk (Chartsuwan) (PP) – 02:09	1–0
Chartsuwan (Neimwan) – 05:33	2–0
Rattanachot (Aarola) (PP) – 10:09	3–0
Chartsuwan (Aarola) (PP) – 11:29	4–0
Aarola – 13:24	5–0
Chartsuwan (Aarola) – 16:43	6–0
Aarola (Rattanachot) (SH) – 18:56	7–0
Thamwongsin (Tengsakul) – 27:47	8–0
Aarola (Rattanachot) – 30:20	9–0
Chartsuwan (Rattanachot) – 30:35	10–0
Chartsuwan (Aarola, Neimwan) – 34:53	11–0
Aarola (Chartsuwan, Rattanachot) – 35:47	12–0
Kullugin (Tengsakul) – 36:10	13–0
Harnnarujchai (Pivekumt) – 38:16	14–0
	14–1	48:50 – Yap (David)
Neimwan (Rodprasert) – 53:14	15–1
Jittranont – 56:25	16–1

8 min
Penalties
24 min
55
Shots
15

4 February; 13:30	Kyrgyzstan	15–4 (5–3, 4–0, 6–1)	Athletes from Kuwait	Kazakhstan Sports Palace 2, Astana; Attendance: 200

Game reference

Zhirgalbek Bakirov
Sergey Ossintsev
Goalies
Jasem Al-Sarraf
Referee:
Nikita Zalipyatskikh (KAZ)

Kryukov (Kolobov) – 00:26	1–0
Esen Uulu (Zhuravlyov, Kabanov) – 01:17	2–0
Esen Uulu (Zhuravlyov, Kabanov) – 05:09	3–0
Kolobov (Shiderinov) – 08:10	4–0
	4–1	09:23 – Mo. Al-Ajmi (A. Al-Ajmi, Me. Al-Ajmi)
Kryukov (Kolobov) – 11:47	5–1
	5–2	13:18 – Mo. Al-Ajmi (A. Al-Ajmi)
	5–3	13:41 – S. Al-Ajmi
Sheishenaliev (Shiderinov, Kolobov) – 25:55	6–3
Kryukov (Kolobov) – 28:37	7–3
Falfudinov (Kryukov, Kolobov) – 35:32	8–3
Fillippov (Kryukov, Kabanov) (PP) – 39:20	9–3
Kolobov (Kryukov) – 40:46	10–3
Zhuravlyov (Kabanov) – 41:32	11–3
Omorkanov (Zhuravlyov, Kabanov) – 45:35	12–3
	12–4	52:44 – A. Al-Maragi (Me. Al-Ajmi, Shetail) (SH)
Kryukov (Shiderinov, Fillippov) (PP) – 56:18	13–4
Zhuravlyov (Kabanov) (PP) – 57:24	14–4
Sazonov (S. Sorokin, Kudayarov) – 59:54	15–4

18 min
Penalties
18 min
54
Shots
17

4 February; 17:00	Mongolia	1–7 (1–1, 0–4, 0–2)	Thailand	Kazakhstan Sports Palace 2, Astana; Attendance: 100

Game reference

Bazarvaany Baatarkhüü
Goalies
Pongsak Phiewklam
Referee:
Andrey Sachuk (KAZ)

	0–1	01:04 – Kasemsunt (Chartsuwan)
Bayarjargal (Bolor-Erdene) – 13:53	1–1
	1–2	27:12 – Neimwan (Chartsuwan)
	1–3	32:35 – Neimwan (Chartsuwan)
	1–4	35:01 – Chartsuwan (Aarola, Neimwan)
	1–5	35:59 – Aarola (Chartsuwan) (PP)
	1–6	41:15 – Thamwongsin (Kullugin, Tengsakul)
	1–7	43:20 – Ongvisagepaiboon (SH)

10 min
Penalties
12 min
19
Shots
42

4 February; 20:30	Malaysia	1–7 (0–1, 1–2, 0–4)	United Arab Emirates	Kazakhstan Sports Palace 2, Astana; Attendance: 200

Game reference

Tengku Azlly
Goalies
Ahmed Al-Dhaheri
Referee:
Keith Fong (CAN)

	0–1	14:22 – J. Al-Dhaheri (Al-Jachi, O. Al-Shamsi)
	0–2	24:55 – Al-Mheiri (SH)
	0–3	31:32 – O. Al-Shamsi (Al-Subousi)
David (Yap, Loke) (PP) – 38:01	1–3
	1–4	44:19 – Al. Al-Mazrouei (Al-Jachi) (PP2)
	1–5	48:57 – Budebs (J. Al-Dhaheri) (PP)
	1–6	50:22 – Al-Nuaimi (Al-Muharami)
	1–7	58:46 – O. Al-Shamsi

16 min
Penalties
22 min
14
Shots
44

5 February; 13:30	Athletes from Kuwait	23–0 (6–0, 7–0, 10–0)	Bahrain	Kazakhstan Sports Palace 2, Astana; Attendance: 300

Game reference

Jasem Al-Sarraf
Jasem Dashti
Goalies
Abdulla Al-Adhab
Referee:
Keith Fong (CAN)

A. Al-Ajmi (Me. Al-Ajmi) – 03:00	1–0
A. Al-Ajmi (A. Al-Maragi, Al-Awadhi) – 05:00	2–0
Al-Henaidi (Atallah, S. Al-Ajmi) – 08:04	3–0
Me. Al-Ajmi (A. Al-Maragi, A. Al-Ajmi) – 16:15	4–0
M. Al-Maragi (S. Al-Ajmi) – 17:55	5–0
Me. Al-Ajmi – 18:10	6–0
Shetail (Me. Al-Ajmi) – 23:14	7–0
Me. Al-Ajmi (S. Al-Ajmi) (PP2) – 25:13	8–0
S. Al-Ajmi (M. Al-Maragi, Y. Al-Kandari) (PP) – 30:59	9–0
A. Al-Maragi (Me. Al-Ajmi, Shetail) – 32:05	10–0
A. Al-Maragi (Me. Al-Ajmi) (SH) – 32:55	11–0
S. Al-Ajmi (Y. Al-Kandari) – 39:01	12–0
Me. Al-Ajmi (A. Al-Maragi, Shetail) – 39:22	13–0
Shetail (Me. Al-Ajmi) (PP) – 40:29	14–0
Y. Al-Kandari (S. Al-Ajmi) – 43:16	15–0
Me. Al-Ajmi (PP) – 46:20	16–0
S. Al-Ajmi (Al-Awadhi, Y. Al-Kandari) – 48:48	17–0
A. Al-Maragi (PP) – 49:27	18–0
A. Al-Maragi (Me. Al-Ajmi) (PP) – 50:15	19–0
Me. Al-Ajmi (Shetail) – 51:08	20–0
Me. Al-Ajmi (PP) – 53:34	21–0
Y. Al-Kandari (Me. Al-Ajmi, S. Al-Ajmi) – 56:37	22–0
A. Al-Maragi (Shetail) (SH) – 57:23	23–0

14 min
Penalties
20 min
103
Shots
1

5 February; 17:00	Malaysia	5–6 (1–1, 4–3, 0–2)	Mongolia	Kazakhstan Sports Palace 2, Astana; Attendance: 200

Game reference

Tengku Azlly
Goalies
Batsükhiin Battör
Referee:
Choi Yoon-young (KOR)

David (Chee, Tan K.P.) – 07:52	1–0
	1–1	08:32 – Batzayaa (Mishigsüren)
Loke – 20:55	2–1
	2–2	26:46 – Erdenebat (Zolboo, Bolor-Erdene)
Loke (David) – 27:27	3–2
	3–3	35:07 – Batzayaa (Mishigsüren)
Tan K.P. (SH) – 36:16	4–3
David (Loke, Tan K.P.) (PP) – 39:00	5–3
	5–4	39:41 – Pürev-Ochir (Mishigsüren)
	5–5	45:47 – Chuluunzorig (Batgerel)
	5–6	47:57 – Batzayaa

8 min
Penalties
12 min
30
Shots
34

5 February; 20:30	United Arab Emirates	2–9 (0–1, 2–5, 0–3)	Thailand	Kazakhstan Sports Palace 2, Astana; Attendance: 300

Game reference

Ahmed Al-Dhaheri
Khaled Al-Suwaidi
Goalies
Jason Cotsmire
Referee:
Andrey Sachuk (KAZ)

	0–1	13:27 – Chartsuwan (PS)
Al. Al-Mazrouei (J. Al-Dhaheri) – 24:01	1–1
	1–2	24:34 – Chartsuwan (Aarola)
Al-Darmaki (Al-Nuaimi, T. Al-Shamsi) – 25:11	2–2
	2–3	25:45 – Chartsuwan (Aarola)
	2–4	26:29 – Chartsuwan (Aarola)
	2–5	33:38 – Aarola (Chanchit Supadilokluk)
	2–6	38:21 – Kasemsunt (Aarola) (PP)
	2–7	44:06 – Rattanachot (Aarola, Neimwan)
	2–8	48:38 – Tengsakul (Thamwongsin)
	2–9	57:41 – Rattanachot (Ongvisagepaiboon)

18 min
Penalties
12 min
18
Shots
31

=== Top division ===
Pos	Team	Pld	W	OW	OL	L	GF	GA	GD	Pts
1	Kazakhstan	4	4	0	0	0	62	3	+59	12
2	Japan	4	3	0	0	1	32	6	+26	9
3	South Korea	4	2	0	0	2	35	16	+19	6
4	China	4	1	0	0	3	13	33	−20	3
5	Chinese Taipei	4	0	0	0	4	1	85	−84	0

Source: IIHF

31 January; 14:30	Chinese Taipei	0–22 (0–6, 0–10, 0–6)	South Korea	Kazakhstan Sports Palace 1, Astana; Attendance: 450

Game reference

Ting Pang-keng
Lin Tsung-han
Goalies
Eum Hyun-seung
Park Sung-je
Referees:
Juraj Konc (SVK)
Derek Zalaski (CAN)

0–1	01:19 – Kim Won-J. (Kim G., Cho)
0–2	03:34 – Kim K.H. (Cho, Ahn)
0–3	11:31 – Song (Kwon, Kim S.)
0–4	15:43 – Lee Y. (Park W., Kim Woo-J.)
0–5	18:30 – Choi (Suh, Shin)
0–6	19:29 – Cho (Kim D.)
0–7	22:43 – Cho (Kim G., Kim Won-J.)
0–8	22:55 – Kim Y. (Kim Won-J.)
0–9	23:56 – Song (Kim S., Kwon)
0–10	30:27 – Kim G. (Choi, Shin)
0–11	33:40 – Suh (Shin)
0–12	34:49 – Kim K.S. (Kim D.)
0–13	35:22 – Kim K.S. (Lee Y., Park W.)
0–14	36:58 – Kim Won-J. (Ahn, Kim Y.)
0–15	37:39 – Ahn (Kim Y.)
0–16	38:30 – Park W. (Kim Woo-J., Lee Y.)
0–17	44:11 – Suh (Shin, Kim Y.)
0–18	46:43 – Park W. (Kim K.S., Kim Woo-J.)
0–19	49:36 – Cho (PP)
0–20	49:52 – Shin (Choi)
0–21	56:02 – Kim K.S. (Kim H.S.) (SH)
0–22	57:55 – Kim K.H. (Park W.)

4 min
Penalties
4 min
7
Shots
81

31 January; 19:00	China	1–7 (0–3, 0–2, 1–2)	Japan	Kazakhstan Sports Palace 1, Astana; Attendance: 1,100

Game reference

Liu Zhiwei
Goalies
Yutaka Fukufuji
Referees:
Sergey Kulakov (RUS)
Roman Polak (CZE)

	0–1	08:15 – Kuji (Kon, Haga)
	0–2	11:40 – Kuji (Yamashita)
	0–3	14:51 – Kuji (Kon, Domeki) (PP)
	0–4	26:41 – Saito (Tanaka)
	0–5	35:03 – Tanaka (T. Suzuki, Osawa) (PP)
	0–6	51:03 – Tanaka (Ishioka, Tonosaki) (PP)
Wang D. (Qu) – 54:09	1–6
	1–7	59:21 – Haga (SH, EN)

22 min
Penalties
12 min
13
Shots
63

1 February; 14:30	Japan	18–0 (4–0, 5–0, 9–0)	Chinese Taipei	Kazakhstan Sports Palace 1, Astana; Attendance: 950

Game reference

Masahito Haruna
Goalies
Ting Pang-keng
Lin Tsung-han
Referees:
Sergey Kulakov (RUS)
Aleksi Rantala (FIN)

Tonosaki (Nishiwaki, Ogawa) – 01:38	1–0
Domeki (Keller) – 06:09	2–0
Domeki – 15:41	3–0
Ishioka (Kawai, M. Suzuki) – 19:41	4–0
Kawashima (M. Suzuki) – 21:21	5–0
Osawa (Haga, Ueno) – 21:58	6–0
Saito (T. Suzuki, Osawa) (PP) – 30:43	7–0
Osawa (Tonosaki, Tanaka) (SH) – 35:50	8–0
Tanaka – 39:18	9–0
Haga (Yanadori, Tanaka) – 40:25	10–0
Yamashita (Kuji) – 40:40	11–0
Kuji (Keller) – 41:16	12–0
Haga (Tanaka) (PP) – 42:47	13–0
Ueno (Tanaka, Nishiwaki) – 42:59	14–0
M. Suzuki (Saito, Tonosaki) – 50:14	15–0
Saito (Tanaka) – 56:07	16–0
Ueno (PP) – 56:30	17–0
Tanaka (Yanadori) – 58:29	18–0

8 min
Penalties
14 min
108
Shots
5

1 February; 19:00	Kazakhstan	14–1 (4–0, 3–0, 7–1)	China	Kazakhstan Sports Palace 1, Astana; Attendance: 5,500

Game reference

Vitaliy Yeremeyev
Ivan Poloshkov
Goalies
Liu Zhiwei
Referees:
Juraj Konc (SVK)
Derek Zalaski (CAN)

Krasnoslobodtsev (Zhailauov) – 03:19	1–0
Starchenko (Rymarev, Khudyakov) – 06:44	2–0
Rymarev (Starchenko, Khudyakov) – 08:39	3–0
Vassilchenko (Polishchuk) – 18:55	4–0
Starchenko (Savchenko) – 33:40	5–0
Fadeyev (Krasnoslobodtsev) – 35:44	6–0
Litvinenko (Polishchuk, Bumagin) – 37:56	7–0
Rymarev (Starchenko, Khudyakov) – 43:32	8–0
Solarev (Polishchuk) – 44:19	9–0
	9–1	47:30 – Wang D. (Wang C.)
Zhailauov (Novopashin) – 48:31	10–1
Starchenko (Savchenko, Poloshkov) – 48:45	11–1
Gavrilin (Krasnoslobodtsev, Zhailauov) – 50:18	12–1
Litvinenko (Zhailauov) – 52:57	13–1
Fadeyev (Starchenko, Rymarev) (PP) – 58:49	14–1

2 min
Penalties
8 min
74
Shots
11

3 February; 14:30	Japan	6–1 (0–1, 5–0, 1–0)	South Korea	Kazakhstan Sports Palace 1, Astana; Attendance: 2,700

Game reference

Yutaka Fukufuji
Goalies
Eum Hyun-seung
Park Sung-je
Referees:
Juraj Konc (SVK)
Roman Polak (CZE)

	0–1	12:09 – Cho (Kim D.) (PP)
Domeki (Keller, Kuji) (PP2) – 21:50	1–1
T. Suzuki (Tanaka, Osawa) (PP2) – 25:20	2–1
Tanaka (T. Suzuki) (SH) – 32:11	3–1
Osawa (Tanaka, T. Suzuki) (PP) – 35:17	4–1
Yamashita (Keller, Domeki) (PP) – 36:01	5–1
Ueno (Nishiwaki, T. Suzuki) – 52:10	6–1

14 min
Penalties
28 min
40
Shots
27

3 February; 19:00	Kazakhstan	35–0 (12–0, 11–0, 12–0)	Chinese Taipei	Kazakhstan Sports Palace 1, Astana; Attendance: 4,700

Game reference

Vitaliy Kolesnik
Ivan Poloshkov
Goalies
Ting Pang-keng
Lin Tsung-han
Referees:
Sergey Kulakov (RUS)
Aleksi Rantala (FIN)

Khudyakov (Dudarev, Fadeyev) – 01:53	1–0
Starchenko (Zhailauov, Khudyakov) – 02:03	2–0
Koledayev (Bumagin) – 02:58	3–0
Krasnoslobodtsev (Zhailauov) – 03:40	4–0
Upper (Dudarev) – 03:49	5–0
Krasnoslobodtsev (Khudyakov) – 05:22	6–0
Zhailauov (Starchenko) – 09:09	7–0
Bumagin (Solarev, Polishchuk) – 14:34	8–0
Krasnoslobodtsev (Zhailauov, Upper) – 15:09	9–0
Belyayev (Dudarev, Gavrilin) – 15:20	10–0
Gavrilin (Dudarev, Belyayev) – 15:35	11–0
Starchenko (Savchenko, Zhailauov) – 15:47	12–0
Vassilchenko (Dudarev) – 21:24	13–0
Krasnoslobodtsev – 22:29	14–0
Solarev (Litvinenko, Polishchuk) – 24:09	15–0
Krasnoslobodtsev (Zhailauov) – 24:49	16–0
Khudyakov (Zhailauov, Starchenko) – 26:34	17–0
Zhailauov (Starchenko, Khudyakov) – 27:28	18–0
Upper (Zhailauov, Krasnoslobodtsev) – 29:27	19–0
Starchenko (Krasnoslobodtsev) – 31:45	20–0
Koledayev (Bumagin, Polishchuk) – 32:23	21–0
Krasnoslobodtsev (Zhailauov) – 33:31	22–0
Khudyakov (Zhailauov, Fadeyev) – 35:45	23–0
Vassilchenko (Krasnoslobodtsev) (SH) – 41:37	24–0
Khudyakov (Zhailauov, Starchenko) – 43:53	25–0
Dudarev (Belyayev, Vassilchenko) – 48:24	26–0
Starchenko (Savchenko) – 48:32	27–0
Polishchuk – 49:47	28–0
Zhailauov (Krasnoslobodtsev) – 50:38	29–0
Belyayev – 51:41	30–0
Starchenko (Savchenko, Zhailauov) – 52:24	31–0
Polishchuk (Solarev) – 53:46	32–0
Belyayev – 56:02	33–0
Blokhin (Polishchuk) – 58:49	34–0
Krasnoslobodtsev (Gavrilin) – 59:57	35–0

2 min
Penalties
4 min
104
Shots
7

4 February; 14:30	China	10–1 (3–0, 5–1, 2–0)	Chinese Taipei	Kazakhstan Sports Palace 1, Astana; Attendance: 1,900

Game reference

Liu Zhiwei
Han Pengfei
Goalies
Ting Pang-keng
Referees:
Juraj Konc (SVK)
Aleksi Rantala (FIN)

Liu W. (Wang C.) – 05:06	1–0
Zhang W. (Qu, Zhang H.) – 16:02	2–0
Li Z. (Liu W.) – 17:50	3–0
Guo (Jiang N.) – 22:47	4–0
Liu Y. (Fu, Guo) (PP) – 25:22	5–0
Wang D. (Qu) – 25:52	6–0
	6–1	28:34 – Huang Y.C. (Lin Y.)
Zhang W. (Jiang H., Dou) – 32:23	7–1
Zhang H. (Zhang W., Qu) – 33:04	8–1
Wang C. – 42:34	9–1
Zhang H. (Wang D., Qu) – 49:29	10–1

4 min
Penalties
6 min
79
Shots
15

4 February; 19:00	South Korea	1–9 (0–3, 1–3, 0–3)	Kazakhstan	Kazakhstan Sports Palace 1, Astana; Attendance: 5,500

Game reference

Park Sung-je
Eum Hyun-seung
Goalies
Vitaliy Kolesnik
Vitaliy Yeremeyev
Referees:
Roman Polak (CZE)
Derek Zalaski (CAN)

	0–1	02:34 – Rymarev (Savchenko)
	0–2	10:33 – Zhailauov (Krasnoslobodtsev)
	0–3	11:57 – Rymarev
Kim Hy. (Kwon) – 21:56	1–3
	1–4	25:13 – Khudyakov (Rymarev) (PP)
	1–5	26:42 – Gavrilin (Novopashin, Zhailauov) (PP)
	1–6	28:34 – Savchenko (Rymarev)
	1–7	41:38 – Blokhin (Rymarev, Yeremeyev)
	1–8	41:59 – Starchenko (Khudyakov, Rymarev)
	1–9	58:55 – Blokhin (Bumagin)

18 min
Penalties
14 min
15
Shots
44

6 February; 10:00	South Korea	11–1 (6–0, 3–1, 2–0)	China	Kazakhstan Sports Palace 1, Astana; Attendance: 1,500

Game reference

Eum Hyun-seung
Goalies
Liu Zhiwei
Referees:
Roman Polak (CZE)
Aleksi Rantala (FIN)

Song (Kwon) – 07:55	1–0
Cho (PP) – 10:31	2–0
Kim Won-J. (Park W.) (PP) – 17:06	3–0
Kim Won-J. (Kim G.) – 17:34	4–0
Kim Hy. (Kwon) – 18:11	5–0
Shin (Lee D., Choi) – 19:55	6–0
Park W. (Lee D.) (PP) – 31:22	7–0
	7–1	32:05 – Wang D.
Lee D. (Cho, Kim K.S.) – 34:52	8–1
Kim K.S. (Song) (PP) – 37:47	9–1
Shin (Suh, Choi) – 54:57	10–1
Kim K.S. (Cho) – 55:39	11–1

27 min
Penalties
16 min
37
Shots
20

6 February; 14:00	Kazakhstan	4–1 (0–0, 2–0, 2–1)	Japan	Kazakhstan Sports Palace 1, Astana; Attendance: 6,000

Game reference

Vitaliy Yeremeyev
Goalies
Yutaka Fukufuji
Referees:
Sergey Kulakov (RUS)
Derek Zalaski (CAN)

Blokhin – 38:46	1–0
Solarev (Fadeyev) – 39:58	2–0
Semenov (Upper) (PP) – 42:46	3–0
	3–1	48:37 – Tonosaki (Tanaka, T. Suzuki) (PP)
Starchenko (Savchenko) – 56:04	4–1

16 min
Penalties
26 min
51
Shots
22

== Final standing ==
Rank	Team	Pld	W	OW	OL	L
1st place, gold medalist(s)	Kazakhstan	4	4	0	0	0
2nd place, silver medalist(s)	Japan	4	3	0	0	1
3rd place, bronze medalist(s)	South Korea	4	2	0	0	2
4	China	4	1	0	0	3
5	Chinese Taipei	4	0	0	0	4
6	Kyrgyzstan	6	6	0	0	0
7	Thailand	6	5	0	0	1
8	United Arab Emirates	6	4	0	0	2
9	Mongolia	6	3	0	0	3
10	Malaysia	6	2	0	0	4
11	Athletes from Kuwait	6	1	0	0	5
12	Bahrain	6	0	0	0	6
