= List of people from Hokkaido =

The following is a list of notable people from Hokkaido.

== Musicians ==
- Asami Abe
- Natsumi Abe
- Morio Agata
- Umeko Ando
- Rion Azuma
- Miki Fujimoto
- Nanami Hashimoto
- Masato Hatanaka
- Ryōhei Hirose
- DJ Honda
- Takashi Hosokawa
- Akira Ifukube
- Kaori Iida
- Fumito Iwai
- Jiro
- Saya Kawamoto
- Asami Kimura
- Saburō Kitajima
- Makoto Kitayama
- Hikaru Kotobuki
- Mai
- Masaki Yamada
- Chiharu Matsuyama
- Michiya Mihashi
- Miz
- Yutaka Mizutani
- Koichi Morita
- Hideki Naganuma
- Ken Narita
- Maki Nomiya
- Kiyofumi Ohno
- Oki
- Yuuki Ozaki
- Anna Saeki
- Maya Sakura
- Masaru Sato
- Shela
- Mikuni Shimokawa
- Takuro
- Kōji Tamaki
- Teru
- Misuzu Togashi
- Miyoshi Umeki
- Miho Yabe
- Ichiro Yamaguchi
- Miwa Yoshida
- Yuki
- Hiroaki Zakōji

== Sportspeople ==
- Seiji Aochi
- Ken Fujikawa
- Shoko Fujimura
- Chisato Fukushima
- Michiko Fukushima
- Yumie Funayama
- Takuya Furuya
- Seiko Hashimoto
- Manabu Horii
- Hamuko Hoshi
- Takashi Iizuka
- Sumie Inagaki
- Shiho Ishizawa
- Daiki Ito
- Seizo Izumiya
- Shoji Jo
- Noriaki Kasai
- Kazuya Kawabata
- Makoto Kawashima
- Shohei Kiyohara
- Yukari Konishi
- Masayuki Kono
- Shuhei Kuji
- Kazuyuki Kyoya
- Hitoshi Matsushima
- Kohei Mitamura
- Koji Mitsui
- Yuji Miura
- Tōru Mori
- Keiichiro Nagashima
- Daisuke Naito
- Tomoka Nakagawa
- Yuki Nakai
- Tatsuki Nara
- Masahiro Nasukawa
- Satoru Noda
- Kimie Noto
- Yoshiaki Numata
- Daisuke Obara
- Saori Obata
- Ayumi Ogasawara
- Masafumi Ogawa
- Yasunori Ogura
- Yūya Oikawa
- Mayumi Oiwa
- Takanobu Okabe
- Tetsuya Okabe
- Tomomi Okazaki
- Masumi Ono
- Takayuki Ono
- Hideyuki Osawa
- Misaki Oshigiri
- Hiroya Saitō
- Takeshi Saito
- Tetsuya Saito
- Shota Sakaki
- Kazumasa Sasaki
- Jin Sato
- Shoichi Sato
- Yoshinori Sato
- Riko Sawayanagi
- Ryo Shibata
- Hiroki Shibuya
- Hiroyasu Shimizu
- Seiichi Sugano
- Kazuhiko Sugawara
- Kota Sugawara
- Tomo Sugawara
- Toshihiro Sugiura
- Hideki Suzuki
- Kentaro Suzuki
- Masahito Suzuki
- Takahito Suzuki
- Takao Suzuki
- Maki Tabata
- Miho Takagi
- Nana Takagi
- Katsunari Takahashi
- Seiji Takahashi
- Yoko Takahashi
- Kazuhiro Takami
- Megumi Takase
- Shota Takekuma
- Kohei Tanaka
- Masami Tanaka
- Toshiaki Tanaka
- Sakurako Terada
- Tomahawk T.T.
- Yugo Tsukita
- Sakie Tsukuda
- Makoto Tsuruga
- Rempei Uchida
- Hideaki Ueno
- Koichi Wajima
- Tsutomu Wakamatsu
- Shane Williamson
- Megumi Yabushita
- Hirokazu Yagi
- Hiromi Yamamoto
- Ayatsugu Yamashita
- Takafumi Yamashita
- Takuro Yamashita
- Shinya Yanadori
- Junki Yokono
- Keiichi Zaizen
- Nobuyuki Zaizen
