= Ice hockey at the 2011 Asian Winter Games =

- Venue: Kazakhstan Sports Palace; Baluan Sholak Sports Palace
- Dates: 28 January – 6 February 2011
- Competitors: 350 from 13 nations

Ice hockey at the 2011 Asian Winter Games was held in Astana (men) and Almaty (women) in Kazakhstan from 28 January to 6 February.

For these games, the men were competing in a 14-team tournament, and the women in a 5-team tournament. Ice hockey preliminaries actually started two days before the Opening Ceremony of the Games on 30 January.

For the first time ever, there were two divisions in the male competition so as to avoid one-sided games seen at the last edition of the games. India and Qatar withdrew and 12 nations competed in the Men's tournament. All games were played at the Kazakhstan Sports Palace (Arena 1 and 2) in Astana. Kyrgyzstan and Bahrain made their debuts at an international ice hockey tournament. Kazakhstan won the gold medal in both the men's and women's tournaments.

== Schedule ==
●	Classification	●	Round	●	Last round

Event↓/Date →	28th Fri	29th Sat	30th Sun	31st Mon	1st Tue	2nd Wed	3rd Thu	4th Fri	5th Sat	6th Sun
Men	●	●		●	●	●	●	●	●	●
Women	●	●		●	●		●			

== Medalists ==
Event	Gold	Silver	Bronze
Men	Kazakhstan; Vitaliy Yeremeyev; Roman Savchenko; Vitaliy Novopashin; Alexey Litvinenko; Maxim Semenov; Talgat Zhailauov; Yevgeniy Blokhin; Dmitriy Upper; Vitaliy Kolesnik; Ilya Solarev; Fedor Polishchuk; Dmitriy Dudarev; Maxim Belyayev; Yevgeniy Bumagin; Alexey Vassilchenko; Ivan Poloshkov; Andrey Gavrilin; Yevgeniy Fadeyev; Roman Starchenko; Maxim Khudyakov; Alexey Koledayev; Vadim Krasnoslobodtsev; Yevgeniy Rymarev	Japan; Jun Tonosaki; Aaron Keller; Makoto Kawashima; Masato Domeki; Yosuke Kon; Masahito Suzuki; Masahito Nishiwaki; Yosuke Haga; Masafumi Ogawa; Go Tanaka; Takahito Suzuki; Takeshi Saito; Takafumi Yamashita; Shuhei Kuji; Hideyuki Osawa; Hiroki Ueno; Bin Ishioka; Takuma Kawai; Yutaka Fukufuji; Masahito Haruna; Shinya Yanadori	South Korea; Park Sung-je; Lee Don-ku; Kim Woo-jae; Ahn Hyun-min; Kim Dong-hwan; Kim Won-jung; Cho Min-ho; Kim Yoon-hwan; Kim Ki-sung; Kim Sang-wook; Suh Sin-il; Lee Yong-jun; Kwon Tae-an; Kim Kyu-hun; Kim Geun-ho; Choi Jung-sik; Shin Sang-woo; Song Dong-hwan; Kim Hyun-soo; Park Woo-sang; Kim Hyeok; Eum Hyun-seung
Women	Kazakhstan; Aizhan Raushanova; Galina Shu; Lyubov Ibragimova; Olga Potapova; Yelena Shtelmaister; Zarina Tukhtiyeva; Viktoriya Mussatayeva; Larissa Sviridova; Galiya Nurgaliyeva; Olga Konysheva; Olga Kryukova; Natalya Yakovchuk; Darya Obydennova; Viktoriya Sazonova; Tatyana Koroleva; Albina Suprun; Anna Kossenko; Alena Fux; Mariya Topkayeva; Alexandra Ashikhina; Natalya Trunova; Anastassiya Orlova	Japan; Azusa Nakaoku; Shiori Koike; Yoko Kondo; Nachi Fujimoto; Kanae Aoki; Sena Suzuki; Mika Hori; Tomoe Yamane; Mai Morii; Haruna Yoneyama; Yurie Adachi; Chiho Osawa; Moeko Fujimoto; Tomo Eguchi; Saki Shimozawa; Yuka Hirano; Tomoko Sakagami; Shizuka Takahashi; Miho Shishiuchi; Ami Nakamura; Nodoka Abe	China; Han Danni; Yu Baiwei; Kong Minghui; Lou Yue; Liu Zhixin; Zhang Mengying; Wang Nan; Zhang Ben; Huang Haijing; Jin Fengling; Sun Rui; Ma Rui; Cui Shanshan; Jiang Na; Huo Cui; Fang Xin; Tang Liang; Gao Fujin; Shi Yao; Qi Xueting; Zhang Shuang

== Medal table ==
Rank	Nation	Gold	Silver	Bronze	Total
1	Kazakhstan (KAZ)	2	0	0	2
2	Japan (JPN)	0	2	0	2
3	China (CHN)	0	0	1	1
3	South Korea (KOR)	0	0	1	1
Totals (4 entries)		2	2	2	6

== Draw ==
The top division was consisted of five teams, North Korea withdrew and replaced by 2010 IIHF Challenge Cup of Asia winner Chinese Taipei.

- Japan
- Kazakhstan
- South Korea
- China
- Chinese Taipei

Nine teams registered for the premier division.

Group A

- United Arab Emirates
- ~~India~~*
- ~~Qatar~~*

Group B

- Thailand
- Athletes from Kuwait
- Mongolia

Group C

- Malaysia
- Mongolia
- Bahrain

* India and Qatar withdrew, and the format changed into a round robin competition.

== Final standing ==
=== Men ===
Rank	Team	Pld	W	OW	OL	L
1st place, gold medalist(s)	Kazakhstan	4	4	0	0	0
2nd place, silver medalist(s)	Japan	4	3	0	0	1
3rd place, bronze medalist(s)	South Korea	4	2	0	0	2
4	China	4	1	0	0	3
5	Chinese Taipei	4	0	0	0	4
6	Kyrgyzstan	6	6	0	0	0
7	Thailand	6	5	0	0	1
8	United Arab Emirates	6	4	0	0	2
9	Mongolia	6	3	0	0	3
10	Malaysia	6	2	0	0	4
11	Athletes from Kuwait	6	1	0	0	5
12	Bahrain	6	0	0	0	6

=== Women ===
Rank	Team	Pld	W	OW	OL	L
1st place, gold medalist(s)	Kazakhstan	4	3	1	0	0
2nd place, silver medalist(s)	Japan	4	2	1	1	0
3rd place, bronze medalist(s)	China	4	2	0	1	1
4	North Korea	4	1	0	0	3
5	South Korea	4	0	0	0	4
