= Shin Sang-woo =

Shin Sang-woo may refer to:

- Shin Sang-woo (ice hockey)
- Shin Sang-woo (footballer)
