= Masahito Suzuki =

Masahito Suzuki may refer to:

- Masahito Suzuki (ice hockey) (鈴木 雅仁, born 1983), Japanese ice hockey player
- Masahito Suzuki (footballer) (鈴木 正人, born 1977), Japanese footballer
