= Domeki =

Domeki may refer to:

- Domeki Station, a railway station in Eiheiji, Fukui Prefecture, Japan
- Masato Domeki (born 1983), Japanese ice hockey player
- Shizuka Dōmeki, a fictional character in the manga series xxxHolic
- Kai Domeki, a character in the Osu! Tatakae! Ouendan rhythm video game duology
