= Fyodor Polishchuk =

Kazakhstani ice hockey player

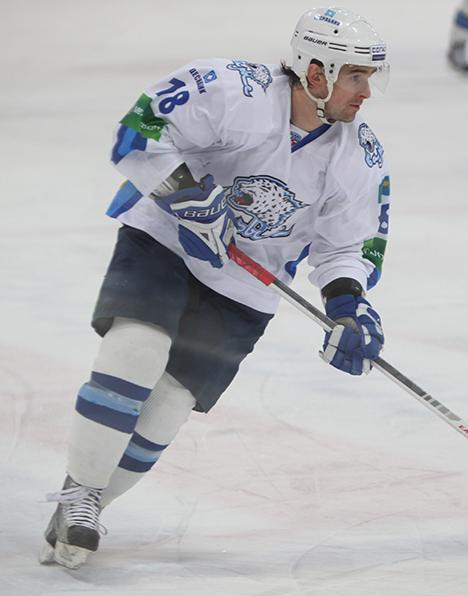
- Born: July 4, 1979 (age 47) Kolodyste (now in Uman Raion), Ukrainian SSR, Soviet Union
- Height: 5 ft 9 in (175 cm)
- Weight: 172 lb (78 kg; 12 st 4 lb)
- Position: Centre
- Shot: Left
- KHL team Former teams: Metallurg Novokuznetsk; Kazzinc-Torpedo; Metallurg Novokuznetsk; SKA Saint Petersburg; Barys Astana
- National team: Kazakhstan
- Playing career: 1995–2019
Medal record
Men's ice hockey
Representing Kazakhstan
Asian Games
Gold medal – first place	2011 Astana-Almaty	Tournament
Silver medal – second place	2003 Aomori	Tournament

Fyodor Vasilievich Polischuk (Фёдор Васильевич Полищук; born July 4, 1979) is a Kazakhstani professional ice hockey left winger currently playing for Metallurg Novokuznetsk of the Kontinental Hockey League.

Polischuk previously played for Torpedo Ust-Kamenogorsk in the Vysshaya Liga between 1998 and 2004 before moving to the Russian Superleague with Metallurg Novokuznetsk. After one season he moved to SKA Saint Petersburg before returning to Metallurg Novokuznetsk during the 2006–07 season. He remained until 2010 when he joined Barys Astana.

He is a member of the Kazakhstan national team and participated in the 2006 Winter Olympics in Turin.

== Early life ==
Polischuk was born in the village of Kolodyste, located in Cherkassy Oblast, Ukraine.

== Career statistics ==
=== Regular season and playoffs ===
			Regular season					Playoffs
Season	Team	League	GP	G	A	Pts	PIM	GP	G	A	Pts	PIM
1995–96	Torpedo–2 Ust–Kamenogorsk	RUS.2	2	0	0	0	2	—	—	—	—	—
1996–97	Torpedo–2 Ust–Kamenogorsk	RUS.3	4	1	2	3	0	—	—	—	—	—
1997–98	Torpedo Ust–Kamenogorsk	RUS.2	4	1	0	1	0	—	—	—	—	—
1997–98	Torpedo–2 Ust–Kamenogorsk	RUS.3	43	14	8	22	18	—	—	—	—	—
1998–99	Torpedo Ust–Kamenogorsk	RUS.2	6	0	2	2	22	—	—	—	—	—
1998–99	Torpedo–2 Ust–Kamenogorsk	RUS.3	35	16	7	23	2	—	—	—	—	—
1999–2000	Torpedo Ust–Kamenogorsk	RUS.3	39	21	25	46	10	—	—	—	—	—
2000–01	Kazzinc–Torpedo	RUS.3	53	23	25	48	26	—	—	—	—	—
2001–02	Kazzinc–Torpedo	RUS.2	54	29	29	58	24	—	—	—	—	—
2002–03	Kazzinc–Torpedo	RUS.2	47	22	27	49	26	—	—	—	—	—
2003–04	Kazzinc–Torpedo	KAZ	22	10	16	26	2	—	—	—	—	—
2003–04	Kazzinc–Torpedo	RUS.2	48	22	19	41	20	—	—	—	—	—
2004–05	Metallurg Novokuznetsk	RSL	52	11	14	25	18	4	1	0	1	0
2004–05	Metallurg–2 Novokuznetsk	RUS.3	1	0	0	0	2	—	—	—	—	—
2005–06	SKA St. Petersburg	RSL	42	6	7	13	51	3	0	0	0	2
2005–06	SKA–2 St. Petersburg	RUS.3	1	1	4	5	0	—	—	—	—	—
2006–07	SKA St. Petersburg	RSL	18	1	2	3	16	—	—	—	—	—
2006–07	SKA–2 St. Petersburg	RUS.3	4	2	0	2	8	—	—	—	—	—
2006–07	Metallurg Novokuznetsk	RSL	24	7	6	13	22	3	2	2	4	0
2007–08	Metallurg Novokuznetsk	RSL	56	7	12	19	42	—	—	—	—	—
2008–09	Metallurg Novokuznetsk	KHL	32	5	9	14	20	—	—	—	—	—
2009–10	Metallurg Novokuznetsk	KHL	53	6	18	24	18	—	—	—	—	—
2010–11	Barys Astana	KHL	43	1	7	8	18	4	0	0	0	0
2011–12	Barys Astana	KHL	52	4	2	6	8	7	0	0	0	0
2012–13	Barys Astana	KHL	41	4	12	16	14	7	3	0	3	4
2013–14	Barys Astana	KHL	48	5	5	10	24	10	0	1	1	6
2014–15	Barys Astana	KHL	23	0	0	0	6	6	1	0	1	8
2015–16	Barys Astana	KHL	20	0	0	0	2	—	—	—	—	—
2015–16	Metallurg Novokuznetsk	KHL	20	4	3	7	10	—	—	—	—	—
2016–17	Metallurg Novokuznetsk	KHL	54	2	5	7	24	—	—	—	—	—
2017–18	Torpedo Ust–Kamenogorsk	VHL	27	1	7	8	10	—	—	—	—	—
2018–19	HK Astana	KAZ	14	0	2	2	6	—	—	—	—	—
RUS.2/VHL totals			198	75	84	159	104	12	5	2	7	10
RSL totals			192	32	41	73	149	10	3	2	5	2
KHL totals			386	31	61	92	144	34	4	1	5	18

=== International ===
Year	Team	Event	GP	G	A	Pts	PIM
1997	Kazakhstan	AJC	3	3	1	4
1999	Kazakhstan	WJC	6	0	1	1	0
2000	Kazakhstan	WC B	7	3	1	4	4
2001	Kazakhstan	WC D1	5	1	1	2	2
2002	Kazakhstan	WC D1	5	1	7	8	2
2003	Kazakhstan	WC D1	5	2	6	8	0
2004	Kazakhstan	WC	6	0	1	1	2
2005	Kazakhstan	OGQ	3	0	1	1	0
2005	Kazakhstan	WC	6	0	0	0	8
2006	Kazakhstan	OG	5	0	1	1	6
2011	Kazakhstan	AWG	4	2	7	9	0
2011	Kazakhstan	WC D1	5	2	3	5	4
2012	Kazakhstan	WC	7	1	0	1	4
2013	Kazakhstan	OGQ	3	0	1	1	0
2013	Kazakhstan	WC D1A	5	0	1	1	6
2014	Kazakhstan	WC	6	1	2	3	4
2015	Kazakhstan	WC D1A	4	2	2	4	0
Senior totals			76	15	34	49	42
