= Jun Tonosaki =

Japanese ice hockey player

- Born: January 9, 1984 (age 42) Sapporo, Hokkaidō, Japan
- Height: 5 ft 7 in (170 cm)
- Weight: 154 lb (70 kg; 11 st 0 lb)
- Position: Defenceman
- Shoots: Left
- Played for: Asia League; Nippon Paper Cranes
- National team: Japan
- Playing career: 2006–present

Jun Tonosaki
Medal record

Men's ice hockey

Representing Japan

Asian Games
Gold medal – first place	2007 Changchun	Ice hockey
Silver medal – second place	2011 Astana-Almaty	Ice hockey

Jun Tonosaki (外崎潤), born January 9, 1984, is a Japanese professional ice hockey Defenceman currently playing for the Nippon Paper Cranes of the Asia League.

Since 2005 (the beginning of his professional career), he plays for the Nippon Paper Cranes. He also has played for the Japan national team since the year 2006.
