= Hiroki Ueno (ice hockey) =

Japanese ice hockey player

- Born: April 8, 1986 (age 40) Nagano, Japan
- Height: 5 ft 10 in (178 cm)
- Weight: 179 lb (81 kg; 12 st 11 lb)
- Position: Winger
- Shoots: Left
- ALIH team Former teams: East Hokkaido Cranes; High1; Nikkō Ice Bucks; Nippon Paper Cranes
- National team: Japan
- Playing career: 2009–present

Hiroki Ueno
Medal record

Men's ice hockey

Representing Japan

Asian Games
Silver medal – second place	2011 Astana-Almaty	Ice hockey

Hiroki Ueno (上野 拓紀, born April 8, 1986) is a Japanese professional ice hockey winger currently playing for the East Hokkaido Cranes of the Asia League.

Since 2011 he plays for the Nikkō Ice Bucks. He previously played between 2009–2011 for the Asia League Korean team High1 and, at university level, for the Waseda University. During the 2014–15 season Ueno scored 80 points to lead the Asia League in scoring (while tied with Michael Swift in points, Ueno had more goals and was therefore credited as the scoring leader); this made him only the second Asian player to win the scoring title in the league, after fellow Japanese Go Tanaka in 2010–11. He has played for the Japanese national team since 2006.
