= Roman Savchenko =

Kazakhstani ice hockey player

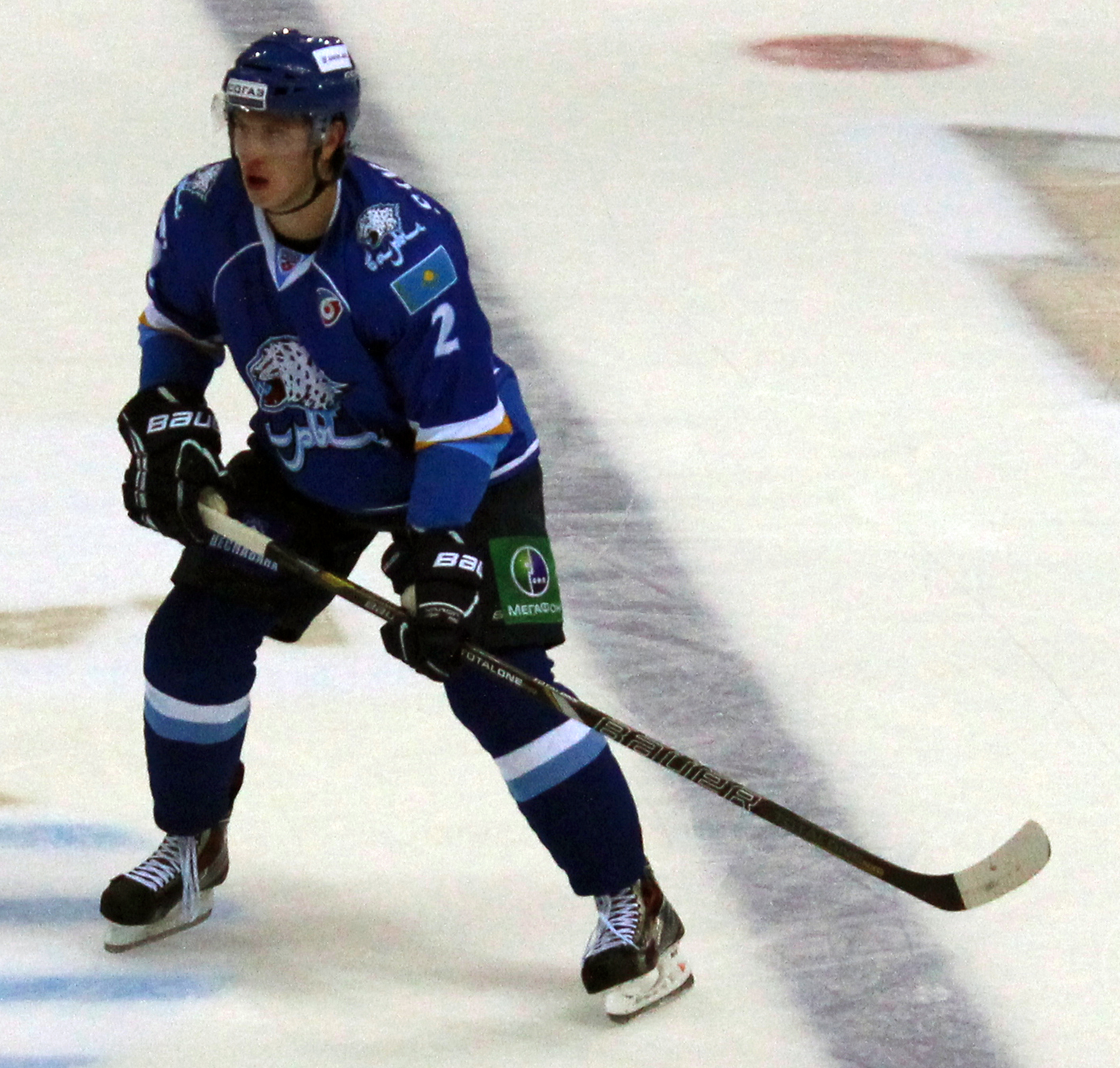
- Savchenko with Barys in 2013.
- Born: July 28, 1988 (age 36); Oskemen, Kazakhstan
- Height: 1.88 m (6 ft 2 in)
- Weight: 86 kg (190 lb; 13 st 8 lb)
- Position: Defence
- Shoots: Left
- KHL team Former teams: Barys Nur-Sultan; Sibir Novosibirsk; Lokomotiv Yaroslavl
- National team: Kazakhstan
- Playing career: 2006–present

Roman Viktorovich Savchenko (Russian: Роман Викторович Са́вченко; born July 28, 1988) is a Kazakhstani professional ice hockey defenceman who currently plays for Barys Nur-Sultan of the Kontinental Hockey League (KHL).

== Playing career ==
Having played with his native club, Barys Astana, since the inception of the KHL, Savchenko left as a free agent following his 10th season with the club in 2017–18. He opted to continue in the KHL, agreeing to a one-year contract with Russian outfit, HC Sibir Novosibirsk on 23 August 2018.

After one season with Sibir, Savchenko left as a free agent to sign a one-year contract with Lokomotiv Yaroslavl on 14 May 2019.

Savchenko played two seasons with Lokomotiv Yaroslavl before returning to Barys as a free agent on a one-year contract on 13 July 2021.

== Career statistics ==
=== Regular season and playoffs ===
			Regular season					Playoffs
Season	Team	League	GP	G	A	Pts	PIM	GP	G	A	Pts	PIM
2005–06	Kazzinc-Torpedo	RUS–2	1	0	0	0	29	—	—	—	—	—
2006–07	Kazzinc-Torpedo	RUS–2	17	1	2	3	12	—	—	—	—	—
2007–08	Kazzinc-Torpedo	RUS–2	26	2	1	3	18	6	0	1	1	0
2008–09	Kazzinc-Torpedo	RUS–2	28	7	11	18	16	—	—	—	—	—
2008–09	Barys Astana	KHL	19	1	8	9	6	—	—	—	—	—
2009–10	Barys Astana	KHL	37	3	4	7	22	3	0	0	0	0
2010–11	Barys Astana	KHL	52	5	9	14	34	4	0	0	0	2
2011–12	Barys Astana	KHL	22	1	0	1	21	5	0	0	0	2
2012–13	Barys Astana	KHL	50	10	10	20	18	7	1	4	5	2
2013–14	Barys Astana	KHL	54	5	12	17	36	10	2	4	6	18
2014–15	Barys Astana	KHL	59	3	10	13	59	7	1	2	3	0
2015–16	Barys Astana	KHL	52	9	8	17	38	—	—	—	—	—
2016–17	Barys Astana	KHL	50	4	9	13	39	9	0	0	0	4
2017–18	Barys Astana	KHL	49	4	7	11	35	—	—	—	—	—
2018–19	Sibir Novosibirsk	KHL	46	2	2	4	20	—	—	—	—	—
2019–20	Lokomotiv Yaroslavl	KHL	61	5	7	12	18	6	0	2	2	0
2020–21	Lokomotiv Yaroslavl	KHL	12	1	0	1	14	—	—	—	—	—
2021–22	Barys Nur-Sultan	KHL	31	2	4	6	43	5	0	0	0	0
KHL totals			594	55	90	145	403	56	4	12	16	28

Medal record

Representing Kazakhstan

Ice hockey

Asian Winter Games
Gold medal – first place	2011 Astana-Almaty	

=== International ===
Year	Team	Event	GP	G	A	Pts	PIM
2005	Kazakhstan	WJC18-D1	5	3	1	4	8
2006	Kazakhstan	WJC-D1	5	2	1	3	10
2006	Kazakhstan	WJC-D1	5	0	1	1	4
2007	Kazakhstan	WJC-D1	5	1	0	1	10
2008	Kazakhstan	WJC	6	0	3	3	12
2009	Kazakhstan	OGQ	6	3	1	4	4
2009	Kazakhstan	WC-D1	5	2	2	4	6
2011	Kazakhstan	AWG	4	1	7	8	2
2012	Kazakhstan	WC	7	1	1	2	14
2013	Kazakhstan	OGQ	2	0	0	0	2
2013	Kazakhstan	WC-D1	5	1	3	4	2
2014	Kazakhstan	WC	7	0	1	1	2
2015	Kazakhstan	WC-D1	5	1	1	2	2
2016	Kazakhstan	WC	6	2	1	3	8
2016	Kazakhstan	OGQ	3	0	1	1	2
2017	Kazakhstan	WC-D1	5	0	1	1	6
Junior totals			26	6	6	12	44
Senior totals			62	11	13	24	52
