= Alexei Vasilchenko =

Kazakhstani ice hockey player

Alexei Vassilchenko
- Born: March 29, 1981 (age 43); Ust-Kamenogorsk, Soviet Union
- Height: 6 ft 2 in (188 cm)
- Weight: 198 lb (90 kg; 14 st 2 lb)
- Position: Defence
- Shot: Left
- Played for: Gyergyói Hoki Klub; Metallurg Novokuznetsk; HC Spartak Moscow; Salavat Yulaev Ufa; HC Neftekhimik Nizhnekamsk; HC CSKA Moscow; HC MVD; Barys Astana; Traktor Chelyabinsk; HC Ugra
- National team: Kazakhstan
- Playing career: 1998–2019

Alexei Aleksandrovich Vasilchenko (Russian: Алексей Александрович Васильченко; born 29 March 1981) is a Kazakhstani former ice hockey defenceman. Vassilchenko previously played in the Russian Superleague for Metallurg Novokuznetsk, HC Spartak Moscow, Salavat Yulaev Ufa, HC Neftekhimik Nizhnekamsk, HC CSKA Moscow and HC MVD. In 2008, he joined Barys Astana for the newly formed Kontinental Hockey League (KHL). He played parts of nine seasons in the KHL between 2008 and 2017.

== International career ==
Vasilchenko is a veteran member of the Kazakhstan men's national ice hockey team who has participated at the Ice Hockey World Championships in 2001, 2002, 2005, 2010, and 2011.

He also competed with the Kazakhstan team at the 2006 Winter Olympics.

== Career statistics ==
=== Regular season and playoffs ===
			Regular season					Playoffs
Season	Team	League	GP	G	A	Pts	PIM	GP	G	A	Pts	PIM
1998–99	Torpedo–2 Ust–Kamenogorsk	RUS.3	4	0	0	0	2	—	—	—	—	—
1999–2000	Torpedo Ust–Kamenogorsk	RUS.3	34	2	5	7	38	—	—	—	—	—
1999–2000	Torpedo Ust–Kamenogorsk	RUS.3	34	2	5	7	38	—	—	—	—	—
2000–01	Kazzinc–Torpedo	RUS.3	47	1	9	10	133	—	—	—	—	—
2001–02	Kazzinc–Torpedo	RUS.2	52	3	10	13	152	—	—	—	—	—
2001–02	Torpedo–2 Ust–Kamenogorsk	RUS.3	1	0	1	1	4	—	—	—	—	—
2002–03	Spartak Moscow	RSL	17	0	1	1	18	—	—	—	—	—
2002–03	Spartak–2 Moscow	RUS.3	6	0	3	3	6	—	—	—	—	—
2002–03	Khimik Voskresensk	RUS.2	9	0	1	1	8	2	0	1	1	27
2002–03	Khimik–2 Voskresensk	RUS.3	8	1	1	2	42	—	—	—	—	—
2003–04	Salavat Yulaev Ufa	RSL	23	0	2	2	18	—	—	—	—	—
2003–04	Salavat Yulaev–2 Ufa	RUS.3	11	0	8	8	6	—	—	—	—	—
2004–05	Neftekhimik Nizhnekamsk	RSL	34	0	1	1	60	—	—	—	—	—
2004–05	Neftekhimik–2 Nizhnekamsk	RUS.3	5	1	0	1	6	—	—	—	—	—
2005–06	Neftekhimik Nizhnekamsk	RSL	38	2	1	3	46	4	0	0	0	2
2006–07	Neftekhimik Nizhnekamsk	RSL	36	1	6	7	85	2	0	0	0	2
2007–08	CSKA Moscow	RSL	34	0	5	5	48	—	—	—	—	—
2007–08	HC MVD	RSL	18	0	0	0	35	—	—	—	—	—
2008–09	Barys Astana	KHL	28	0	4	4	77	3	0	1	1	2
2009–10	Barys Astana	KHL	53	2	9	11	77	3	0	0	0	8
2009–10	Barys–2 Astana	KAZ	1	0	0	0	0	—	—	—	—	—
2010–11	Barys Astana	KHL	34	1	3	4	24	1	0	0	0	2
2011–12	Traktor Chelyabinsk	KHL	48	2	5	7	68	16	0	3	3	20
2012–13	Traktor Chelyabinsk	KHL	44	0	5	5	56	25	2	3	5	28
2013–14	Traktor Chelyabinsk	KHL	44	1	3	4	40	—	—	—	—	—
2014–15	Traktor Chelyabinsk	KHL	29	1	1	2	22	4	0	0	0	5
2014–15	Chelmet Chelyabinsk	VHL	7	0	1	1	10	—	—	—	—	—
2015–16	HC Yugra	KHL	47	1	1	2	52	—	—	—	—	—
2016–17	Metallurg Novokuznetsk	KHL	49	2	3	5	72	—	—	—	—	—
2017–18	Metallurg Novokuznetsk	VHL	24	1	2	3	49	—	—	—	—	—
2018–19	CS Progym Gheorgheni	EL	10	1	1	2	24	—	—	—	—	—
2018–19	CS Progym Gheorgheni	ROU	5	0	0	0	24	—	—	—	—	—
2018–19	Buran Voronezh	VHL	2	0	0	0	2	—	—	—	—	—
RSL totals			201	3	16	19	310	6	0	0	0	4
KHL totals			376	10	34	44	488	52	2	7	9	65

=== International ===
Year	Team	Event	GP	G	A	Pts	PIM
1999	Kazakhstan	EJC D1	3	0	1	1	0
2000	Kazakhstan	WJC	7	0	1	1	6
2001	Kazakhstan	WJC	6	0	1	1	20
2001	Kazakhstan	WC D1	5	0	0	0	2
2002	Kazakhstan	WC D1	5	0	0	0	4
2005	Kazakhstan	WC	1	0	0	0	0
2006	Kazakhstan	OG	5	0	1	1	8
2010	Kazakhstan	WC	6	0	1	1	10
2011	Kazakhstan	AWG	4	3	1	4	2
2011	Kazakhstan	WC	5	0	2	2	6
2014	Kazakhstan	WC	7	0	1	1	22
Junior totals			16	0	3	3	26
Senior totals			38	3	6	9	54
