= Dmitri Dudarev =

Kazakhstani ice hockey player

- Born: 23 February 1976 (age 49) Ust-Kamenogorsk, Soviet Union
- Height: 6 ft 2 in (188 cm)
- Weight: 209 lb (95 kg; 14 st 13 lb)
- Position: Right wing
- Shot: Right
- Played for: Kazzinc-Torpedo; Avangard Omsk; Severstal Cherepovets; HC Dynamo Moscow; HC Sibir; Ak Bars Kazan; HC MVD; HC Amur Khabarovsk; Metallurg Novokuznetsk
- National team: Kazakhstan
- Playing career: 1992–2014

Dmitriy Viktorovich Dudarev (Russian: Дмитрий Викторович Дударев; born 23 February 1976) is a Kazakhstani former professional ice hockey winger who notably played for Metallurg Novokuznetsk of the Kontinental Hockey League (KHL). He participated at the 2010 IIHF World Championship as a member of the Kazakhstan men's national ice hockey team.

== Career statistics ==
=== Regular season and playoffs ===
			Regular season					Playoffs
Season	Team	League	GP	G	A	Pts	PIM	GP	G	A	Pts	PIM
1992–93	Torpedo–2 Ust–Kamenogorsk	RUS.2	13	4	2	6	4	—	—	—	—	—
1993–94	Torpedo Ust–Kamenogorsk	IHL	9	0	0	0	2	—	—	—	—	—
1993–94	Torpedo–2 Ust–Kamenogorsk	RUS.3	—	—	—	—	—	—	—	—	—	—
1994–95	Torpedo Ust–Kamenogorsk	IHL	30	2	2	4	22	2	0	0	0	0
1995–96	Torpedo Ust–Kamenogorsk	IHL	47	3	6	9	32	—	—	—	—	—
1995–96	Torpedo–2 Ust–Kamenogorsk	RUS.2	2	0	0	0	0	—	—	—	—	—
1996–97	Torpedo Ust–Kamenogorsk	RUS.2	26	10	13	23	18	—	—	—	—	—
1996–97	Torpedo–2 Ust–Kamenogorsk	RUS.3	4	2	2	4	8	—	—	—	—	—
1996–97	Avangard Omsk	RSL	4	1	0	1	2	1	0	0	0	0
1997–98	Severstal Cherepovets	RSL	39	9	8	17	20	—	—	—	—	—
1997–98	Severstal–2 Cherepovets	RUS.2	2	5	0	5	2	—	—	—	—	—
1998–99	Severstal Cherepovets	RSL	40	5	7	12	68	3	0	0	0	2
1999–2000	EC Wilhelmshaven–Stickhausen	GER.2	38	18	19	37	112	—	—	—	—	—
2000–01	Dynamo Moscow	RSL	34	3	1	4	20	—	—	—	—	—
2000–01	Dynamo–2 Moscow	RUS.3	1	0	0	0	4	—	—	—	—	—
2001–02	Sibir Novosibirsk	RUS.2	42	18	16	34	95	14	8	2	10	8
2002–03	Sibir Novosibirsk	RSL	44	7	6	13	42	—	—	—	—	—
2002–03	Sibir–2 Novosibirsk	RUS.3	5	3	2	5	22	—	—	—	—	—
2003–04	Sibir Novosibirsk	RSL	50	6	4	10	67	—	—	—	—	—
2003–04	Sibir–2 Novosibirsk	RUS.3	2	2	0	2	0	—	—	—	—	—
2004–05	Sibir Novosibirsk	RSL	56	8	9	17	72	—	—	—	—	—
2005–06	Ak Bars Kazan	RSL	22	4	3	7	18	13	1	0	1	18
2005–06	Ak Bars–2 Kazan	RUS.3	2	0	0	0	0	—	—	—	—	—
2006–07	HK MVD	RSL	25	7	2	9	36	—	—	—	—	—
2006–07	HK MVD–2 Balashikha	RUS.4	2	4	1	5	0	—	—	—	—	—
2006–07	Amur Khabarovsk	RSL	24	4	3	7	46	—	—	—	—	—
2007–08	Amur Khabarovsk	RSL	43	6	8	14	64	4	1	0	1	6
2008–09	Metallurg Novokuznetsk	KHL	55	9	10	19	74	—	—	—	—	—
2009–10	Metallurg Novokuznetsk	KHL	56	10	8	18	56	—	—	—	—	—
2010–11	Metallurg Novokuznetsk	KHL	52	6	7	13	48	—	—	—	—	—
2011–12	Kazzinc–Torpedo	VHL	51	10	17	27	100	3	0	0	0	6
2012–13	Sokol Krasnoyarsk	VHL	52	3	9	12	54	—	—	—	—	—
2013–14	Sokol Krasnoyarsk	VHL	23	1	7	8	70	—	—	—	—	—
2013–14	HK Almaty	KAZ	8	4	3	7	4	—	—	—	—	—
IHL totals			86	5	8	13	56	2	0	0	0	0
RSL totals			381	60	51	111	455	21	2	0	2	26
KHL totals			163	25	25	50	178	—	—	—	—	—

=== International ===
Year	Team	Event	GP	G	A	Pts	PIM
1993	Kazakhstan	AJC	4	3	8	11	0
1995	Kazakhstan	WJC C2	5	5	9	14	6
1996	Kazakhstan	WJC C	4	2	2	4	6
1997	Kazakhstan	WC B	7	0	3	3	2
1998	Kazakhstan	OG	7	1	1	2	0
1998	Kazakhstan	WC	3	0	1	1	2
1999	Kazakhstan	WC B	7	0	2	2	2
1999	Kazakhstan	WC Q	1	0	0	0	4
2004	Kazakhstan	WC	6	0	0	0	4
2005	Kazakhstan	WC	6	1	0	1	4
2006	Kazakhstan	OG	5	0	0	0	2
2010	Kazakhstan	WC	6	4	0	4	8
2011	Kazakhstan	AWG	4	1	5	6	2
2011	Kazakhstan	WC D1	5	2	3	5	2
2012	Kazakhstan	WC	5	0	3	3	0
Junior totals			13	10	19	29	14
Senior totals			62	9	18	27	32
