= Evgeni Blokhin =

Kazakhstani ice hockey player

- Born: May 29, 1979 (age 46); Ust-Kamenogorsk, Kazakh SSR, Soviet Union
- Height: 6 ft 2 in (188 cm)
- Weight: 203 lb (92 kg; 14 st 7 lb)
- Position: Defence
- Shot: Left
- Played for: Lada Togliatti; Dizel Penza; Kazakhmys Karagandy; HC MVD; Metallurg Novokuznetsk; Dynamo Moscow; Sibir Novosibirsk; Neftekhimik Nizhnekamsk; Yugra Khanty-Mansiysk; Barys Astana
- National team: Kazakhstan
- NHL draft: Undrafted
- Playing career: 1996–2015

Yevgeni Anatolyevich Blokhin (Russian: Евгений Анатольевич Блохин; born May 29, 1979) is a Kazakhstani former professional ice hockey defenceman. He was a member of the Kazakhstan men's national ice hockey team at the 2006 Winter Olympics. He also has Russian citizenship.

== International ==
Blokhin was named to the Kazakhstan men's national ice hockey team for competition at the 2014 IIHF World Championship.

== Career statistics ==
=== Regular season and playoffs ===
			Regular season					Playoffs
Season	Team	League	GP	G	A	Pts	PIM	GP	G	A	Pts	PIM
1996–97	Lada Togliatti	RSL	2	0	0	0	2	—	—	—	—	—
1996–97	Lada–2 Togliatti	RUS.3	26	0	1	1	4	—	—	—	—	—
1997–98	Dizel Penza	RSL	21	1	0	1	10	—	—	—	—	—
1997–98	Dizel–2 Penza	RUS.3	11	0	0	0	18	—	—	—	—	—
1997–98	Lada–2 Togliatti	RUS.3	26	6	3	9	10	—	—	—	—	—
1997–98	Lada Togliatti	RSL	—	—	—	—	—	1	0	0	0	0
1998–99	Lada–2 Togliatti	RUS.3	9	3	4	7	8	—	—	—	—	—
1998–99	Torpedo–2 Ust–Kamenogorsk	RUS.3	4	0	1	1	0	—	—	—	—	—
1998–99	Izhstal Izhevsk	RUS.2	17	0	4	4	10	8	0	1	1	2
1999–2000	Izhstal Izhevsk	RUS.2	18	0	3	3	10	—	—	—	—	—
1999–2000	Izhstal–2 Izhevsk	RUS.3	16	6	3	9	12	—	—	—	—	—
2000–01	Izhstal Izhevsk	RUS.2	40	2	2	4	8	—	—	—	—	—
2001–02	Motor Barnaul	RUS.2	44	4	10	14	24	—	—	—	—	—
2002–03	Motor Barnaul	RUS.2	40	4	5	9	26	—	—	—	—	—
2003–04	Motor Barnaul	RUS.2	44	6	9	15	46	2	0	0	0	0
2003–04	Motor–2 Barnaul	RUS.3	4	1	7	8	2	—	—	—	—	—
2004–05	Kazakhmys Karaganda	KAZ	23	0	5	5	2	—	—	—	—	—
2004–05	Kazakhmys Karaganda	RUS.2	48	4	15	19	30	—	—	—	—	—
2005–06	HC MVD	RSL	36	0	3	3	30	—	—	—	—	—
2005–06	HC MVD–HK Tver	RUS.3	2	0	0	0	0	—	—	—	—	—
2006–07	Metallurg Novokuznetsk	RSL	22	0	1	1	20	—	—	—	—	—
2006–07	Dynamo Moscow	RSL	23	0	3	3	44	3	0	0	0	2
2007–08	Dynamo Moscow	RSL	1	0	0	0	2	—	—	—	—	—
2007–08	Dynamo–2 Moscow	RUS.3	5	2	2	4	8	—	—	—	—	—
2007–08	Sibir Novosibirsk	RSL	21	0	1	1	26	—	—	—	—	—
2007–08	Sibir–2 Novosibirsk	RUS.3	2	0	1	1	0	—	—	—	—	—
2008–09	Neftekhimik Nizhnekamsk	KHL	32	2	3	5	36	3	0	0	0	4
2009–10	HC Yugra	RUS.2	36	2	9	11	46	17	1	7	8	10
2010–11	HC Yugra	KHL	43	3	10	13	54	5	1	0	1	6
2011–12	HC Yugra	KHL	46	5	7	12	56	5	1	1	2	2
2012–13	Neftekhimik Nizhnekamsk	KHL	47	4	7	11	56	—	—	—	—	—
2013–14	Barys Astana	KHL	44	5	7	12	40	3	1	0	1	2
2014–15	Barys Astana	KHL	49	2	11	13	64	3	0	0	0	2
RSL totals			126	1	8	9	134	4	0	0	0	2
RUS.2 totals			287	22	57	79	200	27	1	8	9	12
KHL totals			261	21	45	66	304	19	3	1	4	16

=== International ===
Year	Team	Event	GP	G	A	Pts	PIM
1999	Kazakhstan	WJC	6	0	0	0	12
2005	Kazakhstan	OGQ	3	0	0	0	2
2005	Kazakhstan	WC	6	0	1	1	8
2006	Kazakhstan	OG	2	0	0	0	0
2006	Kazakhstan	WC	6	0	1	1	22
2011	Kazakhstan	AWG	3	4	0	4	0
2013	Kazakhstan	OGQ	3	0	0	0	0
2013	Kazakhstan	WC D1A	5	1	0	1	6
2014	Kazakhstan	WC	7	1	3	4	4
Senior totals			35	6	5	11	42

Sporting positions
Preceded by Konstantin Kasatkin	Yugra Khanty-Mansiysk captain 2011–2012	Succeeded by Mikhail Yakubov
