= Evgeni Bumagin =

Kazakh ice hockey player (born 1982)

- Born: April 7, 1982 (age 44) Belgorod, Russia
- Height: 5 ft 11 in (180 cm)
- Weight: 176 lb (80 kg; 12 st 8 lb)
- Position: Right wing
- Shot: Left
- Played for: Sibir Novosibirsk; HC Lada Togliatti; Metallurg Novokuznetsk; Barys Astana
- National team: Kazakhstan
- NHL draft: 260th overall, 2000; Detroit Red Wings
- Playing career: 2000–2015

Evgeni Vladimirovich Bumagin (Russian: Евгений Владимирович Бумагин; born April 7, 1982) is a Russian-Kazakhstani former professional ice hockey winger. He played for Sibir Novosibirsk, HC Lada Togliatti, Metallurg Novokuznetsk and Barys Astana.

He participated at the 2010 IIHF World Championship as a member of the Kazakhstan men's national ice hockey team.

Bumagin was selected by the Detroit Red Wings in the 8th round (260th overall) of the 2000 NHL entry draft.

== Career statistics ==
=== Regular season and playoffs ===
			Regular season					Playoffs
Season	Team	League	GP	G	A	Pts	PIM	GP	G	A	Pts	PIM
1997–98	Lada–2 Togliatti	RUS.3	7	0	0	0	2	—	—	—	—	—
1998–99	Lada–2 Togliatti	RUS.3	40	7	8	15	22	—	—	—	—	—
1999–2000	Lada–2 Togliatti	RUS.3	53	23	17	40	36	—	—	—	—	—
2000–01	Lada–2 Togliatti	RUS.3	10	3	2	5	4	—	—	—	—	—
2000–01	CSK VVS Samara	RUS.2	12	1	0	1	10	—	—	—	—	—
2000–01	Sokol Novocheboksarsk	RUS.3	2	0	2	2	2	—	—	—	—	—
2001–02	Lada–2 Togliatti	RUS.3	14	12	5	17	24	—	—	—	—	—
2001–02	Dizelist Penza	RUS.2	40	2	0	2	10	—	—	—	—	—
2002–03	Motor Barnaul	RUS.2	43	4	3	7	14	—	—	—	—	—
2002–03	Motor–2 Barnaul	RUS.3	2	0	0	0	6	—	—	—	—	—
2002–03	HC Belgorod	RUS.4	6	1	0	1	4	—	—	—	—	—
2003–04	Zauralie–2 Kurgan	RUS.3	2	1	1	2	2	—	—	—	—	—
2003–04	Kazakhmys Karagandy	KAZ	8	3	2	5	4	—	—	—	—	—
2003–04	Kazakhmys Karagandy	RUS.2	15	4	1	5	4	—	—	—	—	—
2004–05	Kazakhmys Karagandy	KAZ	26	9	17	26	18	—	—	—	—	—
2004–05	Kazakhmys Karagandy	RUS.2	48	10	16	26	26	—	—	—	—	—
2005–06	Kazakhmys Karagandy	KAZ	17	3	6	9	10	—	—	—	—	—
2005–06	Kazakhmys Karagandy	RUS.2	30	5	6	11	18	—	—	—	—	—
2005–06	Sibir Novosibirsk	RSL	5	1	0	1	2	—	—	—	—	—
2006–07	Lada Togliatti	RSL	24	1	3	4	10	—	—	—	—	—
2006–07	Lada–2 Togliatti	RUS.3	39	15	17	32	62	—	—	—	—	—
2007–08	Barys Astana	RUS.2	52	12	14	26	16	7	1	6	7	6
2008–09	Neftyanik Almetievsk	RUS.2	32	15	14	29	18	—	—	—	—	—
2008–09	Metallurg Novokuznetsk	KHL	21	2	2	4	12	—	—	—	—	—
2009–10	Metallurg Novokuznetsk	KHL	56	4	6	10	32	—	—	—	—	—
2010–11	Barys Astana	KHL	38	1	5	6	12	—	—	—	—	—
2010–11	Barys–2 Astana	KAZ	1	0	0	0	0	—	—	—	—	—
2011–12	Barys Astana	KHL	11	0	0	0	0	1	0	0	0	0
2011–12	Barys–2 Astana	KAZ	12	6	4	10	2	—	—	—	—	—
2012–13	Barys–2 Astana	KAZ	29	6	6	12	8	5	0	0	0	0
2013–14	Neftyanik Almetievsk	VHL	19	3	3	6	6	—	—	—	—	—
2014–15	Yermak Angarsk	VHL	2	0	0	0	0	—	—	—	—	—
2014–15	HK Almaty	KAZ	28	5	11	16	8	7	1	1	2	2
RUS.3 totals			169	61	52	113	160	—	—	—	—	—
RUS.2 & VHL totals			293	56	57	113	122	7	1	6	7	6
KHL totals			126	7	13	20	56	1	0	0	0	0

=== International ===
Year	Team	Event	GP	G	A	Pts	PIM
2010	Kazakhstan	WC	6	0	0	0	2
2011	Kazakhstan	AWG	4	1	4	5	0
2011	Kazakhstan	WC D1	5	2	1	3	2
2012	Kazakhstan	WC	7	0	0	0	6
Senior totals			22	3	5	8	10
