= Yōsuke Haga =

Japanese ice hockey player (born 1986)

- Born: September 5, 1986 (age 39) Kushiro, Hokkaidō, Japan
- Height: 5 ft 9 in (175 cm)
- Weight: 168 lb (76 kg; 12 st 0 lb)
- Position: Defenceman
- Shoots: Right
- Played for: Asia League; Oji Eagles
- National team: Japan
- Playing career: 2009–present

Yōsuke Haga
Medal record

Men's ice hockey

Representing Japan

Asian Games
| Silver medal – second place | 2011 Astana-Almaty | Ice hockey |

Yōsuke Haga (芳賀 陽介, Haga Yōsuke; born September 5, 1986) is a Japanese professional ice hockey defenceman who is currently playing for the Oji Eagles of the Asia League.

Since 2009 (the beginning of his professional career), he has been playing for the Oji Eagles. He previously played at university level for the Toyo University. He also has played for the Japan national team (junior and senior levels) since the year 2006.
