= Yōsuke Kon =

Japanese ice hockey player (born 1978)

- Born: September 21, 1978 (age 47) Kitahiroshima, Hokkaidō, Japan
- Height: 5 ft 11 in (180 cm)
- Weight: 176 lb (80 kg; 12 st 8 lb)
- Position: Center
- Shoots: Left
- Played for: Japan League; Seibu Tetsudo Tokyo; Asia League; Seibu Prince Rabbits; Oji Eagles; High1; Nippon Paper Cranes
- National team: Japan
- Playing career: 2001–present

Yōsuke Kon
Medal record

Men's ice hockey

Representing Japan

Asian Games
Gold medal – first place	2007 Changchun	Ice hockey
Silver medal – second place	2011 Astana-Almaty	Ice hockey

Yōsuke Kon (今洋祐) (born September 21, 1978) is a Japanese retired professional ice hockey center.

He played for the Seibu Tetsudo Tokyo between 2001 and 2003; for the Kokudo Tokyo/Seibu Prince Rabbits from 2000 to 2009; for the Oji Eagles from 2009 to 2013; High1 from 2013 to 2014; and the Nippon Paper Cranes between 2014 and 2016. He also played for the Japan national team from 2000 to 2011.
