= Talgat Zhailauov =

Kazakhstani ice hockey player

- Born: July 7, 1985 (age 41) Ust-Kamenogorsk, Kazakh SSR, Soviet Union
- Height: 5 ft 9 in (175 cm)
- Weight: 194 lb (88 kg; 13 st 12 lb)
- Position: Centre
- Shoots: Right
- KAZ team Former teams: Kazzinc-Torpedo; Barys Astana
- National team: Kazakhstan
- Playing career: 2002–present

Talgat Bakytbekuly Zhailauov (Kazakh: Талғат Бақытбекұлы Жайлауов, Talğat Baqytbekūly Jailauov; born July 7, 1985) is a Kazakhstani professional ice hockey forward, currently plays for Kazzinc-Torpedo of the Kazakhstan Hockey Championship (KAZ). He participated at the 2010 IIHF World Championship as a member of the Kazakhstan men's national ice hockey team.

== Playing career ==
Zhailauov played the first five seasons of his career with Kazzinc-Torpedo in the Supreme League of the Russian Ice Hockey Championship and Kazakhstan Hockey Championship. He had 35 goals and 63 points in 70 games with the team in 2006–07, and was signed by Barys Astana that offseason. He had 22 goals and 46 points with the team in the Supreme League during 2007–08, and helped the club earn a promotion to the Kontinental Hockey League in 2008.

== Career statistics ==
=== Regular season and playoffs ===
			Regular season					Playoffs
Season	Team	League	GP	G	A	Pts	PIM	GP	G	A	Pts	PIM
2002–03	Kazzinc-Torpedo	VHL	38	1	5	6	12	—	—	—	—	—
2003–04	Kazzinc-Torpedo	VHL	5	1	0	1	4	—	—	—	—	—
2003–04	Kazzinc-Torpedo	KAZ	4	0	1	1	6	—	—	—	—	—
2004–05	Kazzinc-Torpedo	VHL	36	5	8	13	35	—	—	—	—	—
2004–05	Kazzinc-Torpedo	KAZ	19	4	7	11	31	—	—	—	—	—
2005–06	Kazzinc-Torpedo	VHL	44	11	16	27	26	—	—	—	—	—
2005–06	Kazzinc-Torpedo	KAZ	18	6	3	9	16	—	—	—	—	—
2006–07	Kazzinc-Torpedo	VHL	52	18	23	41	42	—	—	—	—	—
2006–07	Kazzinc-Torpedo	KAZ	21	15	8	23	14	—	—	—	—	—
2007–08	Barys Astana	VHL	46	22	24	46	21	2	0	2	2	2
2008–09	Barys Astana	KHL	39	4	7	11	16	—	—	—	—	—
2009–10	Barys Astana	KHL	46	11	11	22	24	—	—	—	—	—
2010–11	Barys Astana	KHL	45	7	18	25	10	4	0	0	0	2
2011–12	Barys Astana	KHL	45	7	7	14	8	7	2	2	4	0
2012–13	Barys Astana	KHL	47	15	15	30	31	5	1	2	3	0
2013–14	Barys Astana	KHL	52	10	21	31	26	4	0	1	1	2
2014–15	Barys Astana	KHL	44	8	5	13	4	5	0	2	2	2
2015–16	Barys Astana	KHL	26	0	9	9	31	—	—	—	—	—
2016–17	Barys Astana	KHL	3	1	0	1	0	—	—	—	—	—
2016–17	Nomad Astana	KAZ	12	9	7	16	6	—	—	—	—	—
2016–17	Kazzinc-Torpedo	VHL	29	14	9	23	12	21	4	4	8	0
2017–18	Barys Astana	KHL	43	9	5	14	20	—	—	—	—	—
2017–18	Nomad Astana	KAZ	1	0	0	0	2	2	1	0	1	0
KHL totals			390	72	98	170	170	25	3	7	10	6

Medal record

Representing Kazakhstan

Ice hockey

Asian Winter Games
Silver medal – second place	2007 Changchun	Ice hockey
Gold medal – first place	2011 Astana-Almaty	Ice hockey

=== International ===
Year	Team	Event	GP	G	A	Pts	PIM
2001	Kazakhstan	WJC U18 D1	5	2	1	3	6
2002	Kazakhstan	WJC U18 D1	4	1	4	5	4
2002	Kazakhstan	WJC D1	5	2	1	3	2
2003	Kazakhstan	WJC U18	6	1	5	6	2
2004	Kazakhstan	WJC D1	5	0	1	1	10
2005	Kazakhstan	WJC D1	5	4	0	4	2
2006	Kazakhstan	WC	6	1	1	2	16
2007	Kazakhstan	AWG	5	10	8	18	0
2007	Kazakhstan	WC D1	4	1	2	3	2
2009	Kazakhstan	OGQ	3	4	1	5	29
2010	Kazakhstan	WC	6	0	0	0	0
2011	Kazakhstan	AWG	3	5	15	20	0
2011	Kazakhstan	WC D1	5	3	2	5	0
2012	Kazakhstan	WC	7	2	2	4	2
2013	Kazakhstan	OGQ	3	2	0	2	0
2013	Kazakhstan	WC D1A	5	3	2	5	4
2014	Kazakhstan	WC	7	1	1	2	4
2015	Kazakhstan	WC D1A	5	1	4	5	0
2019	Kazakhstan	WC D1A	5	1	3	4	0
2020	Kazakhstan	OGQ	3	3	2	5	0
Junior totals			30	10	12	22	26
Senior totals			67	37	43	80	57

== Awards and achievements ==
- Asian Winter Games Gold Medal - 2011
- KHL All-Star Game – 2014
