= Vadim Krasnoslobodtsev =

Kazakhstani ice hockey player

- Born: August 16, 1983 (age 42) Ust-Kamenogorsk, Kazakh SSR, Soviet Union
- Height: 6 ft 2 in (188 cm)
- Weight: 203 lb (92 kg; 14 st 7 lb)
- Position: Left wing
- Shot: Left
- Played for: Avangard Omsk; Mostovik Kurgan; Mechel Chelyabinsk; Amur Khabarovsk; Motor Barnaul; Neftekhimik Nizhnekamsk; Kazakhmys Satpaev; Barys Astana; Admiral Vladivostok; Torpedo Nizhny Novgorod; HSC Csíkszereda
- National team: Kazakhstan
- Playing career: 2001–2019

Medal record

Men's ice hockey

Representing Kazakhstan

Asian Games
Gold medal – first place	2011 Astana-Almaty	Ice hockey

Vadim Anatolyevich Krasnoslobodtsev (Russian: Вадим Анатольевич Краснослобо́дцев; born August 16, 1983) is a Kazakhstani former professional ice hockey forward who last played for HSC Csíkszereda of the Romanian Hockey League.

== Career statistics ==
			Regular season					Playoffs
Season	Team	League	GP	G	A	Pts	PIM	GP	G	A	Pts	PIM
1999–00	Avangard-VDV Omsk	Russia3	8	2	3	5	2	—	—	—	—	—
2000–01	Avangard-VDV Omsk	Russia3	35	1	2	3	8	—	—	—	—	—
2001–02	Avangard-VDV Omsk	Russia3	17	10	14	24	51	—	—	—	—	—
2001–02	Mostovik Kurgan	Russia2	14	0	1	1	2	—	—	—	—	—
2001–02	Mostovik Kurgan-2	Russia4	4	2	4	6	16	—	—	—	—	—
2002–03	Mostovik Kurgan	Russia2	42	2	6	8	10	—	—	—	—	—
2002–03	Mostovik Kurgan-2	Russia3	7	3	0	3	20	—	—	—	—	—
2003–04	Omskie Yastreby	Russia3	47	17	31	48	32	4	1	3	4	4
2003–04	Mechel Chelyabinsk	Russia2	1	0	0	0	0	—	—	—	—	—
2003–04	Mechel Chelyabinsk-2	Russia3	12	9	7	16	6	—	—	—	—	—
2004–05	Amur Khabarovsk	Russia2	35	5	10	15	34	5	0	0	0	4
2004–05	Amur Khabarovsk-2	Russia3	2	1	1	2	0	—	—	—	—	—
2005–06	Omskie Yastreby	Russia3	2	0	0	0	6	—	—	—	—	—
2005–06	Motor Barnaul	Russia2	48	15	22	37	56	3	2	1	3	2
2005–06	Motor Barnaul-2	Russia3	1	2	1	3	0	—	—	—	—	—
2006–07	HC Neftekhimik Nizhnekamsk	Russia	15	0	2	2	26	—	—	—	—	—
2006–07	HC Neftekhimik Nizhnekamsk-2	Russia3	27	21	23	44	16	—	—	—	—	—
2007–08	Kazakhmys Satpaev	Russia2	28	8	9	17	18	—	—	—	—	—
2007–08	Barys Astana	Russia2	22	8	10	18	39	7	4	3	7	4
2008–09	Barys Astana	KHL	53	12	24	36	48	3	0	0	0	0
2009–10	Barys Astana	KHL	42	9	12	21	30	1	1	1	1	25
2009–10	Barys Astana-2	Kazakhstan	1	0	2	2	0	—	—	—	—	—
2010–11	Barys Astana	KHL	50	13	10	23	18	4	0	0	0	0
2011–12	Barys Astana	KHL	49	5	9	14	16	—	—	—	—	—
2012–13	Barys Astana	KHL	37	9	16	25	19	7	1	4	5	0
2013–14	Torpedo Nizhny Novgorod	KHL	54	7	21	28	22	7	0	4	4	2
2014–15	Torpedo Nizhny Novgorod	KHL	48	15	2	17	14	5	1	0	1	0
2015–16	Barys Astana	KHL	54	9	11	20	22	—	—	—	—	—
2016–17	Admiral Vladivostok	KHL	53	5	14	19	14	6	2	1	3	2
2017–18	Admiral Vladivostok	KHL	30	7	5	12	12	—	—	—	—	—
2017–18	Torpedo Nizhny Novgorod	KHL	4	0	1	1	0	—	—	—	—	—
2018–19	HSC Csíkszereda	Erste Liga	10	2	10	12	0	15	6	6	12	6
2018–19	HSC Csíkszereda	Romania	10	5	8	13	0	7	1	3	4	0
KHL totals			474	91	125	216	215	33	5	9	14	29
