= Cho Min-ho =

South Korean ice hockey player (1987–2022)

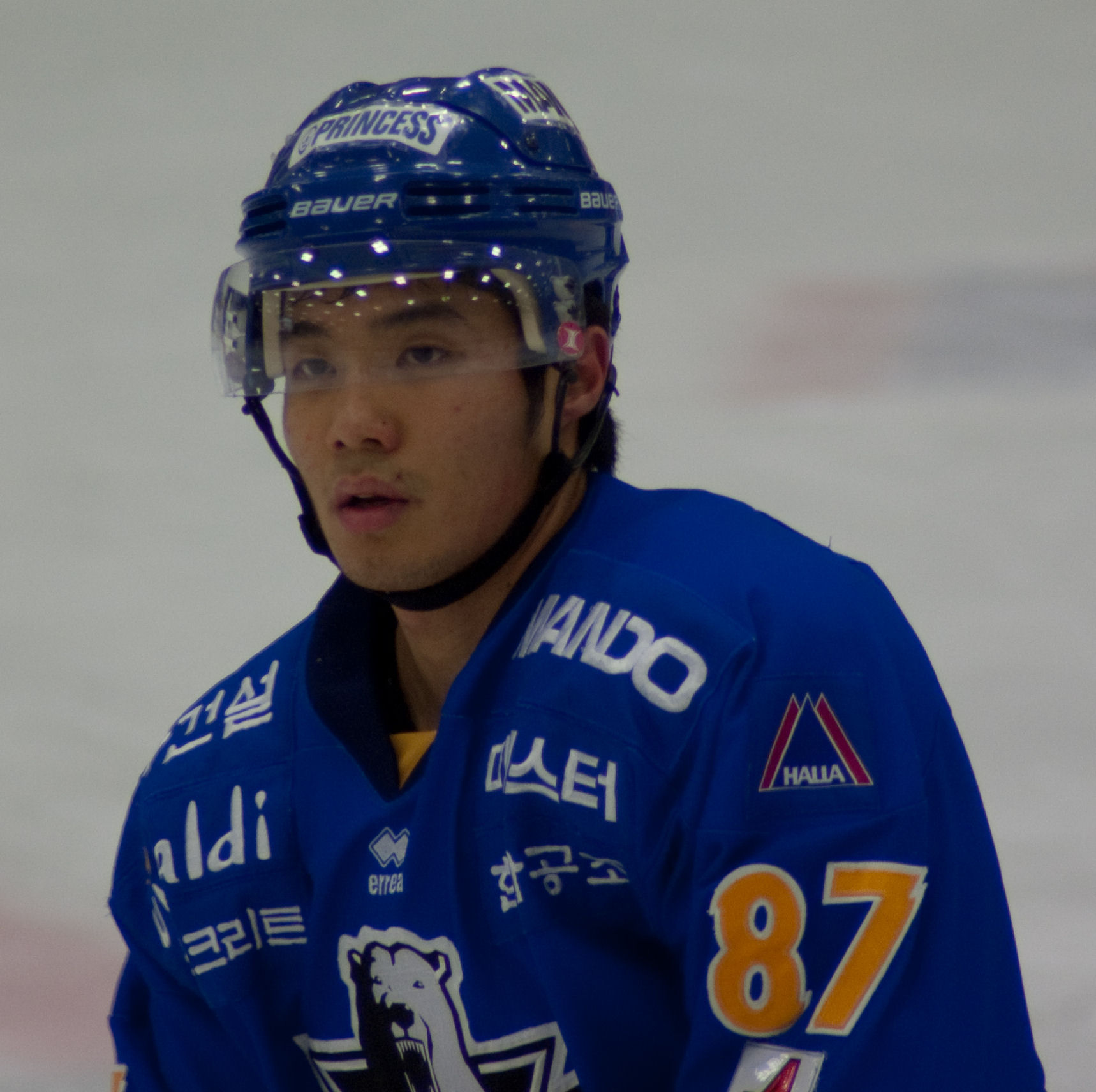
- Cho with Anyang Halla
- Born: 4 January 1987 Seoul, South Korea
- Died: 15 June 2022 (aged 35) Seoul, South Korea
- Height: 5 ft 9 in (175 cm)
- Weight: 178 lb (81 kg; 12 st 10 lb)
- Position: Centre
- Shot: Right
- Played for: Anyang Halla
- National team: South Korea
- Playing career: 2009–2021

Cho Min-ho
Medal record

Men's ice hockey

Representing South Korea

Asian Games
Bronze medal – third place	2011 Astana-Almaty	Ice hockey
Silver medal – second place	2017 Sapporo	Ice hockey

Cho Min-ho (Korean: 조민호, 4 January 1987 – 15 June 2022) was a South Korean professional ice hockey centre.

He played for Anyang Halla. Cho won the 2009–2010 Young Guy of the Year award.

Cho died from lung cancer in Seoul, on 15 June 2022, at the age of 35.
