= Kim Won-jung =

South Korean ice hockey player

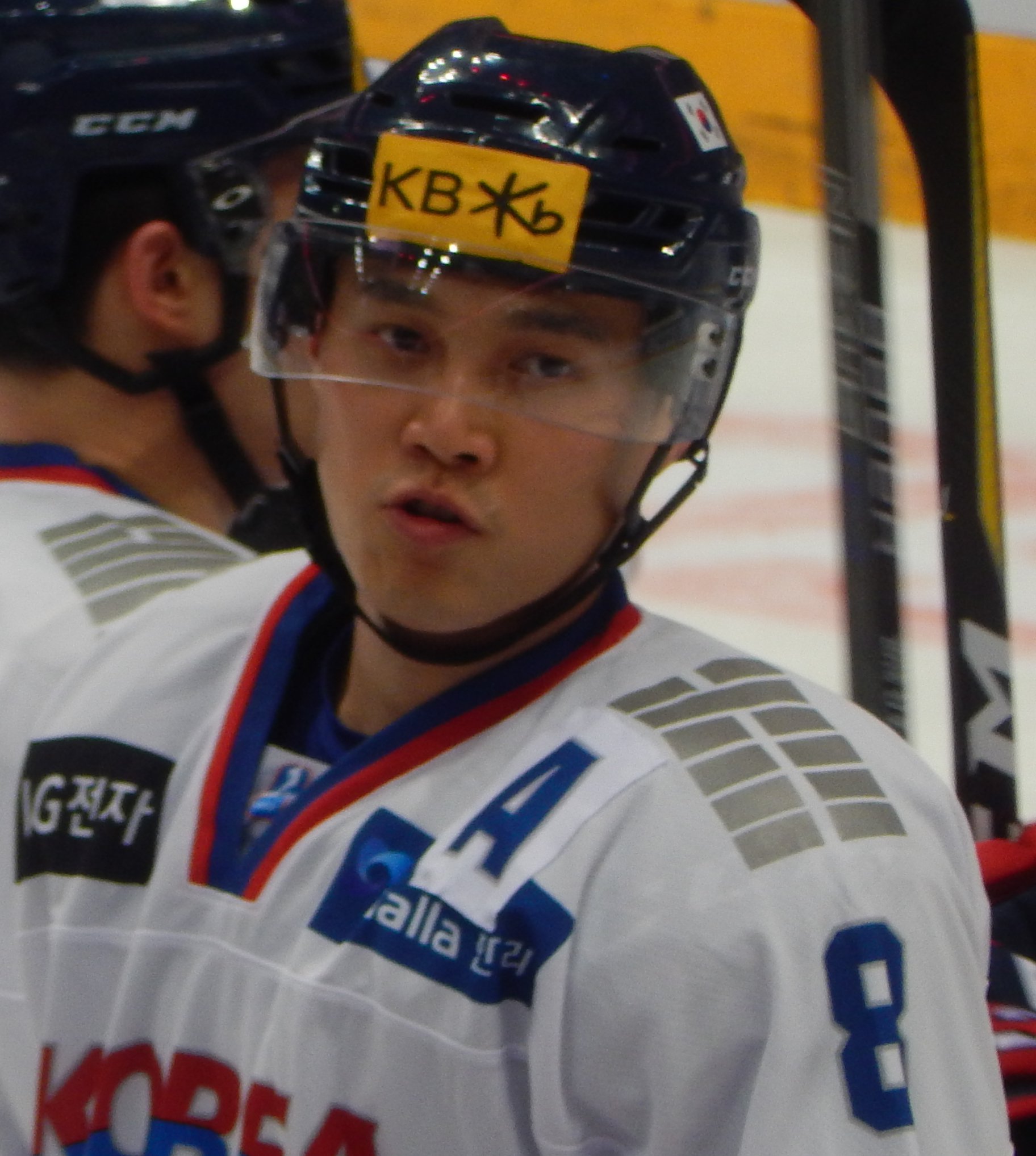
- 2017 Channel One Cup
- Born: December 18, 1984 (age 40); Seoul, South Korea
- Height: 5 ft 11 in (180 cm)
- Weight: 186 lb (84 kg; 13 st 4 lb)
- Position: Right wing
- Shot: Right
- Played for: Anyang Halla
- National team: South Korea
- Playing career: 2006–2019

Kim Won-jung
Medal record

Men's ice hockey

Representing South Korea

Asian Games
Silver medal – second place	2017 Sapporo	Ice hockey
Bronze medal – third place	2011 Astana-Almaty	Ice hockey

Kim Won-jung (Korean: 김원중 born December 18, 1984, in Seoul) is a retired Korean professional ice hockey right winger who played for Anyang Halla of the Asia League Ice Hockey (ALIH).
