= Takayuki Ono =

Japanese ice hockey player

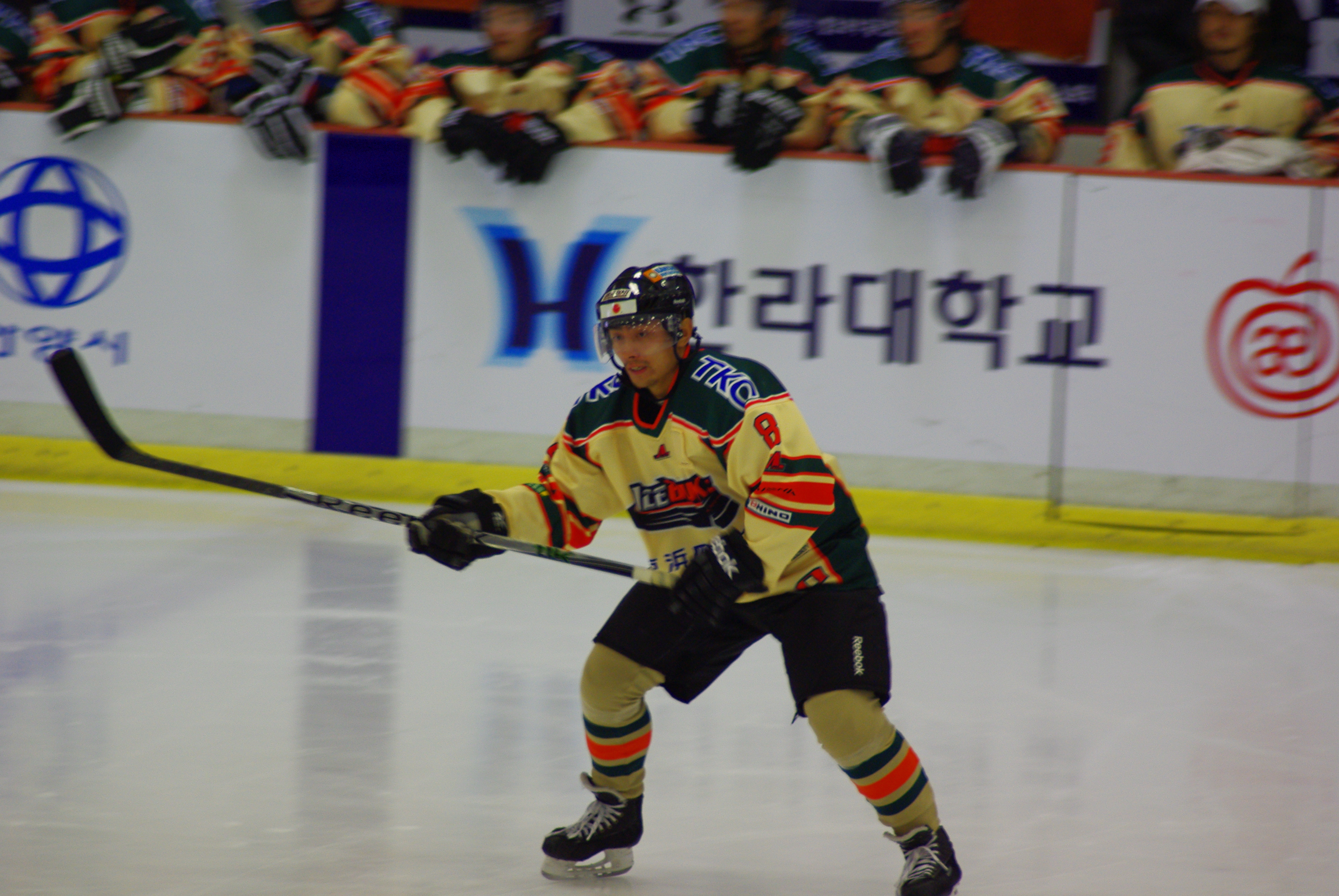
- Born: February 11, 1983 (age 43) Tomakomai, Japan
- Height: 5 ft 10 in (178 cm)
- Weight: 180 lb (82 kg; 12 st 12 lb)
- Position: Defence
- Shoots: Right
- Played for: ALH; HC Nikkō Ice Bucks; Anyang Halla
- Playing career: 2005–present

Takayuki Ono (尾野 貴之, Ono Takayuki; born February 11, 1983 in Tomakomai, Hokkaidō) is a Japanese ice hockey defenceman for the Nikkō Ice Bucks of the Asia League Ice Hockey. Ono debuted in Asia League with HC Nikkō Ice Bucks on 2005 and spent his first four season with the club.

In April 2009, Ono signed with Anyang Halla (Asia League) for a two-year deal. Ono becomes the third Japanese player in the club's history. Forwards Setaka Tetsuo (05-07’) and Sato Masakazu (07-08’) were the previous two Japanese natives, but Ono would be the first Japanese defenseman in team history.

After spending 2 years with Anyang Halla, where he won his first two championships, he returned to the Nikkō Ice Bucks for the 2011-2012 season.

== Career statistics ==
			Regular season					Playoffs
Season	Team	League	GP	G	A	Pts	PIM	GP	G	A	Pts	PIM
2005–06	HC Nikkō Ice Bucks	ALH	38	6	5	11	28	3	0	0	0	-
2006–07	HC Nikkō Ice Bucks	ALH	29	2	8	10	26	7	0	2	2	-
2007–08	HC Nikkō Ice Bucks	ALH	30	2	6	8	24	3	0	0	0	-
2008–09	HC Nikkō Ice Bucks	ALH	33	4	7	11	55	-	-	-	-	-
2009–10	Anyang Halla	ALH	36	3	11	14	10	8	1	0	1	4
2010–11	Anyang Halla	ALH	36	1	6	7	14	4	0	0	0	2
