= Masafumi Ogawa =

Japanese ice hockey player

- Born: January 14, 1983 (age 43) Tomakomai, Hokkaidō, JPN
- Height: 5 ft 9 in (175 cm)
- Weight: 168 lb (76 kg; 12 st 0 lb)
- Position: Forward
- Shot: Left
- Played for: Asia League; Oji Eagles
- National team: Japan
- Playing career: 2005–2015

Masafumi Ogawa
Medal record

Men's ice hockey

Representing Japan

Asian Games
Silver medal – second place	2011 Astana-Almaty	Ice hockey

Masafumi Ogawa (小川将史), born January 14, 1983, is a Japanese retired professional ice hockey forward.

He began his professional career in 2005, playing for the Oji Eagles of Asia League Ice Hockey and would spend his entire professional career with the team until his retirement in 2015. He also played for the Japan national team from 2005 to 2011.
