= Takahito Suzuki =

Japanese ice hockey player

- Born: August 17, 1975 (age 51) Tomakomai, Hokkaido, Japan
- Height: 5 ft 8 in (173 cm)
- Weight: 161 lb (73 kg; 11 st 7 lb)
- Position: Right wing
- Shot: Right
- Played for: ECHL; Charlotte Checkers; Japan Ice Hockey League; Kokudo Tokyo; Asia League; Seibu Prince Rabbits; Nikkō Ice Bucks
- National team: Japan
- Playing career: 1996–2013

Takahito Suzuki
Medal record

Men's ice hockey

Representing Japan

Asian Games
Gold medal – first place	2007 Changchun	Ice hockey
Silver medal – second place	2011 Astana-Almaty	Ice hockey

Takahito Suzuki (鈴木 貴人), born August 17, 1975, is a Japanese retired professional ice hockey Right winger. He also served as the head coach of the Japanese national team. Suzuki is noted for being the first Japanese ice hockey player to play for a professional team in the United States. A fan favorite, the Charlotte Checkers placed billboards around the city promoting Suzuki.
