= Makoto Kawashima =

Japanese ice hockey player

- Born: May 2, 1979 (age 46) Obihiro, Hokkaido, Japan
- Height: 5 ft 10 in (178 cm)
- Weight: 181 lb (82 kg; 12 st 13 lb)
- Position: Defenceman
- Shot: Left
- Played for: Oji Eagles
- National team: Japan
- Playing career: 2000–2014

Makoto Kawashima
Medal record

Men's ice hockey

Representing Japan

Asian Games
Silver medal – second place	2011 Astana-Almaty	Ice hockey

Makoto Kawashima (川島 誠), born May 2, 1979, is a Japanese retired professional ice hockey Defenceman who spent his entire professional career with the Oji Eagles in the Japan Ice Hockey League and later in Asia League Ice Hockey. He also played for the Japan national team in five Ice Hockey World Championships.
