= Maxim Khudyakov =

Kazakhstani ice hockey player

- Born: August 18, 1986 (age 38); Ust-Kamenogorsk, Kazakh SSR, USSR
- Height: 5 ft 7 in (170 cm)
- Weight: 165 lb (75 kg; 11 st 11 lb)
- Position: Center
- Shoots: Left
- VHL team Former teams: Saryarka Karagandy; Kazakhmys Karagandy; Gornyak Rudny; Barys Astana
- National team: Kazakhstan
- Playing career: 2003–present

Maxim Khudyakov (born August 18, 1986) is a Kazakhstani professional ice hockey forward who has played for the Saryarka Karagandy team in the Higher Hockey League.
