= Masato Domeki =

Japanese ice hockey player

- Born: December 29, 1983 (age 42) Eniwa, Hokkaidō, JPN
- Height: 5 ft 9 in (175 cm)
- Weight: 174 lb (79 kg; 12 st 6 lb)
- Position: Forward
- Shoots: Right
- Played for: Asia League; Hokkaido Red Eagles
- National team: Japan
- Playing career: 2003–present

Masato Domeki
Medal record

Men's ice hockey

Representing Japan

Asian Games
Gold medal – first place	2007 Changchun	Ice hockey
Silver medal – second place	2011 Astana-Almaty	Ice hockey

Masato Domeki (百目木政人), born December 29, 1983, is a Japanese professional ice hockey forward currently playing for the Hokkaido Red Eagles of the Asia League.

Since 2003 he plays for the Hokkaido Red Eagles (formerly Oji Eagles). He also played in the Japan national team at junior level in 2003, and currently, for the seniors national team (since 2006).
