= Takafumi Yamashita =

Japanese ice hockey player

- Born: November 11, 1987 (age 38) Tomakomai, Hokkaidō, Japan
- Height: 5 ft 10 in (178 cm)
- Weight: 168 lb (76 kg; 12 st 0 lb)
- Position: Defenceman
- Shoots: Right
- Played for: Asia League; Oji Eagles
- National team: Japan
- Playing career: 2006–present

Takafumi Yamashita
Medal record

Men's ice hockey

Representing Japan

Asian Games
Silver medal – second place	2011 Astana-Almaty	Ice hockey

Takafumi Yamashita (山下敬史), born November 11, 1987, is a Japanese professional ice hockey Defenceman currently playing for the Oji Eagles of the Asia League.

Since 2006 (the beginning of his professional career), he plays for the Oji Eagles. He also has played for the senior Japan national team since 2010.
