= Takeshi Saito (ice hockey) =

Japanese ice hockey player

Takeshi Saitō
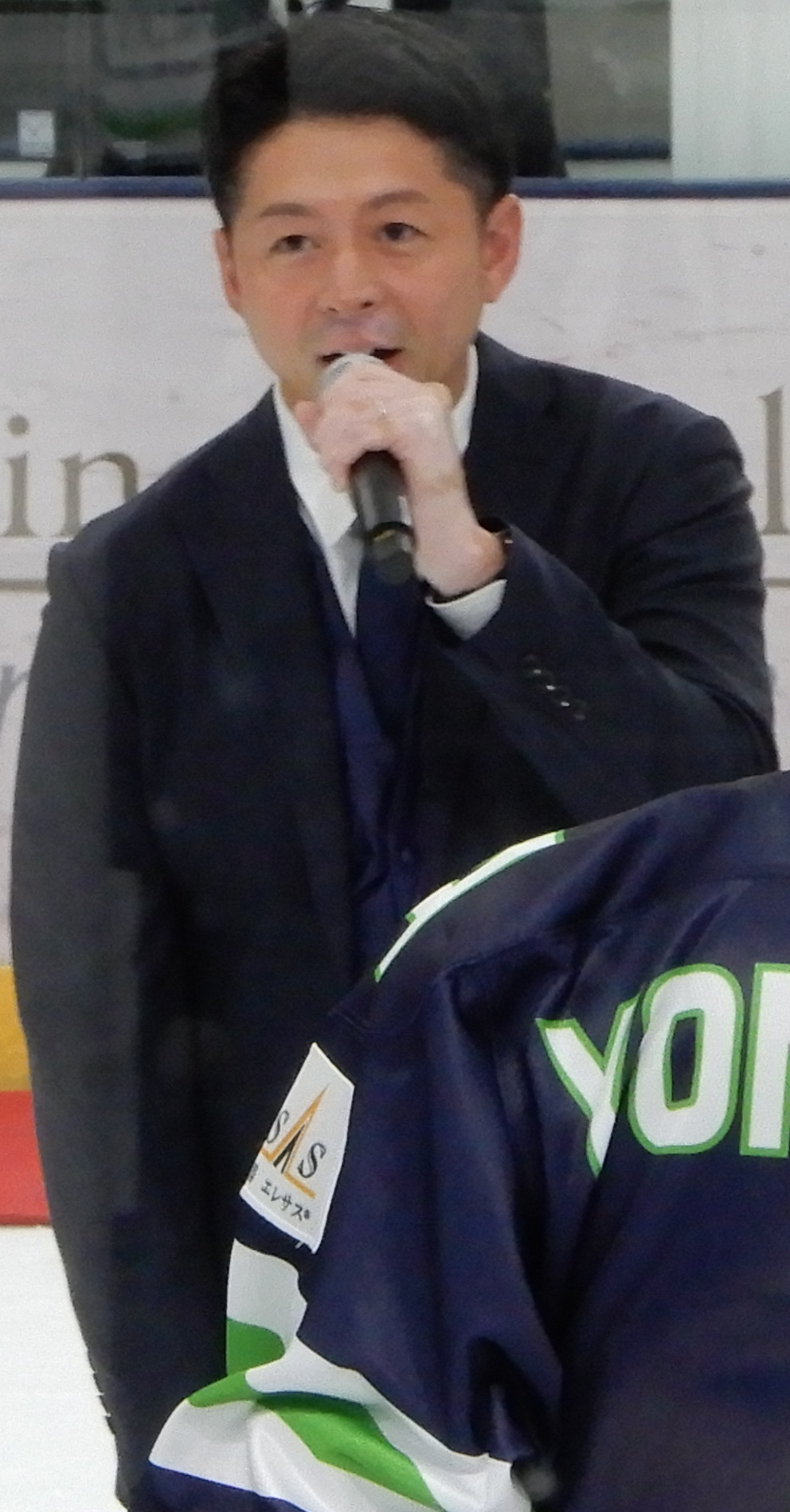
- Born: March 8, 1981 (age 45) Kushiro, Hokkaido, Japan
- Height: 1.76 m (5 ft 9 in)
- Weight: 80 kg (176 lb; 12 st 8 lb)
- Position: Forward
- Shoots: Right
- ALIH team Former teams: East Hokkaido Cranes; Japan Ice Hockey League; Sapporo Polaris; Asia League; Oji Eagles; Nikkō Ice Bucks
- National team: Japan
- Playing career: 1999–present

Takeshi Saito
Medal record

Men's ice hockey

Representing Japan

Asian Games
Gold medal – first place	2007 Changchun	Ice hockey
Silver medal – second place	2011 Astana-Almaty	Ice hockey

Takeshi Saito (齊藤 毅, Saitō Takeshi; born March 8, 1981) is a Japanese professional ice hockey forward currently playing for East Hokkaido Cranes of the Asia League.

He played one season in the Japan League's now defunct team, the Sapporo Polaris. He also played in the Japan national team in every major tournament they have played since 2003.

From 1999 to 2001, he played for the Snow Brand Sapporo. From 2001 to 2002, he played for the Sapporo Polaris. From 2002 to 2003, he played for the Oji Seishi. From 2003 to 2014, he played for the Oji Eagles. He then played for the Nikkō Ice Bucks from 2014 to 2019.
