= Hideyuki Osawa =

Japanese ice hockey player (born 1979)

- Born: January 5, 1979 (age 46); Tomakomai, Hokkaidō, Japan
- Height: 1.76 m (5 ft 9 in)
- Weight: 80 kg (176 lb; 12 st 8 lb)
- Position: Defenceman
- Shot: Right
- Played for: Nippon Paper Cranes
- National team: Japan
- Playing career: 2001–2016

Hideyuki Osawa
Medal record

Men's ice hockey

Representing Japan

Asian Games
Gold medal – first place	2007 Changchun	Ice hockey
Silver medal – second place	2011 Astana-Almaty	Ice hockey

Hideyuki Osawa (大澤 秀之, Ōsawa Hideyuki; born January 5, 1979) is a Japanese former professional ice hockey defenceman.

Throughout the entirety of his professional career, Osawa played for the Nippon Paper Cranes of Asia League Ice Hockey, from 2001 until his retirement in 2016. He also played for the Japan national team from 2005 to 2011.
