= Shinya Yanadori =

Japanese ice hockey player

- Born: December 15, 1986 (age 39) Kushiro, Hokkaidō, Japan
- Height: 1.77 m (5 ft 10 in)
- Weight: 77 kg (170 lb; 12 st 2 lb)
- Position: Defence
- Shoots: Left
- DEN team: Esbjerg Energy
- National team: Japan
- Playing career: 2006–present

Shinya Yanadori
Medal record

Men's ice hockey

Representing Japan

Asian Games
| Gold medal – first place | 2007 Changchun | Ice hockey |
| Silver medal – second place | 2011 Astana-Almaty | Ice hockey |

Shinya Yanadori (梁取 慎也, Yanadori Shin'ya; born December 15, 1986) is a Japanese professional ice hockey defenceman currently playing for the Nippon Paper Cranes in the Asia League.

Yanadori has played for the Nippon Paper Cranes since 2009. He previously played at amateur level for the Komazawa Tomakomai team and for Meiji University. He has also played in the senior Japan national team since 2006.
