= Masahito Suzuki (ice hockey) =

Japanese ice hockey player

- Born: December 7, 1983 (age 42) Tomakomai, Hokkaidō, Japan
- Height: 1.73 m (5 ft 8 in)
- Weight: 77 kg (170 lb; 12 st 2 lb)
- Position: Forward
- Shot: Right
- team Former teams: Free agent Oji Eagles; Tohoku Free Blades; Watertown Privateers; China Dragon; Anyang Halla
- National team: Japan
- Playing career: 2006–2018
Medal record
Men's ice hockey
Representing Japan
Asian Games
| Silver medal – second place | 2011 Astana-Almaty | Ice hockey |

Masahito Suzuki (鈴木 雅仁, Suzuki Masahito; born December 7, 1983) is a Japanese former professional ice hockey forward.

== Career ==
Suzuki played for the Tohoku Free Blades between 2009 and 2014. He previously played for the Oji Eagles for three seasons and was a member of the senior Japan national team.
