= Shin Sang-woo (ice hockey) =

South Korean ice hockey player

Sin Sang-woo
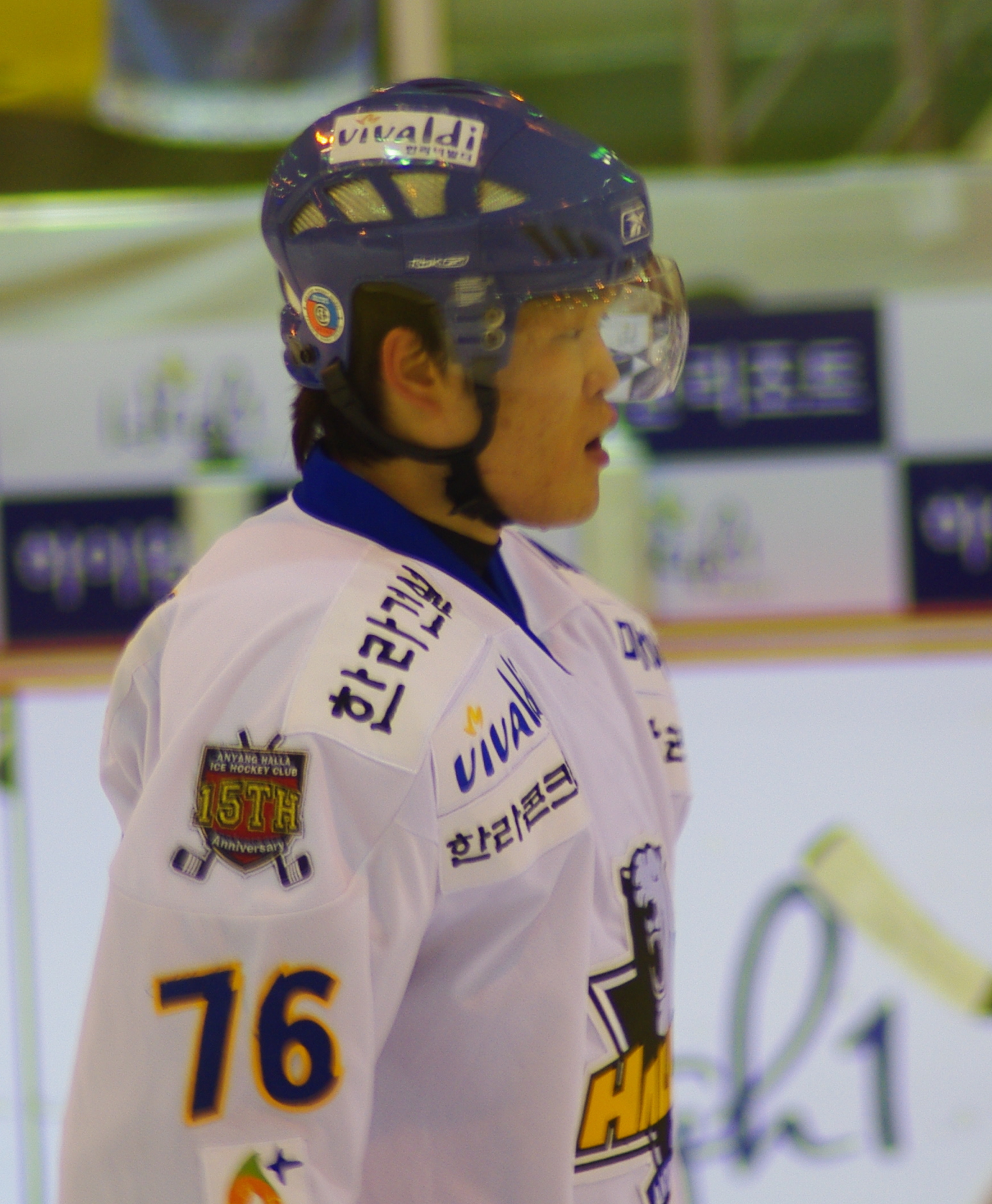
- Born: December 12, 1987 (age 38) Seoul, South Korea
- Height: 5 ft 9 in (175 cm)
- Weight: 178 lb (81 kg; 12 st 10 lb)
- Position: Winger
- Shoots: Left
- ALH team Former teams: Anyang Halla; Daemyung Sangmu
- National team: South Korea
- Playing career: 2010–present

Sin Sang-woo (Korean: 신상우 born December 12, 1987, in Seoul) is a South Korean professional ice hockey winger. He is currently playing for Anyang Halla of Asia League Ice Hockey (ALIH).
