= Shuhei Kuji =

Japanese ice hockey player (born 1987)

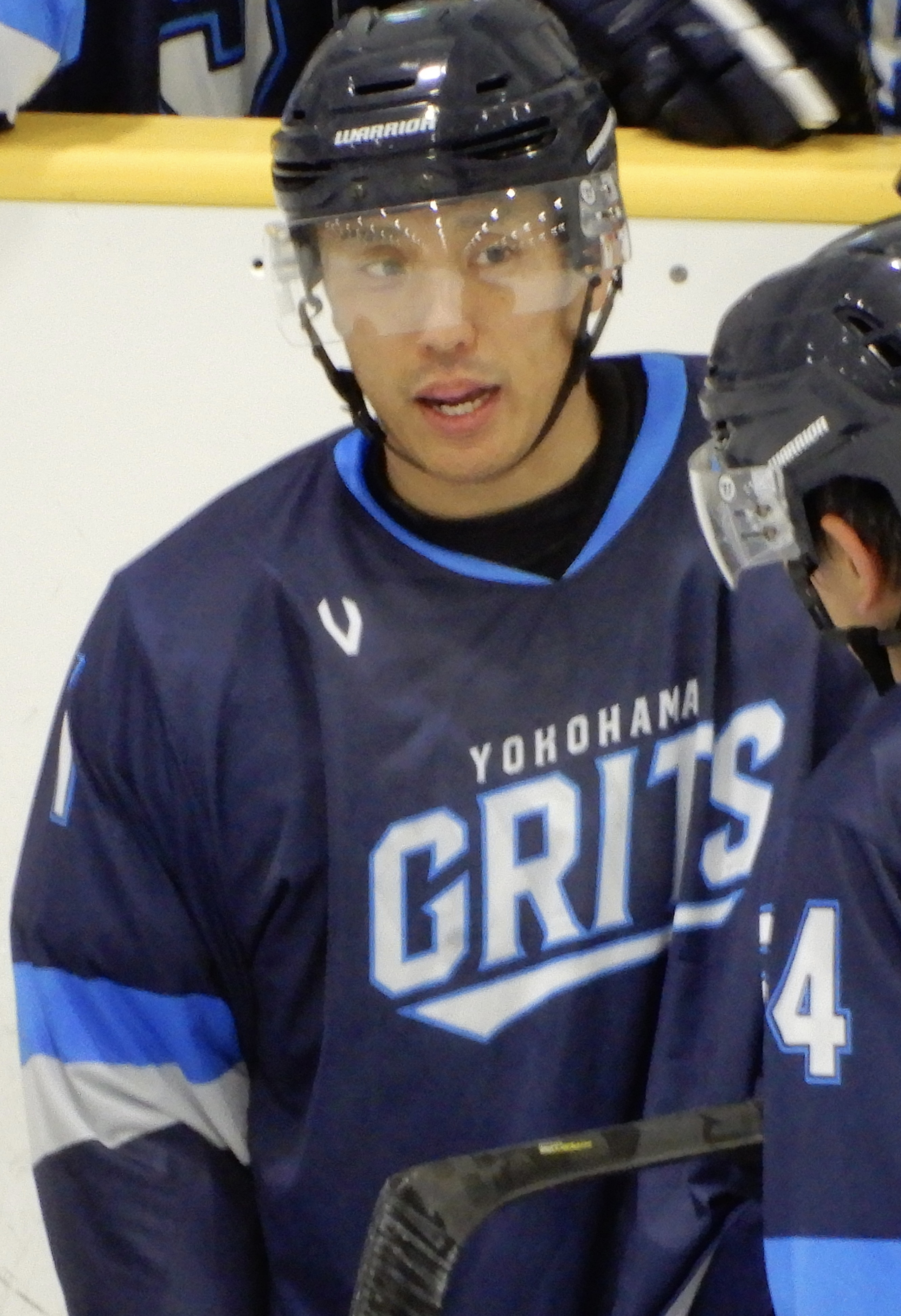
- Shuhei Kuji
- Born: April 27, 1987 (age 38) Tomakomai, Japan
- Height: 5 ft 7 in (170 cm)
- Weight: 172 lb (78 kg; 12 st 4 lb)
- Position: Forward
- Shoots: Right
- ALIH team Former teams: Oji Eagles; Eisbären Berlin
- National team: Japan
- Playing career: 2010–present

Medal record

Men's ice hockey

Representing Japan

Asian Games
Silver medal – second place	2011 Astana-Almaty	

Shuhei Kuji (久慈 修平, Kuji Shūhei; born April 27, 1987) is a Japanese professional ice hockey forward who is currently playing for the Oji Eagles in the Asia League Ice Hockey.

== Playing career ==
Kuji attended and previously played at university level for Waseda University. He made his professional debut in the Asia League Ice Hockey with the Oji Eagles in 2010. After five seasons with the Eagles, having recorded a dominant season in 2014–15 with 61 points in just 39 games, Kuji opted to test himself in Europe, securing a try-out contract with top level German club Eisbären Berlin on July 15, 2015.

Kuji enjoyed a successful pre-season in Germany and on September 9, 2015, it was announced that Kuji had secured a one-year contract to remain for the season with Eisbären Berlin. He had two assists and no goals in 37 DEL games over the 2015–16 season. Kuji scored his only goal for the Eisbären squad in one of his four appearances in the Champions Hockey League. He did not have his contract renewed after the conclusion of the season.

He has also played and has been a current member on the Japan national team since 2009.
