= 2012–13 Barys Astana season =

KHL team season

2012–13 Barys Astana
- Division: 3rd Chernyshev
- Conference: 6th Eastern
- 2012–13 record: 23–18–5–6
- Home record: 15–7–2–1
- Road record: 8–11–3–5
- Goals for: 175
- Goals against: 161

Team information
- President: Vadim Shakshakbayev
- General manager: Vadim Guseinov
- Coach: Vladimir Krikunov
- Captain: Dmitri Upper
- Alternate captains: Vitali Novopashin; Konstantin Rudenko
- Arena: Kazakhstan Sports Palace
- Average attendance: 3,189 (57,6%) (Total: 89,292)

Team leaders
- Goals: Brandon Bochenski (20)
- Assists: Victor Hedman (21)
- Points: Brandon Bochenski (40)
- Penalty minutes: Alexei Litvinenko (77)
- Plus/minus: (+): Victor Hedman (+18) (−): Mikhail Grigoriev (-15)
- Wins: Vitali Yeremeyev (12)
- Goals against average: Teemu Lassila (2.71)

The 2012–13 Barys Astana season was the Kontinental Hockey League franchise's 5th season of play and 14th season overall.

== Standings ==
=== Division standings ===
Source: Kontinental Hockey League.

R		GP	W	OTW	SOW	SOL	OTL	L	GF	GA	Pts
1	Avangard Omsk	52	26	6	3	4	2	11	149	121	102
2	Salavat Yulaev Ufa	52	24	2	3	6	0	17	148	140	88
3	Barys Astana	52	23	3	2	2	4	18	175	161	85
4	Sibir Novosibirsk	52	21	1	5	4	3	17	124	119	84
5	Metallurg Novokuznetsk	52	15	3	1	3	2	28	132	177	58
6	Amur Khabarovsk	52	11	1	4	1	0	35	115	167	44

=== Conference standings ===
Source: Kontinental Hockey League.

R		Div	GP	W	OTW	SOW	SOL	OTL	L	GF	GA	Pts
1	Ak Bars Kazan	KHA	52	28	1	5	5	3	10	157	112	104
2	Avangard Omsk	CHE	52	26	6	3	4	2	11	149	121	102
3	Traktor Chelyabinsk	KHA	52	28	0	3	6	2	13	152	120	98
4	Metallurg Magnitogorsk	KHA	52	27	0	0	7	5	13	167	121	93
5	Salavat Yulaev Ufa	CHE	52	24	2	3	6	0	17	148	140	88
6	Barys Astana	CHE	52	23	3	2	2	4	18	175	161	85
7	Sibir Novosibirsk	CHE	52	21	1	5	4	3	17	124	119	84
8	Neftekhimik Nizhnekamsk	KHA	52	17	5	5	4	2	19	144	150	77
9	Yugra Khanty-Mansiysk	KHA	52	19	4	3	3	0	23	153	163	74
10	Metallurg Novokuznetsk	CHE	52	15	3	1	3	2	28	132	177	58
11	Amur Khabarovsk	CHE	52	11	1	4	1	0	35	115	167	44
12	Avtomobilist Yekaterinburg	KHA	52	7	0	1	7	5	32	104	180	35

Divisions: KHA – Kharlamov Division, CHE – Chernyshev Division

== Schedule and results ==
=== Regular season ===
2012-13 Game Log
September: 4–5–0–2 (Home: 2–2–0–1; Road: 2–3–0–1) Pts. 14

Game	Date	Opponent	Score	Decision	Location	Attendance	Record	Points	Recap
1	September 6	Dynamo Moscow	1-5	Teemu Lassila	Luzhniki Minor Arena	3,053	0-1-0-0	0	
2	September 8	SKA Saint Petersburg	3-7	Pavel Poluektov	Ice Palace Saint Petersburg	11,000	0-2-0-0	0	
3	September 10	Avangard Omsk	4-5 (OT)	Pavel Poluektov	Omsk Arena	7,230	0-2-0-1	1	
4	September 13	Ak Bars Kazan	1-3	Pavel Poluektov	Kazakhstan Sports Palace	3,923	0-3-0-1	1	
5	September 15	Salavat Yulaev Ufa	3-2	Pavel Poluektov	Kazakhstan Sports Palace	4,012	1-3-0-1	4	
6	September 17	Neftekhimik Nizhnekamsk	2-3 (OT)	Vitali Yeremeyev	Kazakhstan Sports Palace	3,726	1-3-0-2	5	
7	September 20	CSKA Moscow	3-1	Vitali Yeremeyev	CSKA Ice Palace	2,061	2-3-0-2	8	
8	September 22	Lev Prague	4-2	Vitali Yeremeyev	Tipsport Arena	4,713	3-3-0-2	11	
9	September 24	Slovan Bratislava	2-4	Teemu Lassila	Ondrej Nepela Arena	10,055	3-4-0-2	11	
10	September 27	Sibir Novosibirsk	2-1	Vitali Yeremeyev	Kazakhstan Sports Palace	3,171	4-4-0-2	14	
11	September 29	Metallurg Novokuznetsk	1-5	Vitali Yeremeyev	Kazakhstan Sports Palace	3,135	4-5-0-2	14	

October: 5–3–0–3 (Home: 4–1–0–0; Road: 1–2–0–3) Pts. 18

Game	Date	Opponent	Score	Decision	Location	Attendance	Record	Points	Recap
12	October 1	Amur Khabarovsk	3-1	Teemu Lassila	Kazakhstan Sports Palace	2,250	5-5-0-2	17	
13	October 6	Atlant Moscow Oblast	3-1	Teemu Lassila	Mytishchi Arena	5,900	6-5-0-2	20	
14	October 8	Lokomotiv Yaroslavl	2-4	Teemu Lassila	Arena 2000	8,213	6-6-0-2	20	
15	October 10	Torpedo Nizhny Novgorod	4-5	Teemu Lassila	Trade Union Sport Palace	5,500	6-7-0-2	20	
16	October 13	Spartak Moscow	5-1	Teemu Lassila	Kazakhstan Sports Palace	3,225	7-7-0-2	23	
17	October 15	Dinamo Riga	5-0	Teemu Lassila	Kazakhstan Sports Palace	2,467	8-7-0-2	26	
18	October 17	Donbass Donetsk	6-1	Teemu Lassila	Kazakhstan Sports Palace	2,684	9-7-0-2	29	
19	October 22	Vityaz Chekhov	2-3 (SO)	Teemu Lassila	Ice Hockey Center 2004	2,800	9-7-0-3	30	
20	October 24	Severstal Cherepovets	2-3 (SO)	Vitali Yeremeyev	Ice Palace Cherepovets	3,526	9-7-0-4	31	
21	October 26	Dinamo Minsk	1-2 (OT)	Vitali Yeremeyev	Minsk-Arena	15,000	9-7-0-5	32	
22	October 31	Avangard Omsk	3-5	Teemu Lassila	Kazakhstan Sports Palace	4,072	9-8-0-5	32	

November: 3–3–1–1 (Home: 2–2–0–0; Road: 1–1–1–1) Pts. 12

Game	Date	Opponent	Score	Decision	Location	Attendance	Record	Points	Recap
23	November 14	Traktor Chelyabinsk	3-6	Vitali Yeremeyev	Kazakhstan Sports Palace	3,077	9-9-0-5	32	
24	November 16	Avtomobilist Yekaterinburg	7-2	Teemu Lassila	Kazakhstan Sports Palace	2,154	10-9-0-5	35	
25	November 18	Metallurg Magnitogorsk	3-5	Teemu Lassila	Kazakhstan Sports Palace	4,071	10-10-0-5	35	
26	November 21	Traktor Chelyabinsk	3-0	Teemu Lassila	Traktor Ice Arena	7,350	11-10-0-5	38	
27	November 23	Metallurg Magnitogorsk	1-5	Teemu Lassila	Magnitogorsk Arena	5,231	11-11-0-5	38	
28	November 25	Avtomobilist Yekaterinburg	5–4 (OT)	Teemu Lassila	Yekaterinburg Sports Palace	3,350	11-11-1-5	40	
29	November 27	Ugra Khanty-Mansiysk	6–2	Teemu Lassila	Kazakhstan Sports Palace	2,612	12-11-1-5	43	
30	November 30	Avangard Omsk	2–3 (OT)	Teemu Lassila	Omsk Arena	8,120	12-11-1-6	44	

December: 4–1–4–0 (Home: 3–0–2–0; Road: 1–1–2–0) Pts. 20

Game	Date	Opponent	Score	Decision	Location	Attendance	Record	Points	Recap
31	December 3	Vityaz Chekhov	3–5	Pavel Poluektov	Ice Hockey Center 2004	3,723	12-12-1-6	44	
32	December 5	Severstal Cherepovets	3–0	Vitali Yeremeyev	Kazakhstan Sports Palace	2,176	13-12-1-6	47	
33	December 7	Dinamo Minsk	7–2	Vitali Yeremeyev	Kazakhstan Sports Palace	2,716	14-12-1-6	50	
34	December 19	Dinamo Riga	3–2 (OT)	Vitali Yeremeyev	Arena Riga	4,250	14-12-2-6	52	
35	December 21	Donbass Donetsk	4–2	Vitali Yeremeyev	Druzhba Arena	3,556	15-12-2-6	55	
36	December 23	Spartak Moscow	2–1 (SO)	Teemu Lassila	Sokolniki Arena	2,846	15-12-3-6	57	
37	December 26	Atlant Moscow Oblast	5–4 (SO)	Vitali Yeremeyev	Kazakhstan Sports Palace	2,717	15-12-4-6	59	
38	December 28	Lokomotiv Yaroslavl	2–0	Vitali Yeremeyev	Kazakhstan Sports Palace	2,817	16-12-4-6	62	
39	December 30	Torpedo Nizhny Novgorod	5–4 (OT)	Vitali Yeremeyev	Kazakhstan Sports Palace	3,040	16-12-5-6	64	

January: 4–6–0–0 (Home: 1–2–0–0; Road: 3–4–0–0) Pts. 12

Game	Date	Opponent	Score	Decision	Location	Attendance	Record	Points	Recap
40	January 5	Amur Khabarovsk	4–5	Vitali Yeremeyev	Platinum Arena	7,100	16-13-5-6	64	
41	January 7	Metallurg Novokuznetsk	8–6	Pavel Poluektov	Kuznetsk Metallurgists Arena	2,800	17-13-5-6	67	
42	January 9	Sibir Novosibirsk	1–3	Vitali Yeremeyev	Ice Sports Palace Sibir	5,500	17-14-5-6	67	
43	January 15	Ugra Khanty-Mansiysk	4–6	Pavel Poluektov	Arena Ugra	2,840	17-15-5-6	67	
44	January 18	CSKA Moscow	1–8	Pavel Poluektov	Kazakhstan Sports Palace	3,887	17-16-5-6	67	
45	January 20	Lev Prague	5–1	Pavel Poluektov	Kazakhstan Sports Palace	2,737	18-16-5-6	70	
46	January 22	Slovan Bratislava	2–4	Pavel Poluektov	Kazakhstan Sports Palace	2,779	18-17-5-6	70	
47	January 26	Salavat Yulaev Ufa	6–4	Pavel Poluektov	Ufa Arena	7,950	19-17-5-6	73	
48	January 28	Ak Bars Kazan	4–2	Pavel Poluektov	TatNeft Arena	3,330	20-17-5-6	76	
49	January 30	Neftekhimik Nizhnekamsk	1–2	Pavel Poluektov	Neftekhimik Ice Palace	5,000	20-18-5-6	76	

February: 3–0–0–0 (Home: 3–0–0–0; Road: 0–0–0–0) Pts. 9

Game	Date	Opponent	Score	Decision	Location	Attendance	Record	Points	Recap
50	February 1	Avangard Omsk	5–4	Vitali Yeremeyev	Kazakhstan Sports Palace	4,022	21-18-5-6	79	
51	February 13	Dynamo Moscow	4–2	Vitali Yeremeyev	Kazakhstan Sports Palace	3,717	22-18-5-6	82	
52	February 17	SKA Saint Petersburg	5–4	Vitali Yeremeyev	Kazakhstan Sports Palace	4,017	23-18-5-6	85	

Win (3 points) Overtime/shootout win (2 points) Overtime/shootout loss (1 point) Loss (0 points)

=== Playoffs ===
2013 Gagarin Cup Playoffs
Eastern Conference Quarter-finals - #6 Barys vs. #3 Traktor – Traktor won series 4–3

Game	Date	Opponent	Score	Decision	Location	Attendance	Series	Recap
1	February 21	Traktor Chelyabinsk	4–3 (OT)	Vitali Yeremeyev	Traktor Ice Arena	7,450	1-0	
2	February 22	Traktor Chelyabinsk	5–3	Vitali Yeremeyev	Traktor Ice Arena	6,800	2-0	
3	February 25	Traktor Chelyabinsk	1–3	Vitali Yeremeyev	Kazakhstan Sports Palace	4,072	2-1	
4	February 26	Traktor Chelyabinsk	2–3	Vitali Yeremeyev	Kazakhstan Sports Palace	4,072	2-2	
5	March 1	Traktor Chelyabinsk	3–6	Vitali Yeremeyev	Traktor Ice Arena	7,500	2-3	
6	March 3	Traktor Chelyabinsk	4–2	Pavel Poluektov	Kazakhstan Sports Palace	3,574	3-3	
7	March 5	Traktor Chelyabinsk	3–5	Pavel Poluektov	Traktor Ice Arena	7,500	3-4	

Win Loss

== Player statistics ==
Source: Kontinental Hockey League.

=== Skaters ===
Regular season
Player	GP	G	A	Pts	+/-	PIM
Brandon Bochenski	48	20	20	40	4	22
Nigel Dawes	51	20	14	34	10	28
Dustin Boyd	51	15	16	31	9	10
Konstantin Rudenko	47	14	17	31	2	65
Talgat Zhailauov	47	15	15	30	1	31
Vadim Krasnoslobodtsev	37	9	16	25	11	19
Dmitri Upper	51	12	10	22	1	38
Victor Hedman	26	1	21	22	18	70
Roman Starchenko	41	13	8	21	0	4
Roman Savchenko	50	10	10	20	9	18
Maxim Spiridonov	38	9	9	18	1	50
Alexei Litvinenko	52	6	11	17	3	77
Nik Antropov	26	3	14	17	2	39
Fedor Polishchuk	41	4	12	16	-3	14
Andrew Hutchinson	40	2	12	14	1	22
Vitali Novopashin	43	0	12	12	12	26
Andrei Gavrilin	32	5	5	10	1	16
Konstantin Pushkaryov	28	4	6	10	-6	42
Viktor Alexandrov	25	5	2	7	-10	8
Mikhail Rakhmanov	23	2	5	7	4	4
Mikhail Grigoriev	50	1	6	7	-15	48
Ilya Solaryov	32	1	4	5	-2	12
Alexei Troschinsky	6	0	3	3	4	4
Ryan McDonagh	10	0	3	3	1	6
Filipp Savchenko	12	0	3	3	1	2
Evgeni Fadeyev	15	0	2	2	-3	12
Konstantin Romanov	2	1	0	1	1	0
Samvel Mnatsyan	16	1	0	1	-3	17
Konstantin Savenkov	3	0	1	1	-2	0
Jon Mirasty	10	0	1	1	0	17
Fedor Belyakov	29	0	1	1	-4	12
Daniyar Kairov	1	0	0	0	0	0
Andrei Spiridonov	2	0	0	0	0	2
Jonas Junland	3	0	0	0	-5	10
Vadim Yermolayev	4	0	0	0	-1	2
Denis Bachurin	8	0	0	0	-5	0

Playoffs
Player	GP	G	A	Pts	+/-	PIM
Nigel Dawes	7	7	2	9	1	4
Brandon Bochenski	7	4	3	7	2	12
Dustin Boyd	7	1	5	6	1	2
Vadim Krasnoslobodtsev	7	1	4	5	1	0
Roman Savchenko	7	1	4	5	0	2
Konstantin Rudenko	7	1	2	3	-2	0
Talgat Zhailauov	5	1	2	3	-2	0
Fedor Polishchuk	7	3	0	3	-2	4
Roman Starchenko	6	1	1	2	-2	2
Andrew Hutchinson	7	0	2	2	-4	10
Maxim Spiridonov	5	0	1	1	0	0
Alexei Litvinenko	2	1	0	1	3	0
Konstantin Pushkaryov	3	1	0	1	-2	2
Mikhail Grigoriev	6	0	1	1	2	6
Alexei Troschinsky	6	0	1	1	-2	14
Dmitri Upper	7	0	0	0	-1	6
Vitali Novopashin	5	0	0	0	-3	2
Viktor Alexandrov	4	0	0	0	-2	4
Mikhail Rakhmanov	5	0	0	0	-2	0
Ilya Solaryov	7	0	0	0	-3	0
Evgeni Fadeyev	6	0	0	0	-4	4
Konstantin Romanov	3	0	0	0	-1	4
Samvel Mnatsyan	3	0	0	0	3	0
Fedor Belyakov	5	0	0	0	-2	0
Daniyar Kairov	0	0	0	0	0	0

=== Goaltenders ===
Regular season
Player	GP	W	L	SOP	SOG	GA	SV	SV%	GAA	G	A	SO	PIM	TOI
Teemu Lassila	23	10	9	2	505	53	452	89.5	2.71	0	1	2	6	1173:39
Vitali Yeremeyev	23	12	7	2	620	64	556	89.7	3.07	0	0	2	2	1249:15
Pavel Poluektov	16	4	6	0	343	37	306	89.2	3.14	0	0	0	0	707:02
Vladimir Kramar	1	0	0	0	9	2	7	77.8	6.32	0	0	0	0	19:00

Playoffs
Player	GP	W	L	SOP	SOG	GA	SV	SV%	GAA	G	A	SO	PIM	TOI
Vitali Yeremeyev	4	2	2	0	142	12	130	91.5	2.84	0	0	0	0	253:40
Pavel Poluektov	3	1	2	0	86	13	73	84.9	4.97	0	1	0	0	157:03
Vladimir Kramar	1	0	0	0	10	0	10	100.0	0.00	0	0	0	0	22:39

== Final roster ==
Updated March 5, 2013.

No.	Nat	Player	Pos	S/G	Age	Acquired	Birthplace
31	(Kazakhstan)	Vitali Yeremeyev	G	L	50	2010	Ust-Kamenogorsk, Kazakh SSR
35	(Finland)	Teemu Lassila	G	L	42	2012	Helsinki, Finland
1	(Kazakhstan)	Pavel Poluektov	G	L	33	2012	Serov, Russia
30	(Russia)	Vladimir Kramar	G	L	32	2012	Omsk, Russia
5	(Kazakhstan)	Alexei Litvinenko	D	L	45	2010	Ust-Kamenogorsk, Kazakh SSR
71	(Sweden)	Victor Hedman	D	L	35	Lockout	Ornskoldsvik, Sweden
13	(Russia)	Samvel Mnatsyan	D	L	35	2010	Omsk, Russian SFSR
4	(Kazakhstan)	Vitali Novopashin (A)	D	L	47	2010	Ust-Kamenogorsk, Kazakh SSR
44	(Sweden)	Jonas Junland	D	L	38	2011	Linköping, Sweden
50	(Russia)	Mikhail Grigoriev	D	R	34	2012	Tyumen, Russian SFSR
37	(Kazakhstan)	Evgeni Fadeyev	D	L	43	2010	Ust-Kamenogorsk, Kazakh SSR
94	(Kazakhstan)	Daniyar Kairov	D	L	31	2012	Oskemen, Kazakhstan
42	(Russia)	Fedor Belyakov	D	R	32	2012	Moscow, Russia
2	(Kazakhstan)	Roman Savchenko	D	L	37	2009	Ust-Kamenogorsk, Kazakh SSR
11	(Russia)	Denis Bachurin	D	L	34	2012	Novosibirsk, Russian RSFSR
73	(Kazakhstan)	Alexei Troschinsky	D	L	52	2009	Ust-Kamenogorsk, Kazakh SSR
24	(United States)	Andrew Hutchinson	D	R	45	2011	Evanston, Illinois, USA
64	(United States)	Ryan McDonagh	D	L	36	Lockout	St. Paul, Minnesota
36	(Kazakhstan)	Dmitri Upper (C)	C	R	47	2012	Dmitrievka, Kazakh SSR
39	(Kazakhstan)	Andrei Spiridonov	C	L	43	2008	Ust-Kamenogorsk, Kazakh SSR
8	(Kazakhstan)	Talgat Zhailauov	C	R	40	2007	Ust-Kamenogorsk, Kazakh SSR
41	(Canada)	Dustin Boyd	C	L	39	2011	Winnipeg, Manitoba, Canada
80	(Kazakhstan)	Nik Antropov	C	L	45	Lockout	Ust-Kamenogorsk, Kazakh SSR
48	(Kazakhstan)	Roman Starchenko	C	L	39	2008	Ust-Kamenogorsk, Kazakh SSR
25	(Kazakhstan)	Ilya Solaryov	C	L	43	2012	Perm, Russian SFSR
32	(Russia)	Vadim Yermolayev	F	R	36	2010	Magnitogorsk, Russian SFSR
62	(Kazakhstan)	Vadim Krasnoslobodtsev	LW	L	42	2008	Ust-Kamenogorsk, Kazakh SSR
18	(Kazakhstan)	Fedor Polishchuk	LW	L	46	2010	Chernihiv, Ukrainian SSR
9	(Canada)	Nigel Dawes	LW	L	40	2011	Winnipeg, Manitoba, Canada
87	(Kazakhstan)	Konstantin Savenkov	LW	L	35	2012	Ust-Kamenogorsk, Kazakh SSR
34	(Kazakhstan)	Konstantin Rudenko (A)	LW	R	44	2012	Ust-Kamenogorsk, Kazakh SSR
23	(Kazakhstan)	Viktor Alexandrov	RW	L	39	2012	Aktobe, Kazakh SSR
33	(Kazakhstan)	Andrei Gavrilin	RW	L	47	2007	Karaganda, Kazakh SSR
79	(Kazakhstan)	Mikhail Rakhmanov	RW	L	33	2012	Oskemen, Kazakhstan
27	(United States)	Brandon Bochenski	RW	R	43	2010	Blaine, Minnesota, USA
34	(Kazakhstan)	Konstantin Pushkaryov	RW	L	40	2010	Ust-Kamenogorsk, Kazakh SSR
85	(Kazakhstan)	Konstantin Romanov	RW	L	40	2009	Moscow, Russian SFSR
10	(Russia)	Maxim Spiridonov	RW	L	47	2012	Moscow, Russian SFSR

Note: Victor Hedman, Ryan McDonagh and Nik Antropov played for Barys during 2012-13 NHL lockout.

== Transactions ==
Source: EuroHockey.com

Date	Name	Moved from	Moved to
1 May 2012	(Kazakhstan) Dmitri Upper	(Russia) Atlant Moscow Oblast	-
1 May 2012	(Finland) Teemu Lassila	(Russia) Metallurg Novokuznetsk	-
3 June 2012	(Canada) Kevin Dallman	-	(Russia) SKA Saint Petersburg
13 July 2012	(Russia) Mikhail Grigoriev	(Russia) Salavat Yulayev Ufa	-
16 July 2012	(Kazakhstan) Viktor Alexandrov	(Russia) Sibir Novosibirsk	-
16 July 2012	(Kazakhstan) Konstantin Rudenko	(Russia) Atlant Moscow Oblast	-
16 July 2012	(Russia) Maxim Spiridonov	(Russia) Ak Bars Kazan	-
20 July 2012	(Czech Republic) Jiří Novotný	-	(Czech Republic) Lev Praha
4 August 2012	(Czech Republic) Lukáš Kašpar	-	(Ukraine) Donbass Donetsk
12 August 2012	(Canada) Jon Mirasty	(Russia) Vityaz Chekhov	-
14 August 2012	(Czech Republic) Kamil Kreps	-	(Slovenia) Slovan Bratislava
17 August 2012	(Canada) Jeff Glass	-	(Russia) Sibir Novosibirsk
3 September 2012	(Kazakhstan) Ilya Solaryov	(Kazakhstan) Yertis Pavlodar	-
21 September 2012	(Kazakhstan) Nik Antropov	(Canada) Winnipeg Jets	-
25 September 2012	(Sweden) Victor Hedman	(United States) Tampa Bay Lightning	-
4 October 2012	(Sweden) Jonas Junland	-	(Finland) Pelicans Lahti
9 October 2012	(United States) Ryan McDonagh	(United States) New York Rangers	-
22 January 2013	(Kazakhstan) Alexei Troschinsky	(Russia) Vityaz Chekhov	-

Note: Victor Hedman, Ryan McDonagh and Nik Antropov played for Barys during 2012-13 NHL lockout.

== Draft picks ==
Barys Astana's picks at the 2012 KHL Junior Draft in Chelyabinsk, Russia at the Traktor Sport Palace from May 25–26, 2012.

Round	Pick	Player	Position	Nationality	College/Junior/Club team (League)
1	14	Madiar Ibraybekov	D	Kazakhstan	Snezhnye Barsy (MHL)
4	121	Nikita Mikhailis	F	Kazakhstan	Snezhnye Barsy (MHL)
5	152	Ivan Stepanenko	D	Kazakhstan	Snezhnye Barsy (MHL)

== See also ==
- 2012–13 KHL season
