= 2013–14 Barys Astana season =

2013-14 Barys Astana
- Chernyshev Division champions
- Division: 1st Chernyshev
- Conference: 2nd Eastern
- 2013-14 record: 26–18–6–4
- Home record: 14–9–2–2
- Road record: 12–9–4–2
- Goals for: 182
- Goals against: 157

Team information
- President: Nurlan Orazbayev
- General manager: Vadim Guseinov
- Coach: Ari-Pekka Selin
- Captain: Dmitri Upper
- Alternate captains: Brandon Bochenski; Evgeni Blokhin
- Arena: Kazakhstan Sports Palace

Team leaders
- Goals: Brandon Bochenski (28)
- Assists: Brandon Bochenski (30)
- Points: Brandon Bochenski (58)
- Penalty minutes: Nik Antropov (62)
- Plus/minus: (+): Alexei Litvinenko (+17) (−): Artemi Lakiza (-9)
- Wins: Ari Ahonen (19)
- Goals against average: Ari Ahonen (2.53)

The 2013–14 Barys Astana season was the Kontinental Hockey League franchise's 6th season of play and 15th season overall. Barys posted a regular season record of 26 wins, 18 losses, 6 overtime/shootout wins and 4 overtime/shootout losses for 94 points. As a result, Barys won Chernyshev Division and finished 2nd in the Eastern Conference. The team qualified to playoffs a ten games before the end of the regular season on January 16, 2014. Barys ended the 2013–14 regular season as the Eastern Conference's second seed. In the first round of the 2014 Gagarin Cup playoffs, Barys defeated Avtomobilist Yekaterinburg 4-0 in series. Barys lost to Salavat Yulaev Ufa in semifinals 2-4 in series.

== Off-season ==
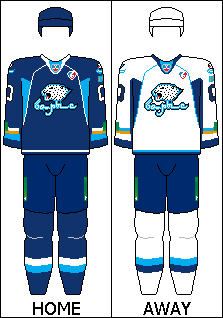
Jerseys for 2013/2014 season.

On May 14, 2013, Nurlan Orazbayev appointed as a president of the Barys, after a one-year pause. He was in this role from 2006 to 2012, before appointing Vadim Shakshakbayev in 2012–13 season. On May 18, 2013, Barys announced team will play at the 2013 Spengler Cup. Later, it was cancelled, because applications for participation in the tournament have filed by two KHL teams - Barys and CSKA. Due to the Olympic season, the league was not able to provide a "window" on the calendar for two league clubs, and in the end the choice was made in favor of the "Red Army", which submitted firstly the application. On May 25, 2013, Barys unveiled a new uniform for the 2013–14 KHL season. The new uniform designed by Reebok and includes new orange lines on the sleeves (Orange is one of the colors of Kazakhstan Temir Zholy, the owner of Barys). At the 2013 KHL Junior Draft, Barys selected Finnish Kalevan Pallo's player Kasperi Kapanen in the first round, twenty fifth overall. Also, Barys selected Kaapo Kähkönen, Dmitri Grents and Alikhan Asetov in the 2nd, 3rd and 4th round, respectively. Barys has appointed Ari-Pekka Selin as head coach. The 50-year-old Finn has signed a two-year contract and fills the vacancy left by Vladimir Krikunov, who returns to Neftekhimik Nizhnekamsk. Selin’s previous job was in charge of HPK Hameenlinna in Finland’s SM-liiga, a role he combined with that of assistant to Finland men's national ice hockey team head coach Jukka Jalonen. Assisting the new Barys chief on the coaching staff will be Andrei Shayanov, Raimo Helminen, Yerlan Sagymbayev and Alexander Achziger. On July 4, 2013, Barys officially joined to Astana Presidential Sports Club. National Welfare Fund Samruk-Kazyna will be a co-sponsor for Barys, along with Tsesnabank.

== Standings ==
=== Divisional standings ===
| | Chernyshev Division | GP | W | OTW | SOW | SOL | OTL | L | GF | GA | Pts |
|---|---|---|---|---|---|---|---|---|---|---|---|
| 1 | (Kazakhstan) Barys Astana | 54 | 26 | 2 | 4 | 2 | 2 | 18 | 182 | 157 | 94 |
| 2 | (Russia) Salavat Yulaev Ufa | 54 | 25 | 3 | 3 | 4 | 3 | 16 | 155 | 140 | 94 |
| 3 | (Russia) Sibir Novosibirsk | 54 | 22 | 2 | 5 | 6 | 1 | 18 | 125 | 117 | 87 |
| 4 | (Russia) Admiral Vladivostok | 54 | 21 | 1 | 4 | 4 | 1 | 23 | 135 | 129 | 78 |
| 5 | (Russia) Avangard Omsk | 54 | 17 | 1 | 5 | 4 | 2 | 25 | 136 | 162 | 69 |
| 6 | (Russia) Metallurg Novokuznetsk | 54 | 12 | 1 | 1 | 4 | 6 | 30 | 115 | 170 | 50 |
| 7 | (Russia) Amur Khabarovsk | 54 | 8 | 1 | 4 | 10 | 1 | 30 | 106 | 182 | 45 |

=== Conference standings ===
| | Eastern Conference | Div | GP | W | OTW | SOW | SOL | OTL | L | GF | GA | Pts |
|---|---|---|---|---|---|---|---|---|---|---|---|---|
| 1 | Z – Metallurg Magnitogorsk | KHA | 54 | 30 | 3 | 2 | 6 | 2 | 11 | 166 | 113 | 108 |
| 2 | Y – Barys Astana | CHE | 54 | 26 | 2 | 4 | 2 | 2 | 18 | 182 | 157 | 94 |
| 3 | Ak Bars Kazan | KHA | 54 | 26 | 4 | 4 | 5 | 1 | 14 | 139 | 108 | 100 |
| 4 | Salavat Yulaev Ufa | CHE | 54 | 25 | 3 | 3 | 4 | 3 | 16 | 155 | 140 | 94 |
| 4 | Torpedo Nizhny Novgorod | KHA | 54 | 25 | 2 | 5 | 3 | 2 | 17 | 153 | 121 | 94 |
| 6 | Sibir Novosibirsk | CHE | 54 | 22 | 2 | 5 | 6 | 1 | 18 | 125 | 117 | 87 |
| 7 | Avtomobilist Yekaterinburg | KHA | 54 | 22 | 0 | 7 | 5 | 1 | 19 | 134 | 125 | 86 |
| 8 | Admiral Vladivostok | CHE | 54 | 21 | 1 | 4 | 4 | 1 | 23 | 135 | 129 | 78 |
| 9 | Traktor Chelyabinsk | KHA | 54 | 18 | 1 | 6 | 5 | 2 | 22 | 126 | 148 | 75 |
| 10 | Avangard Omsk | CHE | 54 | 17 | 1 | 5 | 4 | 2 | 25 | 136 | 162 | 69 |
| 11 | Yugra Khanty-Mansiysk | KHA | 54 | 16 | 1 | 3 | 2 | 6 | 26 | 128 | 166 | 64 |
| 12 | Neftekhimik Nizhnekamsk | KHA | 54 | 15 | 2 | 2 | 3 | 1 | 31 | 127 | 152 | 57 |
| 13 | Metallurg Novokuznetsk | CHE | 54 | 12 | 1 | 1 | 4 | 6 | 30 | 115 | 170 | 50 |
| 14 | Amur Khabarovsk | CHE | 54 | 8 | 1 | 4 | 10 | 1 | 30 | 106 | 182 | 45 |

Y – Clinched Division;
Z – Clinched Conference
KHA – Kharlamov Division,
CHE – Chernyshev Division

== Schedule and results ==
=== Pre-season ===
2013–14 Game Log
August: 5–2–1–1 (Home: 3–0–1–0; Road: 2–2–0–1)

| Game | Date | Opponent | Score | Decision | Location | Attendance | Record | Points | Recap |
|---|---|---|---|---|---|---|---|---|---|
| 1 | August 3 | @ HC Davos | 5-2 | Dmitri Malgin | Vaillant Arena, Davos | 556 | 1–0–0–0 | — | |
| 2 | August 4 | @ HC Davos | 1-3 | Dmitri Malgin | EH Gurlaina, Scuol | 503 | 1–1–0–0 | — | |
President of the Republic of Kazakhstan's Cup - Barys won the tournament
| 3 | August 9 | Amur Khabarovsk | 8-0 | Ari Ahonen | Kazakhstan Sports Palace | | 2–1–0–0 | 3 | |
| 4 | August 10 | Yugra Khanty-Mansiysk | 5-4 (SO) | Vitali Yeremeyev | Kazakhstan Sports Palace | | 2–1–1–0 | 5 | |
| 5 | August 12 | Vityaz Podolsk | 4-2 | Vitali Yeremeyev | Kazakhstan Sports Palace | 3,278 | 3–1–1–0 | 8 | |
| 6 | August 13 | Yugra Khanty-Mansiysk | 4-3 | Ari Ahonen | Kazakhstan Sports Palace | | 4–1–1–0 | Final | |
Ivan Romazan Memorial Cup - Barys finished 3rd in the tournament
| 7 | August 26 | @ Metallurg Magnitogorsk | 0-4 | Ari Ahonen | Arena Metallurg | | 4–2–1–0 | 0 | |
| 8 | August 27 | @ Traktor Chelyabinsk | 3-2 | Vitali Yeremeyev | Arena Metallurg | | 5–2–1–0 | 3 | |
| 9 | August 28 | @ Yugra Khanty-Mansiysk | 3-4 (SO) | Ari Ahonen | Arena Metallurg | | 5–2–1–1 | 3 | |

Win Overtime/shootout win Overtime/shootout loss Loss

=== Regular season ===
2013–14 Game Log
September: 8–2–0–0 (Home: 5–1–0–0; Road: 3–1–0–0) Pts. 24

| Game | Date | Opponent | Score | Decision | Location | Attendance | Record | Points | Recap |
|---|---|---|---|---|---|---|---|---|---|
| 1 | September 8 | Severstal Cherepovets | 10-1 | Ari Ahonen | Kazakhstan Sports Palace | 4,100 | 1–0–0–0 | 3 | |
| 2 | September 10 | Lokomotiv Yaroslavl | 5-3 | Ari Ahonen | Kazakhstan Sports Palace | 3,853 | 2-0-0-0 | 6 | |
| 3 | September 12 | SKA Saint Petersburg | 2-5 | Ari Ahonen | Kazakhstan Sports Palace | 4,070 | 2-1-0-0 | 6 | |
| 4 | September 14 | Atlant Moscow Oblast | 5-4 | Vitali Yeremeyev | Kazakhstan Sports Palace | 3,511 | 3-1-0-0 | 9 | |
| 5 | September 17 | Avangard Omsk | 5-2 | Vitali Yeremeyev | Kazakhstan Sports Palace | 4,063 | 4-1-0-0 | 12 | |
| 6 | September 19 | @ Yugra Khanty-Mansiysk | 6-2 | Ari Ahonen | Arena Ugra | 2,700 | 5-1-0-0 | 15 | |
| 7 | September 22 | Avtomobilist Yekaterinburg | 7-2 | Ari Ahonen | Kazakhstan Sports Palace | 4,100 | 6-1-0-0 | 18 | |
| 8 | September 26 | @ Donbass Donetsk | 4-2 | Ari Ahonen | Druzhba Arena | 3,916 | 7-1-0-0 | 21 | |
| 9 | September 28 | @ Medveščak Zagreb | 2-3 | Ari Ahonen | Dom Sportova | 6,350 | 7-2-0-0 | 21 | |
| 10 | September 30 | @ Dinamo Minsk | 4-2 | Vitali Yeremeyev | Minsk-Arena | 7,825 | 8-2-0-0 | 24 | |

October: 7–3–2–0 (Home: 2–3–2–0; Road: 5–0–0–0) Pts. 25

| Game | Date | Opponent | Score | Decision | Location | Attendance | Record | Points | Recap |
|---|---|---|---|---|---|---|---|---|---|
| 11 | October 2 | @ Spartak Moscow | 4-3 | Ari Ahonen | Sokolniki Arena | 2,309 | 9-2-0-0 | 27 | |
| 12 | October 8 | Vityaz Podolsk | 3-2 (SO) | Ari Ahonen | Kazakhstan Sports Palace | 4,050 | 9-2-1-0 | 29 | |
| 13 | October 10 | Dynamo Moscow | 4-3 (SO) | Vitali Yeremeyev | Kazakhstan Sports Palace | 4,050 | 9-2-2-0 | 31 | |
| 14 | October 12 | Ak Bars Kazan | 0-5 | Ari Ahonen | Kazakhstan Sports Palace | 4,070 | 9-3-2-0 | 31 | |
| 15 | October 14 | Torpedo Nizhny Novgorod | 4-2 | Vitali Yeremeyev | Kazakhstan Sports Palace | 4,070 | 10-3-2-0 | 34 | |
| 16 | October 17 | @ Metallurg Novokuznetsk | 5-3 | Vitali Yeremeyev | Kuznetsk Metallurgists Arena | 2,715 | 11-3-2-0 | 37 | |
| 17 | October 19 | @ Sibir Novosibirsk | 3-2 | Vitali Yeremeyev | Ice Sports Palace Sibir | 7,400 | 12-3-2-0 | 40 | |
| 18 | October 21 | @ Admiral Vladivostok | 3-1 | Ari Ahonen | Fetisov Arena | 5,500 | 13-3-2-0 | 43 | |
| 19 | October 23 | @ Amur Khabarovsk | 4-3 | Ari Ahonen | Platinum Arena | 6,820 | 14-3-2-0 | 46 | |
| 20 | October 26 | Metallurg Magnitogorsk | 1-2 | Vitali Yeremeyev | Kazakhstan Sports Palace | 4,070 | 14-4-2-0 | 46 | |
| 21 | October 28 | Traktor Chelyabinsk | 1-5 | Vitali Yeremeyev | Kazakhstan Sports Palace | 4,070 | 14-5-2-0 | 46 | |
| 22 | October 30 | Neftekhimik Nizhnekamsk | 5-1 | Ari Ahonen | Kazakhstan Sports Palace | 4,000 | 15-5-2-0 | 49 | |

November: 3–3–1–2 (Home: 2–2–0–1; Road: 1–1–1–1) Pts. 13

| Game | Date | Opponent | Score | Decision | Location | Attendance | Record | Points | Recap |
|---|---|---|---|---|---|---|---|---|---|
| 23 | November 1 | Salavat Yulaev Ufa | 3-2 | Ari Ahonen | Kazakhstan Sports Palace | 4,070 | 16-5-2-0 | 52 | |
| 24 | November 13 | @ Dinamo Riga | 2-3 (SO) | Ari Ahonen | Arena Riga | 7,120 | 16-5-2-1 | 53 | |
| 25 | November 15 | @ CSKA Moscow | 0-3 | Ari Ahonen | CSKA Ice Palace | 4,373 | 16-6-2-1 | 53 | |
| 26 | November 17 | @ Slovan Bratislava | 6-2 | Vitali Yeremeyev | Slovnaft Arena | 10,055 | 17-6-2-1 | 56 | |
| 27 | November 19 | @ Lev Prague | 3-2 (OT) | Vitali Yeremeyev | Tipsport Arena | 4,716 | 17-6-3-1 | 58 | |
| 28 | November 22 | Dinamo Riga | 4-5 (SO) | Ari Ahonen | Kazakhstan Sports Palace | 4,070 | 17-6-3-2 | 59 | |
| 29 | November 24 | CSKA Moscow | 2-5 | Vitali Yeremeyev | Kazakhstan Sports Palace | 4,070 | 17-7-3-2 | 59 | |
| 30 | November 26 | Slovan Bratislava | 6-1 | Ari Ahonen | Kazakhstan Sports Palace | 4,002 | 18-7-3-2 | 62 | |
| 31 | November 28 | Lev Prague | 2-3 | Ari Ahonen | Kazakhstan Sports Palace | 4,070 | 18-8-3-2 | 62 | |

December: 5–2–1–0 (Home: 3–1–0–0; Road: 2–1–1–0) Pts. 17

| Game | Date | Opponent | Score | Decision | Location | Attendance | Record | Points | Recap |
|---|---|---|---|---|---|---|---|---|---|
| 32 | December 1 | @ Metallurg Magnitogorsk | 4-3 (SO) | Ari Ahonen | Arena Metallurg | 7,061 | 18-8-4-2 | 64 | |
| 33 | December 3 | @ Traktor Chelyabinsk | 4-0 | Ari Ahonen | Traktor Ice Arena | 7,450 | 19-8-4-2 | 67 | |
| 34 | December 5 | @ Neftekhimik Nizhnekamsk | 1-0 | Ari Ahonen | Neftekhimik Ice Palace | 5,000 | 20-8-4-2 | 70 | |
| 35 | December 7 | @ Salavat Yulaev Ufa | 3-6 | Ari Ahonen | Ufa Arena | 7,820 | 20-9-4-2 | 70 | |
| 36 | December 11 | Metallurg Novokuznetsk | 5-3 | Ari Ahonen | Kazakhstan Sports Palace | 4,070 | 21-9-4-2 | 73 | |
| 37 | December 13 | Sibir Novosibirsk | 3-4 | Vitali Yeremeyev | Kazakhstan Sports Palace | 4,070 | 21-10-4-2 | 73 | |
| 38 | December 26 | Admiral Vladivostok | 6-3 | Ari Ahonen | Kazakhstan Sports Palace | 4,070 | 22-10-4-2 | 76 | |
| 39 | December 28 | Amur Khabarovsk | 8-2 | Ari Ahonen | Kazakhstan Sports Palace | 4,070 | 23-10-4-2 | 79 | |

January: 3–4–2–2 (Home: 2–2–0–1; Road: 1–2–2–1) Pts. 15

| Game | Date | Opponent | Score | Decision | Location | Attendance | Record | Points | Recap |
|---|---|---|---|---|---|---|---|---|---|
| 40 | January 3 | @ Vityaz Podolsk | 2-1 (SO) | Ari Ahonen | Vityaz Ice Palace | 4,300 | 23-10-5-2 | 81 | |
| 41 | January 5 | @ Dynamo Moscow | 2-3 (OT) | Vitali Yeremeyev | Balashikha Arena | 5,486 | 23-10-5-3 | 82 | |
| 42 | January 7 | @ Ak Bars Kazan | 2-1 | Ari Ahonen | TatNeft Arena | 7,210 | 24-10-5-3 | 85 | |
| 43 | January 9 | @ Torpedo Nizhny Novgorod | 2-7 | Vitali Yeremeyev | Trade Union Sport Palace | 5,500 | 24-11-5-3 | 85 | |
| 44 | January 14 | Spartak Moscow | 4-2 | Ari Ahonen | Kazakhstan Sports Palace | 4,070 | 25-11-5-3 | 88 | |
| 45 | January 16 | Medveščak Zagreb | 1-3 | Ari Ahonen | Kazakhstan Sports Palace | 4,070 | 25-12-5-3 | 88 | |
| 46 | January 18 | Donbass Donetsk | 2-6 | Ari Ahonen | Kazakhstan Sports Palace | 4,070 | 25-13-5-3 | 88 | |
| 47 | January 20 | Dinamo Minsk | 1-2 (OT) | Vitali Yeremeyev | Kazakhstan Sports Palace | 4,020 | 25-13-5-4 | 89 | |
| 48 | January 24 | @ Avtomobilist Yekaterinburg | 2-6 | Ari Ahonen | KRK Uralets | 5,570 | 25-14-5-4 | 89 | |
| 49 | January 26 | @ Avangard Omsk | 5-4 (OT) | Vitali Yeremeyev | Arena Omsk | 10,040 | 25-14-6-4 | 91 | |
| 50 | January 28 | Yugra Khanty-Mansiysk | 4-2 | Ari Ahonen | Kazakhstan Sports Palace | 4,070 | 26-14-6-4 | 94 | |

February: 0–2–0–0 (Home: 0–0–0–0; Road: 0–2–0–0) Pts. 0

| Game | Date | Opponent | Score | Decision | Location | Attendance | Record | Points | Recap |
|---|---|---|---|---|---|---|---|---|---|
| 51 | February 26 | @ Atlant Moscow Oblast | 1-5 | Ari Ahonen | Mytishchi Arena | 4,900 | 26-15-6-4 | 94 | |
| 52 | February 28 | @ SKA Saint Petersburg | 2-3 | Vitali Yeremeyev | Ice Palace | 12,186 | 26-16-6-4 | 94 | |

March: 0–2–0–0 (Home: 0–0–0–0; Road: 0–2–0–0) Pts. 0

| Game | Date | Opponent | Score | Decision | Location | Attendance | Record | Points | Recap |
|---|---|---|---|---|---|---|---|---|---|
| 53 | March 2 | @ Severstal Cherepovets | 1-2 | Ari Ahonen | Ice Palace | 4,140 | 26-17-6-4 | 94 | |
| 54 | March 4 | @ Lokomotiv Yaroslavl | 1-4 | Ari Ahonen | Arena 2000 | 8,757 | 26-18-6-4 | 94 | |

Win (3 points) Overtime/shootout win (2 points) Overtime/shootout loss (1 point) Loss (0 points)

=== Playoffs ===
2014 Gagarin Cup Playoffs
Eastern Conference Quarterfinals - #2 Barys vs. #7 Avtomobilist – Barys won series 4–0

| Game | Date | Opponent | Score | Decision | Location | Attendance | Series | Recap |
|---|---|---|---|---|---|---|---|---|
| 1 | March 8 | Avtomobilist Yekaterinburg | 3–2 (2OT) | Ari Ahonen | Kazakhstan Sports Palace | 4,070 | 1–0 | |
| 2 | March 9 | Avtomobilist Yekaterinburg | 5–4 (OT) | Vitali Yeremeyev | Kazakhstan Sports Palace | 4,070 | 2–0 | |
| 3 | March 11 | Avtomobilist Yekaterinburg | 2–1 | Vitali Yeremeyev | KRK Uralets | 5,570 | 3–0 | |
| 4 | March 12 | Avtomobilist Yekaterinburg | 2–1 | Vitali Yeremeyev | KRK Uralets | 5,570 | 4–0 | |

Eastern Conference Semifinals - #2 Barys vs. #4 Salavat Yulaev – Salavat Yulaev won series 4–2

| Game | Date | Opponent | Score | Decision | Location | Attendance | Series | Recap |
|---|---|---|---|---|---|---|---|---|
| 1 | March 21 | Salavat Yulaev Ufa | 2–3 (OT) | Vitali Yeremeyev | Kazakhstan Sports Palace | 4,070 | 0–1 | |
| 2 | March 22 | Salavat Yulaev Ufa | 5–2 | Vitali Yeremeyev | Kazakhstan Sports Palace | 4,070 | 1–1 | |
| 3 | March 24 | Salavat Yulaev Ufa | 2–5 | Vitali Yeremeyev | Ufa Arena | 7,570 | 1–2 | |
| 4 | March 25 | Salavat Yulaev Ufa | 2–3 (OT) | Vitali Yeremeyev | Ufa Arena | 7,870 | 1–3 | |
| 5 | March 27 | Salavat Yulaev Ufa | 2–1 | Vitali Yeremeyev | Kazakhstan Sports Palace | 4,070 | 2–3 | |
| 6 | March 29 | Salavat Yulaev Ufa | 2–3 | Vitali Yeremeyev | Ufa Arena | 7,820 | 2-4 | |

Win Loss

== Player statistics ==
Last updated: March 7, 2014.
Source: Kontinental Hockey League.

=== Skaters ===
Regular season
| Player | GP | G | A | Pts | PIM | +/- |
|---|---|---|---|---|---|---|
| Brandon Bochenski | 54 | 28 | 30 | 58 | 55 | +17 |
| Nigel Dawes | 54 | 26 | 23 | 49 | 18 | +7 |
| Dustin Boyd | 49 | 18 | 20 | 38 | 41 | +15 |
| Roman Starchenko | 53 | 18 | 16 | 34 | 24 | 0 |
| Talgat Zhailauov | 52 | 10 | 21 | 31 | 26 | +4 |
| Konstantin Rudenko | 51 | 9 | 18 | 27 | 32 | 0 |
| Nik Antropov | 36 | 8 | 18 | 26 | 62 | +7 |
| Mike Lundin | 53 | 5 | 19 | 24 | 6 | +7 |
| Dmitri Upper | 54 | 10 | 12 | 22 | 24 | -3 |
| Roman Savchenko | 54 | 5 | 12 | 17 | 36 | -3 |
| Mikhail Rakhmanov | 54 | 8 | 5 | 13 | 10 | +6 |
| Evgeni Blokhin | 44 | 5 | 7 | 12 | 40 | +12 |
| Cam Barker | 26 | 2 | 10 | 12 | 26 | -6 |
| Fedor Polishchuk | 48 | 5 | 5 | 10 | 24 | -2 |
| Maxim Semyonov | 44 | 0 | 10 | 10 | 59 | +12 |
| Alexei Litvinenko | 48 | 2 | 7 | 9 | 62 | +17 |
| Maxim Spiridonov | 9 | 4 | 3 | 7 | 2 | +4 |
| Konstantin Romanov | 30 | 4 | 3 | 7 | 0 | -8 |
| Artemi Lakiza | 34 | 2 | 4 | 6 | 10 | -9 |
| Andrei Gavrilin | 40 | 0 | 6 | 6 | 16 | -2 |
| Mikhail Panshin | 17 | 3 | 2 | 5 | 4 | +1 |
| Vladimir Grebenschikov | 28 | 2 | 3 | 5 | 16 | +5 |
| Josh Gratton | 11 | 1 | 3 | 4 | 12 | +1 |
| Konstantin Pushkaryov | 21 | 1 | 3 | 4 | 33 | -1 |
| Kristian Kudroc | 8 | 0 | 4 | 4 | 6 | -3 |
| Zach Hamill | 13 | 1 | 2 | 3 | 10 | -5 |
| Alexei Antsiferov | 2 | 0 | 1 | 1 | 2 | 0 |
| Vladislav Kolesnikov | 12 | 0 | 1 | 1 | 8 | +1 |
| Evgeni Fadeyev | 1 | 0 | 0 | 0 | 0 | 0 |
| Nikita Tserenok | 2 | 0 | 0 | 0 | 12 | +1 |

=== Goaltenders ===
Regular season
| Player | GP | W | L | SOP | SOG | GA | SV | SV% | GAA | G | A | SO | PIM | TOI |
|---|---|---|---|---|---|---|---|---|---|---|---|---|---|---|
| Ari Ahonen | 36 | 19 | 12 | 5 | 1020 | 88 | 932 | 91.4 | 2.53 | 0 | 1 | 2 | 0 | 2085:00 |
| Vitali Yeremeyev | 20 | 9 | 8 | 1 | 585 | 58 | 527 | 90.1 | 3.07 | 1 | 1 | 0 | 0 | 1132:13 |
| Pavel Poluektov | 2 | 0 | 0 | 0 | 10 | 2 | 8 | 80.0 | 4.67 | 0 | 0 | 0 | 0 | 25:42 |
| Dmitri Malgin | 1 | 0 | 0 | 0 | 5 | 1 | 4 | 80.0 | 3.59 | 0 | 0 | 0 | 0 | 16:43 |

== Awards ==
Regular season
| Player | Award | Reached |
|---|---|---|
| (Kazakhstan) Vladimir Grebenschikov | KHL Best Rookie of the Week | November 5, 2013 |
| (United States) Brandon Bochenski | KHL All Star Game starting forward | November 29, 2013 |
| (United States) Brandon Bochenski | KHL Best Forward of the Week | December 2, 2013 |
| (Kazakhstan) Talgat Zhailauov | Selected for the KHL All Star Game | December 24, 2013 |
| (United States) Brandon Bochenski | KHL Best Forward of the Week | December 30, 2013 |
| (United States) Brandon Bochenski | KHL Best Forward of the Month | January 3, 2014 |
| (United States) Brandon Bochenski | KHL Best Forward of the Week | January 27, 2014 |

== Final roster ==
Updated January 9, 2014.

| No. | Nat | Player | Pos | S/G | Age | Acquired | Birthplace |
|---|---|---|---|---|---|---|---|
| 30 | (Finland) | Ari Ahonen | G | L | 45 | 2013 | Jyväskylä, Finland |
| 31 | (Kazakhstan) | Vitali Yeremeyev | G | L | 51 | 2010 | Ust-Kamenogorsk, Kazakh SSR |
| 20 | (Kazakhstan) | Dmitri Malgin | G | L | 39 | 2013 | Ust-Kamenogorsk, Kazakh SSR |
| 1 | (Kazakhstan) | Pavel Poluektov | G | L | 34 | 2012 | Serov, Russia |
| 5 | (Kazakhstan) | Alexei Litvinenko | D | L | 46 | 2010 | Ust-Kamenogorsk, Kazakh SSR |
| 4 | (Slovakia) | Kristian Kudroc | D | R | 45 | 2014 | Michalovce, Czechoslovakia |
| 37 | (Kazakhstan) | Evgeni Fadeyev | D | L | 44 | 2010 | Ust-Kamenogorsk, Kazakh SSR |
| 7 | (Kazakhstan) | Maxim Semyonov | D | L | 42 | 2013 | Ust-Kamenogorsk, Kazakh SSR |
| 65 | (Kazakhstan) | Evgeni Blokhin (A) | D | L | 47 | 2012 | Ust-Kamenogorsk, Kazakh SSR |
| 44 | (Russia) | Nikita Tserenok | D | L | 33 | 2013 | Moscow, Russia |
| 39 | (United States) | Mike Lundin | D | L | 42 | 2013 | Apple Valley, Minnesota, United States |
| 70 | (Kazakhstan) | Vladislav Kolesnikov | D | R | 42 | 2013 | Ust-Kamenogorsk, Kazakh SSR |
| 25 | (Canada) | Cam Barker | D | L | 40 | 2013 | Winnipeg, Manitoba, Canada |
| 94 | (Kazakhstan) | Vladimir Grebenshchikov | D | L | 34 | 2013 | Temirtau, Kazakhstan |
| 2 | (Kazakhstan) | Roman Savchenko | D | L | 38 | 2009 | Ust-Kamenogorsk, Kazakh SSR |
| 87 | (Kazakhstan) | Artemi Lakiza | D | L | 39 | 2007 | Ust-Kamenogorsk, Kazakh SSR |
| 91 | (Russia) | Alexei Antsiferov | F | R | 35 | 2013 | Novosibirsk, Russian SFSR |
| 57 | (Russia) | Mikhail Panshin | F | R | 43 | 2013 | Cherepovets, Russian SFSR |
| 36 | (Kazakhstan) | Dmitri Upper (C) | C | R | 48 | 2012 | Ust-Kamenogorsk, Kazakh SSR |
| 8 | (Kazakhstan) | Talgat Zhailauov | C | R | 41 | 2007 | Ust-Kamenogorsk, Kazakh SSR |
| 41 | (Canada) | Dustin Boyd | C | L | 40 | 2011 | Winnipeg, Manitoba, Canada |
| 80 | (Kazakhstan) | Nik Antropov | C | L | 46 | 2013 | Ust-Kamenogorsk, Kazakh SSR |
| 88 | (Canada) | Zach Hamill | C | R | 38 | 2013 | Port Coquitlam, British Columbia, Canada |
| 9 | (Canada) | Nigel Dawes | LW | L | 41 | 2011 | Winnipeg, Manitoba, Canada |
| 48 | (Kazakhstan) | Roman Starchenko | LW | L | 40 | 2008 | Ust-Kamenogorsk, Kazakh SSR |
| 14 | (Canada) | Josh Gratton | LW | L | 44 | 2011 | Brantford, Ontario, Canada |
| 34 | (Kazakhstan) | Konstantin Rudenko | LW | R | 45 | 2012 | Ust-Kamenogorsk, Kazakh SSR |
| 18 | (Kazakhstan) | Fedor Polishchuk | LW | L | 47 | 2010 | Chernihiv, Ukrainian SSR |
| 27 | (United States) | Brandon Bochenski (A) | RW | R | 44 | 2010 | Blaine, Minnesota, United States |
| 81 | (Kazakhstan) | Konstantin Pushkaryov | RW | L | 41 | 2010 | Ust-Kamenogorsk, Kazakh SSR |
| 79 | (Kazakhstan) | Mikhail Rakhmanov | RW | L | 34 | 2012 | Oskemen, Kazakhstan |
| 33 | (Kazakhstan) | Andrei Gavrilin | RW | L | 48 | 2007 | Karaganda, Kazakh SSR |
| 85 | (Kazakhstan) | Konstantin Romanov | RW | L | 41 | 2009 | Moscow, Russian SFSR |
| 10 | (Russia) | Maxim Spiridonov | RW | L | 48 | 2012 | Moscow, Russian SFSR |

== Transactions ==
=== Trades ===
| Date | Details |
|---|---|---|
| May 1, 2013 | To Spartak Moscow (Sweden) Victor Hedman (4th-round pick (#83 overall) in 2009) | To Barys Astana 2nd-round pick in 2013 |
| May 1, 2013 | To Avangard Omsk (Finland) Teemu Lassila | To Barys Astana (Russia) Viktor Kalnoy and (Russia) Fedor Kozlovsky |
| May 22, 2013 | To Neftekhimik Nizhnekamsk (Russia) Fedor Belyakov and (Russia) Samvel Mnatsyan | To Barys Astana (Kazakhstan) Evgeni Blokhin |
| January 14, 2014 | To Sibir Novosibirsk 3rd-round pick in 2014 | To Barys Astana (Slovakia) Kristian Kudroc |

=== Free agents signed ===
| Player | Former team | 'Date | Contract terms |
|---|---|---|---|
| (Canada) Josh Gratton | Saryarka Karagandy | May 4, 2013 | One-year contract |
| (United States) Mike Lundin | Ottawa Senators | June 11, 2013 | One-year contract |
| (Finland) Ari Ahonen | Metallurg Magnitogorsk | June 19, 2013 | One-year contract |
| (Kazakhstan) Maxim Semyonov | Lokomotiv Yaroslavl | June 22, 2013 | Two-year contract |
| (Kazakhstan) Nik Antropov | Winnipeg Jets | August 8, 2013 | Two-year contract |
| (Canada) Cam Barker | Vancouver Canucks | November 5, 2013 | One-year contract |
| (Canada) Zach Hamill | Vancouver Canucks | December 24, 2013 | One-year contract |

=== Extensions ===
| Player | Date | Contract terms |
|---|---|---|
| (Kazakhstan) Vitali Yeremeyev | April 4, 2013 | One-year extension |
| (Kazakhstan) Roman Starchenko | April 12, 2013 | Three-year extension |
| (Kazakhstan) Alexei Litvinenko | April 26, 2013 | Two-year extension |
| (Kazakhstan) Roman Savchenko | April 30, 2013 | Two-year extension |
| (Canada) Nigel Dawes | April 30, 2013 | Two-year extension |
| (Canada) Dustin Boyd | April 30, 2013 | Two-year extension |
| (Kazakhstan) Konstantin Pushkaryov | May 23, 2013 | One-year extension |
| (Kazakhstan) Evgeni Fadeyev | May 23, 2013 | Two-year extension |
| (Kazakhstan) Konstantin Romanov | May 23, 2013 | Two-year extension |
| (Kazakhstan) Fedor Polishchuk | May 23, 2013 | Two-year extension |
| (Kazakhstan) Artemi Lakiza | May 24, 2013 | Two-year extension |
| (Kazakhstan) Andrei Gavrilin | July 15, 2013 | One-year extension |

=== Free agents lost ===
| Player | New team | Contract terms |
|---|---|---|
| (Russia) Filipp Savchenko | Avtomobilist Yekaterinburg | One-year contract |
| (Kazakhstan) Vadim Krasnoslobodtsev | Torpedo Nizhny Novgorod | Entry-level contract |
| (Kazakhstan) Vitali Novopashin | Atlant Moscow Oblast | Two-year contract |
| (Russia) Mikhail Grigoriev | Torpedo Nizhny Novgorod | Entry-level contract |
| (United States) Andrew Hutchinson | EV Zug | One-year contract |
| (Canada) Jon Mirasty | Sorel-Tracy Éperviers | One-year contract |
| (Kazakhstan) Ilya Solaryov | Danbury Whalers | Two-year contract |
| (Kazakhstan) Viktor Alexandrov | Unknown | Unknown |
| (Canada) Josh Gratton | Unknown | Unknown |

=== Lost via Waivers ===
| Player | New team | Date claimed off waivers |
|---|---|---|
| (Russia) Maxim Spiridonov | Torpedo Nizhny Novgorod | December 19, 2013 |

== Draft picks ==
Barys Astana's picks at the 2013 KHL Junior Draft in Donetsk, Ukraine at the Druzhba Arena on May 25–26, 2013.

| Round | Pick | Player | Position | Nationality | College/Junior/Club team (League) |
|---|---|---|---|---|---|
| 1 | 25 | Kasperi Kapanen | LW | Finland | KalPa (SM-liiga) |
| 2 | 53 | Kaapo Kähkönen | G | Finland | Espoo Blues (SM-liiga) |
| 3 | 92 | Dmitri Grents | F | Kazakhstan | Kazzinc-Torpedo-2 (KAZ) |
| 4 | 128 | Alikhan Asetov | F | Kazakhstan | Kazzinc-Torpedo-2 (KAZ) |

== Farm teams ==
- Nomad Astana (Kazakhstan Hockey Championship)
- Snezhnye Barsy (Junior Hockey League)

== See also ==
- 2013–14 KHL season
