= List of Barys Astana players =

This is a complete list of ice hockey players who have played for the Barys Astana in the Kontinental Hockey League (KHL). It includes players that have played at least one match, either in the KHL regular season or in the KHL playoffs. Players with names in bold type are current players on the team. Statistics are complete to the beginning of the 2013–14 season.

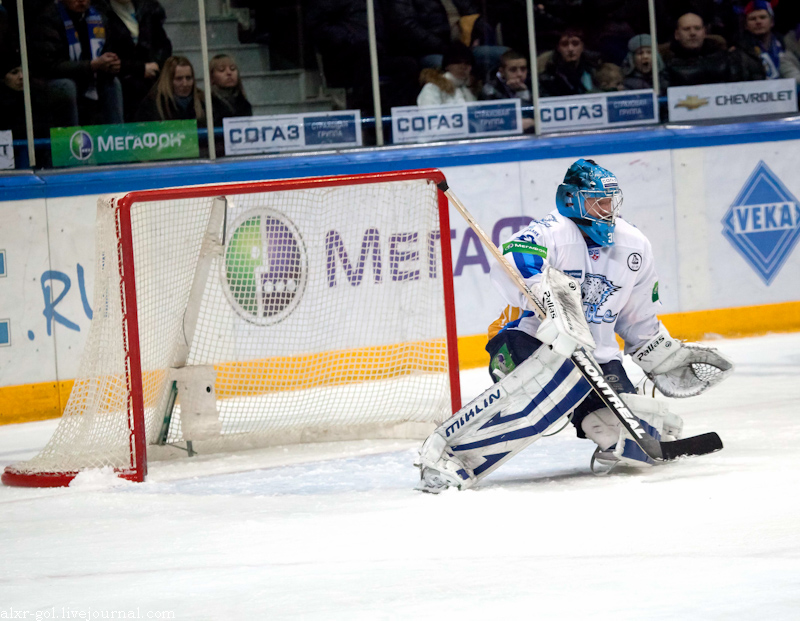
Vitali Yeremeyev.

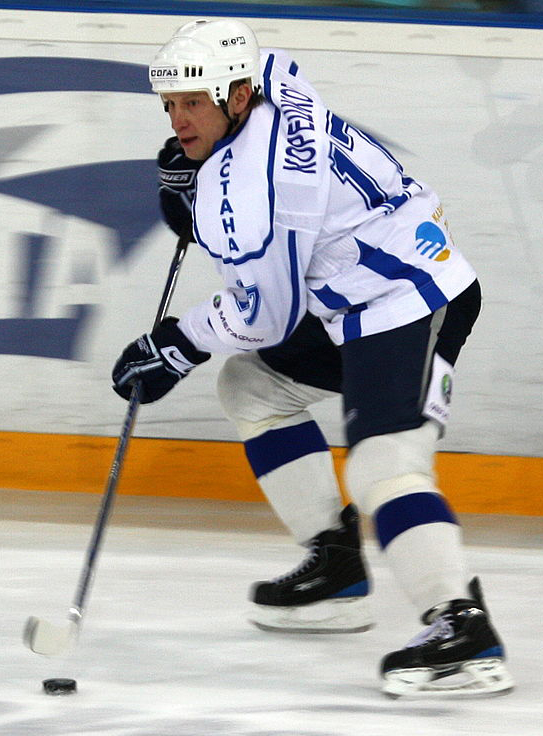
Alexander Koreshkov.

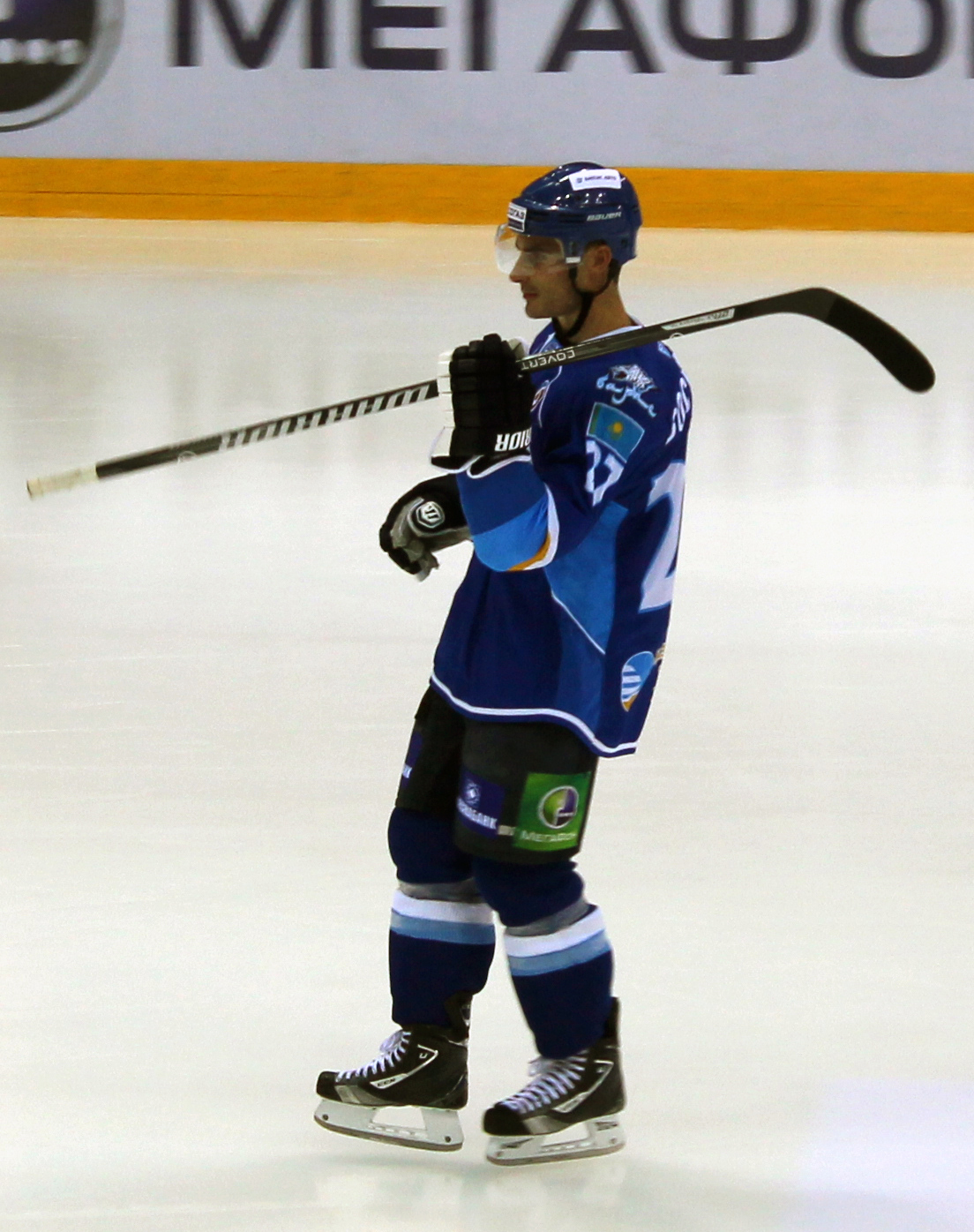
Brandon Bochenski.

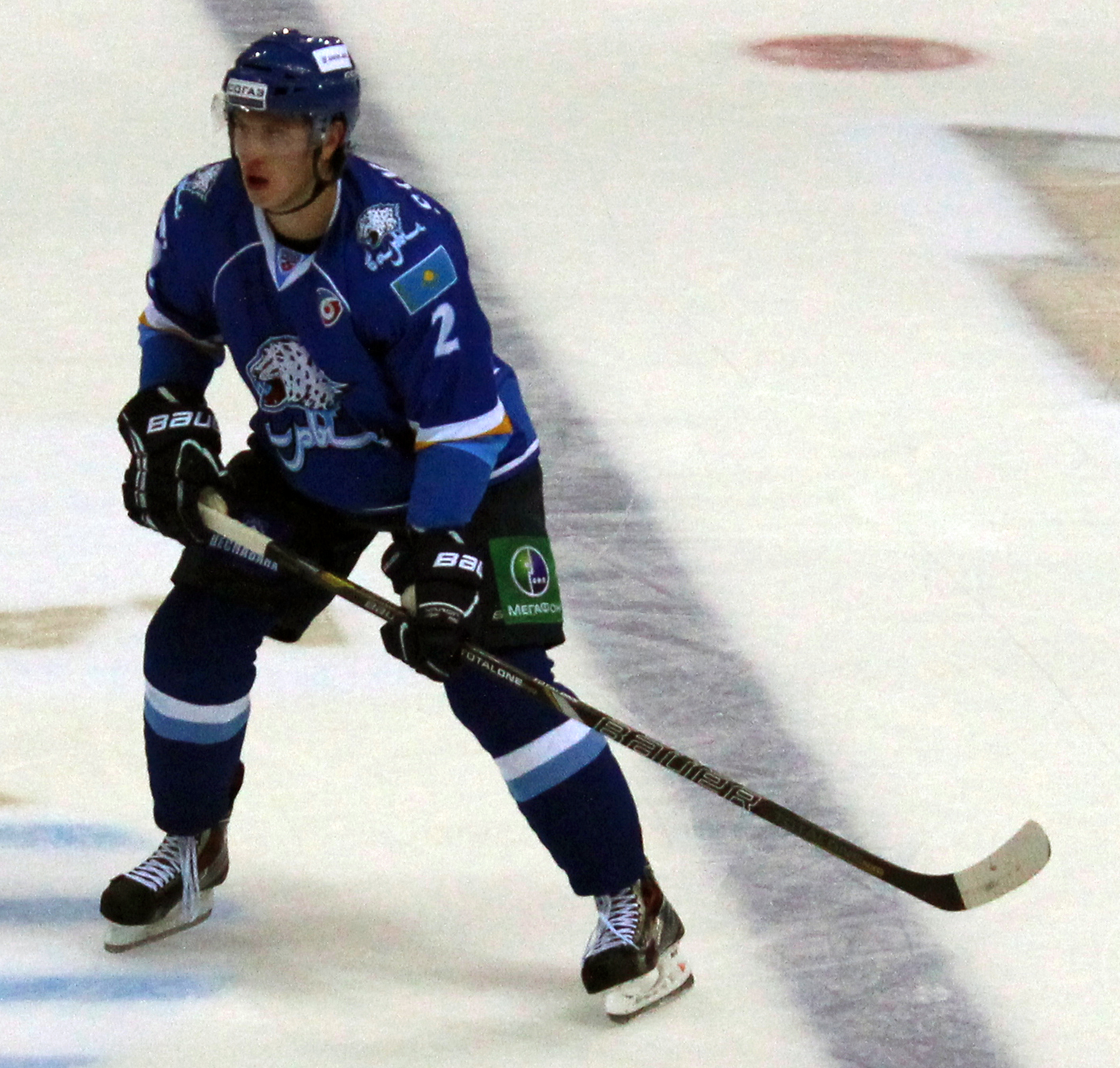
Roman Savchenko.

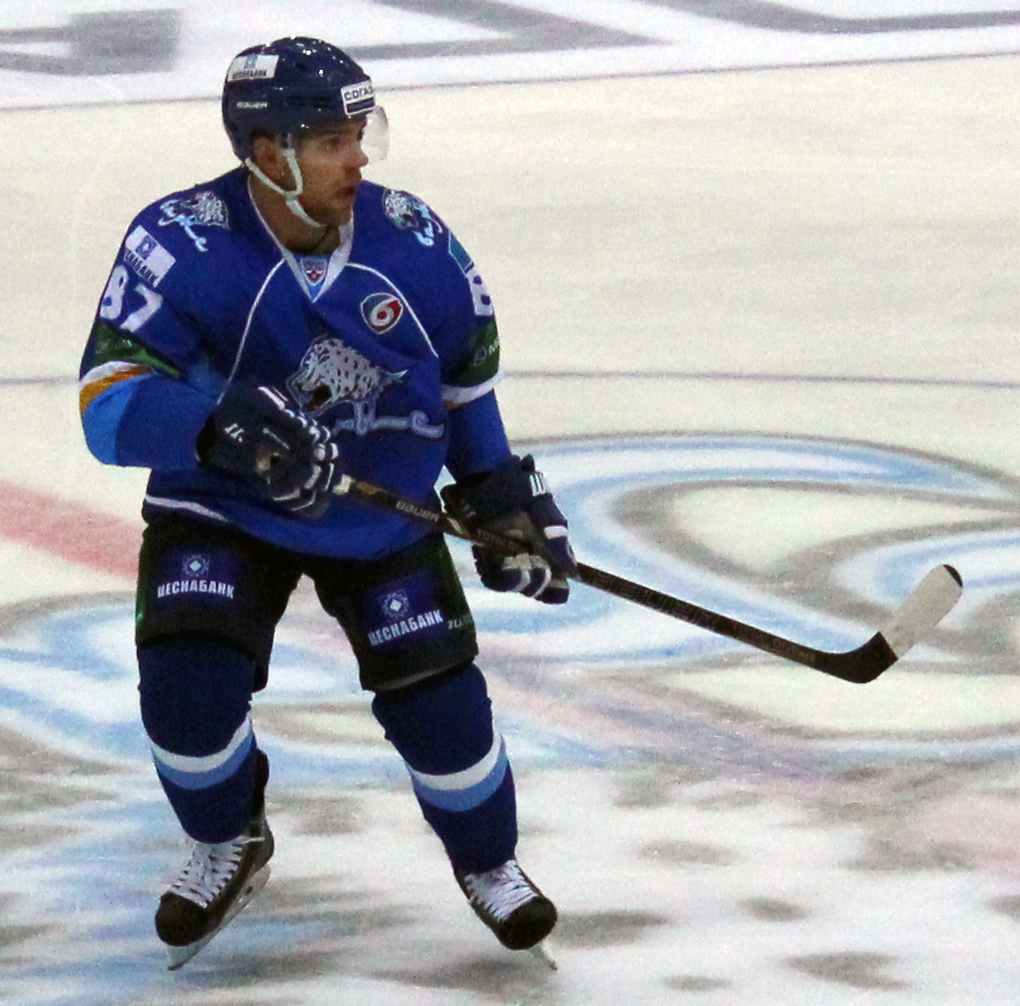
Artemi Lakiza.

Skaters
Player name	Nat	GP	G	A	Pts	PIM	Years	Seasons
**Viktor Alexandrov**	(Kazakhstan)	36	6	3	9	18	2010–2013	2
Vladimir Antipin	(Kazakhstan)	22	0	3	3	26	2009–2010	1
Nik Antropov	(Kazakhstan)	26	3	13	16	39	2012–2013	1
Riley Armstrong	(United States)	9	1	0	1	16	2010–2011	1
Denis Bachurin	(Russia)	8	0	0	0	0	2012–2013	1
Maksim Belyayev	(Kazakhstan)	11	0	3	3	0	2008–2009	1
Fedor Belyakov	(Russia)	29	0	1	1	12	2012–2013	1
**Brandon Bochenski**	(United States)	137	69	74	143	84	2010–2013	3
**Dustin Boyd**	(Canada)	104	33	30	63	26	2011–2013	2
Evgeni Bumagin	(Kazakhstan)	49	1	5	6	12	2010–2012	2
Kyle Calder	(Canada)	13	3	4	7	16	2010–2011	1
Kevin Dallman	(Canada)	214	72	120	192	280	2008–2012	4
**Nigel Dawes**	(Canada)	103	36	30	66	62	2011–2013	2
**Evgeni Fadeyev**	(Kazakhstan)	94	5	9	14	44	2008–2013	4
Sergei Gimayev	(Russia)	151	11	11	22	196	2008–2011	3
**Andrei Gavrilin**	(Kazakhstan)	221	28	61	89	140	2008–2013	5
Konstantin Glazachev	(Russia)	98	44	39	83	48	2008–2010	2
**Josh Gratton**	(Canada)	35	1	3	4	91	2011–2012	1
Mikhail Grigoriev	(Russia)	50	1	7	8	48	2012–2013	1
Victor Hedman	(Sweden)	26	1	20	21	70	2012–2013	1
Andrew Hutchinson	(United States)	93	5	23	28	62	2011–2013	2
Jonas Junland	(Sweden)	49	4	11	15	40	2011–2013	2
Alexei Ishmametyev	(Kazakhstan)	23	0	4	4	62	2010–2012	2
**Daniyar Kairov**	(Kazakhstan)	1	0	0	0	0	2012–2013	1
Lukáš Kašpar	(Czech Republic)	103	37	36	73	85	2010–2012	2
Anton Kazantsev	(Kazakhstan)	32	0	0	0	93	2008–2011	3
Maxim Khudyakov	(Kazakhstan)	40	7	7	14	18	2010–2012	2
Tomáš Klouček	(Czech Republic)	99	7	24	31	306	2008–2011	3
Denis Kochetkov	(Russia)	14	2	3	5	2	2008–2009	1
Alexander Koreshkov	(Kazakhstan)	91	11	17	28	32	2008–2010	2
Vadim Krasnoslobodtsev	(Kazakhstan)	231	48	68	116	131	2008–2013	5
Kamil Kreps	(Czech Republic)	52	9	20	29	23	2011–2012	1
Dan LaCouture	(Canada)	12	2	1	3	51	2008–2009	1
**Artemi Lakiza**	(Kazakhstan)	70	0	3	3	54	2008–2012	4
Trevor Letowski	(Canada)	91	10	17	27	54	2008–2010	2
**Alexei Litvinenko**	(Kazakhstan)	90	7	14	21	135	2010–2013	3
Ryan McDonagh	(United States)	10	0	3	3	6	2012–2013	1
Branislav Mezei	(Slovakia)	56	5	5	10	151	2008–2009	1
Jon Mirasty	(Canada)	10	0	1	1	17	2012–2013	1
Samvel Mnatsyan	(Russia)	16	1	0	1	17	2012–2013	1
David Nemirovsky	(Canada)	47	15	14	29	28	2009–2010	1
Vitali Novopashin	(Kazakhstan)	142	8	34	42	76	2010–2013	3
Jiri Novotny	(Czech Republic)	92	21	41	62	100	2010–2012	2
Peter Podhradsky	(Slovakia)	56	8	19	27	52	2009–2010	1
**Fedor Polischuk**	(Kazakhstan)	136	9	21	30	40	2010–2013	3
Tom Preissing	(United States)	2	1	0	1	0	2010–2011	1
**Konstantin Pushkaryov**	(Kazakhstan)	57	5	9	14	54	2010–2013	3
**Mikhail Rakhmanov**	(Kazakhstan)	23	2	5	7	4	2012–2013	1
**Konstantin Romanov**	(Kazakhstan)	95	11	4	15	30	2009–2013	4
Rail Rozakov	(Russia)	5	0	0	0	4	2008–2009	1
**Konstantin Rudenko**	(Kazakhstan)	47	14	17	31	65	2012–2013	1
Evgeni Rymarev	(Kazakhstan)	121	9	14	23	48	2008–2012	4
Phillip Savchenko	(Russia)	12	0	3	3	2	2012–2013	1
**Roman Savchenko**	(Kazakhstan)	180	20	28	48	101	2008–2013	5
Denis Shemelin	(Kazakhstan)	11	0	3	3	8	2008–2009	1
Alexander Shin	(Kazakhstan)	54	4	11	15	12	2009–2011	2
Alexander Skugarev	(Russia)	21	3	5	8	8	2008–2009	1
Vitali Smolyaninov	(Kazakhstan)	14	1	2	3	10	2008–2009	1
Ilya Solaryov	(Kazakhstan)	119	15	16	31	58	2008–2013	4
Gabriel Spilar	(Slovakia)	31	5	2	7	6	2008–2009	1
Andrei Spiridonov	(Kazakhstan)	79	7	2	9	36	2008–2013	4
**Maxim Spiridonov**	(Russia)	143	50	60	110	134	2008–2013	3
**Roman Starchenko**	(Kazakhstan)	233	48	42	90	98	2008–2013	5
Gennady Stolyarov	(Russia)	41	12	9	21	24	2008–2009	1
Jozef Stümpel	(Slovakia)	99	23	62	85	91	2008–2010	2
Alexander Titov	(Russia)	22	1	7	8	22	2008–2009	1
**Alexei Troschinsky**	(Kazakhstan)	6	0	3	3	4	2012–2013	1
Andrei Troschinsky	(Kazakhstan)	2	0	0	0	6	2008–2009	1
**Dmitry Upper**	(Kazakhstan)	51	12	10	22	38	2012–2013	1
Alexei Vasilchenko	(Kazakhstan)	115	3	15	18	178	2008–2011	3
Alexei Vorontsov	(Kazakhstan)	44	2	3	5	65	2009–2011	2
Vadim Yermolayev	(Russia)	13	0	0	0	6	2010–2013	3
**Talgat Zhailauov**	(Kazakhstan)	222	44	57	101	89	2008–2013	5
