= Achziger =

Achziger is a surname. Notable people with the surname include:

- Alexander Achziger (born 1953), Kazakhstani-German ice hockey coach
- Harvey Achziger (1931–2022), American businessman and football player
