= Daniyar Kairov =

Kazakhstani ice hockey player (born 1994)

- Born: 5 April 1994 (age 31) Oskemen, Kazakhstan
- Height: 6 ft 0 in (183 cm)
- Weight: 209 lb (95 kg; 14 st 13 lb)
- Position: Defence
- Shoots: Left
- KHL team: Barys Astana
- National team: Kazakhstan
- Playing career: 2010–present

Daniyar Zhandosuly Kairov (Kazakh: Данияр Жандосұлы Қайыров, Daniiar Jandosūly Qaiyrov; born 5 April 1994) is a Kazakh professional ice hockey defenceman currently playing for the Barys Astana in the Kontinental Hockey League (KHL).

== Career ==
Kairov started his career with the Torpedo Oskemen in the Kazakhstan Hockey Championship in 2010. He was drafted in the first round 19th overall in the 2011 KHL Junior Draft by the SKA Saint Petersburg. On 6 June 2011, his rights were traded to the Barys Astana for 2nd and 3rd round draft picks in 2012. Next year, he joined to Barys Astana system, to play in its junior team Snezhnye Barsy. During the 2012–13 MHL season, Kairov was selected to play in the MHL Challenge Cup. On 15 January 2013, he made his KHL debut in the match against the Ugra Khanty-Mansiysk.

== Career statistics ==
=== Regular season and playoffs ===
			Regular season					Playoffs
Season	Team	League	GP	G	A	Pts	PIM	GP	G	A	Pts	PIM
2010–11	Torpedo Oskemen	KAZ	2	0	0	0	4	—	—	—	—	—
2011–12	Nomad Astana	KAZ	2	0	0	0	0	—	—	—	—	—
2011–12	Snezhnye Barsy Astana	MHL	53	3	2	5	56	6	0	0	4	0
2012–13	Barys Astana	KHL	1	0	0	0	0	—	—	—	—	—
2012–13	Nomad Astana	KAZ	4	0	0	0	12	—	—	—	—	—
2012–13	Snezhnye Barsy Astana	MHL	57	3	11	14	125	—	—	—	—	—
2013–14	Snezhnye Barsy Astana	MHL	56	7	9	16	50	3	0	0	0	22
2014–15	Nomad Astana	KAZ	3	0	3	3	2	—	—	—	—	—
2014–15	Snezhnye Barsy Astana	MHL	46	6	15	21	38	5	1	1	2	4
KHL totals			1	0	0	0	0	—	—	—	—	—

=== International ===
Year	Team	Event	GP	G	A	Pts	PIM
2010	Kazakhstan U18	U18 (Div I)	5	0	2	2	2
2011	Kazakhstan U18	U18 (Div I)	4	1	1	2	0
2012	Kazakhstan U18	U18 (Div I)	5	1	4	5	2
2012	Kazakhstan U20	WJC (Div I)	5	0	1	1	2
2013	Kazakhstan U20	WJC (Div I)	5	0	1	1	10
2014	Kazakhstan U20	WJC (Div I)	5	0	1	1	29
Junior int'l totals			29	2	9	11	47
