= President of the Republic of Kazakhstan's Cup =

Ice hockey tournament in Kazakhstan

- Sport: Ice hockey
- Founded: 2010
- Founder: Nursultan Nazarbayev
- No. of teams: 4 or 5 (group stage)
- Venue: Kazakhstan Sports Palace
- Most recent champion: (Russia) Neftekhimik Nizhnekamsk
- Most titles: (Kazakhstan) Barys Astana (4)
- Qualification: Invitation only
- Broadcasters: Kazakhstan: Qazsport; Russia: KHL-TV

The President of the Republic of Kazakhstan's Cup is an annual pre-season ice hockey tournament held in Nur-Sultan, Kazakhstan. The tournament was first held in 2010 by the initiative of the president of Kazakhstan Nursultan Nazarbayev. The event is hosted by the KHL team Barys Astana and played each year in August. Currently, all games are held at Kazakhstan Sports Palace.

== Winners ==
Year	Winner	Runner-up
2010	(Kazakhstan) Barys Astana	(Belarus) Dinamo Minsk
2011	(Kazakhstan) Barys Astana	(Russia) Yugra Khanty-Mansiysk
2012	(Russia) SKA Saint Petersburg	(Kazakhstan) Barys Astana
2013	(Kazakhstan) Barys Astana	(Russia) Yugra Khanty-Mansiysk
2014	(Russia) Avangard Omsk	(Kazakhstan) Barys Astana
2015	(Kazakhstan) Barys Astana	(Russia) Admiral Vladivostok
2016	(Russia) Metallurg Novokuznetsk	(Kazakhstan) Barys Astana
2017	(Russia) Neftekhimik Nizhnekamsk	(Russia) Traktor Chelyabinsk
2018	(Russia) Amur Khabarovsk	(Russia) Neftekhimik Nizhnekamsk
