= Vladimir Kramar =

Russian ice hockey player (born 1993)

- Born: April 14, 1993 (age 32) Omsk, Russia
- Height: 5 ft 9 in (175 cm)
- Weight: 152 lb (69 kg; 10 st 12 lb)
- Position: Goaltender
- Shoots: Left
- VHL team Former teams: Nomad Nur-Sultan; Barys Astana
- Playing career: 2008–present

Vladimir Kramar (Russian: Владимир Крамарь; born April 14, 1993) is a Russian-Kazakhstani professional ice hockey goalie currently playing for Nomad Nur-Sultan in the Supreme Hockey League (VHL). He has formerly played 1 game with parent affiliate, the then Barys Astana of the Kontinental Hockey League (KHL).
