= Nikita Tserenok =

Russian ice hockey player

- Born: April 10, 1993 (age 31); Moscow, Russia
- Height: 6 ft 4 in (193 cm)
- Weight: 212 lb (96 kg; 15 st 2 lb)
- Position: Defence
- Shoots: Left
- KHL team Former teams: Admiral Vladivostok; Barys Astana
- NHL draft: Undrafted
- Playing career: 2013–present

Nikita Olegovich Tserenok (Russian: Никита Олегович Церенок; born July 27, 1993) a Russian professional ice hockey defenceman who currently plays for Admiral Vladivostok of the Kontinental Hockey League (KHL). Tserenok selected 154th overall in the seventh round of 2010 KHL Junior Draft by Ak Bars Kazan.
