= Vladislav Kolesnikov =

Kazakhstani ice hockey player

- Born: July 27, 1984 (age 40); Ust-Kamenogorsk, Kazakh SSR, Soviet Union
- Height: 5 ft 11 in (180 cm)
- Weight: 190 lb (86 kg; 13 st 8 lb)
- Position: Defence
- Shoots: Right
- KAZ team Former teams: Arlan Kokshetau; Lada Togliatti; CSK VVS Samara; Traktor Chelyabinsk; Gazovik Tyumen; Kazzinc-Torpedo; Barys Astana; Neftyanik Almetievsk
- National team: Kazakhstan
- Playing career: 2002–present

Vladislav Sergeyevich Kolesnikov (Russian: Владисла́в Серге́евич Коле́сников; born July 27, 1984) is a Kazakhstani professional ice hockey defenceman who currently plays for Arlan Kokshetau of the Kazakhstan Hockey Championship (KAZ). He was a member of the Kazakhstan men's national ice hockey team at the 2012 IIHF World Championship.
