= Fedor Belyakov =

Russian ice hockey player

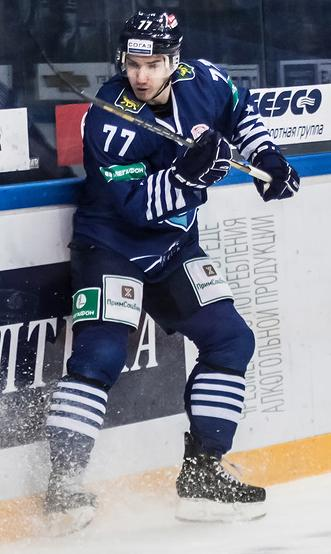
- Born: April 10, 1993 (age 31); Moscow, Russia
- Height: 6 ft 1 in (185 cm)
- Weight: 203 lb (92 kg; 14 st 7 lb)
- Position: Defenceman
- Shoots: Right
- VHL team Former teams: HC Yugra; Barys Astana; Neftekhimik Nizhnekamsk; CSKA Moscow; Admiral Vladivostok; Sibir Novosibirsk; Salavat Yulaev Ufa; Torpedo Nizhny Novgorod; Avangard Omsk
- Playing career: 2009–present

Fedor Igorevich Belyakov (Russian: Федор Игоревич Беляков; born April 10, 1993) a Russian professional ice hockey defenceman who currently plays with HC Yugra organization of the Supreme Hockey League (VHL).

== Playing career ==
Belyakov was selected 27th overall in the second round of 2010 KHL Junior Draft by Metallurg Novokuznetsk.

On 6 May 2019, Belyakov left HC CSKA Moscow for a second time following the 2018–19 season, securing a one-year contract with his 8th KHL club, Avtomobilist Yekaterinburg.

After concluding a second stint with Admiral Vladivostok in the 2021–22 season, Belyakov joined Avangard Omsk as a free agent on 22 May 2022.

== Career statistics ==
			Regular season					Playoffs
Season	Team	League	GP	G	A	Pts	PIM	GP	G	A	Pts	PIM
2010–11	Kuznetskie Medvedi Novokuznetsk	MHL	53	3	7	10	20	—	—	—	—	—
2011–12	Kuznetskie Medvedi Novokuznetsk	MHL	50	3	10	13	75	5	0	0	0	0
2012–13	Snezhnye Barsy Astana	MHL	18	0	7	7	38	—	—	—	—	—
2012–13	Barys Astana	KHL	29	0	1	1	12	5	0	0	0	0
2013–14	HC Neftekhimik Nizhnekamsk	KHL	40	1	2	3	16	—	—	—	—	—
2013–14	CSKA Moscow	KHL	1	0	0	0	0	—	—	—	—	—
2013–14	Krasnaya Armiya	MHL	1	0	0	0	0	—	—	—	—	—
2014–15	Admiral Vladivostok	KHL	18	1	3	4	24	—	—	—	—	—
2014–15	Molot-Prikamie Perm	VHL	9	0	1	1	2	—	—	—	—	—
2015–16	Admiral Vladivostok	KHL	1	0	0	0	0	—	—	—	—	—
2015–16	HC Sibir Novosibirsk	KHL	22	0	2	2	10	10	0	1	1	10
2016–17	HC Sibir Novosibirsk	KHL	57	2	1	3	24	—	—	—	—	—
2017–18	HC Sibir Novosibirsk	KHL	7	0	1	1	4	—	—	—	—	—
2017–18	Salavat Yulaev Ufa	KHL	10	0	1	1	8	—	—	—	—	—
2017–18	Torpedo Nizhny Novgorod	KHL	7	0	1	1	2	4	0	0	0	2
2018–19	Torpedo Ust-Kamenogorsk	VHL	16	0	4	4	12	—	—	—	—	—
2018–19	CSKA Moscow	KHL	1	0	0	0	0	—	—	—	—	—
2018–19	Zvezda Chekhov	VHL	38	1	6	7	18	9	0	1	1	14
2019–20	Gornyak Uchaly	VHL	20	1	5	6	2	—	—	—	—	—
2019–20	HC Yugra	VHL	13	1	2	3	2	9	0	1	1	4
2020–21	HC Yugra	VHL	43	0	7	7	34	20	3	1	4	4
2021–22	Admiral Vladivostok	KHL	31	0	0	0	21	—	—	—	—	—
2022–23	Avangard Omsk	KHL	10	0	2	2	0	—	—	—	—	—
2022–23	Omskie Krylia	VHL	15	1	2	3	41	—	—	—	—	—
KHL totals			234	4	14	18	121	19	0	1	1	12
