= Pavel Poluektov =

Kazakhstani ice hockey player

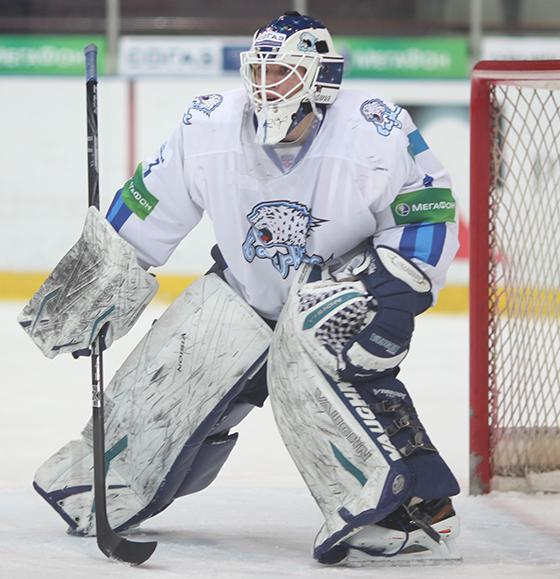
- Poluektov with Barys Astana in 2013.
- Born: January 10, 1992 (age 33); Serov, Russia
- Height: 5 ft 11 in (180 cm)
- Weight: 181 lb (82 kg; 12 st 13 lb)
- Position: Goaltender
- Shoots: Left
- KHL team (P) Cur. team Former teams: Barys Astana; Nomad Astana (KAZ); Metallurg Serov; Gornyak Rudny; Beibarys Atyrau
- National team: Kazakhstan
- NHL draft: Undrafted
- Playing career: 2008–present

Pavel Andreyevich Poluektov (Russian: Павел Андреевич Полуэктов; born January 10, 1992) is a Russian born Kazakh professional ice hockey goaltender currently playing with Barys Astana of the Kontinental Hockey League (KHL).
