= Alexei Troschinsky =

Kazakhstani ice hockey player

- Born: October 9, 1973 (age 51); Ust-Kamenogorsk, Kazakh SSR, Soviet Union
- Height: 6 ft 0 in (183 cm)
- Weight: 205 lb (93 kg; 14 st 9 lb)
- Position: Defence
- Shot: Left
- Played for: Torpedo Ust-Kamenogorsk; Dynamo Moscow; Metallurg Magnitogorsk; Avangard Omsk; Torpedo Nizhny Novgorod; Atlant Mytishchi; Vityaz Chekhov; Barys Astana
- National team: Kazakhstan
- NHL draft: Undrafted
- Playing career: 1990–2013

Alexei Borisovich Troschinsky (Russian: Алексей Борисович Трощи́нский; born October 9, 1973) is a Kazakhstani former professional ice hockey defenceman.

== Career statistics ==
=== Regular season and playoffs ===
			Regular season					Playoffs
Season	Team	League	GP	G	A	Pts	PIM	GP	G	A	Pts	PIM
1990–91	Torpedo Ust–Kamenogorsk	URS	16	0	0	0	4	—	—	—	—	—
1991–92	Torpedo Ust–Kamenogorsk	CIS	30	1	2	3	22	6	1	0	1	10
1992–93	Torpedo Ust–Kamenogorsk	IHL	36	2	3	5	12	1	0	0	0	0
1992–93	Torpedo–2 Ust–Kamenogorsk	RUS.2	4	0	2	2	4	—	—	—	—	—
1993–94	Torpedo Ust–Kamenogorsk	IHL	41	3	5	8	38	—	—	—	—	—
1994–95	Dynamo Moscow	IHL	41	1	5	6	28	6	0	1	1	4
1995–96	Dynamo Moscow	IHL	40	2	7	9	34	4	0	2	2	4
1995–96	Dynamo–2 Moscow	RUS.2	1	0	0	0	2	—	—	—	—	—
1996–97	Dynamo Moscow	RSL	42	7	6	13	24	4	0	0	0	4
1996–97	Dynamo–2 Moscow	RUS.3	1	1	0	1	0	—	—	—	—	—
1997–98	Dynamo Moscow	RSL	43	3	13	16	32	8	1	3	4	6
1998–99	Dynamo Moscow	RSL	41	5	5	10	32	16	1	2	3	18
1999–2000	Dynamo Moscow	RSL	29	4	4	8	38	17	2	2	4	4
2000–01	Metallurg Magnitogorsk	RSL	42	1	11	12	34	—	—	—	—	—
2001–02	Dynamo Moscow	RSL	42	4	15	19	34	3	0	1	1	2
2001–02	Dynamo–2 Moscow	RUS.3	1	0	0	0	2	—	—	—	—	—
2002–03	Dynamo Moscow	RSL	26	1	4	5	18	—	—	—	—	—
2003–04	Dynamo Moscow	RSL	51	2	9	11	58	3	0	1	1	2
2004–05	Dynamo Moscow	RSL	59	4	11	15	62	10	0	4	4	18
2005–06	Avangard Omsk	RSL	51	6	6	12	86	13	1	1	2	20
2006–07	Avangard Omsk	RSL	54	11	19	30	92	11	2	1	3	12
2007–08	Dynamo Moscow	RSL	44	2	7	9	99	9	1	1	2	8
2008–09	Torpedo Nizhny Novgorod	KHL	38	2	13	15	60	3	0	0	0	8
2009–10	Torpedo Nizhny Novgorod	KHL	54	3	15	18	42	—	—	—	—	—
2010–11	Atlant Moscow Oblast	KHL	19	0	1	1	8	—	—	—	—	—
2010–11	HC Ryazan	VHL	9	0	6	6	2	—	—	—	—	—
2010–11	Vityaz Chekhov	KHL	9	2	2	4	18	—	—	—	—	—
2011–12	Vityaz Chekhov	KHL	49	5	5	10	42	—	—	—	—	—
2012–13	Vityaz Chekhov	KHL	44	2	5	7	26	—	—	—	—	—
2012–13	Barys Astana	KHL	6	0	3	3	4	6	0	1	1	14
IHL totals			158	8	20	28	112	11	0	3	3	8
RSL totals			524	50	110	160	609	94	8	16	24	94
KHL totals			219	14	44	58	200	9	0	1	1	22

=== International ===
Year	Team	Event	GP	G	A	Pts	PIM
1991	Soviet Union	EJC	5	2	2	4	4
1992	CIS	WJC	7	0	1	1	2
1993	Kazakhstan	WC C	7	1	4	5	8
1994	Kazakhstan	WC C	6	1	1	2	10
1996	Kazakhstan	WC C	7	1	2	3	14
1997	Kazakhstan	WC B	7	1	1	2	8
1998	Kazakhstan	OG	7	0	1	1	32
1998	Kazakhstan	WC	3	0	1	1	27
1999	Kazakhstan	WC B	7	0	0	0	6
2000	Kazakhstan	WC B	7	1	3	4	2
2004	Kazakhstan	WC	6	0	4	4	6
2011	Kazakhstan	WC D1	5	0	3	3	2
2012	Kazakhstan	WC	7	0	1	1	0
2013	Kazakhstan	OGQ	3	0	1	1	4
2013	Kazakhstan	WC D1A	5	1	0	1	6
Junior totals			12	2	3	5	6
Senior totals			77	6	22	28	125

Sporting positions
Preceded by Alexei Kosourov	Torpedo Nizhny Novgorod captain 2012-2013	Succeeded by Evgeny Varlamov
Preceded by Daniil Markov	Vityaz Chekhov captain 2012-2013	Succeeded by Maxim Rybin
