= Kazakhstan Sports Palace =

Sports venue in Kazakhstan

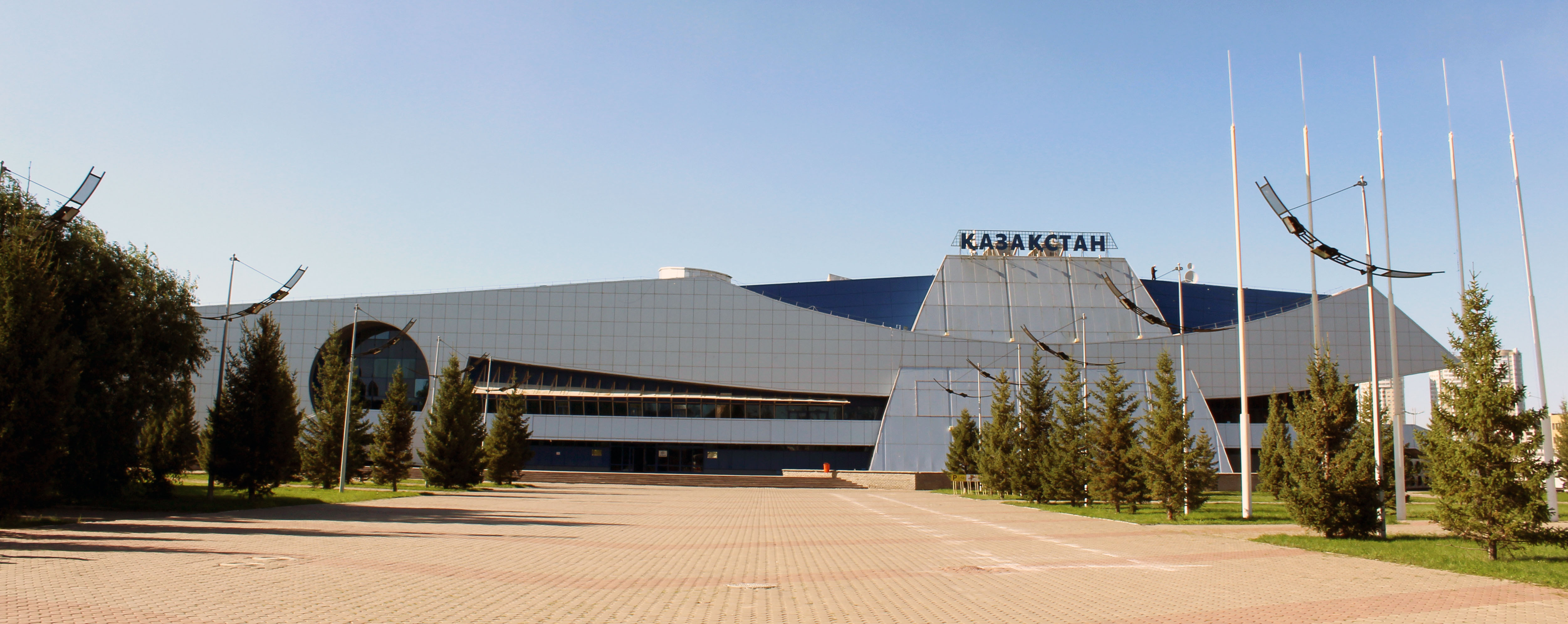
- Interactive map of Kazakhstan Sports Palace
- Location: Astana, Kazakhstan
- Coordinates: 51°09′20.61″N 71°27′55.01″E
- Capacity: Ice hockey: 4,070

Construction
- Built: 1999–2001
- Opened: 6 March 2001
- Renovated: 2007

Tenants
- Barys Astana (KHL) (2001–2015); Nomad Astana (KAZ) (2009–present); Snezhnye Barsy (MHL) (2011–present); HC Astana (KAZ) (2011–present); 2011 Asian Winter Games

Website
- www.dskazakhstan.kz

The Kazakhstan Sports Palace (Kazakh: Qazaqstan sport saraiy) is a palace of sports in Astana, Kazakhstan. It is the home of Nomad Astana and HC Astana of the Kazakhstan Hockey Championship, and Snezhnye Barsy junior hockey team of the Junior Hockey League. It seats 4,070 spectators for ice hockey.

== History ==
The sports palace was built from 1999 to 2001. The palace was opened by the president of Kazakhstan Nursultan Nazarbayev on March 6, 2001. The Kazakhstan Sports Palace is one of the first sports venues in Astana and is used for mass sport. The building contains a swimming pool, a health club, an ice hockey rink and many other amateur sports clubs. Until 2008 the hockey arena was used for multi-purpose events, such as boxing and basketball events. Until 2015, the arena hosted home games for Barys Astana.

The sports palace was reconstructed for hosting Men's ice hockey tournament of the 2011 Asian Winter Games. Ice hockey preliminaries actually started two days before the Opening Ceremony of the Games on 30 January. The matches played in the main and newly built minor arena with 1,200 seats. Currently, the minor arena is the home arena for HC Astana of the Kazakhstan Hockey Championship.

In 2011, Kontinental Hockey League commissioners declared that this arena is one of the worst in the league. The main reason is the low capacity. Barys Astana managers decided to build the new Barys Arena with 12,000 seats. It opened for the 2015-16 KHL season.

== See also ==
- List of Kontinental Hockey League arenas

Preceded by first arena	Home of the Barys Astana; 2001 – 2015	Succeeded by Barys Arena
