= Vadim Yermolayev =

Russian ice hockey player

- Born: February 14, 1989 (age 36) Magnitogorsk, Russian SFSR, Soviet Union
- Height: 5 ft 11 in (180 cm)
- Weight: 181 lb (82 kg; 12 st 13 lb)
- Position: Left wing
- Shoots: Right
- Kazakh team Former teams: Beibarys Atyrau; Metallurg Magnitogorsk; Barys Astana
- Playing career: 2007–present

Vadim Leonidovich Yermolayev (Russian: Вадим Леонидович Ермолаев; born 14 February 1989) is a Russian professional ice hockey forward who currently plays for Beibarys Atyrau of the Kazakhstan Hockey Championship.

He previously played in the Russian Superleague and the Kontinental Hockey League for Metallurg Magnitogorsk and Barys Astana.
