= Denis Bachurin =

Russian ice hockey player

- Born: June 7, 1991 (age 33); Novosibirsk, Russia
- Height: 6 ft 1 in (185 cm)
- Weight: 214 lb (97 kg; 15 st 4 lb)
- Position: Defenceman
- Shoots: Left
- KAZ team Former teams: HC Astana; HC Almaty; Barys Astana
- NHL draft: Undrafted
- Playing career: 2012–present

Denis Dmitrievich Bachurin (Russian: Денис Дмитриевич Бачурин; born June 7, 1991) a Russian professional ice hockey defenceman who currently plays for HC Almaty of the Kazakhstan Hockey Championship.
