= Andrei Spiridonov =

Kazakhstani ice hockey player

- Born: May 21, 1982 (age 42); Ust-Kamenogorsk, Kazakh SSR, Soviet Union
- Height: 5 ft 10 in (178 cm)
- Weight: 192 lb (87 kg; 13 st 10 lb)
- Position: Centre
- Shoots: Left
- KAZ team Former teams: HK Almaty; Barys Astana (KHL)
- National team: Kazakhstan
- NHL draft: Undrafted
- Playing career: 2007–present

Andrei Vladimirovich Spiridonov (Russian: Андрей Владимирович Спиридонов; born 21 May 1982) is a Kazakhstani professional ice hockey player. He is currently playing with the HK Almaty of the Kazakhstan Hockey Championship.

He previously played for Barys Astana of the Kontinental Hockey League (KHL).

== International ==
He participated at the 2010 IIHF World Championship as a member of the Kazakhstan men's national ice hockey team.

Spiridonov was named to the Kazakhstan men's national ice hockey team for competition at the 2014 IIHF World Championship.
