= Alexander Achziger =

Kazakhstani ice hockey coach

- Born: Alexander Achziger; January 5, 1953 (age 72); Akmolinsk, Kazakh SSR, USSR
- Occupation: ice hockey coach

Alexander Ivanovich Achziger (Russian: Александр Иванович Ахцигер, born January 5) is a Kazakhstani-German professional ice hockey coach. He is currently the assistant coach of Kazakhstan men's national ice hockey team and KHL team Barys Astana.
