= Konstantin Rudenko =

Kazakhstani-Russian professional ice hockey winger

- Born: 23 July 1981 (age 44) Ust-Kamenogorsk, Kazakh SSR, Soviet Union
- Height: 5 ft 10 in (178 cm)
- Weight: 174 lb (79 kg; 12 st 6 lb)
- Position: Left wing
- Shot: Right
- Played for: SKA Saint Petersburg; Lokomotiv Yaroslavl; Atlant Moscow Oblast; Barys Astana
- National team: Kazakhstan
- NHL draft: 160th overall, 1999; Philadelphia Flyers
- Playing career: 1997–2016

Konstantin Valerievich Rudenko (Russian: Константин Валерьевич Руде́нко; born 23 July 1981) is a former Kazakhstani-Russian professional ice hockey winger who played in the Russian Superleague and Kontinental Hockey League (KHL). He was selected by the Philadelphia Flyers in the 6th round (160th overall) of the 1999 NHL entry draft.

== Playing career ==
Rudenko has spent 13 seasons playing in Russia. After his initial season with SKA Saint Petersburg in 1999–2000, where he posted one goal and one assist in 20 games, Rudenko joined with Lokomotiv Yaroslavl. The winger spent 11 seasons with the team registering 64 goals and 96 assists in 350 games for club, as he was part of the 2002 and 2003 Russian Superleague Championship teams.

Luckily for Rudenko, he signed with Atlant Moscow Oblast in July 2011, two months before the 2011 Lokomotiv Yaroslavl plane crash. In his lone season with Atlant, Rudenko had five goals and six assists in 35 contests. In July 2012 he signed a contract with Barys Astana.

== Career statistics ==
			Regular season					Playoffs
Season	Team	League	GP	G	A	Pts	PIM	GP	G	A	Pts	PIM
1999–00	SKA Saint Petersburg	RSL	20	1	1	2	8	1	0	0	0	0
2000–01	Lokomotiv Yaroslavl	RSL	18	2	3	5	28	9	2	1	3	8
2001–02	Lokomotiv Yaroslavl	RSL	8	0	2	2	12	1	0	0	0	0
2002–03	Lokomotiv Yaroslavl	RSL	20	3	4	7	20	2	0	0	0	0
2003–04	Lokomotiv Yaroslavl	RSL	43	10	12	22	18	3	0	0	0	0
2004–05	Lokomotiv Yaroslavl	RSL	21	1	0	1	8	2	0	0	0	0
2005–06	Lokomotiv Yaroslavl	RSL	49	11	17	28	55	11	1	2	3	0
2006–07	Lokomotiv Yaroslavl	RSL	35	11	8	19	30	7	2	2	4	6
2007–08	Lokomotiv Yaroslavl	RSL	46	6	16	22	28	7	0	1	1	8
2008–09	Lokomotiv Yaroslavl	KHL	48	10	18	28	26	19	4	8	12	24
2009–10	Lokomotiv Yaroslavl	KHL	31	3	7	10	4	17	5	6	11	24
2010–11	Lokomotiv Yaroslavl	KHL	31	7	11	18	24	11	0	4	4	0
2011–12	Atlant Moscow Oblast	KHL	33	5	6	11	19	11	0	1	1	6
2012–13	Barys Astana	KHL	47	14	17	31	65	7	1	2	3	0
2013–14	Barys Astana	KHL	51	9	18	27	32	10	3	5	8	8
2014–15	Barys Astana	KHL	60	9	13	22	92	7	1	3	4	6
2015–16	Barys Astana	KHL	13	1	2	3	2	–	–	–	–	–
RSL totals			260	45	63	108	207	43	5	6	11	22
KHL totals			314	58	92	150	264	82	14	29	43	68
