= Vitali Novopashin =

Kazakhstani ice hockey player

- Born: September 28, 1978 (age 47) Ust-Kamenogorsk, Kazakh SSR, Soviet Union
- Height: 5 ft 10 in (178 cm)
- Weight: 185 lb (84 kg; 13 st 3 lb)
- Position: Defence
- Shot: Right
- KHL team Former teams: Atlant Moscow Oblast; Torpedo Ust-Kamenogorsk; Torpedo Nizhny Novgorod; Salavat Yulaev Ufa; Metallurg Novokuznetsk; Barys Astana
- National team: Kazakhstan
- NHL draft: Undfrafted
- Playing career: 1998–2015

Vitali Novopashin
Medal record

Men's ice hockey

Representing Kazakhstan

Asian Games
Gold medal – first place	1999 Gangwon	Ice hockey
Gold medal – first place	2011 Astana-Almaty	Ice hockey

Vitali Nikolayevich Novopashin (Russian: Виталий Николаевич Новопа́шин; born September 28, 1978) is a Kazakhstani former professional ice hockey defenceman who last played for Atlant Moscow Oblast of the Kontinental Hockey League (KHL).

Novopashin previously spent the majority of his career with Torpedo Nizhny Novgorod and has also played for Salavat Yulaev Ufa, Metallurg Novokuznetsk and Barys Astana.
