= Jon Mirasty =

Canadian hockey player (born 1982)

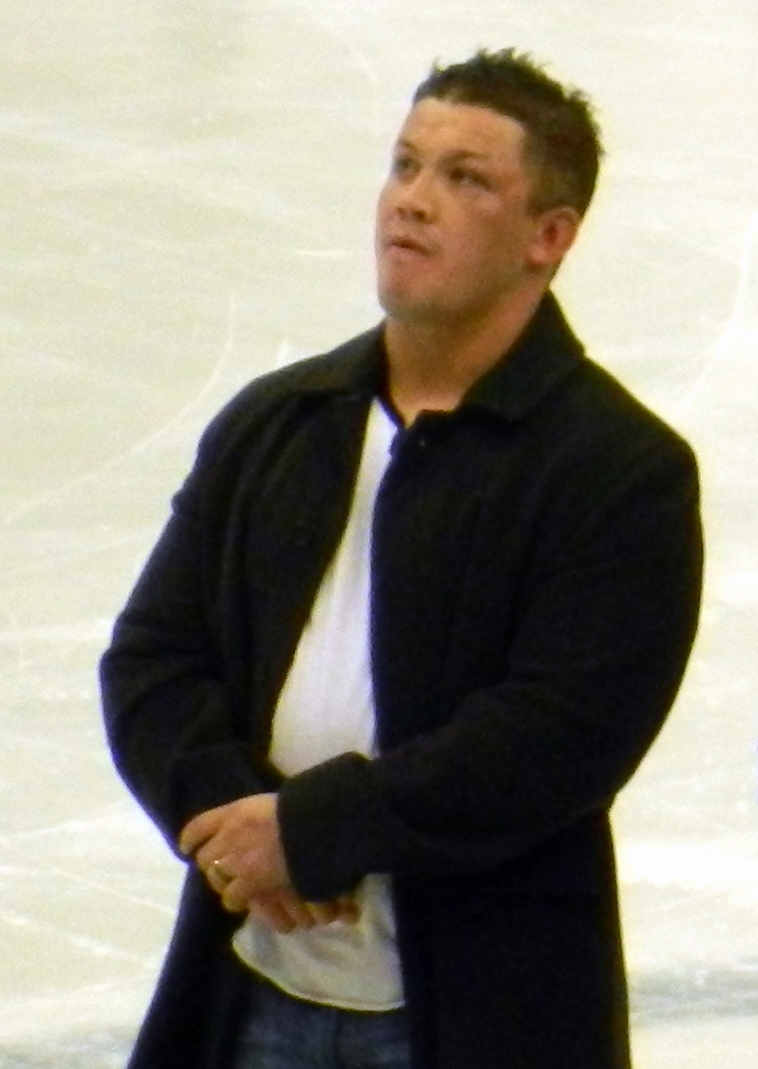
- Mirasty in 2014
- Born: June 4, 1982 (age 44) Meadow Lake, Saskatchewan, Canada
- Height: 5 ft 10 in (178 cm)
- Weight: 220 lb (100 kg; 15 st 10 lb)
- Position: Left wing
- Shot: Left
- Played for: KHL; Barys Astana; HC Vityaz; CHL; Fort Wayne Komets; ECHL; Elmira Jackals; Greenville Grrrowl; Bakersfield Condors; AHL; Syracuse Crunch; LNAH; Sorel-Tracy Mission; Sorel-Tracy Éperviers; United Hockey League; Danbury Trashers
- NHL draft: Undrafted
- Playing career: 2003–2023

Jonathon Gary Frank Mirasty (born June 4, 1982) is a Cree Canadian former professional ice hockey player who has played in multiple leagues including the KHL, AHL, and ECHL. Nicknamed "Nasty" by both teammates and fans, Mirasty developed a cult following throughout his career due to his Mohawk hairstyle and his laughing during his fights.

== Playing career ==
Mirasty started his career playing junior ice hockey for various teams in the SJHL, WHL, and MJHL from 1999 to 2003.

Upon turning professional, Mirasty signed with the Bakersfield Condors of the ECHL in 2003. In 2004, he played two games for ECHL teams but spent the majority of the season playing for the Sorel-Tracy Mission of the LNAH. From 2005 to 2007, he played for both the Mission and also the Danbury Trashers of the UHL.

After playing low-level pro-hockey for several years, Mirasty originally planned on retiring from hockey in 2006. Instead, in 2007, Mirasty was soon given a chance to play for the Syracuse Crunch of the AHL, a minor-league affiliate of the Columbus Blue Jackets, where he appeared in a number of NHL exhibition games while continuing to compete for the minor league team over the next four seasons.

Mirasty finished the 2010-11 regular season with the Fort Wayne Komets after starting it with the Elmira Jackals; he was left off the playoff roster, however. Following this, he left North America and played two seasons for KHL teams in Russia and Kazakhstan.

After returning to North America, Mirasty played a few more years playing low level professional hockey; his last season with significant professional playing time was during the 2014–15 season in the LNAH and he last appeared in a professional game in any capacity during the 2022–23 season for the Binghamton Black Bears of the FPHL. Since 2015, Mirasty has primarily played senior hockey.

== Mixed martial arts ==
In his youth Mirasty competed in boxing and was provincial and golden gloves champion in 1998 and 1999. Mirasty made his professional MMA debut against Sebastian Gauthier in 2007 as part of TKO Major League MMA, losing in the first round during TKO 29: Repercussion in Montreal.

== Acting career ==
He made his acting debut as a hockey player in the television series Shoresy.

== Personal life ==
Mirasty, a Cree Canadian Indian, is a distant cousin of teammate Jeremy Yablonski. Mirasty is married to Janessa Mirasty and has three children, son Triston and daughters Ava and Bexlee. When not playing hockey, or coaching his son, Mirasty spends time breaking and training horses on his ranch in Meadow Lake.

After playing over nine seasons professionally, Mirasty saw a future in business and opened up his town's first Tim Hortons within a 90-mile radius. However, four months into the operation Mirasty and his family were forced to sell in 2016 due to personal health problems Mirasty was facing.

In March 2023, Mirasty was elected as a council member of the Flying Dust First Nation; his grandfather, Frank, was once the chief of the Flying Dust First Nation. Mirasty learned the Cree language from his grandparents and self-estimates a 70% proficiency in speaking it.
