= Vitali Yeremeyev =

Kazakhstani ice hockey player

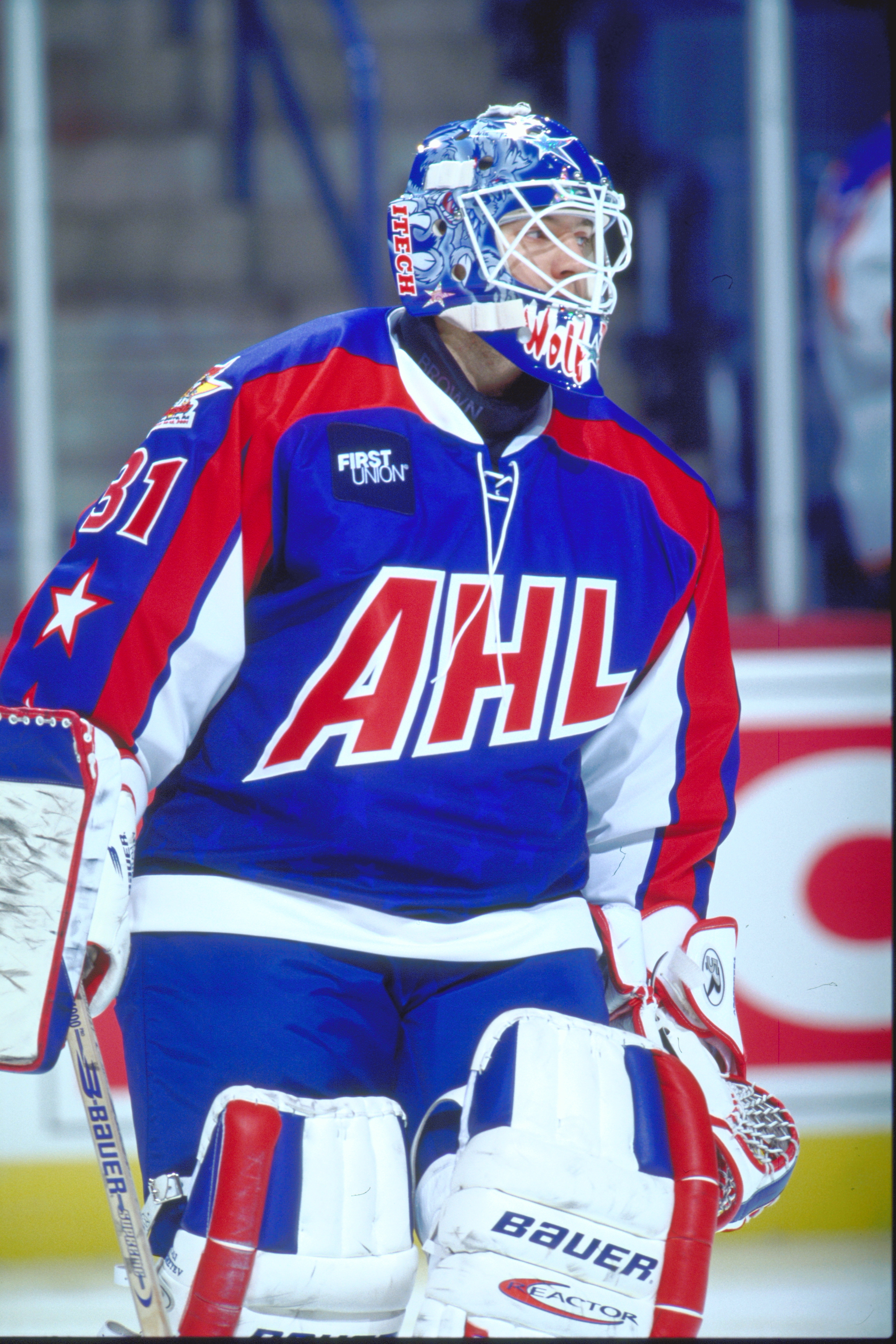
- Yeremeyev in 2001
- Born: September 23, 1975 (age 50) Ust-Kamenogorsk, Kazakh SSR, USSR
- Height: 5 ft 10 in (178 cm)
- Weight: 167 lb (76 kg; 11 st 13 lb)
- Position: Goaltender
- Caught: Left
- Played for: Torpedo Ust-Kamenogorsk; CSKA Moscow; Lokomotiv Yaroslavl; Dynamo Moscow; New York Rangers; Barys Astana
- National team: Kazakhstan
- NHL draft: 209th overall, 1994; New York Rangers
- Playing career: 1992–2014

Vitali Mikhailovich Yeremeyev (Russian: Виталий Михайлович Еремеев; born September 23, 1975) is a Kazakhstani former professional ice hockey goaltender. He played 4 games in the National Hockey League with the New York Rangers during the 2000–01 season. The rest of his career, which lasted from 1992 to 2014, was spent in the Russian Superleague and Kontinental Hockey League. Internationally Yeremeyev played for the Kazakhstani national team at several World Championships and the 1998 and 2006 Winter Olympics.

== Playing career ==
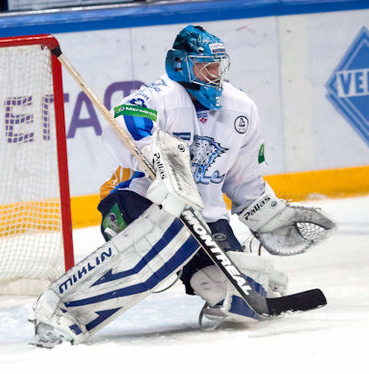
Yeremeyev with Barys Astana in 2011.

Yeremeyev was drafted in the 9th round (209th overall) in the 1994 NHL entry draft by the New York Rangers after his third season with Torpedo Ust-Kamenogorsk in which he won the Kazakhstan Hockey Championship's award for best goalie. He then played three seasons with CSKA Moscow, posting an incredible 1.66 GAA in 25 games during 1995-96. He bounced around the leagued a bit for the next few seasons, playing with Lokomotiv Yaroslavl and CSKA Moscow before landing with Dynamo Moscow.

In 2000, he powered the club to a league title, posting a 1.24 GAA in 26 games during the regular season, and a stunning 1.27 GAA during the playoffs. The next year, he got a shot at the National Hockey League with the Rangers, but was unable to replicate his performance and returned to Russia with Dynamo Moscow.

In 2004-05, he won the Russian Superleague title again with Moscow, as well as the league's award for best goalie. Impressively, he managed to post an even better GAA in this season's playoff effort, starting 10 games and averaging just .90 goals against per game. He played another five years with Dynamo Moscow, until he was traded to Barys Astana in 2010.

== International play ==
Medal record

Ice hockey

Representing Kazakhstan

Asian Games
Gold medal – first place	2011 Astana-Almaty	Ice hockey

Yeremeyev has competed for Kazakhstan more times than any other goalie in the country's history by far. In the 1994 World Championships, he was Evgeni Nabokov's teammate for the three years with Torpedo Ust-Kamenogorsk as well as the lone international competition that Nabokov represented Kazakhstan. He has competed at two Olympics as well as 10 World Championships.

Yeremeyev's top international performance came at the 1998 Winter Olympics, where he carried an upstart Kazakhstan team all the way to the quarterfinals where Team Canada beat them 4–1.

== Career statistics ==
=== Regular season and playoffs ===
			Regular season										Playoffs
Season	Team	League	GP	W	L	T	OTL	MIN	GA	SO	GAA	SV%	GP	W	L	MIN	GA	SO	GAA	SV%
1991–92	Torpedo Ust-Kamengorsk-2	USSR-3	—	—	—	—	—	—	—	—	—	—	—	—	—	—	—	—	—	—
1991–92	Torpedo Ust-Kamengorsk	USSR	—	—	—	—	—	—	—	—	—	—	1	—	—	—	—	—	—	—
1992–93	Torpedo Ust-Kamengorsk-2	RUS-2	28	—	—	—	—	—	—	—	—	—	—	—	—	—	—	—	—	—
1992–93	Torpedo Ust-Kamengorsk	RUS	2	—	—	—	—	120	12	0	6.00	—	—	—	—	—	—	—	—	—
1993–94	Torpedo Ust-Kamengorsk	RUS	19	—	—	—	—	1015	38	—	2.24	—	—	—	—	—	—	—	—	—
1994–95	CSKA Moscow	RUS	49	—	—	—	—	2733	97	7	2.13	—	2	—	—	120	8	—	4.00	—
1995–96	CSKA Moscow	RUS	25	—	—	—	—	1339	37	5	1.66	—	3	—	—	179	7	0	2.34	.936
1995–96	CSKA Moscow-2	RUS-2	10	—	—	—	—	—	—	—	—	—	—	—	—	—	—	—	—	—
1996–97	CSKA Moscow	RSL	14	—	—	—	—	635	35	0	3.31	—	1	—	—	59	3	0	3.05	—
1997–98	Torpedo Yaroslavl	RSL	17	—	—	—	—	979	19	3	1.16	—	4	1	2	—	—	—	2.38	—
1997–98	Torpedo Yaroslavl-2	RUS-2	2	—	—	—	—	—	4	—	—	—	—	—	—	—	—	—	—	—
1998–99	CSKA Moscow	RSL	19	11	5	1	—	1100	33	4	1.16	—	—	—	—	—	—	—	—	—
1999–00	Dynamo Moscow	RSL	26	17	5	3	—	1564	32	7	1.23	.937	17	13	4	1039	22	4	1.27	.941
2000–01	New York Rangers	NHL	4	0	4	0	—	213	16	0	4.52	.846	—	—	—	—	—	—	—	—
2000–01	Hartford Wolf Pack	AHL	36	16	15	3	—	1977	98	2	2.97	.903	—	—	—	—	—	—	—	—
2000–01	Charlotte Checkers	ECHL	5	3	2	0	—	298	21	0	4.23	.898	—	—	—	—	—	—	—	—
2001–02	Charlotte Checkers	ECHL	3	1	2	0	—	179	9	0	3.01	.878	—	—	—	—	—	—	—	—
2001–02	Dynamo Moscow	RSL	20	10	7	3	—	1219	33	3	1.62	.932	3	0	3	177	11	0	3.73	.861
2002–03	Dynamo Moscow	RSL	32	15	9	5	—	1836	65	4	2.12	.921	5	2	3	—301	12	0	2.39	.918
2003–04	Dynamo Moscow	RSL	45	20	14	10	—	2745	86	6	1.88	.918	1	0	0	31	0	0	0.00	1.000
2004–05	Dynamo Moscow	RSL	27	21	3	2	—	1595	33	9	1.24	.948	10	8	1	—599	9	3	0.90	.966
2005–06	Dynamo Moscow	RSL	26	11	10	—	4	1561	50	3	1.92	.928	4	1	3	260	0	1	2.30	.933
2006–07	Dynamo Moscow	RSL	34	16	12	—	2	1947	78	2	2.40	.916	3	0	4	179	11	0	3.69	.861
2007–08	Dynamo Moscow	RSL	36	15	19	—	0	—	—	3	2.29	.920	8	4	3	—	—	0	2.61	.904
2008–09	Dynamo Moscow	KHL	32	22	7	—	2	1859	69	2	2.23	.904	12	8	4	—	—	1	1.63	.927
2009–10	Dynamo Moscow	KHL	33	16	11	—	2	1770	70	4	2.37	.920	4	1	3	—	—	0	2.61	.915
2010–11	Barys Astana	KHL	35	15	15	—	4	2035	78	2	2.30	.927	2	0	2	119	7	0	3.53	.910
2011–12	Barys Astana	KHL	32	15	11	—	2	1703	70	2	2.47	.925	7	3	4	424	17	0	2.41	.925
2012–13	Barys Astana	KHL	23	12	7	—	2	1249	64	2	3.07	.897	4	2	2	254	12	0	2.84	.915
2013–14	Barys Astana	KHL	20	9	8	—	1	1132	58	0	3.07	.901	10	6	4	576	22	0	2.29	.920
NHL totals			4	0	4	0	—	213	16	0	4.52	.846	—	—	—	—	—	—	—	—

=== International ===
Year	Team	Event	GP	W	L	T	MIN	GA	SO	GAA	SV%
1994	Kazakhstan	WC-C	4	—	—	—	—	6	—	1.64	.931
1995	Kazakhstan	WC-C	3	—	—	—	—	4	—	1.50	—
1996	Kazakhstan	WC-C	7	—	—	—	—	10	—	1.53	—
1997	Kazakhstan	WC-B	6	—	—	—	—	17	—	2.92	.915
1998	Kazakhstan	OLY	7	1	3	1	292	28	0	5.76	.835
1998	Kazakhstan	WC	3	0	2	0	143	11	—	4.61	.876
1999	Kazakhstan	WC-B	3	—	—	—	145	5	1	2.07	.953
2004	Kazakhstan	WC	5	1	3	1	221	12	1	3.26	.887
2006	Kazakhstan	OLY	3	1	2	0	180	10	0	3.33	.914
2010	Kazakhstan	WC	5	0	5	0	300	21	0	4.20	.850
2011	Kazakhstan	WC-I	4	4	0	0	243	6	0	1.49	.925
2012	Kazakhstan	WC	4	0	3	0	181	12	0	4.00	.892
2014	Kazakhstan	WC	4	0	3	0	197	12	0	3.65	.890
WC and OLY totals			31	3	21	2	1514	106	1	4.20	—

== Awards and achievements ==
- Russian Superleague: 1999–00, 2004–05 (with Dynamo Moscow)
- IIHF European Champions Cup: 2006 (with Dynamo Moscow)
- Spengler Cup: 2008 (with Dynamo Moscow)
- Golden Helmet Award: 1999–00, 2004–05
