= Alexei Litvinenko =

Soviet ice hockey player (born 1980)

- Born: 7 March 1980 (age 46) Ust-Kamenogorsk, Kazakh SSR, Soviet Union
- Height: 6 ft 5 in (196 cm)
- Weight: 236 lb (107 kg; 16 st 12 lb)
- Position: Defence
- Shot: Left
- KHL team Former teams: Barys Astana; Kazzinc-Torpedo; HC Spartak Moscow; Metallurg Magnitogorsk; SKA St. Petersburg; HC Dynamo Moscow; Vityaz Chekhov
- National team: Kazakhstan
- NHL draft: 262nd overall, 1999; Phoenix Coyotes
- Playing career: 1999–2016

Medal record

Men's ice hockey

Representing Kazakhstan

Asian Games
Gold medal – first place	1999 Gangwon	Ice hockey
Gold medal – first place	2011 Astana-Almaty	Ice hockey

Alexei Nikolaevich Litvinenko (Russian: Алексей Николаевич Литвине́нко; born 7 March 1980) is a Kazakh retired ice hockey defenceman. He last played for Barys Astana in the Kontinental Hockey League. He was drafted 262nd overall by the Phoenix Coyotes in the 9th round of the 1999 NHL entry draft.

He participated at the 2010 IIHF World Championship as a member of the Kazakhstan men's national ice hockey team.

== Career statistics ==
			Regular season					Playoffs
Season	Team	League	GP	G	A	Pts	PIM	GP	G	A	Pts	PIM
1997–98	Torpedo UST-Kamenogorsk	Russia3	12	0	0	0	8	—	—	—	—	—
1998–99	Torpedo UST-Kamenogorsk	Russia2	4	0	0	0	0	—	—	—	—	—
1998–99	Torpedo UST-Kamenogorsk-2	Russia3	31	3	4	7	52	—	—	—	—	—
1999–00	Torpedo UST-Kamenogorsk	Russia3	12	2	4	6	12	—	—	—	—	—
1999–00	HC Dynamo Moscow	Russia	7	0	0	0	4	—	—	—	—	—
1999–00	HC Dynamo Moscow-2	Russia3	4	0	3	3	14	—	—	—	—	—
2000–01	Dynamo-Energiya Yekaterinburg	Russia	26	0	0	0	42	—	—	—	—	—
2000–01	Dynamo-Energiya Yekaterinburg-2	Russia3	3	1	2	3	2	—	—	—	—	—
2000–01	HC Dynamo Moscow	Russia	5	0	0	0	0	—	—	—	—	—
2001–02	Metallurg Magnitogorsk	Russia	20	0	3	3	31	9	1	1	2	20
2002–03	Metallurg Magnitogorsk	Russia	21	0	2	2	28	—	—	—	—	—
2002–03	Metallurg Magnitogorsk-2	Russia3	17	4	8	12	34	—	—	—	—	—
2003–04	Metallurg Magnitogorsk	Russia	7	0	0	0	8	—	—	—	—	—
2003–04	Metallurg Magnitogorsk-2	Russia3	38	15	21	36	85	—	—	—	—	—
2004–05	Metallurg Magnitogorsk	Russia	3	0	0	0	2	—	—	—	—	—
2004–05	Metallurg Magnitogorsk-2	Russia3	16	2	9	11	26	—	—	—	—	—
2004–05	SKA Saint Petersburg	Russia	24	0	0	0	34	—	—	—	—	—
2004–05	SKA Saint Petersburg-2	Russia3	5	1	1	2	4	—	—	—	—	—
2005–06	HC Spartak Moscow	Russia	50	4	4	8	54	3	1	0	1	0
2005–06	HC Spartak Moscow-2	Russia3	1	0	0	0	0	—	—	—	—	—
2006–07	Metallurg Magnitogorsk	Russia	18	2	3	5	28	—	—	—	—	—
2007–08	Metallurg Magnitogorsk-2	Russia3	18	7	6	13	24	—	—	—	—	—
2007–08	HC Spartak Moscow	Russia	9	0	0	0	18	—	—	—	—	—
2007–08	HC Spartak Moscow-2	Russia3	19	1	6	7	94	—	—	—	—	—
2008–09	Vityaz Chekhov	KHL	30	0	3	3	88	—	—	—	—	—
2009–10	Vityaz Chekhov	KHL	51	6	4	10	181	—	—	—	—	—
2010–11	Barys Astana	KHL	9	0	1	1	24	—	—	—	—	—
2010–11	Barys Astana-2	Kazakhstan	2	0	1	1	0	1	0	0	0	4
2011–12	Barys Astana	KHL	29	1	2	3	34	7	0	1	1	2
2012–13	Barys Astana	KHL	52	6	11	17	77	2	1	0	1	0
2013–14	Barys Astana	KHL	48	2	7	9	62	9	0	1	1	8
2014–15	Barys Astana	KHL	2	0	0	0	2	7	0	1	1	6
2015–16	Barys Astana	KHL	28	0	2	2	28	—	—	—	—	—
2015–16	Nomad Astana	Kazakhstan	12	1	0	1	6	5	1	1	2	12
KHL totals			249	15	30	45	496	25	1	3	4	16
Russia totals			190	6	12	18	249	12	2	1	3	20
