= Mikhail Grigoryev =

Russian ice hockey player (born 1991)

- Born: February 1, 1991 (age 34); Tyumen, Russian SFSR, Soviet Union
- Height: 5 ft 10 in (178 cm)
- Weight: 187 lb (85 kg; 13 st 5 lb)
- Position: Defence
- Shoots: Right
- KHL team Former teams: Free Agent; Salavat Yulaev Ufa; Barys Astana; Torpedo Nizhny Novgorod; Lokomotiv Yaroslavl; Admiral Vladivostok; Avangard Omsk; Spartak Moscow; Dynamo Moscow; Metallurg Magnitogorsk
- Playing career: 2007–present

Mikhail Grigoryev (Russian: Михаил Петрович Григорьев; born February 1, 1991) is a Russian professional ice hockey defenceman who is currently an unrestricted free agent. He most recently played for Barys Astana of the Kontinental Hockey League (KHL).

== Playing career ==
Grigoryev, began his professional career in 2007 in Khimik Moscow Oblast, speaking before for his farm club. Before the start of the season 2007–08, he signed a contract with Neftyanik from Leninogorsk. The next season Grygoryev also held in the Russian Major League club in the Orsk Yuzhny Ural. As a junior, Salavat Yulaev Ufa drafted him 45th overall in the 2009 KHL Junior Draft.

== Awards & Achievements ==
- Bronze medalist KHL 2010
- Bronze medalist MHL (2): 2010, 2011
- Gagarin Cup Winner 2011
