= Snezhnye Barsy =

- City: Astana, Kazakhstan
- League: MHL
- Conference: Eastern
- Founded: 2011
- Home arena: Kazakhstan Sports Palace
- Colors
- Owner(s): Kazakhstan Temir Zholy
- Head coach: Alexander Istomin
- Affiliates: Barys Astana (KHL); Nomad Astana (Kazakhstan Hockey Championship)
- Website: Official page

Snezhnye Barsy (Kazakh: Қар Барыстары Астана, Qar Barystary Astana; Russian: Снежные Барсы; English: Snow Leopards) is a junior ice hockey team from Astana, Kazakhstan, which consists of players from the Barys Astana academy. They compete in the MHL.

== Season-by-season record ==
Note: GP = Games played, W = Wins, L = Losses, OTW = Overtime/shootout wins, OTL = Overtime/shootout losses, Pts = Points, GF = Goals for, GA = Goals against

Season	GP	W	L	OTW	OTL	Pts	GF	GA	Finish	Playoffs
2011–12	60	20	23	11	6	88	135	132	5th, Central	Did not qualify
2012–13	60	15	37	5	3	58	140	205	12th, Eastern	Did not qualify
2013–14	56	21	26	4	5	76	141	163	8th, Ural-Sibir	Lost in Conference Quarterfinals, 0–3 (Mamonty Yugry)
2014–15	52	25	18	4	5	88	180	152	4th, Ural-Sibir	Lost in Conference Quarterfinals, 2–3 (Stalnye Lisy)
2015–16	44	20	15	3	6	72	133	95	2nd, Ural-Sibir	Lost in Conference Semifinals, 2–3 (Chaika)
2016–17	60	12	37	7	4	54	139	181	13th, Eastern	Did not qualify

== Head coaches ==
- Galym Mambetaliyev 2011–12
- Stanislav Frolov 2012–13
- Galym Mambetaliyev 2013–2017
- Sergei Starygin 2017–2020
- Alexander Istomin 2020–
