= Konstantin Romanov (ice hockey) =

Kazakhstani-Russian ice hockey player (born 1985)

- Born: March 14, 1985 (age 41) Moscow, Soviet Union
- Height: 6 ft 0 in (183 cm)
- Weight: 181 lb (82 kg; 12 st 13 lb)
- Position: Right wing
- Shoots: Left
- KHL team Former teams: Barys Astana; Dynamo Moscow
- National team: Kazakhstan
- NHL draft: Undrafted
- Playing career: 2004–present

Konstantin Mikhailovich Romanov (Russian: Константин Михайлович Романов; born March 14, 1985) is a Kazakhstani-Russian professional ice hockey winger who currently plays for Barys Astana of the Kontinental Hockey League (KHL).

== Career ==
Romanov began his career with Dynamo Moscow in 2004, and had 5 points in his rookie season. He set modest career highs with 6 goals and 12 points in 2005-06, a year after winning the league championship with Dynamo. He was signed by Barys Astana in 2009, but has seen limited ice time with the club, and appeared in only 19 games during the 2009-10 season.

== International ==
Romanov was named to the Kazakhstan men's national ice hockey team for competition at the 2014 IIHF World Championship.
