= Filipp Savchenko =

Russian ice hockey player

- Born: 20 November 1991 (age 33); Ekaterinburg, Russia
- Height: 5 ft 7 in (170 cm)
- Weight: 150 lb (68 kg; 10 st 10 lb)
- Position: Forward
- Shoots: Right
- ALIH team Former teams: PSK Sakhalin; Avtomobilist Yekaterinburg; Barys Astana
- NHL draft: Undrafted
- Playing career: 2009–present

Filipp Savchenko (born 20 November 1991) is a Russian professional ice hockey forward. He is currently playing with PSK Sakhalin of Asia League Ice Hockey (ALIH).

Savchenko made his Kontinental Hockey League (KHL) debut playing with Avtomobilist Yekaterinburg during the 2010–11 KHL season.
