= Samvel Mnatsyan =

Russian ice hockey player (1990–2019)

- Born: 5 March 1990 Omsk, Russian SFSR, Soviet Union
- Died: 6 October 2019 (aged 29)
- Height: 6 ft 2 in (188 cm)
- Weight: 212 lb (96 kg; 15 st 2 lb)
- Position: Defence
- Shot: Left
- Played for: HC Kladno; Arlan Kokshetau; Barys Astana; Nomad Astana; Neftekhimik Nizhnekamsk; Admiral Vladivostok
- Playing career: 2010–2018

Samvel Mnatsyan (5 March 1990 – 6 October 2019) was a Russian professional ice hockey defenceman. Throughout his career, he competed in the Kontinental Hockey League (KHL), playing for teams such as Barys Astana, HC Neftekhimik Nizhnekamsk, and Admiral Vladivostok.

== Playing career ==
Mnatsyan started his hockey career with Avangard Omsk, his hometown club, competing for their junior and affiliate teams but never making an appearance for the senior squad. Following a season with Omskie Yastreby in the Junior Hockey League (MHL), he took his career abroad to the Czech Republic, joining HC Kladno in the Czech Extraliga for the 2010–11 Czech Extraliga season. During his time there, he played in seven games without registering any points.

In 2011, he relocated to Kazakhstan to play for Arlan Kokshetau in the Kazakhstan Hockey Championship. The next year, he advanced to the Kontinental Hockey League (KHL) by signing with Barys Astana. In 2013, Mnatsyan joined HC Neftekhimik Nizhnekamsk, where he spent two seasons, also playing part-time in the Supreme Hockey League (VHL) with Molot-Prikamye Perm and Neftyanik Almetyevsk. On June 25, 2015, he continued his KHL career by signing with Admiral Vladivostok.

After spending three seasons with Admiral Vladivostok, Mnatsyan departed the club after the 2017–18 season and signed a two-year deal with HC Sibir Novosibirsk as a free agent on 26 May 2018. Unfortunately, he was diagnosed with cancer before making an appearance for the team and died of the illness on 6 October 2019.

=== Regular season and playoffs ===
			Regular season					Playoffs
Season	Team	League	GP	G	A	Pts	PIM	GP	G	A	Pts	PIM
2007–08	Avangard Omsk-2	Russia3	39	1	4	5	18	—	—	—	—	—
2008–09	Avangard Omsk-2	Russia3	18	2	2	4	14	—	—	—	—	—
2009–10	Omskie Yastreby	MHL	49	1	6	7	113	8	0	1	1	6
2010–11	HC Kladno U20	Czech U20	38	1	3	4	41	—	—	—	—	—
2010–11	HC Kladno	Czech	7	0	0	0	6	—	—	—	—	—
2011–12	Arlan Kokshetau	Kazakhstan	40	5	10	15	68	3	0	1	1	2
2012–13	Barys Astana	KHL	16	1	0	1	17	3	0	0	0	2
2012–13	Barys Astana-2	Kazakhstan	19	4	11	15	57	—	—	—	—	—
2013–14	Neftekhimik Nizhnekamsk	KHL	17	0	1	1	6	—	—	—	—	—
2013–14	Molot-Prikamye Perm	VHL	8	1	1	2	6	—	—	—	—	—
2014–15	Neftekhimik Nizhnekamsk	KHL	6	0	0	0	4	—	—	—	—	—
2014–15	Neftyanik Almetyevsk	VHL	19	2	1	3	17	—	—	—	—	—
2015–16	Admiral Vladivostok	KHL	44	0	3	3	41	4	0	0	0	40
2016–17	Admiral Vladivostok	KHL	36	2	3	5	48	5	0	0	0	2
2017–18	Admiral Vladivostok	KHL	52	1	2	3	93	—	—	—	—	—
KHL totals			171	4	9	13	209	12	0	0	0	44
