= 2011–12 JHL season =

Russian ice hockey league season

The 2011–12 MHL season was the third season of the Russian Junior Hockey League. The league was divided into two conferences, with two eight-team divisions in each conference.

== Regular season ==
=== Western Conference ===
==== Northeast Division ====
	Club	GP	W	OTW	SOW	SOL	OTL	L	GF	GA	Pts
1.	Almaz Cherepovets	60	40	1	1	2	2	14	205	134	128
2.	Khimik Voskresensk	60	31	1	5	7	2	14	177	142	114
3.	SKA 1946 St. Petersburg	60	29	1	3	8	2	17	177	145	105
4.	HK Riga	60	23	2	7	2	1	25	153	141	90
5.	Dinamo-Shinnik Bobruisk	60	22	5	2	3	2	26	148	154	85
6.	Serebryanie Lvi St. Petersburg	60	20	3	6	1	2	28	180	193	81
7.	Yunost Minsk	60	17	2	2	5	4	30	145	208	68
8.	Tatranskí Vlci	60	14	2	3	2	2	37	140	228	56

==== Central Division ====
	Club	GP	W	OTW	SOW	SOL	OTL	L	GF	GA	Pts
1.	Mytischi Atlanty	60	30	5	4	5	1	15	209	158	114
2.	CSKA-Krasnaja Armija Moskva	60	29	3	6	4	1	17	230	156	110
3.	Amurskie Tigry Khabarovsk	60	27	2	6	4	1	20	184	158	102
4.	MHC Spartak	60	27	3	5	3	0	22	161	146	100
5.	Snezhnye Barys Astana	60	20	2	9	4	2	23	135	132	88
6.	HC MVD Jr	60	19	1	6	7	4	23	157	167	82
7.	Russkie Vityazi Chekhov	60	19	2	4	6	1	28	161	206	76
8.	Kapitan Stupino	60	16	2	4	7	2	29	162	200	69

=== Eastern Conference ===
==== Volga Division ====
	Club	GP	W	OTW	SOW	SOL	OTL	L	GF	GA	Pts
1.	Bars Kazan	60	35	0	7	5	1	12	241	162	125
2.	Tolpar Ufa	60	33	5	2	3	0	17	218	160	116
3.	Loko Yaroslavl	60	33	1	2	6	1	17	188	134	112
4.	Reaktor Nischnekamsk	60	22	1	2	7	4	24	179	208	83
5.	Chaika Nizhny Novgorod	60	23	1	2	5	2	27	151	182	82
6.	Belie Tigri Orenburg	60	20	0	1	3	0	36	158	228	65
7.	Olympia Kirovo-Chepetsk	60	15	0	2	3	1	39	153	269	53
8.	Lada Togliatti	60	9	0	9	2	4	36	141	208	51

==== Ural-Sibirien Division ====
	Club	GP	W	OTW	SOW	SOL	OTL	L	GF	GA	Pts
1.	Omskie Yastrebi	60	36	5	3	4	1	11	227	122	129
2.	Stalnie Lisy Magnitogorsk	60	34	3	3	4	0	16	260	176	118
3.	Kuznetskie Medvedi	60	28	2	9	1	5	15	218	164	112
4.	Mamonty Yugry	60	25	1	3	4	3	24	177	191	90
5.	Gazovik Tyumen	60	20	2	8	5	3	22	164	172	88
6.	Belie Medvedi Chelyabinsk	60	19	0	3	4	3	31	191	219	70
7.	Sibirskie Snaiperi Novosibirsk	60	16	1	3	3	1	36	141	220	60
8.	Avto Yekaterinburg	60	13	1	4	7	2	33	170	218	58

== Playoffs ==
1/8 finals	Quarterfinals
US1	Omskie Yastrebi	3
V4	Reaktor Nizhnekamsk	0
US1	Omskie Yastrebi	3
US3	Kuznetskie Medvedi	1
V2	Tolpar Ufa	0
US3	Kuznetskie Medvedi	3
Eastern Conference
US2	Stalnie Lisi Magnitogorsk	3
V3	Loko Yaroslavl	0
US2	Stalnie Lisi Magnitogorsk	3
US4	Mamonty Yugry	1
V1	Bars Kazan	2
US4	Mamonty Yugry	3
C1	Mytischi Atlanti	3
NW4	HK Riga	2
C1	Mytischi Atlanti	3
C3	Amurskie Tigry Khabarovsk	0
NW2	Khimik Voskresensk	2
C3	Amurskie Tigry Khabarocsk	3
Western Conference
NW1	Almaz Cherepovets	3
C4	MHC Spartak	2
NW1	Almaz Cherepovets	2
C2	CSKA-Krasnaja Armija Moskva	3
C2	CSKA-Krasnaja Armija Moskva	3
NW3	SKA 1946 St. Petersburg	2

Semifinals
US1	Omskie Yastrebi	3
US2	Stalnie Lisi Magnitogorsk	1
C1	Mytischi Atlanti	1
C2	CSKA-Krasnaja Armija Moskva	3

Final
US1	Omskie Yastrebi	4
C2	CSKA-Krasnaja Armija Moskva	1
