= 2013 IIHF World Championship Division I =

Tournament details
- Host countries: Hungary; Ukraine
- Venues: 2 (in 2 host cities)
- Dates: 14 – 20 April
- Teams: 12

The 2013 IIHF World Championship Division I was a pair of international Ice hockey tournaments run by the International Ice Hockey Federation. Group A contested in Budapest, Hungary and Group B contested in Donetsk, Ukraine, both running from 14 April to 20 April 2013. Divisions I A and I B represent the second and the third tier of the Ice Hockey World Championships.

For the third consecutive year the two nations that had been demoted from the top level, were sent right back. In Group A Kazakhstan and Italy narrowly held off Hungary to achieve promotion, who lost for the first time in their history to South Korea. The Koreans also defeated Great Britain on the final day, relegating the British, and achieving a placement of 21st overall, their best ever finish.

In Group B, Ukraine returned to Group A, Estonia returned to Division II, and the other four nations repeated their placements from 2012. The final day was dramatic though, as it featured head-to-head match-ups to determine promotion and relegation. Both Poland and Ukraine were undefeated until they met in the final game of the tournament, Ukraine came out ahead four to three. The game between the two winless Baltic nations was not as dramatic, as Lithuania scored twelve to stay in Division I.

== Division I A ==
2013 IIHF World Championship Division I A
Tournament details
- Host country: Hungary
- Venue: 1 (in 1 host city)
- Dates: 14 – 20 April 2013
- Teams: 6

Tournament statistics
- Games played: 15
- Goals scored: 79 (5.27 per game)
- Attendance: 52,533 (3,502 per game)

=== Participants ===
Team	Qualification
Italy	placed 15th in 2012 Top Division and were relegated
Kazakhstan	placed 16th in 2012 Top Division and were relegated
Hungary	hosts, placed 3rd in 2012
Japan	placed 4th in 2012
Great Britain	placed 5th in 2012
South Korea	placed 1st in 2012 Division I B and were promoted

=== Officials ===
Referees

- (Austria) Thomas Berneker
- (Belarus) Maxim Sidorenko
- (Canada) Pascal St-Jacques
- (France) Jimmy Bergamelli
- (Poland) Pawel Meszynski
- (Russia) Alexander Sergeev
- (Slovakia) Daniel Konc

Linesmen

- (Canada) Justin Hull
- (Czech Republic) Jiří Gebauer
- (Hungary) Attila Nagy
- (Hungary) Marton Németh
- (Norway) Alexander Waldejer
- (Switzerland) Joris Müller
- (United States) David Brown

=== Final standings ===
Team	Pld	W	OTW	OTL	L	GF	GA	GD	Pts	Promotion or relegation
Kazakhstan	5	4	0	0	1	18	6	+12	12	Promoted to the 2014 Top Division
Italy	5	4	0	0	1	15	6	+9	12	Promoted to the 2014 Top Division
Hungary	5	3	0	1	1	12	10	+2	10	
Japan	5	2	0	0	3	13	16	−3	6	
South Korea	5	1	1	0	3	16	19	−3	5	
Great Britain	5	0	0	0	5	5	22	−17	0	Relegated to the 2014 Division I B

Source: IIHF

=== Results ===
All times are local (CEST – UTC+2).

14 April 2013; 12:30	Japan	2–5 (1–1, 1–2, 0–2)	Kazakhstan	Sportarena, Budapest; Attendance: 802

Game reference

Yutaka Fukufuji
Goalies
Vitaly Kolesnik
Referees:
(Russia) Alexander Sergeev
(Belarus) Maxim Sidorenko
Linesmen:
(United States) David Brown
(Hungary) Marton Németh

G. Tanaka (S. Kuji) – 12:56	1–0
	1–1	17:07 – K. Savenkov
	1–2	25:44 – K. Romanov (A. Korabeinikov)
T. Kawai (A. Keller, S. Kuji) – 28:57	2–2
	2–3	39:20 – V. Alexandrov (R. Starchenko)
	2–4	55:19 – T. Zhailauov (D. Upper)
	2–5	58:20 – K. Romanov (K. Pushkarev)

14 min
Penalties
14 min
31
Shots
39

14 April 2013; 16:00	South Korea	0–4 (0–1, 0–2, 0–1)	Italy	Sportarena, Budapest; Attendance: 1,205

Game reference

Eum Hyun-Seung
Park Sung-Je
Goalies
Adam Dennis
Referees:
(Austria) Thomas Berneker
(Slovakia) Daniel Konc
Linesmen:
(Czech Republic) Jiří Gebauer
(Switzerland) Joris Müller

0–1	04:46 – D. Kostner (P. Iannone)
0–2	22:53 – D. Borrelli (T. Johnson, R. Sirianni)
0–3	38:48 – D. Borrelli (V. Rocco)
0–4	53:56 – S. Marchetti (P. Iannone, D. Kostner)

14 min
Penalties
6 min
18
Shots
38

14 April 2013; 19:30	Great Britain	2–4 (1–0, 1–3, 0–1)	Hungary	Sportarena, Budapest; Attendance: 7,304

Game reference

Stephen Murphy
Goalies
Levente Szuper
Referees:
(Poland) Pawel Meszynski
(Canada) Pascal St-Jacques
Linesmen:
(Canada) Justin Hull
(Norway) Alexander Waldejer

D. Phillips (A. Tait, P. Hill) – 16:06	1–0
	1–1	22:09 – G. Nagy (B. Ladanyi, M. Vas) (PP)
	1–2	28:12 – M. Vas (J. Vas, J. Hari)
C. Shields (R. Dowd, J. Weaver) (PP) – 30:52	2–2
	2–3	36:37 – B. Ladanyi (K. Nagy, M. Vas)
	2–4	51:52 – L. Sikorcin (A. Horváth)

8 min
Penalties
10 min
20
Shots
38

15 April 2013; 12:30	Italy	4–1 (1–0, 2–0, 1–1)	Japan	Sportarena, Budapest; Attendance: 660

Game reference

Adam Dennis
Goalies
Yutaka Fukufuji
Referees:
(France) Jimmy Bergamelli
(Russia) Alexander Sergeev
Linesmen:
(Canada) Justin Hull
(Norway) Alexander Waldejer

D. Borrelli (T. Johnson, R. Sirianni) – 01:23	1–0
A. Hofer (A. Bernard, C. Borgatello) – 28:58	2–0
P. Iannone (A. Bernard, T. Johnson) – 34:54	3–0
P. Iannone (A. Hofer, N. Fontanive) (PP) – 45:25	4–0
	4–1	48:07 – G. Tanaka (S. Kuji)

12 min
Penalties
14 min
35
Shots
23

15 April 2013; 16:00	Kazakhstan	5–0 (2–0, 1–0, 2–0)	Great Britain	Sportarena, Budapest; Attendance: 1,778

Game reference

Vitaly Kolesnik
Goalies
Stephen Murphy
Referees:
(Austria) Thomas Berneker
(Canada) Pascal St-Jacques
Linesmen:
(Czech Republic) Jiří Gebauer
(Hungary) Attila Nagy

K. Romanov (K. Pushkarev, A. Spiridonov) – 17:42	1–0
I. Solarev (M. Belyayev) – 18:01	2–0
R. Savchenko (D. Upper) (PP2) – 39:52	3–0
V. Krasnoslobodtsev (R. Savchenko, T. Zhailauov) – 41:52	4–0
Y. Blokhin (V. Alexandrov, R. Starchenko) (PP) – 51:20	5–0

18 min
Penalties
14 min
33
Shots
36

15 April 2013; 19:30	Hungary	4–5 GWS (3–0, 1–1, 0–3) (OT 0–0) (SO: 0–1)	South Korea	Sportarena, Budapest; Attendance: 7,370

Game reference

Miklós Rajna
Goalies
Eum Hyun-Seung
Park Sung-Je
Referees:
(Slovakia) Daniel Konc
(Belarus) Maxim Sidorenko
Linesmen:
(United States) David Brown
(Switzerland) Joris Müller

L. Sikorcin (Á. Mihály, A. Benk) – 02:06	1–0
I. Bartalis (I. Sofron, B. Ladanyi) – 03:39	2–0
J. Hari (J. Vas) – 13:44	3–0
	3–1	25:35 – Kwon T-A. (Yoon J-M., Kim H-E.)
J. Vas (I. Bartalis, L. Sikorcin) (PP) – 26:45	4–1
	4–2	40:56 – Kim K-S. (Kim D-H., B. Radunske)
	4–3	45:32 – Kim W-J. (Sin S-W., Lee S-Y.)
	4–4	49:21 – Shin S-H. (Park W-S.) (PP)

M. Vas
B. Ladanyi (miss)
I. Sofron (miss)
Shootout
B. Radunske
(miss) Shin S-H.
Kim K-S.
16 min
Penalties
10 min
29
Shots
27

17 April 2013; 12:30	South Korea	5–6 (0–1, 3–3, 2–2)	Japan	Sportarena, Budapest; Attendance: 625

Game reference

Eum Hyun-Seung
Goalies
Yutaka Fukufuji
Referees:
(Belarus) Maxim Sidorenko
(Canada) Pascal St. Jacques
Linesmen:
(Hungary) Attila Nagy
(Norway) Alexandr Waldejer

	0–1	11:02 – T. Suzuki (T. Kawai, A. Keller) (PP)
Kim K-S. (B. Radunske, Kim D-H.) (PP) – 28:02	1–1
	1–2	29:57 – S. Kuji A. Keller, G. Tanaka) (PP)
Shin S-H. (Lee Y-J.) – 31:16	2–2
	2–3	33:30 – T. Kawai (G. Tanaka, S. Kuji) (PP)
	2–4	34:05 – K. Mitamura (H. Sato, Y. Haga)
B. Radunske (Kim K-S., Kim S-W.) (PP2) – 36:36	3–4
Shin S-H. (Cho M-H., Kim S-W.) – 44:30	4–4
	4–5	45:11 – M. Kawashima (Y. Osawa)
Kim W-Y. – 45:56	5–5
	5–6	50:30 – A. Keller (K. Takagi, H. Sato)

10 min
Penalties
18 min
45
Shots
24

17 April 2013; 16:00	Italy	5–1 (1–1, 1–0, 3–0)	Great Britain	Sportarena, Budapest; Attendance: 1,910

Game reference

Adam Dennis
Goalies
Stephen Murphy
Ben Browns
Referees:
(Slovakia) Daniel Konc
(Poland) Pawel Meszynski
Linesmen:
(Switzerland) Joris Müller
(Hungary) Marton Németh

N. di Casmirro (T. Johnson, R. Sirianni) – 01:01	1–0
	1–1	07:23 – R. Farmer (M. Richardson)
P. Iannone (N. Fontanive) (PP) – 21:15	2–1
V. Rocco (L. Felicetti) – 42:40	3–1
M. Gander (N. di Casmirro) – 42:53	4–1
D. Sullivan (L. Felicetti, V. Rocco) (SH) – 48:15	5–1

8 min
Penalties
12 min
35
Shots
15

17 April 2013; 19:30	Kazakhstan	1–2 (0–0, 1–1, 0–1)	Hungary	Sportarena, Budapest; Attendance: 7,863

Game reference

Vitaly Kolesnik
Goalies
Levente Szuper
Referees:
(France) Jimmy Bergamelli
(Russia) Alexander Sergeev
Linesmen:
(Czech Republic) Jiří Gebauer
(Canada) Justin Hull

	0–1	33:35 – Á. Mihály (I. Bartalis, M. Vas)
R. Starchenko (V. Alexandrov) – 36:38	1–1
	1–2	47:13 – G. Nagy (V. Tokaji) (PP)

12 min
Penalties
14 min
40
Shots
25

19 April 2013; 12:30	Kazakhstan	4–2 (3–0, 1–0, 0–2)	South Korea	Sportarena, Budapest; Attendance: 680

Game reference

Vitaly Kolesnik
Pavel Poluektov
Goalies
Park Sung-Je
Eum Hyun-Seung
Referees:
(Austria) Thomas Berneker
(Poland) Pawel Meszynski
Linesmen:
(Canada) Justin Hull
(Hungary) Marton Németh

A. Troshinski (V. Krasnoslobodtsev, T. Zhailauov) (PP) – 03:26	1–0
T. Zhailauov (V. Krasnoslobodtsev, F. Polishuk) – 12:56	2–0
R. Starchenko (D. Upper) – 14:40	3–0
R. Starchenko (R. Savchenko, V. Alexandrov) – 26:28	4–0
	4–1	45:49 – Kim W-J. (Cho M-H., Sin S-W.)
	4–2	57:12 – B. Radunske (Kim S-W.) (PP)

10 min
Penalties
8 min
44
Shots
25

19 April 2013; 16:00	Japan	4–1 (1–0, 1–0, 2–1)	Great Britain	Sportarena, Budapest; Attendance: 1,757

Game reference

Yutaka Fukufuji
Goalies
Stephen Murphy
Referees:
(France) Jimmy Bergamelli
(Slovakia) Daniel Konc
Linesmen:
(Switzerland) Joris Müller
(Hungary) Attila Nagy

N. Mizuuchi (R. Hashimoto, T. Yamashita) – 12:50	1–0
H. Ueno (SH) – 30:42	2–0
Y. Osawa (Y. Haga, K. Mitamura) – 41:15	3–0
	3–1	44:44 – R. Farmer (M. Richardson, R. Dowd)
S. Kuji (T. Suzuki, Y. Haga) – 49:45	4–1

28 min
Penalties
14 min
26
Shots
16

19 April 2013; 19:30	Hungary	1–2 (1–1, 0–0, 0–1)	Italy	Sportarena, Budapest; Attendance: 8,197

Game reference

Levante Szuper
Goalies
Adam Dennis
Referees:
(Belarus) Maxim Sidorenko
(Canada) Pascal St-Jacques
Linesmen:
(United States) David Brown
(Norway) Alexander Waldejer

	0–1	02:46 – V. Rocco (C. Borgatello)
Á. Mihály (J. Hari, B. Ladanyi) (PP) – 06:15	1–1
	1–2	50:41 – P. Iannone (D. Kostner, N. Fontanive) (PP)

12 min
Penalties
14 min
25
Shots
26

20 April 2013; 12:30	Great Britain	1–4 (1–0, 0–3, 0–1)	South Korea	Sportarena, Budapest; Attendance: 1,046

Game reference

Stephen Murphy
Goalies
Park Sung-Je
Referees:
(France) Jimmy Bergamelli
(Russia) Alexander Sergeev
Linesmen:
(United States) David Brown
(Hungary) Marton Németh

R. Dowd (D. Meyers, J. Weaver) – 04:56	1–0
	1–1	23:19 – Shin S-H. (Lee Y-J.)
	1–2	29:31 – Yoon J-M. (Kwon T-A.)
	1–3	34:24 – B. Radunske (Kim S-W., Kim K-S.)
	1–4	43:06 – Kim K-S. (Kim S-W., Lee D-K.) (PP)

14 min
Penalties
10 min
31
Shots
26

20 April 2013; 16:00	Italy	0–3 (0–1, 0–1, 0–1)	Kazakhstan	Sportarena, Budapest; Attendance: 3,689

Game reference

Andreas Bernard
Goalies
Vitaly Kolesnik
Referees:
(Poland) Pawel Meszynski
(Canada) Pascal St-Jacques
Linesmen:
(Canada) Justin Hull
(Hungary) Attila Nagy

0–1	10:54 – T. Zhailauov (R. Savchenko) (PP)
0–2	24:40 – R. Starchenko (Y. Fadeyev, D. Upper)
0–3	58:01 – R. Starchenko (D. Upper) (ENG)

22 min
Penalties
14 min
22
Shots
40

20 April 2013; 19:30	Hungary	1–0 (1–0, 0–0, 0–0)	Japan	Sportarena, Budapest; Attendance: 7,647

Game reference
Miklós Rajna	Goalies	Yutaka Fukufuji	Referees: (Austria) Thomas Berneker (Slovakia) Daniel Konc; Linesmen: (Czech Republic) Jiří Gebauer (Switzerland) Joris Müller
I. Sofron (M. Vas) (PP) – 04:05 / 1–0			Referees: (Austria) Thomas Berneker (Slovakia) Daniel Konc; Linesmen: (Czech Republic) Jiří Gebauer (Switzerland) Joris Müller
8 min	Penalties	6 min	Referees: (Austria) Thomas Berneker (Slovakia) Daniel Konc; Linesmen: (Czech Republic) Jiří Gebauer (Switzerland) Joris Müller
33	Shots	18	Referees: (Austria) Thomas Berneker (Slovakia) Daniel Konc; Linesmen: (Czech Republic) Jiří Gebauer (Switzerland) Joris Müller

=== Statistics ===
==== Top 10 scorers ====
Pos	Player	Country	GP	G	A	Pts	PIM	+/−
1	Roman Starchenko	Kazakhstan	5	5	2	7	2	+4
2	Patrick Iannone	Italy	5	4	2	6	4	+1
2	Kim Ki-sung	South Korea	5	4	2	6	0	0
4	Shuhei Kuji	Japan	5	2	4	6	0	0
5	Márton Vas	Hungary	5	1	5	6	2	+3
6	Dmitry Upper	Kazakhstan	5	0	6	6	2	+3
7	Brock Radunske	South Korea	5	3	2	5	2	−2
7	Talgat Zhailauov	Kazakhstan	5	3	2	5	4	+1
9	Balazs Ladanyi	Hungary	5	1	4	5	0	+1
10	Kim Sang-wook	South Korea	5	0	5	5	2	−1

IIHF.com

==== Goaltending leaders ====
(minimum 40% team's total ice time)

Pos	Player	Country	TOI	GA	Sv%	GAA	SO
1	Vitaly Kolesnik	Kazakhstan	274:43	4	96.77	0.87	2
2	Adam Dennis	Italy	240:00	3	96:30	0.75	1
3	Levente Szuper	Hungary	179:08	5	94.19	1.67	0
4	Park Sung-Je	South Korea	142.14	6	93.02	2.53	0
5	Yutaka Fukufuji	Japan	298:50	16	90.48	3.21	0

IIHF.com

=== Tournament awards ===
- Best players selected by the directorate:
  - Best Goalkeeper: (Italy) Adam Dennis
  - Best Defenseman: (Japan) Aaron Keller
  - Best Forward: (Italy) Patrick Iannone

IIHF.com

== Division I B ==
2013 IIHF World Championship Division I B
Tournament details
- Host country: Ukraine
- Venue: 1 (in 1 host city)
- Dates: 14 – 20 April 2013
- Teams: 6

Tournament statistics
- Games played: 15
- Goals scored: 113 (7.53 per game)
- Attendance: 30,141 (2,009 per game)

=== Participants ===
Team	Qualification
Ukraine	hosts, placed 6th in 2012 Division I A and were relegated
Poland	placed 2nd in 2012
Netherlands	placed 3rd in 2012
Romania	placed 4th in 2012
Lithuania	placed 5th in 2012
Estonia	placed 1st in 2012 Division II A and were promoted

=== Officials ===
Referees

- (United Kingdom) Michael Hicks
- (Latvia) Andris Ansons
- (Slovakia) Peter Lokšík
- (Ukraine) Maksym Urda

Linesmen

- (Belgium) Frederic Monnaie
- (Denmark) Rene Jensen
- (Italy) Ulrich Pardatscher
- (Slovakia) Martin Korba
- (Slovenia) Damir Rakovič
- (Ukraine) Anton Hladchenko
- (Ukraine) Artem Korepanov

=== Final standings ===
Team	Pld	W	OTW	OTL	L	GF	GA	GD	Pts	Promotion or relegation
Ukraine	5	4	1	0	0	30	7	+23	14	Promoted to the 2014 Division I A
Poland	5	4	0	0	1	22	9	+13	12	
Netherlands	5	3	0	1	1	19	15	+4	10	
Romania	5	2	0	0	3	12	24	−12	6	
Lithuania	5	1	0	0	4	16	22	−6	3	
Estonia	5	0	0	0	5	14	36	−22	0	Relegated to the 2014 Division II A

Source: IIHF

=== Results ===
All times are local (EEST – UTC+3).

14 April 2013; 12:00	Netherlands	5–4 (2–0, 2–3, 1–1)	Estonia	Druzhba Palace of Sports, Donetsk; Attendance: 1,324

Game reference

Martijn Oosterwijk
Goalies
Villem-Henrik Koitmaa
Referee:
(United Kingdom) Michael Hicks
Linesmen:
(Ukraine) Anton Gladchenko
(Ukraine) Artem Korepanov

M. Bruijsten (A. Demelinne, K. Bruijsten) – 00:18	1–0
S. Mason (R. Joly, D. Hagemeijer) – 02:45	2–0
	2–1	20:48 – D. Suur (M. Ivanov, A. Lukin)
	2–2	24:20 – A. Lukin (R. Rooba, M. Ivanov)
	2–3	25:37 – J. Missenjov (J. Rajevski, S. Novikov)
T. Demelinne (K. Bruijsten, M. Bruijsten) – 27:07	3–3
W. Hendriks (J-J. Natte, L. Houkes) – 28:53	4–3
	4–4	53:08 – V. Virjassov (A. Sibirtsev)
I. van den Heuvel (D. Hagemeijer, J. van Iersel) – 53:56	5–4

18 min
Penalties
10 min
24
Shots
32

14 April 2013; 15:30	Poland	5–0 (1–0, 2–0, 2–0)	Lithuania	Druzhba Palace of Sports, Donetsk; Attendance: 1,215

Game reference

Kamil Kosowski
Goalies
Mantas Armalis
Referee:
(Ukraine) Maxim Urda
Linesmen:
(Denmark) Rene Jensen
(Slovakia) Martin Korba

K. Dziubiński (P. Wajda, M. Strzyżowski) – 02:18	1–0
L. Laszkiewicz (S. Kowalówka) – 34:56	2–0
P. Dronia (K. Zapała) – 36:31	3–0
A. Bagiński (S. Kowalówka) – 45:50	4–0
K. Zapała (M. Kolusz, P. Dronia) – 57:47	5–0

6 min
Penalties
8 min
61
Shots
15

14 April 2013; 19:00	Ukraine	8–1 (1–0, 5–0, 2–1)	Romania	Druzhba Palace of Sports, Donetsk; Attendance: 3,824

Game reference

Yevhen Napnenko
Goalies
Gellert Ruczuj
Adrian Catrinoi Cornea
Referee:
(Slovakia) Peter Lokšík
Linesmen:
(Belgium) Frederic Monnaie
(Italy) Ulrich Pardatscher

O. Tymchenko (V. Lyutkevych, O. Pobiedonostsev) (PP) – 02:53	1–0
A. Hnidenko (Y. Petranhovskyi, D. Nimenko) – 23:37	2–0
A. Mikhnov (A. Bondaryev, V. Aleksyuk) – 25:16	3–0
R. Blahyi – 26:12	4–0
O. Pobiedonostsev (O. Materukhin, O. Shafarenko) – 33:01	5–0
M. Kvitchenko (S. Varlamov) – 33:57	6–0
	6–1	40:32 – Y. Pysarenko
O. Materukhin (O. Shafarenko, O. Tymchenko) – 43:29	7–1
R. Blahyi(V. Polonytsky) – 50:46	8–1

2 min
Penalties
12 min
55
Shots
13

15 April 2013; 13:00	Lithuania	3–5 (1–2, 1–2, 1–1)	Netherlands	Druzhba Palace of Sports, Donetsk; Attendance: 1,238

Game reference

Mantas Armalis
Goalies
Martijn Oosterwijk
Referee:
(Slovakia) Peter Lokšík
Linesmen:
(Belgium) Frederic Monnaie
(Slovenia) Damir Rakovič

	0–1	11:04 – I. van den Heuvel (D. Hagemeijer)
	0–2	11:41 – D. van de Velden (L. van Sloun, N. de Jong)
R. Aliukonis (D. Kulevičius, S. Kuliešius) (PP) – 17:33	1–2
	1–3	24:19 – M. Bruijsten (I. van den Heuvel, R. Joly) (PP)
D. Pliskauskas (D. Bogdziul, A. Katulis) (PP) – 29:50	2–3
	2–4	32:36 – L. van Sloun (J-J. Natte, I. van den Heuvel)
S. Kuliešius (A. Židkovas) (PP) – 54:08	3–4
	3–5	59:21 – D. Hagemeijer (ENG)

24 min
Penalties
24 min
37
Shots
37

15 April 2013; 16:30	Romania	1–6 (1–0, 0–3, 0–3)	Poland	Druzhba Palace of Sports, Donetsk; Attendance: 1,087

Game reference

Adrian Catrinoi Cornea
Gellert Ruczuj
Goalies
Przemyslaw Odrobny
Referee:
(Latvia) Andris Ansons
Linesmen:
(Ukraine) Anton Gladchenko
(Italy) Ulrich Pardatscher

T. Becze (Y. Pysarenko) – 06:38	1–0
	1–1	24:40 – R. Dutka (P. Dronia, T. Malasinski) (PP2)
	1–2	25:36 – S. Kowalowka (M. Bryk) (PP)
	1–3	29:25 – T. Malasinski (P. Dronia) (PP)
	1–4	46:29 – R. Galant (M. Strzyzowski, K. Dziubinski)
	1–5	48:49 – S. Kowalowka (K. Gorny, L. Laszkiewicz)
	1–6	54:59 – K. Dziubinski (M. Kotlorz, M. Strzyzowski)

16 min
Penalties
16 min
19
Shots
61

15 April 2013; 20:00	Estonia	1–8 (1–2, 0–2, 0–4)	Ukraine	Druzhba Palace of Sports, Donetsk; Attendance: 3,356

Game reference

Villem-Henrik Koitmaa
Goalies
Yevhen Napnenko
Referee:
(United Kingdom) Michael Hicks
Linesmen:
(Denmark) Rene Jensen
(Slovakia) Martin Korba

	0–1	03:19 – O. Tymchenko (V. Lyutkevych, O. Pobiedonostsev)
	0–2	07:46 – R. Blahyi (M. Kvitchenko, S. Varlamov)
A. Sibirtsev (A. Kuznetsov) (SH) – 13:23	1–2
	1–3	28:03 – R. Blahyi (S. Varlamov, M. Kvitchenko)
	1–4	35:18 – V. Polonytsky (V. Aleksyuk, S. Varlamov)
	1–5	42:41 – O. Toryanyk (V. Aleksyuk, A. Bondaryev)
	1–6	44:23 – O. Materukhin (O. Shafarenko, O. Tymchenko)
	1–7	53:14 – R. Blahyi (V. Polonytsky, M. Kvitchenko) (PP)
	1–8	53:43 – K. Ryabenko (O. Toryanyk, V. Aleksyuk)

14 min
Penalties
18 min
13
Shots
54

17 April 2013; 13:00	Estonia	3–6 (1–2, 2–2, 0–2)	Romania	Druzhba Palace of Sports, Donetsk; Attendance: 1,178

Game reference

Roman Sumikhin
Goalies
Adrian Catrinoi Cornea
Referee:
(Slovakia) Peter Lokšík
Linesmen:
(Ukraine) Anton Gladchenko
(Belgium) Frederic Monnaie

A. Sibirtsev (D. Suur, R. Rooba) (PP) – 07:00	1–0
	1–1	10:30 – T. Becze (Z. Antal)
	1–2	16:29 – C. Virág (I. Nagy, E. Mihály)
R. Rooba (D. Suur, I. Urushev) (PP) – 28:04	2–2
	2–3	30:20 – A. Góga (E. Moldován, S. Szocs) (SH)
A. Kuznetsov (J. Rajevski, V. Virjassov) – 35:56	3–3
	3–4	37:46 – C. Virág (I. Nagy, T. Becze) (PP)
	3–5	43:36 – Zsom. Molnár (T. Becze, S. Papp)
	3–6	56:31 – C. Virág (Zsol. Molnár, A. Góga) (SH)(ENG)

8 min
Penalties
14 min
21
Shots
34

17 April 2013; 16:30	Poland	3–1 (1–1, 1–0, 1–0)	Netherlands	Druzhba Palace of Sports, Donetsk; Attendance: 1,242

Game reference

Kamil Kosowski
Goalies
Martijn Oosterwijk
Referee:
(Ukraine) Maxim Urda
Linesmen:
(Denmark) Rene Jensen
(Ukraine) Artem Korepanov

T. Malasinski (K. Zapala, R. Dutka) – 02:49	1–0
	1–1	08:13 – R. Joly (I. van den Heuvel, M. Bruijsten) (PP)
R. Dutka (P. Dronia, K. Zapala) (PP) – 22:46	2–1
M. Kolusz (K. Zapala, P. Dronia) (PP) – 42:04	3–1

8 min
Penalties
8 min
32
Shots
18

17 April 2013; 20:00	Ukraine	7–0 (2–0, 2–0, 3–0)	Lithuania	Druzhba Palace of Sports, Donetsk; Attendance: 3,527

Game reference

Pavlo Yachnyk
Goalies
Nenjus Dauksevicius
Referee:
(Latvia) Andris Ansons
Linesmen:
(Slovakia) Martin Korba
(Slovenia) Damir Rakovič

O. Toryanyk (A. Mikhnov) – 08:46	1–0
A. Bondaryev (O. Toryanyk) – 11:32	2–0
V. Zakharov (V. Aleksyuk) (PP) – 21:49	3–0
Y. Petranhovskyi (D. Nimenko, O. Pobiedonostsev) – 27:42	4–0
O. Shafarenko (O. Materukhin, O. Tymchenko) – 45:10	5–0
V. Polonytsky (M. Kvitchenko) – 45:42	6–0
A. Mikhnov (SH, ENG) – 59:37	7–0

12 min
Penalties
10 min
50
Shots
12

18 April 2013; 13:00	Poland	5–3 (1–0, 2–2, 2–1)	Estonia	Druzhba Palace of Sports, Donetsk; Attendance: 1,320

Game reference

Przemysław Odrobny
Goalies
Villem-Henrik Koitmaa
Roman Sumikhin
Referee:
(Ukraine) Maxim Urda
Linesmen:
(Ukraine) Artem Korepanov
(Slovenia) Damir Rakovič

L. Laszkiewicz (S. Kowalowka, A. Baginski) (PP) – 18:46	1–0
	1–1	21:39 – A. Sibirtsev (V. Virjassov, A. Kuznetsov)
T. Malasinski (M. Kolusz) – 28:31	2–1
	2–2	32:18 – A. Sibirtsev (A. Kuznetsov, V. Virjassov) (PP)
M. Strzyzowski (K. Dziubinski, R. Galant) – 35:48	3–2
R. Dutka (K. Zapala, P. Dronia) (PP) – 40:38	4–2
	4–3	57:49 – A. Sibirtsev (A. Ossipov, F. Shvarogin) (PP)
K. Zapala (M. Kolusz, R. Dutka) (ENG) – 58:48	5–3

14 min
Penalties
10 min
43
Shots
35

18 April 2013; 16:30	Romania	2–1 (1–0, 0–1, 1–0)	Lithuania	Druzhba Palace of Sports, Donetsk; Attendance: 915

Game reference

Adrian Catrinoi Cornea
Goalies
Mantas Armalis
Referee:
(Latvia) Andris Ansons
Linesmen:
(Slovakia) Martin Korba
(Italy) Ulrich Pardatscher

A. Góga (C. Virág) – 07:49	1–0
	1–1	34:52 – D. Kulevičius (R. Aliukonis, T. Vyšniauskas) (PP2)
S. Papp (T. Becze) (PP) – 49:17	2–1

8 min
Penalties
6 min
25
Shots
33

18 April 2013; 20:00	Netherlands	2–3 OT (2–0, 0–2, 0–0) (OT 0–1)	Ukraine	Druzhba Palace of Sports, Donetsk; Attendance: 3,797

Game reference

Martijn Oosterwijk
Goalies
Yevhen Napnenko
Referee:
(United Kingdom) Michael Hicks
Linesmen:
(Denmark) Rene Jensen
(Belgium) Frederic Monnaie

M. Bruijsten (I. van den Heuvel, K. Bruijsten) (SH) – 06:54	1–0
S. Mason (R. Joly, N. de Jong) – 18:33	2–0
	2–1	21:29 – A. Mikhnov (A. Bondaryev, O. Toryanyk)
	2–2	29:44 – O. Tymchenko (O. Pobiedonostsev, O. Materukhin)
	2–3	62:14 – O. Tymchenko (O. Toryanyk)

10 min
Penalties
10 min
21
Shots
44

20 April 2013; 12:00	Netherlands	6–2 (3–0, 1–1, 2–0)	Romania	Druzhba Palace of Sports, Donetsk; Attendance: 1,014

Game reference

Martijn Oosterwijk
Goalies
Adrian Catrinoi Cornea
Gellert Ruczuj
Referee:
(United Kingdom) Michael Hicks
Linesmen:
(Ukraine) Anton Gladchenko
(Ukraine) Artem Korepanov

T. Demelinne (K. Bruijsten, M. Postma) – 11:10	1–0
R. Joly (M. Postma) – 13:10	2–0
L. van Sloun (R. Wurm) – 14:27	3–0
D. Hagemeijer (I. van den Heuvel) (PP) – 24:40	4–0
	4–1	34:55 – E. Moldován (A. Góga)
J-J. Natte (J. Smid) – 49:08	5–1
R. Wurm (D. van den Velden) – 57:10	6–1
	6–2	58:29 – Y. Pysarenko (C. Virág, Zsol. Molnár)

8 min
Penalties
16 min
26
Shots
28

20 April 2013; 15:30	Lithuania	12–3 (1–1, 3–2, 8–0)	Estonia	Druzhba Palace of Sports, Donetsk; Attendance: 1,087

Game reference

Nenjus Dauksevicius
Goalies
Roman Sumikhin
Villem-Henrik Koitmaa
Referee:
(Slovakia) Peter Lokšík
Linesmen:
(Italy) Ulrich Pardatscher
(Slovenia) Damir Rakovič

A. Visockas – 12:34	1–0
	1–1	19:57 – J. Rajevski (R. Rooba) (PP)
	1–2	30:33 – A. Sibirtsev (K. Kuusk, A. Kuznetsov)
A. Bendzius (A. Fiscevas, N. Ališauskas) (PP) – 32:07	2–2
	2–3	32:51 – A. Kuznetsov (K. Kuusk, F. Shvarogin)
A. Fiscevas (D. Bogdziul, A. Bendzius) – 34:01	3–3
A. Fiscevas (D. Bogdziul, N. Ališauskas) – 38:32	4–3
D. Bogdziul (A. Fiscevas, N. Ališauskas) – 45:16	5–3
A. Fiscevas (SH) – 48:44	6–3
A. Fiscevas (D. Bogdziul, A. Bendzius) – 50:28	7–3
A. Fiscevas (D. Bogdziul) – 52:20	8–3
D. Pliskauskas (P. Nauseda, A. Katulis) – 54:05	9–3
A. Fiscevas (A. Bendzius, D. Bogdziul) (PP) – 55:02	10–3
D. Pliskauskas (M. Slikas, A. Kaminskas) – 55:26	11–3
D. Kulevičius (S. Kuliešius) – 56:51	12–3

12 min
Penalties
18 min
52
Shots
29

20 April 2013; 19:00	Ukraine	4–3 (0–2, 3–0, 1–1)	Poland	Druzhba Palace of Sports, Donetsk; Attendance: 4,017

Game reference

Yevhen Napnenko
Goalies
Przemysław Odrobny
Referee:
(Latvia) Andris Ansons
Linesmen:
(Denmark) Rene Jensen
(Slovakia) Martin Korba

	0–1	00:13 – T. Malasiński (M. Kolusz)
	0–2	06:01 – T. Malasiński (R. Dutka, P. Dornia) (PP)
R. Blahyi (V. Polonytsky, S. Varlamov) – 27:42	1–2
O. Shafarenko (O. Tymchenko) – 28:02	2–2
O. Tymchenko (O. Shafarenko, O. Pobiedonostsev) – 36:47	3–2
O. Materukhin (O. Shafarenko, O. Tymchenko) – 40:36	4–2
	4–3	52:16 – J. Gabryś (L. Laszkiewicz)

16 min
Penalties
16 min
34
Shots
27

=== Statistics ===
==== Top 10 scorers ====
Pos	Player	Country	GP	G	A	Pts	PIM	+/−
1	Oleh Tymchenko	Ukraine	5	5	5	10	4	+6
2	Oleg Shafarenko	Ukraine	5	2	8	10	2	+6
3	Ivy van den Heuvel	Netherlands	5	2	7	9	6	+5
4	Daniel Bogdziul	Lithuania	5	1	8	9	0	-1
5	Aimas Fiscevas	Lithuania	5	6	2	8	0	+3
5	Aleksei Sibirtsev	Estonia	5	6	2	8	2	-7
7	Paweł Dronia	Poland	5	1	7	8	6	+6
7	Marcin Kolusz	Poland	5	1	7	8	2	+5
9	Oleksandr Toryanyk	Ukraine	5	3	4	7	4	+7
10	Roman Blahoi	Ukraine	5	6	0	6	2	+6

IIHF.com

==== Goaltending leaders ====
(minimum 40% team's total ice time)

Pos	Player	Country	TOI	GA	Sv%	GAA	SO
1	Kamil Kosowski	Poland	120:00	1	96.97	0.50	1
2	Martijn Oosterwijk	Netherlands	301:14	15	91.33	2.99	0
3	Mantas Armalis	Lithuania	178:54	11	90.98	3.69	0
4	Przemyslaw Odrobny	Poland	179:48	8	90.91	2.67	0
5	Yevhen Napneko	Ukraine	242.14	7	90.54	1.73	0

IIHF.com

=== Tournament awards ===
- Best players selected by the directorate:
  - Best Goalkeeper: (Netherlands) Martijn Oosterwijk
  - Best Defenseman: (Poland) Paweł Dronia
  - Best Forward: (Ukraine) Oleh Tymchenko

IIHF.com
