= Ice hockey at the 2014 Winter Olympics – Men's qualification =

Qualification for the men's tournament at the 2014 Winter Olympics was determined by the IIHF World Ranking following the 2012 Men's World Ice Hockey Championships. The top nine teams in the world ranking received automatic berths into the Olympics, while all other teams had an opportunity to qualify for the remaining three spots in the Olympics. As with Canada in 2010, the IIHF made no mention of direct qualification for the host.

== Qualified teams ==
Event	Date	Location	Vacancies	Qualified
2012 IIHF World Ranking	6 April 2009 – 20 May 2012	(Finland) Helsinki and (Sweden) Stockholm	9	Russia; Finland; Czech Republic; Sweden; Canada; Slovakia; United States; Norway; Switzerland
Final qualification tournament	7–10 February 2013	(Germany) Bietigheim-Bissingen	1	Austria
Final qualification tournament	7–10 February 2013	(Latvia) Riga	1	Latvia
Final qualification tournament	7–10 February 2013	(Denmark) Vojens	1	Slovenia
TOTAL			12	

Notes

1. ^{a} 2012 IIHF World Ranking were comprising the following events: 2009 World Championships, 2010 Winter Olympic Games, 2010 World Championships, 2011 World Championships and 2012 World Championships.
2. ^{b} Helsinki and Stockholm were sites for 2012 World Championship; at the conclusion of the tournament the ranking were finalized with regards to the qualification slots.

== Direct qualification ==
To qualify directly, a nation had to be ranked in the top nine following the 2012 Men's World Ice Hockey Championships. Using the IIHF World Ranking points system, the current year received full value, and each preceding year was worth 25% less. The following was a ranking based on points already accumulated toward Olympic qualification of all countries at the top level, or who are ranked amongst them. To qualify directly, a nation had to be ranked in the top nine following the 2012 Men's World Ice Hockey Championships. Using the IIHF World Ranking points system, the current year received full value, and each preceding year was worth 25% less. The following was a ranking based on points already accumulated toward Olympic qualification of all countries at the top level, or who are ranked amongst them.

Qualified directly to Olympic Tournament
Final qualification
Pre-qualification
Preliminary qualification

Rank	Team	WC 2012 (100%)	WC 2011 (75%)	WC 2010 (50%)	OLY 2010 (50%)	WC 2009 (25%)	Total
1	Russia	1200	1100	1160	1040	1200	3425
2	Finland	1100	1200	1040	1120	1060	3345
3	Czech Republic	1120	1120	1200	1020	1040	3330
4	Sweden	1040	1160	1120	1060	1120	3280
5	Canada	1060	1060	1020	1200	1160	3255
6	Slovakia	1160	940	900	1100	940	3100
7	United States	1020	1000	880	1160	1100	3065
8	Norway	1000	1040	960	940	920	2960
9	Switzerland	920	960	1060	1000	960	2910
10	Germany	900	1020	1100	920	840	2885
11	Latvia	940	880	920	900	1020	2765
12	Denmark	880	920	1000	840	880	2710
13	Belarus	860	860	940	960	1000	2705
14	France	960	900	860	740	900	2660
15	Austria	780	840	800	880	860	2465
16	Italy	840	780	840	800	780	2440
17	Kazakhstan	820	800	820	820	800	2440
18	Slovenia	800	820	780	760	760	2375
19	Hungary	760	760	740	720	820	2265
20	Ukraine	700	720	760	860	740	2235
21	Great Britain	720	740	680	640	700	2110
22	Japan	740	580	720	780	720	2105
23	Poland	660	680	700	660	680	2020
24	Netherlands	640	660	660	600	640	1925
25	Lithuania	600	640	620	700	660	1905
26	Estonia	560	600	560	680	520	1760
27	Romania	620	560	520	560	580	1725
28	South Korea	680	700	640		560	1665
29	Spain	540	620	540	540	480	1665
30	Croatia	520	520	580	620	620	1665
31	Serbia	480	480	600	580	540	1565
32	Australia	580	540	500		600	1385
33	Bulgaria	400	380	440	520	420	1270
34	Mexico	380	400	400	500	400	1230
35	Iceland	500	460	460		440	1185
36	Belgium	440	440	480		500	1135
37	New Zealand	460	500	420		320	1125
38	China	420	420	380		460	1040
39	Turkey	320	280	340	480	300	1015
40	Israel	360	320	360		380	875
41	South Africa	340	300	260		340	780
42	Ireland	260	340	320		240	735
43	Luxembourg	280	260	240		280	665
44	Greece	240	240	280		260	625
45	North Korea	300		300		360	540
46	Mongolia	220		200		220	375
47	United Arab Emirates			220			110

== Olympic preliminary qualification ==
One round robin was played on 17–19, September 2012 in Zagreb, Croatia. The winner of the group advanced to the prequalification tournaments.

=== Group K ===
Team	GP	W	OTW	OTL	L	GF	GA	DIF	PTS
Croatia	3	3	0	0	0	30	6	+24	9
Mexico	3	2	0	0	1	14	14	0	6
Serbia	3	1	0	0	2	12	12	0	3
Israel	3	0	0	0	3	5	29	−24	0

Team advanced to Olympic pre-qualification

All times are local (UTC+2).

17 September 2012; 16:30	Serbia	7–1 (2–0, 2–0, 3–1)	Israel	Dom Sportova; Attendance: 50

Game reference

Milan Luković
Petar Stepanović
Goalies
Avihu Sorotzky
Alex Aharonov
Referee:
(Poland) Przemysław Kepa
Linesmen:
(Russia) Roman Shikhanov
(Croatia) Marko Zibret

M. Kerezović (R. Sabadoš, N. Vučurević) – 08:13	1–0
A. Luković (M. Sretović) – 09:21	2–0
D. Filipović (A. Luković) – 24:19	3–0
N. Raković (M. Prokić, M. Sretović) – 32:49	4–0
N. Raković (A. Luković) (PP) – 40:45	5–0
	5–1	48:37 – A. Geller (D. Spivak)
A. Luković (M. Prokić, M. Sretović) – 51:21	6–1
M. Sretović (S. Ristić) – 58:03	7–1

8 min
Penalties
8 min
41
Shots
19

17 September 2012; 20:15	Mexico	2–9 (1–4, 0–1, 1–4)	Croatia	Dom Sportova; Attendance: 500

Game reference

Alfonso de Alba
Goalies
Mate Tomljenović
Referee:
(Hungary) Peter Gebei
Linesmen:
(Hungary) Marton Nemeth
(Finland) Hannu Sormunen

	0–1	07:58 – N. Senzel (M. Lovrenčić) (PP)
	0–2	11:13 – I. Brenčun (D. Kanaet)
	0–3	14:49 – M. Blagus (I. Lazić) (PP)
B. Arroyo (D. Romero) (PP) – 15:32	1–3
	1–4	16:37 – D. Kanaet (M. Blagus)
	1–5	28:39 – M. Blagus (M. Tadić, M. Lovrenčić)
	1–6	43:13 – T. Čunko
	1–7	49:48 – M. Tadić (D. Kanaet) (PP)
S. Ortega – 54:26	2–7
	2–8	56:22 – I. Šijan (M. Blagus)
	2–9	59:59 – J. Kučera (M. Blagus)

12 min
Penalties
6 min
32
Shots
51

18 September 2012; 16:30	Serbia	3–5 (1–1, 1–2, 1–2)	Mexico	Dom Sportova; Attendance: 50

Game reference

Milan Luković
Goalies
Andres de la Garma
Referee:
(Romania) Gergely Lehel
Linesmen:
(Croatia) Vanja Belić
(Croatia) Marko Zibret

	0–1	12:15 – D. Linares (S. Ortega, C. Kelo) (PP)
D. Filipović (R. Sabadoš) – 18:09	1–1
S. Ristić (M. Prokić) (PP) – 22:42	2–1
	2–2	26:43 – A.Gutierrez (B. Arroyo) (PP)
	2–3	33:26 – A. Gutierrez
	2–4	50:49 – B. Arroyo (A. Gutierrez, F. Ugarte) (PP2)
	2–5	52:57 – M. Colas
D. Filipović (R. Sabadoš) – 53:37	3–5

36 min
Penalties
4 min
33
Shots
35

18 September 2012; 20:15	Croatia	15–2 (5–0, 4–0, 6–2)	Israel	Dom Sportova; Attendance: 150

Game reference

Mate Tomljenović
Tihomir Filipeć
Goalies
Avihu Sorotzky
Alex Aharonov
Referee:
(Poland) Przemysław Kepa
Linesmen:
(Russia) Roman Shikhanov
(Finland) Hannu Sormunen

J. Hecimovic (I. Šijan) – 00:53	1–0
M. Blagus – 05:24	2–0
M. Lovrenčić (I. Lazić, M. Čunko) – 15:26	3–0
M. Tadić (M. Blagus, P. Trstenjak) – 16:01	4–0
M. Smerdelj (J. Kučera) – 17:41	5–0
M. Lovrenčić (J. Hecimovic) – 23:59	6–0
M. Lovrenčić (I. Lazić) (PP) – 29:46	7–0
D. Kanaet (M. Čunko) – 32:30	8–0
M. Lovrenčić (I. Lazić) – 33:55	9–0
I. Lazić (J. Hecimovic) – 40:14	10–0
	10–1	41:04 – A. Geller (V. Nosankov, D. Spivak)
J. Kučera (J. Hecimovic) (EA) – 44:32	11–1
	11–2	45:34 – D. Spivak (M. Lebedev, A. Geller)
D. Kanaet (T. Čunko, M. Čunko) – 47:57	12–2
I. Lazić – 49:59	13–2
M. Tadić – 51:22	14–2
D. Kanaet (M. Ljubić, N. Senzel) – 58:29	15–2

2 min
Penalties
18 min
70
Shots
18

19 September 2012; 16:30	Israel	2–7 (0–1, 0–5, 2–1)	Mexico	Dom Sportova; Attendance: 50

Game reference

Avihu Sorotzky
Goalies
Andres de la Garma
Alfonso de Alba
Referee:
(Romania) Gergely Lehel
Linesmen:
(Croatia) Vanja Belić
(Hungary) Marton Nemeth

	0–1	19:03 – B. Arroyo (C. Gomez)
	0–2	21:33 – A. Gutierrez (S. Ortega)
	0–3	27:44 – D. Romero (C. Kelo)
	0–4	28:45 – B. Arroyo (J. Ramirez)
	0–5	34:04 – B. Arroyo (A. Rosette, F. Ugarte)
	0–6	39:20 – H. Carrero (B. Arroyo, F. Ugarte)
D. Mazour (M. Lebedev) – 47:09	1–6
	1–7	49:55 – S. Ortega (M. Colas, D. Linares)
D. Mazour (M. Lebedev, A. Korotine) – 50:44	2–7

39 min
Penalties
14 min
24
Shots
38

19 September 2012; 20:15	Croatia	6–2 (3–0, 2–2, 1–0)	Serbia	Dom Sportova; Attendance: 1,500

Game reference

Mate Tomljenović
Goalies
Milan Luković
Referee:
(Hungary) Peter Gebei
Linesmen:
(Russia) Roman Shikhanov
(Finland) Hannu Sormunen

I. Lazić (M. Lovrenčić, J. Hecimovic) – 07:26	1–0
I. Šijan (M. Lovrenčić) – 13:55	2–0
P. Trstenjak (T. Čunko) – 18:22	3–0
	3–1	22:15 – N. Vučurević (A. Despotović)
J. Hecimovic (P. Trstenjak, T. Čunko) – 26:56	4–1
	4–2	37:24 – R. Sabadoš (N. Vučurević)
T. Čunko (P. Trstenjak) – 39:14	5–2
I. Brenčun (M. Smerdelj) – 47:52	6–2

4 min
Penalties
10 min
55
Shots
28

== Olympic pre-qualification ==
Three round robins were played from 8–11 November 2012. They were played in Budapest, Kyiv and Nikkō. 21st ranked Great Britain had the option to host group J, but passed on the right to the next highest-ranked nation. The winners of each group advanced to the final qualification tournaments.

=== Group G ===
Team	GP	W	OTW	OTL	L	GF	GA	DIF	PTS
Netherlands	3	2	1	0	0	24	10	+14	8
Hungary	3	2	0	1	0	25	9	+16	7
Lithuania	3	1	0	0	2	6	15	−9	3
Croatia	3	0	0	0	3	3	24	−21	0

All times are local (UTC+1).

9 November 2012; 15:30	Netherlands	8–2 (3–0, 3–0, 2–2)	Croatia	László Papp Budapest Sports Arena; Attendance: 460

Game reference

Ian Meierdres
Goalies
Mate Tomljenović
Referee:
(Germany) Florian Zehetleitner
Linesmen:
(Hungary) Peter Bédo
(Italy) Stefano Terragni

M. Kars (B. Willemse, M. Postma) – 10:32	1–0
K. Bruijsten (M. Bruijsten, D. Hagemeijer) (PP) – 11:37	2–0
M. Kars (N. de Jong, M. Postma) – 12:22	3–0
M. Kars (R. Joly, M. Postma (PP) – 25:26	4–0
D. Hagemeijer (I. van den Heuvel) – 27:56	5–0
M. Postma (M. Kars, R. Joly) – 37:39	6–0
R. van Hulten (M. Postma, D. van de Velden) – 47:56	7–0
M. Bruijsten (B. Willemse) – 55:21	8–0
	8–1	56:31 – M. Tadić (P. Trstenjak, B. Rendulić) (PP)
	8–2	57:25 – B. Rendulić

6 min
Penalties
23 min
44
Shots
19

9 November 2012; 19:00	Lithuania	1–5 (0–2, 1–3, 0–0)	Hungary	László Papp Budapest Sports Arena; Attendance: 4,350

Game reference

Mantas Armalis
Goalies
Bence Bálizs
Referee:
(Slovakia) Peter Jonák
Linesmen:
(Czech Republic) Jaromír Bláha
(United Kingdom) Andrew Dalton

	0–1	02:48 – A. Benk (D. Koger)
	0–2	14:10 – M. Vas (I. Sofron, B. Ladanyi) (PP)
	0–3	21:29 – J. Hari (V. Tokaji, L. Sikorcin (PP)
S. Kuliesius (A. Zidvokas) (PP) – 26:15	1–3
	1–4	31:06 – J. Hari (I. Bartalis, A. Mihaly) (PP)
	1–5	33:18 – M. Vas (B. Ladanyi, I. Sofron)

12 min
Penalties
14 min
21
Shots
43

10 November 2012; 14:00	Netherlands	9–2 (1–1, 6–1, 2–0)	Lithuania	László Papp Budapest Sports Arena; Attendance: 500

Game reference

Ian Meierdres
Martijn Oosterwijk
Goalies
Mantas Armalis
Arunas Aleinikovas
Referee:
(France) Damien Velay
Linesmen:
(Hungary) Peter Bédo
(Switzerland) Michael Tscherrig

	0–1	01:19 – D. Bogdziul (P. Verenis)
R. Joly (T. Demelinne) – 15:15	1–1
K. Bruijsten (B. Willemse, M. Bruijsten) (PP) – 20:22	2–1
K. Bruijsten (T. Demelinne) – 24:34	3–1
M. Kars (M. Postma, R. Joly) – 32:43	4–1
	4–2	35:09 – S. Kuliesius (R. Aliukonis, A. Zidkovas) (PP)
R. Joly (J. van Oorschot) – 35:36	5–2
T. Demelinne – 36:34	6–2
M. Bruijsten (K. Bruijsten, D. Hagemeijer) (PP) – 39:34	7–2
D. Hagemeijer – 50:30	8–2
M. Kars (R. Joly, M. Postma) – 57:38	9–2

14 min
Penalties
20 min
46
Shots
17

10 November 2012; 17:30	Hungary	13–0 (6–0, 3–0, 4–0)	Croatia	László Papp Budapest Sports Arena; Attendance: 6,215

Game reference

Bence Bálizs
Krisztián Budai
Goalies
Mate Tomljenović
Andrej Vasiljević
Referee:
(Germany) Florian Zehetleitner
Linesmen:
(Czech Republic) Jaromír Bláha
(Italy) Stefano Terragni

I. Bartalis (J. Hari, J. Vas) (PP) – 04:08	1–0
M. Vas (B. Ladanyi, A. Horváth) (PP) – 09:02	2–0
A. Mihaly (J. Hari, A. Hegyi) – 11:01	3–0
I. Sofron (B. Ladanyi, M. Vas) – 12:15	4–0
I. Sofron (PS) – 15:38	5–0
L. Sikorcin (C. Kovacs) – 16:23	6–0
C. Kovacs (I. Bartalis, M. Vas) – 31:13	7–0
B. Ladanyi (I. Sofron) – 35:04	8–0
L. Sikorcin (T. Pozsgai) – 39:58	9–0
B. Ladanyi (M. Vas, A. Horváth) – 47:38	10–0
J. Vas (V. Szelig) – 48:21	11–0
B. Magosi (A. Orbán) (PP) – 50:14	12–0
A. Mihaly (J. Hari) – 55:05	13–0

0 min
Penalties
10 min
68
Shots
10

11 November 2012; 14:00	Croatia	1–3 (1–2, 0–0, 0–1)	Lithuania	László Papp Budapest Sports Arena; Attendance: 560

Game reference

Mate Tomljenović
Goalies
Mantas Armalis
Referee:
(France) Damien Velay
Linesmen:
(Hungary) Peter Bédo
(Switzerland) Michael Tscherrig

I. Lazić – 02:58	1–0
	1–1	05:20 – P. Verenis (N. Alisauskas, D. Bogdziul) (PP)
	1–2	10:25 – D. Kazlauskas (R. Aliukonis, A. Visockas)
	1–3	59:46 – P. Verenis (N. Alisauskas) (ENG)

38 min
Penalties
8 min
27
Shots
52

11 November 2012; 17:30	Hungary	6–7 GWS (1–3, 3–1, 2–2) (OT: 0–0) (SO: 0–1)	Netherlands	László Papp Budapest Sports Arena; Attendance: 6,125

Game reference

Bence Bálizs
Goalies
Ian Meierdres
Referee:
(Slovakia) Peter Jonák
Linesmen:
(Czech Republic) Jaromír Bláha
(United Kingdom) Andrew Dalton

J. Hari (L. Sikorcin, V. Tokaji) (PP) – 08:17	1–0
	1–1	11:59 – M. Postma (R. Joly, M. Kars)
	1–2	15:38 – I. van den Heuvel (M. Bastings, J. van Oorschot)
	1–3	19:16 – K. Bruijsten (M. Bruijsten, T. Demelinne)
L. Sikorcin (J. Hari, V. Tokaji) (PP) – 21:19	2–3
	2–4	23:00 – R. Joly (M. Postma) (PP)
A. Mihaly (J. Vas, Á. Hegyi) – 31:03	3–4
M. Vas (B. Ladanyi, I. Sofron) – 36:28	4–4
	4–5	48:50 – N. de Jong (R. Joly)
J. Vas (J. Hari, D. Koger) – 54:44	5–5
B. Ladanyi (M. Vas) – 55:04	6–5
	6–6	58:30 – J. van Oorschot (T. Demelinne, B. Willemse)

J. Hari (miss)
C. Kovacs (miss)
Shootout
(miss) M. Postma
D. Hagemeijer
M. Kars
14 min
Penalties
12 min
35
Shots
30

=== Group H ===
Team	GP	W	OTW	OTL	L	GF	GA	DIF	PTS
Ukraine	3	3	0	0	0	22	1	+21	9
Poland	3	2	0	0	1	14	5	+9	6
Spain	3	1	0	0	2	5	16	−11	3
Estonia	3	0	0	0	3	4	23	−19	0

All times are local (UTC+2).

8 November 2012; 16:00	Poland	8–0 (1–0, 3–0, 4–0)	Estonia	Palace of Sports; Attendance: 1,011

Game reference

Przemyslaw Odrobny
Goalies
Villem-Henrik Koitmaa
Referee:
(Switzerland) Karol Popović
Linesmen:
(Austria) David Nothegger
(Ukraine) Oleksander Gorbatuk

M. Kolusz (K. Zapala) (SH) – 15:33	1–0
L. Laszkiewicz (K. Zapala, M. Lopuski) (PP) – 25:22	2–0
K. Dziubiński (T. Malasiński, M. Urbanowicz) – 27:33	3–0
M. Rompkowski (D. Gruszka) – 34:57	4–0
K. Dziubiński (M. Urbanowicz, A. Borzecki) – 52:09	5–0
M. Lopuski – 52:25	6–0
J. Gabrys (P. Dronia) (PP2) – 56:31	7–0
L. Laszkiewicz (SH) – 58:20	8–0

12 min
Penalties
14 min
63
Shots
9

8 November 2012; 20:00	Ukraine	7–0 (2–0, 5–0, 0–0)	Spain	Palace of Sports; Attendance: 5,217

Game reference

Igor Karpenko
Goalies
Ander Alcaine
Referee:
(Belarus) Maxim Sidorenko
Linesmen:
(Finland) Markku Buese
(Belarus) Alexander Matskevich

A. Mikhnov – 12:39	1–0
R. Fedotenko (S. Varlamov) – 16:46	2–0
A. Gnidenko(V. Donika, M. Ladygin) – 23:10	3–0
O. Ponikarovsky (R. Fedotenko, I. Kugut) – 27:35	4–0
A. Bondaryev (O. Materukhin, A. Mikhnov) – 34:12	5–0
O. Pobiedonostsev (S. Varlamov, V. Lyutkevych) – 35:41	6–0
S. Varlamov (O. Pobiedonostsev) – 39:59	7–0

2 min
Penalties
2 min
69
Shots
11

9 November 2012; 16:00	Poland	5–0 (1–0, 0–0, 4–0)	Spain	Palace of Sports; Attendance: 521

Game reference

Kamil Kosowski
Goalies
Ander Alcaine
Referee:
(Czech Republic) Robin Sir
Linesmen:
(Finland) Markku Buese
(Ukraine) Oleksander Gorbatuk

G. Pasiut (M. Lopuski) – 15:49	1–0
T. Malasiński (K. Dziubiński) – 43:44	2–0
G. Pasiut (L. Laszkiewicz) – 44:14	3–0
J. Witecki (M. Rompkowski) – 51:18	4–0
T. Malasiński (R. Dutka) – 57:01	5–0

10 min
Penalties
6 min
61
Shots
22

9 November 2012; 20:00	Estonia	0–10 (0–4, 0–4, 0–2)	Ukraine	Palace of Sports; Attendance: 5,521

Game reference

Anton Sizov
Villem-Henrik Koitmaa
Goalies
Yevgen Napnenko
Referee:
(Switzerland) Karol Popović
Linesmen:
(Austria) David Nothegger
(Slovakia) Tibor Rovensky

0–1	02:06 – A. Mikhnov (M. Ladygin
0–2	10:32 – R. Fedotenko (O. Ponikarovsky, O. Pobiedonostsev) (PP)
0–3	12:35 – R. Borysenko (S. Klymentyev) (PP)
0–4	16:34 – V. Donika (R. Blagy)
0–5	23:04 – S. Varlamov (O. Pobiedonostsev) (PP)
0–6	29:29 – O. Materukhin (R. Borysenko, A. Bondaryev) (PP)
0–7	38:40 – R. Borysenko (A. Bondaryev) (PP)
0–8	39:41 – Y. Navarenko (V. Polonytsky)
0–9	46:37 – O. Ponikarovsky (S. Varlamov, V. Lyutkevych)
0–10	49:29 – A. Bondaryev

24 min
Penalties
4 min
12
Shots
85

11 November 2012; 16:00	Spain	5–4 (2–0, 1–1, 2–3)	Estonia	Palace of Sports; Attendance: 658

Game reference

Ander Alcaine
Goalies
Villem-Henrik Koitmaa
Referee:
(Belarus) Maxim Sidorenko
Linesmen:
(Ukraine) Oleksander Gorbatuk
(Belarus) Alexander Matskevich

P. Muñoz (J. Brabo, G. Betran) (PP) – 09:24	1–0
O. Boronat (C. Quevedo, P. González) (PP) – 11:35	2–0
	2–1	24:25 – R. Embrich (U. Molder)
C. Quevedo (O. Boronat, G. Betran) (PP) – 38:05	3–1
A. Sosa (E. Paz, A. Vea) (PP) – 41:49	4–1
	4–2	45:21 – D. Suur (A. Jakovlev, V. Titarenko) (PP)
	4–3	49:49 – M. Semjonov (D. Suur, M. Ivanov)
	4–4	51:10 – M. Ivanov (D. Suur, A. Jakovlev)
O. Boronat (P. González) – 59:24	5–4

20 min
Penalties
14 min
37
Shots
35

11 November 2012; 20:00	Ukraine	5–1 (1–1, 2–0, 2–0)	Poland	Palace of Sports; Attendance: 6,026

Game reference

Yevgen Napnenko
Goalies
Przemyslaw Odrobny
Referee:
(Czech Republic) Robin Sir
Linesmen:
(Finland) Markku Buese
(Slovakia) Tibor Rovensky

	0–1	03:28 – D. Gruszka
V. Lyutkevych (O. Ponikarovsky, R. Fedotenko) (PP) – 18:53	1–1
O. Pobiedonostsev (V. Lyutkevych) (PP) – 20:39	2–1
M. Kvitchenko (K. Kasyanchuk) – 39:29	3–1
S. Varlamov (O. Ponikarovsky, O. Pobiedonostsev) (PP) – 42:59	4–1
K. Kasyanchuk (O. Shafarenko) (PP) – 56:06	5–1

33 min
Penalties
18 min
38
Shots
23

=== Group J ===
Team	GP	W	OTW	OTL	L	GF	GA	DIF	PTS
Great Britain	3	2	0	1	0	9	6	+3	7
South Korea	3	1	1	1	0	9	7	+2	6
Japan	3	1	1	0	1	6	4	+2	5
Romania	3	0	0	0	3	0	7	−7	0

All times are local (UTC+9).

9 November 2012; 14:00	Great Britain	4–5 GWS (3–1, 1–2, 0–1) (OT: 0–0) (SO: 0–1)	South Korea	Nikkō Kirifuri Ice Arena; Attendance: 592

Game reference

Stephen Murphy
Goalies
Park Sung-Je
Referee:
(Slovakia) Peter Loksik
Linesmen:
(Canada) Jordan Browne
(Japan) Kensuke Kanazawa

C. Peacock (C. Shields, B. O'Connor) – 03:34	1–0
D. Longstaff (PP) – 05:25	2–0
	2–1	05:25 – Kim W.J. (Kim K.S., Kim S.W.)
B. O'Connor – 17:28	3–1
	3–2	22:27 – Kim W.J. (Kim S.W., Kim K.)
C. Shields (C. Peacock, J. Weaver) – 30:09	4–2
	4–3	38:45 – Kim W.J. (Kim S.W., Kim K.)
	4–4	46:07 – Kim G. (Sin S.W.)

C. Shields (miss)
D. Longstaff (miss)
Shootout
Kim S.W.
Cho M.H.
4 min
Penalties
6 min
41
Shots
28

9 November 2012; 18:00	Japan	2–0 (1–0, 0–0, 1–0)	Romania	Nikkō Kirifuri Ice Arena; Attendance: 956

Game reference
Yutaka Fukufuji	Goalies	Adrian Catrinoi	Referee: (United States) Peter Feola; Linesmen: (United States) Paul Carnathan (Australia) Cory Ross
T. Saito (K. Mitamura, H. Terao) – 06:01 / 1–0; T. Yamashita – 47:54 / 2–0			Referee: (United States) Peter Feola; Linesmen: (United States) Paul Carnathan (Australia) Cory Ross
6 min	Penalties	6 min	Referee: (United States) Peter Feola; Linesmen: (United States) Paul Carnathan (Australia) Cory Ross
57	Shots	22	Referee: (United States) Peter Feola; Linesmen: (United States) Paul Carnathan (Australia) Cory Ross

10 November 2012; 14:00	Romania	0–3 (0–2, 0–0, 0–1)	Great Britain	Nikkō Kirifuri Ice Arena; Attendance: 1,143

Game reference

Gellert Ruczuj
Goalies
Stephen Murphy
Referee:
(Canada) Devin Klein
Linesmen:
(United States) Paul Carnathan
(Japan) Kensuke Kanazawa

0–1	03:17 – L. Jamieson (J. Weaver, D. Longstaff)
0–2	18:32 – B. O'Connor (L. Jamieson, D. Longstaff)
0–3	52:39 – R. Dowd (C. Shields, C. Peacock)

10 min
Penalties
10 min
17
Shots
47

10 November 2012; 18:00	Japan	3–2 OT (1–0, 1–1, 0–1) (OT: 1–0)	South Korea	Nikkō Kirifuri Ice Arena; Attendance: 1,762

Game reference

Yutaka Fukufuji
Goalies
Eum Hyun-Seung
Referee:
(Slovakia) Peter Loksik
Linesmen:
(Canada) Jordan Browne
(China) Liu Jia Qi

S. Kuji (G. Tanaka, J. Tonosaki) (PP) – 11:39	1–0
	1–1	28:51 – Sin S.W. (Kim G.H., Cho M.H.) (PP)
D. Obara (R. Hashimoto, H. Ueno) – 29:32	2–1
	2–2	59:49 – Sin S.W. (Yoon K.W., Sung W.J.) (EA)
S. Kuji (A. Keller) (PP) – 63:13	3–2

8 min
Penalties
10 min
32
Shots
20

11 November 2012; 14:00	South Korea	2–0 (1–0, 0–0, 1–0)	Romania	Nikkō Kirifuri Ice Arena; Attendance: 1,075

Game reference
Park Sung-Je	Goalies	Adrian Cornea	Referee: (United States) Peter Feola; Linesmen: (Canada) Jordan Browne (China) Liu Jia Qi
Kim H.O. (Kim S.W.) – 19:30 / 1–0; Kim K.S. (Kim Y.H., Kim S.W.) – 44:12 / 2–0			Referee: (United States) Peter Feola; Linesmen: (Canada) Jordan Browne (China) Liu Jia Qi
8 min	Penalties	4 min	Referee: (United States) Peter Feola; Linesmen: (Canada) Jordan Browne (China) Liu Jia Qi
32	Shots	34	Referee: (United States) Peter Feola; Linesmen: (Canada) Jordan Browne (China) Liu Jia Qi

11 November 2012; 18:00	Great Britain	2–1 (2–0, 0–0, 0–1)	Japan	Nikkō Kirifuri Ice Arena; Attendance: 1,738

Game reference

Stephen Murphy
Goalies
Yutaka Fukufuji
Referee:
(Canada) Devin Klein
Linesmen:
(United States) Paul Carnathan
(Japan) Kensuke Kanazawa

C. Peacock (R. Dowd, C. Shields) (PP) – 09:59	1–0
B. O'Connor (A. Tait) – 10:29	2–0
	2–1	44:01 – S. Kuji (D. Obara)

10 min
Penalties
12 min
35
Shots
22

== Final qualification tournaments ==
Three round robins were played from 7–10 February 2013. They were played in Bietigheim-Bissingen, Riga, and Vojens. The three group winners qualified for the Olympic tournament.

=== Group D ===
Team	GP	W	OTW	OTL	L	GF	GA	DIF	PTS
Austria	3	2	0	1	0	11	6	+5	7
Germany	3	1	1	1	0	9	5	+4	6
Italy	3	1	1	0	1	8	5	+3	5
Netherlands	3	0	0	0	3	3	15	−12	0

All times are local (UTC+1).

7 February 2013; 16:00	Austria	3–2 (2–0, 1–1, 0–1)	Italy	Eisarena Ellental; Attendance: 3,100

Game reference

Bernhard Starkbaum
Goalies
Daniel Bellissimo
Referees:
(Finland) Tom Laaksonen
(Latvia) Eduards Odins
Linesmen:
(Sweden) Andreas Malmqvist
(Germany) Nikolaj Ponomarjow

R. Rotter (M. Peintner, M. Altmann) (PP) – 06:01	1–0
G. Baumgartner (T. Koch, A. Lakos) – 17:10	2–0
	2–1	33:42 – A. Bernard (M. Insam, C. Borgatello) (PP)
D. Oberkofler (A. Lakos, M. Peintner) – 36:25	3–1
	3–2	50:07 – V. Rocco (E. Scelfo)

6 min
Penalties
6 min
22
Shots
38

7 February 2013; 19:30	Germany	5–1 (2–0, 1–1, 2–0)	Netherlands	Eisarena Ellental; Attendance: 3,780

Game reference

Rob Zepp
Goalies
Ian Meierdres
Referees:
(Russia) Alexei Ravodin
(Czech Republic) Vladimir Šindler
Linesmen:
(Slovenia) Matjaž Hribar
(Finland) Jari Korteniemi

A. Barta (J. Flaake, P. Gogulla) – 08:30	1–0
D. Wolf (A. Barta, J. Flaake) – 11:54	2–0
	2–1	29:01 – M. Kars (R. Joly) (PP)
A. Barta (Ma. Mueller, A. Rankel) – 38:48	3–1
M. Wolf (P. Gogulla, A. Barta) (PP) – 47:21	4–1
Mo. Muller (M. Wolf, A. Barta) (PP) – 58:57	5–1

8 min
Penalties
14 min
57
Shots
10

8 February 2013; 16:00	Austria	6–1 (5–0, 1–0, 0–1)	Netherlands	Eisarena Ellental; Attendance: 4,150

Game reference

Bernhard Starkbaum
Goalies
Ian Meierdres
Martijn Oosterwijk
Referees:
(Latvia) Eduards Odins
(Czech Republic) Vladimir Šindler
Linesmen:
(Switzerland) Andreas Kohler
(Germany) Nikolaj Ponomarjow

T. Koch (EA) – 05:39	1–0
G. Unterluggauer (T. Koch) (PP) – 08:15	2–0
T. Raffl (D. Schuller, T. Hundertpfund) – 08:50	3–0
D. Oberkofler (T. Raffl, A. Lakos) – 14:27	4–0
T. Koch (G. Baumgartner, M. Raffl) – 17:51	5–0
M. Trattnig (M. Peintner, M. Ulmer) – 32:41	6–0
	6–1	58:08 – M. Bruijsten (D. Hagemeijer, T. Demelinne) (PP)

6 min
Penalties
2 min
38
Shots
15

8 February 2013; 19:30	Italy	2–1 OT (1–1, 0–0, 0–0) (OT 1–0)	Germany	Eisarena Ellental; Attendance: 4,517

Game reference

Adam Dennis
Goalies
Dennis Endras
Referees:
(Finland) Tom Laaksonen
(Russia) Alexei Ravodin
Linesmen:
(Finland) Jari Korteniemi
(Sweden) Andreas Malmqvist

R. Sirianni (G. Scandella) (PP) – 10:15	1–0
	1–1	13:29 – J. Flaacke (G. Festerling)
N. di Casmirro (T. Johnson, R. Sirianni) (PP) – 62:19	2–1

2 min
Penalties
10 min
21
Shots
37

10 February 2013; 11:45	Netherlands	1–4 (0–1, 1–2, 0–1)	Italy	Eisarena Ellental; Attendance: 4,517

Game reference

Ian Meierdres
Goalies
Daniel Bellissimo
Referees:
(Latvia) Eduards Odins
(Russia) Alexei Ravodin
Linesmen:
(Slovenia) Matjaž Hribar
(Switzerland) Andreas Kohler

	0–1	05:16 – P. Iannone (D. Iori, A. Hofer)
	0–2	20:54 – V. Rocco (M. de Marchi, N. Plastino)
	0–3	21:07 – R. Sirianni (G. Scandella, C. Borgatello)
B. Willemse (T. Demelinne, J. Smid) – 35:07	1–3
	1–4	58:52 – V. Rocco (A. Hofer, M. Insam) (ENG)

4 min
Penalties
8 min
32
Shots
40

10 February 2013; 15:15	Germany	3–2 OT (1–0, 0–1, 1–1) (OT 1–0)	Austria	Eisarena Ellental; Attendance: 4,517

Game reference

Rob Zepp
Goalies
Bernhard Starkbaum
Referees:
(Finland) Tom Laaksonen
(Czech Republic) Vladimir Šindler
Linesmen:
(Finland) Jari Korteniemi
(Sweden) Andreas Malmqvist

B. Kohl (C. Braun, M. Mueller) (PP) – 18:41	1–0
	1–1	31:46 – A. Lakos (T. Raffl, D. Welser)
M. Wolf (A. Barta, P. Gogulla) (PP) – 46:54	2–1
	2–2	52:22 – M. Peintner (D. Oberkofler, M. Trattnig)
P. Reimer (C. Braun) (PP) – 62:34	3–2

4 min
Penalties
16 min
38
Shots
19

=== Group E ===
Team	GP	W	OTW	OTL	L	GF	GA	DIF	PTS
Latvia	3	2	0	1	0	11	7	+4	7
Kazakhstan	3	2	0	0	1	11	5	+6	6
France	3	1	1	0	1	9	7	+2	5
Great Britain	3	0	0	0	3	4	16	−12	0

All times are local (UTC+2).

7 February 2013; 15:30	France	2–3 (0–2, 1–1, 1–0)	Kazakhstan	Arena Riga; Attendance: 852

Game reference

Cristobal Huet
Goalies
Vitaly Kolesnik
Referees:
(Finland) Antti Boman
(Switzerland) Danny Kurmann
Linesmen:
(Latvia) Maksims Bogdanovs
(Switzerland) Nicolas Fluri

	0–1	07:00 – R. Starchenko (D. Upper)
	0–2	11:31 – K. Romanov (K. Dallman)
S. Treille (P-É. Bellemare) – 32:17	1–2
	1–3	34:40 – T. Zhailauov (F. Polishchuk) (PP)
B. Amar – 57:42	2–3

6 min
Penalties
6 min
38
Shots
19

7 February 2013; 19:30	Latvia	6–2 (2–1, 1–0, 3–1)	Great Britain	Arena Riga; Attendance: 5,058

Game reference

Edgars Masaļskis
Goalies
Stevie Lyle
Referees:
(Germany) Stephen Bauer
(Czech Republic) Ján Hribik
Linesmen:
(Czech Republic) Vit Lederer
(Russia) Alexander Sadovnikov

G. Meija (A. Ņiživijs) – 02:57	1–0
	1–1	03:58 – R. Dowd (C. Shields)
M. Indrašis (A. Ņiživijs, L. Dārziņš) (PP) – 14:43	2–1
O. Bārtulis (A. Ņiživijs) (PP) – 29:50	3–1
R. Ķēniņš (R. Jekimovs, M. Rēdlihs) – 43:24	4–1
G. Pujacs (G. Meija) – 53:07	5–1
	5–2	57:47 – C. Peacock (C. Shields, B. O'Connor) (PP2)
L. Dārziņš (M. Indrašis, A. Ņiživijs) (PP2) – 59:42	6–2

10 min
Penalties
28 min
39
Shots
15

8 February 2013; 15:30	France	4–2 (1–0, 2–0, 1–2)	Great Britain	Arena Riga; Attendance: 922

Game reference

Fabrice Lhenry
Goalies
Stevie Lyle
Referees:
(Germany) Stephan Bauer
(Finland) Antti Boman
Linesmen:
(Latvia) Maksims Bogdanovs
(Switzerland) Nicolas Fluri

L. Meunier (Y. Treille, J. Desrosiers) (PP) – 09:13	1–0
P-É. Bellemare (S. Treille, Y. Auvitu) – 27:19	2–0
D. Fleury (B. Amar) (PP) – 34:48	3–0
	3–1	43:54 – B. O'Connor (R. Dowd) (PP)
	3–2	51:36 – R. Lachowicz (M. Myers)
C. Bertrand (B. Henderson) – 53:46	4–2

22 min
Penalties
10 min
34
Shots
18

8 February 2013; 19:30	Kazakhstan	2–3 (1–2, 1–0, 0–1)	Latvia	Arena Riga; Attendance: 10,025

Game reference

Vitaly Kolesnik
Vitaliy Yeremeyev
Goalies
Māris Jučers
Referees:
(Czech Republic) Ján Hribik
(Switzerland) Danny Kurmann
Linesmen:
(Slovakia) Martin Hořínek
(Czech Republic) Vit Lederer

	0–1	01:58 – J. Štāls (G. Meija, A. Reķis)
	0–2	02:37 – M. Rēdlihs (R. Jekimovs)
D. Upper – 15:15	1–2
R. Starchenko (V. Alexandrov) (PP) – 33:00	2–2
	2–3	40:40 – L. Dārziņš (M. Karsums, J. Sprukts)

10 min
Penalties
4 min
23
Shots
34

10 February 2013; 13:00	Great Britain	0–6 (0–2, 0–4, 0–0)	Kazakhstan	Arena Riga; Attendance: 875

Game reference

Ben Bowns
Goalies
Vitaliy Yeremeyev
Referees:
(Finland) Antti Boman
(Czech Republic) Ján Hribik
Linesmen:
(Switzerland) Nicolas Fluri
(Slovakia) Martin Hořínek

0–1	00:30 – R. Starchenko (K. Dallman)
0–2	02:10 – K. Romanov (A. Troshinski)
0–3	25:58 – T. Zhailauov (V. Krasnoslobodtsev, K. Dallman) (PP2)
0–4	28:22 – A. Litvinenko (D. Upper, V. Alexandrov)
0–5	29:32 – I. Solarev (K. Romanov)
0–6	37:12 – V. Alexandrov (V. Novopashin) (SH)

16 min
Penalties
10 min
19
Shots
42

10 February 2013; 17:00	Latvia	2–3 OT (0–2, 1–0, 1–0) (OT 0–1)	France	Arena Riga; Attendance: 10,190

Game reference

Māris Jučers
Goalies
Cristobal Huet
Referees:
(Germany) Stephen Bauer
(Switzerland) Danny Kurmann
Linesmen:
(Czech Republic) Vit Lederer
(Russia) Alexander Sadovnikov

	0–1	02:50 – D. Fleury (Y. Auvitu) (PP)
	0–2	14:50 – L. Meunier (J. Desrosiers)
L. Dārziņš (R. Ķēniņš, M. Rēdlihs) (PP) – 34:59	1–2
M. Karsums (L. Dārziņš) – 40:12	2–2
	2–3	64:20 – P-É. Bellemare (B. Amar, L. Meunier)

10 min
Penalties
18 min
36
Shots
26

=== Group F ===
Team	GP	W	OTW	OTL	L	GF	GA	DIF	PTS
Slovenia	3	3	0	0	0	12	4	+8	9
Belarus	3	2	0	0	1	11	6	+5	6
Denmark	3	1	0	0	2	5	5	0	3
Ukraine	3	0	0	0	3	1	14	−13	0

All times are local (UTC+1).

7 February 2013; 16:00	Belarus	2–4 (0–1, 2–1, 0–2)	Slovenia	SE Arena; Attendance: 408

Game reference

Vitali Koval
Goalies
Robert Kristan
Referees:
(Norway) Owe Luthcke
(United States) Shane Warschaw
Linesmen:
(Norway) Remi Aasum
(Denmark) Jonas Reimer

	0–1	16:30 – J. Urbas (D. Rodman) (PP)
	0–2	21:40 – R. Sabolič (R. Tičar, Ž. Jeglič) (PP)
A. Kulakov (V. Denisov, A. Ugarov) (PP) – 28:45	1–2
A. Stepanov – 29:45	2–2
	2–3	42:06 – T. Razingar (PS)
	2–4	50:24 – D. Rodman (J. Urbas)

14 min
Penalties
8 min
19
Shots
20

7 February 2013; 20:00	Denmark	2–0 (1–0, 1–0, 0–0)	Ukraine	SE Arena; Attendance: 4,121

Game reference
Frederik Andersen	Goalies	Yevgen Napnenko	Referees: (Slovakia) Vladimír Baluška (Switzerland) Daniel Stricker; Linesmen: (Czech Republic) Tomáš Pešek (Sweden) Emil Yletyinen
F. Storm (M. Madsen, J. Jensen) – 15:15 / 1–0; M. Green (F. Storm, M. Madsen) – 25:00 / 2–0			Referees: (Slovakia) Vladimír Baluška (Switzerland) Daniel Stricker; Linesmen: (Czech Republic) Tomáš Pešek (Sweden) Emil Yletyinen
12 min	Penalties	31 min	Referees: (Slovakia) Vladimír Baluška (Switzerland) Daniel Stricker; Linesmen: (Czech Republic) Tomáš Pešek (Sweden) Emil Yletyinen
25	Shots	22	Referees: (Slovakia) Vladimír Baluška (Switzerland) Daniel Stricker; Linesmen: (Czech Republic) Tomáš Pešek (Sweden) Emil Yletyinen

8 February 2013; 17:00	Belarus	6–0 (1–0, 2–0, 3–0)	Ukraine	SE Arena; Attendance: 631

Game reference

Vitali Koval
Goalies
Yevgen Napnenko
Referees:
(Slovakia) Vladimír Baluška
(United States) Shane Warschaw
Linesmen:
(Finland) Likka Kiilunen
(Czech Republic) Tomáš Pešek

A. Filichkin (A. Ugarov, A. Kitarov) – 01:26	1–0
K. Koltsov (A. Stepanov, V. Denisov) – 29:59	2–0
A. Stepanov (V. Denisov, K. Koltsov) – 31:33	3–0
A. Kalyuzhny (A. Ugarov) – 54:06	4–0
A. Senkevich (A. Stepanov, A. Filichkin) – 54:40	5–0
D. Meleshko (A. Kulakov, A. Kitarov) (PP) – 56:08	6–0

6 min
Penalties
8 min
45
Shots
32

8 February 2013; 21:00	Slovenia	2–1 (0–0, 2–1, 0–0)	Denmark	SE Arena; Attendance: 5,000

Game reference

Robert Kristan
Goalies
Frederik Andersen
Referees:
(Norway) Owe Luthcke
(Switzerland) Daniel Stricker
Linesmen:
(Norway) Remi Aasum
(Sweden) Emil Yletyinen

D. Rodman (J. Urbas, A. Kranjc) – 23:33	1–0
	1–1	24:16 – N. Hardt (J. Jakobsen)
D. Rodman (A. Tavželj, M. Rodman) – 36:28	2–1

16 min
Penalties
0 min
28
Shots
38

10 February 2013; 14:00	Ukraine	1–6 (0–4, 0–1, 1–1)	Slovenia	SE Arena; Attendance: 545

Game reference

Vadym Seliverstov
Yevgen Napnenko
Goalies
Andrej Hočevar
Referees:
(Norway) Owe Luthcke
(Switzerland) Daniel Stricker
Linesmen:
(Denmark) Jonas Reimer
(Sweden) Emil Yletyinen

	0–1	03:47 – R. Sabolič (R. Tičar, B. Gregorc) (PP)
	0–2	04:29 – D. Rodman (PP2)
	0–3	04:49 – R. Sabolič (Z. Jeglič) (PP)
	0–4	09:14 – R. Tičar (Z. Jeglič)
	0–5	31:45 – J. Urbas (K. Pretnar, D. Rodamn)
A. Gnidenko (O. Toryanyk, O. Tymchenko) – 47:35	1–5
	1–6	58:22 – Z. Jeglič (R. Sabolič) (PP)

16 min
Penalties
20 min
31
Shots
27

10 February 2013; 18:00	Denmark	2–3 (0–0, 2–2, 0–1)	Belarus	SE Arena; Attendance: 3,988

Game reference

Patrick Galbraith
Goalies
Dmitri Milchakov
Referees:
(Slovakia) Vladimír Baluška
(United States) Shane Warschaw
Linesmen:
(Norway) Remi Aasum
(Finland) Likka Kiilunen

	0–1	25:12 – A. Kitarov (O. Goroshko)
M. Poulsen (K. Starkov) – 26:40	1–1
	1–2	28:10 – M. Stefanovich (A. Senekvich)
J. Jakobsen (M. Bødker, M. Christensen) – 38:21	2–2
	2–3	42:17 – A. Stepanov (P. Chernaok) (PP)

8 min
Penalties
4 min
25
Shots
31
