= David Borrelli =

David Borrelli may refer to:

- David Borrelli (ice hockey) (born 1981), Canadian-born Italian ice hockey player
- David Borrelli (politician) (born 1971), Italian politician
