= Trevor Johnson (ice hockey) =

Canadian-born Italian ice hockey player

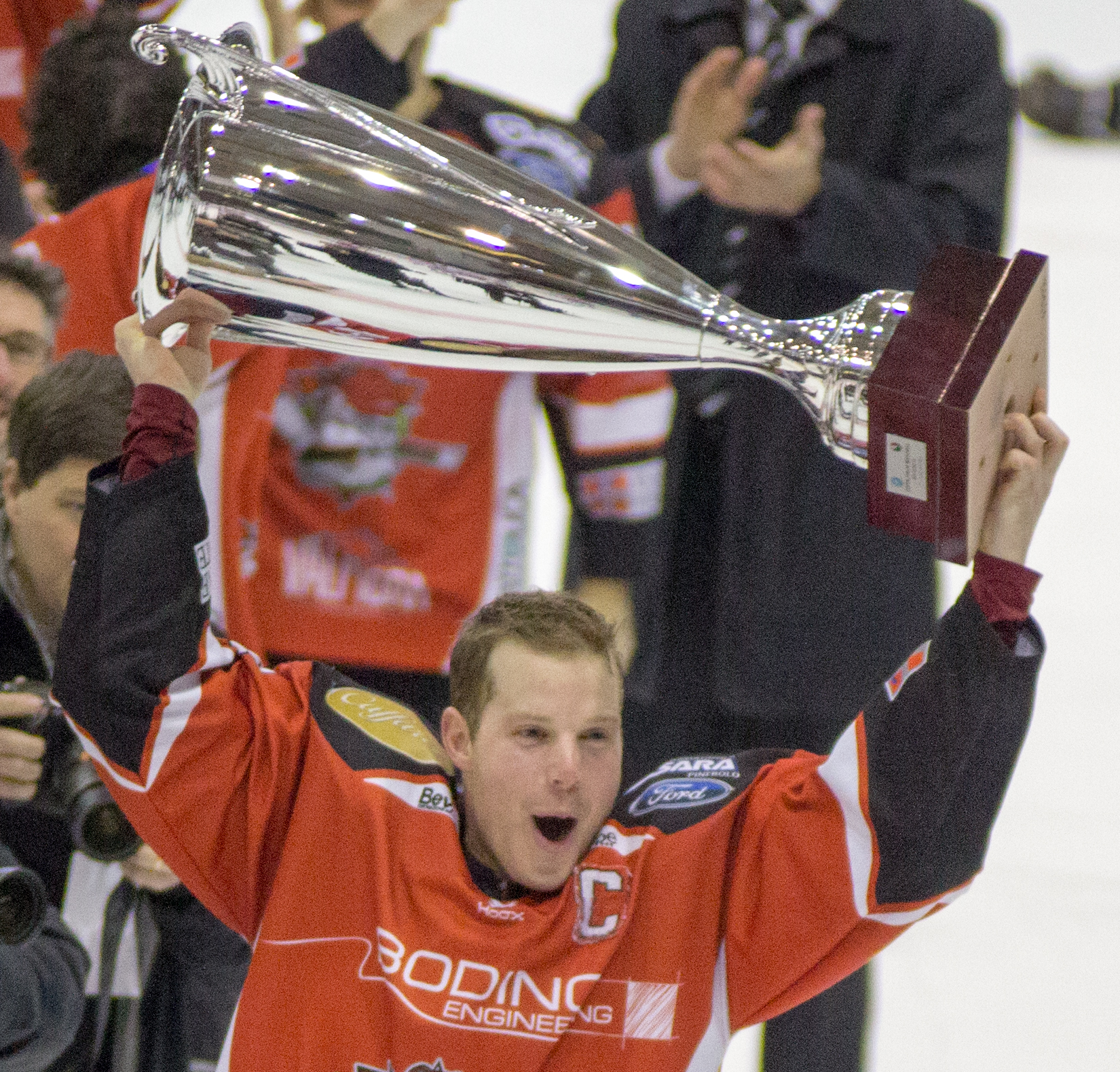
- Born: January 25, 1982 (age 44) Trail, British Columbia, Canada
- Height: 5 ft 10 in (178 cm)
- Weight: 176 lb (80 kg; 12 st 8 lb)
- Position: Defence
- Shot: Left
- Played for: AHL; Hershey Bears; Cleveland Barons; UHL; Muskegon Fury; ECHL; Peoria Rivermen; South Carolina Stingrays; Serie A SV Renon; AS Asiago; HC Bolzano; HC Valpellice; HC Pustertal Wölfe; DEL; Kassel Huskies; EIHL; Manchester Storm
- National team: Italy
- Playing career: 2003–2017

Trevor Johnson (born January 25, 1982, in Trail, British Columbia) is a retired Canadian-born Italian professional ice hockey player who last played for Manchester Storm of the Elite Ice Hockey League. He participated at the 2010 IIHF World Championship as a member of the Italian National men's ice hockey team.

== Career statistics ==
=== Regular season and playoffs ===
			Regular season					Playoffs
Season	Team	League	GP	G	A	Pts	PIM	GP	G	A	Pts	PIM
1998–99	Kootenay Ice	WHL	56	1	14	15	51	6	0	0	0	2
1999–2000	Kootenay Ice	WHL	65	5	26	31	100	21	2	7	9	35
2000–01	Kootenay Ice	WHL	68	11	42	53	98	10	1	4	5	12
2001–02	Kootenay Ice	WHL	43	10	23	33	64	—	—	—	—	—
2001–02	Seattle Thunderbirds	WHL	24	7	14	21	44	11	2	3	5	6
2002–03	Seattle Thunderbirds	WHL	10	2	4	6	29	—	—	—	—	—
2002–03	Tri-City Americans	WHL	56	15	25	40	123	—	—	—	—	—
2002–03	Muskegon Fury	UHL	7	0	6	6	2	9	4	6	10	10
2003–04	Muskegon Fury	UHL	74	3	23	26	86	2	1	1	2	2
2004–05	Hershey Bears	AHL	3	0	0	0	4	—	—	—	—	—
2004–05	Peoria Rivermen	ECHL	21	3	7	10	28	—	—	—	—	—
2004–05	South Carolina Stingrays	ECHL	38	5	19	24	37	3	0	1	1	2
2005–06	Muskegon Fury	UHL	66	10	44	54	104	12	1	3	4	46
2005–06	Cleveland Barons	AHL	3	0	0	0	5	—	—	—	—	—
2006–07	Sportverein Ritten-Renon	ITL	22	3	12	15	50	8	2	3	5	10
2007–08	HC Asiago	ITL	27	6	19	25	50	—	—	—	—	—
2008–09	HC Asiago	ITL	44	8	26	34	85	—	—	—	—	—
2009–10	Kassel Huskies	DEL	16	0	3	3	31	—	—	—	—	—
2009–10	HC Bolzano	ITL	14	2	8	10	14	11	3	3	6	12
2010–11	HC Valpellice	ITL	30	8	19	27	40	9	4	5	9	8
2011–12	HC Valpellice	ITL	45	7	25	32	46	4	1	2	3	8
2012–13	HC Valpellice	ITL	42	10	34	44	81	16	2	11	13	18
2013–14	HC Valpellice	ITL	41	2	43	45	56	4	1	5	6	4
2014–15	HC Valpellice	ITL	36	10	33	43	58	—	—	—	—	—
2015–16	HC Valpellice	ITL	36	4	23	27	48	—	—	—	—	—
2015–16	HC Pustertal Wölfe	ITL	6	1	2	3	22	15	1	6	7	20
2016–17	Manchester Storm	EIHL	52	7	28	35	53	—	—	—	—	—
ECHL totals			59	8	26	34	65	3	0	1	1	2

=== International ===
Year	Team	Comp	GP	G	A	Pts	PIM
2009	Italy	WC-D1	5	3	5	8	2
2010	Italy	WC	6	0	1	1	6
Senior int'l Totals			11	3	6	9	8
