= Patrick Iannone =

Canadian-born Italian ice hockey player

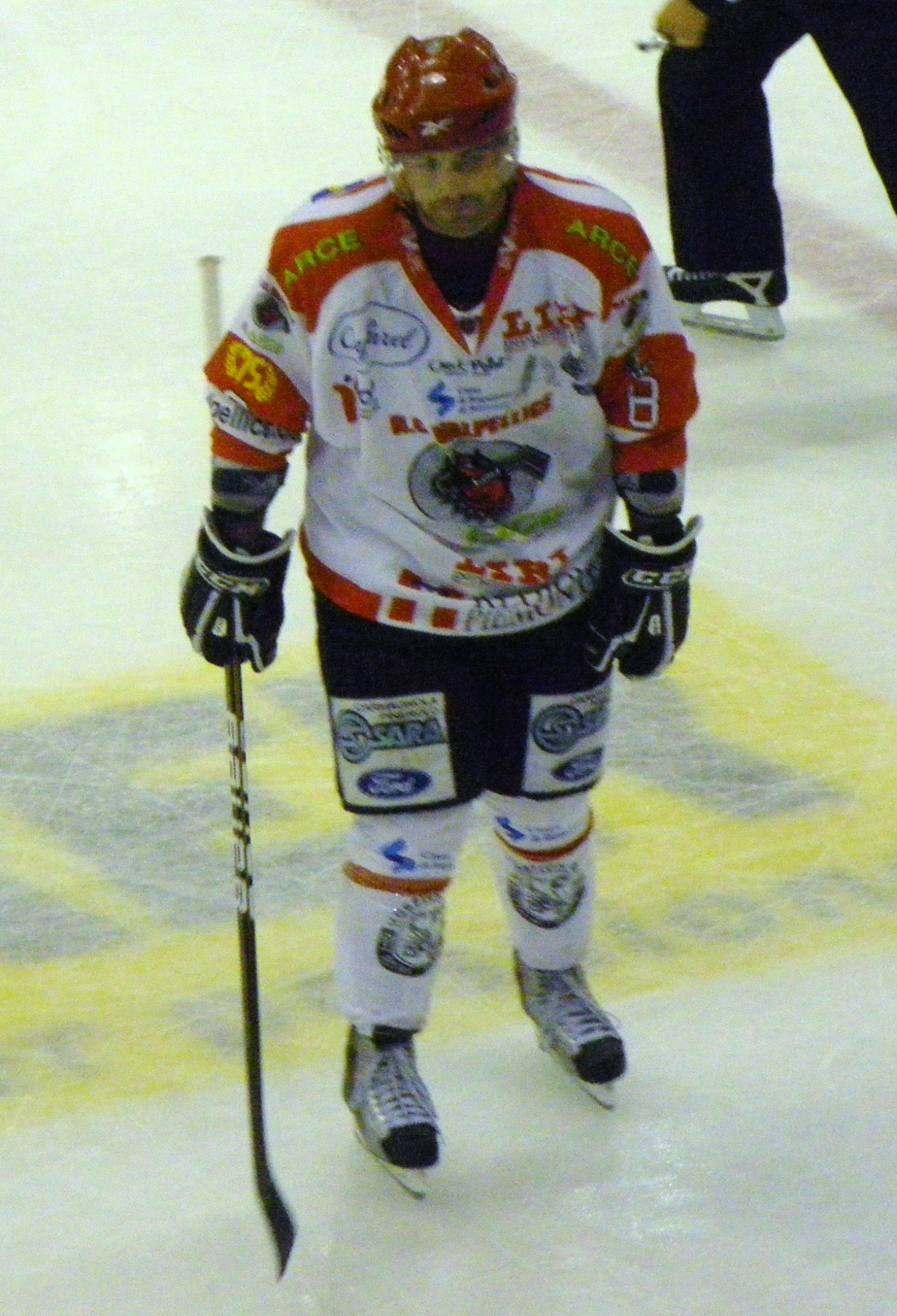
- Born: February 9, 1982 (age 43); Fruitvale, British Columbia, Canada
- Height: 5 ft 11 in (180 cm)
- Weight: 185 lb (84 kg; 13 st 3 lb)
- Position: Forward
- Shoots: Left
- National team: Italy

Patrick Iannone is a Canadian-born Italian former professional ice hockey player who participated at the 2010 IIHF World Championship as a member of the Italian National men's ice hockey team.

== Career statistics ==
			Regular season					Playoffs
Season	Team	League	GP	G	A	Pts	PIM	GP	G	A	Pts	PIM
1999–00	Kootenay Ice	WHL	58	1	5	6	65	13	0	0	0	2
2000–01	Kootenay Ice	WHL	68	8	4	12	139	11	1	1	2	2
2001–02	Tri-City Americans	WHL	71	18	13	31	129	5	1	3	4	8
2002–03	Tri-City Americans	WHL	5	1	0	1	12	—	—	—	—	—
2002–03	Medicine Hat Tigers	WHL	30	12	12	24	49	—	—	—	—	—
2002–03	Regina Pats	WHL	31	5	6	11	50	5	0	0	0	11
2003–04	HC Varese	Italy	39	25	23	48	70	5	6	5	11	18
2004–05	HC Varese	Italy	34	12	14	26	55	6	1	2	3	16
2005–06	HC Asiago	Italy	43	7	16	23	48	—	—	—	—	—
2006–07	HC Milano	Italy	31	5	6	11	50	5	0	0	0	11
2007–08	HC Milano	Italy	31	12	11	23	48	—	—	—	—	—
2008–09	HC Pustertal Wölfe	Italy	42	25	25	50	32	—	—	—	—	—
2009–10	HC Valpellice	Italy	40	28	27	55	56	5	4	2	6	12
2010–11	Valpellice	Italy	38	11	26	37	40	9	3	4	7	14
2011–12	Pontebba	Italy	32	21	17	38	36	6	4	7	11	18
2012–13	HC Pustertal Wölfe	Italy	44	19	24	43	66	10	4	3	7	0
Serie A totals			374	169	198	367	481	50	22	24	46	78
