= Druzhba Arena =

Indoor sports arena in Donetsk, Ukraine

Druzhba Palace of Sports
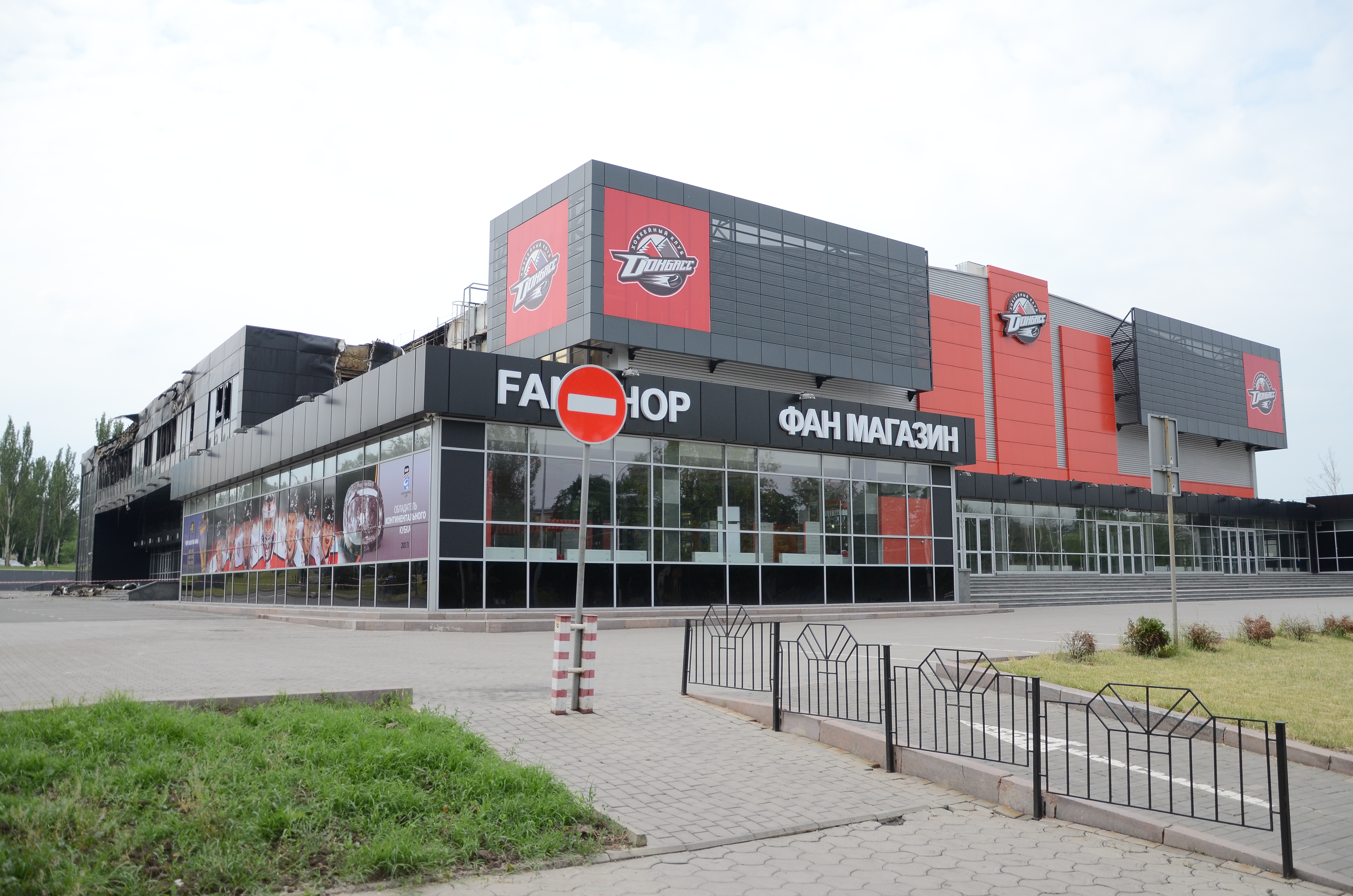
- Exterior with fire damage on the left side after the fire of 26 May 2014
- Interactive map of Druzhba Palace of Sports
- Location: Prospect Ilyicha 93 а 83003, Donetsk, Donetsk Oblast, Ukraine
- Coordinates: 48°0′4.36″N 37°50′41.03″E
- Capacity: 4,130 (ice hockey); 4,700 (sport events); 5,100 (concerts)
- Surface: 61x29 (ice hockey); 61x30 meters

Construction
- Built: 1975–1976
- Opened: 1976
- Renovated: 2010–2011, 2014
- Closed: 2014

Tenants
- MFC Shakhtar Donetsk (2001-2011); HC Donbass (2011–14); BC Donetsk (2006–14)

Website
- druzhba.dn.ua/en

Druzhba Arena (Ukrainian: Арена «Дружба», romanized: Arena «Druzhba») was an indoor arena in Donetsk, Ukraine. It was built to develop hockey in the region. It was destroyed in May 2014 during the War in Donbas.

== History ==
Druzhba was built in 1975 as Druzhba Palace of Sports (Ukrainian: Палац спорту «Дружба», romanized: Palats sportu «Druzhba»), by a standard design (dated 1956), with a seating capacity of 4,700 people for sporting events and 5,100 for concerts The Palace was open for visitors in 1976, and this event was the double surprise for fans, as the hockey match between Moscow hockey star teams was organized – Krylya Sovetov and Dynamo. The arena had a 60x30 rink for hockey.

Many memorable matches took place on the ice arena, for example, international youth tournament between teams from socialist countries (1976), international tournament for the prize of the newspaper Sovetsky Sport (1983) etc.

After the Palace of Sports was open, a hockey school for children was functioning on its base for 16 years. More than 500 children were taught in the school. Cooling units had worked without overhaul repair until the 1990s, and it became difficult to meet the requirements stipulated in the competitions conducted here and in 1992, the Palace was closed.

The Palace was reconstructed in 2010, during the renovation facade of the building was updated, the facility was equipped with modern freezing system, the stands capacity was increased to 4,000 spectators from 3,500. Donetsk obtained the right to host the 2011 IIHF World U18 Championship Division II. In 2013, it hosted the Final stage of the 2012–13 IIHF Continental Cup and the 2013 IIHF World Championship Division I.

It was the regular home venue of BC Donetsk (basketball team) and HC Donbass (ice hockey team). The arena hosted the annual Pole Vault Stars meeting, which was hosted by Sergey Bubka and have featured numerous world record performances.

=== 2014 fire ===
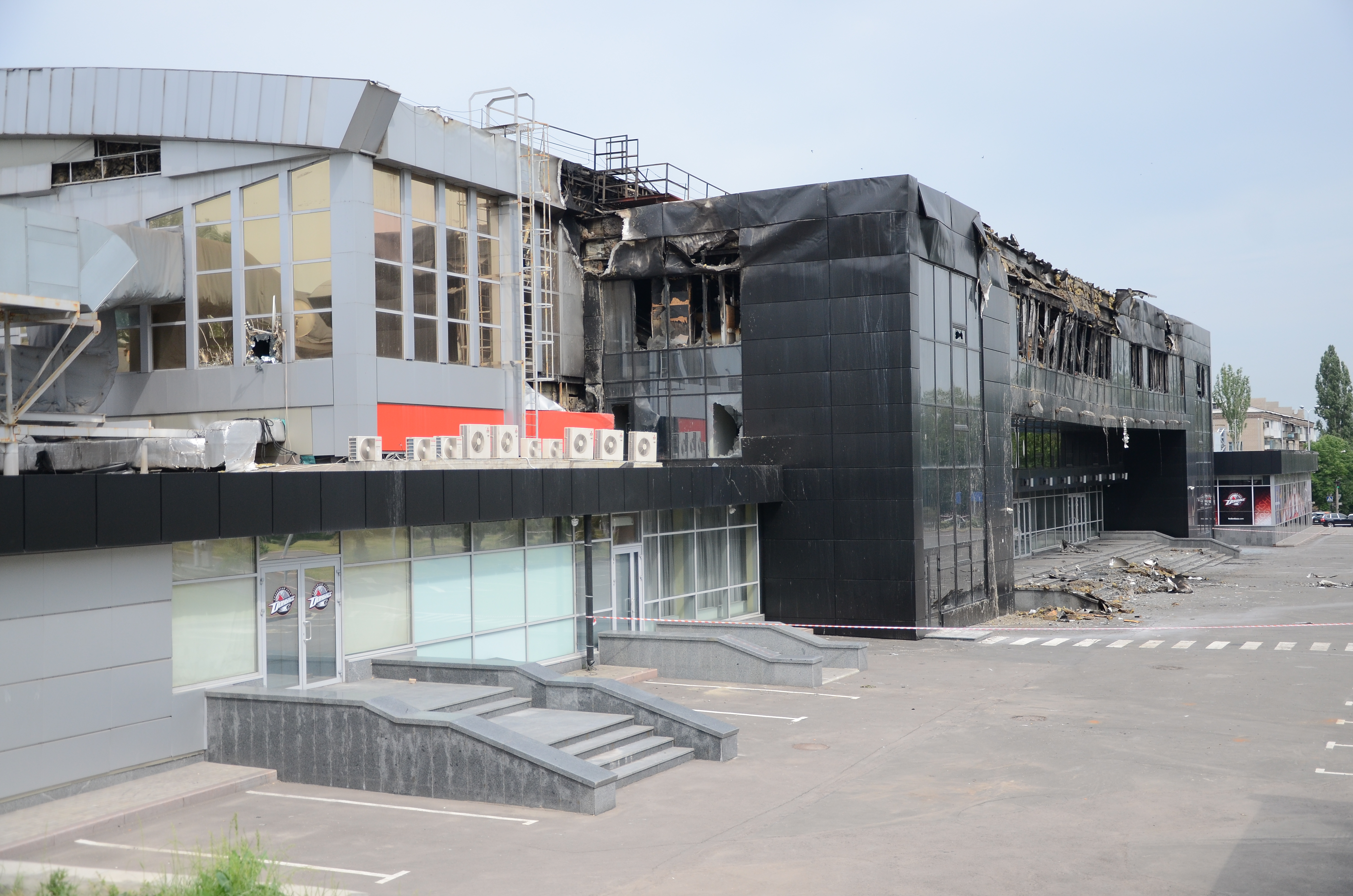
Damage to the ice rink after the fire

On the night of May 26, 2014, Druzhba Arena was ransacked by an armed group as part of the War in Donbas. The men tied up security, looted the arena, stole televisions, safety deposit boxes, equipment and a company car before destroying surveillance equipment – after which they set the arena on fire. President of the HC Donbas Borys Kolesnikov in an appeal of May 27, accused of what happened representatives of the so-called Donetsk People's Republic, saying “We call on those people who still sympathize with the rebels of the so-called Donetsk People’s Republic, terrorizing East Ukraine – think: Is this a “future” they want for themselves and their children?"

HC Donbas expected the arena to be operational within 90 days and fully restored by the start of the KHL season. This did not happen and the team provisionally withdrew from the KHL and HC Donbas currently play in Druzhkivka in the Ukrainian Hockey League.

Preceded by Krynica Ice Stadium; Krynica	IIHF World Championship Division I Venue; 2013	Succeeded by Siemens Arena; Vilnius
