= Dmitri Upper =

Kazakh-Russian ice hockey player

- Born: July 27, 1978 (age 48) Ust-Kamenogorsk, Kazakh SSR, Soviet Union
- Height: 6 ft 1 in (185 cm)
- Weight: 203 lb (92 kg; 14 st 7 lb)
- Position: Center
- Shot: Right
- Played for: Torpedo Ust-Kamenogorsk; Torpedo Nizhny Novgorod; Ak Bars Kazan; Spartak Moscow; CSKA Moscow; Atlant Moscow Oblast; Barys Astana
- National team: Kazakhstan
- NHL draft: 136th overall, 2000; New York Islanders
- Playing career: 1994–2016

Dmitri Sergeyevich Upper (OO-per; Russian: Дмитрий Сергеевич Уппер; born July 27, 1978) is a Kazakh former professional ice hockey center. He also holds Russian citizenship.

== Career ==
Upper was selected by the New York Islanders in the 5th round (136th overall) of the 2000 NHL entry draft, after scoring 20 points and 50 penalty minutes in his first season in the Russian Superleague with Torpedo Nizhny Novgorod. He was traded to Ak Bars Kazan midway through the 2000–01 season, and joined Spartak Moscow the following year. He had a career high 16 goals, as well as 76 penalty minutes in his first year with the club. He played four seasons with CSKA Moscow, scoring 27 points in 2005–06, before rejoining Spartak Moscow in 2007. He was named team captain in 2009, and had 30 points that season, but was traded to Atlant Moscow Oblast in the 2010 offseason. Injuries limited his productivity in his first season with the team. In 2012, he joined Kazakhstan team Barys Astana.

== International career ==
Upper has represented his native Kazakhstan in multiple tournaments, including the 1996 and 1997 IIHF World U20 Championship, the Ice Hockey World Championships in 2004, 2005 and 2011, and the 2006 Winter Olympics.

== Career statistics ==
=== Regular season and playoffs ===
			Regular season					Playoffs
Season	Team	League	GP	G	A	Pts	PIM	GP	G	A	Pts	PIM
1994–95	Dynamo–2 Moscow	RUS.2	1	0	0	0	0	—	—	—	—	—
1995–96	Torpedo–2 Ust–Kamenogorsk	RUS.2	36	9	9	18	36	—	—	—	—	—
1996–97	Torpedo Ust–Kamenogorsk	RUS.2	17	7	5	12	4	—	—	—	—	—
1996–97	Torpedo–2 Ust–Kamenogorsk	RUS.3	35	15	6	21	36	—	—	—	—	—
1997–98	Torpedo Ust–Kamenogorsk	RUS.2	27	10	6	16	26	—	—	—	—	—
1998–99	Torpedo Ust–Kamenogorsk	RUS.2	29	10	11	21	44	—	—	—	—	—
1998–99	Torpedo Nizhny Novgorod	RUS.2	11	4	10	14	16	—	—	—	—	—
1999–2000	Torpedo Nizhny Novgorod	RSL	36	14	5	19	48	5	1	1	2	4
2000–01	Torpedo Nizhny Novgorod	RSL	6	0	2	2	4	—	—	—	—	—
2000–01	Ak Bars Kazan	RSL	31	7	4	11	6	1	0	0	0	0
2001–02	Spartak Moscow	RSL	51	16	9	25	76	—	—	—	—	—
2002–03	Spartak Moscow	RSL	43	7	13	20	63	—	—	—	—	—
2003–04	CSKA Moscow	RSL	58	10	9	19	48	—	—	—	—	—
2004–05	CSKA Moscow	RSL	41	7	3	10	30	—	—	—	—	—
2005–06	CSKA Moscow	RSL	51	11	14	25	54	7	2	0	2	8
2006–07	CSKA Moscow	RSL	54	13	7	20	46	12	0	3	3	8
2007–08	Spartak Moscow	RSL	57	8	16	24	50	5	1	4	5	6
2008–09	Spartak Moscow	KHL	49	15	9	24	24	5	1	3	4	8
2009–10	Spartak Moscow	KHL	54	14	16	30	40	10	3	1	4	8
2010–11	Atlant Moscow Oblast	KHL	32	1	2	3	10	23	3	1	4	8
2011–12	Atlant Moscow Oblast	KHL	52	9	9	18	24	12	0	2	2	10
2012–13	Barys Astana	KHL	51	12	10	22	38	7	0	0	0	6
2013–14	Barys Astana	KHL	54	10	12	22	24	12	2	1	3	6
2014–15	Barys Astana	KHL	58	3	5	8	28	2	1	1	2	0
RSL totals			428	93	82	175	425	30	4	8	12	26
KHL totals			350	64	63	127	188	70	10	9	19	46

=== International ===
Dmitri Upper
Medal record

Men's ice hockey

Representing Kazakhstan

Asian Winter Games
Gold medal – first place	1999 Gangwon	Ice hockey
Gold medal – first place	2011 Astana-Almaty	Ice hockey

Year	Team	Event	GP	G	A	Pts	PIM
1996	Kazakhstan	WJC C	4	2	2	4	4
1997	Kazakhstan	WJC B	7	0	2	2	0
1997	Kazakhstan	WJC	7	1	0	1	2
1999	Kazakhstan	WC B	7	3	2	5	4
1999	Kazakhstan	WC Q	3	1	0	1	4
2000	Kazakhstan	WC B	7	6	4	10	16
2004	Kazakhstan	WC	6	3	1	4	16
2005	Kazakhstan	WC	6	1	1	2	8
2006	Kazakhstan	OG	5	0	1	1	8
2011	Kazakhstan	AWG	3	2	2	4	2
2011	Kazakhstan	WC D1	4	0	0	0	2
2012	Kazakhstan	WC	7	0	3	3	0
2014	Kazakhstan	OGQ	3	1	2	3	2
2013	Kazakhstan	WC D1A	5	0	6	6	4
2014	Kazakhstan	WC	7	0	1	1	6
Junior totals			18	3	4	7	6
Senior totals			63	17	23	40	72

Sporting positions
Preceded by Sergei Mozyakin	Atlant Moscow Oblast captain 2011–2012	Succeeded by Sandis Ozolins
Preceded by Kevin Dallman	Barys Astana captain 2012–2014	Succeeded by Brandon Bochenski
