= David Borrelli (ice hockey) =

Canadian-born Italian ice hockey player

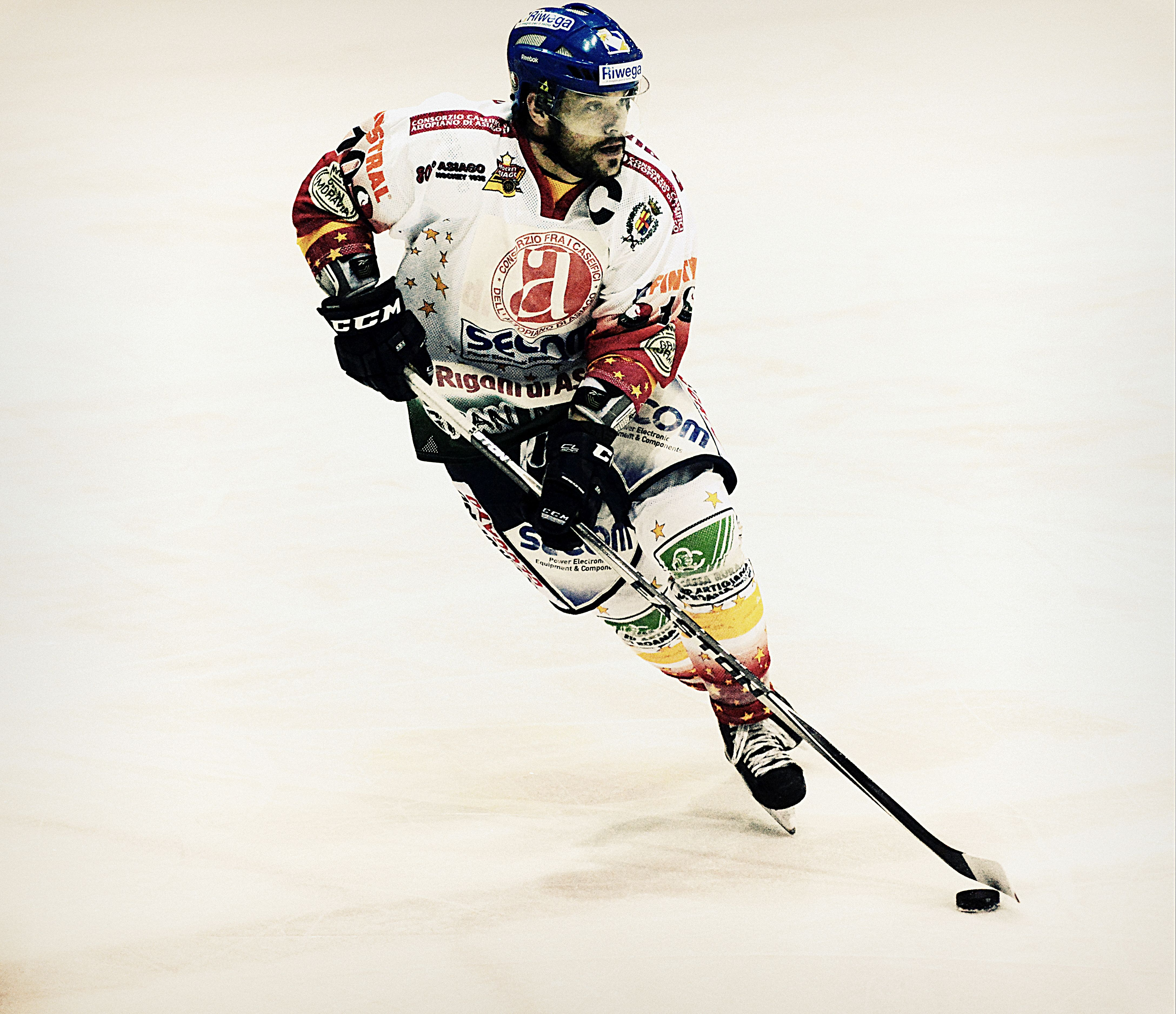
- Born: January 14, 1981 (age 44); Sault Ste. Marie, Ontario, Canada
- Height: 5 ft 9 in (175 cm)
- Weight: 179 lb (81 kg; 12 st 11 lb)
- Position: Left wing
- Shoots: Left
- Elite.A team Former teams: HC Asiago; ECHL; Reading Royals; Cincinnati Cyclones; Fresno Falcons
- National team: Italy
- NHL draft: Undrafted
- Playing career: 2006–present

David Borrelli (born January 14, 1981) is a Canadian-born Italian ice hockey player, now retired from pro hockey. He last played with the HC Asiago of the Italian Elite.A.

== International ==
Borrelli was named to the Italy national ice hockey team for competition at the 2014 IIHF World Championship.

== Career statistics ==
			Regular season					Playoffs
Season	Team	League	GP	G	A	Pts	PIM	GP	G	A	Pts	PIM
1998–99	Sault Ste. Marie North Stars	GNML	35	31	30	61	18	—	—	—	—	—
1999–00	Soo Thunderbirds	NOJHL	35	12	22	34	23	10	4	5	9	6
2000–01	Soo Thunderbirds	NOJHL	39	24	33	57	45	15	7	13	20	12
2001–02	Soo Thunderbirds	NOJHL	41	50	45	95	46	13	7	11	18	22
2002–03	Mercyhurst College	NCAA	33	9	10	19	36	—	—	—	—	—
2003–04	Mercyhurst College	NCAA	35	14	10	24	59	—	—	—	—	—
2004–05	Mercyhurst College	NCAA	36	17	18	35	66	—	—	—	—	—
2005–06	Mercyhurst College	NCAA	33	28	23	51	43	—	—	—	—	—
2006–07	Reading Royals	ECHL	5	0	1	1	4	—	—	—	—	—
2006–07	Cincinnati Cyclones	ECHL	7	1	0	1	4	—	—	—	—	—
2006–07	Fresno Falcons	ECHL	55	8	10	18	49	6	1	3	4	9
2007–08	HC Asiago	Italy	36	7	13	20	58	—	—	—	—	—
2008–09	HC Asiago	Italy	45	18	16	34	50	—	—	—	—	—
2009–10	HC Asiago	Italy	39	20	28	48	40	16	12	8	20	16
2010–11	HC Asiago	Italy	40	15	24	39	50	17	5	3	8	22
2011–12	HC Asiago	Italy	39	10	23	33	52	4	0	0	0	10
2012–13	HC Asiago	Italy	44	17	34	51	38	15	11	13	24	8
2013–14	HC Asiago	Italy	38	20	29	49	62	11	3	4	7	16
2014–15	HC Asiago	Italy	35	21	22	43	46	16	7	12	19	16
Italy totals			316	128	189	317	396	79	38	40	78	88
