= Daniel Sullivan (ice hockey, born 1987) =

Canadian-born Italian ice hockey player

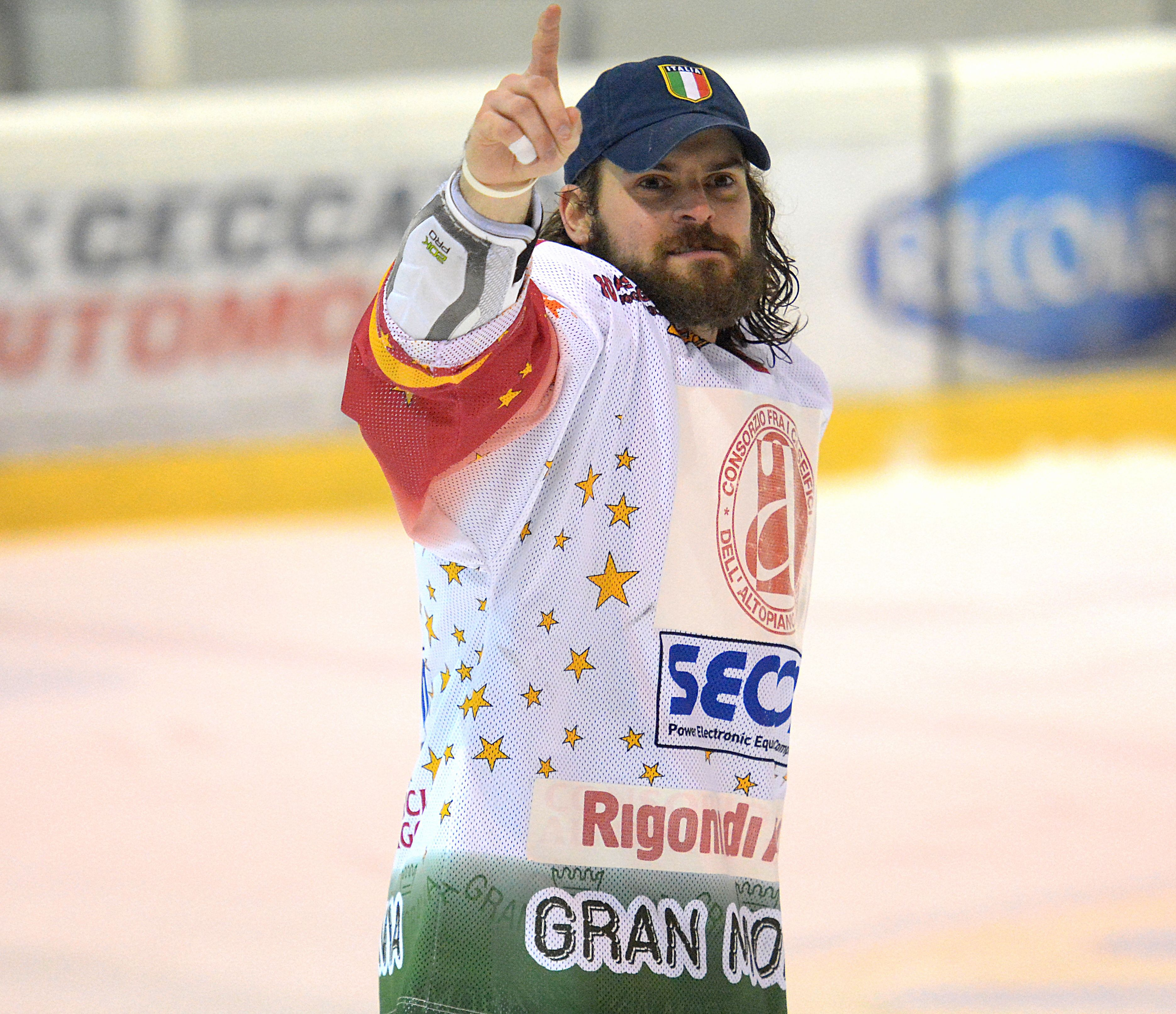
- Born: April 26, 1987 (age 38); Scarborough, Ontario, Canada
- Height: 5 ft 11 in (180 cm)
- Weight: 198 lb (90 kg; 14 st 2 lb)
- Position: Defence
- Shot: Left
- Played for: Reading Royals; HC Asiago
- National team: Italy
- NHL draft: Undrafted
- Playing career: 2009–2017

Daniel Sullivan (born April 26, 1987) is a Canadian-born Italian ice hockey defenceman. He is currently playing with the HC Asiago of the Italian Elite.A.

== International ==
Sullivan was named to the Italy national ice hockey team for competition at the 2014 IIHF World Championship.
