= Markus Peintner =

Austrian ice hockey player

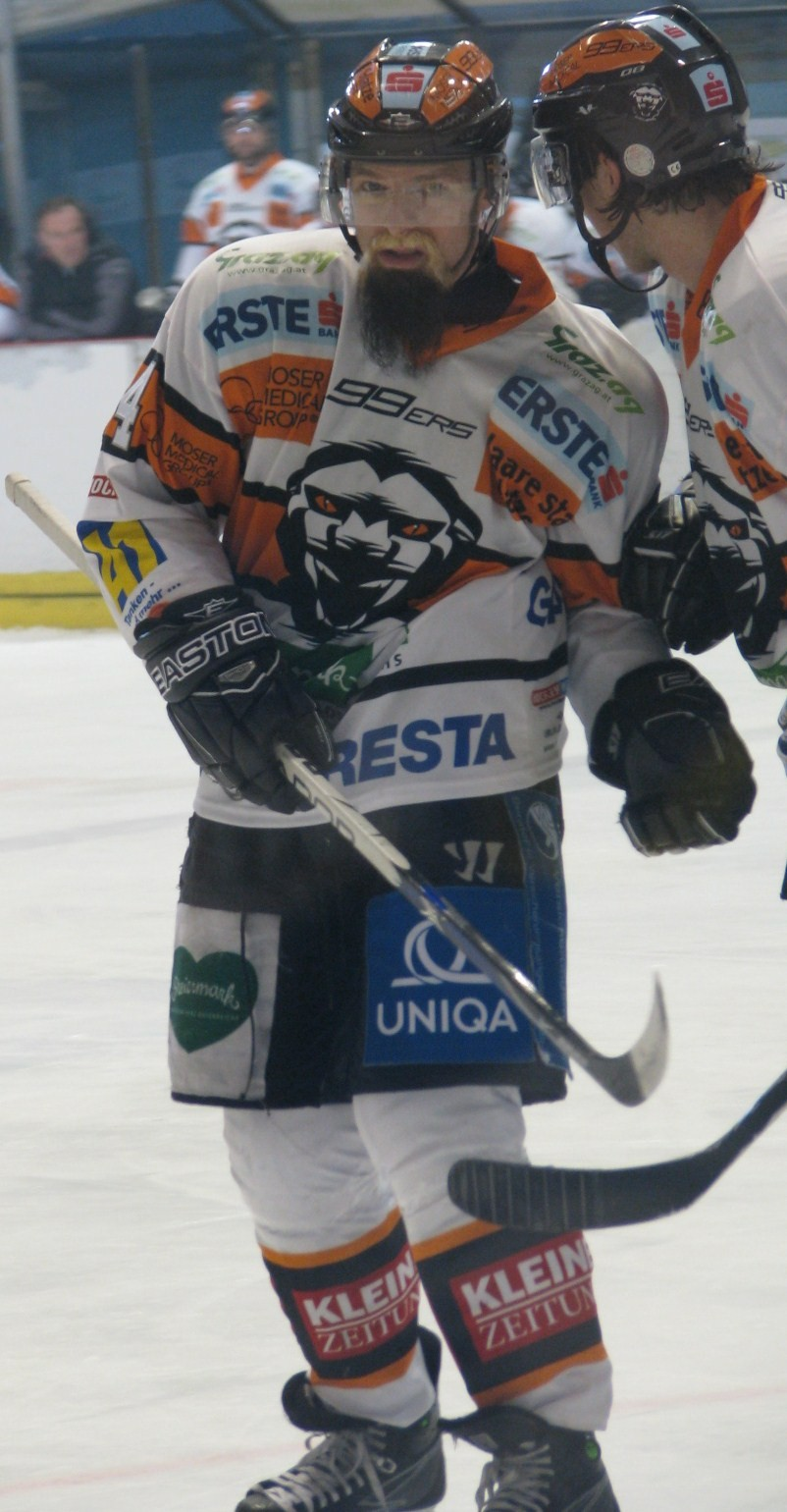
- Born: 17 December 1980 (age 44); Lustenau, Austria
- Height: 5 ft 11 in (180 cm)
- Weight: 182 lb (83 kg; 13 st 0 lb)
- Position: Forward
- Shoots: Left
- Austria team Former teams: EC VSV; EHC Lustenau; VEU Feldkirch; EHC Black Wings Linz; Vienna Capitals; Graz 99ers
- National team: Austria
- NHL draft: Undrafted
- Playing career: 1999–present

Markus Peintner (born 17 December 1980) is an Austrian ice hockey player who participated at the 2011 IIHF World Championship as a member of the Austria men's national ice hockey team.
