= Nicola Fontanive =

Italian professional ice hockey player

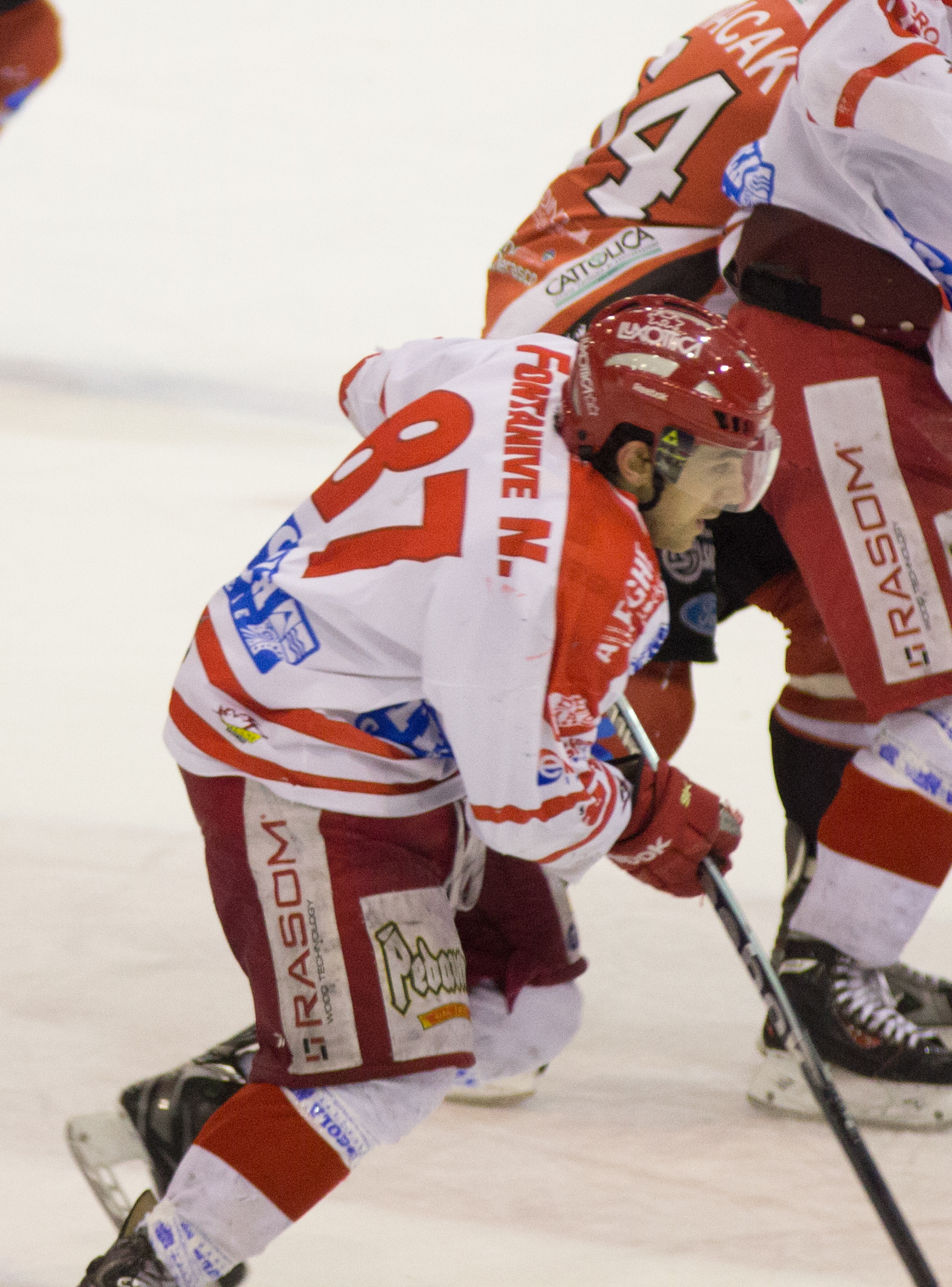
- Born: 25 October 1985 (age 40) Belluno, Italy
- Height: 5 ft 6 in (168 cm)
- Weight: 163 lb (74 kg; 11 st 9 lb)
- Position: Centre
- Shoots: Right
- Elite.A team: Hockey Milano Rossoblu
- National team: Italy
- NHL draft: Undrafted
- Playing career: 2002–present

Nicola Fontanive (born 25 October 1985) was an Italian professional ice hockey player. He retired in 2017, playing his last season with Sportivi Ghiaccio Cortina in the Alps Hockey League. He is now a personal trainer.

He was named to the Italy national ice hockey team for competition at the 2014 IIHF World Championship.
