= Andrej Vasiljević =

Croatian ice hockey player

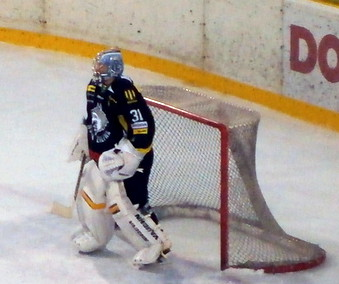
- Andrej Vasiljević
- Born: September 23, 1993 (age 31); Zagreb, Croatia
- Height: 6 ft 0 in (183 cm)
- Weight: 181 lb (82 kg; 12 st 13 lb)
- Position: Goaltender
- Shoots: Left
- KHL team: KHL Medveščak Zagreb
- National team: Croatia
- NHL draft: Undrafted
- Playing career: 2011–present

Andrej Vasiljević (born September 23, 1993) is a Croatian ice hockey goaltender. He is currently playing with KHL Medveščak Zagreb of the Kontinental Hockey League (KHL).

Vasiljević made his debut with KHL Medveščak Zagreb during the 2010–11 season.
