= Alexander Kuznetsov (ice hockey) =

Russian ice hockey player

- Born: March 11, 1992 (age 33); Moscow, Russia
- Height: 6 ft 0 in (183 cm)
- Weight: 183 lb (83 kg; 13 st 1 lb)
- Position: Forward
- Shoots: Left
- KHL team Former teams: Free agent Admiral Vladivostok; Dynamo Moscow; Spartak Moscow; Amur Khabarovsk
- Playing career: 2013–present

Medal record

Ice hockey

Representing Russia

World Junior A Challenge
Bronze medal – third place	2009 Summerside	

Alexander Kuznetsov (Russian: Александр Кузнецов; born March 11, 1992) is a Russian professional ice hockey player. He is currently an unrestricted free agent, who most recently played with Amur Khabarovsk of the Kontinental Hockey League (KHL).

Kuznetsov made his Kontinental Hockey League debut playing with Admiral Vladivostok during the 2013–14 season.
