= Vincent Rocco =

American singer

- Born: March 10, 1967 (age 58); Baltimore, Maryland, United States
- Genres: Rock, Alternative Rock, Pop
- Occupations: Recording artist, singer, songwriter, musician
- Website: web.archive.org/web/20120413221406/http://www.vincentrocco.com/

Vincent Rocco (born March 10, 1967) is an American musician, recording artist, singer, and songwriter.

Rocco was born in Baltimore, Maryland. He grew up in Scotland and South Africa.

Rocco's first album, Hell or Highwater, was released in 1992 by Elektra Records. The album was called a "tasteful blend of soul and blues." Hell or Highwater featured collaborations with John Shanks (Melissa Etheridge band) and Scott F. Crago (The Eagles) and was produced by Mark McKenna.

In 1999, Rocco formed the band Multiplug and recorded the album Oswald Road, which was released in 2000 by Interscope Records. The album has been called "more like a solo project for lead singer and songwriter Vincent Rocco" by numerous outlets and included a "promising collection of ten modern rock anthems." Steve Huey of All Music Guide wrote that Multiplug's Oswald Road "blends smart songwriting with melodic guitar rock." Oswald Road was produced by Marc Waterman, well known for his work with popular British bands such as Ash and Elastica. The album was mixed by Tim Palmer who has worked with Pearl Jam, David Bowie, Ozzy Osbourne and Tears for Fears.

Throughout his career, Rocco has worked on various projects with high profile names such as Steve Stevens (Billy Idol), Andy Summers (The Police), Charlie Sexton, Little Steven (Bruce Springsteen), Terri Nunn (Berlin), Danny Kortchmar (Don Henley), Greg Bissonette (David Lee Roth), Stan Lynch (Tom Petty & the Heartbreakers), Billy Duffy (The Cult), Steve Jones (Sex Pistols), Mark Brzezicki (Big Country), Craig Adams (The Mission), and Kevin Haskins (Bauhaus).

Rocco is currently published by Universal Music.
