= 2010–11 Serie A (ice hockey) season =

Italian professional ice hockey season

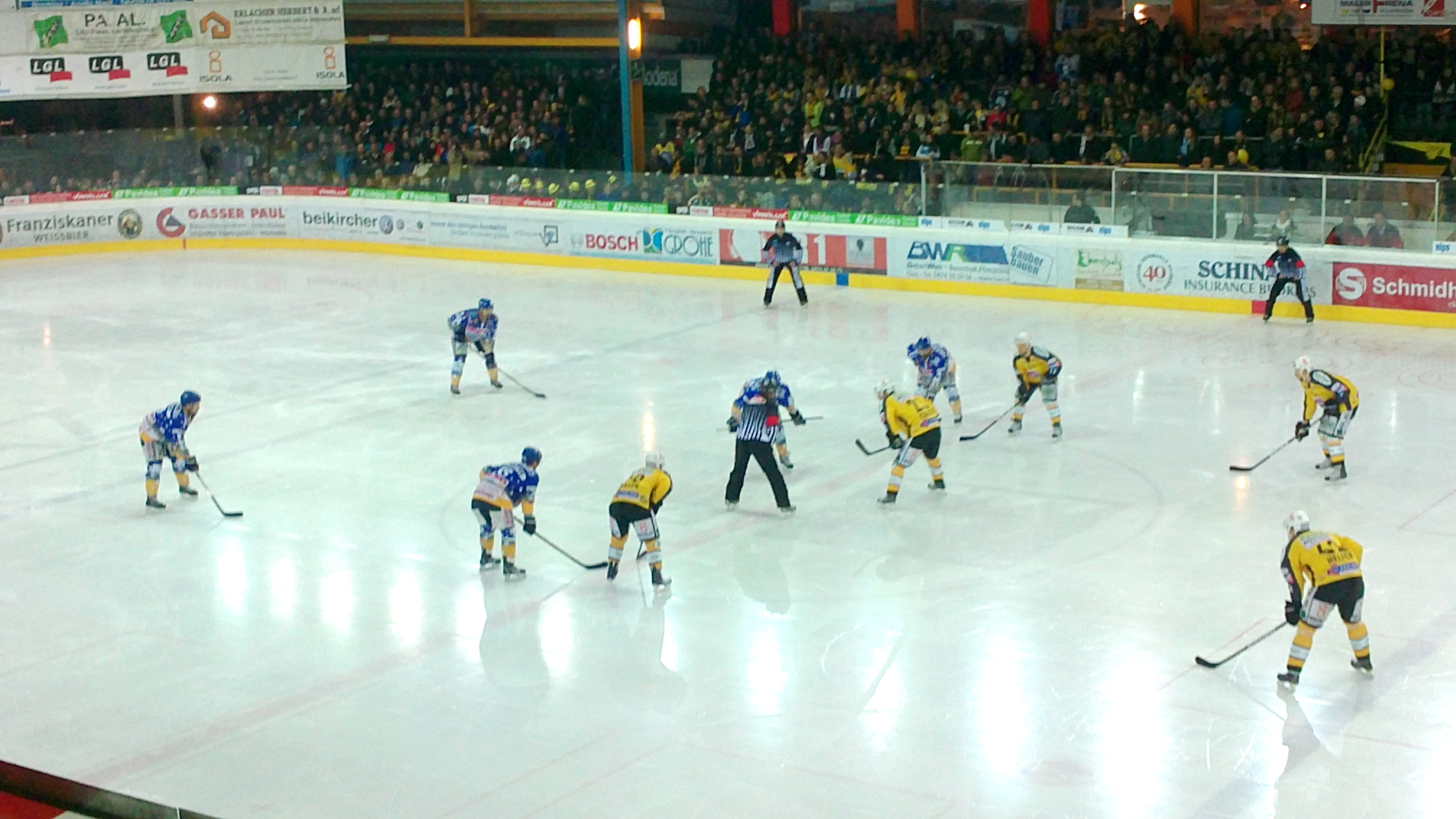
The first puck thrown-in at the final game of the 2010/11 season between Pustertal and Asiago.

The 2010–11 Serie A season was the 77th season of the Serie A, the top level of ice hockey in Italy. Nine teams participated in the league, and Asiago Hockey won the championship by defeating HC Pustertal in the final.

== Regular season ==
Place	Team	Pts	GP	W	OTW/SOW	L	OTL/SOL	GF–GA	+/-
1	HC Pustertal	84	40	26	2	10	2	158:126	+32
2	Asiago Hockey	77	40	23	4	13	0	143:116	+27
3	HC Bolzano	76	40	22	3	11	4	139:94	+45
4	Ritten Sport	74	40	19	7	11	3	130:111	+19
5	HC Valpellice	59	40	18	0	17	5	140:138	+2
6	SG Pontebba	49	40	13	2	19	6	118:142	-24
7	SHC Fassa	42	40	6	11	21	2	106:136	-30
8	HC Alleghe	42	40	12	0	22	6	109:143	-34
9	SG Cortina	37	40	10	2	25	3	100:137	-37

== Playoffs ==
Quarterfinals
1	HC Pustertal	4
8	HC Alleghe	1
4	Ritten Sport	1
5	HC Valpellice	4
2	Asiago Hockey	4
7	SHC Fassa	1
3	HC Bolzano	4
6	SG Pontebba	0

Semifinals
1	HC Pustertal	4
5	HC Valpellice	0
2	Asiago Hockey	4
3	HC Bolzano	3

Final
1	HC Pustertal	2
2	Asiago Hockey	4
