= 2008–09 Serie A (ice hockey) season =

Italian professional ice hockey season

The 2008–09 Serie A season was the 75th season of the Serie A, the top level of ice hockey in Italy. Eight teams participated in the league, and HC Bolzano won the championship by defeating Ritten Sport in the final.

== Regular season ==
Place	Team	Pts	GP	W	OTW	L	OTL	GF–GA	Diff
1	Ritten Sport	48	42	24	2	7	9	166:119	+47
2	HC Bolzano	46	42	23	6	8	5	170:118	+52
3	SG Cortina	44	42	24	7	7	4	162:114	+48
4	HC Pustertal	39	42	18	2	16	6	151:138	+13
5	AS Asiago Hockey	30	42	13	6	20	3	113:145	-32
6	HC Alleghe	30	42	12	7	21	2	132:144	-12
7	HC Fassa	22	42	10	1	25	6	104:161	-57
8	SG Pontebba	18	42	8	5	28	1	107:166	-59

== Playoffs ==
=== Semifinals ===
Series	Standing	Game 1	Game 2	Game 3	Game 4	Game 5
Ritten Sport (1) - HC Pustertal (4)	4:1	7:3 (5:0, 2:1, 0:2)	2:3 (0:1, 1:1, 1:1)	6:2 (3:0, 1:1, 2:1)	3:1 (1:0, 1:1, 1:0)	6:2 (2:2, 4:0, 0:0)
HC Bolzano (2) - SG Cortina (3)	4:0	3:1 (2:1, 0:0, 1:0)	5:2 (2:1, 1:0, 2:1)	4:3 OT (1:2, 0:1, 2:0, 1:0)	4:3 OT (1:0, 2:3, 0:0, 1:0)	

=== Final ===
Series	Standing	Game 1	Game 2	Game 3	Game 4
Ritten Sport (1) - HC Bolzano (2)	0:4	2:4 (1:1, 0:2, 1:1)	0:1 OT (0:0, 0:0, 0:0, 0:1)	2:3 OT (0:1, 1:0, 1:1, 0:1)	3:7 (2:3, 1:1, 0:3)

== Playdowns ==
=== Quarterfinals ===
Series	Standing	Game 1	Game 2	Game 3	Game 4	Game 5
AS Asiago Hockey (5) - SG Pontebba (8)	3:0	6:3 (2:2, 1:1, 3:0)	4:3 (2:1, 1:1, 1:1)	5:3 (1:1, 2:1, 2:1)		
HC Alleghe (6) - HC Fassa (7)	3:2	4:3 (1:1, 2:1, 1:1)	3:1 (1:0, 2:1, 0:0)	3:5 (1:2, 2:2, 0:1)	3:6 (2:2, 1:3, 0:1)	6:3 (2:1, 2:0, 2:2)

=== Semifinals ===
Series	Standing	Game 1	Game 2	Game 3	Game 4
HC Fassa (7) - SG Pontebba (8)	1:3	4:2 (1:1, 2:1, 1:0)	2:4 (0:2, 2:2, 0:0)	3:4 (0:2, 2:0, 1:2)	1:4 (0:2, 1:1, 0:1)

=== Final ===
Series	Game 1	Game 2
HC Fassa (7) - WSV Sterzing Broncos (Serie A2 winner)	4:2 (0:0, 0:2, 4:0)	8:4 (3:1, 3:2, 2:1)
