= Ice hockey at the 2010 Winter Olympics – Men's qualification =

Qualification for the men's tournament at the 2010 Winter Olympics.

== Qualification ==
Twelve teams qualified for the ice hockey event. The top nine teams in the IIHF World Ranking after the 2008 Men's World Ice Hockey Championship received automatic berths into the ice hockey event. All remaining member federations could attempt to qualify for the remaining three spots in the Olympics. The four lowest entrants (32nd ranked Bulgaria, 36th ranked Spain, 37th ranked Mexico, and 41st ranked Turkey) played off for a spot in the first round. Teams then ranked 19th through 30th (except China who declined) played in a first qualification round in November 2008, where the top three teams from the round advanced to the second qualification round. Teams ranked 10th through 18th joined the three top teams from the first qualifying round to play in a second qualification round. The top three teams from the second qualifying round advanced to the Olympic ice hockey tournament.

=== Qualified teams ===
| Event | Date | Location | Vacancies | Qualified |
|---|---|---|---|---|
| 2008 IIHF World Ranking | 30 April 2005 – 18 May 2008 | (Canada) Quebec City and Halifax | 9 | Canada; Russia; Sweden; Finland; Czech Republic; United States; Switzerland; Slovakia; Belarus |
| Final qualification tournament | 5–8 February 2009 | (Germany) Hanover | 1 | Germany |
| Final qualification tournament | 5–8 February 2009 | (Latvia) Riga | 1 | Latvia |
| Final qualification tournament | 5–8 February 2009 | (Norway) Oslo | 1 | Norway |
| TOTAL | | | 12 | |

Notes

1. ^{a} 2008 IIHF World Ranking were comprising the following events: 2005 World Championships, 2006 Winter Olympic Games, 2006 World Championships, 2007 World Championships and 2008 World Championships.
2. ^{b} Quebec City and Halifax were sites for 2008 World Championship; at the conclusion of the tournament the ranking were finalized with regards to the qualification slots.
3. ^{c} Canada, Czech Republic, Finland and Sweden had been mathematically determined to qualify for the 2010 Olympics before the start of the 2008 World Championship.

=== IIHF World Rating ===
| Qualified directly to Olympic Tournament |
| Final qualification |
| Pre-qualification |
| Preliminary qualification |

| Rank | Team | WC 2008 (100%) | WC 2007 (75%) | WC 2006 (50%) | OLY 2006 (50%) | WC 2005 (25%) | Total |
|---|---|---|---|---|---|---|---|
| 1 | Canada | 1160 | 1200 | 1100 | 1020 | 1160 | 3410 |
| 2 | Russia | 1200 | 1120 | 1060 | 1100 | 1120 | 3400 |
| 3 | Sweden | 1100 | 1100 | 1200 | 1200 | 1100 | 3400 |
| 4 | Finland | 1120 | 1160 | 1120 | 1160 | 1020 | 3385 |
| 5 | Czech Republic | 1060 | 1020 | 1160 | 1120 | 1200 | 3265 |
| 6 | United States | 1040 | 1060 | 1020 | 1000 | 1040 | 3105 |
| 7 | Switzerland | 1020 | 1000 | 960 | 1040 | 1000 | 3020 |
| 8 | Slovakia | 880 | 1040 | 1000 | 1060 | 1060 | 2955 |
| 9 | Belarus | 960 | 920 | 1040 | 880 | 940 | 2845 |
| 10 | Germany | 940 | 960 | 800 | 940 | 840 | 2740 |
| 11 | Latvia | 920 | 880 | 940 | 900 | 960 | 2740 |
| 12 | Norway | 1000 | 860 | 920 | 860 | 800 | 2735 |
| 13 | Denmark | 900 | 940 | 880 | 800 | 860 | 2660 |
| 14 | Italy | 820 | 900 | 860 | 920 | 780 | 2580 |
| 15 | Slovenia | 840 | 800 | 820 | 780 | 880 | 2460 |
| 16 | Austria | 800 | 840 | 780 | 840 | 820 | 2445 |
| 17 | Ukraine | 760 | 820 | 900 | 760 | 920 | 2435 |
| 18 | France | 860 | 780 | 740 | 820 | 740 | 2410 |
| 19 | Kazakhstan | 740 | 720 | 840 | 960 | 900 | 2405 |
| 20 | Hungary | 780 | 760 | 680 | 700 | 720 | 2220 |
| 21 | Poland | 700 | 740 | 720 | 740 | 760 | 2175 |
| 22 | Japan | 720 | 700 | 700 | 720 | 660 | 2120 |
| 23 | Lithuania | 660 | 620 | 760 | 620 | 620 | 1970 |
| 24 | Netherlands | 620 | 640 | 640 | 680 | 700 | 1935 |
| 25 | Estonia | 600 | 680 | 660 | 640 | 680 | 1930 |
| 26 | Croatia | 640 | 560 | 600 | 580 | 560 | 1790 |
| 27 | Romania | 560 | 600 | 560 | 660 | 600 | 1770 |
| 28 | China | 500 | 580 | 540 | 600 | 580 | 1650 |
| 29 | Great Britain | 680 | 660 | 620 | | 640 | 1645 |
| 30 | Serbia | 480 | 440 | 440 | 540 | 500 | 1425 |
| 31 | South Korea | 580 | 540 | 520 | | 480 | 1365 |
| 32 | Bulgaria | 380 | 380 | 500 | 560 | 440 | 1305 |
| 33 | Australia | 540 | 520 | 480 | | 520 | 1300 |
| 34 | Belgium | 520 | 500 | 460 | | 420 | 1230 |
| 35 | Israel | 420 | 460 | 580 | | 540 | 1190 |
| 36 | Spain | 460 | 480 | 400 | | 400 | 1120 |
| 37 | Mexico | 440 | 400 | 380 | | 320 | 1010 |
| 38 | Iceland | 400 | 420 | 320 | | 360 | 965 |
| 39 | New Zealand | 360 | 340 | 360 | | 380 | 890 |
| 40 | Ireland | 340 | 320 | 260 | | 260 | 775 |
| 41 | Turkey | 260 | 360 | 300 | | 340 | 765 |
| 42 | South Africa | 300 | 280 | 340 | | 300 | 755 |
| 43 | Luxembourg | 280 | 300 | 240 | | 280 | 695 |
| 44 | North Korea | 320 | | 420 | | 460 | 645 |
| 45 | Mongolia | 220 | 260 | | | | 415 |
| 46 | Greece | 240 | | | | | 240 |
| 47 | Bosnia and Herzegovina | 200 | | | | | 200 |
| 48 | Armenia | | | 280 | | 240 | 200 |

== Qualification tournament ==
=== Olympic preliminary qualification ===
==== Group A ====
| Pos | Team | Pld | W | OTW | OTL | L | GF | GA | GD | Pts | Qualification |
|---|---|---|---|---|---|---|---|---|---|---|---|
| 1 | Spain | 3 | 2 | 0 | 0 | 1 | 24 | 8 | +16 | 6 (Note: Spain 3 Pts, +3GD; Bulgaria 3 Pts, 0GD; Mexico 3 Pts, –3GD.) | Olympic pre-qualification |
| 2 | Bulgaria | 3 | 2 | 0 | 0 | 1 | 16 | 8 | +8 | 6 | |
| 3 | Mexico | 3 | 2 | 0 | 0 | 1 | 16 | 12 | +4 | 6 | |
| 4 | Turkey (H) | 3 | 0 | 0 | 0 | 3 | 3 | 31 | −28 | 0 | |

Source: IIHF.com
(H) Host
Notes:

All times are local (UTC+2).

| 9 October 2008; 15:30 | Mexico | 2–6 (1–2, 0–3, 1–1) | Bulgaria | Genclik Spor il Mudurlugu Ice Arena, Ankara; Attendance: 50 |

Game reference

Andrés de la Garma
Alfonso de Alba
Goalies
Todor Petkov
Referee:
(France) Alexandre Bourreau
Linesmen:
(Hungary) Gábor Mayer
(Turkey) Timucin Ozbukucu

| | 0–1 | 06:08 – Muhachov (Bachvarov, Yotov) (PP) |
| | 0–2 | 11:58 – Muhachov (Yotov) |
| Arroyo (Cervantes) (PP) – 13:09 | 1–2 |
| | 1–3 | 26:00 – Yotov (Morgunov) (PP) |
| | 1–4 | 31:41 – Yotov (Bachvarov, Morgunov) (PP) |
| | 1–5 | 32:09 – Mladenov |
| O'Farrill – 49:50 | 2–5 |
| | 2–6 | 55:54 – Muhachov (Bachvarov) (PP) |

30 min
Penalties
42 min
45
Shots
25

| 9 October 2008; 19:00 | Spain | 14–1 (2–1, 6–0, 6–0) | Turkey | Genclik Spor il Mudurlugu Ice Arena, Ankara; Attendance: 465 |

Game reference

José Luis Alonso
Aaron Carretero
Goalies
Levent Özbaydogan
Referee:
(United Kingdom) Mathew Thompson
Linesmen:
(Slovakia) Martin Gašparík
(Belgium) Filip Kalse

| | 0–1 | 00:28 – Coşkun (Hamarat) |
| Roshchyn (Gracia) (PP) – 02:37 | 1–1 |
| Santanatalia (Parra) – 17:54 | 2–1 |
| Gracia (G. Betrán, Roshchyn) – 27:20 | 3–1 |
| Barnola (Gracia) – 30:41 | 4–1 |
| Pedraz (J. Muñoz, A. Betrán) (PP) – 33:14 | 5–1 |
| Bernet (P. Muñoz) – 34:40 | 6–1 |
| Gracia (Brabo) – 37:20 | 7–1 |
| Codina (P. Muñoz) – 38:20 | 8–1 |
| Roshchyn (Gracia) – 46:33 | 9–1 |
| J. Muñoz (Pedraz, R. Betrán) (PP2) – 48:37 | 10–1 |
| P. Muñoz (Bernet, Codina) (PP) – 55:24 | 11–1 |
| Pedraz (J. Muñoz, A. Betrán) (PP2) – 56:50 | 12–1 |
| Codina (Armiño, Bernet) (PP) – 58:57 | 13–1 |
| Santanatalia (Bastien) – 59:57 | 14–1 |

18 min
Penalties
52 min
62
Shots
13

| 10 October 2008; 15:30 | Spain | 4–5 (3–2, 1–2, 0–1) | Mexico | Genclik Spor il Mudurlugu Ice Arena, Ankara; Attendance: 125 |

Game reference

José Luis Alonso
Goalies
Alfonso de Alba
Referee:
(Belgium) Yves Bekkers
Linesmen:
(Turkey) Timucin Ozbukucu
(Romania) Cosmin Topârceanu

| G. Betrán (Roshchyn, Barnola) (PP) – 03:45 | 1–0 |
| | 1–1 | 06:29 – Arroyo (Sierra, Miller) (PP2) |
| Hernández (J. Muñoz, Pedraz) (PP) – 11:51 | 2–1 |
| | 2–2 | 15:34 – Cervantes (De la Vega, Ortega) (PP) |
| P. Muñoz (Bernet, Paz) – 18:16 | 3–2 |
| | 3–3 | 27:53 – Canseco (Zavala, Rosette) (SH) |
| P. Muñoz (Brabo) (SH) – 34:28 | 4–3 |
| | 4–4 | 39:08 – Sierra (Ortega, Ugarte) (PP2) |
| | 4–5 | 51:05 – Arroyo (De la Vega) (PP) |

26 min
Penalties
36 min
30
Shots
22

| 10 October 2008; 19:00 | Bulgaria | 8–0 (2–0, 3–0, 3–0) | Turkey | Genclik Spor il Mudurlugu Ice Arena, Ankara; Attendance: 350 |

Game reference

Todor Petkov
Goalies
Levent Özbaydogan
Referee:
(France) Alexandre Bourreau
Linesmen:
(Slovakia) Martin Gašparík
(Hungary) Gábor Mayer

| Muhachov (Yotov, Vasilev) (PP) – 03:30 | 1–0 |
| Muhachov (Yotov) (SH) – 19:41 | 2–0 |
| Morgunov (Giyrov, Yotov) (PP) – 27:40 | 3–0 |
| Hristov (Slavov, Mladenov) (PP) – 31:42 | 4–0 |
| Bachvarov (Yotov, Boyadjiev) – 38:20 | 5–0 |
| Yotov – 51:45 | 6–0 |
| Hristov (Slavov, Mladenov) – 53:49 | 7–0 |
| Bachvarov (Yotov) – 55:46 | 8–0 |

16 min
Penalties
24 min
38
Shots
24

| 11 October 2008; 14:30 | Bulgaria | 2–6 (0–1, 1–4, 1–1) | Spain | Genclik Spor il Mudurlugu Ice Arena, Ankara; Attendance: 146 |

Game reference

Konstantin Mihailov
Todor Petkov
Goalies
José Luis Alonso
Referee:
(United Kingdom) Mathew Thompson
Linesmen:
(Slovakia) Martin Gašparík
(Turkey) Timucin Ozbukucu

| | 0–1 | 04:30 – Codina (P. Muñoz) |
| | 0–2 | 24:43 – A. Betrán (Brabo) |
| | 0–3 | 25:11 – Brabo (Pedraz) |
| | 0–4 | 27:41 – J. Muñoz (Pedraz) |
| | 0–5 | 29:09 – J. Muñoz (A. Betrán, Pedraz) (PP2) |
| Yotov (Vasilev, Morgunov) (PP) – 30:53 | 1–5 |
| | 1–6 | 44:45 – G. Betrán (Roshchyn, Barnola) (SH) |
| Yotov – 47:27 | 2–6 |

30 min
Penalties
24 min
20
Shots
47

| 11 October 2008; 18:00 | Turkey | 2–9 (0–3, 1–2, 1–4) | Mexico | Genclik Spor il Mudurlugu Ice Arena, Ankara; Attendance: 256 |

Game reference

Levent Özbaydogan
Cihan Kahraman
Goalies
Andrés de la Garma
Referee:
(Belgium) Yves Bekkers
Linesmen:
(Belgium) Filip Kalse
(Romania) Cosmin Topârceanu

| | 0–1 | 06:06 – Glennie (Cervantes) |
| | 0–2 | 15:56 – Sierra (Cervantes, Arroyo) (PP) |
| | 0–3 | 17:08 – Cervantes (Arroyo) (PP) |
| | 0–4 | 23:07 – Arroyo (Ortega) (PP) |
| | 0–5 | 28:39 – Arroyo (Cervantes, Sierra) (PP2) |
| Akyıldız – 34:48 | 1–5 |
| İnce (Karakoç, Hamarat) (PP) – 41:18 | 2–5 |
| | 2–6 | 44:18 – Zavala (Arroyo) |
| | 2–7 | 49:00 – Roberts (Glennie, De la Vega) (PP2) |
| | 2–8 | 50:22 – Barberena (Sierra) (PP2) |
| | 2–9 | 57:03 – Glennie (Cervantes, Roberts) |

28 min
Penalties
16 min
10
Shots
39

=== Olympic pre-qualification ===
==== Group B ====
| Pos | Team | Pld | W | OTW | OTL | L | GF | GA | GD | Pts | Qualification |
|---|---|---|---|---|---|---|---|---|---|---|---|
| 1 | Kazakhstan | 3 | 3 | 0 | 0 | 0 | 31 | 2 | +29 | 9 | Final Olympic qualification |
| 2 | Estonia (H) | 3 | 2 | 0 | 0 | 1 | 14 | 12 | +2 | 6 | |
| 3 | Netherlands | 3 | 1 | 0 | 0 | 2 | 10 | 14 | −4 | 3 | |
| 4 | Spain | 3 | 0 | 0 | 0 | 3 | 2 | 29 | −27 | 0 | |

Source: IIHF.com
(H) Host

All times are local (UTC+2).

| 6 November 2008; 16:00 | Kazakhstan | 17–0 (7–0, 6–0, 4–0) | Spain | Kreenholm Ice Hall, Narva; Attendance: 432 |

Game reference

Aleksey Kuznetsov
Sergey Ogureshnikov
Goalies
Pablo Muriel
Aarón Carretero
Referee:
(Latvia) Raimonds Garda
Linesmen:
(Latvia) Andrejs Korsaks
(Estonia) Anton Semionov

| Starchenko (Gavrilin, Zhailauov) – 01:03 | 1–0 |
| Shin (Kostrikov, Yessirkenov) – 01:56 | 2–0 |
| Krasnoslobodtsev (Rymarev) – 02:08 | 3–0 |
| Gavrilin (Vyatkin, Fadeyev) – 04:16 | 4–0 |
| Smolyaninov (Alexandrov, Spiridonov) – 09:21 | 5–0 |
| Vyatkin (PP) – 12:57 | 6–0 |
| Lakiza (Rymarev, Yessirkenov) (PP) – 15:36 | 7–0 |
| Alexandrov (Smolyaninov) (SH) – 27:37 | 8–0 |
| Savchenko (Shin) – 28:32 | 9–0 |
| Zhailauov (PP) – 30:01 | 10–0 |
| Spiridonov (Alexandrov, Smolyaninov) – 36:11 | 11–0 |
| Shin (Kostrikov, Yessirkenov) – 36:49 | 12–0 |
| Zhailauov (Gavrilin) – 39:00 | 13–0 |
| Kostrikov (Shin, Yessirkenov) – 48:58 | 14–0 |
| Gavrilin (Starchenko) (PP) – 51:36 | 15–0 |
| Kostrikov (Shin, Yessirkenov) – 53:33 | 16–0 |
| Yessirkenov (Kostrikov, Shin) – 59:02 | 17–0 |

10 min
Penalties
12 min
62
Shots
7

| 6 November 2008; 20:00 | Netherlands | 4–6 (2–1, 1–1, 1–4) | Estonia | Kreenholm Ice Hall, Narva; Attendance: 560 |

Game reference

Phil Groeneveld
Goalies
Aleksei Terentjev
Referee:
(Russia) Andrei Biriukov
Linesmen:
(Norway) Jacob Matheson
(Russia) Sergey Mikhaevich

| Smulders (Schaafsma) – 04:20 | 1–0 |
| Kars (Van den Heuvel) – 09:52 | 2–0 |
| | 2–1 | 18:55 – Ivanov (Suur) (PP) |
| | 2–2 | 30:27 – Sorokin (Suur, Sibirtsev) |
| Van Bentem (Willemse) (PP) – 35:23 | 3–2 |
| Schaafsma (Smulders, Euverman) (PP) – 42:52 | 4–2 |
| | 4–3 | 43:25 – Süvaoja (Kaljuste) |
| | 4–4 | 45:44 – Titarenko (Semjonov) (PP) |
| | 4–5 | 54:11 – Kuznetsov (Jastrebov) |
| | 4–6 | 59:29 – Sibirtsev (Suur) (SH, ENG) |

12 min
Penalties
12 min
34
Shots
47

| 7 November 2008; 16:00 | Netherlands | 4–1 (0–1, 2–0, 2–0) | Spain | Kreenholm Ice Hall, Narva; Attendance: 155 |

Game reference

Ian Meierdres
Goalies
Pablo Muriel
Referee:
(Norway) Per Gustav Solem
Linesmen:
(Latvia) Andrejs Korsaks
(Norway) Jacob Matheson

| | 0–1 | 19:05 – P. Muñoz (Brabo) (PP) |
| Tummers (Van Oorschot) (PP2) – 20:24 | 1–1 |
| Kars (Van Bentem, Van den Heuvel) – 24:58 | 2–1 |
| Postma (Van Oorschot, Schaafsma) – 45:07 | 3–1 |
| Postma (Tummers) (SH) – 54:49 | 4–1 |

24 min
Penalties
20 min
55
Shots
13

| 7 November 2008; 20:00 | Estonia | 0–7 (0–4, 0–2, 0–1) | Kazakhstan | Kreenholm Ice Hall, Narva; Attendance: 1,200 |

Game reference

Aleksei Terentjev
Villem-Henrik Koitmaa
Goalies
Alexey Kuznetsov
Referee:
(Latvia) Raimonds Garda
Linesmen:
(Russia) Sergey Mikhaevich
(Finland) Antti Suni

| 0–1 | 06:21 – Starchenko (Fadeyev, Vyatkin) (PP) |
| 0–2 | 08:56 – Fadeyev (Vyatkin, Starchenko) (PP) |
| 0–3 | 09:56 – Spiridonov |
| 0–4 | 12:58 – Spiridonov (Smolyaninov) (SH) |
| 0–5 | 23:22 – Alexandrov (Spiridonov, Argokov) |
| 0–6 | 29:21 – Litvinenko (Solaryov) (PP) |
| 0–7 | 42:04 – Zhailauov (Starchenko, Vyatkin) |

26 min
Penalties
8 min
21
Shots
60

| 9 November 2008; 16:00 | Kazakhstan | 7–2 (2–1, 3–1, 2–0) | Netherlands | Kreenholm Ice Hall, Narva; Attendance: 206 |

Game reference

Sergey Ogureshnikov
Goalies
Phil Groeneveld
Referee:
(Russia) Andrei Biriukov
Linesmen:
(Estonia) Anton Semionov
(Finland) Antti Suni

| Krasnoslobodtsev (Solaryov, Rymarev) (PP) – 03:36 | 1–0 |
| | 1–1 | 05:21 – Natte (Teunissen) |
| Zhailauov (Litvinenko) (SH) – 12:55 | 2–1 |
| Rymarev (Litvinenko, Solaryov) – 22:28 | 3–1 |
| | 3–2 | 27:44 – Schaafsma (Postma) |
| Gavrilin (Litvinenko, Argokov) (PP) – 37:27 | 4–2 |
| Spiridonov (Alexandrov) – 38:52 | 5–2 |
| Solaryov (Litvinenko, Lakiza) – 42:01 | 6–2 |
| Solaryov (Smolyaninov, Krasnoslobodtsev) – 52:56 | 7–2 |

31 min
Penalties
16 min
63
Shots
16

| 9 November 2008; 20:00 | Spain | 1–8 (0–2, 1–3, 0–3) | Estonia | Kreenholm Ice Hall, Narva; Attendance: 635 |

Game reference

Pablo Muriel
Aarón Carretero
Goalies
Villem-Henrik Koitmaa
Referee:
(Norway) Per Gustav Solem
Linesmen:
(Latvia) Andrejs Korsaks
(Norway) Jacob Matheson

| | 0–1 | 08:43 – Sorokin (Ivanov, Sibirtsev) |
| | 0–2 | 12:33 – Ossipov (Ivanov, Sibirtsev) (PP) |
| | 0–3 | 21:56 – O. Sildre (P. Sildre) |
| | 0–4 | 23:18 – Titarenko (Kuznetsov) |
| Pedraz (P. Muñoz) – 25:01 | 1–4 |
| | 1–5 | 37:27 – Jastrebov (Titarenko, Kuznetsov) |
| | 1–6 | 41:02 – O. Sildre (Süvaoja) |
| | 1–7 | 46:00 – P. Sildre (O. Sildre) |
| | 1–8 | 56:39 – Sibirtsev (Ivanov) (PP) |

12 min
Penalties
8 min
13
Shots
51

==== Group C ====
| Pos | Team | Pld | W | OTW | OTL | L | GF | GA | GD | Pts | Qualification |
|---|---|---|---|---|---|---|---|---|---|---|---|
| 1 | Hungary (H) | 3 | 3 | 0 | 0 | 0 | 20 | 4 | +16 | 9 | Final Olympic qualification |
| 2 | Lithuania | 3 | 2 | 0 | 0 | 1 | 13 | 9 | +4 | 6 | |
| 3 | Croatia | 3 | 1 | 0 | 0 | 2 | 8 | 11 | −3 | 3 | |
| 4 | Serbia | 3 | 0 | 0 | 0 | 3 | 4 | 21 | −17 | 0 | |

Source: IIHF.com
(H) Host

All times are local (UTC+1).

| 7 November 2008; 14:30 | Lithuania | 4–2 (0–2, 3–0, 1–0) | Croatia | Budapest Arena, Budapest; Attendance: 400 |

Game reference

Nerijus Dauksevičius
Goalies
Vanja Belić
Referee:
(Denmark) Bo Andersen
Linesmen:
(Finland) Attila Abonyi
(France) Eric Bouguin

| | 0–1 | 07:33 – Ciganović (Žibret) |
| | 0–2 | 19:59 – Žibret (Novosel, Lovrenčić) (PP) |
| Nekraševičius (Aliukonis) – 28:21 | 1–2 |
| Vaiciukevičius (Nausėda, Kieras) (PP) – 30:23 | 2–2 |
| M. Šlikas (Vaiciukevičius, Kuliešius) – 37:01 | 3–2 |
| Aliukonis (Vaiciukevičius, Šlikas) – 40:27 | 4–2 |

28 min
Penalties
18 min
33
Shots
22

| 7 November 2008; 18:00 | Hungary | 9–1 (4–0, 1–1, 4–0) | Serbia | Budapest Arena, Budapest; Attendance: 6,500 |

Game reference

Levente Szuper
Zoltán Hetényi
Goalies
Milan Luković
Fedor Aranicki
Referee:
(Estonia) Igor Chernyshov
Linesmen:
(Sweden) Peter Lyth
(Czech Republic) Tomáš Pešek

| Svasznek (Ladányi) (PP) – 02:37 | 1–0 |
| Ondrejcik (Majoross, Sofron) – 12:19 | 2–0 |
| Ladányi (J. Vas, Svasznek) – 13:58 | 3–0 |
| Palkovics (Ocskay) – 16:38 | 4–0 |
| Ondrejcik – 23:04 | 5–0 |
| | 5–1 | 30:19 – Pajić (Gabrić) (PP) |
| Ocskay (Palkovics) – 43:08 | 6–1 |
| Vaszjunyin (Sofron, Kangyal) – 47:28 | 7–1 |
| J. Vas (Tokaji, Ladányi) – 47:53 | 8–1 |
| Horváth (Ocskay, Tokaji) (PP) – 54:18 | 9–1 |

12 min
Penalties
14 min
51
Shots
11

| 8 November 2008; 14:00 | Lithuania | 7–2 (0–1, 4–1, 3–0) | Serbia | Budapest Arena, Budapest; Attendance: 1,500 |

Game reference

Artūras Kuzmičius
Goalies
Milan Luković
Referee:
(Germany) Roland Aumüller
Linesmen:
(Finland) Attila Abonyi
(Sweden) Peter Lyth

| | 0–1 | 17:03 – Nadaski (Milosavljević) |
| Ivanuskin (Kuliešius, Bernatavičius) (PP) – 26:49 | 1–1 |
| Kuliešius (Vaiciukevičius, Nekraševičius) (PP) – 29:29 | 2–1 |
| | 2–2 | 30:23 – Pajić |
| Bernatavičius – 36:18 | 3–2 |
| Kuliešius (Vaiciukevičius) – 36:16 | 4–2 |
| K. Šlikas (Ivanuskin, Vėželis) – 49:57 | 5–2 |
| Kulevičius (Bernatavičius) – 50:55 | 6–2 |
| Kaminskas (Kulevičius, Bernatavičius) (PP) – 58:27 | 7–2 |

34 min
Penalties
28 min
54
Shots
29

| 8 November 2008; 17:30 | Croatia | 1–6 (0–2, 0–3, 1–1) | Hungary | Budapest Arena, Budapest; Attendance: 7,898 |

Game reference

Vanja Belić
Goalies
Zoltán Hetényi
Referee:
(Denmark) Bo Andersen
Linesmen:
(France) Eric Bouguin
(United Kingdom) Andrew Dalton

| | 0–1 | 06:06 – Horváth (Ocskay, Fekete) (PP) |
| | 0–2 | 08:40 – Ocskay (Palkovics) |
| | 0–3 | 25:54 – J. Vas (Ladányi, Ennafatti) (PP) |
| | 0–4 | 28:59 – Peterdi (Tokaji) |
| | 0–5 | 39:34 – Ondrejcik (Majoross) |
| Ciganović (Žibret) – 45:22 | 1–5 |
| | 1–6 | 59:04 Fekete (Ocskay) |

32 min
Penalties
14 min
15
Shots
56

| 9 November 2008; 14:00 | Serbia | 1–5 (0–1, 1–3, 0–1) | Croatia | Budapest Arena, Budapest; Attendance: 1,683 |

Game reference

Fedor Aranicki
Goalies
Vanja Belić
Referee:
(Estonia) Igor Chernyshov
Linesmen:
(France) Eric Bouguin
(United Kingdom) Andrew Dalton

| | 0–1 | 11:01 – Grozaj (Smerdelj) |
| | 0–2 | 20:32 – Ciganović (Lovrenčić, Brumerčik) |
| Sretović (PP) – 34:26 | 1–2 |
| | 1–3 | 35:42 – Ciganović (Žibret) |
| | 1–4 | 38:06 – Lovrenčić (Žibret) (PP) |
| | 1–5 | 56:22 – Kanaet (Smerdelj) (PP) |

30 min
Penalties
22 min
35
Shots
33

| 9 November 2008; 17:30 | Hungary | 5–2 (3–1, 0–0, 2–1) | Lithuania | Budapest Arena, Budapest; Attendance: 8,520 |

Game reference

Levente Szuper
Goalies
Nerijus Dauksevičius
Referee:
(Germany) Roland Aumüller
Linesmen:
(Sweden) Peter Lyth
(Czech Republic) Tomáš Pešek

| J. Vas (Tokaji, Ladányi) (PP) – 06:42 | 1–0 |
| Holéczy (Peterdi, Kovács) (PP) – 08:43 | 2–0 |
| | 2–1 | 13:14 – Kuliešius (Nekraševičius) |
| Ladányi (M. Vas, Horváth) (PP) – 13:57 | 3–1 |
| | 3–2 | 47:23 – Kaminskas (Kieras) (PP) |
| J. Vas (M. Vas, Ladányi) – 48:51 | 4–2 |
| Palkovics (Ocskay, Sille) (SH) – 51:14 | 5–2 |

20 min
Penalties
24 min
52
Shots
22

==== Group D ====
| Pos | Team | Pld | W | OTW | OTL | L | GF | GA | GD | Pts | Qualification |
|---|---|---|---|---|---|---|---|---|---|---|---|
| 1 | Japan | 3 | 3 | 0 | 0 | 0 | 12 | 2 | +10 | 9 | Final Olympic qualification |
| 2 | Poland (H) | 3 | 1 | 1 | 0 | 1 | 13 | 6 | +7 | 5 | |
| 3 | Great Britain | 3 | 1 | 0 | 1 | 1 | 14 | 6 | +8 | 4 | |
| 4 | Romania | 3 | 0 | 0 | 0 | 3 | 2 | 27 | −25 | 0 | |

Source: IIHF.com
(H) Host

All times are local (UTC+1).

| 6 November 2008; 15:30 | Japan | 7–0 (3–0, 3–0, 1–0) | Romania | Sanok Arena, Sanok; Attendance: 600 |

Game reference

Naoya Kikuchi
Goalies
Szabolcs Molnár
Referee:
(Germany) Wilhelm Schimm
Linesmen:
(Poland) Grzegorz Klich
(Germany) Mario Linnek

| Tanaka (PS) – 07:32 | 1–0 |
| Yamashita (Keller) (PP) – 08:54 | 2–0 |
| Domeki (Kawai, Ta. Saito) – 19:08 | 3–0 |
| Iimura (Kawai, Obara) (PP) – 22:35 | 4–0 |
| M. Ogawa (Kamino, Kon) – 36:15 | 5–0 |
| Iimura (Suzuki, Mitani) – 38:45 | 6–0 |
| Yamashita (Keller, Te. Saito) (PP) – 42:06 | 7–0 |

10 min
Penalties
26 min
42
Shots
18

| 6 November 2008; 19:30 | Poland | 3–2 GWS (1–1, 1–0, 0–1) (OT: 0–0) (SO: 1–0) | Great Britain | Sanok Arena, Sanok; Attendance: 2,500 |

Game reference

Rafał Radziszewski
Goalies
Stephen Murphy
Referee:
(Czech Republic) Radek Husička
Linesmen:
(Slovakia) Rastislav Gajan
(Italy) Luca Zatta

| | 0–1 | 06:02 – Clarke (Chambers) (PP) |
| Urbanowicz (Bagiński) – 08:44 | 1–1 |
| Zapała (Dronia) (PP) – 30:53 | 2–1 |
| | 2–2 | 56:21 – Meyers (Shields) |

D. Słaboń
Shootout

18 min
Penalties
12 min
31
Shots
23

| 7 November 2008; 15:45 | Japan | 2–1 (1–1, 1–0, 0–0) | Great Britain | Sanok Arena, Sanok; Attendance: 300 |

Game reference

Masahito Haruna
Goalies
Stevie Lyle
Referee:
(Finland) Tuomo Sorakangas
Linesmen:
(Poland) Grzegorz Klich
(Czech Republic) Vít Lederer

| Tanaka (Kawai, Iimura) – 17:50 | 1–0 |
| | 1–1 | 18:33 – Weaver (Chambers) |
| Obara (SH) – 27:48 | 2–1 |

10 min
Penalties
4 min
34
Shots
30

| 7 November 2008; 19:15 | Romania | 1–9 (1–3, 0–3, 0–3) | Poland | Sanok Arena, Sanok; Attendance: 2,400 |

Game reference

Adrian Catrinoi Cornea
Goalies
Rafał Radziszewski
Przemysław Odrobny
Referee:
(Germany) Wilhelm Schimm
Linesmen:
(Slovakia) Rastislav Gajan
(Germany) Mario Linnek

| | 0–1 | 00:19 – Zapała (Proszkiewicz, Łopuski) |
| | 0–2 | 03:29 – Łopuski (Proszkiewicz, Gonera) |
| Moldován (Nagy, Kosa) (PP) – 15:02 | 1–2 |
| | 1–3 | 18:02 – Kolusz (Urbanowicz, Dronia) |
| | 1–4 | 31:10 – Piekarski (Laszkiewicz, Jaros) |
| | 1–5 | 37:05 – Borzęcki (Łopuski, Piekarski) (PP) |
| | 1–6 | 37:55 – Proszkiewicz (Słaboń) |
| | 1–7 | 40:52 – Słaboń |
| | 1–8 | 47:42 – Zapała (Gonera) (PP) |
| | 1–9 | 51:20 – Dronia (Kowalówka) |

14 min
Penalties
10 min
20
Shots
47

| 9 November 2008; 14:30 | Great Britain | 11–1 (4–0, 3–1, 4–0) | Romania | Sanok Arena, Sanok; Attendance: 800 |

Game reference

Stevie Lyle
Goalies
Adrian Catrinoi Cornea
Szabolcs Molnár
Referee:
(Finland) Tuomo Sorakangas
Linesmen:
(Germany) Mario Linnek
(Italy) Luca Zatta

| Weaver (Meyers, J. Phillips) – 04:55 | 1–0 |
| Shields (Weaver, Chambers) – 05:45 | 2–0 |
| Cowley (Sample, Richardson) – 07:23 | 3–0 |
| Clarke (Chambers) (PP2) – 17:12 | 4–0 |
| Tait (Chambers, Lyle) – 22:43 | 5–0 |
| | 5–1 | 25:22 – Antal (Z. Molnár) |
| Owen (SH) – 36:15 | 6–1 |
| D. Phillips (Chambers, J. Phillips) – 37:43 | 7–1 |
| J. Phillips (Meyers) – 46:01 | 8–1 |
| Clarke (Tait, Walton) – 48:03 | 9–1 |
| Richardson (Clarke, Tait) (PP) – 52:30 | 10–1 |
| Jamieson (Sample, Cowley) (PP) – 58:09 | 11–1 |

10 min
Penalties
26 min
56
Shots
19

| 9 November 2008; 18:15 | Poland | 1–3 (0–3, 1–0, 0–0) | Japan | Sanok Arena, Sanok; Attendance: 4,000 |

Game reference

Rafał Radziszewski
Goalies
Masahito Haruna
Referee:
(Czech Republic) Radek Husička
Linesmen:
(Slovakia) Rastislav Gajan
(Czech Republic) Vít Lederer

| | 0–1 | 09:07 – Iumura (Kawai) (PP) |
| | 0–2 | 09:31 – Domeki (Keller) |
| | 0–3 | 12:44 – Obara (Suzuki, Keller) (PP) |
| Zapała (Dołęga) – 28:57 | 1–3 |

30 min
Penalties
14 min
34
Shots
24

=== Final Olympic qualification ===
==== Group E ====
| Pos | Team | Pld | W | OTW | OTL | L | GF | GA | GD | Pts | Qualification |
|---|---|---|---|---|---|---|---|---|---|---|---|
| 1 | Germany (H) | 3 | 3 | 0 | 0 | 0 | 11 | 3 | +8 | 9 | 2010 Winter Olympics |
| 2 | Austria | 3 | 1 | 1 | 0 | 1 | 10 | 7 | +3 | 5 | |
| 3 | Japan | 3 | 0 | 1 | 0 | 2 | 8 | 16 | −8 | 2 (Note: Slovenia 4–5 Japan) | |
| 4 | Slovenia | 3 | 0 | 0 | 2 | 1 | 8 | 11 | −3 | 2 | |

Source: IIHF.com
(H) Host
Notes:

All times are local (UTC+1).

| 5 February 2009; 16:00 | Slovenia | 3–4 OT (0–0, 3–2, 0–1) (OT: 0–1) | Austria | TUI Arena, Hanover; Attendance: 1,016 |

Game reference

Robert Kristan
Goalies
Bernd Brückler
Referees:
(Finland) Sami Partanen
(Sweden) Ulf Rönnmark
Linesmen:
(Belarus) Ivan Dedioulia
(Germany) Felix Winnekens

| Hebar (Terglav) – 21:48 | 1–0 |
| | 1–1 | 24:52 – Grabner (A. Lakos) (PP) |
| M. Rodman (Razingar) – 30:30 | 2–1 |
| | 2–2 | 35:39 – Grabner (Unterluggauer) (PP) |
| M. Rodman (Hebar, D. Rodman) – 39:44 | 3–2 |
| | 3–3 | 55:01 – Koch (Kalt) |
| | 3–4 | 63:40 – A. Lakos (Setzinger) |

10 min
Penalties
32 min
19
Shots
27

| 5 February 2009; 19:30 | Germany | 7–1 (3–1, 3–0, 1–0) | Japan | TUI Arena, Hanover; Attendance: 4,318 |

Game reference

Dimitri Pätzold
Dennis Endras
Goalies
Masahito Haruna
Hisashi Ishikawa
Referees:
(Canada) Chris Savage
(Czech Republic) Vladimír Šindler
Linesmen:
(Czech Republic) Jiří Gebauer
(Switzerland) Tobias Wehrli

| Seidenberg (SH) – 03:57 | 1–0 |
| Wolf (Gogulla, Hackert – 06:07 | 2–0 |
| Gogulla (Hackert, Wolf) (PP) – 15:00 | 3–0 |
| | 3–1 | 19:01 – Domeki (Keller, Kon) (PP) |
| Klinge (Felski, Barta) – 31:28 | 4–1 |
| R. Müller (Mulock, Rankel) – 31:57 | 5–1 |
| Tripp (Ullmann) – 32:55 | 6–1 |
| Tripp (Reiss, M. Müller) (PP) – 53:22 | 7–1 |

18 min
Penalties
8 min
30
Shots
13

| 7 February 2009; 12:00 | Slovenia | 4–5 GWS (2–1, 2–1, 0–2) (OT: 0–0) (SO: 0–1) | Japan | TUI Arena, Hanover; Attendance: 2,380 |

Game reference

Robert Kristan
Goalies
Masahito Haruna
Referees:
(Finland) Sami Partanen
(Czech Republic) Vladimír Šindler
Linesmen:
(Ukraine) Andrii Kicha
(Germany) Felix Winnekens

| Razingar (Terglav) – 00:59 | 1–0 |
| Jan (Razinger) – 11:37 | 2–0 |
| | 2–1 | 16:45 – Domeki (Kon) |
| | 2–2 | 27:02 – Kawai (Osawa) (PP) |
| Mušič (Terlikar, Tavželj) – 28:45 | 3–2 |
| Kranjc (Hebar (PP) – 30:34 | 4–2 |
| | 4–3 | 47:00 – Ishioka |
| | 4–4 | 56:12 – Tanaka (Suzuki, Obara) (PP2) |

Shootout
Tanaka
16 min
Penalties
12 min
31
Shots
30

| 7 February 2009; 15:30 | Austria | 1–2 (0–0, 1–2, 0–0) | Germany | TUI Arena, Hanover; Attendance: 5,034 |

Game reference

Bernd Brückler
Goalies
Dimitri Pätzold
Referees:
(Sweden) Ulf Rönnmark
(Canada) Chris Savage
Linesmen:
(Belarus) Ivan Dedioulia
(Switzerland) Tobias Wehrli

| | 0–1 | 22:04 – Seidenberg |
| Kalt – 30:49 | 1–1 |
| | 1–2 | 33:03 – Tripp (Schmidt) (PP) |

10 min
Penalties
10 min
28
Shots
16

| 8 February 2009; 13:30 | Japan | 2–5 (0–1, 1–3, 1–1) | Austria | TUI Arena, Hanover; Attendance: 1,423 |

Game reference

Masahito Haruna
Goalies
Juergen Penker
Referees:
(Sweden) Ulf Rönnmark
(Canada) Chris Savage
Linesmen:
(Switzerland) Tobias Wehrli
(Germany) Felix Winnekens

| | 0–1 | 13:05 – Grabner (R. Lukas, Raffl) |
| | 0–2 | 26:39 – Grabner (P. Lakos) |
| | 0–3 | 31:30 – Welser (Setzinger) (PP) |
| | 0–4 | 31:55 – Grabner |
| Mitani (Keller) (PP) – 34:45 | 1–4 |
| Obara (Ishioka) – 42:59 | 2–4 |
| | 2–5 | 48:25 – P. Lakos (Setzinger) |

8 min
Penalties
10 min
20
Shots
32

| 8 February 2009; 17:00 | Germany | 2–1 (1–0, 1–0, 0–1) | Slovenia | TUI Arena, Hanover; Attendance: 3,758 |

Game reference

Dennis Endras
Goalies
Andrej Hočevar
Referees:
(Finland) Sami Partanen
(Czech Republic) Vladimír Šindler
Linesmen:
(Czech Republic) Jiří Gebauer
(Ukraine) Andrii Kicha

| Hackert (Bakos) – 12:22 | 1–0 |
| Mulock (Barta, Klinge) – 21:12 | 2–0 |
| | 2–1 | 48:07 – Mušič (Šivic) |

16 min
Penalties
14 min
25
Shots
23

==== Group F ====
| Pos | Team | Pld | W | OTW | OTL | L | GF | GA | GD | Pts | Qualification |
|---|---|---|---|---|---|---|---|---|---|---|---|
| 1 | Latvia (H) | 3 | 3 | 0 | 0 | 0 | 15 | 6 | +9 | 9 | 2010 Winter Olympics |
| 2 | Ukraine | 3 | 1 | 1 | 0 | 1 | 9 | 9 | 0 | 5 | |
| 3 | Italy | 3 | 1 | 0 | 0 | 2 | 7 | 8 | −1 | 3 | |
| 4 | Hungary | 3 | 0 | 0 | 1 | 2 | 7 | 15 | −8 | 1 | |

Source: IIHF.com
(H) Host

All times are local (UTC+2).

| 5 February 2009; 15:00 | Italy | 2–3 (0–1, 0–0, 2–2) | Ukraine | Arena Riga, Riga; Attendance: 1,100 |

Game reference

Thomas Tragust
Goalies
Igor Karpenko
Referees:
(Slovakia) Vladimír Baluška
(Czech Republic) Milan Minář
Linesmen:
(Latvia) Ansis Eglītis
(Finland) Antti Orelma

| | 0–1 | 14:38 – Varlamov (Kasianchuk, Navarenko) (PP) |
| | 0–2 | 52:52 – Varlamov (Timchenko, Kasianchuk) |
| | 0–3 | 54:28 – Materukhin (Pobiedonostsev) |
| Scandela (Fontanive, Ansoldi) – 55:11 | 1–3 |
| Ramoser (Souza, Pittis) – 55:37 | 2–3 |

12 min
Penalties
8 min
24
Shots
36

| 5 February 2009; 19:00 | Latvia | 7–3 (1–1, 3–2, 3–0) | Hungary | Arena Riga, Riga; Attendance: 4,900 |

Game reference

Edgars Masaļskis
Goalies
Levente Szuper
Referees:
(Norway) Ole Hansen
(Sweden) Marcus Vinnerborg
Linesmen:
(Austria) Christian Kaspar
(Sweden) Peter Sabelström

| | 0–1 | 07:06 – Ladányi (M. Vas, J. Vas) |
| Sprukts (K. Rēdlihs, Karsums) (PP) – 12:33 | 1–1 |
| Reķis (Sprukts, Ankipans) (PP) – 25:16 | 2–1 |
| Dārziņš – 26:03 | 3–1 |
| | 3–2 | 29:05 – M. Vas (Ladányi, Sille) (PP) |
| Karsums (Sprukts, Reķis) –30:37 | 4–2 |
| | 4–3 | 37:59 – Svasznek (Sille, Ladányi) (PP) |
| Vasiļjevs (Dārziņš, Sorokins) – 48:05 | 5–3 |
| Dārziņš (M. Rēdlihs, Vasiljevs) – 57:57 | 6–3 |
| Karsums (Ankipans, K. Rēdlihs) (PP) – 59:29 | 7–3 |

8 min
Penalties
18 min
43
Shots
14

| 6 February 2009; 15:00 | Italy | 4–1 (2–0, 1–0, 1–1) | Hungary | Arena Riga, Riga; Attendance: 900 |

Game reference

Adam Russo
Goalies
Levente Szuper
Zoltán Hetényi
Referees:
(Slovakia) Vladimír Baluška
(Czech Republic) Milan Minář
Linesmen:
(Latvia) Ansis Eglītis
(Czech Republic) Vít Lederer

| Ansoldi (Fontanive, Scandella) – 13:42 | 1–0 |
| Aquino (Iannone, Chitarroni) – 14:17 | 2–0 |
| Pittis (Scandella, Strazzabosco) (PP) – 27:29 | 3–0 |
| Chittaroni (Gallace) (SH) – 45:44 | 4–0 |
| | 4–1 | 58:49 – Svasznek (Ladányi, Sille) (PP) |

20 min
Penalties
12 min
24
Shots
26

| 6 February 2009; 19:00 | Ukraine | 2–4 (1–0, 0–2, 1–2) | Latvia | Arena Riga, Riga; Attendance: 8,250 |

Game reference

Referees:
(Norway) Ole Hansen
(Sweden) Marcus Vinnerborg
Linesmen:
(Finland) Antti Orelma
(Sweden) Peter Sabelström

| Sriubko (Tsyrul) (PP) – 18:57 | 1–0 |
| | 1–1 | 24:40 – Karsums (M. Rēdlihs, Sorokins) (PP) |
| | 1–2 | 33:38 – M. Rēdlihs |
| | 1–3 | 47:31 –Ņiživijs (Cipruss) |
| Klymentiev (Gnidenko, Navarenko) – 58:48 | 2–3 |
| | 2–4 | 59:45 – Sprukts (Karsums, Reķis) (ENG) |

48 min
Penalties
30 min
25
Shots
18

| 8 February 2009; 13:00 | Hungary | 3–4 GWS (0–0, 2–0, 1–3) (OT: 0–0) (SO: 0–1) | Ukraine | Arena Riga, Riga; Attendance: 1,900 |

Game reference

Levente Szuper
Goalies
Kostiantyn Simchuk
Referees:
(Slovakia) Vladimír Baluška
(Czech Republic) Milan Minář
Linesmen:
(Austria) Christian Kaspar
(Czech Republic) Vít Lederer

| J. Vas (Ladányi, Horváth) – 21:47 | 1–0 |
| Ocskay (Palkovics) (PP) – 31:28 | 2–0 |
| | 2–1 | 51:39 – Timchenko (Salnikov) |
| | 2–2 | 54:41 – Materukhin (Pobiedonstsev |
| Palkovics (Horváth, Vaszjunyin) (PP) – 57:25 | 3–2 |
| | 3–3 | 58:44 – Shakhraychuk (PP) |

Shootout
Varlamov
22 min
Penalties
14 min
18
Shots
35

| 8 February 2009; 17:00 | Latvia | 4–1 (2–0, 1–0, 1–1) | Italy | Arena Riga, Riga; Attendance: 10,000 |

Game reference

Sergejs Naumovs
Goalies
Thomas Tragust
Referees:
(Norway) Ole Hansen
(Sweden) Marcus Vinnerborg
Linesmen:
(Finland) Antti Orelma
(Sweden) Peter Sabelström

| Ankipāns (Sprukts) – 08:48 | 1–0 |
| Cipulis (Sotnieks, Cipruss) (PP) – 10:01 | 2–0 |
| Karsums (Sprukts) (SH) – 34:25 | 3–0 |
| | 3–1 | 40:15 – Scandella (Borgatello) (PP) |
| Dārziņš (Sprukts, Ankipans) – 42:59 | 4–1 |

12 min
Penalties
18 min
46
Shots
31

==== Group G ====
| Pos | Team | Pld | W | OTW | OTL | L | GF | GA | GD | Pts | Qualification |
|---|---|---|---|---|---|---|---|---|---|---|---|
| 1 | Norway (H) | 3 | 3 | 0 | 0 | 0 | 10 | 6 | +4 | 9 | 2010 Winter Olympics |
| 2 | Denmark | 3 | 1 | 0 | 1 | 1 | 7 | 9 | −2 | 4 | |
| 3 | Kazakhstan | 3 | 1 | 0 | 0 | 2 | 11 | 7 | +4 | 3 | |
| 4 | France | 3 | 0 | 1 | 0 | 2 | 6 | 12 | −6 | 2 | |

Source: IIHF.com
(H) Host

All times are local (UTC+1).

| 5 February 2009; 15:00 | Denmark | 1–2 OT (1–0, 0–0, 0–1) (OT: 0–1) | France | Jordal Amfi, Oslo; Attendance: 325 |

Game reference

Patrick Galbraith
Goalies
Fabrice Lhenry
Referees:
(Russia) Rafael Kadyrov
(United States) Rick Looker
Linesmen:
(Finland) Stefan Fonselius
(Norway) Thomas Gienke

| Nielsen (Larsen) (PP) – 08:11 | 1–0 |
| | 1–1 | 43:19 – Bordeleau (Besch) |
| | 1–2 | 61:18 – Amar (Bellemare) (PP) |

10 min
Penalties
8 min
27
Shots
16

| 5 February 2009; 19:00 | Norway | 2–1 (0–0, 2–1, 0–0) | Kazakhstan | Jordal Amfi, Oslo; Attendance: 2,069 |

Game reference

Pål Grotnes
Goalies
Aleksey Kuznetsov
Referees:
(Sweden) Sören Persson
(Finland) Jyri Rönn
Linesmen:
(Sweden) Fredrik Carlman
(Russia) Yuriy Oskirko

| Thoresen (Vikingstad) – 26:49 | 1–0 |
| | 1–1 | 29:55 – Krasnoslobodsev |
| Vikingstad (Skrøder, Myrvold) (PP) – 33:00 | 2–1 |

8 min
Penalties
14 min
24
Shots
21

| 7 February 2009; 13:00 | Denmark | 3–2 (1–1, 1–0, 1–1) | Kazakhstan | Jordal Amfi, Oslo; Attendance: 455 |

Game reference

Patrick Galbraith
Goalies
Aleksey Kuznetsov
Referees:
(United States) Rick Looker
(Finland) Jyri Rönn
Linesmen:
(Sweden) Fredrik Carlman
(Norway) Thomas Gienke

| | 0–1 | 04:58 – Savchenko (Rymarev) |
| Eller (Johnsen, Green) – 05:34 | 1–1 |
| Damgaard (L. Degn, K. Degn) – 34:54 | 2–1 |
| Green (Eller, Thomassen) – 46:36 | 3–1 |
| | 3–2 | 59:59 – Kasatkin (Savchenko) (EA) |

8 min
Penalties
22 min
35
Shots
21

| 7 February 2009; 17:00 | France | 2–3 (0–1, 1–2, 1–0) | Norway | Jordal Amfi, Oslo; Attendance: 2,313 |

Game reference

Fabrice Lhenry
Goalies
Pål Grotnes
Referees:
(Russia) Rafael Kadyrov
(Sweden) Sören Persson
Linesmen:
(Russia) Yuriy Oskirko
(Switzerland) Daniel Wirth

| | 0–1 | 17:32 – Vikingstad (Thoresen) |
| Bellemare – 27:15 | 1–1 |
| | 1–2 | 35:52 – Vikingstad (Skrøder, Thoresen) |
| | 1–3 | 37:43 – Ask (Lorentzen) (SH) |
| Coqueux – 40:17 | 2–3 |

12 min
Penalties
12 min
21
Shots
27

| 8 February 2009; 13:00 | Kazakhstan | 8–2 (2–0, 3–1, 3–1) | France | Jordal Amfi, Oslo; Attendance: 314 |

Game reference

Aleksey Kuznetsov
Ivan Poloshkov
Goalies
Eddy Ferhi
Referees:
(Russia) Rafael Kadyrov
(Sweden) Sören Persson
Linesmen:
(Norway) Thomas Gienke
(Switzerland) Daniel Wirth

| Starchenko (Antipin) – 05:50 | 1–0 |
| Savchenko (Solaryov, Krasnoslobodtsev) – 06:13 | 2–0 |
| Solaryov (Krasnoslobodtsev) – 25:27 | 3–0 |
| Ogorodnikov (Rifel) – 26:08 | 4–0 |
| Kasatkin – 33:40 | 5–0 |
| | 5–1 | 37:16 – Rozenthal (Desrosiers, Besch) (PP2) |
| Rifel (Ogorodnikov) – 48:40 | 6–1 |
| Gavrilin (Antipin, Koreshkov) (PP) – 53:42 | 7–1 |
| Krasnoslobodtsev (Solaryov) – 54:10 | 8–1 |
| | 8–2 | 58:53 – Tardif (Raux) (SH) |

18 min
Penalties
16 min
27
Shots
30

| 8 February 2009; 17:00 | Norway | 5–3 (1–2, 2–0, 2–1) | Denmark | Jordal Amfi, Oslo; Attendance: 3,014 |

Game reference

Pål Grotnes
Goalies
Patrick Galbraith
Referees:
(United States) Rick Looker
(Finland) Jyri Rönn
Linesmen:
(Sweden) Fredrik Carlman
(Finland) Stefan Fonselius

| | 0–1 | 00:45 – Bødker (Damgaard) |
| Spets (Hansen) – 04:09 | 1–1 |
| | 1–2 | 14:43 – Hardt (L. Degn, K. Degn) (PP) |
| Thoresen (Skrøder, Trygg) (PP) – 27:54 | 2–2 |
| Thoresen (Vikingstad) – 37:26 | 3–2 |
| Holøs (Trygg) (PP) – 49:40 | 4–2 |
| | 4–3 | 56:36 – Olsen (K. Degn) |
| Thoresen (Vikingstad) – 58:13 | 5–3 |

26 min
Penalties
12 min
34
Shots
25

== See also ==
- IIHF World Ranking
