= Raffl (surname) =

Raffl is a surname. Notable people with the surname include:

- Errich Raffl, Austrian luger
- Hansjörg Raffl (born 1958), Italian luger
- Michael Raffl (born 1988), Austrian professional ice hockey
- Peter Raffl (born 1960), Austrian ice hockey player and coach
- Thomas Raffl (born 1986), Austrian ice hockey winger
