= 2008 IIHF World Championship Division I =

Tournament details
- Host countries: Austria; Japan
- Venues: 2 (in 2 host cities)
- Dates: 13–19 April 2008
- Teams: 12

The 2008 IIHF World Championship Division I was two international ice hockey tournaments organized by the International Ice Hockey Federation. Division I represents the second level of the Ice Hockey World Championships. The best team in each tournament, Austria and Hungary, advanced to the Top Division championship for 2009. The bottom teams in each group, South Korea and Estonia, were relegated to the lower-level Division II.

== Group A tournament ==
The Group A tournament was played in Innsbruck, Austria, from 13 to 19 April 2008.

=== Participating teams ===
Team	Qualification
Austria	Hosts; placed 15th in Top Division last year and were relegated
Poland	Placed 2nd in Division I Group A last year
Kazakhstan	Placed 3rd in Division I Group A last year
Great Britain	Placed 4th in Division I Group B last year
Netherlands	Placed 5th in Division I Group A last year
South Korea	Placed 1st in Division II Group B last year and were promoted

=== Final standings ===
Pos	Team	Pld	W	OTW	OTL	L	GF	GA	GD	Pts	Promotion or relegation
1	Austria (H)	5	5	0	0	0	34	12	+22	15	Promoted to the 2009 Top Division
2	Kazakhstan	5	3	1	0	1	21	12	+9	11	
3	Poland	5	2	1	1	1	18	17	+1	9	
4	Great Britain	5	2	0	1	2	19	17	+2	7	
5	Netherlands	5	0	1	0	4	15	30	−15	2	
6	South Korea	5	0	0	1	4	8	27	−19	1	Relegated to the 2009 Division II

Source: IIHF
(H) Host

=== Match results ===
All times are local.

13 April 2008; 13:30	Netherlands	3–6 (1–3, 1–0, 1–3)	Kazakhstan	TWK Arena; Attendance: 1,354

Game reference
James Schaafsma 13:31 (PP2), 28:52 (EQ); Bjorn Willemse 47:31 (EQ) / Goals / 3:52 (PP1) Alexei Savchenko, 9:57 (EQ) Ilya Solarev, 19:47 (PP2) Maxim Balyayev; 41:59 (EQ), 45:07 (EQ) Lev Krutokhvostov; 59:35 (EN) Alexey Vyatkin

13 April 2008; 17:00	Great Britain	1–2 (GWS) (0–1, 1–0, 0–0) (0–0, 0–1)	Poland	TWK Arena; Attendance: 2,490

Game reference
Greg Chambers 26:14 (EQ) / Goals / 15:11 (EQ) Maciej Urbanowicz, 65:00 (GWS) Krzysztof Zapała

13 April 2008; 20:30	South Korea	0–8 (0–3, 0–4, 0–1)	Austria	TWK Arena; Attendance: 3,100

Game reference
Goals / 01:48 (EQ), 32:59 (EQ) Christoph Brandner, 04:27 (EQ) Roland Kaspitz, 17:23 (PP1) Dieter Kalt, 24:23 (EQ) Thomas Koch, 28:17 (EQ) Thomas Raffl, 35:38 (EQ) Oliver Setzinger, 40:52 (PP1) Martin Oraze

14 April 2008; 13:30	Poland	6–4 (2–2, 1–1, 3–1)	Netherlands	TWK Arena; Attendance: 1,090

Game reference
Leszek Laszkiewicz 03:35 (PP1), 24:25 (SH1), Marcin Kolusz 15:54 (EQ), Adrian Labryga 40:56 (EQ), Maciej Urbanowicz 42:09 (EQ), Adam Borzęcki 51:53 (PP1) / Goals / 10:29 (EQ) Nicky De Jong, 19:59 (PP1) Nathaniel Korthuis, 27:49 (PS) Douglas Stienstra, 59:55 (PS) Bradley Smulders

14 April 2008; 17:00	Kazakhstan	5–1 (2–0, 1–0, 2–1)	South Korea	TWK Arena; Attendance: 1,270

Game reference
Artemiy Lakiza 02:04 (PP1), Andrey Gavrilin 15:37 (EQ), 44:09 (EQ), Yevgeniy Fadeyev 39:25 (EQ), Alexey Vorontsov 45:20 (EQ) / Goals / 52:54 (EQ) Kim Ki-sung

14 April 2008; 20:30	Austria	10–5 (4–3, 3–0, 3–2)	Great Britain	TWK Arena; Attendance: 3,100

Game reference
Marco Pewal 02:55 (EQ), Roland Kaspitz 08:23 (EQ), Gerd Gruber 13:21 (EQ), Oliver Setzinger 16:04 (PP1), 42:08 (EQ), Thomas Koch 23:38 (EQ), Gerhard Unterluggauer 25:59 (PP1), Thomas Vanek 33:33 (PP1), 41:07 (PP2), 49:46 (PP1) / Goals / 07:55 (PP1) Greg Chambers, 14:23 (PP1) Ashley Tait, 17:57 (EQ) Thomas Watkins, 42:52 (PP1) Jonathan Weaver, 56:17 (PP1) David Clarke

16 April 2008; 13:30	South Korea	1–4 (0–1, 0–1, 1–2)	Great Britain	TWK Arena; Attendance: 897

Game reference
Cho Min Ho 50:42 (EQ) / Goals / 01:29 (EQ) David Clarke, 31:39 (EQ) David Longstaff, 46:52 (EQ) Daniel Meyers, 58:13 (SH1) Ashley Tait

16 April 2008; 17:00	Poland	3–4 (GWS) (0–1, 0–1, 3–1) (0–0, 0–1)	Kazakhstan	TWK Arena; Attendance: 2,132

Game reference
Krzysztof Zapała 40:49 (EQ), Leszek Laszkiewicz 48:27 (EQ), Marcin Jaros 56:30 (EQ) / Goals / 09:40 (PP1) Andrey Gavrilin, 22:17 (EQ) Andrei Spiridonov, 44:20 (EQ) Yevgeniy Ushkov, 65:00 (GWS) Konstantin Kassatkin

16 April 2008; 20:30	Austria	5–1 (0–0, 1–1, 4–0)	Netherlands	TWK Arena; Attendance: 3,100

Game reference
Philipp Lukas 20:57 (EQ), Christoph Brandner 43:58 (PP1), Dieter Kalt 47:01 (PP1), Thomas Vanek 52:48 (EQ), 54:08 (EQ) / Goals / 33:58 (EQ) Douglas Stienstra

18 April 2008; 13:30	Great Britain	8–1 (2–0, 4–0, 2–1)	Netherlands	TWK Arena; Attendance: 1,249

Game reference
Gregory Owen 05:36 (EQ), 28:34 (PP1), 47:59 (EQ), Jonathan Phillips 11:15 (EQ), Jonathan Weaver 34:04 (EQ), Greg Chambers 36:25 (EQ), 40:36 (SH1), Thomas Watkins 37:45 (EQ) / Goals / 59:02 (PP2) Jacobus Teunissen

18 April 2008; 17:00	Poland	4–1 (0–0, 2–1, 2–0)	South Korea	TWK Arena; Attendance: 2,005

Game reference
Krzysztof Zapała 26:27 (PP1), Marcin Jaros 37:15 (EQ), Jarosław Różański 50:54 (EQ), Sebastian Kowalówka 56:30 (EQ) / Goals / 24:18 (EQ) Kim Kyu Hun

18 April 2008; 20:30	Kazakhstan	3–4 (1–1, 1–2, 1–1)	Austria	TWK Arena; Attendance: 3,200

Game reference
Lev Krutokhvostov 13:34 (EQ), Andrei Ogorodnikov 30:50 (EQ), Vladislav Kolesnikov 46:59 (EQ) / Goals / 01:14 (EQ) Martin Ulrich, 30:07 (SH1) Dieter Kalt, 35:43 (SH1) Daniel Welser, 56:51 (PP1) Christoph Brandner

19 April 2008; 13:30	Netherlands	6–5 (OT) (2–1, 2–3, 1–1) (1–0)	South Korea	TWK Arena; Attendance: 1,890

Game reference
Casey van Schagen 03:56 (EQ), Marcel Kars 15:43 (EQ), Jamie Schaafsma 46:59 (EQ), 64:23 (EQ); Bradley Smulders 30:18 (EQ), Doug Stienstra 58:59 (EQ) / Goals / 02:52 (EQ), 33:30 (PP1) Min Ho Cho, 28:07 (EQ) Woo Sang Park, 37:11 (EQ) Yong Jun Lee, 53:05 (EQ) Ki Sung Kim

19 April 2008; 17:00	Kazakhstan	3–1 (1–1, 0–0, 2–0)	Great Britain	TWK Arena; Attendance: 2,400

Game reference
Andrey Spiridonov 12:34 (EQ), 54:42 (EQ); Alexey Vyatkin 55:14 (EQ) / Goals / 06:28 (PP1) David Clarke

19 April 2008; 20:30	Austria	7–3 (1–1, 5–0, 1–2)	Poland	TWK Arena; Attendance: 3,200

Game reference
Jeremy Rebek 11:31 (EQ), Dieter Kalt 23:13 (PP2), 26:45 (EQ), Gerhard Unterluggauer 23:36 (PP1), 50:04 (PP1), Daniel Welser 31:55 (EQ), Philipp Lukas 39:10 (EQ), / Goals / 13:00 (EQ) Marcin Kolusz, 45:00 (EQ) Maciej Urbanowicz, 51:53 (EQ) Adrian Labryga

== Group B tournament ==
The Group B tournament was played in Sapporo, Japan, from 13 to 19 April 2008.

=== Participating teams ===
Team	Qualification
Ukraine	Placed 16th in Top Division last year and were relegated
Hungary	Placed 2nd in Division I Group B last year
Japan	Hosts; placed 3rd in Division I Group B last year
Estonia	Placed 4th in Division I Group A last year
Lithuania	Placed 5th in Division I Group B last year
Croatia	Placed 1st in Division II Group A last year and were promoted

=== Final standings ===
Pos	Team	Pld	W	OTW	OTL	L	GF	GA	GD	Pts	Promotion or relegation
1	Hungary	5	5	0	0	0	22	7	+15	15	Promoted to the 2009 Top Division
2	Ukraine	5	3	1	0	1	18	8	+10	11	
3	Japan (H)	5	3	0	1	1	19	10	+9	10	
4	Lithuania	5	2	0	0	3	9	21	−12	6	
5	Croatia	5	0	1	0	4	5	15	−10	2	
6	Estonia	5	0	0	1	4	9	21	−12	1	Relegated to the 2009 Division II

Source: IIHF
(H) Host

=== Match results ===
All times are local.

13 April 2008; 13:00	Croatia	0–4 (0–1, 0–1, 0–2)	Ukraine	Tsukisamu Gymnasium, Sapporo; Attendance: 593

Game reference
Goals / 8:42 (EQ) Yuri Dyachenko; 33:48 (PP2) Dmytro Tsuryl; 52:06 (EQ) Vadym Shakhraychuk; 52:27 (EQ) Oleksandr Karaulshchuk

13 April 2008; 16:30	Estonia	3–5 (1–2, 2–1, 0–2)	Hungary	Tsukisamu Gymnasium, Sapporo; Attendance: 978

Game reference
Maksim Ivanov 3:05 (PP1); Andrei Makrov 24:36 (PP2); Aleksander Polozov 34:03 (EQ) / Goals / 7:48 (EQ), 11:10 (PP1) Márton Vas; 39:04 (EQ), 45:30 (EQ) Csaba Kovács; 51:03 (EQ) Dániel Fekete

13 April 2008; 20:00	Lithuania	0–5 (0–4, 0–0, 0–1)	Japan	Tsukisamu Gymnasium, Sapporo; Attendance: 708

Game reference
Goals / 4:23 (PP1) Yosuke Kon; 9:09 (PP1) Masahito Nishiwaki; 12:55 (PP1) Sho Sato; 18:02 (EQ) Darcy Mitani; 41:28 (EQ) Ryuichi Kawai

14 April 2008; 13:00	Ukraine	3–1 (0–0, 2–1, 1–0)	Estonia	Tsukisamu Gymnasium, Sapporo; Attendance: 195

Game reference
Dmytro Tsyrul 28:58 (EQ); Yuri Navarenko 37:39 (SH1); Roman Salnikov 59:27 (ENG) / Goals / 22:15 (PP1) Andrei Makrov

14 April 2008; 16:30	Hungary	6–0 (2–0, 2–0, 2–0)	Lithuania	Tsukisamu Gymnasium, Sapporo; Attendance: 708

Game reference
Márton Vas 10:11 (PP1); Gábor Ocskay 11:31 (PP2), 58:37 (EQ); Krisztián Palkovics 29:22 (PP1); Csaba Kovács 36:31 (PS); Balázs Ladányi 59:31 (PP1) / Goals

14 April 2008; 20:00	Japan	3–0 (1–0, 0–0, 2–0)	Croatia	Tsukisamu Gymnasium, Sapporo; Attendance: 1,145

Game reference
Darcy Mitani 8:34 (PP1); Daisuke Obara 41:05 (PP1); Takahito Suzuki 56:24 (PP1) / Goals

16 April 2008; 13:00	Croatia	2–1 (GWS) (0–1, 1–0, 0–0) (0–0, 1–0)	Estonia	Tsukisamu Gymnasium, Sapporo; Attendance: 153

Game reference
Marko Lovrenčić 39:01 (PP1); Mario Novak 65:00 (GWS) / Goals / 13:30 (PP1) Ilja Urusev

16 April 2008; 16:30	Ukraine	6–1 (4–0, 1–1, 1–0)	Lithuania	Tsukisamu Gymnasium, Sapporo; Attendance: 438

Game reference
Vadym Shakhraychuk 0:47 (EQ); Kostiantyn Kasianchuk 8:15 (EQ); Andrei Sryubko 10:43 (PP1); Aleksandr Materukhin 16:01 (PS); Sergei Klimentiev 29:25 (EQ); Roman Salnikov 51:37 (EQ) / Goals / 35:47 (EQ) Tadas Kumeliauskas

16 April 2008; 20:00	Hungary	4–2 (0–0, 3–1, 1–1)	Japan	Tsukisamu Gymnasium, Sapporo; Attendance: 1,363

Game reference
Balázs Ladányi 26:45 (EQ); Krisztián Palkovics 27:46 (EQ), 59:25 (ENG); Gábor Ocskay 33:50 (SH1) / Goals / 37:37 (EQ) Sho Sato; 45:59 (EQ) Masahito Nishiwaki

18 April 2008; 13:00	Estonia	1–4 (0–1, 1–1, 0–2)	Lithuania	Tsukisamu Gymnasium, Sapporo; Attendance: 238

Game reference
Maksim Ivanov 38:00 (PP2) / Goals / 18:41 (EQ) Mindaugas Kieras; 22:00 (PP1) Darius Lelėnas; 44:08 (PP1) Dalius Vaiciukevičius; 59:47 (ENG) Egidijus Bauba

18 April 2008; 16:30	Hungary	3–0 (0–0, 1–0, 2–0)	Croatia	Tsukisamu Gymnasium, Sapporo; Attendance: 541

Game reference
Imre Peterdi 35:01 (EQ); Krisztián Palkovics 46:01 (EQ), 49:45 (PP1) / Goals

18 April 2008; 20:00	Japan	2–3 (GWS) (0–0, 2–2, 0–0) (0–0, 0–1)	Ukraine	Tsukisamu Gymnasium, Sapporo; Attendance: 1,879

Game reference
Suzuki Takahito 24:59 (EQ); Kamino Toru 36:49 (EQ) / Goals / Kostiantyn Kasianchuk 20:42 (PP1); Sergii Varlamov 39:09 (PP1); Dmytro Tsyrul 65:00 (GWS)

19 April 2008; 13:00	Lithuania	4–3 (0–2, 1–0, 3–1)	Croatia	Tsukisamu Gymnasium, Sapporo; Attendance: 989

Game reference
Dovydas Kulevičius 21:13 (PP1), 45:40 (EQ); Mindaugas Kieras 44:10 (PP2); Darius Lelėnas 58:18 (EQ) / Goals / Tomislav Čunko 14:35 (EQ); Veljko Žibret 15:20 (EQ); Krešimir Švigir 47:17 (EQ)

19 April 2008; 16:30	Japan	7–3 (4–2, 1–0, 2–1)	Estonia	Tsukisamu Gymnasium, Sapporo; Attendance: 2,386

Game reference
Saito Takeshi 2:14 (EQ), 41:43 (PP1); Aaron Keller 3:32 (EQ); Obara Daisuke 6:15 (PP1); Mitani Darcy 11:48 (EQ), 21:01 (PP1); Kon Yosuke 44:05 (EQ) / Goals / Maksim Ivanov 0:36 (EQ); Andrei Makrov 9:44 (EQ); Aleksei Sibirtsev 48:57 (PP1)

19 April 2008; 20:00	Ukraine	2–4 (0–2, 2–1, 0–1)	Hungary	Tsukisamu Gymnasium, Sapporo; Attendance: 2,544

Game reference
Oleg Blagoi 37:04 (EQ); Vitaliy Semenchenko 37:39 (SH1) / Goals / 10:27 (EQ) János Vas; 19:32 (PP1) Krisztián Palkovics; 21:46 (EQ) Imre Peterdi; 59:19 (SH1) Márton Vas
