= János Vas =

Hungarian ice hockey player (born 1984)

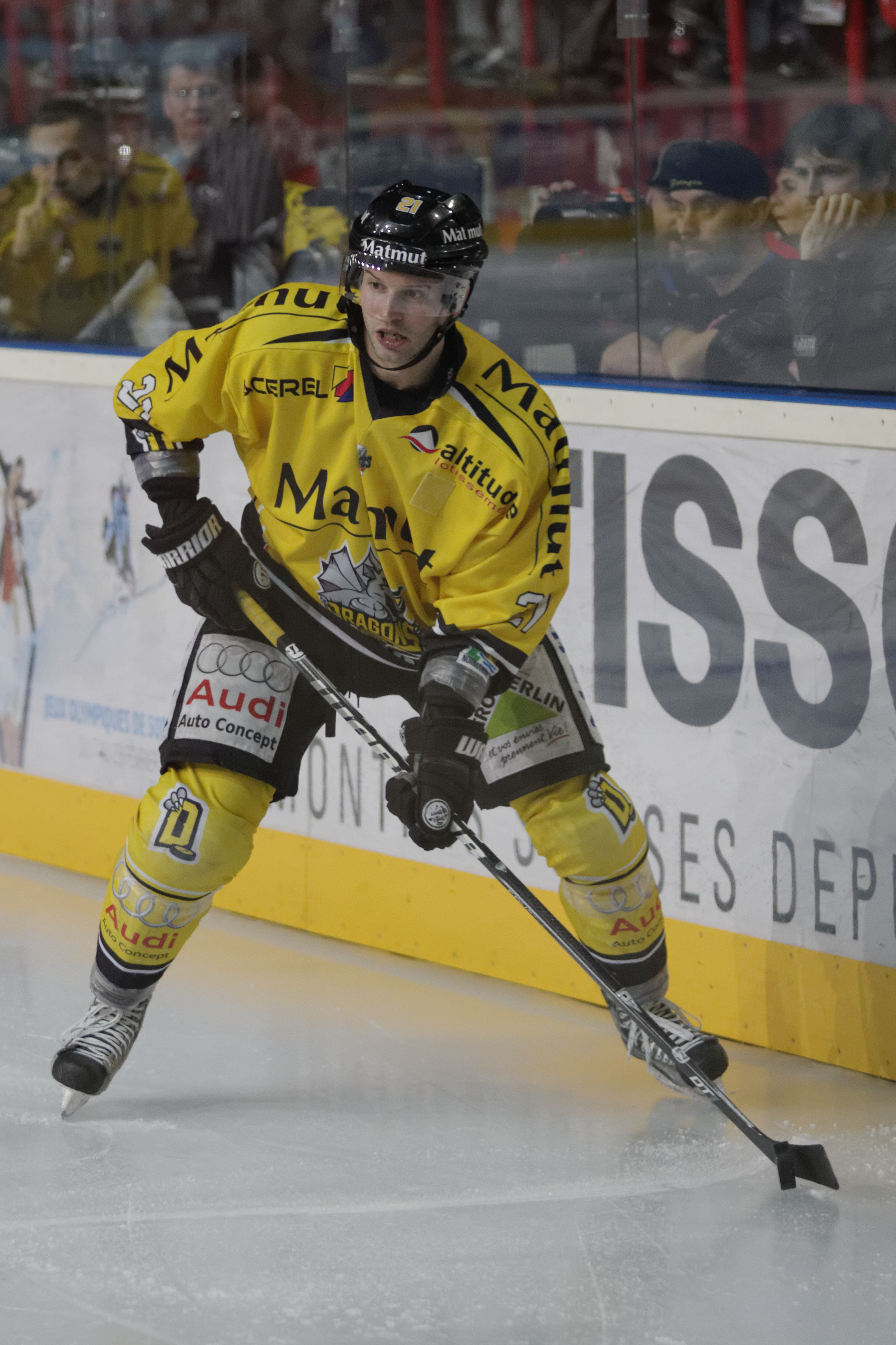
- Born: 29 January 1984 (age 42) Dunaújváros, Hungary
- Height: 6 ft 1 in (185 cm)
- Weight: 203 lb (92 kg; 14 st 7 lb)
- Position: Left wing
- Shot: Left
- Erste Liga team Former teams: DVTK Jegesmedvék; Malmö Redhawks; Iowa Stars; Brynäs IF; Fehérvár AV19; Ducs de Dijon; Dragons de Rouen; HC Slavia Praha; HC 21 Prešov
- National team: Hungary
- NHL draft: 32nd overall, 2002; Dallas Stars
- Playing career: 2002–2023

János Vas (born 29 January 1984) is a professional Hungarian ice hockey forward currently playing for DVTK Jegesmedvék of the Erste Liga.

Vas was drafted 32nd overall by the Dallas Stars of the National Hockey League in 2002 NHL entry draft. Vas has also played for the Iowa Stars of the American Hockey League, the Idaho Steelheads of the ECHL, and the Malmö Redhawks of the Elitserien. Additionally, Vas has represented the Hungarian national team in several international competitions.

== Career statistics ==
=== Regular season and playoffs ===
| | | | Regular season | | | | | Playoffs |
| Season | Team | League | GP | G | A | Pts | PIM | GP | G | A | Pts | PIM |
|---|---|---|---|---|---|---|---|---|---|---|---|---|
| 1999–2000 | Dunaújvárosi Acélbikák | HUN | 2 | 2 | 0 | 2 | 0 | — | — | — | — | — |
| 2000–01 | MIF Redhawks | J18 Allsv | 3 | 2 | 0 | 2 | 0 | — | — | — | — | — |
| 2000–01 | MIF Redhawks | J20 | 20 | 4 | 4 | 8 | 8 | 3 | 0 | 0 | 0 | 4 |
| 2001–02 | MIF Redhawks | J20 | 33 | 13 | 17 | 30 | 50 | 8 | 8 | 4 | 12 | 4 |
| 2001–02 | MIF Redhawks | J18 Allsv | — | — | — | — | — | 2 | 2 | 0 | 2 | 2 |
| 2002–03 | MIF Redhawks | J20 | 17 | 5 | 12 | 17 | 14 | — | — | — | — | — |
| 2002–03 | MIF Redhawks | SEL | 14 | 1 | 0 | 1 | 2 | — | — | — | — | — |
| 2002–03 | IF Troja/Ljungby | SWE.2 | 14 | 2 | 1 | 3 | 20 | 3 | 0 | 1 | 1 | 0 |
| 2003–04 | Malmö Redhawks | J20 | 15 | 5 | 3 | 8 | 14 | 8 | 5 | 2 | 7 | 33 |
| 2003–04 | Malmö Redhawks | SEL | 6 | 0 | 0 | 0 | 0 | — | — | — | — | — |
| 2003–04 | IK Pantern | SWE.3 | 3 | 0 | 2 | 2 | — | — | — | — | — | — |
| 2004–05 | Halmstad Hammers | SWE.2 | 39 | 9 | 8 | 17 | 10 | 2 | 0 | 1 | 1 | 2 |
| 2005–06 | Iowa Stars | AHL | 35 | 2 | 9 | 11 | 18 | 7 | 1 | 1 | 2 | 2 |
| 2005–06 | Idaho Steelheads | ECHL | 10 | 4 | 5 | 9 | 15 | — | — | — | — | — |
| 2006–07 | Iowa Stars | AHL | 72 | 13 | 13 | 26 | 42 | 10 | 1 | 1 | 2 | 2 |
| 2007–08 | Iowa Stars | AHL | 80 | 17 | 24 | 41 | 51 | — | — | — | — | — |
| 2008–09 | Brynäs IF | SEL | 52 | 1 | 5 | 6 | 10 | — | — | — | — | — |
| 2009–10 | SAPA Fehérvár AV19 | AUT | 53 | 15 | 12 | 27 | 22 | 5 | 1 | 2 | 3 | 0 |
| 2009–10 | SAPA Fehérvár AV19 | HUN | — | — | — | — | — | 7 | 4 | 4 | 8 | 6 |
| 2010–11 | Tingsryds AIF | SWE.2 | 52 | 21 | 6 | 27 | 6 | 10 | 2 | 4 | 6 | 0 |
| 2011–12 | IF Troja/Ljungby | SWE.2 | 45 | 12 | 12 | 24 | 47 | — | — | — | — | — |
| 2012–13 | Ducs de Dijon | FRA | 26 | 18 | 25 | 43 | 12 | 5 | 1 | 4 | 5 | 0 |
| 2013–14 | Dragons de Rouen | FRA | 25 | 11 | 20 | 31 | 12 | 9 | 2 | 6 | 8 | 2 |
| 2014–15 | HC Slavia Praha | ELH | 50 | 8 | 6 | 14 | 30 | — | — | — | — | — |
| 2015–16 | HC Slavia Praha | CZE.2 | 30 | 8 | 13 | 21 | 18 | 8 | 3 | 2 | 5 | 8 |
| 2016–17 | Fehérvár AV19 | AUT | 53 | 7 | 15 | 22 | 68 | — | — | — | — | — |
| 2016–17 | Fehérvári Titánok | MOL | — | — | — | — | — | 2 | 0 | 2 | 2 | 0 |
| 2017–18 | DVTK Jegesmedvék | EL | 38 | 24 | 23 | 47 | — | 5 | 1 | 0 | 1 | — |
| 2018–19 | DVTK Jegesmedvék | SVK | 54 | 14 | 35 | 49 | 53 | 3 | 0 | 1 | 1 | 0 |
| 2019–20 | DVTK Jegesmedvék | SVK | 49 | 11 | 28 | 39 | 30 | — | — | — | — | — |
| 2020–21 | DVTK Jegesmedvék | SVK | 44 | 4 | 23 | 27 | 42 | — | — | — | — | — |
| 2021–22 | Chamonix HC | FRA | 7 | 2 | 1 | 3 | 12 | — | — | — | — | — |
| 2021–22 | HC Prešov Penguins | SVK | 25 | 6 | 5 | 11 | 14 | 7 | 1 | 5 | 6 | 2 |
| SHL totals | | | 72 | 2 | 5 | 7 | 12 | — | — | — | — | — |
| AHL totals | | | 187 | 32 | 46 | 78 | 111 | 17 | 2 | 2 | 4 | 4 |
| SVK totals | | | 172 | 35 | 91 | 126 | 139 | 10 | 1 | 6 | 7 | 2 |

=== International ===
| Year | Team | Event | GP | G | A | Pts | PIM |
|---|---|---|---|---|---|---|---|
| 2000 | Hungary | EJC D1 | 4 | 2 | 6 | 8 | 31 |
| 2001 | Hungary | WC D1 | 5 | 0 | 2 | 2 | 2 |
| 2002 | Hungary | WJC D2 | 4 | 4 | 1 | 5 | 10 |
| 2002 | Hungary | WC D1 | 5 | 1 | 0 | 1 | 6 |
| 2003 | Hungary | WJC D2 | 2 | 3 | 5 | 8 | 10 |
| 2004 | Hungary | WJC D1 | 5 | 0 | 4 | 4 | 18 |
| 2005 | Hungary | OGQ | 3 | 2 | 0 | 2 | 4 |
| 2005 | Hungary | WC D1 | 5 | 1 | 1 | 2 | 6 |
| 2008 | Hungary | WC D1 | 3 | 1 | 0 | 1 | 2 |
| 2009 | Hungary | OGQ | 6 | 1 | 3 | 4 | 0 |
| 2009 | Hungary | WC | 5 | 0 | 1 | 1 | 29 |
| 2010 | Hungary | WC D1 | 5 | 1 | 2 | 3 | 4 |
| 2011 | Hungary | WC D1 | 4 | 1 | 2 | 3 | 0 |
| 2012 | Hungary | WC D1A | 5 | 1 | 1 | 2 | 2 |
| 2013 | Hungary | OGQ | 3 | 2 | 2 | 4 | 0 |
| 2013 | Hungary | WC D1A | 5 | 1 | 2 | 3 | 2 |
| 2014 | Hungary | WC D1A | 4 | 0 | 4 | 4 | 0 |
| 2015 | Hungary | WC D1A | 5 | 0 | 0 | 0 | 2 |
| 2016 | Hungary | OGQ | 3 | 0 | 0 | 0 | 0 |
| 2016 | Hungary | WC | 7 | 2 | 0 | 2 | 4 |
| 2017 | Hungary | WC D1A | 2 | 1 | 0 | 1 | 0 |
| 2018 | Hungary | WC D1A | 5 | 1 | 0 | 1 | 0 |
| 2019 | Hungary | WC D1A | 5 | 0 | 2 | 2 | 4 |
| 2021 | Hungary | OGQ | 3 | 0 | 0 | 0 | 0 |
| 2022 | Hungary | WC D1A | 4 | 0 | 0 | 0 | 0 |
| Junior totals | | | 15 | 9 | 16 | 25 | 69 |
| Senior totals | | | 92 | 16 | 22 | 38 | 67 |

- All statistics taken from NHL.com
