= Arvīds Reķis =

Latvian ice hockey player

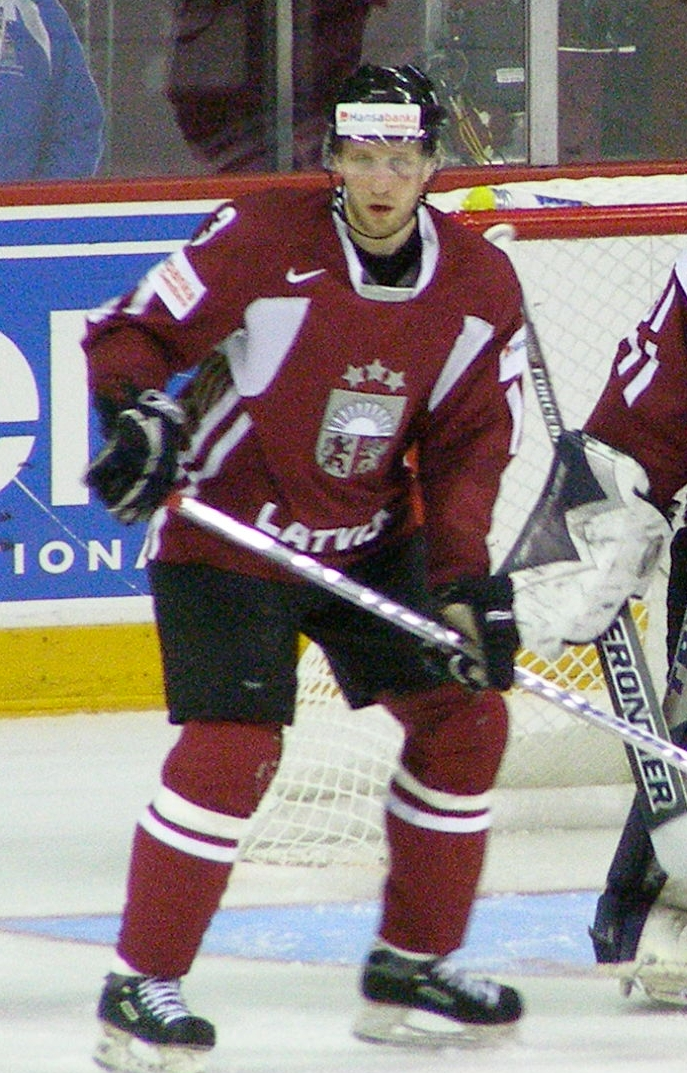
- Born: 1 January 1979 (age 46); Jūrmala, Latvian SSR, Soviet Union
- Height: 5 ft 11 in (180 cm)
- Weight: 200 lb (91 kg; 14 st 4 lb)
- Position: Defence
- Shot: Left
- Played for: Worcester IceCats; Augsburger Panther; HK Riga 2000; Grizzly Adams Wolfsburg; Dinamo Riga
- National team: Latvia
- NHL draft: Undrafted
- Playing career: 1996–2019

Arvīds Reķis (born 1 January 1979) is a Latvian former professional ice hockey defenceman who most notably played for the Augsburger Panther in the Deutsche Eishockey Liga (DEL).

== Playing career ==
He began his career playing junior level in North America, firstly in the United States Hockey League for the Dubuque Fighting Saints and then the Ontario Hockey League for the Erie Otters where he spent four seasons. In 2000, he joined the Indianapolis Ice of the Central Hockey League for their playoff campaign in which the Ice went on to win the Ray Miron President's Cup. He signed as a free-agent with the St. Louis Blues and was assigned to the ECHL for the Peoria Rivermen and also had a spell in the American Hockey League with the Worcester IceCats. He moved to the DEL in 2003 and remained there until the end of season 2009-10.

Rekis played ten seasons throughout his career with Augsburger Panther, retiring following the 2018–19 season, as the oldest participant in the DEL at age 40, on 26 April 2019.

== International play ==
He has also represented the Latvia national ice hockey team in numerous Ice Hockey World Championships and the 2006, 2010 and 2014 Winter Olympics.

== Career statistics ==
=== Regular season and playoffs ===
			Regular season					Playoffs
Season	Team	League	GP	G	A	Pts	PIM	GP	G	A	Pts	PIM
1995–96	Dubuque Fighting Saints	USHL	35	3	3	6	85	—	—	—	—	—
1995–96	Essamika Ogre	LAT	1	0	0	0	2	—	—	—	—	—
1996–97	Erie Otters	OHL	65	5	19	24	101	5	1	2	3	2
1997–98	Erie Otters	OHL	60	9	36	45	77	7	1	2	3	2
1998–99	Erie Otters	OHL	60	5	29	34	66	5	1	1	2	0
1999–2000	Erie Otters	OHL	57	6	29	35	93	13	1	4	5	17
1999–2000	Indianapolis Ice	CHL	—	—	—	—	—	4	0	0	0	0
2000–01	Peoria Rivermen	ECHL	64	12	21	33	99	14	6	3	9	22
2001–02	Peoria Rivermen	ECHL	43	10	17	27	32	—	—	—	—	—
2001–02	Worcester IceCats	AHL	18	0	3	3	8	3	0	0	0	0
2002–03	Peoria Rivermen	ECHL	57	4	19	23	56	4	0	2	2	2
2003–04	Augsburger Panther	DEL	46	5	15	20	81	—	—	—	—	—
2004–05	Augsburger Panther	DEL	46	5	10	15	44	4	0	1	1	6
2005–06	Augsburger Panther	DEL	51	5	10	15	52	—	—	—	—	—
2005–06	HK Rīga 2000	BLR	—	—	—	—	—	5	0	0	0	8
2006–07	Augsburger Panther	DEL	36	3	7	10	62	—	—	—	—	—
2007–08	Augsburger Panther	DEL	54	5	10	15	88	—	—	—	—	—
2008–09	Grizzly Adams Wolfsburg	DEL	50	11	12	23	106	6	3	2	5	6
2009–10	Grizzly Adams Wolfsburg	DEL	53	0	11	11	62	7	0	1	1	6
2010–11	Dinamo Rīga	KHL	51	2	4	6	57	—	—	—	—	—
2011–12	Dinamo Rīga	KHL	39	0	3	3	28	6	0	1	1	6
2012–13	Dinamo Rīga	KHL	39	1	4	5	22	—	—	—	—	—
2013–14	Dinamo Rīga	KHL	43	0	2	2	63	—	—	—	—	—
2014–15	Augsburger Panther	DEL	41	1	5	6	50	—	—	—	—	—
2015–16	Augsburger Panther	DEL	45	2	7	9	54	—	—	—	—	—
2016–17	Augsburger Panther	DEL	43	5	4	9	20	7	0	1	1	0
2017–18	Augsburger Panther	DEL	46	1	4	5	30	—	—	—	—	—
2018–19	Augsburger Panther	DEL	33	1	8	9	28	9	0	0	0	6
ECHL totals			164	26	57	83	187	18	6	5	11	24
DEL totals			543	44	103	147	677	33	3	5	8	24
KHL totals			172	3	13	16	170	6	0	1	1	6

=== International ===
Year	Team	Event	GP	G	A	Pts	PIM
1995	Latvia	EJC C1	5	3	1	4	8
1996	Latvia	EJC C	3	0	0	0	6
1999	Latvia	WJC B	6	2	2	4	8
2003	Latvia	WC	6	0	0	0	4
2004	Latvia	WC	7	1	1	2	12
2005	Latvia	OGQ	3	0	0	0	0
2006	Latvia	OG	5	0	0	0	6
2006	Latvia	WC	6	1	0	1	4
2007	Latvia	WC	4	0	0	0	2
2008	Latvia	WC	6	0	0	0	10
2009	Latvia	OGQ	3	1	2	3	8
2010	Latvia	OG	4	0	0	0	10
2010	Latvia	WC	6	1	0	1	2
2011	Latvia	WC	6	0	2	2	10
2013	Latvia	OGQ	3	0	1	1	2
2014	Latvia	OG	5	0	0	0	4
2016	Latvia	OGQ	3	0	0	0	4
Junior totals			14	5	3	8	22
Senior totals			67	4	6	10	78
