= Oliver Setzinger =

Austrian professional ice hockey forward (born 1983)

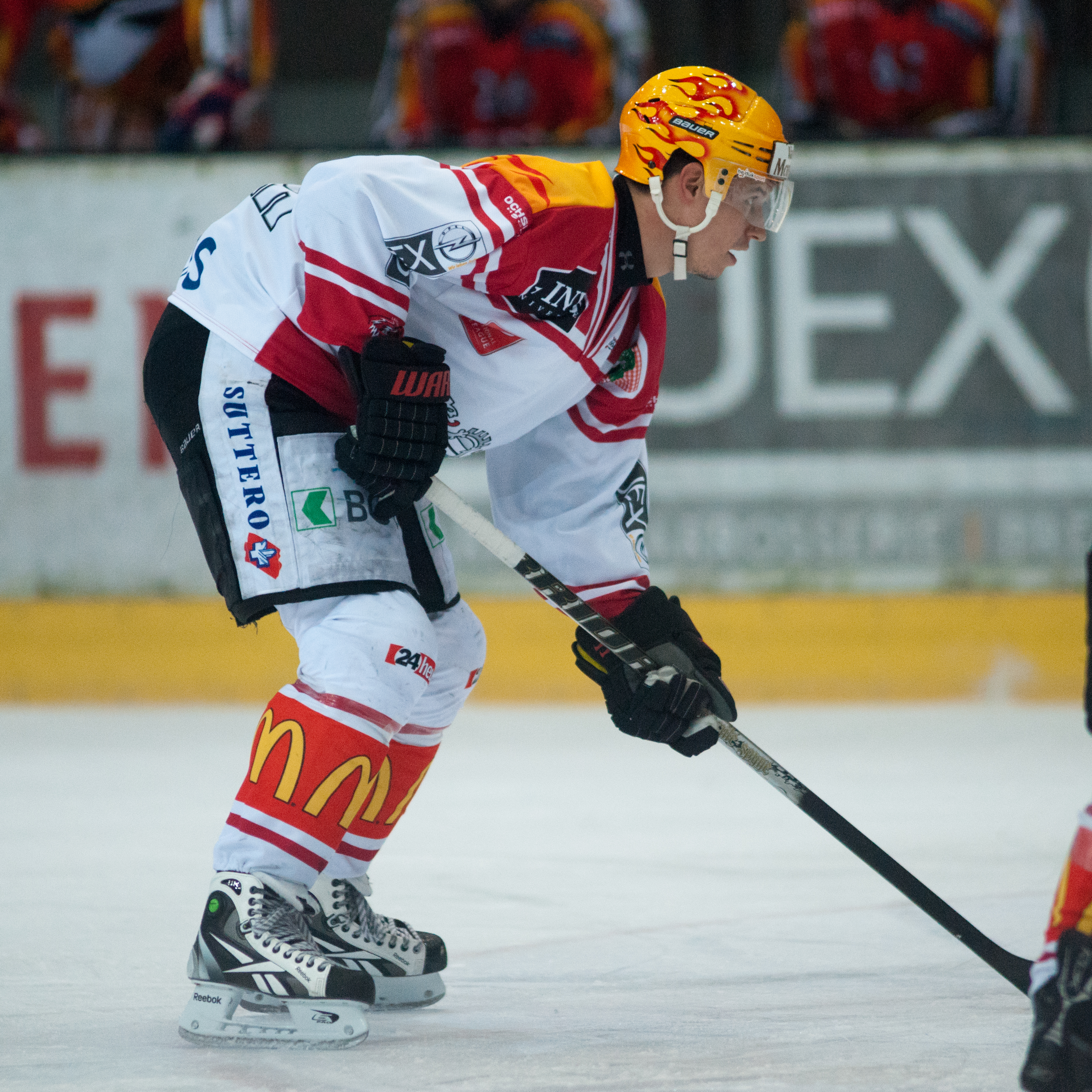
- Born: July 11, 1983 (age 42) Horn, Austria
- Height: 6 ft 0 in (183 cm)
- Weight: 196 lb (89 kg; 14 st 0 lb)
- Position: Centre
- Shoots: Left
- AUT.4 team Former teams: EC Weiz; Ilves Tampere; EHC Black Wings Linz; Lahti Pelicans; Vienna Capitals; HPK; Milwaukee Admirals; SCL Tigers; HC Davos; Lausanne HC; Genève-Servette HC; CSM Dunărea Galați; EC KAC; Graz99ers
- National team: Austria
- NHL draft: 76th overall, 2001; Nashville Predators
- Playing career: 1999–present

Oliver Setzinger (born July 11, 1983) is an Austrian professional ice hockey forward currently playing for EC Weiz of the fourth tier Austrian League.

== Playing career ==
Setzinger was selected by the Nashville Predators in the 3rd round (76th overall) of the 2001 NHL entry draft. After a short-lived experience in the AHL, he moved to Switzerland in 2007, where he played with HC Davos and SC Langnau Tigers in the Swiss National League A before signing a one-year contract with an option for two more seasons with Lausanne HC in National League B in 2010.

He extended with Lausanne to a new three-year contract in December 2010. LHC and Setzinger went on to win the National League B title and to get promoted in April 2013, upsetting Langnau in the promotion-relegation game, after many unfruitful attempts including 2 promotion-relegation games lost to EHC Biel over 8 years spent playing in second division. In the 2013–14 season, he tallied 34 points in 50 games and contributed to LHC clinching a playoff spot in the Swiss elite league for the first time in the club's history.

On July 11, 2014, Setzinger moved in a return to the Austrian Hockey League, signing with EC KAC of the EBEL.

After two successful seasons in Klagenfurt, Setzinger left as a free agent in agreeing to a three-year deal with fellow Austrian club, Graz 99ers, on July 4, 2016.

== International play ==
Setzinger took part in the 2001, 2002, 2003, 2004, 2005, 2007, 2009 and 2011 IIHF World Championship as a member of the Austria men's national ice hockey team as well as the 2002 and 2014 Winter Olympics in Salt Lake City and Sochi.

== Career statistics ==
=== Regular season and playoffs ===
			Regular season					Playoffs
Season	Team	League	GP	G	A	Pts	PIM	GP	G	A	Pts	PIM
1999–2000	Ilves	FIN U18	18	16	9	25	38	—	—	—	—	—
1999–2000	Ilves	FIN U20	35	6	5	11	65	—	—	—	—	—
1999–2000	Ilves	SM-liiga	1	0	0	0	2	—	—	—	—	—
2000–01	Ilves	FIN U20	31	8	12	20	74	—	—	—	—	—
2000–01	Ilves	SM-liiga	14	0	1	1	10	—	—	—	—	—
2001–02	Ilves	FIN U20	1	0	0	0	2	—	—	—	—	—
2001–02	Ilves	SM-liiga	10	1	0	1	4	—	—	—	—	—
2001–02	Sport	Mestis	8	5	2	7	6	—	—	—	—	—
2001–02	Black Wings Linz	EBEL	9	6	7	13	10	13	4	14	18	8
2002–03	Pelicans	SM-liiga	56	7	14	21	54	—	—	—	—	—
2002–03	Vienna Capitals	EBEL	—	—	—	—	—	2	1	0	1	2
2003–04	Pelicans	SM-liiga	20	2	4	6	22	—	—	—	—	—
2003–04	KalPa	Mestis	8	4	7	11	20	—	—	—	—	—
2003–04	HPK	SM-liiga	14	6	3	9	10	8	4	2	6	4
2004–05	HPK	SM-liiga	53	11	17	28	67	10	0	1	1	2
2005–06	Vienna Capitals	EBEL	45	32	38	70	98	5	4	2	6	8
2006–07	Vienna Capitals	EBEL	56	26	50	76	62	3	2	4	6	16
2007–08	Milwaukee Admirals	AHL	21	1	2	3	12	—	—	—	—	—
2007–08	SC Langnau	NLA	5	1	2	3	4	—	—	—	—	—
2008–09	SC Langnau	NLA	46	10	36	46	79	—	—	—	—	—
2009–10	SCL Tigers	NLA	19	5	13	18	8	—	—	—	—	—
2009–10	HC Davos	NLA	30	11	9	20	10	5	1	4	5	6
2010–11	Lausanne HC	NLB	44	18	48	66	28	17	6	10	16	35
2010–11	Genève–Servette HC	NLA	2	1	0	1	0	—	—	—	—	—
2011–12	Lausanne HC	NLB	45	26	32	58	36	15	13	8	21	10
2012–13	Lausanne HC	NLB	33	17	33	50	26	—	—	—	—	—
2013–14	Lausanne HC	NLA	50	9	25	34	40	6	1	1	2	8
2014–15	CSM Dunărea Galați	ROM	1	0	2	2	2	—	—	—	—	—
2014–15	EC KAC	EBEL	39	12	17	29	23	9	5	4	9	6
2015–16	EC KAC	EBEL	53	16	35	51	55	7	2	4	6	12
2016–17	Graz 99ers	EBEL	53	20	41	61	48	5	3	0	3	4
2017–18	Graz 99ers	EBEL	53	14	21	35	28	—	—	—	—	—
2018–19	Graz 99ers	EBEL	51	6	40	46	63	10	2	5	7	8
2019–20	Graz 99ers	EBEL	37	6	17	23	28	3	0	3	3	2
2020–21	Graz99ers	ICEHL	48	8	21	29	28	—	—	—	—	—
2021–22	EC Weiz	AUT.4	13	7	17	24	37	6	4	4	8	4
2021–22	EV Zeltweg	AUT.3	4	3	8	11	2	—	—	—	—	—
SM-liiga totals			168	27	39	66	169	18	4	3	7	6
AUT totals			435	140	280	420	433	42	18	22	40	56
NLA totals			152	37	85	122	141	5	1	4	5	6

=== International ===
Year	Team	Event	GP	G	A	Pts	PIM
1999	Austria	WJC18 B	5	5	4	9	0
2000	Austria	WJC C	4	1	0	1	18
2000	Austria	WJC18 B	5	7	6	13	0
2001	Austria	WJC D1	5	5	2	7	10
2001	Austria	OGQ	3	1	0	1	0
2001	Austria	WJC18 D1	5	5	3	8	10
2001	Austria	WC	6	0	0	0	0
2002	Austria	WJC D1	5	2	4	6	8
2002	Austria	OG	4	1	0	1	2
2002	Austria	WC	6	2	1	3	2
2003	Austria	WJC D1	5	6	9	15	12
2003	Austria	WC	6	0	1	1	2
2004	Austria	WC	6	1	2	3	10
2005	Austria	OGQ	3	1	1	2	27
2005	Austria	WC	6	1	1	2	2
2006	Austria	WC D1	5	1	4	5	6
2007	Austria	WC	6	1	3	4	0
2008	Austria	WC D1	5	3	8	11	0
2009	Austria	OGQ	3	0	3	3	4
2009	Austria	WC	6	2	1	3	6
2010	Austria	WC D1	5	1	9	10	0
2011	Austria	WC	6	1	0	1	2
2014	Austria	OG	2	0	1	1	0
Junior totals			34	31	28	59	58
Senior totals			78	16	35	51	63
