= Thomas Raffl =

Austrian ice hockey player

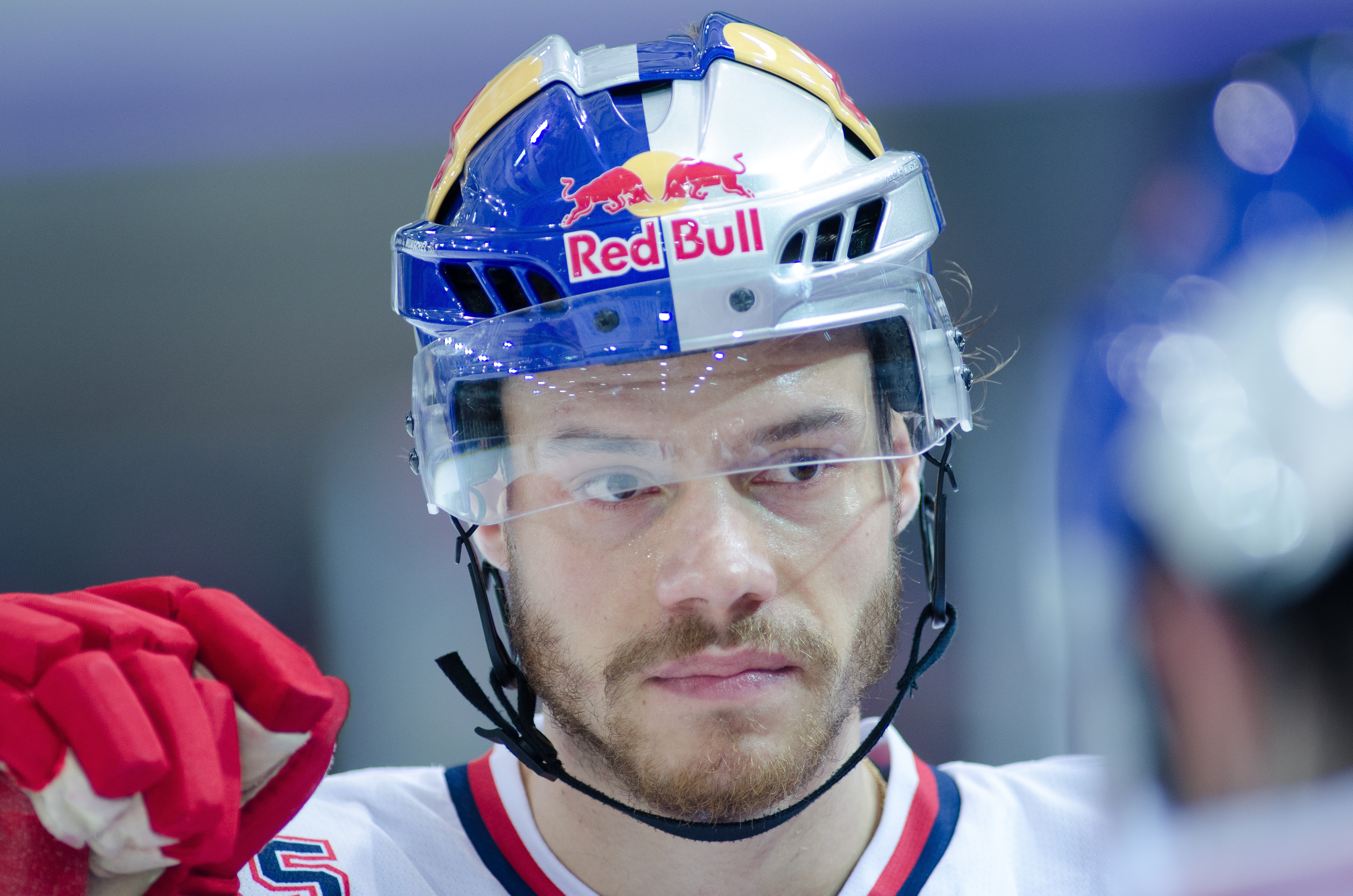
- Born: 19 June 1986 (age 40) Villach, Austria
- Height: 6 ft 4 in (193 cm)
- Weight: 234 lb (106 kg; 16 st 10 lb)
- Position: Left wing
- Shoots: Left
- ICEHL team Former teams: EC Red Bull Salzburg; EC VSV; Luleå HF; Manitoba Moose
- National team: Austria
- NHL draft: Undrafted
- Playing career: 2004–present

Thomas Raffl (born 19 June 1986) is an Austrian professional ice hockey winger who is currently playing with EC Red Bull Salzburg of the ICE Hockey League (ICEHL). He previously played for Luleå HF of the Swedish Hockey League. He is the older brother of NHL player Michael Raffl. His father Peter Raffl also played ice hockey.

== Playing career ==
Raffl briefly played major junior hockey in Canada with the Kelowna Rockets and Swift Current Broncos of the Western Hockey League during the 2005–06 season.

Since 2007, Raffl has been a fixture participant with the Austrian national team, including at the 2015 IIHF World Championship. In the lead up to the 2015–16 season, Raffl was granted leave by Salzburg on 1 September 2015, to attend the preseason training camp of the NHL's Winnipeg Jets on a professional tryout contract. Following the training camp, Raffl signed a one-year, one-way contract with the Jets and was assigned to the Manitoba Moose, the Jets' American Hockey League affiliate.

During the 2015–16 season with the Moose, Raffl was unable to maintain his offensive presence, producing just 5 goals in 31 games. Unable to earn a recall to the NHL, at the conclusion of the season, Raffl was not tendered a contract by the Jets and was released to free agency. On 11 July 2016, Raffl returned to Salzburg of the EBEL, signing a one-year deal.

== Career statistics ==
=== Regular season and playoffs ===
| | | | Regular season | | | | | Playoffs |
| Season | Team | League | GP | G | A | Pts | PIM | GP | G | A | Pts | PIM |
|---|---|---|---|---|---|---|---|---|---|---|---|---|
| 2001–02 | EC VSV | AUT U20 | 10 | 2 | 2 | 4 | 10 | — | — | — | — | — |
| 2002–03 | EC VSV | AUT U20 | 30 | 16 | 16 | 32 | 54 | — | — | — | — | — |
| 2003–04 | EC VSV | AUT U20 | 23 | 12 | 11 | 23 | 65 | — | — | — | — | — |
| 2003–04 | EC VSV | EBEL | 25 | 1 | 1 | 2 | 4 | 4 | 0 | 0 | 0 | 0 |
| 2004–05 | EC VSV | AUT U20 | 7 | 2 | 3 | 5 | 24 | — | — | — | — | — |
| 2004–05 | EC VSV | EBEL | 44 | 7 | 12 | 19 | 49 | 3 | 0 | 0 | 0 | 0 |
| 2005–06 | Des Moines Buccaneers | USHL | 4 | 0 | 0 | 0 | 7 | — | — | — | — | — |
| 2005–06 | Kelowna Rockets | WHL | 12 | 2 | 1 | 3 | 11 | — | — | — | — | — |
| 2005–06 | Swift Current Broncos | WHL | 21 | 2 | 6 | 8 | 28 | — | — | — | — | — |
| 2005–06 | EC VSV | AUT U20 | 3 | 1 | 3 | 4 | 0 | — | — | — | — | — |
| 2005–06 | EC VSV | EBEL | 6 | 0 | 2 | 2 | 2 | 13 | 0 | 0 | 0 | 2 |
| 2006–07 | EC VSV | EBEL | 42 | 8 | 5 | 13 | 36 | 8 | 0 | 0 | 0 | 0 |
| 2007–08 | EC VSV | EBEL | 43 | 11 | 4 | 15 | 78 | 5 | 0 | 2 | 2 | 0 |
| 2008–09 | EC VSV | EBEL | 41 | 23 | 12 | 35 | 57 | — | — | — | — | — |
| 2009–10 | Luleå HF | SEL | 45 | 7 | 8 | 15 | 24 | — | — | — | — | — |
| 2010–11 | Luleå HF | SEL | 22 | 1 | 1 | 2 | 10 | — | — | — | — | — |
| 2010–11 | EC Red Bull Salzburg | EBEL | 25 | 5 | 7 | 12 | 51 | 16 | 4 | 8 | 12 | 12 |
| 2011–12 | EC Red Bull Salzburg | EBEL | 50 | 12 | 42 | 54 | 16 | 6 | 5 | 0 | 5 | 2 |
| 2012–13 | EC Red Bull Salzburg | EBEL | 28 | 5 | 16 | 21 | 16 | 11 | 4 | 1 | 5 | 2 |
| 2013–14 | EC Red Bull Salzburg | EBEL | 51 | 23 | 22 | 45 | 47 | 14 | 6 | 4 | 10 | 9 |
| 2014–15 | EC Red Bull Salzburg | EBEL | 52 | 26 | 27 | 53 | 20 | 13 | 5 | 4 | 9 | 8 |
| 2015–16 | EC Red Bull Salzburg | EBEL | 1 | 1 | 1 | 2 | 2 | — | — | — | — | — |
| 2015–16 | Manitoba Moose | AHL | 31 | 5 | 5 | 10 | 42 | — | — | — | — | — |
| 2016–17 | EC Red Bull Salzburg | EBEL | 53 | 26 | 24 | 50 | 22 | 11 | 5 | 5 | 10 | 2 |
| 2017–18 | EC Red Bull Salzburg | EBEL | 42 | 18 | 27 | 45 | 18 | 16 | 3 | 4 | 7 | 4 |
| 2018–19 | EC Red Bull Salzburg | EBEL | 43 | 18 | 26 | 44 | 26 | 13 | 4 | 7 | 11 | 4 |
| 2019–20 | EC Red Bull Salzburg | EBEL | 31 | 21 | 15 | 36 | 12 | 3 | 1 | 1 | 2 | 0 |
| 2020–21 | EC Red Bull Salzburg | ICEHL | 45 | 21 | 17 | 38 | 17 | 9 | 1 | 1 | 2 | 4 |
| 2021–22 | EC Red Bull Salzburg | ICEHL | 38 | 16 | 17 | 33 | 27 | 12 | 5 | 8 | 13 | 4 |
| 2022–23 | EC Red Bull Salzburg | ICEHL | 31 | 6 | 12 | 18 | 14 | 13 | 4 | 5 | 9 | 4 |
| 2023–24 | EC Red Bull Salzburg | ICEHL | 41 | 17 | 19 | 36 | 19 | 19 | 11 | 8 | 19 | 6 |
| 2024–25 | EC Red Bull Salzburg | ICEHL | 32 | 12 | 10 | 22 | 11 | 13 | 4 | 3 | 7 | 4 |
| ICEHL totals | | | 764 | 277 | 318 | 595 | 544 | 189 | 58 | 58 | 116 | 63 |
| SEL totals | | | 67 | 8 | 9 | 17 | 34 | – | – | – | – | – |

=== International ===
| Year | Team | Event | Result | GP | G | A | Pts | PIM |
|---|---|---|---|---|---|---|---|---|
| 2004 | Austria | WJC18 D1 | 15th | 5 | 0 | 2 | 2 | 2 |
| 2005 | Austria | WJC D1 | 17th | 5 | 1 | 0 | 1 | 2 |
| 2006 | Austria | WJC D1 | 20th | 4 | 1 | 1 | 2 | 6 |
| 2008 | Austria | WC D1 | 17th | 5 | 1 | 2 | 3 | 0 |
| 2010 | Austria | WC D1 | 17th | 5 | 1 | 1 | 2 | 18 |
| 2011 | Austria | WC | 15th | 6 | 2 | 2 | 4 | 2 |
| 2012 | Austria | WC D1A | 18th | 5 | 1 | 2 | 3 | 2 |
| 2013 | Austria | OGQ | Q | 3 | 1 | 2 | 3 | 0 |
| 2014 | Austria | OG | 10th | 4 | 0 | 0 | 0 | 2 |
| 2015 | Austria | WC | 15th | 7 | 2 | 1 | 3 | 2 |
| 2016 | Austria | OGQ | DNQ | 3 | 1 | 0 | 1 | 2 |
| 2017 | Austria | WC D1A | 17th | 4 | 3 | 3 | 6 | 2 |
| 2019 | Austria | WC | 16th | 7 | 0 | 0 | 0 | 10 |
| 2021 | Austria | OGQ | DNQ | 3 | 0 | 0 | 0 | 6 |
| 2022 | Austria | WC | 11th | 6 | 2 | 3 | 5 | 4 |
| 2023 | Austria | WC | 14th | 6 | 3 | 0 | 3 | 4 |
| 2024 | Austria | WC | 10th | 6 | 0 | 2 | 2 | 4 |
| 2025 | Austria | WC | 8th | 7 | 1 | 1 | 2 | 2 |
| Junior totals | | | | 14 | 2 | 3 | 5 | 10 |
| Senior totals | | | | 77 | 18 | 19 | 37 | 60 |
