= Michael Raffl =

Austrian ice hockey player (born 1988)

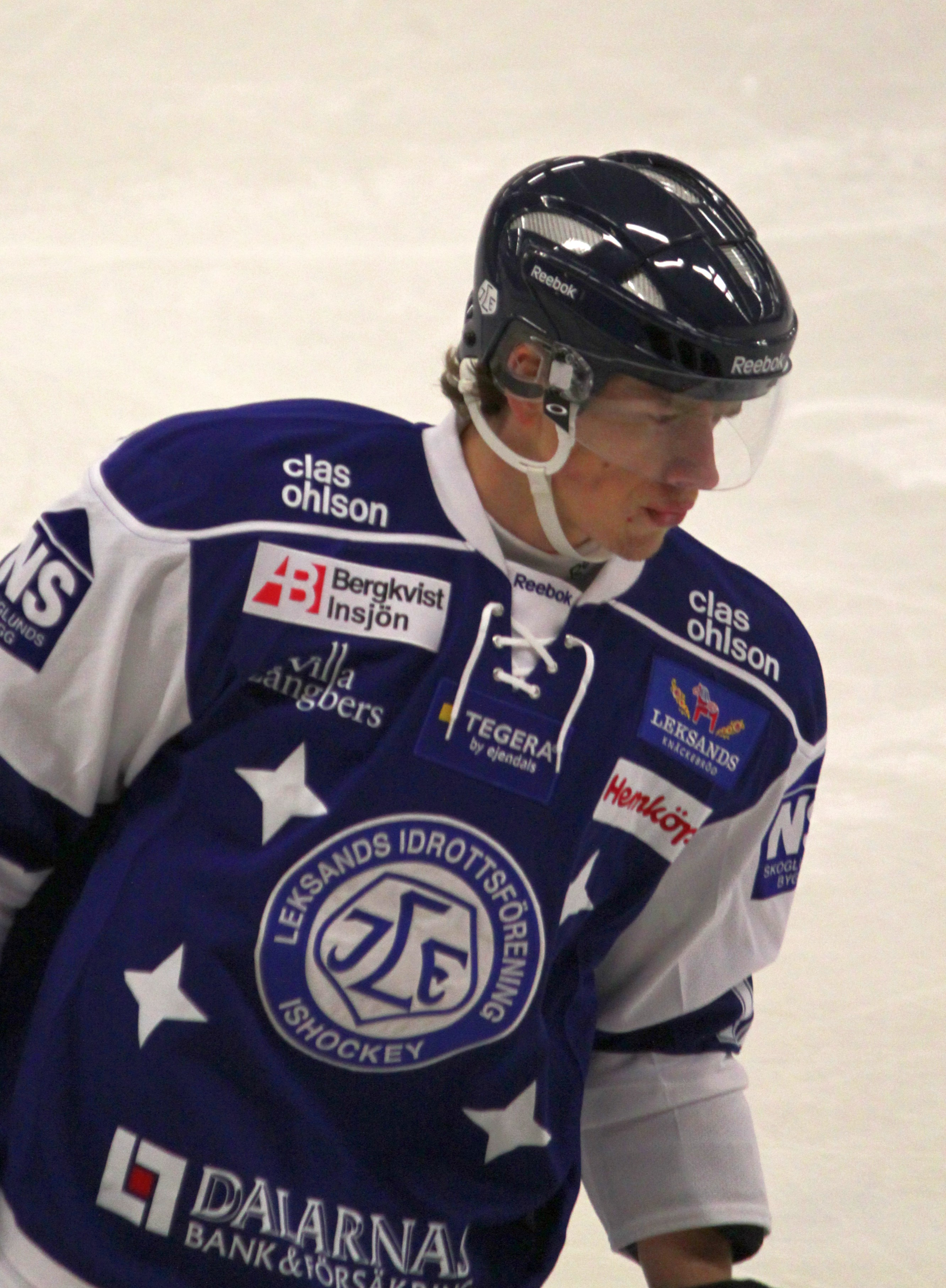
- Raffl with Leksands IF in 2011
- Born: 1 December 1988 (age 37) Villach, Austria
- Height: 6 ft 1 in (185 cm)
- Weight: 200 lb (91 kg; 14 st 4 lb)
- Position: Left wing
- Shoots: Left
- ICEHL team Former teams: EC Red Bull Salzburg; EC VSV; Philadelphia Flyers; Washington Capitals; Dallas Stars; Lausanne HC
- National team: Austria
- NHL draft: Undrafted
- Playing career: 2006–present

Michael Raffl (born 1 December 1988) is an Austrian professional ice hockey left winger with EC Red Bull Salzburg of the ICE Hockey League (ICEHL). He previously played in the National Hockey League (NHL) for the Philadelphia Flyers, Washington Capitals and Dallas Stars, as well as in the Austrian ICE Hockey League (IceHL) with EC VSV and in the Swiss National League (NL) with Lausanne HC.

== Early life ==
Raffl was born on 1 December 1988 in Villach, Austria, to a hockey-playing family. His father Peter played with the Villacher SV (EC VSV) for 22 years, and served as head coach of the town's under-20 ice hockey team. Raffl and his older brother Thomas spent most of their childhood in the Villacher Stadthalle arena. Raffl said that it was "pretty popular to play hockey" in Villach, "but it wasn't professional", and it was difficult for players to head overseas and play in the National Hockey League (NHL). Growing up, he was close friends with future NHL player Michael Grabner, who lived "a two-minute walk" away from the Raffls.

== Playing career ==
As a youth, Raffl played in the 2002 Quebec International Pee-Wee Hockey Tournament with a team from Austria.

=== NHL ===
==== Philadelphia Flyers ====
On 31 May 2013 Raffl signed a one-year, entry-level contract with the Philadelphia Flyers. He began the 2013–14 season with the Flyers AHL affiliate, the Adirondack Phantoms. He was recalled to the NHL on 12 October, and he scored his first career NHL goal on 9 December 2013, against Craig Anderson of the Ottawa Senators.

Raffl signed a two-year contract extension with the Flyers worth $2.2 million on 22 March 2014. Through the second year of his contract with the Flyers in the 2015–16 season, Raffl was signed remain with the organization in agreeing to a three-year deal on February 29, 2016.

Raffl's 2016–17 season was riddled with injuries and he only appeared in a career-low 52 games that season. In October 2016, Raffl was placed on injured reserve to recover from an upper-body injury. In March 2017, Raffl was injured in a game against the Colorado Avalanche and was set to be out for 6–8 weeks.

Raffl signed a two-year contract extension with the Flyers on March 26, 2019.

On 3 December 2019, Raffl suffered a broken finger in a 6–1 game against the Toronto Maple Leafs. He was ruled out for approximately four weeks.

On November 28, 2020, Raffl was loaned by the Flyers to Villacher SV in the ICE Hockey League until the commencement of the delayed 2020–21 North American season. He played four games there before he was recalled to the Flyers.

==== Washington Capitals ====
At the NHL trade deadline on April 12, 2021, the Flyers traded Raffl to the Washington Capitals in exchange for a fifth-round draft pick. His debut with the team was delayed after suffering an upper-body injury with the Flyers, and he began practicing with the team on April 21. Raffl made his team debut the following day, replacing Daniel Sprong in a 1–0 shootout victory against the New York Islanders.

==== Dallas Stars ====
On July 29, 2021, the Dallas Stars signed Raffl to a one-year, $1.1 million contract. In the 2021–22 season, Raffl established himself within the Stars checking-line, making 76 regular season appearance in collecting 7 goals and 16 points. He added 2 goals and 3 points in the playoffs, exiting in a game 7 defeat to the Calgary Flames in the first-round.

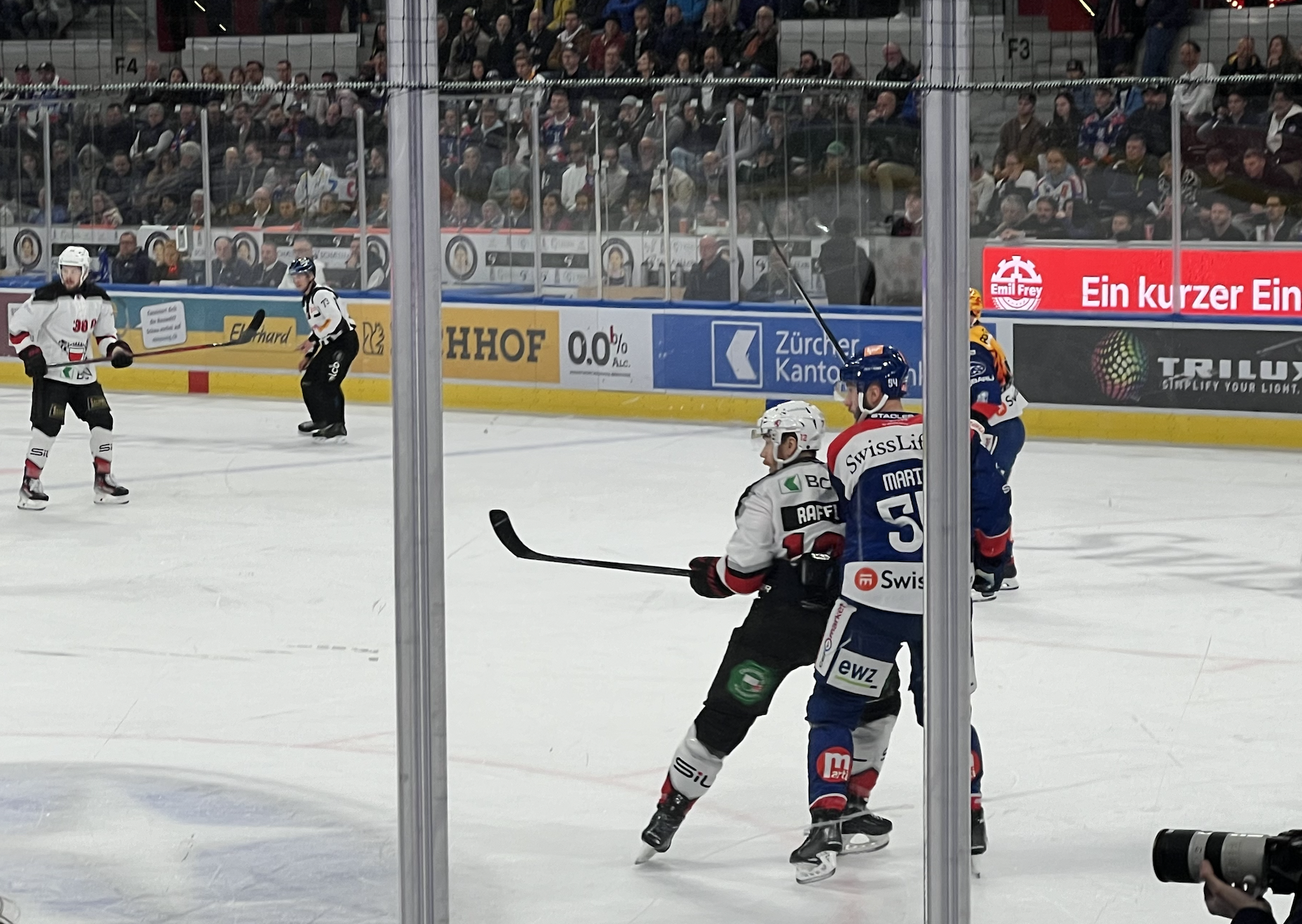
Raffl (center, in white) playing with Lausanne in the 2024 National League Final against Zurich.

=== Return to Europe ===
Unable to agree on a contract extension with the Stars, Raffl left as a free agent and returned to Europe in agreeing to a two-year contract with Swiss club, Lausanne HC of the National League on 4 August 2022.

Following three injury-plagued seasons with Lausanne, including two as captain, Raffl opted to depart the club following the 2024–25 season.

== International play ==
Raffl participated at the 2009 and 2011 IIHF World Championship as a member of the Austria men's national ice hockey team, and was also named to team Austria for the 2014 Winter Olympics.

== Personal life ==
Raffl's father, Peter, is a former player who spent the entirety of his career in Austria. His brother Thomas currently plays for EC Red Bull Salzburg of EBEL. Raffl is close friends with Flyers' teammate Scott Laughton and assisted Laughton with his proposal to fiancée Chloe.

== Career statistics ==
=== Regular season and playoffs ===
			Regular season					Playoffs
Season	Team	League	GP	G	A	Pts	PIM	GP	G	A	Pts	PIM
2004–05	EC VSV	AUT U20	12	5	5	10	4	—	—	—	—	—
2005–06	EC VSV	AUT U20	26	11	27	38	91	—	—	—	—	—
2005–06	EC VSV	EBEL	5	0	0	0	0	3	0	0	0	0
2006–07	EC VSV	AUT U20	21	23	24	47	82	—	—	—	—	—
2006–07	EC VSV	EBEL	43	4	2	6	22	4	0	0	0	0
2007–08	EC VSV	AUT U20	6	5	7	12	28	4	6	6	12	10
2007–08	EC VSV	EBEL	40	3	6	9	24	5	2	0	2	0
2008–09	EC VSV	EBEL	49	9	10	19	77	6	0	2	2	12
2009–10	EC VSV	EBEL	42	25	18	43	54	5	1	0	1	14
2010–11	EC VSV	EBEL	50	26	29	55	62	8	5	4	9	20
2011–12	Leksands IF	Allsv	39	10	13	23	26	6	0	1	1	0
2012–13	Leksands IF	Allsv	49	24	22	46	40	10	3	3	6	4
2013–14	Adirondack Phantoms	AHL	2	1	2	3	0	—	—	—	—	—
2013–14	Philadelphia Flyers	NHL	68	9	13	22	28	7	0	1	1	0
2014–15	Philadelphia Flyers	NHL	67	21	7	28	34	—	—	—	—	—
2015–16	Philadelphia Flyers	NHL	82	13	18	31	30	6	1	0	1	2
2016–17	Philadelphia Flyers	NHL	52	8	3	11	20	—	—	—	—	—
2017–18	Philadelphia Flyers	NHL	76	13	9	22	28	6	0	1	1	2
2018–19	Philadelphia Flyers	NHL	67	6	12	18	32	—	—	—	—	—
2019–20	Philadelphia Flyers	NHL	58	8	12	20	14	9	4	1	5	2
2020–21	EC VSV	ICEHL	4	1	2	3	6	—	—	—	—	—
2020–21	Philadelphia Flyers	NHL	34	3	5	8	26	—	—	—	—	—
2020–21	Washington Capitals	NHL	10	1	2	3	7	4	0	0	0	4
2021–22	Dallas Stars	NHL	76	7	9	16	16	7	2	1	3	19
2022–23	Lausanne HC	NL	25	8	6	14	14	—	—	—	—	—
2023–24	Lausanne HC	NL	14	6	6	12	8	19	6	4	10	18
2024–25	Lausanne HC	NL	16	5	9	14	6	10	1	2	2	20
EBEL totals			233	68	67	135	245	31	8	6	14	48
NHL totals			590	89	90	179	235	39	7	4	11	29
NL totals			55	19	21	40	28	29	7	5	12	38

=== International ===
Year	Team	Event	Result	GP	G	A	Pts	PIM
2006	Austria	U18 D1	19th	5	0	1	1	8
2007	Austria	WJC D1	15th	5	1	2	3	8
2008	Austria	WJC D1	12th	5	5	8	13	0
2009	Austria	OGQ	DNQ	3	0	1	1	2
2009	Austria	WC	14th	2	0	0	0	0
2011	Austria	WC	15th	3	0	1	1	0
2013	Austria	OGQ	Q	3	1	1	2	2
2013	Austria	WC	15th	7	2	1	3	0
2014	Austria	OG	10th	4	1	2	3	4
2015	Austria	WC	15th	7	1	2	3	6
2016	Austria	OGQ	DNQ	3	0	1	1	2
2018	Austria	WC	14th	5	4	1	5	4
2019	Austria	WC	16th	6	4	0	4	4
Junior totals				15	6	11	17	16
Senior totals				43	13	10	23	24
