= 1999–2000 OB I bajnoksag season =

Hungarian ice hockey season

The 1999–2000 OB I bajnokság season was the 63rd season of the OB I bajnokság, the top level of ice hockey in Hungary. Seven teams participated in the league, and Dunaferr SE Dunaujvaros won the championship.

== First round ==
	Club	GP	W	T	L	Goals	Pts
1.	Dunaferr SE Dunaújváros	12	10	2	0	108:14	22
2.	Ferencvárosi TC	12	9	1	2	103:35	19
3.	Alba Volán Székesfehérvár	12	8	3	1	102:29	19
4.	Gyor HC	12	6	0	6	52:73	12
5.	Tisza Volan HC Szeged	12	3	0	9	43:85	6
6.	MAC. N. Budapest	12	2	0	10	31:80	4
7.	Miskolc JJE	12	1	0	11	30:153	2

== Second round ==
=== Group A ===
	Club	GP	W	T	L	Goals	Pts
1.	Dunaferr SE Dunaújváros	12	7	3	2	50:31	17
2.	Ferencvárosi TC	12	5	2	5	42:45	12
3.	Alba Volán Székesfehérvár	12	1	5	6	41:57	7

=== Group B ===
	Club	GP	W	T	L	Goals	Pts
4.	Gyor HC	12	10	0	2	84:36	20
5.	Tisza Volan HC Szeged	12	8	0	4	75:51	16
6.	MAC. N. Budapest	12	3	0	9	46:66	6
7.	Miskolc JJE	12	3	0	9	36:88	6

== Playoffs ==
=== 3rd place ===
- Gyor HC - Alba Volán Székesfehérvár 4:13

=== Final ===
- Dunaferr SE Dunaújváros - Ferencvárosi TC 4:0 (5:0, 3:2, 5:3, 4:1)
