= Gerd Gruber =

Austrian ice hockey player

- Born: April 27, 1982 (age 42); Graz, AUT
- Height: 6 ft 2 in (188 cm)
- Weight: 196 lb (89 kg; 14 st 0 lb)
- Position: Defence
- EBEL team Former teams: EHC Black Wings Linz; Graz 99ers Vienna Capitals
- Playing career: 1999–present

Gerd Gruber (born April 27, 1982 in Graz) is an Austrian ice hockey defenceman currently playing for EHC Black Wings Linz in the Erste Bank Hockey League.

Gruber began his career in 1998, playing for his hometown team. He spent a total of seven seasons with the Graz 99ers before moving to the Vienna Capitals in 2005. He signed for Linz in 2006.
