= Bence Svasznek =

Hungarian ice hockey player (born 1975)

- Born: July 25, 1975 (age 50) Budapest, Hungary
- Height: 6 ft 1 in (185 cm)
- Weight: 203 lb (92 kg; 14 st 7 lb)
- Position: Defence
- Shot: Left
- Played for: Ujpesti TE; Ferencvarosi TC; Alba Volan Szekesfehervar; Budapest Stars; Miskolci Jegesmedvék JSE
- National team: Hungary
- Playing career: 1996–2012

Bence Svasznek (born July 25, 1975) is a Hungarian former professional ice hockey player.

Svasznek represented Hungary in the 2009 IIHF World Championship.

== Career statistics ==
=== Austrian Hockey League ===
	Seasons	GP	Goals	Assists	Pts	PIM
Regular season	1	42	1	0	1	24
Playoffs	–	–	–	–	–	–
