= Rafael Kadyrov =

Russian ice hockey referee

Rafael Razimovich Kadyrov (Russian: Рафаэль Разимович Кадыров; April 4, 1969 – January 19, 2017) was a Russian ice hockey referee.

Chief Justice of the Russian Higher Hockey League from season 1998/99. September 8, 2016, Kadyrov played his 700th match in the championships of Russia, becoming the second hockey referee, who have achieved this result. In matches KHL worked since the league base.

Rafael Kadyrov served Kontinental Hockey League All-Star Game in 2016, two adult world championships, six youth and junior world championships.

In October 2016 Kadyrov was diagnosed — a brain tumor — astrocytoma of the third degree. He died in January 2017 .

He has been repeatedly recognized as one of the best hockey referees in Russia.
