= Greg Chambers =

British/Canadian ice hockey player (born 1982)

- Born: November 14, 1982 (age 43) Toronto, Ontario, Canada
- Height: 5 ft 11 in (180 cm)
- Weight: 210 lb (95 kg; 15 st 0 lb)
- Position: Right wing
- Shoots: Right
- Eihl team Former teams: Basingstoke Bison; Coventry Blaze, Guildford Flames
- Playing career: 2003–present

Greg Chambers (born November 14, 1982, in Toronto, Ontario) is a British-Canadian ice hockey right winger who played for the Basingstoke Bison.

Chambers played junior hockey in the Ontario Hockey League with the Peterborough Petes where he led the Petes in Scoring before playing one playoff game for the Missouri River Otters of the United Hockey League. He played one season in the ECHL for the Pensacola Ice Pilots before moving to Italy to play for Varese.

Chambers joined Basingstoke in 2005 and became a fan-favourite with the club. In 2007–08, Chambers led the team in goals (39), assists (56) and points (95).

Chambers joined Coventry Blaze in April 2009, after Basingstoke dropped to the English Premier League.
