= Peter Raffl =

Austrian ice hockey player

- Born: 2 February 1960 (age 65); Villach, Austria
- Height: 6 ft 0 in (183 cm)
- Weight: 183 lb (83 kg; 13 st 1 lb)
- Position: Forward
- Shot: Right
- Played for: EC VSV
- National team: Austria
- Playing career: 1977–1998

Peter Raffl (born 2 February 1960) is a former Austrian ice hockey player and coach. He competed in the men's tournaments at the 1984 Winter Olympics and the 1988 Winter Olympics.
