= Alexei Voronov =

Russian ice hockey player (born 1977)

- Born: September 29, 1977 (age 48) Yekaterinburg, Russian SFSR, Soviet Union
- Height: 6 ft 0 in (183 cm)
- Weight: 187 lb (85 kg; 13 st 5 lb)
- Position: Defence
- Shot: Left
- Played for: Dinamo-Energija Yekaterinburg; Avtomobilist Yekaterinburg
- Playing career: 1994–2012; 2014–2018

Alexei Voronov (born September 29, 1977) is a Russian former professional ice hockey defenceman.

== Career ==
Voronov began his career with his hometown team Avtomobilist Yekaterinburg who later became Spartak Yekaterinburg and Dinamo-Energija Yekaterinburg. He played with the team from 1993 to 2003, playing in the Russian Superleague until their relegation to the Vysshaya Liga 2001.

He then moved to Sputnik Nizhny Tagil of the Vysshaya Liga in 2003 and stayed for four seasons before returning to Yekaterinburg in 2007 to join Avtomobilist Yekaterinburg, a new team founded the previous year to replace the former Dinamo-Energija team that folded in 2006. He then spent a season with Yugra Khanty-Mansiysk before returning to Avtomobilist for the 2009–10 KHL season, playing 44 games and scoring six goals and seven assists.

Voronov then spent the next two seasons in the Supreme Hockey League for Sputnik Nizhny Tagil and HC Mechel Chelyabinsk as well as in the Kazakhstan Hockey Championship for Beibarys Atyrau. After two seasons of inactivity, Voronov signed with Hungarian team Debreceni HK of the MOL Liga for one season. He then spent a year with HK Dukla Michalovce of the Slovak 1. Liga before moving to the United Arab Emirates to play for White Bears Dubai in the Emirates Ice Hockey League in 2016. He spent two seasons with the team, after which he retired for the second time in 2018.

== Career statistics ==
			Regular season					Playoffs
Season	Team	League	GP	G	A	Pts	PIM	GP	G	A	Pts	PIM
1993–94	Avtomobilist Yekaterinburg	Russia	5	0	0	0	2	—	—	—	—	—
1993–94	Avtomobilist Yekaterinburg-2	Russia3	11	1	0	1	12	—	—	—	—	—
1994–95	SKA-Avtomobilist Yekaterinburg	Russia2	51	1	1	2	79	—	—	—	—	—
1994–95	Trubnik Kamensk-Uralsky	Russia4	2	0	0	0	2	—	—	—	—	—
1995–96	Avtomobilist Yekaterinburg	Russia	3	0	0	0	2	—	—	—	—	—
1995–96	SKA-Avtomobilist Yekaterinburg-2	Russia2	31	4	1	5	46	—	—	—	—	—
1996–97	Spartak Yekaterinburg	Russia	3	0	0	0	4	—	—	—	—	—
1996–97	SKA Yekaterinburg	Russia3	40	5	9	14	48	—	—	—	—	—
1996–97	RTI Yekaterinburg	Russia4	2	0	0	0	0	3	0	1	1	2
1997–98	Metallurg Serov	Russia2	16	0	3	3	22	—	—	—	—	—
1997–98	Dynamo-Energiya Yekaterinburg	Russia	6	0	0	0	8	—	—	—	—	—
1997–98	Dynamo-Energiya Yekaterinburg-2	Russia3	2	0	0	0	6	—	—	—	—	—
1998–99	Dynamo-Energiya Yekaterinburg	Russia2	22	2	1	3	26	—	—	—	—	—
1998–99	Dynamo-Energiya Yekaterinburg-2	Russia3	18	5	5	10	14	—	—	—	—	—
1999–00	Dynamo-Energiya Yekaterinburg	Russia	19	0	0	0	4	—	—	—	—	—
1999–00	Dynamo-Energiya Yekaterinburg-2	Russia3	11	5	4	9	22	—	—	—	—	—
2000–01	Dynamo-Energiya Yekaterinburg	Russia	19	0	0	0	14	—	—	—	—	—
2000–01	Dynamo-Energiya Yekaterinburg-2	Russia3	1	0	1	1	0	—	—	—	—	—
2000–01	Kedr Novouralsk	Russia2	20	1	3	4	44	—	—	—	—	—
2001–02	Dynamo-Energiya Yekaterinburg	Russia2	24	3	3	6	22	—	—	—	—	—
2001–02	Kedr Novouralsk	Russia2	20	2	6	8	22	—	—	—	—	—
2002–03	Dynamo-Energiya Yekaterinburg	Russia2	50	2	9	11	115	—	—	—	—	—
2002–03	Dynamo-Energiya Yekaterinburg-2	Russia3	3	0	2	2	6	—	—	—	—	—
2003–04	Sputnik Nizhny Tagil	Russia2	43	1	7	8	52	8	2	0	2	6
2004–05	Sputnik Nizhny Tagil	Russia2	43	4	11	15	46	7	2	2	4	18
2005–06	Sputnik Nizhny Tagil	Russia2	48	5	7	12	66	9	1	1	2	22
2006–07	Sputnik Nizhny Tagil	Russia2	56	6	11	17	74	4	0	0	0	14
2007–08	Avtomobilist Yekaterinburg	Russia2	49	2	15	17	54	12	2	2	4	10
2008–09	Yugra Khanty-Mansiysk	Russia2	54	3	14	17	80	16	1	2	3	18
2009–10	Avtomobilist Yekaterinburg	KHL	44	6	7	13	32	3	0	1	1	2
2010–11	Sputnik Nizhny Tagil	VHL	9	0	2	2	12	—	—	—	—	—
2010–11	Beibarys Atyrau	Kazakhstan	24	0	10	10	30	—	—	—	—	—
2011–12	Mechel Chelyabinsk	VHL	53	5	15	20	62	9	0	3	3	41
2014–15	Debreceni Hoki Klub	MOL Liga	41	5	9	14	42	2	0	0	0	0
2015–16	HK Michalovce	Slovak2	38	6	7	13	44	5	0	2	2	4
2016–17	Dubai White Bears	UAE	4	1	7	8	0	4	0	3	3	2
2017–18	Dubai White Bears	UAE	2	0	0	0	2	2	0	0	0	0
KHL totals			44	6	7	13	32	3	0	1	1	2
Russia totals			55	0	0	0	34	—	—	—	—	—
Russia2 totals			527	36	92	128	748	56	8	7	15	88
VHL totals			62	5	17	22	74	9	0	3	3	41
