= Konstantin Spodarenko =

- Born: April 25, 1972; Ust-Kamenogorsk, Kazakh SSR, Soviet Union
- Height: 6 ft 0 in (183 cm)
- Weight: 187 lb (85 kg; 13 st 5 lb)
- Position: Forward
- Shot: Left
- Played for: Torpedo Ust-Kamenogorsk; Neftyanik Almetievsk; Energia Kemerovo; Yuzhny Ural Orsk
- Playing career: 1988–2008

Konstantin Grigorievich Spodarenko (Russian: Константин Григорьевич Сподаренко; born April 4, 1972) is a retired Kazakh professional ice hockey player.

== Career statistics ==
			Regular season					Playoffs
Season	Team	League	GP	G	A	Pts	PIM	GP	G	A	Pts	PIM
1988–89	Torpedo Ust-Kamenogorsk	Soviet2	2	0	0	0	2	—	—	—	—	—
1989–90	Torpedo Ust-Kamenogorsk	Soviet	13	2	0	2	4	—	—	—	—	—
1990–91	Torpedo Ust-Kamenogorsk	Soviet	30	2	3	5	4	—	—	—	—	—
1991–92	Torpedo Ust-Kamenogorsk	Soviet	30	4	4	8	10	6	1	0	1	2
1991–92	Torpedo Ust-Kamenogorsk-2	Soviet3	4	2	2	4	2	—	—	—	—	—
1992–93	Torpedo Ust-Kamenogorsk	Russia	23	1	1	2	6	2	1	0	1	2
1992–93	Torpedo Ust-Kamenogorsk-2	Russia2	20	12	6	18	10	—	—	—	—	—
1993–94	Torpedo Ust-Kamenogorsk	Russia	21	2	0	2	6	—	—	—	—	—
1993–94	Torpedo Ust-Kamenogorsk-2	Russia3	—	8	5	13	—	—	—	—	—	—
1994–95	Torpedo Ust-Kamenogorsk	Russia	18	1	0	1	0	1	0	0	0	0
1994–95	Torpedo Ust-Kamenogorsk-2	Russia2	—	1	—	—	—	—	—	—	—	—
1995–96	Torpedo Ust-Kamenogorsk	Russia	23	5	3	8	12	—	—	—	—	—
1995–96	Torpedo Ust-Kamenogorsk-2	Russia2	7	0	4	4	2	—	—	—	—	—
1996–97	Torpedo Ust-Kamenogorsk	Russia2	32	16	13	29	28	—	—	—	—	—
1996–97	Torpedo Ust-Kamenogorsk-2	Russia3	1	1	2	3	0	—	—	—	—	—
1997–98	Torpedo Ust-Kamenogorsk	Russia2	32	16	13	29	28	—	—	—	—	—
1998–99	Torpedo Ust-Kamenogorsk	Russia2	14	3	6	9	20	—	—	—	—	—
1999–00	Neftyanik Almetyevsk	Russia2	34	8	4	12	22	—	—	—	—	—
2000–01	Energia Kemerovo	Russia2	48	17	13	30	30	—	—	—	—	—
2001–02	Energia Kemerovo	Russia2	54	23	15	38	30	14	7	0	7	8
2002–03	Energia Kemerovo	Russia2	50	18	25	43	26	13	2	4	6	2
2003–04	Energia Kemerovo	Russia2	51	10	15	25	20	6	2	1	3	2
2004–05	Energia Kemerovo	Russia2	52	12	20	32	22	3	1	2	3	0
2005–06	Energia Kemerovo	Russia2	47	10	17	27	24	5	1	1	2	6
2006–07	Energia Kemerovo	Russia2	48	8	6	14	20	—	—	—	—	—
2007–08	Yuzhny Ural Orsk	Russia2	12	0	0	0	0	—	—	—	—	—
Russia totals			85	9	4	13	24	3	1	0	1	2
Russia2 totals			493	152	158	309	272	41	13	8	21	18
