= Pyotr Devyatkin =

Kazakhstani ice hockey player

Personal information
- Born: 8 March 1977 Oskemen, Kazakh SSR, Soviet Union
- Died: 10 September 2016 (aged 39) Novosibirsk, Russia
- Height: 174 cm (5 ft 9 in)
- Weight: 90 kg (198 lb)

Sport
- Sport: Ice hockey

Pyotr Gennadyevich Devyatkin (Russian: Пётр Геннадьевич Девяткин; 8 March 1977 – 10 September 2016) was a Kazakhstani ice hockey forward.

== Career ==
Devyatkin competed for Kazakhstan at the 1998 Winter Olympics, where his team placed fifth. At the club level, he mostly played in Russia. After retiring from competitive play, he worked as an ice hockey coach in Poronaysk.

== Death ==
Devyatkin died in Novosibirsk at the age of 39. He is thought to have taken his own life.

== Career statistics ==
=== Regular season and playoffs ===
			Regular season					Playoffs
Season	Team	League	GP	G	A	Pts	PIM	GP	G	A	Pts	PIM
1993–94	Dynamo–2 Moscow	RUS.3	34	8	6	14	16	—	—	—	—	—
1994–95	Dynamo Moscow	IHL	3	1	0	1	0	—	—	—	—	—
1994–95	Dynamo–2 Moscow	RUS.2	43	15	6	21	12	—	—	—	—	—
1995–96	Neftekhimik Nizhnekamsk	IHL	39	3	4	7	8	—	—	—	—	—
1995–96	Neftekhimik–2 Nizhnekamsk	RUS.2	3	0	0	0	0	—	—	—	—	—
1996–97	Dynamo Moscow	RSL	8	2	0	2	0	—	—	—	—	—
1996–97	Dynamo–2 Moscow	RUS.3	22	11	3	14	6	—	—	—	—	—
1996–97	Salavat Yulaev Ufa	RSL	8	0	4	4	2	4	0	0	0	0
1996–97	Novoil Ufa	RUS.3	4	0	0	0	0	—	—	—	—	—
1997–98	Torpedo Ust–Kamenogorsk	RUS.2	2	0	0	0	2	—	—	—	—	—
1997–98	Salavat Yulaev Ufa	RSL	36	11	10	21	12	—	—	—	—	—
1997–98	Novoil Ufa	RUS.3	2	1	1	2	2	—	—	—	—	—
1998–99	Salavat Yulaev Ufa	RSL	24	6	4	10	6	4	0	0	0	0
1998–99	Novoil Ufa	RUS.3	2	1	5	6	2	—	—	—	—	—
1999–2000	Salavat Yulaev Ufa	RSL	33	5	4	9	12	—	—	—	—	—
1999–2000	Salavat Yulaev–2 Ufa	RUS.3	1	2	0	2	0	—	—	—	—	—
2000–01	Salavat Yulaev–2 Ufa	RUS.3	8	4	8	12	4	—	—	—	—	—
2000–01	Spartak Moscow	RUS.2	6	0	0	0	0	—	—	—	—	—
2000–01	Spartak–2 Moscow	RUS.3	3	1	3	4	2	—	—	—	—	—
2000–01	Amur Khabarovsk	RSL	14	3	0	3	0	—	—	—	—	—
2000–01	Samorodok Khabarovsk	RUS.3	1	0	0	0	0	—	—	—	—	—
2001–02	Neftyanik Leninogorsk	RUS.2	34	14	9	23	43	—	—	—	—	—
2002–03	Neftyanik Leninogorsk	RUS.2	48	12	10	22	10	14	4	1	5	4
2003–04	Neftyanik Leninogorsk	RUS.2	24	2	6	8	8	—	—	—	—	—
2003–04	Dizel Penza	RUS.2	26	4	4	8	4	4	0	2	2	0
2004–05	Dizel Penza	RUS.2	7	0	0	0	0	—	—	—	—	—
2004–05	Dizel–2 Penza	RUS.3	2	1	2	3	0	—	—	—	—	—
2004–05	Dinamo Minsk	BLR	17	3	3	6	4	—	—	—	—	—
2005–06	Izhstal Izhevsk	RUS.2	11	0	1	1	2	—	—	—	—	—
2005–06	Izhstal–2 Izhevsk	RUS.3	2	1	3	4	0	—	—	—	—	—
2005–06	Olimpiya Kirovo–Chepetsk	RUS.2	3	0	0	0	0	—	—	—	—	—
2005–06	Stal Asha	RUS.4	22	13	21	34	2	—	—	—	—	—
2006–07	Kristall–Yugra Beloyarsky	RUS.3	9	1	2	3	0	—	—	—	—	—
2006–07	Stal Asha	RUS.4	33	45	26	71	12	—	—	—	—	—
2007–08	Stal Asha	RUS.4	—	—	—	—	—		1	1	2
RUS.3 totals			90	31	33	64	32	—	—	—	—	—
RUS.2 totals			207	47	36	83	81	18	4	3	7	4
RSL totals			165	31	26	57	40	8	0	0	0	2

=== International ===
Year	Team	Event	GP	G	A	Pts	PIM
1996	Kazakhstan	WJC C	4	7	2	9	2
1997	Kazakhstan	WJC B	7	6	6	12	0
1998	Kazakhstan	OG	7	0	0	0	25
1999	Kazakhstan	WC B	7	2	1	3	2
1999	Kazakhstan	WC Q	3	0	0	0	0
Junior totals			11	13	8	21	2
Senior totals			17	2	1	3	27

"Pyotr Devyatkin". Elite Prospects.
