= Oleg Kryazhev =

Kazakhstani ice hockey player

- Born: October 9, 1970 (age 54); Ust-Kamenogorsk, Kazakh SSR, Soviet Union
- Height: 5 ft 8 in (173 cm)
- Weight: 194 lb (88 kg; 13 st 12 lb)
- Position: Left wing
- Shot: Left
- Played for: Kazzinc-Torpedo; Avangard Omsk; Sibir Novosibirsk; Energia Kemerovo; Gazovik Tyumen; Yermak Angarsk
- National team: Kazakhstan
- Playing career: 1986–2009

Oleg Vladimirovich Kryazhev (Russian: Оле́г Влади́мирович Кря́жев), born October 9, 1970, in Ust-Kamenogorsk, Kazakh SSR, Soviet Union) is a retired Kazakhstani professional ice hockey player, who played for Team Kazakhstan at the 1998 Winter Olympic Games.

== Career statistics ==
=== Regular season and playoffs ===
			Regular season					Playoffs
Season	Team	League	GP	G	A	Pts	PIM	GP	G	A	Pts	PIM
1986–87	Torpedo Ust–Kamenogorsk	URS.2	1	0	0	0	0	—	—	—	—	—
1988–89	Torpedo Ust–Kamenogorsk	URS.2	2	0	0	0	0	—	—	—	—	—
1988–89	SKA Sverdlovsk	URS.2	19	5	1	6	0	—	—	—	—	—
1989–90	SKA Sverdlovsk	URS.2	60	25	15	40	16	—	—	—	—	—
1990–91	Metallurg Serov	URS.2	72	28	30	58	28	—	—	—	—	—
1991–92	Torpedo Ust–Kamenogorsk	CIS	34	8	3	11	12	6	0	3	3	0
1992–93	Torpedo Ust–Kamenogorsk	IHL	41	8	6	14	12	3	1	1	2	2
1992–93	Torpedo–2 Ust–Kamenogorsk	RUS.2	2	4	0	4	0	—	—	—	—	—
1993–94	Torpedo Ust–Kamenogorsk	KAZ	12	13	8	21		—	—	—	—	—
1993–94	Torpedo Ust–Kamenogorsk	IHL	43	8	16	24	18	—	—	—	—	—
1994–95	Avangard Omsk	IHL	52	21	10	31	26	6	1	0	1	0
1994–95	Avangard–2 Omsk	RUS.2		4	0	4		—	—	—	—	—
1995–96	Avangard Omsk	IHL	49	17	17	34	32	3	0	0	0	0
1996–97	Avangard Omsk	RSL	43	12	21	33	10	5	3	2	5	4
1997–98	Avangard Omsk	RSL	46	5	10	15	18	5	0	0	0	6
1998–99	Avangard Omsk	RSL	39	14	6	20	30	6	2	1	3	4
1999–2000	Avangard Omsk	RSL	37	2	9	11	16	8	1	1	2	8
2000–01	Sibir Novosibirsk	RUS.2	47	21	19	40	18	14	7	8	15	8
2000–01	Sibir–2 Novosibirsk	RUS.3	1	1	0	1	0	—	—	—	—	—
2001–02	Sibir Novosibirsk	RUS.2	28	5	12	17	2	13	1	9	10	2
2001–02	Sibir–2 Novosibirsk	RUS.3	2	1	2	3	0	—	—	—	—	—
2002–03	Kazzinc–Torpedo	RUS.2	47	10	31	41	16	—	—	—	—	—
2003–04	Kazzinc–Torpedo	KAZ	4	0	2	2	0	—	—	—	—	—
2003–04	Kazzinc–Torpedo	RUS.2	14	0	5	5	6	—	—	—	—	—
2003–04	Energia Kemerovo	RUS.2	27	11	12	23	10	6	2	2	4	0
2004–05	Energia Kemerovo	RUS.2	47	12	14	26	10	2	0	0	0	0
2005–06	Energia Kemerovo	RUS.2	48	17	16	33	30	5	0	0	0	0
2006–07	Energia Kemerovo	RUS.2	55	11	36	47	34	—	—	—	—	—
2007–08	Gazovik Tyumen	RUS.2	34	3	14	17	20	—	—	—	—	—
2007–08	Kazzinc–Torpedo	RUS.2	8	2	2	4	0	6	0	2	2	2
2008–09	Yermak Angarsk	RUS.2	36	2	6	8	36	—	—	—	—	—
IHL totals			185	54	49	103	88	12	2	1	3	2
RUS.2 totals			393	98	167	265	182	46	10	21	31	12
RSL totals			165	33	46	79	74	24	6	4	10	22

- RUS.2 totals do not include stats from the 1994–95 season.

=== International ===
Year	Team	Event	GP	G	A	Pts	PIM
1994	Kazakhstan	WC C	6	5	4	9	10
1996	Kazakhstan	WC C	7	6	10	16	2
1997	Kazakhstan	WC B	7	1	1	2	4
1998	Kazakhstan	OG	7	0	0	0	0
1998	Kazakhstan	WC	3	0	1	1	0
1999	Kazakhstan	WC B	7	2	2	4	0
2003	Kazakhstan	WC D1	5	4	4	8	0
Senior totals			42	18	22	40	16
