= Ilya Solaryov =

Kazakhstani ice hockey player

- Born: August 2, 1982 (age 43) Perm, Soviet Union
- Height: 6 ft 3 in (191 cm)
- Weight: 198 lb (90 kg; 14 st 2 lb)
- Position: Right wing
- Shot: left
- Played for: Molot-Prikamie Perm; Motor Barnaul; Energia Kemerovo; HC Lipetsk; Kazakhmys Satpaev; Yertis Pavlodar; Barys Astana
- National team: Kazakhstan
- NHL draft: 281st overall, 2001; Tampa Bay Lightning
- Playing career: 2000–2017

Ilya Solaryov
Medal record

Men's ice hockey

Representing Kazakhstan

Asian Games
Gold medal – first place	2011 Astana-Almaty	Ice hockey

Ilya Sergeyevich Solaryov also known as Ilya Solarev (Russian: Илья Сергеевич Соларёв; born August 2, 1982) is a Kazakhstani former professional ice hockey winger. He played for Barys Astana of the Kontinental Hockey League (KHL). He was selected by the Tampa Bay Lightning in the 9th round (281st overall) of the 2001 NHL entry draft.

Solaryov has played 119 regular season games and 14 playoff contests in the Kontinental Hockey League (KHL) with Barys Astana.

He participated at the 2010 IIHF World Championship as a member of the Kazakhstan men's national ice hockey team.

In September 2013, the International Ice Hockey Federation (IIHF) handed Solaryov a two-year ban following a positive test for Salbutamol. On December 5, 2013, he signed to play with the Danbury Whalers of the Federal Hockey League (FHL).

== Career statistics ==
=== Regular season and playoffs ===
			Regular season					Playoffs
Season	Team	League	GP	G	A	Pts	PIM	GP	G	A	Pts	PIM
1997–98	Molot–Prikamye–2 Perm	RUS.3	4	1	0	1	0	—	—	—	—	—
1998–99	Molot–Prikamye–2 Perm	RUS.3	20	2	6	8	10	—	—	—	—	—
1999–2000	Molot–Prikamye–2 Perm	RUS.3	35	3	2	5	24	—	—	—	—	—
2000–01	Molot–Prikamye Perm	RSL	4	0	1	1	0	—	—	—	—	—
2000–01	Molot–Prikamye–2 Perm	RUS.3	46	14	12	26	38	—	—	—	—	—
2001–02	Molot–Prikamye–2 Perm	RUS.3	12	7	0	7	10	—	—	—	—	—
2001–02	Neftyanik Leninogorsk	RUS.2	31	3	5	8	22	—	—	—	—	—
2002–03	Molot–Prikamye–2 Perm	RUS.3	16	1	6	7	6	—	—	—	—	—
2002–03	HK Brest	BLR	15	1	5	6	4	—	—	—	—	—
2002–03	HK–2 Brest	BLR.2	6	3	6	9	12	—	—	—	—	—
2003–04	Motor Barnaul	RUS.2	34	6	6	12	20	1	0	0	0	0
2003–04	Motor–2 Barnaul	RUS.3	3	2	0	2	6	—	—	—	—	—
2004–05	Energia Kemerovo	RUS.2	36	3	2	5	38	3	0	0	0	0
2005–06	HC Lipetsk	RUS.2	49	4	6	10	30	3	0	0	0	0
2006–07	Kazakhmys Satpaev	KAZ	21	7	2	9	12	—	—	—	—	—
2006–07	Kazakhmys Satpaev	RUS.2	44	17	15	32	24	—	—	—	—	—
2007–08	Kazakhmys Satpaev	RUS.2	29	10	10	20	24	—	—	—	—	—
2007–08	Barys Astana	RUS.2	22	4	9	13	26	—	—	—	—	—
2008–09	Barys Astana	KHL	46	8	7	15	24	—	—	—	—	—
2009–10	Barys Astana	KHL	37	5	4	9	20	3	0	1	1	4
2009–10	Barys–2 Astana	KAZ	7	6	4	10	6	—	—	—	—	—
2010–11	Barys Astana	KHL	4	1	1	2	2	4	0	0	0	2
2010–11	Barys–2 Astana	KAZ	40	19	30	49	22	15	3	2	5	14
2011–12	Yertis Pavlodar	KAZ	49	20	22	42	24	10	2	5	7	8
2012–13	Barys Astana	KHL	32	1	4	5	12	7	0	0	0	0
2012–13	Barys–2 Astana	KAZ	2	1	0	1	2	—	—	—	—	—
2013–14	Danbury Whalers	FHL	33	17	25	42	22	5	1	4	5	4
2014–15	Danbury Whalers	FHL	47	25	35	60	12	3	3	0	3	2
2015–16	Yertis Pavlodar	KAZ	24	7	9	16	14	—	—	—	—	—
2015–16	Barys Astana	KHL	27	0	1	1	43	—	—	—	—	—
2015–16	Nomad Astana	KAZ	3	1	1	2	0	5	1	0	1	4
2016–17	Molot–Prikamye Perm	VHL	12	2	1	3	4	—	—	—	—	—
2016–17	HSC Csíkszereda	MOL	21	11	7	18		—	—	—	—	—
2016–17	HSC Csíkszereda	ROU	20	21	11	32	10	9	5	4	9	2
RUS.2 totals			245	47	53	100	184	14	2	1	3	6
KAZ totals			146	61	68	129	80	30	6	7	13	26
KHL totals			146	15	17	32	101	14	0	1	1	6

=== International ===
Year	Team	Event	GP	G	A	Pts	PIM
2008	Kazakhstan	WC D1	5	1	4	5	4
2009	Kazakhstan	OGQ	6	3	5	8	2
2009	Kazakhstan	WC D1	5	3	4	7	4
2010	Kazakhstan	WC	6	0	0	0	2
2011	Kazakhstan	AWG	4	3	2	5	2
2013	Kazakhstan	OGQ	3	1	0	1	2
2013	Kazakhstan	WC D1A	5	1	0	1	2
2016	Kazakhstan	WC	7	0	1	1	4
Senior totals			41	12	16	28	22
