= Mikhail Kuklev =

Russian ice hockey player (born 1982)

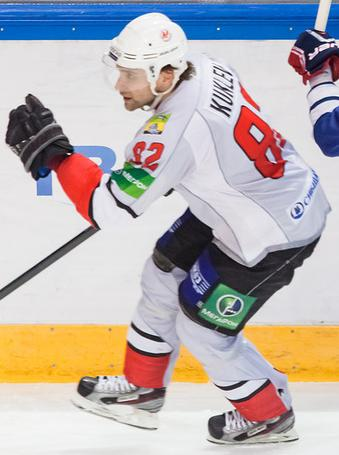
- Born: August 24, 1982 (age 43) Moscow, Russian SFSR
- Height: 5 ft 11 in (180 cm)
- Weight: 187 lb (85 kg; 13 st 5 lb)
- Position: Defence
- Shot: Left
- Slovak team Former teams: HC 07 Detva; Severstal Cherepovets; Metallurg Novokuznetsk
- Playing career: 2000–2020

Mikhail Kuklev (born August 24, 1982) is a Russian professional ice hockey defenceman. He currently plays with HC 07 Detva in the Slovak Extraliga.

Kuklev made his Kontinental Hockey League debut playing with Severstal Cherepovets during the inaugural 2008–09 KHL season.

== Career statistics ==
			Regular season					Playoffs
Season	Team	League	GP	G	A	Pts	PIM	GP	G	A	Pts	PIM
1998–99	HC Dynamo Moscow-2	Russia2	1	0	0	0	0	—	—	—	—	—
1999–00	HC Dynamo Moscow-2	Russia3	25	0	5	5	16	—	—	—	—	—
2000–01	HC Dynamo Moscow-2	Russia3	1	0	0	0	0	—	—	—	—	—
2000–01	THK Tver	Russia2	33	4	4	8	43	—	—	—	—	—
2001–02	CSK VVS Samara	Russia2	43	2	5	7	28	—	—	—	—	—
2001–02	CSK VVS Samara-2	Russia3	3	0	2	2	0	—	—	—	—	—
2002–03	CSK VVS Samara	Russia2	41	4	8	12	52	—	—	—	—	—
2003–04	Neftyanik Leninogorsk	Russia2	52	2	8	10	98	3	0	0	0	6
2004–05	Neftyanik Leninogorsk	Russia2	48	5	10	15	89	4	0	0	0	2
2005–06	Neftyanik Leninogorsk	Russia2	55	7	10	17	72	3	0	1	1	6
2006–07	Metallurg Novokuznetsk	Russia	35	1	1	2	20	—	—	—	—	—
2006–07	Metallurg Novokuznetsk-2	Russia3	1	0	0	0	2	—	—	—	—	—
2006–07	Zauralie Kurgan	Russia2	8	1	1	2	8	4	1	1	2	16
2007–08	Severstal Cherepovets	Russia	56	1	6	7	57	8	1	0	1	16
2008–09	Severstal Cherepovets	KHL	44	1	5	6	89	—	—	—	—	—
2009–10	Severstal Cherepovets	KHL	24	1	1	2	26	—	—	—	—	—
2010–11	Krylya Sovetov Moscow	VHL	22	2	4	6	30	—	—	—	—	—
2010–11	Metallurg Novokuznetsk	KHL	11	0	0	0	2	—	—	—	—	—
2011–12	Metallurg Novokuznetsk	KHL	52	4	12	16	32	—	—	—	—	—
2012–13	Metallurg Novokuznetsk	KHL	34	1	7	8	30	—	—	—	—	—
2013–14	Metallurg Novokuznetsk	KHL	31	1	1	2	14	—	—	—	—	—
2014–15	Metallurg Novokuznetsk	KHL	36	1	8	9	42	—	—	—	—	—
2015–16	Metallurg Novokuznetsk	KHL	50	1	1	2	61	—	—	—	—	—
2016–17	Metallurg Novokuznetsk	KHL	55	0	2	2	67	—	—	—	—	—
2017–18	HK Detva	Slovak	47	2	4	6	62	—	—	—	—	—
2018–19	HK Detva	Slovak	40	4	8	12	75	9	0	0	0	18
2019–20	HK Detva	Slovak	32	0	0	0	26	—	—	—	—	—
KHL totals			337	10	37	47	363	—	—	—	—	—
Russia2 totals			281	25	46	71	390	14	1	2	3	32
Slovak totals			119	6	12	18	163	9	0	0	0	18
