= Oleg Gubin =

Russian ice hockey player

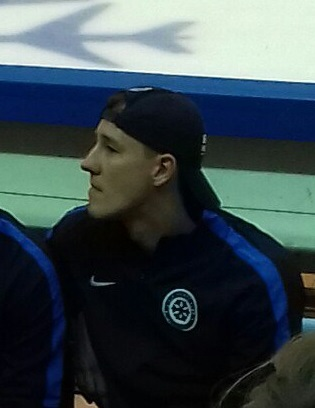
- Oleg Gubin at the meeting of the Siberia team with the fans on August 19, 2016
- Born: April 12, 1981 (age 44) Voskresensk, Moscow Oblast, Russian SFSR, Soviet Union
- Height: 6 ft 1 in (185 cm)
- Weight: 181 lb (82 kg; 12 st 13 lb)
- Position: Centre
- Shot: Right
- Played for: HC Neftekhimik Nizhnekamsk; Krylia Sovetov; Severstal Cherepovets; Spartak Moscow; HC Sibir Novosibirsk; Avtomobilist Yekaterinburg; Amur Khabarovsk; Khimik Voskresensk
- Playing career: 2004–2024

Oleg Gubin (born April 12, 1981) is a Russian professional ice hockey forward who is currently playing for Khimik Voskresensk in the Supreme Hockey League (VHL). He previously played for Amur Khabarovsk of the Kontinental Hockey League (KHL).

== Career statistics ==
			Regular season					Playoffs
Season	Team	League	GP	G	A	Pts	PIM	GP	G	A	Pts	PIM
1999–00	Kristall Saratov	Russia2	23	4	2	6	0	—	—	—	—	—
1999–00	HC Dynamo Moscow-2	Russia3	5	1	2	3	4	—	—	—	—	—
2000–01	Neftyanik Leninogorsk	Russia2	34	4	1	5	8	—	—	—	—	—
2001–02	Neftyanik Leninogorsk	Russia2	37	10	12	22	14	—	—	—	—	—
2002–03	Neftyanik Leninogorsk	Russia2	32	8	11	19	28	—	—	—	—	—
2002–03	Khimik Voskresensk	Russia2	16	7	1	8	10	14	1	1	2	2
2003–04	Kristall Elektrostal	Russia2	18	0	3	3	6	—	—	—	—	—
2003–04	Neftyanik Leninogorsk	Russia2	39	8	19	27	38	3	1	0	1	4
2004–05	HC Neftekhimik Nizhnekamsk	Russia	1	0	0	0	0	—	—	—	—	—
2004–05	HC Neftekhimik Nizhnekamsk-2	Russia3	6	1	5	6	2	—	—	—	—	—
2004–05	Neftyanik Leninogorsk	Russia2	35	5	24	29	38	4	0	0	0	6
2005–06	Krylya Sovetov Moscow	Russia2	51	21	24	45	50	4	0	0	0	2
2006–07	Krylya Sovetov Moscow	Russia	30	13	17	30	56	—	—	—	—	—
2006–07	Severstal Cherepovets	Russia	16	0	5	5	6	5	0	0	0	2
2007–08	Severstal Cherepovets	Russia	54	11	18	29	16	8	2	2	4	4
2008–09	Severstal Cherepovets	KHL	52	9	9	18	36	—	—	—	—	—
2009–10	Severstal Cherepovets	KHL	54	10	15	25	44	—	—	—	—	—
2010–11	Severstal Cherepovets	KHL	6	0	3	3	4	—	—	—	—	—
2010–11	HC Spartak Moscow	KHL	47	14	10	24	34	4	0	3	3	12
2011–12	HC Spartak Moscow	KHL	51	4	8	12	34	—	—	—	—	—
2012–13	HC Spartak Moscow	KHL	47	7	5	12	18	—	—	—	—	—
2012–13	HC Sibir Novosibirsk	KHL	4	0	1	1	8	7	0	0	0	2
2013–14	HC Sibir Novosibirsk	KHL	46	7	2	9	10	10	3	1	4	2
2014–15	HC Sibir Novosibirsk	KHL	60	6	13	19	23	16	1	5	6	6
2015–16	HC Sibir Novosibirsk	KHL	60	14	15	29	18	10	1	2	3	27
2016–17	HC Sibir Novosibirsk	KHL	26	1	3	4	6	—	—	—	—	—
2016–17	Avtomobilist Yekaterinburg	KHL	27	1	3	4	14	—	—	—	—	—
2017–18	Amur Khabarovsk	KHL	14	2	1	3	10	—	—	—	—	—
2017–18	HC Spartak Moscow	KHL	2	0	0	0	2	—	—	—	—	—
2017–18	Khimik Voskresensk	VHL	25	2	4	6	18	4	0	0	0	4
2018–19	Khimik Voskresensk	VHL	42	10	13	23	6	4	0	1	1	2
2019–20	Khimik Voskresensk	VHL	53	9	10	19	10	5	2	0	2	4
2020–21	Khimik Voskresensk	VHL	47	10	23	33	20	9	0	3	3	2
2021–22	Khimik Voskresensk	VHL	50	11	21	32	18	11	1	3	4	6
2022–23	Khimik Voskresensk	VHL	44	8	10	18	22	20	6	8	14	33
2023–24	Khimik Voskresensk	VHL	47	6	25	31	10	13	4	1	5	8
KHL totals			496	75	88	163	261	47	5	11	16	49
Russia totals			101	24	40	64	78	13	2	2	4	6
VHL totals			308	56	106	162	104	66	13	16	29	59
Russia2 totals			285	67	97	164	192	25	2	1	3	14
