= Pavel Lazarev =

Russian ice hockey player

- Born: March 31, 1970; Chelyabinsk, Russian SFSR, Soviet Union
- Died: 3 September 2018 (aged 48) near Chelyabinsk, Chelyabinsk Oblast, Russia
- Height: 5 ft 10 in (178 cm)
- Weight: 190 lb (86 kg; 13 st 8 lb)
- Position: Centre
- Shot: Left
- Played for: Metallurg Chelyabinsk; Traktor Chelyabinsk; Mechel Chelyabinsk; HC Lada Togliatti; Ak Bars Kazan; Rødovre Mighty Bulls; Energia Kemerovo; Sputnik Nizhny Tagil; Mostovik Kurgan
- National team: Russia
- Playing career: 1987–2005

Pavel Lazarev (March 31, 1970 – September 03, 2018) was a Soviet and a Russian former professional ice hockey forward, who played for the Russia in (Izvestia Trophy 1994). He is a two-time Russian Champion

== Career statistics ==
| | | | Regular season | | | | | Playoffs |
| Season | Team | League | GP | G | A | Pts | PIM | GP | G | A | Pts | PIM |
|---|---|---|---|---|---|---|---|---|---|---|---|---|
| 1987–88 | Metallurg Chelyabinsk | Soviet2 | 3 | 0 | 0 | 0 | 0 | — | — | — | — | — |
| 1988–89 | Metallurg Chelyabinsk | Soviet2 | 6 | 1 | 0 | 1 | 2 | — | — | — | — | — |
| 1989–90 | Metallurg Chelyabinsk | Soviet2 | 35 | 11 | 10 | 21 | 24 | — | — | — | — | — |
| 1989–90 | Traktor Chelyabinsk | Soviet | 1 | 0 | 0 | 0 | 0 | — | — | — | — | — |
| 1990–91 | Traktor Chelyabinsk | Soviet | 27 | 5 | 5 | 10 | 50 | — | — | — | — | — |
| 1991–92 | Traktor Chelyabinsk | Soviet | 36 | 7 | 9 | 16 | 62 | 7 | 6 | 5 | 11 | 14 |
| 1991–92 | Mechel Chelyabinsk | Soviet2 | 4 | 0 | 1 | 1 | 6 | — | — | — | — | — |
| 1992–93 | Traktor Chelyabinsk | Russia | 34 | 4 | 11 | 15 | 12 | 8 | 0 | 0 | 0 | 0 |
| 1992–93 | Mechel Chelyabinsk | Russia2]] | 2 | 1 | 0 | 1 | 4 | — | — | — | — | — |
| 1993–94 | Traktor Chelyabinsk | Russia | 46 | 11 | 18 | 29 | 14 | 6 | 1 | 0 | 1 | 6 |
| 1994–95 | Traktor Chelyabinsk | Russia | 52 | 27 | 23 | 50 | 48 | 3 | 0 | 3 | 3 | 14 |
| 1995–96 | HC Lada Togliatti | Russia | 52 | 10 | 13 | 23 | 47 | 7 | 0 | 2 | 2 | 4 |
| 1996–97 | Traktor Chelyabinsk | Russia | 40 | 8 | 10 | 18 | 70 | 2 | 0 | 1 | 1 | 2 |
| 1997–98 | Traktor Chelyabinsk | Russia | 24 | 5 | 6 | 11 | 12 | — | — | — | — | — |
| 1997–98 | Traktor Chelyabinsk | WPHL | 3 | 2 | 0 | 2 | 2 | — | — | — | — | — |
| 1997–98 | Yunior Kurgan | Russia3 | 6 | 0 | 3 | 3 | 4 | — | — | — | — | — |
| 1997–98 | Ak Bars Kazan | Russia | 12 | 1 | 2 | 3 | 4 | 3 | 0 | 0 | 0 | 4 |
| 1998–99 | Mechel Chelyabinsk | Russia | 41 | 8 | 12 | 20 | 22 | — | — | — | — | — |
| 1998–99 | Traktor Chelyabinsk | Russia | — | — | — | — | — | — | — | — | — | — |
| 1999–00 | Rødovre Mighty Bulls | Denmark | 34 | 12 | 19 | 31 | 34 | — | — | — | — | — |
| 2000–01 | Traktor Chelyabinsk | Russia2 | 44 | 13 | 18 | 31 | 131 | 5 | 0 | 1 | 1 | 2 |
| 2001–02 | Energia Kemerovo | Russia2 | 20 | 3 | 5 | 8 | 12 | — | — | — | — | — |
| 2001–02 | Sputnik Nizhny Tagil | Russia2 | 21 | 7 | 11 | 18 | 4 | — | — | — | — | — |
| 2002–03 | Mostovik Kurgan | Russia2 | 8 | 0 | 0 | 0 | 2 | — | — | — | — | — |
| 2002–03 | Sputnik Nizhny Tagil | Russia2 | 32 | 15 | 10 | 25 | 26 | 11 | 2 | 1 | 3 | 4 |
| 2003–04 | Traktor Chelyabinsk | Russia2 | 47 | 9 | 18 | 27 | 68 | 14 | 1 | 3 | 4 | 10 |
| 2004–05 | Traktor Chelyabinsk | Russia2 | 42 | 4 | 18 | 22 | 37 | 7 | 0 | 2 | 2 | 12 |
| 2004–05 | Traktor Chelyabinsk-2 | Russia3 | 1 | 1 | 0 | 1 | 4 | — | — | — | — | — |
| Russia totals | | | 301 | 74 | 95 | 169 | 229 | 50 | 6 | 18 | 24 | 62 |
| Russia2 totals | | | 216 | 52 | 80 | 132 | 284 | 37 | 3 | 7 | 10 | 28 |

== Awards and honours ==
| Award | Year |
|---|---|
Russian Championship
| Champion (HC Lada Togliatti) | 1996 |
Russian Superleague
| Champion (Ak Bars Kazan) | 1998 |
