= 1999–2000 Vysshaya Liga season =

Russian ice hockey league season

The 1999–2000 Vysshaya Liga season was the eighth season of the Vysshaya Liga, the second level of ice hockey in Russia. 23 teams participated in the league. The top four teams in the final round qualified for an opportunity to be promoted to the Russian Superleague.

== First round ==
=== Western Conference ===
	Club	GP	W	OTW	T	OTL	L	GF	GA	Pts
1.	Spartak Moscow	44	30	2	5	0	7	160	90	99
2.	Vityaz Podolsk	44	30	1	5	1	7	179	101	98
3.	Khimik Voskresensk	44	30	1	5	0	8	178	100	97
4.	HC Voronezh	44	26	1	4	1	12	171	112	85
5.	Motor Zavolzhye	44	20	3	4	2	15	152	122	72
6.	HC CSKA Moscow	44	21	1	3	0	19	198	147	68
7.	Krylya Sovetov Moscow	44	17	0	4	1	22	120	121	56
8.	Spartak St. Petersburg	44	15	1	8	0	20	132	128	55
9.	THK Tver	44	16	0	3	2	23	126	155	53
10.	Dizelist Penza	44	11	1	5	2	25	102	147	42
11.	Kristall Saratov	44	9	1	2	1	31	93	172	32
12.	Avangard Tambov	44	2	0	2	2	38	78	294	10

=== Eastern Conference ===
	Club	GP	W	OTW	T	OTL	L	GF	GA	Pts
1.	Rubin Tyumen	40	23	1	3	1	12	141	98	75
2.	Neftyanik Almetyevsk	40	21	1	5	1	12	111	89	71
3.	Sibir Novosibirsk	40	21	2	4	0	13	99	80	71
4.	Traktor Chelyabinsk	40	19	0	6	2	13	116	86	65
5.	Izhstal Izhevsk	40	18	2	4	0	16	110	84	62
6.	Nosta Yuzhny Ural Novotroitsk-Orsk	40	18	1	3	0	18	99	101	59
7.	Kedr Novouralsk	40	15	0	5	5	15	100	106	55
8.	Sputnik Nizhny Tagil	40	13	3	6	1	17	87	111	52
9.	Neftyanik Leninogorsk	40	13	2	5	0	20	95	115	48
10.	Metallurg Serov	40	10	0	8	2	20	81	119	40
11.	Motor Barnaul	40	11	1	1	1	26	69	119	37

== Final round ==
	Club	GP	W	OTW	T	OTL	L	GF	GA	Pts
1.	Neftyanik Almetyevsk	14	8	0	2	0	4	36	30	26
2.	Spartak Moscow	14	7	0	3	1	3	46	34	25
3.	Vityaz Podolsk	14	6	2	2	0	4	43	36	24
4.	Sibir Novosibirsk	14	5	2	2	1	4	41	33	22
5.	Khimik Voskresensk	14	5	1	2	0	6	42	42	19
6.	Motor Zavolzhye	14	5	0	1	1	7	40	43	17
7.	Rubin Tyumen	14	3	0	3	2	6	33	45	14
8.	Traktor Chelyabinsk	14	3	1	1	1	8	36	54	13

== Relegation ==
=== Western zone ===
	Club	GP	W	OTW	T	OTL	L	GF	GA	Pts
1.	Dizelist Penza	5	4	0	1	0	0	30	8	13
2.	Kristall Saratov	5	4	0	1	0	0	19	11	13
3.	Olimpiya Kirovo-Chepetsk	5	2	0	0	0	3	17	18	6
4.	Izhorets St. Petersburg	5	2	0	0	0	3	12	18	6
5.	MGU Moscow	5	2	0	0	0	3	20	26	6
6.	Avangard Tambov	5	0	0	0	0	5	15	32	0

=== Eastern zone ===
- Metallurg Serov – Mostovik Kurgan 2:3 OT, 1:8, 7:2, 4:2, 5:0
- Motor Barnaul – Energija Kemerovo 2:1, 3:6, 3:2, 1:4, 0:1
