= Gleb Klimenko =

Russian ice hockey player

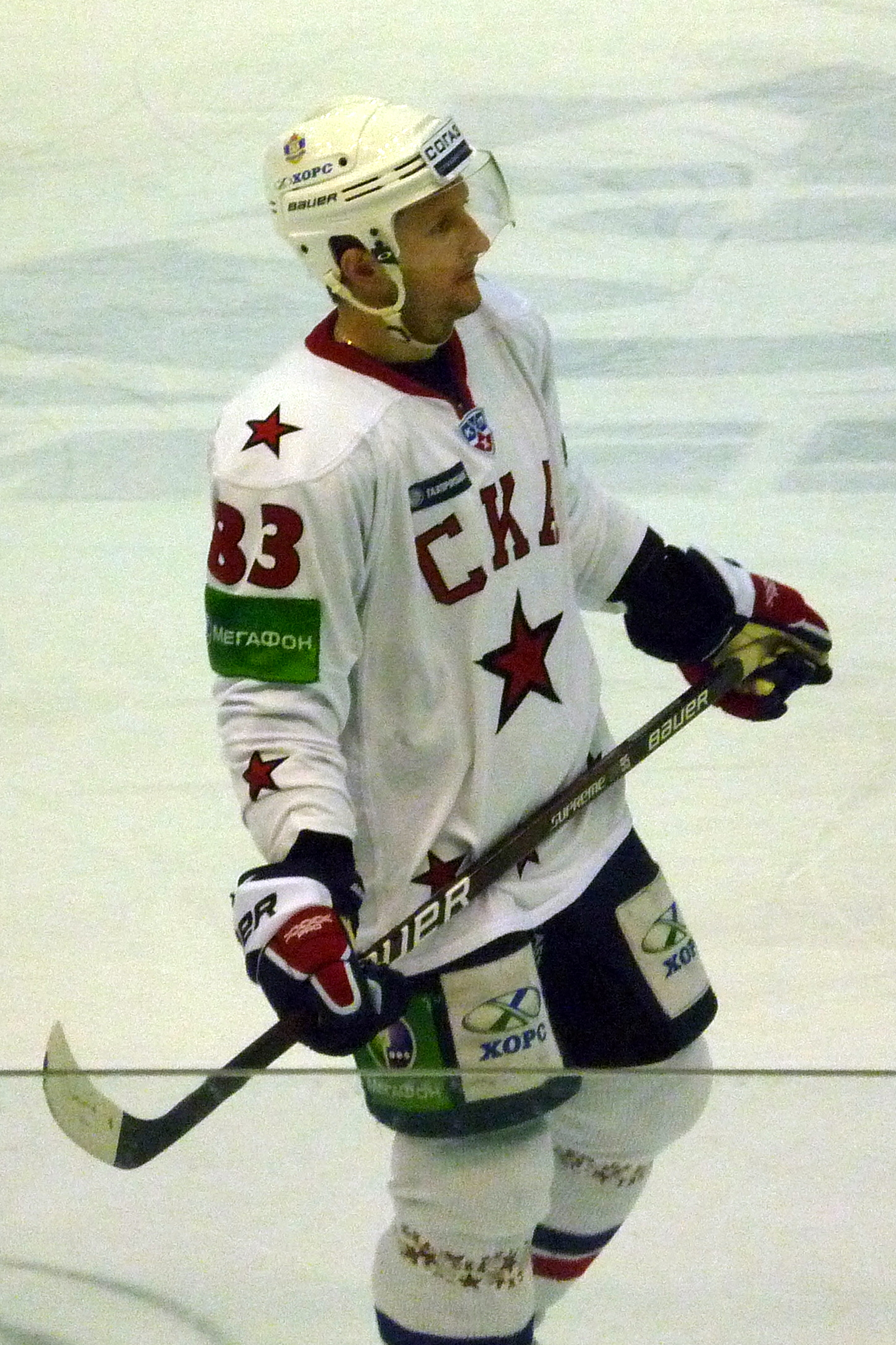
- Klimenko with SKA Saint Petersburgh in 2010
- Born: July 28, 1983 (age 41); Khabarovsk, Russian SFSR
- Height: 5 ft 9 in (175 cm)
- Weight: 179 lb (81 kg; 12 st 11 lb)
- Position: Left wing
- Shot: Right
- Played for: HC Spartak Moscow; HC Vityaz; Ak Bars Kazan; SKA Saint Petersburg; Metallurg Magnitogorsk; Atlant Moscow Oblast; Severstal Cherepovets; HC Neftekhimik Nizhnekamsk; Avtomobilist Yekaterinburg; Amur Khabarovsk
- Playing career: 1999–2020

Gleb Viktorovich Klimenko (Russian: Глеб Викторович Клименко; born July 28, 1983) is a Russian former professional ice hockey winger. He played in the Kontinental Hockey League (KHL) from 2008 to 2017.

== Career statistics ==
=== Regular season and playoffs ===
			Regular season					Playoffs
Season	Team	League	GP	G	A	Pts	PIM	GP	G	A	Pts	PIM
1998–99	Severstal Cherepovets-2	RUS-3	6	0	0	0	2	—	—	—	—	—
1999–00	SKA Saint Petersburg	RUS-3	21	8	1	9	44	—	—	—	—	—
2000–01	Severstal Cherepovets-2	RUS-3	44	8	9	17	54	—	—	—	—	—
2001–02	HK Lipetsk	RUS-2	32	6	3	9	20	10	1	2	3	10
2001–02	HK Lipetsk-2	RUS-3	2	0	1	1	6	—	—	—	—	—
2002–03	Severstal Cherepovets-2	RUS-3	12	4	7	11	10	—	—	—	—	—
2002–03	Torpedo Nizhny Novgorod	RUS-2	2	0	0	0	6	—	—	—	—	—
2002–03	Torpedo Nizhny Novgorod-2	RUS-3	10	5	4	9	14	—	—	—	—	—
2002–03	Neftyanik Leninogorsk	RUS-2	2	1	0	1	4	—	—	—	—	—
2002–03	HC Belgorod	RUS-4	17	10	7	17	30	—	—	—	—	—
2003–04	HC Belgorod	RUS-3	67	32	19	51	98	—	—	—	—	—
2004–05	HC Belgorod	RUS-2	48	16	5	21	125	—	—	—	—	—
2005–06	HK Dmitrov	RUS-2	24	9	7	16	52	—	—	—	—	—
2005–06	HK Dmitrov-2	RUS-3	3	2	2	4	2	—	—	—	—	—
2005–06	HC Belgorod	RUS-2	16	5	7	12	43	—	—	—	—	—
2005–06	HK Gubkin	RUS-4	2	1	0	1	2	—	—	—	—	—
2005–06	Khimik Voskresensk	RUS-2	7	0	0	0	10	2	0	1	1	0
2005–06	Khimik Voskresensk-2	RUS-3	1	0	0	0	0	—	—	—	—	—
2006–07	HC Belgorod	RUS-2	48	21	25	46	62	7	2	1	3	0
2007–08	HC Spartak Moscow	RSL	3	0	0	0	4	—	—	—	—	—
2007–08	HC Spartak Moscow-2	RUS-3	8	7	1	8	6	—	—	—	—	—
2007–08	HC Belgorod	RUS-2	12	11	5	16	10	—	—	—	—	—
2007–08	Vityaz Chekhov	RSL	23	9	7	16	16	—	—	—	—	—
2008–09	Vityaz Chekhov	KHL	39	19	11	30	34	—	—	—	—	—
2008–09	Ak Bars Kazan	KHL	12	2	3	5	6	21	1	2	3	10
2009–10	Vityaz Chekhov	KHL	39	14	13	27	70	—	—	—	—	—
2009–10	SKA Saint Petersburg	KHL	5	1	4	5	2	2	0	0	0	0
2010–11	SKA Saint Petersburg	KHL	26	3	5	8	4	—	—	—	—	—
2010–11	Metallurg Magnitogorsk	KHL	5	2	0	2	4	20	10	4	14	10
2011–12	SKA Saint Petersburg	KHL	44	16	10	26	22	5	0	1	1	2
2012–13	SKA Saint Petersburg	KHL	35	11	7	18	16	—	—	—	—	—
2012–13	Atlant Mytishchi	KHL	4	1	2	3	4	5	0	0	0	6
2013–14	Severstal Cherepovets	KHL	19	4	2	6	6	—	—	—	—	—
2013–14	Vityaz Podolsk	KHL	23	2	4	6	8	—	—	—	—	—
2014–15	HC Neftekhimik Nizhnekamsk	KHL	20	5	1	6	20	—	—	—	—	—
2014–15	Avtomobilist Yekaterinburg	KHL	18	0	1	1	12	5	0	0	0	2
2015–16	HC Spartak Moscow	KHL	44	7	11	18	38	—	—	—	—	—
2016–17	Amur Khabarovsk	KHL	9	0	0	0	25	—	—	—	—	—
2016–17	HK Neman Grodno	BLR	12	5	3	8	33	10	3	2	5	4
2017–18	HK Neman Grodno	BLR	27	5	11	16	14	—	—	—	—	—
2017–18	GKS Tychy	POL	2	1	3	4	0	14	9	8	17	10
2018–19	GKS Tychy	POL	37	9	26	35	20	20	7	8	15	55
2019–20	GKS Tychy	POL	47	9	16	25	38	4	0	1	1	4
KHL totals			342	87	74	161	271	58	11	7	18	30
