= Pavel Voroshnin =

Russian ice hockey player

- Born: March 23, 1984 (age 42) Cheliabinsk, USSR
- Height: 6 ft 2 in (188 cm)
- Weight: 183 lb (83 kg; 13 st 1 lb)
- Position: Defence
- Shot: Left
- VHL team Former teams: Buran Voronezh; KHL; Voskresensk Khimik
- NHL draft: 172nd overall, 2003; Buffalo Sabres
- Playing career: 2004–2017

Pavel Voroshnin (born March 24, 1984) is a Russian professional ice hockey player. He was selected by Buffalo Sabres in the 6th round (172nd overall) of the 2003 NHL entry draft. He is currently playing with Buran Voronezh of the Russian Higher Hockey League.

Voroshnin played in the Kontinental Hockey League with Khimik Voskresensk during the 2008-09 season.

== Career statistics ==
			Regular season					Playoffs
Season	Team	League	GP	G	A	Pts	PIM	GP	G	A	Pts	PIM
2000–01	Traktor–2 Chelyabinsk	RUS.3	14	0	1	1	10	—	—	—	—	—
2001–02	Traktor Chelyabinsk	RUS.2	31	0	2	2	10	—	—	—	—	—
2001–02	Traktor–2 Chelyabinsk	RUS.3	15	0	2	2	2	—	—	—	—	—
2002–03	Mississauga IceDogs	OHL	68	9	27	36	81	1	0	0	0	2
2003–04	Mississauga IceDogs	OHL	18	0	4	4	6	—	—	—	—	—
2003–04	Owen Sound Attack	OHL	40	3	18	21	36	7	0	2	2	4
2004–05	Metallurg Serov	RUS.2	34	0	1	1	12	—	—	—	—	—
2004–05	Lada–2 Togliatti	RUS.3	23	2	9	11	8	—	—	—	—	—
2005–06	Lada Togliatti	RSL	33	0	1	1	18	8	0	1	1	0
2005–06	Lada–2 Togliatti	RUS.3	8	0	5	5	6	—	—	—	—	—
2006–07	Lada Togliatti	RSL	3	0	0	0	2	—	—	—	—	—
2006–07	Lada–2 Togliatti	RUS.3	4	2	3	5	8	—	—	—	—	—
2006–07	Khimik Moscow Oblast	RSL	9	0	1	1	0	—	—	—	—	—
2006–07	Khimik–2 Moscow Oblast	RUS.3	18	5	11	16	34	—	—	—	—	—
2007–08	Khimik Moscow Oblast	RSL	18	0	0	0	12	—	—	—	—	—
2007–08	Khimik–2 Moscow Oblast	RUS.3	34	7	18	25	48	—	—	—	—	—
2008–09	Khimik Voskresensk	KHL	41	1	5	6	28	—	—	—	—	—
2008–09	MHC Dmitrov	RUS.2	—	—	—	—	—	14	1	2	3	12
2009–10	Gazovik Tyumen	RUS.2	19	0	2	2	16	—	—	—	—	—
2009–10	HC Yugra	RUS.2	4	0	1	1	6	—	—	—	—	—
2009–10	Mechel Chelyabinsk	RUS.2	4	0	0	0	0	8	1	0	1	6
2009–10	Mechel–2 Chelyabinsk	RUS.3	2	0	3	3	0	—	—	—	—	—
2010–11	Krylia Sovetov Moscow	VHL	5	1	0	1	4	—	—	—	—	—
2011–12	Sokol Krasnoyarsk	VHL	48	7	8	15	22	—	—	—	—	—
2012–13	Buran Voronezh	VHL	49	3	12	15	26	16	1	1	2	6
2013–14	Molot–Prikamye Perm	VHL	50	3	19	22	16	15	2	2	4	8
2014–15	HC Lipetsk	VHL	51	5	18	23	24	5	0	0	0	0
2015–16	Molot–Prikamye Perm	VHL	30	1	7	8	14	—	—	—	—	—
2015–16	Kristall Saratov	VHL	11	1	1	2	4	—	—	—	—	—
2016–17	Debreceni Hoki Klub	MOL	12	2	3	5	6	—	—	—	—	—
2016–17	HC Tambov	RUS.3	18	2	7	9	14	8	0	3	3	0
RUS.2 & VHL totals			336	21	71	92	154	58	5	5	10	32
RSL totals			63	0	2	2	32	8	0	1	1	0
