= Vitali Tregubov =

Kazakhstani ice hockey player

- Born: January 28, 1974 (age 51); Oskemen, Kazakh SSR, Soviet Union
- Height: 6 ft 0 in (183 cm)
- Weight: 190 lb (86 kg; 13 st 8 lb)
- Position: Defence
- Shot: Left
- Played for: Torpedo Ust-Kamenogorsk; Severstal Cherepovets; Torpedo Nizhny Novgorod; Amur Khabarovsk; Barys Astana
- National team: Kazakhstan
- Playing career: 1991–2006

Vitali Vladimirovich Tregubov (Russian: Виталий Владимирович Трегубов; born January 28, 1974) is a retired Kazakh professional ice hockey defenceman.

Tregubov played in the Russian Superleague for Torpedo Ust-Kamenogorsk, Severstal Cherepovets, Torpedo Nizhny Novgorod, and Amur Khabarovsk.

He was also a member of the Kazakhstan men's national ice hockey team and played in the 1998 Winter Olympics and the 1998 IIHF World Championship.

== Career statistics ==
=== Regular season and playoffs ===
			Regular season					Playoffs
Season	Team	League	GP	G	A	Pts	PIM	GP	G	A	Pts	PIM
1991–92	ShVSM Ust–Kamenogorsk	CIS.3	50	0	3	3	28	—	—	—	—	—
1992–93	Torpedo–2 Ust–Kamenogorsk	RUS.2	32	1	0	1	18	—	—	—	—	—
1992–93	Torpedo Ust–Kamenogorsk	IHL	—	—	—	—	—	2	0	0	0	2
1993–94	Torpedo Ust–Kamenogorsk	IHL	19	1	0	1	6	—	—	—	—	—
1993–94	Torpedo–2 Ust–Kamenogorsk	RUS.3		1				—	—	—	—	—
1994–95	Torpedo Ust–Kamenogorsk	IHL	44	2	1	3	8	2	0	0	0	2
1995–96	Torpedo Ust–Kamenogorsk	IHL	38	0	3	3	36	—	—	—	—	—
1996–97	Torpedo Ust–Kamenogorsk	RUS.2	34	5	9	14	14	—	—	—	—	—
1996–97	Torpedo–2 Ust–Kamenogorsk	RUS.3	2	1	0	1	0	—	—	—	—	—
1997–98	Severstal Cherepovets	RSL	23	0	0	0	6	—	—	—	—	—
1997–98	Severstal–2 Cherepovets	RUS.3	10	0	0	0	18	—	—	—	—	—
1998–99	Torpedo Ust–Kamenogorsk	RUS.2	29	4	7	11	24	—	—	—	—	—
1998–99	Torpedo Nizhny Novgorod	RUS.2	12	0	2	2	6	—	—	—	—	—
1999–2000	Torpedo Nizhny Novgorod	RSL	15	1	2	3	18	—	—	—	—	—
1999–2000	Torpedo–2 Nizhny Novgorod	RUS.3	1	0	0	0	2	—	—	—	—	—
2000–01	Kazzinc–Torpedo	RUS.3	46	6	17	23	56	—	—	—	—	—
2001–02	Kazzinc–Torpedo	RUS.2	49	2	9	11	52	—	—	—	—	—
2002–03	Kazzinc–Torpedo	RUS.2	38	2	6	8	34	—	—	—	—	—
2003–04	Kazzinc–Torpedo	RUS.2	9	0	1	1	24	—	—	—	—	—
2003–04	Amur Khabarovsk	RSL	10	0	0	0	2	—	—	—	—	—
2003–04	Kazakhmys Karaganda	RUS.2	6	1	1	2	2	—	—	—	—	—
2004–05	Kazzinc–Torpedo	KAZ	16	0	1	1	6	—	—	—	—	—
2004–05	Kazzinc–Torpedo	RUS.2	40	0	1	1	49	—	—	—	—	—
2005–06	Barys Astana	KAZ	15	0	1	1	10	—	—	—	—	—
2005–06	Barys Astana	RUS.3	47	4	11	15	42	—	—	—	—	—
RUS.2 totals			249	15	36	51	223	—	—	—	—	—
IHL & RSL totals			149	4	6	10	76	4	0	0	0	2

=== International ===
Year	Team	Event	GP	G	A	Pts	PIM
1995	Kazakhstan	WC C	4	0	2	2	18
1996	Kazakhstan	WC C	7	0	0	0	2
1997	Kazakhstan	WC B	7	0	1	1	4
1998	Kazakhstan	OG	7	1	0	1	4
1998	Kazakhstan	WC	3	0	1	1	6
1999	Kazakhstan	WC B	7	0	2	2	14
1999	Kazakhstan	WC Q	3	0	0	0	2
2000	Kazakhstan	WC B	7	2	2	4	16
2001	Kazakhstan	WC D1	5	0	3	3	0
2002	Kazakhstan	WC D1	5	0	4	4	6
2003	Kazakhstan	WC D1	5	0	0	0	18
2005	Kazakhstan	OGQ	3	0	0	0	0
Senior totals			63	3	15	18	90
