= 1995–96 Vysshaya Liga season =

Russian ice hockey league season

The 1995–96 Vysshaya Liga season was the fourth season of the Vysshaya Liga, the second level of ice hockey in Russia. 57 teams participated in the first round. SKA Khabarovsk and Dizelist Penza were promoted to the International Hockey League.

== First round ==
=== Central-1 ===
	Club	GP	W	T	L	GF	GA	Pts
1.	CSKA Moscow II	32	19	9	4	138	71	47
2.	Torpedo Yaroslavl II	32	20	6	6	135	70	46
3.	Dynamo Moscow II	32	19	4	9	137	99	42
4.	Motor Zavolzhye	32	15	6	11	128	103	36
5.	Spartak Moscow II	32	14	6	12	112	116	34
6.	Torpedo Nizhny Novgorod II	32	15	4	13	112	102	34
7.	Krylya Sovetov Moscow II	32	8	8	16	100	114	24
8.	Kristall Elektrostal II	32	5	7	20	84	132	17
9.	Zvezda Tver	32	3	2	27	85	224	8

=== Central-2 ===
	Club	GP	W	T	L	GF	GA	Pts
1.	HC Lipetsk	24	20	2	2	119	51	42
2.	Dizelist Penza	24	18	1	5	123	47	37
3.	Buran Voronezh	24	13	4	7	68	64	30
4.	Vyatich Tver	24	8	2	14	75	87	18
5.	Khimik Engels	24	7	2	15	58	94	16
6.	Avangard Tambov	24	6	1	17	52	104	13
7.	Lada Togliatti II	24	5	2	17	52	100	12

=== Northwest ===
	Club	GP	W	T	L	GF	GA	Pts
1.	KomiTEK Nizhny Odes	20	19	0	1	105	41	38
2.	Gornyak Olenegorsk	20	17	0	3	87	30	34
3.	Tekhnolog Ukhta		6	3	11	66	76	15
4.	Severstal Cherepovets II	20	4	5	11	63	77	13
5.	Izhorets St. Petersburg	20	5	1	14	47	111	11
6.	SKA St. Petersburg II	20	3	3	14	42	75	9

=== Volga ===
	Club	GP	W	T	L	GF	GA	Pts
1.	Olimpiya Kirovo-Chepetsk	28	23	1	4	143	75	47
2.	Neftyanik Almetyevsk	28	21	0	7	115	72	42
3.	Ak Bars Kazan II	28	17	0	11	109	79	34
4.	Progress Glazov	28	15	2	11	93	83	32
5.	Rossiya Krasnokamsk	28	14	1	13	107	99	29
6.	Izhstal Izhevsk	28	6	5	17	83	109	17
7.	Nefteckimik Nizhnekamsk II	28	6	2	20	72	138	14
8.	Sokol Novocheboksarsk	28	2	5	21	65	132	9

=== Ural-North ===
	Club	GP	W	T	L	GF	GA	Pts
1.	Kholmogorets Noyabrsk	28	20	2	6	120	55	42
2.	Kedr Novouralsk	28	16	8	4	105	54	40
3.	Metallurg Serov	28	16	8	4	108	71	40
4.	Sputnik Nizhny Tagil	28	16	7	5	106	63	39
5.	SKA-Avto Yekaterinburg	28	7	6	15	83	119	20
6.	Avangard Omsk II	28	5	8	15	74	114	18
7.	Progress Solikamsk	28	6	3	19	63	118	15
8.	Molot Perm II	28	3	4	21	45	110	10

=== Ural-South ===
	Club	GP	W	T	L	GF	GA	Pts
1.	Metallurg Novotroitsk	24	22	1	1	128	44	45
2.	Mechel Chelyabinsk	24	14	5	5	106	46	33
3.	Metallurg Magnitogorsk II	24	10	3	11	71	61	23
4.	UralAZ Miass	24	10	3	11	71	76	23
5.	Nadezhda Chelyabinsk	24	10	3	11	58	79	23
6.	Novoil Ufa	24	7	3	14	64	90	17
7.	Yuzhny Ural Orsk	24	2	0	22	46	148	4

=== Siberia - Far East ===
	Club	GP	W	T	L	GF	GA	Pts
1.	Zapolyarnik Norilsk	40	36	2	2	190	70	74
2.	SKA Khabarovsk	40	35	3	2	232	57	73
3.	Metallurg Achinsk	40	24	5	11	168	114	53
4.	Gornyak Raychikhinsk	40	19	6	15	136	116	44
5.	Ermak Angarsk	40	17	6	17	133	130	40
6.	Shakhtyor Prokopyevsk	40	18	4	18	115	99	40
7.	Yantar Seversk	40	14	7	19	105	99	35
8.	Motor Barnaul	40	14	7	19	102	137	35
9.	Torpedo Ust-Kamenogorsk II	40	12	3	25	151	210	27
10.	Metallurg Novokuznetsk II	40	4	3	33	85	228	11
11.	Energiya Krasnoyarsk	40	2	4	34	79	236	8

== Final round ==
=== Central, Volga, Northwest ===
	Club	GP	W	T	L	GF	GA	Pts
1.	Dizelist Pensa	28	18	2	8	95	56	38
2.	HC Lipetsk	28	15	6	7	101	66	36
3.	Buran Voronezh	28	15	5	8	85	64	35
4.	Neftyanik Almetyevsk	28	12	7	9	97	90	31
5.	KomiTEK Nizhny Odes	28	13	4	11	78	65	30
6.	Olimpiya Kirovo-Chepetsk	28	12	3	13	88	82	27
7.	Gornyak Olenegorsk	28	7	5	16	71	109	19
8.	Progress Glazov	28	2	4	22	56	139	8

=== Ural, West Siberia ===
	Club	GP	W	T	L	GF	GA	Pts
1.	Mechel Chelyabinsk	28	21	0	7	111	61	42
2.	Kedr Novouralsk	28	15	5	8	77	63	35
3.	Metallurg Serov	28	13	3	12	91	80	29
4.	Metallurg Novotroitsk	28	13	3	12	89	91	29
5.	Metallurg Magnitogorsk II	28	10	6	12	69	71	26
6.	Sputnik Nizhny Tagil	28	9	7	12	81	77	25
7.	UralAZ Miass	28	9	5	14	76	97	23
8.	SKA-Avto Yekaterinburg II	28	5	5	18	80	134	15

=== Siberian Far-Eastern ===
==== Playoffs ====
Quarterfinals
1.	Zapolyarnik Norilsk	4
5.	Ermak Angarsk	0
3.	Metallurg Achinsk	2
7.	Yantar Seversk	3
2.	SKA Khabarovsk	4
6.	Shakhtor Prokopyevsk	1
4.	Gornyak Raychikhinsk	3
8.	Motor Barnaul	1

Semifinals
1.	Zapolyarnik Norilsk	4
7.	Yantar Seversk	0
2.	SKA Khabarovsk	5
4.	Gornyak Raychikhinsk	0

Finals
2.	SKA Khabarovsk	3
1.	Zapolyarnik Norilsk	1
Third place
4.	Gornyak Raychikhinsk	3
7.	Yantar Seversk	0

==== Placing round ====
5th-8th place

- Ermak Angarsk - Metallurg Achinsk 3:2, 5:1, 3:2, 4:2, 5:0
- Shakhtyor Prokopyevsk - Motor Barnaul 2:3, 3:0, 2:0, 2:0, 5:0

5th place

- Shakhtor Prokopyevsk - Ermak Angarsk 3:2, 4:2, 5:4

7th place

- Motor Barnaul - Metallurg Achinsk 5:3, 6:4, 2:1

== Promotion round ==
	Club	GP	W	T	L	GF	GA	Pts
1.	SKA Khabarovsk	12	7	2	3	39	34	16
2.	Dizelist Penza	12	7	2	3	33	22	16
3.	Mechel Chelyabinsk	12	4	2	6	27	30	10
4.	HC Lipetsk	12	1	4	7	29	42	6
