= 1996–97 Vysshaya Liga season =

Russian ice hockey league season

The 1996–97 Vysshaya Liga season was the fifth season of the Vysshaya Liga, the second level of ice hockey in Russia. 17 teams participated in the league. CSKA Moscow won the Western Conference, and Metchel Chelyabinsk won the Eastern Conference. UralAZ Miass won the Cup competition.

== First round ==
=== Western Conference ===
	Club	GP	W	T	L	GF	GA	Pts
1.	HC CSKA Moscow	32	24	3	5	143	59	51
2.	HC Lipetsk	32	23	2	7	140	67	48
3.	HC Voronezh	32	20	4	8	112	65	44
4.	Olimpiya Kirovo-Chepetsk	32	19	4	9	115	82	42
5.	Avangard Tambov	32	12	2	18	68	119	26
6.	Motor Zavolzhye	32	10	5	17	75	110	25
7	Izhorets St. Petersburg	32	9	4	19	62	103	22
8.	Khimik Engels	32	7	7	18	74	107	21
9.	Gornyak Olenogorsk	32	3	3	26	50	127	9

=== Eastern Conference ===
	Club	GP	W	T	L	GF	GA	Pts
1.	Mechel Chelyabinsk	28	21	2	5	112	61	44
2.	Torpedo Ust-Kamenogorsk	28	20	1	7	148	77	41
3.	Neftyanik Almetyevsk	28	17	4	7	92	64	38
4.	UralAZ Miass	28	17	2	9	110	63	36
5.	Kedr Novouralsk	28	8	4	16	70	110	20
6.	Progress Glazov	28	6	4	18	52	117	16
7	Izhstal Izhevsk	28	6	3	19	67	116	15
8.	Metallurg Serov	28	6	2	20	66	109	14

== Second round ==
=== Western Conference ===
	Club	GP	W	T	L	GF	GA	Pts
1.	HC Voronezh	52	34	5	13	185	98	73
2.	Olimpiya Kirovo-Chepetsk	52	31	8	13	182	120	70
3.	Motor Zavolzhye	52	16	11	25	129	166	43
4.	Izhorets St. Petersburg	52	16	9	27	115	156	41
5.	Avangard Tambov	52	18	2	32	105	201	38
6.	Khimik Engels	52	12	9	31	106	178	33

=== Eastern Conference ===
	Club	GP	W	T	L	GF	GA	Pts
1.	UralAZ Miass	48	32	4	12	205	116	68
2.	Torpedo Ust-Kamenogorsk	48	32	3	13	217	128	67
3.	Metallurg Serov	48	15	5	28	124	162	35
4.	Kedr Novouralsk	48	15	5	28	119	192	35
5.	Izhstal Izhevsk	48	14	7	27	135	168	35
6.	Progress Glazov	48	8	6	34	99	222	22

=== Cup ===
First round
O1	UralAZ Miass
–
PL	Yantar Seversk	2
O6	Progress Glazov	0
O4	Kedr Novouralsk	0
PL	Progress Solikamsk	2
O3	Metallurg Serov	2
O5	Izhstal Izhevsk	0
W1	HC Voronezh
–
W5	Avangard Tambov	2
W4	Izhorets St. Petersburg	0
PL	Torpedo Nizhny Novgorod II	0
W2	Olimpiya Kirovo-Chepetsk	2
W3	Motor Zavolzhye	2
PL	Lada Togliatti II	1

Quarterfinal
O1	UralAZ Miass	2
PL	Yantar Seversk	0
PL	Progress Solikamsk	2
O3	Metallurg Serov	0
W1	HC Voronezh	2
PL	Avangard Tambov	0
W2	Olimpiya Kirovo-Chepetsk	2
W3	Motor Zavolzhye	0

Semifinal
O1	UralAZ Miass	2
PL	Progress Solikamsk	1
W1	HC Voronezh	2
W2	Olimpiya Kirovo-Chepetsk	0

Final
O1	UralAZ Miass	3
W2	Olimpiya Kirovo-Chepetsk	1
