= 1998–99 FHR season =

The 1998–99 FHR season was the first and only season of the league, organized by the Russian Ice Hockey Federation. It existed alongside the Vysshaya Liga as the second level of ice hockey in Russia in 1998–99. 17 teams participated in the league, and Nosta Yuzhny Novotroitsk-Orsk won the championship.

== First round ==
=== Western Conference ===
	Club	GP	W	T	L	GF	GA	Pts
1.	Motor Zavolzhye	28	23	0	5	140	59	46
2.	Torpedo Yaroslavl 2	28	19	2	7	103	60	40
3.	Spartak St. Petersburg	28	16	2	10	106	77	34
4.	HC Dynamo Moscow 2	28	15	2	11	84	72	32
5.	Avangard Tambov	28	12	1	15	91	98	25
6.	Severstal Cherepovets 2	28	10	1	17	86	97	21
7	Izhorez St. Petersburg	28	8	4	16	62	89	20
8.	Technolog Ukhta	28	2	2	24	57	177	6

=== Eastern Conference ===
	Club	GP	W	T	L	GF	GA	Pts
1.	Izhstal Izhevsk	32	17	8	7	97	63	42
2.	Neftyanik Leninogorsk	32	19	3	10	107	82	41
3.	Torpedo Ust-Kamenogorsk	32	16	7	9	130	95	39
4.	Nosta Yuzhny Novotroitsk-Orsk	32	15	7	10	109	89	37
5.	Metallurg Serov	32	11	9	12	91	110	31
6.	Kedr Novouralsk	32	10	9	13	84	96	29
7	Sputnik Nizhny Tagil	32	10	7	15	89	117	27
8.	Motor Barnaul	32	8	8	16	77	96	24
9.	Olimpiya Kirovo-Chepetsk	32	4	10	18	86	122	18

== Final round ==
	Club	GP	W	T	L	GF	GA	Pts
1.	Nosta Yuzhny Novotroitsk-Orsk	14	11	1	2	63	35	23
2.	Motor Zavolzhye	14	11	0	3	59	27	22
3.	Izhstal Izhevsk	14	10	2	2	67	37	22
4.	Neftyanik Leninogorsk	14	7	1	6	41	38	15
5.	Vityaz Podolsk	14	3	4	7	42	48	10
6.	Spartak St. Petersburg	14	4	2	8	38	48	10
7	Metallurg Serov	14	3	0	11	38	69	6
8.	Avangard Tambov	14	1	2	11	21	67	4

== Placing round (Eastern Conference) ==
	Club	GP	W	T	L	GF	GA	Pts
1.	Torpedo Ust-Kamenogorsk	16	10	1	5	44	34	21
2.	Olimpiya Kirovo-Chepetsk	16	8	3	5	46	43	19
3.	Motor Barnaul	16	8	2	6	39	40	18
4.	Kedr Novouralsk	15	6	4	5	48	49	16
5.	Sputnik Nizhny Tagil	15	0	4	11	29	40	4
