= Mikhail Kravets =

Russian ice hockey player

- Born: November 12, 1963 (age 62) Leningrad, Russian SFSR, Soviet Union
- Height: 5 ft 10 in (178 cm)
- Weight: 194 lb (88 kg; 13 st 12 lb)
- Position: Right wing
- Shot: Left
- Played for: SKA Saint Petersburg; San Jose Sharks
- National team: Russia
- NHL draft: 243rd overall, 1991; San Jose Sharks
- Playing career: 1982–2003

Mikhail Grigorevich Kravets (Russian: Михаил Григорьевич Кравец; born November 12, 1963) is a Russian former professional ice hockey player who played in the Soviet Hockey League and 2 games in the National Hockey League (NHL). He is currently serving as the head coach of Kunlun Red Star of the Kontinental Hockey League (KHL).

He played for the SKA St. Petersburg and San Jose Sharks, as well as a season on loan to the Manitoba Moose from the Detroit Vipers in 1995. In the years he was playing for the Sharks, he played in every game of the season, but in 2000 missed his third season's opening due to being denied a visa to the United States.

During the 2012-13 season, Kravets was named interim head coach from November until December for SKA St. Petersburg before returning to his assistant coaching duties.

== Career statistics ==
			Regular season					Playoffs
Season	Team	League	GP	G	A	Pts	PIM	GP	G	A	Pts	PIM
1982–83	Izhorets Leningrad	Soviet3	62	20	12	32	53	—	—	—	—	—
1983–84	Izhorets Leningrad	Soviet2	60	34	17	51	44	—	—	—	—	—
1984–85	Izhorets Leningrad	Soviet2	52	39	11	50	43	—	—	—	—	—
1985–86	SKA Leningrad	Soviet	38	14	7	21	20	—	—	—	—	—
1986–87	SKA Leningrad	Soviet	36	16	11	27	37	—	—	—	—	—
1987–88	SKA Leningrad	Soviet	44	9	5	14	36	—	—	—	—	—
1988–89	SKA Leningrad	Soviet	43	8	18	26	20	—	—	—	—	—
1989–90	SKA Leningrad	Soviet	29	10	14	24	36	—	—	—	—	—
1990–91	SKA Leningrad	Soviet	25	8	8	16	28	—	—	—	—	—
1991–92	San Jose Sharks	NHL	1	0	0	0	0	—	—	—	—	—
1991–92	Kansas City Blades	IHL	74	10	32	42	172	15	6	8	14	12
1992–93	San Jose Sharks	NHL	1	0	0	0	0	—	—	—	—	—
1992–93	Kansas City Blades	IHL	71	19	49	68	153	10	2	5	7	55
1993–94	Kansas City Blades	IHL	63	14	44	58	171	—	—	—	—	—
1994–95	Detroit Vipers	IHL	7	0	0	0	4	—	—	—	—	—
1990–91	Minnesota Moose	IHL	37	7	15	22	25	—	—	—	—	—
1994–95	Syracuse Crunch	AHL	7	2	2	4	8	—	—	—	—	—
1995–96	Wichita Thunder	CHL	37	14	57	71	89	—	—	—	—	—
1995–96	Milwaukee Admirals	IHL	7	0	1	1	4	—	—	—	—	—
1996–97	Louisiana IceGators	ECHL	57	22	45	67	93	17	4	9	13	18
1997–98	Baton Rouge Kingfish	ECHL	11	2	9	11	37	—	—	—	—	—
1997–98	Louisiana IceGators	ECHL	28	8	18	26	41	—	—	—	—	—
1997–98	New Orleans Brass	ECHL	4	1	0	1	2	—	—	—	—	—
1997–98	Mississippi Sea Wolves	ECHL	10	4	10	14	25	—	—	—	—	—
1998–99	Mississippi Sea Wolves	ECHL	59	17	42	59	136	18	5	8	13	10
1999–00	Arkansas RiverBlades	ECHL	30	10	17	27	64	—	—	—	—	—
1999–00	Mississippi Sea Wolves	ECHL	23	7	20	27	27	7	1	6	7	8
2000–01	SKA St. Petersburg	Russia	8	0	0	0	20	—	—	—	—	—
2000–01	Spartak St. Petersburg	Russia2	18	5	9	14	62	—	—	—	—	—
2001–02	Spartak St. Petersburg	Russia2	51	11	17	28	86	—	—	—	—	—
2002–03	Spartak St. Petersburg	Russia2	8	0	1	1	30	—	—	—	—	—
NHL totals			2	0	0	0	0	—	—	—	—	—
