= 1997–98 Vysshaya Liga season =

Russian ice hockey league season

The 1997–98 Vysshaya Liga season was the sixth season of the Vysshaya Liga, the second level of ice hockey in Russia. 16 teams participated in the league. HC Lipetsk won the Western Conference, and Neftyanik Almetyevsk won the Eastern Conference

== First round ==
=== Western Conference ===
	Club	GP	W	T	L	GF	GA	Pts
1.	HC Lipetsk	24	19	2	3	90	31	40
2.	HC Voronezh	24	15	3	6	87	43	33
3.	Izhorets St. Petersburg	24	13	2	9	52	52	28
4.	Torpedo Yaroslavl II	24	10	5	9	58	55	25
5.	Avangard Tambov	24	5	5	14	49	84	15
6.	Motor Zavolzhye	24	6	3	15	66	81	15
7	Dynamo Moscow II	24	4	4	16	41	97	12

=== Eastern Conference ===
	Club	GP	W	T	L	GF	GA	Pts
1.	Neftyanik Almetyevsk	32	23	4	5	132	66	50
2.	Izhstal Izhevsk	32	23	4	5	127	75	50
3.	UralAZ Miass	32	19	5	8	121	61	43
4.	Torpedo Ust-Kamenogorsk	32	15	3	14	117	118	33
5.	Nosta Yuzhny Ural Novotroitsk-Orsk	32	13	4	15	82	100	30
6.	Olimpiya Kirovo-Chepetsk	32	9	4	19	85	107	22
7	Sputnik Nizhny Tagil	32	7	7	18	74	105	21
8.	Kedr Novouralsk	32	9	3	20	86	119	21
9.	Metallurg Serov	32	6	6	20	83	147	18

== Final round ==
=== Western Conference ===
	Club	GP	W	T	L	GF	GA	Pts
1.	Torpedo Yaroslavl II	36	25	4	7	142	84	54
2.	Motor Zavolzhye	36	23	5	8	127	78	51
3.	Spartak Moscow II	36	21	2	13	107	87	44
4.	Izhorets St. Petersburg	36	20	4	12	102	90	44
5.	CSKA Moscow II	36	17	3	16	116	116	37
6.	THK Tver	36	15	5	16	142	153	35
7.	Avangard Tambov	36	12	4	20	106	101	28
8.	SKA St. Petersburg II	36	10	6	20	69	93	26
9.	Dynamo Moscow II	36	10	5	21	89	126	25
10.	Torpedo Nizhny Novgorod II	36	5	6	25	95	167	16

=== Eastern Conference ===
	Club	GP	W	T	L	GF	GA	Pts
1.	UralAZ Miass	56	39	7	10	236	101	85
2.	Torpedo Ust-Kamenogorsk	56	30	7	19	208	181	67
3.	Nosta Yuzhny Ural Novotroitsk-Orsk	56	23	9	24	144	165	55
4.	Sputnik Nizhny Tagil	56	15	11	30	127	201	41
5.	Metallurg Serov	56	13	12	31	166	237	38
6.	Olimpiya Kirovo-Chepetsk	56	16	5	35	137	187	37
7.	Kedr Novouralsk	56	14	5	37	155	210	33
