= Evgeny Medvedev =

Russian ice hockey player (born 1982)

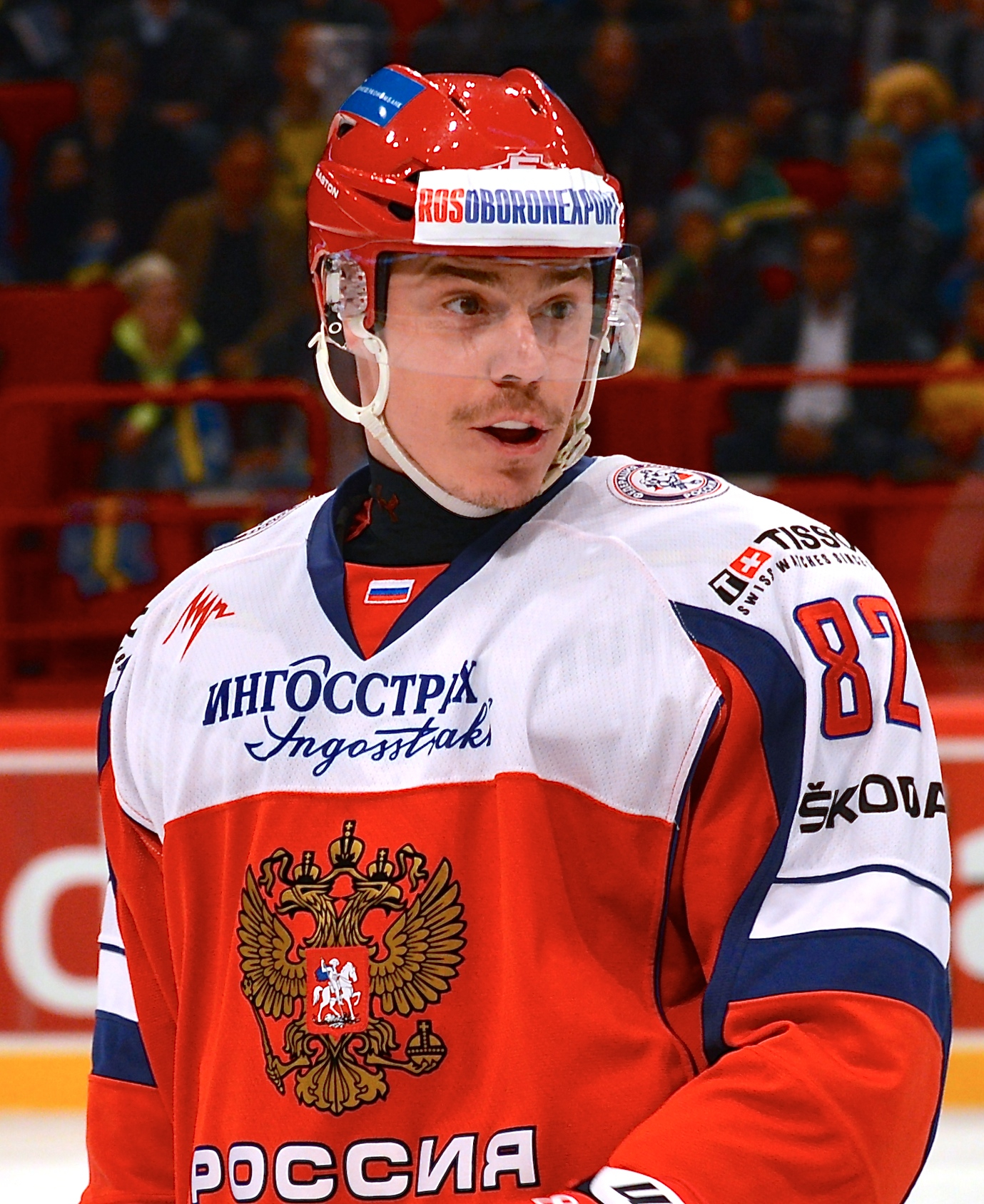
- Born: 27 August 1982 (age 43) Chelyabinsk, Russian SFSR, Soviet Union
- Height: 6 ft 3 in (191 cm)
- Weight: 192 lb (87 kg; 13 st 10 lb)
- Position: Defence
- Shot: Left
- Played for: Mechel Chelyabinsk; Severstal Cherepovets; Ak Bars Kazan; Philadelphia Flyers; Avangard Omsk
- National team: Russia
- NHL draft: Undrafted
- Playing career: 2003–2019

Evgeny Vladimirovich Medvedev (Russian: Евге́ний Влади́мирович Медве́дев; born 27 August 1982) is a Russia former professional ice hockey defenseman. Medvedev is most known for helping Ak Bars Kazan win the first two Gagarin Cups in 2009 and 2010. He also played one season in the National Hockey League for the Philadelphia Flyers.

== Playing career ==
Undrafted in any NHL entry draft, Medvedev played in his native Russia making his first team debut with Mechel Chelyabinsk in the Russian Superleague in 2002. A season before the introduction of the Kontinental Hockey League, Medvedev transferred to Ak Bars Kazan in the 2007–08 season.

Medvedev played eight seasons with Kazan, culminating in two Gagarin Cup championships and three KHL All-Star Appearances, before opting to sign his first NHL contract as a 32-year-old on a one-year deal with the Philadelphia Flyers on 20 May 2015.

After one season in North America, Medvedev returned to Russia by signing a contract with Avangard Omsk.

== Career statistics ==
=== Regular season and playoffs ===
			Regular season					Playoffs
Season	Team	League	GP	G	A	Pts	PIM	GP	G	A	Pts	PIM
1998–99	Mechel–2 Chelyabinsk	RUS.3	9	1	2	3	4	—	—	—	—	—
1999–2000	Mechel–2 Chelyabinsk	RUS.3	1	0	0	0	0	—	—	—	—	—
1999–2000	Traktor–2 Chelyabinsk	RUS.3	11	1	1	2	4	—	—	—	—	—
2000–01	Mechel–2 Chelyabinsk	RUS.3	46	15	7	22	30	—	—	—	—	—
2001–02	Mechel–2 Chelyabinsk	RUS.3	32	7	9	16	50	—	—	—	—	—
2001–02	Zvezda Chebarkul	RUS.4	8	3	4	7	6	—	—	—	—	—
2002–03	Mechel Chelyabinsk	RSL	11	0	0	0	6	—	—	—	—	—
2002–03	Mechel–2 Chelyabinsk	RUS.3	21	6	15	21	18	—	—	—	—	—
2003–04	Mechel–2 Chelyabinsk	RUS.3	15	2	6	8	20	—	—	—	—	—
2003–04	Metallurg Serov	RUS.2	34	7	11	18	24	—	—	—	—	—
2004–05	Mechel Chelyabinsk	RUS.2	44	5	6	11	42	5	1	0	1	8
2004–05	Mechel–2 Chelyabinsk	RUS.3	1	1	0	1	2	—	—	—	—	—
2005–06	Severstal Cherepovets	RSL	49	4	5	9	54	2	0	0	0	6
2006–07	Severstal Cherepovets	RSL	50	10	10	20	115	3	0	0	0	8
2006–07	Severstal–2 Cherepovets	RUS.3	1	0	0	0	6	—	—	—	—	—
2007–08	Ak Bars Kazan	RSL	41	6	20	26	89	8	2	1	3	4
2008–09	Ak Bars Kazan	KHL	48	8	11	19	64	21	2	5	7	32
2009–10	Ak Bars Kazan	KHL	48	2	10	12	40	17	2	3	5	32
2010–11	Ak Bars Kazan	KHL	49	4	16	20	54	9	0	3	3	6
2011–12	Ak Bars Kazan	KHL	45	5	19	24	36	6	0	1	1	6
2012–13	Ak Bars Kazan	KHL	49	6	20	26	44	18	0	7	7	12
2013–14	Ak Bars Kazan	KHL	50	3	21	24	55	5	1	0	1	31
2014–15	Ak Bars Kazan	KHL	43	3	13	16	26	14	1	3	4	12
2015–16	Philadelphia Flyers	NHL	45	4	8	12	34	—	—	—	—	—
2016–17	Avangard Omsk	KHL	56	2	20	22	36	12	2	6	8	6
2017–18	Avangard Omsk	KHL	54	11	19	30	34	7	1	1	2	8
2018–19	Avangard Omsk	KHL	62	8	22	30	22	11	0	1	1	16
RSL totals			151	20	35	55	264	13	2	1	3	18
KHL totals			504	52	171	223	411	120	9	30	39	161
NHL totals			45	4	8	12	34	—	—	—	—	—

=== International ===
Medal record

Representing Russia

Ice hockey

World Championships
Gold medal – first place	2012 Finland/Sweden	
Gold medal – first place	2014 Belarus	
Silver medal – second place	2015 Czech Republic	

Year	Team	Event	Result	GP	G	A	Pts	PIM
2012	Russia	WC	1st place, gold medalist(s)	10	1	3	4	4
2013	Russia	WC	6th	8	2	5	7	6
2014	Russia	OG	5th	5	0	1	1	2
2014	Russia	WC	1st place, gold medalist(s)	10	0	4	4	6
2015	Russia	WC	2nd place, silver medalist(s)	7	0	3	3	6
Senior totals				40	3	16	19	24
