= 2003–04 Vysshaya Liga season =

Russian ice hockey league season

The 2003–04 Vysshaya Liga season was the 12th season of the Vysshaya Liga, the second level of ice hockey in Russia. 30 teams participated in the league. Spartak Moscow and Molot-Prikamie Perm were promoted to the Russian Superleague.

== First round ==
=== Western Conference ===
	Club	GP	W	OTW	T	OTL	L	GF	GA	Diff.	Pts
1.	Spartak Moscow	60	53	1	4	0	2	258	87	171	165
2.	Neftyanik Almetyevsk	60	44	2	5	2	7	215	118	97	143
3.	Vityaz Podolsk	60	35	0	11	1	13	171	120	51	117
4.	Neftyanik Leninogorsk	60	31	1	9	3	16	174	127	47	107
5.	Izhstal Izhevsk	60	25	2	10	4	19	142	129	13	93
6.	Krylya Sovetov Moscow	60	25	6	2	2	25	138	133	5	91
7.	Kristall Saratov	60	25	1	11	1	22	129	111	18	89
8.	Dizel Penza	60	26	1	6	2	25	165	169	−4	88
9.	HK Lipetsk	60	23	1	3	1	32	121	151	−30	75
10.	THK Tver	60	20	1	13	0	26	110	137	−27	75
11.	Olimpiya Kirovo-Chepetsk	60	20	1	9	1	29	125	130	−5	72
12.	CSK VVS Samara	60	18	1	10	2	29	147	167	−20	68
13.	HC Voronezh	60	16	3	6	2	33	147	201	−54	62
14.	Spartak St. Petersburg	60	14	0	7	2	37	120	203	−83	51
15.	Kristall Elektrostal	60	11	2	9	2	36	105	192	−87	48
16.	HC Rybinsk	60	9	2	5	0	44	92	184	−92	36

=== Eastern Conference ===
	Club	GP	W	OTW	T	OTL	L	GF	GA	Diff.	Pts
1.	Molot-Prikamie Perm	52	38	1	2	0	11	204	92	112	118
2.	Mechel Chelyabinsk	52	31	1	5	1	14	159	108	51	101
3.	Traktor Chelyabinsk	52	30	1	3	1	17	134	105	29	96
4.	Kazzinc-Torpedo	52	29	2	4	1	16	162	115	47	96
5.	Sputnik Nizhny Tagil	52	28	2	4	1	17	151	110	41	93
6.	Energija Kemerovo	52	29	0	4	1	18	139	115	24	92
7.	Gazovik Tyumen	52	24	0	4	0	24	133	135	−2	76
8.	Motor Barnaul	52	23	1	4	1	23	127	146	−19	76
9.	Zauralie Kurgan	52	20	3	7	1	21	142	136	6	74
10.	Kedr Novouralsk	52	20	2	6	2	22	139	139	0	72
11.	Yuzhny Ural Orsk	52	15	0	2	1	34	118	187	−69	48
12.	Kazakhmys Karaganda	52	12	1	5	0	34	83	165	−82	43
13.	Metallurg Serov	52	11	0	5	1	35	123	199	−76	39
14.	Dinamo-Energija Yekaterinburg	52	11	0	3	3	35	121	183	−62	39

== Playoffs ==
First round
W1	Spartak Moscow	3
O9	Zauralie Kurgan	1
W5	Izhstal Izhevsk	2
O5	Sputnik Nizhny Tagil	3
O2	Mechel Chelyabinsk	3
W7	Kristall Saratov	1
W3	Vityaz Podolsk	3
O7	Gazovik Tyumen	1
O1	Molot-Prikamie Perm	3
W8	Dizel Penza	1
W4	Neftyanik Leninogorsk	0
O6	Energija Kemerovo	3
W2	Neftyanik Almetyevsk	3
O8	Motor Barnaul	0
O3	Traktor Chelyabinsk	3
W6	Krylya Sovetov Moscow	1

Quarterfinals
W1	Spartak Moscow	3
O5	Sputnik Nizhny Tagil	0
O2	Mechel Chelyabinsk	3
W3	Vityaz Podolsk	0
O1	Molot-Prikamie Perm	3
O6	Energija Kemerovo	0
W2	Neftyanik Almetyevsk	2
O3	Traktor Chelyabinsk	3

Semifinals
W1	Spartak Moscow	3
O2	Mechel Chelyabinsk	0
O1	Molot-Prikamie Perm	3
O3	Traktor Chelyabinsk	1

Final
W1	Spartak Moscow	0
O1	Molot-Prikamie Perm	3
