= 2005–06 Vysshaya Liga season =

Russian ice hockey league season

The 2005–06 Vysshaya Liga season was the 14th season of the Vysshaya Liga, the second level of ice hockey in Russia. 28 teams participated in the league. Traktor Chelyabinsk, Krylya Sovetov Moscow, and Amur Khabarovsk were promoted to the Russian Superleague.

== First round ==
=== Western Conference ===
	Club	GP	W	OTW	T	OTL	L	GF	GA	Pts
1.	Krylya Sovetov Moscow	56	37	3	3	0	13	198	118	120
2.	Dizel Penza	56	36	1	4	2	13	168	103	116
3.	Neftyanik Almetyevsk	56	34	2	4	1	15	177	110	111
4.	Khimik Voskresensk	56	32	3	6	1	14	160	112	109
5.	Torpedo Nizhny Novgorod	56	31	3	7	1	14	160	83	107
6.	HC Dmitrov	56	28	1	8	2	17	165	119	96
7.	HC Lipetsk	56	25	0	8	3	20	127	118	86
8.	Neftyanik Leninogorsk	56	23	2	5	0	26	140	145	78
9.	Izhstal Izhevsk	56	22	1	10	0	23	114	110	78
10.	Kristall Saratov	56	21	1	7	2	25	116	139	74
11.	HC Belgorod	56	17	1	8	4	26	119	147	65
12.	Kapitan Stupino	56	15	3	5	1	32	119	196	57
13.	CSK VVS Samara	56	15	0	4	2	35	114	173	51
14.	Spartak St. Petersburg	56	8	2	7	2	37	108	204	37
15.	Olimpiya Kirovo-Chepetsk	56	6	1	6	3	40	77	185	29

=== Eastern Conference ===
	Club	GP	W	OTW	T	OTL	L	GF	GA	Pts
1.	Traktor Chelyabinsk	48	35	0	6	3	4	172	66	114
2.	Amur Khabarovsk	48	31	1	1	1	14	126	62	97
3.	Kazakhmys Karaganda	48	25	4	7	0	12	139	114	90
4.	Sputnik Nizhny Tagil	48	27	0	4	0	17	141	96	85
5.	Mechel Chelyabinsk	48	26	1	1	1	19	143	113	82
6.	Motor Barnaul	48	18	6	8	0	16	128	131	74
7.	Energija Kemerovo	48	18	3	7	2	18	123	118	69
8.	Kazzinc-Torpedo	48	18	3	4	2	21	134	148	66
9.	Gazovik Tyumen	48	16	1	5	1	25	100	147	56
10.	Metallurg Serov	48	15	2	3	2	26	115	145	54
11.	Zauralie Kurgan	48	13	0	5	1	29	109	150	45
12.	Yuzhny Ural Orsk	48	11	0	5	7	25	96	150	45
13.	Dinamo-Energija Yekaterinburg	48	6	1	6	2	33	117	203	28

== Playoffs ==
First round
W1	Krylya Sovetov Moscow	3
E10	Metallurg Serov	2
W5	Torpedo Nizhny Novgorod	3
E5	HC Mechel Chelyabinsk	1
E2	Amur Khabarovsk	3
W7	HK Lipetsk	0
W3	Neftyanik Almetyevsk	3
E7	Energija Kemerovo	2
E1	HC Traktor Chelyabinsk	3
W8	Neftyanik Leninogorsk	0
W4	Khimik Voskresensk	3
E6	Motor Barnaul	0
W2	Dizel Penza	3
E9	Gazovik Tyumen	0
E4	Sputnik Nizhny Tagil	3
W6	HK Dmitrov	1

Quarterfinals
W1	Krylya Sovetov Moscow	3
W5	Torpedo Nizhny Novgorod	1
E2	Amur Khabarovsk	3
W3	Neftyanik Almetyevsk	0
E1	HC Traktor Chelyabinsk	3
W4	Khimik Voskresensk	1
W2	Dizel Penza	3
E4	Sputnik Nizhny Tagil	2

Semifinals
W1	Krylya Sovetov Moscow	3
E2	Amur Khabarovsk	0
E1	HC Traktor Chelyabinsk	3
W2	Dizel Penza	0

Final
W1	Krylya Sovetov Moscow	2
E1	HC Traktor Chelyabinsk	3

=== 3rd place ===
- (W2) Dizel Penza – (E2) Amur Khabarovsk 1:1, 1:4
