= 2000–01 Vysshaya Liga season =

Russian ice hockey league season

The 2000–01 Vysshaya Liga season was the ninth season of the Vysshaya Liga, the second level of ice hockey in Russia. 25 teams participated in the league, and HC Spartak Moscow and Krylya Sovetov Moscow earned the opportunity to be promoted to the Russian Superleague.

== First round ==
=== Western Conference ===
	Club	GP	W	OTW	T	OTL	L	GF	GA	Pts
1.	Spartak Moscow	44	30	3	5	1	5	207	94	102
2.	Krylya Sovetov Moscow	44	30	3	5	0	6	198	88	101
3.	Kristall Saratov	44	21	6	5	1	11	152	108	81
4.	Khimik Voskresensk	44	23	1	7	2	11	131	110	80
5.	HC Lipetsk	44	24	0	4	1	15	122	105	77
6.	HC CSKA Moscow	44	17	1	6	2	18	144	129	61
7.	Motor Zavolzhye	44	13	1	13	0	17	103	121	54
8.	Elemash Elektrostal	44	15	0	4	2	23	96	149	51
9.	HC Voronezh	44	13	1	6	2	22	117	139	49
10.	THK Tver	44	12	1	5	3	23	102	154	46
11.	Spartak St. Petersburg	44	6	1	6	2	29	84	178	28
12.	Dizelist Penza	44	7	0	4	2	31	74	155	27

=== Eastern Conference ===
	Club	GP	W	OTW	T	OTL	L	GF	GA	Pts
1.	Sibir Novosibirsk	48	38	1	0	0	9	204	105	116
2.	Neftyanik Almetyevsk	48	29	2	5	2	10	174	97	98
3.	Energija Kemerovo	48	27	4	4	1	12	136	98	94
4.	Traktor Chelyabinsk	48	27	1	4	1	15	140	104	88
5.	Rubin Tyumen	48	24	1	7	1	15	141	128	82
6.	Metallurg Serov	48	23	1	4	0	20	137	127	75
7.	Izhstal Izhevsk	48	20	3	4	3	18	132	116	73
8.	Kedr Novouralsk	48	18	1	8	1	20	132	142	65
9.	CSK VVS Samara	48	17	1	6	5	19	115	121	64
10.	Motor Barnaul	48	14	1	1	3	29	113	158	48
11.	Neftyanik Leninogorsk	48	12	2	6	0	28	97	144	46
12.	Yuzhny Ural Orsk	48	9	2	5	2	30	108	179	38
13.	Sputnik Nizhny Tagil	48	5	0	4	1	38	103	213	20

== Final round ==
	Club	GP	W	OTW	T	OTL	L	GF	GA	Pts
1.	Spartak Moscow	14	13	0	0	0	1	67	31	39
2.	Krylya Sovetov Moscow	14	11	0	2	0	1	58	25	35
3.	Sibir Novosibirsk	14	8	1	1	0	4	61	36	27
4.	Neftyanik Almetyevsk	14	8	1	1	0	4	36	27	27
5.	Energija Kemerovo	14	4	0	0	0	10	43	55	12
6.	Kristall Saratov	14	3	0	1	1	9	25	57	11
7.	Traktor Chelyabinsk	14	3	0	1	0	10	30	60	10
8.	Khimik Voskresensk	14	2	0	3	0	9	33	58	9
