= Vyacheslav Tryasunov =

- Born: June 24, 1985 (age 39); Slavgorod, Altai Krai, RSFSR, Soviet Union
- Position: Defence
- Shoots: Right
- KHL team Former teams: Barys Astana; Motor Barnaul; Kazakhmys Satpaev; Sokol Krasnoyarsk; Metallurg Serov; Beibarys Atyrau; Yertis Pavlodar
- National team: Kazakhstan
- NHL draft: Undrafted
- Playing career: 2001–present

Vyacheslav Konstantinovich Tryasunov (Kazakh: Вячеслав Константинович Трясунов; born June 24, 1985) is a Kazakhstani-Russian professional ice hockey defenceman who currently plays for Barys Astana of the KHL.

== Career ==
Vyacheslav Tryasunov began his career as an ice hockey player in the youth of engine Barnaul for whose second team he gave his debut in the Russian Hockey First League, the third-highest game class of the country in the season 2001/02. Then from 2003 he was used in the first team of the club in the Russian Major League. After he played league in 2005 with the Kazakhmys Satpaev from Kazakhstan Hockey Championship he still changed during the current playing time to the league competitor Sokol Krasnoyarsk. Afterwards three years followed with Metallurg Serov in Russian Major League. When this put in 2009 the game company, finally Tryasunov changed to Kazakhstan and joined to Beibarys Atyrau with which he became 2011 and 2012 Kazakhstan champions. In 2010 when he was a runner-up with the club, he was the best pass giver among the defensive players of the league. After five years in Atyrau he changed in 2014 for one to the Yertis Pavlodar with which he became a Kazakhstan champion once more. In 2015 he was obliged by the KHL team Barys Astana.

== Achievements ==
- 2010 - Champion of Kazakhstan with Beibarys Atyrau.
- 2011 - Champion of Kazakhstan with Beibarys Atyrau.
- 2015 - Champion of Kazakhstan with the Yertis Pavlodar.
- In 2015 promotion in the top division with the world championship of the division I, group A.
