= 2002–03 Vysshaya Liga season =

Russian ice hockey league season

The 2002–03 Vysshaya Liga season was the 11th season of the Vysshaya Liga, the second level of ice hockey in Russia. 27 teams participated in the league, and Torpedo Nizhny Novgorod and Khimik Voskresensk were promoted to the Russian Superleague.

== First round ==
=== Western Conference ===
	Club	GP	W	OTW	T	OTL	L	GF	GA	Diff.	Pts
1.	Torpedo Nizhny Novgorod	48	35	3	4	2	4	187	86	+101	117
2.	Khimik Voskresensk	48	32	1	5	1	9	167	81	+86	104
3.	Neftyanik Leninogorsk	48	31	2	1	0	14	149	110	+39	98
4.	Neftyanik Almetyevsk	48	28	3	5	1	11	140	86	+54	96
5.	HC Lipetsk	48	22	0	5	2	19	134	116	+18	73
6.	CSK VVS Samara	48	16	3	6	0	23	139	142	−3	60
7.	Kristall Saratov	48	14	2	6	5	21	118	148	−30	57
8.	Elemash Elektrostal	48	15	2	4	2	25	121	155	−34	55
9.	Vityaz Podolsk	48	15	1	5	3	24	129	167	−38	55
10.	Olimpiya Kirovo-Chepetsk	48	13	3	6	4	22	101	142	−41	55
11.	HC Voronezh	48	13	5	2	3	25	115	140	−25	54
12.	THK Tver	48	13	1	6	0	28	99	151	−52	47
13.	Spartak St. Petersburg	48	10	1	1	4	32	108	183	−75	37

=== Eastern Conference ===
	Club	GP	W	OTW	T	OTL	L	GF	GA	Diff.	Pts
1.	Energija Kemerovo	52	34	1	6	0	11	164	90	74	110
2.	Kazzinc-Torpedo	52	32	1	6	1	12	174	111	63	105
3.	Mostovik Kurgan	52	28	1	9	1	13	177	120	57	96
4.	Gazovik Tyumen	52	28	3	5	1	15	158	105	53	96
5.	Sputnik Nizhny Tagil	52	28	1	6	1	16	139	116	23	93
6.	Izhstal Izhevsk	52	27	1	8	0	16	157	129	28	91
7.	Metallurg Serov	52	24	0	6	2	20	167	160	7	80
8.	Traktor Chelyabinsk	52	20	2	9	1	20	115	108	7	74
9.	Kedr Novouralsk	52	21	1	4	1	25	143	147	−4	70
10.	Dinamo-Energija Yekaterinburg	52	15	1	13	1	22	126	126	0	61
11.	Yantar Seversk	52	15	0	8	1	28	113	159	−46	54
12.	Motor Barnaul	52	15	0	7	2	28	118	153	−35	54
13.	Yuzhny Ural Orsk	52	12	0	3	1	36	102	183	−81	40
14.	Shakhtyor Prokopyevsk	52	3	1	8	0	40	81	227	−146	19

== Final round ==
	Club	GP	W	OTW	T	OTL	L	GF	GA	Diff.	Pts
1.	Torpedo Nizhny Novgorod	14	10	0	3	0	1	42	22	20	33
2.	Khimik Voskresensk	14	10	0	1	1	2	51	23	28	32
3.	Gazovik Tyumen	14	8	0	2	0	4	36	34	2	26
4.	Neftyanik Almetyevsk	14	7	1	3	0	3	38	26	12	26
5.	Energija Kemerovo	14	4	0	2	1	7	31	40	−9	15
6.	Neftyanik Leninogorsk	14	3	1	0	0	10	37	49	−12	11
7.	Mostovik Kurgan	14	3	0	1	0	10	34	55	−21	10
8.	Sputnik Nizhny Tagil	14	2	1	0	1	10	22	42	−20	9
