= 2006–07 Vysshaya Liga season =

Russian ice hockey league season

The 2006–07 Vysshaya Liga season was the 15th season of the Vysshaya Liga, the second level of ice hockey in Russia. 29 teams participated in the league. Torpedo Nizhny Novgorod was promoted to the Russian Superleague.

== First round ==
=== Eastern Conference ===
	Club	GP	W	OTW	T	OTL	L	GF	GA	Pts
1.	Torpedo Nizhny Novgorod	52	42	0	6	0	4	259	91	132
2.	Khimik Voskresensk	52	35	2	7	1	7	197	103	117
3.	HK Dmitrov	52	33	2	4	1	12	177	121	108
4.	Neftyanik Almetyevsk	52	30	3	10	1	8	164	93	107
5.	Dizel Penza	52	26	0	7	3	16	149	137	88
6.	HC Belgorod	52	24	2	4	3	19	155	156	83
7.	Kristall Saratov	52	22	0	9	1	20	125	118	74
8.	CSK VVS Samara	52	20	3	4	1	24	120	143	71
9.	Neftyanik Leninogorsk	52	21	0	4	2	25	120	138	69
10.	Titan Klin	52	19	0	5	0	28	139	172	62
11.	Kristall Elektrostal	52	13	1	7	3	28	115	173	51
12.	Olimpiya Kirovo-Chepetsk	52	11	1	5	1	33	101	188	43
13.	Kapitan Stupino	52	5	2	8	1	36	112	207	28
14.	Spartak St. Petersburg	52	2	2	4	1	43	72	165	15

=== Western Conference ===
	Club	GP	W	OTW	T	OTL	L	GF	GA	Pts
1.	Izhstal Izhevsk	56	31	3	8	3	11	151	93	110
2.	Avtomobilist Yekaterinburg	56	33	2	4	2	15	184	136	109
3.	Kazakhmys Satpaev	56	31	2	6	2	15	184	129	105
4.	Kazzinc-Torpedo	56	30	0	9	2	15	199	141	101
5.	Zauralie Kurgan	56	31	1	4	1	19	150	137	100
6.	Sputnik Nizhny Tagil	56	29	2	7	1	17	158	117	99
7.	Molot-Prikamie Perm	56	27	0	5	1	23	158	132	87
8.	Metallurg Serov	56	25	1	7	1	22	155	142	85
9.	Mechel Chelyabinsk	56	22	4	5	2	23	168	154	81
10.	Gazovik Tyumen	56	23	2	5	3	23	165	152	81
11.	Dinamo-Energija Yekaterinburg	56	23	2	6	1	24	158	165	80
12.	Toros Neftekamsk	56	19	2	8	1	26	154	182	70
13.	Ariada-Akpars Volzhsk	56	18	1	6	1	30	145	170	63
14.	Energija Kemerovo	56	6	2	3	1	44	121	250	26
15.	Yuzhny Ural Orsk	56	5	0	3	2	46	85	235	20

== Playoffs ==
First round
W1	Torpedo Nizhny Novgorod	3
E10	Gazovik Tyumen	0
W5	Dizel Penza	3
E6	Sputnik Nizhny Tagil	1
E2	Avtomobilist Yekaterinburg	3
W7	Kristall Saratov	0
W3	HK Dmitrov	3
E8	Metallurg Serov	1
E1	Izhstal Izhevsk	3
W8	CSK VVS Samara	0
W4	Neftyanik Almetyevsk	1
E7	Molot-Prikamie Perm	3
W2	Khimik Voskresensk	3
E9	HC Mechel Chelyabinsk	1
E5	Zauralie Kurgan	1
W6	HC Belgorod	3

Quarterfinals
W1	Torpedo Nizhny Novgorod	3
W5	Dizel Penza	0
E2	Avtomobilist Yekaterinburg	1
W3	HC Dmitrov	3
E1	Izhstal Izhevsk	3
E7	Molot-Prikamie Perm	2
W2	Khimik Voskresensk	3
W6	HC Belgorod	0

Semifinals
W1	Torpedo Nizhny Novgorod	3
W3	HC Dmitrov	1
E1	Izhstal Izhevsk	0
W2	Khimik Voskresensk	3

Final
W1	Torpedo Nizhny Novgorod	3
W2	Khimik Voskresensk	1

=== 3rd place ===
- (W2) HC Dmitrov – (E2) Izhstal Izhevsk 2:2, 2:1 SO
