= 1947–48 Klass B season =

The 1947–48 Klass B season was the first season of the Klass B, the second level of ice hockey in the Soviet Union. Fifteen teams participated in the league, and Dzerzchinez Chelyabinsk won the championship and was promoted to the Soviet Championship League.

== First round ==
=== Central Zone ===
	Club	GP	W	T	L	GF	GA	Pts
1.	Burevestnik Moscow	14	13	0	1	82	18	26
2.	SKIF Leningrad	14	11	0	3	106	20	22
3.	Spartak Leningrad	14	11	0	3	58	27	22
4.	Lokomotiv Moscow	14	7	0	7	65	92	14
5.	Daugava Riga	14	6	0	8	47	63	12
6.	Savod GOMS Leningrad	14	5	0	9	41	72	10
7.	Lokomotiv Kharkiv	14	2	1	11	31	73	5
8.	Torpedo Minsk	14	0	1	13	18	83	1

=== Eastern Zone ===
	Club	GP	W	T	L	GF	GA	Pts
1.	Dynamo Sverdlovsk	12	11	1	0	122	16	23
2.	Dzerzchinez Chelyabinsk	12	10	0	2	100	31	20
3.	Dynamo Moscowskaya Oblast	12	7	0	5	57	36	14
4.	Torpedo Gorky	12	4	2	6	40	60	10
5.	Dynamo Kuibyshev	12	3	2	7	28	69	8
6.	Lokomotiv Vologda	12	2	1	9	27	117	5
7.	Lokomotiv Archangelsk	12	1	2	9	20	65	4

== Final tournament ==
	Club	GP	W	T	L	GF	GA	Pts
1.	Dzerzchinez Chelyabinsk	3	2	0	1	12	9	4
2.	SKIF Leningrad	3	2	0	1	11	9	4
3.	Dynamo Sverdlovsk	3	2	0	1	14	14	4
4.	Burevestnik Moscow	3	0	0	3	14	19	0
