= Devyatkin =

Devyatkin (Russian: Дeвяткин) is a Russian masculine surname, its feminine counterpart is Devyatkina. It may refer to

- Dimitri Devyatkin (born 1949), American video artist, public speaker, journalist, musician and writer
- Pyotr Devyatkin (1977–2016), Russian-Kazakhstani ice hockey player
