= Kirill Sviyazov =

Russian ice hockey player

- Born: October 23, 1992 (age 32); Moscow, Russia
- Height: 6 ft 0 in (183 cm)
- Weight: 207 lb (94 kg; 14 st 11 lb)
- Position: Defence
- Shoots: Left
- KHL team (P) Cur. team Former teams: Severstal Cherepovets; Izhstal Izhevsk (VHL); HC Lada Togliatti
- Playing career: 2012–present

Kirill Sviyazov (born October 23, 1992) is a Russian professional ice hockey defenceman. He is currently playing with Izhstal Izhevsk in the Supreme Hockey League (VHL) on loan from Severstal Cherepovets of the Kontinental Hockey League (KHL).

Sviyazov made his Kontinental Hockey League debut playing with Severstal Cherepovets during the 2012–13 KHL season.
