= HC CSKA Moscow (1996–2002) =

HC CSKA
- City: Moscow, Russia
- League: Russian Superleague; Vysshaya Liga
- Founded: 1996
- Colours: Red, white

Franchise history
- 1996-2002: HC CSKA

HC CSKA (Russian: ХК ЦСКА) was an ice hockey team in Moscow. It existed alongside the other HC CSKA Moscow club from 1996 to 2002.

== History ==
The club was founded on May 14, 1996, by Viktor Tikhonov after he was fired as head coach of HC CSKA Moscow.

The club was promoted to the Russian Superleague following the 2001-02 season. They finished in 17th place in the Superleague the same year and was set to be relegated to the Vysshaya Liga. The club was then disbanded in August 2002 and HC CSKA Moscow took the place of Tikhonov's club in the Superleague.

== Results ==
Season	League	Pl.	GP	W	OTW	T	OTL	L	GF	GA	Pts
1996-97	Superliga	13	38	12	−	10	−	16	83	104	34
1997-98	Superliga	24	26	6	−	3	−	17	44	82	15
1998-99	Vysshaya Liga	5	36	19	−	3	−	14	153	87	41
1999-2000	Vysshaya Liga	6	44	21	1	3	0	19	198	147	68
2000-01	Vysshaya Liga	6	44	17	1	6	2	19	144	129	61
2001-02	Vysshaya Liga, West	1	56	39	1	4	2	10	259	116	125
