= 2001–02 Vysshaya Liga season =

Russian ice hockey league season

The 2001–02 Vysshaya Liga season was the 10th season of the Vysshaya Liga, the second level of ice hockey in Russia. 30 teams participated in the league, and HC CSKA Moscow and HC Sibir Novosibirsk were promoted to the Russian Superleague.

== First round ==
=== Western Conference ===
	Club	GP	W	OTW	T	OTL	L	GF	GA	Pts
1.	HC CSKA Moscow	56	39	1	4	2	10	259	116	125
2.	Vityaz Podolsk	56	39	1	6	0	10	199	92	125
3.	Khimik Voskresensk	56	39	0	3	2	12	202	128	122
4.	HC Lipetsk	56	38	1	3	2	12	190	103	121
5.	Neftyanik Almetyevsk	56	37	3	1	2	13	185	109	120
6.	CSK VVS Samara	56	27	4	5	1	19	149	136	95
7.	Kristall Saratov	56	27	2	6	2	19	174	129	93
8.	Motor Zavolzhye	56	25	1	8	1	21	167	155	86
9.	Neftyanik Leninogorsk	56	22	2	7	1	24	150	158	78
10.	HC Voronezh	56	21	1	3	0	29	141	184	68
11.	Dizelist Penza	56	11	1	0	1	36	91	194	44
12.	Elemash Elektrostal	56	12	0	4	1	39	119	209	41
13.	THK Tver	56	10	0	8	1	37	115	198	39
14.	Olimpiya Kirovo-Chepetsk	56	8	1	4	5	38	98	206	35
15.	Spartak St. Petersburg	56	6	4	5	0	41	119	241	31

=== Eastern Conference ===
	Club	GP	W	OTW	T	OTL	L	GF	GA	Pts
1.	Sibir Novosibirsk	56	42	2	2	0	10	259	113	132
2.	Gazovik Tyumen	56	35	2	7	0	12	210	138	116
3.	Kazzinc-Torpedo Ust-Kamenogorsk	56	36	2	4	0	14	258	175	116
4.	Dinamo-Energija Yekaterinburg	56	33	0	2	3	18	157	141	104
5.	Energija Kemerovo	56	31	1	4	0	20	179	138	99
6.	Sputnik Nizhny Tagil	56	26	0	8	2	20	151	138	88
7.	Izhstal Izhevsk	56	23	2	6	3	22	161	154	82
8.	Metallurg Serov	56	23	1	6	3	23	169	186	80
9.	Traktor Chelyabinsk	56	19	7	2	2	26	161	170	75
10.	Motor Barnaul	56	21	1	8	2	24	142	150	75
11.	Yuzhny Ural Orsk	56	18	1	7	2	28	115	173	65
12.	Mostovik Kurgan	56	19	1	2	2	32	151	207	63
13.	Kedr Novouralsk	56	11	1	9	1	34	122	181	45
14.	Yantar Seversk	56	9	1	8	3	35	106	198	40
15.	Shakhtyor Prokopyevsk	56	9	2	7	1	37	116	195	39

== Final round ==
	Club	GP	W	OTW	T	OTL	L	GF	GA	Pts
1.	Sibir Novosibirsk	14	10	0	2	0	2	54	29	32
2.	HC CSKA Moscow	14	10	0	2	0	2	66	37	32
3.	Vityaz Podolsk	14	7	1	2	0	4	30	25	25
4.	Khimik Voskresensk	14	7	0	1	1	5	50	43	23
5.	Gazovik Tyumen	14	4	1	0	2	7	33	52	16
6.	HC Lipetsk	14	4	1	0	0	9	31	49	14
7.	Dinamo-Energija Yekaterinburg	14	4	0	0	1	9	33	45	13
8.	Energija Kemerovo	14	2	1	1	0	10	31	48	9
