= 2004–05 Vysshaya Liga season =

Russian ice hockey league season

The 2004–05 Vysshaya Liga season was the 13th season of the Vysshaya Liga, the second level of ice hockey in Russia. 28 teams participated in the league. MVD Tver and Vityaz Chekhov were promoted to the Russian Superleague.

== First round ==
=== Western Conference ===
	Club	GP	W	OTW	T	OTL	L	GF	GA	Pts
1.	HC MVD Tver	52	38	0	7	0	7	147	76	121
2.	Torpedo Nizhny Novgorod	52	37	1	5	1	8	163	69	119
3.	Neftyanik Almetyevsk	52	35	0	5	0	12	168	85	110
4.	Vityaz Chekhov	52	32	1	3	2	14	154	113	103
5.	Kristall Saratov	52	30	2	2	0	18	143	108	96
6.	Neftyanik Leninogorsk	52	30	1	3	0	18	137	99	95
7.	Krylya Sovetov Moscow	52	25	1	7	1	18	150	123	85
8.	Dizel Penza	52	25	0	4	1	22	145	120	80
9.	CSK VVS Samara	52	18	0	2	2	30	102	127	58
10.	HK Lipetsk	52	15	3	4	1	29	102	139	56
11.	HC Belgorod	52	10	3	1	3	35	96	173	40
12.	Spartak St. Petersburg	52	11	0	5	0	36	103	165	38
13.	Kristall Elektrostal	52	11	0	2	1	38	104	208	36
14.	Olimpiya Kirovo-Chepetsk	52	7	1	4	1	39	81	190	28

=== Eastern Conference ===
	Club	GP	W	OTW	T	OTL	L	GF	GA	Pts
1.	Mechel Chelyabinsk	52	35	1	6	0	10	166	98	113
2.	Amur Khabarovsk	52	34	1	7	1	9	159	75	112
3.	Traktor Chelyabinsk	52	34	0	5	1	12	168	88	108
4.	Kazzinc-Torpedo	52	33	1	3	0	15	157	95	104
5.	Sputnik Nizhny Tagil	52	29	0	8	0	15	146	105	95
6.	Kazakhmys Karaganda	52	28	1	6	0	17	167	119	92
7.	Gazovik Tyumen	52	20	0	8	3	21	106	105	71
8.	Energija Kemerovo	52	18	3	6	2	23	108	115	68
9.	Izhstal Izhevsk	52	16	4	11	0	21	110	127	67
10.	Zauralie Kurgan	52	19	0	6	1	26	127	174	64
11.	Motor Barnaul	52	15	3	4	1	29	129	167	56
12.	Metallurg Serov	52	9	1	5	4	33	108	185	38
13.	Dinamo-Energija Yekaterinburg	52	9	1	4	1	37	96	198	34
14.	Yuzhny Ural Orsk	52	5	0	9	2	36	75	170	26

== Playoffs ==
First round
W1	HC MVD Tver	3
E10	Zauralie Kurgan	0
W5	Kristall Saratov	1
E5	Sputnik Nizhny Tagil	3
E2	Amur Khabarovsk	3
W7	Krylya Sovetov Moscow	0
W3	Neftyanik Almetyevsk	3
E8	Energija Kemerovo	0
W2	Torpedo Nizhny Novgorod	3
E9	Izhstal Izhevsk	1
E3	Traktor Chelyabinsk	3
W6	Neftyanik Leninogorsk	1
E1	Mechel Chelyabinsk	3
W8	Dizel Penza	1
W4	Vityaz Chekhov	3
E7	Gazovik Tyumen	0

Quarterfinals
W1	HC MVD Tver	3
E5	Sputnik Nizhny Tagil	0
E2	Amur Khabarovsk	3
W3	Neftyanik Almetyevsk	2
W2	Torpedo Nizhny Novgorod	3
E3	HC Traktor Chelyabinsk	1
E1	HC Mechel Chelyabinsk	1
W4	Vityaz Chekhov	3

Semifinals
W1	HC MVD Tver	3
E2	Amur Khabarovsk	0
W2	Torpedo Nizhny Novgorod	2
W4	Vityaz Chekhov	3

Final
W1	HC MVD Tver	3
W4	Vityaz Chekhov	1

=== 3rd place ===
- (W2) Torpedo Nizhny Novgorod – (E2) Amur Khabarovsk 1:3, 4:3, 1:0 OT
