= Ice Hockey Federation of Russia =

Ice hockey governing body in Russia

Russia
- Association name: Ice Hockey Federation of Russia
- IIHF Code: RUS
- Founded: 12 November 1991
- IIHF membership: 19 January 1992
- Association history: Russian Empire 1911; Soviet Union 1952–1991; Russia 1992–present
- President: Vladislav Tretiak
- IIHF men's ranking: 2 (2020)
- IIHF women's ranking: 4 (2020)

The Ice Hockey Federation of Russia (Russian: Федерация Хоккея России, Federatsiya Khokkeya Rossii) is the governing body overseeing ice hockey in Russia. In 2019, Russia had 110,624 ice hockey players registered with its ice hockey federation. After the 2022 Russian invasion of Ukraine, the International Ice Hockey Federation (IIHF) suspended Russia from all levels of competition.

== History ==
Old logo, used between 1991–2015.

In February 1911, the All-Russian Hockey Union joined the IIHF, then called the "Ligue Internationale de Hockey sur Glace", representing the Russian Empire. It was expelled the same year and subsequently dissolved itself, due to the mistaken belief the federation had joined a bandy league. In 1952, the Soviet Union joined the IIHF under the Soviet Union Ice Hockey Federation.

The Ice Hockey Federation of Russia was founded on 12 November 1991, during the existence of the Soviet Union and the Russian SFSR, as the "Ice Hockey Federation of the Russian Soviet Federated Socialist Republic / Ice Hockey Federation of Russia" (Russian: Федерация Хоккея Российской Советской Федеративной Социалистической Республики / Russian: Федерация хоккея России). On 19 January 1992, after the Soviet Union was dissolved and Russia took over the international rights and obligations of the Soviet Union, the federation became the official successor of the Soviet Union Ice Hockey Federation and its successes and its full membership in the IIHF.

After the 2022 Russian invasion of Ukraine, the IIHF suspended Russia from all levels of competition.

In December 2025, officials of the International Ice Hockey Federation stated that the organisation was considering the possible reintegration of Russian national teams into international competitions.

In February 2026, International Ice Hockey Federation president Luc Tardif stated that he would like Russian and Belarusian national teams to return to international competition "as soon as possible", and indicated that steps were being considered to facilitate their eventual reintegration.

In May 2026, the IIHF stated that they would review the eligibility of Russia on an event by event basis which would create the possibility of Russian national teams to participate in IIHF events again but that the full ban was not lifted yet. On 30 October 2026, the CAS ordered that the ban be lifted and all Russian hockey teams were to be allowed to return to IIHF competitions.

== National teams ==
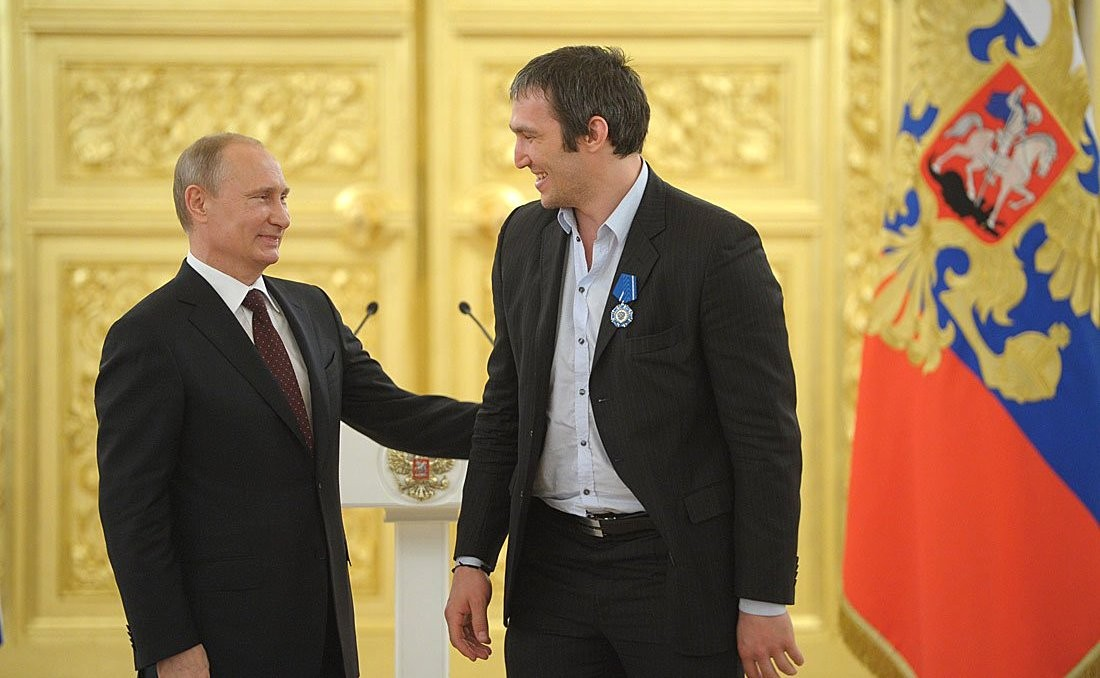
Vladimir Putin and Russian team captain Alexander Ovechkin

=== Men ===
- Men's national ice hockey team
- Men's national under-20 ice hockey team
- Men's national under-18 ice hockey team

=== Women ===
- Women's national ice hockey team
- Women's national under-18 ice hockey team

== Leagues ==
=== Active ===
- Kontinental Hockey League (KHL) – highest men's hockey league in Europe and Asia (since 2008)
- Women's Hockey League (ZhHL) – top–tier women's hockey league in Russia and China (since 1995; reorganized in 2015)
- Supreme Hockey League (VHL) – second highest men's league (since 2010)
- Supreme Hockey League Championship (VHL-B) – third highest men's league (since 2011)
- Asia League Ice Hockey (ALIH) – fourth highest men's league (since 2003)
- Junior Hockey League (MHL) – men's junior league (since 2009)
- National Junior Hockey League (NMHL) – men's junior league (since 2011)

=== Defunct ===
- International Hockey League – former highest men's league (1992–1996)
- Russian Superleague – former highest men's league, succeeding the International Hockey League (1996–2008)
- Russian Hockey Second League – fourth highest men's league

== Notable leadership ==
- Yury Karandin, president of the Siberia–Far East branch of the Ice Hockey Federation of Russia since 1991
- Yuri Korolev, vice-president of the Ice Hockey Federation of Russia from 1992 to 2001, and secretary general from 2001 to 2003
- Andrey Starovoytov, general secretary of the Soviet Union Ice Hockey Federation from 1969 to 1986
- Vladislav Tretiak, president of the Ice Hockey Federation of Russia since 2006

== See also ==
- Ice hockey in Russia
- List of Soviet and Russian ice hockey champions
