= HC Spartak St. Petersburg =

- City: St. Petersburg, Russia
- Founded: 1947
- Home arena: Dworez Sporta Spartak
- Colours: Red, white

Franchise history
- 1947-1965: HC Spartak Leningrad
- 1996-2007: HC Spartak St. Petersburg

HC Spartak St. Petersburg (Russian: ХК Спартак Санкт-Петербург) was an ice hockey team in St. Petersburg, Russia.

== History ==
The club was founded in 1947 as HC Spartak Leningrad and began playing the second-level Soviet league, the II gruppa. They participated in the Soviet Championship League during the 1962-63 season, but were relegated back to the second-level league after only one season in the top league. The club played in the second-level league until it was disbanded in 1965.

The club was revived as HC Spartak St. Petersburg in 1996. Initially operating only as a junior team, a senior team was founded in 1997 and began participating in the third-level Russian league, the Pervaya Liga. They played in the second-level league organized by the Russian Ice Hockey Federation during the 1998-99 season. They then participated in the Vysshaya Liga from the 1999-2000 season until they folded after the 2006-07 season.
