= Buran Voronezh =

Buran Voronezh Буран Воронеж
- City: Voronezh, Russia
- League: VHL 2012-present: RHL 2011-2012; Pervaya Liga 2004-2011; Vysshaya Liga 1992-2004; Soviet League Class A2 1980-1983, 1987-1988, 1989-1992; Soviet League Class A3 1979-1980, 1983-1987, 1988-1989; Soviet League Class B 1977-1979
- Founded: 1949
- Home arena: Sports Palace "Yubileyny" (3,040 seats)
- Colours
- Head coach: Viktor Semykin
- Affiliates: Dynamo Moscow (KHL); MHK Dynamo (MHL); Rossosh Voronezh (NMHL)
- Website: http://www.hcburan.ru/

Franchise history
- 1949-1977: Dynamo Voronezh
- 1977-1996, 2006–present: Buran Voronezh
- 1996-2006: HK Voronezh

Buran Voronezh (Russian: Буран Воронеж) is an ice hockey team in Voronezh, Russia. They play in the VHL, the second level of Russian ice hockey. It joined the league in 2012 and is currently affiliated with Dynamo Moscow of the KHL.

== Notable players ==
- Ivan Khlyntsev (2003–2004)
- Alexander Krysanov (2000–2004)
- Alexei Smirnov (2012–2013)
