= Motor Barnaul =

Russian ice hockey team

- City: Barnaul, Russia
- Founded: 1959
- Folded: 2006
- Colours: White, blue, red

Franchise history
- 1959-2006: Motor Barnaul

Motor Barnaul (Russian: Мотор Барнаул) was an ice hockey team in Barnaul, Russia.

== History ==
The club was founded in 1959 as the successor club to Spartak Barnaul, which had been founded in 1954. In Soviet times, Barnaul participated in various lower-level leagues.

In the 1998–99 season the club participated in the second-level league organized by the Ice Hockey Federation of Russia. From 1999-2006, the club participated in the second-level Russian league, the Vysshaya Liga.

The club was dissolved due to financial problems in 2006. It was replaced by Altai Barnaul, which currently competes in the third-level Russian league, the Pervaya Liga.
