= Zauralie Kurgan =

- City: Kurgan, Kurgan Oblast, Russia
- League: VHL
- Founded: 1962
- Home arena: Paryshev Sports Palace (capacity: 2,500)
- Colours
- Owners: Kurgan Oblast, Kurganstalmost
- General manager: Alexey Chechin
- Head coach: Alexander Usachyov
- Affiliates: Sibir Novosibirsk (KHL)
- Website: hczaural.ru

Zauralie Kurgan (Хоккейный клуб «Зауралье» Курган) is an ice hockey team in Kurgan, Kurgan Oblast, Russia. They play in the VHL, the second level of Russian ice hockey. They are affiliated to HC Sibir Novosibirsk of the Kontinental Hockey League (KHL).

== History ==
The club was founded in 1994 as a merger between clubs Mostovik (Bridge Worker) and Turbinka (Turbine) as Mostovik-Turbinka Kurgan later becoming a farm club of Rubin Tyumen. It got its current name Zauralie (Trans-Ural) since the 2003–04 season. They became affiliated with Sibir Novosibirsk of the Kontinental Hockey League in 2008, Avangard Omsk in 2012 and Metallurg Novokuznetsk in 2014. With the demotion of Novokuznetsk, Kurgan then entered into an agreement to be the primary affiliate to Metallurg Magnitogorsk of the KHL in 2017.

The club had a junior farm-club Yunior Kurgan, who played in MHL-B, second level of junior ice hockey league in Russia through 2022.

== Honors ==
=== National ===
- Vysshaya Liga (RUS-2)
  - (bronze) Third place (1): 2003/2004
- Pervaya Liga (RUS-3)
  - (gold) Champion (1): 2000/2001

== Stadium ==
- Paryshev Sports Palace

Capacity: 2500

== Team Colors ==
Blue	White

== Front Office and Coaches ==
Director

- Viktor Prozorov

General manager

- Alexey Chechin

Head coach

- Mikhail Zvyagin

Assistant coach

- Rashit Galimzhanov
- Vyacheslav Sedov
