= Kedr Novouralsk =

Russian ice hockey team

- City: Novouralsk, Russia
- League: Pervaya Liga
- Founded: 1967
- Folded: 2014
- Home arena: Novouralsk Ice Palace
- Colours: Green, Yellow

Kedr Novouralsk was an ice hockey team in Novouralsk, Russia. They played in the Pervaya Liga, the third level of Russian ice hockey. The club was founded in 1967 and ceased to exist in 2014.
