= Olimpiya Kirovo-Chepetsk =

Russian ice hockey team

- City: Kirovo-Chepetsk, Russia
- League: MHL
- Conference: 2 (east)
- Founded: 1954
- Home arena: Olimp arena
- Colours: Orange, blue, white
- General manager: Maxim Dmitrievich Medovikov
- Head coach: Yuri Igorevich Kultynov
- Website: http://mhkolimpia.ru/

Franchise history
- 1954-1964: Khimik Kirovo-Chepetsk
- 1964-present: Olimpiya Kirovo-Chepetsk

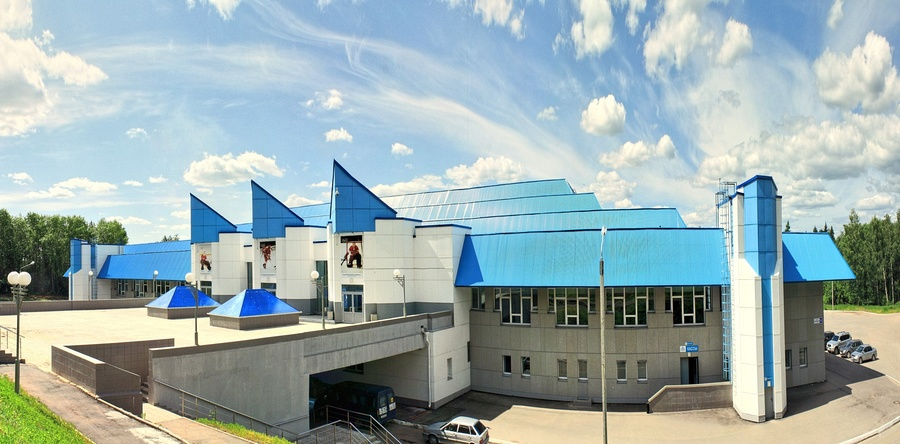
Olimpiya Kirovo-Chepetsk stadium

Olimpiya Kirovo-Chepetsk (Russian: Олимпия Кирово-Чепецк) is an ice hockey team in Kirovo-Chepetsk, Russia.

== History ==
The club was founded in 1954 as Khimik Kirovo-Chepetsk and they took on their present name of Olimpiya Kirovo-Chepetsk in 1964. During Soviet times, they participated in the lower-level leagues.

After the dissolution of the Soviet Union, the club took part in the second-level Russian league, the Vysshaya Liga, in all years from 1992-2007 except 1999, when they played in the second-level league organized by the Russian Ice Hockey Federation.

They have participated in the Russian junior league, since 2010.

The famous Soviet hockey player, two-time Olympic champion Alexander Maltsev, and also one-time Olympic champions Vladimir Myshkin, Andrey Trefilov, began his sports career at this club.
