= Energia Kemerovo =

Energija Kemerovo
- City: Kemerovo, Russia
- Founded: 1997
- Folded: 2007
- Home arena: SCC Oktiabrski
- Colours: Black, yellow, white

Franchise history
- 1997-1998: HC Kemerovo
- 1998-2007: Energia Kemerovo

Energia Kemerovo (Russian: Энергия Кемерово) was an ice hockey team in Kemerovo, Russia.

== History ==
The club was founded in 1997 as HC Kemerovo and was renamed Energia Kemerovo a year later. In 2000, they made it to the promotion round of the Vysshaya Liga and won promotion to the league by defeating Motor Barnaul three games to two in a best-of-five series. From 2001-2007, the club participated annually in the Vysshaya Liga.

The team withdrew from the Vysshaya Liga in the summer of 2007 as their home rink, SCC Oktiabrski, was undergoing renovations. Since then, they have only fielded junior teams.
