= Neftyanik Leninogorsk =

Russian ice hockey team

- City: Leninogorsk, Russia
- Founded: 1961
- Folded: 2009
- Home arena: Leninogorski DDS
- Colours: Red, green, white

Franchise history
- 1961-2009: Neftyanik Leninogorsk

Neftyanik Leninogorsk (Russian: Нефтяник Лениногорск) was an ice hockey team based in Leninogorsk, Russia.

== History ==
The club was founded in 1961 and participated in the second and third level leagues during Soviet times.

In the 1998–99 season, the club played in the second-level league organized by the Russian Ice Hockey Federation. From 2000 to 2009, they took part in the second-level league, the Vysshaya Liga.

Neftyanik Leninogorsk was disbanded due to financial problems in 2009.
