= Chelmet Chelyabinsk =

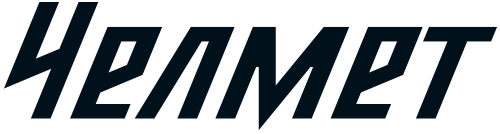
- City: Chelyabinsk, Russia
- League: VHL 2010–present: Vysshaya Liga 1992–1997, 2003–2010; RSL 1997–2003; Soviet League Class A2 1977–1981, 1985–1992; Soviet League Class A3 1969–1971, 1975–1977, 1981–1985; Soviet League Class B 1956–1969
- Founded: 1948
- Home arena: Yunost Sport Palace (3,500 seats)
- Colours
- Head coach: Maxim Smelnitsky
- Affiliates: Traktor Chelyabinsk (KHL)
- Website: https://hctraktor.org/chelmet/

Chelmet Chelyabinsk (Russian: «Челмет») is a professional ice hockey team in the VHL. Based in Chelyabinsk, Russia, and affiliated with the Kontinental Hockey League's Traktor Chelyabinsk, Chelmet plays its home games at Yunost Sports Palace.

== History ==
The team was founded by the Chelyabinsk Metallurgical Plant in 1948 as Metallurg Chelyabinsk and competed in third rate Soviet division since 1957 subsequently getting relegated to the second division (Class A2) since the 70s seasons. Since the 1985–86 Soviet League season was the main ice hockey team in Chelyabinsk replacing downgraded Traktor Chelyabinsk.

In 1990 after its parent Metallurgical Plant became a core of the Mechel metallurgical company the team was renamed Mechel Chelyabinsk. During the 90s Mechel became one of the founding clubs of the IHL and the Russian Superleague. But since 2003 it was moved to the second rate Supreme League later becoming the constituent member of the VHL. Since 2012 when Mechel withdrew its support of the team it got its current name. Current team logo based on NHL franchise Washington Capitals
