= HC Lipetsk =

- City: Lipetsk, Russia
- League: Pervaya Liga
- Founded: 1979
- Home arena: Ls starry Sports Palace
- Colours: Green, Yellow, Red

Franchise history
- 1979-1980: Metallurg Lipetsk
- 1980-1992: Traktor Lipetsk
- 1992-1994: Russki Variant Lipetsk
- 1994-present: HC Lipetsk

HC Lipetsk is an ice hockey team in Lipetsk, Russia. They play in the Pervaya Liga, the third level of Russian ice hockey. The club was founded in 1979. They played in the Russian Superleague from 1998 to 2000.

== Achievements ==
- Vysshaya Liga champion: 1998.
