= Sputnik Nizhny Tagil =

- City: Nizhny Tagil, Sverdlovsk Oblast, Russia
- League: VHL 2010-present: Vysshaya Liga 1992-1996, 1997-2010; Pervaya Liga 1996-1997; Soviet League Class A3 1967-1970, 1972-1975, 1976-1992; Soviet League Class A2 1964-1967, 1970-1972, 1975-1976; Soviet League Class B 1958-1964
- Founded: 1948
- Home arena: Sotnikov Ice Palace (4,200 seats)
- Colours
- Head coach: (Russia) Alexei Fetisov
- Affiliate: Yunior-Sputnik (MHL-B)

Franchise history
- 1948-1959: Dzerzhinets Nizhny Tagil
- 1959-1961: Avangard Nizhny Tagil
- 1961-present: Sputnik Nizhny Tagil

Sputnik Nizhny Tagil is an ice hockey team in Nizhny Tagil, Russia. They play in the VHL, the second level of Russian ice hockey. The club was formerly affiliated with Avtomobilist Yekaterinburg.

== Achievements ==
- Pervaya Liga champion: 1970, 1975.
