= HC Izhstal =

Izhstal Izhevsk
- City: Izhevsk, Udmurtia
- League: VHL; 2006–Present: Russian First League 2005–2006; Russian Major League 2001–2005
- Conference: 2
- Division: C
- Founded: 1958
- Home arena: Izhstal Sport Palace
- Colours
- General manager: Evgeny Loiferman
- Head coach: Ramil Saifullin
- Affiliates: HC Sochi (KHL); Kapitan Stupino (MHL)
- Website: hcizhstal.ru

Franchise history
- Izhstal Izhevsk 1958–Present

Izhstal Izhevsk (Russian: Ижсталь Ижевск) is a professional ice hockey team based in Izhevsk, Udmurtia, Russia. They are currently playing in the Supreme Hockey League (VHL), the second highest professional league in Russia.

== History ==
The team was founded in 1958 and represents the Udmurt Republic and the largest metallurgical enterprise of the Federation of Izhstal OJSC. In the 1958–1959 season, the Trud team representing the Izhstal plant made its debut in the USSR Ice Hockey Championship in class “B” in the 4th zone of the RSFSR. The club, having won the first Championship of the Republic in 1959–60, and repeating this achievement in 1960–61, 1970–71, 1971–72, 1973–74, 1978–79, 1984–85, 1994–95, 1999–2000, 2000–01, as a ten-time Champion of Udmurtia.

After the collapse of the Soviet Union, the team was unable to play for two seasons in 1993–94 and 1994–95 for financial reasons. From the 1995–96 season, the club has played continuously in Russia's second tier, through several league rebrandings.

Having previously served as the primary farm club to Severstal Cherepovets of the KHL, on 26 May 2020, Izhstal announced a new affiliation with HC Sochi.
