= Metallurg Serov =

Russian ice hockey team

- City: Serov, Russia
- League: Vysshaya Liga
- Founded: 1958
- Home arena: Sports Palace
- Colours: Red, Yellow, White, Black

Metallurg Serov is an ice hockey team in Serov, Russia. They play in the Vysshaya Liga, the second level of ice hockey in Russia. The club was founded in 1958.

== Notable players ==
- Maxim Khudyakov (2006)
- Maxim Yakutsenya (1998−2001)
- Denis Leonov (2001−2002)
- Ivan Lisutin (2006−2007)
- Yevgeny Medvedev (2003−2004)
- Nikita Schitov (2003−2005)
- Pavel Voroshnin (2004−2005)
