= Russian Major League (1992–2010) =

Former professional ice hockey league in Russia

Russian Major League (Vysshaya Liga)
- Countries: Russia
- Founded: 1992
- Folded: 2010
- No. of teams: 27
- Promotion to: Russian Superleague
- Relegation to: Pervaya Liga
- Associated Title(s): Bratina Cup
- Recent Champions: Yugra Khanty-Mansiysk (2009–10)
- Most successful club: Torpedo Nizhny Novgorod (3)
- Website: http://www.fhr.ru

The Russian Major League or Vysshaya Liga (Russian: Высшая лига чемпионата России по хоккею с шайбой, Supreme League of the Russian Ice Hockey Championship), also referred as Higher League or Major League and commonly abbreviated as RUS-2, was a second level professional ice hockey league in Russia.

== Season structure ==
The league consisted of two divisions (East and West) before 2008 and three divisions for the last two seasons. During 1997–2000 there was a relegation round where the strongest teams of the league played with the weakest RSL clubs for their place in the top division. In 2001–01 this system was replaced with a final round between the league teams only and starting with 2003–04 the Supreme League ultimately switched to playoffs. Its finalists were promoted to the RSL.

In 2008, when the Superleague became defunct, the Supreme League that still was operating under the FHR authority got its own cup.

== Champions ==
- 1992–93 – CSK VVS Samara
- 1993–94 – CSK VVS Samara
- 1994–95 – Neftekhimik Nizhnekamsk
- 1995–96 – Amur Khabarovsk
- 1996–97 – (West) CSKA Moscow / (East) HC Mechel
- 1997–98 – (West) HC Lipetsk / (East) Neftyanik Almetyevsk
- 1998–99 – Torpedo Nizhny Novgorod
- 1999–00 – Neftyanik Almetyevsk
- 2000–01 – Spartak Moscow
- 2001–02 – Sibir Novosibirsk
- 2002–03 – Torpedo Nizhny Novgorod
- 2003–04 – Molot-Prikamye Perm
- 2004–05 – HC MVD
- 2005–06 – Traktor Chelyabinsk
- 2006–07 – Torpedo Nizhny Novgorod
- 2007–08 – Khimik Voskresensk
- 2008–09 – Yugra Khanty-Mansiysk
- 2009–10 – Yugra Khanty-Mansiysk

== Establishment of the VHL ==
In 2010, it became known that the Vysshaya Liga was to be replaced with the KHL–affiliated Higher Hockey League (VHL) under a new ownership. Most of the Vysshaya Liga clubs re-signed with the new league in the summer of 2010.

In 2010, the Supreme Hockey League was also established.
