= List of Barys Astana seasons =

This is a list of seasons completed by Barys Astana. This list documents the records and playoff results for all season the Barys have completed since their inception in 1999.

== 1999–2009: Kazakhstan Hockey Championship ==
Note: GP = Games played, W = Wins, L = Losses, T = Ties, OTW = Overtime Wins, OTL = Overtime Losses, Pts = Points, GF = Goals for, GA = Goals against

Season	Team	Regular season									Final round									Result
Season	Team	GP	W	L	T	OTW	OTL	GF	GA	Pts	GP	W	L	T	OTW	OTL	GF	GA	Pts	Result
1999–00	1999–00	17	11	0	1	—	—	160	107	22	3	2	1	0	—	—	13	18	4	Finished 2nd in the Final Round
2000–01	2000–01	24	19	5	0	—	—	188	180	38	Final round not held									Finished 2nd in the Regular season
2001–02	2001–02	24	17	6	1	—	—	144	64	35	Final round not held									Finished 2nd in the Regular season
2002–03	2002–03	24	10	11	3	—	—	124	102	23	Final round not held									Finished 5th in the Regular season
2003–04	2003–04	24	6	17	1	—	—	81	171	13	Final round not held									Finished 5th in the Regular season
2004–05	2004–05	28	13	13	1	0	1	64	78	41	Final round not held									Finished 4th in the Regular season
2005–06	2005–06	20	8	7	4	1	0	51	51	30	Final round not held									Finished 4th in the Regular season
2006–07	2006–07	24	9	12	1	1	1	93	76	41	Final round not held									Finished 5th in the Regular season
2007–08	2007–08	24	4	19	0	1	0	40	149	14	5	4	0	—	1	0	24	9	14	Kazakhstan Champions
2008–09	2008–09	12	1	11	—	0	0	15	109	3	5	4	0	—	1	0	29	8	14	Kazakhstan Champions

== 2004–2007: Pervaya Liga ==
Note: GP = Games played, W = Wins, L = Losses, T = Ties, OTW = Overtime Wins, OTL = Overtime Losses, Pts = Points, GF = Goals for, GA = Goals against

Season	Team	Regular season									Final round									Result
Season	Team	GP	W	L	T	OTW	OTL	GF	GA	Pts	GP	W	L	T	OTW	OTL	GF	GA	Pts	Result
2004–05	2004–05	44	25	14	5	0	0	145	109	80	40	16	16	5	3	0	99	116	59	Finished 3rd in the Ural-Western Siberia Zone
2005–06	2005–06	44	28	10	1	1	0	169	82	87	40	21	16	1	1	1	127	110	67	Finished 2nd in the Ural-Western Siberia Zone
2006–07	2006–07	44	30	11	1	1	1	182	106	94	20	13	6	0	0	1	66	52	40	Ural-Western Siberia Zone Champions

== 2007–2008: Vysshaya Liga ==
Note: GP = Games played, W = Wins, L = Losses, OTW = Overtime/shootout wins, OTL = Overtime/shootout losses, Pts = Points, GF = Goals for, GA = Goals against

Season	Team	GP	W	L	OTW	OTL	Pts	GF	GA	Result	Playoffs
2007–08	2007–08	52	33	9	4	6	113	178	106	Finished 2nd in the Eastern Conference	Won in First Round, 3–0 (HC Belgorod); Lost in Quarterfinals, 3–1 (Khimik Voskresensk)

== 2008–: Kontinental Hockey League ==
Gagarin Cup Champions	Conference champions	Division champions	Continental Cup Winners

Note: GP = Games played, W = Wins, L = Losses, OTW = Overtime/shootout wins, OTL = Overtime/shootout losses, Pts = Points, GF = Goals for, GA = Goals against, PIM = Penalties in minutes

Season	Team	GP	W	L	OTW	OTL	Pts	GF	GA	PIM	Finish	Playoffs
2008–09	2008–09	56	20	25	7	4	78	174	191	1,225	5th, Chernyshev	Lost in preliminary round, 0–3 (Ak Bars Kazan)
2009–10	2009–10	56	20	23	6	7	79	169	173	814	3rd, Chernyshev	Lost in Conference Quarterfinals, 0–3 (Ak Bars Kazan)
2010–11	2010–11	54	20	21	4	9	77	155	152	766	4th, Chernyshev	Lost in Conference Quarterfinals, 0–4 (Ak Bars Kazan)
2011–12	2011–12	54	25	22	3	4	85	160	160	617	3rd, Chernyshev	Lost in Conference Quarterfinals, 3–4 (Metallurg Magnitogorsk)
2012–13	2012–13	52	23	18	5	6	85	175	161	777	3rd, Chernyshev	Lost in Conference Quarterfinals, 3–4 (Traktor Chelyabinsk)
2013–14	2013–14	54	26	18	6	4	94	182	157	688	1st, Chernyshev	Won in Conference Quarterfinals, 4–0 (Avtomobilist Yekaterinburg); Lost in Conference Semifinals, 2–4 (Salavat Yulaev Ufa)
2014–15	2014–15	60	24	21	6	9	93	170	165	963	3rd, Chernyshev	Lost in Conference Quarterfinals, 3–4 (Avangard Omsk)
2015–16	2015–16	60	21	25	8	6	85	167	184	862	5th, Chernyshev	Did not qualify
2016–17	2016–17	60	25	26	6	3	90	151	167	617	2nd, Chernyshev	Won in Conference Quarterfinals, 4–2 (Traktor Chelyabinsk); Lost in Conference Semifinals, 0–4 (Metallurg Magnitogorsk)
2017–18	2017–18	56	19	25	5	7	74	148	164		5th, Chernyshev	Did not qualify
2018–19	2018–19	62	28	14	10	10	86	190	149		1st, Chernyshev	Won in Conference Quarterfinals, 4–3 (Torpedo Nizhny Novgorod); Lost in Conference Semifinals, 1–4 (Avangard Omsk)
2019–20	2019–20	62	31	16	7	8	84	156	137		1st, Chernyshev	Won in Conference Quarterfinals, 4–1 (Metallurg Magnitogorsk); Playoffs cancelled due to COVID-19 pandemic
2020–21	2020–21	60	20	22	11	7	69	147	157		3rd, Chernyshev	Lost in Conference Quarterfinals, 2–4 (Metallurg Magnitogorsk)
2021–22	2021–22	47	14	21	8	4	48	127	138		4th, Chernyshev	Lost in Conference Quarterfinals, 1–4 (Metallurg Magnitogorsk)
2022–23	2022–23	68	20	34	7	7	61	153	194		6th, Chernyshev	Did not qualify
2023–24	2023–24	68	12	39	9	8	50	137	205		6th, Chernyshev	Did not qualify
2024–25	2024–25	68	8	47	6	7	35	99	227		6th, Chernyshev	Did not qualify
Season	Team	GP	W	L	OTW	OTL	Pts	GF	GA	PIM	Finish	Playoffs
Season totals		686	282	254	73	77	1,010	1,997	1,960	7,329	—	10 Playoff Appearances; 28–40 record
