= 2004–05 Barys Astana season =

The 2004–05 Barys Astana season was the 6th season in the Kazakhstan Hockey Championship and the 1st season in the First League of the Russian Ice Hockey Championship, in parallel.

== Kazakhstan Hockey Championship ==
=== Standings ===
#		GP	W	OTW	T	OTL	L	GF:GA	Pts
1	Kazzinc-Torpedo	28	25	0	1	0	2	137:27	76
2	Kazakhmys Karagandy	28	23	1	0	0	4	159:44	71
3	Gornyak Rudny	28	19	0	1	1	7	143:63	59
4	Barys Astana	28	13	0	1	1	13	64:78	41
5	Yenbek Almaty	28	11	0	2	0	15	84:87	35
6	Yertis Pavlodar	28	11	0	1	0	16	80:85	34
7	Kazakhmys Karagandy B	28	5	1	0	0	22	62:148	17
8	CSKA Temirtau	28	0	0	0	0	28	22:219	0

=== Schedule and results ===
No.	R	Date	Score	Opponent	Record
1	W	October 7, 2004	1–0	Kazakhmys Karagandy B	1–0–0
2	L	October 8, 2004	0–2	Kazakhmys Karagandy B	1–0–1
3	W	October 18, 2004	1–0	@ Kazakhmys Karagandy	2–0–1
4	L	October 19, 2004	0–1	@ Kazakhmys Karagandy	2–0–2
5	L	October 27, 2004	2–3	Gornyak Rudny	2–0–3
6	L	October 28, 2004	1–10	Gornyak Rudny	2–0–4
7	W	November 4, 2004	2–1	Yertis Pavlodar	3–0–4
8	L	November 5, 2004	1–3	Yertis Pavlodar	3–0–5
9	W	November 18, 2004	2–3	@ Yenbek Almaty	4–0–5
10	T	November 19, 2004	2–2	@ Yenbek Almaty	4–1–5
11	W	December 7, 2004	4–3	@ Gornyak Rudny	5–1–5
12	W	December 8, 2004	5–3	@ Gornyak Rudny	6–1–5
13	W	December 12, 2004	2–1	@ Yenbek Almaty	7–1–5
14	L	December 13, 2004	1–3	@ Yenbek Almaty	7–1–6
15	W	December 19, 2004	5–0	CSKA Temirtau	8–1–6
16	W	December 20, 2004	5–0	CSKA Temirtau	9–1–6
17	L	January 20, 2005	1–5	@ Yertis Pavlodar	9–1–7
18	W	January 21, 2005	2–1	@ Yertis Pavlodar	10–1–7
19	W	January 20, 2005	6–1	@ Kazakhmys Karagandy B	11–1–7
20	L	January 21, 2005	4–5 OT	@ Kazakhmys Karagandy B	11–1–8
21	W	February 20, 2005	5–0	@ CSKA Temirtau	12–1–8
22	W	February 21, 2005	5–0	@ CSKA Temirtau	13–1–8
23	L	February 26, 2005	1–5	Kazzinc-Torpedo	13–1–9
24	L	February 27, 2005	0–6	Kazzinc-Torpedo	13–1–10
25	L	April 15, 2005	0–6	Kazakhmys Karagandy	13–1–11
26	L	April 16, 2005	2–4	Kazakhmys Karagandy	13–1–12
27	L	April 19, 2005	0–6	@ Kazzinc-Torpedo	13–1–13
28	L	April 20, 2005	1–5	@ Kazzinc-Torpedo	13–1–14
