= 2011–12 Barys Astana season =

2011-12 Barys Astana
- Division: 3rd Chernyshev
- Conference: 6th Eastern
- 2011-12 record: 25–22–3–4
- Home record: 11–11–3–2
- Road record: 14–11–0–2
- Goals for: 160
- Goals against: 160

Team information
- President: Nurlan Orazbayev
- General manager: Vadim Gusseinov
- Coach: Andrei Shayanov
- Captain: Kevin Dallman
- Alternate captains: Vitali Novopashin; Vadim Krasnoslobodtsev
- Arena: Kazakhstan Sports Palace
- Average attendance: 3,883 (70,2%) (Total: 116,490)

Team leaders
- Goals: Brandon Bochenski (27)
- Assists: Kevin Dallman (36)
- Points: Brandon Bochenski (59)
- Penalty minutes: Josh Gratton (91)
- Plus/minus: (+): Kevin Dallman (+13) (−): R. Savchenko (-16)
- Wins: Vitali Yeremeyev (15)
- Goals against average: Vitali Yeremeyev (2.47)

The 2011–12 Barys Astana season was the Kontinental Hockey League franchise's 4th season of play and 13th season overall.

== Standings ==
=== Division standings ===
Source: Kontinental Hockey League Official Website

R		GP	W	OTW	SOW	SOL	OTL	L	GF	GA	Pts
1	Avangard Omsk	54	26	0	5	4	1	18	133	115	93
2	Salavat Yulaev Ufa	54	23	3	4	5	1	18	173	152	89
3	Barys Astana	54	25	2	1	3	1	22	160	160	85
4	Amur Khabarovsk	54	23	1	4	3	2	21	166	139	84
5	Metallurg Novokuznetsk	54	18	2	4	9	0	21	108	130	75
6	Sibir Novosibirsk	54	12	2	4	7	2	27	132	154	57

=== Conference standings ===
Source: Kontinental Hockey League Official Website

R		Div	GP	W	OTW	SOW	SOL	OTL	L	GF	GA	Pts
1	Traktor Chelyabinsk	KHA	54	32	2	5	4	0	11	163	116	114
2	Avangard Omsk	CHE	54	26	0	5	4	1	18	133	115	93
3	Metallurg Magnitogorsk	KHA	54	29	1	1	1	2	20	150	137	94
4	Ak Bars Kazan	KHA	54	27	1	2	4	1	19	167	136	92
5	Salavat Yulaev Ufa	CHE	54	23	3	4	5	1	18	173	152	89
6	Barys Astana	CHE	54	25	2	1	3	1	22	160	160	85
7	Amur Khabarovsk	CHE	54	23	1	4	3	2	21	166	139	84
8	Yugra Khanty-Mansiysk	KHA	54	19	1	9	3	3	19	139	134	83
9	Metallurg Novokuznetsk	CHE	54	18	2	4	9	0	21	108	130	75
10	Neftekhimik Nizhnekamsk	KHA	54	20	2	3	3	1	25	142	165	74
11	Sibir Novosibirsk	CHE	54	12	2	4	7	2	27	132	154	57
12	Avtomobilist Yekaterinburg	KHA	54	9	3	4	5	3	30	105	165	49

Divisions: KHA – Kharlamov Division, CHE – Chernyshev Division

== Schedule and results ==
=== Regular season ===
2011-12 Game Log
September: 3–1–0–1 (Home: 2–0–0–1; Road: 1–1–0–0) Pts. 10

Game	Date	Opponent	Score	Decision	Location	Attendance	Record	Points	Recap
1	September 14	Traktor Chelyabinsk	4-3	Jeff Glass	Kazakhstan Sports Palace	4,900	1-0-0-0	3	
2	September 16	Avangard Omsk	4-5 (SO)	Vitali Yeremeyev	Kazakhstan Sports Palace	5,200	1-0-0-1	4	
3	September 21	Dynamo Moscow	3-6 (SO)	Jeff Glass	Luzhniki Minor Arena	3,000	1-1-0-1	4	
4	September 23	Torpedo Nizhny Novgorod	1-0	Jeff Glass	Trade Union Sport Palace	5,400	2-1-0-1	7	
5	September 30	Metallurg Magnitogorsk	3-2	Jeff Glass	Kazakhstan Sports Palace	5,500	3-1-0-1	10	

October: 4–7–0–1 (Home: 2–4–0–0; Road: 2–3–0–1) Pts. 13

Game	Date	Opponent	Score	Decision	Location	Attendance	Record	Points	Recap
6	October 2	Avtomobilist Yekaterinburg	3-1	Jeff Glass	Yekaterinburg Sports Palace	3,500	4-1-0-1	13	
7	October 4	Traktor Chelyabinsk	3-4	Jeff Glass	Traktor Ice Arena	7,000	4-2-0-1	13	
8	October 8	Salavat Yulaev Ufa	1-2	Jeff Glass	Kazakhstan Sports Palace	5,497	4-3-0-1	13	
9	October 12	Dinamo Minsk	2-5	Vitali Yeremeyev	Minsk-Arena	15,046	4-4-0-1	13	
10	October 14	Atlant Moscow Oblast	0-2	Vitali Yeremeyev	Mytishchi Arena	6,300	4-5-0-1	13	
11	October 16	Dinamo Riga	5-0	Vitali Yeremeyev	Arena Riga	8,250	5-5-0-1	16	
12	October 18	SKA Saint Petersburg	3-4 (SO)	Vitali Yeremeyev	Ice Palace Saint Petersburg	8,000	5-5-0-2	17	
13	October 21	Yugra Khanty-Mansiysk	0-7	Jeff Glass	Kazakhstan Sports Palace	5,107	5-6-0-2	17	
14	October 23	Amur Khabarovsk	0-4	Vitali Yeremeyev	Kazakhstan Sports Palace	4,743	5-7-0-2	17	
15	October 25	Amur Khabarovsk	2-6	Jeff Glass	Kazakhstan Sports Palace	3,572	5-8-0-2	17	
16	October 27	Metallurg Novokuznetsk	3-1	Vitali Yeremeyev	Kazakhstan Sports Palace	3,394	6-8-0-2	20	
17	October 29	Sibir Novosibirsk	3-2	Vitali Yeremeyev	Kazakhstan Sports Palace	4,321	7-8-0-2	23	

November: 6–3–1–0 (Home: 1–2–1–0; Road: 5–1–0–0) Pts. 20

Game	Date	Opponent	Score	Decision	Location	Attendance	Record	Points	Recap
18	November 2	Neftekhimik Nizhnekamsk	5-3	Vitali Yeremeyev	Neftekhimik Ice Palace	5,000	8-8-0-2	26	
19	November 4	Ak Bars Kazan	3-2	Jeff Glass	TatNeft Arena	7,000	9-8-0-2	29	
20	November 6	Salavat Yulaev Ufa	4-2	Jeff Glass	Ufa Arena	7,950	10-8-0-2	32	
21	November 16	CSKA Moscow	2-4	Jeff Glass	Kazakhstan Sports Palace	4,076	10-9-0-2	32	
22	November 18	Metallurg Novokuznetsk	3-1	Vitali Yeremeyev	Kazakhstan Sports Palace	2,644	11-9-0-2	35	
23	November 20	Lev Poprad	2-1 (OT)	Vitali Yeremeyev	Kazakhstan Sports Palace	3,640	11-9-1-2	37	
24	November 22	Dinamo Minsk	2-6	Jeff Glass	Kazakhstan Sports Palace	2,844	11-10-1-2	37	
25	November 26	Spartak Moscow	4-2	Jeff Glass	Sokolniki Arena	1,500	12-10-1-2	40	
26	November 28	Severstal Cherepovets	1-7	Jeff Glass	Ice Palace Cherepovets	3,130	12-11-1-2	40	
27	November 30	Vityaz Chekhov	6-2	Jeff Glass	Ice Hockey Center 2004	2,500	13-11-1-2	43	

December: 4–3–0–1 (Home: 2–1–0–0; Road: 2–2–0–1) Pts. 13

Game	Date	Opponent	Score	Decision	Location	Attendance	Record	Points	Recap
28	December 2	Avtomobilist Yekaterinburg	8-1	Jeff Glass	Kazakhstan Sports Palace	3,037	14-11-1-2	46	
29	December 6	Metallurg Novokuznetsk	3-2	Jeff Glass	Kuznetsk Metallurgists Arena	4,000	15-11-1-2	49	
30	December 8	Sibir Novosibirsk	3-4 (OT)	Jeff Glass	Ice Sports Palace Sibir	4,500	15-11-1-3	50	
31	December 10	Amur Khabarovsk	5-2	Vitali Yeremeyev	Platinum Arena	7,100	16-11-1-3	53	
32	December 11	Amur Khabarovsk	1-7	Vitali Yeremeyev	Platinum Arena	7,100	16-12-1-3	53	
33	December 23	Dynamo Moscow	5-1	Vitali Yeremeyev	Kazakhstan Sports Palace	3,401	17-12-1-3	56	
34	December 27	Torpedo Nizhny Novgorod	0-2	Vitali Yeremeyev	Kazakhstan Sports Palace	2,861	17-13-1-3	56	
35	December 30	Salavat Yulaev Ufa	2-4	Vitali Yeremeyev	Ufa Arena	7,950	17-14-1-3	56	

January: 5–4–1–0 (Home: 2–1–1–0; Road: 3–3–0–0) Pts. 17

Game	Date	Opponent	Score	Decision	Location	Attendance	Record	Points	Recap
36	January 5	Metallurg Magnitogorsk	2-1	Jeff Glass	Magnitogorsk Arena	7,635	18-14-1-3	59	
37	January 7	Yugra Khanty-Mansiysk	3-1	Jeff Glass	Arena Ugra	4,050	19-14-1-3	62	
38	January 9	Avangard Omsk	2-4	Jeff Glass	Omsk Arena	9,675	19-15-1-3	62	
39	January 12	Sibir Novosibirsk	1-2	Jeff Glass	Kazakhstan Sports Palace	3,227	19-16-1-3	62	
40	January 15	SKA Saint Petersburg	5-2	Jeff Glass	Kazakhstan Sports Palace	5,200	20-16-1-3	65	
41	January 17	Dinamo Riga	6-5 (SO)	Jeff Glass	Kazakhstan Sports Palace	3,118	20-16-2-3	67	
42	January 19	Atlant Moscow Oblast	6-1	Jeff Glass	Kazakhstan Sports Palace	3,076	21-16-2-3	70	
43	January 24	Avangard Omsk	2-3	Vitali Yeremeyev	Omsk Arena	8,944	21-17-2-3	70	
44	January 26	Sibir Novosibirsk	5-0	Vitali Yeremeyev	Ice Sports Palace Sibir	3,800	22-17-2-3	73	
45	January 28	Metallurg Novokuznetsk	0-1	Vitali Yeremeyev	Kuznetsk Metallurgists Arena	4,500	22-18-2-3	73	

February: 3–4–1–1 (Home: 2–3–1–1; Road: 1–1–0–0) Pts. 12

Game	Date	Opponent	Score	Decision	Location	Attendance	Record	Points	Recap
46	February 1	Salavat Yulaev Ufa	3-4	Vitali Yeremeyev	Kazakhstan Sports Palace	3,835	22-19-2-3	73	
47	February 3	Ak Bars Kazan	4-6	Jeff Glass	Kazakhstan Sports Palace	3,750	22-20-2-3	73	
48	February 5	Neftekhimik Nizhnekamsk	7-4	Vitali Yeremeyev	Kazakhstan Sports Palace	2,834	23-20-2-3	76	
49	February 15	Avangard Omsk	2-5	Vitali Yeremeyev	Kazakhstan Sports Palace	3,923	23-21-2-3	76	
50	February 17	CSKA Moscow	1-4	Jeff Glass	CSKA Ice Palace	2,098	23-22-2-3	76	
51	February 19	Lev Poprad	3-2	Vitali Yeremeyev	Poprad Ice Stadium	4,500	24-22-2-3	79	
52	February 22	Spartak Moscow	3-2 (OT)	Vitali Yeremeyev	Kazakhstan Sports Palace	2,962	24-22-3-3	81	
53	February 24	Severstal Cherepovets	3-4 (SO)	Jeff Glass	Kazakhstan Sports Palace	2,578	24-22-3-4	82	
54	February 26	Vityaz Chekhov	3-2	Vitali Yeremeyev	Kazakhstan Sports Palace	3,605	25-22-3-4	85	

Win (3 points) Overtime/shootout win (2 points) Overtime/shootout loss (1 point) Loss (0 points)

=== Playoffs ===
2012 Gagarin Cup Playoffs
Eastern Conference Quarter-finals - #6 Barys vs. #3 Metallurg M. – Metallurg M. won series 4–3

Game	Date	Opponent	Score	Decision	Location	Attendance	Series	Recap
1	March 1	Metallurg Magnitogorsk	2–3	Vitali Yeremeyev	Magnitogorsk Arena	7,259	0-1	
2	March 2	Metallurg Magnitogorsk	4–1	Vitali Yeremeyev	Magnitogorsk Arena	7,437	1-1	
3	March 4	Metallurg Magnitogorsk	3–2	Vitali Yeremeyev	Kazakhstan Sports Palace	4,790	2-1	
4	March 5	Metallurg Magnitogorsk	4–1	Vitali Yeremeyev	Kazakhstan Sports Palace	4,790	3-1	
5	March 7	Metallurg Magnitogorsk	3–4 (OT)	Vitali Yeremeyev	Magnitogorsk Arena	6,519	3-2	
6	March 9	Metallurg Magnitogorsk	3–4 (OT)	Vitali Yeremeyev	Kazakhstan Sports Palace	4,760	3-3	
7	March 11	Metallurg Magnitogorsk	1–2 (OT)	Vitali Yeremeyev	Magnitogorsk Arena	7,653	3-4	

Win Loss

== Player statistics ==
Source: Kontinental Hockey League Official Website

=== Skaters ===
Regular season
Player	GP	G	A	Pts	+/-	PIM
Brandon Bochenski	49	27	32	59	4	26
Kevin Dallman	53	18	36	54	13	33
Dustin Boyd	53	18	15	33	0	16
Nigel Dawes	52	16	17	33	5	34
Lukáš Kašpar	47	15	15	30	1	31
Kamil Kreps	52	9	20	29	4	23
Roman Starchenko	45	12	14	26	-4	41
Jiří Novotný	42	9	13	22	-4	22
Jonas Junland	46	4	11	15	-4	40
Andrew Hutchinson	53	3	12	15	-4	40
Talgat Zhailauov	45	7	7	14	1	8
Vadim Krasnoslobodtsev	49	5	9	14	-1	16
Vitali Novopashin	50	3	10	13	13	28
Andrei Gavrilin	43	2	8	10	4	36
Fyodor Polishchuk	52	4	2	6	-8	8
Konstantin Romanov	34	4	1	5	-4	4
Evgeni Fadeyev	25	1	3	4	1	6
Josh Gratton	35	1	3	4	-2	91
Konstantin Pushkaryov	20	1	2	3	-4	4
Alexei Litvinenko	29	1	2	3	3	34
Roman Savchenko	22	1	0	1	-16	21
Alexei Ishmametiev	11	0	1	1	-1	2
Artemi Lakiza	35	0	1	1	-3	24
Maxim Khudyakov	3	0	0	0	-1	0
Evgeni Rymarev	4	0	0	0	0	0
Vadim Yermolayev	7	0	0	0	0	4
Evgeni Bumagin	11	0	0	0	-7	0

Playoffs
Player	GP	G	A	Pts	+/-	PIM
Andrew Hutchinson	7	3	3	6	3	10
Brandon Bochenski	7	0	5	5	4	8
Dustin Boyd	6	3	2	5	3	0
Andrei Gavrilin	7	3	2	5	6	0
Lukas Kaspar	7	3	1	4	0	0
Kamil Kreps	7	1	3	4	-2	4
Talgat Zhailauov	7	2	2	4	3	0
Kevin Dallman	7	1	2	3	3	2
Nigel Dawes	7	1	2	3	3	2
Jiri Novotny	7	0	3	3	0	25
Jonas Junland	7	1	1	2	3	6
Konstantin Pushkaryov	7	2	0	2	3	2
Roman Starchenko	7	0	1	1	-3	0
Evgeni Fadeyev	4	0	1	1	2	2
Alexei Litvinenko	7	0	1	1	-2	2
Vitali Novopashin	5	0	0	0	-3	0
Fyodor Polishchuk	7	0	0	0	-3	0
Konstantin Romanov	6	0	0	0	-2	2
Roman Savchenko	5	0	0	0	3	2
Vadim Yermolayev	1	0	0	0	0	0
Evgeni Bumagin	1	0	0	0	0	0

=== Goaltenders ===
Regular season
Player	GP	W	L	SOP	SOG	GA	SV	SV%	GAA	G	A	SO	PIM	TOI
Vitali Yeremeyev	32	15	11	2	931	70	861	92.5	2.47	0	0	2	0	1702:38
Jeff Glass	28	12	12	2	864	83	781	90.4	3.22	0	1	1	4	1545:42

Playoffs
Player	GP	W	L	SOP	SOG	GA	SV	SV%	GAA	G	A	SO	PIM	TOI
Vitali Yeremeyev	7	3	4	0	226	17	209	92.5	2.41	0	0	0	0	423:31

== Final roster ==
Updated March 11, 2012.

No.	Nat	Player	Pos	S/G	Age	Acquired	Birthplace
35	(Canada)	Jeff Glass	G	L	40	2009	Calgary, Alberta, Canada
30	(Kazakhstan)	Alexei Ivanov	G	L	38	2010	Omsk, Russian SFSR
31	(Kazakhstan)	Vitali Yeremeyev	G	L	51	2010	Ust-Kamenogorsk, Kazakh SSR
5	(Kazakhstan)	Alexei Litvinenko	D	L	46	2010	Ust-Kamenogorsk, Kazakh SSR
4	(Kazakhstan)	Vitali Novopashin (A)	D	L	48	2010	Ust-Kamenogorsk, Kazakh SSR
7	(Kazakhstan)	Artemi Lakiza	D	L	39	2007	Barnaul, Russian SFSR
44	(Sweden)	Jonas Junland	D	L	38	2011	Linköping, Sweden
37	(Kazakhstan)	Yevgeniy Fadeyev	D	L	44	2010	Ust-Kamenogorsk, Kazakh SSR
55	(Kazakhstan)	Alexei Ishmametiev	D	L	38	2010	Magnitogorsk, Russian SFSR
38	(Canada)	Kevin Dallman (C)	D	R	45	2008	Niagara Falls, Ontario, Canada
2	(Kazakhstan)	Roman Savchenko	D	L	38	2009	Ust-Kamenogorsk, Kazakh SSR
24	(United States)	Andrew Hutchinson	D	R	46	2011	Evanston, Illinois, USA
8	(Kazakhstan)	Talgat Zhailauov	C	R	41	2007	Ust-Kamenogorsk, Kazakh SSR
41	(Canada)	Dustin Boyd	C	L	40	2011	Winnipeg, Manitoba, Canada
12	(Czech Republic)	Jiří Novotný	C	R	43	2010	Pelhrimov, Czechoslovakia
28	(Czech Republic)	Kamil Kreps	C	R	41	2010	Litoměřice, Czechoslovakia
48	(Kazakhstan)	Roman Starchenko	C	L	40	2008	Ust-Kamenogorsk, Kazakh SSR
15	(Kazakhstan)	Maxim Khudyakov	C	L	40	2010	Ust-Kamenogorsk, Kazakh SSR
32	(Russia)	Vadim Yermolayev	F	R	37	2010	Magnitogorsk, Russian SFSR
62	(Kazakhstan)	Vadim Krasnoslobodtsev (A)	LW	L	43	2008	Ust-Kamenogorsk, Kazakh SSR
18	(Kazakhstan)	Fedor Polishchuk	LW	L	47	2010	Chernihiv, Ukrainian SSR
14	(Canada)	Josh Gratton	LW	L	44	2011	Brantford, Ontario, Canada
9	(Canada)	Nigel Dawes	LW	L	41	2011	Winnipeg, Manitoba, Canada
21	(Czech Republic)	Lukáš Kašpar	LW	L	41	2010	Most, Czechoslovakia
27	(United States)	Brandon Bochenski	RW	R	44	2010	Blaine, Minnesota, USA
77	(Kazakhstan)	Evgeni Bumagin	RW	L	44	2010	Belgorod, Russian SFSR
33	(Kazakhstan)	Andrei Gavrilin	RW	L	48	2007	Karaganda, Kazakh SSR
34	(Kazakhstan)	Konstantin Pushkaryov	RW	L	41	2010	Ust-Kamenogorsk, Kazakh SSR
88	(Kazakhstan)	Evgeni Rymarev	RW	L	38	2009	Ust-Kamenogorsk, Kazakh SSR
85	(Kazakhstan)	Konstantin Romanov	RW	L	41	2009	Moscow, Russian SFSR

== Draft picks ==
Barys Astana's picks at the 2011 KHL Junior Draft in Moscow, Russia at the Mytishchi Arena on May 28, 2011.

Round	Pick	Player	Position	Nationality	College/Junior/Club team (League)
2	38	Dmitri Sinitsyn	D	Russia	Dallas Stars U18 (Midget AAA)
3	58	Alexander Nikulnikov	LW	Russia	Rouyn-Noranda Huskies (QMJHL)
4	93	Evgeni Evseyev	D	Kazakhstan	Kazzinc-Torpedo (KAZ)
4	101	Nikolai Skladnichenko	C	Russia	Bobcaygeon Bucks (GMHL)
5	120	Roman Stefan	D	Kazakhstan	Kazzinc-Torpedo (KAZ)

== See also ==
- 2011–12 KHL season
