= 2002–03 Barys Astana season =

The 2002–03 Barys Astana season was the 4th season of the franchise.

== Kazakhstan Hockey Championship ==
Source: PassionHockey.com

=== Standings ===
	GP	W	T	L	GF:GA	Pts
Kazzinc-Torpedo	24	23	1	0	224:26	47:1
Kazakhmys Karagandy	24	17	2	5	138:62	36:12
Yenbek Almaty	24	14	2	8	103:70	30:18
Gornyak Rudny	24	11	2	11	106:85	24:24
Barys Astana	24	10	3	11	124:102	23:25
CSKA Temirtau	24	4	0	20	62:165	8:40
Yessil Petropavlovsk	24	0	0	24	31:278	0:48
