= 2005–06 Barys Astana season =

The 2004–05 Barys Astana season was the 7th season in the Kazakhstan Hockey Championship and the 2nd season in the First League of the Russian Ice Hockey Championship, in parallel.

== Kazakhstan Hockey Championship ==
=== Standings ===
#		GP	W	OTW	T	OTL	L	GF:GA	Pts
1	Kazakhmys Karagandy	20	14	0	2	1	3	89:33	45
2	Kazzinc-Torpedo	20	13	0	2	0	5	80:47	41
3	Gornyak Rudny	20	11	1	2	0	6	82:54	37
4	Barys Astana	20	8	1	4	0	7	51:51	30
5	Yertis Pavlodar	20	6	0	2	0	12	71:75	20
6	Yenbek Almaty	20	0	0	0	1	19	35:148	1

=== Schedule and results ===
No.	R	Date	Score	Opponent	Record
1	L	September 9, 2005	1–0	@ Gornyak Rudny	0–0–0–0–1
2	T	September 12, 2005	3–3	@ Gornyak Rudny	0–0–1–0–1
3	W	September 12, 2005	3–1	Yenbek Almaty	1–0–3–0–2
4	W	September 12, 2005	3–2 (OT)	Yenbek Almaty	1–1–3–0–3
5	T	September 16, 2005	3–3	Kazakhmys Karagandy	1–1–2–0–1
6	L	September 17, 2005	0–1	Kazakhmys Karagandy	1–1–2–0–2
7	T	November 1, 2005	2–2	Kazzinc-Torpedo	1–1–3–0–2
8	L	November 2, 2005	0–3	Kazzinc-Torpedo	1–1–3–0–3
9	W	December 6, 2005	1–3	@ Yenbek Almaty	2–1–3–0–2
10	W	December 7, 2005	2–4	@ Yenbek Almaty	3–1–3–0–3
11	W	January 8, 2006	4–2	Gornyak Rudny	4–1–3–0–2
12	W	January 9, 2006	2–0	Gornyak Rudny	5–1–3–0–3
13	W	January 20, 2006	2–1	Yertis Pavlodar	6–1–3–0–2
14	W	January 21, 2006	6–3	Yertis Pavlodar	7–1–3–0–3
15	W	April 5, 2006	3–2	@ Yertis Pavlodar	8–1–3–0–2
16	T	April 6, 2006	2–2	@ Yertis Pavlodar	9–1–4–0–3
17	L	April 16, 2006	1–4	@ Kazzinc-Torpedo	9–1–4–0–4
18	L	April 17, 2006	3–5	@ Kazzinc-Torpedo	9–1–4–0–5
19	L	April 29, 2006	3–5	@ Kazakhmys Karagandy	9–1–4–0–6
20	L	April 30, 2006	2–6	@ Kazakhmys Karagandy	9–1–4–0–7
