= 2010–11 Barys Astana season =

2010-11 Barys Astana
- Division: 4th Chernyshev
- Conference: 7th Eastern
- 2010-11 record: 20–21–4–9
- Home record: 11-8-3-5
- Road record: 9-13-1-4
- Goals for: 155
- Goals against: 152

Team information
- President: Nurlan Orazbayev
- General manager: Vadim Guseinov
- Coach: Andrei Khomutov
- Captain: Kevin Dallman
- Alternate captains: Sergei Gimayev; Vadim Krasnoslobodtsev
- Arena: Kazakhstan Sports Palace
- Average attendance: 4,819 (87,1 %) (Total: 279,502)

Team leaders
- Goals: Lukas Kaspar (23)
- Assists: Jiri Novotny (28)
- Points: Brandon Bochenski (45)
- Penalty minutes: Jiri Novotny (78)
- Plus/minus: (+): V. Novopashin (+25) (−): Sergei Gimayev (-12)
- Wins: Vitali Yeremeyev (15)
- Goals against average: Vitali Yeremeyev (2.30)

The 2010–11 Barys Astana season was the Kontinental Hockey League franchise's 3rd season of play.

== Standings ==
=== Division standings ===
Source: Kontinental Hockey League Official Website

R		GP	W	OTW	SOW	SOL	OTL	L	GF	GA	Pts
1	Avangard Omsk	54	31	9	2	2	1	9	176	120	118
2	Salavat Yulaev Ufa	54	29	5	4	4	0	12	210	144	109
3	Sibir Novosibirsk	54	22	2	4	1	4	21	133	131	83
4	Barys Astana	54	20	2	2	6	3	21	155	152	77
5	Amur Khabarovsk	54	13	1	1	3	4	32	112	173	50
6	Metallurg Novokuznetsk	54	8	1	3	4	5	33	105	186	41

=== Conference standings ===
Source: Kontinental Hockey League Official Website

R		Div	GP	W	OTW	SOW	SOL	OTL	L	GF	GA	Pts
1	Avangard Omsk	CHE	54	31	9	2	2	1	9	176	120	118
2	Ak Bars Kazan	KHA	54	29	2	3	5	3	12	181	133	105
3	Salavat Yulaev Ufa	CHE	54	29	5	4	4	0	12	210	144	109
4	Metallurg Magnitogorsk	KHA	54	27	1	5	3	4	14	167	141	100
5	Yugra Khanty-Mansiysk	KHA	54	22	0	6	6	3	17	145	151	87
6	Sibir Novosibirsk	CHE	54	22	2	4	1	4	21	133	131	83
7	Barys Astana	CHE	54	20	2	2	6	3	21	155	152	77
8	Neftekhimik Nizhnekamsk	KHA	54	22	1	2	1	2	26	159	162	75
9	Traktor Chelyabinsk	KHA	54	14	6	2	5	1	26	142	166	64
10	Avtomobilist Yekaterinburg	KHA	54	10	6	4	2	1	31	134	184	53
11	Amur Khabarovsk	CHE	54	13	1	1	3	4	32	112	173	50
12	Metallurg Novokuznetsk	CHE	54	8	1	3	4	5	33	105	186	41

Divisions: KHA – Kharlamov Division, CHE – Chernyshev Division

== Schedule and results ==
=== Regular season ===
2010-11 Game Log
September: 4–3–0–1 (Home: 3–2–0–1; Road: 1–1–0–0) Pts. 13

Game	Date	Opponent	Score	Decision	Location	Attendance	Record	Points	Recap
1	September 11	Severstal Cherepovets	2-5	Jeff Glass	Kazakhstan Sports Palace	4,500	0-1-0-0	0	
2	September 13	SKA Saint Petersburg	4-3	Jeff Glass	Kazakhstan Sports Palace	4,100	1-1-0-0	3	
3	September 15	Spartak Moscow	5-0	Jeff Glass	Kazakhstan Sports Palace	4,600	2-1-0-0	6	
4	September 17	Salavat Yulaev Ufa	5-6 (SO)	Jeff Glass	Kazakhstan Sports Palace	5,300	2-1-0-1	7	
5	September 19	Metallurg Novokuznetsk	4-1	Vitali Yeremeyev	Kazakhstan Sports Palace	4,200	3-1-0-1	10	
6	September 23	Dynamo Moscow	1-3	Vitali Yeremeyev	Luzhniki Minor Arena	3,500	3-2-0-1	10	
7	September 25	Vityaz Chekhov	3-1	Vitali Yeremeyev	Ice Hockey Center 2004	2,700	4-2-0-1	13	
8	September 29	Dinamo Riga	1-5	Vitali Yeremeyev	Kazakhstan Sports Palace	5,000	4-3-0-1	13	

October: 6–5–0–3 (Home: 4–1–0–2; Road: 2–4–0–1) Pts. 24

Game	Date	Opponent	Score	Decision	Location	Attendance	Record	Points	Recap
9	October 1	Dinamo Minsk	4-2	Jeff Glass	Kazakhstan Sports Palace	5,000	5-3-0-1	16	
10	October 3	CSKA Moscow	2-6	Jeff Glass	Kazakhstan Sports Palace	4,700	5-4-0-1	16	
11	October 6	Amur Khabarovsk	5-2	Vitali Yeremeyev	Kazakhstan Sports Palace	4,100	6-4-0-1	19	
12	October 8	Sibir Novosibirsk	3-1	Vitali Yeremeyev	Ice Sports Palace Sibir	7,300	7-4-0-1	22	
13	October 10	Metallurg Magnitogorsk	2-5	Vitali Yeremeyev	Magnitogorsk Arena	6,870	7-5-0-1	22	
14	October 12	Salavat Yulaev Ufa	4-5 (OT)	Jeff Glass	Ufa Arena	7,950	7-5-0-2	23	
15	October 14	Traktor Chelyabinsk	2-4	Vitali Yeremeyev	Traktor Sport Palace	6,000	7-6-0-2	23	
16	October 16	Yugra Khanty-Mansiysk	4-5 (SO)	Vitali Yeremeyev	Kazakhstan Sports Palace	4,300	7-6-0-3	24	
17	October 19	Sibir Novosibirsk	3-1	Vitali Yeremeyev	Kazakhstan Sports Palace	4,300	8-6-0-3	27	
18	October 21	Metallurg Novokuznetsk	1-2 (OT)	Vitali Yeremeyev	Kazakhstan Sports Palace	4,300	8-6-0-4	28	
19	October 23	Amur Khabarovsk	3-1	Jeff Glass	Kazakhstan Sports Palace	4,400	9-6-0-4	31	
20	October 27	Ak Bars Kazan	5-2	Jeff Glass	TatNeft Arena	3,790	10-6-0-4	34	
21	October 29	Avtomobilist Yekaterinburg	2-3	Vitali Yeremeyev	Yekaterinburg Sports Palace	4,700	10-7-0-4	34	
22	October 31	Neftekhimik Nizhnekamsk	3-5	Jeff Glass	Neftekhimik Ice Palace	4,500	10-8-0-4	34	

November: 2–3–2–1 (Home: 1–2–1–1; Road: 1–1–1–0) Pts. 11

Game	Date	Opponent	Score	Decision	Location	Attendance	Record	Points	Recap
23	November 2	Avangard Omsk	6-4	Vitali Yeremeyev	Kazakhstan Sports Palace	5,500	11-8-0-4	37	
24	November 5	Yugra Khanty-Mansiysk	3-2 (OT)	Vitali Yeremeyev	Arena Ugra	5,100	11-8-1-4	39	
25	November 7	Salavat Yulaev Ufa	6-2	Vitali Yeremeyev	Ufa Arena	7,950	12-8-1-4	42	
26	November 17	Lokomotiv Yaroslavl	3-2 (SO)	Vitali Yeremeyev	Kazakhstan Sports Palace	5,300	12-8-2-4	44	
27	November 19	Atlant Moscow Oblast	0-2	Vitali Yeremeyev	Kazakhstan Sports Palace	4,700	12-9-2-4	44	
28	November 21	Torpedo Nizhny Novgorod	2-3 (SO)	Jeff Glass	Kazakhstan Sports Palace	4,400	12-9-2-5	45	
29	November 25	Avangard Omsk	0-3	Vitali Yeremeyev	Kazakhstan Sports Palace	5,500	12-10-2-5	45	
30	November 29	Severstal Cherepovets	1-3	Vitali Yeremeyev	Ice Palace Cherepovets	2,000	12-11-2-5	45	

December: 2–5–1–0 (Home: 1–0–1–0; Road: 1–5–0–0) Pts. 8

Game	Date	Opponent	Score	Decision	Location	Attendance	Record	Points	Recap
31	December 1	Spartak Moscow	2-3	Vitali Yeremeyev	Sokolniki Arena	1,100	12-12-2-5	45	
32	December 3	SKA Saint Petersburg	2-4	Jeff Glass	Ice Palace Saint Petersburg	5,500	12-13-2-5	45	
33	December 6	Dynamo Moscow	2-1 (OT)	Vitali Yeremeyev	Kazakhstan Sports Palace	5,300	12-13-3-5	47	
34	December 8	Vityaz Chekhov	2-0	Vitali Yeremeyev	Kazakhstan Sports Palace	5,300	13-13-3-5	50	
35	December 12	Avangard Omsk	2-3	Vitali Yeremeyev	Omsk Arena	9,586	13-14-3-5	50	
36	December 22	Dinamo Minsk	0-4	Jeff Glass	Minsk-Arena	9,170	13-15-3-5	50	
37	December 24	Dinamo Riga	4-0	Vitali Yeremeyev	Arena Riga	4,750	14-15-3-5	53	
38	December 26	CSKA Moscow	1-3	Vitali Yeremeyev	CSKA Ice Palace	1,686	14-16-3-5	53	

January: 5–4–1–3 (Home: 2–3–1–1; Road: 3–1–0–2) Pts. 20

Game	Date	Opponent	Score	Decision	Location	Attendance	Record	Points	Recap
39	January 3	Sibir Novosibirsk	0-1	Jeff Glass	Kazakhstan Sports Palace	5,400	14-17-3-5	53	
40	January 5	Salavat Yulaev Ufa	4-3 (SO)	Vitali Yeremeyev	Kazakhstan Sports Palace	5,500	14-17-4-5	55	
41	January 7	Traktor Chelyabinsk	4-3	Vitali Yeremeyev	Kazakhstan Sports Palace	5,000	15-17-4-5	58	
42	January 9	Metallurg Magnitogorsk	1-3	Vitali Yeremeyev	Kazakhstan Sports Palace	5,400	15-18-4-5	58	
43	January 12	Amur Khabarovsk	4-2	Vitali Yeremeyev	Platinum Arena	7,100	16-18-4-5	61	
44	January 13	Amur Khabarovsk	3-5	Vitali Yeremeyev	Platinum Arena	7,100	16-19-4-5	61	
45	January 15	Sibir Novosibirsk	3-1	Jeff Glass	Ice Sports Palace Sibir	7,300	17-19-4-5	64	
46	January 17	Metallurg Novokuznetsk	5-3	Jeff Glass	Kuznetsk Metallurgists Arena	2,830	18-19-4-5	67	
47	January 19	Avtomobilist Yekaterinburg	3-4 (SO)	Jeff Glass	Kazakhstan Sports Palace	4,400	18-19-4-6	68	
48	January 21	Neftekhimik Nizhnekamsk	1-2	Vitali Yeremeyev	Kazakhstan Sports Palace	4,100	18-20-4-6	68	
49	January 23	Ak Bars Kazan	2-3 (SO)	Vitali Yeremeyev	Kazakhstan Sports Palace	5,500	18-20-4-7	69	
50	January 25	Metallurg Novokuznetsk	10-2	Vitali Yeremeyev	Kuznetsk Metallurgists Arena	2,100	19-20-4-7	72	
51	January 27	Avangard Omsk	2-3 (SO)	Jeff Glass	Omsk Arena	10,070	19-20-4-8	73	

February: 1–1–0–1 (Home: 0–0–0–0; Road: 1–1–0–1) Pts. 4

Game	Date	Opponent	Score	Decision	Location	Attendance	Record	Points	Recap
52	February 16	Torpedo Nizhny Novgorod	5-3	Vitali Yeremeyev	Trade Union Sport Palace	5,400	20-20-4-8	76	
53	February 18	Lokomotiv Yaroslavl	3-5	Vitali Yeremeyev	Arena 2000	9,000	20-21-4-8	76	
54	February 20	Atlant Moscow Oblast	1-2 (OT)	Jeff Glass	Mytishchi Arena	6,400	20-21-4-9	77	

Win (3 points) Overtime/shootout win (2 points) Overtime/shootout loss (1 point) Loss (0 points)

=== Playoffs ===
2011 Gagarin Cup Playoffs
Eastern Conference Quarter-finals - #7 Barys vs. #2 Ak Bars – Ak Bars won series 4–0

Game	Date	Opponent	Score	Decision	Location	Attendance	Series	Recap
1	February 24	Ak Bars Kazan	0–1	Vitali Yeremeyev	TatNeft Arena	5,600	0-1	
2	February 24	Ak Bars Kazan	0–3	Jeff Glass	TatNeft Arena	4,800	0-2	
3	February 27	Ak Bars Kazan	1–6	Vitali Yeremeyev	Kazakhstan Sports Palace	5,500	0-3	
4	February 28	Ak Bars Kazan	2–4	Jeff Glass	Kazakhstan Sports Palace	5,000	0-4	

Win Loss

== Player statistics ==
Source: Kontinental Hockey League Official Website

=== Skaters ===
Regular season
Player	GP	G	A	Pts	+/-	PIM
Brandon Bochenski	40	22	23	45	19	36
Lukas Kaspar	51	23	18	41	5	41
Jiri Novotny	53	13	28	41	9	78
Kevin Dallman	53	12	27	39	10	40
Talgat Zhailauov	45	7	18	25	2	10
Vadim Krasnoslobodtsev	50	13	10	23	4	18
Andrei Gavrilin	47	9	14	23	3	36
Roman Starchenko	48	11	10	21	-2	33
Vitali Novopashin	49	5	13	18	25	22
Maxim Khudyakov	37	7	7	14	-1	18
Roman Savchenko	52	5	9	14	-2	32
Sergei Gimayev	52	5	3	8	-12	44
Kyle Calder	13	3	5	8	4	16
Fedor Polishchuk	43	1	7	8	-9	18
Konstantin Romanov	40	3	3	6	-11	16
Evgeni Bumagin	38	1	5	6	-7	12
Alexander Shin	16	2	3	5	-5	2
Evgeni Fadeyev	40	2	3	5	-1	18
Alexei Vorontsov	32	1	3	4	-2	24
Alexei Vasilchenko	34	1	3	4	-2	24
Evgeni Rymarev	37	0	4	4	-5	12
Alexei Ishmametyev	12	0	3	3	-6	8
Ilya Solaryov	4	1	1	2	-3	2
Viktor Alexandrov	11	1	1	2	-3	10
Tomas Kloucek	17	1	1	2	-10	65
Tom Preissing	2	1	0	1	-1	0
Riley Armstrong	9	1	0	1	-1	16
Andrei Spiridonov	22	1	0	1	-6	4
Konstantin Pushkaryov	9	0	1	1	-6	8
Alexei Litvinenko	9	0	1	1	1	24
Artemi Lakiza	1	0	0	0	0	0
Vadim Yermolayev	2	0	0	0	0	0
Anton Kazantsev	4	0	0	0	-5	0

Playoffs
Player	GP	G	A	Pts	+/-	PIM
Kevin Dallman	4	0	2	2	-4	6
Brandon Bochenski	4	0	1	1	-3	2
Lukas Kaspar	4	1	0	1	-4	10
Roman Starchenko	4	1	0	1	-3	0
Kyle Calder	3	0	1	1	-1	6
Jiri Novotny	4	0	0	0	-4	2
Talgat Zhailauov	4	0	0	0	-1	2
Vadim Krasnoslobodtsev	4	0	0	0	-1	0
Andrei Gavrilin	4	0	0	0	0	6
Vitali Novopashin	4	0	0	0	-3	0
Maxim Khudyakov	4	0	0	0	-2	2
Roman Savchenko	4	0	0	0	-2	2
Sergei Gimayev	4	0	0	0	-1	4
Fedor Polishchuk	4	0	0	0	0	0
Evgeni Fadeyev	4	0	0	0	-2	0
Alexei Vasilchenko	1	0	0	0	-1	2
Evgeni Rymarev	1	0	0	0	-1	0
Ilya Solaryov	4	0	0	0	0	2
Viktor Alexandrov	4	0	0	0	2	2
Tomas Kloucek	3	0	0	0	1	6

=== Goaltenders ===
Regular season
Player	GP	W	L	SOP	SOG	GA	SV	SV%	GAA	G	A	SO	PIM	TOI
Vitali Yeremeyev	35	15	15	4	1072	78	994	92.7	2.30	0	1	2	0	2035:13
Jeff Glass	23	7	9	4	684	61	623	91.1	2.95	0	1	1	12	1240:07

Playoffs
Player	GP	W	L	SOP	SOG	GA	SV	SV%	GAA	G	A	SO	PIM	TOI
Vitali Yeremeyev	2	0	2	0	79	7	72	91.0	3.53	0	0	0	0	118:58
Jeff Glass	2	0	2	0	67	6	61	91.1	3.02	0	0	0	2	119:17

== Final roster ==
Updated April 16, 2011.

No.	Nat	Player	Pos	S/G	Age	Acquired	Birthplace
35	(Canada)	Jeff Glass	G	L	39	2009	Calgary, Alberta, Canada
30	(Kazakhstan)	Alexei Ivanov	G	L	36	2010	Omsk, Russian SFSR
31	(Kazakhstan)	Vitali Yeremeyev	G	L	49	2010	Ust-Kamenogorsk, Kazakh SSR
5	(Kazakhstan)	Alexei Litvinenko	D	L	45	2010	Ust-Kamenogorsk, Kazakh SSR
42	(United States)	Tom Preissing	D	R	46	2010	Arlington Heights, Illinois, United States
4	(Kazakhstan)	Vitali Novopashin	D	L	46	2010	Ust-Kamenogorsk, Kazakh SSR
7	(Kazakhstan)	Artemi Lakiza	D	L	37	2007	Barnaul, Russian SFSR
59	(Russia)	Sergei Gimayev (A)	D	L	41	2008	Cherepovets, Russian SFSR
37	(Kazakhstan)	Evgeni Fadeyev	D	L	42	2010	Ust-Kamenogorsk, Kazakh SSR
22	(Czech Republic)	Tomas Kloucek	D	L	45	2008	Prague, Czechoslovakia
24	(Kazakhstan)	Anton Kazantsev	D	L	38	2008	Rudny, Kazakh SSR
55	(Kazakhstan)	Alexei Ishmametyev	D	L	36	2010	Magnitogorsk, Russian SFSR
38	(Canada)	Kevin Dallman (C)	D	R	44	2008	Niagara Falls, Ontario, Canada
2	(Kazakhstan)	Roman Savchenko	D	L	36	2009	Ust-Kamenogorsk, Kazakh SSR
29	(Kazakhstan)	Alexei Vasilchenko	D	L	43	2008	Ust-Kamenogorsk, Kazakh SSR
8	(Kazakhstan)	Talgat Zhailauov	C	R	39	2007	Ust-Kamenogorsk, Kazakh SSR
12	(Czech Republic)	Jiri Novotny	C	R	41	2010	Pelhrimov, Czechoslovakia
49	(Kazakhstan)	Alexander Shin	C	L	39	2009	Ust-Kamenogorsk, Kazakh SSR
23	(Kazakhstan)	Andrei Spiridonov	C	L	42	2008	Ust-Kamenogorsk, Kazakh SSR
48	(Kazakhstan)	Roman Starchenko	C	L	38	2008	Ust-Kamenogorsk, Kazakh SSR
15	(Kazakhstan)	Maxim Khudyakov	C	L	38	2010	Ust-Kamenogorsk, Kazakh SSR
25	(Kazakhstan)	Ilya Solaryov	C	L	42	2007	Perm, Russian SFSR
32	(Russia)	Vadim Yermolayev	F	R	36	2010	Magnitogorsk, Russian SFSR
62	(Kazakhstan)	Vadim Krasnoslobodtsev (A)	LW	L	41	2008	Ust-Kamenogorsk, Kazakh SSR
18	(Kazakhstan)	Fedor Polishchuk	LW	L	45	2010	Chernihiv, Ukrainian SSR
54	(Kazakhstan)	Alexei Vorontsov	LW	L	39	2009	Ust-Kamenogorsk, Kazakh SSR
19	(Canada)	Kyle Calder	LW	L	46	2010	Mannville, Alberta, Canada
21	(Czech Republic)	Lukas Kaspar	LW	L	39	2010	Most, Czechoslovakia
27	(United States)	Brandon Bochenski	RW	R	42	2010	Blaine, Minnesota, United States
77	(Kazakhstan)	Evgeni Bumagin	RW	L	42	2010	Belgorod, Russian SFSR
33	(Kazakhstan)	Andrei Gavrilin	RW	L	46	2007	Karaganda, Kazakh SSR
34	(Kazakhstan)	Konstantin Pushkaryov	RW	L	40	2010	Ust-Kamenogorsk, Kazakh SSR
88	(Kazakhstan)	Evgeni Rymarev	RW	L	36	2009	Ust-Kamenogorsk, Kazakh SSR
11	(Canada)	Riley Armstrong	RW	R	40	2010	Saskatoon, Saskatchewan, Canada
85	(Kazakhstan)	Konstantin Romanov	RW	L	40	2009	Moscow, Russian SFSR
17	(Kazakhstan)	Viktor Alexandrov	RW	L	39	2010	Aktobe, Kazakh SSR

== Draft picks ==
Barys Astana's picks at the 2010 KHL Junior Draft in Moscow, Russia on June 4, 2010.

Round	Pick	Player	Position	Nationality	College/Junior/Club team (League)
3	58	Timofei Tankeyev	C	Russia	Erie Otters (OHL)
4	88	Olivier Roy	G	Canada	Acadie-Bathurst Titan (QMJHL)
5	107	Oleg Yevenko	D	Belarus	Fargo Force (USHL)
5	118	Marek Hrivik	LW	Slovakia	Moncton Wildcats (QMJHL)
6	121	Adam Janosik	D	Slovakia	Gatineau Olympiques (QMJHL)
7	146	Denis Chaltsev	G	Russia	St. Louis Jr. Blues (CSHL)
7	174	Danil Semyan	F	Russia	Grand Rapids Owls (CSHL)

== See also ==
- 2010–11 KHL season
