= 2003–04 Barys Astana season =

The 2003–04 Barys Astana season was the 5th season of the franchise.

== Kazakhstan Hockey Championship ==
Source: PassionHockey.com

=== Standings ===
	GP	W	T	L	GF:GA	Pts
Kazzinc-Torpedo	24	22	1	1	226:32	45:3
Gornyak Rudny	24	18	1	5	152:59	37:11
Kazakhmys Karagandy	24	17	2	5	163:47	36:12
Yenbek Almaty	24	11	2	11	131:86	24:24
Barys Astana	24	6	1	17	81:171	13:35
CSKA Temirtau	24	6	0	18	66:198	12:36
Ustinka Ust-Kamenogorsk	24	0	1	23	39:262	1:47
