= 2000–01 Barys Astana season =

The 2000–01 Barys Astana season was the 2nd season of the franchise.

== Kazakhstan Hockey Championship ==
Source: PassionHockey.com

=== Standings ===
| # | | GP | W | T | L | GF:GA | Pts |
|---|---|---|---|---|---|---|---|
| 1 | Kazzinc-Torpedo | 24 | 22 | 0 | 2 | 241:63 | 44:4 |
| 2 | Barys Astana | 24 | 19 | 0 | 5 | 188:80 | 38:10 |
| 3 | CSKA Temirtau | 24 | 16 | 2 | 6 | 148:123 | 34:14 |
| 4 | Yenbek Almaty | 24 | 10 | 3 | 11 | 83:126 | 23:25 |
| 5 | Yessil Petropavlovsk | 22 | 6 | 0 | 16 | 64:142 | 12:32 |
| 6 | Yunost Karagandy | 24 | 3 | 1 | 20 | 82:218 | 7:41 |
| 7 | Gornyak Rudny | 22 | 3 | 0 | 19 | 46:129 | 6:38 |
