= 2001–02 Barys Astana season =

The 2001–02 Barys Astana season was the 3rd season of the franchise.

== Kazakhstan Hockey Championship ==
Source: PassionHockey.com

=== Standings ===
#		GP	W	T	L	GF:GA	Pts
1	Kazzinc-Torpedo	24	23	0	1	244:46	46:2
2	Barys Astana	24	17	1	6	144:64	35:13
3	Gornyak Rudny	24	17	1	6	139:42	35:13
4	Yenbek Almaty	24	12	0	12	114:101	24:24
5	CSKA Temirtau	24	9	0	15	94:130	18:30
6	Yessil Petropavlovsk	24	4	1	19	33:205	9:39
7	Yunost Karagandy	24	0	1	23	24:204	1:47
8	Yertis Pavlodar	–	–	–	–	–:–	–:–
