= 1999–2000 Barys Astana season =

The 1999–2000 Barys Astana season was the inaugural season of the franchise.

== Kazakhstan Hockey Championship ==
Source: PassionHockey.com

=== Standings ===
==== First round ====
#		GP	W	T	L	GF:GA	Pts
1	Bulat Temirtau	17	16	0	1	191:71	32:2
2	Barys Astana	17	11	0	6	160:107	22:12
3	Yenbek Almaty	17	9	1	7	136:110	19:15
4	Avangard Petropavlovsk	17	9	1	7	113:113	19:15
5	Avtomobilist Karagandy	12	5	0	7	69:80	10:14
6	Amid Rudny	12	5	0	7	74:87	10:14
7	Magnitka Temirtau	17	2	0	15	71:191	4:30
8	Yunost Karagandy	7	0	0	7	14:69	0:14

==== Final round ====
#		GP	W	T	L	GF:GA	Pts
1	Kazzinc-Torpedo	3	3	0	0	23:7	6:0
2	Barys Astana	3	2	0	1	13:18	4:2
3	Bulat Temirtau	3	1	0	2	7:10	2:4
4	Yenbek Almaty	3	0	0	3	8:16	0:6
