= 2007–08 Barys Astana season =

Kazakhstani ice hockey season

The 2007–08 Barys Astana season was the 8th season in the Kazakhstan Hockey Championship and their single season in the Supreme League of the Russian Ice Hockey Championship, in parallel.

== Kazakhstan Hockey Championship ==
=== Standings ===
	GP	W	OTW	OTL	L	GF:GA	Pts
Barys Astana	5	4	1	0	0	24:9	14
Gornyak Rudny	5	3	0	2	0	23:16	11
Kazzinc-Torpedo	5	2	2	0	1	16:14	10
Kazakhmys Satpaev	5	2	0	0	3	15:19	6
Yertis Pavlodar	5	1	0	1	3	16:25	4
Saryarka Karagandy	5	0	0	0	5	16:27	0

==== Schedule and results ====
2009 Final Round
Result: 4–0–1–0 Pts. 14 - Barys won the championship

Game	Date	Opponent	Score	Decision	Location	Record	Points	Recap
1	May 1	Gornyak Rudny	3-2 (SO)	Alexei Kuznetsov	Kazakhstan Sports Palace, Astana	0-0-1-0	2	
2	May 2	Yertis Pavlodar	6-2	Alexei Kuznetsov	Kazakhstan Sports Palace, Astana	1-0-1-0	5	
3	May 4	Saryarka Karagandy	5-2	Alexei Kuznetsov	Kazakhstan Sports Palace, Astana	2-0-1-0	8	
4	May 6	Kazzinc-Torpedo	4-1	Alexei Kuznetsov	Kazakhstan Sports Palace, Astana	3-0-1-0	11	
5	May 7	Kazakhmys Satpaev	6-2	Alexei Kuznetsov	Kazakhstan Sports Palace, Astana	4-0-1-0	14	

Win (3 points) Overtime/shootout win (2 points) Overtime/shootout loss (1 point) Loss (0 points)
