= 2006–07 Barys Astana season =

The 2006–07 Barys Astana season was the 8th season in the Kazakhstan Hockey Championship and the 3rd season in the First League of the Russian Ice Hockey Championship, in parallel.

== Kazakhstan Hockey Championship ==
=== Standings ===
	GP	W	OTW	T	OTL	L	GF:GA	Pts
Kazzinc-Torpedo	24	20	3	0	0	1	145:49	66
Kazakhmys Satpaev	24	16	1	0	1	6	119:50	51
Gornyak Rudny	24	13	1	0	3	7	88:81	44
Saryarka Karagandy	24	13	1	1	1	8	118:82	43
Barys Astana	24	9	1	1	1	12	93:76	41
Yertis Pavlodar	24	3	2	0	2	17	58:113	15
Yenbek Almaty	24	0	0	0	1	23	24:194	1
