= 2014–15 Barys Astana season =

2014–15 Barys Astana
- Division: TBD Chernyshev
- Conference: TBD Eastern
- 2014–15 record: TBD
- Home record: TBD
- Road record: TBD
- Goals for: TBD
- Goals against: TBD

Team information
- President: Nurlan Orazbayev
- General manager: Vadim Guseinov
- Coach: Andrei Nazarov
- Captain: Dmitri Upper
- Alternate captains: TBD
- Arena: Kazakhstan Sports Palace

Team leaders
- Goals: TBD
- Assists: TBD
- Points: TBD
- Penalty minutes: TBD
- Plus/minus: TBD
- Wins: TBD
- Goals against average: TBD

The 2014–15 Barys Astana season is the Kontinental Hockey League franchise's 7th season of play and 16th season overall.

== Current roster ==
Updated 1 October 2026.

No.	Nat	Player	Pos	S/G	Age	Acquired	Birthplace
10	(Kazakhstan)	Abzal Alibek	F	L	20	2026	Astana, Kazakhstan
96	(Kazakhstan)	Alikhan Asetov	RW	L	30	2015	Ust-Kamenogorsk, Kazakhstan
8	(United States)	Justin Bailey	RW	R	31	2026	Buffalo, New York, United States
87	(Kazakhstan)	Adil Beketayev	D	L	28	2021	Petropavlovsk, Kazakhstan
7	(Kazakhstan)	Damir Britikov	D	L	19	2026	Temirtau, Kazakhstan
71	(Kazakhstan)	Samat Daniyar (A)	D	R	27	2019	Astana, Kazakhstan
26	(United States)	Logan Day	D	R	32	2026	Seminole, Florida, United States
91	(Kazakhstan)	Madi Dikhanbek	D	L	25	2024	Satpaev, Kazakhstan
13	(Kazakhstan)	Dinmukhamed Kaiyrzhan	F	R	23	2021	Ust-Kamenogorsk, Kazakhstan
12	(Kazakhstan)	Vsevolod Logvin	C	L	22	2023	Ust-Kamenogorsk, Kazakhstan
29	(Kazakhstan)	Kirill Lyapunov	RW	L	21	2024	Rudny, Kazakhstan
2	(Canada)	Jake Massie (A)	D	L	29	2025	St-Lazare, Quebec, Canada
3	(United States)	Ian McCoshen	D	L	31	2025	Anaheim, California, United States
11	(United States)	Mason Morelli (A)	LW	L	30	2025	Minot, North Dakota, United States
81	(Kazakhstan)	Batyrlan Muratov	F	R	27	2022	Astana, Kazakhstan
17	(Kazakhstan)	Alikhan Omirbekov	C	L	25	2023	Satpaev, Kazakhstan
19	(Kazakhstan)	Beibarys Orazov	D	R	21	2024	Ust-Kamenogorsk, Kazakhstan
22	(Kazakhstan)	Kirill Panyukov	LW	R	29	2024	Astana, Kazakhstan
14	(Canada)	Garrett Pilon	C	R	28	2026	Mineola, New York, United States
4	(United States)	Chase Priskie	D	R	30	2026	Pembroke Pines, Florida, United States
84	(Kazakhstan)	Kirill Savitski (C)	LW	L	31	2021	Ust-Kamenogorsk, Kazakhstan
77	(Kazakhstan)	Ansar Shaikhmeddenov	F	L	24	2021	Ust-Kamenogorsk, Kazakhstan
32	(United States)	Hunter Shepard	G	L	30	2026	Cohasset, Minnesota, United States
43	(Kazakhstan)	Andrei Shutov	G	L	28	2024	Ust-Kamenogorsk, Kazakhstan
70	(Kazakhstan)	Semyon Simonov	RW	L	21	2024	Temirtau, Kazakhstan
9	(United States)	Tyce Thompson	F	R	26	2025	Oyster Bay, New York, United States

== Farm teams ==
- Nomad Astana (Kazakhstan Hockey Championship)
- Snezhnye Barsy (Junior Hockey League)

== See also ==
- 2014–15 KHL season
