= Yevgeny Fadeyev =

Kazakhstani ice hockey player

- Born: July 9, 1982 (age 42); Ust-Kamenogorsk, Kazakh SSR, Soviet Union
- Height: 5 ft 10 in (178 cm)
- Weight: 187 lb (85 kg; 13 st 5 lb)
- Position: Defence
- Shot: Left
- Played for: Kazzinc-Torpedo; Gornyak Rudny; Kazakhmys Satpaev; Avtomobilist Yekaterinburg; Nomad Astana; Saryarka Karagandy
- National team: Kazakhstan
- NHL draft: Undrafted
- Playing career: 2003–2018

Evgeni Alexandrovich Fadeev (Russian: Евгений Александрович Фадеев; born 9 July 1982) is a Kazakhstani former ice hockey defenceman. He played six seasons in the Kontinental Hockey League between 2008 and 2014 with Barys Astana. Internationally he played for the Kazakhstan national team at seven World Championships.

== Career statistics ==
			Regular season					Playoffs
Season	Team	League	GP	G	A	Pts	PIM	GP	G	A	Pts	PIM
1999–00	Torpedo Ust-Kamenogorsk-2	Russia3	2	0	1	1	0	—	—	—	—	—
2000–01	Torpedo Ust-Kamenogorsk	Russia3	5	0	0	0	10	—	—	—	—	—
2000–01	Torpedo Ust-Kamenogorsk-2	Russia3	27	0	4	4	26	—	—	—	—	—
2001–02	Torpedo Ust-Kamenogorsk-2	Russia3	34	7	12	19	18	—	—	—	—	—
2002–03	Kazzinc-Torpedo	Russia2	5	2	1	3	2	—	—	—	—	—
2002–03	Torpedo Ust-Kamenogorsk-2	Russia3	43	14	6	20	24	—	—	—	—	—
2003–04	Gornyak Rudny	Kazakhstan	24	3	2	5	20	—	—	—	—	—
2003–04	Gornyak Rudny	Russia3	56	11	9	20	36	—	—	—	—	—
2004–05	Gornyak Rudny	Kazakhstan	10	4	3	7	2	—	—	—	—	—
2004–05	Gornyak Rudny	Russia3	20	7	9	16	12	—	—	—	—	—
2004–05	Kazakhmys Karaganda	Kazakhstan	13	0	2	2	4	—	—	—	—	—
2004–05	Kazakhmys Karaganda	Russia2	31	1	2	3	24	—	—	—	—	—
2005–06	Kazakhmys Karaganda	Kazakhstan	19	3	2	5	2	—	—	—	—	—
2005–06	Kazakhmys Karaganda	Russia2	37	2	4	6	20	—	—	—	—	—
2006–07	Kazakhmys Satpaev	Kazakhstan	10	2	2	4	2	—	—	—	—	—
2006–07	Kazakhmys Satpaev	Russia2	34	1	8	9	24	—	—	—	—	—
2007–08	Barys Astana	Russia2	50	8	11	19	36	7	3	0	3	6
2008–09	Barys Astana	KHL	14	2	0	2	8	3	0	0	0	2
2009–10	Barys Astana-2	Kazakhstan	14	1	1	2	6	—	—	—	—	—
2009–10	Avtomobilist Yekaterinburg	KHL	27	2	2	4	16	4	0	2	2	6
2010–11	Barys Astana	KHL	40	2	3	5	18	4	0	0	0	0
2010–11	Barys Astana-2	Kazakhstan	1	0	0	0	0	—	—	—	—	—
2011–12	Barys Astana	KHL	25	1	3	4	6	4	0	1	1	2
2012–13	Barys Astana	KHL	15	0	2	2	12	6	0	0	0	4
2013–14	Barys Astana	KHL	1	0	0	0	0	—	—	—	—	—
2013–14	Nomad Astana	Kazakhstan	25	5	7	12	14	—	—	—	—	—
2014–15	Nomad Astana	Kazakhstan	10	2	5	7	12	—	—	—	—	—
2014–15	Saryarka Karagandy	VHL	25	0	2	2	4	8	0	3	3	4
2015–16	Torpedo Ust-Kamenogorsk	VHL	44	9	10	19	22	3	0	3	3	6
2016–17	Torpedo Ust-Kamenogorsk	VHL	25	1	5	6	4	19	1	4	5	10
2017–18	Altay-Torpedo Ust-Kamenogorsk	Kazakhstan	29	3	6	9	12	—	—	—	—	—
KHL totals			122	7	10	17	60	21	0	3	3	14
Russia2 totals			157	14	26	40	106	7	3	0	3	6
Kazakhstan totals			155	23	30	53	74	—	—	—	—	—
