= 2005 Kazakhstan Hockey Cup =

The 2005 Kazakhstan Hockey Cup was the 4th edition of the Kazakhstan Hockey Cup, the national ice hockey cup competition in Kazakhstan. Six teams participated and Kazakhmys Karagandy won its 1st Cup.

== Results ==
	GP	W	T	L	GF:GA	Pts
Kazakhmys Karagandy	5	4	1	0	24:6	9
Kazzinc-Torpedo	5	3	2	0	14:8	8
Gornyak Rudny	5	2	2	1	19:15	6
Barys Astana	5	2	1	2	11:15	5
Yertis Pavlodar	5	1	0	4	6:18	2
Yenbek Almaty	5	0	0	5	9:21	0
