= 2008 Kazakhstan Hockey Cup =

The 2008 Kazakhstan Hockey Cup was the seventh edition of the national ice hockey cup competition in Kazakhstan. Six teams participated and Kazakhmys Satpaev won its third cup.

== Results ==
| | GP | W | OTW | OTL | L | GF:GA | Pts |
|---|---|---|---|---|---|---|---|
| Kazakhmys Satpaev | 5 | 5 | 0 | 0 | 0 | 38:7 | 15 |
| Saryarka Karagandy | 5 | 3 | 0 | 0 | 2 | 30:8 | 9 |
| Gornyak Rudny | 5 | 3 | 0 | 0 | 2 | 25:9 | 9 |
| Kazzinc-Torpedo-2 | 5 | 3 | 0 | 0 | 2 | 29:13 | 9 |
| Yenbek Almaty | 5 | 1 | 0 | 0 | 4 | 7:36 | 3 |
| Barys Astana-2 | 5 | 0 | 0 | 0 | 5 | 4:60 | 0 |
