= Roman Starchenko =

Kazakhstani ice hockey player (born 1986)

- Born: May 12, 1986 (age 40) Ust-Kamenogorsk, Kazakh SSR, Soviet Union
- Height: 5 ft 10 in (178 cm)
- Weight: 190 lb (86 kg; 13 st 8 lb)
- Position: Center
- Shot: Left
- Played for: Barys Astana; Spartak Moscow
- National team: Kazakhstan
- Playing career: 2003–2026

Roman Leonidovich Starchenko (Russian: Роман Леонидович Старченко; born May 12, 1986) is a Kazakhstani former professional ice hockey centre.

== Playing career ==
Like most Kazakhstani professionals, Starchenko has played in the Torpedo Ust-Kamenogorsk system. He spent 2003-04 with Barys Astana in the Kazakhstan Hockey Championship, scoring 11 goals in his first season of senior pro hockey, and then played the next four seasons with Kazzinc-Torpedo. He had a 14-goal, 25-point season in 2006-07, and was signed by Barys Astana in 2008. He finished his first KHL season with 5 goals and 16 points.

Following 14 seasons in the KHL playing exclusively within Barys, Starchenko left the club as a free agent and was signed to a one-year contract to join Russian club, HC Spartak Moscow, for the 2022–23 season on 18 July 2022. In his lone season with Spartak, Starchenko notched 7 goals and 15 points through 52 regular season games.

On 1 July 2023, Starchenko as a free agent opted to return to original club, Barys Astana, agreeing to a one-year contract for the 2023–24 season.

== Career statistics ==
=== Regular season and playoffs ===
			Regular season					Playoffs
Season	Team	League	GP	G	A	Pts	PIM	GP	G	A	Pts	PIM
2003–04	Barys Astana	KAZ	16	11	7	18	18	—	—	—	—	—
2004–05	Kazzinc-Torpedo	VHL	24	2	2	4	6	—	—	—	—	—
2004–05	Kazzinc-Torpedo	KAZ	18	3	3	6	4	—	—	—	—	—
2005–06	Kazzinc-Torpedo	VHL	33	8	5	13	14	—	—	—	—	—
2005–06	Kazzinc-Torpedo	KAZ	20	6	1	7	8	—	—	—	—	—
2006–07	Kazzinc-Torpedo	VHL	25	4	2	6	26	—	—	—	—	—
2006–07	Kazzinc-Torpedo	KAZ	20	14	11	25	14	—	—	—	—	—
2007–08	Kazzinc-Torpedo	VHL	45	9	6	15	28	8	8	1	9	10
2008–09	Barys Astana	KHL	56	5	11	16	14	3	0	0	0	2
2009–10	Barys Astana	KHL	43	7	0	7	6	—	—	—	—	—
2010–11	Barys Astana	KHL	48	11	10	21	33	4	1	0	1	0
2011–12	Barys Astana	KHL	45	12	14	26	41	7	0	1	1	0
2012–13	Barys Astana	KHL	41	13	8	21	4	6	1	1	2	2
2013–14	Barys Astana	KHL	53	18	17	35	24	10	4	0	4	10
2014–15	Barys Astana	KHL	51	22	12	34	16	7	2	0	2	8
2015–16	Barys Astana	KHL	41	16	9	25	16	—	—	—	—	—
2016–17	Barys Astana	KHL	51	15	11	26	53	10	1	0	1	6
2017–18	Barys Astana	KHL	39	11	9	20	28	—	—	—	—	—
2018–19	Barys Astana	KHL	56	18	21	39	18	5	1	1	2	4
2019–20	Barys Nur-Sultan	KHL	53	18	17	35	10	5	0	0	0	2
2020–21	Barys Nur-Sultan	KHL	59	13	19	32	14	6	2	1	3	6
2021–22	Barys Nur-Sultan	KHL	41	9	15	24	35	—	—	—	—	—
2022–23	Spartak Moscow	KHL	52	7	8	15	43	—	—	—	—	—
2023–24	Barys Astana	KHL	43	4	15	19	16	—	—	—	—	—
2024–25	Barys Astana	KHL	27	4	8	12	4	—	—	—	—	—
2025–26	Barys Astana	KHL	9	0	1	1	0	—	—	—	—	—
2025–26	Nomad Astana	KAZ	18	8	12	20	31	15	4	7	11	4
KHL totals			808	203	205	408	375	63	12	4	16	40

Medal record

Representing Kazakhstan

Ice hockey

Asian Games
Gold medal – first place	2011 Astana-Almaty	Ice hockey
Gold medal – first place	2025 Harbin	Ice hockey

=== International ===
Year	Team	Event	GP	G	A	Pts	PIM
2004	Kazakhstan	U18-I	5	2	0	2	4
2005	Kazakhstan	WJC-I	5	5	1	6	0
2006	Kazakhstan	WJC-I	5	3	3	6	8
2006	Kazakhstan	WC	3	2	0	2	0
2008	Kazakhstan	WC-I	5	0	1	1	25
2009	Kazakhstan	OGQ	6	3	3	6	2
2009	Kazakhstan	WC-I	5	4	2	6	2
2010	Kazakhstan	WC	6	2	0	2	2
2011	Kazakhstan	AWG	4	10	7	17	2
2011	Kazakhstan	WC-I	5	2	2	4	2
2012	Kazakhstan	WC	2	0	2	2	0
2013	Kazakhstan	OGQ	3	0	3	3	0
2013	Kazakhstan	WC-IA	5	5	2	7	2
2014	Kazakhstan	WC	7	2	0	2	4
2015	Kazakhstan	WC-IA	5	4	2	6	6
2016	Kazakhstan	WC	4	2	1	3	4
2016	Kazakhstan	OGQ	3	3	0	3	4
2017	Kazakhstan	WC-IA	5	0	2	2	0
2018	Kazakhstan	WC-IA	5	6	2	8	4
2020	Kazakhstan	OGQ	3	1	1	2	0
2021	Kazakhstan	WC	7	3	4	7	0
2022	Kazakhstan	WC	7	2	3	5	0
2023	Kazakhstan	WC	7	1	4	5	0
2024	Kazakhstan	WC	7	3	2	5	0
2024	Kazakhstan	OGQ	3	0	1	1	2
2025	Kazakhstan	AWG	8	9	8	17	0
2025	Kazakhstan	WC	7	1	2	3	2
2026	Kazakhstan	WC-IA	5	2	0	2	0
Junior totals			15	10	4	14	12
Senior totals			127	67	54	121	63
