= 2001–02 Kazakhstan Hockey Championship =

- League: Kazakhstan Hockey Championship
- Sport: Ice Hockey
- Number of teams: 7

Regular season
- Champions: Kazzinc-Torpedo
- Runners-up: Barys Astana

Kazakhstan Hockey Championship seasons
- ← 2000–01 2002–03 →

The 2001–02 Kazakhstan Hockey Championship was the tenth season of the Kazakhstan Hockey Championship, the top level of ice hockey in Kazakhstan. Seven teams participated in the league, and Kazzinc-Torpedo won the championship. Yertis Pavlodar dropped out of the league before the season began.

== Standings ==
	GP	W	T	L	GF:GA	Pts
Kazzinc-Torpedo	24	23	0	1	244:46	46:2
Barys Astana	24	17	1	6	144:64	35:13
Gornyak Rudny	24	17	1	6	139:42	35:13
Yenbek Almaty	24	12	0	12	114:101	24:24
CSKA Temirtau	24	9	0	15	94:130	18:30
Yessil Petropavlovsk	24	4	1	19	33:205	9:39
Yunost Karagandy	24	0	1	23	24:204	1:47
Yertis Pavlodar	–	–	–	–	–:–	–:–
