= 1998–99 Kazakhstan Hockey Championship =

- League: Kazakhstan Hockey Championship
- Sport: Ice Hockey
- Number of teams: 4

Finals
- Champions: Bulat Temirtau
- Runners-up: Avtomobilist Karagandy

Kazakhstan Hockey Championship seasons
- ← 1997–98 1999–2000 →

The 1998–99 Kazakhstan Hockey Championship was the seventh season of the Kazakhstan Hockey Championship, the top level of ice hockey in Kazakhstan. Four teams participated in the league, and Bulat Temirtau won the championship.

== Regular season ==
	GP	W	T	L	GF:GA	Pts
Bulat Temirtau	3	3	0	0	50:9	6:0
Avtomobilist Karagandy	3	2	0	1	38:18	4:2
Amid Rudny	3	1	0	2	14:39	2:4
Zhenis Astana	3	0	0	3	9:45	0:6

== Final round ==
=== Final ===
- Bulat Temirtau 10 Avtomobilist Karagandy 6

=== 3rd place ===
- Amid Rudny 5 Zhenis Astana 4
