= Viktor Alexandrov =

Kazakhstani ice hockey player

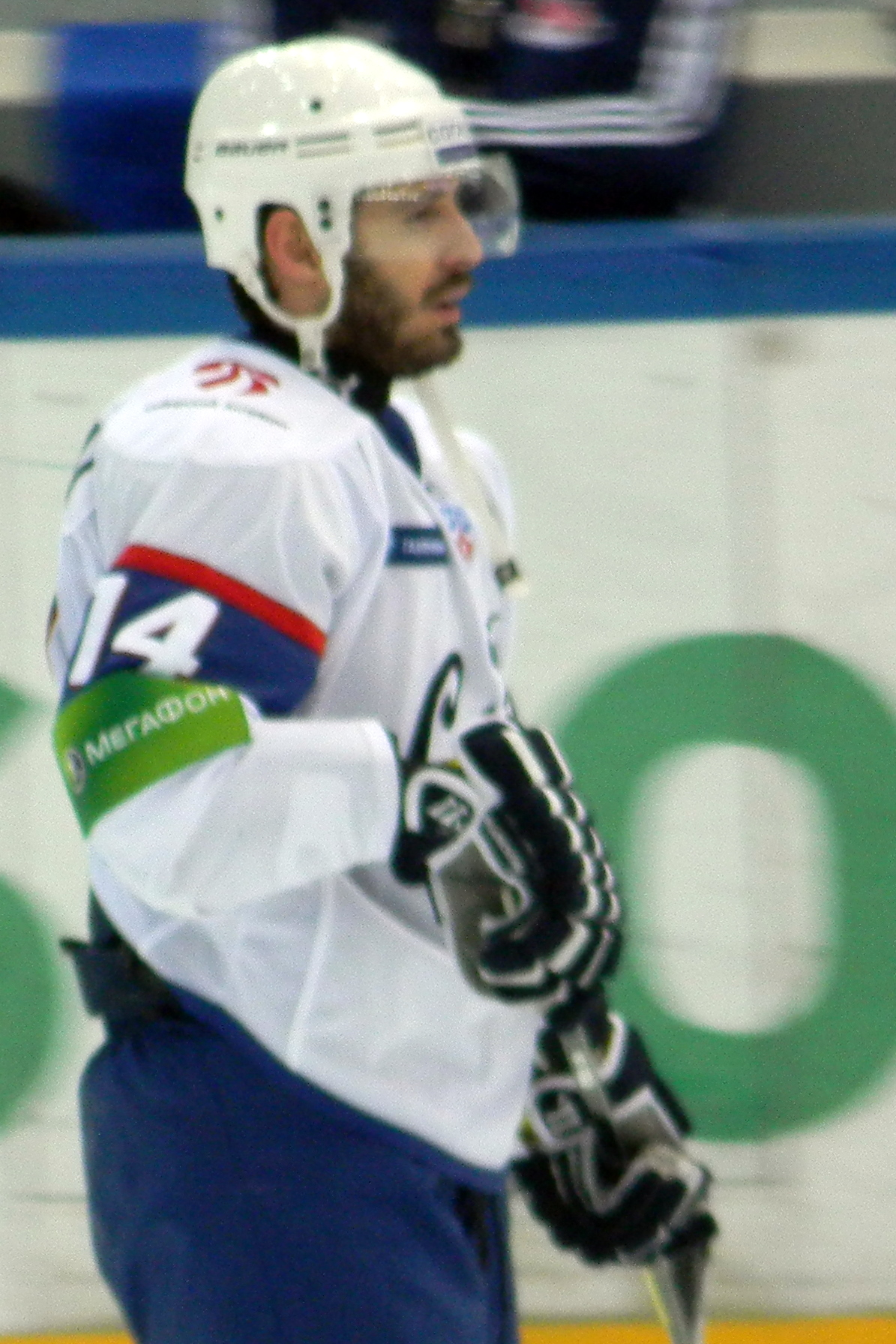
- Alexandrov as a Sibir Novosibirsk player in 2012.
- Born: December 28, 1985 (age 40) Aktyubinsk, Kazakh SSR, USSR
- Height: 6 ft 0 in (183 cm)
- Weight: 176 lb (80 kg; 12 st 8 lb)
- Position: Right wing
- Shot: Left
- Played for: Kazzinc-Torpedo; Lokomotiv Yaroslavl; Metallurg Novokuznetsk; SKA Saint Petersburg; HC MVD; Torpedo Nizhny Novgorod; Avangard Omsk; Traktor Chelyabinsk; Amur Khabarovsk; Sibir Novosibirsk; Barys Astana; Admiral Vladivostok
- National team: Kazakhstan
- NHL draft: 83rd overall, 2004; St. Louis Blues
- Playing career: 1999–2018

Viktor Borisovich Alexandrov (Cyrillic: Виктор Борисович Александров; born 28 December 1985) is a Kazakhstani former professional ice hockey player. He last played with Admiral Vladivostok in the Kontinental Hockey League (KHL). Alexandrov was drafted 83rd overall by the St. Louis Blues in the 2004 NHL entry draft, but he never signed a contract and remained in Russia.

== Playing career ==
At the age of 15, Alexandrov became the youngest player to score in the World Junior Ice Hockey Championship. He signed with Metallurg Novokuznetsk in the Russian Superleague. He then moved to SKA Saint Petersburg in 2005, following Metallurg's former head coach. However, there he struggled to make a difference and prove himself and left to join HC MVD. He then returned to Metallurg and enjoyed a career high 2007–08 season where he scored 20 goals and 43 points in 55 games. Alexandrov signed with Avangard Omsk for the inaugural KHL season in 2008–09.

== Personal ==
He is the son of Soviet hockey star Boris Alexandrov who played for the Team USSR.

== Career statistics ==
=== Regular season and playoffs ===
			Regular season					Playoffs
Season	Team	League	GP	G	A	Pts	PIM	GP	G	A	Pts	PIM
1999–2000	Torpedo–2 Ust–Kamenogorsk	RUS.3	3	1	0	1	2	—	—	—	—	—
2000–01	Kazzinc–Torpedo	KAZ
2000–01	Kazzinc–Torpedo	RUS.3	45	36	20	56	38	—	—	—	—	—
2001–02	Kazzinc–Torpedo	RUS.2	45	12	17	29	48	—	—	—	—	—
2001–02	Torpedo–2 Ust–Kamenogorsk	RUS.3	3	0	1	1	18	—	—	—	—	—
2002–03	Lokomotiv Yaroslavl	RSL	2	0	0	0	2	—	—	—	—	—
2002–03	Lokomotiv–2 Yaroslavl	RUS.3	8	5	5	10	4	—	—	—	—	—
2002–03	Energiya Kemerovo	RUS.2	15	2	4	6	12	—	—	—	—	—
2002–03	Energiya–2 Kemerovo	RUS.3	1	0	0	0	6	—	—	—	—	—
2002–03	Metallurg Novokuznetsk	RSL	11	0	0	0	4	—	—	—	—	—
2003–04	Metallurg Novokuznetsk	RSL	57	5	4	9	24	4	1	1	2	4
2003–04	Metallurg–2 Novokuznetsk	RUS.3	2	3	3	6	0	—	—	—	—	—
2004–05	Metallurg Novokuznetsk	RSL	50	8	10	18	16	4	1	1	2	0
2004–05	Metallurg–2 Novokuznetsk	RUS.3	1	0	0	0	2	—	—	—	—	—
2005–06	SKA St. Petersburg	RSL	41	4	6	10	53	—	—	—	—	—
2005–06	SKA–2 St. Petersburg	RUS.3	5	1	6	7	4	—	—	—	—	—
2006–07	SKA St. Petersburg	RSL	19	1	10	11	18	—	—	—	—	—
2006–07	SKA–2 St. Petersburg	RUS.3	5	2	7	9	12	—	—	—	—	—
2006–07	HC MVD	RSL	20	2	6	8	8	2	0	2	2	0
2007–08	Metallurg Novokuznetsk	RSL	55	20	24	44	26	—	—	—	—	—
2008–09	Avangard Omsk	KHL	35	2	8	10	18	8	2	0	2	8
2009–10	Torpedo Nizhny Novgorod	KHL	55	11	14	25	34	—	—	—	—	—
2010–11	Traktor Chelyabinsk	KHL	14	3	2	5	4	—	—	—	—	—
2010–11	Mechel Chelyabinsk	VHL	2	0	0	0	0	—	—	—	—	—
2010–11	Barys Astana	KHL	11	1	1	2	10	4	0	0	0	2
2011–12	Amur Khabarovsk	KHL	15	3	3	6	0	—	—	—	—	—
2011–12	Sibir Novosibirsk	KHL	11	2	2	4	4	—	—	—	—	—
2012–13	Barys Astana	KHL	25	2	5	7	8	4	0	0	0	4
2015–16	Admiral Vladivostok	KHL	37	3	9	12	20	4	0	0	0	4
2016–17	Admiral Vladivostok	KHL	38	7	4	11	30	6	0	2	2	4
2017–18	Admiral Vladivostok	KHL	37	11	11	22	47	—	—	—	—	—
RSL totals			255	40	60	100	151	10	2	4	6	6
KHL totals			278	48	56	104	175	26	2	2	4	22

=== International ===
Year	Team	Event	GP	G	A	Pts	PIM
2000	Kazakhstan	EJC D1	4	2	0	2	0
2001	Kazakhstan	WJC	6	2	1	3	4
2001	Kazakhstan	WJC18 D1	5	3	1	4	6
2001	Kazakhstan	WC D1	5	3	2	5	0
2002	Kazakhstan	WJC D1	5	6	5	11	4
2002	Kazakhstan	WJC18 D1	4	6	3	9	8
2002	Kazakhstan	WC D1	5	2	8	10	6
2013	Kazakhstan	OGQ	3	1	2	3	0
2013	Kazakhstan	WC D1A	5	1	3	4	6
Junior totals			24	19	10	29	22
Senior totals			18	7	15	22	12
