= 2007–08 Kazakhstan Hockey Championship =

- League: Republic of Kazakhstan Open Ice Hockey Championship
- Sport: Ice hockey
- Duration: August 22, 2007 – May 7, 2008
- Number of teams: 10

Regular season
- Champions: Barys Astana
- Runners-up: Gornyak Rudny

Kazakhstan Hockey Championship seasons
- ← 2006–07 2008–09 →

The 2007–08 Kazakhstan Hockey Championship was the 16th season of the Kazakhstan Hockey Championship, the top level of ice hockey in Kazakhstan. Ten teams participated in the league, and Barys Astana won the championship.

== Standings ==
=== First round ===
| | GP | W | OTW | T | OTL | L | GF:GA | Pts |
|---|---|---|---|---|---|---|---|---|
| Yertis Pavlodar | 24 | 21 | 0 | 0 | 0 | 3 | 120:42 | 63 |
| Gornyak Rudny | 24 | 19 | 0 | 0 | 0 | 5 | 123:48 | 57 |
| Saryarka Karagandy | 24 | 16 | 0 | 1 | 0 | 7 | 132:69 | 49 |
| Kazzinc-Torpedo-2 | 24 | 11 | 2 | 0 | 0 | 11 | 65:69 | 37 |
| Yenbek Almaty | 24 | 5 | 0 | 1 | 2 | 16 | 59:131 | 18 |
| Barys Astana-2 | 24 | 4 | 1 | 0 | 0 | 19 | 40:149 | 14 |
| Kazakhmys Satpaev-2 | 24 | 3 | 0 | 2 | 1 | 18 | 41:78 | 12 |

=== Final round ===
| | GP | W | OTW | OTL | L | GF:GA | Pts |
|---|---|---|---|---|---|---|---|
| Barys Astana | 5 | 4 | 1 | 0 | 0 | 24:9 | 14 |
| Gornyak Rudny | 5 | 3 | 0 | 2 | 0 | 23:16 | 11 |
| Kazzinc-Torpedo | 5 | 2 | 2 | 0 | 1 | 16:14 | 10 |
| Kazakhmys Satpaev | 5 | 2 | 0 | 0 | 3 | 15:19 | 6 |
| Yertis Pavlodar | 5 | 1 | 0 | 1 | 3 | 16:25 | 4 |
| Saryarka Karagandy | 5 | 0 | 0 | 0 | 5 | 16:27 | 0 |
