= 2002–03 Kazakhstan Hockey Championship =

- League: Kazakhstan Hockey Championship
- Sport: Ice Hockey
- Number of teams: 7

Regular season
- Champions: Kazzinc-Torpedo
- Runners-up: Kazakhmys Karagandy

Kazakhstan Hockey Championship seasons
- ← 2001–02 2003–04 →

The 2002–03 Kazakhstan Hockey Championship was the 11th season of the Kazakhstan Hockey Championship, the top level of ice hockey in Kazakhstan. Seven teams participated in the league, and Kazzinc-Torpedo won the championship.

== Standings ==
	GP	W	T	L	GF:GA	Pts
Kazzinc-Torpedo	24	23	1	0	224:26	47:1
Kazakhmys Karagandy	24	17	2	5	138:62	36:12
Yenbek Almaty	24	14	2	8	103:70	30:18
Gornyak Rudny	24	11	2	11	106:85	24:24
Barys Astana	24	10	3	11	124:102	23:25
CSKA Temirtau	24	4	0	20	62:165	8:40
Yessil Petropavlovsk	24	0	0	24	31:278	0:48
