= Ustinka Ust-Kamenogorsk =

Ustinka Ust-Kamenogorsk was an ice hockey team in Oskemen, Kazakhstan. They participated in the Kazakhstan Hockey Championship during the 2003–04 season. Ustinka finished in seventh place in the regular season.
