= 2025–26 Kazakhstan Hockey Championship =

- League: Kazakhstan Hockey Championship
- Sport: Ice Hockey
- Duration: 7 September 2025 – 12 April 2026
- Teams: 10

Regular season
- Winners: Nomad Astana
- Top scorer: Valeri Gurin (Gornyak Rudny) (76 points)

Finals
- Champions: Nomad Astana
- Runners-up: Saryarka Karagandy

Kazakhstan Hockey Championship seasons
- ← 2024–25 2026–27 →

The 2025–26 Kazakhstan Hockey Championship, known as the Pro Hokei Ligasy, was the 34th season since the founding of the Kazakhstan Hockey Championship. The regular season started on 7 September 2025.

== Teams ==
The league consists of 10 teams after Uzbek side Humo Tashkent withdrew from the league.

Locations of the Kazakhstan Hockey Championship teams

Team	City	Arena	Capacity
HC Aktobe	Aktobe	Aktobe Sports Palace	2,348
HC Almaty	Almaty	Baluan Sholak Sports Palace	5,000
Arlan Kokshetau	Kokshetau	Burabay Sports Palace	1,500
Beibarys Atyrau	Atyrau	Khiuaz Dospanova Ice Palace	800
Gornyak Rudny	Rudny	Ice Sports Palace Rudny	1,500
Kulager Petropavl	Petropavl	Alexander Vinokurov Sports Palace	1,000
Nomad Astana	Astana	Kazakhstan Sports Palace	4,070
Saryarka Karagandy	Karaganda	Karagandy-Arena	5,500
Torpedo HC	Oskemen	Boris Alexandrov Sports Palace	4,400
Yertis Pavlodar	Pavlodar	Astana Ice Palace	3,000

== Regular season ==
=== Standings ===
Pos	Team	Pld	W	OTW	OTL	L	GF	GA	GD	Pts	Qualification
1	Nomad Astana	54	39	3	2	10	227	118	+109	86	Direct playoff qualification
2	HC Torpedo	54	38	2	4	10	236	94	+142	84	Direct playoff qualification
3	Saryarka Karagandy	54	33	6	5	10	233	121	+112	83	Direct playoff qualification
4	Arlan Kokshetau	54	26	8	5	15	173	138	+35	73	Direct playoff qualification
5	Kulager Petropavl	54	27	7	3	17	184	125	+59	71	Direct playoff qualification
6	Gornyak Rudny	54	22	2	9	21	176	166	+10	57	Direct playoff qualification
7	Beibarys Atyrau	54	18	6	4	26	157	169	−12	52	Direct playoff qualification
8	HC Almaty	54	12	8	6	28	140	180	−40	46	Direct playoff qualification
9	HC Aktobe	54	8	2	4	40	101	210	−109	24	
10	Yertis Pavlodar	54	3	0	2	49	68	374	−306	8	

== Playoffs ==
Quarterfinals
1	Nomad Astana	4
8	HC Almaty	3
2	HC Torpedo	4
7	Beibarys Atyrau	0
3	Saryarka Karagandy	4
6	Gornyak Rudny	1
4	Arlan Kokshetau	1
5	Kulager Petropavl	4

Semifinals
1	Nomad Astana	4
5	Kulager Petropavl	1
2	HC Torpedo	1
3	Saryarka Karagandy	4

Finals
1	Nomad Astana	4
3	Saryarka Karagandy	1
Third place
2	HC Torpedo	3
5	Kulager Petropavl	0
