= 1999–2000 Kazakhstan Hockey Championship =

- League: Kazakhstan Hockey Championship
- Sport: Ice Hockey
- Number of teams: 9

Regular season
- Champions: Torpedo Ust-Kamenogorsk
- Runners-up: Barys Astana

Kazakhstan Hockey Championship seasons
- ← 1998–99 2000–01 →

The 1999–2000 Kazakhstan Hockey Championship was the eighth season of the Kazakhstan Hockey Championship, the top level of ice hockey in Kazakhstan. Nine teams participated, with Torpedo Ust-Kamenogorsk winning the championship.

== First round ==
	GP	W	T	L	GF:GA	Pts
Bulat Temirtau	17	16	0	1	191:71	32:2
Barys Astana	17	11	0	6	160:107	22:12
Yenbek Almaty	17	9	1	7	136:110	19:15
Avangard Petropavlovsk	17	9	1	7	113:113	19:15
Avtomobilist Karagandy	12	5	0	7	69:80	10:14
Amid Rudny	12	5	0	7	74:87	10:14
Magnitka Temirtau	17	2	0	15	71:191	4:30
Yunost Karagandy	7	0	0	7	14:69	0:14

== Final round ==
	GP	W	T	L	GF:GA	Pts
Torpedo Ust-Kamenogorsk	3	3	0	0	23:7	6:0
Barys Astana	3	2	0	1	13:18	4:2
Bulat Temirtau	3	1	0	2	7:10	2:4
Yenbek Almaty	3	0	0	3	8:16	0:6
