= 2000–01 Kazakhstan Hockey Championship =

- League: Kazakhstan Hockey Championship
- Sport: Ice Hockey
- Number of teams: 7

Regular season
- Champions: Kazzinc-Torpedo
- Runners-up: Barys Astana

Kazakhstan Hockey Championship seasons
- ← 1999–2000 2001–02 →

The 2000–01 Kazakhstan Hockey Championship was the ninth season of the Kazakhstan Hockey Championship, the top level of ice hockey in Kazakhstan. Seven teams participated in the league, and Kazzinc-Torpedo won the championship.

== Standings ==
	GP	W	T	L	GF:GA	Pts
Kazzinc-Torpedo	24	22	0	2	241:63	44:4
Barys Astana	24	19	0	5	188:80	38:10
CSKA Temirtau	24	16	2	6	148:123	34:14
Yenbek Almaty	24	10	3	11	83:126	23:25
Yessil Petropavlovsk	22	6	0	16	64:142	12:32
Yunost Karagandy	24	3	1	20	82:218	7:41
Gornyak Rudny	22	3	0	19	46:129	6:38
