= Magnitka Temirtau =

Former ice hockey team in Kazakhstan

Magnitka Temirtau was an ice hockey team in Temirtau, Kazakhstan. They participated in the Kazakhstan Hockey Championship during the 1999–2000 season. Magnitka finished in seventh place in the first round.
