= 2003–04 Kazakhstan Hockey Championship =

- League: Kazakhstan Hockey Championship
- Sport: Ice Hockey
- Number of teams: 7

Regular season
- Champions: Kazzinc-Torpedo
- Runners-up: Gornyak Rudny

Kazakhstan Hockey Championship seasons
- ← 2002–03 2004–05 →

The 2003–04 Kazakhstan Hockey Championship was the 12th season of the Kazakhstan Hockey Championship, the top level of ice hockey in Kazakhstan. Seven teams participated in the league, and Kazzinc-Torpedo won the championship.

== Standings ==
	GP	W	T	L	GF:GA	Pts
Kazzinc-Torpedo	24	22	1	1	226:32	45:3
Gornyak Rudny	24	18	1	5	152:59	37:11
Kazakhmys Karagandy	24	17	2	5	163:47	36:12
Yenbek Almaty	24	11	2	11	131:86	24:24
Barys Astana	24	6	1	17	81:171	13:35
CSKA Temirtau	24	6	0	18	66:198	12:36
Ustinka Ust-Kamenogorsk	24	0	1	23	39:262	1:47
