= Alexei Ishmametyev =

Russian ice hockey player

- Born: June 17, 1988 (age 36); Magnitogorsk, Soviet Union
- Height: 6 ft 0 in (183 cm)
- Weight: 187 lb (85 kg; 13 st 5 lb)
- Position: Defence
- Shoots: Left
- KAZ team Former teams: Yertis Pavlodar; Metallurg Magnitogorsk; HC MVD; HC Dmitrov; Neftyanik Almetievsk; Barys Astana; Nomad Astana; Arlan Kokshetau; Dizel Penza; Yermak Angarsk; Molot-Prikamye Perm
- NHL draft: Undrafted
- Playing career: 2010–present

Alexei Viktorovich Ishmametyev (Russian: Алексей Викторович Ишмаметьев; born June 17, 1988) is a Russian professional ice hockey defenceman. He currently plays for Yertis Pavlodar of the Kazakhstan Hockey Championship.
