= Nikolai Skladnichenko =

Russian professional ice hockey forward (born 1994)

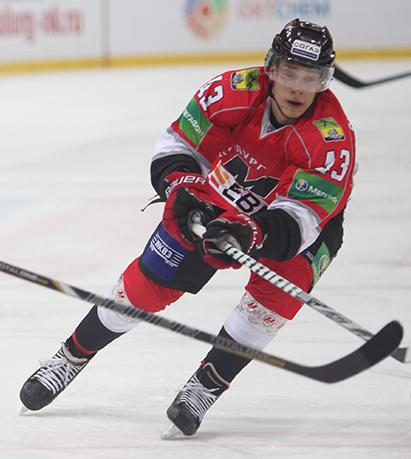
- Born: July 13, 1994 (age 31) Moscow, Russia
- Height: 6 ft 0 in (183 cm)
- Weight: 198 lb (90 kg; 14 st 2 lb)
- Position: Centre
- Shoots: Left
- Allsv team Former teams: Kristianstads IK; Metallurg Novokuznetsk; Amur Khabarovsk
- NHL draft: Undrafted
- Playing career: 2012–present

Nikolai Skladnichenko (born July 13, 1994) is a Russian professional ice hockey forward. He is currently playing with Nybro Vikings IF of the HockeyAllsvenskan.

== Playing career ==
Skladnichenko first played junior in North America with the Bobcaygeon Bucks of the Greater Toronto Midget Hockey League. Skladnichenko returned to Russia and made his Kontinental Hockey League debut playing with Metallurg Novokuznetsk during the 2012–13 KHL season.

On July 23, 2015, Skladnichenko returned to North America to pursue a professional career, signing a one-year American Hockey League contract with the Toronto Marlies. After attending the Marlies training camp for the 2015–16 season, Skladnichenko was unable to make the roster and was re-assigned to attend the training camp of ECHL affiliate, the Orlando Solar Bears. On October 12, 2015, with little interest to play in the third tier ECHL, Skladnichenko mutually agreed to terminate his contract with the Toronto Marlies in order to return to Russia.

After his return to Russia, Skladnichenko's rights were traded by Metallurg Novokuznetsk to Amur Khabarovsk on November 5, 2015. He later signed a two-year contract with Amur and belatedly began the season in Khabarovsk to appear in 16 games for 7 points.

During his ninth professional season in Russia, Skladnichenko played just two games with Rubin Tyumen in the VHL before opting to move abroad to Sweden, appearing with Olofströms IK in the Hockeyettan before finishing the 2019–20 season with Kristianstads IK in the HockeyAllsvenskan (Allsv).

As a free agent, Skladnichenko returned to North America for the pandemic delayed 2020–21 season, pending his immigration status he was added to the opening roster of the Orlando Solar Bears of the ECHL on 10 December 2020.
