= 2004–05 Kazakhstan Hockey Championship =

- League: Kazakhstan Hockey Championship
- Sport: Ice Hockey
- Number of teams: 8

Regular season
- Champions: Kazzinc-Torpedo
- Runners-up: Kazakhmys Karagandy

Kazakhstan Hockey Championship seasons
- ← 2003–04 2005–06 →

The 2004–05 Kazakhstan Hockey Championship was the 13th season of the Kazakhstan Hockey Championship, the top level of ice hockey in Kazakhstan. Eight teams participated in the league, and Kazzinc-Torpedo won the championship.

== Standings ==
	GP	W	OTW	T	OTL	L	GF:GA	Pts
Kazzinc-Torpedo	28	25	0	1	0	2	137:27	76
Kazakhmys Karagandy	28	23	1	0	0	4	159:44	71
Gornyak Rudny	28	19	0	1	1	7	143:63	59
Barys Astana	28	13	0	1	1	13	64:78	41
Yenbek Almaty	28	11	0	2	0	15	84:87	35
Yertis Pavlodar	28	11	0	1	0	16	80:85	34
Kazakhmys Karagandy-2	28	5	1	0	0	22	62:148	17
CSKA Temirtau	28	0	0	0	0	28	22:219	0
