= Cohasset, Minnesota =

City in Minnesota, United States

Cohasset
- City
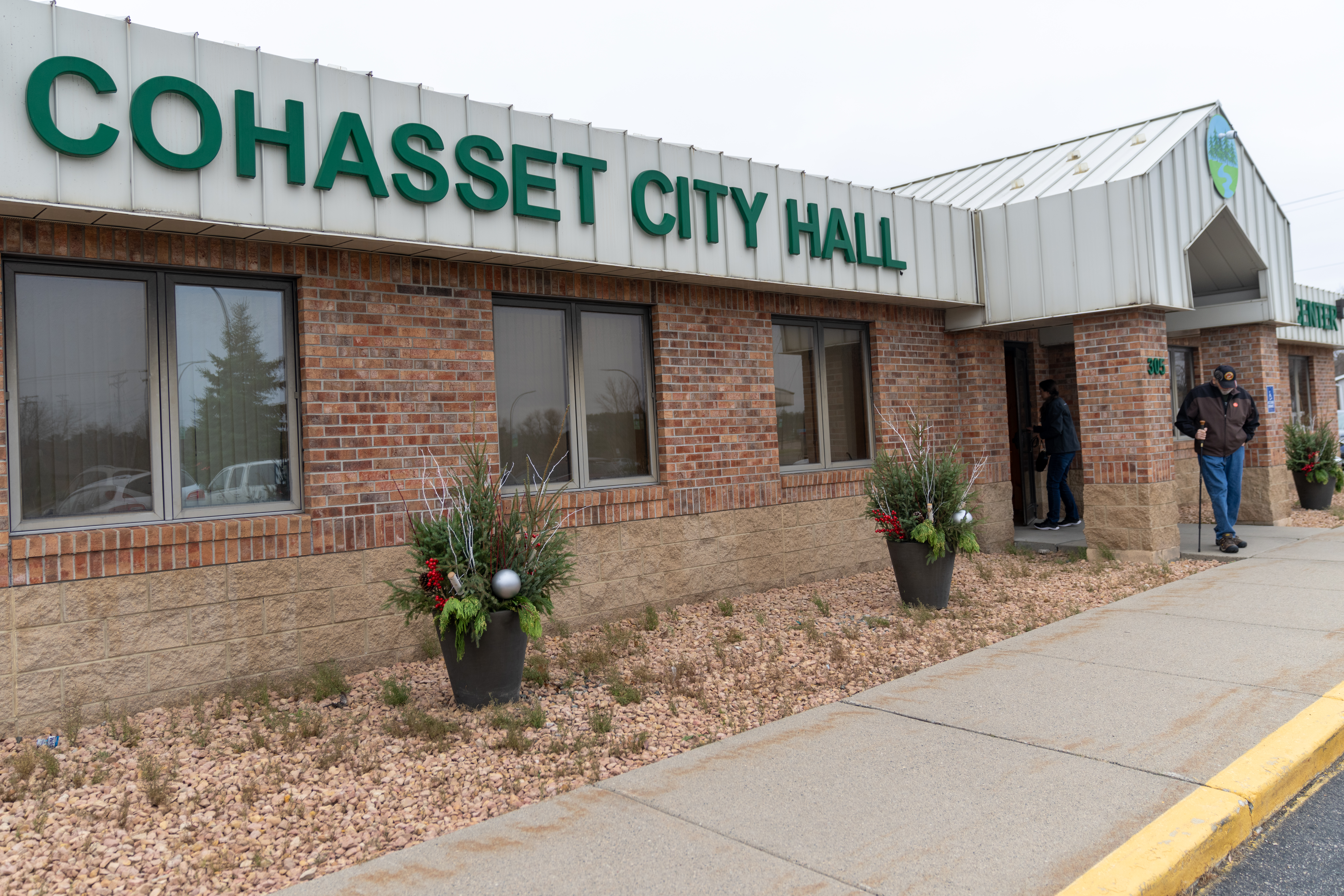
- Cohasset City Hall, Election Day 2024

- Location of the city of Cohasset within Itasca County, Minnesota
- Coordinates: 47°15′7″N 93°37′25″W
- Country: United States
- State: Minnesota
- County: Itasca

Area
  - Total: 35.24 sq mi (91.27 km^{2})
  - Land: 26.88 sq mi (69.62 km^{2})
  - Water: 8.36 sq mi (21.65 km^{2})
- Elevation: 1,283 ft (391 m)

Population (2020)
  - Total: 2,689
  - Density: 100.0/sq mi (38.62/km^{2})
- Time zone: UTC-6 (Central (CST))
  - Summer (DST): UTC-5 (CDT)
- ZIP code: 55721
- Area code: 218
- FIPS code: 27-12412
- GNIS feature ID: 0655774
- Website: www.cohasset-mn.com

Cohasset (/koʊˈhæsət/ koh-HASS-ət) is a city in Itasca County, Minnesota, United States. The population was 2,689 at the 2020 census.

U.S. Highway 2 serves as a main route in Cohasset.

== History ==
A post office called Cohasset has been in operation since 1892. The city was named after Cohasset, Massachusetts.

== Geography ==
According to the United States Census Bureau, the city has an area of 35.29 square miles (91.40 km^{2}), of which 26.81 square miles (69.44 km^{2}) is land and 8.48 square miles (21.96 km^{2}) is water. It is the westernmost point of Minnesota's Iron Range.

Cohasset is adjacent to the city of Grand Rapids.

=== Climate ===
Climate data for Cohasset, Minnesota, 1991–2020 normals, extremes 1895–present
Month	Jan	Feb	Mar	Apr	May	Jun	Jul	Aug	Sep	Oct	Nov	Dec	Year
Record high °F (°C)	53 (12)	60 (16)	81 (27)	92 (33)	101 (38)	98 (37)	103 (39)	98 (37)	99 (37)	88 (31)	73 (23)	60 (16)	103 (39)
Mean maximum °F (°C)	36.3 (2.4)	44.6 (7.0)	58.0 (14.4)	71.5 (21.9)	83.0 (28.3)	86.8 (30.4)	88.1 (31.2)	87.6 (30.9)	82.9 (28.3)	74.1 (23.4)	54.1 (12.3)	40.3 (4.6)	90.2 (32.3)
Mean daily maximum °F (°C)	17.8 (−7.9)	23.5 (−4.7)	36.8 (2.7)	50.2 (10.1)	64.6 (18.1)	73.3 (22.9)	78.3 (25.7)	76.4 (24.7)	68.0 (20.0)	52.2 (11.2)	36.1 (2.3)	22.6 (−5.2)	50.0 (10.0)
Daily mean °F (°C)	7.5 (−13.6)	12.1 (−11.1)	25.6 (−3.6)	39.4 (4.1)	53.0 (11.7)	62.4 (16.9)	67.4 (19.7)	65.6 (18.7)	57.2 (14.0)	42.9 (6.1)	28.1 (−2.2)	14.0 (−10.0)	39.6 (4.2)
Mean daily minimum °F (°C)	−2.9 (−19.4)	0.6 (−17.4)	14.4 (−9.8)	28.5 (−1.9)	41.4 (5.2)	51.6 (10.9)	56.5 (13.6)	54.8 (12.7)	46.4 (8.0)	33.6 (0.9)	20.1 (−6.6)	5.3 (−14.8)	29.2 (−1.5)
Mean minimum °F (°C)	−24.9 (−31.6)	−20.3 (−29.1)	−9.3 (−22.9)	15.3 (−9.3)	27.5 (−2.5)	38.0 (3.3)	46.5 (8.1)	44.1 (6.7)	32.3 (0.2)	22.3 (−5.4)	3.7 (−15.7)	−15.8 (−26.6)	−26.6 (−32.6)
Record low °F (°C)	−57 (−49)	−59 (−51)	−50 (−46)	−17 (−27)	14 (−10)	20 (−7)	33 (1)	24 (−4)	12 (−11)	−1 (−18)	−45 (−43)	−47 (−44)	−59 (−51)
Average precipitation inches (mm)	0.77 (20)	0.73 (19)	1.10 (28)	1.80 (46)	3.07 (78)	4.63 (118)	4.23 (107)	3.39 (86)	3.12 (79)	2.55 (65)	1.34 (34)	1.01 (26)	27.74 (706)
Average snowfall inches (cm)	9.6 (24)	6.6 (17)	5.7 (14)	3.7 (9.4)	0.0 (0.0)	0.0 (0.0)	0.0 (0.0)	0.0 (0.0)	0.0 (0.0)	1.4 (3.6)	8.4 (21)	8.4 (21)	43.8 (110)
Average precipitation days (≥ 0.01 in)	8.2	7.0	6.9	8.4	12.2	13.1	11.6	9.9	11.0	10.5	8.8	8.3	115.9
Average snowy days (≥ 0.1 in)	6.5	5.1	3.9	1.5	0.0	0.0	0.0	0.0	0.0	0.8	4.2	7.2	29.2
Source 1: NOAA
Source 2: National Weather Service

== Demographics ==
Historical population
Census	Pop.	Note	%±
1910	521		—
1920	420		−19.4%
1930	299		−28.8%
1940	389		30.1%
1950	484		24.4%
1960	605		25.0%
1970	536		−11.4%
2000	2,481		—
2010	2,698		8.7%
2020	2,689		−0.3%
U.S. Decennial Census

=== 2020 census ===
As of the 2020 census, Cohasset had a population of 2,689. The median age was 47.4 years. 22.6% of residents were under the age of 18 and 25.1% of residents were 65 years of age or older. For every 100 females there were 103.4 males, and for every 100 females age 18 and over there were 100.2 males age 18 and over.

16.1% of residents lived in urban areas, while 83.9% lived in rural areas.

There were 1,090 households in Cohasset, of which 27.9% had children under the age of 18 living in them. Of all households, 62.8% were married-couple households, 15.0% were households with a male householder and no spouse or partner present, and 15.8% were households with a female householder and no spouse or partner present. About 21.6% of all households were made up of individuals and 10.0% had someone living alone who was 65 years of age or older.

There were 1,264 housing units, of which 13.8% were vacant. The homeowner vacancy rate was 0.8% and the rental vacancy rate was 11.2%.

Racial composition as of the 2020 census
Race	Number	Percent
White	2,486	92.5%
Black or African American	3	0.1%
American Indian and Alaska Native	36	1.3%
Asian	4	0.1%
Native Hawaiian and Other Pacific Islander	0	0.0%
Some other race	17	0.6%
Two or more races	143	5.3%
Hispanic or Latino (of any race)	30	1.1%

=== 2010 census ===
As of the census of 2010, there were 2,698 people, 1,067 households, and 795 families living in the city. The population density was 100.6 inhabitants per square mile (38.8/km^{2}). There were 1,324 housing units at an average density of 49.4 per square mile (19.1/km^{2}). The racial makeup of the city was 94.9% White, 0.1% African American, 2.0% Native American, 0.4% Asian, 0.1% from other races, and 2.5% from two or more races. Hispanic or Latino of any race were 0.6% of the population.

There were 1,067 households, of which 29.2% had children under the age of 18 living with them, 62.5% were married couples living together, 8.2% had a female householder with no husband present, 3.7% had a male householder with no wife present, and 25.5% were non-families. 20.8% of all households were made up of individuals, and 7.8% had someone living alone who was 65 years of age or older. The average household size was 2.52 and the average family size was 2.89.

The median age in the city was 46 years. 23.2% of residents were under the age of 18; 5.8% were between the ages of 18 and 24; 19.6% were from 25 to 44; 35.2% were from 45 to 64; and 16.3% were 65 years of age or older. The gender makeup of the city was 50.3% male and 49.7% female.

=== 2000 census ===
As of the census of 2000, there were 2,481 people, 960 households, and 740 families living in the city. The population density was 93.6 inhabitants per square mile (36.1/km^{2}). There were 1,191 housing units at an average density of 44.9 per square mile (17.3/km^{2}). The racial makeup of the city was 96.65% White, 0.20% African American, 0.93% Native American, 0.16% Asian, 0.16% from other races, and 1.89% from two or more races. Hispanic or Latino of any race were 0.32% of the population.

There were 960 households, out of which 33.6% had children under the age of 18 living with them, 66.6% were married couples living together, 7.5% had a female householder with no husband present, and 22.9% were non-families. 19.1% of all households were made up of individuals, and 7.5% had someone living alone who was 65 years of age or older. The average household size was 2.58 and the average family size was 2.93.

In the city, the population was spread out, with 25.9% under the age of 18, 6.5% from 18 to 24, 24.1% from 25 to 44, 31.1% from 45 to 64, and 12.3% who were 65 years of age or older. The median age was 41 years. For every 100 females, there were 101.2 males. For every 100 females age 18 and over, there were 101.2 males.

The median income for a household in the city was $44,054, and the median income for a family was $48,849. Males had a median income of $48,869 versus $25,250 for females. The per capita income for the city was $21,071. About 4.9% of families and 5.6% of the population were below the poverty line, including 4.5% of those under age 18 and 8.1% of those age 65 or over.

== Gallery ==
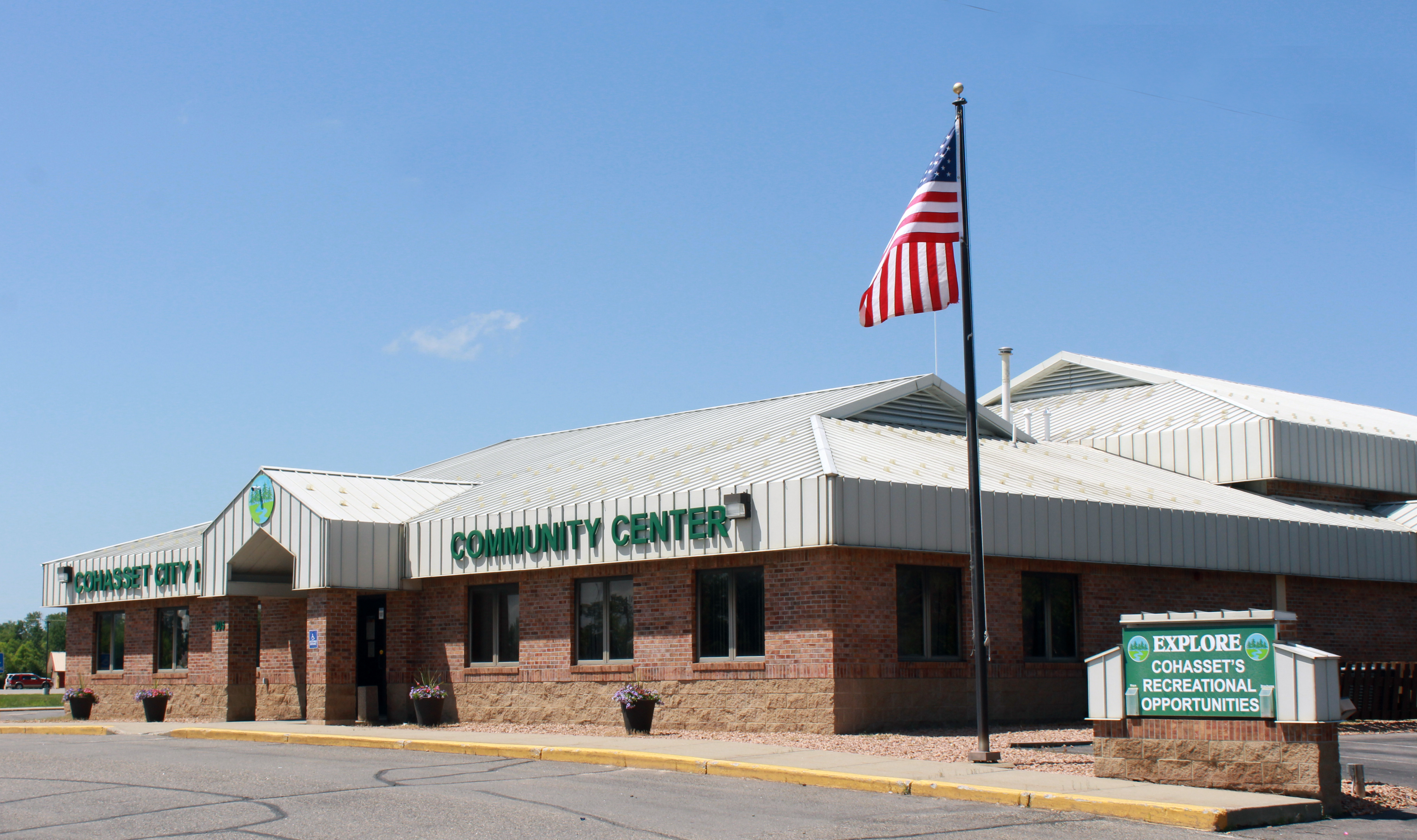
City Hall and Community Center

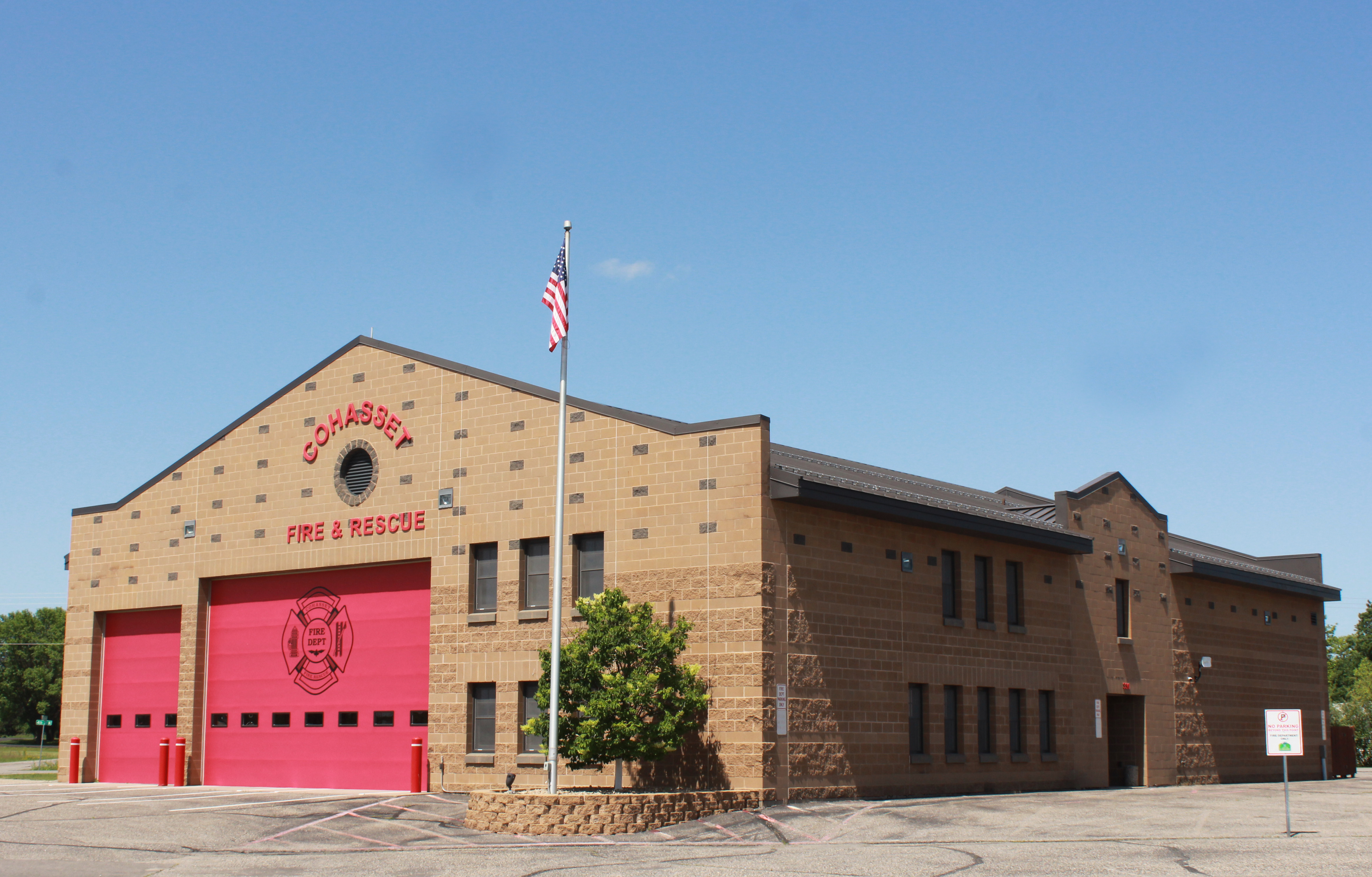
Fire station

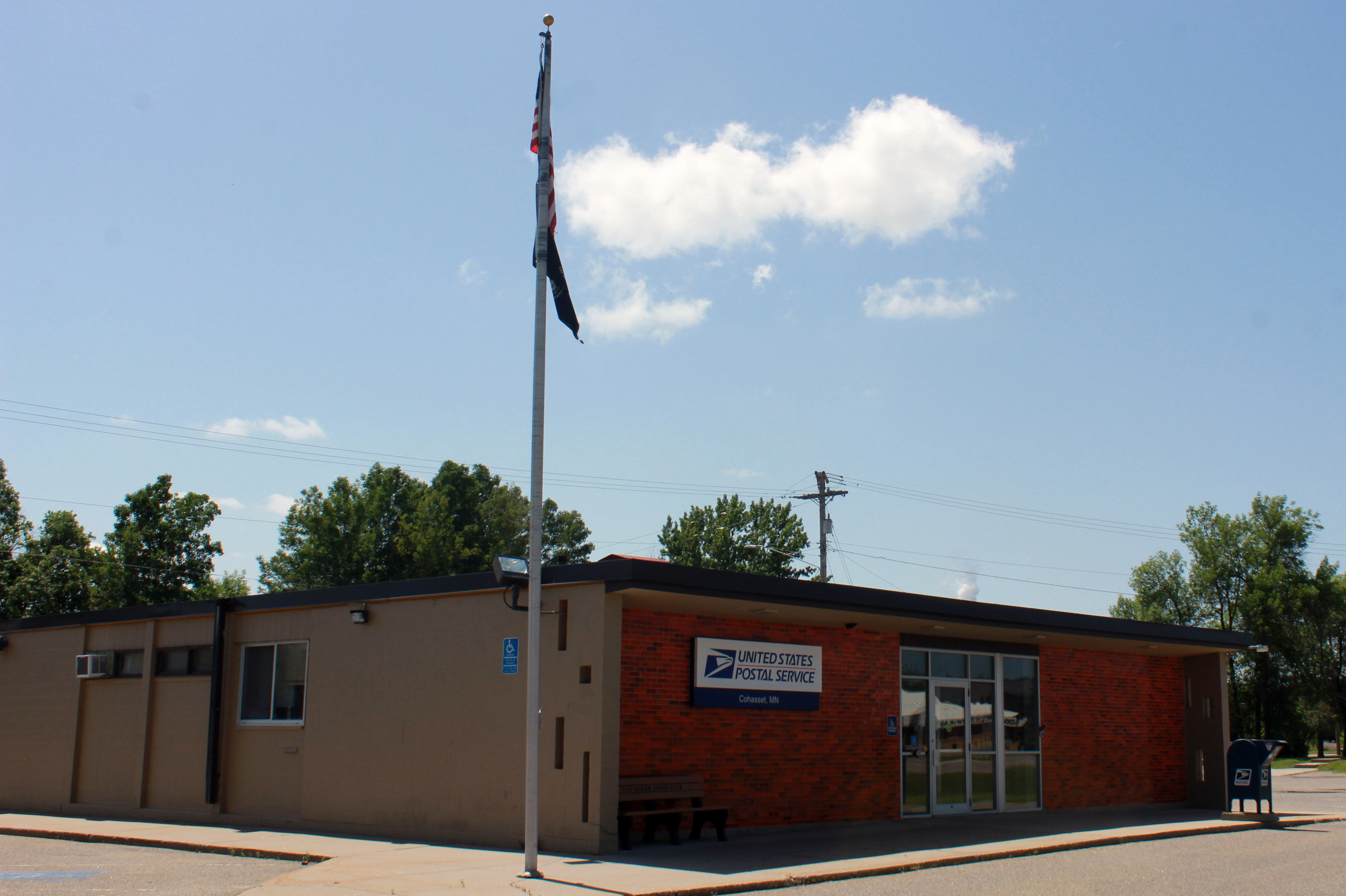
U.S. Post Office
