= Vadim Gusseinov =

Kazakhstani ice hockey player

- Born: April 27, 1968; Ust-Kamenogorsk, Kazakh SSR, Soviet Union
- Position: Forward
- Played for: Torpedo Ust-Kamenogorsk; SKA Khabarovsk; Stroitel Temirtau; Avtomobilist Karagandy
- National team: Kazakhstan
- Playing career: 1985–1990

Vadim Shamilievich Gusseinov (Russian: Вадим Шамильевич Гусейнов; born April 27, 1968) is a Kazakhstani former professionalice hockey forward who played for Torpedo Ust-Kamenogorsk, SKA Khabarovsk, Stroitel Temirtau and Avtomobilist Karagandy. Guseinov is the general manager of KHL team Barys Astana. He was previously the general manager of Kazzinc-Torpedo from 1991 to 2008.
