= Yesil Petropavl =

Kazakh ice hockey team

Yesil Petropavl was an ice hockey team in Petropavl, Kazakhstan. They founded in 2000 and participated in the Kazakhstan Hockey Championship, the top level of ice hockey in Kazakhstan. After three seasons of play, they were operated in 2003.
