= Kazakhmys Satpaev =

Kazakhmys Satbayev Qazaqmys Sátbaev
- City: Satbayev, Kazakhstan
- League: Kazakhstan Hockey Championship
- Founded: 2002
- Operated: 2011
- Home arena: Arena–2005
- Colours

Championships
- Playoff championships: 2005–06

Kazakhmys Hockey Club (Kazakh: Қазақмыс хоккей клубы, Qazaqmys hokkeı klýby), commonly referred as Kazakhmys Satbayev, is a professional ice hockey team based in Satbayev, Kazakhstan. They were founded in 2002, and play in the Kazakhstan Hockey Championship, the top level of ice hockey in Kazakhstan.

== Achievements ==
Kazakhstan Hockey Championship:

- Winners (1): 2005–06
- Runners-up (3): 2002–03, 2004–05, 2006–07
- 3rd place (2): 2003–04, 2008–09

Kazakhstan Hockey Cup:

- Winners (1): 2005, 2006, 2008

Vysshaya Liga:

- 3rd place (1): 2007–08

== Head coaches ==
- Petr Pavluchenko 2002–03
- Anatoli Kartayev 2003–07
- Sergei Ichenski 2007–08
- Sergei Mogilnikov 2008–09
- Sergei Mahinko 2009–10
- Dmitri Glavyuk 2010–11
