= Bulat Temirtau =

- City: Temirtau, Kazakhstan
- League: Kazakhstan Hockey Championship
- Founded: 1960
- Operated: 2005
- Home arena: Temirtau Muz Aidyny

Franchise history
- 1960–1990: Stroitel Temirtau
- 1990–1999: Bulat Temirtau
- 1999–2005: CSKA Temirtau

Championships
- Playoff championships: 1998–99

Bulat Hockey Club (Kazakh: «Болат» хоккей клубы), commonly referred as Bulat Temirtau, was a Soviet and Kazakh ice hockey team based in Temirtau, Kazakhstan. They were active from 1960 to 2005.

== Achievements ==
Kazakhstan Hockey Championship:

- Winners (1): 1998–99
- Runners-up (2): 1994–95, 1997–98
- 3rd place (3): 1992–93, 1999–2000, 2000–01

== See also ==
- Arystan Temirtau
