= Pro Hokei Ligasy =

Annual ice hockey award and national title

- Current season, competition or edition: 2024–25 Pro Hokei Ligasy
- Sport: Ice hockey
- Founded: 1992; 34 years ago
- No. of teams: 10
- Country: Kazakhstan
- Most recent champion: Nomad Astana (3)
- Most titles: Torpedo Ust-Kamenogorsk (13 titles)
- Website: Official website

The Pro Hokei Ligasy, commonly referred to as Kazakhstan Hockey Championship, is the highest level of ice hockey in Kazakhstan. Founded in 1992, eleven teams from Kazakhstan compete to win the Kazakhstan Hockey Cup.

== Teams ==
=== Current teams ===
Team	City	Founded	Arena	Capacity
Arlan Kokshetau	Kokshetau	2009	Burabay Arena	1,500
Beibarys Atyrau	Atyrau	2009	Khiuaz Dospanova Ice Palace	1,000
Gornyak Rudny	Rudny	1958	Rydny Ice Palace	1,500
Torpedo Ust-Kamenogorsk	Ust-Kamenogorsk	1955	Boris Alexandrov Sports Palace	4,310
HC Aktobe	Aktobe	2018	Aktobe Sports Palace	2,348
HC Almaty	Almaty	2010	Palace Sports and Culture Baluan Sholak	5,000
Kulager Petropavl	Petropavl	2015	Alexander Vinokourov Sports Palace	1,000
Nomad Astana	Astana	2007	Kazakhstan Sports Palace	4,070
Saryarka Karagandy	Karagandy	2006	Karagandy-Arena	5,500
Yertis Pavlodar	Pavlodar	2009	Astana Ice Palace	2,800

=== Former teams ===
- Avtomobilist Karagandy
- Altay-Torpedo Ust-Kamenogorsk
- Arystan Temirtau
- Barys Astana
- Bulat Temirtau
- Bergut Tashkent
- Humo Tashkent
- HC Astana
- HC Temirtau
- Snezhnye Barsy
- Kazakhmys Satpaev
- Magnitka Temirtau
- Yenbek Almaty
- Yesil Petropavlovsk

== Champions ==
Season	Gold	Silver	Bronze
1992–93	Torpedo Ust-Kamenogorsk	Avtomobilist Karagandy	Bulat Temirtau
1993–94	Torpedo Ust-Kamenogorsk	Stroitel Karagandy	Bulat Temirtau
1994–95	Torpedo Ust-Kamenogorsk	Bulat Temirtau	Stroitel Karagandy
1995–96	Torpedo Ust-Kamenogorsk	Stroitel Karagandy	Torpedo Ust-Kamenogorsk-2
1996–97	Torpedo Ust-Kamenogorsk	Torpedo Ust-Kamenogorsk-2	Torpedo Ust-Kamenogorsk U18
1997–98	Torpedo Ust-Kamenogorsk	Bulat Temirtau	Torpedo Ust-Kamenogorsk-2
1998–99	Bulat Temirtau	Avtomobilist Karagandy	Amid Rudny
1999–00	Kazzinc-Torpedo	Barys Astana	CSKA Temirtau
2000–01	Kazzinc-Torpedo	Barys Astana	CSKA Temirtau
2001–02	Kazzinc-Torpedo	Barys Astana	Kuat Rudny
2002–03	Kazzinc-Torpedo	Kazakhmys Karagandy	Yenbek Almaty
2003–04	Kazzinc-Torpedo	Gornyak Rudny	Kazakhmys Karagandy
2004–05	Kazzinc-Torpedo	Kazakhmys Karagandy	Gornyak Rudny
2005–06	Kazakhmys Karagandy	Kazzinc-Torpedo	Gornyak Rudny
2006–07	Kazzinc-Torpedo	Kazakhmys Satpaev	Gornyak Rudny
2007–08	Barys Astana	Gornyak Rudny	Kazzinc-Torpedo
2008–09	Barys Astana	Kazzinc-Torpedo	Kazakhmys Satpaev
2009–10	Saryarka Karagandy	Beibarys Atyrau	Yertis Pavlodar
2010–11	Beibarys Atyrau	Nomad Astana	Saryarka Karagandy
2011–12	Beibarys Atyrau	Yertis Pavlodar	Saryarka Karagandy
2012–13	Yertis Pavlodar	Beibarys Atyrau	Arlan Kokshetau
2013–14	Yertis Pavlodar	Arlan Kokshetau	Arystan Temirtau
2014–15	Yertis Pavlodar	Arlan Kokshetau	Gornyak Rudny
2015–16	Beibarys Atyrau	Arlan Kokshetau	Kulager Petropavl
2016–17	Nomad Astana	Temirtau	Arlan Kokshetau
2017–18	Arlan Kokshetau	Nomad Astana	1/2 Beibarys; 1/2 Temirtau
2018–19	Beibarys Atyrau	Nomad Astana	1/2 Arlan Kokshetau; 1/2 Kulager
2019–20	no winner		
2020–21	Saryarka Karagandy	Arlan Kokshetau	Torpedo Ust-Kamenogorsk; Nomad Astana
2021–22	Saryarka Karagandy	Arlan Kokshetau	Beibarys Atyrau; Nomad Astana
2022–23	Nomad Astana	Humo Tashkent	Beibarys Atyrau; Saryarka Karagandy
2023–24	Arlan Kokshetau	Nomad Astana	Saryarka Karagandy
2024–25	Arlan Kokshetau	Torpedo Ust-Kamenogorsk	Saryarka Karagandy; Humo Tashkent
2025–26	Nomad Astana	Saryarka Karagandy	Torpedo Ust-Kamenogorsk

== All-time standings ==
Color	Result
Gold	Champion
Silver	Runner-up
Green	3rd
Light Blue	4th
Dark Blue	5th–8th
Violet	Did not participate (DNP)
White	Not qualified for play-offs (9th–10th)

Team	1993	1994	1995	1996	1997	1998	1999	2000	2001	2002	2003	2004	2005	2006	2007	2008	2009	2010	2011	2012	2013	2014	2015	2016	2017	2018
Torpedo Ust-Kamenogorsk	1	1	1	1	1	1	DNP	1	1	1	1	1	1	2	1	3	2	DNP	DNP	DNP	DNP	DNP	DNP	DNP	DNP	DNP
Bulat Temirtau	3	3	2	4	4	2	1	3	3	5	6	6	8	DNP	DNP	DNP	DNP	DNP	DNP	DNP	DNP	DNP	DNP	DNP	DNP	DNP
Avtomobilist Karagandy	2	2	3	2	DNP	DNP	2	6	DNP	DNP	DNP	DNP	DNP	DNP	DNP	DNP	DNP	DNP	DNP	DNP	DNP	DNP	DNP	DNP	DNP	DNP
Yenbek Almaty	DNP	DNP	DNP	DNP	DNP	DNP	DNP	4	4	4	3	4	5	6	7	8	DNP	DNP	DNP	DNP	DNP	DNP	DNP	DNP	DNP	DNP
Gornyak Rudny	DNP	DNP	DNP	DNP	DNP	DNP	3	7	7	3	4	2	3	3	3	2	5	4	7	7	5	7	3	7	9	8
Barys Astana	DNP	DNP	DNP	DNP	DNP	DNP	DNP	2	2	2	5	5	4	4	5	1	1	DNP	DNP	DNP	DNP	DNP	DNP	DNP	DNP	DNP
Magnitka Temirtau	DNP	DNP	DNP	DNP	DNP	DNP	DNP	7	DNP	DNP	DNP	DNP	DNP	DNP	DNP	DNP	DNP	DNP	DNP	DNP	DNP	DNP	DNP	DNP	DNP	DNP
Yesil Petropavl	DNP	DNP	DNP	DNP	DNP	DNP	DNP	DNP	5	6	7	DNP	DNP	DNP	DNP	DNP	DNP	DNP	DNP	DNP	DNP	DNP	DNP	DNP	DNP	DNP
Ustinka Ust-Kamenogorsk	DNP	DNP	DNP	DNP	DNP	DNP	DNP	DNP	DNP	DNP	DNP	7	DNP	DNP	DNP	DNP	DNP	DNP	DNP	DNP	DNP	DNP	DNP	DNP	DNP	DNP
Yertis Pavlodar	DNP	DNP	DNP	DNP	DNP	DNP	DNP	DNP	DNP	8	DNP	DNP	6	5	6	5	6	3	4	2	1	1	1	4	4	6
Kazakhmys Satpaev	DNP	DNP	DNP	DNP	DNP	DNP	DNP	DNP	DNP	DNP	2	3	2	1	2	4	3	6	8	DNP	DNP	DNP	DNP	DNP	DNP	DNP
Saryarka Karagandy	DNP	DNP	DNP	DNP	DNP	DNP	DNP	DNP	DNP	DNP	DNP	DNP	DNP	DNP	4	6	4	1	3	3	DNP	DNP	DNP	DNP	DNP	DNP
ShKO Oskemen	DNP	DNP	DNP	DNP	DNP	DNP	DNP	DNP	DNP	DNP	DNP	DNP	DNP	DNP	DNP	DNP	DNP	7	10	10	9	10	10	9	8	9
Beibarys Atyrau	DNP	DNP	DNP	DNP	DNP	DNP	DNP	DNP	DNP	DNP	DNP	DNP	DNP	DNP	DNP	DNP	DNP	2	1	1	2	3	4	1	7	4
Nomad Astana	DNP	DNP	DNP	DNP	DNP	DNP	DNP	DNP	DNP	DNP	DNP	DNP	DNP	DNP	DNP	DNP	DNP	8	2	9	7	5	6	5	1	2
Arlan Kokshetau	DNP	DNP	DNP	DNP	DNP	DNP	DNP	DNP	DNP	DNP	DNP	DNP	DNP	DNP	DNP	DNP	DNP	5	6	6	3	2	2	2	3	1
Arystan Temirtau	DNP	DNP	DNP	DNP	DNP	DNP	DNP	DNP	DNP	DNP	DNP	DNP	DNP	DNP	DNP	DNP	DNP	DNP	5	4	4	4	7	DNP	DNP	DNP
HC Almaty	DNP	DNP	DNP	DNP	DNP	DNP	DNP	DNP	DNP	DNP	DNP	DNP	DNP	DNP	DNP	DNP	DNP	DNP	9	8	6	9	5	8	6	7
HC Astana	DNP	DNP	DNP	DNP	DNP	DNP	DNP	DNP	DNP	DNP	DNP	DNP	DNP	DNP	DNP	DNP	DNP	DNP	DNP	5	8	8	8	10	10	10
HC Temirtau	DNP	DNP	DNP	DNP	DNP	DNP	DNP	DNP	DNP	DNP	DNP	DNP	DNP	DNP	DNP	DNP	DNP	DNP	DNP	DNP	10	6	9	6	2	3
Kulager Petropavl	DNP	DNP	DNP	DNP	DNP	DNP	DNP	DNP	DNP	DNP	DNP	DNP	DNP	DNP	DNP	DNP	DNP	DNP	DNP	DNP	DNP	DNP	DNP	3	5	5

== See also ==
- Kazakhstan Hockey Cup
