= Yenbek Almaty =

- City: Almaty, Kazakhstan
- League: Kazakhstan Championship; 1999–2008
- Founded: 1965
- Operated: 2009
- Home arena: Baluan Sholak Sports Palace
- Website: www.nurenbekalmaty.kz

Franchise history
- 1967-1972: Avtomobilist Alma-Ata
- 1972-1994: Yenbek Alma-Ata
- 1994-2009: Yenbek Almaty

Yenbek Almaty (Russian: Хоккейный клуб Енбек Алматы, Kazakh: Еңбек Алматы хоккей клубы, Eńbek Almaty hokkeı klýby) was a Soviet and Kazakh ice hockey team in Almaty, Kazakhstan. They were active from 1965 to 1985 and from 1999 to 2009.

== History ==
The club was founded in 1965 as Avtomobilist Alma-Ata (Автомобилист Алма-ата) and played at first in the Soviet Hockey League Class B, the third level of Soviet ice hockey. Two years later, they promoted to Class A2. In 1972, club renamed to Yenbek Alma-Ata (Yenbek means Labour in Kazakh language). In 1970, Yenbek Alma-Ata achieved a semifinal of Soviet Hockey Cup, where lost to Khimik Voskresensk. Yenbek played six seasons in Class A2 before they collapse in 1975. In 1981, Yenbek was recreated. Yuri Baulin has hired as a new head coach. The team consisted of former Torpedo Ust-Kamenogorsk players. The season of 1984-85 was the last season in Soviet Hockey League system. In independent Kazakhstan history, Yenbek played in Kazakhstan Hockey Championship from 1999 to 2008. They best result bronze medals in 2002-03 season. In 2009, team operated because of financial problems.

== Achievements ==
Kazakhstan Hockey Championship:

- (bronze) 3rd place (1): 2002–03

== Notable Coaches ==
- Yuri Baulin

== See also ==
- HC Almaty
