= Gornyak Rudny =

- City: Rudny, Kazakhstan
- League: Pro Hokei Ligasy; 1998-present
- Founded: 1958
- Home arena: Rudny Ice Palace
- Colors: Black, red, white
- Website: gornyak-hc.kz

Franchise history
- 1958-1971: Gornyak Rudny
- 1971-1979: Vympel Rudny
- 1979-1998: Gornyak Rudny
- 1998-2000: Amid Rudny
- 2000-2002: Kuat Rudny
- 2002–present: Gornyak Rudny

Hockey Club Gornyak (Kazakh: Горняк хоккей клубы, Russian: Хоккейный клуб Горняк), commonly referred as Gornyak Rudny, is a professional ice hockey team that plays in the Pro Hokei Ligasy, the top level of ice hockey in Kazakhstan. They were founded in 1958, when Kazakhstan was part of the Soviet Union. Their team colors are black, white and red. They play at the Rudny Ice Palace.

== Head coaches ==
- Sergei Mogilnikov, 2003–07
