= List of Kazzinc-Torpedo seasons =

This is a list of seasons completed by the Kazzinc-Torpedo. This list documents the records and playoff results for all seasons Kazzinc-Torpedo have completed since 1964.

== Soviet Hockey Championship ==
Promoted to Class A	Relegated to Class A2	Promoted to Class A2	Relegated to Class B

Note: GP = Games played, W = Wins, T = Ties, L = Losses, Pts = Points, GF = Goals for, GA = Goals against

Season	Division	GP	W	T	L	Pts	GF	GA	Finish	Top scorer
1964–65	Class A2	40	13	7	20	135	162	33	7th	Eduard Petrovski (22 goals)
1965–66	Class A2	48	24	6	18	177	133	54	5th	Valentin Gureyev (23 goals)
1966–67	Class A2	44	23	4	17	144	128	50	2nd	Oleg Domrachev (22 goals)
1967–68	Class A2	44	18	9	17	135	115	45	6th	Victor Velichkin (18 goals)
1968–69	Class A2	68	22	8	38	227	299	52	19th	Victor Velichkin (35 goals)
1969–70	Class A2	44	16	10	18	134	140	42	8th	Viktor Semykin (22 goals)
1970–71	Class A2	48	17	7	24	162	195	41	10th	Vladimir Vlasov (35 goals)
1971–72	Class A2	48	17	5	26	165	235	39	9th	Vladimir Vlasov (22 goals)
1972–73	Class A2	48	17	7	23	177	205	42	8th	Alexander Kurilov (35 goals)
1973–74	Class A2	48	16	2	30	161	209	34	11th	Ravil Gataulin (21 goals)
1974–75	Class A2	52	16	7	29	155	252	39	12th	Ravil Gataulin (20 goals)
1975–76	Class A2	52	21	6	25	176	189	48	9th	Ravil Gataulin (29 goals)
1976–77	Class A2	52	15	8	29	191	225	39	13th	Ravil Gataulin (23 goals)
1977–78	Class B	56	20	7	29	187	214	47	11th	Not available
1978–79	Class B	44	16	8	20	156	173	32	8th	Not available
1979–80	Class B	44	30	5	9	213	140	65	2nd	Not available
1980–81	Class A2	72	35	4	33	324	302	74	6th	Not available
1981–82	Class A2	70	38	8	24	364	248	84	6th	Not available
1982–83	Class A2	70	39	9	22	335	301	87	5th	Boris Alexandrov (56 goals)
1983–84	Class A2	60	29	3	28	282	254	61	7th	Boris Alexandrov (50 goals)
1984–85	Class A2	52	30	5	17	229	217	65	5th	Igor Kuznetsov (76 points: 43 G, 33 A)
1985–86	Class A2	64	33	1	30	309	260	67	8th	Igor Kuznetsov (98 points: 53 G, 45 A)
1986–87	Class A2	64	34	11	19	357	261	79	2nd	Boris Alexandrov (131 points: 65 G, 66 A)
1987–88	Class A	62	24	7	31	263	256	55	14th	Boris Alexandrov (91 points: 50 G, 41 A)
1988–89	Class A2	72	45	9	18	380	255	99	1st	Igor Kuznetsov (90 points: 44 G, 46 A)
1989–90	Class A	72	29	7	30	245	240	65	14th	Igor Belyaevski (14 points: 9 G, 5 A)
1990–91	Class A	46	14	10	22	130	182	38	9th	Igor Dorokhin (26 points: 16 G, 10 A)
1991–92	Class A	42	17	4	21	138	159	39	8th	Andrei Raisky (28 points: 15 G, 13 A)

- From 1964 to 1966 Torpedo played at division «Vostok» of Class A2.
- From 1977 to 1980 Torpedo played at the Eastern zone of Class B.
- 1966–67, 1979–80, 1979–80, 1985–86, 1987–88 seasons includes statistics of tournament for promotion.
- 1988–89, 1989–90, 1990–91 seasons includes statistics of tournament for relegation.
- 1991–92 season includes statistics of final tournament.

== International Hockey League ==
Note: GP = Games played, W = Wins, L = Losses, T = Ties, Pts = Points, GF = Goals for, GA = Goals against

Season	GP	W	T	L	Pts	GF	GA	Finish	Top scorer	Playoffs
1992–93	42	23	2	17	48	177	146	5th Eastern	Konstantin Shafranov (38 points: 19 G, 19 A; 42 GP)	Lost in preliminary round, 2–1 (SKA Saint Petersburg)
1993–94	46	25	1	20	51	174	153	9th, League	Konstantin Shafranov (39 points: 18 G, 21 A; 27 GP)	No playoffs held
1994–95	52	24	4	24	52	173	171	7th, Eastern	Boris Alexandrov (33 points: 14 G, 19 A; 50 GP)	Lost in preliminary round, 2–0 (Krylya Sovetov Moscow)
1995–96	52	20	5	27	31	130	177	9th, Eastern	Andrei Samokhvalov (31 points: 23 G, 8 A; 49 GP)	No playoffs held

- 1995–96 season includes statistics of tournament for the 15th–28th places.

== Kazakhstan Hockey Championship ==
Champion	Runner-up	3rd place

Note: GP = Games played, W = Wins, L = Losses, T = Ties, OTW = Overtime/shootout wins, OTL = Overtime/shootout losses, Pts = Points, GF = Goals for, GA = Goals against

Season	GP	W	T	OTW	OTL	L	Pts	GF	GA	Finish	Top scorer
1992–93	9	8	1	—	—	0	17	63	33	1st	Not available
1993–94	12	10	1	—	—	1	21	88	29	1st	Oleg Kryazhev (21 points: 13 G, 8 A)
1994–95	12	10	1	—	—	1	21	94	21	1st	Konstantin Spodarenko (14 points: 11 G, 3 A)
1995–96	6	6	0	—	—	0	12	54	16	1st	Not available
1996–97	8	7	0	—	—	1	14	84	27	1st	Not available
1997–98	3	3	0	—	—	0	6	29	7	1st	Not available
1999–00	3	3	0	—	—	0	6	23	7	1st	Maxim Komissarov (Not available)
2000–01	24	22	0	—	—	2	44	240	50	1st	Not available
2001–02	24	23	0	—	—	1	46	244	46	1st	Not available
2002–03	24	23	1	—	—	0	46	224	26	1st	Not available
2003–04	24	22	1	—	—	1	45	226	32	1st	Vadim Rifel (38 points: 14 G, 24 A, 22 GP)
2004–05	24	21	1	0	0	2	64	100	27	1st	Andrei Ogorodnikov (21 points: 12 G, 9 A, 23 GP)
2005–06	20	13	2	0	0	5	41	80	47	2nd	Sergey Alexandrov (15 points: 9 G, 6 A, 19 GP)
2006–07	24	20	0	3	0	1	66	145	49	1st	Roman Starchenko (24 points: 14 G, 10 A, 20 GP)
2007–08	5	2	—	2	0	1	10	16	14	3rd	Not available
2008–09	5	4	—	0	1	0	13	23	8	2nd	Alexander Shin (7 points: 4 G, 3 A, 5 GP)

- Torpedo missed the 1998–99 season because of their participation at the Russian Major League.
- From 2007 to 2009 Torpedo competed only at final round, its farm team Torpedo-2 played at first round.

== Russian Supreme League ==
Promoted to Russian Supreme League	Relegated to Russian First League

Note: GP = Games played, W = Wins, L = Losses, T = Ties, OTW = Overtime/shootout wins, OTL = Overtime/shootout losses, Pts = Points, GF = Goals for, GA = Goals against

Season	GP	W	T	OTW	OTL	L	Pts	GF	GA	Finish	Top scorer	Playoffs
1996–97	48	32	3	—	—	13	67	217	128	2nd, Eastern	Not available	No playoffs held
1997–98	56	30	7	—	—	19	67	208	181	2nd, Eastern	Nik Antropov (39 points: 15 G, 24 A, 42 GP)	No playoffs held
1998–99	46	26	8	—	—	14	60	174	129	3rd, Eastern	Anatoli Filatov (61 points: 27 G, 34 A, 57 GP)	No playoffs held
1999–2000	48	43	—	0	1	4	130	327	99	1st, Siberia-Far East	Andrei Troschinsky (66 points: 20 G, 46 A)	No playoffs held
2000–01	54	45	—	4	0	5	140	359	160	1st, Siberia-Far East	Not available	No playoffs held
2001–02	56	36	—	6	0	14	116	258	175	3rd, Eastern	Fedor Polishchuk (58 points: 29 G, 29 A, 54 GP)	No playoffs held
2002–03	52	32	—	7	1	12	105	174	111	2nd, Eastern	Fedor Polishchuk (49 points: 22 G, 27 A, 47 GP)	No playoffs held
2003–04	52	28	—	7	1	16	95	162	115	4th, Eastern	Fedor Polishchuk (41 points: 22 G, 19 A, 48 GP)	Had no rights to play in playoffs
2004–05	52	33	—	4	0	15	104	157	96	4th, Eastern	Andrei Ogorodnikov (33 points: 15 G, 18 A, 43 GP)	Had no rights to play in playoffs
2005–06	48	18	—	7	2	21	66	134	148	8th, Eastern	Alexander Koreshkov (42 points: 10 G, 32 A, 36 GP)	Had no rights to play in playoffs
2006–07	56	30	—	9	2	15	66	199	141	4th, Eastern	Andrei Troschinsky (54 points: 17 G, 37 A, 56 GP)	Had no rights to play in playoffs
2007–08	56	29	—	4	5	14	100	169	114	3rd, Eastern	Andrei Ogorodnikov (36 points: 10 G, 26 A, 48 GP)	Lost in Quarterfinals, 3–1 (Dizel Penza)
2008–09	54	23	—	8	4	19	89	166	149	5th, Eastern	Sergei Alexandrov (45 points: 19 G, 26 A, 49 GP)	Lost in First Round, 3–1 (Gazovik Tyumen)
2009–10	42	13	—	2	1	26	44	107	135	7th, Eastern	Vadim Rifel (34 points: 11 G, 23 A, 42 GP)	Lost in Second Round, 3–0 (Dizel Penza)

== Supreme Hockey League ==
Bratina Cup Champions	League leader

Note: GP = Games played, W = Wins, L = Losses, OTW = Overtime/shootout wins, OTL = Overtime/shootout losses, Pts = Points, GF = Goals for, GA = Goals against

Season	GP	W	OTW	OTL	L	Pts	GF	GA	Finish	Top scorer	Playoffs
2010–11	54	23	5	7	21	86	151	153	6th, Eastern	Sergei Alexandrov (29 points: 16 G, 13 A, 49 GP)	Lost in Conference Quarterfinals, 3–2 (Molot-Prikamye Perm)
2011–12	53	23	7	2	21	85	154	140	5th, Eastern	Alexander Mayer (35 points: 20 G, 15 A, 48 GP)	Lost in Conference Quarterfinals, 3–2 (Ermak Angarsk)
2012–13	52	22	6	6	18	84	147	123	14th, Overall	Evgeni Rymarev (44 points: 19 G, 25 A, 50 GP)	Lost in preliminary round, 3–0 (Toros Neftekamsk)
2013–14	50	20	8	6	16	82	140	146	11th, Overall	Evgeni Rymarev (36 points: 20 G, 16 A, 45 GP)	Lost in Quarterfinals, 4–2 (Dizel Penza)
2014–15	52	19	5	8	20	75	126	143	15th, Overall	Alexander Shin (34 points: 9 G, 25 A, 47 GP)	Lost in Quarterfinals, 4–0 (HC Izhstal)
2015–16	49	22	9	3	15	87	130	100	9th, Overall	Alexander Shin (37 points: 13 G, 24 A, 47 GP)	Lost in Quarterfinals, 4–2 (Saryarka Karagandy)
2016–17	50	30	4	11	5	109	160	100	1st, Overall	Evgeny Belukhin (32 points: 9 G, 23 A, 48 GP)	Lost in Final, 4–0 (Dynamo Balashikha)
