= Igor Belyaevski =

Kazakhstani ice hockey player

- Born: January 30, 1963 (age 62); Ust-Kamenogorsk, Kazakh SSR, Soviet Union
- Position: Forward
- Played for: Yenbek Alma-Ata; Izhstal Ustinov; Torpedo Ust-Kamenogorsk; Acroni Jesenice; Avangard Omsk; Metallurg Novokuznetsk; Spartak Moscow; SKA Saint Petersburg; Mostovik Kurgan; Gazovik Tyumen
- National team: Kazakhstan
- Playing career: 1980–2003

Igor Konstantinovich Belyaevski (Russian: Игорь Константинович Беляевский) is a retired Kazakhstani professional ice hockey player.

== Career statistics ==
| | | | Regular season | | | | | Playoffs |
| Season | Team | League | GP | G | A | Pts | PIM | GP | G | A | Pts | PIM |
|---|---|---|---|---|---|---|---|---|---|---|---|---|
| 1980–81 | Yenbek Almaty | Soviet3 | — | 20 | — | — | — | — | — | — | — | — |
| 1981–82 | Yenbek Almaty | Soviet3 | 39 | 21 | 9 | 30 | 13 | — | — | — | — | — |
| 1982–83 | Yenbek Almaty | Soviet2 | 68 | 30 | 20 | 50 | — | — | — | — | — | — |
| 1983–84 | Yenbek Almaty | Soviet2 | 60 | 31 | — | — | — | — | — | — | — | — |
| 1984–85 | Ishstal Ustinov | Soviet | 22 | 2 | 1 | 3 | 4 | — | — | — | — | — |
| 1985–86 | Ishstal Ustinov | Soviet | 22 | 4 | 3 | 7 | 8 | — | — | — | — | — |
| 1986–87 | Ishstal Ustinov | Soviet2 | 63 | 22 | 15 | 37 | 16 | — | — | — | — | — |
| 1987–88 | Ishstal Ustinov | Soviet | 26 | 8 | 5 | 13 | 4 | — | — | — | — | — |
| 1988–89 | Torpedo Ust-Kamenogorsk | Soviet2 | 51 | 23 | 15 | 38 | 8 | — | — | — | — | — |
| 1989–90 | Torpedo Ust-Kamenogorsk | Soviet | 27 | 9 | 5 | 14 | 4 | — | — | — | — | — |
| 1990–91 | Torpedo Ust-Kamenogorsk | Soviet | 46 | 12 | 9 | 21 | 14 | — | — | — | — | — |
| 1991–92 | Torpedo Ust-Kamenogorsk | Soviet | 36 | 9 | 3 | 12 | 18 | 6 | 2 | 0 | 2 | 0 |
| 1992–93 | Torpedo Ust-Kamenogorsk | Russia | 42 | 11 | 15 | 26 | 12 | 1 | 1 | 0 | 1 | 0 |
| 1993–94 | Torpedo Ust-Kamenogorsk | Russia | 31 | 11 | 10 | 21 | 22 | — | — | — | — | — |
| 1993–94 | HK Jesenice | Slovenia | — | — | — | — | — | — | 8 | 5 | 13 | — |
| 1995–96 | Avangard Omsk | Russia | 50 | 10 | 6 | 16 | 12 | 3 | 2 | 0 | 2 | 0 |
| 1996–97 | Avangard Omsk | Russia | 43 | 12 | 11 | 23 | 12 | 5 | 1 | 1 | 2 | 4 |
| 1997–98 | Avangard Omsk | Russia | 44 | 3 | 10 | 13 | 12 | 5 | 0 | 0 | 0 | 0 |
| 1998–99 | Metallurg Novokuznetsk | Russia | 40 | 8 | 12 | 20 | 4 | 6 | 3 | 0 | 3 | 2 |
| 1999–00 | Metallurg Novokuznetsk | Russia | 33 | 3 | 2 | 5 | 4 | 13 | 0 | 1 | 1 | 2 |
| 2000–01 | HC Spartak Moscow | Russia2 | 29 | 2 | 11 | 13 | 12 | — | — | — | — | — |
| 2000–01 | SKA Saint Petersburg | Russia | 8 | 1 | 0 | 1 | 2 | — | — | — | — | — |
| 2001–02 | Mostovik Kurgan | Russia2 | 52 | 10 | 15 | 25 | 24 | — | — | — | — | — |
| 2002–03 | Gazovik Tyumen | Russia2 | 12 | 2 | 2 | 4 | 2 | — | — | — | — | — |
| Russia totals | | | 291 | 59 | 66 | 125 | 80 | 33 | 7 | 2 | 9 | 8 |
