= Yerlan Sagymbayev =

Kazakhstani ice hockey player

- Born: April 5, 1970 (age 55) Ust-Kamenogorsk, Kazakh SSR, Soviet Union
- Height: 6 ft 1 in (185 cm)
- Weight: 176 lb (80 kg; 12 st 8 lb)
- Position: Right Wing
- Shot: Left
- Played for: Torpedo Ust-Kamenogorsk; Avtomobilist Karagandy; Avangard Omsk; Metallurg Novokuznetsk; Sibir Novosibirsk
- National team: Kazakhstan
- Playing career: 1987–2001

Yerlan Yerlesuly Sagymbayev (Kazakh: Ерлан Ерлесұлы Сағымбаев, Erlan Erlesūly Sağymbaev; born April 5, 1970) is a Kazakhstani former professional ice hockey player, and head coach.

== Playing career ==
Yerlan Sagymbayev is a graduate of the Ust-Kamenogorsk ice hockey school. He is a two-time champion of the USSR Junior Championships in the squad of the Torpedo Ust-Kamenogorsk. In 1987, he awarded as a best young forward and invited to the USSR national youth team. In 1988, he was a bronze medalist of the Viking Cup in Calgary. After Soviet Union collapse, he played for the Kazakhstan national ice hockey team. He served as captain at the 1998 Winter Olympics in Nagano, where his team achieved a quarter final. He ended his career because of injury in 2001.

== Career statistics ==
=== Regular season and playoffs ===
			Regular season					Playoffs
Season	Team	League	GP	G	A	Pts	PIM	GP	G	A	Pts	PIM
1986–87	Torpedo Ust–Kamenogorsk	URS.2	3	0	0	0	0	—	—	—	—	—
1987–88	Torpedo Ust–Kamenogorsk	URS	5	1	0	1	4	—	—	—	—	—
1988–89	Torpedo Ust–Kamenogorsk	URS.2	7	1	1	2	0	—	—	—	—	—
1988–89	SKA Sverdlovsk	URS.2	16	7	2	9	8	—	—	—	—	—
1989–90	Torpedo Ust–Kamenogorsk	URS	7	0	0	0	2	—	—	—	—	—
1990–91	Avtomobilist Karaganda	URS.2	60	15	11	26	14	—	—	—	—	—
1991–92	Torpedo Ust–Kamenogorsk	CIS	34	10	2	12	14	6	2	0	2	0
1992–93	Torpedo Ust–Kamenogorsk	IHL	41	20	4	24	20	—	—	—	—	—
1993–94	Torpedo Ust–Kamenogorsk	IHL	37	16	5	21	12	—	—	—	—	—
1994–95	Avangard Omsk	IHL	37	17	6	23	4	5	0	0	0	2
1994–95	Avangard–2 Omsk	RUS.2	1	1	2	3	4	—	—	—	—	—
1995–96	Avangard Omsk	IHL	29	7	7	14	6	2	0	1	1	2
1995–96	Avangard–2 Omsk	RUS.2	6	3	0	3	2	—	—	—	—	—
1996–97	Metallurg Novokuznetsk	RSL	10	2	1	3	12	—	—	—	—	—
1996–97	Metallurg–2 Novokuznetsk	RUS.3	10	2	1	3	12	3	3	0	3	4
1997–98	Sibir Novosibirsk	RSL	26	5	2	7	20	—	—	—	—	—
1999–2000	Torpedo Ust–Kamenogorsk	RUS.3	18	14	14	28	6	—	—	—	—	—
1999–2000	ERSC Amberg	GER.3	6	2	1	3	2	—	—	—	—	—
2000–01	Kazzinc–Torpedo	RUS.3	51	29	29	58	16	—	—	—	—	—
IHL totals			144	60	22	82	42	7	0	1	1	2

=== International ===
Year	Team	Event	GP	G	A	Pts	PIM
1993	Kazakhstan	WC C	7	4	5	9	2
1994	Kazakhstan	WC C	6	1	2	3	6
1996	Kazakhstan	WC C	7	6	4	10	10
1997	Kazakhstan	WC B	7	4	0	4	26
1998	Kazakhstan	OG	7	1	0	1	4
1998	Kazakhstan	WC	3	0	0	0	4
2001	Kazakhstan	WC D1	5	2	1	3	25
Senior totals			42	18	12	30	77

== Coaching career ==
- 2004–2005 Kazakhstan U20 National Team - assistant coach
- 2005–2006 Kazakhstan U20 National Team - head coach
- 2006–2008 Kazzinc-Torpedo - head coach
- 2009–2011 Yertis Pavlodar - head coach
- 2011–2012 Kazakhstan U20 National Team - head coach
- 2012–2014 Barys Astana - assistant coach
- 2014–2015 Snezhnye Barsy - assistant coach
- 2015–present Barys Astana - head coach

Awards and achievements
Preceded by Andrei Nazarov	Head coach of the Barys Astana; 2015	Succeeded by Evgeni Koreshkov
