= Airat Kadeikin =

Russian ice hockey player

- Born: July 7, 1970 (age 56) Penza, Russian SFSR, Soviet Union
- Height: 5 ft 11 in (180 cm)
- Weight: 187 lb (85 kg; 13 st 5 lb)
- Position: Right wing
- Played for: Dizelist Penza; SKA Novosibirsk; Itil Kazan; Ak Bars Kazan; HC Neftekhimik Nizhnekamsk; Metallurg Novokuznetsk; Neftyanik Almetievsk; Neftyanik Leninogorsk
- Playing career: 1987–2005

Airat Kadeikin (born July 7, 1970) is a Soviet and Russian former professional ice hockey forward. He is a one-time Russian Champion.

== Career statistics ==
			Regular season					Playoffs
Season	Team	League	GP	G	A	Pts	PIM	GP	G	A	Pts	PIM
1987–88	Dizelist Penza	Soviet2	13	2	0	2	8	—	—	—	—	—
1988–89	Dizelist Penza	Soviet3	68	4	9	13	32	—	—	—	—	—
1989–90	SKA Novosibirsk	Soviet2	66	10	9	19	30	—	—	—	—	—
1990–91	Dizel Penza	Soviet3	65	20	21	41	40	—	—	—	—	—
1991–92	Dizelist Penza	Soviet2	55	8	18	26	28	—	—	—	—	—
1992–93	Itil Kazan	Russia	40	9	4	13	20	—	—	—	—	—
1993–94	Itil Kazan	Russia	45	12	10	22	42	5	0	1	1	4
1994–95	Itil Kazan	Russia	51	13	10	23	38	2	0	0	0	27
1994–95	Itil Kazan-2	Russia2	1	2	0	2	0	—	—	—	—	—
1995–96	Ak Bars Kazan	Russia	52	7	12	19	24	5	0	2	2	8
1996–97	Ak Bars Kazan	Russia	43	8	2	10	45	3	0	0	0	4
1997–98	Ak Bars Kazan	Russia	34	3	3	6	12	3	0	0	0	2
1997–98	Ak Bars Kazan-2	Russia3	4	5	3	8	4	—	—	—	—	—
1998–99	HC Neftekhimik Nizhnekamsk	Russia	39	9	10	19	20	3	0	0	0	0
1999–00	HC Neftekhimik Nizhnekamsk	Russia	38	13	8	21	68	4	0	2	2	6
2000–01	HC Neftekhimik Nizhnekamsk	Russia	42	6	8	14	50	4	2	0	2	2
2000–01	HC Neftekhimik Nizhnekamsk-2	Russia3	1	0	0	0	0	—	—	—	—	—
2001–02	HC Neftekhimik Nizhnekamsk	Russia	47	5	7	12	56	—	—	—	—	—
2002–03	Metallurg Novokuznetsk	Russia	44	5	9	14	52	—	—	—	—	—
2003–04	Neftyanik Almetyevsk	Russia2	48	3	17	20	87	—	—	—	—	—
2004–05	Neftyanik Leninogorsk	Russia2	34	10	15	25	61	—	—	—	—	—
Russia totals			475	90	83	173	427	29	2	5	7	53

== Awards and honors ==
Award	Year
RSL
Winner (Ak Bars Kazan)	1998
