= Vladimir Belyayev (ice hockey) =

Kazakh ice hockey coach

- Born: Vladimir Nikolaevich Belyayev; 20 October 1958 (age 67); Ust-Kamenogorsk, Kazakh SSR, USSR
- Occupation: ice hockey coach

Vladimir Nikolaevich Belyayev (Russian: Владимир Николаевич Беляев, born 20 October 1958) is a Kazakhstani professional ice hockey coach. He is honored coach of the Republic of Kazakhstan. Belyaev was the head coach of HC Astana from 2011 until 2013. His son Maksim Belyayev is an ice hockey player and playing for Yugra Khanty-Mansiysk at the Kontinental Hockey League.

== Coaching career ==
- 1997–1998 Kazakhstan U20 national team - head coach
- 2000–2002 Kazakhstan U18 national team - assistant coach
- 2002–2003 Kazakhstan U18 national team - head coach
- 2003–2004 Kazakhstan U20 national team - head coach
- 2004–2005 Kazakhstan U18 national team - assistant coach
- 2005–2006 Kazzinc-Torpedo - head coach
- 2006–2008 Kazakhstan U18 national team - head coach
- 2007–2008 Kazzinc-Torpedo-2 - head coach
- 2008–2010 Kazzinc-Torpedo - head coach
- 2010–2011 Kazzinc-Torpedo-2 - head coach
- 2011–2013 HC Astana - head coach
