= Oleg Bolyakin =

Kazakhstani ice hockey player

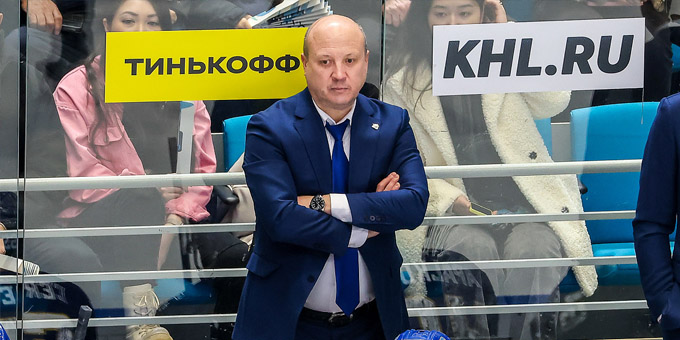
- Born: September 23, 1965 Karagandy, Soviet Union
- Height: 5 ft 9 in (175 cm)
- Weight: 172 lb (78 kg; 12 st 4 lb)
- Position: Defenceman
- Shot: Left
- Played for: Avtomobilist Karagandy; Amur Khabarovsk; Yuzhny Ural Orsk
- National team: Kazakhstan
- Playing career: 1981–2003

Oleg Vladimirovich Bolyakin (Russian: Олег Владимирович Болякин, born September 5, 1965) is a former Kazakhstani professional ice hockey player. He is honored coach of the Republic of Kazakhstan. Bolyakin is a former head coach of Yertis Pavlodar, Saryarka Karagandy, Kazzinc-Torpedo and HC Almaty. His son Evgeni Bolyakin is also hockey player.

== Career ==
Oleg Bolyakin is the graduate of Karagandy ice hockey school. He started his career as a player of Avtomobilist Karagandy in 1981. In 1995, he invited to play in Kazakhstan National Hockey Team and played 3 games with them. In 1996, Avtomobilist Karagandy was disbanded. In 1998, he signed a contract with Amur Khabarovsk, but played only 9 games. From 1999 to 2003, he played for Yuzhny Ural Orsk at the Russian Major League.

== Career statistics ==
			Regular season					Playoffs
Season	Team	League	GP	G	A	Pts	PIM	GP	G	A	Pts	PIM
1987–88	Stroitel Temirtau	Soviet3	—	17	—	—	—	—	—	—	—	—
1988–89	Avtomobilist Karagandy	Soviet2	64	9	2	11	67	—	—	—	—	—
1989–90	Avtomobilist Karagandy	Soviet2	62	1	8	9	36	—	—	—	—	—
1990–91	Avtomobilist Karagandy	Soviet2	57	1	3	4	40	—	—	—	—	—
1991–92	Avtomobilist Karagandy	Soviet2	48	3	6	9	63	—	—	—	—	—
1992–93	Avtomobilist Karagandy	Russia	39	1	5	6	40	—	—	—	—	—
1993–94	Stroitel Karagandy	Russia	40	3	3	6	40	—	—	—	—	—
1994–95	Stroitel Karagandy	Russia	36	8	6	14	32	—	—	—	—	—
1995–96	Stroitel Karagandy	Russia	52	5	4	9	77	—	—	—	—	—
1996–97	HK Voronezh	Russia2	52	6	6	12	96	—	—	—	—	—
1997–98	HK Voronezh	Russia2	26	4	5	9	30	—	—	—	—	—
1997–98	HK Voronezh-2	Russia3	1	0	0	0	4	—	—	—	—	—
1998–99	HK Voronezh	Russia2	13	0	3	3	2	—	—	—	—	—
1998–99	HK Voronezh-2	Russia3	2	0	0	0	2	—	—	—	—	—
1998–99	SKA-Amur Khabarovsk	Russia	9	0	0	0	4	—	—	—	—	—
1999–00	Nosta-Yuzhny Ural Novotroitsk-Orsk	Russia2	37	1	3	4	75	—	—	—	—	—
2000–01	Nosta-Yuzhny Ural Novotroitsk-Orsk	Russia2	42	3	4	7	62	—	—	—	—	—
2001–02	Yuzhny Ural Orsk	Russia2	46	4	10	14	131	—	—	—	—	—
2002–03	Yuzhny Ural Orsk	Russia2	9	0	0	0	6	—	—	—	—	—
2002–03	Kazakhmys Karaganda	Russia3	9	1	0	1	6	—	—	—	—	—
Russia totals			176	17	18	35	193	—	—	—	—	—
Russia2 totals			225	18	31	49	402	—	—	—	—	—

== Coaching career ==
- 2004-2007 Kazakhmys Satpaev-2 - head coach
- 2004-2006 Kazakhstan U20 National Team - assistant coach
- 2006-2007 Kazakhstan U18 National Team - assistant coach
- 2006-2007 Kazakhstan U20 National Team - head coach
- 2007-2008 Yertis Pavlodar - head coach
- 2009-2010 HC Saryarka - head coach
- 2010-2012 Kazzinc-Torpedo - head coach
- 2012 HC Almaty - head coach
