= Andrei Samokhvalov =

Kazakhstani ice hockey player (born 1975)

- Born: May 10, 1975 (age 51) Ust-Kamenogorsk, Kazakh SSR, Soviet Union
- Height: 6 ft 0 in (183 cm)
- Weight: 192 lb (87 kg; 13 st 10 lb)
- Position: Right wing
- Shot: Left
- Played for: Kazzinc-Torpedo; Avangard Omsk; Metallurg Novokuznetsk; Salavat Yulaev Ufa; Spartak Moscow; HC MVD; Torpedo Nizhny Novgorod; Khimik Voskresensk; Khimvolokno Mogilev
- National team: Kazakhstan
- NHL draft: 208th overall, 1995; Detroit Red Wings
- Playing career: 1990–2010

Andrei Viktorovich Samokhvalov (Russian: Андрей Викторович Самохва́лов, born May 10, 1975) is a Kazakhstani former professional ice hockey player. He played for Kazakhstan National Hockey Team at the 2006 Olympic Winter Games. Andrei Samokhvalov is the graduate of Ust-Kamenogorsk ice hockey school. He drafted 208th overall in the round eight of 1995 NHL entry draft by Detroit Red Wings, but never signed a contract with them.

== Career statistics ==
=== Regular season and playoffs ===
			Regular season					Playoffs
Season	Team	League	GP	G	A	Pts	PIM	GP	G	A	Pts	PIM
1990–91	Torpedo Ust–Kamenogorsk	URS	2	1	1	2	0	—	—	—	—	—
1991–92	ShVSM Ust–Kamenogorsk	CIS.3	12	4	2	6	18	—	—	—	—	—
1992–93	Torpedo Ust–Kamenogorsk	IHL	27	6	7	13	8	1	1	1	2	0
1992–93	Torpedo–2 Ust–Kamenogorsk	RUS.2	22	8	4	12	8	—	—	—	—	—
1993–94	Torpedo Ust–Kamenogorsk	IHL	33	5	5	10	16	—	—	—	—	—
1993–94	Torpedo–2 Ust–Kamenogorsk	RUS.3		1				—	—	—	—	—
1994–95	Torpedo Ust–Kamenogorsk	IHL	44	13	9	22	6	2	0	0	0	2
1995–96	Torpedo Ust–Kamenogorsk	IHL	49	23	8	31	20	—	—	—	—	—
1996–97	Avangard Omsk	RSL	42	11	15	26	33	5	2	1	3	4
1996–97	Avangard–2 Omsk	RUS.3	2	1	2	3	0	—	—	—	—	—
1997–98	Avangard Omsk	RSL	43	9	4	13	20	4	1	0	1	4
1998–99	Avangard Omsk	RSL	40	6	6	12	4	6	0	1	1	10
1999–2000	Avangard Omsk	RSL	37	5	5	10	20	7	0	2	2	2
1999–2000	Avangard–2 Omsk	RUS.3	1	1	0	1	0	—	—	—	—	—
2000–01	Avangard Omsk	RSL	39	11	5	16	4	6	0	0	0	0
2001–02	Avangard Omsk	RSL	8	2	0	2	2	—	—	—	—	—
2001–02	Avangard–2 Omsk	RUS.3	4	3	5	8	0	—	—	—	—	—
2001–02	Metallurg Novokuznetsk	RSL	29	7	7	14	16	—	—	—	—	—
2002–03	Salavat Yulaev Ufa	RSL	44	5	6	11	10	2	0	0	0	2
2003–04	Spartak Moscow	RUS.2	60	18	29	47	28	13	7	6	13	2
2004–05	Spartak Moscow	RSL	34	3	2	5	14	—	—	—	—	—
2004–05	Spartak–2 Moscow	RUS.3	2	1	3	4	0	—	—	—	—	—
2004–05	HC MVD	RUS.2	8	1	5	6	2	11	3	4	7	4
2005–06	Torpedo Nizhny Novgorod	RUS.2	3	1	2	3	2	—	—	—	—	—
2005–06	Torpedo–2 Nizhny Novgorod	RUS.3	5	3	5	8	2	—	—	—	—	—
2005–06	Khimik Voskresensk	RUS.2	29	10	12	22	38	6	3	1	4	10
2006–07	Torpedo Nizhny Novgorod	RUS.2	46	17	25	42	40	13	0	6	6	2
2007–08	Khimvolokno Mogilev	BLR	52	13	26	39	48	4	0	2	2	2
2008–09	Khimvolokno Mogilev	BLR	50	15	19	34	74	9	2	5	7	6
2009–10	Khimvolokno Mogilev	BLR	49	10	21	31	22	5	0	2	2	14
IHL totals			153	47	29	76	50	3	1	1	2	2
RUS.2 totals			168	55	77	132	118	43	13	17	30	18
RSL totals			316	59	50	109	123	30	3	4	7	22

=== International ===
Year	Team	Event	GP	G	A	Pts	PIM
1993	Kazakhstan	AJC	4	8	11	19	4
1995	Kazakhstan	WC C	4	1	3	4	0
1996	Kazakhstan	WC C	7	2	2	4	2
1999	Kazakhstan	WC B	7	1	3	4	2
2004	Kazakhstan	WC	5	3	0	3	2
2005	Kazakhstan	OGQ	3	1	0	1	4
2006	Kazakhstan	OG	5	0	0	0	0
2006	Kazakhstan	WC	6	1	0	1	2
2009	Kazakhstan	WC D1	5	1	1	2	0
Senior totals			42	10	9	19	12
