= Sergei Mogilnikov =

- Born: September 28, 1955 (age 69); Ust-Kamenogorsk, Kazakh SSR, Soviet Union
- Height: 5 ft 10 in (178 cm)
- Weight: 165 lb (75 kg; 11 st 11 lb)
- Position: Forward
- Played for: Torpedo Ust-Kamenogorsk; Avtomobilist Karagandy; Metallurg Magnitogorsk; Rubin Tyumen
- National team: Kazakhstan
- Playing career: 1975–1997

Sergei Petrovich Mogilnikov (Russian: Серге́й Петрович Могильников, born September 28, 1958) is a former Soviet and Kazakhstani professional ice hockey player and currently an ice hockey coach. He is the former head coach of Gornyak Rudny, Barys Astana, Kazakhmys Satpaev and Kazzinc-Torpedo.

== Career ==
Sergei Mogilnikov played the most of his career years for Torpedo Ust-Kamenogorsk and stayed there until 1988. In 1988, he joined to Avtomobilist Karagandy. 1992, he signed a contract with Metallurg Magnitogorsk and played 4 years for them. He has competed at the IIHF World Championship Division II with Team Kazakhstan in 1993. He ended his professional career in 1995-96 season. In 1997, he started his coaching career as an assistant coach of Kazakhstan men's national ice hockey team. In 1998 Winter Olympics, he was an assistant of Boris Alexandrov at the Team Kazakhstan's coaching staff. They reached a quarter final, when they lost to Team Canada. In 2002, he promoted Kazakhstan U18 National Team to World Championships elite division.

== Coaching career ==
- 1997–2001 Kazakhstan U20 National Team – assistant coach
- 2001–2002 Kazakhstan U18 National Team – head coach
- 2002–2003 Barys Astana – head coach
- 2003–2007 Gornyak Rudny – head coach
- 2007 Barys Astana – head coach
- 2008–2009 Kazakhmys Satpaev – head coach
- 2010–2012 Gornyak Rudny – head coach
- 2012 Kazzinc-Torpedo – head coach

Sporting positions
Preceded by Nikolai Myshagin	Head coach of the Barys Astana; 2002–03	Succeeded by Anatoli Melikhov
Preceded by Nikolai Myshagin	Head coach of the Barys Astana; 2007 (interim)	Succeeded by Alexander Vysotsky
Preceded by Oleg Bolyakin	Head coach of the Kazzinc-Torpedo; 2012 (interim)	Succeeded by Igor Dorokhin
