= Igor Stepanov (ice hockey) =

Russian ice hockey player

- Born: August 3, 1970 (age 54); Saratov, Russian SFSR, Soviet Union
- Height: 5 ft 11 in (180 cm)
- Weight: 174 lb (79 kg; 12 st 6 lb)
- Position: Centre
- Shot: Left
- Played for: Kristall Saratov; Khimik Engels; Progress-SHVSM Grodno; Ak Bars Kazan
- National team: Russia
- Playing career: 1988–2007

Igor Stepanov (born August 3, 1970) is a Soviet and a Russian former professional ice hockey forward. He is a one-time Russian Champion

== Career statistics ==
			Regular season					Playoffs
Season	Team	League	GP	G	A	Pts	PIM	GP	G	A	Pts	PIM
1988–89	Kristall Saratov	Soviet2	55	15	12	27	24	—	—	—	—	—
1988–89	Khimik Engels	Soviet3	16	10	7	17	0	—	—	—	—	—
1989–90	Progress-ShVSM Grodno	Soviet2	61	8	6	14	26	—	—	—	—	—
1991–92	Kristall Saratov	Soviet2	80	23	7	30	49	—	—	—	—	—
1992–93	Kristall Saratov	Russia	42	3	6	9	18	—	—	—	—	—
1993–94	Kristall Saratov	Russia	46	14	9	23	62	—	—	—	—	—
1994–95	Kristall Saratov	Russia	52	21	20	41	74	—	—	—	—	—
1994–95	Khimik Engels	Russia2	4	2	2	4	0	—	—	—	—	—
1995–96	Kristall Saratov	Russia	47	15	6	21	28	2	0	0	0	0
1996–97	Kristall Saratov	Russia	44	18	16	34	20	5	0	1	1	8
1997–98	Ak Bars Kazan	Russia	46	15	14	29	36	7	1	2	3	4
1998–99	Ak Bars Kazan	Russia	41	4	6	10	30	5	0	0	0	4
1998–99	Ak Bars Kazan-2	Russia3	1	0	1	1	2	—	—	—	—	—
1999–00	Ak Bars Kazan	Russia	32	10	8	18	14	8	1	3	4	2
1999–00	Ak Bars Kazan-2	Russia3	4	2	3	5	0	—	—	—	—	—
2000–01	Ak Bars Kazan	Russia	31	7	7	14	12	3	0	0	0	2
2000–01	Ak Bars Kazan-2	Russia3	2	0	1	1	2	—	—	—	—	—
2001–02	Kristall Saratov	Russia2	56	15	21	36	102	—	—	—	—	—
2002–03	Kristall Saratov	Russia2	48	14	17	31	54	—	—	—	—	—
2003–04	Kristall Saratov	Russia2	60	14	27	41	50	4	0	0	0	0
2004–05	Kristall Saratov	Russia2	52	14	16	30	46	4	2	0	2	4
2005–06	Kristall Saratov	Russia2	56	15	13	28	68	—	—	—	—	—
2006–07	Kristall Saratov	Russia2	52	12	18	30	66	3	1	0	1	2
Russia totals			381	107	92	199	294	30	2	6	8	20
Russia2 totals			328	86	114	200	386	11	3	0	3	6

== Awards and honors ==
Award	Year
Russian Superleague
Winner (Ak Bars Kazan)	1998
