= Vladimir Kiselev (ice hockey) =

Soviet ice hockey player and coach

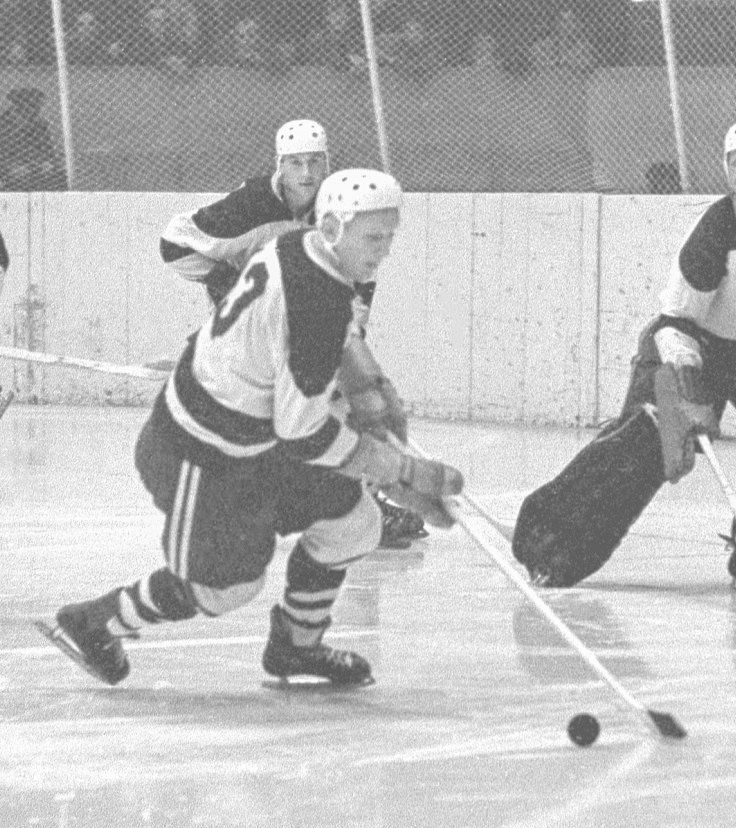
- Born: October 4, 1936
- Died: August 14, 1999 (aged 62)
- Position: Winger
- Played for: Burevestnik Chelyabinsk; Traktor Chelyabinsk; CSKA Moscow; Dynamo Moscow
- National team: Soviet Union
- Playing career: 1953–1967

Vladimir Vladimirovich Kiselev (Russian: Киселёв Владимир Борисович; October 4, 1936 – August 14, 1999) was an ice hockey player and an ice hockey coach. He is the "Master of Sport of USSR" and honored coach of Russian Federation. He awarded the Medal "For Labour Valour".

== Career ==
Vladimir Kiselev started his career as a bandy player in 1948 at the "Dynamo Chelyabinsk". In 1953, he switched to ice hockey. He is one of the most successful wingers in Soviet hockey history. He played 323 matches and scored 199 goals (1954—1957 "Burevestnik Chelyabinsk" - 28 matches, 21 goals, 1957—1958 "Traktor Chelyabinsk" - 32 matches, 17 goals, 1958—1962 "CSKA Moscow" - 110 matches, 84 goals, 1962—1967 "Dynamo Moscow" - 153 matches, 67 goals).

== Coaching career ==
- 1967-1970 Dizel Penza - player-coach
- 1971-1973 Torpedo Ust-Kamenogorsk - head coach
- 1974-1981 Dynamo Moscow - assistant coach
- 1981-1983 Dynamo Moscow - head coach
- 1985 USSR Youth National Team - head coach
