= Vladimir Plyuschev =

Russian ice hockey coach

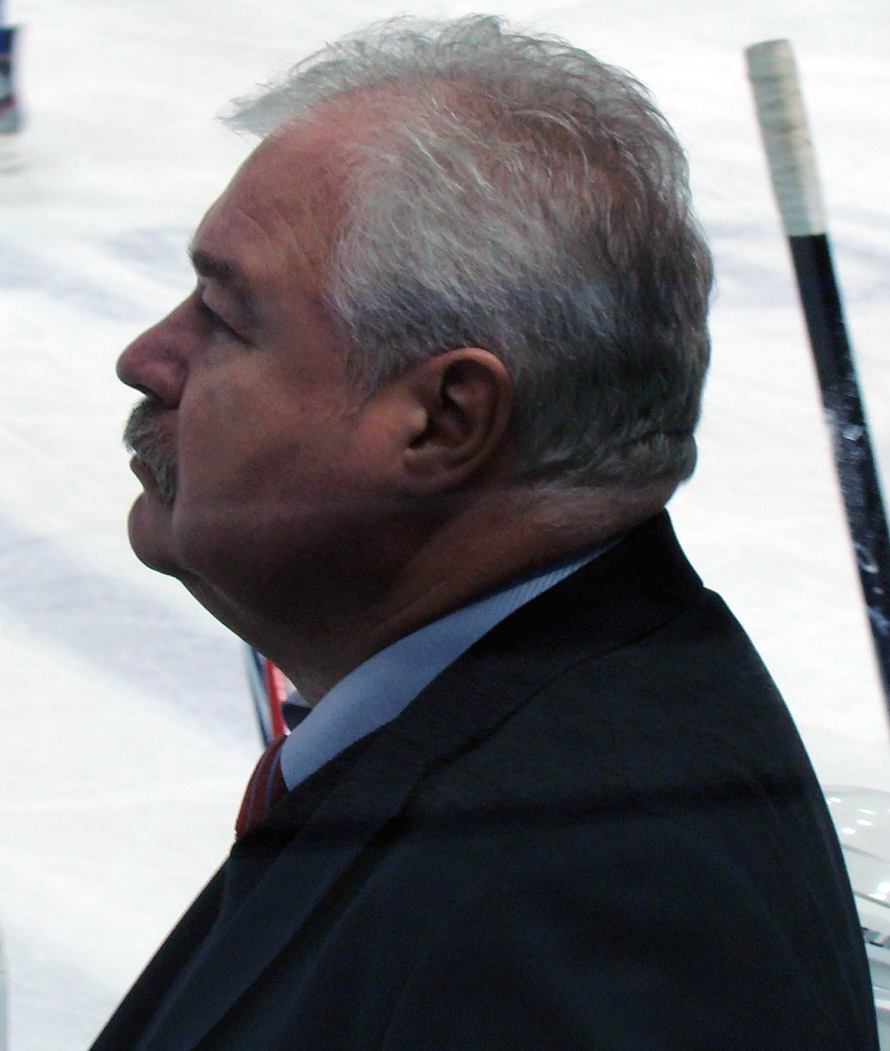
- Born: Vladimir Plyuschev; February 8, 1955 (age 70); Moscow, Soviet Union
- Occupation: ice hockey coach

Vladimir Anatolievich Plyuschev (Russian: Владимир Анатольевич Плющев; born February 8, 1955) is a Russian professional ice hockey coach. He is currently a head coach of the Kazzinc-Torpedo of the Supreme Hockey League (VHL).
