= Alexander Mayer =

Alexander Mayer may refer to:

- Sandy Mayer (born 1952), American tennis player
- Alexander Mayer (ice hockey)
- Alexander Mayer (swimmer), West German swimmer in the 1988 Summer Olympics
- Alexander Mayer (motorcyclist), Austrian motorcyclist who competed in the 1953 Grand Prix motorcycle racing season

== See also ==
- Alexander Meyer (disambiguation)
