= Maksim Belyayev =

Maksim Belyayev may refer to:

- Maksim Belyayev (ice hockey) (born 1979), Kazakhstani ice hockey player
- Maksim Belyayev (footballer) (born 1991), Russian football player
