= Igor Stepanov =

Igor Stepanov may refer to:

- Igor Stepanov (ice hockey) (born 1970), Soviet and Russian ice hockey player
- Igors Stepanovs (born 1966), Soviet and Latvian football player
- Igors Stepanovs (born 1976), Latvian football player
