= Vladimir Goltze =

- Born: Vladimir Nikolaevich Goltze; September 4, 1951 (age 75); Ust-Kamenogorsk, Kazakh SSR, Soviet Union
- Occupation: ice hockey coach

Vladimir Nikolaevich Goltze (Russian: Владимир Николаевич Гольц, born September 9, 1951) is a Kazakhstani professional ice hockey coach. He served as a head coach of the Kazakhstan men's national ice hockey team at the 2006 Winter Olympics.

== Coaching career ==
Vladimir Goltze was born in Ust-Kamenogorsk, and began his coaching career as a junior team coach of Torpedo Ust-Kamenogorsk. In 1979, he led his junior team to victory at the Soviet Union Junior Championships, which took place in Ust-Kamenogorsk. In 1981, he awarded as an honored coach of Kazakh SSR. This year, he started to work at the Torpedo as an assistant of head coach of Victor Semykin. In 1986, Goltze assigned as a head coach and managed the team 8 seasons in a row. That seasons was a most successful in a Torpedo history, when they played at the Soviet Hockey League's highest division. He is the first head coach of Independent Kazakhstan's men's national ice hockey team. In 1994, he was fired from both of responsibilities and he went to Russian Novosibirsk. He has worked in a children hockey system there. In 2002 and 2008, he officiated the head coaching role at the Sibir Novosibirsk.
