= Vladimir Koptsov =

Soviet and Kazakhstani ice hockey player and coach

- Born: Vladimir Koptsov; January 26, 1950 (age 75); Ust-Kamenogorsk, Kazakh SSR, Soviet Union
- Occupation: ice hockey coach

Vladimir Ilyich Koptsov (Russian: Владимир Ильич Копцов, born January 26, 1950) is a former Soviet and Kazakhstani professional ice hockey player and ice hockey coach. He played for Avangard Omsk and Torpedo Ust-Kamenogorsk at the Soviet Era. In 1994-95 season, he was in head coach role in Torpedo Ust-Kamenogorsk and Kazakhstan men's national ice hockey team. Koptsov was the assistant coach at the MHL team Snezhnye Barsy, during 2012-13 season.

== Coaching career ==
- 1992 Soviet Union national junior's ice hockey team - head coach
- 1994-1995 Torpedo Ust-Kamenogorsk - head coach
- 1994-1995 Kazakhstan men's national ice hockey team - head coach
- 1995-1998 Avangard Omsk - assistant coach
- 1998-2000 Amur Khabarovsk - assistant coach
- 2002-2003 Amur Khabarovsk - assistant coach
- 2010-2013 Snezhnye Barsy - assistant coach
