= Igor Dorokhin =

Kazakhstani-German ice hockey player (born 1962)

- Born: August 15, 1962 (age 63) Ust-Kamenogorsk, Kazakh SSR, Soviet Union
- Height: 5 ft 11 in (180 cm)
- Weight: 185 lb (84 kg; 13 st 3 lb)
- Position: Center
- Shot: Left
- Played for: Torpedo Ust-Kamenogorsk; Kölner Haie; EHC Freiburg; Eisbären Berlin; Heilbronner Falken; Augsburger Panther
- National team: Kazakhstan
- Playing career: 1980–2011

Igor Lvovich Dorokhin (Russian: Игорь Львович Дорохин; born August 15, 1962) is a former Kazakhstani-German professional ice hockey player, who played for Kazakhstan National Hockey Team. He is the former head coach of Kazzinc-Torpedo and his farm club Kazzinc-Torpedo-2.

== Career ==
Igor Dorokhin is the graduate of Ust Kamenogorsk ice hockey school. He has begun his playing career at the youth Torpedo Ust-Kamenogorsk team. In 1979, he won in the Soviet Union Youth Hockey Championships. That team was under his first professional coach Vladimir Goltze. From 1984 to 1992, he played for basic team of Torpedo Ust-Kamenogorsk. After Soviet Union collapse, he went to play in Germany. He won at the Eishockey-Bundesliga in 1995, when he was playing for EHC Freiburg. He has lived in Germany 19 years and finished his career in 2012. After that, he come back to Kazakhstan and assigned as an assistant coach of Kazzinc-Torpedo-2. In 2012–13, he was the head coach of Kazzinc-Torpedo.

== Career statistics ==
=== Regular season and playoffs ===
			Regular season					Playoffs
Season	Team	League	GP	G	A	Pts	PIM	GP	G	A	Pts	PIM
1980–81	Torpedo Ust–Kamenogorsk	URS.2	18	1	0	1	2	—	—	—	—	—
1981–82	Torpedo Ust–Kamenogorsk	URS.2	62	21	13	34	48	—	—	—	—	—
1982–83	Torpedo Ust–Kamenogorsk	URS.2	66	18				—	—	—	—	—
1983–84	Torpedo Ust–Kamenogorsk	URS.2	54	9				—	—	—	—	—
1984–85	Torpedo Ust–Kamenogorsk	URS.2	52	15	10	25	49	—	—	—	—	—
1985–86	Torpedo Ust–Kamenogorsk	URS.2	64	11	16	27	69	—	—	—	—	—
1986–87	Torpedo Ust–Kamenogorsk	URS.2	53	18	13	31	52	—	—	—	—	—
1987–88	Torpedo Ust–Kamenogorsk	URS	21	2	3	5	21	—	—	—	—	—
1988–89	Torpedo Ust–Kamenogorsk	URS.2	68	18	19	37	56	—	—	—	—	—
1989–90	Torpedo Ust–Kamenogorsk	URS	29	5	4	9	22	—	—	—	—	—
1990–91	Torpedo Ust–Kamenogorsk	URS	45	16	10	26	52	—	—	—	—	—
1991–92	Torpedo Ust–Kamenogorsk	CIS	32	5	12	17	20	6	1	2	3	8
1992–93	Kölner EC	1.GBun	44	12	19	31	56	12	3	6	9	18
1993–94	Kölner EC	1.GBun	42	11	20	31	71	10	5	2	7	10
1994–95	EHC Freiburg III	GER.3	52	35	79	114	125	—	—	—	—	—
1995–96	Eisbären Berlin	DEL	47	13	39	52	94	—	—	—	—	—
1996–97	Heilbronner EC	GER.2	40	15	39	54	91	11	5	8	13	22
1997–98	Heilbronner EC	GER.2	49	19	41	60	141	—	—	—	—	—
1998–99	EHC Freiburg II	GER.2	55	17	35	52	92	—	—	—	—	—
1999–2000	EHC Freiburg II	GER.2	46	10	34	44	105	8	2	4	6	20
2000–01	Heilbronner EC	GER.2	35	10	19	29	40	10	1	6	7	16
2001–02	Heilbronner EC	GER.2	48	3	27	30	109	7	1	4	5	6
2002–03	Augsburger Panther	DEL	12	1	3	4	33	—	—	—	—	—
2002–03	Heilbronner EC	GER.2	18	2	8	10	12	4	1	1	2	6
2003–04	Heilbronner Falken	GER.2	15	1	9	10	22	—	—	—	—	—
2004–05	Heilbronner Falken	GER.3	30	11	27	38	116	10	0	3	3	14
2005–06	Heilbronner Falken	GER.3	32	3	32	35	98	4	1	1	2	43
2006–07	ESV Hügelsheim	GER.4	26	6	30	36	36	—	—	—	—	—
2007–08	ESV Hügelsheim	GER.4	15	5	20	25	63	14	5	15	20	42
2008–09	EHC Eisbären Heilbronn	GER.4	8	2	13	15	32	6	1	6	7	60
2009–10	ESC Bad Liebenzell	GER.4	10	5	12	17	24	—	—	—	—	—
2010–11	ESC Bad Liebenzell	GER.4	6	1	6	7	12	—	—	—	—	—
2010–11	EHC Eisbären Heilbronn	GER.4	13	9	18	27	56	—	—	—	—	—
URS.2 totals			320	84	71	155	276	—	—	—	—	—
URS/CIS totals			127	28	29	57	115	6	1	2	3	8
GER.2 totals			260	67	178	245	507	32	8	19	27	50

- URS.2 totals do not include numbers from the 1982–83 and 1983–84 seasons.

=== International ===
Year	Team	Event	GP	G	A	Pts	PIM
1996	Kazakhstan	WC C	7	6	5	11	31
1997	Kazakhstan	WC B	7	1	3	4	16
1998	Kazakhstan	OG	7	0	0	0	4
2000	Kazakhstan	OGQ	3	0	2	2	8
Senior totals			24	7	10	17	59

== Achievements ==
- 1993 - (silver) Eishockey-Bundesliga
- 1995 - (gold) Deutsche Eishockey Liga
- 1996 - (gold) IIHF World Championship Division II
- 1997 - (silver) IIHF World Championship Division I
