= 1993–94 Kazakhstan Hockey Championship =

- League: Kazakhstan Hockey Championship
- Sport: Ice Hockey
- Number of teams: 5

Regular season
- Champions: Torpedo Ust-Kamenogorsk
- Runners-up: Stroitel Karagandy

Kazakhstan Hockey Championship seasons
- ← 1992–93 1994–95 →

The 1993–94 Kazakhstan Hockey Championship was the second season of the Kazakhstan Hockey Championship, the top level of ice hockey in Kazakhstan. Five teams participated in the league, and Torpedo Ust-Kamenogorsk won the championship.

== Standings ==
	GP	W	T	L	GF:GA	Pts
Torpedo Ust-Kamenogorsk	12	10	1	1	94:21	21:3
Stroitel Karagandy	12	7	1	4	46:38	15:9
Bulat Temirtau	12	3	4	5	45:59	10:14
Torpedo Ust-Kamenogorsk-2	12	3	3	6	42:60	9:15
Torpedo Ust-Kamenogorsk Juniors	12	2	1	9	29:78	5:19
