= Dmitri Vanyasov =

Russian ice hockey player

- Born: May 9, 1972 (age 52); Penza, Russian SFSR, Soviet Union
- Height: 6 ft 0 in (183 cm)
- Weight: 181 lb (82 kg; 12 st 13 lb)
- Position: Left wing
- Played for: Dizelist Penza; CSK VVS Samara; Rubin Tyumen; Ak Bars Kazan; HC Neftekhimik Nizhnekamsk; Torpedo Nizhny Novgorod; Sibir Novosibirsk; Sputnik Nizhny Tagil
- Playing career: 1989–2004

Dmitri Vanyasov (born May 9, 1972) is a Soviet and Russian former professional ice hockey forward. He is a one-time Russian champion.

== Awards and honors ==
Award	Year
RSL
Winner (Ak Bars Kazan)	1998
