= 2007–08 IIHF Continental Cup =

International ice hockey competition

The Continental Cup 2007–08 was the 11th edition of the IIHF Continental Cup. The season started on September 14, 2007, and finished on January 6, 2008.

The tournament was won by Ak Bars Kazan, who led the final group.

The points system used in this tournament was: the winner in regular time won 3 points, the loser 0 points; in case of a tie, an overtime and a penalty shootout is played, the winner in penalty shootouts or overtime won 2 points and the loser won 1 point.

== Preliminary round ==
=== Group A ===
(Miercurea Ciuc, Romania)

| Team #1 | Score | Team #2 |
|---|---|---|
| KHL Mladost (Croatia) | 9:8 (OT) | (Turkey) Kocaeli B.B. Kağıt |
| SC Miercurea Ciuc (Romania) | 13:2 | (Spain) Club Gel Puigcerdà |
| KHL Mladost (Croatia) | 9:1 | (Spain) Club Gel Puigcerdà |
| SC Miercurea Ciuc (Romania) | 10:4 | (Turkey) Kocaeli B.B. Kağıt |
| Kocaeli B.B. Kağıt (Turkey) | 5:4 | (Spain) Club Gel Puigcerdà |
| SC Miercurea Ciuc (Romania) | 8:1 | (Croatia) KHL Mladost |

=== Group A standings ===
| Rank | Team | Points |
|---|---|---|
| 1 | (Romania) SC Miercurea Ciuc | 9 |
| 2 | (Croatia) KHL Mladost | 5 |
| 3 | (Turkey) Kocaeli B.B. Kağıt | 4 |
| 4 | (Spain) Club Gel Puigcerdà | 0 |

== First Group Stage ==
=== Group B ===
(Aalborg, Denmark)

| Team #1 | Score | Team #2 |
|---|---|---|
| EC Red Bull Salzburg (Austria) | 8:0 | (Slovenia) HK Slavija Ljubljana |
| AaB Aalborg (Denmark) | 3:0 | (United Kingdom) Coventry Blaze |
| AaB Aalborg (Denmark) | 4:2 | (Slovenia) HK Slavija Ljubljana |
| Coventry Blaze (United Kingdom) | 3:2 | (Austria) EC Red Bull Salzburg |
| HK Slavija Ljubljana (Slovenia) | 4:2 | (United Kingdom) Coventry Blaze |
| AaB Aalborg (Denmark) | 4:2 | (Austria) EC Red Bull Salzburg |

=== Group B standings ===
| Rank | Team | Points |
|---|---|---|
| 1 | (Denmark) AaB Aalborg | 9 |
| 2 | (Austria) EC Red Bull Salzburg | 4 |
| 3 | (Slovenia) HK Slavija Ljubljana | 3 |
| 4 | (United Kingdom) Coventry Blaze | 2 |

=== Group C ===
(Tilburg, Netherlands)

| Team #1 | Score | Team #2 |
|---|---|---|
| SC Energija (Lithuania) | 6:5 (OT) | (Croatia) KHL Mladost |
| Tilburg Trappers (Netherlands) | 5:4 | (Hungary) Dunaújvárosi Acélbikák |
| Dunaújvárosi Acélbikák (Hungary) | 8:2 | (Croatia) KHL Mladost |
| Tilburg Trappers (Netherlands) | 8:3 | (Lithuania) SC Energija |
| Dunaújvárosi Acélbikák (Hungary) | 4:1 | (Lithuania) SC Energija |
| Tilburg Trappers (Netherlands) | 8:4 | (Croatia) KHL Mladost |

=== Group C standings ===
| Rank | Team | Points |
|---|---|---|
| 1 | (Netherlands) Tilburg Trappers | 9 |
| 2 | (Hungary) Dunaújvárosi Acélbikák | 6 |
| 3 | (Lithuania) SC Energija | 2 |
| 4 | (Croatia) KHL Mladost | 1 |

=== Group D ===
(Nowy Targ, Poland)

| Team #1 | Score | Team #2 |
|---|---|---|
| Yunost Minsk (Belarus) | 9:0 | (Romania) SC Miercurea Ciuc |
| Podhale Nowy Targ (Poland) | 5:2 | (Kazakhstan) Kazzinc-Torpedo |
| Podhale Nowy Targ (Poland) | 3:3 (1:0 PS) | (Romania) SC Miercurea Ciuc |
| Kazzinc-Torpedo (Kazakhstan) | 5:1 | (Belarus) Yunost Minsk |
| Kazzinc-Torpedo (Kazakhstan) | 4:2 | (Romania) SC Miercurea Ciuc |
| Podhale Nowy Targ (Poland) | 3:8 | (Belarus) Yunost Minsk |

=== Group D standings ===
| Rank | Team | Points | |
|---|---|---|---|
| 1 | (Kazakhstan) Kazzinc-Torpedo | 6 | (GF:5;GA:1) |
| 2 | (Belarus) Yunost Minsk | 6 | (GF:1;GA:5) |
| 3 | (Poland) Podhale Nowy Targ | 5 | |
| 4 | (Romania) SC Miercurea Ciuc | 1 | |

(France) Brûleurs de Loups Grenoble : bye

== Second Group Stage ==
=== Group E ===
(Grenoble, France)

| Team #1 | Score | Team #2 |
|---|---|---|
| AaB Aalborg (Denmark) | 4:2 | (Netherlands) Tilburg Trappers |
| Brûleurs de Loups Grenoble (France) | 1:2 | (Kazakhstan) Kazzinc-Torpedo |
| Kazzinc-Torpedo (Kazakhstan) | 4:1 | (Denmark) AaB Aalborg |
| Brûleurs de Loups Grenoble (France) | 6:3 | (Netherlands) Tilburg Trappers |
| Kazzinc-Torpedo (Kazakhstan) | 12:0 | (Netherlands) Tilburg Trappers |
| Brûleurs de Loups Grenoble (France) | 2:2 (0:1 PS) | (Denmark) AaB Aalborg |

=== Group E standings ===
| Rank | Team | Points |
|---|---|---|
| 1 | (Kazakhstan) Kazzinc-Torpedo | 9 |
| 2 | (Denmark) AaB Aalborg | 5 |
| 3 | (France) Brûleurs de Loups Grenoble | 4 |
| 4 | (Netherlands) Tilburg Trappers | 0 |

(Latvia) HK Riga 2000, (Russia) Ak Bars Kazan : bye

== Final stage ==
=== Final Group ===
(Riga, Latvia)

| Team #1 | Score | Team #2 |
|---|---|---|
| Ak Bars Kazan (Russia) | 2:1 | (Kazakhstan) Kazzinc-Torpedo |
| HK Riga 2000 (Latvia) | 7:2 | (Denmark) AaB Aalborg |
| Ak Bars Kazan (Russia) | 4:1 | (Denmark) AaB Aalborg |
| HK Riga 2000 (Latvia) | 3:4 | (Kazakhstan) Kazzinc-Torpedo |
| AaB Aalborg (Denmark) | 5:3 | (Kazakhstan) Kazzinc-Torpedo |
| HK Riga 2000 (Latvia) | 2:6 | (Russia) Ak Bars Kazan |

=== Final Group standings ===
| Rank | Team | Points | |
|---|---|---|---|
| 1 | (Russia) Ak Bars Kazan | 9 | |
| 2 | (Latvia) HK Riga 2000 | 3 | (GF:10;GA:6) |
| 3 | (Kazakhstan) Kazzinc-Torpedo | 3 | (GF:7;GA:8) |
| 4 | (Denmark) AaB Aalborg | 3 | (GF:7;GA:10) |
