= 2008–09 Kazakhstan Hockey Championship =

- League: Kazakhstan Hockey Championship
- Sport: Ice Hockey
- Number of teams: 8

Regular season
- Champions: Barys Astana
- Runners-up: Kazzinc-Torpedo

Kazakhstan Hockey Championship seasons
- ← 2007–08 2009–10 →

The 2008–09 Kazakhstan Hockey Championship was the 17th season of the Kazakhstan Hockey Championship, the top level of ice hockey in Kazakhstan. Eight teams participated in the league, and Barys Astana won the championship.

== Standings ==
=== First round ===
	GP	W	OTW	OTL	L	GF:GA	Pts
Kazakhmys Satpaev	10	10	0	0	0	102:22	30
Gornyak Rudny	6	6	0	0	0	60:8	18
Yertis Pavlodar	14	5	0	1	8	45:88	16
Kazzinc-Torpedo-2	6	1	1	0	4	30:25	5
Barys Astana-2	12	1	0	0	11	15:109	3

=== Final round ===
	GP	W	OTW	OTL	L	GF:GA	Pts
Barys Astana	5	4	1	0	0	29:8	14
Kazzinc-Torpedo	5	4	0	1	0	23:8	13
Kazakhmys Satpaev	5	3	0	0	2	18:20	9
Saryarka Karagandy	5	2	0	0	3	17:13	6
Gornyak Rudny	5	1	0	0	4	12:22	3
Yertis Pavlodar	5	0	0	0	5	8:36	0
