= 1996–97 Kazakhstan Hockey Championship =

- League: Kazakhstan Hockey Championship
- Sport: Ice Hockey
- Number of teams: 5

Regular season
- Champions: Torpedo Ust-Kamenogorsk
- Runners-up: Torpedo Ust-Kamenogorsk-2

Kazakhstan Hockey Championship seasons
- ← 1995–96 1997–98 →

The 1996–97 Kazakhstan Hockey Championship was the fifth season of the Kazakhstan Hockey Championship, the top level of ice hockey in Kazakhstan. Five teams participated in the league, and Torpedo Ust-Kamenogorsk won the championship.

== Standings ==
	GP	W	T	L	GF:GA	Pts
Torpedo Ust-Kamenogorsk	8	7	0	1	84:27	14:2
Torpedo Ust-Kamenogorsk-2	8	6	0	2	58:42	12:4
Torpedo Ust-Kamenogorsk U18	8	4	0	4	46:52	8:8
Bulat Temirtau	8	2	0	6	39:30	4:12
Torpedo Ust-Kamenogorsk U17	8	1	0	7	22:98	2:14
