= Akzholtay Sports Palace =

Coordinates: 49°48′04″N 73°05′05″E

- Ақжолтай спорт сарайы
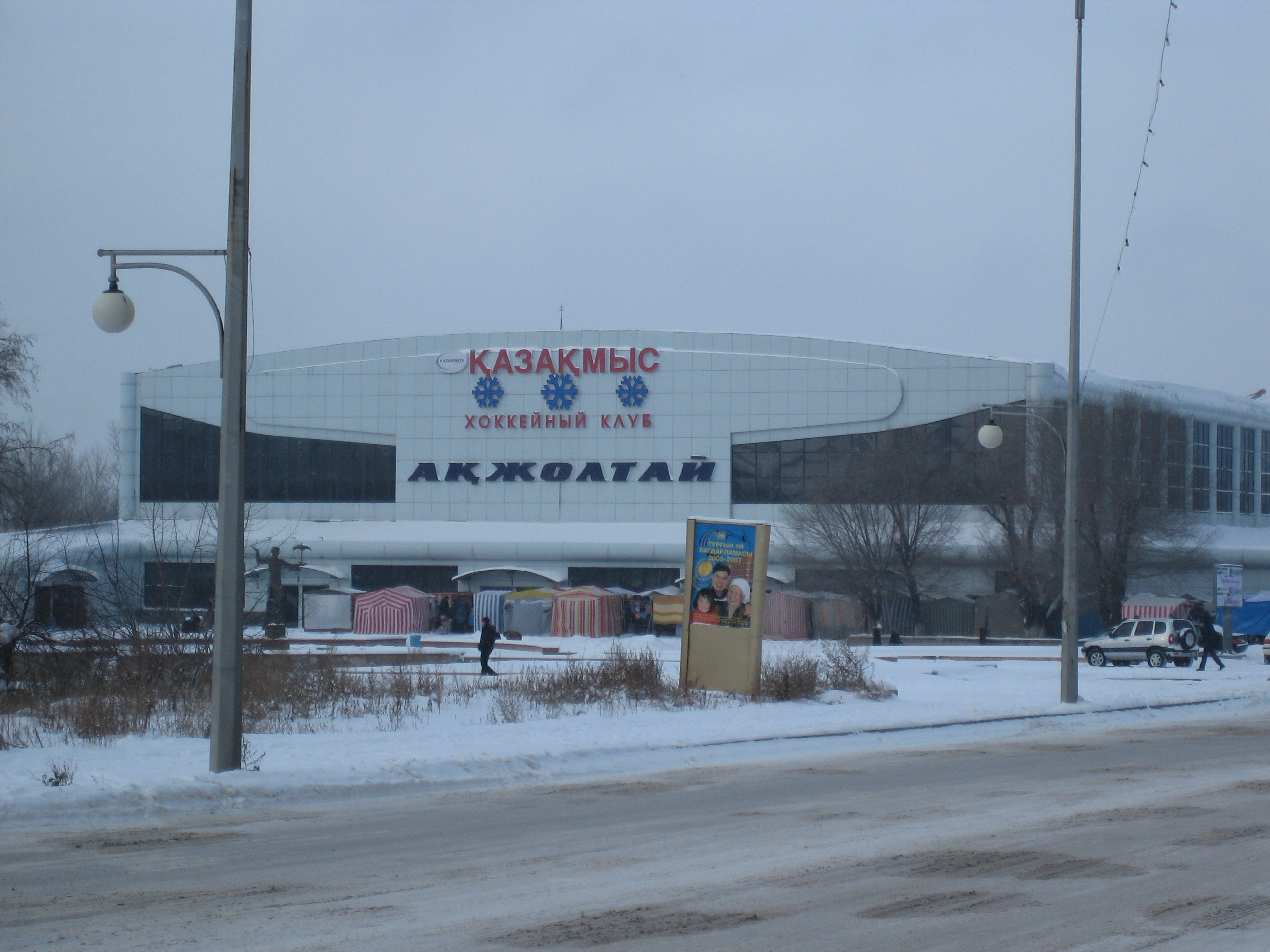
- Interactive map of Akzholtay Sports Palace
- Location: Karagandy, Kazakhstan
- Capacity: 2,500

Construction
- Opened: 1972

Tenants
- Avtomobilist Karagandy (1972–2000); Saryarka Karagandy (2006–2012)

Akzholtay Sports Palace (Kazakh: Ақжолтай спорт сарайы, Aqjoltaı sport saraıy) is an ice hockey indoor arena in Karagandy, Kazakhstan. The former home arena of Avtomobilist Karagandy and Saryarka Karagandy hockey club.
