= Alexander Meyer =

Alexander or Alex Meyer may refer to:

- Alexander Meyer (footballer, born 1983), German former football defender
- Alex Meyer (swimmer) (born 1988), American former open water and long-distance swimmer
- Alex Meyer (baseball) (born 1990), American former professional baseball pitcher
- Alexander Meyer (footballer, born 1991), German football goalkeeper
- Bertie Alexander Meyer (1877–1967), British theatre producer and entrepreneur

== See also ==
- Alexander Mayer (disambiguation)
- Alexander Meier (born 1983), German footballer
