= Igor Kuznetsov (ice hockey) =

Kazakhstani-German ice hockey player

- Born: October 19, 1955; Alma-Ata, Kazakh SSR, Soviet Union
- Height: 5 ft 10 in (178 cm)
- Weight: 168 lb (76 kg; 12 st 0 lb)
- Position: Center
- Played for: Burevestnik Alma-Ata; Avtomobilist Karaganda; SKA Novosibirsk; Torpedo Ust-Kamenogorsk; HPK; EC Ratingen
- Playing career: 1971–1993

Igor Mikhailovich Kuznetsov (Russian: Игорь Михайлович Кузнецов; born October 19, 1955) is a Kazakhstani-German retired professional ice hockey player. He is currently an executive and founding chairman of the KIMEX and Grazie chain stores.

== Career ==
Igor Kuznetsov is the graduate of Alma-Ata ice hockey school. He began his playing career at the Burevestnik Alma-Ata team. However, his best years he played for Torpedo Ust-Kamenogorsk, when he captained 10 years and was team top scorer three times in 1984-85 (76 points: 43 G, 33 A), 1985-86 (98 points: 53 G, 45 A) and 1988-89 (90 points: 44 G, 46 A) seasons. After Soviet Union collapse, he went to play to Finnish team HPK, where he helped to win bronze medals at SM-liiga in 1991. In 1991, Kuznetsov signed a contract with German team EC Ratingen and helped to promote them to 2nd Bundesliga. He played 43 games and scored 37 goals. Next season he ended his career because of a foot fracture.

== Career statistics ==
| | | | Regular season | | | | | Playoffs |
| Season | Team | League | GP | G | A | Pts | PIM | GP | G | A | Pts | PIM |
|---|---|---|---|---|---|---|---|---|---|---|---|---|
| 1984-85 | Torpedo Ust-Kamenogorsk | USSR-2 | 51 | 43 | 33 | 76 | 20 | — | — | — | — | — |
| 1985-86 | Torpedo Ust-Kamenogorsk | USSR-2 | 64 | 53 | 45 | 98 | 48 | — | — | — | — | — |
| 1986-87 | Torpedo Ust-Kamenogorsk | USSR-2 | 63 | 61 | 38 | 99 | 46 | — | — | — | — | — |
| 1987-88 | Torpedo Ust-Kamenogorsk | USSR | 26 | 20 | 7 | 27 | 12 | — | — | — | — | — |
| 1987-88 | Torpedo Ust-Kamenogorsk | USSR-2 | 36 | 26 | 23 | 49 | 28 | — | — | — | — | — |
| 1988-89 | Torpedo Ust-Kamenogorsk | USSR-2 | 61 | 44 | 46 | 90 | 26 | — | — | — | — | — |
| 1989-90 | HPK | SM-liiga | 44 | 18 | 51 | 69 | 12 | — | — | — | — | — |
| 1990-91 | HPK | SM-liiga | 44 | 13 | 25 | 38 | 18 | 8 | 1 | 1 | 2 | 0 |
| 1991-92 | EC Ratingen | 2.BL | 29 | 28 | 31 | 59 | 28 | 14 | 9 | 12 | 21 | 10 |
| 1992-93 | EC Ratingen | 1.BL | 5 | 1 | 4 | 5 | 4 | — | — | — | — | — |
| USSR totals | | | 26 | 20 | 7 | 27 | 12 | — | — | — | — | — |
