= 1995–96 Kazakhstan Hockey Championship =

- League: Kazakhstan Hockey Championship
- Sport: Ice Hockey
- Number of teams: 4

Regular season
- Champions: Torpedo Ust-Kamenogorsk
- Runners-up: Stroitel Karagandy

Kazakhstan Hockey Championship seasons
- ← 1994–95 1996–97 →

The 1995–96 Kazakhstan Hockey Championship was the fourth season of the Kazakhstan Hockey Championship, the top level of ice hockey in Kazakhstan. Four teams participated in the league, and Torpedo Ust-Kamenogorsk won the championship.

== Standings ==
	GP	W	T	L	GF:GA	Pts
Torpedo Ust-Kamenogorsk	6	6	0	0	54:16	12:0
Stroitel Karagandy	6	4	0	2	38:24	8:4
Torpedo Ust-Kamenogorsk-2	6	2	0	4	27:47	4:8
Bulat Temirtau	6	0	0	6	25:57	0:12
