= Andrei Raisky =

Kazakhstani ice hockey player

- Born: March 30, 1970 Ust-Kamenogorsk, Kazakh SSR, Soviet Union
- Height: 6 ft 2 in (188 cm)
- Weight: 203 lb (92 kg; 14 st 7 lb)
- Position: Centre
- Shot: Right
- Played for: Torpedo Ust-Kamenogorsk; Dayton Bombers; Moncton Hawks; CSKA Moscow; Gothiques d'Amiens; Milano Vipers; Metallurg Novokuznetsk; Sibir Novosibirsk; SKA Saint Petersburg; Aalborg Pirates; Yuzhny Ural Orsk; Yunost Minsk; Barys Astana
- National team: Kazakhstan
- NHL draft: 156th overall, 1992; Winnipeg Jets
- Playing career: 1987–2005

Andrei Alexandrovich Raisky (Russian: Андрей Александрович Райский, born March 30, 1970) is a retired Kazakhstani ice hockey player, who played for Kazakhstan National Hockey Team. Andrei Raisky is the graduate of Ust-Kamenogorsk ice hockey school. He drafted 156th overall in the round seven of 1992 NHL entry draft by Winnipeg Jets, but never signed a contract with them.
