= 1994–95 Kazakhstan Hockey Championship =

- League: Kazakhstan Hockey Championship
- Sport: Ice Hockey
- Number of teams: 4

Regular season
- Champions: Torpedo Ust-Kamenogorsk
- Runners-up: Bulat Temirtau

Kazakhstan Hockey Championship seasons
- ← 1993–94 1995–96 →

The 1994–95 Kazakhstan Hockey Championship was the third season of the Kazakhstan Hockey Championship, the top level of ice hockey in Kazakhstan. Four teams participated in the league, and Torpedo Ust-Kamenogorsk won the championship.

== Standings ==
| | GP | W | T | L | GF:GA | Pts |
|---|---|---|---|---|---|---|
| Torpedo Ust-Kamenogorsk | 12 | 10 | 1 | 1 | 88:29 | 21:3 |
| Bulat Temirtau | 12 | 7 | 1 | 4 | 48:41 | 15:9 |
| Stroitel Karagandy | 12 | 6 | 0 | 6 | 30:57 | 12:12 |
| Torpedo Ust-Kamenogorsk-2 | 12 | 0 | 0 | 12 | 28:67 | 0:24 |
