= Film session =

Rewatching of a sports event

A film session involves the use of a 35 mm movie projector and/or VCR/DVD/DVR player to project images portrayed of a sporting event. The visual analysis of an upcoming game or previous game by the coaching staff with or without players.

The term was coined by the NFL in reference to making a better defense or offense while preparing for the next Sunday's opponent by choreographing the weaknesses shown by the game tape thus opening up the chances for more opportunities of success in the next game.

Film Session is also the name of an NFL Network television program exploring the depths of the massive NFL Films library showcasing many of its classic, modern and historical specials and documentaries chronicling the history of the American sport of football in the national football league.
