= 1997–98 Kazakhstan Hockey Championship =

- League: Kazakhstan Hockey Championship
- Sport: Ice Hockey
- Number of teams: 4

Regular season
- Champions: Torpedo Ust-Kamenogorsk
- Runners-up: Bulat Temirtau

Kazakhstan Hockey Championship seasons
- ← 1996–97 1998–99 →

The 1997–98 Kazakhstan Hockey Championship was the sixth season of the Kazakhstan Hockey Championship, the top level of ice hockey in Kazakhstan. Four teams participated in the league, and Torpedo Ust-Kamenogorsk won the championship.

== Standings ==
	GP	W	T	L	GF:GA	Pts
Torpedo Ust-Kamenogorsk	3	3	0	0	29:7	6:0
Bulat Temirtau	3	2	0	1	17:10	4:2
Torpedo Ust-Kamenogorsk-2	3	1	0	2	11:17	2:4
Torpedo Ust-Kamenogorsk Juniors	3	0	0	3	3:26	0:6
