= Alexander Mayer (ice hockey) =

Russian ice hockey player

- Born: 18 February 1986 (age 39); Irkutsk, RSFSR, Soviet Union
- Height: 6 ft 0 in (183 cm)
- Weight: 179 lb (81 kg; 12 st 11 lb)
- Position: Left wing
- Shoots: Left
- VHL team Former teams: Buran Voronezh; Metallurg Novokuznetsk; Kapitan Stupino; Yugra Khanty-Mansiysk; Sputnik Nizhny Tagil; Yertis Pavlodar; Kazzinc-Torpedo
- Playing career: 2002–present

Alexander Borisovich Mayer (Russian: Александр Владимирович Майер), born 18 February 1986) is a Russian ice hockey left winger playing for Buran Voronezh.
