= Viktor Semykin =

Kazakhstani ice hockey coach (born 1948)

- Born: Viktor Ivanovich Semykin; April 10, 1948 (age 77); Ust-Kamenogorsk, Kazakh SSR, USSR
- Occupation: ice hockey coach

Viktor Ivanovich Semykin (Russian: Виктор Иванович Семыкин, born April 4, 1948) is a Kazakhstani professional ice hockey coach. He is honored coach of the Republic of Kazakhstan. Semykin is currently the head coach of Buran Voronezh.

== Coaching career ==
- 1983-1986 Torpedo Ust-Kamenogorsk - head coach
- 1986-1988 Buran Voronezh - head coach
- 1988-1990 Kristall Elektrostal - head coach
- 1990-1991 Lada Togliatti - head coach
- 1991-1996 Zapolyarnik Norilsk - head coach
- 1997-1999 HC Lipetsk - head coach
- 1999-2000 Amur Khabarovsk - head coach
- 2000-2005 Energia Kemerovo - head coach
- 2005-2010 HC Lipetsk - head coach
- 2010-2013 Buran Voronezh - head coach
