= Maksim Belyayev (ice hockey) =

Kazakhstani ice hockey player

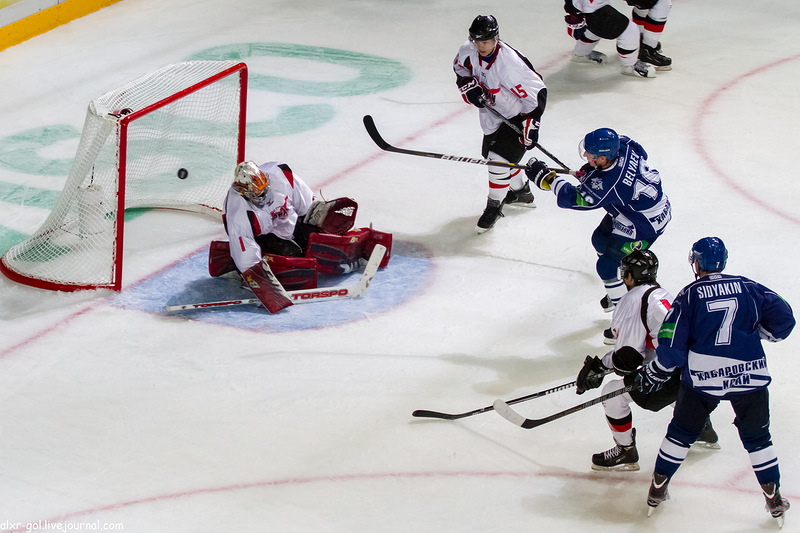
- Maxim Belyayev 2012-08-25 Amur—Japanese national team exhibition game
- Born: 24 August 1979 (age 45); Ust-Kamenogorsk, Kazakhstan
- Height: 6 ft 0 in (183 cm)
- Weight: 183 lb (83 kg; 13 st 1 lb)
- Position: Forward
- Shoots: Left
- VHL team Former teams: Kazzinc-Torpedo; Salavat Yulaev Ufa; Lada Togliatti; Barys Astana; Yugra Khanty-Mansiysk
- National team: Kazakhstan
- Playing career: 1997–present

Maksim Vladimirovich Belyayev (Russian: Максим Владимирович Беляев; born 24 August 1979) is a Kazakhstani professional ice hockey player currently playing for Kazzinc-Torpedo of the Higher Hockey League.

== Career ==
Belyayev began his career with his hometown team Kazzinc-Torpedo. He played for Kazakhmys Karagandy before moving to Salavat Yulaev Ufa of the Russian Superleague. After two years, he moved to Lada Togliatti, during which the RSL was replaced by the Kontinental Hockey League and Lada were entered into the new league. During the inaugural season, he returned to Kazakhstan to play for Barys Astana. In 2009, he returned to Kazzinc-Torpedo and in 2010 he returned to the KHL, joining Yugra Khanty-Mansiysk .

Belyayev is also a member of the Kazakhstan national ice hockey team.

== Career statistics ==
			Regular season					Playoffs
Season	Team	League	GP	G	A	Pts	PIM	GP	G	A	Pts	PIM
1996–97	Torpedo UST-Kamenogorsk-2	Russia3	39	2	2	4	22	—	—	—	—	—
1997–98	Torpedo UST-Kamenogorsk-2	Russia3	41	5	3	8	24	—	—	—	—	—
1998–99	Torpedo UST-Kamenogorsk	Russia2	5	1	0	1	2	—	—	—	—	—
1998–99	Torpedo UST-Kamenogorsk-2	Russia3	35	7	7	14	46	—	—	—	—	—
1999–00	Torpedo UST-Kamenogorsk	Russia3	25	9	7	16	6	—	—	—	—	—
2000–01	Kazzinc-Torpedo	Russia3	38	8	11	19	32	—	—	—	—	—
2001–02	Kazzinc-Torpedo	Russia2	35	7	7	14	12	—	—	—	—	—
2001–02	Torpedo UST-Kamenogorsk-2	Russia3	1	0	1	1	0	—	—	—	—	—
2002–03	Kazzinc-Torpedo	Russia2	5	0	3	3	2	—	—	—	—	—
2002–03	Torpedo UST-Kamenogorsk-2	Russia3	43	34	34	68	30	—	—	—	—	—
2003–04	Kazakhmys Karaganda	Kazakhstan	24	14	23	37	12	—	—	—	—	—
2003–04	Kazakhmys Karaganda	Russia2	54	6	6	12	26	—	—	—	—	—
2004–05	Kazakhmys Karaganda	Kazakhstan	26	17	18	35	28	—	—	—	—	—
2004–05	Kazakhmys Karaganda	Russia2	46	13	10	23	26	—	—	—	—	—
2005–06	Salavat Yulaev Ufa	Russia	24	2	4	6	14	—	—	—	—	—
2005–06	Salavat Yulaev Ufa-2	Russia3	5	0	1	1	0	—	—	—	—	—
2006–07	Salavat Yulaev Ufa	Russia	54	6	15	21	68	8	0	1	1	6
2007–08	HC Lada Togliatti	Russia	29	5	5	10	20	—	—	—	—	—
2007–08	HC Lada Togliatti-2	Russia3	17	5	10	15	24	—	—	—	—	—
2008–09	Barys Astana	KHL	11	0	3	3	0	—	—	—	—	—
2008–09	HC Lada Togliatti	KHL	27	0	5	5	12	4	1	0	1	0
2008–09	HC Lada Togliatti-2	Russia3	2	0	0	0	2	—	—	—	—	—
2009–10	Kazzinc-Torpedo	Russia2	37	11	21	32	64	7	2	0	2	22
2009–10	Torpedo UST-Kamenogorsk-2	Kazakhstan	8	2	2	4	8	—	—	—	—	—
2010–11	Yugra Khanty-Mansiysk	KHL	52	3	3	6	30	6	0	2	2	0
2011–12	Yugra Khanty-Mansiysk	KHL	37	3	4	7	34	4	1	0	1	29
2012–13	Amur Khabarovsk	KHL	15	0	1	1	4	—	—	—	—	—
2012–13	Yugra Khanty-Mansiysk	KHL	26	2	2	4	8	—	—	—	—	—
2013–14	Kazzinc-Torpedo	VHL	49	7	20	27	34	6	0	1	1	8
2014–15	HC Ryazan	VHL	46	16	15	31	26	5	1	0	1	2
2015–16	Saryarka Karagandy	VHL	43	12	8	20	22	16	2	12	14	4
2016–17	Torpedo UST-Kamenogorsk	VHL	47	3	13	16	22	22	2	3	5	18
2017–18	Torpedo UST-Kamenogorsk	VHL	21	2	8	10	14	—	—	—	—	—
2017–18	Yertis Pavlodar	Kazakhstan	21	7	11	18	8	6	1	1	2	2
2018–19	Saryarka Karagandy	VHL	27	1	3	4	12	—	—	—	—	—
KHL totals			168	8	18	26	88	14	2	2	4	29
Russia totals			107	13	24	37	102	—	—	—	—	—
Russia2 totals			182	38	47	85	132	7	2	0	2	22
Russia3 totals			246	70	76	146	186	—	—	—	—	—
VHL totals			233	41	67	108	130	49	5	16	21	32
Kazakhstan totals			79	40	54	94	56	6	1	1	2	2
