= ShKO Oskemen =

- City: Oskemen, Kazakhstan
- League: Kazakhstan Hockey Championship
- Founded: 2009
- Home arena: Boris Alexandrov Sports Palace
- Website: www.hc-torpedo.kz

ShKO Hockey Club (Kazakh: ШҚО хоккей клубы), often referred to as ShKO Oskemen and literally as East Kazakhstan Region (Kazakh: Шығыс Қазақстан облысы), is the farm team of Torpedo Ust-Kamenogorsk. Formerly it known as Kazzinc-Torpedo-2 (2009–2014) and Torpedo Oskemen (2014–2015). They were founded in 2009, and play in the Kazakhstan Hockey Championship, the top level of ice hockey in Kazakhstan.

== Season-by-season record ==
Note: GP = Games played, W = Wins, L = Losses, OTW = Overtime/shootout wins, OTL = Overtime/shootout losses, Pts = Points, GF = Goals for, GA = Goals against

Season	GP	W	L	OTW	OTL	Pts	GF	GA	Finish	Playoffs
2009–10	56	11	40	2	3	40	107	163	7th	Did not qualify
2010–11	54	6	43	2	3	25	96	272	10th	Did not qualify
2011–12	54	3	48	1	2	92	13	344	10th	Did not qualify
2012–13	54	12	36	2	4	44	125	255	9th	Did not qualify

== Head coaches ==
- Vladimir Belyaev 2010–11
- Igor Dorokhin 2011–12
- Maxim Komissarov 2014–present
