= Kazzinc-Torpedo =

Torpedo Ust-Kamenogorsk
- City: Oskemen, Kazakhstan
- League: Kazakhstan Hockey Championship
- Founded: 1955
- Home arena: Boris Alexandrov Sports Palace
- Colours
- General manager: Sergei Nemchinov
- Head coach: Alexei Fetisov
- Captain: Leonid Metalnikov
- Website: hctorpedo.pro

Championships
- Playoff championships: 1992–93, 1993–94, 1994–95, 1995–96, 1996–97, 1997–98, 1999–00, 2000–01, 2001–02, 2002–03, 2003–04, 2004–05, 2006–07

Torpedo Hockey Club (Kazakh: Торпедо хоккей клубы, «Torpedo» hokkeı klýby; Russian: Хоккейный клуб Торпедо), commonly referred to as Torpedo Ust-Kamenogorsk, formerly known as Kazzinc-Torpedo (1999–2015), is a professional ice hockey team based in Oskemen, Kazakhstan. Torpedo has typically been the most dominant developmental club in Kazakhstan and its senior level team plays at the Kazakhstan Hockey Championship. Most Kazakh players who have reached the National Hockey League (NHL) trace their roots to Torpedo. Kazzinc-Torpedo is the most crowned Kazakhstan team, with 13 championship wins.

== History ==
=== 1955–1992: the Soviet era ===
The Torpedo were founded by Nikolai Konyakhin in 1955. Konyakhin was a former ice hockey player and he had experience of playing for a youth team of the Moscow region. Father and son Konaykhin's have initiated the foundation of the amateur team at the Ulba Metallurgical Plant. Ice Hockey was a new kind of sport for the factory guys and they started to train and play on the ice of Ulba River in winter. By that time, the factory workers were playing football and bandy. Both teams were calling Torpedo. The new hockey team was named Torpedo, too.

In 1957, they participated at the Kazakh SSR Hockey Championship in Alma-Ata. Also, it was the first official tournament for Torpedo Ust-Kamenogorsk. They won silver medals at this championship. It was first and last silver medals at the National Championships, because they were unbeaten before 1964. In 1964, Torpedo debuted in the Soviet Hockey Championship's Class B. The team was coached by Olympic medalist and multiple champion of USSR Yuri Baulin. His management led to promotion to Soviet Hockey Championship's Class A2. In 1966–67, they were runners-up and lost only to Avtomobilist Sverdlovsk.

In 1977, Torpedo was relegated to the Soviet Hockey Championship's Class A3. However, three years later they returned to Class A2 Division. That team was coached by Valentin Grigoriev and formed only by its own hockey school graduates. In the early 1980s, the team was headed by local coach Viktor Semykin. The young manager gathered new powerful squad. The team included the most famous local graduate Boris Alexandrov, who returned from CSKA Moscow to his hometown. He became famous all over the world after playing in the Super Series '76 with the team CSKA Moscow and scoring against the New York Rangers, the Montreal Canadiens and the Boston Bruins. In 1986, a conflict between Semykin and the players saw Semykin sacked. Team management assigned Vladimir Goltze as a new head coach. He led the team to the Soviet Hockey Championship's Class A. It was the team's first time at that level. Boris Alexandrov was the best goalscorer at the first round of championships. However, the team was relegated after one season to Class A2 Division. One season later, they returned to the highest division. They stayed at the top division for three seasons until the dissolution of the Soviet Union.

=== The post-Soviet era ===
Logo used as Kazzinc-Torpedo.

After the dissolution of the Soviet Union, the team kept up much of its momentum, despite losing many of its players and coaches to Russian teams. From 1992 to 1996, Torpedo competed at the International Hockey League, which replaced the Soviet Hockey Championship. In 1993, Torpedo joined the newly created Kazakhstan Hockey Championship, where they would play in parallel to their participation in the International Hockey League. In 1992-93 season, they qualified to the play-offs, but lost to SKA Saint Petersburg in the preliminary round. The team had big financial problems and the Ulba Metallurgical Plant was unable to sponsor them. Vladimir Goltze was fired and Boris Alexandrov replaced him. Alexandrov combined his coaching duties with his playing role. He led the team to victory at the Rudi Hiti Summer League in 1994. In the 1994-95 season, Torpedo reached the play-offs, but lost to Krylya Sovetov Moscow in the preliminary round again. In 1996, the International Hockey League was disbanded.

In 1996, Torpedo was admitted into the Russian hockey system. Torpedo joined the Supreme League of the Russian Ice Hockey Championship, the second highest level after the Russian Superleague. In 1998, the Kazakhstan national team competed at the Winter Olympic Games in Nagano. The team was composed entirely of players from Kazzinc–Torpedo and coached by Boris Alexandrov. Journalists called them "The team of one locker room." It was an unexpected result for many people, when they ranked first at the groupe stage after defeating Italy and Slovakia.

== Season-by-season record ==
This is a partial list of the last five seasons completed by Kazzinc-Torpedo. For the full season-by-season history, see List of Kazzinc-Torpedo seasons.

Note: GP = Games played, W = Wins, L = Losses, OTW = Overtime/shootout wins, OTL = Overtime/shootout losses, Pts = Points, GF = Goals for, GA = Goals against

Season	GP	W	OTW	OTL	L	Pts	GF	GA	Finish	Playoffs
2012–13	52	22	6	6	18	84	147	123	14th, Overall	Lost in preliminary round, 3–0 (Toros Neftekamsk)
2013–14	50	20	8	6	16	82	140	146	11th, Overall	Lost in Quarterfinals, 4–2 (Dizel Penza)
2014–15	52	19	5	8	20	75	126	143	15th, Overall	Lost in Quarterfinals, 4–0 (HC Izhstal)
2015–16	49	22	9	3	15	87	130	100	9th, Overall	Lost in Quarterfinals, 4–2 (Saryarka Karagandy)
2016–17	50	30	4	11	5	109	160	100	1st, Overall	Lost in Final, 4–0 (Dynamo Balashikha)

== Achievements ==
=== Domestic ===
Kazakhstan Hockey Championship:

- Winners (13): 1992–93, 1993–94, 1994–95, 1995–96, 1996–97, 1997–98, 1999–00, 2000–01, 2001–02, 2002–03, 2003–04, 2004–05, 2006–07
- Runners-up (2): 2005–06, 2008–09
- 3rd place (1): 2007–08

Kazakhstan Hockey Cup:

- Winners (5): 2002, 2003, 2004, 2007, 2019

=== International ===
Supreme Hockey League:

- Winners (1): 2017 (Regular season winner)

Rudi Hiti Summer League:

- Winners (1): 1994

IIHF Continental Cup:

- 2nd place (1): 2025–26
- 3rd place (1): 2007–08

== Notable alumni ==
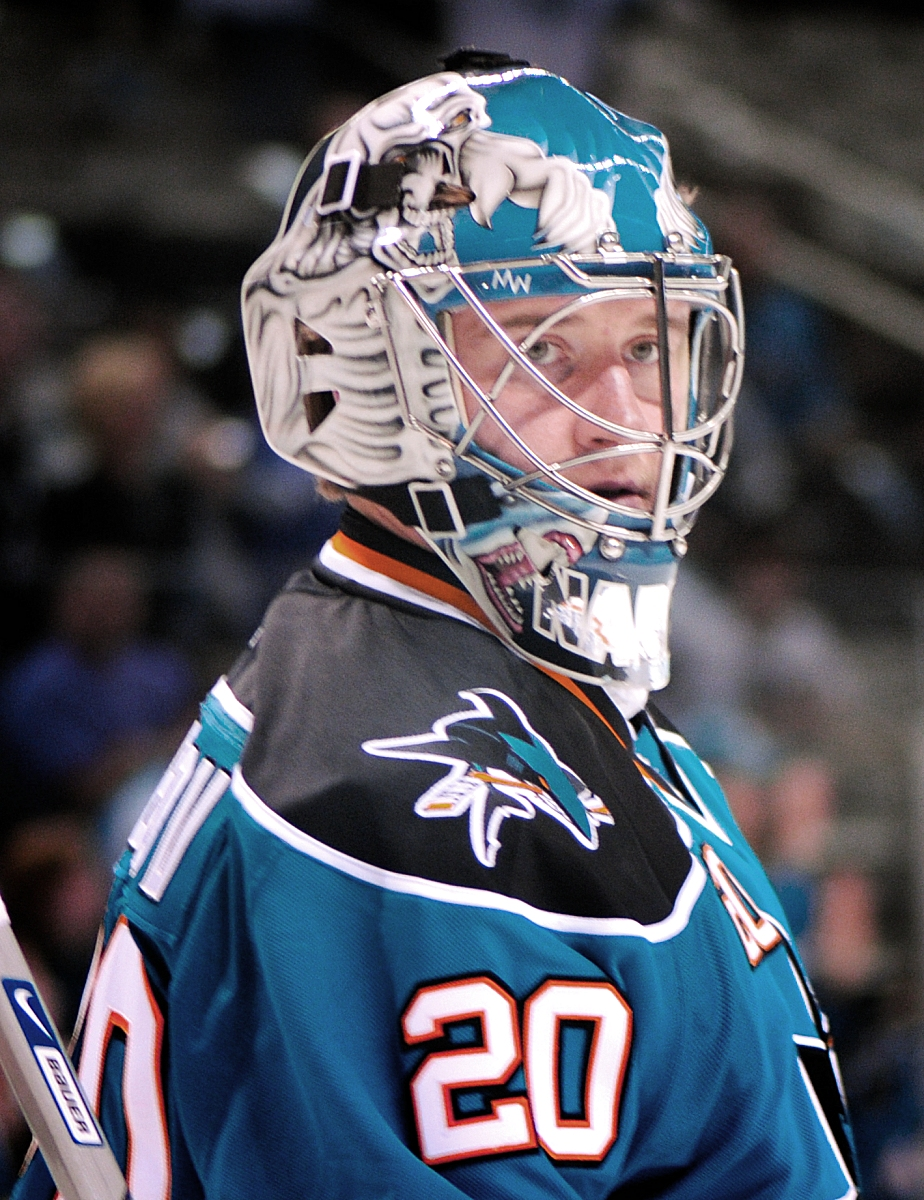
Evgeni Nabokov was awarded the Calder Memorial Trophy as the most best rookie in his first season in the National Hockey League.

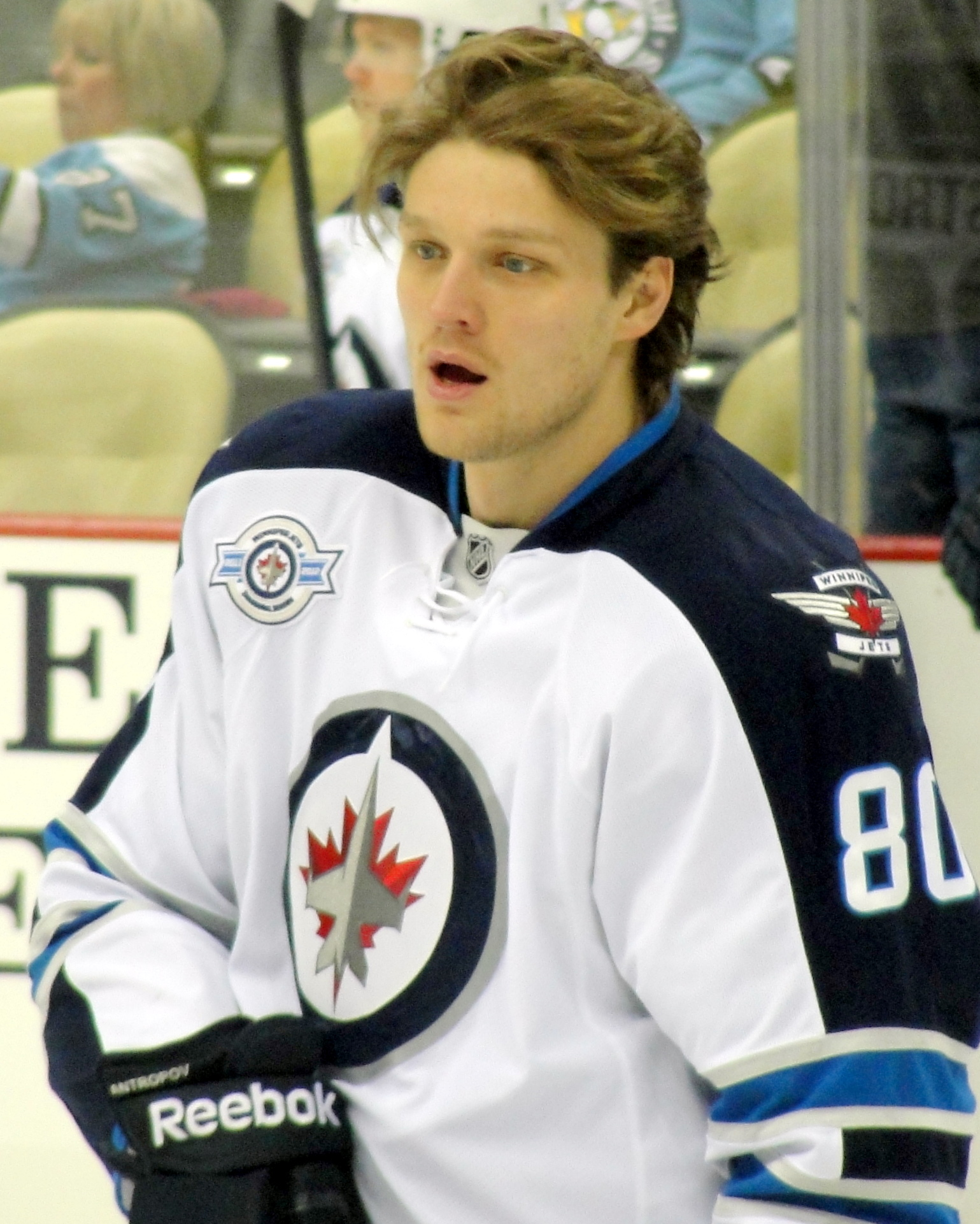
Nik Antropov was selected 10th overall in the first round of 1998 NHL entry draft by Toronto Maple Leafs.

=== List of Torpedo players selected in the NHL Amateur Draft ===
- 1978: Viktor Shkurdyuk (St. Louis Blues) (203rd overall)

=== List of Torpedo players selected in the NHL entry draft ===
- 1992: Andrei Raisky (Winnipeg Jets) (156th overall)
- 1993: Anatoli Filatov (San Jose Sharks) (158th overall)
- 1994: Evgeni Nabokov (San Jose Sharks) (219th overall)
- 1994: Vitali Yeremeyev (New York Rangers) (209th overall)
- 1995: Andrei Samokhvalov (Detroit Red Wings) (208th overall)
- 1996: Konstantin Shafranov (St. Louis Blues) (229th overall)
- 1998: Nik Antropov (Toronto Maple Leafs) (10th overall)
- 1998: Andrei Troschinsky (St. Louis Blues) (170th overall)
- 1999: Dmitri Levinsky (Chicago Blackhawks) (46th overall)
- 1999: Stepan Mokhov (Chicago Blackhawks) (63rd overall)
- 1999: Vadim Tarasov (Montreal Canadiens) (196th overall)
- 1999: Alexei Litvinenko (Phoenix Coyotes) (262nd overall)
- 2000: Max Birbraer (New Jersey Devils) (67th overall)
- 2000: Alexander Lyubimov (Edmonton Oilers) (83rd overall)
- 2000: Dmitri Upper (New York Islanders) (136th overall)
- 2001: Alexander Perezhogin (Montreal Canadiens) (25th overall)
- 2001: Dimitri Pätzold (San Jose Sharks) (107th overall)
- 2003: Konstantin Pushkaryov (Los Angeles Kings) (44th overall)
- 2003: Dmitri Pestunov (Phoenix Coyotes) (80th overall)
- 2004: Viktor Alexandrov (St. Louis Blues) (83rd overall)
- 2004: Anton Khudobin (Minnesota Wild) (206th overall)

Note: Only counts if the players played for Torpedo before they were selected in the NHL Entry Draft. Some players played only for the Torpedo Junior Team.

=== List of undrafted NHL alumni ===
- Vitali Kolesnik played for the Colorado Avalanche in the 2005–06 NHL season.

== Leaders ==
=== Team captains ===
- Igor Kuznetsov 1979–89
- Artyom Argokov 2009–10
- Alexei Koledayev 2011–12
- Vladislav Kolesnikov 2012–13
- Maxim Belyayev 2013–14
- Leonid Metalnikov 2014–15
- Yevgeni Fadeyev 2015–16
- Maxim Belyayev 2016–17
- Dmitri Gromov 2019–20
- Alexander Ugolnikov 2020–21

=== Head coaches ===
- Valeryan Lyutikov 1959–60
- Viktor Nikiforov 1960–62
- Arkadi Aleshkovich 1962–63
- Yuri Tarkhov 1963–64
- Alexander Cherepanov 1964
- Yuri Baulin 1964–69
- Yuri Subbotin 1969–71
- Vladimir Kiselev 1971–73
- Vasili Basters 1973–74
- Mark Sudat 1974–76
- Yuri Saal 1974–76
- Anatoli Yegorov 1977–78
- Vladimir Polshakov 1977–78
- Valentin Grigoriev 1978–80
- Viktor Shekochikhin 1983–86
- Viktor Semykin 1983–86
- Vladimir Goltze 1986–94
- Vladimir Koptsov 1994–95
- Boris Alexandrov 1995–02
- Nikolai Myshagin 2002–05
- Vladimir Belyaev 2005–06
- Yerlan Sagymbayev 2006–08
- Vladimir Belyayev 2008–10
- Oleg Bolyakin 2010–12
- Sergei Mogilnikov 2012
- Igor Dorokhin 2012–13
- Vladimir Plyuschev 2013–14
- Andrei Psaryov 2014
- Nikolai Myshagin 2014–15
- Alexei Fetisov 2015–present
