= Dizel Penza =

- City: Penza, Russia
- League: VHL 2010-present: Vysshaya Liga 1992-1996, 1998-2002, 2003-2010; Pervaya Liga 2002-2003; RSL 1996-1998; Soviet League Class A2 1963-1972, 1974-1988, 1991-1992; Soviet League Class A3 1972-1974, 1988-1991; Soviet League Class B 1955-1963
- Founded: 1955
- Home arena: Dizel Arena
- Colours
- Head coach: Alexey Vaulin
- Affiliate: Dizelist (MHL-B)
- Website: http://hcdizel.ru/

Dizel Penza is an ice hockey team in Penza, Russia. They play in the VHL, the second level of Russian ice hockey. The club used to be affiliated with Neftekhimik Nizhnekamsk of the KHL.

== History ==
The club was founded as Burevestnik Penza in 1955. In 1963, they were renamed Dizelist Penza, and took on their current Dizel Penza name in 2002.

== Notable alumni ==
- Vladislav Bulin
- Airat Kadeikin
- Yan Kaminsky
- Sergei Svetlov
- Dmitri Vanyasov
- Sergei Yashin
