= 1992–93 IHL (Russia) season =

1992–93 IHL season
- League: International Hockey League
- Sport: Ice hockey
- Number of teams: 24

First round
- First Rnd champions: HC Lada Togliatti

Second round
- Second Rnd champions: HC Lada Togliatti

Playoffs

Finals
- Champions: HC Dynamo Moscow
- Runners-up: HC Lada Togliatti

IHL seasons
- ← 1991–92 1993–94 →

The 1992–93 International Hockey League season was the first season of the International Hockey League, the top level of ice hockey in Russia. 24 teams participated in the league, and Dynamo Moscow won the championship by defeating Lada Togliatti in the final.

== First round ==
=== Group 1 ===
	Club	GP	W	T	L	GF	GA	Pts
1.	HK Dynamo Moscow	20	12	5	3	67	31	29
2.	Krylya Sovetov Moscow	20	11	3	6	53	38	25
3.	HK Spartak Moscow	20	9	4	7	54	46	22
4.	Khimik Voskresensk	20	9	4	7	54	64	22
5.	Torpedo Yaroslavl	20	6	2	13	42	60	14
6.	HK CSKA Moscow	20	2	4	14	37	68	8

=== Group 2 ===
	Club	GP	W	T	L	GF	GA	Pts
1.	HK Sokol Kiev	20	13	1	6	77	54	27
2.	HK Pārdaugava Riga	20	12	2	6	70	54	26
3.	Metallurg Cherepovets	20	10	2	8	57	56	22
4.	SKA St. Petersburg	20	9	2	9	48	48	20
5.	Kristall Saratov	20	5	3	12	42	65	13
6.	Dinamo Minsk	20	4	4	12	38	55	12

=== Group 3 ===
	Club	GP	W	T	L	GF	GA	Pts
1.	HK Lada Togliatti	20	16	2	2	79	34	34
2.	HK Metallurg Magnitogorsk	20	12	4	4	79	42	28
3.	Salavat Yulaev Ufa	20	11	3	6	64	45	25
4.	Torpedo Nizhny Novgorod	20	5	3	12	38	53	13
5.	Molot-Prikamie Perm	20	5	1	14	46	90	11
6.	Itil Kazan	20	3	3	14	39	81	9

=== Group 4 ===
	Club	GP	W	T	L	GF	GA	Pts
1.	HK Traktor Chelyabinsk	20	15	1	4	81	46	31
2.	HK Avangard Omsk	20	10	5	5	83	61	25
3.	Avtomobilist Yekaterinburg	20	10	3	7	68	62	23
4.	Torpedo Ust-Kamenogorsk	20	9	2	9	83	67	20
5.	Metallurg Novokuznetsk	20	6	2	12	48	76	14
6.	Avtomobilist Karaganda	20	2	3	15	41	92	7

== Second round ==
=== Western Conference ===
	Club	GP	W	T	L	GF	GA	Pts
1.	HK Dynamo Moscow	42	26	9	7	141	83	61
2.	Krylya Sovetov Moscow	42	25	4	13	127	93	54
3.	HK Spartak Moscow	42	22	6	14	133	109	50
4.	SKA St. Petersburg	42	22	5	15	125	115	49
5.	Torpedo Yaroslavl	42	20	6	16	126	106	46
6.	HK Pārdaugava Riga	42	19	8	15	142	125	46
7	HK Sokol Kiev	42	18	7	17	141	119	43
8.	Khimik Voskresensk	42	18	7	17	117	125	43
9.	Metallurg Cherepovets	42	19	3	20	111	123	41
10.	Dinamo Minsk	42	10	8	24	90	124	28
11.	Kristall Saratov	42	8	6	28	92	179	22
12.	HK CSKA Moscow	42	7	7	28	92	136	21

=== Eastern Conference ===
	Club	GP	W	T	L	GF	GA	Pts
1.	HK Lada Togliatti	42	31	3	8	165	87	65
2.	HK Traktor Chelyabinsk	42	28	5	9	175	112	61
3.	HK Avangard Omsk	42	21	10	11	160	130	52
4.	Salavat Yulaev Ufa	42	22	6	14	147	105	50
5.	Torpedo Ust-Kamenogorsk	42	23	2	17	177	146	48
6.	HK Metallurg Magnitogorsk	42	20	7	15	147	120	47
7.	Avtomobilist Yekaterinburg	42	18	9	15	136	130	45
8.	Torpedo Nizhny Novgorod	42	13	8	21	96	115	34
9.	Itil Kazan	42	14	4	22	126	156	32
10.	Molot-Prikamie Perm	42	13	2	27	110	178	28
11.	Metallurg Novokuznetsk	42	10	5	27	95	156	25
12.	Avtomobilist Karaganda	42	6	5	31	96	195	17

== Playoffs ==
First round
W1	HK Dynamo Moscow	2
O8	Torpedo Nizhny Novgorod	0
W5	Torpedo Yaroslavl	2
O4	Salavat Yulaev Ufa	0
W7	HK Sokol Kiev	1
O2	HK Traktor Chelyabinsk	2
W3	HK Spartak Moscow	1
O6	HK Metallurg Magnitogorsk	2
W2	Krylya Sovetov Moscow	2
O7	Avtomobilist Yekaterinburg	1
W6	HK Pārdaugava Riga	0
O3	HK Avangard Omsk	2
W4	SKA St. Petersburg	2
O5	Torpedo Ust-Kamenogorsk	1
W8	Khimik Voskresensk	0
O1	HK Lada Togliatti	2

Quarterfinals
W1	HK Dynamo Moscow	2
W5	Torpedo Yaroslavl	0
O2	HK Traktor Chelyabinsk	2
O6	HK Metallurg Magnitogorsk	0
W2	Krylya Sovetov Moscow	2
O3	HK Avangard Omsk	0
W4	SKA St. Petersburg	1
O1	HK Lada Togliatti	2

Semifinals
W1	HK Dynamo Moscow	2
O2	HK Traktor Chelyabinsk	1
W2	Krylya Sovetov Moscow	0
O1	HK Lada Togliatti	2

Finals
W1	HK Dynamo Moscow	3
O1	HK Lada Togliatti	0
