= 1993–94 IHL (Russia) season =

1993–94 IHL season
- League: International Hockey League
- Sport: Ice hockey
- Number of teams: 24

Regular season
- Season champions: HC Lada Togliatti

Playoffs

Finals
- Champions: HC Lada Togliatti
- Runners-up: HC Dynamo Moscow

IHL seasons
- ← 1992–93 1994–95 →

The 1993–94 International Hockey League season was the second season of the International Hockey League, the top level of ice hockey in Russia. 24 teams participated in the league, and HK Lada Togliatti became the first ever team from outside the capital to win the championship by defeating HK Dynamo Moscow in the final.

== Regular season ==
	Club	GP	W	T	L	GF	GA	Pts
1.	HK Lada Togliatti	46	33	7	6	169	82	73
2.	HK Dynamo Moscow	46	30	8	8	197	126	68
3.	HK Traktor Chelyabinsk	46	32	3	11	187	120	67
4.	Salavat Yulaev Ufa	46	28	6	12	171	104	62
5.	HK Metallurg Magnitogorsk	46	28	5	13	180	144	61
6.	Torpedo Yaroslavl	46	28	3	15	181	96	59
7.	Itil Kazan	46	25	4	17	138	118	54
8.	HK Spartak Moscow	46	24	5	17	163	142	53
9.	Torpedo Ust-Kamenogorsk	46	25	1	20	174	153	51
10.	Krylya Sovetov Moscow	46	22	5	19	140	110	49
11.	Khimik Voskresensk	46	20	9	17	130	122	49
12.	HK Pārdaugava Riga	46	21	6	19	153	155	48
13.	SKA St. Petersburg	46	20	8	18	125	96	48
14.	HK CSKA Moscow	46	21	5	20	111	121	47
15.	Torpedo Nizhny Novgorod	46	17	11	18	116	125	45
16.	HK Avangard Omsk	46	21	3	22	140	133	45
17.	HK Sokol Kiev	46	18	8	20	120	143	44
18.	Metallurg Cherepovets	46	17	3	26	124	157	37
19.	Tivali Minsk	46	14	5	27	118	152	33
20.	Metallurg Novokuznetsk	46	10	6	30	106	158	26
21.	Avtomobilist Yekaterinburg	46	9	6	31	111	205	24
22.	Stroitel Karaganda	46	10	2	34	109	205	22
23.	Molot-Prikamie Perm	46	8	4	34	95	181	20
24.	Kristall Saratov	46	7	3	36	103	233	17

== Playoffs ==
First round
1	HK Lada Togliatti	2
18	Metallurg Cherepovets	0
8	HK Spartak Moscow	2
10	Krylya Sovetov Moscow	1
4	Salavat Yulaev Ufa	2
14	HK CSKA Moscow	1
5	HK Metallurg Magnitogorsk	0
13	SKA St. Petersburg	2
3	HK Traktor Chelyabinsk	2
15	Torpedo Nizhny Novgorod	0
6	Torpedo Yaroslavl	2
12	HK Pārdaugava Riga	0
7	Itil Kazan	2
11	Khimik Voskresensk	0
2	HK Dynamo Moscow	2
15	HK Avangard Omsk	1

Quarterfinals
1	HK Lada Togliatti	2
8	HK Spartak Moscow	1
4	Salavat Yulaev Ufa	0
13	SKA St. Petersburg	2
3	Traktor Chelyabinsk	2
6	Torpedo Yaroslavl	0
7	Itil Kazan	0
2	Dynamo Moscow	2

Semifinals
1	HK Lada Togliatti	2
13	SKA St. Petersburg	0
3	HK Traktor Chelyabinsk	0
2	HK Dynamo Moscow	2

Final
1	HK Lada Togliatti	3
2	HK Dynamo Moscow	2
