= Avtomobilist Karagandy =

- City: Karaganda, Kazakhstan
- League: International Hockey League; 1992–1996; Kazakhstan Championship; 1992–2000
- Founded: 1966
- Operated: 2000
- Home arena: Akzholtay Sports Palace
- Colors

Franchise history
- 1966–1980: Stroitel Karaganda
- 1980–1993: Avtomobilist Karaganda
- 1993–1995: Stroitel Karagandy
- 1995–1996: Bulat Karagandy
- 1998–2000: Avtomobilist Karagandy

Avtomobilist Karaganda (Kazakh: Автомобилист Қарағанды) was an ice hockey team in Karaganda, Kazakhstan. They were active from 1966 to 1996 and from 1998 to 2000.

== History ==
The club was founded in 1966 as Stroitel Karaganda (Строитель Караганда) and played at first in the Vtoraya Liga, the third level of Soviet ice hockey. They won the Vtoraya Liga as Avtomobilist Karaganda in 1980, and were promoted to the Pervaya Liga. From 1992 to 1996, Karaganda participated in the International Hockey League, which featured teams from the Commonwealth of Independent States. In 1993, they took on their old name of Stroitel again, and dissolved due to financial difficulties in 1996. In 1998, the team was revived as Avtomobilist, but they were dissolved after only one season.

== Notable players ==
- Vladimir Antipin
- Oleg Bolyakin
- Sergei Mogilnikov
- Yerlan Sagymbayev

== Notable Coaches ==
- Yuri Baulin
