= Coach (ice hockey) =

Person responsible for directing an ice hockey team

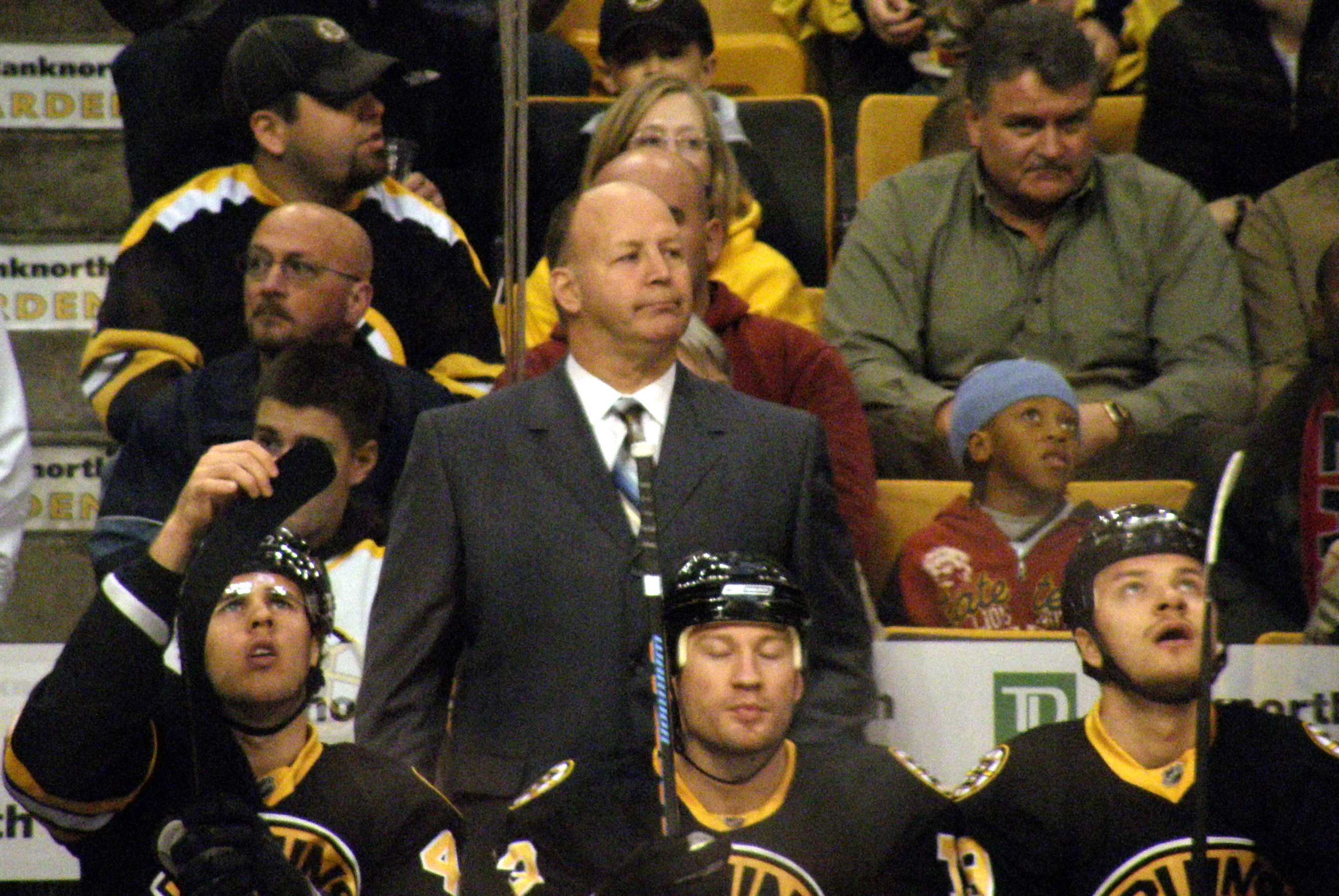
Coach Claude Julien (standing) studies the action during a game.

The coach in ice hockey is the person responsible for directing the team during games and practices, prepares strategy and decides which players will participate in games.

== Role ==
As each game is given great importance, a coach will analyse past games and prepare for future games. Coaches are important in determining the style of hockey the team plays. While winning is a primary goal at the professional level, at the other extreme of minor hockey, teaching is given greater importance.

The specific responsibilities of a coach vary according to the level at which they are coaching. For example, unique to coaching at the professional level, a coach, especially a head coach, needs to have skills in dealing with the media. In sport, the role of an expert coach entails more than teaching. Position or skill coaches such as for goaltenders or skating development. Support coaches include Video coaches and Strength and conditioning coach. Professional coaching staffs will include multiple Assistant coaches and sometimes an Associate coach. Associate coaches are a step above a normal assistant coach and one step below a head coach.

== Youth hockey ==
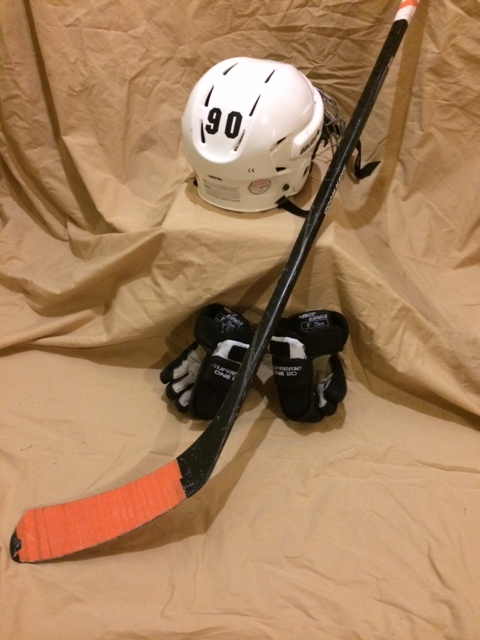
Youth hockey

The role of a youth ice hockey coach is a combination of teacher, motivator, organizer, listener, and disciplinarian. In addition, there are many other responsibilities that a youth hockey coach will fulfill. Some responsibilities include: facilitator, demonstrator, evaluator, supporter, and planner.

In the case of coaching of youth hockey, while strategy and tactic skills are still required, there would be the added responsibility of teaching participants the fundamental skills and rules of the game; providing a fun and safe environment; developing character; teaching physical fitness; and having the ability to communicate in a positive manner.

Youth coaches influence the degree of enjoyment experienced by youth and their desire to continue participating in sport. This influence occurs through the coaches’ goals, values, attitudes, and behaviors.

== Coaching preparation ==
Prior to coaching on the ice in the United States, coaches must complete a certification course and age specific modules sanctioned by USA Hockey and then register with USA Hockey. Coaching clinics for certification are offered at various locations across the country, broken down by districts. Formal coaching education programs are not the only way coaches are developed. Other learning opportunities, such as playing experience, mentoring, and discussions with other coaches play a significant role.

== Game plan ==
A coach should focus their attention on individual skill development first. Individual skill development should be mastered prior to focusing on competition. For players to become successful in a team situation, they must develop their skating, stick handling, passing, and shooting skills. Individual skill development is the foundation for every player and of primary importance before advancing in competitive situations.

== See also ==
- Coach (sport)
- Ice hockey
- USA Hockey
