= Kazakhstan men's national ice hockey team =

Men's national ice hockey team representing Kazakhstan

Kazakhstan
- Association: Kazakhstan Ice Hockey Federation
- General manager: Oleg Bolyakin
- Head coach: Talgat Zhailauov
- Assistants: Alexander Kudryavtsev; Konstantin Pushkaryov
- Captain: Roman Starchenko
- Most games: Roman Starchenko (212)
- Top scorer: Roman Starchenko (114)
- Most points: Roman Starchenko (204)
- Team colors
- IIHF code: KAZ
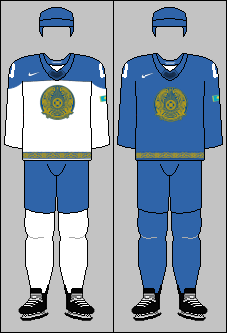

Ranking
- Current IIHF: 14 (3 June 2026)
- Highest IIHF: 11 (2006)
- Lowest IIHF: 21 (2003)

First international
- Kazakhstan 5–1 Ukraine (Saint Petersburg, Russia; 14 April 1992)

Biggest win
- Kazakhstan 52–1 Thailand (Changchun, China; 29 January 2007)

Biggest defeat
- United States 10–0 Kazakhstan (Cologne, Germany; 15 May 2010)

Olympics
- Appearances: 2 (first in 1998)

IIHF World Championships
- Appearances: 33 (first in 1993)
- Best result: 10th (2021)

Asian Winter Games
- Appearances: 7 (first in 1996)
- Best result: Gold (1996, 1999, 2011, 2017, 2025)

International record (W–L–T)
- 229–153–14

Medal record

Asian Winter Games
Gold medal – first place	1996 Harbin	Team
Gold medal – first place	1999 Kangwon	Team
Gold medal – first place	2011 Astana-Almaty	Team
Gold medal – first place	2017 Sapporo	Team
Gold medal – first place	2025 Harbin	Team
Silver medal – second place	2003 Aomori	Team
Silver medal – second place	2007 Changchun	Team

The Kazakhstan Men's National Ice Hockey Team is controlled by Kazakhstan Ice Hockey Federation. Kazakhstan is ranked 13th in the world as of 2025. They have competed at the Winter Olympics twice, in 1998 and 2006. The national team joined the IIHF in 1992 and first played internationally at the 1993 Men's World Ice Hockey Championships. The team has frequently played at the elite division of the World Championship, often moving between there and the Division I level.

== History ==
Kazakhstan joined the IIHF in 1992, applying as a separate member with six other former Soviet republics. They played their first IIHF tournament at the 1993 World Championship; as a new member they had to play in Group C, the lowest level. They reached the elite division for the first time in 1998, and have played at the elite level thirteen times (1998, 2004, 2005, 2006, 2010, 2012, 2014, 2016, 2021, 2022, 2023, 2024 and 2025).

The national team has appeared at the Winter Olympics twice, in 1998 and 2006. In their debut in 1998, Kazakhstan was able to win their preliminary group, surprising many, and would finish the tournament in 8th place. They returned for the 2006 Winter Olympics, and finished ninth overall.

The team is the most successful team at the Asian Games, winning it five times, and they are the current highest ranked Asian team. In November 2024, Kazakhstan also won the inaugural IIHF Asia Championship. Since 2022, the team has participated in the Channel One Cup, alongside Russia and Belarus.

== Tournament record ==
=== Olympic Games ===
- 1998 – Finished in 8th place
- 2006 – Finished in 9th place

=== World Championships ===
Year	City	Country	Result
1954 – 1991	As part of Soviet Union / Kazakh SSR		
1992	did not compete		
1993	Ljubljana	Slovenia	3rd place in Group C (23rd)
1994	Poprad / Spišská Nová Ves	Slovakia	4th place in Group C1 (24th)
1995	Sofia	Bulgaria	2nd place in Group C1 (22nd)
1996	Jesenice / Kranj	Slovenia	▲1st place in Group C (21st)
1997	Katowice / Sosnowiec	Poland	▲2nd place in Group B (14th)
1998	Zürich / Basel	Switzerland	▼16th place
1999	Odense / Rodovre	Denmark	3rd place in Group B (19th)
2000	Katowice / Kraków	Poland	2nd place in Group B (18th)
2001	Ljubljana	Slovenia	3rd place in Division IB (21st)
2002	Eindhoven	Netherlands	3rd place in Division IA (21st)
2003	Budapest	Hungary	▲1st place in Division I Group A (17th)
2004	Prague / Ostrava	Czech Republic	13th place
2005	Vienna / Innsbruck	Austria	12th place
2006	Riga	Latvia	▼15th place
2007	Qiqihar	China	3rd place in Division IA (21st)
2008	Innsbruck	Austria	2nd place in Division IA (20th)
2009	Vilnius	Lithuania	▲1st place in Division IA (17th)
2010	Cologne / Mannheim / Gelsenkirchen	Germany	▼16th place
2011	Kyiv	Ukraine	▲1st place in Division IB (17th)
2012	Helsinki / Stockholm	Finland / Sweden	▼16th place
2013	Budapest	Hungary	▲1st place in Division IA (17th)
2014	Minsk	Belarus	▼16th place
2015	Kraków	Poland	▲1st place in Division IA (17th)
2016	Moscow / Saint Petersburg	Russia	▼16th place
2017	Kyiv	Ukraine	3rd place in Division IA (19th)
2018	Budapest	Hungary	3rd place in Division IA (19th)
2019	Astana	Kazakhstan	▲1st place in Division IA (17th)
~~2020~~	Zürich / Lausanne	Switzerland	Cancelled due to the COVID-19 pandemic
2021	Riga	Latvia	10th place
2022	Tampere / Helsinki	Finland	14th place
2023	Tampere / Riga	Finland / Latvia	11th place
2024	Prague / Ostrava	Czech Republic	12th place
2025	Stockholm / Herning	Sweden / Denmark	▼15th place
2026	Sosnowiec	Poland	▲1st place in Division IA (17th)
2027	Düsseldorf / Mannheim	Germany	

=== Asian Winter Games ===
Year	Host	Result	M	W	D	L	GF	GA	GD
1986	Japan	-	-	-	-	-	-	-	-
1990	Japan	-	-	-	-	-	-	-	-
1996	South Korea	1st	3	3	0	0	33	2	+31
1999	China	1st	4	3	1	0	65	4	+61
2003	Japan	2nd	4	3	0	1	49	10	+39
2007	China	2nd	5	4	0	1	117	6	+111
2011	Kazakhstan	1st	4	4	0	0	62	3	+59
2017	Japan	1st	3	3	0	0	19	0	+19
2025	China	1st	8	8	0	0	73	4	+69
Total	-	7/9	31	28	1	2	419	29	+390

=== Asia Championship ===
- 2025 – (gold) 1st place
- 2026 – (gold) 1st place
- 2027 – (gold) 1st place

=== Winter Universiade ===
- 1993 – (silver) 2nd place
- 1995 – (gold) 1st place
- 2007 – (bronze) 3rd place
- 2009 – 4th place
- 2011 – 4th place
- 2013 – (silver) 2nd place
- 2015 – (silver) 2nd place
- 2017 – (silver) 2nd place
- 2019 – 4th place
- 2023 – (bronze) 3rd place
- 2025 – 6th place

=== Channel One Cup ===
- 2022 – (bronze) 3rd place
- 2023 – (bronze) 3rd place
- 2024 – 4th place
- 2025 – (bronze) 3rd place

== Team ==
=== Current roster ===
Roster for the 2025 IIHF World Championship.

Head coach: Oleg Bolyakin

No.	Pos.	Name	Height	Weight	Birthdate	Team
1	G	Jelal-ad-Din Amirbekov	1.96 m (6 ft 5 in)	79 kg (174 lb)	24 September 2002 (age 24)	(Russia) Metallurg Magnitogorsk
7	D	Leonid Metalnikov	1.82 m (6 ft 0 in)	85 kg (187 lb)	25 April 1990 (age 36)	(Russia) Admiral Vladivostok
10	F	Nikita Mikhailis – A	1.75 m (5 ft 9 in)	75 kg (165 lb)	18 June 1995 (age 31)	(Russia) Metallurg Magnitogorsk
13	F	Dinmukhamed Kaiyrzhan	1.84 m (6 ft 0 in)	84 kg (185 lb)	27 June 2003 (age 23)	(Kazakhstan) Barys Astana
17	F	Alikhan Omirbekov	1.75 m (5 ft 9 in)	73 kg (161 lb)	14 June 2001 (age 25)	(Kazakhstan) Barys Astana
18	F	Vladimir Volkov	1.77 m (5 ft 10 in)	75 kg (165 lb)	3 October 1996 (age 30)	(Kazakhstan) Arlan Kokshetau
20	G	Maxim Pavlenko	1.95 m (6 ft 5 in)	82 kg (181 lb)	4 June 2002 (age 24)	(United States) Wheeling Nailers
22	F	Kirill Panyukov	1.87 m (6 ft 2 in)	92 kg (203 lb)	22 May 1997 (age 29)	(Kazakhstan) Barys Astana
23	F	Maxim Mukhametov	1.82 m (6 ft 0 in)	80 kg (180 lb)	30 April 1999 (age 27)	(Kazakhstan) Barys Astana
24	D	Dmitri Breus	1.85 m (6 ft 1 in)	88 kg (194 lb)	22 February 2004 (age 22)	(Russia) Torpedo Nizhny Novgorod
27	F	Artyom Likhotnikov	1.89 m (6 ft 2 in)	100 kg (220 lb)	11 May 1994 (age 32)	(Uzbekistan) Humo Tashkent
28	D	Valeri Orekhov	1.86 m (6 ft 1 in)	90 kg (200 lb)	17 July 1999 (age 27)	(Russia) Metallurg Magnitogorsk
31	D	Artyom Korolyov	1.85 m (6 ft 1 in)	74 kg (163 lb)	20 September 2001 (age 25)	(Kazakhstan) Nomad Astana
32	G	Sergei Kudryavtsev	1.85 m (6 ft 1 in)	86 kg (190 lb)	5 April 1995 (age 31)	(Kazakhstan) Arlan Kokshetau
33	D	Eduard Mikhailov	1.83 m (6 ft 0 in)	82 kg (181 lb)	20 October 1996 (age 30)	(Kazakhstan) Arlan Kokshetau
34	F	Vyacheslav Kolesnikov	1.85 m (6 ft 1 in)	85 kg (187 lb)	1 August 2000 (age 26)	(Kazakhstan) Nomad Astana
48	F	Roman Starchenko – C	1.79 m (5 ft 10 in)	88 kg (194 lb)	12 May 1986 (age 40)	(Kazakhstan) Barys Astana
58	D	Tamirlan Gaitamirov	1.93 m (6 ft 4 in)	93 kg (205 lb)	23 August 2000 (age 26)	(Kazakhstan) Barys Astana
64	F	Arkadiy Shestakov	1.82 m (6 ft 0 in)	83 kg (183 lb)	24 March 1995 (age 31)	(Russia) Admiral Vladivostok
71	D	Samat Daniyar	1.83 m (6 ft 0 in)	73 kg (161 lb)	24 January 1999 (age 27)	(Kazakhstan) Barys Astana
81	F	Batyrlan Muratov	1.85 m (6 ft 1 in)	79 kg (174 lb)	1 February 1999 (age 27)	(Kazakhstan) Barys Astana
84	F	Kirill Savitsky	1.83 m (6 ft 0 in)	87 kg (192 lb)	9 March 1995 (age 31)	(Kazakhstan) Barys Astana
87	D	Adil Beketayev	1.93 m (6 ft 4 in)	93 kg (205 lb)	23 April 1998 (age 28)	(Kazakhstan) Barys Astana
88	F	Yevgeni Rymarev	1.75 m (5 ft 9 in)	78 kg (172 lb)	9 September 1988 (age 38)	(Russia) HC Chelny
96	F	Alikhan Asetov – A	1.96 m (6 ft 5 in)	91 kg (201 lb)	26 August 1996 (age 30)	(Kazakhstan) Barys Astana

=== List of head coaches ===
- Vladimir Goltze 1993–94
- Vladimir Koptsov 1994–95
- Boris Alexandrov 1996–02
- Nikolay Myshagin 2003–06
- Anatoli Kartayev 2007
- Yerlan Sagymbayev 2007–09
- Andrei Shayanov 2009–10
- Andrei Khomutov 2010–11
- Andrei Shayanov 2011–12
- Vladimir Krikunov 2012–13
- Ari-Pekka Selin 2013–14
- Andrei Nazarov 2014–2016
- Eduard Zankovets 2016–2017
- Galym Mambetaliyev 2017–2018
- Andrei Skabelka 2018–2020
- Yuri Mikhailis 2020–

== Head-to-head record ==
Record correct as of 20 May 2025.
Teams named in italics are no longer active.

Team	GP	W	T	L	GF	GA
Australia	2	2	0	0	36	3
Austria	13	8	1	4	41	35
Belarus	23	4	1	18	48	88
Bulgaria	2	2	0	0	39	1
Canada	5	0	0	5	7	27
China	14	14	0	0	153	9
Chinese Taipei	2	2	0	0	52	0
Croatia	4	4	0	0	42	4
Czech Republic	6	0	0	6	5	32
Denmark	10	4	0	6	24	38
Estonia	9	8	0	1	48	14
Finland	5	1	0	4	8	21
France	19	8	1	10	51	54
Germany	12	5	0	7	27	40
Great Britain	11	7	1	3	35	23
Hong Kong	1	1	0	0	24	0
Hungary	15	13	0	2	70	25
Italy	25	17	1	7	71	47
Japan	23	17	3	3	101	52
Latvia	15	5	0	10	31	54
Lithuania	5	5	0	0	41	6
Mongolia	2	2	0	0	65	1
Netherlands	8	8	0	0	45	19
Norway	8	4	1	3	21	21
Poland	22	18	1	3	82	45
Romania	6	4	0	2	30	11
Russia	10	0	0	10	19	59
Serbia	1	1	0	0	11	2
Slovakia	13	1	1	11	24	59
Slovenia	20	13	0	7	67	48
South Africa	1	1	0	0	32	0
South Korea	27	20	0	7	139	54
Spain	2	2	0	0	31	0
Sweden	3	0	0	3	6	17
Switzerland	9	3	0	6	18	31
Thailand	2	2	0	0	64	1
United Arab Emirates	1	1	0	0	38	0
Ukraine	22	13	3	6	75	50
United States	8	0	0	8	8	43
Total	385	220	14	151	1 728	1 034

== See also ==
- Kazakhstan women's national ice hockey team
- Ice hockey in Kazakhstan
- Kazakhstan Ice Hockey Championship
- Beijing International Ice Hockey League
- Asia League Ice Hockey
- Supreme Hockey League
- Kontinental Hockey League
- Supreme Hockey League
