= International Hockey League (1992–1996) =

1990's post-USSR ice hockey league

- Formerly: Soviet Championship League
- Sport: Ice hockey
- Founded: 1992
- Folded: 1996
- Replaced by: Russian Superleague

The International Hockey League (MHL) (Russian: Межнациональная хоккейная лига (МХЛ), romanized: Mezhnatsional'naya khokkeynaya liga) lasted from 1992 to 1996. It replaced the Soviet Union's Championship league. The last season was in 1995–96, as the league was replaced by the Russian Superleague the following season.

Unlike the Soviet championship, which was awarded to the best team through the regular season, the MHL introduced a playoff system. There were two trophies in the league: one, the MHL Cup, was awarded to the winner of the playoffs, the other, the MHL Championship, to the winner of the regular season.

The first season of the league sent its champion, HC Dynamo Moscow, to a championship series against HC CSK VVS Samara, the winner of the second-tier Championship of Russia. Dynamo won all three games and were proclaimed Absolute Champions of Russia, which earned them qualification to the IIHF European Cup.

== Champions ==
Season	Champion	Second place	Third place	Winners of the Cup
1992–93	Dynamo Moscow	Lada Togliatti	Traktor Chelyabinsk	Dynamo Moscow
1993–94	Lada Togliatti	Dynamo Moscow	Traktor Chelyabinsk, SKA St. Petersburg	Lada Togliatti
1994–95	Dynamo Moscow	Lada Togliatti	Metallurg Magnitogorsk, Salavat Yulaev Ufa	Dynamo Moscow
1995–96	Lada Togliatti	Dynamo Moscow	Salavat Yulaev Ufa, Avangard Omsk	Dynamo Moscow

== See also ==
- Russian Elite Hockey Scoring Champion
- Russian Elite Hockey Goal Scoring Champion

Preceded by Soviet Championship League	International Hockey League; 1992—1996	Succeeded by Russian Superleague

== Sources ==
- International Hockey League (in Russian)
- Sports 123
