= List of Barys Astana head coaches =

Barys Astana is a professional ice hockey team based in Astana, Kazakhstan. They play in the Chernyshev Division of the Eastern Conference in the Kontinental Hockey League (KHL). The team founded in 1999. Barys is owned by Kazakhstan Temir Zholy (Kazakhstan Rail Ways), Nurlan Orazbayev is their president, Vadim Gusseinov is their general manager, Andrei Nazarov is their head coach and Brandon Bochenski is the team captain.

There have been 11 head coaches for the team. The Barys's first head coach was Nikolai Myshagin, who coached for four seasons. Alexander Vysotsky is the first Barys head coach to have won the major trophy. He guided Barys to Kazakhstan Hockey Championship win in 2007. He is also coached the team at those inaugural season in the Kontinental Hockey League, however was replaced by Andrei Shayanov in mid-season. On June 4, 2013, Ari-Pekka Selin signed a 2-year contract and announced as a new head coach of Barys for 2013–14 KHL season. On June 18, 2014, the KHL reported that Andrei Nazarov would move from Donbass Donetsk to become the new head coach at Barys, replacing Ari-Pekka Selin who had been sacked as coach of the Kazakhstan men's national ice hockey team on June 11 for unsatisfactory result in the 2014 IIHF World Championship.

== Key ==
#	Number of coaches^{[A]}
GC	Games coached
W	Wins
L	Losses
T	Ties
Win%	Winning percentage
†	Spent entire professional head coaching career with Barys.

== Coaches ==
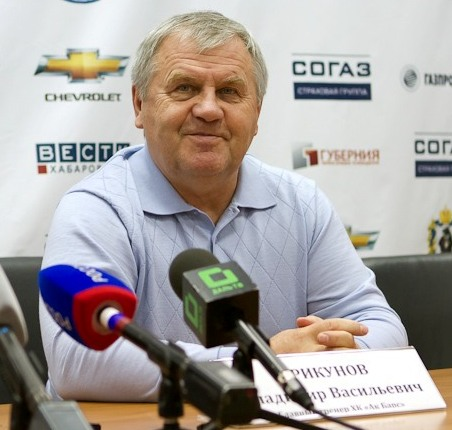
Vladimir Krikunov coached Barys during the 2012–13 season.

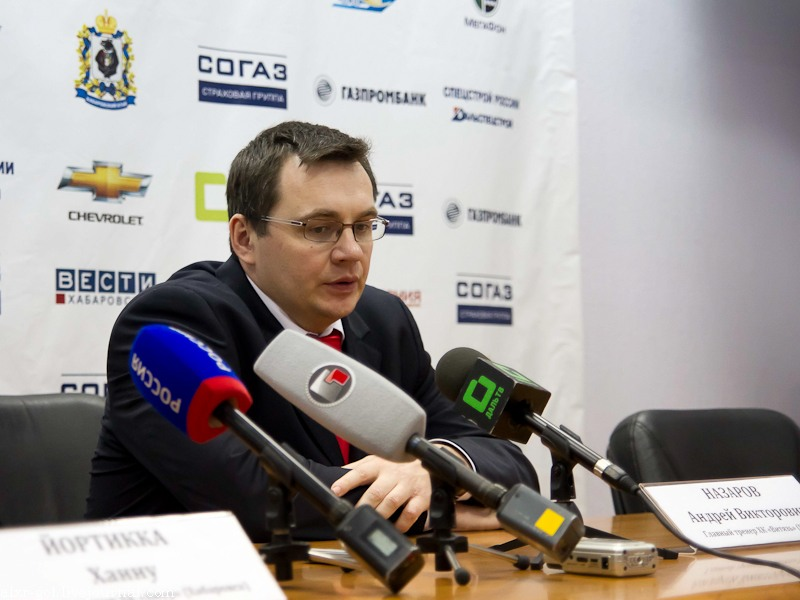
Andrei Nazarov is the current Barys head coach.

#	Name	Nat	From	To	Regular Season							Playoffs				Reference
#	Name	Nat	From	To	G	W	L	T	OTW	OTL	Pct	G	W	L	Pct	Reference
1	Nikolai Myshagin	(Kazakhstan)	2000	2002	48	36	11	1	—	—	—	—	—	—		
2	Sergei Mogilnikov	(Kazakhstan)	2002	2003	24	10	11	3	—	—	—	—	—	—		
3	Anatoli Melikhov	(Kazakhstan)	2003	2004	24	6	17	1	—	—	—	—	—	—		
4	Galym Mambetaliyev	(Kazakhstan)	2004	2005	28	13	13	1	0	1	—	—	—	—		
—	Nikolai Myshagin	(Kazakhstan)	2005	2007	44	17	19	5	2	1	—	—	—	—		
5	Mikhail Panin	(Russia)	2007	2007	3	2	0	—	0	0	—	—	—	—		
—	Sergei Mogilnikov	(Kazakhstan)	2007	2007	5	3	2	—	1	0	—	—	—	—		
6	Alexander Vysotsky	(Kazakhstan)	2007	2009	110	56	32	—	12	10	—	10	4	6		
7	Andrei Shayanov	(Kazakhstan)	2009	2010	56	20	23	—	6	7	—	3	0	3		
8	Andrei Khomutov	(Russia)	2010	2011	54	20	21	—	4	9	—	4	0	4		
—	Andrei Shayanov	(Kazakhstan)	2011	2012	54	25	22	—	3	4	—	7	3	4		—
9	Vladimir Krikunov	(Russia)	2012	2013	52	23	18	—	5	6	—	7	3	4		
10	Ari-Pekka Selin	(Finland)	2013	2014	54	26	18	—	6	4	—	10	6	4		
11	Andrei Nazarov	(Russia)	2014	Present	60	24	21	—	6	9	—	7	3	4		

== Notes ==
- ^{A} A running total of the number of coaches of Barys. Thus any coach who has two or more separate terms as head coach is only counted once.
