= History of Barys Astana =

The history of Barys Astana Kontinental Hockey League team dates back to 1999.

== 1999–2008: Early years ==
Barys was founded on November 26, 1999. The team's name, Barys, is derived from the national symbol of Kazakhstan, translated as snow leopard. The team's inaugural season was 1999–2000, where they played in the Kazakhstan Hockey Championship. Barys would stay there until 2009. In 2004–05, Barys was admitted into the Russian hockey system. They made their debut in the Pervaya Liga; in parallel, Barys kept a second team in the Kazakhstan Hockey Championship. Barys' debut in Russia was interesting, with the team doing fairly well. They played three seasons in the Pervaya Liga, where they finished respectively 3rd, 2nd and 1st of the Ural - Western Siberia zone where they played. With this first place in 2007, Barys was allowed into the Vysshaya Liga.

Historical leagues

Kazakhstan Hockey Championship 1999–2009
Pervaya Liga 2004–2007
Vysshaya Liga 2007–2008
Kontinental Hockey League 2008–present

Barys played a single season in the Vysshaya Liga, a good one, where they finished second out of 14 in the Eastern conference. They reached the playoffs, where they began by sweeping HC Belgorod in three straight games in the first round, before falling to Khimik Voskresensk in four games. Barys however won the Kazakhstan Hockey Championship that year. Barys' main team did not participate in the regular season of the league (however, its affiliate, Barys-2, did), but the league's format was so that the three best team of the league after the regular season would play the three best Kazakh teams (Barys' main team, Kazzinc-Torpedo and Kazakhmys Satpaev, all three were playing in the Vysshaya Liga) in the final round. Barys won the tournament, dethroning defending champions Kazzinc-Torpedo, en route to their first Kazakhstan Hockey Championship title.

== 2008–present: Kontinental Hockey League ==
=== 2008–2011: First round loses to Ak Bars ===
In 2008, Barys applied to join the newly formed Kontinental Hockey League. The league's authorities allowed Barys in, making it the first Kazakhstani team into the new league. The team won its first game in the KHL on September 3, 2008, abroad, defeating Neftekhimik Nizhnekamsk 2–1 in the shootouts. They registered their first home game eleven days later by beating defending Russian champions Salavat Yulaev Ufa 3–2, this time again in shootout. The team finished its first season with a 15th place overall in the league. Barys secured a spot in the playoffs on February 26, 2009, defeating 6-4 Vityaz Chekhov in the last day of the regular season. In the first round of Gagarin Cup playoffs, Barys faced Ak Bars Kazan. Kazan swept Astana three games to nothing to advance to the second round. Kevin Dallman finished the season as the league's fifth best scorer with 28 goals and 30 assists (58 points) record; he also finished as the league's leader for shots on goal with 217. Konstantin Glazachev finished 9th overall in the league in scoring with 52 points. Meanwhile, the team secured a second straight Kazakhstan Hockey Championship title.

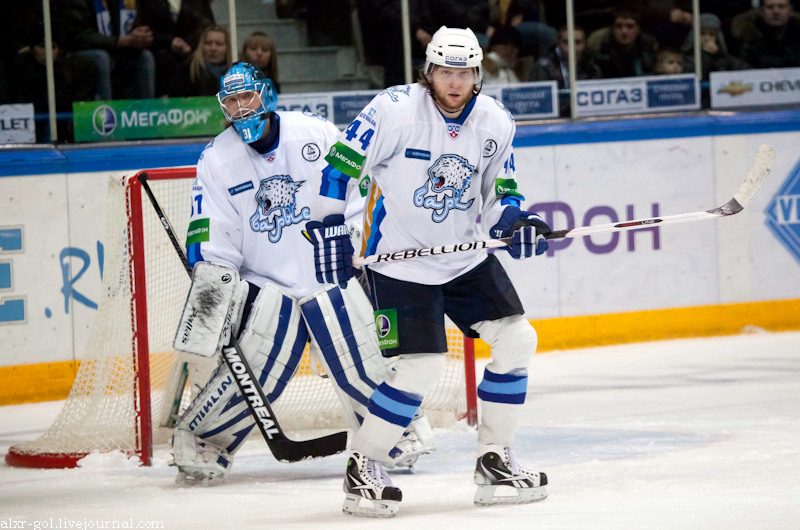
Vitali Yeremeyev and Jonas Junland during the game against Amur in 2011.

The 2009–10 season saw Barys have a very similar season than the previous. Veteran Jozef Stümpel finished top scorer of the team, with 52 points, two better than Maxim Spiridonov, who was the best goal scorer of the team with 24. Fan favourite Kevin Dallman also was a major contributor, with 14 goals and 27 assists. Newcomer Jeff Glass did a fine job between the pipes, with 19 wins and a 2.87 goals against average, helping the team finish fourteenth overall of the KHL, a one place improvement from 2008 to 2009. Barys was however once again swept in three games by Ak Bars Kazan in the first round of the playoffs.

Barys opened 2010–11 season with Andrei Khomutov as the new head coach. However, the team's previous manager Andrei Shayanov remained in the team as an assistant coach. In September 2011, league's authorities considered Kazakhstan Sports Palace the worst in the league. The main reason was the regrettably little capacity. Later, the team's owner Kazakhstan Temir Zholy decided to build the new Barys Arena for 12,000 seats, whose opening planned to 2015–16 season. The team compiled a 20–21–4–9 regular season record with 77 points. As the 7th seed of the Eastern Conference, Barys faced Ak Bars Kazan in the first round of playoffs, again. Ak Bars won series without losing a game 4–0.

=== 2011–present: BBD era ===
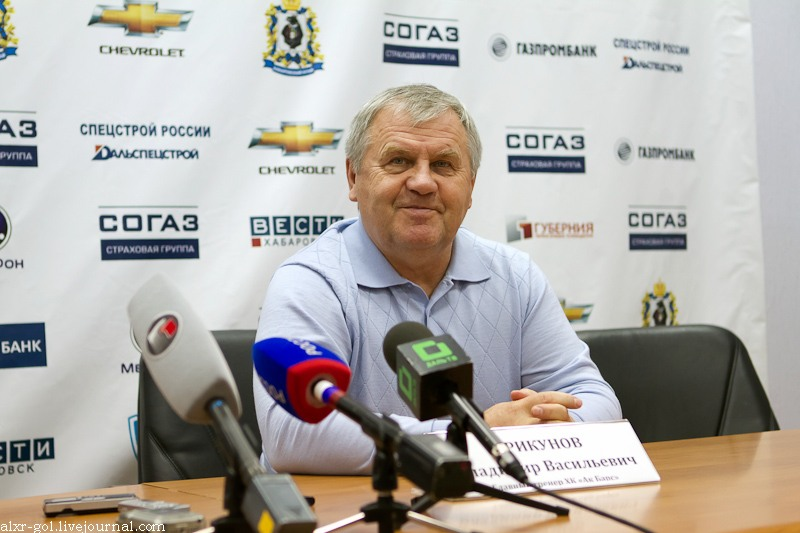
Vladimir Krikunov coached Barys during the 2012–13 season.

In the 2011 off-season, Barys announced the signing of Dustin Boyd and Nigel Dawes, who later formed BBD line along with Brandon Bochenski. In the beginning of the 2011–12 season, Barys fired Andrei Khomutov after seven losses in eight games. Andrei Shayanov replaced him and led the team to 6th place in the Eastern Conference. Barys fell in the Eastern Conference Quarterfinals to the 3rd seeded Metallurg Magnitogorsk in seven games.

During the 2012–13 NHL lockout, Barys strengthened by signing Ryan McDonagh, Victor Hedman and Nik Antropov. Vladimir Krikunov appointed as a new head coach. Barys finished the season with a 23–18–5–6 record for 85 points. In the first round of the 2013 Gagarin Cup playoffs, Barys defeated by Traktor Chelyabinsk 3–4 in series. After the season, Krikunov decided to leave the team, because he refused to coach the Kazakhstan national ice hockey team in parallel with Barys.

In the 2013 off-season, Barys appointed Ari-Pekka Selin as a new head coach. On July 4, 2013, Barys officially joined to newly created Astana Presidential Sports Club, the organization supported by Sovereign Wealth Fund Samruk-Kazyna to combine the main sports teams in Astana. Having resigned most of their free agents, the club wouldn't much change in the 2013 off-season, with the exception of losing UFAs Vadim Krasnoslobodtsev, Vitali Novopashin and Mikhail Grigoriev. On June 19, 2013, the team signed goalie Ari Ahonen for one year. Barys strengthened defense, signing Mike Lundin, Maxim Semyonov and Evgeni Blokhin. On August 8, 2013, unrestricted free agent Nik Antropov signed with the Barys a two-year deal. In its season opening game on September 8, 2013, Barys defeated Severstal Cherepovets 10–1. During the season, Barys signed a season long contracts with Cam Barker and Zach Hamill. Barys's Brandon Bochenski and Talgat Zhailauov selected to play in the 2014 KHL All-Star Game, as the result of fans and journalists voting. Barys finished as the 2nd seed in the Eastern Conference. Recording 26 wins, 18 losses, 6 overtime/shootout wins and 4 overtime/shootout losses, they finished with 94 points for the regular season. In the first round of the 2014 Gagarin Cup playoffs, Barys defeated Avtomobilist Yekaterinburg 4–0 in series to overcome the first round for the first time in its KHL history. Barys lost to Salavat Yulaev Ufa in Eastern Conference semifinals 2–4 in series.

On May 5, 2014, it was announced that former long-time Barys's captain Kevin Dallman signed a three-year contract. On June 18, 2014, the KHL reported that Andrei Nazarov would move from Donbass Donetsk to become the new head coach at Barys, replacing Ari-Pekka Selin who had been sacked as coach of the Kazakhstan national ice hockey team on June 11.
