= 2008–09 Barys Astana season =

2008–09 Barys Astana
- Kazakhstan champions
- League: 15th KHL
- Division: 5th Chernyshev
- 2008–09 record: 20-25-7-4
- Home record: 11-11-4-2
- Road record: 9-14-3-2
- Goals for: 174
- Goals against: 191

Team information
- Coach: Alexander Vysotsky; Andrei Shayanov
- Captain: Kevin Dallman
- Arena: Kazakhstan Sports Palace

Team leaders
- Goals: Konstantin Glazachev (28)
- Assists: Kevin Dallman (30)
- Points: Kevin Dallman (58)
- Penalty minutes: Tomas Kloucek (222)
- Wins: Alexei Kuznetsov
- Goals against average: Denis Franskevich (3.04)

The 2008–09 Barys Astana season was the Kontinental Hockey League franchise's 1st season and the last season of play at the Kazakhstan Hockey Championship, in parallel.

In 2008, Barys applied to join the newly formed Kontinental Hockey League. The league's authorities allowed Barys in, making it the first Kazakh team into the new league. The team won its first game in the KHL on September 3, 2008 abroad, defeating Neftekhimik Nizhnekamsk 2-1 in the shootouts. They registered their first home game eleven days later by beating defending Russian champions Salavat Yulaev Ufa 3-2, this time again in shootout. The team finished its first season with a 15th place overall in the league (5th out of 6 in the highly competitive Chernyshev division). The team made the playoffs and faced Ak Bars Kazan in the first round (2nd overall in the league); Kazan swept Astana three games to nothing to advance to the second round. Kevin Dallman finished the season as the league's fifth best scorer with a 28 goals and 30 assists (58 points) record; he also finished as the league's leader for shots on goal with 217. Konstantin Glazachev finished 9th overall in the league in scoring with 52 points (28 goals and 24 assists). Meanwhile, the team secured a second straight Kazakhstan Hockey Championship title.

== Standings ==
=== Kontinental Hockey League ===
==== Divisional standings ====
	Chernyshev Division	GP	W	OTW	SOW	SOL	OTL	L	GF	GA	Pts
1	(Russia) Ak Bars Kazan	56	36	1	3	3	3	10	189	123	122
3	(Russia) Dynamo Moscow	56	27	4	3	3	2	17	184	143	100
2	(Russia) Torpedo Nizhny Novgorod	56	24	2	2	3	1	24	162	162	84
4	(Russia) Neftekhimik Nizhnekamsk	56	22	2	1	5	2	24	146	140	79
5	(Kazakhstan) Barys Astana	56	20	3	4	2	2	25	174	191	78
6	(Russia) Vityaz Chekhov	56	6	2	3	7	5	33	134	225	40

=== Kazakhstan Hockey Championship ===
==== Final round ====
		GP	W	OTW	SOW	SOL	OTL	L	GF	GA	Pts
1	(Kazakhstan) Barys Astana	5	4	1	0	0	0	0	29	8	14
2	(Kazakhstan) Kazzinc-Torpedo	5	4	0	0	0	1	0	23	8	13
3	(Kazakhstan) Kazakhmys Satpaev	5	3	0	0	0	0	2	18	20	9
4	(Kazakhstan) Saryarka Karagandy	5	2	0	0	0	0	3	17	13	6
5	(Kazakhstan) Gornyak Rudny	5	1	0	0	0	0	4	12	22	3
6	(Kazakhstan) Yertis Pavlodar	5	0	0	0	0	0	5	8	36	0

== Schedule and results ==
=== Kontinental Hockey League ===
==== Regular season ====
2008–09 Game Log
September: 3–6–3–0 (Home: 0–4–2–0; Road: 3–2–1–0) Pts. 15

Game	Date	Opponent	Score	Decision	Location	Attendance	Record	Points	Recap
1	September 3	Neftekhimik Nizhnekamsk	2-1 (SO)	Denis Franskevich	Neftekhimik Ice Palace	5,500	0-0-1-0	2	
2	September 5	Lada Togliatti	1-2	Denis Franskevich	Volgar Sports Palace	2,900	0-1-1-0	2	
3	September 7	Ak Bars Kazan	2-3	Marc Lamothe	TatNeft Arena	4,600	0-2-1-0	2	
4	September 11	Traktor Chelyabinsk	3-4	Denis Franskevich	Kazakhstan Sports Palace	4,200	0-3-1-0	2	
5	September 12	Metallurg Magnitogorsk	3-4	Marc Lamothe	Kazakhstan Sports Palace	3,900	0-4-1-0	2	
6	September 14	Salavat Yulaev Ufa	3-2 (SO)	Marc Lamothe	Kazakhstan Sports Palace	4,500	0-4-2-0	4	
7	September 16	Neftekhimik Nizhnekamsk	3-2 (OT)	Marc Lamothe	Kazakhstan Sports Palace	3,500	0-4-3-0	6	
8	September 17	Ak Bars Kazan	2-7	Alexei Kuznetsov	Kazakhstan Sports Palace	5,200	0-5-3-0	6	
9	September 21	Amur Khabarovsk	2-1	Denis Franskevich	Platinum Arena	7,100	1-5-3-0	9	
10	September 23	Sibir Novosibirsk	4-2	Denis Franskevich	Ice Sports Palace Sibir	5,500	2-5-3-0	12	
11	September 26	Metallurg Novokuznetsk	4-3	Denis Franskevich	Kuznetsk Metallurgists Arena	5,200	3-5-3-0	15	
12	September 29	Atlant Moscow Oblast	3-4	Denis Franskevich	Kazakhstan Sports Palace	5,000	3-6-3-0	15	

October: 6–3–2–1 (Home: 4–0–1–0; Road: 2–3–1–1) Pts. 23

Game	Date	Opponent	Score	Decision	Location	Attendance	Record	Points	Recap
13	October 1	HC MVD	4-2	Marc Lamothe	Kazakhstan Sports Palace	4,200	4-6-3-0	18	
14	October 2	Torpedo Nizhny Novgorod	3-0	Alexei Kuznetsov	Kazakhstan Sports Palace	3,500	5-6-3-0	21	
15	October 8	CSKA Moscow	3-4 (OT)	Alexei Kuznetsov	CSKA Ice Palace	4,100	5-6-3-1	22	
16	October 10	Vityaz Chekhov	5-4 (OT)	Denis Franskevich	Ice Hockey Center 2004	2,000	5-6-4-1	24	
17	October 12	Spartak Moscow	3-4	Alexei Kuznetsov	Luzhniki Minor Arena	2,900	5-7-4-1	24	
18	October 14	Neftekhimik Nizhnekamsk	2-4	Denis Franskevich	Neftekhimik Ice Palace	4,500	5-8-4-1	24	
19	October 18	Dinamo Minsk	5-2	Alexei Kuznetsov	Kazakhstan Sports Palace	5,000	6-8-4-1	27	
20	October 20	Dinamo Riga	3-0	Alexei Kuznetsov	Kazakhstan Sports Palace	5,000	7-8-4-1	30	
21	October 22	Dynamo Moscow	5-4 (SO)	Alexei Kuznetsov	Kazakhstan Sports Palace	5,500	7-8-5-1	32	
22	October 26	Torpedo Nizhny Novgorod	3-2	Alexei Kuznetsov	Trade Union Sport Palace	5,400	8-8-5-1	35	
23	October 28	Severstal Cherepovets	6-2	Alexei Kuznetsov	Ice Palace Cherepovets	2,700	9-8-5-1	38	
24	October 30	Lokomotiv Yaroslavl	1-7	Alexei Kuznetsov	Arena 2000	9,046	9-9-5-1	38	

November: 3–2–0–0 (Home: 2–0–0–0; Road: 1–2–0–0) Pts. 9

Game	Date	Opponent	Score	Decision	Location	Attendance	Record	Points	Recap
25	November 1	SKA Saint Petersburg	2-4	Denis Franskevich	Ice Palace Saint Petersburg	3,000	9-10-5-1	38	
26	November 15	Avangard Omsk	4-2	Alexei Kuznetsov	Kazakhstan Sports Palace	5,000	10-10-5-1	41	
27	November 19	Khimik Voskresensk	6-3	Alexei Kuznetsov	Podmoskovie Sports Palace	3,100	11-10-5-1	44	
28	November 21	Ak Bars Kazan	0-7	Alexei Kuznetsov	TatNeft Arena	5,100	11-11-5-1	44	
29	November 25	Khimik Voskresensk	4-2	Alexei Kuznetsov	Kazakhstan Sports Palace	5,000	12-11-5-1	47	

December: 2–6–1–0 (Home: 0–4–0–0; Road: 2–2–1–0) Pts. 8

Game	Date	Opponent	Score	Decision	Location	Attendance	Record	Points	Recap
30	December 1	Avangard Omsk	5-2	Alexei Kuznetsov	Omsk Arena	8,000	13-11-5-1	50	
31	December 6	SKA Saint Petersburg	1-4	Alexei Kuznetsov	Kazakhstan Sports Palace	5,000	13-12-5-1	50	
32	December 8	Severstal Cherepovets	1-4	Alexei Kuznetsov	Kazakhstan Sports Palace	5,000	13-13-5-1	50	
33	December 10	Lokomotiv Yaroslavl	3-6	Marc Lamothe	Kazakhstan Sports Palace	5,000	13-14-5-1	50	
34	December 13	Dynamo Moscow	2-7	Alexei Kuznetsov	Kazakhstan Sports Palace	5,000	13-15-5-1	50	
35	December 22	Dinamo Minsk	3-2	Alexei Kuznetsov	Minsk Sports Palace	3,200	14-15-5-1	53	
36	December 24	Dynamo Moscow	6-7	Alexei Kuznetsov	Luzhniki Minor Arena	4,500	14-16-5-1	53	
37	December 26	Vityaz Chekhov	3-2 (OT)	Marc Lamothe	Ice Hockey Center 2004	2,700	14-16-6-1	55	
38	December 28	Dinamo Riga	0-1	Marc Lamothe	Arena Riga	8,500	14-17-6-1	55	

January: 3–5–1–1 (Home: 2–2–1–1; Road: 1–3–0–0) Pts. 15

Game	Date	Opponent	Score	Decision	Location	Attendance	Record	Points	Recap
39	January 4	Vityaz Chekhov	11-6	Marc Lamothe	Kazakhstan Sports Palace	5,000	15-17-6-1	58	
40	January 5	Spartak Moscow	3-5	Alexei Kuznetsov	Kazakhstan Sports Palace	5,000	15-18-6-1	58	
41	January 7	CSKA Moscow	2-5	Denis Franskevich	Kazakhstan Sports Palace	5,000	15-19-6-1	58	
42	January 15	Torpedo Nizhny Novgorod	1-6	Alexei Kuznetsov	Kuznetsk Metallurgists Arena	5,400	15-20-6-1	58	
43	January 17	Dynamo Moscow	3-4	Alexei Kuznetsov	Luzhniki Minor Arena	3,300	15-21-6-1	58	
44	January 19	Atlant Moscow Oblast	1-5	Alexei Kuznetsov	Mytishchi Arena	5,500	15-22-6-1	58	
45	January 21	HC MVD	3-0	Alexei Kuznetsov	Balashikha Arena	4,300	16-22-6-1	61	
46	January 26	Amur Khabarovsk	5-4 (SO)	Alexei Kuznetsov	Kazakhstan Sports Palace	5,000	16-22-7-1	63	
47	January 28	Metallurg Novokuznetsk	3-1	Alexei Kuznetsov	Kazakhstan Sports Palace	5,000	17-22-7-1	66	
48	January 30	Sibir Novosibirsk	3-4 (SO)	Alexei Kuznetsov	Kazakhstan Sports Palace	5,000	17-22-7-2	67	

February: 3–3–0–2 (Home: 3–1–0–1; Road: 0–2–0–1) Pts. 11

Game	Date	Opponent	Score	Decision	Location	Attendance	Record	Points	Recap
49	February 12	Traktor Chelyabinsk	1-3	Alexei Kuznetsov	Traktor Ice Arena	5,000	17-23-7-2	67	
50	February 14	Metallurg Magnitogorsk	2-5	Alexei Kuznetsov	Arena Metallurg	7,215	17-24-7-2	67	
51	February 16	Salavat Yulaev Ufa	1-2 (OT)	Alexei Kuznetsov	Ufa Arena	8,400	17-24-7-3	68	
52	February 20	Ak Bars Kazan	0-3	Alexei Kuznetsov	Kazakhstan Sports Palace	5,000	17-25-7-3	68	
53	February 22	Lada Togliatti	3-4 (SO)	Alexei Kuznetsov	Kazakhstan Sports Palace	5,000	17-25-7-4	69	
54	February 24	Neftekhimik Nizhnekamsk	6-5	Alexei Kuznetsov	Kazakhstan Sports Palace	5,000	18-25-7-4	72	
55	February 25	Torpedo Nizhny Novgorod	5-2	Alexei Kuznetsov	Kazakhstan Sports Palace	5,000	19-25-7-4	75	
56	February 25	Vityaz Chekhov	6-4	Alexei Kuznetsov	Kazakhstan Sports Palace	5,000	20-25-7-4	78	

Win (3 points) Overtime/shootout win (2 points) Overtime/shootout loss (1 point) Loss (0 points)

==== Playoffs ====
2009 Gagarin Cup Playoffs
Preliminary Round - #15 Barys vs. #2 Ak Bars – Ak Bars won series 3–0

Game	Date	Opponent	Score	Decision	Location	Attendance	Series	Recap
1	March 2	Ak Bars Kazan	2–4	Alexei Kuznetsov	TatNeft Arena	5,400	0-1	
2	March 3	Ak Bars Kazan	2–4	Alexei Kuznetsov	TatNeft Arena	4,390	0-2	
3	March 5	Ak Bars Kazan	1–2 (SO)	Alexei Kuznetsov	Kazakhstan Sports Palace	5,000	0-3	

Win Loss

=== Kazakhstan Hockey Championship ===
==== Final Round ====
2009 Final Round
Result: 4–0–1–0 Pts. 14 - Barys won the championship

Game	Date	Opponent	Score	Decision	Location	Record	Points	Recap
1	March 26	Yertis Pavlodar	5-1	Denis Franskevich	Astana Ice Palace, Pavlodar, Kazakhstan	1-0-0-0	3	
2	March 27	Gornyak Rudny	8-0	Alexei Kuznetsov	Astana Ice Palace, Pavlodar, Kazakhstan	2-0-0-0	6	
3	March 28	Kazakhmys Satpaev	9-3	Alexei Kuznetsov	Astana Ice Palace, Pavlodar, Kazakhstan	3-0-0-0	9	
4	March 30	Saryarka Karagandy	3-1	Alexei Kuznetsov	Astana Ice Palace, Pavlodar, Kazakhstan	4-0-0-0	12	
5	March 31	Kazzinc-Torpedo	4-3 (SO)	Alexei Kuznetsov	Astana Ice Palace, Pavlodar, Kazakhstan	4-0-1-0	14	

Win (3 points) Overtime/shootout win (2 points) Overtime/shootout loss (1 point) Loss (0 points)

== Final roster ==
Updated March 14, 2010.

No.	Nat	Player	Pos	S/G	Age	Acquired	Birthplace
1	(Russia)	Denis Franskevich	G	L	45	2008	Karaganda, Kazakh SSR
35	(Canada)	Marc Lamothe	G	L	52	2008	New Liskeard, Ontario, Canada
20	(Kazakhstan)	Alexei Kuznetsov	G	L	43	2007	Ust-Kamenogorsk, Kazakh SSR
7	(Kazakhstan)	Artemi Lakiza	D	L	39	2007	Barnaul, Russian SFSR
44	(Russia)	Alexander Titov	D	L	51	2008	Lipetsk, Russian SFSR
37	(Kazakhstan)	Evgeni Fadeyev	D	L	44	2007	Ust-Kamenogorsk, Kazakh SSR
36	(Kazakhstan)	Vladimir Antipin	D	L	56	2008	Temirtau, Kazakh SSR
24	(Slovakia)	Branislav Mezei	D	L	45	2008	Nitra, Slovakia
59	(Russia)	Sergei Gimayev	D	L	42	2008	Cherepovets, Russian SFSR
22	(Czech Republic)	Tomas Kloucek	D	L	46	2008	Prague, Czechoslovakia
24	(Kazakhstan)	Anton Kazantsev	D	L	39	2008	Rudny, Kazakh SSR
38	(Canada)	Kevin Dallman (C)	D	R	45	2008	Niagara Falls, Ontario, Canada
2	(Kazakhstan)	Roman Savchenko	D	L	38	2008	Ust-Kamenogorsk, Kazakh SSR
29	(Kazakhstan)	Alexei Vasilchenko	D	L	45	2008	Ust-Kamenogorsk, Kazakh SSR
79	(Kazakhstan)	Maksim Belyayev	F	L	46	2008	Ust-Kamenogorsk, Kazakh SSR
8	(Kazakhstan)	Talgat Zhailauov	C	R	41	2007	Ust-Kamenogorsk, Kazakh SSR
15	(Slovakia)	Jozef Stümpel (A)	C	R	54	2008	Nitra, Czechoslovakia
23	(Kazakhstan)	Andrei Spiridonov	C	L	44	2008	Ust-Kamenogorsk, Kazakh SSR
48	(Kazakhstan)	Roman Starchenko	C	L	40	2008	Ust-Kamenogorsk, Kazakh SSR
25	(Kazakhstan)	Ilya Solaryov	C	L	44	2007	Perm, Russian SFSR
62	(Kazakhstan)	Vadim Krasnoslobodtsev	LW	L	42	2008	Ust-Kamenogorsk, Kazakh SSR
18	(Russia)	Konstantin Glazachev	LW	R	41	2008	Arkhangelsk, Russian SFSR
17	(Kazakhstan)	Alexander Koreshkov	LW	L	62	2007	Ust-Kamenogorsk, Kazakh SSR
10	(Russia)	Maxim Spiridonov (A)	RW	L	48	2008	Moscow, Russian SFSR
33	(Kazakhstan)	Andrei Gavrilin	RW	L	48	2007	Karaganda, Kazakh SSR
9	(Canada)	Trevor Letowski	RW	R	49	2008	Thunder Bay, Ontario, Canada

== See also ==
- 2008–09 KHL season
