= Remir Khaidarov =

Russian ice hockey player

- Born: December 29, 1977; Kazan, Russian SFSR, Soviet Union
- Died: June 29, 2012 (aged 34); Kazan, Russia
- Height: 6 ft 2 in (188 cm)
- Weight: 220 lb (100 kg; 15 st 10 lb)
- Position: Defenceman
- Shot: Right
- Played for: Ak Bars Kazan; Neftekhimik Nizhnekamsk; Neftyanik Leninogorsk; Molot-Prikamye Perm; Khimik Voskresensk; Neftyanik Almetievsk; Barys Astana; Mechel Chelyabinsk; Rubin Tyumen
- Playing career: 1996–2012

Remir Amirovich Khaidarov (Tatar: Рәмир Амир улы Хәйдәрев, Russian: Ремир Амирович Хайдаров; born December 29, 1977) was a Russian professional ice hockey player.

Sporting positions
Preceded by Ildar Yubin	Barys Astana captain 2007–08	Succeeded by Kevin Dallman
