= Ari-Pekka Selin =

Finnish ice hockey player and coach

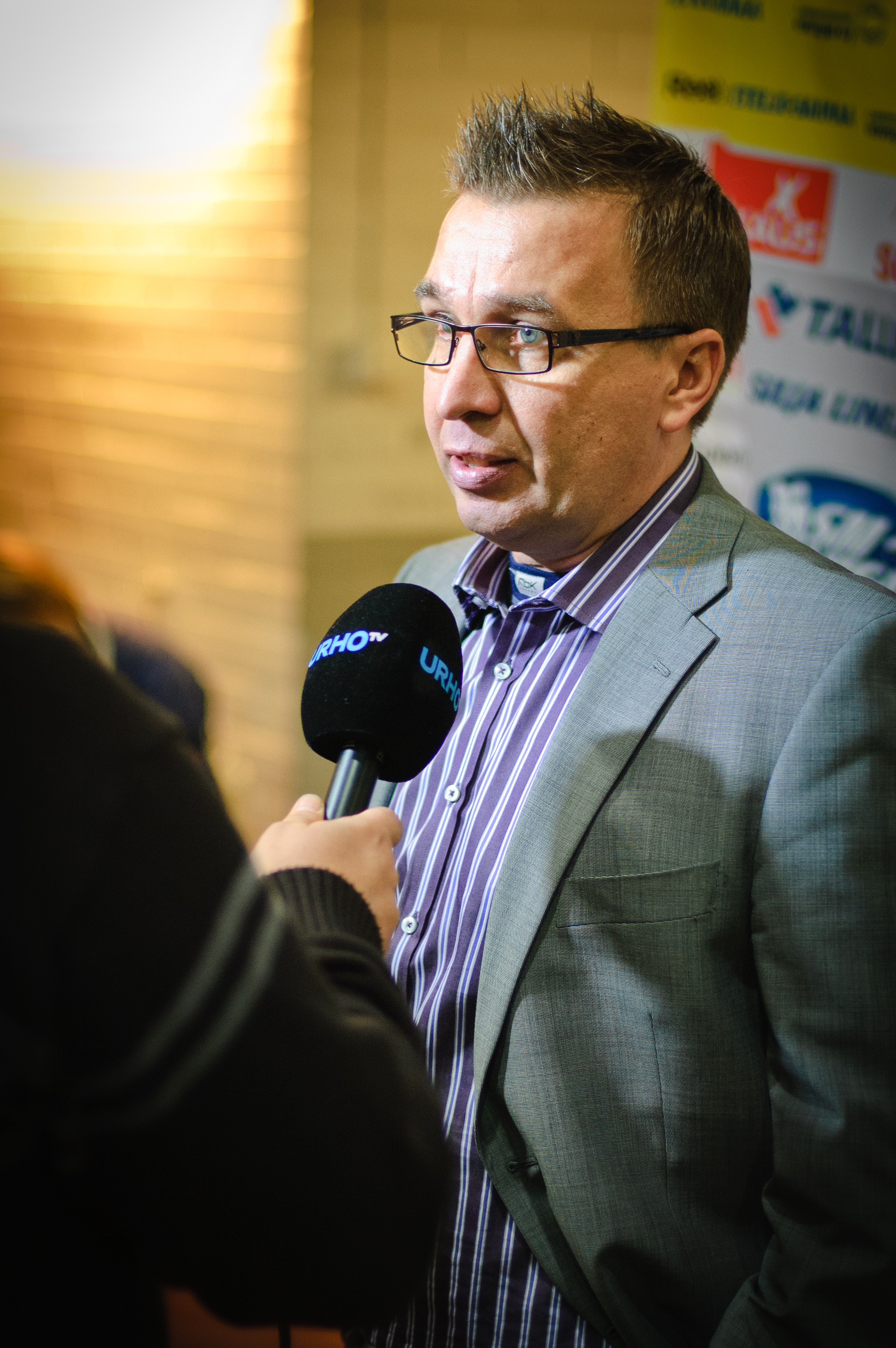
- Born: May 17, 1963 Pori, Finland
- Position: Defenceman
- Played for: Peliitat Heinola; Kiruna AIF; Savonlinnan Pallokerho
- Playing career: 1984–1993

Ari-Pekka Selin (born May 17, 1963) is a former professional ice hockey player and coach. During the 2013–2014 season, he coached both Barys Astana of the Kontinental Hockey League (KHL) and the Kazakhstan men's national ice hockey team.

He was hired to be the Barys' head coach on June 4, 2013, replacing Vladimir Krikunov. On June 11, 2014, he was relieved as coach of the Kazakh National Team. It was reported a week later that he had been replaced as coach of Barys by Andrei Nazarov.

He previously served as the head coach of SaPKo Savonlinna, Ilves Tampere, SaiPa Lappeenranta and HPK Hämeenlinna.

== Coaching career ==
- 1995–1999 (Finland) SaPKo Savonlinna - head coach
- 1999–2001 (Finland) Ilves Tampere - assistant coach
- 2001–2003 (Finland) Ilves Tampere - head coach
- 2003–2005 (Finland) SaPKo Savonlinna - head coach
- 2005–2007 (Finland) SaiPa Lappeenranta - assistant coach
- 2007–2012 (Finland) SaiPa Lappeenranta - head coach
- 2012–2013 Finland men's national ice hockey team - assistant coach
- 2012–2013 (Finland) HPK Hämeenlinna - head coach
- 2013–2014 Kazakhstan men's national ice hockey team - head coach
- 2013–2014 (Kazakhstan) Barys Astana - head coach
- 2015–2017 (Finland) TPS Turku - head coach
- 2017–2019 (Finland) HIFK Helsinki - head coach
- 2019–2021 (Finland) Ässät Pori - head coach (replaced by Karri Kivi during the 2021–22 season)

== Coaching record ==
Team	League	Year	Regular season							Postseason
Team	League	Year	G	W	OTW	OTL	L	Pts	Finish	Result
BAR	KHL	2013–14	54	26	6	4	18	94	1st in Chernyshev	Lost in Conference Semifinals (SAL)

Sporting positions
Preceded by Vladimir Krikunov	Head coach of the Barys Astana; 2013–14	Succeeded by Andrei Nazarov
