= Denis Franskevich =

Kazakhstani-Russian ice hockey player

- Born: June 6, 1981 (age 44) Karaganda, Kazakh SSR, USSR
- Height: 5 ft 10 in (178 cm)
- Weight: 170 lb (77 kg; 12 st 2 lb)
- Position: Goaltender
- Shoots: Left
- VHL team Former teams: Rubin Tyumen; Neftekhimik Nizhnekamsk; Neftyanik Leninogorsk; Avtomobilist Yekaterinburg; Barys Astana; Saryarka Karagandy
- Playing career: 2001–present

Denis Franskevich (born June 6, 1981 in Karaganda, Kazakh SSR, USSR) is a Kazakhstani-Russian professional ice hockey goaltender who currently plays for Rubin Tyumen of the Higher Hockey League (VHL).
