= Ildar Yubin =

Russian ice hockey player

- Born: June 8, 1974 (age 52) Yaroslavl, Russian SFSR, Soviet Union
- Height: 5 ft 10 in (178 cm)
- Weight: 194 lb (88 kg; 13 st 12 lb)
- Position: Defenceman
- Played for: Torpedo Yaroslavl; Dayton Bombers; Krylia Sovetov Moscow; Amur Khabarovsk; Sibir Novosibirsk; Khimik Voskresensk; Kazakhmys Satpaev; Barys Astana
- Playing career: 1992–2010

Ildar Vladimirovich Yubin (Russian: Ильдар Владимирович Юбин; born June 8, 1974) is a former Russian professional ice hockey player.

== Career statistics ==
			Regular season					Playoffs
Season	Team	League	GP	G	A	Pts	PIM	GP	G	A	Pts	PIM
1990–91	ShVSM Yaroslavl	Soviet3	35	1	2	3	4	—	—	—	—	—
1991–92	Torpedo Yaroslavl	Soviet	—	—	—	—	—	—	—	—	—	—
1991–92	Yarinterkom Yaroslavl	Soviet3	65	6	1	7	40	—	—	—	—	—
1992–93	Torpedo Yaroslavl	Russia	30	1	0	1	4	3	0	0	0	0
1992–93	Yarinterkom Yaroslavl	Russia2	6	0	0	0	4	—	—	—	—	—
1993–94	Torpedo Yaroslavl	Russia	27	2	0	2	4	4	0	0	0	2
1993–94	Torpedo Yaroslavl-2	Russia3	23	3	5	8	32	—	—	—	—	—
1994–95	Torpedo Yaroslavl	Russia	44	0	2	2	18	1	0	0	0	0
1994–95	Torpedo Yaroslavl-2	Russia2	18	1	2	3	4	—	—	—	—	—
1995–96	Molot Perm	Russia	52	8	6	14	58	2	0	0	0	2
1995–96	Molot Perm-2	Russia2	1	1	1	2	4	—	—	—	—	—
1996–97	Dayton Bombers	ECHL	38	4	10	14	98	3	0	0	0	4
1997–98	Severstal Cherepovets-2	Russia3	4	0	0	0	4	—	—	—	—	—
1997–98	Torpedo Yaroslavl	Russia	38	2	3	5	147	6	0	0	0	37
1997–98	Torpedo Yaroslavl-2	Russia3	—	—	—	—	—	—	—	—	—	—
1998–99	Torpedo Yaroslavl	Russia	41	2	1	3	57	14	1	0	1	36
1998–99	Torpedo Yaroslavl-2	Russia2	5	1	3	4	6	—	—	—	—	—
1999–00	Torpedo Yaroslavl	Russia	30	2	3	5	66	10	0	0	0	0
1999–00	Torpedo Yaroslavl-2	Russia3	3	1	0	1	0	—	—	—	—	—
2000–01	Krylya Sovetov Moscow	Russia2	44	4	20	24	43	14	4	2	6	4
2001–02	Krylya Sovetov Moscow	Russia	48	3	1	4	34	2	0	0	0	2
2001–02	Krylya Sovetov Moscow-2	Russia3	2	0	2	2	0	—	—	—	—	—
2002–03	Amur Khabarovsk	Russia	17	0	2	2	18	—	—	—	—	—
2002–03	Amur Khabarovsk-2	Russia3	2	0	1	1	4	—	—	—	—	—
2002–03	HC Sibir Novosibirsk	Russia	20	1	3	4	16	—	—	—	—	—
2003–04	HC Sibir Novosibirsk	Russia	33	1	4	5	18	—	—	—	—	—
2003–04	HC Sibir Novosibirsk-2	Russia3	2	1	0	1	2	—	—	—	—	—
2004–05	HC Sibir Novosibirsk	Russia	54	2	3	5	46	—	—	—	—	—
2004–05	HC Sibir Novosibirsk-2	Russia3	2	0	0	0	0	—	—	—	—	—
2005–06	Khimik Voskresensk	Russia2	19	0	5	5	18	—	—	—	—	—
2006–07	Kazakhmys Satpaev	Kazakhstan	23	8	3	11	8	—	—	—	—	—
2006–07	Kazakhmys Satpaev	Russia2	48	2	11	13	84	—	—	—	—	—
2007–08	Barys Astana	Russia2	21	0	3	3	20	—	—	—	—	—
2007–08	Kazakhmys Satpaev	Russia2	17	1	6	7	18	11	0	3	3	24
2008–09	Krylya Sovetov Moscow	Russia2	63	8	16	24	62	—	—	—	—	—
2009–10	Krylya Sovetov Moscow	Russia2	52	2	9	11	28	5	0	0	0	6
ECHL totals			38	4	10	14	98	3	0	0	0	4
Russia totals			434	24	28	52	486	42	1	0	1	79
Russia2 totals			294	20	76	96	291	30	4	5	9	34

Sporting positions
Preceded by Sergei Nevstruyev	Barys Astana captain 2007	Succeeded by Remir Khaidarov
