= Aleksey Igorevich Kuznetsov =

Kazakhstani ice hockey goalie

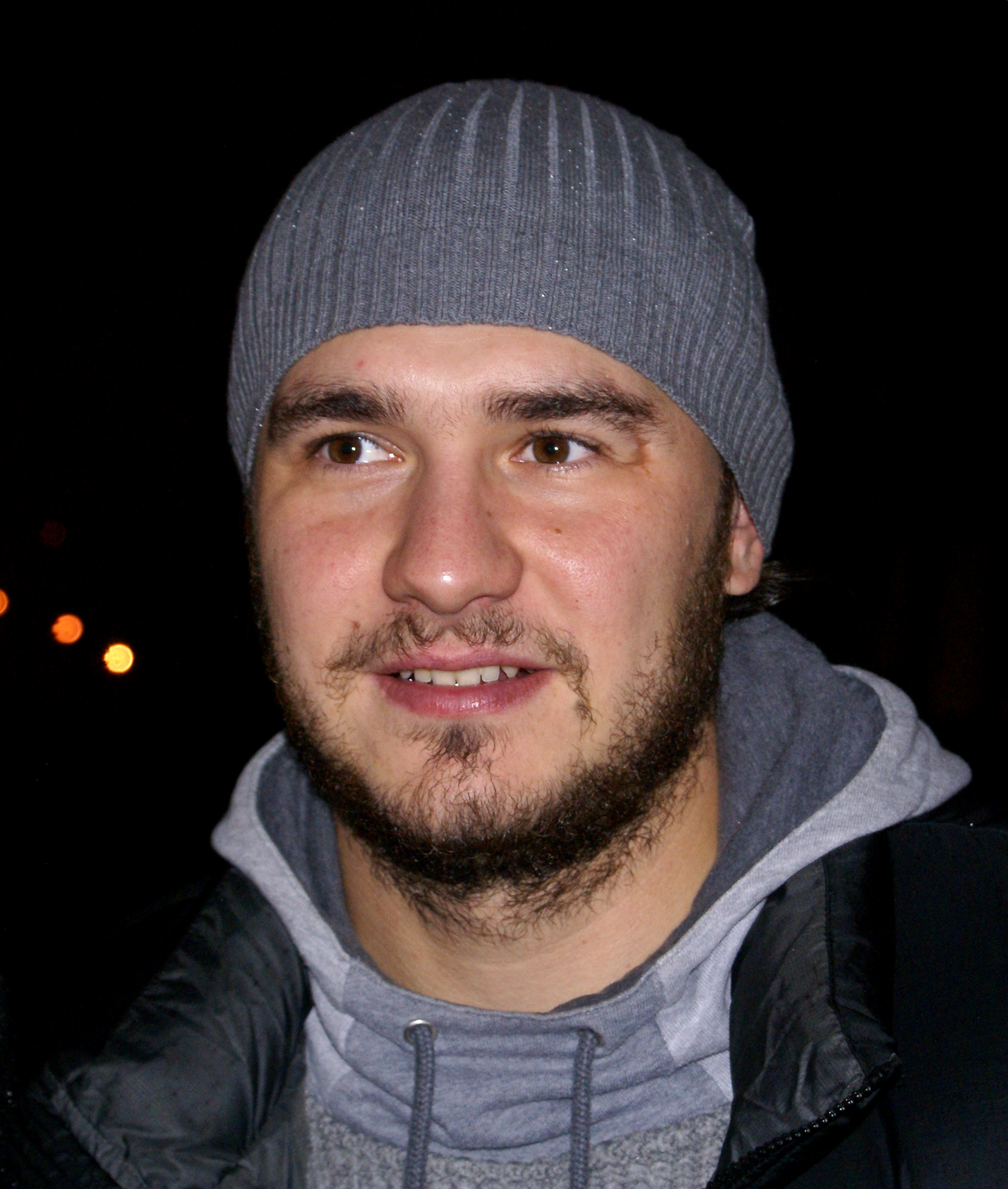
- Born: February 1, 1983 (age 43) Ust-Kamenogorsk, Kazakh SSR, Soviet Union
- Height: 6 ft 0 in (183 cm)
- Weight: 203 lb (92 kg; 14 st 7 lb)
- Position: Goaltender
- Shoots: Left
- KHL team Former teams: Yugra Khanty-Mansiysk; Sibir Novosibirsk; Avangard Omsk; Kazzinc-Torpedo; Saryarka Karagandy; Barys Astana; Amur Khabarovsk
- National team: Kazakhstan
- NHL draft: Undrafted
- Playing career: 2001–present

Aleksey Igorevich Kuznetsov (Russian: Алексей Игоревич Кузнецо́в; born February 1, 1983) is a Kazakhstani professional ice hockey goaltender. He currently plays for Yugra Khanty-Mansiysk of the Kontinental Hockey League (KHL).

Kuznetsov competed at the 2010 IIHF World Championship as a member of the Kazakhstan men's national ice hockey team.
