= Andrei Nazarov =

Russian ice hockey player and coach

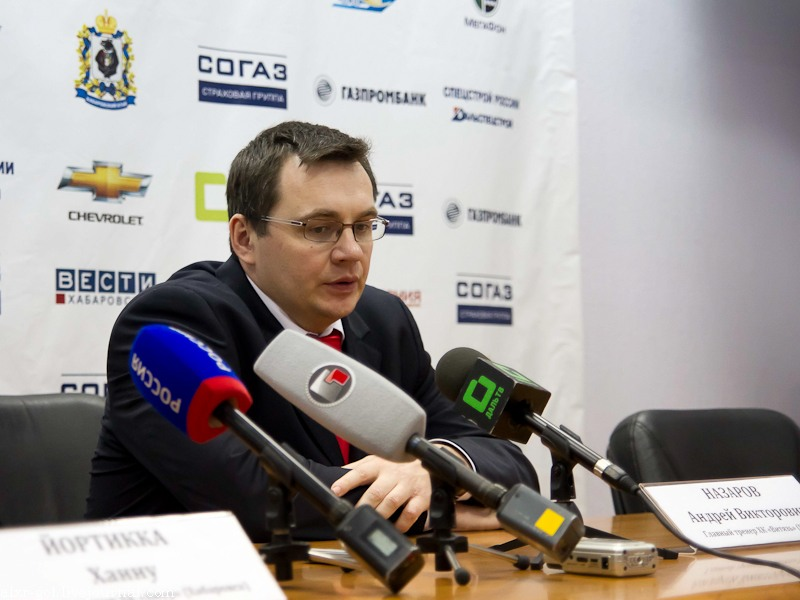
- Born: May 22, 1974 (age 51) Chelyabinsk, Soviet Union
- Height: 6 ft 5 in (196 cm)
- Weight: 245 lb (111 kg; 17 st 7 lb)
- Position: Left wing
- Shot: Right
- Played for: Dynamo Moscow; San Jose Sharks; Tampa Bay Lightning; Calgary Flames; Mighty Ducks of Anaheim; Boston Bruins; Phoenix Coyotes; Metallurg Novokuznetsk; Avangard Omsk; Minnesota Wild
- National team: Russia
- NHL draft: 10th overall, 1992; San Jose Sharks
- Playing career: 1991–2006

Andrei Viktorovich Nazarov (Russian: Андрей Викторович Назаров; born May 22, 1974) is a Russian former professional ice hockey player and coach. He has formerly managed the Kazakh team Barys Astana (of the KHL's Chernyshev Division), the Russian team HC Sochi (of the KHL's Bobrov Division), the Ukrainian national team and has been joint coach of the Russian national hockey team. He has been nicknamed "the Russian Bear", and in his coaching career, "the Russian Keenan".

== Career ==
Nazarov was drafted 10th overall by the San Jose Sharks in the 1992 NHL entry draft. He also played for the Tampa Bay Lightning, Calgary Flames, Mighty Ducks of Anaheim, Boston Bruins, Phoenix Coyotes and the Minnesota Wild. In his NHL career, Nazarov played 571 regular season games, scoring 53 goals and 71 assists for 124 points. He also collected 1,409 penalty minutes.

Nazarov served only one season (2013-2014) as the coach of HC Donbass before moving to Barys.

In 2021, without any evidence, Nazarov accused NHL star Artemi Panarin of assaulting a woman, later saying he was motivated to make the accusation due to Panarin's comments supporting anti-government protests in Russia. Nazarov, a known supporter of Russian leader Vladimir Putin, has repeatedly and publicly criticized Panarin for his outspoken beliefs regarding Putin’s regime.

== Career statistics ==
=== Regular season and playoffs ===
			Regular season					Playoffs
Season	Team	League	GP	G	A	Pts	PIM	GP	G	A	Pts	PIM
1990–91	Mechel Chelyabinsk	USR.2	2	0	0	0	0	—	—	—	—	—
1991–92	Dynamo Moscow	CIS	2	1	0	1	2	—	—	—	—	—
1991–92	Dynamo–2 Moscow	CIS.3	40	13	6	19	47	—	—	—	—	—
1992–93	Dynamo Moscow	RUS	42	8	2	10	79	10	1	1	2	8
1992–93	Dynamo–2 Moscow	RUS.2	1	0	0	0	0	—	—	—	—	—
1993–94	Dynamo Moscow	RUS	6	2	2	4	0	—	—	—	—	—
1993–94	Kansas City Blades	IHL	71	15	18	33	64	—	—	—	—	—
1993–94	San Jose Sharks	NHL	1	0	0	0	0	—	—	—	—	—
1994–95	Kansas City Blades	IHL	43	15	10	25	55	—	—	—	—	—
1994–95	San Jose Sharks	NHL	26	3	5	8	94	6	0	0	0	9
1995–96	Kansas City Blades	IHL	27	4	6	10	118	2	0	0	0	2
1995–96	San Jose Sharks	NHL	42	7	7	14	62	—	—	—	—	—
1996–97	Kentucky Thoroughblades	AHL	3	1	2	3	4	—	—	—	—	—
1996–97	San Jose Sharks	NHL	60	12	15	27	222	—	—	—	—	—
1997–98	San Jose Sharks	NHL	40	1	1	2	112	—	—	—	—	—
1997–98	Tampa Bay Lightning	NHL	14	1	1	2	58	—	—	—	—	—
1998–99	Tampa Bay Lightning	NHL	26	2	0	2	43	—	—	—	—	—
1998–99	Calgary Flames	NHL	36	5	9	14	30	—	—	—	—	—
1999–2000	Calgary Flames	NHL	76	10	22	32	78	—	—	—	—	—
2000–01	Mighty Ducks of Anaheim	NHL	16	1	0	1	29	—	—	—	—	—
2000–01	Boston Bruins	NHL	63	1	4	5	200	—	—	—	—	—
2001–02	Boston Bruins	NHL	47	0	2	2	164	—	—	—	—	—
2001–02	Phoenix Coyotes	NHL	30	6	3	9	51	3	0	0	0	2
2002–03	Phoenix Coyotes	NHL	59	3	0	3	135	—	—	—	—	—
2003–04	Phoenix Coyotes	NHL	33	1	2	3	125	—	—	—	—	—
2004–05	Metallurg Novokuznetsk	RSL	9	0	0	0	20	—	—	—	—	—
2004–05	Avangard Omsk	RSL	24	0	2	2	153	7	0	0	0	6
2005–06	Minnesota Wild	NHL	2	0	0	0	6	—	—	—	—	—
2005–06	Houston Aeros	AHL	1	0	0	0	0	—	—	—	—	—
NHL totals			571	53	71	124	1409	9	0	0	0	11

=== International ===
Year	Team	Event	Result	GP	G	A	Pts	PIM
1992	Russia	EJC	3rd place, bronze medalist(s)	6	3	1	4	12
1998	Russia	WC	5th	6	1	2	3	10
Senior totals				6	1	2	3	10

Awards and achievements
Preceded by Mike Rathje	San Jose Sharks first-round draft pick 1992	Succeeded by Viktor Kozlov
Preceded by Ari-Pekka Selin	Head coach of the Barys Astana; 2014–15	Succeeded by Yerlan Sagymbayev
