= Mikhail Panin =

Soviet ice hockey player (born 1961)

- Born: January 15, 1961 (age 65) Ust-Kamenogorsk, Kazakh SSR, Soviet Union
- Height: 5 ft 9 in (175 cm)
- Weight: 176 lb (80 kg; 12 st 8 lb)
- Position: Center
- Shot: Left
- Played for: Torpedo Ust-Kamenogorsk; CSKA Moscow; SKA Leningrad; Krylya Sovetov Moscow; PEV Weißwasser
- National team: Soviet Union
- NHL draft: Undrafted
- Playing career: 1978–1997

Mikhail Viktorovich Panin (Russian: Михаил Викторович Панин; born January 15, 1961) is a retired Soviet ice hockey center and Russian ice hockey coach. He was the head coach for Barys Astana during 2006–07 season. During his career he played for Torpedo Ust-Kamenogorsk, CSKA Moscow, SKA Leningrad, Krylya Sovetov Moscow and PEV Weißwasser. He also was a member of the Soviet Union national junior ice hockey team.

== International statistics ==
Year	Team	Event	Place	GP	G	A	Pts	PIM
1980	Soviet Union	WC	1st place, gold medalist(s)	5	1	3	4	0
1981	Soviet Union	CC	3rd place, bronze medalist(s)	5	3	3	6	6
Junior Int'l Totals				10	4	6	10	6
