= Galym Mambetaliyev =

Kazakh ice hockey player (1965-)

- Born: April 26, 1965; Temirtau, Kazakh SSR, Soviet Union
- Position: Forward
- Shot: Left
- Played for: Stroitel Karagandy; Neftyanik Almetyevsk; Bulat Temirtau; Mostovik Kurgan
- National team: Kazakhstan
- Playing career: 1980–2002

Galym Baubekuly Mambetaliyev (Kazakh: Ғалым Баубекұлы Мәмбеталиев, Ğalym Baubekūly Mämbetaliev; born April 4, 1965) is a former Kazakhstani professional ice hockey forward. He is currently an ice hockey coach, the head coach of Barys Astana.

== Coaching career ==
- 2002-2003 CSKA Temirtau - head coach
- 2004-2005 Barys Astana - head coach
- 2006-2008 HC Saryarka - head coach
- 2008-2009 Kazakhstan National Ice Hockey Team - head coach
- 2008-2010 Barys Astana - assistant coach
- 2010-2011 Barys Astana-2 - head coach
- 2011-2012 Snezhnye Barsy - head coach
- 2011-2012 Kazakhstan National Ice Hockey Team - assistant coach
- 2011-2012 Kazakhstan National U20 Ice Hockey Team - assistant coach
- 2013–2017 Snezhnye Barsy - head coach
- 2017-2018 Kazakhstan National Ice Hockey Team - head coach
- 2024-present Barys Astana - head coach
