= Mike Lundin =

American ice hockey player (born 1984)

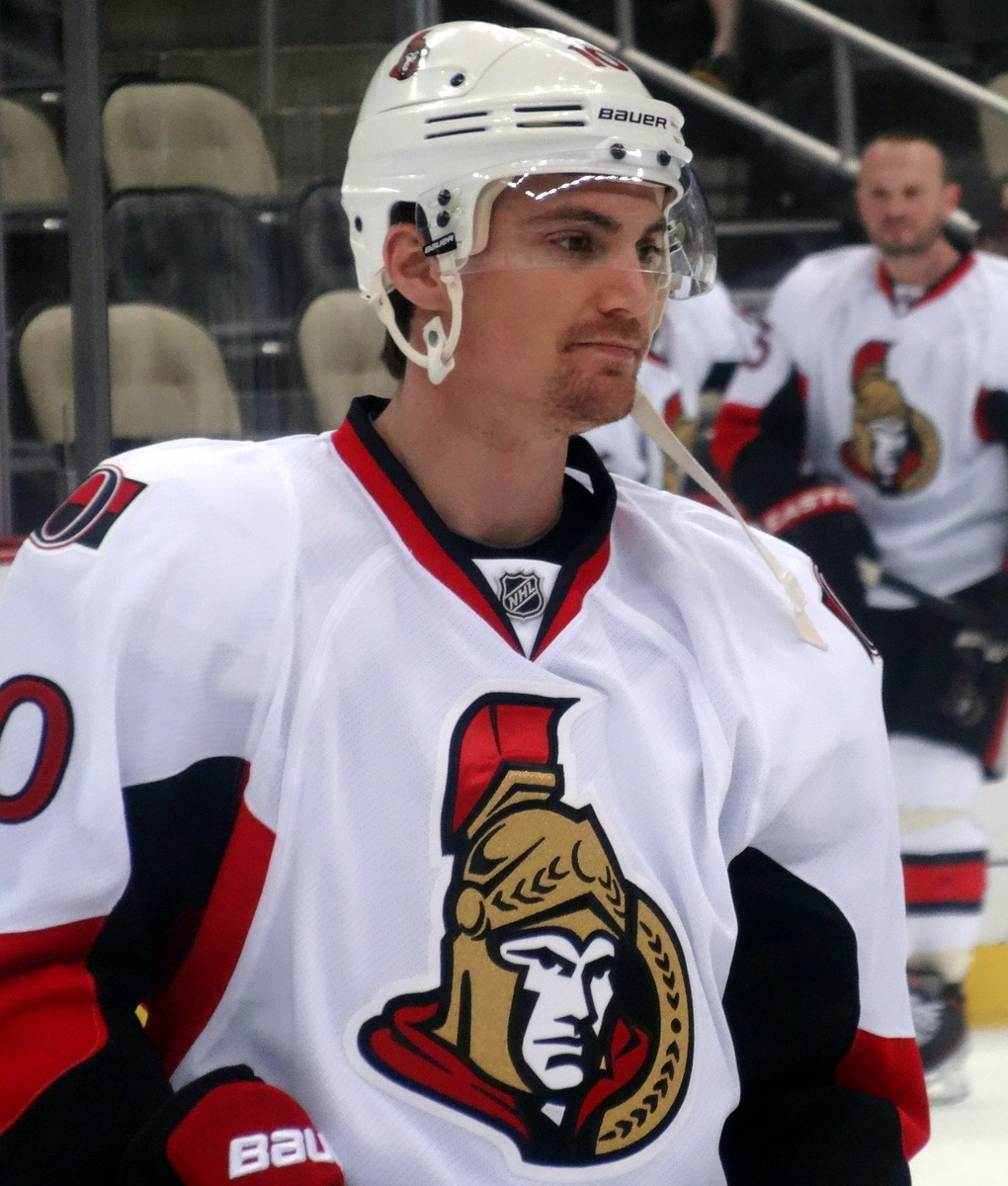
- Lundin with the Ottawa Senators in 2013
- Born: September 24, 1984 (age 42) Burnsville, Minnesota, U.S.
- Height: 6 ft 2 in (188 cm)
- Weight: 183 lb (83 kg; 13 st 1 lb)
- Position: Defense
- Shot: Left
- team Former teams: Free Agent; Tampa Bay Lightning; Minnesota Wild; Almtuna IS; Ottawa Senators; Barys Astana; EHC Biel; Jokerit
- National team: United States
- NHL draft: 102nd overall, 2004; Tampa Bay Lightning
- Playing career: 2007–2018

Michael Robert Lundin (born September 24, 1984) is an American professional ice hockey player, who is currently an unrestricted free agent. He has previously played in the National Hockey League (NHL) with the Ottawa Senators, Minnesota Wild, and Tampa Bay Lightning.

== Early life ==
Lundin was born in Burnsville, Minnesota, and attended Apple Valley High School (Minnesota) in Apple Valley, Minnesota, where he grew up. He graduated from the University of Maine. Lundin was a finalist for Minnesota Mr. Hockey award and earned All-Conference honors in both hockey and baseball. He was named the 2003 Associated Press’ Minnesota Hockey Player of the Year and Minnesota Star-Tribune Metro Hockey Player of the Year.

== Playing career ==
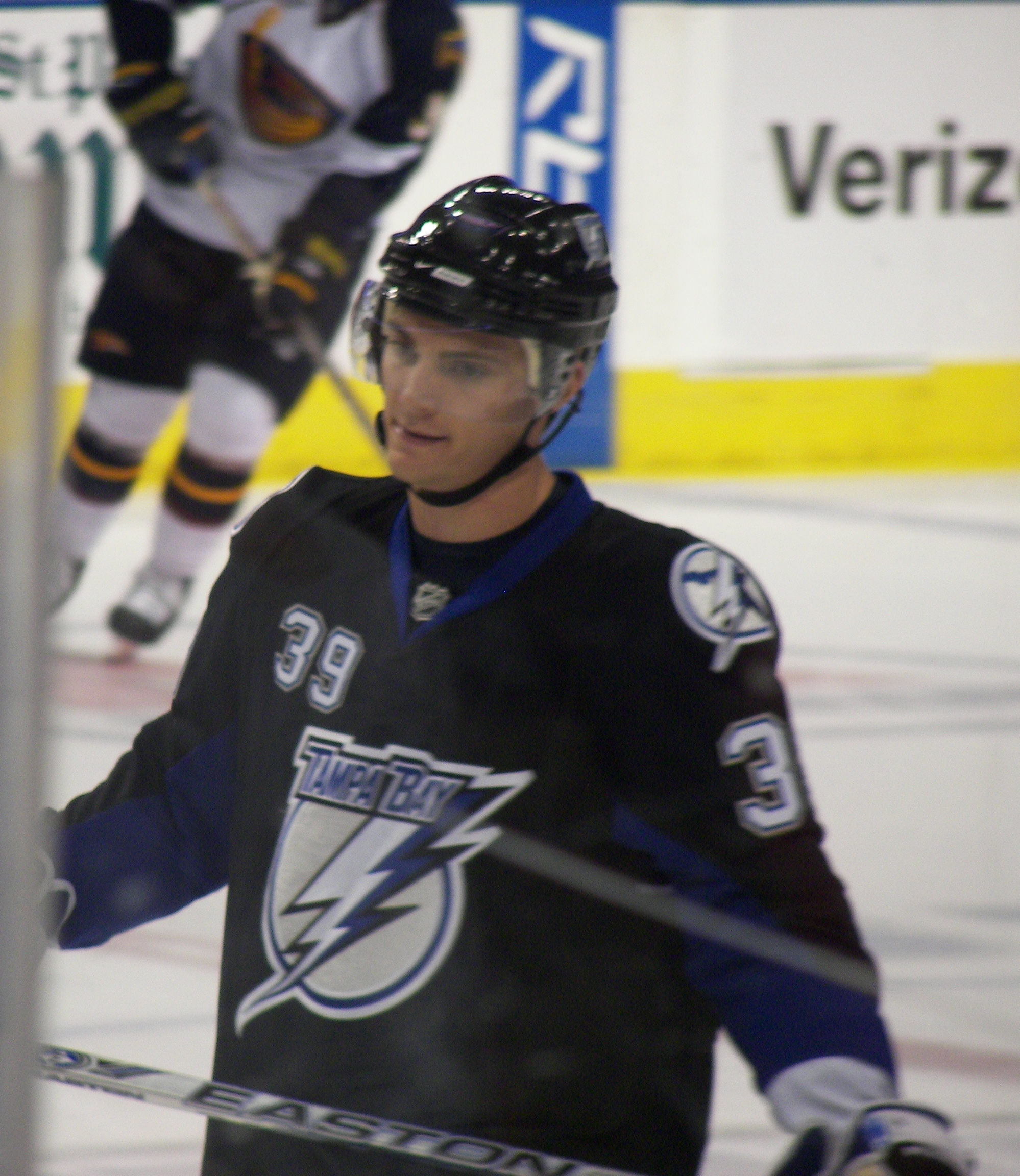
During his time with the Tampa Bay Lightning.

Lundin was drafted in the fourth round, 102nd overall selection, by the Tampa Bay Lightning in the 2004 NHL entry draft.

On July 9, 2011, Lundin signed a one-year, $1 million contract with the Minnesota Wild. During the 2011–12 season, due to injury and limited impact Lundin appeared in only 17 games with the Wild, registering 2 assists. He also made a brief appearance in rehabilitation for the Wild's AHL affiliate, the Houston Aeros.

On July 1, 2012, Lundin left the Wild organization and signed as a free agent to a one-year deal with the Ottawa Senators. He played in just 11 games with the Senators during the lockout-shortened 2012-13 season, recording a single assist as he battled various injuries.

On June 11, 2013, Lundin signed with Barys Astana of the Kontinental Hockey League, according to the team's website. He spent three years there.

On August 24, 2016, Lundin agreed to a one-year contract with EHC Biel of the National League A (NLA).

On April 27, 2017, Lundin signed a two-year deal with Jokerit of the KHL. Lundin had previously played in the KHL from 2013 to 2016. Lundin was limited through injury to just 23 games in the 2017–18 season.

Prior to his second season with Jokerit, Lundin announced he would not play the season due to continuing injury issues, effectively ending his tenure with the club.

== Career statistics ==
=== Regular season and playoffs ===
			Regular season					Playoffs
Season	Team	League	GP	G	A	Pts	PIM	GP	G	A	Pts	PIM
2001–02	Apple Valley High School	HSMN
2002–03	Apple Valley High School	HSMN	27	8	20	28		—	—	—	—	—
2003–04	University of Maine	HE	44	3	16	19	34	—	—	—	—	—
2004–05	University of Maine	HE	40	1	13	14	2	—	—	—	—	—
2005–06	University of Maine	HE	36	3	13	16	4	—	—	—	—	—
2006–07	University of Maine	HE	40	6	14	20	2	—	—	—	—	—
2007–08	Tampa Bay Lightning	NHL	81	0	6	6	16	—	—	—	—	—
2008–09	Tampa Bay Lightning	NHL	25	0	2	2	4	—	—	—	—	—
2008–09	Norfolk Admirals	AHL	51	4	25	29	18	—	—	—	—	—
2009–10	Tampa Bay Lightning	NHL	49	3	10	13	18	—	—	—	—	—
2010–11	Tampa Bay Lightning	NHL	69	1	11	12	12	18	0	2	2	2
2011–12	Minnesota Wild	NHL	17	0	2	2	4	—	—	—	—	—
2011–12	Houston Aeros	AHL	2	0	0	0	0	—	—	—	—	—
2012–13	Almtuna IS	Allsv	7	0	4	4	2	—	—	—	—	—
2012–13	Ottawa Senators	NHL	11	0	1	1	0	—	—	—	—	—
2013–14	Barys Astana	KHL	53	5	19	24	6	10	2	2	4	0
2014–15	Barys Astana	KHL	60	6	33	39	6	7	0	1	1	0
2015–16	Barys Astana	KHL	60	11	22	33	16	—	—	—	—	—
2016–17	EHC Biel	NLA	45	2	13	15	4	1	0	0	0	0
2017–18	Jokerit	KHL	23	0	0	0	2	—	—	—	—	—
2022	Team Fuhr	3ICE	9	0	4	4	—	—	—	—	—	—
2022	Team LeClair	3ICE	5	0	1	1	—	—	—	—	—	—
2023	Team Johnston	3ICE	8	3	2	5	—	—	—	—	—	—
NHL totals			252	4	32	36	54	18	0	2	2	2
KHL totals			196	22	74	96	30	17	2	3	5	0

=== International ===
Year	Team	Event	Result	GP	G	A	Pts	PIM
2010	United States	WC	13th	6	0	1	1	0
Senior totals				6	0	1	1	0

== Awards and honors ==
Award	Year
All-Hockey East Second Team	2006–07

Awards and achievements
Preceded by Danny O'Brien	Len Ceglarski Sportsmanship Award; 2006–07	Succeeded by Chris Higgins
