= Ari Ahonen =

Finnish ice hockey player (born 1981)

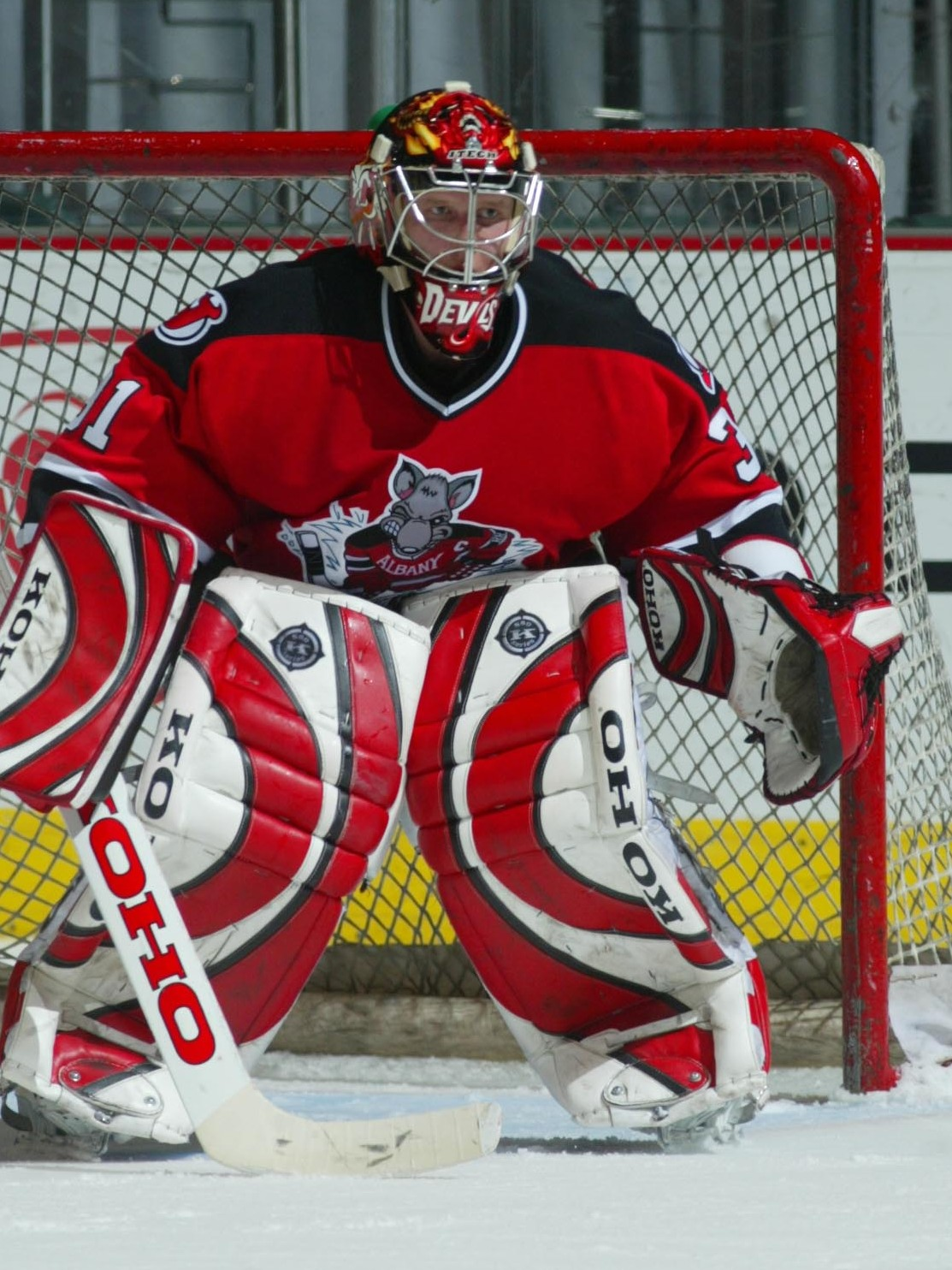
- Ahonen playing for the Albany River Rats in December 2003
- Born: February 6, 1981 (age 45) Jyväskylä, Finland
- Height: 6 ft 2 in (188 cm)
- Weight: 187 lb (85 kg; 13 st 5 lb)
- Position: Goaltender
- Caught: Left
- Played for: SM-liiga: JYP; HIFK; Espoo Blues; Jokerit; KalPa; Ässät; SHL: Frölunda HC; AHL: Albany River Rats; KHL: Metallurg Magnitogorsk; Barys Astana; Admiral Vladivostok
- National team: Finland
- NHL draft: 27th overall, 1999; New Jersey Devils
- Playing career: 1998–2018

Medal record

Representing Finland

World Junior Championships
Gold medal – first place	1999	Germany

Ari Ahonen (born February 6, 1981) is a Finnish former professional ice hockey goaltender. He was drafted in the first round, 27th overall, by the New Jersey Devils in the 1999 NHL entry draft. Ahonen is the only goaltender in SM-liiga history to have represented all three teams in the greater Helsinki area: HIFK, Jokerit and Blues.

== Playing career ==
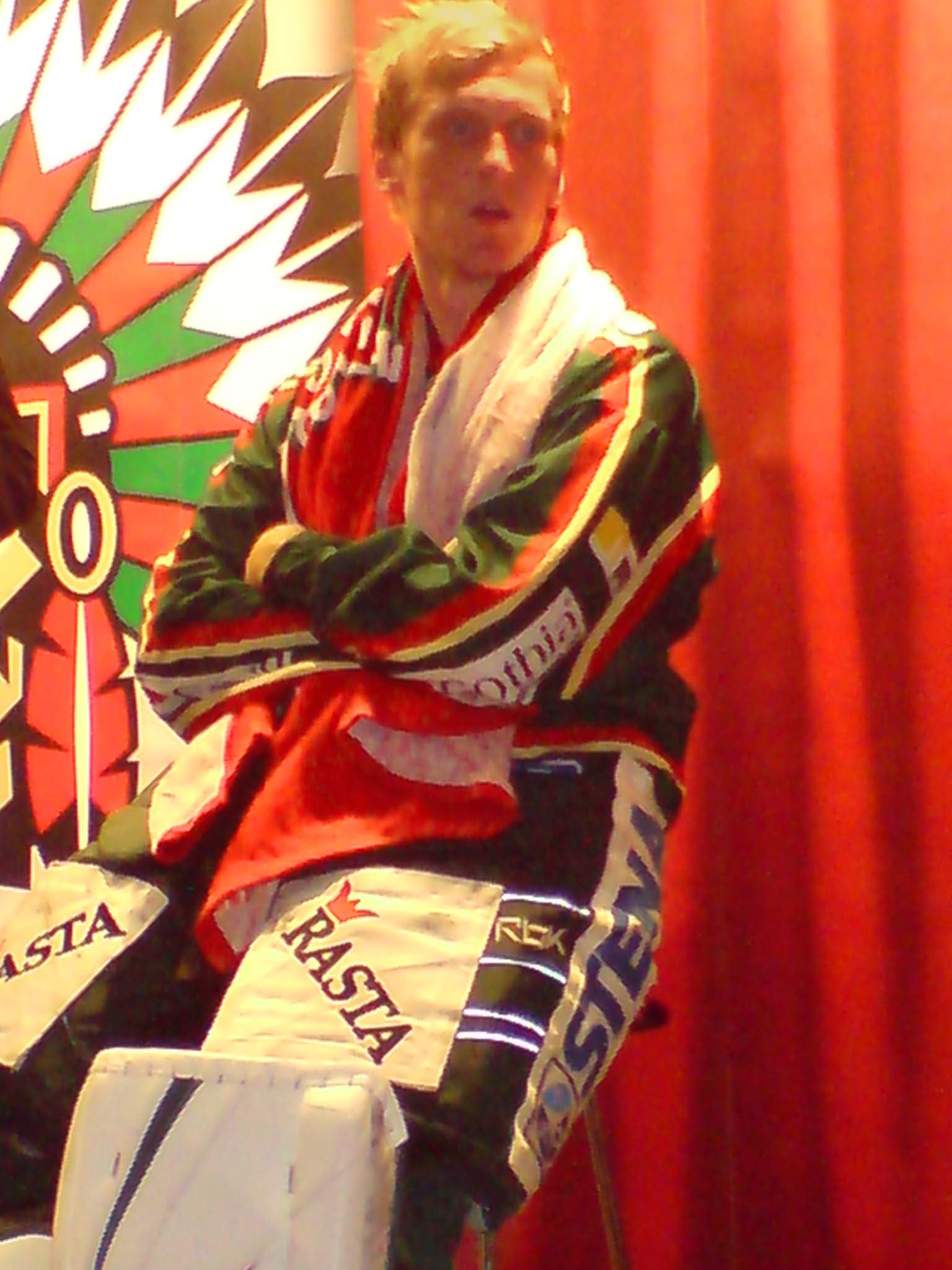
Ahonen in 2007

After playing three seasons in Finland's SM-liiga, representing JYP and HIFK, Ahonen joined the Devils' American Hockey League affiliate, the Albany River Rats. After five seasons with the River Rats, Ahonen returned to Finland in 2006 to represent Blues, but when he found himself serving as backup to Bernd Brückler, Ahonen signed with Jokerit when no less than three of their goaltenders were injured. With Jokerit Ahonen have won silver medals in 2007.

During the 2011–12 season Ahonen signed a two-year deal with Metallurg Magnitogorsk of the Kontinental Hockey League (KHL).

Ahonen later continued in the KHL, joining Kazakhstan based, Barys Astana, for the 2013–14 season.

== Career statistics ==
=== Regular season ===
Season	Team	League	GP	W	L	OTL	MIN	GA	SO	GAA	SV%
1998–99	JYP	SM-l	5
1999–00	HIFK	SM-l	38
2000–01	HIFK	SM-l	37	18	13	4	2101	97	2	2.77	.920
2001–02	Albany River Rats	AHL	36	6	22	6	2106	106	0	3.02	.914
2002–03	Albany River Rats	AHL	38	13	20	3	2171	110	1	3.04	.898
2003–04	Albany River Rats	AHL	50	13	30	6	3012	150	2	2.99	.902
2004–05	Albany River Rats	AHL	38	16	20	1	2195	114	4	3.12	.910
2005–06	Albany River Rats	AHL	16	3	13	0	949	63	0	3.98	.892
2006–07	Espoo Blues	SM-l	5	1	2	2	308.17	13	0	2.53	.922
2006–07	Jokerit	SM-l	20	9	6	5	1152.17	51	1	2.67	.914
2007–08	Frölunda HC	SHL	47	20	18	9	2737:27	116	4	2.47	.896
2008–09	Frölunda HC	SEL	14	4	4	0	503	24	1	2.86	.885
2009–10	KalPa	SM-l	43	21	10	9	2479:04	94	6	2.28	.903
2010–11	KalPa	SM-l	51	23	15	11	2986	106	5	2.13	.916
2011–12	KalPa	SM-l	18	13	2	3	1092:09	27	2	1.48	.945
2011–12	Metallurg Magnitogorsk	KHL	28	19	8	1	1581	57	3	2.16	.929
2012–13	Metallurg Magnitogorsk	KHL	40	20	13	6	2386	81	4	2.04	.924
2013–14	Barys Astana	KHL	36	19	12	5	2085	88	2	2.53	.914
2014–15	Admiral Vladivostok	KHL	5	1	4	0	254	21	0	4.96	.838
2015–16	Ässät	SM-I	21	8	8	3	1123	49	1	2.62	.906
2016–17	Ässät	SM-I	18	8	8	0	1005	41	1	2.45	.910
2017–18	Herning Blue Fox	Metal	32				1831			2.33	.911

== Awards and honours ==
Award	Year
IIHF World U18 Championships All-Star Team	1999

Awards and achievements
Preceded by Scott Gomez	New Jersey Devils first-round draft pick 1999	Succeeded by David Hale
