= Nikolai Myshagin =

Kazakhstani-Russian ice hockey coach (1955–2020)

- Born: 15 October 1955; Ust-Kamenogorsk, Kazakh SSR, USSR
- Died: 23 November 2020 (aged 65)
- Occupation: ice hockey coach

Nikolai Ivanovich Myshagin (Russian: Николай Иванович Мыша́гин; 15 October 1955 – 23 November 2020) was a Kazakhstani-Russian professional ice hockey coach.

== Career ==
He coached the Kazakhstan men's national ice hockey team at the 2006 Winter Olympics. Myshagin was the graduate of Ust-Kamenogorsk ice hockey school. He played only one season for Sputnik Almetyevsk in 1976. He is mostly known as an ice hockey coach. He was the honored coach of Kazakh SSR.

== Coaching career ==
- 1996–1997 Metallurg Novokuznetsk – head coach
- 1999–2000 Neftyanik Almetievsk – head coach
- 2000–2002 Barys Astana – head coach
- 2002–2006 Kazakhstan National Hockey Team – head coach
- 2002–2005 Kazzinc-Torpedo – head coach
- 2005–2007 Barys Astana – head coach
- 2007–2008 Yuzhny Ural Orsk – head coach
- 2009–2010 Primorie Ussuriysk – head coach
- 2011–2012 Izhstal Izhevsk – head coach
- 2012–2013 HC Tambov – head coach
- 2014–2015 Kazzinc-Torpedo – head coach
