= Anatoli Melikhov =

Kazakhstani ice hockey coach (1943–2024)

- Born: Anatoli Melikhov; 15 April 1943; Ust-Katav, Chelyabinsk Oblast, Russian SFSR, USSR
- Died: 30 September 2024 (aged 81)
- Occupation: ice hockey coach

Anatoli Mikhailovich Melikhov (Russian: Анатолий Михайлович Мелихов; 15 April 1943 – 30 September 2024) was a Kazakhstani professional ice hockey coach. He coached the Barys Astana in 2003–04 season. He also served as head coach of Kazakhstan men's national under-18 ice hockey team in 2004. Melikhov died on 30 September 2024, at the age of 81.
