= Vityaz Ice Hockey Center =

Indoor sporting arena in Chekhov, Russia

Coordinates: 55.1583°N 37.4619°E

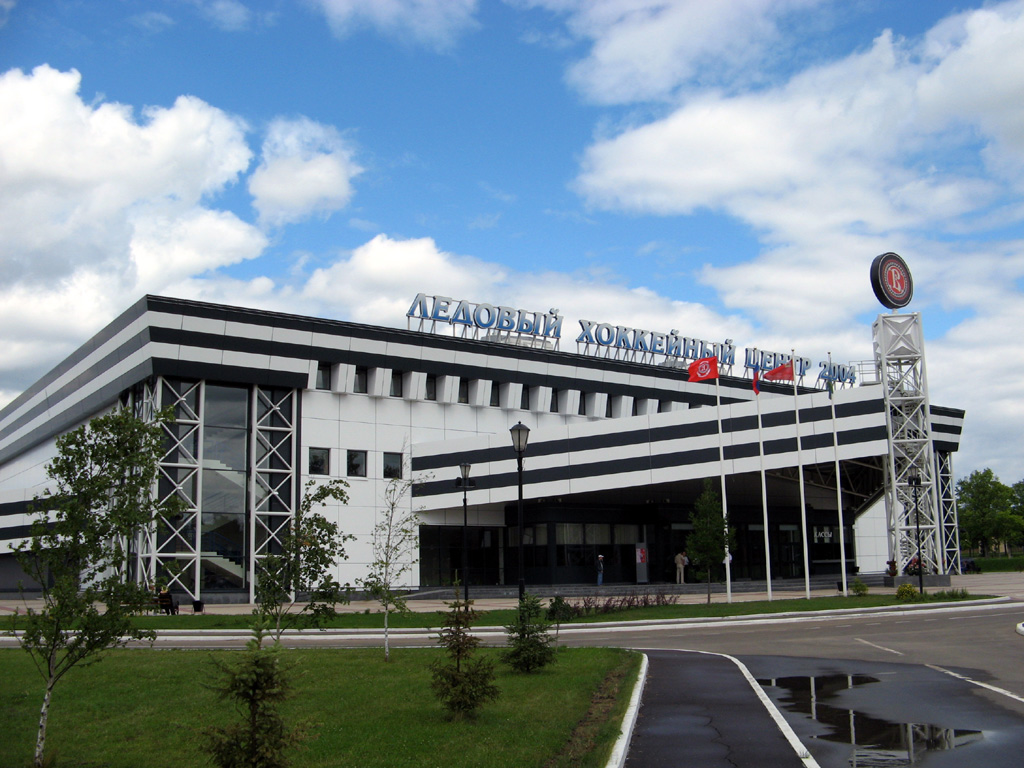
Vityaz Ice Hockey Center in 2007

Vityaz Ice Hockey Center (Russian: Ледовый хоккейный центр «Витязь»; also Ice Hockey Center 2004, Russian: Ледовый хоккейный центр 2004) is an indoor sporting arena located in Chekhov, Russia. The capacity of the arena is 3,300 (originally 1,370 until 2008), making it the smallest arena in the Kontinental Hockey League. It is the home arena of the Vityaz Chekhov ice hockey team of the Kontinental Hockey League.
