= Konstantin Glazachev =

Russian professional ice hockey forward (born 1985)

- Born: February 18, 1985 (age 41) Arkhangelsk, Soviet Union
- Height: 6 ft 0 in (183 cm)
- Weight: 186 lb (84 kg; 13 st 4 lb)
- Position: Left wing
- Shot: Right
- Played for: Lokomotiv Yaroslavl; Sibir Novosibirsk; Amur Khabarovsk; Metallurg Novokuznetsk; Barys Astana; HC Dinamo Minsk; Metallurg Magnitogorsk; Ak Bars Kazan; SKA Saint Petersburg; HC Ugra; Dynamo Moscow; Spartak Moscow; Admiral Vladivostok
- NHL draft: 35th overall, 2003; Nashville Predators
- Playing career: 2002–2020

Konstantin Aleksandrovich Glazachev (Russian: Константин Александрович Глазачев; born February 18, 1985) is a Russian former ice hockey forward. He most recently played for Admiral Vladivostok in the Kontinental Hockey League (KHL).

== Playing career ==
Glazachev moved to Yaroslavl at a young age and is a product of the HC Lokomotiv hockey system. The young player was also consistently a member of Russia's both U18 and U20 national squads. The young player was drafted by the Nashville Predators early in the second round with the 35th overall selection of the 2003 NHL entry draft. Since the draft he has consistently skated in the former Russian Super League and the current Kontinental Hockey League, but has struggled to build on the success he enjoyed earlier in his career.

== Career statistics ==
=== Regular season and playoffs ===
			Regular season					Playoffs
Season	Team	League	GP	G	A	Pts	PIM	GP	G	A	Pts	PIM
2001–02	Lokomotiv–2 Yaroslavl	RUS.3	25	9	10	19	20	—	—	—	—	—
2002–03	Lokomotiv Yaroslavl	RSL	13	3	4	7	4	4	0	0	0	0
2002–03	Lokomotiv–2 Yaroslavl	RUS.3	23	17	22	39	10	—	—	—	—	—
2003–04	Lokomotiv Yaroslavl	RSL	35	4	3	7	4	2	0	0	0	0
2003–04	Lokomotiv–2 Yaroslavl	RUS.3	13	8	5	13	22	—	—	—	—	—
2004–05	Lokomotiv Yaroslavl	RSL	9	0	3	3	2	—	—	—	—	—
2004–05	Lokomotiv–2 Yaroslavl	RUS.3	26	19	12	31	14	—	—	—	—	—
2004–05	Sibir Novosibirsk	RSL	24	4	9	13	6	—	—	—	—	—
2005–06	Lokomotiv Yaroslavl	RSL	29	7	4	11	8	9	0	2	2	0
2006–07	Lokomotiv Yaroslavl	RSL	15	4	1	5	10	—	—	—	—	—
2006–07	Lokomotiv–2 Yaroslavl	RUS.3	4	2	5	7	0	—	—	—	—	—
2006–07	Amur Khabarovsk	RSL	22	4	7	11	14	—	—	—	—	—
2007–08	Metallurg Novokuznetsk	RSL	50	7	9	16	10	—	—	—	—	—
2007–08	Metallurg–2 Novokuznetsk	RUS.3	2	5	2	7	2	—	—	—	—	—
2008–09	Barys Astana	KHL	56	28	24	52	30	3	3	0	3	2
2009–10	Barys Astana	KHL	42	16	17	33	18	2	0	0	0	0
2010–11	Dinamo Minsk	KHL	52	12	23	35	28	7	2	4	6	2
2011–12	Metallurg Magnitogorsk	KHL	18	3	7	10	6	—	—	—	—	—
2011–12	Ak Bars Kazan	KHL	27	3	5	8	10	6	0	1	1	0
2012–13	SKA St. Petersburg	KHL	6	0	1	1	4	—	—	—	—	—
2012–13	Sibir Novosibirsk	KHL	16	5	3	8	0	—	—	—	—	—
2012–13	HC Yugra	KHL	19	6	13	19	4	—	—	—	—	—
2013–14	Dynamo Moscow	KHL	32	9	5	14	12	2	0	0	0	0
2014–15	Dynamo Moscow	KHL	37	6	8	14	10	2	0	0	0	0
2015–16	Dynamo Moscow	KHL	3	1	1	2	0	—	—	—	—	—
2015–16	Spartak Moscow	KHL	41	15	16	31	18	—	—	—	—	—
2016–17	Spartak Moscow	KHL	40	7	11	18	10	—	—	—	—	—
2017–18	Admiral Vladivostok	KHL	22	1	1	2	20	—	—	—	—	—
2018–19	Admiral Vladivostok	KHL	54	16	12	28	8	—	—	—	—	—
2019–20	Admiral Vladivostok	KHL	57	10	5	15	14	—	—	—	—	—
RSL totals			197	33	40	73	58	15	0	2	2	0
KHL totals			522	138	152	290	192	22	5	5	10	4

=== International ===
Year	Team	Event	Result	GP	G	A	Pts	PIM
2003	Russia	WJC18	3rd place, bronze medalist(s)	6	2	3	5	20
Junior totals				6	2	3	5	20
