= Kevin Dallman =

Kazakhstani ice hockey player

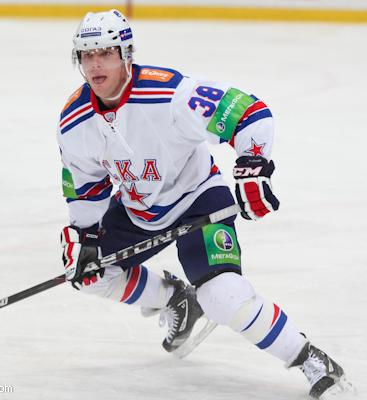
- Dallman with SKA Saint Petersburg in 2012.
- Born: February 26, 1981 (age 44); Niagara Falls, Ontario, Canada
- Height: 5 ft 11 in (180 cm)
- Weight: 195 lb (88 kg; 13 st 13 lb)
- Position: Defence
- Shot: Right
- Played for: Boston Bruins; St. Louis Blues; Los Angeles Kings; Barys Astana; SKA Saint Petersburg
- National team: Kazakhstan
- NHL draft: Undrafted
- Playing career: 2002–2019

Kevin Jonathan Dallman (Kazakh: Кевин Даллмэн; born February 26, 1981) is a Canadian-Kazakhstani former professional ice hockey defenceman. He most recently played for Barys Astana of the Kontinental Hockey League (KHL).

== Playing career ==
As a youth, Dallman played in the 1995 Quebec International Pee-Wee Hockey Tournament with a minor ice hockey team from Niagara Falls, Ontario.

Undrafted, Dallman signed his first professional contract with the Boston Bruins on July 18, 2002, after a successful junior career with Guelph Storm of the Ontario Hockey League. After spending three years with Boston's AHL affiliate the Providence Bruins, Dallman made his debut for the Bruins in the 2005–06 season.

Dallman played 21 games for the Bruins before he was claimed off waivers by the St. Louis Blues on December 5, 2005. After a solid performance with the Blues, Dallman signed as a free agent for the Los Angeles Kings to a two-year contract on July 10, 2006.

After two years in the Kings organization Dallman left for Europe, signing with Barys Astana of the newly formed Kontinental Hockey League on July 24, 2008. He became an offensive leader with Barys Astana, leading the KHL in scoring among defenseman with 28 goals and 30 assists for 58 points in 53 games.

Dallman became a Kazakhstani citizen in 2010 and joined the national team. His first IIHF tournament for Kazakhstan was the final Olympic qualifying tournament in Riga.

On May 18, 2012 Barys Astana team managers refused to extend Dallman's contract. "We have agreed with his agent that if the team fulfills its task and reaches the final of the tournament, we will return to discussing the contract's extension. However the team did not reach the final and Dallman did not show his best skills in the playoffs. The issue in question was whether to extend his contract or not. Dallman asked for a four-year extension with significant compensation demands. That is why the decision was made not to extend the contract," Barys president Nurlan Orazbayev said. Dallman signed a two-year contract with SKA Saint Petersburg on May 31, 2012. In May 2014 he returned to Barys Astana, signing a three-year contract.

On August 5, 2019, Dallman announced retirement from the KHL after 11 years in the KHL.

== Personal ==
His uncle, Marty Dallman, played six games for the Toronto Maple Leafs in the late 1980s and played for Austria at the 1994 Winter Olympics.

== Career statistics ==
=== Regular season and playoffs ===
			Regular season					Playoffs
Season	Team	League	GP	G	A	Pts	PIM	GP	G	A	Pts	PIM
1996–97	Niagara Falls Canucks	GHL	3	0	1	1	2	—	—	—	—	—
1997–98	Niagara Falls Canucks	GHL	47	13	25	38	43	11	2	4	6	0
1998–99	Guelph Storm	OHL	68	8	30	38	52	11	1	4	5	2
1999–2000	Guelph Storm	OHL	67	13	46	59	38	6	0	2	2	11
2000–01	Guelph Storm	OHL	66	25	52	77	88	1	0	0	0	0
2001–02	Guelph Storm	OHL	67	23	63	86	68	9	8	8	16	22
2002–03	Providence Bruins	AHL	72	2	19	21	53	—	—	—	—	—
2003–04	Providence Bruins	AHL	65	6	23	29	44	2	0	0	0	0
2004–05	Providence Bruins	AHL	71	8	26	34	48	17	4	6	10	20
2005–06	Boston Bruins	NHL	21	0	1	1	8	—	—	—	—	—
2005–06	St. Louis Blues	NHL	46	4	9	13	21	—	—	—	—	—
2006–07	Los Angeles Kings	NHL	53	1	9	10	12	—	—	—	—	—
2006–07	Manchester Monarchs	AHL	3	4	0	4	4	—	—	—	—	—
2007–08	Los Angeles Kings	NHL	34	3	4	7	4	—	—	—	—	—
2007–08	Manchester Monarchs	AHL	5	1	4	5	2	—	—	—	—	—
2008–09	Barys Astana	KHL	53	28	30	58	117	3	0	1	1	8
2009–10	Barys Astana	KHL	55	14	27	41	90	—	—	—	—	—
2010–11	Barys Astana	KHL	53	12	27	39	40	4	0	2	2	6
2011–12	Barys Astana	KHL	53	18	36	54	33	7	1	2	3	2
2012–13	SKA Saint Petersburg	KHL	52	15	23	38	18	15	4	9	13	4
2013–14	SKA Saint Petersburg	KHL	29	5	4	9	18	10	2	7	9	4
2014–15	Barys Astana	KHL	47	14	19	33	39	7	0	2	2	12
2015–16	Barys Astana	KHL	60	8	32	40	16	—	—	—	—	—
2016–17	Barys Astana	KHL	60	9	24	33	40	10	0	6	6	0
2017–18	Barys Astana	KHL	53	7	24	31	37	—	—	—	—	—
2018–19	Barys Astana	KHL	49	5	14	19	20	—	—	—	—	—
AHL totals			216	21	72	93	151	19	4	6	10	20
NHL totals			154	8	23	31	45	—	—	—	—	—
KHL totals			564	135	260	395	488	56	7	29	36	36

=== International ===
Year	Team	Event	Result	GP	G	A	Pts	PIM
2013	Kazakhstan	OGQ	DNQ	3	0	3	3	2
2014	Kazakhstan	WC	16th	7	0	6	6	0
2015	Kazakhstan	WC D1A	17th	4	3	3	6	0
2016	Kazakhstan	OGQ	DNQ	3	1	1	2	2
2017	Kazakhstan	WC D1A	19th	5	2	1	3	2
2018	Kazakhstan	WC D1A	19th	5	0	2	2	4
Senior totals				27	6	16	22	10
