= Nurlan Orazbayev =

Kazakh ice hockey player

- Born: 5 June 1968 (age 58) Karagandy, Kazakh SSR, Soviet Union
- Height: 6 ft 0 in (183 cm)
- Weight: 216 lb (98 kg; 15 st 6 lb)
- Position: Forward
- Played for: Avtomobilist Karagandy; Bulat Temirtau; Barys Astana
- Playing career: 1985–1996

Nurlan Sairanuly Orazbayev (Kazakh: Нұрлан Сайранұлы Оразбаев, romanized: Nūrlan Sairanūly Orazbaev; born 5 June 1968) is a former Kazakh professional ice hockey player, who played for Avtomobilist Karagandy, Bulat Temirtau and Barys Astana. Orazbayev served as a president of the KHL team Barys Astana from 2006 to 2012 and 2013 to 2015.
