= Alexander Vysotsky =

Kazakhstani ice hockey player

- Born: July 24, 1968; Karagandy, Kazakh SSR, USSR
- Height: 5 ft 9 in (175 cm)
- Weight: 181 lb (82 kg; 12 st 13 lb)
- Position: Forward
- Shot: Left
- Played for: Avtomobilist Karagandy; Dizel Penza; Neman Grodno; Tivali Minsk; Yuzhny Ural Orsk; Kazakhmys Karagandy; Barys Astana
- National team: Kazakhstan
- Playing career: 1985–2006

Alexander Anatolyevich Vysotsky (Russian: Александр Анатольевич Высоцкий, born July 24, 1968) is a former Kazakhstani professional ice hockey player, who played for Kazakhstan National Hockey Team. Vysotsky is the graduate of Karagandy ice hockey school. He is the former head coach of Barys Astana and HC Almaty.

== Coaching career ==
- 2006-2007 Saryarka Karagandy - assistant coach
- 2007 Barys Astana - assistant coach
- 2007-2009 Barys Astana - head coach
- 2009-2010 Kazakhstan national ice hockey team - assistant coach
- 2010-2013 HC Almaty - head coach
- 2013–present Nomad Astana - head coach
