= Andrei Shayanov =

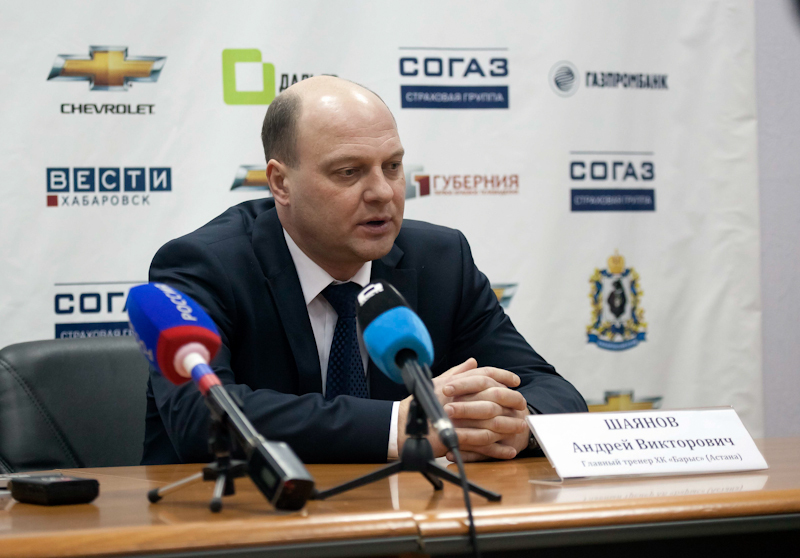
- Andrei Shayanov after Amur-Barys game in 2011
- Born: June 1, 1968 (age 57) Ust-Kamenogorsk, Kazakh SSR, Soviet Union
- Played for: Torpedo Ust-Kamenogorsk; SKA Novosibirsk; Stroitel Temirtau
- NHL draft: Undrafted
- Playing career: 1985–1987

Andrei Viktorovich Shayanov (Russian: Андрей Викторович Шая́нов, born June 1, 1968) is a Kazakhstani-Russian professional ice hockey coach. He currently serves as assistant coach at Barys Astana of the Kontinental Hockey League. Shayanov was the head coach of the Kazakhstan men's national ice hockey team at the 2010 and 2012 IIHF World Championship.

== Coaching career ==
=== Hockey School ===
Andrei Shayanov had started his career in a hockey school "Torpedo" in Ust'-Kamenogorsk, Kazakhstan as a trainer-teacher in 1991. He had worked there until he moved to Russian hockey school "Metallurg" in Magnitogorsk in 1998, also as a trainer-teacher of juniors of 1986 year of born. In 2005 he got raised to head coach of “Metallurg-2”, Magnitogorsk. At the same time Shayanov had headed youth’s regional team “Ural-Western Siberia”, Russian youth’s national team and Russian junior’s national team.

=== Continental Hockey League ===
In the 2009-2012 seasons he took over Barys Astana in KHL and headed the team to the play-off.
