= Vladimir Krikunov =

Soviet and Russian ice hockey player and coach

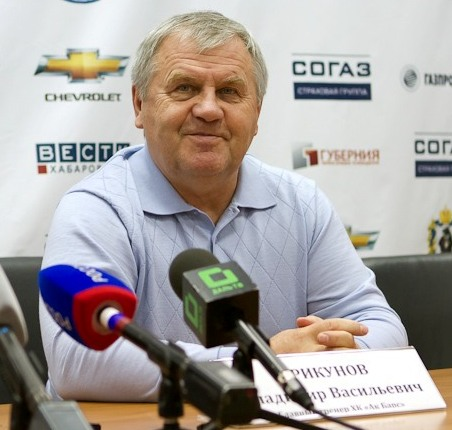
- Born: March 24, 1950 (age 75); Kirovo-Chepetsk, Soviet Union
- Height: 5 ft 7 in (170 cm)
- Weight: 170 lb (77 kg; 12 st 2 lb)
- Position: Defence
- Shot: Left
- Played for: Kristall Saratov; Krylya Sovetov Moscow; Dinamo Riga
- National team: Soviet Union
- Playing career: 1972–1984

Vladimir Vasilievich Krikunov (Russian: Владимир Васильевич Крикунов, born March 24, 1950) is retired Soviet and Russian ice hockey player and former head coach of team Russia. He is currently a coach of the KHL club Dinamo Riga. As a player Krikunov played for Dinamo Riga and Krylya Sovetov Moscow. During his coaching career he coached Dynamo Moscow and Team Russia. He won Russian championships as a coach in 2004/2005 season, bronze medal at world championships and lead Russian team in 2006 winter olympics.

== Coaching career ==
Vladimir Krikunov began as an assistant coach at HC Dinamo Minsk. During his coaching career, Krikunov worked with such ice hockey clubs as Ak Bars Kazan, Barys Astana ve HC Neftekhimik Nizhnekamsk. He also worked as a coach with national teams of Russia, Slovenia, Belarus, Latvia and Kazakhstan.

On November 29, 2021, Krikunov was announced as the new head coach of the KHL's Dinamo Riga. After Russia's invasion of Ukraine, Dinamo Riga left the KHL and Krikunov is no longer listed as the team's head coach, having been replaced by Mareks Jass.

Sporting positions
| Preceded by Andrei Shayanov | Head coach of the Barys Astana; 2012–13 | Succeeded by Ari-Pekka Selin |
