= Barys Astana =

- Nickname: "Snow Leopards"
- City: Astana, Kazakhstan
- League: KHL
- Conference: Eastern
- Division: Chernyshev
- Founded: 26 November 1999; 26 years ago
- Home arena: Barys Arena (capacity: 11,578)
- Colours
- Owners: Kazakhstan Temir Zholy (Askar Mamin, chairman)
- President: Nurlan Orazbayev
- General manager: Oleg Bolyakin
- Head coach: Mikhail Kravets
- Captain: Kirill Savitski
- Affiliates: Nomad Astana (KAZ); Snezhnye Barsy (MHL)
- Website: hcbarys.kz

Franchise history
- 1999–present: HC Barys

Hockey Club Barys (Kazakh: Барыс хоккей клубы, romanized: Barys hokkei kluby; Russian: Хоккейный клуб Барыс, romanized: Khokkeynyy klub Barys), also referred to as Barys Astana or HC Barys, is a professional ice hockey club based in Astana, Kazakhstan. It is a member of the Chernyshev Division in the Kontinental Hockey League (KHL).

It is one of the founding members of the KHL. The club's home arena is the Barys Arena, where it have played since the 2015–16 KHL season. Prior to 2015, the team played home games at the Kazakhstan Sports Palace for 14 seasons, beginning in 2001. The head coach is Galym Mambetaliyev and the president is Nurlan Orazbayev. The team serves as a base club for the Kazakhstan national ice hockey team.

The club was founded in 1999 as a member of the Kazakhstan Hockey Championship. In 10 seasons of the national competition, Barys has won two Championships in 2007–08 and 2008–09. In 2004, Barys was admitted into the Russian ice hockey system, joining its third tier the Pervaya Liga. Their win in Ural-Western Siberia Zone in 2007, led to their promotion to the Vysshaya Liga. After a single season of play in the Vysshaya Liga, Barys joined the newly formed Kontinental Hockey League in 2008.

== History ==
=== 1999–2008: early years ===
Barys was founded on 26 November 1999 as the result of a resolution adopted by the City Council of Astana. The team was gathered in a semi-professional level by enthusiast players who were annually playing an amateur tournament for the prize of Mayor of Astana and professional players who came from other teams of the Championship. The team's name, Barys, is derived from the national symbol of Kazakhstan, translated as snow leopard. Nikolai Myshagin became the first head coach in the club's history. Under Myshagin rule, Barys earned silver medals in its first three season of play in the Kazakhstan Hockey Championship. Barys would stay there until 2009. During the 2003–04 season, Barys squaded by junior players to serve as a base club for the Kazakhstan national junior ice hockey team. In 2004, Barys was admitted into the Russian ice hockey system. They made their debut in the Pervaya Liga; in parallel, Barys kept a second team in the Kazakhstan Hockey Championship. Barys' debut in Russia was interesting, with the team doing fairly well. They played three seasons in the Pervaya Liga, where they finished respectively third, second and first of the Ural-Western Siberia Zone where they played. With this first place in 2007, Barys was allowed into the Vysshaya Liga.

League history

Kazakhstan Hockey Championship 1999–2009
Pervaya Liga 2004–2007
Vysshaya Liga 2007–2008
Kontinental Hockey League 2008–present

Barys played a single season in the Vysshaya Liga, a good one, where they finished second out of 14 in the Eastern Conference. They reached the playoffs, where they began by sweeping HC Belgorod in three straight games in the first round, before falling to Khimik Voskresensk in four games. Barys however won the Kazakhstan Hockey Championship that year. Barys' main team did not participate in the regular season of the league (however, its affiliate, Barys-2, did), but the league's format was so that the three best team of the league after the regular season would play the three best Kazakh teams (Barys' main team, Kazzinc-Torpedo and Kazakhmys Satpaev, all three were playing in the Vysshaya Liga) in the final round. Barys won the tournament, dethroning defending champions Kazzinc-Torpedo, en route to their first Kazakhstan Hockey Championship title.

=== 2008–2011: first seasons in the KHL ===
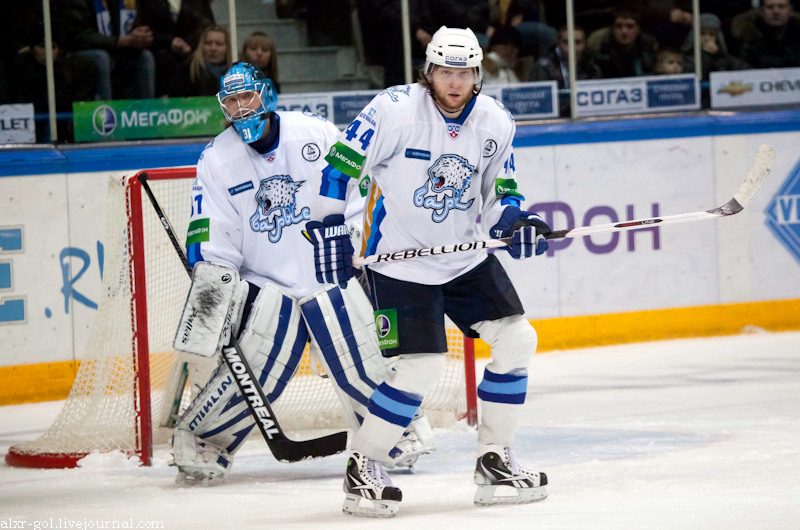
Vitali Yeremeyev and Jonas Junland during the game against Amur in 2011

In 2008, Barys applied to join the newly formed Kontinental Hockey League. The league's authorities allowed Barys in, making it the first Kazakh team to join the new league. The team won its first game in the KHL on 3 September 2008, abroad, defeating Neftekhimik Nizhnekamsk 2–1 in the shootouts. They registered their first home game eleven days later by beating defending Russian champions Salavat Yulaev Ufa 3–2, this time again in shootout. The team finished its first season with a 15th place overall in the league. Barys secured a spot in the playoffs on 26 February 2009, defeating 6-4 Vityaz Chekhov in the last day of the regular season. In the first round of Gagarin Cup playoffs, Barys faced Ak Bars Kazan. Kazan swept Astana three games to nothing to advance to the second round. Kevin Dallman finished the season as the league's fifth best scorer with 28 goals and 30 assists (58 points) record; he also finished as the league's leader for shots on goal with 217. Konstantin Glazachev finished ninth overall in the league in scoring with 52 points. Meanwhile, the team secured a second straight Kazakhstan Hockey Championship title.

The 2009–10 season saw Barys have a very similar season than the previous. Veteran Jozef Stümpel finished top scorer of the team, with 52 points, two better than Maxim Spiridonov, who was the best goal scorer of the team with 24. Fan favourite Kevin Dallman also was a major contributor, with 14 goals and 27 assists. Newcomer Jeff Glass did a fine job between the pipes, with 19 wins and a 2.87 goals against average, helping the team finish fourteenth overall of the KHL, a one place improvement from 2008 to 2009. Barys was however once again swept in three games by Ak Bars Kazan in the first round of the playoffs. Barys opened 2010–11 season with Andrei Khomutov as the new head coach. However, the team's previous manager Andrei Shayanov remained in the team as an assistant coach. The team compiled a 20–21–4–9 regular season record with 77 points. As the seventh seed of the Eastern Conference, Barys faced Ak Bars Kazan in the first round of playoffs, again. Ak Bars won series without losing a game 4–0.

=== 2011–2017: BBD line years ===
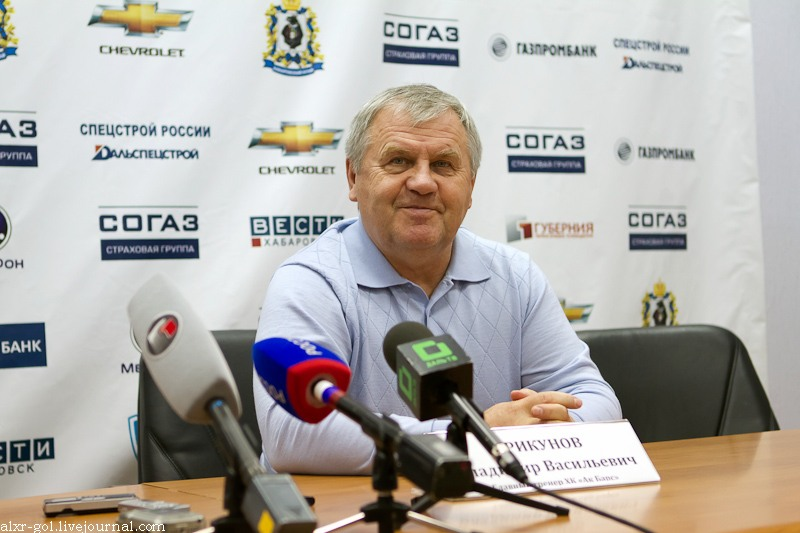
Vladimir Krikunov coached Barys during the 2012–13 KHL season

In the 2011 off-season, Barys announced the signing of Dustin Boyd and Nigel Dawes, who later formed BBD (Bochenski–Boyd–Dawes) line along with Brandon Bochenski. In the beginning of the 2011–12 season, Barys fired Andrei Khomutov after seven losses in eight games. Andrei Shayanov replaced him and led the team to sixth place in the Eastern Conference. Barys fell in the Eastern Conference Quarterfinals to the third seeded Metallurg Magnitogorsk in seven games.

During the 2012–13 NHL lockout, Barys strengthened by signing Ryan McDonagh, Victor Hedman and Nik Antropov. Vladimir Krikunov appointed as a new head coach. Barys finished the season with a 23–18–5–6 record for 85 points. In the first round of the 2013 Gagarin Cup playoffs, Barys was defeated by Traktor Chelyabinsk 3–4 in series. After the season, Krikunov decided to leave the team, because he refused to coach the Kazakhstan national ice hockey team in parallel with Barys.

In the 2013 off-season, Barys appointed Ari-Pekka Selin as a new head coach. On 4 July 2013, Barys officially joined to newly created Astana Presidential Sports Club, the organization supported by Sovereign Wealth Fund Samruk-Kazyna to combine the main sports teams in Astana. Having resigned most of their free agents, the club wouldn't much change in the 2013 off-season, with the exception of losing UFAs Vadim Krasnoslobodtsev, Vitali Novopashin and Mikhail Grigoriev. On 19 June 2013, the team signed goalie Ari Ahonen for one year. Barys strengthened defense, signing Mike Lundin, Maxim Semyonov and Evgeni Blokhin. On 8 August 2013, unrestricted free agent Nik Antropov signed with the Barys a two-year deal. In its season opening game on 8 September 2013, Barys defeated Severstal Cherepovets 10–1. During the season, Barys signed a season long contracts with Cam Barker and Zach Hamill. Barys's Brandon Bochenski and Talgat Zhailauov selected to play in the 2014 KHL All-Star Game, as the result of fans and journalists voting. Barys finished as the second seed in the Eastern Conference. Recording 26 wins, 18 losses, 6 overtime/shootout wins and 4 overtime/shootout losses, they finished with 94 points for the regular season. In the first round of the 2014 Gagarin Cup playoffs, Barys defeated Avtomobilist Yekaterinburg 4–0 in series to overcome the first round for the first time in its KHL history. Barys lost to Salavat Yulaev Ufa in Eastern Conference semifinals 2–4 in series.

On May 5, 2014, it was announced that former long-time Barys's captain Kevin Dallman signed a three-year contract. On 18 June 2014, the KHL reported that Andrei Nazarov would move from Donbass Donetsk to become the new head coach at Barys, replacing Ari-Pekka Selin who had been sacked as coach of the Kazakhstan national ice hockey team on 11 June.

== Arenas ==
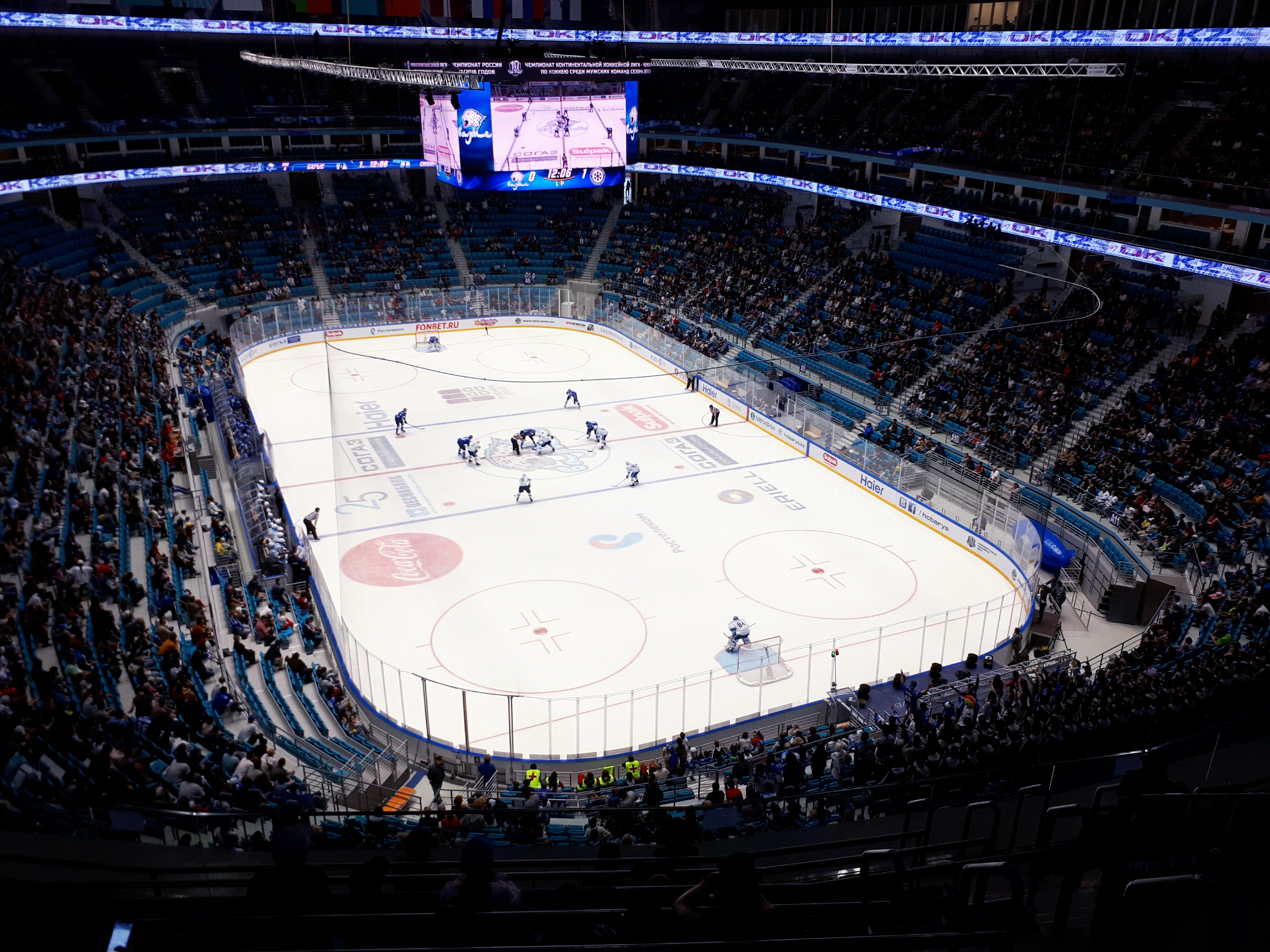
Barys Arena, current home of Barys

At the time Barys was formed, the Kazakhstan Sports Palace just began construction. The lack of hockey rinks in Astana, forced Barys to relocate temporarily. During the first two seasons of its existence, the team was based at the arenas of Temirtau, Almaty and Oskemen. The Kazakhstan Sports Palace was opened on 6 March 2001 by the President of Kazakhstan Nursultan Nazarbayev with a game against Yesil Petropavlovsk. It seats 4,070 in the hockey arena. In September 2011, league's authorities considered Kazakhstan Sports Palace the worst in the league. The main reason was the regrettably little capacity. Later, the team's owner Kazakhstan Temir Zholy decided to build the new 11,578 seat Barys Arena, which was opened in 2015.

== Team identity ==
=== Logo and jersey design ===
The team colours are navy, sky blue, gold and white, representing the Flag of Kazakhstan. The team logo is officially the head of a snow leopard, most recently updated in 2022. Within the leopard, there are hidden symbols representing some of Astana's famous monuments, such as the Palace of Peace and Reconciliation and the Hazrat Sultan Mosque, as well as the Barys Arena sports complex. The jerseys, also introduced in 2022, have the same design, with the home jerseys being navy blue, with gold and white striping on the sleeves, socks and the bottom of the jersey, representing the traditional "koshkar-muiz", a pattern found on the Kazakh flag. The away jerseys are white, with gold and navy blue striping, also on the sleeves, socks and the bottom of the jersey. The Kazakh flag is on the left shoulder on both jerseys.

=== Mascot ===
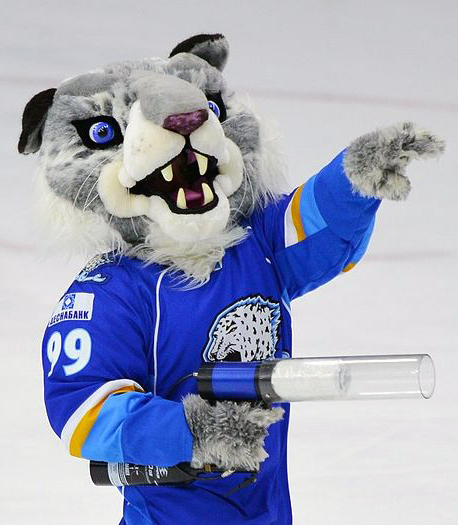
Barsik throws T-shirts to the fans during the game

The team mascot is Barsik, an anthropomorphic snow leopard. Barsik wears a Barys jersey with his name on the back, and the numbers "99". He keeps the crowd excited, signs autographs, participates in entertainment during the intermissions, skates across the ice, throws T-shirts, and runs throughout the aisles of the arena to high five fans. Prior to the Mascots Contest at the 2014 KHL All-Star Game, Barsik changed his skin feature to look more snowy, while previous was looked more leopard.

== The rivalry with Ak Bars Kazan ==
Barys's biggest rival in the Kontinental Hockey League is Ak Bars Kazan. The rivalry between the teams is often referred to as Cat Derby among fans and media. Both teams have the same name meaning snow leopard. Barys is a Kazakh mountain snow leopard, the Ak Bars is the same leopard but the Tatar team emphasised "white" by adding "ak" in front, secondly, the team logos resemble each other. The teams played in the first playoff round of the first three KHL seasons, and Ak Bars defeated Barys every year without losing a game.

== Season-by-season record ==
This is a partial list of the previous five seasons completed by Barys Astana. For the full season-by-season history, see List of Barys Astana seasons.

Note: GP = Games played, W = Wins, L = Losses, OTW = Overtime/shootout wins, OTL = Overtime/shootout losses, Pts = Points, GF = Goals for, GA = Goals against

Season	GP	W	L	OTW	OTL	Pts	GF	GA	Finish	Playoffs
2021–22	47	14	21	8	4	48	127	138	4th, Chernyshev	Lost in Conference Quarterfinals, 1–4 (Metallurg Magnitogorsk)
2022–23	68	20	34	7	7	61	153	194	6th, Chernyshev	Did not qualify
2023–24	68	12	39	9	8	50	137	205	6th, Chernyshev	Did not qualify
2024–25	68	8	47	6	7	35	99	227	6th, Chernyshev	Did not qualify
2025–26	68	16	35	5	12	54	154	208	5th, Chernyshev	Did not qualify

== Players and personnel ==
=== Current roster ===
Updated 1 October 2026.

No.	Nat	Player	Pos	S/G	Age	Acquired	Birthplace
10	(Kazakhstan)	Abzal Alibek	F	L	20	2026	Astana, Kazakhstan
96	(Kazakhstan)	Alikhan Asetov	RW	L	30	2015	Ust-Kamenogorsk, Kazakhstan
8	(United States)	Justin Bailey	RW	R	31	2026	Buffalo, New York, United States
87	(Kazakhstan)	Adil Beketayev	D	L	28	2021	Petropavlovsk, Kazakhstan
7	(Kazakhstan)	Damir Britikov	D	L	19	2026	Temirtau, Kazakhstan
71	(Kazakhstan)	Samat Daniyar (A)	D	R	27	2019	Astana, Kazakhstan
26	(United States)	Logan Day	D	R	32	2026	Seminole, Florida, United States
91	(Kazakhstan)	Madi Dikhanbek	D	L	25	2024	Satpaev, Kazakhstan
13	(Kazakhstan)	Dinmukhamed Kaiyrzhan	F	R	23	2021	Ust-Kamenogorsk, Kazakhstan
12	(Kazakhstan)	Vsevolod Logvin	C	L	22	2023	Ust-Kamenogorsk, Kazakhstan
29	(Kazakhstan)	Kirill Lyapunov	RW	L	21	2024	Rudny, Kazakhstan
2	(Canada)	Jake Massie (A)	D	L	29	2025	St-Lazare, Quebec, Canada
3	(United States)	Ian McCoshen	D	L	31	2025	Anaheim, California, United States
11	(United States)	Mason Morelli (A)	LW	L	30	2025	Minot, North Dakota, United States
81	(Kazakhstan)	Batyrlan Muratov	F	R	27	2022	Astana, Kazakhstan
17	(Kazakhstan)	Alikhan Omirbekov	C	L	25	2023	Satpaev, Kazakhstan
19	(Kazakhstan)	Beibarys Orazov	D	R	21	2024	Ust-Kamenogorsk, Kazakhstan
22	(Kazakhstan)	Kirill Panyukov	LW	R	29	2024	Astana, Kazakhstan
14	(Canada)	Garrett Pilon	C	R	28	2026	Mineola, New York, United States
4	(United States)	Chase Priskie	D	R	30	2026	Pembroke Pines, Florida, United States
84	(Kazakhstan)	Kirill Savitski (C)	LW	L	31	2021	Ust-Kamenogorsk, Kazakhstan
77	(Kazakhstan)	Ansar Shaikhmeddenov	F	L	24	2021	Ust-Kamenogorsk, Kazakhstan
32	(United States)	Hunter Shepard	G	L	31	2026	Cohasset, Minnesota, United States
43	(Kazakhstan)	Andrei Shutov	G	L	28	2024	Ust-Kamenogorsk, Kazakhstan
70	(Kazakhstan)	Semyon Simonov	RW	L	21	2024	Temirtau, Kazakhstan
9	(United States)	Tyce Thompson	F	R	26	2025	Oyster Bay, New York, United States

=== Team captains ===
- Dmitri Frolov, 2004–05
- Dmitri Shalabanov, 2005
- Alexei Khramtsov, 2005–06
- Oleg Kovalenko, 2006
- Sergei Nevstruyev, 2006–07
- Ildar Yubin, 2007
- Remir Khaidarov, 2007–08
- Kevin Dallman, 2008–12
- Dmitri Upper, 2012–14
- Brandon Bochenski, 2014–17
- Nigel Dawes, 2017–18
- Brandon Bochenski, 2018–19
- Darren Dietz, 2019–21
- Nikita Mikhailis, 2022–23
- Roman Starchenko, 2023–25
- Kirill Savitski, 2025–present

=== Head coaches ===
- Nikolai Myshagin, 2000–02
- Sergei Mogilnikov, 2002–03
- Anatoli Melikhov, 2003–04
- Galym Mambetaliyev, 2004–05
- Nikolai Myshagin, 2005–07
- Mikhail Panin, 2007
- Sergei Mogilnikov, 2007
- Alexander Vysotsky, 2007–09
- Andrei Shayanov, 2009–10
- Andrei Khomutov, 2010–11
- Andrei Shayanov, 2011–12
- Vladimir Krikunov, 2012–13
- Ari-Pekka Selin, 2013–14
- Andrei Nazarov, 2014–15
- Yerlan Sagymbayev, 2015
- Evgeni Koreshkov, 2015 (interim)
- Andrei Nazarov, 2015–16
- Eduard Zankovets, 2016–17
- Evgeni Koreshkov, 2017
- Galym Mambetaliyev, 2017–18
- Andrei Skabelka, 2018–20
- Yuri Mikhailis, 2020–22
- Andrei Skabelka, 2022–23
- Galym Mambetaliyev, 2023
- Andrei Skabelka, 2023–24
- David Nemirovsky, 2024
- Vyacheslav Butsayev, 2024
- Galym Mambetaliyev, 2024–25
- Mikhail Kravets, 2025–present

=== Presidents ===
- Vladimir Pashkovsky, 1999–2006
- Nurlan Orazbayev, 2006–12
- Vadim Shakshakbayev, 2012–13
- Nurlan Orazbayev, 2013–15
- Alexander Koreshkov, 2015–2017
- Askar Shopobayev, 2017–2018
- Boris Ivanishchev, 2018–2024
- Nurlan Orazbayev, 2024–present

== Franchise records and leaders ==
=== Single-season leaders ===
Regular season records

- Most goals in a season: Nigel Dawes, 32 (2014–15)
- Most assists in a season: Jozef Stümpel, 39 (2009–10)
- Most points in a season: Brandon Bochenski, 59 (2011–12)
- Most penalty minutes in a season: Tomas Kloucek, 197 (2008–09)
- Most points in a season by a defenceman: Kevin Dallman, 58 (2008–09)
- Most wins in a season: Jeff Glass, 19 (2009–10), Ari Ahonen, 19 (2013–14)
- Most power play goals in a season: Konstantin Glazachev, 16 (2008–09)
- Best +/- record in a season: Vitali Novopashin +25 (2010–11)

Playoff records

- Most points in a playoff season: Nigel Dawes, 9 (2012–13), Brandon Bochenski, 9 (2013–14)
- Most goals in a playoff season: Nigel Dawes, 7 (2012–13)
- Most goals by a defenceman in a playoff season: Andrew Hutchinson, 3 (2011–12)
- Most assists in a playoff season: Brandon Bochenski, 7 (2013–14)
- Most goals in a single playoff game: Nigel Dawes, 4 (22 February 2013 against Traktor Chelyabinsk)
- Most penalty minutes in a playoff season: Vadim Krasnoslobodtsev, 25 (2009–10), Jiri Novotny, 25 (2011–12)

Team records

- Most points in a season: 94 (2013–14)
- Most wins in a season: 32 (2013–14)
- Largest margin of victory: 9 (8 September 2013 vs. Severstal Cherepovets (10–1))

=== Scoring leaders ===
These are the top-ten point-scorers in KHL history. Figures are updated after each completed KHL regular season.

Note: Pos = Position; GP = Games played; G = Goals; A = Assists; Pts = Points; P/G = Points per game; = current Barys player

Points
Player	Pos	GP	G	A	Pts	P/G
Brandon Bochenski	RW	412	169	236	405	.98
Roman Starchenko	C	756	196	194	390	.51
Kevin Dallman	D	483	115	233	348	.72
Nigel Dawes	LW	377	196	146	342	.91
Dustin Boyd	C	394	116	128	244	.62
Nikita Mikhailis	LW	375	95	113	208	.55
Talgat Zhailauov	C	390	72	97	169	.43
Darren Dietz	D	247	59	103	162	.65
Vadim Krasnoslobodtsev	LW	285	57	83	140	.49
Roman Savchenko	D	475	47	79	126	.26

Goals
Player	Pos	G
Nigel Dawes	LW	196
Roman Starchenko	C	196
Brandon Bochenski	RW	169
Dustin Boyd	C	116
Kevin Dallman	D	115
Nikita Mikhailis	LW	95
Talgat Zhailauov	C	72
Darren Dietz	D	59
Vadim Krasnoslobodtsev	LW	57
Maxim Spiridonov	RW	54

Assists
Player	Pos	A
Brandon Bochenski	RW	236
Kevin Dallman	D	233
Roman Starchenko	C	194
Nigel Dawes	LW	146
Dustin Boyd	C	128
Nikita Mikhailis	LW	113
Darren Dietz	D	103
Talgat Zhailauov	C	97
Vadim Krasnoslobodtsev	LW	83
Curtis Valk	C	79

== Awards and trophies ==
=== Team ===
Kazakhstan Hockey Championship

- Winners (2): 2007–08, 2008–09
- Runners-up (3): 1999–2000, 2000–01, 2001–02

Kazakhstan Hockey Cup

- Runners-up (1): 2006
- Third place (1): 2005

Pervaya Liga – Ural-Western Siberia Zone

- Winners (1): 2006–07
- Runners-up (1): 2005–06
- Third place (1): 2004–05

=== Players ===
KHL All-Star Team

- Kevin Dallman: 2009, 2010, 2011, 2012
- Jozef Stümpel: 2010
- Lukáš Kašpar: 2011
- Brandon Bochenski: 2012, 2014
- Talgat Zhailauov: 2014
- Nigel Dawes: 2015
- Mike Lundin: 2015

Faith Towards Hockey Award

- Alexander Koreshkov: 2009–10

Golden Helmet Award

- Kevin Dallman: 2008–09, 2011–12

KHL Best Sniper Award

- Brandon Bochenski: 2011–12

Best Troika Award

- Nigel Dawes – Dustin Boyd – Brandon Bochenski: 2014–15

Preceded by Kazzinc-Torpedo	Kazakhstan champions 2007–08	Succeeded by Barys Astana
Preceded by Barys Astana	Kazakhstan champions 2008–09	Succeeded by Saryarka Karagandy
