= 2018–19 IIHF Continental Cup =

2018–2019 IIHF Continental Cup

Tournament details
- Dates: 28 September 2018 – 13 January 2019
- Teams: 17

Final positions
- Champions: (Kazakhstan) Arlan Kokshetau (1st title)
- Runners-up: (United Kingdom) Belfast Giants
- Third place: (Poland) GKS Katowice
- Fourth place: (Belarus) HK Gomel

Tournament statistics
- Games played: 36

The 2018–19 Continental Cup was the 22nd edition of the IIHF Continental Cup, Europe's second-tier ice hockey club competition organised by International Ice Hockey Federation. The season started on 28 September 2018 and the final tournament was played from 11 to 13 January 2019.

== Qualified teams ==
Team	Qualification
Enter in the third round
(Belarus) HK Gomel	2017 Belarusian Cup winners
(Croatia) Medveščak Zagreb	2017–18 Croatian Ice Hockey League champions
(France) Lyon Lions	2017–18 Coupe de France winners
(United Kingdom) Belfast Giants	2017–18 Challenge Cup winners
(Kazakhstan) Arlan Kokshetau	2017–18 Kazakhstan Hockey Championship champions
(Poland) GKS Katowice	2017–18 Polska Hokej Liga runners-up
Enter in the second round
(Hungary) MAC Budapest	2017–18 Erste Liga champions
(Italy) Ritten Sport	2017–18 IHL - Elite champions
(Latvia) Kurbads Riga	2017–18 Latvian Hockey Higher League champions
(Serbia) Crvena Zvezda	2017–18 Serbian Hockey League champions
(Slovenia) HDD Jesenice	2017–18 Slovenian Ice Hockey League champions
(Spain) Txuri Urdin	2017–18 Liga Nacional de Hockey Hielo champions
(Ukraine) HC Donbass	2017–18 Ukrainian Hockey League champions
Enter in the first round
(Bulgaria) Irbis-Skate Sofia	2017–18 Bulgarian Hockey League champions
(Iceland) Vikingar Akureyri	2017–18 Icelandic Hockey League champions
(Israel) HC Bat Yam	2017–18 Israeli Hockey League champions
(Turkey) Zeytinburnu Belediyespor	2017–18 Turkish Ice Hockey Super League champions

== First round ==
=== Group A ===
The Group A tournament was played in Sofia, Bulgaria, from 28 to 30 September 2018.

Pos	Team	Pld	W	OTW	OTL	L	GF	GA	GD	Pts	Qualification
1	(Iceland) Vikingar Akureyri	3	2	1	0	0	13	5	+8	8	Advance to Second round
2	(Bulgaria) Irbis-Skate Sofia (H)	3	2	0	1	0	17	8	+9	7	
3	(Turkey) Zeytinburnu Belediyespor	3	1	0	0	2	7	11	−4	3	
4	(Israel) HC Bat Yam	3	0	0	0	3	1	14	−13	0	

Source: IIHF
(H) Host

All times are local (UTC+3).

28 September 2018; 16:00	Zeytinburnu Belediyespor (Turkey)	4–0 (1–0, 2–0, 1–0)	(Israel) HC Bat Yam	Winter Sports Palace; Attendance: 50

Game reference
12 min	Penalties	16 min
33	Shots	17

28 September 2018; 20:00	Vikingar Akureyri (Iceland)	5–4 GWS (2–2, 1–0, 1–2) (OT: 0–0) (SO: 1–0)	(Bulgaria) Irbis-Skate Sofia	Winter Sports Palace; Attendance: 563

Game reference
12 min	Penalties	18 min
28	Shots	38

29 September 2018; 14:00	Irbis-Skate Sofia (Bulgaria)	8–1 (2–1, 2–0, 4–0)	(Israel) HC Bat Yam	Winter Sports Palace; Attendance: 250

Game reference
10 min	Penalties	10 min
35	Shots	19

29 September 2018; 18:00	Zeytinburnu Belediyespor (Turkey)	1–6 (0–2, 1–3, 0–1)	(Iceland) Vikingar Akureyri	Winter Sports Palace; Attendance: 213

Game reference
14 min	Penalties	8 min
15	Shots	29

30 September 2018; 14:00	HC Bat Yam (Israel)	0–2 (0–0, 0–2, 0–0)	(Iceland) Vikingar Akureyri	Winter Sports Palace; Attendance: 150

Game reference
28 min	Penalties	4 min
14	Shots	28

30 September 2018; 18:00	Irbis-Skate Sofia (Bulgaria)	5–2 (3–1, 0–1, 2–0)	(Turkey) Zeytinburnu Belediyespor	Winter Sports Palace; Attendance: 619

Game reference
12 min	Penalties	14 min
23	Shots	22

== Second round ==
=== Group B ===
The Group B tournament was played in Ritten, Italy, from 19 to 21 October 2018.

Pos	Team	Pld	W	OTW	OTL	L	GF	GA	GD	Pts	Qualification
1	(Italy) Ritten Sport (H)	3	3	0	0	0	16	6	+10	9	Advance to Third round
2	(Slovenia) HDD Jesenice	3	1	0	1	1	6	11	−5	4	
3	(Hungary) MAC Budapest	3	1	0	0	2	12	8	+4	3	
4	(Serbia) Crvena Zvezda	3	0	1	0	2	6	15	−9	2	

Source: IIHF
(H) Host

All times are local (UTC+2).

19 October 2018; 16:00	MAC Budapest (Hungary)	8–0 (1–0, 6–0, 1–0)	(Serbia) Crvena Zvezda	Arena Ritten; Attendance: 75

Game reference
8 min	Penalties	16 min
47	Shots	19

19 October 2018; 20:00	HDD Jesenice (Slovenia)	1–6 (0–3, 1–3, 0–0)	(Italy) Ritten Sport	Arena Ritten; Attendance: 812

Game reference
8 min	Penalties	35 min
40	Shots	27

20 October 2018; 16:00	MAC Budapest (Hungary)	3–4 (0–1, 2–2, 1–1)	(Slovenia) HDD Jesenice	Arena Ritten; Attendance: 120

Game reference
10 min	Penalties	18 min
32	Shots	21

20 October 2018; 20:00	Ritten Sport (Italy)	6–4 (2–1, 0–2, 4–1)	(Serbia) Crvena Zvezda	Arena Ritten; Attendance: 900

Game reference
2 min	Penalties	14 min
58	Shots	22

21 October 2018; 14:00	Crvena Zvezda (Serbia)	2–1 OT (0–0, 0–0, 1–1) (OT 1–0)	(Slovenia) HDD Jesenice	Arena Ritten; Attendance: 51

Game reference
10 min	Penalties	8 min
18	Shots	46

21 October 2018; 18:00	Ritten Sport (Italy)	4–1 (2–0, 1–1, 1–0)	(Hungary) MAC Budapest	Arena Ritten; Attendance: 825

Game reference
16 min	Penalties	14 min
32	Shots	50

=== Group C ===
The Group C tournament was played in Riga, Latvia, from 19 to 21 October 2018.

Pos	Team	Pld	W	OTW	OTL	L	GF	GA	GD	Pts	Qualification
1	(Latvia) Kurbads Riga (H)	3	3	0	0	0	19	4	+15	9	Advance to Third round
2	(Ukraine) HC Donbass	3	2	0	0	1	13	7	+6	6	
3	(Iceland) Vikingar Akureyri	3	1	0	0	2	8	17	−9	3	
4	(Spain) Txuri Urdin	3	0	0	0	3	5	17	−12	0	

Source: IIHF
(H) Host

All times are local (UTC+3).

19 October 2018; 15:30	Txuri Urdin (Spain)	2–6 (0–2, 2–3, 0–1)	(Ukraine) HC Donbass	Kurbads Ledus Halle; Attendance: 160

Game reference
31 min	Penalties	51 min
19	Shots	47

19 October 2018; 19:30	Kurbads Riga (Latvia)	9–2 (3–0, 4–1, 2–1)	(Iceland) Vikingar Akureyri	Kurbads Ledus Halle; Attendance: 173

Game reference
4 min	Penalties	4 min
68	Shots	20

20 October 2018; 14:00	HC Donbass (Ukraine)	6–3 (1–1, 1–1, 4–1)	(Iceland) Vikingar Akureyri	Kurbads Ledus Halle; Attendance: 75

Game reference
0 min	Penalties	20 min
60	Shots	12

20 October 2018; 18:00	Kurbads Riga (Latvia)	8–1 (2–0, 5–1, 1–0)	(Spain) Txuri Urdin	Kurbads Ledus Halle; Attendance: 750

Game reference
10 min	Penalties	16 min
54	Shots	14

21 October 2018; 14:00	Vikingar Akureyri (Iceland)	3–2 (0–0, 1–1, 2–1)	(Spain) Txuri Urdin	Kurbads Ledus Halle; Attendance: 63

Game reference
10 min	Penalties	4 min
39	Shots	37

21 October 2018; 18:00	HC Donbass (Ukraine)	1–2 (0–0, 0–2, 1–0)	(Latvia) Kurbads Riga	Kurbads Ledus Halle; Attendance: 968

Game reference
8 min	Penalties	8 min
27	Shots	27

== Third round ==
=== Group D ===
The Group D tournament was played in Lyon, France, from 16 to 18 November 2018.

Pos	Team	Pld	W	OTW	OTL	L	GF	GA	GD	Pts	Qualification
1	(Kazakhstan) Arlan Kokshetau	3	1	2	0	0	9	4	+5	7	Advance to Final round
2	(Belarus) HK Gomel	3	2	0	0	1	8	6	+2	6	Advance to Final round
3	(Latvia) Kurbads Riga	3	1	0	1	1	8	12	−4	4	
4	(France) Lyon Lions (H)	3	0	0	1	2	4	7	−3	1	

Source: IIHF
(H) Host

All times are local (UTC+1).

16 November 2018; 14:30	HK Gomel (Belarus)	6–2 (3–0, 1–2, 2–0)	(Latvia) Kurbads Riga	Patinoire Charlemagne; Attendance: 105

Game reference
8 min	Penalties	34 min
40	Shots	24

16 November 2018; 20:30	Lyon Lions (France)	1–2 GWS (0–1, 1–0, 0–0) (OT: 0–0) (SO: 0–1)	(Kazakhstan) Arlan Kokshetau	Patinoire Charlemagne; Attendance: 2,224

Game reference
6 min	Penalties	12 min
30	Shots	30

17 November 2018; 15:00	Arlan Kokshetau (Kazakhstan)	4–3 GWS (1–2, 1–0, 1–1) (OT: 0–0) (SO: 1–0)	(Latvia) Kurbads Riga	Patinoire Charlemagne; Attendance: 112

Game reference
18 min	Penalties	37 min
43	Shots	36

17 November 2018; 20:00	HK Gomel (Belarus)	2–1 (3–0, 1–2, 2–0)	(France) Lyon Lions	Patinoire Charlemagne; Attendance: 2,006

Game reference
12 min	Penalties	10 min
29	Shots	24

18 November 2018; 14:00	Arlan Kokshetau (Kazakhstan)	3–0 (2–0, 1–0, 0–0)	(Belarus) HK Gomel	Patinoire Charlemagne; Attendance: 205

Game reference
4 min	Penalties	6 min
33	Shots	22

18 November 2018; 18:00	Kurbads Riga (Latvia)	3–2 (1–1, 0–0, 2–1)	(France) Lyon Lions	Patinoire Charlemagne; Attendance: 1,452

Game reference
12 min	Penalties	10 min
27	Shots	44

=== Group E ===
The Group E tournament was played in Belfast, United Kingdom, from 15 to 17 November 2018.

Pos	Team	Pld	W	OTW	OTL	L	GF	GA	GD	Pts	Qualification
1	(United Kingdom) Belfast Giants (H)	3	2	0	0	1	12	6	+6	6 (Note: Belfast Giants 3 Pts, +2 GD; GKS Katowice 3 Pts, +1 GD; Medveščak Zagreb 3 Pts, –3 GD)	Advance to Final round
2	(Poland) GKS Katowice	3	2	0	0	1	10	5	+5	6	Advance to Final round
3	(Croatia) Medveščak Zagreb	3	2	0	0	1	6	7	−1	6	
4	(Italy) Ritten Sport	3	0	0	0	3	3	13	−10	0	

Source: IIHF
(H) Host
Notes:

All times are local (UTC±0).

15 November 2018; 15:00	GKS Katowice (Poland)	4–0 (1–0, 2–0, 1–0)	(Italy) Ritten Sport	SSE Arena; Attendance: 200

Game reference
12 min	Penalties	6 min
39	Shots	28

15 November 2018; 19:00	Medveščak Zagreb (Croatia)	0–4 (0–1, 0–1, 0–2)	(United Kingdom) Belfast Giants	SSE Arena; Attendance: 2,929

Game reference
22 min	Penalties	20 min
34	Shots	36

16 November 2018; 15:00	GKS Katowice (Poland)	2–3 (0–2, 1–0, 1–1)	(Croatia) Medveščak Zagreb	SSE Arena; Attendance: 642

Game reference
12 min	Penalties	20 min
29	Shots	34

16 November 2018; 19:00	Belfast Giants (United Kingdom)	6–2 (2–2, 2–0, 2–0)	(Italy) Ritten Sport	SSE Arena; Attendance: 3,595

Game reference
37 min	Penalties	31 min
45	Shots	32

17 November 2018; 15:00	Ritten Sport (Italy)	1–3 (0–1, 0–0, 1–2)	(Croatia) Medveščak Zagreb	SSE Arena; Attendance: 578

Game reference
6 min	Penalties	16 min
24	Shots	46

17 November 2018; 19:00	Belfast Giants (United Kingdom)	2–4 (1–0, 1–2, 0–2)	(Poland) GKS Katowice	SSE Arena; Attendance: 5,618

Game reference
37 min	Penalties	12 min
29	Shots	31

== Final round ==
Continental Cup Final tournament was played in Belfast, United Kingdom, from 11 to 13 January 2019.

Pos	Team	Pld	W	OTW	OTL	L	GF	GA	GD	Pts
1	(Kazakhstan) Arlan Kokshetau	3	2	1	0	0	15	6	+9	8
2	(United Kingdom) Belfast Giants (H)	3	2	0	1	0	11	5	+6	7
3	(Poland) GKS Katowice	3	1	0	0	2	9	8	+1	3
4	(Belarus) HK Gomel	3	0	0	0	3	2	18	−16	0

Source: IIHF
(H) Host

All times are local (UTC±0).

11 January 2019; 15:00	GKS Katowice (Poland)	2–4 (0–3, 2–0, 0–1)	(Kazakhstan) Arlan Kokshetau	SSE Arena; Attendance: 1,004

Game reference

Kevin Lindskoug
Goalies
Ivan Poloshkov
Referees:
(Czech Republic) Martin Fraňo
(Switzerland) Andreas Koch
Linesmen:
(United Kingdom) Andrew Cook
(United Kingdom) Robert Pullar

	0–1	11:44 – Savenkov (Klemeshov, Kiselyov)
	0–2	14:13 – Borovikov (Berdnikov, Shitikov) (PP)
	0–3	18:00 – Potaichuk (Kiselyov, Savenkov) (PP)
Tuhkanen (Laakkonen, Rohtla) (PP2) – 23:40	1–3
Rohtla (Laakkonen, Čakajík) – 27:16	2–3
	2–4	54:21 – Klemeshov (Nesterov)

6 min
Penalties
8 min
21
Shots
20

11 January 2019; 19:00	Belfast Giants (United Kingdom)	5–0 (1–0, 1–0, 3–0)	(Belarus) HK Gomel	SSE Arena; Attendance: 3,728

Game reference

Tyler Beskorowany
Goalies
Roman Bobariko
Referees:
(Canada) Alexandre Garon
(Latvia) Ladislav Smetana
Linesmen:
(Slovakia) Martin Jobbágy
(Netherlands) Joep Leermakers

Rutherford (Leonard, Roach) – 17:54	1–0
Dwyer (Higgins, Baun) – 21:58	2–0
D. Murphy (Rutherford, Vandermeer) (PP) – 44:02	3–0
Shields (D. Murphy, Vandermeer) – 50:20	4–0
Higgins (Dwyer, Baun) (PP) – 57:41	5–0

6 min
Penalties
10 min
35
Shots
13

12 January 2019; 15:00	Arlan Kokshetau (Kazakhstan)	8–2 (4–0, 3–1, 1–1)	(Belarus) HK Gomel	SSE Arena; Attendance: 1,102

Game reference

Mikhail Demidov
Goalies
Roman Bobariko
Alexei Merzlov
Referees:
(Germany) Gordon Schukies
(Latvia) Ladislav Smetana
Linesmen:
(United Kingdom) Robert Pullar
(United Kingdom) Scott Rodger

Kiselyov (Savenkov) – 05:11	1–0
Potaichuk (Savenkov) – 07:53	2–0
Berdnikov (Malevich) – 09:54	3–0
Antsiferov (Petrov) – 11:42	4–0
Potaichuk (Kiselyov, Savenkov) – 25:03	5–0
Petrov (PS) – 26:45	6–0
	6–1	30:35 – Tochilkin (PP)
Nesterov (Gasnikov) – 37:33	7–1
Borovikov (Yermolayev, Shitikov) – 49:00	8–1
	8–2	59:56 – Solomonov (Suslo, Musienko)

6 min
Penalties
4 min
41
Shots
16

12 January 2019; 19:00	Belfast Giants (United Kingdom)	4–2 (1–0, 1–2, 2–0)	(Poland) GKS Katowice	SSE Arena; Attendance: 4,572

Game reference

Tyler Beskorowany
Goalies
Kevin Lindskoug
Referees:
(Canada) Alexandre Garon
(Switzerland) Andreas Koch
Linesmen:
(Slovakia) Martin Jobbágy
(Georgia (country)) Tornike Kuchava

D. Murphy (Leonard, Rutherford) – 17:07	1–0
	1–1	20:14 – Rohtla (Łopuski, Jyrkkiö)
D. Murphy (Riley, McFaull) – 31:14	2–1
	2–2	39:51 – Laakkonen (Rohtla, Devečka)
Leonard (Riley) – 40:15	3–2
Johner (Roach, Dwyer) (PP2) – 58:52	4–2

10 min
Penalties
48 min
47
Shots
28

13 January 2019; 13:00	HK Gomel (Belarus)	0–5 (0–2, 0–2, 0–1)	(Poland) GKS Katowice	SSE Arena; Attendance: 726

Game reference

Roman Bobariko
Goalies
Kevin Lindskoug
Referees:
(Switzerland) Andreas Koch
(Latvia) Ladislav Smetana
Linesmen:
(United Kingdom) Andrew Cook
(United Kingdom) Scott Rodger

0–1	00:17 – Łopuski (Jyrkkiö, Rohtla)
0–2	13:19 – Łopuski (Rohtla, Jyrkkiö) (PP2)
0–3	20:27 – Łopuski (Rohtla, Laakkonen) (PP)
0–4	21:51 – Strzyżowski (Starzyński, Urbanowicz)
0–5	58:15 – Jyrkkiö (Laakkonen)

28 min
Penalties
10 min
17
Shots
44

13 January 2019; 17:00	Arlan Kokshetau (Kazakhstan)	3–2 GWS (2–0, 0–0, 0–2) (OT: 0–0) (SO: 1–0)	(United Kingdom) Belfast Giants	SSE Arena

Game reference

Ivan Poloshkov
Goalies
Tyler Beskorowany
Referees:
(Czech Republic) Martin Fraňo
(Germany) Gordon Schukies
Linesmen:
(Georgia (country)) Tornike Kuchava
(Netherlands) Joep Leermakers

Yegorov (Nesterov) – 11:51	1–0
Yermolayev – 18:08	2–0
	2–1	47:44 – Higgins (Baun)
	2–2	48:56 – Johner (Ferland, Shields)

Potaichuk (miss)
Malevich (miss)
Yermolayev (miss)
Gasnikov
Berdnikov (miss)
Gasnikov
Shootout
(miss) D. Murphy
(miss) Higgins
(miss) Dwyer
(miss) Rutherford
Johner
(miss) Rutherford
8 min
Penalties
10 min
30
Shots
41

== See also ==
- 2018–19 Champions Hockey League
