= 2010 Kazakhstan Hockey Cup =

The 2010 Kazakhstan Hockey Cup was the 8th edition of the Kazakhstan Hockey Cup, the national ice hockey cup competition in Kazakhstan. Eight teams participated and Gornyak Rudny won its 1st cup.

== First round ==
=== Group A ===
	GP	W	OTW	OTL	L	GF:GA	Pts
Saryarka Karagandy	3	2	0	0	1	19:13	6
Gornyak Rudny	3	2	0	0	1	15:11	6
Arlan Kokshetau	3	1	0	0	2	10:16	3
Barys Astana-2	3	1	0	0	2	12:16	3

=== Group B ===
	GP	W	OTW	OTL	L	GF:GA	Pts
Beibarys Atyrau	3	2	1	0	0	11:6	8
Kazzinc-Torpedo	3	1	0	1	1	10:7	4
Kazakhmys Satpaev	3	1	0	0	2	10:14	3
Yertis Pavlodar	3	1	0	0	2	6:10	3

== Final round ==
=== Placing round ===
5th-8th place
Yertis Pavlodar	8
Arlan Kokshetau	0
Barys Astana 2	3
Kazakhmys Satpaev	4

5th place game
Yertis Pavlodar	6
Kazakhmys Satpaev	3
7th place game
Arlan Kokshetau	3
Barys Astana 2	2

=== Final ===
Semifinals
Saryarka Karagandy	4
Kazzinc-Torpedo	3
Gornyak Rudny	4
Beibarys Atyrau	2

Final
Saryarka Karagandy	0
Gornyak Rudny	3
3rd place game
Kazzinc-Torpedo	5
Saryarka Karagandy	3
