= List of Beibarys Atyrau seasons =

This is a list of seasons completed by the Beibarys Atyrau. This list documents the records and playoff results for all season the Beibarys Atyrau hockey team have completed since their inception.

Champions	League leader

Season	GP	W	L	OTW	OTL	Pts	GF	GA	Finish	Playoffs
2009–10	56	32	12	4	8	112	203	105	3rd	Won in Semifinals, 3–2 (Yertis Pavlodar); Lost in Finals, 3-2 (Saryarka Karagandy)
2010–11	54	37	11	2	4	119	177	99	2nd	Won in Quarterfinals, 3–0 (Gornyak Rudny); Won in Semifinals, 4–2 (Yertis Pavlodar); Kazakhstan Champions, 4-0 (Barys Astana-2)
2011–12	54	40	9	3	2	128	220	71	1st	Won in Quarterfinals, 3–0 (HC Almaty); Won in Semifinals, 4–0 (Arystan Temirtau); Kazakhstan Champions, 4-2 (Yertis Pavlodar)
2012–13	54	26	16	4	8	94	150	97	4th	Won in Quarterfinals, 4–0 (Gornyak Rudny); Won in Semifinals, 4–1 (Arlan Kokshetau); Lost in Finals, 4-1 (Yertis Pavlodar)
