= 2011 Kazakhstan Hockey Cup =

The 2011 Kazakhstan Hockey Cup was the 9th edition of the Kazakhstan Hockey Cup, the national ice hockey cup competition in Kazakhstan. Ten teams participated and Arystan Temirtau won its 1st cup.

== First round ==
=== Group A ===
	GP	W	OTW	OTL	L	GF:GA	Pts
Saryarka Karagandy	4	4	0	0	0	19:4	12
HC Astana	4	3	0	0	1	12:6	9
Arlan Kokshetau	4	1	1	0	2	11:9	5
Gornyak Rudny	4	1	0	1	2	12:15	4
Kazzinc-Torpedo-2	4	0	0	0	4	4:24	0

=== Group B ===
	GP	W	OTW	OTL	L	GF:GA	Pts
Arystan Temirtau	4	3	0	0	1	14:8	9
Yertis Pavlodar	3	2	1	0	1	13:11	8
Barys Astana-2	3	2	0	0	2	13:15	6
Beibarys Atyrau	3	2	0	0	2	9:9	6
HC Almaty	3	0	0	1	3	10:16	1

== Final round ==
- Match for 9th place:
- Kazzinc-Torpedo-2 - HC Almaty 2-8
- Match for 7th place:
- Gornyak Rudny - Beibarys Atyrau 4-3 (OT)
- Match for 5th place:
- Arlan Kokshetau - Barys Astana-2 5-1
- Match for 3rd place:
- HC Astana - Yertis Pavlodar 0-4
- Final:
- Saryarka Karagandy - Arystan Temirtau 0-1 (OT)
