= 2021–22 Kazakhstan Hockey Championship =

Kazakhstan Hockey Championship (2021–22)

- League: Kazakhstan Hockey Championship
- Sport: Ice Hockey
- Duration: September 2016 – April 2017
- Number of games: 312
- Number of teams: 13

Regular season
- Season champions: Arlan Kokshetau
- Top scorer: (Russia) Nikita Anokhovsky (Saryarka Karaganda) (66 points)

Finals
- Champions: Saryarka Karaganda

Kazakhstan Hockey Championship seasons
- ← 2020–21 2022–23 →

The 2021–22 Kazakhstan Hockey Championship, known as the Pro Hokei Ligasy, was the 30th season since the founding of the Kazakhstan Hockey Championship. Saryarka Karaganda won the championship, defeating Arlan Kokshetau in the final.

== Regular season ==
=== Standings ===
Team	Pld	W	OTW	OTL	L	GF	GA	GD	Pts	Qualification
Saryarka Karaganda	48	37	4	1	6	225	77	+148	120	Direct playoff qualification
Arlan Kokshetau	48	31	8	4	5	187	95	+92	113	Direct playoff qualification
Beibarys Atyrau	48	31	3	2	12	190	114	+76	101	Direct playoff qualification
Torpedo Ust-Kamenogorsk	48	29	3	1	15	169	105	+64	94	Direct playoff qualification
Nomad Astana	48	24	6	3	15	188	131	+57	87	Direct playoff qualification
HC Aktobe	48	21	4	8	15	153	143	+10	79	Direct playoff qualification
Kulager Petropavl	48	18	7	5	18	135	153	−18	73	Direct playoff qualification
Altay-Torpedo Ust-Kamenogorsk	48	17	4	4	23	151	167	−16	63	Direct playoff qualification
HC Temirtau	48	14	6	6	22	120	149	−29	60	
Gornyak Rudny	48	16	2	5	25	145	163	−18	57	
Snezhnye Barsy Nur-Sultan	48	8	4	7	29	100	179	−79	39	
HC Almaty	48	9	3	2	34	106	203	−97	35	
Yertis Pavlodar	48	3	0	6	39	81	271	−190	15	

== Play-off ==
=== Quarterfinals ===
- Saryarka Karaganda defeated Altay-Torpedo Ust-Kamenogorsk 4 games to 0
- Arlan Kokshetau defeated Kulager Petropavl 4 games to 0
- Beibarys Atyrau defeated HC Aktobe 4 games to 2
- Nomad Astana defeated Torpedo Ust-Kamenogorsk 4 games to 1

=== Semifinals ===
- Saryarka Karaganda defeated Nomad Astana 4 games to 2
- Arlan Kokshetau defeated Beibarys Atyrau 4 games to 3

=== Finals ===
- Saryarka Karaganda defeated Arlan Kokshetau 4 games to 3

== Awards ==
- Best goaltender: Ilya Rumyanstev (Arlan Kokshetau)
- Best defenceman: Edgars Siksna (Saryarka Karaganda)
- Best forward: Mikhail Rakhmanov (Saryarka Karaganda)
- Best rookie: Ivan Zinchenko (HC Aktobe)
