= 2014 Kazakhstan Hockey Cup =

National ice hockey cup competition

The 2014 Kazakhstan Hockey Cup was the 12th edition of the Kazakhstan Hockey Cup, the national ice hockey cup competition in Kazakhstan. Tent teams participated and Yertis Pavlodar won its 1st cup.

== First round ==
=== Group A ===
	GP	W	OTW	OTL	L	GF:GA	Pts
Yertis Pavlodar	4	4	0	0	0	12:10	9
Nomad Astana	4	2	0	0	2	14:12	6
Arystan Temirtau	4	2	0	0	2	13:11	6
HC Almaty	4	2	0	0	2	9:11	6
HC Astana	4	1	0	0	3	11:15	3

=== Group B ===
	GP	W	OTW	OTL	L	GF:GA	Pts
Arlan Kokshetau	4	3	0	1	0	21:10	10
Beibarys Atyrau	4	2	1	1	0	13:10	8
Gornyak Rudny	4	2	0	0	2	14:15	6
Berkut Karagandy	4	1	0	0	3	10:10	3
Torpedo Oskemen	4	0	0	0	4	8:21	0

== Final round ==
- Match for 3rd place:
- Nomad Astana - Beibarys Atyrau 2-1
- Final:
- Yertis Pavlodar - Arlan Kokshetau 4-1
