= 2013 Kazakhstan Hockey Cup =

The 2013 Kazakhstan Hockey Cup was the 11th edition of the Kazakhstan Hockey Cup, the national ice hockey cup competition in Kazakhstan. Ten teams participated and Arlan Kokshetau won its 2nd cup.

== First round ==
=== Group A ===
	GP	W	OTW	OTL	L	GF:GA	Pts
Yertis Pavlodar	4	4	0	0	0	18:4	12
Arystan Temirtau	4	3	0	0	1	21:8	9
Gornyak Rudny	4	1	1	0	2	8:13	5
HC Astana	4	1	0	1	2	8:18	4
Torpedo Oskemen	4	0	0	0	4	10:22	0

=== Group B ===
	GP	W	OTW	OTL	L	GF:GA	Pts
Arlan Kokshetau	4	4	0	0	0	21:6	12
HC Almaty	4	1	1	1	1	12:11	6
Berkut Karagandy	4	1	1	0	2	6:12	5
Beibarys Atyrau	4	1	0	1	2	8:7	4
Nomad Astana	4	1	0	0	3	8:19	3

== Final round ==
- Match for 3rd place:
- Arystan Temirtau - HC Almaty 5-2
- Final:
- Yertis Pavlodar - Arlan Kokshetau 2-3 (OT)
