= 2023–24 IIHF Continental Cup =

European ice hockey club competition

Tournament details
- Dates: 22 September 2023 – 14 January 2024
- Teams: 19

Final positions
- Champions: (Kazakhstan) Nomad Astana (1st title)
- Runners-up: (Denmark) Herning Blue Fox
- Third place: (United Kingdom) Cardiff Devils
- Fourth place: (Poland) GKS Katowice

The 2023–24 Continental Cup was the 26th edition of the IIHF Continental Cup, Europe's second-tier ice hockey club competition organised by International Ice Hockey Federation. The season began on 22 September 2023 and the final tournament was played from 12 to 14 January 2024.

== Qualified teams ==
Team	Qualification
Enter in the third round
(Denmark) Herning Blue Fox	2022–23 Metal Ligaen runners-up
(France) Brûleurs de Loups	2022–23 Coupe de France champions
(Italy) SG Cortina	2022–23 IHL – Elite champions
(United Kingdom) Cardiff Devils	2022–23 Fourth place finish in EIHL
(Kazakhstan) Nomad Astana	2022–23 Kazakhstan Hockey Championship champions
(Poland) GKS Katowice	2022–23 Polska Hokej Liga champions
Enter in the second round
(Hungary) Ferencvárosi TC	2022–23 OB I bajnokság champions
(Latvia) HK Zemgale/LLU	2022–23 Latvian Hockey League champions
(Romania) CMS Corona Brasov	2022–23 Romanian Hockey League champions
(Ukraine) Sokil Kyiv	2022–23 Ukrainian Hockey League champions
(Slovenia) HK Celje	2022–23 Slovenian Ice Hockey League champions
(Serbia) SKHL Crvena zvezda	2022–23 Serbian Hockey League champions
Enter in the first round
(Belgium) Bulldogs Liège	2022–23 BeNe League champions
(Lithuania) Kaunas City	2022–23 Lithuania Hockey League champions
(Croatia) KHL Zagreb	2022–23 Croatian Ice Hockey League champions
(Iceland) Skautafelag Reykjavikur	2022–23 Icelandic Hockey League champions
(Estonia) HC Panter	2022–23 Meistriliiga champions
(Bulgaria) Irbis-Skate Sofia	2022–23 Bulgarian Hockey League champions
(Spain) CH Jaca	2022–23 Liga Nacional de Hockey Hielo champions
(Turkey) ~~Buzadam Istanbul~~	2022–23 Turkish Ice Hockey Super League champions

Playoff winners Belfast Giants won the EIHL season qualifying them for Champions Hockey League, league runners-up Guildford Flames declined invitation to play, as did third-place team Sheffield Steelers. The fourth-place finish Cardiff Devils were named as the replacement.

== First round ==
=== Group A ===
The Group A tournament was played in Jaca, Spain, from 22 to 24 September 2023.

All times are local (UTC+2).

22 September 2023; 21:00	CH Jaca (Spain)	15–2 (3–1, 5–0, 7–1)	(Bulgaria) Irbis-Skate Sofia	Pabellón de Hielo, Jaca; Attendance: 568

Game reference
6 min	Penalties	18 min
77	Shots	10

24 September 2023; 17:00^{[N 1]}	CH Jaca (Spain)	1–6 (1–0, 0–2, 0–4)	(Belgium) Bulldogs Liège	Pabellón de Hielo, Jaca; Attendance: 465

Game reference
12 min	Penalties	11 min
35	Shots	36

24 September 2023; 17:00	Bulldogs Liège (Belgium)	Cancelled	(Bulgaria) Irbis-Skate Sofia	Pabellón de Hielo, Jaca

The game was originally supposed to be played on 23 September 2023 but was stopped after first period and was rescheduled to 24 September 2023. Tournament Directorate Members agreed that this game will declare the winner of Group A.

=== Group B ===
The Group B tournament was played in Kaunas, Lithuania, from 22 to 24 September 2023.

Pos	Team	Pld	W	OTW	OTL	L	GF	GA	GD	Pts	Qualification
1	(Lithuania) Kaunas City (H)	3	3	0	0	0	30	5	+25	9	Second round
2	(Estonia) HC Panter	3	2	0	0	1	24	13	+11	6	
3	(Croatia) KHL Zagreb	3	1	0	0	2	9	20	−11	3	
4	(Iceland) Skautafélag Reykjavíkur	3	0	0	0	3	4	29	−25	0	

Source: IIHF
(H) Host

All times are local (UTC+3).

22 September 2023; 15:00	HC Panter (Estonia)	14–0 (3–0, 4–0, 5–0)	(Iceland) Skautafélag Reykjavíkur	Kaunas Ice Palace, Kaunas; Attendance: 250

Game reference
7 min	Penalties	35 min
57	Shots	7

22 September 2023; 18:30	KHL Zagreb (Croatia)	0–11 (0–5, 0–4, 0–2)	(Lithuania) Kaunas City	Kaunas Ice Palace, Kaunas; Attendance: 412

Game reference
6 min	Penalties	6 min
11	Shots	37

23 September 2023; 13:00	Skautafélag Reykjavíkur (Iceland)	3–5 (1–0, 1–3, 1–2)	(Croatia) KHL Zagreb	Kaunas Ice Palace, Kaunas; Attendance: 115

Game reference
14 min	Penalties	8 min
26	Shots	35

23 September 2023; 16:30	HC Panter (Estonia)	4–9 (1–1, 1–2, 2–6)	(Lithuania) Kaunas City	Kaunas Ice Palace, Kaunas; Attendance: 521

Game reference
35 min	Penalties	16 min
35	Shots	34

24 September 2023; 13:00	KHL Zagreb (Croatia)	4–6 (1–2, 1–2, 2–2)	(Estonia) HC Panter	Kaunas Ice Palace, Kaunas; Attendance: 107

Game reference
12 min	Penalties	16 min
24	Shots	34

24 September 2023; 16:30	Kaunas City (Lithuania)	10–1 (2–0, 3–0, 5–1)	(Iceland) Skautafélag Reykjavíkur	Kaunas Ice Palace, Kaunas; Attendance: 360

Game reference
4 min	Penalties	8 min
39	Shots	22

== Second round ==
=== Group C ===
The Group C tournament was played in Jelgava, Latvia, from 13 to 15 October 2023.

Pos	Team	Pld	W	OTW	OTL	L	GF	GA	GD	Pts	Qualification
1	(Latvia) HK Zemgale/LBTU (H)	3	3	0	0	0	9	3	+6	9	Third round
2	(Romania) CSM Corona Brașov	3	2	0	0	1	16	7	+9	6	
3	(Slovenia) HK RST-Pellet Celje	3	1	0	0	2	12	11	+1	3	
4	(Belgium) Bulldogs Liège	3	0	0	0	3	6	22	−16	0	

Source: IIHF
(H) Host

All times are local (UTC+3).

13 October 2023; 15:30	HK RST-Pellet Celje (Slovenia)	9–3 (2–1, 2–2, 5–0)	(Belgium) Bulldogs Liège	Jelgava Ice Hall, Jelgava; Attendance: 247

Game reference
10 min	Penalties	10 min
38	Shots	14

13 October 2023; 19:30	HK Zemgale/LBTU (Latvia)	3–1 (2–0, 1–0, 0–1)	(Romania) CSM Corona Brașov	Jelgava Ice Hall, Jelgava; Attendance: 679

Game reference
6 min	Penalties	16 min
34	Shots	28

14 October 2023; 15:30	HK RST-Pellet Celje (Slovenia)	2–4 (1–2, 1–2, 0–0)	(Romania) CSM Corona Brașov	Jelgava Ice Hall, Jelgava; Attendance: 230

Game reference
8 min	Penalties	12 min
30	Shots	40

14 October 2023; 19:30	Bulldogs Liège (Belgium)	1–2 (0–0, 1–1, 0–1)	(Latvia) HK Zemgale/LBTU	Jelgava Ice Hall, Jelgava; Attendance: 655

Game reference
6 min	Penalties	6 min
15	Shots	52

15 October 2023; 15:00	CSM Corona Brașov (Romania)	11–2 (4–0, 2–2, 5–0)	(Belgium) Bulldogs Liège	Jelgava Ice Hall, Jelgava; Attendance: 247

Game reference
6 min	Penalties	6 min
71	Shots	28

15 October 2023; 19:00	HK Zemgale/LBTU (Latvia)	4–1 (2–1, 0–0, 2–0)	(Slovenia) HK RST-Pellet Celje	Jelgava Ice Hall, Jelgava; Attendance: 678

Game reference
12 min	Penalties	6 min
35	Shots	25

=== Group D ===
The Group D tournament was played in Belgrade, Serbia, from 13 to 15 October 2023.

Pos	Team	Pld	W	OTW	OTL	L	GF	GA	GD	Pts	Qualification
1	(Hungary) Ferencvárosi TC	3	3	0	0	0	21	1	+20	9	Third round
2	(Lithuania) Kaunas City	3	1	0	1	1	8	10	−2	4	
3	(Ukraine) Sokil Kyiv	3	1	0	0	2	6	13	−7	3	
4	(Serbia) SKHL Crvena zvezda (H)	3	0	1	0	2	6	17	−11	2	

Source: IIHF
(H) Host

All times are local (UTC+2).

13 October 2023; 16:00	Ferencvárosi TC (Hungary)	5–0 (2–0, 3–0, 0–0)	(Lithuania) Kaunas City	Pionir Ice Hall, Belgrade; Attendance: 47

Game reference
12 min	Penalties	2 min
40	Shots	23

13 October 2023; 19:30	Sokil Kyiv (Ukraine)	4–2 (0–1, 3–0, 1–1)	(Serbia) SKHL Crvena zvezda	Pionir Ice Hall, Belgrade; Attendance: 236

Game reference
6 min	Penalties	10 min
26	Shots	19

14 October 2023; 16:00	Kaunas City (Lithuania)	5–1 (3–0, 2–1, 0–0)	(Ukraine) Sokil Kyiv	Pionir Ice Hall, Belgrade; Attendance: 39

Game reference
14 min	Penalties	4 min
24	Shots	28

14 October 2023; 19:30	Ferencvárosi TC (Hungary)	10–0 (1–0, 7–0, 2–0)	(Serbia) SKHL Crvena zvezda	Pionir Ice Hall, Belgrade; Attendance: 348

Game reference
6 min	Penalties	12 min
38	Shots	16

15 October 2023; 13:30	Sokil Kyiv (Ukraine)	1–6 (1–5, 0–1, 0–0)	(Hungary) Ferencvárosi TC	Pionir Ice Hall, Belgrade; Attendance: 73

Game reference
4 min	Penalties	2 min
20	Shots	41

15 October 2023; 17:00	SKHL Crvena zvezda (Serbia)	4–3 GWS (0–2, 2–1, 1–0) (OT: 0–0) (SO: 1–0)	(Lithuania) Kaunas City	Pionir Ice Hall, Belgrade; Attendance: 336

Game reference
60 min	Penalties	39 min
29	Shots	21

== Third round ==
=== Group E ===
The Group E tournament was played in Grenoble, France, from 17 to 19 November 2023.

Pos	Team	Pld	W	OTW	OTL	L	GF	GA	GD	Pts	Qualification
1	(Kazakhstan) Nomad Astana	3	3	0	0	0	11	5	+6	9	Final round
2	(United Kingdom) Cardiff Devils	3	2	0	0	1	10	7	+3	6	Final round
3	(Latvia) HK Zemgale/LBTU	3	1	0	0	2	6	10	−4	3	
4	(France) Brûleurs de Loups (H)	3	0	0	0	3	1	6	−5	0	

Source: IIHF
(H) Host

All times are local (UTC+1).

17 November 2023; 16:00	Cardiff Devils (United Kingdom)	4–5 (0–0, 2–3, 2–2)	(Kazakhstan) Nomad Astana	Patinoire Polesud, Grenoble; Attendance: 1,523

Game reference
12 min	Penalties	8 min
45	Shots	29

17 November 2023; 20:15	Brûleurs de Loups (France)	1–3 (0–0, 1–1, 0–2)	(Latvia) HK Zemgale/LBTU	Patinoire Polesud, Grenoble; Attendance: 3,653

Game reference
6 min	Penalties	2 min
50	Shots	28

18 November 2023; 16:00	HK Zemgale/LBTU (Latvia)	2–5 (1–3, 0–1, 1–1)	(United Kingdom) Cardiff Devils	Patinoire Polesud, Grenoble; Attendance: 2,154

Game reference
14 min	Penalties	8 min
18	Shots	46

18 November 2023; 20:15	Brûleurs de Loups (France)	0–2 (0–1, 0–1, 0–0)	(Kazakhstan) Nomad Astana	Patinoire Polesud, Grenoble; Attendance: 3,724

Game reference
10 min	Penalties	10 min
52	Shots	16

19 November 2023; 15:00	Nomad Astana (Kazakhstan)	4–1 (1–0, 2–0, 1–1)	(Latvia) HK Zemgale/LBTU	Patinoire Polesud, Grenoble; Attendance: 2,074

Game reference
8 min	Penalties	6 min
23	Shots	33

19 November 2023; 19:15	Cardiff Devils (United Kingdom)	1–0 (0–0, 1–0, 0–0)	(France) Brûleurs de Loups	Patinoire Polesud, Grenoble; Attendance: 3,454

Game reference
6 min	Penalties	8 min
25	Shots	31

=== Group F ===
The Group F tournament was played in Cortina d'Ampezzo, Italy, from 17 to 19 November 2023.

Pos	Team	Pld	W	OTW	OTL	L	GF	GA	GD	Pts	Qualification
1	(Poland) GKS Katowice	3	2	0	1	0	15	7	+8	7	Final round
2	(Denmark) Herning Blue Fox	3	1	1	0	1	10	7	+3	5	Final round
3	(Italy) SG Cortina (H)	3	1	0	1	1	8	16	−8	4	
4	(Hungary) Ferencvárosi TC	3	0	1	0	2	10	13	−3	2	

Source: IIHF
(H) Host

All times are local (UTC+1).

17 November 2023; 16:30	GKS Katowice (Poland)	5–4 (1–1, 2–0, 2–3)	(Hungary) Ferencvárosi TC	Stadio olimpico del ghiaccio, Cortina d'Ampezzo; Attendance: 955

Game reference
8 min	Penalties	10 min
28	Shots	21

17 November 2023; 20:30	Herning Blue Fox (Denmark)	3–4 (2–1, 1–3, 0–0)	(Italy) SG Cortina	Stadio olimpico del ghiaccio, Cortina d'Ampezzo; Attendance: 955

Game reference
16 min	Penalties	8 min
24	Shots	31

18 November 2023; 16:30	Ferencvárosi TC (Hungary)	1–4 (0–0, 1–3, 0–1)	(Denmark) Herning Blue Fox	Stadio olimpico del ghiaccio, Cortina d'Ampezzo; Attendance: 1,117

Game reference
6 min	Penalties	6 min
21	Shots	36

18 November 2023; 20:30	GKS Katowice (Poland)	8–0 (5–0, 2–0, 1–0)	(Italy) SG Cortina	Stadio olimpico del ghiaccio, Cortina d'Ampezzo; Attendance: 1,340

Game reference
4 min	Penalties	16 min
39	Shots	16

19 November 2023; 16:30	Herning Blue Fox (Denmark)	3–2 OT (0–1, 0–0, 2–1) (OT: 1–0)	(Poland) GKS Katowice	Stadio olimpico del ghiaccio, Cortina d'Ampezzo; Attendance: 1,004

Game reference
2 min	Penalties	10 min
36	Shots	26

19 November 2023; 20:30	SG Cortina (Italy)	4–5 OT (1–1, 2–0, 1–3) (OT: 0–1)	(Hungary) Ferencvárosi TC	Stadio olimpico del ghiaccio, Cortina d'Ampezzo; Attendance: 1,004

Game reference
6 min	Penalties	10 min
29	Shots	42

== Final round ==
The final tournament was played in Cardiff, United Kingdom, from 12 to 14 January 2024.

Pos	Team	Pld	W	OTW	OTL	L	GF	GA	GD	Pts	
1	(Kazakhstan) Nomad Astana	3	3	0	0	0	15	5	+10	9	Continental Cup winners
2	(Denmark) Herning Blue Fox	3	1	0	1	1	10	15	−5	4	
3	(United Kingdom) Cardiff Devils (H)	3	1	0	0	2	8	11	−3	3	
4	(Poland) GKS Katowice	3	0	1	0	2	8	10	−2	2	

Source: IIHF
(H) Host

All times are local (UTC).

12 January 2024; 16:00	GKS Katowice (Poland)	5–4 GWS (1–2, 1–1, 2–1) (OT: 0–0) (SO: 1–0)	(Denmark) Herning Blue Fox	Vindico Arena, Cardiff; Attendance: 2,031

Game reference
4 min	Penalties	4 min
32	Shots	31

12 January 2024; 20:00	Nomad Astana (Kazakhstan)	5–2 (2–1, 1–1, 2–0)	(United Kingdom) Cardiff Devils	Vindico Arena, Cardiff; Attendance: 2,848

Game reference
6 min	Penalties	29 min
25	Shots	35

13 January 2024; 15:00	Herning Blue Fox (Denmark)	2–7 (0–4, 1–2, 1–1)	(Kazakhstan) Nomad Astana	Vindico Arena, Cardiff; Attendance: 2,123

Game reference
39 min	Penalties	35 min
19	Shots	26

13 January 2024; 19:00	GKS Katowice (Poland)	2–3 (1–2, 0–0, 1–1)	(United Kingdom) Cardiff Devils	Vindico Arena, Cardiff; Attendance: 3,012

Game reference
4 min	Penalties	4 min
29	Shots	35

14 January 2024; 15:00	Nomad Astana (Kazakhstan)	3–1 (0–0, 1–1, 2–0)	(Poland) GKS Katowice	Vindico Arena, Cardiff; Attendance: 2,235

Game reference
4 min	Penalties	8 min
22	Shots	26

14 January 2024; 19:00	Cardiff Devils (United Kingdom)	3–4 (2–2, 1–1, 0–1)	(Denmark) Herning Blue Fox	Vindico Arena, Cardiff; Attendance: 3,023

Game reference
12 min	Penalties	6 min
34	Shots	32
