= 2007 Kazakhstan Hockey Cup =

The 2007 Kazakhstan Hockey Cup was the 6th edition of the Kazakhstan Hockey Cup, the national ice hockey cup competition in Kazakhstan. Seven teams participated and Kazzinc-Torpedo won its 4th Cup.

== First round ==
Group A

	GP	W	OTW	OTL	L	GF:GA	Pts
Kazzinc-Torpedo	2	2	0	0	0	11:4	6
Gornyak Rudny	2	1	0	0	1	8:8	3
Saryarka Karagandy	2	0	0	0	2	3:10	0

Group B

	GP	W	OTW	OTL	L	GF:GA	Pts
Barys Astana-2	3	2	1	0	0	13:4	8
Kazakhmys Satpaev	3	2	0	1	0	19:9	7
Yertis Pavlodar	3	1	0	0	2	6:12	3
Kazzinc Torpedo U20	3	0	0	0	3	10:23	0

== Final round ==
Semifinals
Kazzinc-Torpedo	5
Kazakhmys Satpaev	2
Barys Astana	3
Gornyak Rudny	2

Final
Kazzinc-Torpedo	2
Barys Astana	1
3rd place game
Kazakhmys Satpaev	7
Gornyak Rudny	6
