= Sport in Astana =

City home to many sports teams

Astana is home to many sports teams.

== Football ==
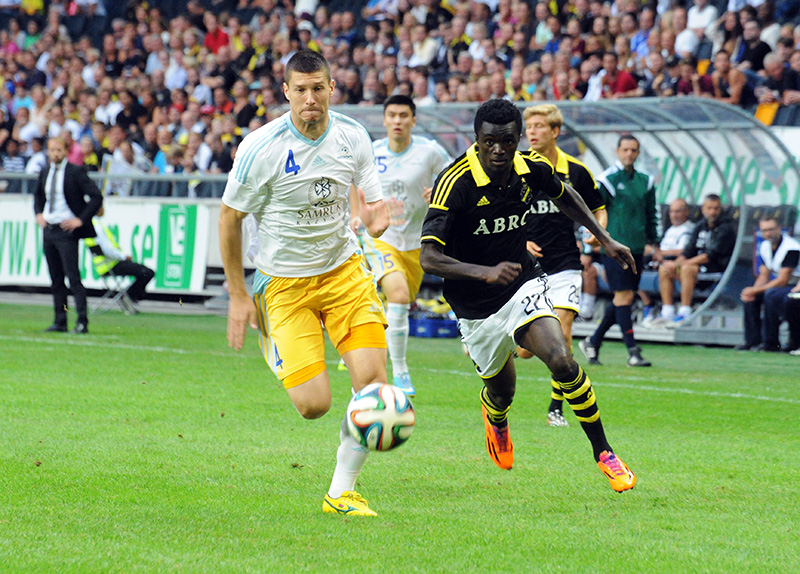
FC Astana - AIK UEFA Europa League game in 2014.

The city has a variety of sporting teams. The major association football team is FC Astana of the Kazakhstan Premier League. Founded in 2009, Astana won one Kazakhstan Premier League title, two Kazakhstan Cups and one Kazakhstan Super Cup. Their home ground is the Astana Arena, which is also serves as a home for the Kazakhstan national football team. The FC Astana-1964 is based in the Kazhimukan Munaitpasov Stadium and plays in the Kazakhstan First Division, the second tier of football in Kazakhstan. The club's most successful years were 2000s, when they won Kazakhstan Premier League for 3 times. The FC Bayterek is also plays in the Kazakhstan First Division. They were founded in 2012, to develop youth football.

Club	Founded	League	Venue	Head Coach
FC Astana	2009	Kazakhstan Premier League	Astana Arena	Stanimir Stoilov
FC Astana-1964	1964	Kazakhstan First Division	Kazhimukan Munaitpasov Stadium	Vakhid Masudov
FC Bayterek	2011	Kazakhstan First Division	Astana Arena	Andrei Kucheryavykh

== Ice hockey ==
Astana is home for several professional ice hockey teams. The Barys Astana, a founding member of the Kontinental Hockey League in 2008. The Nomad Astana and the HC Astana are play in the Kazakhstan Hockey Championship. The Snezhnye Barsy of the Junior Hockey League is a junior team of the Barys Astana. All of the teams are based in the Kazakhstan Sports Palace. Astana annually hosts the President of the Republic of Kazakhstan's Cup ice hockey tournament. The Barys Arena is an ice hockey venue under construction will be home arena for Barys Astana.

Club	Founded	League	Venue	Head Coach
Barys Nur-Sultan	1999	Kontinental Hockey League	Barys Arena	Andrei Nazarov
Nomad Nur-Sultan	2007	Kazakhstan Hockey Championship	Kazakhstan Sports Palace	Yuri Mikhailis
HC Astana	2011	Kazakhstan Hockey Championship	Kazakhstan Sports Palace	Anatili Chistyakov
Snezhnye Barsy	2011	Junior Hockey League	Kazakhstan Sports Palace	Galym Mambetaliyev

== Other sports teams ==
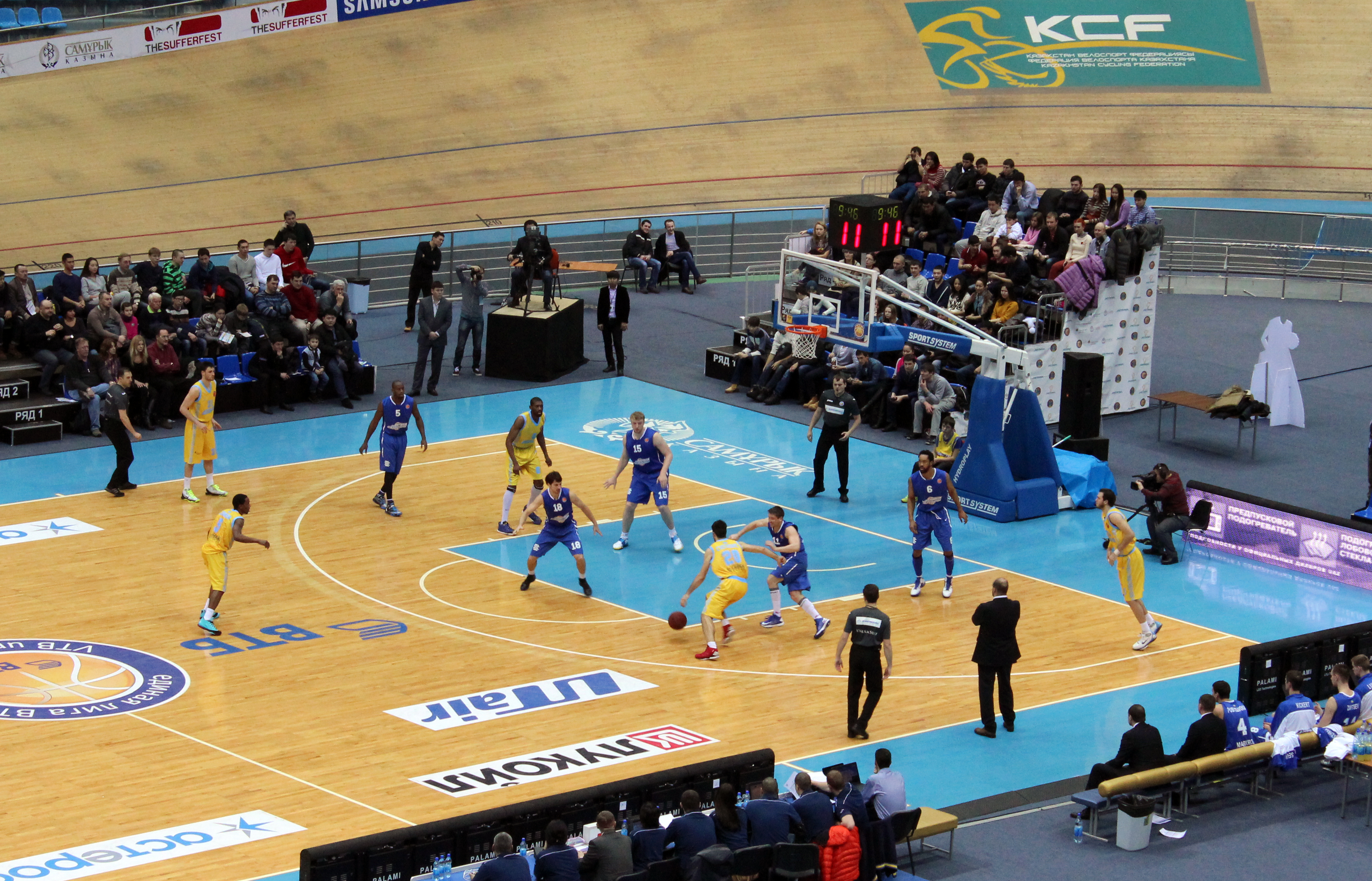
BC Astana - BC Azovmash VTB United League game in 2014.

The Astana Pro Team of the UCI World Tour, founded in 2006 to develop the brand "Astana" in the international sporting arena. The team is one of the most successful teams of recent years, winning several grand tours. The BC Astana of the VTB United League and the National Basketball League is the only basketball team in Astana. They are most crowned basketball team in Kazakhstan with 3 National Basketball League titles and 4 National Basketball Cups. Their home arena is the Saryarka Velodrome, which is mainly used for track cycling events. The Saryarka Velodrome hosted the UCI Track Cycling World Cup stage in 2011. The Astana Arlans are an amateur boxing team competing in the World Series of Boxing. Arlans became champions in the third edition of WSB in 2013. The Astana Presidential Sports Club was founded in 2012, to combine the main sports teams in Astana. The organization supported by Sovereign Wealth Fund Samruk-Kazyna. The 2011 Asian Winter Games were partly held in the capital. The Alau Ice Palace is annually hosts the ISU Speed Skating World Cup. The President's Cup tennis tournament annually held at the National Tennis Center Daulet. In 2014, Astana will open the National Paralympics Training Center for paralympic athletes in Kazakhstan. Although bandy is the only team sport in which Kazakhstan has brought home World Championship medals, it has just started to be played again in Astana. The city has organised both national championships for youth in rink bandy and in regular bandy for adults. After having been based in both Almaty and Oral, the seat of Kazakhstan Bandy Federation is now the in capital.

== Notable sports figures ==
- Alexander Achziger
- Anna Alyabyeva
- Larisa Bergen
- Maxim Iglinsky
- Valentin Iglinsky
- Arman Kamyshev
- Mark Starostin
- Gulzat Uralbayeva
- Maksim Zhalmagambetov
- Igor Zubrilin
