= Paul Eriksson =

Retired Swedish ice hockey player

- Born: April 26, 1991 (age 33); Gävle, Sweden
- Height: 5 ft 11 in (180 cm)
- Weight: 181 lb (82 kg; 12 st 13 lb)
- Position: Defence
- Shot: Right
- Played for: Lycksele (2009—2010); Timrå IK (2010—2011) → Kovlands (2010-2011); TUTO (2011—2012); Olimpiya (2011—2013); HCK (2012—2013) → Hunters (2012—2013); Izhstal (2013—2014); Glazov (2013—2014); Arystan (2014—2015); Södertälje (2015—2016) Valbo (2016—2017)
- Playing career: 2009–2010

Paul Eriksson (born April 26, 1991) is a retired Swedish professional ice hockey defenceman. He played in a number of leagues throughout his career, including the Elitserien, Mestis, and the MHL. Since his retirement in 2017, he has been coaching youth hockey.

== Early life ==
Eriksson was born in Gävle, Sweden in 1991. He has a sister. He is half Russian and his father works for Scania AB in St. Petersburg.

=== Youth teams ===
Eriksson played in the U16 SM (2006—2007), the J18 Elit (2006—2008), and the J18 Allsvenskan (2006—2008) for Djurgården before transferring to Södertälje (SSK) and playing in the J18 Elit (2008—2009), J18 Allsvenskan (2008—2009), and J20 SuperElit (2008—2010). He also played in the J20 SuperElit for Björklöven (2009—2010) and for Timrå (2010—2011) before going pro.

== Career ==
Eriksson played in Division 1 for Lycksele during the 2009—2010 season, then in the Elitserien for Timrå during 2010-2011. Timrå placed him on loan to Division 1 team Kovlands IF for the rest of the season. From there, he transferred into the Finnish Mestis league to play for TUTO (2011—2012). He moved to Russia to play in the MHL for Olimpiya during the 2011-2012 and 2012-2013 seasons. He also competed with the Mestis team HC Keski-Uusimaa during 2012—2013. He was placed on loan to Hunters in the Suomi-sarja during the season.

He started out the 2013—2014 season playing for the VHL team Izhstal after being scouted at an all-star game. In early 2014, a new coach joined the team and reduced Eriksson's playing time. The club went bankrupt following the season. For the 2014—2015 season, he joined Arystan Temirtau in the Kazakhstan Hockey Championship, where he competed in the Kazakhstan Hockey Cup. He also played junior hockey for Glazov.

During the 2015—2016 season, he returned to Allsvenskan team SSK, where he played youth hockey, on a tryout contract before being offered a more permanent position on the team. He played 43 games and scored 8 points. Eriksson signed with Valbo for the 2016—2017 season, which was planned as his last.

== Coaching career ==
Eriksson was the assistant coach of the Brynäs U16 team in the U16 Elit league in 2017—2018 and was the head coach for Strömsbro IF in 2021—2022.

== Personal life ==
Eriksson married his Russian girlfriend Maria on ice during an SSK training session in 2015. After retiring from professional hockey, he attended the Gävle University College and earned a degree in systems engineering.
