= 2012 Kazakhstan Hockey Cup =

Hockey cup competition in Kazakhstan

The 2012 Kazakhstan Hockey Cup was the 10th edition of the Kazakhstan Hockey Cup, the national ice hockey cup competition in Kazakhstan. Ten teams participated and Arlan Kokshetau won its 1st cup.

== First round ==
=== Group A ===
	GP	W	OTW	OTL	L	GF:GA	Pts
Beibarys Atyrau	4	4	0	0	0	15:3	12
HC Almaty	4	3	0	0	1	12:8	9
Arystan Temirtau	4	1	1	0	2	13:10	5
HC Astana	4	1	0	1	2	8:11	4
Kazzinc-Torpedo-2	4	0	0	0	4	9:25	0

=== Group B ===
	GP	W	OTW	OTL	L	GF:GA	Pts
Arlan Kokshetau	4	4	0	0	0	14:3	12
Yertis Pavlodar	4	3	0	0	1	10:7	9
Saryarka Karaganda-2	4	2	0	0	2	12:15	6
Barys Astana-2	4	1	0	0	3	7:11	3
Gornyak Rudny	4	0	0	0	4	9:16	0

== Final round ==
- Match for 3rd place:
- HC Almaty - Yertis Pavlodar 2-5
- Final:
- Beibarys Atyrau - Arlan Kokshetau 3-4 (OT)
