= Róbert Krajči =

Slovak ice hockey player

- Born: 2 February 1981 (age 44); Dubnica, Czechoslovakia
- Height: 1.76 m (5 ft 9 in)
- Weight: 83 kg (183 lb; 13 st 1 lb)
- Position: Forward
- Shoots: Left
- Slovak 1. Liga team Former teams: HK Dubnica; MsHK Žilina; Motor České Budějovice; HC Slovan Ústečtí Lvi; TH Unia Oświęcim; Arystan Temirtau; STS Sanok; Beibarys Atyrau; CSM Dunărea Galați
- Playing career: 1998–present

Róbert Krajči (born 2 February 1981 in Dubnica) is a Slovak professional ice hockey player currently playing for HK Dubnica of the Slovak 1. Liga.

Krajči previously played in the Slovak Extraliga for MsHK Žilina, the Czech Extraliga for Motor České Budějovice and HC Slovan Ústečtí Lvi and the Kazakhstan Hockey Championship for Arystan Temirtau, and Beibarys Atyrau.
