= Malevich (surname) =

Malevich, Malevič or Malewicz is a gender-neutral Slavic surname (Polish of Szeliga coat of arms, feminine Malewiczowa or Malewiczówna). Notable people with the surname include:

- Marianna Malińska, also called Malewiczówna (1767–1797), Polish ballerina
- Kazimir Malevich (1878–1935), painter and art theoretician
- Vladimir Malevich (born 1985), Russian ice hockey player

== See also ==
- Małujowice, named Malewicz in 1288, a village in south-western Poland
- Lt. Malewicz, a character from Three Stories (1953 film)
