= Krajčí =

Krajči or Krajčí (feminine: Krajčiová or Krajčíová) is a surname. Notable people with the surname include:

- Helena Krajčiová (born 1975), Slovak actress and singer
- Marek Krajčí (born 1974), Slovak politician
- Řehoř Krajčí (died 1474), Bohemian reformer and one of the founders of the Unity of Czech Brethren
- Róbert Krajči, Slovak professional ice hockey player
