= Alexander Berezensky =

Kazakhstani ice hockey player

- Born: 15 August 1979 (age 45); Karaganda, Kazakh SSR, USSR
- Height: 1.76 m (5 ft 9 in)
- Weight: 86 kg (190 lb; 13 st 8 lb)
- Position: Defence
- Shot: Right
- KAZ team: Arystan Temirtau
- Playing career: 1996–2015

Alexander Grigorevich Berezensky (Russian: Александр Григорьевич Березенский; born 15 August 1979 in Karaganda) is a Kazakhstani retired ice hockey player. During his career he played for several teams, including Arystan Temirtau in the Kazakhstan Hockey Championship league.
