= Nikita Mikhailis =

Kazakhstani ice hockey player (born 1995)

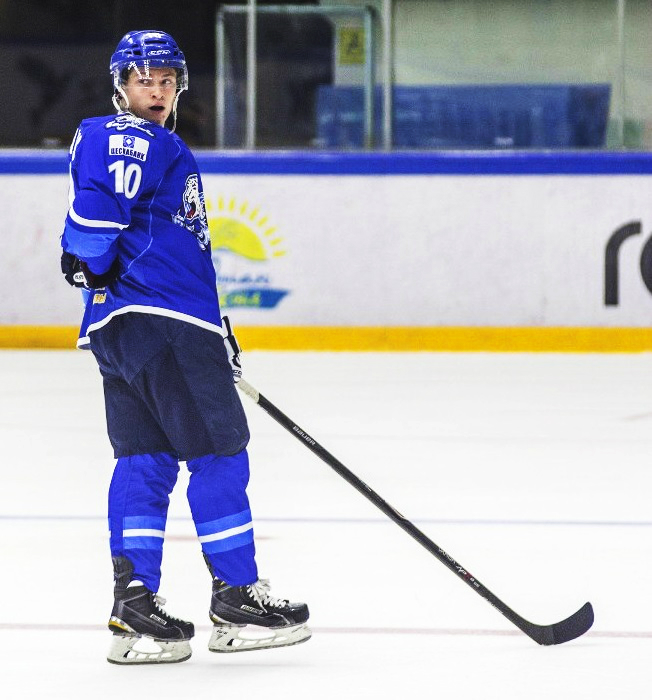
- Mikhailis with Barys in 2015.
- Born: June 18, 1995 (age 31) Karagandy, Kazakhstan
- Height: 5 ft 8 in (173 cm)
- Weight: 173 lb (78 kg; 12 st 5 lb)
- Position: Forward
- Shoots: Right
- KHL team Former teams: Metallurg Magnitogorsk; Barys Astana
- National team: Kazakhstan
- Playing career: 2011–present

Nikita Yurevich Mikhailis (Russian: Никита Юрьевич Михайлис; born June 18, 1995) is a Kazakhstani professional ice hockey forward who is currently playing for Metallurg Magnitogorsk in the Kontinental Hockey League (KHL). Mikhailis began playing professionally at the age of 16 with the Nomad Astana of the Kazakhstan Hockey Championship. He played one season with Nomad, during which time he was selected 121st overall by the Barys in the 2012 KHL Junior Draft. In 2012, he began playing major junior hockey with the Barys' junior league affiliate Snezhnye Barsy of the Junior Hockey League (MHL) for three seasons. In 2014–15, he began playing for Barys and register 4 points in the regular season.

== Playing career ==
Mikhailis developed with the Nomad Astana of the Kazakhstan Hockey Championship, joined the senior team at age of 16. After recording 25 points over 50 games in 2011–12 with Nomad, Barys decided to receive rights to him selecting 121st overall in the fourth round of the 2012 KHL Junior Draft. In 2012, he joined its affiliate Snezhnye Barsy in the Junior Hockey League (MHL). In his inaugural season in MHL, he recorded 37 points in 60 games, the second highest record in the team. Mikhailis stayed with Snezhnye Barsy another season and recorded a junior career-high 45 points in 56 games. During 2014 pre-season, Mikhailis named the first candidate to be a limit player in coming season at Barys. On September 6, 2014, he made his KHL debut in the match against the Amur Khabarovsk. On September 8, 2014, Mikhailis suffered a broken collarbone in a game against the Admiral Vladivostok. He recorded his first point, an assist, on December 30 against the Traktor Chelyabinsk. Later, he scored his first KHL goal, a game winner against Jakub Kovar in a 4–1 win against the Avtomobilist Yekaterinburg on January 10. He completed the season with 2 goals and 2 points over 23 games. He also played 4 games for Snezhnye Barsy in MHL.

Following his ninth season with Barys, having captained the club in the 2022–23 campaign, Mikhailis left as a free agent and was signed to continue his career in the KHL with Russian club, Metallurg Magnitogorsk, on a one-year contract on 30 May 2023.

== International play ==
Mikhailis made his international debut with Kazakhstan in Division IB of the 2012 IIHF World U18 Championships, held in Hungary. With 9 points, he was the second top scorer in the tournament, helping Kazakhstan to second place in their pool. At the 2013 IIHF World U18 Championships, Kazakhstan finished first in their Division IB, earning a promotion to the Division IA for the following year. Recording six goals and twelve points over five games, he became tournament's second top scorer.

Mikhailis advanced to the under-20 level, playing in Division IB of the 2013 World Junior Championships, held in Ukraine. He scored 1 goal and 3 assist in 5 matches as Kazakhstan finished second in their group to Poland, missing out on a promotion to the main tournament for the following year. In December 2013, Mikhailis made his second appearance at the under-20 level in the 2014 IIHF World Junior Championships' Division I tournament, held in Great Britain. Finishing with 11 points over 5 games, he became tournament's top scorer. At his third appearance for the under-20 team at the 2015 IIHF World Junior Championships, held in Hungary, Mikhailis helped Kazakhstan to promote to Division IA and became tournament's top scorer with 11 points.

In January 2023, he became the author of the most beautiful puck in a week according to the Kontinental Hockey League. He scored the decisive goal in overtime, which brought victory to Barys – 3:2.

== Personal life ==
Mikhailis was born in Karagandy, Kazakhstan. His father, Yuri Mikhailis, is a former ice hockey player and currently the head coach of the Nomad Astana of the Kazakhstan Hockey Championship. Mikhailis began to play hockey in Orsk, while his father played there for Yuzhny Ural.

== Career statistics ==
=== Regular season and playoffs ===
			Regular season					Playoffs
Season	Team	League	GP	G	A	Pts	PIM	GP	G	A	Pts	PIM
2011–12	Nomad Astana	KAZ	50	14	11	25	6	—	—	—	—	—
2012–13	Snezhnye Barsy Astana	MHL	60	19	18	37	10	—	—	—	—	—
2013–14	Snezhnye Barsy Astana	MHL	56	29	16	45	20	3	2	2	4	0
2014–15	Snezhnye Barsy Astana	MHL	4	0	1	1	2	—	—	—	—	—
2014–15	Barys Astana	KHL	23	3	2	4	5	7	0	0	0	0
2015–16	Barys Astana	KHL	23	1	1	2	4	—	—	—	—	—
2015–16	Nomad Astana	KAZ	26	13	16	29	8	—	—	—	—	—
2016–17	Barys Astana	KHL	10	0	3	3	0	—	—	—	—	—
2016–17	Nomad Astana	KAZ	3	1	3	4	0	—	—	—	—	—
2016–17	Torpedo Ust-Kamenogorsk	VHL	30	14	8	22	10	8	3	1	4	0
2017–18	Barys Astana	KHL	33	6	7	13	8	—	—	—	—	—
2017–18	Nomad Astana	KAZ	6	5	8	13	2	4	2	3	5	0
2018–19	Barys Astana	KHL	62	17	18	35	10	12	1	5	6	0
2018–19	Nomad Astana	KAZ	—	—	—	—	—	7	2	6	8	0
2019–20	Barys Nur-Sultan	KHL	60	17	15	32	4	5	0	1	1	0
2020–21	Barys Nur-Sultan	KHL	59	19	15	34	39	6	1	2	3	8
2021–22	Barys Nur-Sultan	KHL	47	18	26	44	10	5	1	1	2	2
2022–23	Barys Astana	KHL	58	15	26	41	8	—	—	—	—	—
2023–24	Metallurg Magnitogorsk	KHL	64	19	19	38	8	23	2	2	4	0
2024–25	Metallurg Magnitogorsk	KHL	63	12	24	36	10	6	2	1	3	0
2025–26	Metallurg Magnitogorsk	KHL	64	18	23	41	12	15	5	4	9	2
KHL totals			566	144	179	323	117	80	13	16	29	12

=== International ===
Year	Team	Event	Result	GP	G	A	Pts	PIM
2012	Kazakhstan	U18-I	DNQ	5	5	4	9	0
2013	Kazakhstan	U18-I	P	5	6	6	12	2
2013	Kazakhstan	WJC-I	DNQ	5	1	3	4	0
2014	Kazakhstan	WJC-I	DNQ	5	6	5	11	0
2015	Kazakhstan	WJC-I	P	5	5	6	11	0
2017	Kazakhstan	WC-I	DNQ	5	2	0	2	0
2018	Kazakhstan	WC-I	19th	5	1	1	2	0
2019	Kazakhstan	WC-I	17th	5	4	2	6	0
2020	Kazakhstan	OGQ	DNQ	3	0	1	1	2
2021	Kazakhstan	WC	10th	7	3	2	5	0
2022	Kazakhstan	WC	14th	7	2	4	6	6
2023	Kazakhstan	WC	11th	7	2	3	5	0
2024	Kazakhstan	WC	12th	7	1	2	3	0
2024	Kazakhstan	OGQ	DNQ	3	4	0	4	0
2025	Kazakhstan	WC	15th	7	3	2	5	0
Junior totals				20	23	24	47	2
Senior totals				56	22	17	39	8

== Awards and honours ==
Award	Year
KHL
Gagarin Cup (Metallurg Magnitogorsk)	2024
International
Top Scorer – IIHF World U20 Division I (Division IB)	2014, 2015
