= HC Kaunas City =

Former ice hockey team in Kaunas, Lithuania

Kaunas City
- City: Kaunas, Lithuania
- League: OHL
- Founded: 2021
- Folded: 2024
- Home arena: Kaunas Ice Arena
- Colours: Dark green, green, white

Franchise history
- 2021–present: HC Kaunas City

HC Kaunas City was a professional ice hockey team located in Kaunas, Lithuania, which played in the Latvian Hockey Higher League, the top tier of ice hockey in Latvia. The team played its home games at Kaunas Ice Arena.

== History ==
Kaunas City was founded in 2021 after the demise of Baltų Ainiai Kaunas and Kaunas Hockey teams, and was linked with the BC Žalgiris basketball club. In the 2021–22 Lithuania Hockey League season, its debut season, the team finished in third place. For the 2022–23 season, Kaunas City, along with Energija Elektrėnai and Hockey Punks Vilnius, joined the Latvian Hockey Higher League. In the regular season the team finished in third place and in the playoffs were eliminated 3–2 by Dinamo Riga in the quarterfinals. After its elimination from the playoffs, Kaunas City played a best-of-five series against Energija Elektrėnai for Lithuania Hockey League championship, winning the series in three games, and also qualifying for the 2023–24 IIHF Continental Cup.

After winning silver in the Lithuanian championship finals in March 2024, the team folded by August 2024, as it did not appear in the list of the confirmed participants of the 2024–25 OHL season.

== Season-by-season record ==
Season	League	GP	W	SOW	SOL	L	GF	GA	GD	Pts	Finish	Playoffs
2021–22	LHL	20	12	1	2	5	146	68	+78	40	3rd	Did not qualify
2022–23	OHL	32	13	0	1	18	133	153	–20	27	6th	Lost in quarterfinals, 2–3 (DRG)
2023–24	OHL	32	9	3	1	19	113	147	–34	25	7th	Did not qualify

== Honours ==
- Lithuania Hockey League champions – 2022–23
