= 2004 Kazakhstan Hockey Cup =

The 2004 Kazakhstan Hockey Cup was the 3rd edition of the Kazakhstan Hockey Cup, the national ice hockey cup competition in Kazakhstan. Four teams participated and Kazzinc-Torpedo won its 3rd cup.

== Results ==
| | GP | W | T | L | GF:GA | Pts |
|---|---|---|---|---|---|---|
| Kazzinc-Torpedo | 3 | 3 | 0 | 0 | 21:4 | 6 |
| Kazakhmys Karagandy | 3 | 2 | 0 | 1 | 18:4 | 4 |
| Yenbek Almaty | 3 | 1 | 0 | 2 | 8:15 | 2 |
| Barys Astana | 3 | 0 | 0 | 3 | 2:26 | 0 |
