= Kazakhstan Hockey Cup =

Kazakh national ice hockey cup

- Current season, competition or edition: 2025 Kazakhstan Hockey Cup
- Sport: Ice hockey
- Founded: 2002
- Country: Kazakhstan
- Most recent champion: Arlan Kokshetau (4th title)
- Most titles: Kazzinc-Torpedo, Arlan Kokshetau (4)
- Website: www.icehockey.kz

The Kazakhstan Hockey Cup is the national ice hockey cup in Kazakhstan awarded to the winner of the Kazakhstan Hockey Championship playoffs. The trophy was first awarded in 2002. Kazzinc-Torpedo and Arlan Kokshetau have won the most cups with four each.

== Winners ==
- 2025: Arlan Kokshetau
- 2024: Arlan Kokshetau
- 2023: Nomad Astana
- 2022: Saryarka Karaganda
- 2021: Saryarka Karaganda
- 2020: Delayed to Feb 2021 due to Covid-19
- 2019: Altay Torpedo
- 2018: Altay Torpedo
- 2017: Kulager Petropavl
- 2016: Kulager Petropavl
- 2015: Gornyak Rudny
- 2014: Yertis Pavlodar
- 2013: Arlan Kokshetau
- 2012: Arlan Kokshetau
- 2011: Arystan Temirtau
- 2010: Gornyak Rudny
- 2009: No event
- 2008: Kazakhmys Satpaev
- 2007: Kazzinc-Torpedo
- 2006: Kazakhmys Satpaev
- 2005: Kazakhmys Satpaev
- 2004: Kazzinc-Torpedo
- 2003: Kazzinc-Torpedo
- 2002: Kazzinc-Torpedo

== See also ==
- Kazakhstan Hockey Championship
