= Alexander Nesterov =

Russian ice hockey player (born 1985)

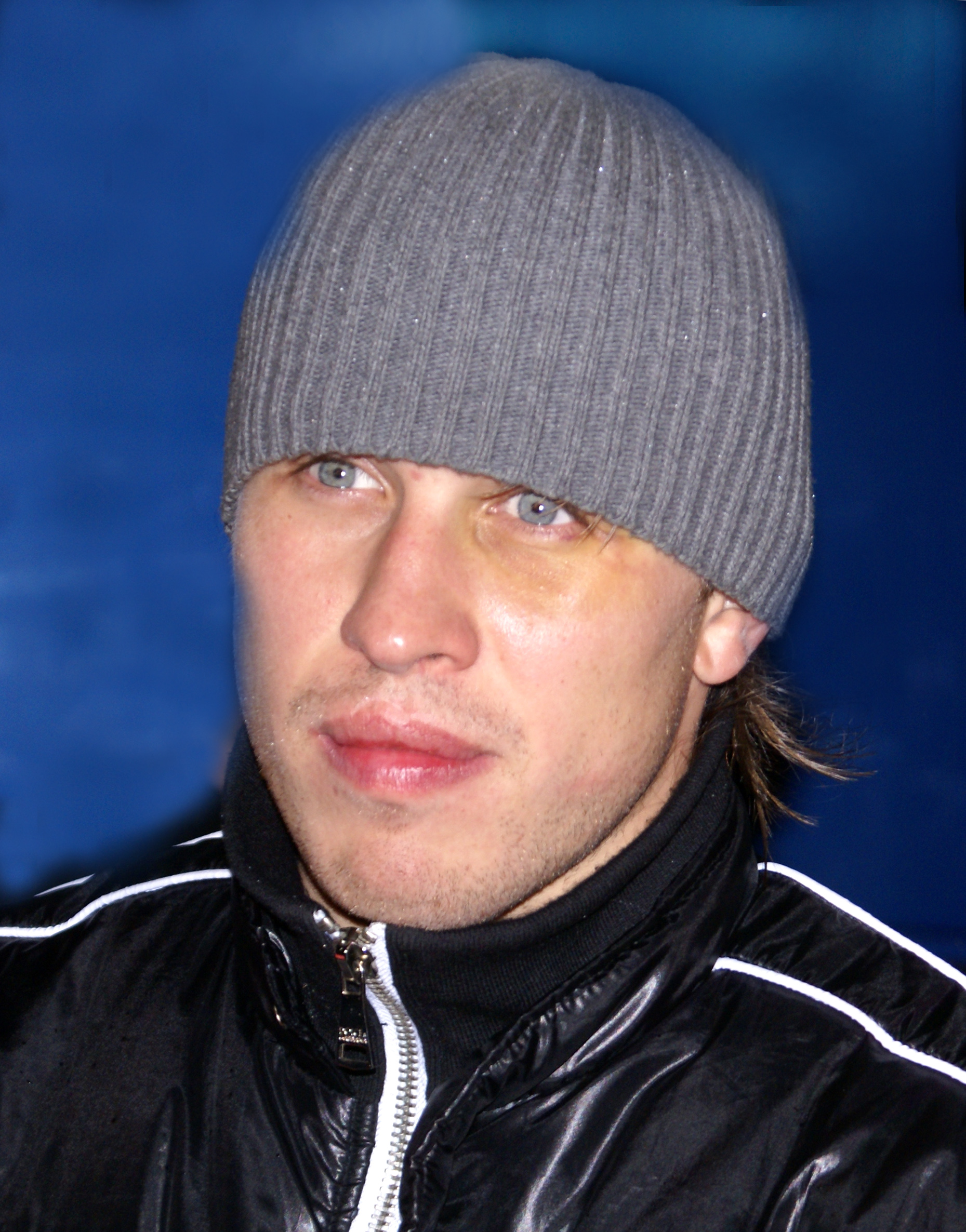
- Born: September 30, 1985 (age 40) Moscow, Russian SFSR
- Height: 5 ft 11 in (180 cm)
- Weight: 194 lb (88 kg; 13 st 12 lb)
- Position: Right wing
- Shoots: Left
- KHC team Former teams: Arlan Kokshetau; Atlant Mytishchi; Avangard Omsk; Spartak Moscow; Sibir Novosibirsk; Admiral Vladivostok; Avtomobilist Yekaterinburg; Salavat Yulaev Ufa; Lada Togliatti
- Playing career: 2005–present

Alexander Yuryevich Nesterov (born September 30, 1985) is a former Russian professional ice hockey forward. He formerly played with HC Lada Togliatti in the Kontinental Hockey League (KHL).
