= Yuri Mikhailis =

Kazakhstani ice hockey player

- Born: April 23, 1969 Karagandy, Kazakh SSR, Soviet Union
- Height: 5 ft 10 in (178 cm)
- Weight: 183 lb (83 kg; 13 st 1 lb)
- Position: Defence
- Played for: Avtomobilist Karagandy; Avtomobilist Yekaterinburg; Rubin Tyumen; Yuzhny Ural Orsk; Kazakhmys Karagandy
- Playing career: 1992–2005

Yuri Vladimirovich Mikhailis (Russian: Юрий Владимирович Михайлис; born April 23, 1969) is a retired Kazakhstani professional ice hockey player and ice hockey coach. He is currently the head coach of Nomad Astana of the Kazakhstan Hockey Championship. His son, Nikita Mikhailis, plays for Metallurg Magnitogorsk of the Kontinental Hockey League.
