= Patinoire Charlemagne =

Ice rink in Lyon, France

Coordinates: 45°44′33″N 4°49′11″E

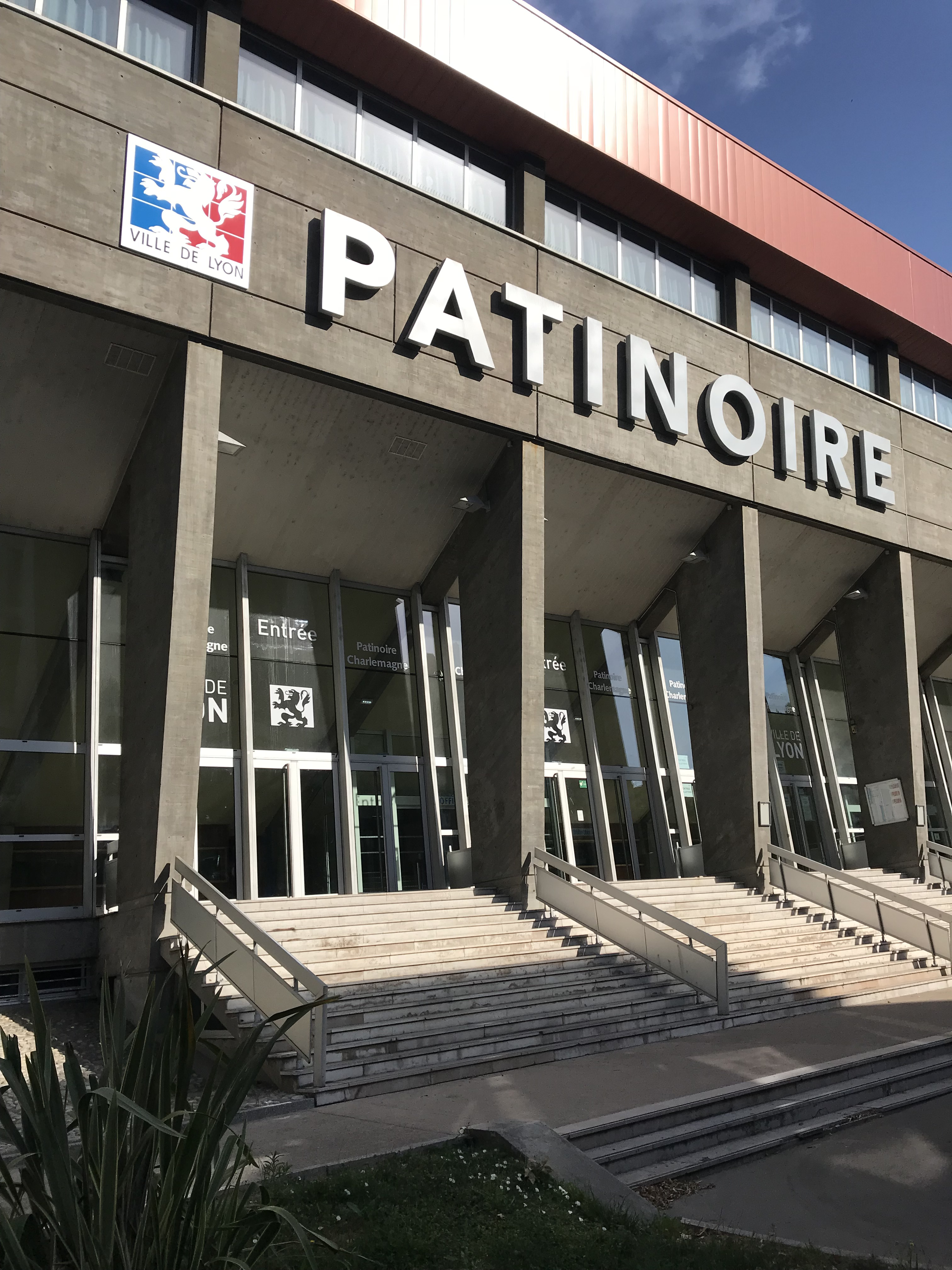
Patinoire Charlemagne (juin 2018) - 2

The Patinoire Charlemagne is an ice rink in Lyon, France, located in the Confluence quarter, in the 2nd arrondissement of Lyon. It hosts many international competitions, such as the European Championships of figure skating, and entertainments and is reserved for various sports including figure skating, hockey, and curling. It is also the seat of the Lyon Hockey Club and the Club des Sports de Glace de Lyon, the club of Olympic champions Marina Anissina and Gwendal Peizerat, and world champions Isabelle Delobel and Olivier Shoenfelder.

It was ordered in 1967 to architects R. Roustit and C. Batton, assisted by G. Morel, on the occasion of the candidature of Lyon in the Olympic Games, and was built with plans of 1963. It was inaugurated in April 1969 and opened to public in September 1969.

This is one of the largest rinks in France: it has indeed Olympic-size, namely 60 x 30 meters. The building is 80 x 70 meters at ground level and the roof tilted toward the rear of the building is 72 meters long. The materials of the buildings are reinforced concrete, glass and aluminum. The rink is composed of a skating rink, technological offices, stands with 5000 seats (3200 seated places), a large hall, changing rooms specialist, a bar and a room for meetings, gyms and dance. It has about 400,000 entries each year.

The patinoire Charlemagne architecture was reused for other sport buildings in Lyon area, including pools of Vaise and Mermoz, both built in 1969. The ice rink is listed in the Rhône-Alpes inventory of twentieth-century buildings which has an architectural interest and whose value should be enhanced.

The building had major expansions in 2001. It was also the subject of a renovation from 1 May to 15 September 2006 with a cost of 3.7 million euro. These renovations mainly concerned the roof (1980 m^{2} of covered area), the acoustic treatment and security in case of fire.
