= Jesse Rohtla =

Finnish ice hockey player

- Born: March 8, 1988 (age 37); Lahti, Finland
- Height: 5 ft 9 in (175 cm)
- Weight: 172 lb (78 kg; 12 st 4 lb)
- Position: Centre
- Shoots: Left
- PHL team Former teams: GKS Katowice; Lahti Pelicans
- NHL draft: Undrafted
- Playing career: 2008–present

Jesse Rohtla (born March 8, 1988) is a Finnish ice hockey player. He is currently playing for GKS Katowice of the Polska Hokej Liga.

Rohtla made his SM-liiga debut playing with Lahti Pelicans during the 2008–09 SM-liiga season.

== Career statistics ==
			Regular season					Playoffs
Season	Team	League	GP	G	A	Pts	PIM	GP	G	A	Pts	PIM
2003–04	Kiekkoreipas U16	U16 SM-sarja	22	9	18	27	20	—	—	—	—	—
2004–05	Kiekkoreipas U18	U18 SM-sarja	29	7	15	22	18	3	0	0	0	0
2005–06	Kiekkoreipas U18	U18 SM-sarja	5	2	2	4	18	—	—	—	—	—
2005–06	Lahti Pelicans U20	U20 SM-liiga	31	5	7	12	34	—	—	—	—	—
2006–07	Lahti Pelicans U20	U20 SM-liiga	39	11	29	40	59	15	3	9	12	28
2007–08	Lahti Pelicans U20	U20 SM-liiga	18	4	11	15	47	—	—	—	—	—
2007–08	Suomi U20	Mestis	9	3	4	7	10	—	—	—	—	—
2008–09	Lahti Pelicans U20	U20 SM-liiga	10	2	11	13	6	4	0	0	0	0
2008–09	Lahti Pelicans	SM-liiga	8	0	1	1	0	—	—	—	—	—
2008–09	HeKi	Mestis	29	6	13	19	18	—	—	—	—	—
2009–10	Mikkelin Jukurit	Mestis	45	7	21	28	14	4	0	0	0	4
2010–11	HeKi	Mestis	20	5	8	13	22	—	—	—	—	—
2010–11	Lahti Pelicans	SM-liiga	30	3	5	8	10	—	—	—	—	—
2011–12	Mikkelin Jukurit	Mestis	42	11	17	28	26	1	0	0	0	0
2012–13	Mikkelin Jukurit	Mestis	44	11	20	31	26	7	3	5	8	4
2013–14	Mikkelin Jukurit	Mestis	54	12	21	33	47	16	4	7	11	6
2014–15	Lahti Pelicans	Liiga	38	4	6	10	14	—	—	—	—	—
2015–16	Kulager Petropavl	Kazakhstan	15	3	6	9	6	—	—	—	—	—
2015–16	HC Neman Grodno	Belarus	10	0	5	5	6	12	5	3	8	37
2016–17	Asplöven HC	Hockeyettan	37	14	21	35	45	—	—	—	—	—
2017–18	KH GKS Katowice	Poland	38	13	40	53	34	14	1	7	8	10
2018–19	KH GKS Katowice	Poland	42	22	22	44	36	15	4	8	12	26
2019–20	JKH GKS Jastrzebie	Poland	26	12	16	28	16	7	1	3	4	4
2020–21	KH GKS Katowice	Poland	32	7	14	21	30	14	1	2	3	12
SM-liiga totals			76	7	12	19	24	—	—	—	—	—
Mestis totals			243	55	104	159	163	28	7	12	19	14
Poland totals			138	54	92	146	116	50	7	20	27	52
