= Stadio olimpico del ghiaccio =

Ice stadium in Cortina d'Ampezzo, Italy

Coordinates: 46°32′40″N 12°07′59″E

Stadio Olimpico del Ghiaccio
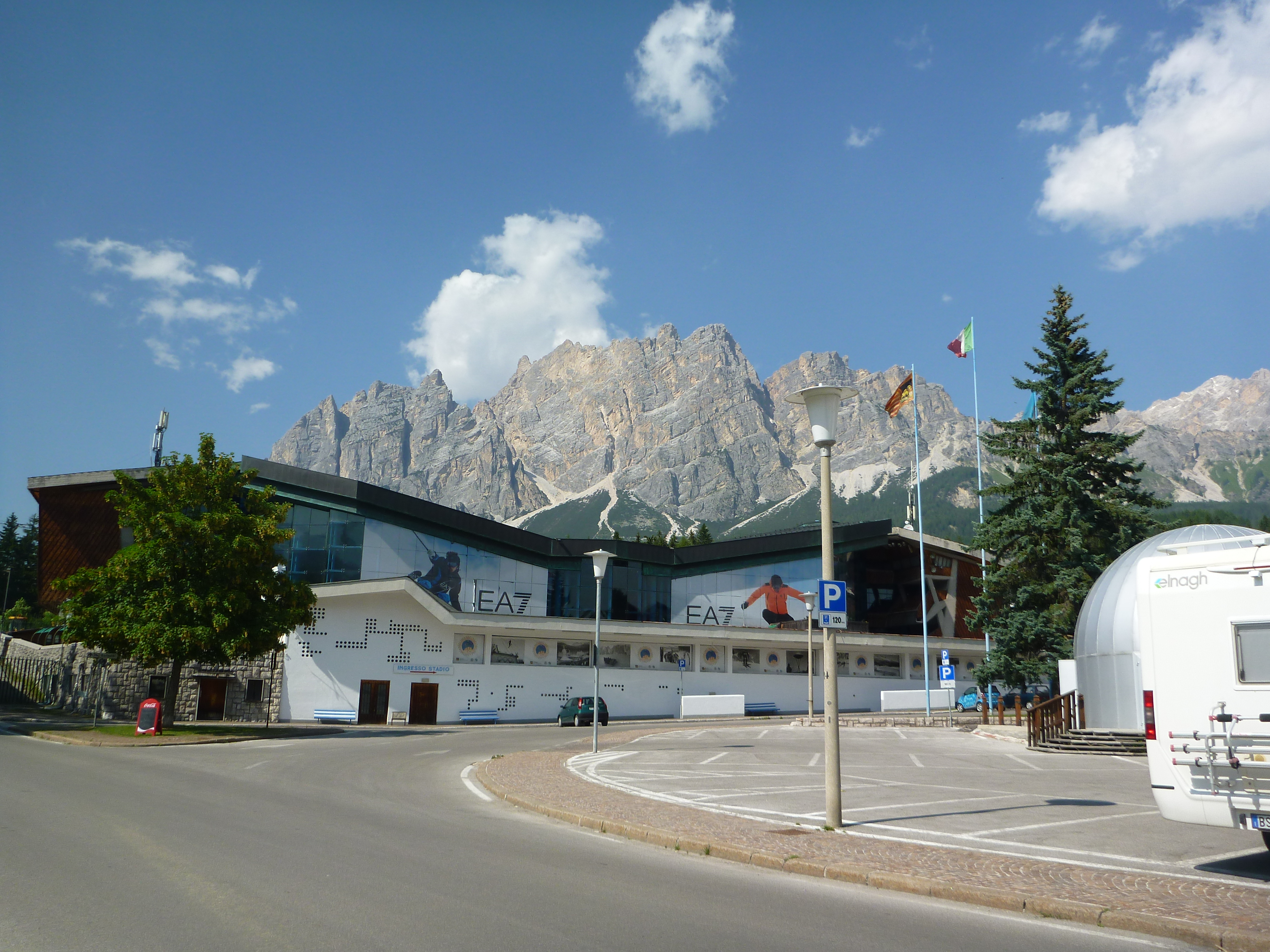
- Olympic Ice Stadium in Summer 2013
- Interactive map of Stadio Olimpico del Ghiaccio
- Location: Cortina d'Ampezzo, Italy

Construction
- Built: 1952–1954
- Opened: 26 October 1955
- Architects: Mario Ghedina, Francesco Uras, Riccardo Nalli

Tenant
- Piemont Rebelles (IHLW)

Stadio Olimpico del Ghiaccio (English: Olympic Ice Stadium) is an indoor stadium in Cortina d'Ampezzo, Italy.

== History ==
It was built between 1952 and 1954, primarily as an open air figure skating arena in Cortina d'Ampezzo, Italy, to hold between seven and eight thousand spectators, with the possibility of making temporary arrangements to accommodate twelve to fifteen thousand for the period of the Olympics. The venue was inaugurated on 26 October 1955. During the 1956 Winter Olympics, the arena held the opening and closing ceremonies, the figure skating events and select ice hockey games.

Sometime after 1981, a roof was added to the structure. The stadium hosted curling during the 2026 Winter Olympics, and it also hosted wheelchair curling and the closing ceremony of the 2026 Winter Paralympics.

== In popular culture ==
The stadium is shown in the 1981 James Bond movie For Your Eyes Only, where Bond (played by Roger Moore) met with the villainous Aris Kristatos (Julian Glover), and Kristatos tries to trick Bond into pursuing and killing his rival Milos Columbo (Topol).

== Gallery ==
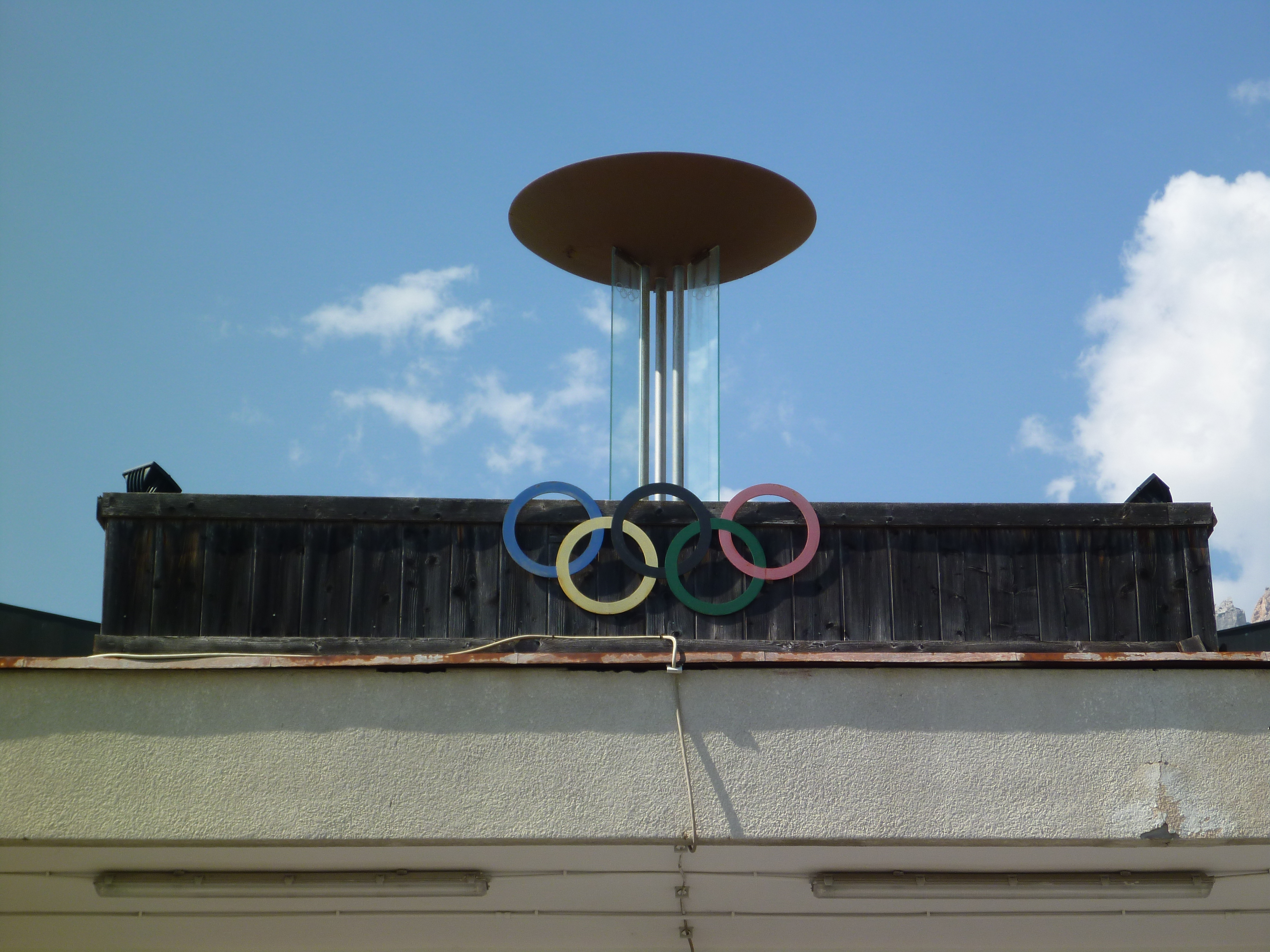
The Olympic cauldron from the 1956 Winter Olympics.

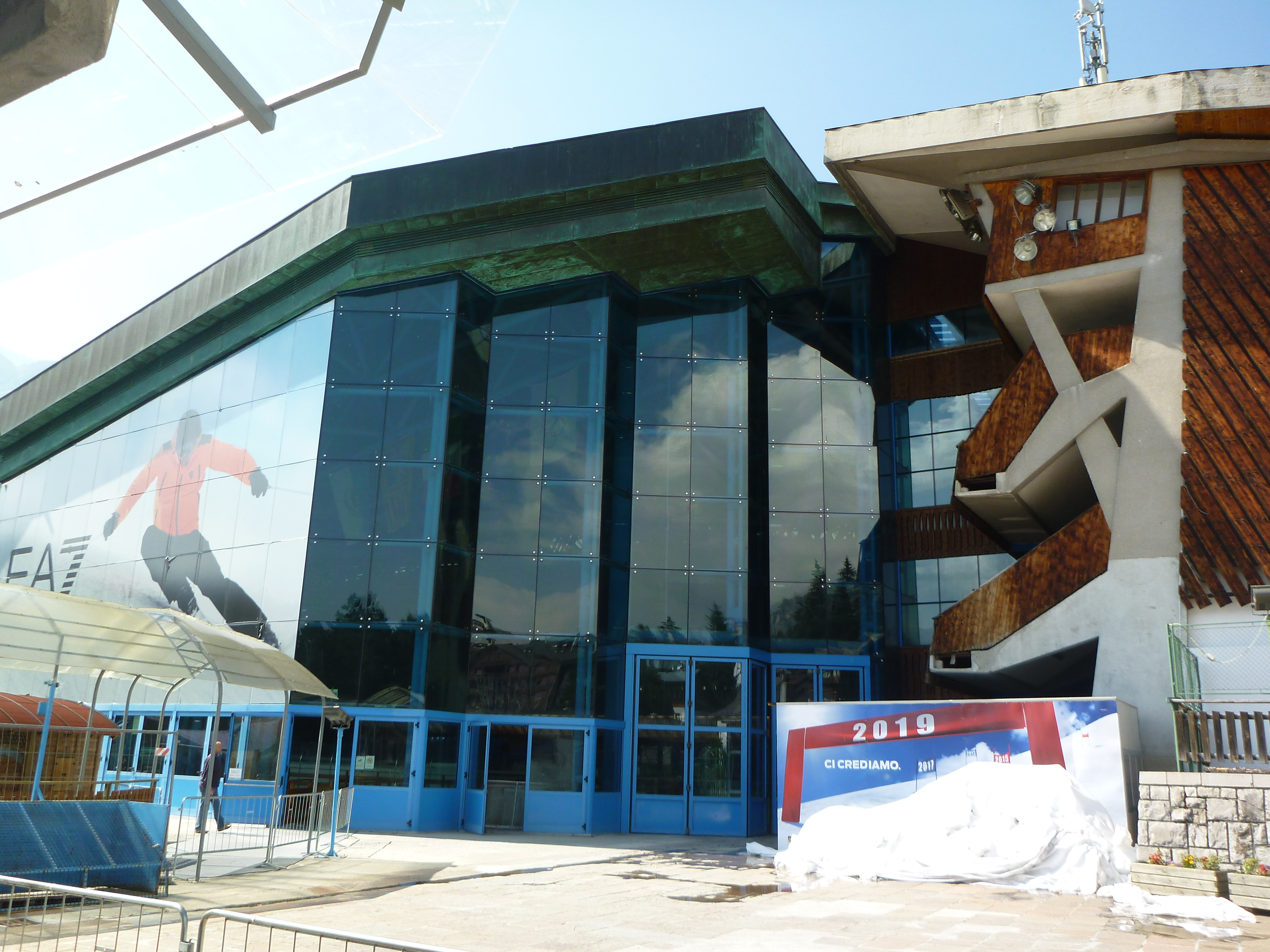
Stadium entrance

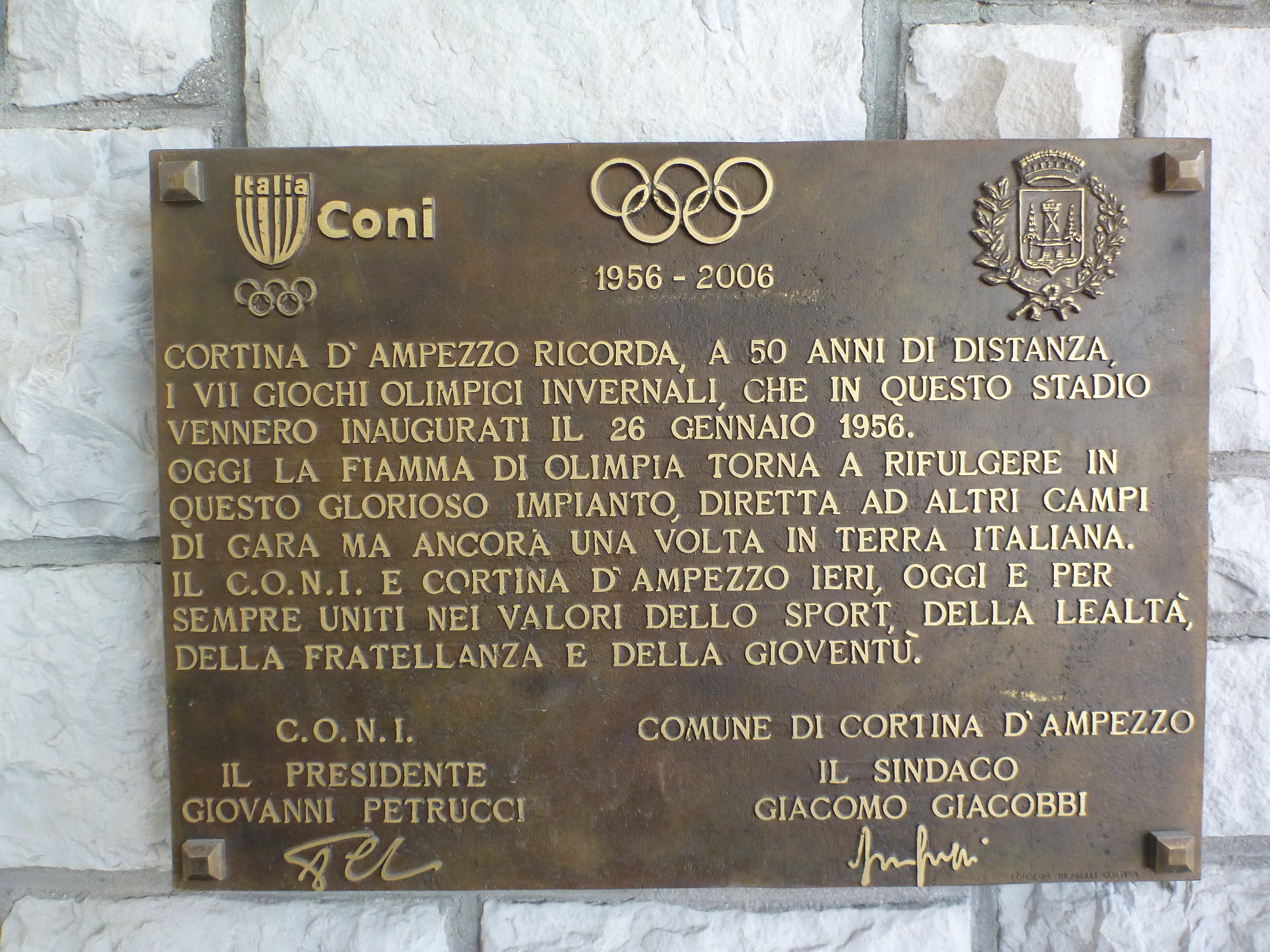
Plaque commemorating the fiftieth anniversary of the 1956 Winter Olympics

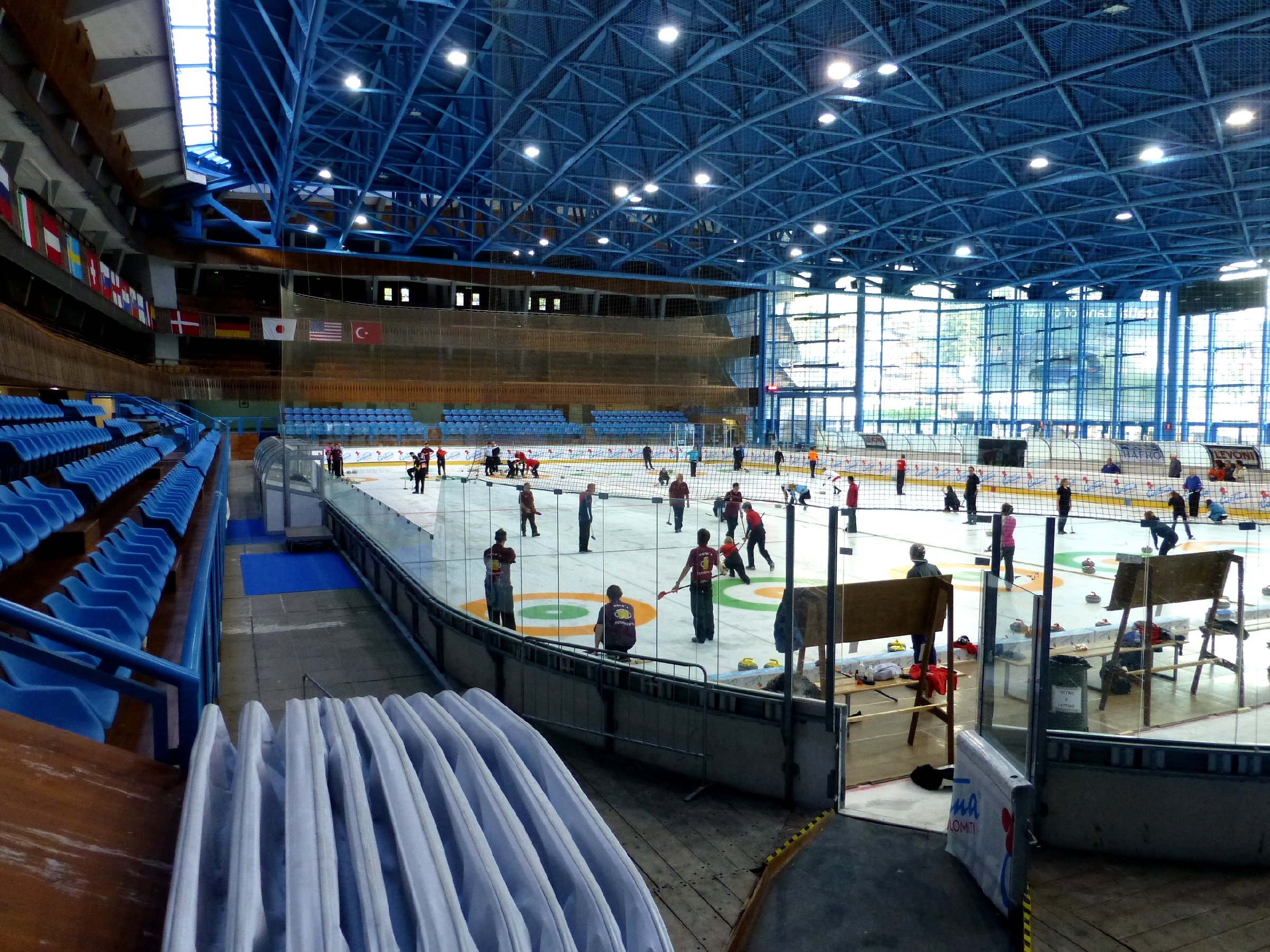
Inside the stadium

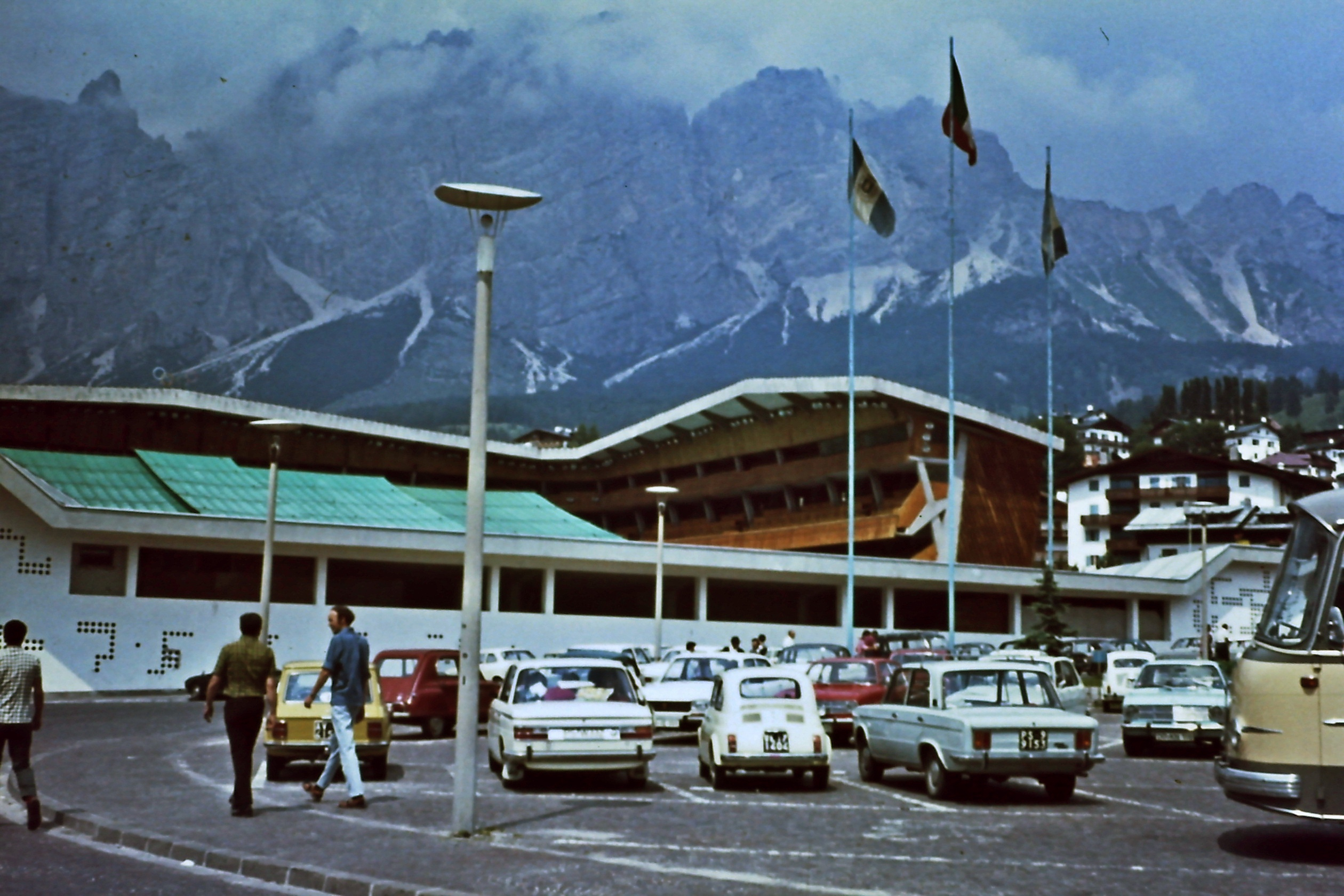
Olympic Ice Stadium in Summer 1971

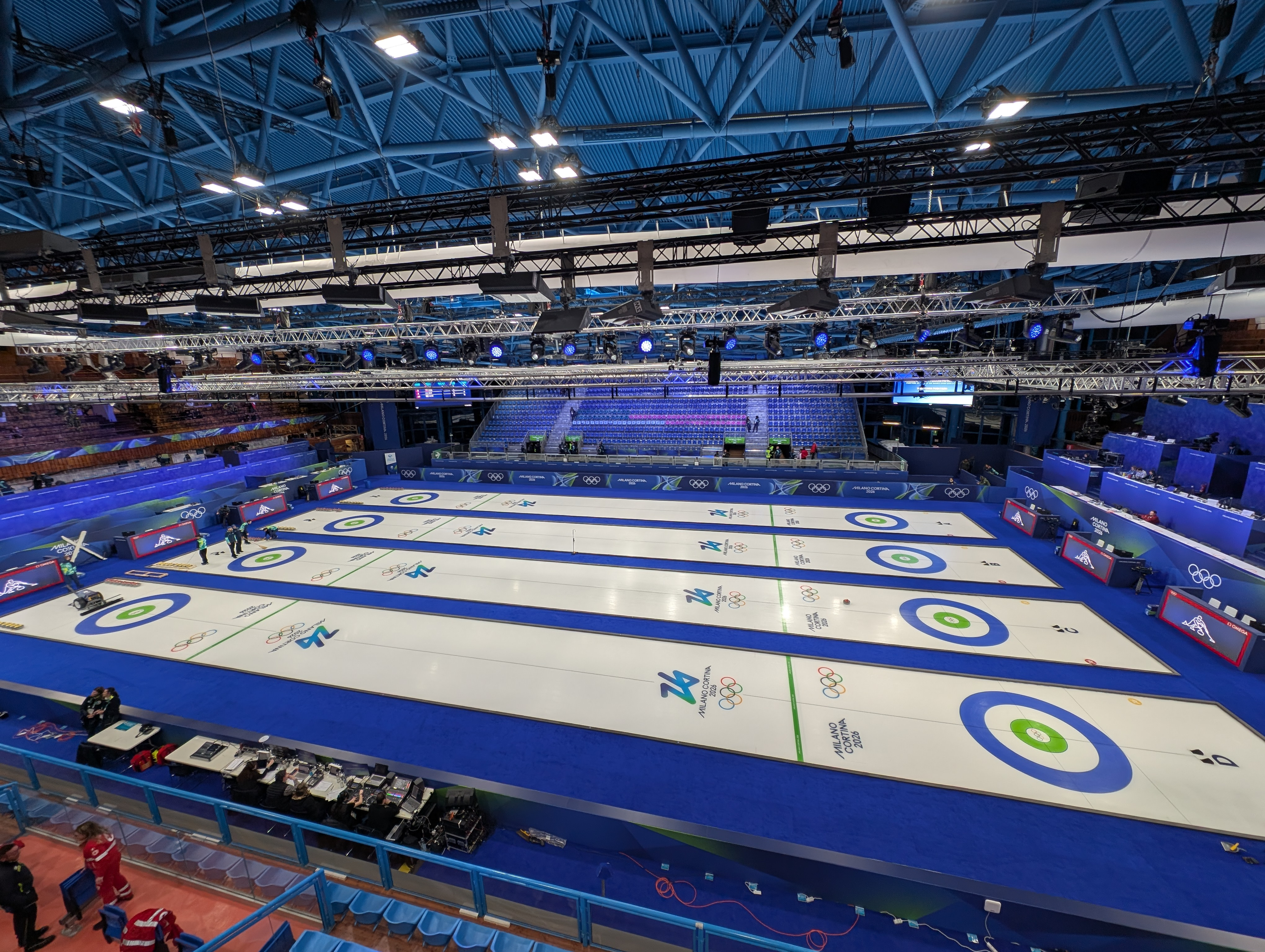
The stadium hosting curling during the 2026 Winter Olympics
