= Mikhail Demidov =

Russian chess grandmaster (born 1992)

Personal information
- Native name: Михаил Геннадьевич Демидов
- Born: June 17, 1992 (age 34) Odintsovo, Russia

Chess career
- Country: Russia
- Title: Grandmaster (2019)
- FIDE rating: 2512 (November 2026)
- Peak rating: 2587 (June 2023)

Mikhail Gennadyevich Demidov (Russian: Михаил Геннадьевич Демидов) is a Russian chess Grandmaster and senior coach of the Russian youth national team.

== Early life ==
Demidov learned to play chess from his father at the age of four. He initially trained in Odintsovo under Mikhail Bench, and later moved to Khimki, where he joined the Petrosian Chess Club at the "Youth of Moscow" sports school. There, he was coached by Lyudmila Belavenets, Natalia Chukhrova, Lyudmila Zaitseva, and International Master Igor Yanvarev, before joining the chess school of Evgeny Bareev.

== Career ==
In 2014, Demidov finished fifth at both the Moscow Chess Championship and the blitz event of the Chigorin Memorial. In 2016, he tied for 1st–3rd place in Group B of the Aeroflot Open alongside Ilya Iljiushenok and Ivan Rozum.

Demidov achieved his Grandmaster norms at tournaments in Slovakia, Lithuania, and the Czech Republic. He was awarded the GM title by FIDE in 2019. He won both the Lev Polugaevsky Memorial and the Igor Kurnosov Memorial, and competed in the national team championships of the Czech Republic, Germany, the Netherlands, France, and Catalonia.

At the European Rapid and Blitz Championships, Demidov finished 11th in the rapid event in 2018 and placed in the top 10 of the blitz tournament in 2019.

In 2024, he was appointed senior coach of the Russian youth national team.

== Personal life ==
Demidov is married to International Master and Woman Grandmaster Irina Vasilevich, and they have two children.
