= 2022–23 Latvian Hockey League season =

Latvian Hockey League season

2022–23 Latvian Hockey League
- League: Latvian Hockey Higher League
- Sport: Ice hockey
- Duration: 3 September 2022 – 5 April 2023
- Number of teams: 9
- TV partner(s): TV4, Sportacentrs.com, LTV7, Sport1, TV6 (final games only)

Regular season
- Winners: Mogo/LSPA

Playoffs

Finals
- Champions: Zemgale/LLU
- Runners-up: Mogo/LSPA
- Finals MVP: Gatis Gricinskis (Zemgale/LLU)

Latvian Hockey League seasons
- ← 2021–22 2023–24 →

The 2022–23 Latvian Hockey League season was the 32nd season of the Latvian Hockey League, the top level of ice hockey in Latvia. The season was played from September 2022 to April 2023. This season expanded its participants to nine teams – six from Latvia and three from Lithuania. Zemgale/LLU were the defending champions and won the title for the second season in a row when they defeated Mogo/LSPA in five games. Gatis Gricinskis of Zemgale/LLU was named the most valuable player (MVP) of the finals series.

== Teams ==
Team	City
7bet-Hockey Punks	(Lithuania) Vilnius
Airwell Energija	Elektrėnai
Dinamo Riga	(Latvia) Riga
DLSS/Dinaburga	Daugavpils
HS Rīga	Riga
Kaunas City	Kaunas
Mogo/LSPA	Riga
Prizma	Riga
Zemgale/LLU	Jelgava

== Regular season ==
Pos	Team	Pld	W	OTW	OTL	L	GF	GA	GD	Pts	Final result
1	Mogo/LSPA	32	27	3	0	2	227	54	+173	60	Advance to Playoffs
2	Zemgale/LLU	32	23	1	3	5	149	53	+96	51	Advance to Playoffs
3	Dinamo Riga	32	16	5	1	10	147	105	+42	43	Advance to Playoffs
4	Prizma	32	17	1	2	12	142	118	+24	38	Advance to Playoffs
5	HS Rīga	32	10	3	7	12	117	96	+21	33	Advance to Playoffs
6	Kaunas City	32	13	0	1	18	133	153	−20	27	Advance to Playoffs
7	Airwell Energija	32	8	4	2	18	101	134	−33	26	Advance to Playoffs
8	7bet-Hockey Punks	32	10	1	2	19	100	166	−66	24	Advance to Playoffs
9	DLSS/Dinaburga	32	2	0	0	30	69	306	−237	4	

Source: LHF.lv

== Playoffs ==
Quarterfinals
1	Mogo/LSPA	3
8	7bet-Hockey Punks	0
4	Prizma	3
5	HS Rīga	0
3	Dinamo Riga	3
6	Kaunas City	2
2	Zemgale/LLU	3
7	Airwell Energija	0

Semifinals
1	Mogo/LSPA	4
4	Prizma	0
3	Dinamo Riga	0
2	Zemgale/LLU	4

Finals
1	Mogo/LSPA	1
2	Zemgale/LLU	4
