= Vladimir Malevich =

Russian ice hockey player

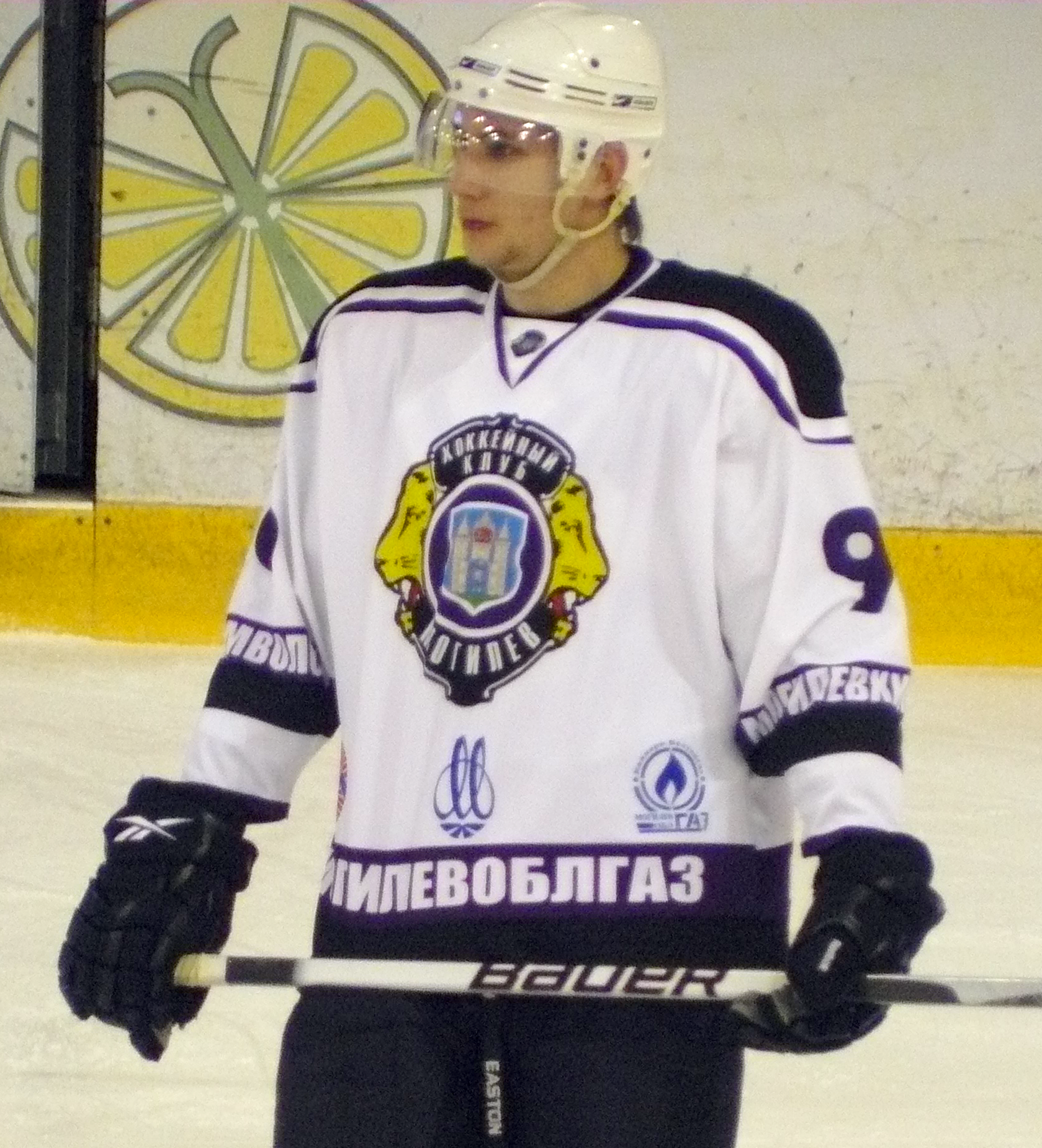
- Born: July 2, 1985 (age 39); Zeya, Russia
- Height: 6 ft 5 in (196 cm)
- Weight: 218 lb (99 kg; 15 st 8 lb)
- Position: Defence
- Shoots: Left
- UHL team Former teams: HC Donbass; HC Neftekhimik Nizhnekamsk; HK Mogilev; Metallurg Zhlobin; HC Vityaz; Atlant Moscow Oblast; Torpedo Nizhny Novgorod; HC Sochi; HC Yugra; Amur Khabarovsk; Arlan Kokshetau; Severstal Cherepovets
- Playing career: 2003–present

Vladimir Malevich (born July 2, 1985) is a Russian professional ice hockey defenceman currently playing for HC Donbass in the Ukrainian Hockey League.

Malevich played with HC Vityaz Podolsk of the KHL during the 2012–13 season.
