= Arlan Kokshetau =

- City: Kokshetau, Kazakhstan
- League: Pro Hokei Ligasy
- Founded: 2009
- Home arena: Burabay Arena
- Colours
- Website: arlan-hc.kz

Arlan Hockey Club (Kazakh: Арлан хоккей клубы Arlan Kókshetaý hokkeı klýby, Russian: Хоккейный клуб Арлан) commonly referred as Arlan Kokshetau, is a professional ice hockey team based in Kokshetau, Kazakhstan. Founded in 2009, they play in the Kazakhstan Hockey Championship, the top level of ice hockey in Kazakhstan. The team also won the 2018–19 IIHF Continental Cup, becoming the first team from Kazakhstan to do so.

== Season-by-season record ==
Note: GP = Games played, W = Wins, L = Losses, T = Ties, OTW = Overtime/shootout wins, OTL = Overtime/shootout losses, Pts = Points, GF = Goals for, GA = Goals against

Season	GP	W	L	OTW	OTL	Pts	GF	GA	Finish	Playoffs
2009–10	56	27	22	5	2	93	172	159	5th	Did not qualify
2010–11	54	22	24	4	4	78	169	161	6th	Lost in Quarterfinals, 3–1 (Yertis Pavlodar)
2011–12	54	21	24	4	5	76	149	149	6th	Lost in Quarterfinals, 3–0 (Yertis Pavlodar)
2012–13	54	37	9	6	2	125	231	116	1st	Lost in Semifinals, 4–1 (Beibarys Atyrau)
2013-14	54	35	10	7	2	121	237	118	2nd	Lost in Finals, 4-1 (Yertis Pavlodar)
2014-15	54	34	11	4	5	115	246	142	1st	Lost in Finals, 2-3 (Yertis Pavlodar)
2015-16	54	42	8	2	2	132	204	95	1st	Lost in Finals, 3-4 (Beibarys Atyrau)
2016-17	54	38	10	4	2	124	182	103	1st	Lost in Semifinals, 3-4 (HC Temirtau)
2017-18	54	29	13	5	7	104	162	102	2nd	Kazakhstan Hockey Cup Champions, 4-2 (Nomad Astana)
2018-19	54	33	12	5	4	113	171	102	2nd	Lost in Semifinals, 4-2 (Nomad Astana)
2019-20	60	43	17	4	6	131	221	118	1st	Season delayed to February 2021
2020-21	48	28	20	5	3	82	144	116	6th	Lost in Finals, 4-2 (Saryarka Karagandy)
2021-22	48	31	5	8	4	82	187	95	2nd	Lost in Finals, 4-3 (Saryarka Karagandy)
2022-23	48	28	13	0	4	58	169	95	5th	Lost in Quarterfinals, 4-3 (Nomad Astana)
2023-24	50	35	6	5	4	84	194	77	1st	Kazakhstan Hockey Cup Champions, 4-1 (Nomad Astana)
2024-25	40	28	6	3	3	65	146	78	1st	Kazakhstan Hockey Cup Champions, 4-0 (Torpedo Ust-Kamenogorsk)

== Achievements ==
IIHF Continental Cup:

- Winners (1): 2018/2019

Kazakhstan Hockey Championship:

- Winners (1): 2017–18
- Runners-up (2): 2013–14, 2014–15
- 3rd place (1): 2012–13

Kazakhstan Hockey Cup:

- Winners (2): 2012, 2013, 2024, 2025

== Players ==
Arlan Kokshetau roster
No.	Nat	Player	Pos	S/G	Age	Acquired	Birthplace
89	(Kazakhstan)	Galiaskar Aipov	F	L	21		Kokshetau, Kazakhstan
91	(Russia)	Dmitri Arkhipov	LW	L	33	2024	Novocheboksarsk, Russia
39	(Kazakhstan)	Tamerlan Beisembiyev	F	L	23		
97	(Kazakhstan)	Leonid Belyayev	F	L	25		
68	(Russia)	Vladimir Borovkov	F	L	32	2023	Nizhny Tagil, Russia
71	(Kazakhstan)	Denis Chaporov	C	L	25	2023	Karaganda, Kazakhstan
15	(Kazakhstan)	Maxim Karpov	F	L	25	2024	
80	(Kazakhstan)	Igor Kisel	F	L	23		
10	(Russia)	Andrei Kurakov	F	R	23	2024	
8	(Russia)	Vladislav Nikulin	F	L	31	2023	Moskva, Russia
41	(Russia)	Danil Paramonov	RW	L	23	2024	Novosibirsk, Russia
27	(Kazakhstan)	Danila Pinidi	F	L	21		Atyrau, Kazakhstan
95	(Kazakhstan)	Dmitri Presnov	C	L	29		Karaganda, Kazakhstan
26	(Russia)	Stepan Sannikov	LW	L	35	2024	Solikamsk, Russia
99	(Russia)	Nikita Svintsitsky	C	L	32	2025	Togliatti, Russia
88	(Kazakhstan)	Alexander Svoyevolin	F	L	24	2025 (Loan)	
96	(Russia)	Valentin Tarasenko	F	L	25		Togliatti, Russia
18	(Kazakhstan)	Vladimir Volkov	RW	L	29	2023	Karaganda, Kazakhstan
17	(Russia)	Kirill Basov	D	R	24	2023	Yaroslavl, Russia
44	(Kazakhstan)	Danil Bazko	D	L	22		Kokshetau, Kazakhstan
81	(Belarus)	Arseni Borisov	D	L	29	2024	Vitebsk, Belarus
11	(Russia)	Buivan Semyon	D	L	23		Uvelsky, Russia
82	(Russia)	Alexander Gopiyenko	D	L	26		Khabarovsk, Russia
7	(Kazakhstan)	Ruslan Ibrayev	D	L	22	2022	
55	(Russia)	Fyodor Khoroshev	D	R	31	2022	Perm, Russia
33	(Kazakhstan)	Eduard Mikhailov	D	L	29	2021	Karaganda, Kazakhstan
9	(Russia)	Oleg Zheleznov	D	L	33		Kazan, Russia
20	(Kazakhstan)	Darmen Gabdullin	G	L	22	2024	
32	(Kazakhstan)	Sergei Kudryavtsev	G	L	31		Ust-Kamenogorsk, Kazakhstan
30	(Kazakhstan)	Timur Meider	G	L	24		

== Head coaches ==
- Dmitri Glavyuk 2009-10
- Leonid Shilyayev 2010-11
- Dmitri Bondarev 2011–12
- Leonīds Beresņevs 2012–13
- Vladimír Klinga 2013–2015
- Viktor Bogatyryov 2015-17
- Vladimir Kapulovsky 2017-19/2020-21
- Dusan Gregor 2019-20
- Sergei Berdnikov 2020-22
- Dmitri Katayev 2022-24
- Vladimir Markelov 2024-present
