= Arystan Temirtau =

- City: Temirtau, Kazakhstan
- League: Kazakhstan Hockey Championship
- Founded: 2010
- Operated: 2015
- Home arena: Temirtau Ice Palace
- Colors: Red, White, Orange

Arystan Hockey Club (Kazakh: «Арыстан» хоккей клубы, Arystan hokkeı klýby), commonly referred to as Arystan Temirtau, was a professional ice hockey team based in Temirtau, Kazakhstan. They were founded in 2010, and played in the Kazakhstan Hockey Championship until they declared bankruptcy in 2015.

== Season-by-season record ==
Note: GP = Games played, W = Wins, L = Losses, T = Ties, OTW = Overtime/shootout wins, OTL = Overtime/shootout losses, Pts = Points, GF = Goals for, GA = Goals against

Season	GP	W	L	OTW	OTL	Pts	GF	GA	Finish	Playoffs
2010–11	54	20	23	8	3	79	170	143	5th	Lost in quarterfinals, 1–3 (Nomad Astana)
2011–12	54	31	14	5	4	107	213	141	4th	Lost in semifinals, 0–4 (Beibarys Atyrau)
2012–13	54	24	17	10	3	95	194	141	3rd	Lost in semifinals, 1–4 (Yertis Pavlodar)

== Achievements ==
Kazakhstan Hockey Cup:

- Winners (1): 2011
