= Beibarys Atyrau =

- City: Atyrau, Kazakhstan
- League: Pro Hokei Ligasy
- Founded: 2009
- Home arena: Khiuaz Dospanova Ice Palace
- Colours: Green, White, Black
- Head coach: Alexander Istomin
- Website: beibarys.kz

Championships
- Playoff championships: 2010–11, 2011–12, 2015–16

Beibarys Hockey Club (Kazakh: Бейбарыс хоккей клубы; Russian: Хоккейный клуб Бейбарыс), commonly referred as Beibarys Atyrau, are a professional ice hockey team based in Atyrau, Kazakhstan. They were founded in 2009, and play in the Pro Hokei Ligasy, the top level of ice hockey in Kazakhstan.

== Season-by-season record ==
For the full season-by-season history, see List of Beibarys Atyrau seasons.

Note: GP = Games played, W = Wins, L = Losses, OTW = Overtime/shootout wins, OTL = Overtime/shootout losses, Pts = Points, GF = Goals for, GA = Goals against

Season	GP	W	L	OTW	OTL	Pts	GF	GA	Finish	Playoffs
2009–10	56	32	12	4	8	112	203	105	3rd	Lost in Finals, 2–3 (Saryarka Karagandy)
2010–11	54	37	11	2	4	119	177	99	2nd	Kazakhstan Champions, 4–0 (Barys Astana-2)
2011–12	54	40	9	3	2	128	220	71	1st	Kazakhstan Champions, 4–2 (Yertis Pavlodar)
2012–13	54	26	16	4	8	94	150	97	4th	Lost in Finals, 1–4 (Yertis Pavlodar)

== Achievements ==
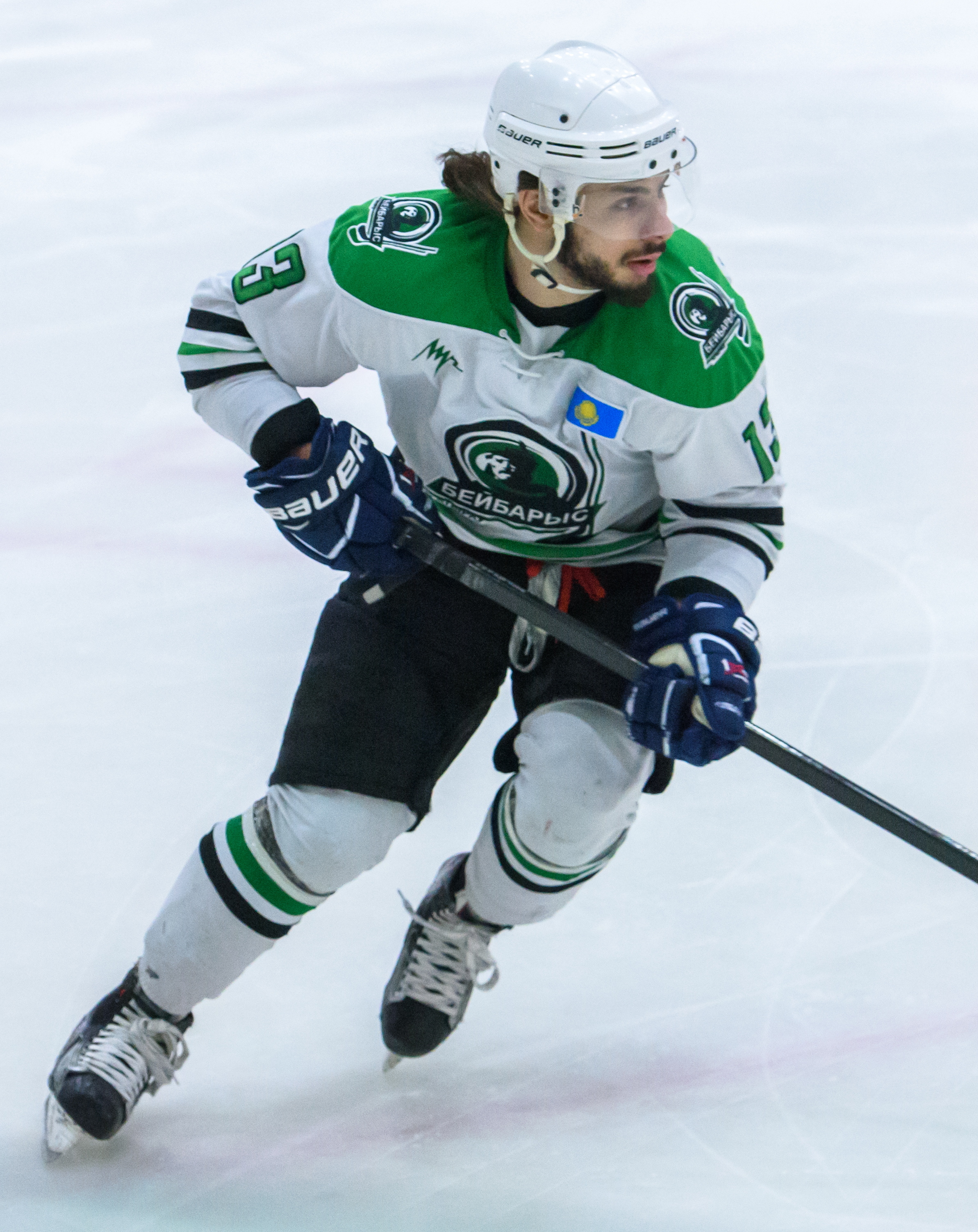
Eliezer Sherbatov with Beibarys Atyrau

Kazakhstan Hockey Championship:

- Winners (4): 2010–11, 2011–12, 2015–16, 2018–19
- Runners-up (2): 2009–10, 2012–13

Kazakhstan Hockey Cup:

- Runners-up (1): 2012

IIHF Continental Cup

- Runners-up (1): 2016–17

== Notable players ==
- Mike Danton (born 1980), Canadian ice hockey player
- Māris Jučers (born 1987), Latvian ice hockey player
- Eliezer Sherbatov (born 1991), Canadian-Israeli ice hockey player

== Head coaches ==
- Alexander Istomin 2009–present
