= Yertis Pavlodar =

- City: Pavlodar, Kazakhstan
- League: Pro Hokei Ligasy
- Founded: 2009
- Home arena: Astana Ice Palace
- Colours
- Website: ertis-hc.kz

Championships
- Playoff championships: 2012-13, 2013–14, 2014–15

Hockey Club Yertis (Kazakh: «Ертіс» хоккей клубы; Ertis Hokei Kluby, Russian: Хоккейный клуб «Ертис»), commonly referred to as Irtysh Pavlodar, is a professional ice hockey team based in Pavlodar, Kazakhstan. They were founded in 2009, and play in the Pro Hokei Ligasy, top level of ice hockey in Kazakhstan.

== Season-by-season record ==
Note: GP = Games played, W = Wins, L = Losses, OTW = Overtime/shootout wins, OTL = Overtime/shootout losses, Pts = Points, GF = Goals for, GA = Goals against

Season	GP	W	L	OTW	OTL	Pts	GF	GA	Finish	Playoffs
2009–10	56	33	10	3	10	115	192	122	2nd	Lost in Semifinals, 2–3 (Beibarys Atyrau)
2010–11	54	28	16	7	3	101	180	131	3rd	Lost in Semifinals, 2–4 (Beibarys Atyrau)
2011–12	54	33	14	5	2	115	111	81	3rd	Lost in Finals, 2–4 (Beibarys Atyrau)
2012–13	54	34	11	5	4	116	177	104	2nd	Kazakhstan Champions, 4–1 (Beibarys Atyrau)
2013–14	54	39	6	5	4	131	214	99	1st	Kazakhstan Champions, 4–0 (Arlan Kokshetau)
2014–15	54	31	14	4	5	106	223	152	3rd	Kazakhstan Champions, 4–1 (Gornyak Rudny)

== Current roster ==
Updated 22 November 2013.

No.	Nat	Player	Pos	S/G	Age	Acquired	Birthplace
14	(Russia)	Artem Sokolov	D	L	44	2012	Yaroslavl, Russian SFSR
27	(Kazakhstan)	Leonid Metalnikov	D	L	36	2013	Ust-Kamenogorsk, Kazakh SSR
46	(Kazakhstan)	Alexander Lipin	D	L	40	2010	Ust-Kamenogorsk, Kazakh SSR
53	(Kazakhstan)	Sergei Miroshnichenko	D	L	47	2010	Ust-Kamenogorsk, Kazakh SSR
11	(Russia)	Stanislav Basov	F	L	45	2011	Khabarovsk, Russian SFSR
17	(Russia)	Denis Klemeshov	F	L	42	2009	Novosibirsk, Russian SFSR
82	(Russia)	Maxim Sharifyanov	F	L	43	2013	Ufa, Russian SFSR

== Notable players ==
- Andrej Nedorost (born 1980), Slovak ice hockey player
- Marek Pinc (born 1979), Czech ice hockey player
- Eliezer Sherbatov (born 1991), Canadian-Israeli ice hockey player

== Head coaches ==
- Oleg Bolyakin 2007–08
- Yerlan Sagymbayev 2009–11
- Julius Penzes 2011–present

== Achievements ==
Kazakhstan Hockey Championship:

- Winners (3): 2012-13, 2013–14, 2014–15
- Runners-up (1): 2011–12
- 3rd place (1): 2009–10

Kazakhstan Hockey Cup:

- Winners (1): 2014
- Runners-up (1): 2013
- 3rd place (1): 2012
