= Nomad Astana =

Kazakh ice hockey team

- City: Astana, Kazakhstan
- League: Kazakhstan Hockey Championship
- Conference: 2
- Division: D
- Founded: 2007
- Home arena: Kazakhstan Sports Palace
- Colours
- Owners: Kazakhstan Temir Zholy (Askar Mamin, chairman)
- Head coach: Alexander Vysotsky
- Affiliates: Barys Astana (KHL); Snezhnye Barsy (MHL)

Nomad Hockey Club (Kazakh: Номад хоккей клубы; Nomad Hokei Kluby; Russian: Хоккейный клуб Номад), commonly referred to as Nomad Astana, is a farm team of the Barys Astana of the Kontinental Hockey League (KHL). Founded in 2007 as Barys Astana–2, the team changed its name to Nomad Astana in 2013. Formerly a member of the Supreme Hockey League, Nomad currently play in the Kazakhstan Hockey Championship.

== History ==
The team formed in 2007 to play in the Pervaya Liga. They finished in 14th place in the Ural–Western Siberia Zone. Next season, they joined the Kazakhstan Hockey Championship. Squaded by junior players, they finished in last place in their first season of play. Next season, they qualified for the playoffs for the first time. Strengthened by players from the Barys Astana, they reached finals. However they lost to Beibarys Atyrau in four games in series.

On 31 May 2019 it was announced that Nomand would be leaving the Kazakh league, and would be joining the VHL for the 2019-20 season. Alongside Nomand, Dynamo Tver, Torpedo-Gorky Nizhny Novgorod and Uzbekistans's Humo Tashkent would also be joining the league.

On January 13 Nomad won their first ever IIHF continental cup in the Vindico Arena in Cardiff, Wales after defeating the hosts the Cardiff Devils 5-2 and Herning Blue Fox 7-2.

== Season-by-season record ==
Note: GP = Games played, W = Wins, L = Losses, OTW = Overtime/shootout wins, OTL = Overtime/shootout losses, Pts = Points, GF = Goals for, GA = Goals against

Season	GP	W	L	OTW	OTL	Pts	GF	GA	Finish	Playoffs
2009–10	56	4	46	5	1	23	92	329	8th	Did not qualify
2010–11	54	24	20	5	5	87	177	191	4th	Lost in Finals, 0–4 (Beibarys Atyrau)
2011–12	54	6	46	0	2	20	98	297	9th	Did not qualify
2012–13	54	21	25	4	4	75	151	164	7th	Lost in Quarterfinals, 1–4 (Yertis Pavlodar)
2013–14	54	22	23	5	4	80	159	158	5th	Lost in Quarterfinals, 2–4 (Arystan Temirtau)
2014–15	54	18	25	3	8	68	151	160	7th	Lost in Quarterfinals, 3–4 (Gornyak Rudny)

== Achievements ==
Kazakhstan Hockey Championship:

- Winners (1): 2016–17
- Runners-up (1): 2010–11

IIHF Continental Cup:

- Winners (1): 2023-24
- Runners-up (1): 2017–18

== Head coaches ==
- Yuri Mikhailis 2009–10
- Galym Mambetaliyev 2010–11
- Yuri Mikhailis 2011–12
- Alexander Vysotsky 2013–14
- Yuri Mikhailis 2014–20
- Alexander Vysotsky 2020–
