= 2015–16 Kazakhstan Hockey Championship =

- League: Kazakhstan Hockey Championship
- Sport: Ice Hockey
- Duration: 5 September 2015–20 April 2016
- Games: 303
- Teams: 10

Regular season
- Season champions: Arlan Kokshetau
- Top scorer: (Kazakhstan) Igor Cherkasov (Gornyak Rudny) (53 points)

(Slovakia) Peter Fabuš (Yertis Pavlodar) (12 points)

Finals
- Champions: Beibarys Atyrau
- Runners-up: Arlan Kokshetau

Kazakhstan Hockey Championship seasons
- ← 2014–15 2016–17 →

The 2015–16 Kazakhstan Hockey Championship was the 24th season since the founding of the Kazakhstan Hockey Championship.

== Teams ==
Teams of the 2015-16 KHC season

Team	City	Arena
Arlan Kokshetau	Kokshetau	Burabay Arena
Beibarys Atyrau	Atyrau	Khiuaz Dospanova Ice Palace
Gornyak Rudny	Rudny	Rudny Ice Palace
HC Almaty	Almaty	Baluan Sholak Sports Palace
HC Astana	Astana	Kazakhstan Sports Palace
HC Temirtau	Temirtau	Temirtau Muz Aydyny
Kulager Petropavl	Petropavl	Alexander Vinokourov Sports Palace
Nomad Astana	Astana	Kazakhstan Sports Palace
ShKO Oskemen	Ust-Kamenogorsk	Boris Alexandrov Sports Palace
Yertis Pavlodar	Pavlodar	Astana Ice Palace

== Regular season ==
=== Standings ===
Team	Pld	W	OTW	OTL	L	GF	GA	GD	Pts	Qualification
Arlan Kokshetau	54	42	2	2	8	204	95	+109	132	Direct playoff qualification
Beibarys Atyrau	54	31	5	4	14	198	114	+84	107	Direct playoff qualification
Kulager Petropavl	54	26	6	7	15	176	141	+35	97	Direct playoff qualification
Nomad Astana	54	27	6	2	19	177	125	+52	95	Direct playoff qualification
Yertis Pavlodar	54	25	5	4	20	157	124	+33	89	Direct playoff qualification
HC Temirtau	54	25	4	5	20	150	121	+29	88	Direct playoff qualification
Gornyak Rudny	54	21	2	7	24	166	168	−2	74	Direct playoff qualification
HC Almaty	54	19	6	4	25	130	164	−34	73	Direct playoff qualification
ShKO Oskemen	54	12	3	6	33	120	167	−47	48	
HC Astana	54	1	2	0	51	67	326	−259	7	

Source: Kazakhstan Vyschaya Liga

== Play-off ==
=== Quarterfinals ===
==== Arlan Kokshetau vs. HC Astana ====
2 March	Arlan Kokshetau	3–2	HC Almaty	Burabay Arena, Kokshetau
Elvijs Biezais – 9:44		First period	13:30 – Maxim Bogatyrenko
Elvijs Biezais – 25:44		Second period	39:01 – Danil Abramochkin
Martin Kriška – 46:21		Third period	No scoring
Andrei Yankov		Goalie stats	Filipp Sirik

3 March	Arlan Kokshetau	5–0	HC Almaty	Burabay Arena, Kokshetau
Martin Kriška – 2:18; Anton Petrov – 9:28; Martin Kriška – 11:49		First period	No scoring
Konstantin Savenkov – 29:08		Second period	No scoring
Alexander Nurek – 55:25		Third period	No scoring
Dmitri Voloshin		Goalie stats	Filipp Sirik

6 March	HC Almaty	0–4	Arlan Kokshetau	Baluan Sholak Palace of Culture and Sports, Almaty
No scoring		First period	13:05 – Teemu Virtala; 15:50 – Ivan Kuchin
No scoring		Second period	20:42 – Konstantin Teslyukevich; 29:24 – Kirill Sidorenko
No scoring		Third period	No scoring
Filipp Sirik		Goalie stats	Andrei Yankov

Arlan Kokshetau won series 3–0

==== Beibarys Atyrau vs. Gornyak Rudny ====
2 March	Beibarys Atyrau	3–1	Gornyak Rudny	Khiuaz Dospanova Ice Palace, Atyrau
No scoring		First period	06:06 – Aleksei Krasavin
Konstantin Baranov – 29:41		Second period	No scoring
Maxim Krivonozhkin – 52:00; Ilya Malyushkin – 59:48		Third period	No scoring
Aleksei Kuznetsov		Goalie stats	Anton Todykov

3 March	Beibarys Atyrau	3–0	Gornyak Rudny	Khiuaz Dospanova Ice Palace, Atyrau
Alexander Zubkov – 03:16		First period	No scoring
No scoring		Second period	No scoring
Eliezer Sherbatov – 51:26; Eliezer Sherbatov – 59:51		Third period	No scoring
Aleksei Kuznetsov		Goalie stats	Anton Todykov

6 March	Gornyak Rudny	1–2	Beibarys Atyrau	Rudny Ice Palace, Rudny
No scoring		First period	Ilya Malyushkin – 09:32; Eliezer Sherbatov – 10:00
No scoring		Second period	No scoring
49:03 – Alexander Kurshuk		Third period	No scoring
Anton Todykov		Goalie stats	Aleksei Kuznetsov

Beibarys Atyrau won series 3–0

==== Kulager Petropavl vs. HC Temirtau ====
2 March	Kulager Petropavl	1–0	HC Temirtau	Alexander Vinokourov Sport Palace, Petropavl
Vladislav Nikulin – 11:58		First period	No scoring
No scoring		Second period	No scoring
No scoring		Third period	No scoring
John Murray		Goalie stats	Vladimir Kovac

3 March	Kulager Petropavl	2–0	HC Temirtau	Alexander Vinokourov Sport Palace, Petropavl
No scoring		First period	No scoring
Alexander Egorov – 27:48		Second period	No scoring
Lukas Martinka – 59:07		Third period	No scoring
John Murray		Goalie stats	Vladimir Kovac

6 March	HC Temirtau	1–4	Kulager Petropavl	Temirtau Muz Aydyny, Temirtau
No scoring		First period	No scoring
Ivan Rybchik – 28:53		Second period	No scoring
No scoring		Third period	41:33 – Anton Dubinin; 45:55 – Kirill Elagin; 47:10 – Maxim Volkov; 57:55 – Ilgiz Nuriev
Vladimir Kovac		Goalie stats	John Murray

Kulager Petropavl won series 3–0

==== Nomad Astana vs. Yertis Pavlodar ====
2 March	Nomad Astana	5–4	Yertis Pavlodar	Kazakhstan Sport Palace, Astana
Alexander Vorobyov – 01:46; Leonid Metalnikov – 07:42; Alexander Vorobyov – 09:24		First period	No scoring
Ilya Solarev – 27:30		Second period	26:34 – Mikhail Rakhmanov; 37:15 – Peter Fabus
Artyom Sevostyanov – 41:11		Third period	40:22 – Mikhail Rakhmanov; 45:12 – Artyom Ignatenko
Pavel Poluektov		Goalie stats	Mikhail Smolnikov

3 March	Nomad Astana	1–2 (OT)	Yertis Pavlodar	Kazakhstan Sport Palace, Astana
No scoring		First period	No scoring
Artyom Sevostyanov – 38:40		Second period	No scoring
No scoring		Third period	49:20 – Peter Fabus
No scoring		Overtime	65:00 – Stanislav Loginov
Dmitri Malgin		Goalie stats	Marek Simko

6 March	Yertis Pavlodar	6–4	Nomad Astana	Astana Ice Palace, Pavlodar
Michal Grman – 10:34; Stanislav Loginov – 11:38		First period	17:51 – Maxim Khudyakov
Stanislav Loginov – 23:37; Michal Grman – 27:17; Vadim Ermolaev – 30:37; Albert Gatin – 31:02		Second period	20:41 – Artyom Sevostyanov; 28:10 – Mikhail Panshin; 35:36 – Nursultan Belgibayev
No scoring		Third period	No scoring
Marek Simko		Goalie stats	Dmitri Malgin

7 March	Yertis Pavlodar	4–5	Nomad Astana	Astana Ice Palace, Pavlodar
Michal Grman – 17:35		First period	06:22 – Daniyar Kairov; 19:41 – Alexey Litvinenko
Mikhail Rakhmanov – 29:41		Second period	No scoring
Michal Grman – 42:54; Andrei Petushkin – 58:39		Third period	43:35 – Andrei Yakovlev; 45:03 – Anton Nekryach; 56:11 – Nursultan Belgibayev
Marek Simko		Goalie stats	Pavel Poluektov

10 March	Nomad Astana	1–3	Yertis Pavlodar	Kazakhstan Sport Palace, Astana
No scoring		First period	No scoring
No scoring		Second period	22:44 – Artyom Ignatenko; 33:23 – Artyom Burdelyov
Anton Nekryach – 40:45		Third period	46:55 – Mikhail Rakhmanov
Pavel Poluektov		Goalie stats	Mikhail Smolnikov

Yertis Pavlodar won series 3–2

=== Semi-finals ===
==== Arlan Kokshetau vs. Yertis Pavlodar ====
15 March	Arlan Kokshetau	1–4	Yertis Pavlodar	Burabay Arena, Kokshetau
No scoring		First period	01:37 – Mikhail Rakhmanov; 04:55 – Vadim Ermolaev; 18:49 – Vadim Ermolaev
Anton Petrov - 33:52		Second period	36:28 – Vadim Ermolaev
No scoring		Third period	No scoring
Andrei Yankov		Goalie stats	Mikhail Smolnikov

16 March	Arlan Kokshetau	2–1	Yertis Pavlodar	Burabay Arena, Kokshetau
No scoring		First period	No scoring
Yesmukhan Tolepbergen - 24:51		Second period	29:22 – Vadim Ermolaev
Marko Virtala - 52:07		Third period	No scoring
Andrei Yankov		Goalie stats	Mikhail Smolnikov

19 March	Yertis Pavlodar	2–3	Arlan Kokshetau	Astana Ice Palace, Pavlodar
Rustem Aydash - 11:52		First period	07:40 - Elvijs Biezais
Vadim Ermolaev - 38:54		Second period	34:48 - Ivan Kuchin
No scoring		Third period	59:50 - Rastislav Gaspar
Mikhail Smolnikov		Goalie stats	Dmitri Voloshin

20 March	Yertis Pavlodar	3–2 (OT)	Arlan Kokshetau	Astana Ice Palace, Pavlodar
Artyom Burdelyov		First period	Ivan Kuchin
Vadim Ermolaev		Second period	Alexey Ivanov
No scoring		Third period	No scoring
Peter Fabus		Overtime	No scoring
Mikhail Smolnikov		Goalie stats	Dmitri Voloshin

23 March	Arlan Kokshetau	3–4 (OT)	Yertis Pavlodar	Burabay Arena, Kokshetau
Alexey Ivanov - 04:59; Elvijs Biezais - 15:47		First period	No scoring
Elvijs Biezais - 34:18		Second period	23:25 – Alexander Gutov; 37:21 - Artyom Burdelyov
No scoring		Third period	51:17 – Artyom Sevostyanov
No scoring		overtime period	60:54 – Georgi Dulnev
Mikhail Smolnikov		Goalie stats	Andrei Yankov

26 March	Yertis Pavlodar	2–4	Arlan Kokshetau	Astana Ice Palace, Pavlodar
No scoring		First period	11:35 – Martin Kriska
Vadim Ermolaev - 24:19; Andrei Petushkin - 36:57		Second period	32:10 – Anton Petrov
No scoring		Third period	50:11 – Martin Kriska; 59:13 – Dusan Devecka
Mikhail Smolnikov		Goalie stats	Dmitri Voloshin

29 March	Arlan Kokshetau	2–1 (OT)	Yertis Pavlodar	Burabay Arena, Kokshetau
Vladimir Markelov - 06:19		First period	No scoring
No scoring		Second period	30:41 – Peter Fabus
No scoring		Third period	No scoring
Teemu Virtala - 80:00		overtime period	No scoring
Dmitri Voloshin		Goalie stats	Mikhail Smolnikov

Arlan Kokshetau won series 4–3

==== Beibarys Atyrau vs. Kulager Petropavl ====
15 March	Beibarys Atyrau	2–1 (OT)	Kulager Petropavl	Khiuaz Dospanova Ice Palace, Atyrau
No scoring		First period	04:26 – Artyom Senkevich
Maxim Krivonozhkin - 27:17		Second period	No scoring
No scoring		Third period	No scoring
Andrei Spiridonov - 75:58		Overtime	No scoring
Alexey Kuznetsov		Goalie stats	Maxim Gryaznov

16 March	Beibarys Atyrau	5–4 (OT)	Kulager Petropavl	Khiuaz Dospanova Ice Palace, Atyrau
No scoring		First period	01:41 - Anton Dubinin; 15:20 - Anton Dubinin
Tomas Vak - 24:25; Denis Makarov - 37:15		Second period	34:00 – Maxim Volkov; 34:15 - Anton Dubinin
Eliezer Sherbatov - 53:21; Konstantin Baranov - 59:54		Third period	No scoring
Andrei Spiridonov - 71:32		Overtime	No scoring
Alexey Kuznetsov		Goalie stats	Maxim Gryaznov

19 March	Kulager Petropavl	0–1	Beibarys Atyrau	Alexander Vinokourov Sport Palace, Petropavl
No scoring		First period	16:03 – Aleksandr Khramkov
No scoring		Second period	No scoring
No scoring		Third period	No scoring
John Murray		Goalie stats	Alexey Kuznetsov

20 March	Kulager Petropavl	4–3 (OT)	Beibarys Atyrau	Alexander Vinokourov Sport Palace, Petropavl
Igor Valeev - 00:31; Ilgiz Nuriev - 18:36		First period	08:45 – Sergei Salnikov
No scoring		Second period	No scoring
Ilgiz Nuriev - 57:48		Third period	48:25 - Eliezer Sherbatov; 49:56 - Ilya Malyushkin
Maxim Gorechishnikov - 64:25		Overtime	No scoring
John Murray		Goalie stats	Alexey Kuznetsov

23 March	Beibarys Atyrau	1–0	Kulager Petropavl	Khiuaz Dospanova Ice Palace, Atyrau
Alexey Ryzhikh - 18:23		First period	No scoring
No scoring		Second period	No scoring
No scoring		Third period	No scoring
Alexey Kuznetsov		Goalie stats	John Murray

Beibarys Atyrau won series 4–1

=== Final ===
==== Arlan Kokshetau vs. Beibarys Atyrau ====
3 April	Arlan Kokshetau	3–1	Beibarys Atyrau	Burabay Arena, Kokshetau
Konstantin Teslyukevich – 13:03		First period	No scoring
Teemu Virtala – 27:11		Second period	30:11 – Andrei Spiridonov
Marko Virtala – 57:31		Third period	No scoring

4 April	Arlan Kokshetau	2–3	Beibarys Atyrau	Burabay Arena, Kokshetau
Dušan Devečka – 05:30		First period	00:09 – Denis Makarov
No scoring		Second period	27:26 – Alexei Antsiferov
Marko Virtala - 42:47		Third period	59:46 – Ilya Malyushkin

8 April	Beibarys Atyrau	3–2 (OT)	Arlan Kokshetau	Khiuaz Dospanova Ice Palace, Atyrau
Eliezer Sherbatov – 01:58		First period	17:02 – Alexander Nurek; 19:02 – Anton Petrov
Denis Makarov – 36:09		Second period	No scoring
No scoring		Third period	No scoring
Maxim Sharifyanov – 71:58		Overtime	No scoring

9 April	Beibarys Atyrau	0–3	Arlan Kokshetau	Khiuaz Dospanova Ice Palace, Atyrau
No scoring		First period	17:27 – Vladimir Markelov
No scoring		Second period	36:20 – Dušan Devečka
No scoring		Third period	54:24 – Alexander Nurek

13 April	Arlan Kokshetau	0–1	Beibarys Atyrau	Burabay Arena, Kokshetau
No scoring		First period	17:12 – Alexei Antsiferov
No scoring		Second period	No scoring
No scoring		Third period	No scoring
Dmitri Voloshin		Goalie stats	Aleksei Kuznetsov

17 April	Beibarys Atyrau	0–2	Arlan Kokshetau	Khiuaz Dospanova Ice Palace, Atyrau
No scoring		First period	No scoring
No scoring		Second period	No scoring
No scoring		Third period	54:29 – Vladislav Kolesnikov – Rastislav Gašpar (ice hockey)
Aleksei Kuznetsov		Goalie stats	Dmitri Voloshin

20 April	Arlan Kokshetau	1–3	Beibarys Atyrau	Burabay Arena, Kokshetau

Beibarys Atyrau won series 4–3
