= 2003 Karjala Tournament =

Tournament details
- Host countries: Finland; Sweden
- Cities: Helsinki; Nyköping
- Venues: 2 (in 2 host cities)
- Dates: 6-9 November 2003
- Teams: 4

Final positions
- Champions: Finland (7th title)
- Runners-up: Czech Republic
- Third place: Russia
- Fourth place: Sweden

Tournament statistics
- Games played: 6
- Goals scored: 26 (4.33 per game)
- Attendance: 47,273 (7,879 per game)
- Scoring leader: (Russia) Maxim Sushinsky (4 points)

The 2003 Karjala Tournament was played between 6 and 9 November 2003. The Czech Republic, Finland, Sweden and Russia played a round-robin for a total of three games per team and six games in total. One game was played in Rosvalla, Nyköping, Sweden (Sweden vs Czech Republic) all the other games was played in Hartwall Areena, Helsinki. Finland won the tournament. The tournament was part of the 2003–04 Euro Hockey Tour.

== Standings ==
Pos	Team	Pld	W	OTW	OTL	L	GF	GA	GD	Pts
1	Finland	3	3	0	0	0	12	4	+8	9
2	Czech Republic	3	0	2	0	1	6	8	−2	4
3	Russia	3	1	0	1	1	6	6	0	4
4	Sweden	3	0	0	1	2	2	8	−6	1

Source: flashscore

== Games ==
Helsinki – (Eastern European Time – UTC+2) Nyköping– (Central European Time – UTC+1)

6 November 2003; 18:30	Finland	3-2 (2-1, 0-0, 1-1)	Russia	Hartwall Areena, Helsinki; Attendance: 6,265

Game reference

Fredrik Norrena
Goalies
Maksim Sokolov
Referee:
(Czech Republic) Milan Minar
Linesmen:
(Finland) Riku Peltonen
(Finland) Jouni Saukkonen

	0-1	06:21 – Vitali Proshkin (Roman Kukhtinov, Sergueï Moziakin) (PP)
02:43 – Jukka Hentunen (Erkki Rajamäki, Marko Kiprusoff)	1-1
16:18 – Toni Dahlman (Janne Laakkonen, Jarkko Immonen)	2-1
	2-2	48:26 – Aleksandr Boïkov
47:21 - Toni Dahlman (Petteri Nummelin)	3-2

8 min
Penalties
24 min
35
Shots
25

6 November 2003; 18:00	Sweden	1-2 GWS (1-0, 0-1, 0–0) (OT: 0–0) (SO: 0–1)	Czech Republic	Rosvalla, Nyköping; Attendance: 5,008

Game reference
Stefan Liv	Goalies	Adam Svoboda	Referee: (Finland) Hannu Henriksson; Linesmen: (Sweden) Mikael Ljungqvist (Sweden) Leo Takula
12:31 – Niklas Anger (Johan Davidsson) / 1-0; / 1-1 / 38:34 – Jaroslav Hlinka (Jirí Vykoukal, Petr Kadlec) (PP)			Referee: (Finland) Hannu Henriksson; Linesmen: (Sweden) Mikael Ljungqvist (Sweden) Leo Takula
Steen (miss)	Shootout	Divišek	Referee: (Finland) Hannu Henriksson; Linesmen: (Sweden) Mikael Ljungqvist (Sweden) Leo Takula
10 min	Penalties	8 min	Referee: (Finland) Hannu Henriksson; Linesmen: (Sweden) Mikael Ljungqvist (Sweden) Leo Takula
40	Shots	25	Referee: (Finland) Hannu Henriksson; Linesmen: (Sweden) Mikael Ljungqvist (Sweden) Leo Takula

8 November 2003; 15:00	Russia	2-0 (0-0, 1-0, 1-0)	Sweden	Hartwall Areena, Helsinki; Attendance: 6,352

Game reference
Maksim Sokolov	Goalies	Henrik Lundqvist	Referee: (Finland) Timo Favorin; Linesmen: (Finland) Juha Kautto (Finland) Mikko Kekäläinen
23:02 – Sergueï Korolev (Dmitri Bykov, Maksim Sushinsky) / 1-0; 50:37 – Kukhtinov (Maksim Sushinsky, Sergueï Korolev) / 2-0			Referee: (Finland) Timo Favorin; Linesmen: (Finland) Juha Kautto (Finland) Mikko Kekäläinen
12 min	Penalties	10 min	Referee: (Finland) Timo Favorin; Linesmen: (Finland) Juha Kautto (Finland) Mikko Kekäläinen
22	Shots	38	Referee: (Finland) Timo Favorin; Linesmen: (Finland) Juha Kautto (Finland) Mikko Kekäläinen

8 November 2003; 18:30	Finland	5-1 (4-0, 0-0, 1-1)	Czech Republic	Hartwall Areena, Helsinki; Attendance: 11,324

Game reference

Mika Lehto
Goalies
Adam Svoboda Roman Málek
Referee:
(Russia) Sergueï Karabanov
Linesmen:
(Finland) Antti Hämäläinen
(Finland) Tuomo Sorakangas

06:26 – Mikko Eloranta (Tuukka Mäntylä, Jari Viuhkola) (PP)	1-0
06:46 – Jarkko Immonen (Marko Tuulola)	2-0
08:36 – Tomi Kallio (Timo Pärssinen)	3-0
19:46 – Jari Viuhkola (Petri Pakaslahti)	4-0
	4-1	50:58 – Radek Duda (Jaroslav Balaštík, Jaroslav Hlinka) (PP)
58:36 – Janne Laakkonen	5-1

8 min
Penalties
4 min
33
Shots
8

9 November 2003; 14:30	Russia	2-3 GWS (0-1, 0-0, 2-1) (OT: 0–0) (SO: 0–1)	Czech Republic	Hartwall Areena, Helsinki; Attendance: 8,321

Game reference

Vadim Tarasov
Goalies
Roman Malek
Referee:
(Finland) Tom Laaksonen
Linesmen:
(Finland) Mikko Kekäinen
(Finland) Petri Nokisalmi

	0-1	10:10 – Jan Hejda (Radek Duda, Petr Kadlec) (PP)
47:02 – Maksim Sushinsky (Sergueï Korolev) (PP)	1-1
53:40 – Vasili Turkovsky (Maksim Sushinsky, Aleksandr Boïkov)	2-1
	2-2	54:52 – Tomáš Divišek (Petr Sýkora)

Moziakin (miss)
Shootout
Šup
2 min
Penalties
10 min
35
Shots
22

9 November 2003; 18:30	Finland	4-1 (1-0, 3-1, 0-0)	Sweden	Hartwall Areena, Helsinki; Attendance: 10,003

Game reference

Fredrik Norrena
Goalies
Henrik Lundqvist
Referees:
(Sweden)
(Sweden)
Linesmen:
(Sweden)
(Sweden)

13:18 – Petteri Nummelin (Kimmo Rintanen, Timo Pärssinen) (PP)	1-0
23:12 – Petteri Nummelin (Timo Pärssinen) (PP)	2-0
23:40 – Ville Peltonen (Tuukka Mäntylä, Mikko Eloranta) (PP)	3-0
	3-1	24:07 – Andreas Salomonsson (Per Svartvadet)
37:52 – Jere Karalahti (Janne Laakkonen)	4-1

12 min
Penalties
14 min
25
Shots
24

== Scoring leaders ==
Pos	Player	Country	GP	G	A	Pts	+/−	PIM	POS
1	Maxim Sushinsky	Russia	3	1	3	4	+3	0	LD
2	Toni Dahlman	Finland	3	2	1	3	+4	0	RW
3	Petteri Nummelin	Finland	3	2	1	3	+2	2	RD
4	Jarkko Immonen	Finland	3	1	2	3	+4	0	CE
5	Sergei Korolyov	Russia	3	1	2	3	+3	0	LW

GP = Games played; G = Goals; A = Assists; Pts = Points; +/− = Plus/minus; PIM = Penalties in minutes; POS = Position
Source: swehockey

== Goaltending leaders ==
Pos	Player	Country	TOI	GA	GAA	Sv%	SO
1	Roman Málek	Czech Republic	105:00	3	1.71	94.64	0
2	Fredrik Norrena	Finland	120:00	3	1.50	93.88	0
3	Maxim Sokolov	Russia	120:00	3	1.50	91.43	1
4	Adam Svoboda	Czech Republic	85:00	5	3.53	90.38	0
5	Henrik Lundqvist	Sweden	119:13	6	3.02	87.23	0

TOI = Time on ice (minutes:seconds); SA = Shots against; GA = Goals against; GAA = Goals Against Average; Sv% = Save percentage; SO = Shutouts
Source: swehockey

== Tournament awards ==
The tournament directorate named the following players in the tournament 2003:

- Best goalkeeper: (Russia) Maxim Sokolov
- Best defenceman: (Finland) Petteri Nummelin
- Best forward: (Finland) Jarkko Immonen

Media All-Star Team:

- Goaltender: (Finland) Fredrik Norrena
- Defence: (Finland) Marko Tuulola, (Finland) Petteri Nummelin
- Forwards: (Finland) Ville Peltonen, (Finland) Jarkko Immonen, (Russia) Maksim Sushinsky
