= Albert Vishnyakov =

Russian ice hockey player

- Born: December 30, 1983 (age 42) Almetyevsk, Soviet Union
- Height: 6 ft 1 in (185 cm)
- Weight: 178 lb (81 kg; 12 st 10 lb)
- Position: Left wing
- Shot: Right
- KHL team Former teams: Metallurg Novokuznetsk; Torpedo Nizhny Novgorod; Ak Bars Kazan; HC Neftekhimik Nizhnekamsk; HC Dynamo Moscow; HC Spartak Moscow
- NHL draft: 273rd overall, 2003; Tampa Bay Lightning
- Playing career: 2001–2021

Albert Vishnyakov (born December 30, 1983) is a Russian professional ice hockey forward. He currently plays for Metallurg Novokuznetsk in the Kontinental Hockey League (KHL). Vishnyakov was drafted in the 9th round (273rd overall) of the 2003 NHL entry draft by the Tampa Bay Lightning.

== Career statistics ==
| | | | Regular season | | | | | Playoffs |
| Season | Team | League | GP | G | A | Pts | PIM | GP | G | A | Pts | PIM |
|---|---|---|---|---|---|---|---|---|---|---|---|---|
| 1999–2000 | Neftyanik–2 Almetyevsk | RUS.3 | 41 | 11 | 5 | 16 | 68 | — | — | — | — | — |
| 2000–01 | Neftyanik Almetyevsk | RUS.2 | 18 | 0 | 0 | 0 | 2 | 7 | 0 | 0 | 0 | 0 |
| 2000–01 | Neftyanik–2 Almetyevsk | RUS.3 | 40 | 13 | 15 | 28 | 7 | — | — | — | — | — |
| 2001–02 | Torpedo Nizhny Novgorod | RSL | 6 | 1 | 0 | 1 | 0 | — | — | — | — | — |
| 2001–02 | Torpedo–2 Nizhny Novgorod | RUS.3 | 4 | 2 | 2 | 4 | 10 | — | — | — | — | — |
| 2001–02 | Ak Bars Kazan | RSL | 10 | 0 | 1 | 1 | 2 | — | — | — | — | — |
| 2001–02 | Ak Bars–2 Kazan | RUS.3 | 13 | 5 | 4 | 9 | 8 | — | — | — | — | — |
| 2002–03 | Ak Bars Kazan | RSL | 47 | 7 | 6 | 13 | 47 | 5 | 1 | 0 | 1 | 0 |
| 2002–03 | Ak Bars–2 Kazan | RUS.3 | 1 | 0 | 0 | 0 | 0 | — | — | — | — | — |
| 2003–04 | Ak Bars Kazan | RSL | 10 | 1 | 1 | 2 | 8 | — | — | — | — | — |
| 2003–04 | Ak Bars–2 Kazan | RUS.3 | 11 | 7 | 9 | 16 | 53 | — | — | — | — | — |
| 2003–04 | Neftekhimik Nizhnekamsk | RSL | 10 | 2 | 3 | 5 | 10 | — | — | — | — | — |
| 2003–04 | Neftekhimik–2 Nizhnekamsk | RUS.3 | 7 | 1 | 3 | 4 | 8 | — | — | — | — | — |
| 2004–05 | Dynamo Moscow | RSL | 28 | 1 | 2 | 3 | 10 | — | — | — | — | — |
| 2005–06 | Dynamo Moscow | RSL | 48 | 9 | 3 | 12 | 78 | 3 | 0 | 0 | 0 | 0 |
| 2006–07 | Dynamo Moscow | RSL | 33 | 9 | 6 | 15 | 36 | 1 | 0 | 0 | 0 | 0 |
| 2006–07 | Dynamo–2 Moscow | RUS.3 | 2 | 3 | 2 | 5 | 0 | — | — | — | — | — |
| 2007–08 | Spartak Moscow | RSL | 8 | 2 | 0 | 2 | 14 | — | — | — | — | — |
| 2007–08 | Spartak–2 Moscow | RUS.3 | 17 | 8 | 8 | 16 | 30 | — | — | — | — | — |
| 2007–08 | Metallurg Novokuznetsk | RSL | 19 | 1 | 7 | 8 | 12 | — | — | — | — | — |
| 2008–09 | Metallurg Novokuznetsk | KHL | 50 | 6 | 9 | 15 | 28 | — | — | — | — | — |
| 2009–10 | Metallurg Novokuznetsk | KHL | 52 | 11 | 9 | 20 | 42 | — | — | — | — | — |
| 2010–11 | Metallurg Novokuznetsk | KHL | 6 | 0 | 1 | 1 | 2 | — | — | — | — | — |
| 2010–11 | Neftekhimik Nizhnekamsk | KHL | 9 | 0 | 0 | 0 | 8 | — | — | — | — | — |
| 2010–11 | Molot Perm | VHL | 10 | 1 | 3 | 4 | 26 | — | — | — | — | — |
| 2011–12 | Neftyanik Almetyevsk | VHL | 28 | 4 | 9 | 13 | 57 | — | — | — | — | — |
| 2011–12 | Ariada Volzhsk | VHL | 16 | 4 | 6 | 10 | 36 | 5 | 0 | 3 | 3 | 6 |
| 2012–13 | Ariada Volzhsk | VHL | 26 | 2 | 10 | 12 | 24 | — | — | — | — | — |
| 2012–13 | Neftyanik Almetyevsk | VHL | 2 | 0 | 0 | 0 | 0 | — | — | — | — | — |
| 2013–14 | HC Astana | KAZ | 30 | 8 | 6 | 14 | 42 | — | — | — | — | — |
| 2013–14 | Beibarys Atyrau | KAZ | 16 | 9 | 7 | 16 | 36 | 13 | 2 | 4 | 6 | 39 |
| 2014–15 | HC Lipetsk | VHL | 50 | 16 | 10 | 26 | 50 | 5 | 0 | 3 | 3 | 6 |
| 2015–16 | Beibarys Atyrau | KAZ | 26 | 8 | 15 | 23 | 18 | 4 | 0 | 0 | 0 | 4 |
| 2016–17 | Beibarys Atyrau | KAZ | 38 | 5 | 16 | 21 | 63 | 2 | 0 | 0 | 0 | 0 |
| 2017–18 | Beibarys Atyrau | KAZ | 43 | 14 | 13 | 27 | 48 | 14 | 1 | 8 | 9 | 10 |
| 2018–19 | Beibarys Atyrau | KAZ | 52 | 15 | 25 | 40 | 66 | 14 | 3 | 4 | 7 | 10 |
| 2019–20 | Beibarys Atyrau | KAZ | 60 | 22 | 21 | 43 | 64 | — | — | — | — | — |
| 2019–20 | Dnipro Kherson | UKR | — | — | — | — | — | 5 | 1 | 4 | 5 | 6 |
| 2020–21 | Dnipro Kherson | UKR | 19 | 6 | 12 | 18 | 12 | — | — | — | — | — |
| 2020–21 | Kulager Petropavl | KAZ | 16 | 2 | 4 | 6 | 42 | 4 | 1 | 1 | 2 | 2 |
| RSL totals | | | 219 | 33 | 29 | 62 | 217 | 9 | 1 | 0 | 1 | 0 |
| KHL totals | | | 117 | 17 | 19 | 36 | 80 | — | — | — | — | — |
| KAZ totals | | | 281 | 83 | 107 | 190 | 379 | 51 | 7 | 17 | 24 | 65 |
