= Igor Valeev =

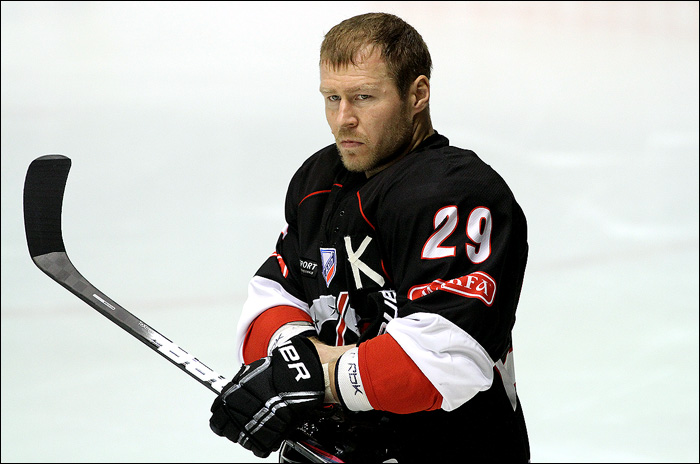
- Born: 9 January 1981 (age 45) Snezhinsk, Russian SFSR, Soviet Union
- Height: 6 ft 0 in (183 cm)
- Weight: 212 lb (96 kg; 15 st 2 lb)
- Position: Left wing
- Shot: Left
- Played for: Sibir Novosibirsk; Arystan Temirtau; Traktor Chelyabinsk; Torpedo-Ust-Kamenogorsk 2 Traktor Chelyabinsk; Kulager Petropavl; Edinburgh Capitals
- NHL draft: 122nd overall, 2001; St. Louis Blues
- Playing career: 2000–2018

Igor Valeev (born 9 January 1981) is a retired Russian professional ice hockey player who last played for the Edinburgh Capitals. Valeev previously played with Chelmet Chelyabinsk in the Vysshaya hokkeinaya liga (VHL), and was selected by the St. Louis Blues in the fourth round (122nd overall) of the 2001 NHL entry draft.

== Career statistics ==
			Regular season					Playoffs
Season	Team	League	GP	G	A	Pts	PIM	GP	G	A	Pts	PIM
1998–99	Lethbridge Hurricanes	WHL	8	2	3	5	13	—	—	—	—	—
1998–99	Saskatoon Blades	WHL	23	2	2	4	36	—	—	—	—	—
1999–2000	Swift Current Broncos	WHL	36	7	5	12	78	6	0	0	0	19
2000–01	North Bay Centennials	OHL	62	17	61	78	175	4	0	1	1	22
2000–01	Muskegon Fury	UHL	—	—	—	—	—	3	0	1	1	2
2001–02	Worcester IceCats	AHL	29	3	6	9	72	—	—	—	—	—
2002–03	Worcester IceCats	AHL	72	6	12	18	153	3	0	0	0	2
2003–04	Worcester IceCats	AHL	31	1	3	4	68	—	—	—	—	—
2003–04	Peoria Rivermen	ECHL	11	5	8	13	33	3	0	0	0	17
2004–05	Worcester IceCats	AHL	19	0	3	3	27	—	—	—	—	—
2004–05	Peoria Rivermen	ECHL	35	7	17	24	75	—	—	—	—	—
2005–06	Sibir Novosibirsk	RSL	10	0	1	1	14	—	—	—	—	—
2005–06	Sibir–2 Novosibirsk	RUS.3	1	2	0	2	2	—	—	—	—	—
2006–07	Avtomobilist Yekaterinburg	RUS.2	5	1	0	1	4	—	—	—	—	—
2006–07	Avtomobilist–2 Yekaterinburg	RUS.4	3	3	2	5	10	—	—	—	—	—
2006–07	Mechel Chelyabinsk	RUS.2	8	2	4	6	12	3	1	1	2	20
2007–08	Avtomobilist Yekaterinburg	RUS.2	7	0	1	1	10	—	—	—	—	—
2007–08	Gazovik Tyumen	RUS.2	31	7	11	18	99	—	—	—	—	—
2008–09	Gazovik Tyumen	RUS.2	28	6	8	14	22	—	—	—	—	—
2008–09	Molot–Prikamye Perm	RUS.2	23	4	11	15	73	9	1	3	4	12
2009–10	Molot–Prikamye Perm	RUS.2	43	10	9	19	105	9	0	1	1	28
2010–11	Molot–Prikamye Perm	VHL	24	0	3	3	44	—	—	—	—	—
2010–11	Arystan Temirtau	KAZ	9	2	3	5	37	4	0	0	0	2
2011–12	Kazzinc–Torpedo	VHL	30	7	7	14	57	5	1	2	3	4
2011–12	Torpedo–2 Ust–Kamenogorsk	KAZ	1	0	1	1	0	—	—	—	—	—
2012–13	Buran Voronezh	VHL	47	5	11	16	69	16	2	4	6	14
2013–14	Traktor Chelyabinsk	KHL	37	2	4	6	30	—	—	—	—	—
2013–14	Chelmet Chelyabinsk	VHL	17	2	4	6	28	—	—	—	—	—
2014–15	Chelmet Chelyabinsk	VHL	41	3	10	13	35	—	—	—	—	—
2015–16	Kulager Petropavl	KAZ	45	10	17	27	80	8	1	3	4	18
2016–17	Chelmet Chelyabinsk	VHL	11	2	5	7	4	—	—	—	—	—
2017–18	Edinburgh Capitals	EIHL	49	8	17	25	89	—	—	—	—	—
AHL totals			151	10	24	34	320	3	0	0	0	2
RSL & KHL totals			47	2	5	7	44	—	—	—	—	—
RUS.2 & VHL totals			315	49	84	133	562	42	5	11	16	78
