= Nursultan Belgibayev =

Kazakhstani ice hockey player

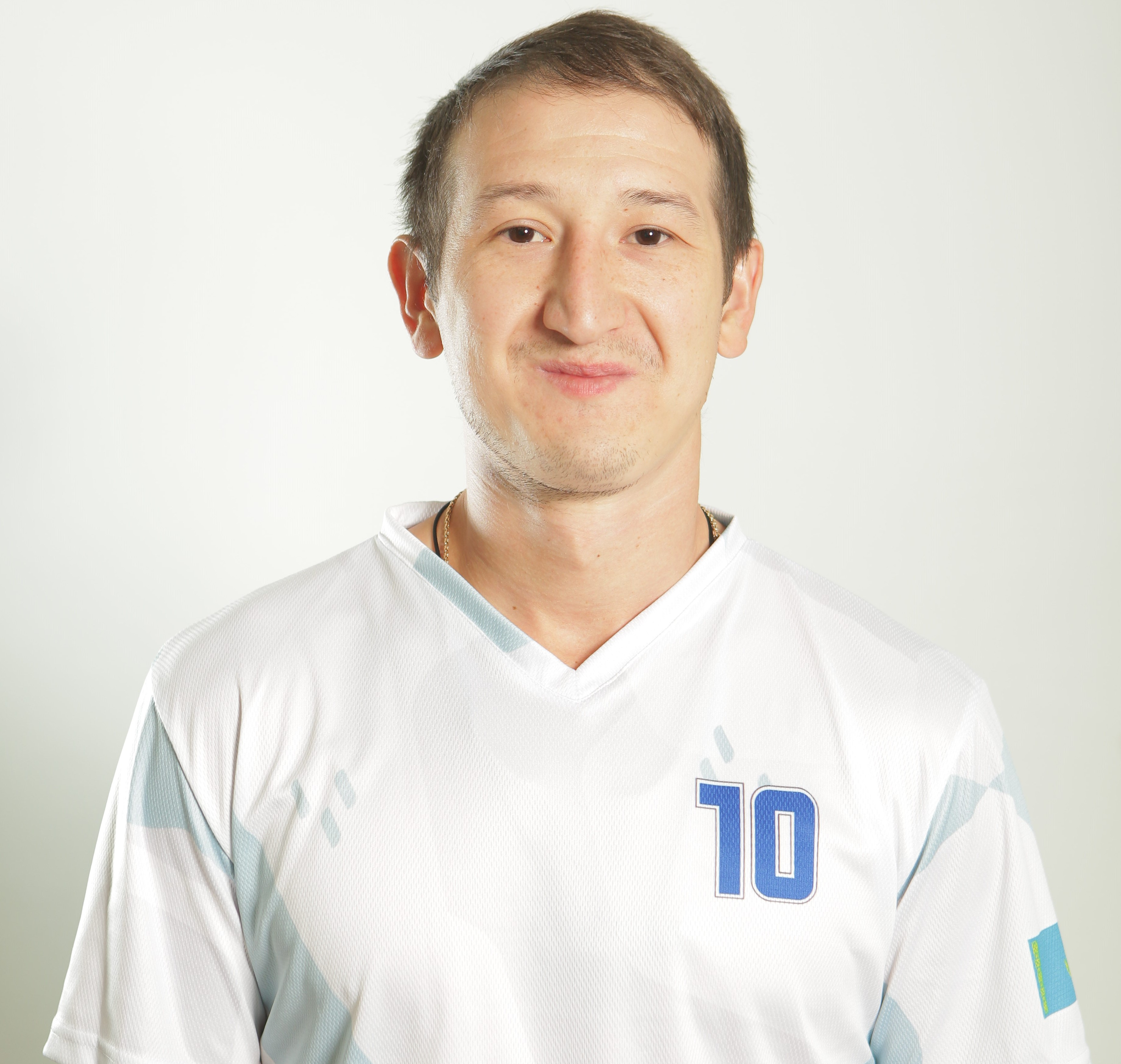
- Born: August 3, 1991 (age 35) Tselinograd, Kazakh SSR, Soviet Union
- Height: 5 ft 11 in (180 cm)
- Weight: 165 lb (75 kg; 11 st 11 lb)
- Position: Forward
- Shot: Left
- Played for: Barys Astana
- National team: Kazakhstan
- Playing career: 2009–2025

Nursultan Kairatuly Belgibayev (Kazakh: Нұрсұлтан Қайратұлы Белгібаев, Nūrsūltan Qairatūly Belgıbaev; born August 3, 1991) is a Kazakhstani former professional ice hockey player. He played as a forward for Barys Astana of the Kontinental Hockey League (KHL). On May 26, 2017, Belgibayev was signed to a two-year contract extension to continue with Astana from whom he has been under contract for the entirety of his professional career.

== Career statistics ==
=== Regular season and playoffs ===
			Regular season					Playoffs
Season	Team	League	GP	G	A	Pts	PIM	GP	G	A	Pts	PIM
2009–10	Nomad Astana	KAZ	46	6	13	19	113	—	—	—	—	—
2010–11	Nomad Astana	KAZ	45	5	9	14	28	11	0	0	0	4
2011–12	Nomad Astana	KAZ	4	0	1	1	6	—	—	—	—	—
2011–12	Snezhnye Barsy Astana	MHL	55	5	22	27	44	10	0	5	5	6
2012–13	Nomad Astana	KAZ	39	8	18	26	24	5	1	1	2	0
2012–13	Snezhnye Barsy Astana	MHL	5	2	2	4	8	—	—	—	—	—
2013–14	Nomad Astana	KAZ	43	9	7	16	57	6	0	0	0	0
2014–15	Nomad Astana	KAZ	49	9	17	26	60	7	1	3	4	6
2015–16	Nomad Astana	KAZ	30	7	11	18	24	5	2	0	2	6
2016–17	Barys Astana	KHL	40	2	3	5	4	—	—	—	—	—
2016–17	Nomad Astana	KAZ	3	0	0	0	0	9	2	2	4	6
2017–18	Barys Astana	KHL	11	0	1	1	4	—	—	—	—	—
2017–18	Nomad Astana	KAZ	32	7	8	15	28	15	2	0	2	16
2018–19	Altay-Torpedo	KAZ	49	15	15	30	41	4	0	0	0	0
2019–20	HC Almaty	KAZ	52	14	17	31	24	—	—	—	—	—
KHL totals			51	2	4	6	8	—	—	—	—	—

=== International ===
Year	Team	Event	Result	GP	G	A	Pts	PIM
2010	Kazakhstan	WJC D1	17th	5	3	5	8	4
2011	Kazakhstan	WJC D1	18th	5	1	2	3	2
2016	Kazakhstan	OGQ	NQ	3	0	0	0	2
2017	Kazakhstan	AWG	1st place, gold medalist(s)	3	0	1	1	0
Junior totals				10	4	7	11	6
Senior totals				6	0	1	1	2
