= Laakkonen =

Laakkonen is a Finnish surname. Notable people with the surname include:

- Kaija Saariaho (1952–2023), née Laakkonen, Finnish composer
- Risto Laakkonen (born 1967), Finnish ski jumper
- Sami Laakkonen (born 1974), Finnish bandy player
- Janne Laakkonen (born 1982), Finnish professional ice hockey player
- Saila Laakkonen, Finnish actress
