= Vidgren (surname) =

Vidgren is a Swedish-language surname, more common in Finland than in Sweden.

== Geographical distribution ==
As of 2014, 71.9% of all known bearers of the surname Vidgren were residents of Finland (frequency 1:12,665), 24.7% of Sweden (1:66,086) and 1.8% of Denmark (1:513,140).

In Finland, the frequency of the surname was higher than national average (1:12,665) in the following regions:

1. Northern Savonia (1:1,989)
2. Päijänne Tavastia (1:5,269)
3. Central Finland (1:7,047)
4. Kainuu (1:10,241)

In Sweden, the frequency of the surname was higher than national average (1:66,086) in the following counties:

1. Norrbotten County (1:3,800)
2. Uppsala County (1:34,976)
3. Gävleborg County (1:35,004)
4. Södermanland County (1:39,888)
5. Gotland County (1:58,481)
6. Stockholm County (1:60,638)
7. Kronoberg County (1:63,793)

== People ==
- Tony Vidgren (born 1990), Finnish ice hockey player
