= Peter Fabuš =

Slovak ice hockey player (born 1979)

- Born: July 15, 1979 (age 46) Ilava, Czechoslovakia
- Height: 6 ft 2 in (188 cm)
- Weight: 201 lb (91 kg; 14 st 5 lb)
- Position: Forward
- Shot: Right
- POL team Former teams: JKH GKS Jastrzębie; HK Dubnica; MsHK Žilina; HK Dukla Trenčín; Mora IK; HC Oceláři Třinec; HC Plzeň; BK Mladá Boleslav; HC Košice; HK Neman Grodno; Yertis Pavlodar; HSC Csíkszereda
- National team: Slovakia
- NHL draft: 281st overall, 2000; Phoenix Coyotes
- Playing career: 1999–2020

Peter Fabuš (born July 15, 1979) is a Slovak professional ice hockey player who currently plays for JKH GKS Jastrzębie of the Polska Hokej Liga.

Fabuš was drafted 281st overall by the Phoenix Coyotes in the 2000 NHL entry draft from HK Dukla Trenčín. He played in the American Hockey League for the Springfield Falcons during the 2002-03 season before returning to Dukla Trenčín. He has also played in the Elitserien for Mora IK and in the Czech Extraliga for HC Oceláři Třinec, HC Plzeň and BK Mladá Boleslav.

== Career statistics ==
=== Regular season and playoffs ===
			Regular season					Playoffs
Season	Team	League	GP	G	A	Pts	PIM	GP	G	A	Pts	PIM
1996–97	Spartak Dubnica nad Váhom	SVK	1	0	0	0	0	—	—	—	—	—
1997–98	Spartak Dubnica nad Váhom	SVK.2	38	4	4	8	26	—	—	—	—	—
1998–99	MsHK Žilina	SVK.2	26	7	8	15	24	—	—	—	—	—
1999–2000	Dukla Trenčín	SVK	54	20	11	31	34	5	1	1	2	0
2000–01	Dukla Trenčín	SVK	52	31	22	53	94	14	4	6	10	60
2001–02	Dukla Trenčín	SVK	28	14	11	25	65	—	—	—	—	—
2001–02	Springfield Falcons	AHL	6	0	0	0	2	—	—	—	—	—
2002–03	Springfield Falcons	AHL	33	5	7	12	25	1	0	0	0	0
2003–04	Dukla Trenčín	SVK	50	18	18	36	60	14	8	6	14	16
2004–05	Dukla Trenčín	SVK	53	18	18	36	95	12	7	7	14	6
2004–05	ŠHK 37 Piešťany	SVK.2	1	1	1	2	0	—	—	—	—	—
2005–06	Mora IK	SEL	18	0	2	2	6	—	—	—	—	—
2005–06	HC Oceláři Třinec	ELH	23	5	5	10	28	4	1	1	2	6
2006–07	HC Lasselsberger Plzeň	ELH	47	16	7	23	58	—	—	—	—	—
2007–08	HC Lasselsberger Plzeň	ELH	49	18	13	31	24	4	0	0	0	0
2008–09	HC Lasselsberger Plzeň	ELH	34	17	15	32	14	—	—	—	—	—
2009–10	BK Mladá Boleslav	ELH	52	16	15	31	40	—	—	—	—	—
2010–11	BK Mladá Boleslav	ELH	15	4	4	8	6	—	—	—	—	—
2010–11	HC Košice	SVK	12	4	3	7	2	14	3	9	12	0
2011–12	HC Košice	SVK	25	6	11	17	2	—	—	—	—	—
2011–12	Dukla Trenčín	SVK	28	16	9	25	10	10	6	2	8	6
2012–13	Dukla Trenčín	SVK	5	2	2	4	4	—	—	—	—	—
2012–13	Neman Grodno	BLR	38	16	11	27	22	12	2	3	5	18
2013–14	Yertis Pavlodar	KAZ	47	20	16	36	47	13	4	5	9	2
2014–15	Yertis Pavlodar	KAZ	38	17	16	33	22	3	1	1	2	0
2015–16	Yertis Pavlodar	KAZ	50	10	22	32	22	12	4	8	12	0
2016–17	Yertis Pavlodar	KAZ	53	17	29	46	6	9	2	3	5	2
2017–18	HSC Csíkszereda	EL	37	19	15	34	14	7	3	2	5	4
2017–18	HSC Csíkszereda	ROU	23	15	17	32	2	8	8	8	16	6
2018–19	JKH GKS Jastrzębie	POL	41	18	25	43	18	4	0	1	1	0
2019–20	Hull Pirates	GBR.2	27	11	20	31	14	—	—	—	—	—
2019–20	MHK Dubnica nad Váhom	SVK.2	6	1	3	4	2	—	—	—	—	—
SVK totals			308	129	105	234	366	69	29	31	60	88
ELH totals			220	76	59	135	170	8	1	1	2	6
KAZ totals			188	64	83	147	97	37	11	17	28	4

=== International ===
Year	Team	Event	GP	G	A	Pts	PIM
2008	Slovakia	WC	5	0	2	2	4
Senior totals			5	0	2	2	4
