= 2026 Monaco bombing =

Targeted parcel bombing

- Location: 43°44′46″N 7°25′48″E; 4 Rue Révérend Père Louis Frolla, Monaco
- Date: 29 June 2026 c.21:00 (CEST; UTC+02:00)
- Target: Vadym Yermolaiev
- Attack type: Parcel bombing (IED)
- Weapons: Backpack parcel bomb containing bolts and metal fragments (shrapnel)
- Deaths: 0
- Injuries: 3
- Perpetrator: Unknown
- Motive: Under investigation (possible targeted attack)
- Inquiry: Monaco Police; French National Gendarmerie

On 29 June 2026, an explosion occurred at the entrance of a residential building at 4 Rue Révérend Père Louis Frolla in Monaco, near the Monaco-France border. Three people were injured including two adults, left in critical condition, as well as a 13-year-old child. The blast was caused by an improvised explosive device (IED) reportedly in a backpack left at the scene by an unidentified suspect, who fled toward France shortly after the detonation. Le Monde reported that it was "a settling of scores linked to organized crime". On 9 July, one of the suspects in the bombing was found dead, and two other people suspected of being involved in the bombing were arrested for her death.

== Explosion ==
The explosion occurred shortly before 9 pm. Officials described it as a parcel bomb. The suspect dropped a package or backpack at the entrance of a residential building on Rue Révérend Père Louis Frolla shortly before the explosion. The explosive device contained buckshot and bolts. It was detonated via remote control right after the three victims had returned from dinner at a seaside restaurant. The building was close to the French border. The blast was felt as far away as Nice, France, 13 miles away, Stéphane Thibault, Monaco’s prosecutor, said at a news conference. The main target was considered to be Vadym Iermolaiev, a Ukrainian-born oligarch. An unnamed woman (Note: Initially it was reported that she was Iermolaiev's wife, but Yermolaiev’s wife has since stated she was not in the home at the time of the attack and therefore was not hurt.) had life-threatening injuries, and Ukrainian sources reported her legs were amputated soon after arriving in hospital. Iermolaiev himself sustained burns and shrapnel injuries, while a young man whose identity was also not released suffered less serious injuries. Two further people were in a state of shock.

=== Suspect ===
An Interpol red notice was issued for Ukrainian citizen Anastasiia Berezovska who was the main suspect behind the attack. The Deputy Prosecutor of Monaco, Morgan Raymond stated that the attacker had walked across the nearby border just meters from the property, before fleeing in a car rented in Germany. And then returned to Germany via several European countries. German authorities have said that the rental apartment and vehicle of Berezovska had been searched and that evidence would be shared with Monegasque authorities. On 6 July 2026 Berezovska was found dead near Kyiv. Sources of Ukrainska Pravda stated she had been shot dead. The same sources stated Berezovska had left Ukraine on 22 March 2025 and had returned on 1 July 2026. It was also reported that an active officer in the Ukraine Main Directorate of Intelligence and a former law enforcement officer were detained as suspects.

== Reactions ==
Minister of State Christophe Mirmand said that it was the first time in the history of Monaco that such an attack had occurred. A possible motive is being investigated.

Sources of Ukrainska Pravda linked the attack with scam call centers in Ukraine, in particular in Dnipro. On 4 December 2025 Iermolaiev's son Artur was detained in Cyprus and extradited to Estonia. Estonian investigators accused Artur Iermolaiev, along with three other defendants, of having created fraudulent call centers in Ukraine. Artur Iermolaiev entered into a plea bargain with the Estonian court, received a suspended sentence and paid an €8.5 million fine, and then left Estonia. He has since been banned from entering Estonia.
