= Konstantin Baranov =

Russian ice hockey player (born 1982)

- Born: January 11, 1982 (age 44) Omsk, USSR
- Height: 5 ft 11 in (180 cm)
- Weight: 174 lb (79 kg; 12 st 6 lb)
- Position: Forward
- Shot: Left
- VHL team Former teams: HC Sarov; Russian Superleague; Avangard Omsk; Salavat Yulaev Ufa; HC Mechel; HC Lada Togliatti; HC CSKA Moscow; HC Dynamo Moscow; SKA Saint Petersburg; Amur Khabarovsk; Metallurg Novokuznetsk
- NHL draft: 126th overall, 2002; Philadelphia Flyers
- Playing career: 1998–2020

Konstantin Petrovich Baranov (Russian: Константин Петрович Баранов; born January 11, 1982) is a Russian professional ice hockey player who currently plays for HC Sarov of the Russian Major League (VHL). He was selected by the Philadelphia Flyers in the 4th round (126th overall) of the 2002 NHL entry draft.

== Career statistics ==
			Regular season					Playoffs
Season	Team	League	GP	G	A	Pts	PIM	GP	G	A	Pts	PIM
1997–98	Avangard–2 Omsk	RUS.3	7	1	0	1	2	—	—	—	—	—
1998–99	Avangard Omsk	RSL	1	0	0	0	0	2	0	0	0	0
1998–99	Avangard–VDV Omsk	RUS.3	23	16	8	24	40	—	—	—	—	—
1999–2000	Avangard Omsk	RSL	1	0	0	0	2	—	—	—	—	—
1999–2000	Avangard–VDV Omsk	RUS.3	33	15	8	23	46	—	—	—	—	—
2000–01	Kristall Saratov	RUS.2	26	6	9	15	26	—	—	—	—	—
2000–01	Kristall–2 Saratov	RUS.3	7	6	5	11	4	—	—	—	—	—
2000–01	Salavat Yulaev Ufa	RSL	8	1	0	1	4	—	—	—	—	—
2001–02	Avangard Omsk	RSL	5	0	0	0	6	—	—	—	—	—
2001–02	Avangard–VDV Omsk	RUS.3	5	4	1	5	2	—	—	—	—	—
2001–02	Mechel Chelyabinsk	RSL	6	1	2	3	2	—	—	—	—	—
2001–02	Lada Togliatti	RSL	20	2	4	6	18	3	0	2	2	0
2002–03	Avangard Omsk	RSL	6	0	1	1	2	—	—	—	—	—
2002–03	Avangard–VDV Omsk	RUS.3	3	4	6	10	2	—	—	—	—	—
2002–03	Salavat Yulaev Ufa	RSL	11	2	2	4	0	—	—	—	—	—
2002–03	CSKA Moscow	RSL	14	4	1	5	10	—	—	—	—	—
2003–04	Avangard Omsk	RSL	51	6	10	16	50	11	2	2	4	6
2004–05	Avangard Omsk	RSL	21	3	2	5	16	—	—	—	—	—
2004–05	Omskie Yastreby	RUS.3	9	5	8	13	24	—	—	—	—	—
2005–06	Dynamo Moscow	RSL	19	0	5	5	10	—	—	—	—	—
2005–06	Dynamo–2 Moscow	RUS.3	1	1	1	2	2	—	—	—	—	—
2005–06	SKA St. Petersburg	RSL	12	1	2	3	18	—	—	—	—	—
2005–06	SKA–2 St. Petersburg	RUS.3	2	0	1	1	4	—	—	—	—	—
2006–07	Amur Khabarovsk	RSL	7	0	1	1	16	—	—	—	—	—
2006–07	Metallurg Novokuznetsk	RSL	21	2	2	4	28	3	3	1	4	0
2007–08	Avtomobilist Yekaterinburg	RUS.2	4	0	0	0	26	—	—	—	—	—
2007–08	Avtomobilist–2 Yekaterinburg	RUS.3	6	3	2	5	10	—	—	—	—	—
2007–08	HC Dmitrov	RUS.2	33	5	14	19	56	2	1	0	1	0
2008–09	Gazovik Tyumen	RUS.2	31	5	11	16	50	—	—	—	—	—
2008–09	Kapitan Stupino	RUS.2	25	8	13	21	36	9	1	3	4	16
2009–10	HC Sarov	RUS.2	54	23	17	40	68	—	—	—	—	—
2010–11	HC Sarov	VHL	37	12	21	33	55	4	1	3	4	4
2011–12	Metallurg Zhlobin	BLR	44	19	17	36	50	14	6	7	13	14
2012–13	Metallurg Zhlobin	BLR	40	20	19	39	30	11	3	1	4	24
2013–14	Molot–Prikamye Perm	VHL	8	0	0	0	4	—	—	—	—	—
2013–14	HC Sarov	VHL	25	2	6	8	22	—	—	—	—	—
2014–15	HC Sarov	VHL	39	6	12	18	38	—	—	—	—	—
2015–16	Beibarys Atyrau	KAZ	44	15	12	27	42	13	2	5	7	6
2016–17	Beibarys Atyrau	KAZ	46	24	13	37	69	2	1	0	1	2
2017–18	Beibarys Atyrau	KAZ	28	5	8	13	12	14	0	1	1	8
2018–19	Beibarys Atyrau	KAZ	48	5	8	13	32	13	0	3	3	26
2019–20	Beibarys Atyrau	KAZ	20	7	4	11	39	—	—	—	—	—
RUS.2 & VHL totals			282	67	103	170	381	15	3	6	9	20
RSL totals			202	22	32	54	182	22	5	5	10	8
KAZ totals			186	56	45	101	194	42	3	9	12	42
