= Artyom Senkevich =

Belarusian ice hockey player

- Born: May 4, 1982 (age 42); Minsk, Belarusian SSR, Soviet Union
- Height: 6 ft 3 in (191 cm)
- Weight: 198 lb (90 kg; 14 st 2 lb)
- Position: Forward
- Shot: Left
- Played for: Yunost Minsk; Keramin Minsk; Khimvolokno Mogilev; HK Gomel; HK Vitebsk; HC Dinamo Minsk; Khimik-SKA Novopolotsk; HC Shakhtyor Soligorsk; Kulager Petropavl; Yertis Pavlodar
- National team: Belarus
- Playing career: 1998–2017

Artyom Sergeyevich Senkevich (Russian: Артём Сергеевич Сенькевич, Belarusian: Арцём Сяргеевіч Сянькевіч; born 4 May 1982) is a Belarusian former professional ice hockey player. He is currently the head coach of the United Arab Emirates national team.

He participated at the 2010 IIHF World Championship as a member of the Belarus National men's ice hockey team.
