= Janne Laakkonen =

Finnish ice hockey player

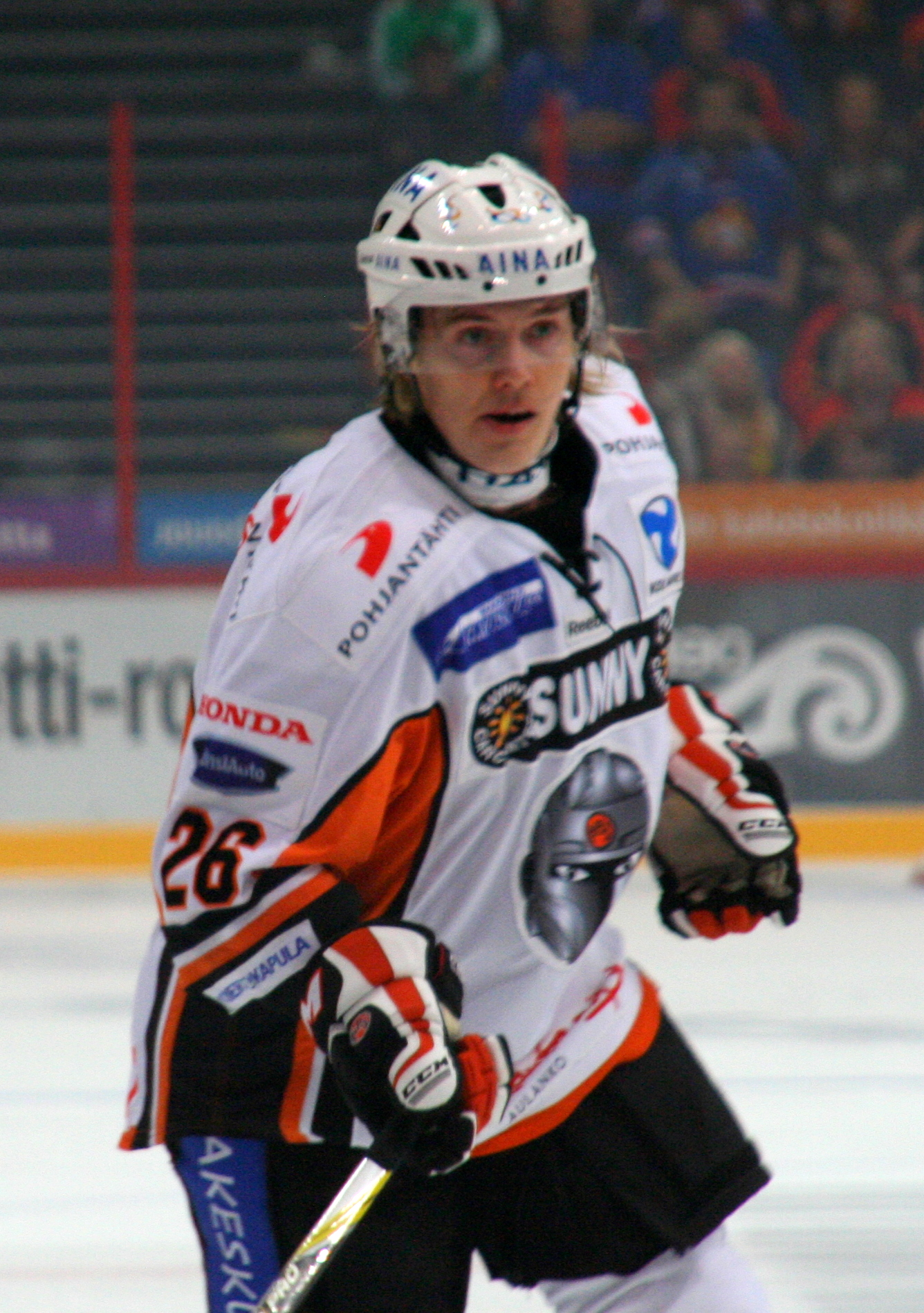
- Born: April 15, 1982 (age 44) Kuopio, Finland
- Height: 5 ft 9 in (175 cm)
- Weight: 181 lb (82 kg; 12 st 13 lb)
- Position: Left wing
- Shoots: Left
- NIHL team Former teams: Peterborough Phantoms; KalPa; HPK; Timrå IK; HIFK; Lempäälän Kisa; Ilves; IF Sundsvall Hockey; Arystan Temirtau; Yuzhny Ural Orsk; Kulager Petropavl; Neman Grodno; Gothiques d'Amiens; GKS Katowice; EHC Lustenau; Narvik IK; Coventry Blaze; Fife Flyers; FPS; UTE
- Playing career: 2000–present

Janne Laakkonen (born April 15, 1982) is a Finnish professional ice hockey left winger currently playing for UK National Ice Hockey League (NIHL) side Peterborough Phantoms. Laakkonen previously iced with Elite League sides Fife Flyers and Coventry Blaze.

== Career ==
Laakkonen began his career with KalPa, playing for their junior teams before making his debut for the main roster during the 2000-01 Suomi-sarja playoffs. He then moved to SM-liiga team HPK and stayed for four seasons. He had a brief spell in Sweden's Elitserien for Timrå IK in 2005–06, playing six games and only registering one assist before moving back to Finland with HIFK.

In 2008, Laakkonen returned to HPK for a second spell. In 2010 he returned to KalPa for a second spell for one season before moving back to HPK in 2011 for a third spell with the team. For the 2012–13 season, he had spells in Mestis with Lempäälän Kisa and in the SM-liiga with Ilves before returning to Sweden with IF Sundsvall Hockey of the Hockeyettan, the country's third-tier league.

Since then, Laakkonen has played in various leagues across Europe. He played in the Kazakhstan Hockey Championship for Arystan Temirtau and Kulager Petropavl, the Supreme Hockey League in Russia for Yuzhny Ural Orsk, the Belarusian Extraleague for HK Neman Grodno, the Ligue Magnus in France for Gothiques d'Amiens and most recently for GKS Katowice of the Polska Hokej Liga in Poland.

On 14 August 2019, Laakkonen moved to UK Elite Ice Hockey League side Coventry Blaze on a one-year deal.

Laakkonen had originally expressed an interest in staying in Coventry for a second season, however following the suspension of the 2020-21 Elite League season, the winger moved to Austria in October 2020 to sign for AlpsHL side EHC Lustenau.

After eight games with Lustenau, Laakkonen transferred to Norwegian side Narvik IK in December 2020.

In March 2021, Laakkonen returned to Coventry Blaze ahead of the 2021 Elite Series. In July 2021, Laakkonen was then confirmed as a returnee for the 2021-22 Elite League season.

In July 2022, Laakkonen swapped Coventry for fellow Elite League side Fife Flyers, signing a one-year deal for the 2022–23 season.

In October 2023, Laakkonen returned to his native Finland to sign for Mestis side FPS. Laakkonen finished the 2023–24 season in Hungary with UTE.

In May 2024, Laakkonen agreed terms on a return to the UK with NIHL side Peterborough Phantoms.

== Career statistics ==
			Regular season					Playoffs
Season	Team	League	GP	G	A	Pts	PIM	GP	G	A	Pts	PIM
2000–01	KalPa	Suomi-sarja	—	—	—	—	—	2	1	1	2	0
2001–02	KalPa	Mestis	5	1	0	1	27	—	—	—	—	—
2001–02	HPK	Liiga	43	3	20	23	18	8	0	2	2	4
2002–03	HPK	Liiga	55	19	20	39	22	9	3	2	5	4
2003–04	HPK	Liiga	37	8	21	29	18	4	2	0	2	2
2004–05	HPK	Liiga	49	9	23	32	32	9	0	1	1	6
2005–06	Timrå IK	SHL	6	0	1	1	0	—	—	—	—	—
2005–06	HIFK	Liiga	32	14	17	31	8	12	0	4	4	10
2006–07	HIFK	Liiga	56	13	23	36	36	5	0	3	3	0
2007–08	HIFK	Liiga	30	4	16	20	22	—	—	—	—	—
2008–09	HPK	Liiga	34	15	21	36	41	3	1	1	2	6
2009–10	HPK	Liiga	41	4	30	34	44	17	5	11	16	8
2010–11	KalPa	Liiga	54	7	19	26	50	7	1	2	3	2
2011–12	HPK	Liiga	53	10	19	29	30	—	—	—	—	—
2012–13	LeKi	Mestis	7	2	3	5	2	—	—	—	—	—
2012–13	Ilves	Liiga	9	0	0	0	4	—	—	—	—	—
2012–13	IF Sundsvall Hockey	Division 1	7	2	15	17	4	3	1	2	3	0
2013–14	IF Sundsvall Hockey	Division 1	10	3	9	12	16	2	2	2	4	2
2014–15	Arystan Temirtau	Kazakhstan	10	8	10	18	4	—	—	—	—	—
2014–15	Yuzhny Ural Orsk	VHL	22	5	7	12	11	—	—	—	—	—
2015–16	Kulager Petropavl	Kazakhstan	35	14	23	37	32	—	—	—	—	—
2015–16	Neman Grodno	Belarus	9	1	5	6	6	12	2	7	9	4
2016–17	Neman Grodno	Belarus	41	13	34	47	18	11	3	5	8	4
2017–18	Gothiques d'Amiens	Ligue Magnus	40	10	25	35	24	12	0	7	7	16
2018–19	GKS Katowice	Polska Hokej Liga	38	15	33	48	4	16	4	5	9	14
2019–20	Coventry Blaze	EIHL	43	9	40	49	16	—	—	—	—	—
2020–21	EHC Lustenau	AlpsHL	8	2	7	9	0	—	—	—	—	—
2020–21	Narvik IK	Eliteserien	4	1	1	2	4	—	—	—	—	—
2020–21	Coventry Blaze	Elite Series	14	1	7	8	12	—	—	—	—	—
2021–22	Coventry Blaze	EIHL	51	13	39	52	54	1	0	0	0	0
2022–23	Fife Flyers	EIHL	53	12	22	34	22	—	—	—	—	—
2023–24	FPS	Mestis	16	4	13	17	18	—	—	—	—	—
2023–24	UTE	Erste Liga	23	2	13	15	14	4	0	2	2	0
Liiga totals			493	106	229	335	325	74	12	26	38	42
