= Lukas Martinka =

Slovak ice hockey player

Lukáš Martinka
- Born: 28 October 1986 (age 39) Trenčín, Czechoslovakia
- Height: 1.84 m (6 ft 0 in)
- Weight: 94 kg (207 lb; 14 st 11 lb)
- Position: Defence
- Shot: Left
- Played for: HC Slavia Praha; MHk 32 Liptovský Mikuláš; Dunaújvárosi Acélbikák; Arystan Temirtau; MsHK Žilina; Kulager Petropavl; GKS Katowice; KH Zagłębie Sosnowiec
- Playing career: 2006–2019

Lukáš Martinka (born 28 October 1986 in Trenčín) is a Slovak former professional ice hockey player.

Martinka played five games for HC Slavia Praha of the Czech Extraliga during the 2008–09 season. He also played in the Tisport liga for MHk 32 Liptovský Mikuláš and MsHK Žilina and the Kazakhstan Hockey Championship for Arystan Temirtau and Kulager Petropavl.
