= Marko Virtala =

Finnish ice hockey player

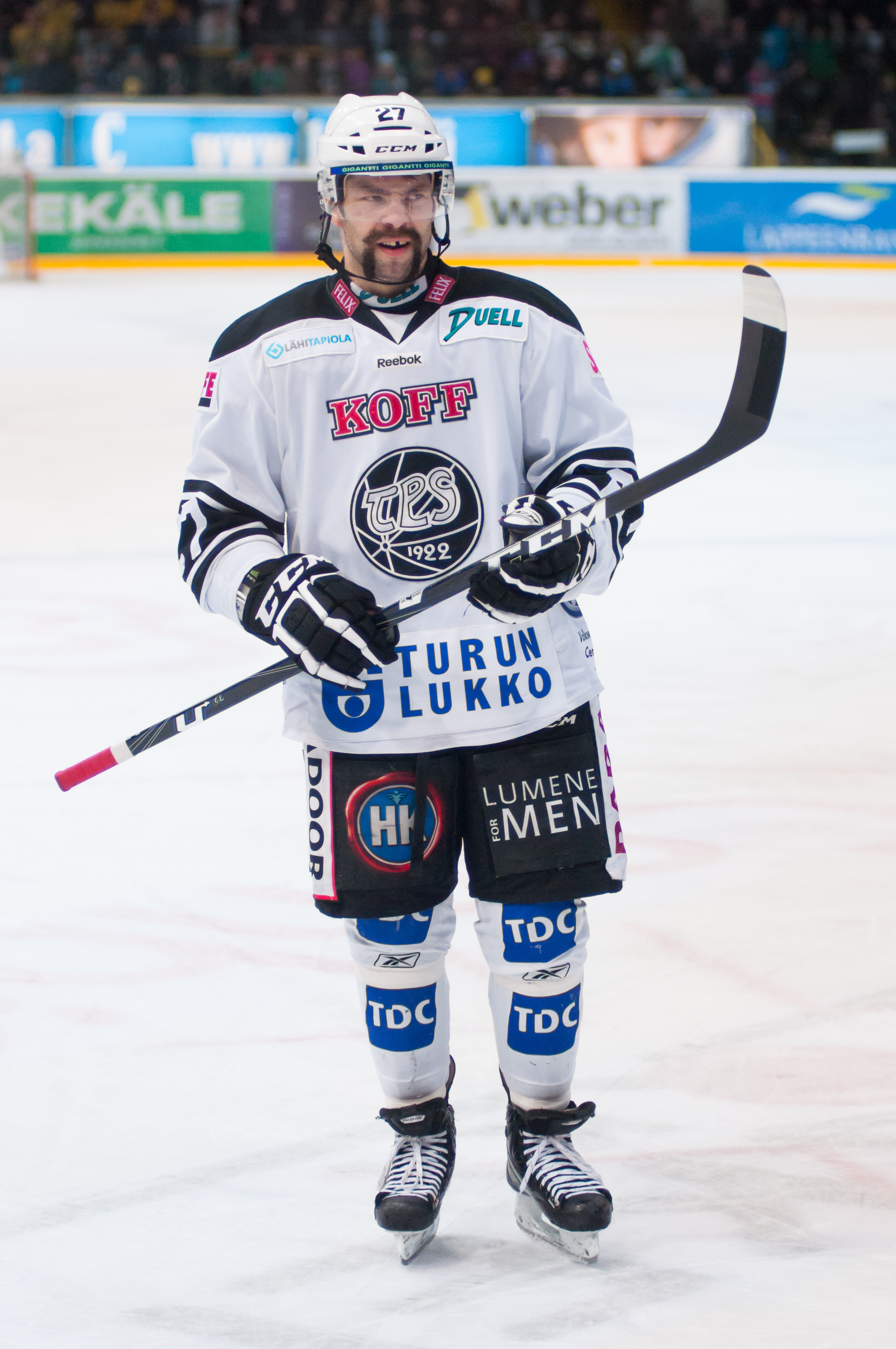
- Born: April 15, 1985 (age 40) Uusikaupunki, Finland
- Height: 5 ft 9 in (175 cm)
- Weight: 165 lb (75 kg; 11 st 11 lb)
- Position: Forward
- Shot: Left
- Liiga team Former teams: HC TPS; Lukko
- NHL draft: Undrafted
- Playing career: 2006–2025

Marko Virtala (born April 15, 1985) is a Finnish ice hockey player. He is currently playing with HC TPS in the Finnish Liiga.

Virtala made his SM-liiga debut playing with Lukko during the 2007–08 season.

== Career statistics ==
			Regular season					Playoffs
Season	Team	League	GP	G	A	Pts	PIM	GP	G	A	Pts	PIM
2000–01	Lukko U16	U16 SM-sarja	14	7	5	12	10	2	0	0	0	0
2001–02	Lukko U18	U18 SM-sarja	17	5	3	8	14	—	—	—	—	—
2002–03	Lukko U18	U18 SM-sarja	25	14	9	23	46	—	—	—	—	—
2002–03	Lukko U20	U20 SM-liiga	6	1	2	3	0	—	—	—	—	—
2003–04	Lukko U20	U20 SM-liiga	41	6	5	11	6	—	—	—	—	—
2004–05	Lukko U20	U20 SM-liiga	38	15	15	30	20	—	—	—	—	—
2005–06	Lukko U20	U20 SM-liiga	38	15	19	34	6	9	2	3	5	0
2006–07	Hokki	Mestis	32	6	10	16	0	—	—	—	—	—
2007–08	Hokki	Mestis	42	16	30	46	10	12	2	10	12	2
2007–08	Lukko	SM-liiga	1	0	0	0	0	—	—	—	—	—
2008–09	Lukko	SM-liiga	47	4	3	7	6	—	—	—	—	—
2009–10	SM-liiga	SM-liiga	24	1	6	7	35	—	—	—	—	—
2009–10	HC TPS	SM-liiga	18	2	2	4	4	15	3	7	10	2
2010–11	HC TPS	SM-liiga	56	3	13	16	16	—	—	—	—	—
2011–12	HC TPS	SM-liiga	52	6	10	16	22	2	0	0	0	2
2012–13	HC TPS	SM-liiga	43	7	6	13	12	—	—	—	—	—
2013–14	HC TPS	Liiga	59	8	11	19	4	—	—	—	—	—
2014–15	HC TPS	Liiga	54	5	5	10	14	—	—	—	—	—
2015–16	Arlan Kokshetau	Kazakhstan	53	23	24	47	22	17	3	6	9	6
2016–17	Gentofte Stars	Denmark	43	16	14	30	26	16	5	5	10	6
2017–18	Gentofte Stars	Denmark	49	15	31	46	38	3	2	1	3	4
2018–19	HC Pustertal Wölfe	AlpsHL	25	5	25	30	6	16	3	4	7	6
2019–20	Rødovre Mighty Bulls	Denmark	44	15	17	32	18	—	—	—	—	—
2020–21	SV Kaltern	Italy2	13	5	18	23	8	14	5	4	9	18
2020–21	HC Gherdëina	AlpsHL	5	1	2	3	4	—	—	—	—	—
2021–22	Brest Albatros Hockey	France2	25	11	25	36	5	12	4	10	14	13
2022–23	SV Kaltern	Italy2	24	14	22	36	18	14	6	9	15	8
2023–24	SV Kaltern	Italy2	27	13	28	41	12	8	8	12	20	0
2024–25	SV Kaltern	Italy2	25	11	24	35	14	13	3	14	17	6
Liiga totals			354	36	56	92	113	24	5	8	13	12
Denmark totals			136	46	62	108	82	19	7	6	13	10
Mestis totals			74	22	40	62	10	24	9	13	22	4
Italy2 totals			89	43	92	135	52	49	22	39	61	32
Kazakhstan totals			53	23	24	47	22	17	3	6	9	6
