= Tony Vidgren =

Finnish ice hockey player

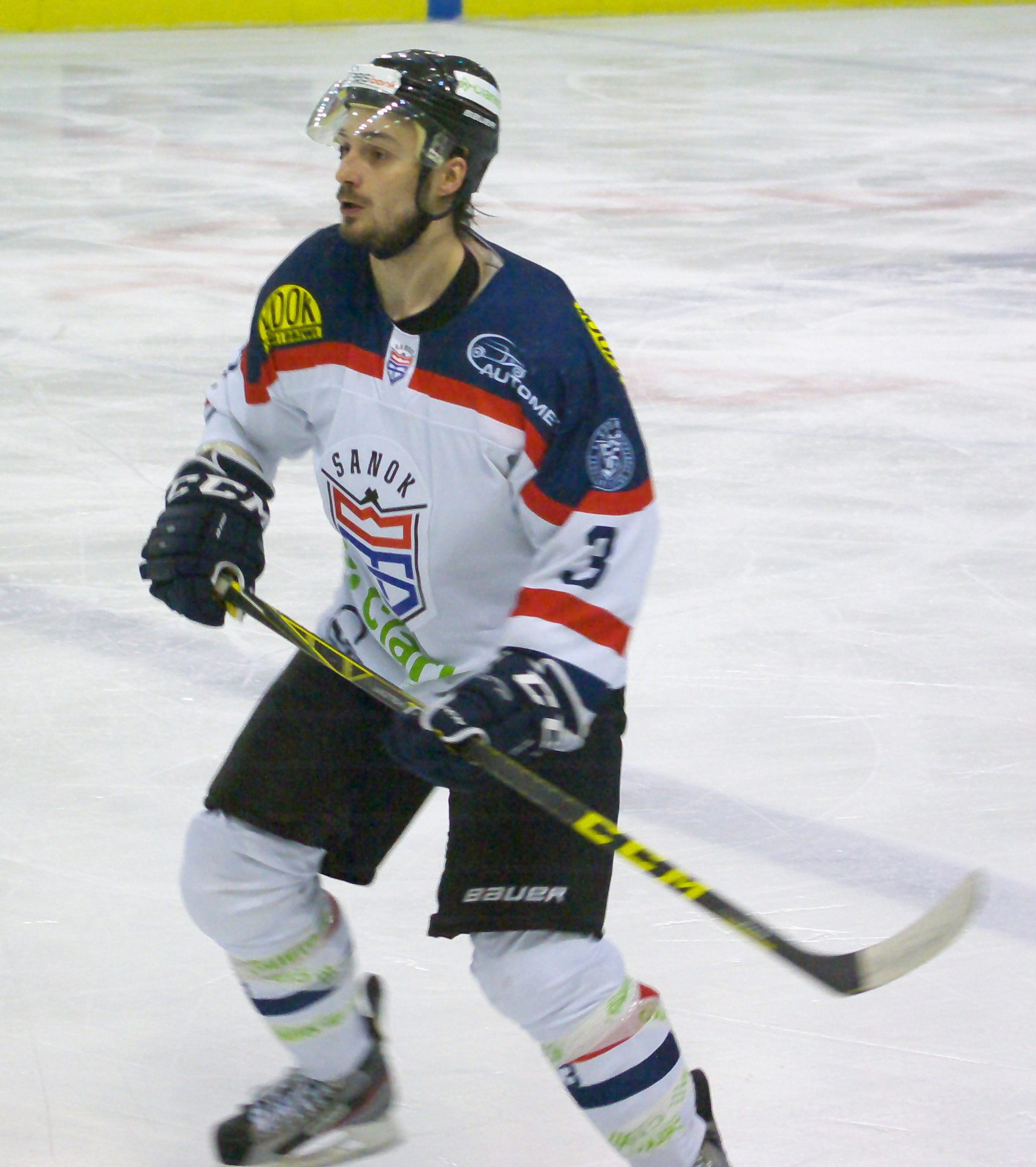
- Born: February 13, 1990 (age 35); Turku, Finland
- Height: 6 ft 3 in (191 cm)
- Weight: 209 lb (95 kg; 14 st 13 lb)
- Position: Defence
- Shot: Left
- Belarusian Extraleague team Former teams: Shakhtyor Soligorsk; TPS Turku; Lukko; Peliitat Heinola; TUTO Hockey; HC Fassa; Kulager Petropavl; STS Sanok
- Playing career: 2008–2018

Tony Vidgren is a Finnish ice hockey player who currently plays professionally for Shakhtyor Soligorsk of the Belarusian Extraleague, the top level of ice hockey in Belarus.

He began his career playing in the youth squads of TPS Turku. He has played professional hockey in Finland, Italy, Kazakhstan, and Poland. Most notably, he played for Lukko for three seasons at both the junior and senior level.
