= Maxim Krivonozhkin =

Russian ice hockey player

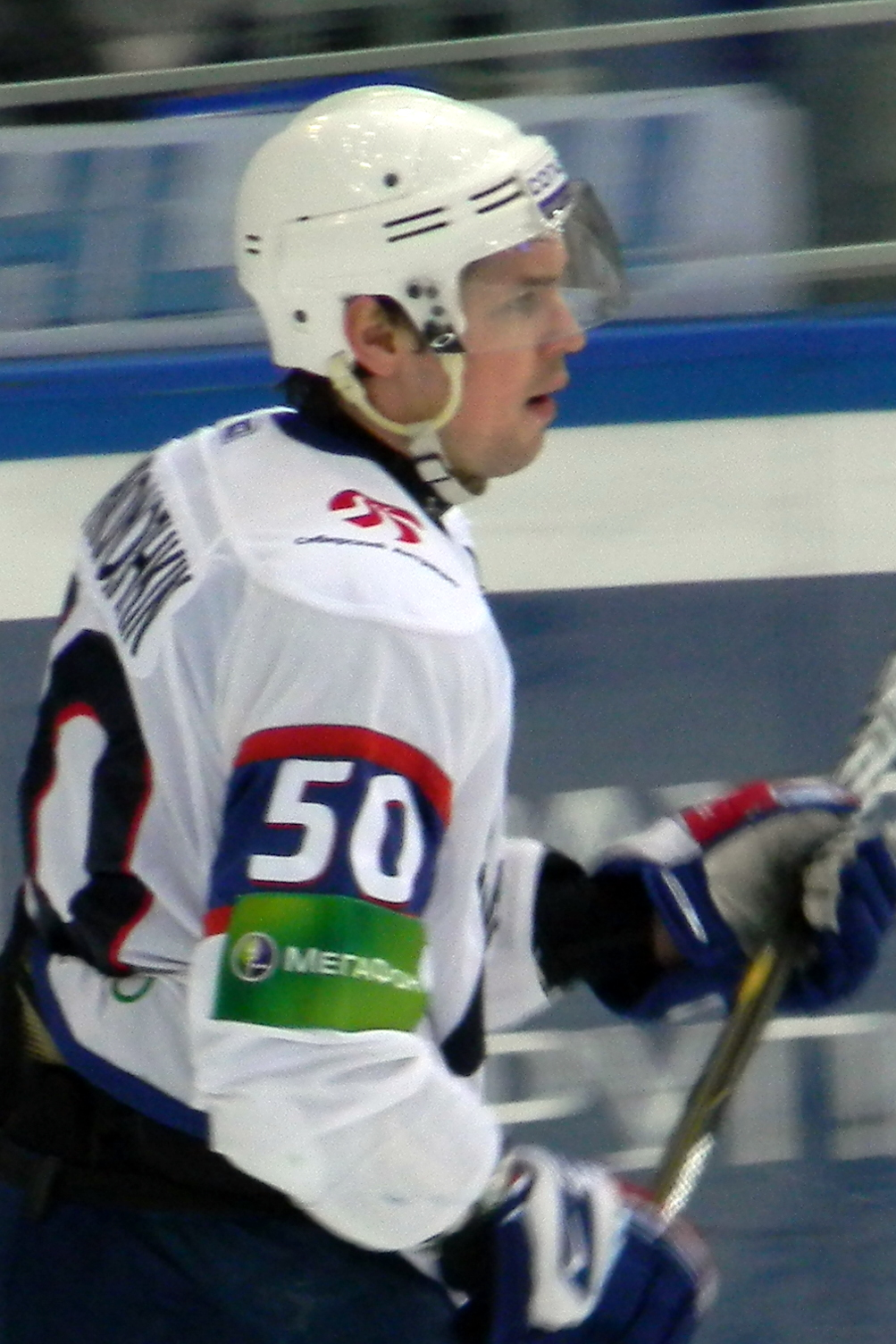
- Born: 18 February 1984 (age 42) Saratov, Russian SFSR, USSR
- Height: 6 ft 1 in (185 cm)
- Weight: 190 lb (86 kg; 13 st 8 lb)
- Position: Forward
- Shot: Left
- Played for: Traktor Chelyabinsk; HC Lada Togliatti; CSK VVS Samara; Amur Khabarovsk; HC Sibir Novosibirsk; Yugra Khanty-Mansiysk; Buran Voronezh; Toros Neftekamsk; Yertis Pavlodar; Beibarys Atyrau; Kristall Saratov
- Playing career: 2002–2017

Maxim Krivonozhkin (born 18 February 1984) is a Russian former professional ice hockey forward who most recently played for HC Sibir Novosibirsk of the Kontinental Hockey League (KHL). He is currently the assistant coach for Neftekhimik Nizhnekamsk of the Kontinental Hockey League (KHL).

== Career statistics ==
			Regular season					Playoffs
Season	Team	League	GP	G	A	Pts	PIM	GP	G	A	Pts	PIM
1999–00	Lada Togliatti-2	Russia3	10	0	0	0	0	—	—	—	—	—
2000–01	Lada Togliatti-2	Russia3	—	—	—	—	—	—	—	—	—	—
2001–02	Lada Togliatti-2	Russia3	—	—	—	—	—	—	—	—	—	—
2002–03	Traktor Chelyabinsk	Russia2	30	7	5	12	46	—	—	—	—	—
2003–04	Lada Togliatti	Russia	9	0	2	2	4	—	—	—	—	—
2003–04	Lada Togliatti-2	Russia3	24	11	6	17	26	—	—	—	—	—
2004–05	Lada Togliatti-2	Russia3	14	2	0	2	4	—	—	—	—	—
2004–05	CSK VVS Samara	Russia2	17	1	5	6	8	—	—	—	—	—
2005–06	Traktor Chelyabinsk	Russia2	36	7	11	18	40	6	1	0	1	8
2006–07	Traktor Chelyabinsk	Russia	25	1	0	1	24	—	—	—	—	—
2007–08	Lada Togliatti	Russia	55	5	7	12	75	4	1	0	1	4
2008–09	Lada Togliatti	KHL	8	0	0	0	0	—	—	—	—	—
2008–09	Amur Khabarovsk	KHL	41	8	6	14	34	—	—	—	—	—
2009–10	Amur Khabarovsk	KHL	52	5	11	16	64	—	—	—	—	—
2010–11	Sibir Novosibirsk	KHL	54	4	10	14	56	4	0	0	0	4
2011–12	Sibir Novosibirsk	KHL	23	6	1	7	28	—	—	—	—	—
2012–13	Sibir Novosibirsk	KHL	51	10	10	20	38	7	0	2	2	12
2013–14	Yugra Khanty-Mansiysk	KHL	7	1	0	1	2	—	—	—	—	—
2013–14	Lada Togliatti	VHL	6	1	2	3	8	—	—	—	—	—
2013–14	Sibir Novosibirsk	KHL	7	1	0	1	4	—	—	—	—	—
2013–14	Buran Voronezh	VHL	12	2	4	6	16	10	2	3	5	8
2014–15	Toros Neftekamsk	VHL	21	6	4	10	40	20	3	1	4	38
2015–16	Ertis Pavlodar	Kazakhstan	23	2	8	10	87	—	—	—	—	—
2015–16	Beibarys Atyrau	Kazakhstan	23	4	11	15	8	14	1	6	7	2
2016–17	Kristall Saratov	VHL	21	0	6	6	6	—	—	—	—	—
KHL totals			243	35	38	73	226	11	0	2	2	16
