= John Murray (ice hockey, born 1987) =

American-Polish ice hockey player

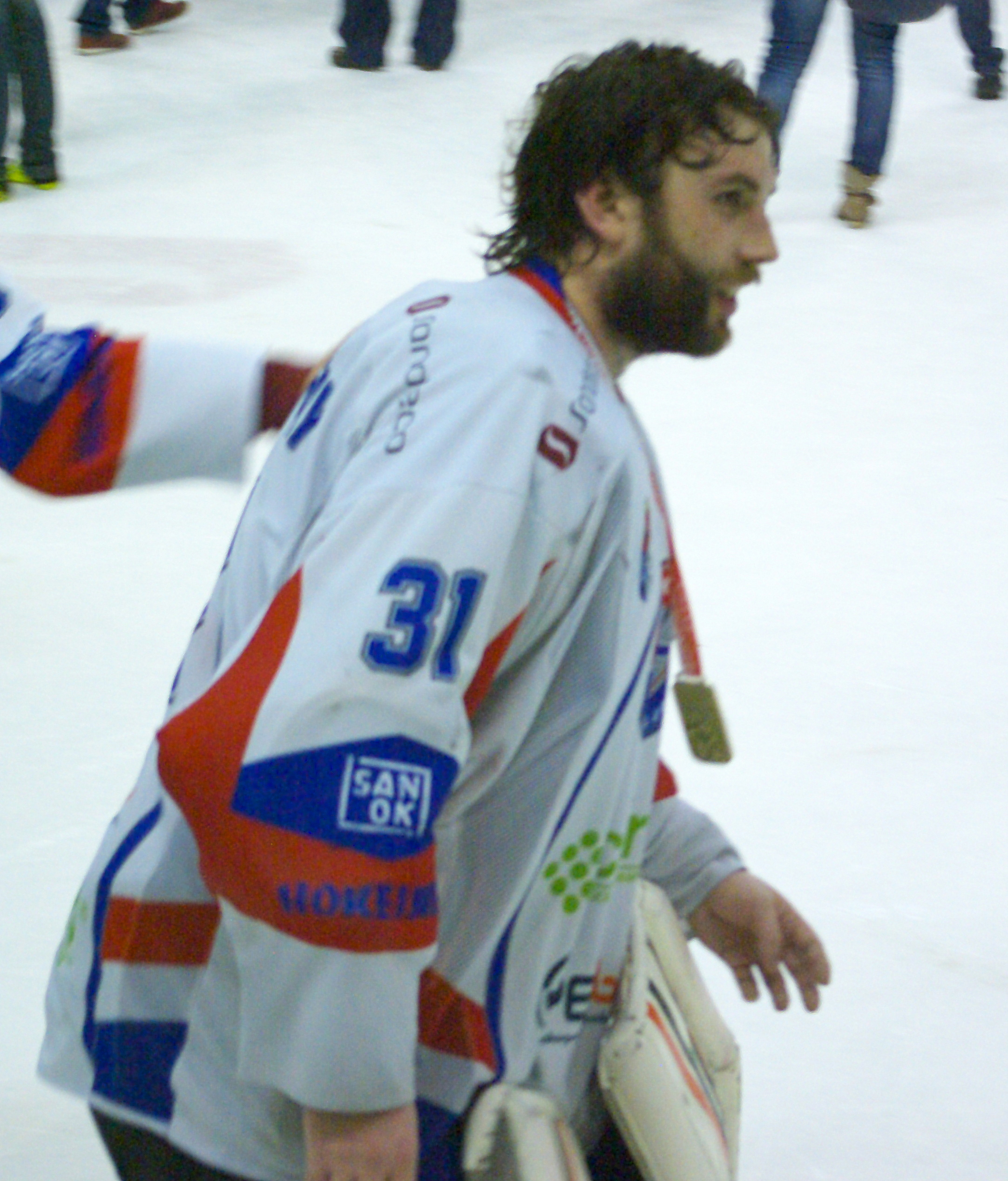
- Born: July 4, 1987 (age 39) Lancaster, Pennsylvania, U.S.
- Height: 6 ft 0 in (183 cm)
- Weight: 197 lb (89 kg; 14 st 1 lb)
- Position: Goaltender
- Catches: Left
- PHL team Former teams: GKS Katowice; Reading Royals; Ontario Reign; Syracuse Crunch; Mississippi Sea Wolves; Victoria Salmon Kings; Johnstown Chiefs; HK Partizan; Rio Grande Valley Killer Bees; Quad City Mallards; KH Sanok; Orlik Opole; Kulager Petropavl
- National team: Poland
- Playing career: 2008–present

John Murray (born July 4, 1987) is a retired American-Polish professional ice hockey goaltender most recently playing for GKS Katowice in the Polska Hokej Liga.

== Playing career ==
=== Professional ===
After the Kingston Frontenacs missed the playoffs in 2008, Murray was signed by the ECHL's Reading Royals. In his first ECHL start, against the Elmira Jackals at First Arena in Elmira, New York, he recorded a 38-save shutout en route to being named the first star of the game. In the summer of 2008, Murray was signed to the ECHL's newest franchise, the Ontario Reign. Murray did well in Ontario, earning a berth at the 2009 ECHL All-Star Game in Reading. After Jeff Zatkoff came back from an injury, however, Murray found himself traded to the now-defunct Mississippi Sea Wolves in February 2009. He played in only two games for Mississippi, both of them losses. During the period of time between the ECHL All-Star Game and his trade, Murray was recalled by the Syracuse Crunch while Dan LaCosta was recalled by the Columbus Blue Jackets.

In the summer of 2009, Murray was signed to a two-way contract between the Manitoba Moose of the AHL and the Victoria Salmon Kings of the ECHL. After starting the 2009/10 season with the Salmon Kings, his job was taken away when the Calgary Flames assigned both David Shantz and Matt Keetley to the team. Murray was claimed by the Johnstown Chiefs, an ECHL team in his home state of Pennsylvania. With the Chiefs having folded, Murray was to return to the Salmon Kings in 2010/11; instead, he opted to sign with HK Partizan as a free agent. As a Partizan Murray had an outstanding season. He posted a 1.97 GAA (goals against average) and a 0.933 save percentage in the regular season and led his team to victory over the HK Olimpija to become the 2010–2011 Slohokej League Champions and later Serbian Hockey League Champions. In the Serbian Hockey League Championships against the KHK Crvena Zvezda Murray in two games posted a 0.951 save percentage and a 1.5 GAA.
