= Mikhail Rakhmanov =

Kazakhstani ice hockey player

- Born: May 27, 1992 (age 34) Oskemen, Kazakhstan
- Height: 5 ft 9 in (175 cm)
- Weight: 165 lb (75 kg; 11 st 11 lb)
- Position: Right wing
- Shoots: Left
- KAZ team Former teams: Torpedo Ust-Kamenogorsk; Barys Astana
- National team: Kazakhstan
- Playing career: 2008–present

Mikhail Alexeyevich Rakhmanov (Russian: Михаил Александрович Рахманов; born May 27, 1992) is a Kazakhstani professional ice hockey winger who currently plays for Torpedo Ust-Kamenogorsk in the Kazakhstan Hockey Championship (KAZ). He has formerly played throughout his career with Barys Astana of the Kontinental Hockey League (KHL).

== Career statistics ==
=== Regular season and playoffs ===
			Regular season					Playoffs
Season	Team	League	GP	G	A	Pts	PIM	GP	G	A	Pts	PIM
2011–12	Snezhnye Barsy Astana	MHL	60	16	15	31	24	—	—	—	—	—
2012–13	Snezhnye Barsy Astana	MHL	15	3	7	10	10	—	—	—	—	—
2012–13	Barys Astana	KHL	23	2	5	7	4	5	0	0	0	2
2013–14	Barys Astana	KHL	54	8	5	13	10	10	1	0	1	0
2014–15	Barys Astana	KHL	32	2	1	3	10	3	0	0	0	0
KHL totals			108	12	11	23	24	18	1	0	1	2

=== International ===
Year	Team	Event	GP	G	A	Pts	PIM
2009	Kazakhstan	U18-I	5	2	2	4	2
2010	Kazakhstan	U18-I	5	1	0	1	6
2010	Kazakhstan	WJC-I	5	1	1	2	2
2011	Kazakhstan	WJC-I	5	1	1	2	4
2012	Kazakhstan	WJC-I	5	1	2	3	0
2013	Kazakhstan	OGQ	3	0	0	0	0
2014	Kazakhstan	WC	5	0	0	0	0
2020	Kazakhstan	OGQ	1	0	0	0	0
2022	Kazakhstan	WC	7	0	1	1	0
2023	Kazakhstan	WC	7	0	0	0	0
2024	Kazakhstan	WC	7	0	0	0	2
2024	Kazakhstan	DNQ	1	0	0	0	0
Junior totals			20	5	4	9	16
Senior totals			31	0	1	1	2
