= Michal Grman =

Slovak ice hockey defenceman

- Born: July 30, 1982 (age 43) Liptovský Mikuláš, Czechoslovakia
- Height: 6 ft 2 in (188 cm)
- Weight: 198 lb (90 kg; 14 st 2 lb)
- Position: Defence
- Shot: Left
- Played for: MHk 32 Liptovský Mikuláš; HK Nitra; MsHK Žilina; HC Košice; HC '05 Banská Bystrica; HC Karlovy Vary
- National team: Slovakia
- Playing career: 2001–2018

Michal Grman (born July 30, 1982) is a Slovak former professional ice hockey defenceman.

== Career ==
Grman played 39 games in the Czech Extraliga for HC Karlovy Vary until he was released by the team on November 22, 2013. He also played in the Tipsport Liga for MHk 32 Liptovský Mikuláš, HK Nitra, MsHK Žilina, HC Kosice and HC '05 Banská Bystrica.

== Career statistics ==
			Regular season					Playoffs
Season	Team	League	GP	G	A	Pts	PIM	GP	G	A	Pts	PIM
1996–97	HK 32 Liptovsky Mikulas U18	Slovak U18	43	3	2	5	24	—	—	—	—	—
1997–98	HK 32 Liptovsky Mikulas U18	Slovak U18	39	13	7	20	40	—	—	—	—	—
1998–99	HK 32 Liptovsky Mikulas U20	Slovak U20	2	0	0	0	0	—	—	—	—	—
1999–00	HK 32 Liptovsky Mikulas U20	Slovak U20	30	1	3	4	10	—	—	—	—	—
2000–01	HK 32 Liptovsky Mikulas U20	Slovak U20	34	6	5	11	14	—	—	—	—	—
2000–01	HK 32 Liptovsky Mikulas	Slovak	7	1	0	1	0	—	—	—	—	—
2001–02	HK 32 Liptovsky Mikulas	Slovak	5	0	0	0	2	—	—	—	—	—
2002–03	HK 32 Liptovsky Mikulas	Slovak	17	1	1	2	6	—	—	—	—	—
2002–03	HC '05 Banská Bystrica	Slovak2	21	3	6	9	32	—	—	—	—	—
2003–04	HK Nitra	Slovak	10	0	1	1	10	—	—	—	—	—
2003–04	HK 32 Liptovsky Mikulas	Slovak	16	0	0	0	2	—	—	—	—	—
2003–04	HC RT TORAX Poruba 2011	Czech3	1	1	1	2	2	11	2	0	2	12
2004–05	HC RT TORAX Poruba 2011	Czech2	42	4	9	13	26	1	0	0	0	2
2005–06	HK Jestřábi Prostějov	Czech2	12	0	0	0	6	—	—	—	—	—
2005–06	HK 32 Liptovsky Mikulas	Slovak	20	1	1	2	4	—	—	—	—	—
2006–07	HK 32 Liptovsky Mikulas	Slovak	54	6	19	25	87	—	—	—	—	—
2007–08	MsHK Zilina	Slovak	7	0	2	2	4	4	0	1	1	2
2007–08	HK 32 Liptovsky Mikulas	Slovak	45	6	18	24	26	—	—	—	—	—
2008–09	HC Košice	Slovak	18	2	5	7	4	18	2	3	5	10
2008–09	HK 32 Liptovsky Mikulas	Slovak	27	3	2	5	4	—	—	—	—	—
2009–10	HC Košice	Slovak	44	0	14	14	22	16	0	9	9	6
2009–10	HC 46 Bardejov	Slovak2	1	2	0	2	0	—	—	—	—	—
2010–11	HC Košice	Slovak	54	6	14	20	26	14	2	4	6	8
2011–12	HC Košice	Slovak	20	1	5	6	12	—	—	—	—	—
2011–12	HC Banska Bystrica	Slovak	31	8	11	19	10	5	0	2	2	2
2012–13	HC Banska Bystrica	Slovak	20	4	7	11	10	—	—	—	—	—
2012–13	HC Energie Karlovy Vary	Czech	29	1	6	7	14	—	—	—	—	—
2013–14	HC Energie Karlovy Vary	Czech	10	0	1	1	4	—	—	—	—	—
2013–14	HC Baník Sokolov	Czech3	4	1	1	2	2	—	—	—	—	—
2013–14	Ertis-Pavlodar	Kazakhstan	16	0	4	4	10	13	4	4	8	2
2014–15	Ertis-Pavlodar	Kazakhstan	35	5	16	21	12	—	—	—	—	—
2014–15	MsHK Zilina	Slovak	7	0	0	0	2	—	—	—	—	—
2015–16	MsHK Zilina	Slovak	21	1	3	4	8	—	—	—	—	—
2015–16	Cracovia Krakow	Poland	12	0	3	3	4	—	—	—	—	—
2015–16	Ertis-Pavlodar	Kazakhstan	6	0	0	0	0	12	4	3	7	8
2017–18	HK 32 Liptovsky Mikulas B	Slovak3	4	0	6	6	0	—	—	—	—	—
2018–19	HK 32 Liptovsky Mikulas B	Slovak3	1	0	0	0	2	—	—	—	—	—
Slovak totals			423	40	103	143	239	62	4	25	29	30
