= 2011 World Junior Ice Hockey Championships – Division I =

2011 IIHF U20 World Championship Division I

Tournament details
- Host countries: Belarus; Slovenia
- Venues: 2 (in 2 host cities)
- Dates: 13–19 December 2010; 12–18 December 2010
- Teams: 12

The 2011 World Junior Ice Hockey Championship Division I was a pair of international ice hockey tournaments organized by the International Ice Hockey Federation. Six teams played in each of the two groups. In addition to the usual promotion and relegation, the format (following this year) changed from two parallel tournaments, to two tiered tournaments. This means that the teams who finished 2nd and 3rd will be grouped together with the two relegated teams from the top division, and the teams who finished 4th and 5th will be grouped with the two promoted teams from Division II.

== Group A ==
The Group A tournament was played in Babruysk, Belarus, from 13 to 19 December 2010.

=== Participating teams ===
Team	Qualification
Latvia	Placed 9th in Top Division last year and were relegated.
Belarus	Hosts; placed 2nd in Division I (Group B) last year.
Italy	Placed 3rd in Division I (Group B) last year.
Ukraine	Placed 4th in Division I (Group A) last year.
Japan	Placed 5th in Division I (Group A) last year.
Great Britain	Placed 1st in Division II (Group A) last year and were promoted.

=== Final standings ===
Pos	Team	Pld	W	OTW	OTL	L	GF	GA	GD	Pts	Promotion, qualification or relegation
1	Latvia	5	5	0	0	0	21	3	+18	15	Promoted to the 2012 Top Division
2	Belarus (H)	5	4	0	0	1	18	9	+9	12	Qualified for the 2012 Division I A
3	Great Britain	5	3	0	0	2	12	10	+2	9	Qualified for the 2012 Division I A
4	Italy	5	2	0	0	3	13	8	+5	6	Qualified for the 2012 Division I B
5	Japan	5	1	0	0	4	9	15	−6	3	Qualified for the 2012 Division I B
6	Ukraine	5	0	0	0	5	4	32	−28	0	Relegated to the 2012 Division II A

Source: IIHF
(H) Host

=== Match results ===
All times are local (Eastern European Time – UTC+2).

13 December 2010; 12:00	Japan	0–6 (0–0, 0–3, 0–3)	Italy	Babruysk Arena, Babruysk

Game reference

13 December 2010; 15:30	Great Britain	1–6 (0–1, 0–4, 1–1)	Latvia	Babruysk Arena, Babruysk

Game reference

13 December 2010; 19:00	Ukraine	2–7 (0–1, 1–2, 1–4)	Belarus	Babruysk Arena, Babruysk

Game reference

14 December 2010; 12:00	Italy	0–2 (0–0, 0–2, 0–0)	Great Britain	Babruysk Arena, Babruysk

Game reference

14 December 2010; 15:30	Latvia	9–0 (3–0, 2–0, 4–0)	Ukraine	Babruysk Arena, Babruysk

Game reference

14 December 2010; 19:00	Belarus	4–1 (1–0, 0–1, 3–0)	Japan	Babruysk Arena, Babruysk

Game reference

16 December 2010; 12:00	Great Britain	5–1 (0–0, 2–1, 3–0)	Ukraine	Babruysk Arena, Babruysk

Game reference

16 December 2010; 15:30	Latvia	2–1 (1–1, 1–0, 0–0)	Japan	Babruysk Arena, Babruysk

Game reference

16 December 2010; 19:00	Belarus	4–2 (0–0, 2–1, 2–1)	Italy	Babruysk Arena, Babruysk

Game reference

17 December 2010; 12:00	Ukraine	0–6 (0–3, 0–1, 0–2)	Japan	Babruysk Arena, Babruysk

Game reference

17 December 2010; 15:30	Italy	0–1 (0–0, 0–1, 0–0)	Latvia	Babruysk Arena, Babruysk

Game reference

17 December 2010; 19:00	Belarus	2–1 (0–1, 0–0, 2–0)	Great Britain	Babruysk Arena, Babruysk

Game reference

19 December 2010; 12:00	Japan	1–3 (0–0, 0–2, 1–1)	Great Britain	Babruysk Arena, Babruysk

Game reference

19 December 2010; 15:30	Italy	5–1 (1–0, 4–0, 0–1)	Ukraine	Babruysk Arena, Babruysk

Game reference

19 December 2010; 19:00	Latvia	3–1 (1–1, 1–0, 1–0)	Belarus	Babruysk Arena, Babruysk

Game reference

=== Statistics ===
==== Top 10 scorers ====
Pos	Player	GP	G	A	Pts	+/-	PIM
1	Nikolai Suslo (Belarus)	5	5	3	8	+5	4
2	Juris Upītis (Latvia)	5	3	5	8	+6	0
3	Zemgus Girgensons (Latvia)	5	4	3	7	+6	8
4	Elvijs Biezais (Latvia)	5	3	3	6	+4	6
5	Mikhail Khoromando (Belarus)	5	1	5	6	–1	4
6	Jack Prince (United Kingdom)	5	5	0	5	+3	2
7	Ruslam Azimov (Belarus)	5	2	3	5	+2	4
8	Robert Farmer (United Kingdom)	5	1	4	5	+1	2
8	Roman Malinovski (Belarus)	5	1	4	5	+4	2
10	Enrico Miglioranzi (Italy)	5	0	5	5	–1	0

source: IIHF.com

==== Goaltending leaders ====
(minimum 40% team's total ice time)

Pos	Player	MINS	GA	Sv%	GAA	SO
1	Jānis Kalniņš (Latvia)	240:00	2	97.50	0.50	2
2	Massimo Quagliato (Italy)	239:29	4	96.26	1.00	1
3	Ben Bowns (United Kingdom)	300:00	10	95.19	2.00	1
4	Alexander Borodulya (Belarus)	298:35	8	91.75	1.61	0
5	Ren Yamaguchi (Japan)	240:00	11	90.43	2.75	1

source: IIHF.com

==== IIHF Directorate awards ====
- Goaltender: (United Kingdom) Ben Bowns
- Defenceman: (Latvia) Ralfs Freibergs
- Forward: (Belarus) Nikolai Suslo

== Group B ==
The Group B tournament was played in Bled, Slovenia, from 12 to 18 December 2010.

=== Participating teams ===
Team	Qualification
Austria	Placed 10th in Top Division last year and were relegated.
Denmark	Placed 2nd in Division I (Group A) last year.
Slovenia	Hosts; placed 3rd in Division I (Group A) last year.
Kazakhstan	Placed 4th in Division I (Group B) last year.
Croatia	Placed 5th in Division I (Group B) last year.
Lithuania	Placed 1st in Division II (Group B) last year and were promoted.

=== Final standings ===
Pos	Team	Pld	W	OTW	OTL	L	GF	GA	GD	Pts	Promotion, qualification or relegation
1	Denmark	5	4	0	0	1	35	14	+21	12	Promoted to the 2012 Top Division
2	Slovenia (H)	5	4	0	0	1	31	14	+17	12	Qualified for the 2012 Division I A
3	Austria	5	3	1	0	1	24	13	+11	11	Qualified for the 2012 Division I A
4	Kazakhstan	5	2	0	0	3	19	24	−5	6	Qualified for the 2012 Division I B
5	Croatia	5	1	0	1	3	16	35	−19	4	Qualified for the 2012 Division I B
6	Lithuania	5	0	0	0	5	10	35	−25	0	Relegated to the 2012 Division II A

Source: IIHF
(H) Host

=== Match results ===
All times are local (Central European Time – UTC+1).

12 December 2010; 13:00	Kazakhstan	1–7 (0–2, 1–1, 0–4)	Denmark	Ice Skating Arena, Bled

Game reference

12 December 2010; 16:30	Lithuania	0–5 (0–1, 0–3, 0–1)	Austria	Ice Skating Arena, Bled

Game reference

12 December 2010; 20:00	Croatia	3–11 (0–4, 2–5, 1–2)	Slovenia	Ice Skating Arena, Bled

Game reference

13 December 2010; 15:00	Austria	5–2 (0–1, 4–1, 1–0)	Kazakhstan	Ice Skating Arena, Bled

Game reference

13 December 2010; 18:30	Denmark	12–3 (4–1, 5–1, 3–1)	Croatia	Ice Skating Arena, Bled

Game reference

14 December 2010; 18:30	Slovenia	10–3 (6–1, 2–1, 2–1)	Lithuania	Ice Skating Arena, Bled

Game reference

15 December 2010; 13:00	Austria	4–3 (OT) (0–0, 2–1, 1–2) (1–0)	Croatia	Ice Skating Arena, Bled

Game reference

15 December 2010; 16:30	Lithuania	4–6 (2–0, 1–3, 1–3)	Kazakhstan	Ice Skating Arena, Bled

Game reference

15 December 2010; 20:00	Denmark	2–1 (1–1, 1–0, 0–0)	Slovenia	Ice Skating Arena, Bled

Game reference

16 December 2010; 18:30	Kazakhstan	6–2 (2–0, 2–2, 2–0)	Croatia	Ice Skating Arena, Bled

Game reference

17 December 2010; 15:00	Denmark	9–1 (6–1, 0–0, 3–0)	Lithuania	Ice Skating Arena, Bled

Game reference

17 December 2010; 18:30	Slovenia	3–2 (1–0, 0–0, 2–2)	Austria	Ice Skating Arena, Bled

Game reference

18 December 2010; 12:00	Croatia	5–2 (0–1, 1–1, 4–0)	Lithuania	Ice Skating Arena, Bled

Game reference

18 December 2010; 15:30	Austria	8–5 (2–2, 5–2, 1–1)	Denmark	Ice Skating Arena, Bled

Game reference

18 December 2010; 19:00	Slovenia	6–4 (0–2, 1–2, 5–0)	Kazakhstan	Ice Skating Arena, Bled

Game reference

=== Statistics ===
==== Top 10 scorers ====
Pos	Player	GP	G	A	Pts	+/-	PIM
1	(Denmark) Nicolai Meyer	5	8	4	12	+5	0
2	(Slovenia) Eric Pance	5	7	5	12	+9	2
3	(Austria) Kevin Puschnik	5	6	5	11	+7	10
4	(Austria) Konstantin Komarek	5	5	5	10	+3	0
5	(Croatia) Borna Rendulić	5	4	5	9	–1	2
6	(Denmark) Patrick Russell	5	7	1	8	+8	2
7	(Kazakhstan) Anton Petrov	5	5	3	8	+2	6
8	(Slovenia) Gal Koren	5	3	5	8	+8	10
9	(Croatia) Mislav Blagus	5	2	6	8	0	0
10	(Slovenia) Ken Ograjenšek	5	6	1	7	+2	4

source: IIHF.com

==== Goaltending leaders ====
(minimum 40% team's total ice time)

Pos	Player	MINS	GA	Sv%	GAA	SO
1	(Denmark) Lasse Jensen	120:00	2	96.72	1.00	0
2	(Austria) Andreas Brenkusch	124:24	3	94.00	1.45	1
3	(Austria) Christoph Lindenhofer	178:40	10	90.91	3.36	0
4	(Slovenia) Luka Gračnar	248:56	12	89.47	2.89	0
5	(Kazakhstan) Roman Shtefan	239:45	20	87.34	5.01	0

source: IIHF.com

==== IIHF Directorate awards ====
- Goaltender: (Slovenia) Luka Gračnar
- Defenceman: (Denmark) Jesper Jensen
- Forward: (Slovenia) Eric Pance
