= Ilya Malyushkin =

Russian ice hockey player

- Born: January 30, 1984 (age 41) Surgut, Russian SFSR
- Height: 5 ft 10 in (178 cm)
- Weight: 187 lb (85 kg; 13 st 5 lb)
- Position: Forward
- Shoots: Right
- KHL team Former teams: Avtomobilist Yekaterinburg; Rubin Tyumen; Severstal Cherepovets; Spartak Moscow; Yugra Khanty-Mansiysk
- Playing career: 2001–present

Ilya Malyushkin is a Russian professional ice hockey forward who currently plays for Avtomobilist Yekaterinburg of the Kontinental Hockey League.
