= Martin Kriška =

Slovak ice hockey player

- Born: 5 August 1984 (age 41) Liptovský Mikuláš, Czechoslovakia
- Height: 5 ft 11 in (180 cm)
- Weight: 174 lb (79 kg; 12 st 6 lb)
- Position: Right wing
- Shoots: Left
- team Former teams: Free agent MHK 32 Liptovský Mikuláš; HC Košice; HC 46 Bardejov; MHC Martin; Arlan Kokshetau; HC '05 Banská Bystrica; HC 19 Humenné
- Playing career: 2001–present

Martin Kriška (born 5 August 1984) is a Slovak professional ice hockey right winger. He is currently a free agent.

Kriška previously played the majority of his career with his hometown team MHK 32 Liptovský Mikuláš, where he played a total of 552 games. He also played for HC Košice and MHC Martin as well as for Arlan Kokshetau of the Kazakhstan Hockey Championship where he spent four seasons.

He returned to Liptovský Mikuláš in 2016 and was named captain in 2018. On January 31, 2020, Kriška joined HC '05 Banská Bystrica on loan for the remainder of the season in pursuit of a championship though the season would be prematurely curtailed due to the COVID-19 pandemic. He would then sign for the team permanently on August 2, 2020.
