= Denis Makarov (ice hockey) =

Russian ice hockey player (born 1983)

- Born: August 3, 1983 (age 42)
- Height: 5 ft 9 in (175 cm)
- Weight: 205 lb (93 kg; 14 st 9 lb)
- Position: Defence
- KHL team Former teams: HC Spartak Moscow; Khimik Voskresensk; Severstal Cherepovets; HC Lada Togliatti
- Playing career: 2000–present

Denis Makarov (born August 3, 1983) is a Russian ice hockey player who is currently playing for HC Spartak Moscow team in Russia.
