= Petr Kadlec =

Czech ice hockey player

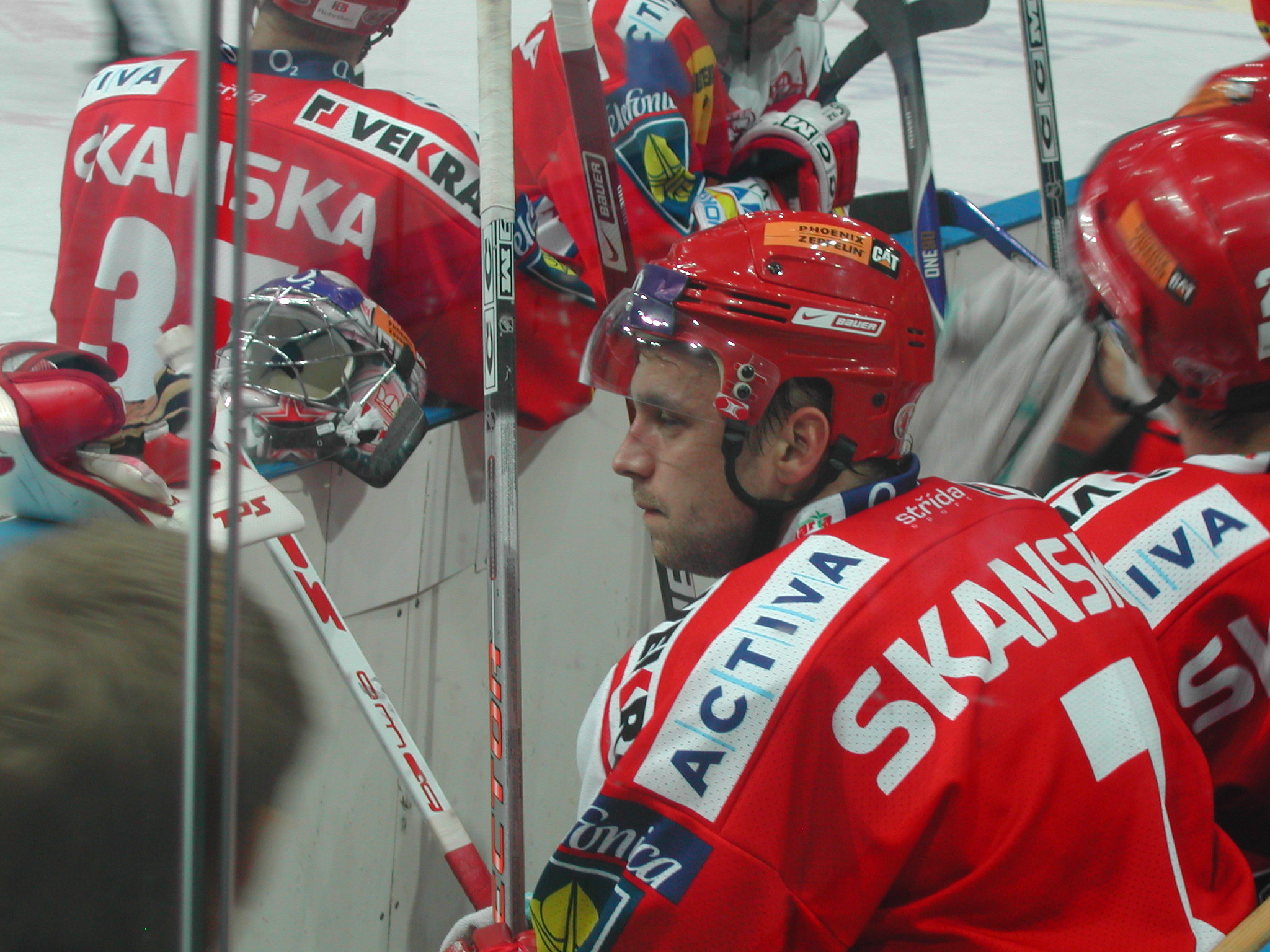
- Born: 5 January 1977 (age 49) Prague, TCH
- Height: 5 ft 10 in (178 cm)
- Weight: 170 lb (77 kg; 12 st 2 lb)
- Position: Defence
- Shot: Left
- Czech team Former teams: HC Plzeň; HC Slavia Praha
- NHL draft: 234th overall, 2003; Florida Panthers
- Playing career: 1995–2018

Petr Kadlec (born 5 January 1977 in Prague) is a Czech professional ice hockey defenceman who currently plays for HC Slavia Praha of the Czech Extraliga. Kadlec was drafted 234th overall in the 2003 NHL entry draft by the Florida Panthers, but has played his entire career within his native Czech Republic.

Kadlec previously played in each of his 19 professional seasons with HC Slavia Praha of the Czech Extraliga. After brief loan spells with HC Berounští Medvědi and HC Keramika Plzeň, Kadlec opted to endure his first full professional season away from Prague in signing a one-year deal with HC Keramika Plzeň for his 20th professional season on 2 May 2014.

== Career statistics ==
=== Regular season and playoffs ===
			Regular season					Playoffs
Season	Team	League	GP	G	A	Pts	PIM	GP	G	A	Pts	PIM
1995–96	HC Slavia Praha	CZE U20	23	2	12	14	—	—	—	—	—	—
1995–96	HC Slavia Praha	Czech	24	1	2	3	6	3	0	0	0	0
1995–96	HK Kaučuk Kralupy nad Vltavou	Czech2	4	0	1	1	0	—	—	—	—	—
1996–97	HC Slavia Praha	CZE U20	—	—	—	—	—	—	—	—	—	—
1996–97	HC Slavia Praha	Czech	39	0	3	3	18	—	—	—	—	—
1996–97	HC Berounští Medvědi	Czech2	5	0	2	2	—	—	—	—	—	—
1997–98	HC Slavia Praha	Czech	51	5	12	17	22	5	1	2	3	2
1998–99	HC Slavia Praha	Czech	48	2	14	16	22	—	—	—	—	—
1999–2000	HC Slavia Praha	Czech	12	0	0	0	10	—	—	—	—	—
1999–2000	HC Keramika Plzeň	Czech	39	6	21	27	32	7	0	4	4	0
2000–01	HC Slavia Praha	Czech	45	8	19	27	32	10	1	3	4	34
2001–02	HC Slavia Praha	Czech	52	5	25	30	63	9	0	3	3	14
2002–03	HC Slavia Praha	Czech	49	4	19	23	46	17	1	6	7	26
2003–04	HC Slavia Praha	Czech	36	3	18	21	32	17	2	5	7	14
2004–05	HC Slavia Praha	Czech	52	2	14	16	40	7	0	2	2	8
2005–06	HC Slavia Praha	Czech	50	4	17	21	73	15	4	3	7	10
2006–07	HC Slavia Praha	Czech	52	2	15	17	60	2	0	0	0	0
2007–08	HC Slavia Praha	Czech	40	2	15	17	60	19	2	7	9	22
2008–09	HC Slavia Praha	Czech	50	3	27	30	70	18	1	11	12	18
2009–10	HC Slavia Praha	Czech	52	4	16	20	82	15	3	12	15	26
2010–11	HC Slavia Praha	Czech	42	2	21	23	64	19	1	8	9	30
2011–12	HC Slavia Praha	Czech	45	7	20	27	50	—	—	—	—	—
2012–13	HC Slavia Praha	Czech	46	7	20	27	126	11	3	6	9	4
2013–14	HC Slavia Praha	Czech	46	5	22	27	64	3	1	3	4	2
2014–15	HC Škoda Plzeň	Czech	48	3	24	27	46	4	1	3	4	6
2015–16	HC Škoda Plzeň	Czech	43	3	21	24	34	11	0	7	7	6
2016–17	HC Škoda Plzeň	Czech	39	2	17	19	18	11	1	4	5	8
2017–18	HC Škoda Plzeň	Czech	25	0	9	9	12	10	0	3	3	4
Czech totals			1,025	80	391	471	1,094	213	22	92	114	234

=== International ===
Year	Team	Event	GP	G	A	Pts	PIM
1997	Czech Republic	WJC	7	0	0	0	6
2003	Czech Republic	WC	9	1	6	7	12
Senior totals			9	1	6	7	12
