= Vadym Iermolaiev =

Businessman and investor

- Вадим Єрмолаєв
- Born: 13 May 1968 (age 58); Dnipropetrovsk, Ukrainian SSR, Soviet Union (present-day Dnipro, Ukraine)
- Citizenship: Cyprus (since 2019); Ukraine (until 2019)
- Occupations: Businessman; investor
- Website: https://vadymiermolaiev.info

Vadym Volodymyrovych Iermolaiev (Note: Ukrainian: Вадим Володимирович Єрмолаєв; also transliterated as Vadim Vladimirovich Yermolayev (Russian: Вадим Владимирович Ермолаев)) (born 13 May 1968) is a Ukrainian-born Cypriot oligarch and investor based in Monaco. As of 2020, Iermolaiev was rated as the 23rd richest person in Ukraine by Focus magazine.

== Biography ==
Born in Dnipro, Ukraine to Jewish parents, Vadym Iermolaiev received his economic degree at the Dnipropetrovsk College of Technology and Economics in 1987.

Iermolaiev is the most influential Dnipropetrovsk businessman and is the largest developer in Dnipro, according to Forbes Ukraine. He is recognised for changing the urban architecture.

In 1995, Iermolaiev founded Primus inter pares, an industrial corporation. Two years later, the company was renamed Alef. In 2001, Iermolaiev founded Alef Estate to focus on commercial construction. In 2004, the company completed the development of New centre, the first big shopping centre in Dnipro. In 2006, Most-City, the biggest trade centre of Ukraine, was built, also in Dnipro. The company also implemented such projects as Cascade Plaza mixed-use complex, Bosphorus shopping mall, Enigma and Prisma business centres.

Iermolaiev is the creator and investor of Katerynoslavsky Boulevard (renamed Kelnsky Boulevard in December 2023), a cultural pedestrian area in the historic centre of Dnipro. In recent years, Alef Estate has been developing such projects as Perekhrestya shopping mall, Ermolaev Centre mixed-use complex, Artel shopping mall (Katerynoslavska cloth factory), Port City Apartment Complex, Boulevard on Yuzhnaya Street, and Troitsky Residential Complex.

In April 2004, the Anti-Monopoly Committee of Ukraine officially permitted Procter & Gamble to acquire CJSC Olvia Beta Cleaning Products Co in Pokrov (then named Ordzhonikidze), Dnipropetrovsk Oblast, 25% of which was owned by Iermolaiev. In 2004, the funds from the sale of the plant were invested in new large-scale projects in the eastern region of Ukraine. Plants for the production of plastic profile for windows Miroplast, the production of aerated concrete UDK and the only plant in the CIS for the production of fittings for windows translucent structures Axor were opened in partnership with a Turkish company.

At the end of 2006, Iermolaiev sold CJSC Agrobank to PPF, a Czech financial group.

In 2012, Iermolaiev became a patron of the Kiddo Charity Foundation.

In 2014, Iermolaiev claimed that he lost all of his assets in Crimea after its annexation by the Russian Federation: specifically, production facilities and administrative premises of a company engaged in the production and sale of alcoholic beverages.

In 2019, he renounced his Ukrainian citizenship and became a citizen of Cyprus. He claimed in 2024 he had done this because he wanted “international protection.” According to Iermolaiev “The Ukrainian judicial system, to put it mildly, is not ideal, and the tax system is not objective.”

Iermolaiev was sanctioned by the Ukrainian government in 2023 due to the continued operations of his alcohol company in Crimea. He has denied these accusations claiming that Russia had seized his grape growing and cognac enterprise in Crimea when it annexed the peninsula in 2014. In December 2024 he legally tried to get the sanctions against him lifted. Iermolaiev has never publicly stated pro-Russian views. He did condemn Russia's invasion in an interview in 2024 stating “I despise our enemies and believe that they will bear responsibility for the grief they brought to Ukrainian land and to my hometown.” He also claimed he financially supported the Ukrainian Armed Forces.

Iermolaiev's son Artur was detained in Cyprus on 4 December 2025 at the request of Interpol. He was extradited to Estonia. Estonian investigators accused Artur, along with three other defendants, of having created fraudulent call centres in Ukraine. Investigators stated that between 2019 and 2022, the defendants received over €100m, €5.4m of which came from Estonian residents. Artur entered into a plea bargain with the Estonian court, he then received a suspended sentence and paid a €8.5m fine and then left Estonia. He is since banned from entering Estonia.

On 29 June 2026, a bomb exploded in the doorway of an apartment building in Monaco, injuring Iermolaiev, his mistress, and their 13-year-old son. The adults were left in critical condition. Iermolaiev was believed to be the bomb's target. According to Ukrainska Pravda he has resided in Monaco since February 2022 when Russia invaded Ukraine. He kept economic activity in occupied Ukraine and was sanctioned by Ukraine for it. The bombing is not believed to be related to politics or the war in Ukraine. Le Monde reported that it was "a settling of scores linked to organized crime". The main suspect, Anastasiia Berezovska, a Ukrainian woman who disguised herself as a man before the attack, was found murdered in Ukraine on 7 July. Authorities detained a Ukrainian intelligence officer and a former law enforcement official suspected of carrying out the murder; the intelligence officer later confessed to killing Berezovska.

=== Alef ===
Iermolaiev is the chairman of Alef. Alef's 13 companies operate in agribusiness (Agroalliance, Sady Dnipra), development (Alef Estate) and production of construction materials (AXOR Industry, MIROPLAST, UDK). Alef is also engaged in the production of dental implants and medical instruments (ABM Technology). The corporation employs more than 600,000 people.

The Alef Estate company has developed projects in Dnipro such as the Most-City shopping and entertainment centre, Cascade Plaza, the Bosphorus shopping and business centre, and others. In 2021, Alef Group resumed construction of the Brama complex in Dnipro after a twelve-year break. One of the towers, with 54 floors, was the tallest residential building in Ukraine.

== Wealth ==
The Korrespondent magazine included Vadym Iermolaiev in Zolota Sotnia ('The Golden Hundred') with a fortune of US$763M (36th position). Iermolaiev has been regularly included in the Focus magazine annual list of 'Ukraine's Top 100 Richest People' rating with an estimated wealth of:

- 2012 — US$214M (53rd position)
- 2013 — US$254M (40th position)
- 2014 — 34th position
- 2015 — 24th position
- 2016 — US$823M net worth (15th position)
- 2020 — 23rd position

In 2016, Iermolaiev's fortune was US$478M, according to Dragon Capital Investment Company, up US$66M on the previous year.

Prior to the 2022 Russian invasion of Ukraine, his net worth was estimated between $220 million and $300 million, ranking him around 23rd among Ukraine's wealthiest individuals according to various financial rankings.
