= Anton Dubinin =

Russian professional ice hockey player

- Born: 22 July 1985 (age 40) Moscow, RUS
- Height: 1.80 m (5 ft 11 in)
- Weight: 96 kg (212 lb; 15 st 2 lb)
- Position: Forward
- Shot: Right
- KAZ team: Arystan Temirtau
- Playing career: 2002–2018

Anton Vladimirovich Dubinin (Russian: Антон Владимирович Дубинин; born 22 July 1985) is a Russian former ice hockey player. His career, which lasted from 2002 to 2018, was mainly spent in the Russian lower leagues and Kazakhstan..
