= Dušan Devečka =

Slovak ice hockey player

- Born: 19 June 1980 (age 46) Liptovský Mikuláš, Czechoslovakia
- Height: 5 ft 11 in (180 cm)
- Weight: 176 lb (80 kg; 12 st 8 lb)
- Position: Defence
- Shot: Right
- Played for: MHk 32 Liptovský Mikuláš; HK Poprad; HC Dukla Jihlava; HC Slovan Bratislava; MsHK Zilina
- NHL draft: Undrafted
- Playing career: 1997–2020

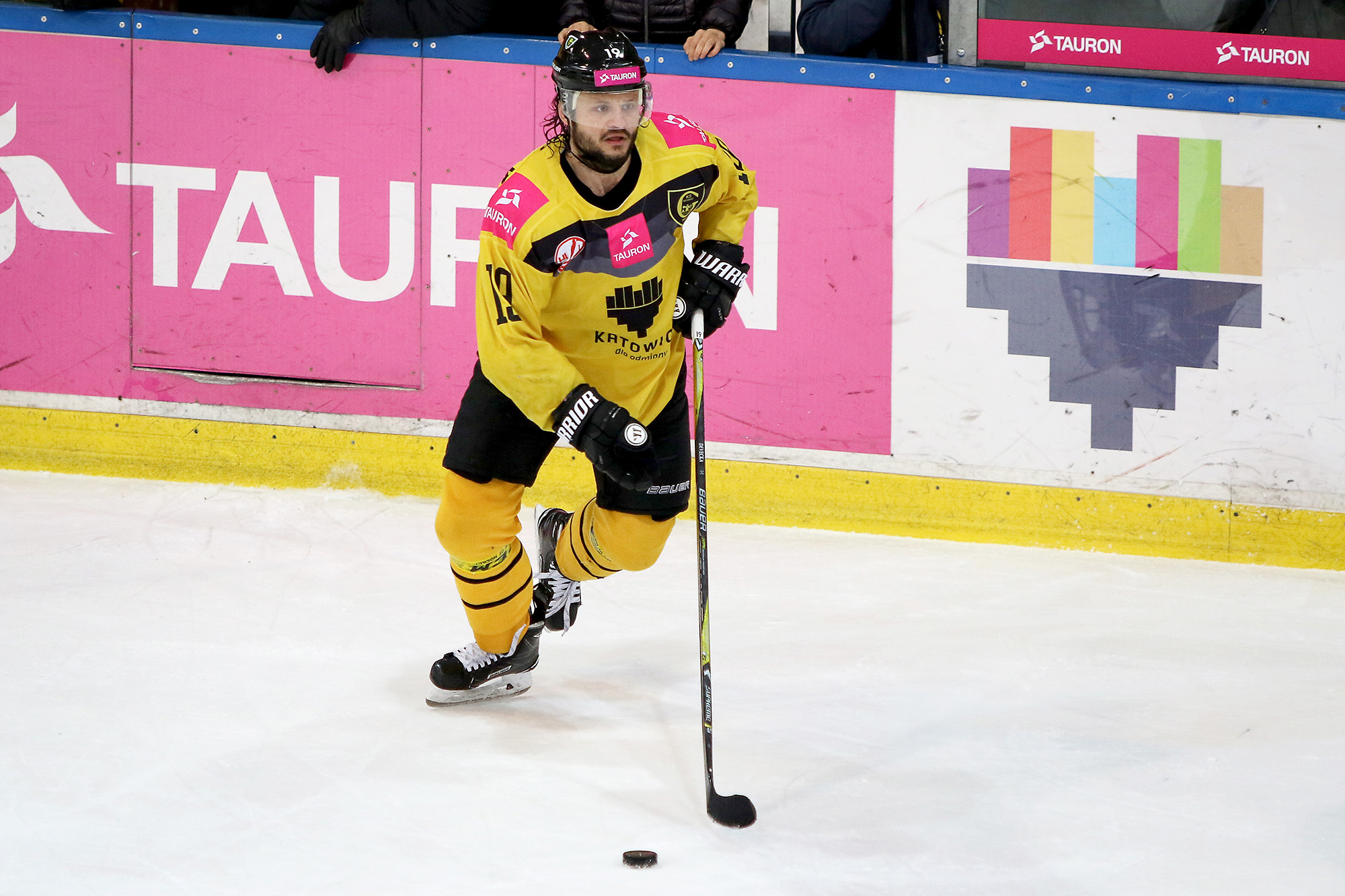

Dušan Devečka (born 19 June 1980) is a Slovak former professional ice hockey defenceman who played in the Slovak Extraliga and Czech Extraliga (ELH).
