= Elvijs Biezais =

Latvian ice hockey forward

- Born: June 30, 1991 (age 35) Riga, Latvian SSR, Soviet Union
- Height: 6 ft 0 in (183 cm)
- Weight: 190 lb (86 kg; 13 st 8 lb)
- Position: Wing
- Shoots: L
- KHL team Former teams: Dinamo Riga; SK Riga 91; SK LSPA/Riga; HK Riga
- National team: Latvia
- Playing career: 2007–present

Elvijs Biezais (born June 30, 1991, in Riga, Soviet Union) is a Latvian ice hockey forward, currently playing for Dinamo Riga of Kontinental Hockey League. He played for several Latvian league youth teams before joining HK Riga.

On September 6, 2012, he made his debut in loss against HC Lev Praha.
