= Kulager Petropavl =

- City: Petropavl, Kazakhstan
- League: Pro Hokei Ligasy
- Founded: 2015
- Home arena: Alexander Vinokourov Sports Palace
- Colours
- General manager: Bolat Karabalin
- Head coach: Vyacheslav Belan
- Website: hkqulager.kz

Kulager Hockey Club (Kazakh: «Құлагер» хоккей клубы, Qulager Hokei Kluby; Russian: Хоккейный клуб «Кулагер»), commonly referred as Kulager Petropavl, is a professional ice hockey team based in Petropavl, Kazakhstan. They were founded in 2015, and play in the Pro Hokei Ligasy, the top level of ice hockey in Kazakhstan.
