= 2014–15 Kazakhstan Hockey Championship =

- League: Kazakhstan Hockey Championship
- Sport: Ice Hockey
- Duration: end of 2014–24 April 2015
- Games: 294
- Teams: 10
- Total attendance: 256397

Regular season
- Season champions: Arlan Kokshetau
- Top scorer: (Russia) Ivan Kiselyov (HC Astana) (40 points)

Finals
- Champions: Yertis Pavlodar
- Runners-up: Arlan Kokshetau

Kazakhstan Hockey Championship seasons
- ← 2013–14 2015–16 →

The 2014–15 Kazakhstan Hockey Championship was the 23rd season since the founding of the Kazakhstan Hockey Championship.

== Teams ==
Teams of the 2014-15 KHC season

Team	City	Arena
Arlan Kokshetau	Kokshetau	Burabay Arena
Arystan Temirtau	Temirtau	Temirtau Muz Aydyny
Beibarys Atyrau	Atyrau	Khiuaz Dospanova Ice Palace
Berkut Karagandy	Karagandy	Karagandy-Arena
Gornyak Rudny	Rudny	Rudny Ice Palace
HC Almaty	Almaty	Baluan Sholak Palace of Culture and Sports
HC Astana	Astana	Kazakhstan Sport Palace
Nomad Astana	Astana	Kazakhstan Sport Palace
Torpedo Oskemen	Ust-Kamenogorsk	Boris Alexandrov Sport Palace
Yertis Pavlodar	Pavlodar	Astana Ice Palace

== Regular season ==
=== Standings ===
Team	Pld	W	OTW	OTL	L	GF	GA	GD	Pts	Qualification
Arlan Kokshetau	54	34	4	5	11	246	142	+104	115	Direct playoff qualification
Gornyak Rudny	54	34	4	3	13	194	122	+72	113	Direct playoff qualification
Yertis Pavlodar	54	31	4	5	14	223	152	+71	106	Direct playoff qualification
Beibarys Atyrau	54	27	8	7	12	139	107	+32	104	Direct playoff qualification
HC Almaty	54	25	11	5	13	170	127	+43	102	Direct playoff qualification
Arystan Temirtau	54	23	3	6	22	158	130	+28	81	Direct playoff qualification
Nomad Astana	54	18	3	8	25	151	160	−9	68	Direct playoff qualification
HC Astana	54	16	8	2	28	174	161	+13	66	Direct playoff qualification
Berkut Karagandy	54	14	2	7	31	133	176	−43	53	
Torpedo Oskemen	54	0	1	0	53	90	401	−311	2	

== Play-off ==
=== Quarterfinals ===
==== Arlan Kokshetau vs. HC Astana ====
3 March	Arlan Kokshetau	3–2	HC Astana	Burabay Arena, Kokshetau
Dustin Wood – 08:51; Nico Aaltonen – 12:23		First period	No scoring
No scoring		Second period	No scoring
Vladimir Markelov – 59:25		Third period	41:31 – Yevgeni Moshkarev; 42:50 – Sergei Ivanov
Teemu Seppänen		Goalie stats	Alexander Smelyanets

4 March	Arlan Kokshetau	2–0	HC Astana	Burabay Arena, Kokshetau
No scoring		First period	No scoring
Arturs Ozoliņš – 33:33		Second period	No scoring
Vadim Ermolayev – 41:52		Third period	No scoring
Emil Safin		Goalie stats	Sergei Silantyev

7 March	HC Astana	4–5	OT	Arlan Kokshetau	Kazakhstan Sport Palace, Astana
Rolands Gritāns – 08:48		First period		03:32 – Andrei Kurachev
Alexey Grishchenko – 28:22		Second period		24:16 – Arturs Ozoliņš; 25:38 – Vadim Ermolayev
Sergei Ivanov – 49:20; Yaroslav Sanzharev – 52:26		Third period		50:44 – Martin Kriška
No scoring		First overtime period		70:18 – Dušan Devečka
Sergei Silantyev		Goalie stats		Teemu Seppänen

8 March	HC Astana	3–5	Arlan Kokshetau	Kazakhstan Sport Palace, Astana
No scoring		First period	07:38 – Yannick Riendeau
Alexey Grishchenko – 20:33; Ivan Kiselyov – 25:25; Ivan Kiselyov – 34:38		Second period	27:58 – Alexander Dolishnya; 33:04 – Elvijs Biezais
No scoring		Third period	50:44 – Ivan Kuchin; 59:33 – Yannick Riendeau
Sergei Silantyev		Goalie stats	Teemu Seppänen

Arlan Kokshetau won series 4–0

==== Gornyak Rudny vs. Nomad Astana ====
3 March	Gornyak Rudny	2–1	Nomad Astana	Rudny Ice Palace, Rudny
No scoring		First period	No scoring
23:17 – Andrei Medyanik; 27:46 – Andrei Makrov		Second period	32:56 – Artyom Burdelyov
No scoring		Third period	No scoring
Anton Todykov		Goalie stats	Dmitri Ryazhinov; Artemi Proshkin

4 March	Gornyak Rudny	4–2	Nomad Astana	Rudny Ice Palace, Rudny
05:24 – Pavel Zhilin		First period	No scoring
18:08 – Vadim Strelchuk; 19:21 – Sergei Stupin		Second period	17:04 – Artyom Burdelyov
20:45 – Paul Manushin		Third period	43:49 – Artyom Burdelyov
Anton Todykov		Goalie stats	Artemi Proshkin

7 March	Nomad Astana	2–1 (OT)	Gornyak Rudny	Kazakhstan Sport Palace, Astana
No scoring		First period	No scoring
No scoring		Second period	No scoring
41:49 – Kirill Panyukov		Third period	52:10 – Paul Manushin
72:19 – Bulat Khammatov		overtime period
Alexei Ivanov		Goalie stats	Anton Todykov

8 March	Nomad Astana	2–1 (OT)	Gornyak Rudny	Kazakhstan Sport Palace, Astana
No scoring		First period	No scoring
39:14 – Yaroslav Evdokimov		Second period	No scoring
No scoring		Third period	55:31 – Sergei Stupin
73:02 – Daulet Kenbayev		Overtime	No scoring
Alexei Ivanov		Goalie stats	Anton Todykov

11 March	Gornyak Rudny	3–1	Nomad Astana	Rudny Ice Palace, Rudny
No scoring		First period	16:36 – Bulat Khammatov
No scoring		Second period	No scoring
42:42 – Vadim Strelchuk; 47:48 – Andrei Makrov; 53:56 – Alexander Kurshuk		Third period	No scoring
Anton Todykov		Goalie stats	Alexei Ivanov

14 March	Nomad Astana	4–1	Gornyak Rudny	Kazakhstan Sport Palace, Astana
11:34 – Yaroslav Evdokimov; 13:21 – Alexei Antsiferov		First period	No scoring
No scoring		Second period	38:33 – Dmitri Pozin
45:07 – Artyom Burdelyov; 59:47 – Yaroslav Evdokimov		Third period	No scoring
Alexei Ivanov		Goalie stats	Anton Todykov; Mikhail Smolnikov

17 March	Gornyak Rudny	4–0	Nomad Astana	Rudny Ice Palace, Rudny
03:00 – Pavel Zhilin		First period	No scoring
18:30 – Danil Pilyugin		Second period	No scoring
45:58 – Andrei Makrov; 57:58 – Andrei Makrov		Third period	No scoring
Anton Todykov		Goalie stats	Alexei Ivanov

Gornyak Rudny won series 4–3

==== Yertis Pavlodar vs. Arystan Temirtau ====
3 March	Yertis Pavlodar	2–1 (OT)	Arystan Temirtau	Astana Ice Palace, Pavlodar
No scoring		First period	No scoring
20:49 – Samuel Mlynarovič		Second period	No scoring
No scoring		Third period	51:42 – Ivan Ivanov
61:54 – Alexei Vorontsov		Overtime	No scoring
Marek Pinc		Goalie stats	Filipp Sirik

4 March	Yertis Pavlodar	4–2	Arystan Temirtau	Astana Ice Palace, Pavlodar
05:09 – Maxim Hudyakov		First period	00:17 – Maxim Sharifyanov; 16:01 – Vitali Smolyaninov
32:40 – Olexander Pobedonostsev; 39:57 – Robert Huna		Second period	No scoring
43:43 – Samuel Mlynarovič		Third period	No scoring
Marek Pinc		Goalie stats	Filipp Sirik

7 March	Arystan Temirtau	3–1	Yertis Pavlodar	Temirtau Muz Aydyny, Temirtau
00:17 – Sergei Salnikov		First period	No scoring
36:19 – Maxim Sharifyanov		Second period	29:32 – Yevgeni Mazunin
45:33 – Ilgiz Nuriyev		Third period	No scoring
Filipp Sirik		Goalie stats	Marek Pinc

8 March	Arystan Temirtau	2–1	Yertis Pavlodar	Temirtau Muz Aydyny, Temirtau
No scoring		First period	No scoring
31:33 – Alexei Obukhov		Second period	26:49 – Maxim Hudyakov
51:13 – Maxim Volkov		Third period	No scoring
Filipp Sirik		Goalie stats	Marek Pinc

11 March	Yertis Pavlodar	7–4	Arystan Temirtau	Astana Ice Palace, Pavlodar
04:30 – Tomas Vak; 08:01 – Patrik Svitana; 11:38 – Martin Hovan		First period	No scoring
32:42 – Olexander Pobedonostsev		Second period	26:08 – Sergei Salnikov; 39:41 – Alexei Petushkov
40:28 – Patrik Svitana; 45:27 – Alexei Vorontsov; 59:52 – Robert Huna		Third period	44:37 – Vitali Smolyaninov; 49:08 – Lukas Martinka
Marek Pinc		Goalie stats	Filipp Sirik

14 March	Arystan Temirtau	1–4	Yertis Pavlodar	Temirtau Muz Aydyny, Temirtau
No scoring		First period	14:05 – Martin Hujsa
25:52 – Yevgeni Gevel		Second period	32:42 – Olexander Pobedonostsev
No scoring		Third period	54:45 – Yevgeni Mazunin; 58:17 – Maxim Hudyakov
Filipp Sirik		Goalie stats	Marek Pinc

Yertis Pavlodar won series 4–2

==== Beibarys Atyrau vs. HC Almaty ====
3 March	Beibarys Atyrau	0–4	HC Almaty	Khiuaz Dospanova Ice Palace, Atyrau
No scoring		First period	19:57 – Alexander Tatarinov
No scoring		Second period	23:03 – Alexander Tatarinov; 31:34 – Sergei Tyurin
No scoring		Third period	50:45 – Alexander Tatarinov
Matija Pintarič		Goalie stats	Vadim Zhelobnyuk

4 March	Beibarys Atyrau	0–3	HC Almaty	Khiuaz Dospanova Ice Palace, Atyrau
No scoring		First period	No scoring
No scoring		Second period	22:42 – Yevgeni Bumagin
No scoring		Third period	41:58 – Anton Kazantsev; 59:42 – Andrei Ogorodnikov
Matija Pintarič		Goalie stats	Vadim Zhelobnyuk

7 March	HC Almaty	2–0	Beibarys Atyrau	Baluan Sholak Palace of Culture and Sports, Almaty
No scoring		First period	No scoring
No scoring		Second period	No scoring
45:50 – Anatoli Stepanov; 59:59 – Alexander Tatarinov		Third period	No scoring
Vadim Zhelobnyuk		Goalie stats	Maris Jucers

8 March	HC Almaty	1–2 (OT)	Beibarys Atyrau	Baluan Sholak Palace of Culture and Sports, Almaty
No scoring		First period	09:09 – Kirill Sidorenko
27:41 – Alexander Trofimov		Second period	No scoring
No scoring		Third period	No scoring
No scoring		Overtime	75:27 – Eliezer Sherbatov
Vadim Zhelobnyuk		Goalie stats	Maris Jucers

11 March	Beibarys Atyrau	3–2	HC Almaty	Khiuaz Dospanova Ice Palace, Atyrau
01:07 – Eliezer Sherbatov		First period	No scoring
28:09 – Yevgeni Zhdanov		Second period	33:36 – Nerijus Ališauskas
56:18 – Raimonds Vilkoits		Third period	56:47 – Pavel Zyatkov
Maris Jucers		Goalie stats	Vadim Zhelobnyuk

14 March	HC Almaty	1–4	Beibarys Atyrau	Baluan Sholak Palace of Culture and Sports, Almaty
No scoring		First period	10:38 – Johan Lorraine
No scoring		Second period	20:56 – Jesse Häkkinen; 24:39 – Johan Lorraine; 29:38 – Pavel Karatayev
59:59 – Alexander Trofimov		Third period	No scoring
Vadim Zhelobnyuk		Goalie stats	Maris Jucers

17 March	Beibarys Atyrau	2–0	HC Almaty	Khiuaz Dospanova Ice Palace, Atyrau
No scoring		First period	No scoring
37:07 – Alexey Lozhkin		Second period	No scoring
58:40 – Yevgeni Zhdanov		Third period	No scoring
Vadim Zhelobnyuk		Goalie stats	Maris Jucers

Beibarys Atyrau won series 4–3

=== Semi-finals ===
==== Arlan Kokshetau vs. Beibarys Atyrau ====
20 March	Arlan Kokshetau	5–0	Beibarys Atyrau	Burabay Arena, Kokshetau
14:28 – Alexander Dolishnya		First period	No scoring
37:41 – Martin Kriška		Second period	No scoring
43:41 – Marek Mašlonka; 44:12 – Vadim Ermolayev; 45:44 – Yannick Riendeau		Third period	No scoring
Teemu Seppänen		Goalie stats	Maris Jucers

21 March	Arlan Kokshetau	1–2	Beibarys Atyrau	Burabay Arena, Kokshetau
No scoring		First period	No scoring
32:07 – Vladimir Markelov		Second period	30:33 – Johan Lorraine
No scoring		Third period	57:49 – Eliezer Shcherbatov
Teemu Seppänen		Goalie stats	Matija Pintarič

24 March	Beibarys Atyrau	2–4	Arlan Kokshetau	Khiuaz Dospanova Ice Palace, Atyrau
17:06 – Mikhail Kachulin		First period	No scoring
25:49 – Kirill Sidorenko		Second period	24:22 – Yannick Riendeau; 29:53 – Ivan Kuchin; 32:05 – Vladimir Markelov
No scoring		Third period	59:54 – Ivan Kuchin
Matija Pintarič; Maris Jucers		Goalie stats	Teemu Seppänen

25 March	Beibarys Atyrau	1–2 (OT)	Arlan Kokshetau	Khiuaz Dospanova Ice Palace, Atyrau
No scoring		First period	13:42 – Ivan Kuchin
No scoring		Second period	No scoring
45:51 – Matic Kralj		Third period	No scoring
No scoring		Overtime	63:13 – Rastislav Gašpar
Matija Pintarič		Goalie stats	Teemu Seppänen

28 March	Arlan Kokshetau	4–2	Beibarys Atyrau	Burabay Arena, Kokshetau
16:38 – Elvijs Biezais		First period	00:22 – Matic Kralj; 04:48 – Yevgeni Zhdanov
27:42 – Yannick Riendeau		Second period	No scoring
58:23 – Arturs Ozoliņš; 59:28 – Ivan Kuchin		Third period	No scoring
Teemu Seppänen		Goalie stats	Matija Pintarič

Arlan Kokshetau won series 4–1

==== Gornyak Rudny vs. Yertis Pavlodar ====
20 March	Gornyak Rudny	2–6	Yertis Pavlodar	Rudny Ice Palace, Rudny
19:55 – Igor Zakharov		First period	No scoring
No scoring		Second period	22:56 – Martin Hujsa; 24:17 – Richard Huna; 36:31 – Martin Hujsa; 39:53 – Martin Belluš
53:34 – Alexander Kurshuk		Third period	46:50 – Robert Huna; 48:21 – Patrik Svitana
Anton Todykov; Mikhail Smolnikov		Goalie stats	Marek Pinc

21 March	Gornyak Rudny	2–1	Yertis Pavlodar	Rudny Ice Palace, Rudny
No scoring		First period	No scoring
25:08 – Pavel Zhilin; 38:47 – Pavel Zhilin		Second period	35:20 – Vyacheslav Tryasunov
No scoring		Third period	No scoring
Anton Todykov; Mikhail Smolnikov		Goalie stats	Marek Pinc

24 March	Yertis Pavlodar	3–2	Gornyak Rudny	Astana Ice Palace, Pavlodar
No scoring		First period	No scoring
No scoring		Second period	No scoring
42:17 – Richard Huna; 54:11 – Denis Klemeshov; 59:13 – Martin Hujsa		Third period	44:23 – Igor Zakharov; 53:19 – Pavel Zhilin
Marek Pinc		Goalie stats	Anton Todykov

25 March	Yertis Pavlodar	5–2	Gornyak Rudny	Astana Ice Palace, Pavlodar
00:16 – Yevgeni Mazunin; 15:25 – Denis Klemeshov		First period	11:22 – Ilya Gorozhaninov
32:24 – Martin Hujsa		Second period	37:31 – Alexei Krasavin
43:24 – Robert Huna; 59:02 – Tomas Vak		Third period	No scoring
Marek Pinc		Goalie stats	Anton Todykov

28 March	Gornyak Rudny	2–4	Yertis Pavlodar	Rudny Ice Palace, Rudny
05:33 – Pavel Zhilin		First period	No scoring
No scoring		Second period	21:26 – Tomas Vak; 21:57 – Martin Hovan
42:12 – Paul Manushin		Third period	48:36 – Sergei Miroshnichenko; 55:25 – Robert Huna
Anton Todykov		Goalie stats	Marek Pinc

Yertis Pavlodar won series 4–1

== Bronze medal match ==
=== Gornyak Rudny vs. Beibarys Atyrau ===
5 April	Gornyak Rudny	3–2	Beibarys Atyrau	Rudny Ice Palace, Rudny
16:10 – Dmitri Pozin		First period	No scoring
26:18 – Alexander Kurshuk		Second period	36:55 – Eliezer Shcherbatov
53:26 – Andrei Makrov		Third period	49:08 – Kirill Sidorenko
Anton Todykov		Goalie stats	Maris Jucers

6 April	Gornyak Rudny	5–3	Beibarys Atyrau	Rudny Ice Palace, Rudny
06:56 – Alexei Krasavin; 13:57 – Vadim Strelchuk		First period	No scoring
No scoring		Second period	24:40 – Mikhail Kozlov; 35:32 – Raimonds Vilkoits
48:22 – Alexei Koptyaev; 49:17 – Pavel Zhilin; 58:51 – Alexei Koptyaev		Third period	59:24 – Matic Kralj
Anton Todykov		Goalie stats	Matija Pintarič

10 April	Beibarys Atyrau	2–3 (OT)	Gornyak Rudny	Khiuaz Dospanova Ice Palace, Atyrau
06:00 – Johan Lorraine		First period	11:50 – Dmitri Pozin
No scoring		Second period	39:18 – Alexei Krasavin
52:02 – Yevgeni Zhdanov		Third period	No scoring
No scoring		Overtime	60:51 – Alexei Krasavin
Maris Jucers		Goalie stats	Anton Todykov

Gornyak Rudny won series 3–0

== Final ==
=== Arlan Kokshetau vs. Yertis Pavlodar ===
10 April	Arlan Kokshetau	2–6	Yertis Pavlodar	Burabay Arena, Kokshetau
No scoring		First period	01:48 – Tomas Vak; 13:24 – Martin Belluš
20:54 – Arturs Ozoliņš; 37:28 – Vadim Ermolayev		Second period	25:13 – Martin Hujsa; 28:46 – Sergei Miroshnichenko
No scoring		Third period	41:51 – Viktor Zakharov; 52:22 – Richard Huna
Teemu Seppänen		Goalie stats	Marek Pinc

11 April	Arlan Kokshetau	4–2	Yertis Pavlodar	Burabay Arena, Kokshetau
05:46 – Nico Aaltonen		First period	No scoring
24:19 – Ivan Mikhailov; 36:00 – Dušan Devečka		Second period	No scoring
57:32 – Elvijs Biezais		Third period	55:53 – Samuel Mlynarovič; 58:29 – Sergei Miroshnichenko
Teemu Seppänen		Goalie stats	Marek Pinc

14 April	Yertis Pavlodar	3–2	Arlan Kokshetau	Astana Ice Palace, Pavlodar
04:21 – Samuel Mlynarovič		First period	08:38 – Martin Kriška
20:43 – Patrik Svitana; 25:54 – Martin Hujsa		Second period	No scoring
No scoring		Third period	41:31 – Martin Kriška
Marek Pinc		Goalie stats	Teemu Seppänen

15 April	Yertis Pavlodar	7–4	Arlan Kokshetau	Astana Ice Palace, Pavlodar
06:34 – Robert Huna		First period	No scoring
22:20 – Samuel Mlynarovič; 28:00 – Peter Fabuš; 29:35 – Denis Klemeshev; 36:50 – Richard Huna; 39:20 – Patrik Svitana		Second period	30:56 – Dustin Wood; 38:00 – Ivan Kuchin
52:57 – Patrik Svitana		Third period	No scoring
Marek Pinc		Goalie stats	Teemu Seppänen; Emil Safin

24 April	Arlan Kokshetau	2–3	Yertis Pavlodar	Burabay Arena, Kokshetau
04:13 – Elvijs Biezais		First period	07:51 – Martin Hujsa
No scoring		Second period	No scoring
49:28 – Marek Mašlonka		Third period	40:20 – Tomas Vak; 42:11 – Tomas Vak
Teemu Seppänen		Goalie stats	Marek Pinc

Yertis Pavlodar won series 4–1
