= Kirill Sidorenko =

Russian ice hockey player

- Born: March 30, 1983 (age 43) Omsk, USSR
- Height: 6 ft 3 in (191 cm)
- Weight: 192 lb (87 kg; 13 st 10 lb)
- Position: Forward
- Shot: Left
- Played for: RSL; Novosibirsk Siber; Krylja Sovetov
- NHL draft: 180th overall, 2002; Dallas Stars
- Playing career: 2002–2019

Kirill Sidorenko (born March 30, 1983) is a Russian professional ice hockey forward. He was selected by Dallas Stars in the 6th round (180th overall) of the 2002 NHL entry draft. Sidorenko played in the Russian Superleague with Novosibirsk Siber during the 2002–03 season, and with Krylja Sovetov during the 2006–07 season.

== Career statistics ==
=== Regular season and playoffs ===
			Regular season					Playoffs
Season	Team	League	GP	G	A	Pts	PIM	GP	G	A	Pts	PIM
1998–99	Avangard–VDV Omsk	RUS.3	2	0	0	0	2	—	—	—	—	—
1999–2000	Avangard–VDV Omsk	RUS.3	26	2	11	13	14	—	—	—	—	—
2000–01	Avangard–VDV Omsk	RUS.3	31	8	7	15	44	—	—	—	—	—
2001–02	Mostovik Kurgan	RUS.2	45	9	3	12	16	—	—	—	—	—
2001–02	Mostovik–2 Kurgan	RUS.4	1	1	0	1	0	—	—	—	—	—
2002–03	Sibir Novosibirsk	RSL	30	1	1	2	2	—	—	—	—	—
2002–03	Sibir–2 Novosibirsk	RUS.3	4	4	1	5	0	—	—	—	—	—
2003–04	Omskie Yastreby	RUS.3	1	0	1	1	0	—	—	—	—	—
2003–04	Energia Kemerovo	RUS.2	14	1	1	2	6	—	—	—	—	—
2003–04	Zauralie Kurgan	RUS.2	32	3	3	6	6	4	0	0	0	27
2003–04	Zauralie–2 Kurgan	RUS.3	2	1	2	3	0	—	—	—	—	—
2004–05	Omskie Yastreby	RUS.3	24	8	5	13	16	—	—	—	—	—
2004–05	CSK VVS Samara	RUS.2	16	2	2	4	0	—	—	—	—	—
2004–05	CSK VVS–2 Samara	RUS.3	4	0	0	0	0	—	—	—	—	—
2005–06	CSK VVS Samara	RUS.2	47	8	11	19	62	—	—	—	—	—
2005–06	Krylia Sovetov Moscow	RUS.2	6	3	3	6	8	17	1	3	4	4
2006–07	Krylia Sovetov Moscow	RSL	35	5	4	9	22	—	—	—	—	—
2006–07	Krylia Sovetov–2 Moscow	RUS.3	4	2	1	3	6	—	—	—	—	—
2007–08	Titan Klin	RUS.2	53	6	12	18	43	—	—	—	—	—
2007–08	Titan–2 Klin	RUS.4	1	2	4	6	0	—	—	—	—	—
2008–09	Kristall Saratov	RUS.2	56	17	9	26	54	—	—	—	—	—
2009–10	Zauralie Kurgan	RUS.2	40	4	8	12	10	4	0	2	2	2
2010–11	Izhstal Izhevsk	VHL	52	4	9	13	45	—	—	—	—	—
2011–12	Zauralie Kurgan	VHL	53	9	16	25	18	—	—	—	—	—
2012–13	Arlan Kokshetau	KAZ	17	5	3	8	10	—	—	—	—	—
2012–13	HC Astana	KAZ	32	16	13	29	26	4	0	1	1	0
2013–14	HC Lipetsk	VHL	31	6	9	15	10	—	—	—	—	—
2014–15	Beibarys Atyrau	KAZ	52	14	11	25	18	15	3	4	7	10
2015–16	Arlan Kokshetau	KAZ	54	16	16	32	12	17	1	2	3	2
2016–17	Yertis Pavlodar	KAZ	38	6	3	9	8	—	—	—	—	—
2016–17	Kulager Petropavl	KAZ	12	0	1	1	6	5	2	0	2	2
2017–18	HC Temirtau	KAZ	51	11	13	24	8	11	5	0	5	2
2018–19	HC Almaty	KAZ	5	0	0	0	2	—	—	—	—	—
2018–19	Gornyak Rudny	KAZ	38	5	9	14	8	—	—	—	—	—
RUS.2 & VHL totals			445	72	86	158	278	25	1	5	6	33
RSL totals			65	6	5	11	24	—	—	—	—	—
KAZ totals			299	73	69	142	98	52	11	7	18	16
