= Artemi Lakiza =

Kazakhstani ice hockey player

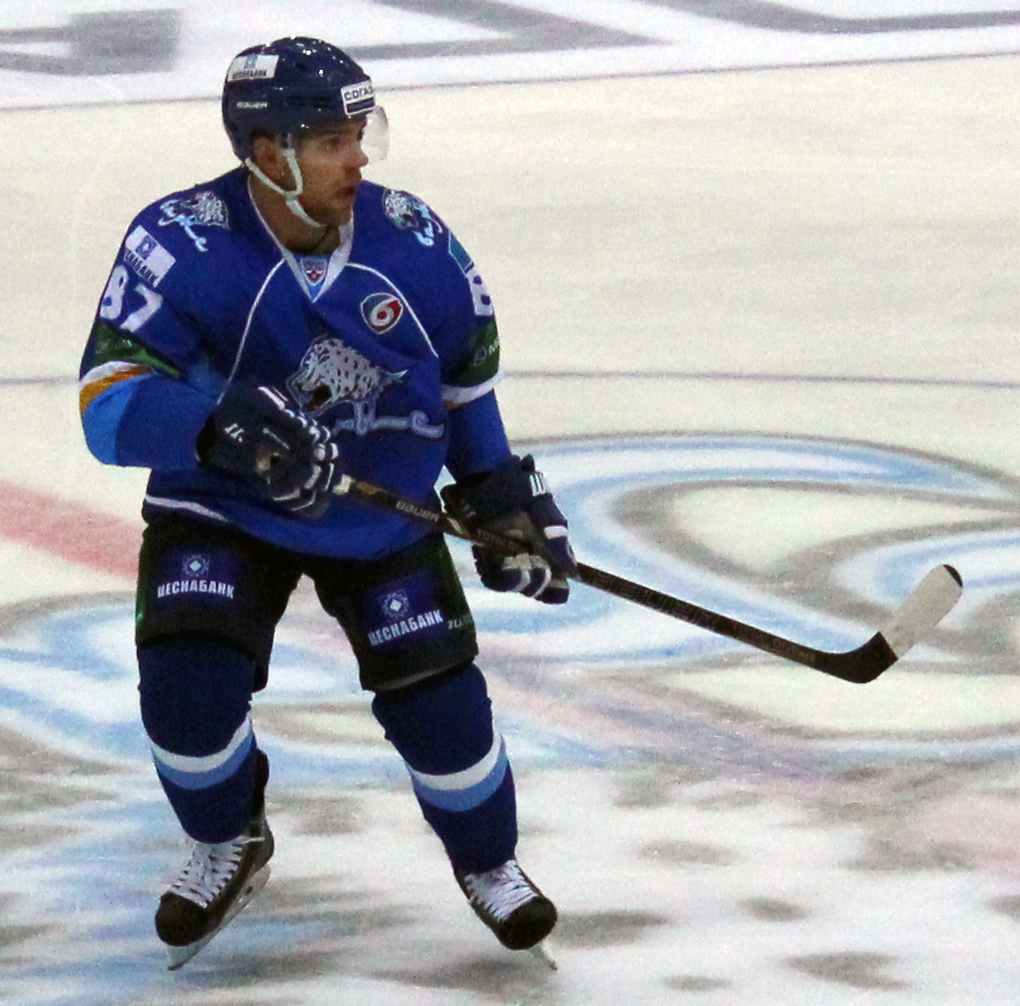
- Born: July 2, 1987 (age 39) Barnaul, Soviet Union
- Height: 5 ft 9 in (175 cm)
- Weight: 176 lb (80 kg; 12 st 8 lb)
- Position: Defence
- Shot: Left
- KAZ team Former teams: HC Almaty; Barys Astana
- National team: Kazakhstan
- NHL draft: Undrafted
- Playing career: 2004–2021

Artemi Viktorovich Lakiza (Russian: Артемий Викторович Лакиза; born July 2, 1987) is a Russian born Kazakhstani professional ice hockey defenceman. He is currently playing for HC Almaty in the Kazakhstan Hockey Championship (KAZ). He has formerly played with top tier Kazakh club, Barys Astana in the Kontinental Hockey League (KHL).

== Career statistics ==
			Regular season					Playoffs
Season	Team	League	GP	G	A	Pts	PIM	GP	G	A	Pts	PIM
2003–04	Amur Khabarovsk-2	Russia3	41	0	5	5	6	—	—	—	—	—
2004–05	Amur Khabarovsk-2	Russia3	8	4	2	6	14	—	—	—	—	—
2004–05	Golden Amur	Asia League	32	4	6	10	18	2	0	0	0	0
2005–06	Motor Barnaul	Russia2	43	1	3	4	43	3	0	0	0	2
2005–06	Motor Barnaul-2	Russia3	16	4	9	13	20	—	—	—	—	—
2006–07	Kazakhmys Satpaev	Kazakhstan	21	1	5	6	12	—	—	—	—	—
2006–07	Kazakhmys Satpaev	Russia2	48	2	9	11	24	—	—	—	—	—
2006–07	Kazakhmys Satpaev-2	Russia3	5	2	1	3	2	—	—	—	—	—
2007–08	Barys Astana	Russia2	52	2	5	7	30	7	1	1	2	2
2008–09	Barys Astana	KHL	27	0	2	2	30	—	—	—	—	—
2009–10	Barys Astana	KHL	7	0	0	0	0	1	0	0	0	0
2009–10	Barys Astana-2	Kazakhstan	16	3	8	11	10	—	—	—	—	—
2010–11	Barys Astana	KHL	1	0	0	0	0	—	—	—	—	—
2010–11	Barys Astana-2	Kazakhstan	40	9	17	26	24	15	2	9	11	14
2011–12	Barys Astana	KHL	35	0	1	1	24	—	—	—	—	—
2012–13	Barys Astana-2	Kazakhstan	29	4	5	9	16	5	0	1	1	4
2013–14	Barys Astana	KHL	34	2	4	6	10	—	—	—	—	—
2014–15	Barys Astana	KHL	16	0	0	0	6	4	0	0	0	0
2014–15	Nomad Astana	Kazakhstan	21	0	1	1	8	—	—	—	—	—
2015–16	Barys Astana	KHL	1	0	0	0	0	—	—	—	—	—
2015–16	Nomad Astana	Kazakhstan	43	5	17	22	18	—	—	—	—	—
2016–17	Barys Astana	KHL	3	0	0	0	0	—	—	—	—	—
2016–17	Nomad Astana	Kazakhstan	50	5	8	13	18	9	8	2	10	4
2017–18	Nomad Astana	Kazakhstan	43	5	14	19	12	—	—	—	—	—
2018–19	Nomad Astana	Kazakhstan	53	3	34	37	76	16	2	6	8	4
2019–20	HK Almaty	Kazakhstan	64	3	29	32	32	—	—	—	—	—
2020–21	Arlan Kokshetau	Kazakhstan	31	2	4	6	38	17	3	8	11	7
KHL totals			124	2	7	9	70	5	0	0	0	0
Kazakhstan totals			411	40	142	182	264	62	15	26	41	33
