= Hoon (disambiguation) =

Hoon is an Australian and New Zealand derogatory term for people who engage in anti-social behaviours.

Hoon may also refer to:

== People ==
- Hoon (Korean name), a Korean given name
- Ah Hoon (died 1909), Chinese-American comedian
- Geoff Hoon (born 1953), British politician
- Pierra Hoon (born 1909), first Thai woman physician
- Shannon Hoon (1967–1995), lead singer of the band Blind Melon
- Hoon Thien How (born 1986), Malaysian badminton assistant coach and former player

== Places ==
- Hoon, Derbyshire, England, a hamlet and civil parish
- Hoon, Iran, a village in Hormozgan Province

== Other uses ==
- Hun (instrument), a traditional Korean wind instrument
- Hoon (fiction) (ab-Guthatsa-ul-Rousit), a fictional extraterrestrial race from David Brin's Uplift Universe
- Hoon, a functional programming language used in the Urbit computing system

== See also ==
- Houn Jiyu-Kennett (1924–1996), born Peggy Teresa Nancy Kennett, British Zen Buddhist roshi, first female to be sanctioned by the Sōtō School of Japan to teach in the West
- Hun (disambiguation)
