= Huna =

Huna may refer to:

== Anthropological ==
- Huna people, invaders of northern India 5th–9th century
  - Huna Kingdom, mentioned in the ancient Indian epic Mahabharata
  - Hara Huna Kingdom, another kingdom in the epic

== Places ==
- Huna, Caithness, Scotland
- Man Huna, a village in Sagaing Township, Burma

== People ==
- Daniel Huňa (born 1979), Czech football player
- Huna b. Joshua, a Jewish Amora sage
- Huna Kamma, a Jewish Tanna sage
- Huna b. Nathan, a Jewish Amora sage
- James Te Huna (born 1981), New Zealand mixed martial artist
- Jodi Te Huna or Jodi Brown (born 1981), New Zealand netball player
- Mar ben Huna (died c. 614), head of the Sura Academy
- Raba bar Rav Huna (died 322), Jewish Talmudist in Babylonia
- Rav Huna (c. 216–c. 296), Jewish Talmudist in Babylonia, head of the Academy of Sura
- Richard Huna (born 1985), Slovak ice hockey player
- Robert Huna (born 1985), Slovak ice hockey player
- Rudolf Huna (born 1980), Slovak ice hockey player
- Huna of Thorney (born 7th century), Anglo-Saxon saint

== Other uses ==
- Huna (New Age), in metaphysics
- "Huna Buna", a song from Zephyr (Zephyr album)

== See also ==
- Hun (disambiguation)
