= Vitali Smolyaninov =

Kazakhstani ice hockey player

- Born: August 5, 1983 (age 42) Karaganda, Kazakh SSR, Soviet Union
- Height: 6 ft 3 in (191 cm)
- Weight: 205 lb (93 kg; 14 st 9 lb)
- Position: Left wing
- Shot: Left
- Played for: Barys Astana; HC Neftekhimik Nizhnekamsk
- NHL draft: 261st overall, 2001; Tampa Bay Lightning
- Playing career: 1998–2018

Vitali Ivanovich Smolyaninov (Russian: Виталий Иванович Смольянинов; born August 5, 1983) is a Kazakhstani former professional ice hockey player. He was selected by Tampa Bay Lightning in the 8th round (261st overall) of the 2001 NHL entry draft.

Sidorenko played in the Kontinental Hockey League with Barys Astana during the 2002-03 season, and with Krylja Sovetov during the 2008–09 KHL season.

== Career statistics ==
=== Regular season and playoffs ===
			Regular season					Playoffs
Season	Team	League	GP	G	A	Pts	PIM	GP	G	A	Pts	PIM
1998–99	Neftekhimik–2 Nizhnekamsk	RUS.3	12	1	0	1	0	—	—	—	—	—
1999–2000	Neftekhimik–2 Nizhnekamsk	RUS.3	54	7	7	14	28	—	—	—	—	—
2000–01	Neftekhimik–2 Nizhnekamsk	RUS.3	56	13	18	31	68	—	—	—	—	—
2001–02	Neftekhimik Nizhnekamsk	RSL	1	0	0	0	0	—	—	—	—	—
2001–02	Neftekhimik–2 Nizhnekamsk	RUS.3	72	32	23	55	114	—	—	—	—	—
2002–03	HC Voronezh	RUS.2	14	1	1	2	12	—	—	—	—	—
2002–03	HC Tambov	RUS.3	4	2	0	2	4	—	—	—	—	—
2003–04	Kazakhmys Karagandy	KAZ	9	2	3	5	0	—	—	—	—	—
2003–04	Kazakhmys Karagandy	RUS.2	19	0	1	1	32	—	—	—	—	—
2003–04	Kazakhmys–2 Karagandy	RUS.3	37	14	16	30	89	—	—	—	—	—
2004–05	Kazakhmys Karagandy	KAZ	7	5	3	8	2	—	—	—	—	—
2004–05	Kazakhmys Karagandy	RUS.2	20	1	5	6	10	—	—	—	—	—
2004–05	Kazakhmys–2 Karagandy	KAZ	5	0	1	1	0	—	—	—	—	—
2004–05	Kazakhmys–2 Karagandy	RUS.3	14	2	4	6	12	—	—	—	—	—
2004–05	Yertis Pavlodar	RUS.3	17	8	7	15	10	—	—	—	—	—
2005–06	Yertis Pavlodar	KAZ	14	8	6	14	12	—	—	—	—	—
2005–06	Yertis Pavlodar	RUS.3	61	31	28	59	92	—	—	—	—	—
2006–07	Barys Astana	KAZ	22	10	6	16	52	—	—	—	—	—
2006–07	Barys Astana	RUS.3	50	11	22	33	40	—	—	—	—	—
2007–08	Barys Astana	RUS.2	51	18	21	39	54	7	1	1	2	2
2008–09	Barys Astana	KHL	14	1	2	3	10	—	—	—	—	—
2008–09	HC Yugra	RUS.2	2	0	1	1	2	—	—	—	—	—
2008–09	Gazovik Tyumen	RUS.2	20	7	7	14	12	8	3	0	3	6
2009–10	Gazovik Tyumen	RUS.2	36	5	18	23	24	7	3	1	4	2
2010–11	Rubin Tyumen	VHL	35	9	7	16	40	12	2	2	4	20
2011–12	Kazzinc–Torpedo	VHL	30	9	7	16	26	5	0	3	3	2
2011–12	Kazzinc–Torpedo–2	KAZ	1	0	1	1	0	—	—	—	—	—
2012–13	Kazzinc–Torpedo	VHL	4	1	1	2	0	—	—	—	—	—
2012–13	HC Almaty	KAZ	33	11	9	20	28	5	1	3	4	4
2013–14	Sokol Krasnoyarsk	VHL	41	8	10	18	38	4	0	0	0	2
2014–15	Arystan Temirtau	KAZ	42	14	11	25	18	6	2	2	4	4
2015–16	Saryarka Karagandy	VHL	26	0	4	4	8	14	1	2	3	4
2015–16	HC Temirtau	KAZ	14	3	6	9	8	—	—	—	—	—
2016–17	Saryarka Karagandy	VHL	33	2	11	13	16	8	1	2	3	0
2016–17	HC Temirtau	KAZ	4	0	0	0	6	12	0	2	2	0
2017–18	Beibarys Atyrau	KAZ	14	2	7	9	2	—	—	—	—	—
2017–18	Arlan Kokshetau	KAZ	17	3	4	7	6	14	1	4	5	2
RUS.2 totals			162	32	54	86	146	22	7	2	9	10
KAZ totals			182	58	57	115	134	37	4	11	15	10
VHL totals			169	29	40	69	128	43	4	9	13	28

=== International ===
Year	Team	Event	GP	G	A	Pts	PIM
2003	Kazakhstan	WJC D1	5	1	2	3	4
2009	Kazakhstan	OGQ	3	1	4	5	4
Senior totals			3	1	4	5	4
