= Anton Kazantsev =

Kazakhstani ice hockey player

- Born: August 26, 1986 (age 38); Rudny, Kazakhstan
- Height: 6 ft 2 in (188 cm)
- Weight: 192 lb (87 kg; 13 st 10 lb)
- Position: Defenceman
- Shoots: Left
- VHL team Former teams: Yermak Angarsk; Barys Astana (KHL); Sokol Krasnoyarsk (VHL); Saryarka Karagandy (VHL)
- National team: Kazakhstan
- NHL draft: Undrafted
- Playing career: 2007–present

Anton Kazantsev (born August 26, 1986) is a Kazakhstani professional ice hockey defenceman. He is currently playing with the Yermak Angarsk of the Supreme Hockey League (VHL). Kazantsev previously played for Barys Astana of the Kontinental Hockey League (KHL).

== International ==
He participated at the 2010 IIHF World Championship as a member of the Kazakhstan men's national ice hockey team.

Kazantsev was named to the Kazakhstan men's national ice hockey team for competition at the 2014 IIHF World Championship.

== Career statistics ==
			Regular season					Playoffs
Season	Team	League	GP	G	A	Pts	PIM	GP	G	A	Pts	PIM
2003–04	HC Sibir Novosibirsk-2	Russia3	3	0	0	0	0	—	—	—	—	—
2004–05	HC Sibir Novosibirsk-2	Russia3	53	3	2	5	36	—	—	—	—	—
2005–06	HC Sibir Novosibirsk-2	Russia3	57	1	0	1	30	—	—	—	—	—
2006–07	HC Sibir Novosibirsk-2	Russia3	44	4	3	7	68	—	—	—	—	—
2007–08	Barys Astana	Russia2	51	0	7	7	120	7	1	2	3	4
2008–09	Saryarka Karagandy	Russia2	8	1	0	1	8	—	—	—	—	—
2008–09	Barys Astana	KHL	10	0	0	0	62	1	0	0	0	0
2009–10	Barys Astana	KHL	18	0	0	0	31	—	—	—	—	—
2009–10	Barys Astana-2	Kazakhstan	15	3	4	7	32	—	—	—	—	—
2010–11	Barys Astana	KHL	4	0	0	0	0	—	—	—	—	—
2010–11	Barys Astana-2	Kazakhstan	43	4	21	25	63	15	0	2	2	10
2011–12	Sokol Krasnoyarsk	VHL	39	4	5	9	40	—	—	—	—	—
2011–12	HK Astana	Kazakhstan	1	0	0	0	0	—	—	—	—	—
2012–13	Yermak Angarsk	VHL	48	3	5	8	57	2	1	0	1	0
2013–14	Yermak Angarsk	VHL	46	6	8	14	34	—	—	—	—	—
2014–15	Yermak Angarsk	VHL	28	1	3	4	8	—	—	—	—	—
2014–15	HK Almaty	Kazakhstan	6	1	0	1	4	7	1	0	1	2
2015–16	Arlan Kokshetau	Kazakhstan	50	5	6	11	14	16	0	2	2	4
2016–17	Arlan Kokshetau	Kazakhstan	44	5	11	16	6	10	1	0	1	6
2017–18	Arlan Kokshetau	Kazakhstan	45	6	3	9	20	10	0	2	2	2
2018–18	Arlan Kokshetau	Kazakhstan	42	6	11	17	22	13	2	2	4	2
2019–20	Arlan Kokshetau	Kazakhstan	57	9	8	17	26	—	—	—	—	—
2020–21	Arlan Kokshetau	Kazakhstan	26	0	3	3	6	—	—	—	—	—
2020–21	HK Aktobe	Kazakhstan	16	0	0	0	16	—	—	—	—	—
KHL totals			32	0	0	0	93	1	0	0	0	0
Kazakhstan totals			345	39	67	106	209	71	4	8	12	26
