= Alexander Tatarinov =

Russian ice hockey player

- Born: 14 April 1982 (age 44) Yekaterinburg, USSR
- Height: 5 ft 11 in (180 cm)
- Weight: 216 lb (98 kg; 15 st 6 lb)
- Position: Left wing
- Shot: Left
- KHL team: Metallurg Novokuznetsk
- NHL draft: 53rd overall, 2000; Phoenix Coyotes
- Playing career: 1998–2017

Alexander Vasilevich Tatarinov (Russian: Александр Васильевич Татаринов; born 14 April 1982) is a Russian professional ice hockey winger who currently plays for Metallurg Novokuznetsk of the Kontinental Hockey League (KHL).

== Career statistics ==
=== Regular season and playoffs ===
			Regular season					Playoffs
Season	Team	League	GP	G	A	Pts	PIM	GP	G	A	Pts	PIM
1998–99	Spartak Moscow	RSL	2	0	0	0	0	—	—	—	—	—
1999–2000	Torpedo–2 Yaroslavl	RUS.3	32	11	10	21	89	—	—	—	—	—
2000–01	Lokomotiv Yaroslavl	RSL	2	1	0	1	0	1	0	0	0	0
2000–01	Lokomotiv–2 Yaroslavl	RUS.3	13	7	9	16	8	—	—	—	—	—
2000–01	Kristall Saratov	RUS.2	24	3	3	6	8	—	—	—	—	—
2001–02	Lokomotiv Yaroslavl	RSL	53	4	3	7	8	—	—	—	—	—
2001–02	Lokomotiv–2 Yaroslavl	RUS.3	5	4	2	6	12	—	—	—	—	—
2001–02	Amur Khabarovsk	RSL	10	0	0	0	0	—	—	—	—	—
2002–03	Molot–Prikamye Perm	RSL	31	6	5	11	16	—	—	—	—	—
2002–03	Molot–Prikamye–2 Perm	RUS.3	9	4	7	11	2	—	—	—	—	—
2003–04	Spartak Moscow	RUS.2	43	8	11	19	14	9	2	5	7	2
2003–04	Spartak–2 Moscow	RUS.3	6	4	2	6	10	—	—	—	—	—
2004–05	Mechel Chelyabinsk	RUS.2	44	7	17	24	32	7	0	1	1	0
2004–05	Mechel–2 Chelyabinsk	RUS.3	1	0	0	0	0	—	—	—	—	—
2005–06	Khimik Voskresensk	RUS.2	19	1	3	4	10	—	—	—	—	—
2005–06	Khimik–2 Voskresensk	RUS.3	4	2	1	3	0	—	—	—	—	—
2005–06	Metallurg Novokuznetsk	RSL	16	1	2	3	12	3	1	0	1	2
2005–06	Metallurg–2 Novokuznetsk	RUS.3	1	1	0	1	2	—	—	—	—	—
2006–07	Metallurg Novokuznetsk	RSL	49	6	7	13	38	3	0	0	0	2
2007–08	Metallurg Novokuznetsk	RSL	30	1	1	2	22	—	—	—	—	—
2007–08	Metallurg–2 Novokuznetsk	RUS.3	1	1	0	1	0	—	—	—	—	—
2008–09	Metallurg Novokuznetsk	KHL	48	5	5	10	42	—	—	—	—	—
2009–10	Metallurg Novokuznetsk	KHL	54	6	6	12	16	—	—	—	—	—
2009–10	Dizel Penza	RUS.2	2	1	2	3	4	—	—	—	—	—
2010–11	Avtomobilist Yekaterinburg	KHL	38	3	5	8	37	—	—	—	—	—
2011–12	Avtomobilist Yekaterinburg	KHL	2	0	0	0	0	—	—	—	—	—
2011–12	Donbass Donetsk	VHL	24	0	2	2	10	4	0	0	0	2
2012–13	Molot–Prikamye Perm	VHL	31	4	2	6	14	—	—	—	—	—
2013–14	HC Almaty	KAZ	42	11	12	23	32	—	—	—	—	—
2014–15	HC Almaty	KAZ	48	12	16	28	12	7	4	1	5	6
2015–16	HC Almaty	KAZ	51	13	15	28	58	3	0	0	0	0
2016–17	HC Almaty	KAZ	53	3	10	13	12	4	0	0	0	2
RSL totals			193	19	18	37	96	7	1	0	1	4
RUS.2 & VHL totals			187	24	40	64	92	20	2	6	8	4
KHL totals			142	14	16	30	95	—	—	—	—	—

=== International ===
Year	Team	Event	GP	G	A	Pts	PIM
2000	Russia	WJC18	6	3	2	5	4
Junior totals			6	3	2	5	4
