= List of the Mahabharata tribes =

The Sanskrit epic Mahabharata contains several enumeration of tribes or clans, which were categorized among the ancient tribes (Janapada) and clans (Kula), with various kingdoms.

The earliest terms used "clan" or "tribe" in Vedic Sanskrit were jana and vis. Heinrich Zimmer regarded the word vis to denote a social structure identical with the English "tribe", and different from a grama which, he considered, represented a "clan"—midway between "family" (kula) and tribe. AC Das believed, on the other hand, that: an aggregation of Vedic families formed a gotra; a group of gotras constituted a gosthi; and a group of gosthis became a grama. A vis comprised a number of these gramas and denotes a territorial "district". In Das' opinion, jana more properly designates a tribe, which was an association of neighbouring districts.

Broadly, there are four principal lists in Mahabharata:

1. Comprising respectively the tribes defeated by Yudhishthira's four brothers (Sabha Parva, Book 2 Chapters: 23-29.
2. Tribes bringing gifts at Yudhishthira's consecration as king emperor Sabha Parva, Book 2 Chapters: 45-48.
3. Tribes mentioned in the 'geography' in Bhishma Parva, Book 6 Chapter: X.
4. Kings and warriors of various tribes, who came to the ceremony for investing Kartikeya with the status of generalissimo: Shalya Parva, Book IX Chapter; 44.

== Janas ==
There were various Janas (tribes) during the Mahabharatas, mentioned in the Kurukshetra War with their current locations in Modern India. The texts provides mentions of around 230 Janapadas, arising from the Janas and many of these tribes were mentioned in the Rigveda. The prominent among them includes the following:

- Ambashtha
- Anga
- Avanti
- Chedi
- Chera
- Chola
- Daradas
- Gandhara
- Hara Huna
- Huna
- Kalinga
- Kamboja
- Kāśī
- Kekaya
- Kuru
- Panchala
- Pandya
- Pragjyotisha
- Puru
- Magadha
- Matsya
- Sindhu
- Trigarta
- Vanga
- Vatsa
