= Hun (disambiguation) =

A Hun is a member of the Huns, a confederation of nomadic tribes in Western Asia and Europe in late antiquity.

Hun or huns may also refer to:

== Arts and entertainment ==
- Hun, a British subcultural stereotype, see Hun subculture
- Hun, a character in Teenage Mutant Ninja Turtles
- The Hun (cartoonist), a pseudonymous erotic artist
- The Huns (film) a 1960 Italian film
- Hun (album), 2026 studio album by The Hu
- Hun (instrument), a clay Korean flute

== Biology ==
- Hun, a nickname for Hungarian partridge
- Hun shrew, (Crocidura attila), a mammal species found in parts of Africa

== Geography ==
- Húns, a village in Friesland, Netherlands
- River Hun, Norfolk, England
- Hun River (Liao River tributary), Liaoning Province, China
- Hun River (Yalu River tributary), China
- Hun, Iran, a village in Hormozgan Province
- Hun, Libya, a town
- HUN, Chapman code for Huntingdonshire, county in England
- HUN, the ISO 3166-1 alpha-3 code for Hungary

== History ==
- The Xiongnu, a confederation of nomadic tribes in northeast Asia from the 3rd Century BCE to the late 1st Century CE
- The Hunas, "Iranian Huns" and/or Xionites: tribes in Asia between the 4th and 7th Centuries
  - "Red Huns", who were possibly synonymous with the "Alchon Huns" and/or Kidarites;
  - "Alchon Huns"
  - "White Huns", possibly synonymous with, or included the Hephthalites
  - "Nezak Huns"
- North Caucasian Huns, Daghestan, a people who settled in Daghestan during the 6th and 7th centuries
- Hun of East Anglia, 8th century ruler
- Hun soul, in Chinese folk beliefs
- Huntingdale railway station, Melbourne

== Transportation ==
- Hualien Airport's IATA airport code
- Railway service timetable code for Hunter Line, New South Wales, Australia
- Huntingdon railway station's National Rail station code
- Huntington station (Amtrak)'s station code

== Other uses ==
- Hun Sen (born 1952), current president of the Senate and former prime minister of Cambodia
- Hun Manet (born 1977), current prime minister of Cambodia, son of Hun Sen
- Hun School of Princeton, New Jersey, United States
- F-100 Super Sabre nickname
- Hun (pejorative), a derogatory term used for Germans
- Hun, an insult used for Rangers F.C. supporters
- HUN, an ISO country code for Hungary
- Huntsman Corporation, NYSE symbol
- Hun, means Human in Mongolian.
- The Hun, a nickname for the newspaper Herald Sun

== See also ==
- Huna (disambiguation)
- Hunnic (disambiguation)
- Hunni
