= Patrik Svitana =

Slovak professional ice hockey player (born 1988)

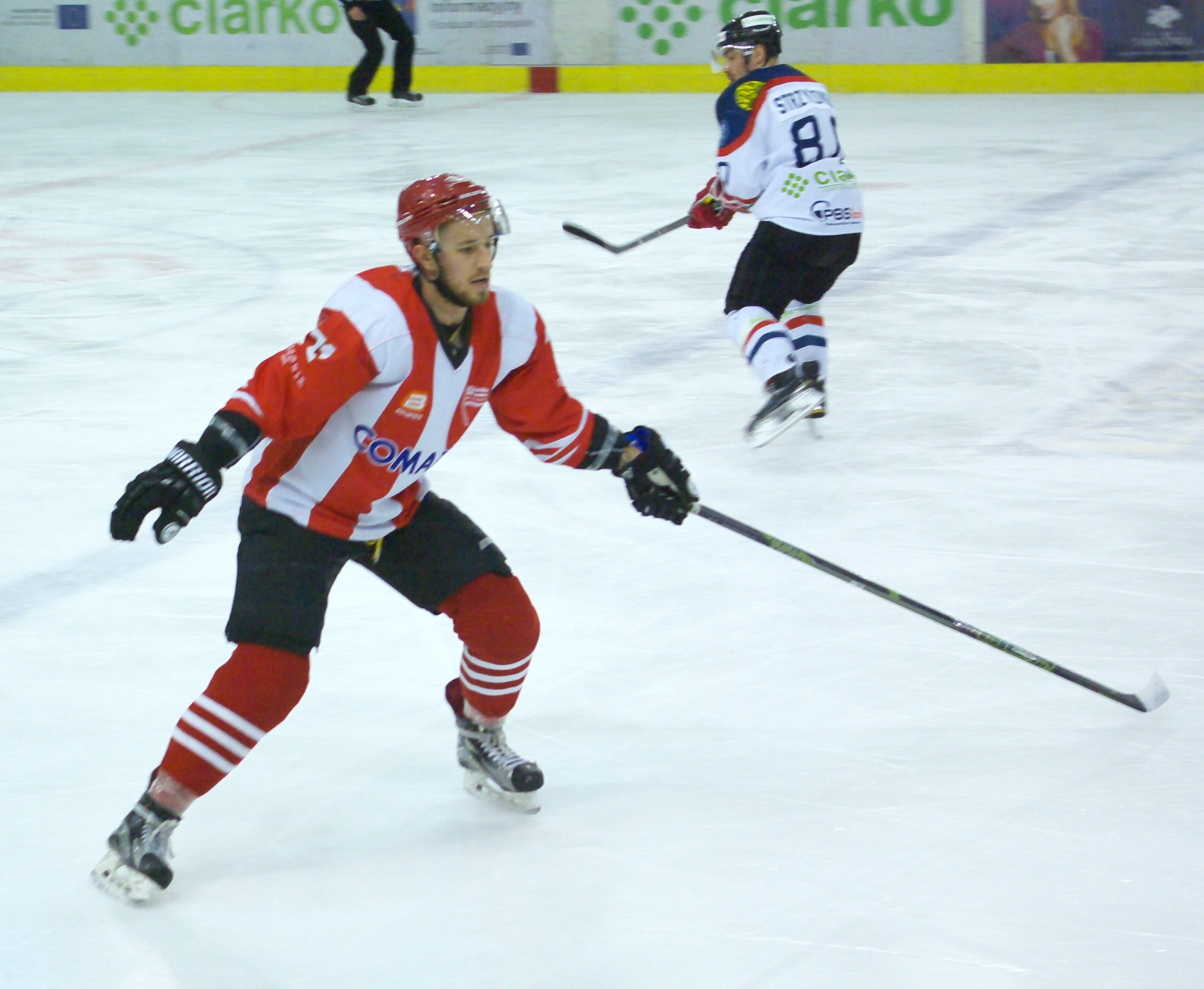
- Born: 10 July 1988 (age 36); Poprad, Czechoslovakia
- Height: 5 ft 11 in (180 cm)
- Weight: 178 lb (81 kg; 12 st 10 lb)
- Position: Right wing
- Shoots: Right
- Slovak team Former teams: HK Dukla Michalovce; HK Poprad; MHK Kežmarok; HC Košice; Yertis Pavlodar; KS Cracovia
- National team: Slovakia
- NHL draft: Undrafted
- Playing career: 2006–present

Patrik Svitana (born 10 July 1988) is a Slovak professional ice hockey player who is currently playing for the HK Dukla Michalovce in the Slovak Extraliga.

== Career ==
He formerly played in the Polska Hokej Liga with the KS Cracovia.

== Career statistics ==
=== Regular season and playoffs ===
Bold indicates led league

			Regular season					Playoffs
Season	Team	League	GP	G	A	Pts	PIM	GP	G	A	Pts	PIM
2004–05	HK Poprad	Slovak U18	17	3	9	12	16	—	—	—	—	—
2005–06	HK Poprad	Slovak U18	47	24	30	54	54	—	—	—	—	—
2005–06	HK Poprad	Slovak-Jr.	7	0	1	1	2	5	1	1	2	2
2006–07	HK Poprad	Slovak-Jr.	39	15	24	39	36	—	—	—	—	—
2006–07	HK Poprad	Slovak	15	1	2	3	2	6	0	0	0	0
2007–08	HK Poprad	Slovak-Jr.	40	25	30	55	103	—	—	—	—	—
2007–08	HK Poprad	Slovak	30	0	0	0	10	4	0	0	0	2
2008–09	MHK Kežmarok	Slovak-Jr.1	15	18	22	40	14	—	—	—	—	—
2008–09	MHK Kežmarok	Slovak	46	7	11	18	12	—	—	—	—	—
2009–10	HK Poprad	Slovak	35	5	5	10	12	5	0	1	1	12
2009–10	MHK Kežmarok	Slovak.1	16	11	20	31	10	1	0	1	1	2
2010–11	HK Poprad	Slovak	55	5	14	19	18	18	4	2	6	10
2011–12	HK Poprad	Slovak	45	10	18	28	8	6	1	3	4	2
2012–13	HC Košice	Slovak	55	7	24	31	36	16	1	1	2	6
2013–14	Yertis Pavlodar	Kazakh	45	8	24	32	14	12	3	9	12	0
2014–15	Yertis Pavlodar	Kazakh	40	15	26	41	18	16	5	7	12	12
2015–16	KS Cracovia	PHL	34	15	22	37	30	17	4	**13**	17	6
2016–17	KS Cracovia	PHL	27	11	12	23	30	—	—	—	—	—
2016–17	HK Poprad	Slovak	20	11	8	19	10	3	1	0	1	0
2017–18	HK Poprad	Slovak	55	23	31	54	24	4	0	3	3	14
2018–19	HK Poprad	Slovak	56	19	33	52	16	12	2	6	8	4
2019–20	HK Poprad	Slovak	52	15	28	43	16	—	—	—	—	—
2020–21	HK Poprad	Slovak	49	20	36	56	22	13	0	11	11	2
2021–22	HK Poprad	Slovak	49	16	39	55	16	7	2	4	6	6
2022–23	HK Poprad	Slovak	48	12	29	41	6	3	0	0	0	0
2023–24	HK Poprad	Slovak	49	7	22	29	12	6	0	1	1	0
Slovak totals			659	158	300	458	220	103	11	32	43	58

=== International ===
Year	Team	Event	Result	GP	G	A	Pts	PIM
2018	Slovakia	WC	9th	7	0	3	3	0
Senior totals				7	0	3	3	0
