= Kirill Sidorenko (disambiguation) =

Kirill Sidorenko may refer to:

- Kirill Sidorenko (born 1983), Russian ice hockey player
- Kyrylo Sydorenko (born 1985), Ukrainian footballer
- Kiryl Sidarenka (born 1995), Belarusian footballer
