= Eldar Abdulayev =

Kazakhstani ice hockey player

- Born: January 20, 1985 (age 40); Ust-Kamenogorsk, Kazakh SSR, Soviet Union
- Height: 6 ft 0 in (183 cm)
- Weight: 174 lb (79 kg; 12 st 6 lb)
- Position: Forward
- Shoots: Left
- KAZ team Former teams: HC Astana; Kazzinc-Torpedo; Yertis Pavlodar; HC Almaty
- Playing career: 2002–present

Eldar Rasimovich Abdulayev (Russian: Эльдар Расимович Абдулаев; born January 20, 1985) is a Kazakhstani professional ice hockey forward currently playing for HC Astana in the Kazakhstan Hockey Championship. He was a member of the Kazakhstan men's national junior ice hockey team at the 2005 World Junior Ice Hockey Championships.
