= Stelmakh =

Stelmakh (Ukrainian: Стельмах) is a gender-neutral Ukrainian surname that may refer to the following notable people:

- Andrei Stelmakh (born 1990), Russian ice hockey goaltender
- Grigory Stelmakh (1900–1942), Soviet military commander
- Iryna Stelmakh (born 1993), Ukrainian handball player
- Mykhailo Stelmakh (1912–1983), Ukrainian novelist, poet, and playwright
- Mykhailo Stelmakh (footballer) (1966–2025), Ukrainian football player and manager
- Volodymyr Stelmakh (born 1939), Ukrainian banker, economist and politician
- Radomyr Stelmakh (born 2005), Ukrainian artistic gymnast
