= Vladimir Markelov =

Vladimir Markelov may refer to:

- Vladimir Markelov (ice hockey) (born 1987), Russian ice hockey forward
- Vladimir Markelov (gymnast) (1957–2023), Russian gymnast
