= Maxime Moisand =

French ice hockey player

- Born: June 11, 1990 (age 35) Grenoble, France
- Height: 5 ft 10 in (178 cm)
- Weight: 172 lb (78 kg; 12 st 4 lb)
- Position: Defence
- Shoots: Right
- Ligue Magnus team Former teams: Boxers de Bordeaux; Brûleurs de Loups; Odense Bulldogs; HC Astana; Ritten Sport; Dauphins d'Épinal
- National team: France
- NHL draft: Undrafted
- Playing career: 2008–present

Maxime Moisand (born June 11, 1990) is a French professional ice hockey defenceman. He currently plays for Boxers de Bordeaux in the Ligue Magnus.

== Playing career ==
=== Clubs play ===
The beginning

Maxime Moisand discovered ice hockey as a little boy thanks to Laurent Meunier. The sport had quickly caught his attention and he joined the club of Grenoble at the age of 4 and a half. At that time he was one of the rare players to come back to the defensive zone. During the 2005/2006 season, he started to play in the Grenoble's U18 team. His presence in the roster lasted 3 seasons. In 2007, he became alternate captain of the team. He scored 6 goals and had 15 assists. Such a result made him the 4th best scorer of his team after the forwards Raphael Papa, Elie Raibon and Nicolas Arrossamena. Playing in the U18 team, Maxime Moisand had already started participating in the U22 games. 2006/2007 was his first season with the under 22 team when aged only 16, Moisand had played 6 games and succeeded in assisting 4 goals. Little by little, his presence in the roster will be more and more significant. In 2008, for instance, he played 14 games. During his 5 seasons with the U22 Grenoble's team, he reached 4 times the podium of the French U22 ice hockey championship and won one bronze, two silver and one gold.

Les Brûleurs de Loups

After a promising junior 2007/2008 season, Moisand (18) joined the professional squad. He played 19 games and scored one goal but what is most important, he participated in the Bruleurs' historic season when the team won 4 national trophies: Le Match des Champions, La coupe de France, La coupe de la Ligue and la Coupe Magnus.

The 2009/2010 season was a season of confirmation for the young Grenoble's defenceman. He played 18 games and had 2 assists. In the 18th day of the Ligue Magnus, he was chosen the best player of his team at a game against Mont-Blanc. He had to skip the last 3 games of the season because of a strain. He managed to come back to the line-up for the play-offs where he assisted one goal, scoring his first play-off point.

The next season started badly for the young defenceman. Since the 3rd game of Ligue Magnus, Moisand got his adductors injured. He didn't play the next 3 games. Maxime recovered by day 7 when Grenoble played Caen and scored in that game his only goal of the season. Sadly, the injuries didn't leave Moisand in peace. He sprained his knee when Grenoble played Amiens (day 17) which made him out for the 5 following games. A quick recovery allowed him to play before at the end of the season and in the last day but one Moisand was chosen the best player of his team in the game against Angers.

The continuation in Danemark

On April 5, 2011, the website of Bruleurs de Loups announced that Maxime Moisand's contract will not be resigned. The number 22 had decided to seize the opportunity to go aboard in order to become a better hockey player and discover the top-level performances. On June 4 he signed with Odense Bulldogs.

=== International play ===
Maxime Moisand regularly played in the French national junior team and had represented his country many times in junior world championship. In summer 2010, because of Benoit Quessandier's injury, he joined the senior squad for the friendly games between France and Poland. He played the 2 games and left a good impression on the coaches. Then, he was called to play against Switzerland. It was a special game for the young defenceman: it took place at Pole Sud, Bruleurs' home ice, and it was the first time that Maxime was a titular member of the team. 4 days later, he scored his first goal at the international level. The staff chose him to prepare the 2011 IIHF World Championship. Moisand played all the preparation games in which France faced Italy, Slovenia and Canada. The young defenceman passed the final selection and went to Slovakia. He was present in 4 games out of 6 because of his adductors injury. His participation was globally satisfactory. With a total ice time of 39min 07 sec he did 68 shifts and had 2 shots on the net.

== Trophies and awards ==
With the U22

- France U22 Bronze Medal 2007/2008
- France U22 Silver Medal 2008/2009
- France U22 Gold Medal 2009/2010
- France U22 Silver Medal 2010/ 2011

With Brûleurs de Loups

- Ligue Magnus, Coupe de la Ligue, Coupe de France, Match des Champions 2009
- Best Player : Match Grenoble – Mont-Blanc (18th day of the Ligue Magnus 2009–10)
- Coupe de la Ligue 2011
- Best Player : Match Grenoble – Angers (25th day of the Ligue Magnus 2010–11)

International level

- U18 WJC D2|A Gold Medal 2007-2008
- U20 WJC D1|A Bronze Medal 2008-2009

== Career statistics ==
			Regular season					Playoffs
Season	Team	League	GP	G	A	Pts	PIM	GP	G	A	Pts	PIM
2005–2006	Grenoble U18	France U18	5	0	0	0	0	-	-	-	-	-
2006–2007	Grenoble U18	France U18	13	2	6	8	10	1	0	0	0	2
2006–2007	Grenoble U22	France U22	6	0	4	4	2	-	-	-	-	-
2007–2008	Grenoble U18 'A'	France U18	16	6	15	21	42	-	-	-	-	-
2007–2008	Grenoble U22	France U22	8	2	0	2	8	2	0	1	1	0
U18 WJC 2007	France U18	U18 WJC D2	5	0	5	5	2	-	-	-	-	-
2008–2009	Grenoble U22	France U22	14	2	6	8	26	2	0	2	2	2
2008–2009	Brûleurs de Loups	Ligue Magnus	19	1	0	1	2	11	0	0	0	0
U20 WJC 2008	France U20	U20 WJC D1	5	0	3	3	0	-	-	-	-	-
2009–2010	Grenoble U22	France U22	9	1	5	6	6	4	1	1	2	38
2009–2010	Brûleurs de Loups	Ligue Magnus	18	0	2	2	6	9	0	1	1	4
U20 WJC 2009	France U20	U20 WJC D1	5	0	1	1	0	-	-	-	-	-
2010–2011	Grenoble U22	France U22	4	1	4	5	6	2	0	2	2	2
2010–2011	Brûleurs de Loups	Ligue Magnus	16	1	3	4	4	2	0	0	0	0
2011 IIHF World Championship	France	World Championship	4	0	0	0	0	-	-	-	-	-
