= Sergei Stupin =

Russian ice hockey player (born 1979)

- Born: September 14, 1979 (age 47) Sverdlovsk, Russian SFSR, Soviet Union
- Height: 6 ft 0 in (183 cm)
- Weight: 190 lb (86 kg; 13 st 8 lb)
- Position: Defence
- Shot: Left
- Played for: Avtomobilist Yekaterinburg
- NHL draft: Undrafted
- Playing career: 2000–2016

Sergei Stupin (born September 14, 1979) is a former Russian professional ice hockey defenceman who played for Avtomobilist Yekaterinburg of the Kontinental Hockey League (KHL).

== Career statistics ==
			Regular season					Playoffs
Season	Team	League	GP	G	A	Pts	PIM	GP	G	A	Pts	PIM
1995–96	Avtomobilist Yekaterinburg-2	Russia2	7	0	1	1	2	—	—	—	—	—
1996–97	Avtomobilist Yekaterinburg-2	Russia3	26	1	4	5	10	—	—	—	—	—
1997–98	Dinamo-Energija Yekaterinburg-2	Russia3	26	1	4	5	32	—	—	—	—	—
1997–98	RTI Yekaterinburg	Russia4	7	0	1	1	8	—	—	—	—	—
1997–98	Kedr Novouralsk	Russia2	—	—	—	—	—	—	—	—	—	—
1998–99	Dinamo-Energija Yekaterinburg-2	Russia3	37	5	8	13	32	—	—	—	—	—
1999–00	Kedr Novouralsk	Russia2	9	0	0	0	0	—	—	—	—	—
1999–00	Dinamo-Energija Yekaterinburg-2	Russia3	3	0	1	1	0	—	—	—	—	—
2000–01	Dinamo-Energija Yekaterinburg-2	Russia3	1	0	0	0	2	—	—	—	—	—
2000–01	Gazovik Tyumen	Russia3	8	0	1	1	4	—	—	—	—	—
2000–01	Kedr Novouralsk	Russia2	4	0	1	1	0	—	—	—	—	—
2001–02	Kedr Novouralsk	Russia2	42	5	5	10	34	—	—	—	—	—
2001–02	RTI Yekaterinburg	Russia4	8	2	2	4	4	—	—	—	—	—
2002–03	Kedr Novouralsk	Russia2	49	2	15	17	40	—	—	—	—	—
2002–03	Kedr Novouralsk-2	Russia4	1	0	1	1	0	—	—	—	—	—
2003–04	Kedr Novouralsk	Russia2	47	4	7	11	30	—	—	—	—	—
2003–04	Kedr Novouralsk-2	Russia4	1	0	3	3	0	—	—	—	—	—
2003–04	HC Neftekhimik Nizhnekamsk-2	Russia3	2	0	1	1	0	—	—	—	—	—
2004–05	Keramin Minsk	Belarus	38	1	9	10	38	14	0	3	3	10
2005–06	Keramin Minsk	Belarus	38	1	11	12	42	3	0	0	0	4
2005–06	Keramin Minsk-2	Belarus Vysshaya	3	0	1	1	2	—	—	—	—	—
2006–07	Sputnik Nizhny Tagil	Russia2	55	7	6	13	60	4	0	1	1	0
2007–08	Sputnik Nizhny Tagil	Russia2	23	2	0	2	18	2	0	0	0	0
2007–08	Sputnik Nizhny Tagil-2	Russia3	4	0	2	2	12	—	—	—	—	—
2008–09	Sputnik Nizhny Tagil	Russia2	54	3	9	12	94	9	0	0	0	22
2009–10	Avtomobilist Yekaterinburg	KHL	43	2	4	6	42	1	0	0	0	0
2010–11	Avtomobilist Yekaterinburg	KHL	33	1	5	6	34	—	—	—	—	—
2010–11	Sputnik Nizhny Tagil	VHL	4	0	0	0	2	4	0	1	1	8
2011–12	Avtomobilist Yekaterinburg	KHL	1	0	0	0	0	—	—	—	—	—
2011–12	Sputnik Nizhny Tagil	VHL	15	0	1	1	4	—	—	—	—	—
2012–13	Avtomobilist Yekaterinburg	KHL	14	0	1	1	2	—	—	—	—	—
2012–13	Burevestnik Ekaterinburg	Russia3	13	2	8	10	10	—	—	—	—	—
2013–14	Saryarka Karagandy	VHL	43	1	6	7	20	2	0	0	0	0
2014–15	Gornyak Rudny	Kazakhstan	52	2	21	23	32	15	2	2	4	12
2015–16	Gornyak Rudny	Kazakhstan	53	5	12	17	76	3	0	0	0	0
KHL totals			91	3	10	13	78	1	0	0	0	0
Belarus totals			76	2	20	22	80	17	0	3	3	14
Kazakhstan totals			105	7	33	40	108	18	2	2	4	12
VHL totals			62	1	7	8	26	6	0	1	1	8
Russia2 totals			290	23	44	67	278	15	0	1	1	22
