= Samuel Mlynarovič =

Slovak ice hockey player

- Born: 23 May 1990 (age 35); Poprad, Czechoslovakia
- Height: 5 ft 9.6 in (177 cm)
- Weight: 172 lb (78 kg; 12 st 4 lb)
- Position: Centre
- Shoots: Right
- team Former teams: Free agent HK Poprad; HK Orange 20; HC Košice; HC 46 Bardejov; Yertis Pavlodar; HC '05 Banská Bystrica; HK Dukla Michalovce; JKH GKS Jastrzębie
- NHL draft: Undrafted
- Playing career: 2008–present

Samuel Mlynarovič (born 23 May 1990) is a Slovak professional ice hockey center. He is currently an unrestricted free agent who most recently played with HK Poprad in the Slovak Extraliga.

== Career ==
He had previously played for HC Košice. In the 2014–15 season became a champion of Kazakhstan with Yertis Pavlodar.

== Career statistics ==
=== Regular season and playoffs ===
			Regular season					Playoffs
Season	Team	League	GP	G	A	Pts	PIM	GP	G	A	Pts	PIM
2004–05	HK Poprad	Slovak U18	3	0	0	0	0	—	—	—	—	—
2005–06	HK Poprad	Slovak U18	42	6	15	21	34	—	—	—	—	—
2006–07	HK Poprad	Slovak U18	18	6	8	14	24	—	—	—	—	—
2006–07	HK Poprad	Slovak-Jr.	46	10	13	23	32	—	—	—	—	—
2007–08	HK Poprad	Slovak U18	9	4	11	15	8	—	—	—	—	—
2007–08	HK Poprad	Slovak-Jr.	47	15	36	51	107	—	—	—	—	—
2008–09	HK Poprad	Slovak-Jr.	32	28	34	62	30	—	—	—	—	—
2008–09	HK Poprad	Slovak	1	0	0	0	0	—	—	—	—	—
2008–09	HK Orange 20	Slovak	10	3	1	4	8	—	—	—	—	—
2009–10	HK Poprad	Slovak-Jr.	0	0	0	0	0	3	4	1	5	0
2009–10	HK Orange 20	Slovak	34	2	10	12	48	—	—	—	—	—
2010–11	HK Poprad	Slovak	55	4	9	13	16	17	1	3	4	52
2011–12	HC Košice	Slovak	48	6	5	11	47	16	3	1	4	6
2011–12	HC 46 Bardejov	Slovak.1	3	3	4	7	0	—	—	—	—	—
2012–13	HC Košice	Slovak	40	7	3	10	10	15	2	1	3	4
2012–13	HC 46 Bardejov	Slovak.1	7	4	4	8	4	—	—	—	—	—
2013–14	HK Poprad	Slovak	56	19	20	39	22	5	1	1	2	6
2014–15	Yertis Pavlodar	Kazakh	41	23	20	43	28	16	7	9	16	10
2015–16	Yertis Pavlodar	Kazakh	32	8	12	20	44	—	—	—	—	—
2016–17	HK Poprad	Slovak	48	10	15	25	42	3	0	1	1	4
2017–18	HK Poprad	Slovak	50	15	19	34	78	4	1	2	3	12
2018–19	HK Poprad	Slovak	53	10	20	30	78	12	5	2	7	27
2019–20	HK Poprad	Slovak	26	3	1	4	47	—	—	—	—	—
2019–20	HC '05 Banská Bystrica	Slovak	24	14	7	21	10	—	—	—	—	—
2020–21	HK Dukla Michalovce	Slovak	9	0	3	3	4	—	—	—	—	—
2020–21	HC '05 Banská Bystrica	Slovak	32	3	8	11	32	4	1	1	2	2
2021–22	JKH GKS Jastrzębie	Polska	16	3	4	7	33	—	—	—	—	—
2021–22	HK Poprad	Slovak	34	7	4	11	16	7	0	3	3	0
2022–23	HK Poprad	Slovak	48	17	11	28	45	3	1	0	1	0
2023–24	HK Poprad	Slovak	34	5	7	12	96	6	0	0	0	2
2024–25	HK Poprad	Slovak	41	2	3	5	8	6	1	1	2	4
Slovak totals			643	127	146	273	607	98	16	16	32	119

=== International ===
Year	Team	Event	Result	GP	G	A	Pts	PIM
2010	Slovakia	WJC	8th	6	1	1	2	4
Junior totals				6	1	1	2	4
