= Andrei Stelmakh =

Russian ice hockey player

- Born: March 15, 1990 (age 35) Khabarovsk, Russia
- Height: 5 ft 10 in (178 cm)
- Weight: 170 lb (77 kg; 12 st 2 lb)
- Position: Goaltender
- Catches: Left
- AHIL team Former teams: PSK Sakhalin; HC Almaty; Admiral Vladivostok
- NHL draft: Undrafted
- Playing career: 2012–present

Andrei Stelmakh (born March 15, 1990) is a Russian professional ice hockey goaltender. He is currently playing with PSK Sakhalin of the Asia League Ice Hockey (ALIH).

Stelmakh made his professional debut with HC Almaty during the 2012–13 Kazakhstan Hockey Championship season, playing 35 games. He also played one game for Admiral Vladivostok of the Kontinental Hockey League during the 2013–14 KHL season.
