= Nepa kingdom =

Ancient kingdom in Nepal

Nepa (also known as Nipa or Neepa) was a mountainous kingdom mentioned in the ancient Sanskrit epic Mahabharata. Its modern equivalent is identified as the Kingdom of Nepal, a country located in the mountainous terrain of the Himalayas.

== References in Mahabharata ==
=== Nepas and king Yudhishthira ===
Nepas was mentioned as a tribe who was under the sway of the Pandava king Yudhishthira:- The Nipas, the Chitrakas, the Kukkuras, the Karaskaras, and the Lauha-janghas were living in the palace of Yudhishthira like bondsmen (MBh 2:49). Nepas gave tribute to Yudhishthira during his Rajasuya sacrifice:- Numerous Chinas, Sakas, Uddras and many barbarous tribes were living in the woods, while many Vrishnis, Harahunas, and dusky tribes of the Himavat, and many Nipas were residing in regions on the sea-coast, waiting with tributes at the gate (of king Yudhishthira) (2:5).

=== Bhima's list of kings ===
The Nepa king is mentioned in a list of kings whose acts lead to the destruction of their own race, much like in the case of Duryodhana, whose acts lead to the destruction of the Kuru race.

When Dharma became extinct, Kali was born in the race of Asuras flourishing with prosperity and blazing with energy. So was Udavarta born among the Haihayas, Janamejaya among the Nepas, Vahula among the Talajanghas, proud Vasu among the Krimis, Ajavindu among the Suviras, Rushardhik among the Surashtras, Arkaja among the Valihas, Dhautamulaka among the Chinas, Hayagriva among the Videhas, Varayu among the Mahaujasas, Vahu among the Sundaras, Pururavas among the Diptakshas, Sahaja among the Chedis and Matsyas and Vrishaddhaja among the Praviras, Dharana among the Chandra-batsyas, Bigahana among the Mukutas and Sama among the Nandivegas (5:74).

=== Other References ===
At (13:34) we found the following passage where Nepas are mentioned as Nipas:- The Bhrigus conquered the Talajanghas. The son of Angiras conquered the Nipas. Bharadwaja conquered the Vitahavyas as well as the Ailas.

== See also ==
- Kingdoms of Ancient India
