= Alexei Ivanov (ice hockey, born 1988) =

Kazakhstani ice hockey player

- Born: 4 May 1988 (age 37) Omsk, Russian SFSR, Soviet Union
- Height: 6 ft 0 in (183 cm)
- Weight: 185 lb (84 kg; 13 st 3 lb)
- Position: Goaltender
- Shoots: Left
- UAE team Former teams: Al Ain Theebs; Yuzhny Ural Orsk; Saryarka Karagandy; HC Astana; Yermak Angarsk; Spartak Moscow; Barys Astana; HK Poprad; Daemyung Killer Whales
- National team: Kazakhstan
- NHL draft: Undrafted
- Playing career: 2009–present

Alexei Sergeyevich Ivanov (Russian: Алексей Серге́евич Иванов) (born 4 May 1988) is a Russiani professional ice hockey goaltender. He currently plays with Al Ain Theebs in the United Arab Emirates.

== International ==
Ivanov was named to the Kazakhstan men's national ice hockey team for competition at the 2014 IIHF World Championship.
