= Andrei Makrov =

Estonian ice hockey player

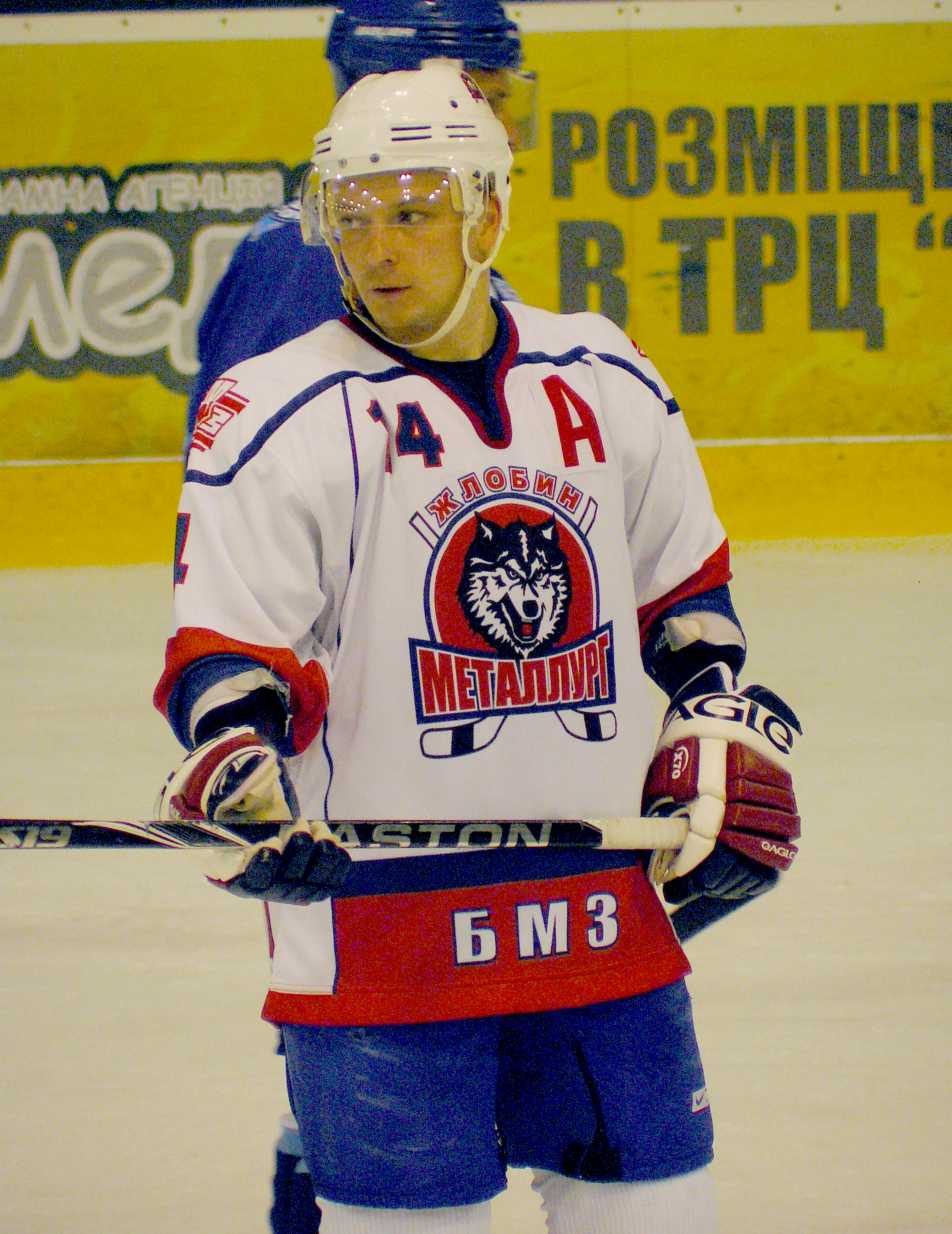
- Makrov in 2010
- Born: 14 December 1979 (age 46) Tallinn, then part of Estonian SSR, Soviet Union
- Height: 1.76 m (5 ft 9 in)
- Weight: 88 kg (194 lb; 13 st 12 lb)
- Position: Right wing
- Shoots: Right
- EML team Former teams: HC Viking; FPS; Molot-Prikamye Perm; Neftyanik Leninogorsk; Neftyanik Almetyevsk; Torpedo Nizhny Novgorod; Dmitrov; Yunost Minsk; Dinamo Minsk; Gomel; Jesenice; Metallurg Zhlobin; Neman Grodno; Buran Voronezh; VMF-Kareliya Kondopoga; Varberg HK; Arystan Temirtau; Gornyak Rudny; Almaty; Telford Tigers; GKS Tychy
- National team: Estonia
- Playing career: 1999–present

Andrei Makrov (born 14 December 1979) is an Estonian professional ice hockey player who plays for HC Viking of the Meistriliiga (EML).

Internationally, Makrov has represented Estonia and is the team's all-time goal-scoring and points leader in the World Championships.
