= Hara Huna kingdom =

Ancient kingdom inhabited by the Hara Huna tribe

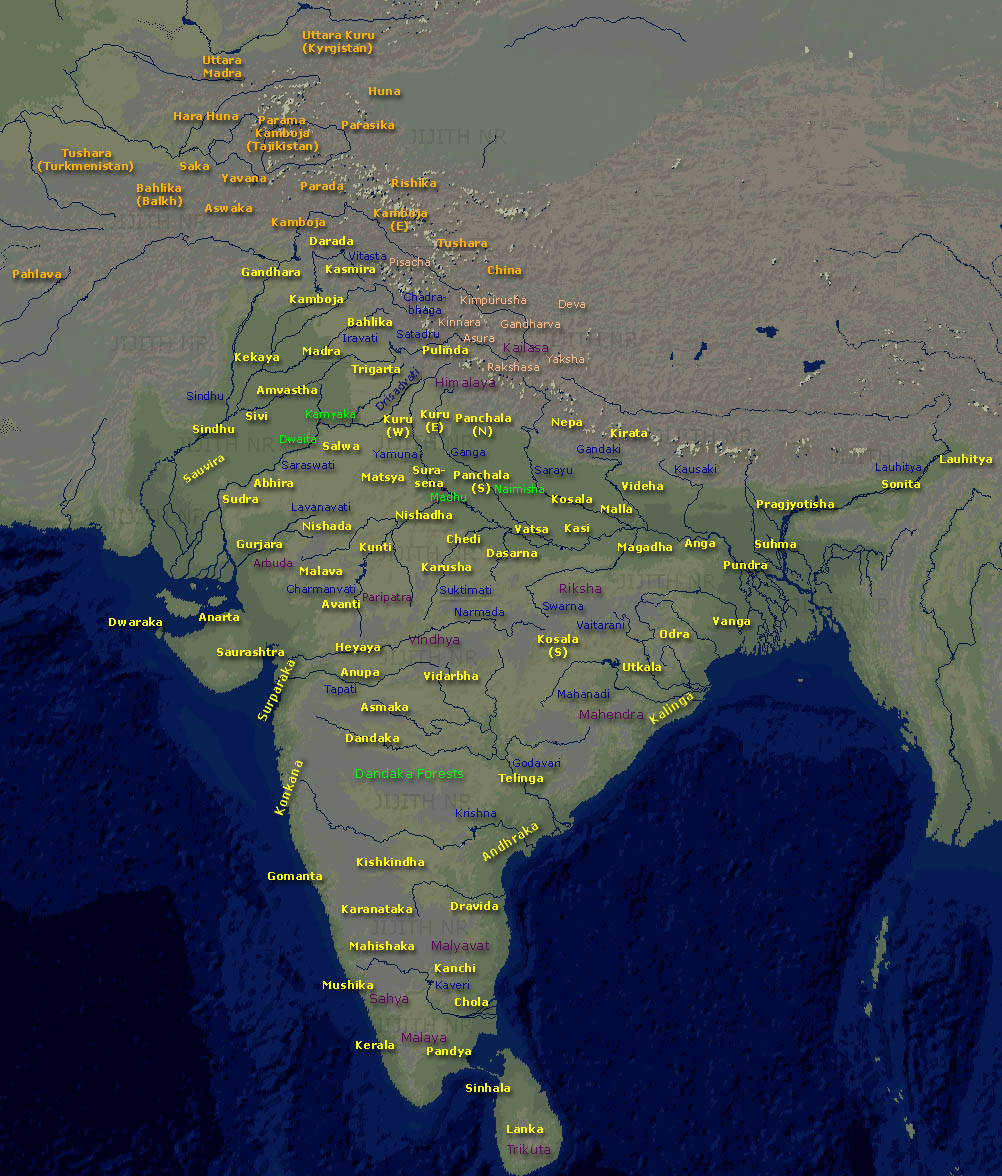
- Hara Huna kingdom alongside other locations of kingdoms and republics mentioned in the Indian epics or Bharata Khanda
- Government: Monarchy
- Today part of: Tajikistan; Uzbekistan; Kyrgyzstan; China

Hara-Huna (White Huns) was an ancient kingdom and inhabited by the Hara Hunas tribe close to the Himalayas who had limited interaction with the Indian kingdoms, thus they were identified in the epic Mahabharata.

They lived in the Xinjiang province of China, east of Kashmir. However they were nomadic people who changed their settlements time to time.

The Pandava hero Nakula visited this place during his western military campaign for collecting tribute for Yudhishthira's Rajasuya sacrifice. This could be a branch of Hara-Hunas migrated to the west of Ancient India.

== References in the Mahabharata ==
=== Nakula's conquests ===
Nakula, after defeating the mighty Gramaniya that dwelt on the shore of the sea, and the Sudras and the Abhiras that dwelt on the banks of the Sarasvati River, and all those tribes that lived upon fisheries, and those also that dwelt on the mountains, and the whole of the country called after the five rivers (Punjab), and the mountains called Amara, and the country called Uttarayotisha and the city of Divyakutta and the tribe called Dwarapala, by sheer force, reduced to subjection the Ramathas, the Harahunas, and various kings of the west. (2,31)

=== Presence in Yudhishthira's Rajasuya sacrifice ===
Numberless Chinas and Sakas and Uddras and many barbarous tribes living in the woods, and many Vrishnis and Harahunas, and dusky tribes of the Himavat, and many Nipas and people residing in regions on the sea-coast came to the Rajasuya sacrifice performed by Pandava king Yudhishthira. (2,50)

The Vangas and Angas and Paundras and Odras and Cholas and Dravidas and Andhakas, and the chiefs of many islands and countries on the seaboard as also of frontier states, including the rulers of the Sinhalas, the barbarous mlecchas, the natives of Lanka, and all the kings of the West by hundreds, and all the chiefs of the sea-coast, and the kings of the Pahlavas and the Daradas and the various tribes of the Kiratas and Yavanas and Sakras and the Harahunas and Chinas and Tukharas and the Sindhavas and the Jagudas and the Ramathas and the Mundas and the inhabitants of the kingdom of women and the Tanganas and the Kekayas and the Malavas and the inhabitants of Kasmira, waited upon Yudhishthira, performing various offices in his palace. (3,51)

== See also ==
- Kingdoms of Ancient India
- Abhiras
- Huna kingdom
- Huna (disambiguation)
