= Hunnic =

Hunnic may refer to:

- Huns, a former nomadic tribe of the Eurasian steppe
- Hunnic language, spoken by the Huns
- Hunnic grapes, a class of grapes grown in German-speaking countries during the Middle Ages

== See also ==
- Hun (disambiguation)
- Hunnic War (disambiguation)
- Hunno, Alamannic king in 385
