= Marek Pinc =

Czech ice hockey player

- Born: March 20, 1979 (age 45); Most, Czechoslovakia
- Height: 5 ft 9 in (175 cm)
- Weight: 165 lb (75 kg; 11 st 11 lb)
- Position: Goaltender
- Catches: L
- KAZ team Former teams: Yertis Pavlodar; HC Chemopetrol Litvínov; HC Vagnerplast Kladno; HC Vítkovice; HC Liberec
- National team: Czech Republic
- Playing career: 1997–present

Marek Pinc (born March 20, 1979) is a Czech ice hockey player, playing currently for Dundee Stars of the EIHL. He is one of the best goaltenders in the country and has played several seasons for the national team.

== International play ==
Pinc made his full international debut in 2007, playing in the 2007 World Championship as replacement for Roman Čechmánek, and 2008 World Championship. He previously had played for the Czech Republic men's national junior ice hockey team.
