= Pierra Vejjabul =

- Born: Pierra Hoon; 27 November 1909; Lampang, Thailand
- Died: 20 April 1984 (aged 74)
- Education: MD, University of Paris
- Known for: Mother-and-child welfare
- Medical career
- Profession: Physician
- Institutions: Venereal Diseases and Leprosy Control Division, Ministry of Public Health
- Awards: Order of the White Elephant

Pierra Vejjabul (Thai: เพียร เวชบุล, born Pierra Hoon, (Note: Hoontrakul in Thai) 27 November 1898 or 1909 – 20 April 1984 (Note: Sources differ on her birth year; some list it as 1898, while others give 1909.)) was one of the first female physicians of Thailand. She was a pioneer in the field of women's health in Thailand.

== Biography ==
Pierra was born in Lampang, Thailand to Trongkij Hoontrakul, a well-to-do merchant, and Phant Hoontrakul, who was his third wife. She was the youngest child of the family. She was educated in Bangkok at Saovabha and Saint Joseph Convent Schools, and graduated from secondary school in 1925. She then took up a teaching position at Assumption Convent and Saint Joseph Convent Schools.

Inspired to study medicine by a French doctor who helped her mother, upon graduation Pierra had applied for training at the Medical School at Siriraj Hospital, but was rejected as the school did not accept females at the time. At the age of sixteen, against her father's wishes, she left for Saigon, where she studied French for one year with the support of Catholic nuns. She then left for France, where she obtained a medical education at the University of Paris, graduating in 1936 and then returning to practise in Thailand.

She took a position in the Thai Ministry of Public Health's Department of Venereal Diseases. She was a vocal activist on the welfare of prostitutes and their children, an issue ignored by society at large at the time, and dedicated herself to the issue. She founded the Pierra Maternity and Child Welfare Foundation, which under her leadership took over 4,000 abandoned children under its care.

She later adopted the surname Vejjabul, (Note: The meaning of this word is unclear, some sources having "great woman doctor" and others having "complete doctor".) which was granted by Princess Mother Srinagarindra during the premiership of Plaek Pibulsonggram.

== See also ==
- Margaret Lin Xavier, first female Thai physician

== Resources ==
- The Christian herald, v. 87 (1964) , reprinted in: Reader's Digest, v. 85, no. 508, Aug. 1964
