= Hoon (Korean name) =

- Hangul: 훈
- RR: Hun
- MR: Hun

Hoon, also spelled Hun, is a Korean given name. Notable people with the name include:

- Sim Hun (born Sim Daeseop, 1901–1936), Korean novelist
- Isao Harimoto (born Jang Hun, 1940), Zainichi Korean baseball player
- Kim Hoon (born 1948), South Korean novelist
- Suh Hoon (born 1954), South Korean government official
- Chung Hoon (born 1969), South Korean judo practitioner
- Lee Hoon (actor) (born 1973), South Korean actor
- Hoon Lee (born 1973), American actor
- Jang Hoon (born 1975), South Korean film director
- Sung Hoon (singer, born 1980) (born 1980), South Korean singer, member boy band Brown Eyed Soul
- Jung Hoon (born 1985), South Korean football player
- Lee Hun (footballer) (born 1986), South Korean football player

Fictional characters with this name include:

- Jhun Hoon, character in 1990s and 2000s video game series The King of Fighters

== See also ==
- List of Korean given names
