= Vadim Zhelobnyuk =

Russian ice hockey player

- Born: April 22, 1989 (age 35); Moscow, Russian SFSR
- Height: 6 ft 0 in (183 cm)
- Weight: 202 lb (92 kg; 14 st 6 lb)
- Position: Goaltender
- Caught: Left
- Played for: HC Dynamo Moscow
- Playing career: 2007–2017

Vadim Vitalyevich Zhelobnyuk (Russian: Вадим Витальевич Желобнюк; born April 22, 1989) is a Russian former ice hockey goaltender. He played in the Russian Superleague and Kontinental Hockey League for HC Dynamo Moscow.

== Honours ==
- IIHF World U18 Championship: 2007

=== International statistics ===
Year	Team	Event	Place	GP	W	L	T	OT	MIN	GA	SO	GAA	SV%
2007	Russia	WJC18	1st place, gold medalist(s)	7	6	1	0	—	350	19	0	3.26	.890
2009	Russia	WJC	3rd place, bronze medalist(s)	5	3	2	0	—	292	11	0	2.26	.925
