= Tomáš Vak =

Czech ice hockey player

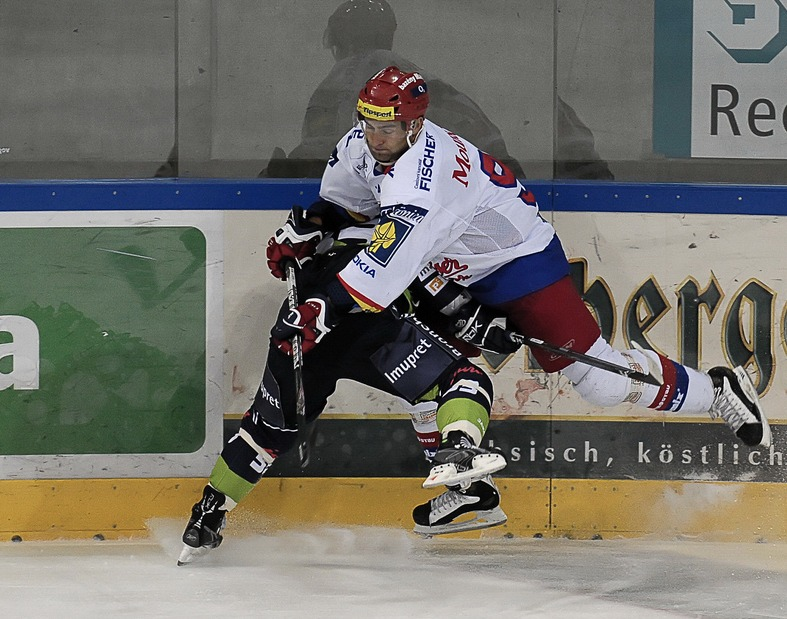
- Born: 11 May 1978 (age 48) Havlíčkův Brod, Czechoslovakia
- Height: 6 ft 2 in (188 cm)
- Weight: 231 lb (105 kg; 16 st 7 lb)
- Position: Right wing
- Shoots: Left
- KAZ team Former teams: Yertis Pavlodar; HC Pardubice; HC Vsetin; HC Karlovy Vary; HC Ceske Budejovice; Bílí Tygři Liberec
- Playing career: 1998–present

Tomáš Vak (born 11 May 1978) is a Czech professional ice hockey player who currently plays with Yertis Pavlodar of the Kazakhstan Hockey Championship.

Vak previously played for HC Rebel Havlíčkův Brod, HC Pardubice, HC Ytong Brno, HC Vsetín, HC Energie Karlovy Vary and HC České Budějovice.
