= Māris Jučers =

Latvian ice hockey player

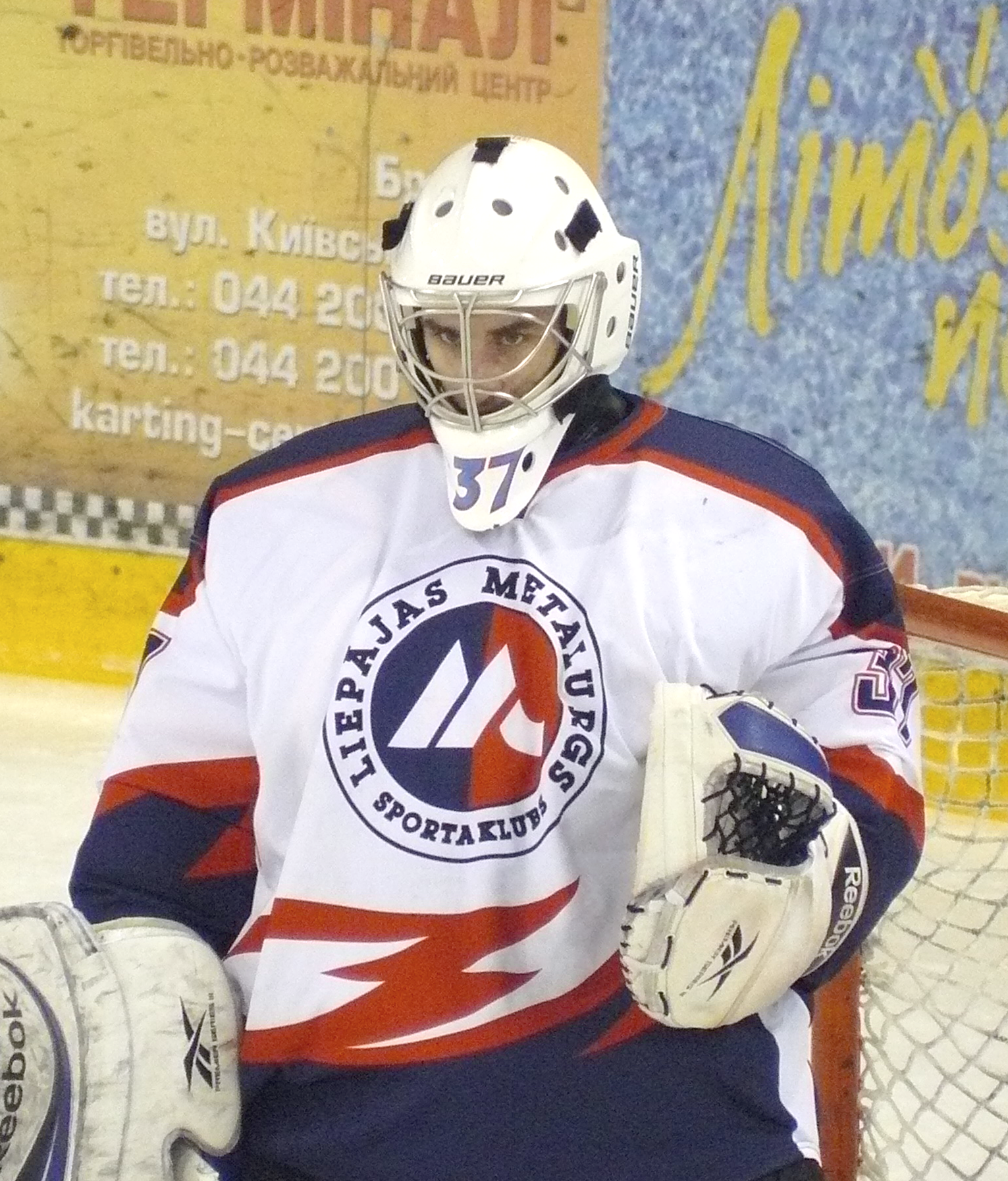
- Born: June 18, 1987 (age 38) Priekule, Latvian SSR, Soviet Union
- Height: 6 ft 2 in (188 cm)
- Weight: 176 lb (80 kg; 12 st 8 lb)
- Position: Goaltender
- Caught: Left
- Played for: HK Liepājas Metalurgs; Dinamo Riga; Beibarys Atyrau; Podhale Nowy Targ; LHC Les Lions; EHC Lustenau; HK Liepāja
- National team: Latvia
- NHL draft: Undrafted
- Playing career: 2004–2022

Māris Jučers (born June 18, 1987) is a Latvian former professional ice hockey goaltender. He last played for HK Liepāja of the Latvian Hockey Higher League.

Between 2007 and 2011, Jučers played for the Latvian club Metalurgs Liepaja, which participated in the Belarusian Extraleague. On July 19, 2011, it was announced that Māris signed a 2-year two-way contract with Dinamo Riga.

He participated at the 2012 IIHF World Championship and 2013 IIHF World Championship as a member of the Latvia men's national ice hockey team, as well playing two out of three games in qualifying for the 2014 Olympics.

On July 20, 2022, Jučers announced his retirement from professional hockey.
