= 2016–17 Kazakhstan Hockey Championship =

Kazakhstan Hockey Championship (2016–17)

- League: Kazakhstan Hockey Championship
- Sport: Ice Hockey
- Duration: September 2016 – April 2017
- Number of games: 303
- Number of teams: 10

Regular season
- Season champions: Arlan Kokshetau
- Top scorer: (Kazakhstan) Dmitry Orlov (HC Temirtau)(58 points)

Finals
- Champions: Nomad Astana

Kazakhstan Hockey Championship seasons
- ← 2015–16 2017–18 →

The 2016–17 Kazakhstan Hockey Championship was the 25th season since the founding of the Kazakhstan Hockey Championship.

== Teams ==
Teams of the 2016-17 KHC season

Team	City	Arena
Arlan Kokshetau	Kokshetau	Burabay Arena
Beibarys Atyrau	Atyrau	Khiuaz Dospanova Ice Palace
Gornyak Rudny	Rudny	Rudny Ice Palace
HC Almaty	Almaty	Baluan Sholak Sports Palace
HC Astana	Astana	Kazakhstan Sports Palace
HC Temirtau	Temirtau	Temirtau Muz Aydyny
Kulager Petropavl	Petropavl	Alexander Vinokourov Sports Palace
Nomad Astana	Astana	Kazakhstan Sports Palace
ShKO Oskemen	Ust-Kamenogorsk	Boris Alexandrov Sports Palace
Yertis Pavlodar	Pavlodar	Astana Ice Palace

== Regular season ==
=== Standings ===
Team	Pld	W	OTW	OTL	L	GF	GA	GD	Pts	Qualification
Arlan Kokshetau	54	38	4	2	10	182	103	+79	124	Direct playoff qualification
Beibarys Atyrau	54	31	9	3	11	171	103	+68	114	Direct playoff qualification
Nomad Astana	54	27	7	6	14	172	122	+50	101	Direct playoff qualification
Yertis Pavlodar	54	28	2	8	16	157	127	+30	96	Direct playoff qualification
Kulager Petropavl	54	27	4	5	18	149	109	+40	94	Direct playoff qualification
HC Almaty	54	24	5	7	18	137	138	−1	89	Direct playoff qualification
HC Temirtau	54	22	1	5	26	149	143	+6	73	Direct playoff qualification
ShKO Oskemen	54	9	8	5	32	101	172	−71	48	Direct playoff qualification
Gornyak Rudny	54	8	4	5	37	105	194	−89	37	
HC Astana	54	7	5	3	39	89	201	−112	34	

== Play-off ==
=== Quarterfinals ===
- Arlan Kokshetau defeated ShKO Oskemen 3 games to none
- HC Temirtau defeated Beibarys Atyrau 3 games to none
- Nomad Astana defeated HC Almaty 3 games to 1
- Yertis Pavlodar defeated Kulager Petropavl 3 games to 2

=== Semifinals ===
- HC Temirtau defeated Arlan Kokshetau 4 games to 3
- Nomad Astana defeated Yertis Pavlodar 4 games to none

=== Finals ===
- Nomad Astana defeated Arystan Temirtau 4 games to 3
