= Rudolf Huna =

Slovak ice hockey player

- Born: 27 May 1980 (age 45) Liptovský Mikuláš, TCH
- Height: 5 ft 9 in (175 cm)
- Weight: 198 lb (90 kg; 14 st 2 lb)
- Position: Left wing
- Shoots: Left
- Played for: MHk 32 Liptovský Mikuláš; HC Neftekhimik Nizhnekamsk; Leksands IF; HC Oceláři Třinec; Füchse Duisburg; HC Košice; HC Vítkovice; HC Lev Poprad; HK Poprad; HC Karlovy Vary; MsHK Žilina; Diables Rouges de Briançon
- National team: Slovakia
- Playing career: 1999–present

Rudolf Huna (born 27 May 1980) is a Slovak professional ice hockey forward.

Huna is the older brother of twin hockey players Robert Huna and Richard Huna. He has played in the Slovak Extraliga for MHk 32 Liptovský Mikuláš, HC Košice and HK Poprad and the Czech Extraliga for HC Oceláři Třinec, HC Vítkovice and HC Karlovy Vary. He has also played in the Russian Superleague for HC Neftekhimik Nizhnekamsk, the Swedish Elitserien for Leksands IF, the Deutsche Eishockey Liga for Füchse Duisburg, the Kontinental Hockey League for HC Lev Poprad and the Ligue Magnus for Diables Rouges de Briançon.

== Career statistics ==
=== Regular season and playoffs ===
			Regular season					Playoffs
Season	Team	League	GP	G	A	Pts	PIM	GP	G	A	Pts	PIM
