= Marek Mašlonka =

Slovak ice hockey player

- Born: 17 January 1987 (age 38); Poprad, Czechoslovakia
- Height: 5 ft 11 in (180 cm)
- Weight: 187 lb (85 kg; 13 st 5 lb)
- Position: Forward
- Shot: Right
- Played for: HK Poprad; MHK Kežmarok; HK Spišská Nová Ves; HK Nitra; Arlan Kokshetau; Ducs de Dijon; Guildford Flames; HK Dukla Michalovce
- Playing career: 2006–2022

Marek Mašlonka (born 17 January 1987) is a Slovak former professional ice hockey forward.

Mašlonka began his career with HK ŠKP Poprad and made his professional debut during the 2010–11 season. He also played for MHK Kežmarok and HK Nitra before moving to Arlan Kokshetau of Kazakhstan in 2013.

== Career statistics ==
=== Regular season and playoffs ===
			Regular season					Playoffs
Season	Team	League	GP	G	A	Pts	PIM	GP	G	A	Pts	PIM
Slovak totals			325	59	55	114	447	31	4	6	10	51
