= Ivan Kuchin =

Kazakhstani ice hockey player

- Born: 23 August 1988 (age 37) Magnitogorsk, Soviet Union
- Height: 6 ft 2 in (188 cm)
- Weight: 201 lb (91 kg; 14 st 5 lb)
- Position: Forward
- Shot: Left
- Played for: Sibir Novosibirsk; Metallurg Magnitogorsk; Barys Astana; Gornyak Rudny; Arlan Kokshetau; Nomad Astana; Beibarys Atyrau; Torpedo Ust-Kamenogorsk
- National team: Kazakhstan
- Playing career: 2008–2024

Ivan Kuchin (born 23 August 1988) is a Russian-born, Kazakhstani former professional ice hockey forward. He most recently played under contract with HK Aktobe of the Pro Hokei Ligasy. He played parts of two seasons in the Kontinental Hockey League, both with Barys Astana.
