= Martin Hujsa =

Slovak ice hockey player

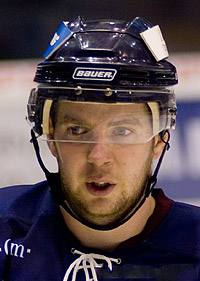
- Born: September 9, 1979 (age 46) Skalica, Czechoslovakia
- Height: 5 ft 10 in (178 cm)
- Weight: 165 lb (75 kg; 11 st 11 lb)
- Position: Left wing
- Shoots: Left
- Slovak 1. Liga team Former teams: HK 36 Skalica; HC Slovan Bratislava; HC Litvínov; Yertis Pavlodar; Brest Albatros Hockey; Nice hockey Côte d'Azur; HC Nové Zámky
- Playing career: 1997–present

Martin Hujsa (born September 9, 1979) is a Slovak professional ice hockey player who currently plays for HK 36 Skalica of the Slovak 1. Liga.

Hujsa previously played in the Slovak Extraliga for HK 36 Skalica, HC Slovan Bratislava and HC Nové Zámky, the Czech Extraliga for HC Litvínov, the Kazakhstan Hockey Championship for Yertis Pavlodar and the Ligue Magnus for Brest Albatros Hockey and Nice hockey Côte d'Azur.
