= Red Huns =

The names Red Huns, Karmir Xyon (in Iranian) and Kermichiones (in European languages) usually refer to:

- Kidarites
- A branch of the Xionites

== See also ==
- Hephthalites (White Huns)
