= 2013–14 Kazakhstan Hockey Championship =

- League: Kazakhstan Hockey Championship
- Sport: Ice Hockey
- Number of teams: 10

Regular season
- Winners: Yertis Pavlodar

Playoffs

Finals
- Champions: Yertis Pavlodar
- Runners-up: Arlan Kokshetau

Kazakhstan Hockey Championship seasons
- ← 2012–13 2014–15 →

The 2013–14 Kazakhstan Hockey Championship was the 22nd season of the Kazakhstan Hockey Championship, the top level of ice hockey in Kazakhstan. 10 teams participated in the league, and Yertis Pavlodar won the championship for the 2nd time in its history.

== Regular season ==
| # | Team | GP | W | OTW | SOW | SOL | OTL | L | Goals | Pts |
|---|---|---|---|---|---|---|---|---|---|---|
| 1 | Yertis Pavlodar | 54 | 39 | 3 | 2 | 2 | 2 | 6 | 214-99 | 131 |
| 2 | Arlan Kokshetau | 54 | 35 | 4 | 3 | 1 | 1 | 10 | 237-118 | 121 |
| 3 | Beibarys Atyrau | 54 | 29 | 0 | 4 | 5 | 2 | 14 | 185-115 | 102 |
| 4 | Arystan Temirtau | 54 | 30 | 0 | 4 | 0 | 1 | 19 | 214-165 | 99 |
| 5 | Nomad Astana | 54 | 22 | 0 | 5 | 4 | 0 | 23 | 159-158 | 80 |
| 6 | Berkut Karagandy | 54 | 20 | 2 | 2 | 5 | 0 | 25 | 153-152 | 73 |
| 7 | Gornyak Rudny | 54 | 20 | 2 | 0 | 5 | 2 | 25 | 171-173 | 71 |
| 8 | HC Astana | 54 | 21 | 0 | 1 | 2 | 1 | 29 | 160-185 | 68 |
| 9 | HC Almaty | 54 | 15 | 2 | 5 | 2 | 4 | 26 | 142-160 | 65 |
| 10 | Kazzinc-Torpedo-2 | 54 | 0 | 0 | 0 | 0 | 0 | 54 | 86-396 | 0 |

== Playoffs ==
Quarterfinals
2 | Arlan Kokshetau | 4
7 | Gornyak Rudny | 1
3 | Bibarys Atyrau | 4
6 | Berkut Karagandy | 1
1 | Yertis Pavlodar | 4
8 | HC Astana | 0
4 | Arystan Temirtau | 4
5 | Nomad Astana | 2

Semifinals
2 | Arlan Kokshetau | 4
3 | Beibarys Atyrau | 1
1 | Yertis Pavlodar | 4
4 | Arystan Temirtau | 1

Final
2 | Arlan Koshetau | 0
1 | Yertis Pavlodar | 4
