= Hun, Iran =

Hun هون
- Village
- Location within Iran
- Coordinates: 25°46′42″N 58°32′57″E
- Country: Iran
- Province: Hormozgan
- County: Jask
- Bakhsh: Central
- Rural District: Gabrik

Population (2006)
  - Total: 168
- Time zone: UTC+3:30 (IRST)
  - Summer (DST): UTC+4:30 (IRDT)

Hun (Persian: هون, also Romanized as Hūn, Hoon, and Hovon) is a village in Gabrik Rural District, in the Central District of Jask County, Hormozgan Province, Iran. At the 2006 census, its population was 168, in 37 families.
