= Vladimir Markelov (ice hockey) =

Kazakhstani ice hockey player

- Born: August 31, 1987 (age 37)
- Height: 175 cm (5 ft 9 in)
- Weight: 79 kg (174 lb; 12 st 6 lb)
- Position: Forward
- Shoots: Right
- KAZ team Former teams: Arlan Kokshetau; Sibir Novosibirsk; Barys Astana
- National team: Kazakhstan
- Playing career: 2006–present

Vladimir Markelov (born August 31, 1987) is a Russian professional ice hockey forward who currently plays for Arlan Kokshetau of the Kazakhstan Hockey Championship (KAZ). He has formerly played with Barys Astana of the Kontinental Hockey League (KHL).
