= Robert Huna =

Slovak ice hockey player

Róbert Huna
- Born: 9 March 1985 (age 41) Liptovský Mikuláš, Czechoslovakia
- Height: 5 ft 9 in (175 cm)
- Weight: 179 lb (81 kg; 12 st 11 lb)
- Position: Centre
- Shoots: Left
- Slovak 1. Liga team Former teams: HK Levice; MHk 32 Liptovský Mikuláš; HC Slovan Bratislava; MsHK Žilina; HC Košice; Yertis Pavlodar; HK Poprad; HC '05 Banská Bystrica; HK Brezno
- Playing career: 2002–present

Róbert Huna (born 9 March 1985) is a Slovak professional ice hockey player who currently playing for HK Levice of the Slovak 1. Liga.

He previously played for HC Slovan Bratislava, MsHK Žilina and HC Košice. He also played for Yertis Pavlodar of the Kazakhstan Hockey Championship. He is the twin brother of Richard Huna and the two have often been teammates together. He is also the younger brother of Rudolf Huna.

== Career statistics ==
=== Regular season and playoffs ===
| | | | Regular season | | | | | Playoffs |
| Season | Team | League | GP | G | A | Pts | PIM | GP | G | A | Pts | PIM |
| Slovak totals | | | 612 | 174 | 163 | 337 | 320 | 42 | 19 | 9 | 28 | 60 |
