= Richard Huna =

Slovak ice hockey player

- Born: 9 March 1985 (age 41) Liptovský Mikuláš, Czechoslovakia
- Height: 5 ft 9 in (175 cm)
- Weight: 179 lb (81 kg; 12 st 11 lb)
- Position: Forward
- Shoots: Left
- Slovak 1. Liga team Former teams: HK Levice; MHk 32 Liptovský Mikuláš; HC Slovan Bratislava; MsHK Žilina; HC Košice; Yertis Pavlodar; HK Poprad; HK Brezno
- Playing career: 2002–present

Richard Huna (born 9 March 1985) is a Slovak professional ice hockey player who currently playing for HK Levice of the Slovak 1. Liga.

He previously played for HC Slovan Bratislava, MsHK Žilina and HC Košice. He also played for Yertis Pavlodar of the Kazakhstan Hockey Championship. He is the twin brother of Robert Huna and the two have often been teammates together. His older brother Rudolf Huna is also an ice hockey player.

== Career statistics ==
=== Regular season and playoffs ===
			Regular season					Playoffs
Season	Team	League	GP	G	A	Pts	PIM	GP	G	A	Pts	PIM
Slovak totals			617	149	193	342	256	39	4	11	15	10
