= Rudny, Kazakhstan =

Rudny Рудный Rudnyi
- Location in Kazakhstan
- Coordinates: 52°58′N 63°8′E
- Country: Kazakhstan
- Region: Kostanay Region
- Established: August 30, 1957

Government
  - Akim (mayor): Viktor Ionenko

Area
  - Total: 192.16 km^{2} (74.19 sq mi)
  - Land: 176.39 km^{2} (68.10 sq mi)

Population
  - Total: 128,200 (2014)
- Time zone: UTC+5
- Area code: 71431
- Website: http://rudnet.kz/

Rudny (Kazakh: Рудный, Rudnyi) (Russian: Рудный Rudny) is a city on the Tobol River in Kostanay Region of Kazakhstan. It appeared in 1957 in connection with the development of iron ore deposits, the construction Sokolovsko-Sarbai mining, and processing enterprise. Population: 109,659 (2009 census results);109,515 (1999 census results).

On August 30, 1957, by a resolution of the Presidium of the Supreme Council of the Kazakh SSR, the village of builders SSGOK Rudny was transformed into a city with the preservation of the name - Rudny.

== Name ==
Initially, “Rudny” was the name of the settlement of the builders of the Sokolovrudstroy trust. Later, miners began to call it Rudnogorsk. After the construction of the tent city, it was proposed to be called Semidesyatipalatinsk. In official documents, the name of the settlement changed many times.

It is difficult to say what underlies the name of any settlement: more often than not, it is something very characteristic of it; less often - chance intervenes. Our city has had both. Here is how the first chief engineer of the Sokolovrudstroy trust, V.I. Buresh, talks about it: “We, the builders, called the village that we began to build on the site of the future city Rudny.” And so they began to write in all documents. The Kombinat comrades, also on their own, called it “Rudnogorsk”, and also designated it that way in their papers. In the first half of 1955, the director of the enterprise under construction - as the plant was then called - N. F. Sandrigailo and our trust manager J. M. Gimmelfard were in Moscow and Alma-Ata for about four months on the construction of the plant and the city. We, the chief engineers, remained in place for them. We used to prepare a general letter to some authority, put in it the date and our address “Rudny Village, Kustanai Region”; They brought it to the chief engineer of SSGOK Kandel for signature. He will cross out “Rudny Village” and write his own - “Rudnogorsk Village” and will always say: “It will be more optimistic that way!”

When the plant workers prepared the paper, the trust workers crossed out “Village Rudnogorsk” and wrote their own - “Village Rudny”. To the builders, such a name seemed more original and significant: after all, such a grandiose construction was actually started for the sake of ore. It is difficult to say how long this “war” would have lasted if V. M. Polynin, a special correspondent for the magazine “Ogonyok,” had not arrived at the construction site. He inspected the quarry, the settlement of geologists Pavlovsky and Komsomolsky, got acquainted in detail with the construction of the SSGOK and the beginning of the construction of the city, spent a lot of time with the first builders... The article by V. M. Polynin, which appeared in the fourteenth issue of Ogonyok (1955), was called “New settlers of Rudny”. It was she who drew the line under the “war” by choosing the name. The article contains the following words: “This city is not on the map, it is not even registered in the official lists, it does not yet have a name, but the pioneers of the new Magnitka believe that the most suitable name for it is the city of Rudny!” And so, with Polynin’s light hand, letters from all over the Soviet Union flew to the construction site, bearing the address - the city of Rudny! When they began to prepare documents to obtain the status of a workers' settlement for the new building, the dispute resumed again. Just at this time, N.F. Sandrigailo was summoned to the director of the Magnitogorsk plant. As he was getting ready to set off on the road, he gave his final orders and advice. And suddenly he asked: “What should we call the workers’ settlement? Probably later the city will be called the same!” — Well, they’ve already given it a name and the status of a city — Rudny. Letters are pouring into our city from all over the country. It turns out that the people have already decided this issue, why should we rack our brains over it,” said V.K. Lyutikov, one of the seven first employees of SSGOK, head of the planning department. - Well then! - said N.F. Sandrigailo, - I decided, I decided. This is what we will propose to the regional executive committee and the Supreme Council of Kazakhstan. The Presidium of the Supreme Council of the Kazakh SSR supported this proposal and in August 1956 issued a Decree, which stated: to classify the settlement during the construction of the Sokolovsko-Sarbaisky mining and processing plant in the Kustanai district of the Kustanai region as a workers’ settlement, giving it the name “Workers’ settlement Rudny” . Include the settlement of Komsomolsky within the boundaries of the workers' settlement of Rudny.

Seventy-palatinsk (tent city) V. N. Vysotsky and I. I. Dyachko

== Climate ==
Rudny has a warm-summer humid continental climate (Dfb) according to the Köppen climate classification, with a pronounced alternation of four seasons. In winter, during the week the temperature reaches the mark of minus 25-40 °C. Summer for two weeks to 30 °C.

Climate data for Rudny (1991–2020)
Month	Jan	Feb	Mar	Apr	May	Jun	Jul	Aug	Sep	Oct	Nov	Dec	Year
Mean daily maximum °C (°F)	−10.9 (12.4)	−9.4 (15.1)	−1.9 (28.6)	11.9 (53.4)	21.5 (70.7)	26.6 (79.9)	27.4 (81.3)	26.1 (79.0)	19.4 (66.9)	10.7 (51.3)	−1.1 (30.0)	−8.5 (16.7)	9.3 (48.7)
Daily mean °C (°F)	−15.6 (3.9)	−14.7 (5.5)	−7.1 (19.2)	5.5 (41.9)	14.2 (57.6)	19.7 (67.5)	21.0 (69.8)	19.2 (66.6)	12.6 (54.7)	4.8 (40.6)	−5.3 (22.5)	−13.0 (8.6)	3.4 (38.1)
Mean daily minimum °C (°F)	−20.2 (−4.4)	−19.5 (−3.1)	−11.8 (10.8)	−0.1 (31.8)	7.3 (45.1)	12.8 (55.0)	14.9 (58.8)	13.1 (55.6)	6.9 (44.4)	0.2 (32.4)	−9.1 (15.6)	−17.4 (0.7)	−1.9 (28.6)
Average precipitation mm (inches)	16.0 (0.63)	17.1 (0.67)	19.1 (0.75)	25.9 (1.02)	38.3 (1.51)	37.3 (1.47)	43.3 (1.70)	37.2 (1.46)	26.5 (1.04)	28.7 (1.13)	23.3 (0.92)	21.8 (0.86)	334.3 (13.16)
Average precipitation days (≥ 1.0 mm)	4.5	4.9	4.6	5.0	6.0	6.0	6.6	6.1	4.2	5.9	5.4	5.8	65.0
Source: NOAA

== Ethnic groups ==
	Ethnic Groups
Russian	57.2%
Kazakh	28.4%
Germans	2.3%
Others	12.1%

== History ==
On February 18, 1949, pilot Mikhail Grigorievich Surgutanov, flying over the Sarbay locality, noticed unusual compass behavior. A few months later, geologists and geographers arrived to investigate the magnetic anomaly, leading to the discovery of the Sokolovskoe iron ore deposit. The discovery and exploration of the deposit is credited to geologist B. N. Nosikov.

In the summer of 1954, the Soviet government decided to build a mining plant and a city. By May 1955, the first workers had arrived. The construction was overseen by Ya. M. Gimmel'marsh, with W. Buresh serving as chief engineer. In the early years, miners, geologists, and construction workers were housed in the village of Komsomolsk. Temporary tent settlements and prefabricated panel houses were established to accommodate the influx of workers.

By the end of 1955, an estimated 4,000 people had arrived in the Great Turgai region. The largest tent settlement was near the "Komsomol" cinema and consisted of seventy tents. Other camps were set up in the 39th Quarter, near Komsomolsky village, and in the bakery district, where over 200 tents each housed around 20 people. These early settlements had streets that are still present in the modern city, including Construction, Pionerskaya, Komsomolskaya, Ukrainian, and Kiev streets.

The future city was planned to be built three kilometers from Alekseyevka. The first general plan was developed in 1953 and was designed for a population of 22,000. However, in 1954, the plan was revised, increasing the projected population to 30,000.

In the summer of 1956, the Presidium of the Supreme Soviet of the Kazakh SSR granted Rudny the status of a workers' settlement. Komsomolsk was also officially incorporated into the settlement. On August 30, 1957, the workers' settlement was granted city status.

== Sport ==
The city represented Kostanay Region at the bandy tournament of the second Kazakhstani Youth Winter Games.
