= Huna kingdom =

Kingdom mentioned in the Indian epic Mahabharata

Hunas were a tribe close to Himalayas that, because of limited interaction with Indian kingdoms, were mentioned in the epic Mahabharata. They belonged to the Xinjiang province of China, east of Jammu-Kashmir. However, they were nomadic people who changed their settlements from time to time.

== References in Mahabharata ==
=== Huna mentioned as a kingdom of Ancient India (Bharata Varsha) ===
Among the tribes of the north are the Mlecchas, and the Kruras, the Yavanas, the Chinas, the Kambojas, the Darunas, and many Mleccha tribes; the Sukritvahas, the Kulatthas, the Hunas, and the Parasikas; the Ramanas, and the Dasamalikas. (6,9).

According to Dr V. A. Smith, this verse of Mahabharata is reminiscent of the period (4th/5th century AD) when the Hunas first came into contact with the Sassanians dynasty of Persia (See: Early History of India, p 339, Dr V. A. Smith; See also Early Empire of Central Asia, W. M. McGovern).

=== The origin myth of Huna tribe ===
Mahabharata links the origin of Hunas with sage Vasishta. Viswamitra attacked the cow of Vasishta. Then many armies emerged for the protection of that cow and they attacked the armies of Viswamitra. Thus this war was fought with the tribes allied with Vasishta for their own land. Other tribes that were mentioned along with the Hunas in this incident were Sakas, Yavanas, Savaras, Savaras, Paundras and Kiratas, and the barbarous tribes of Khasas, Chivukas, Pulindas, Chinas and numerous other Mlechchhas. (1,177)

From the list it seems that it is a compiled list of tribes formerly unknown to the Vedic Kingdoms.

The above story of Mahabharata differs somewhat from the Shavala cow story of Valmiki Ramayana. According to Valmiki Ramayana which is older than the Mahabharata, the list of the tribes connected with Vasishtha-Vishwamitra war over the possession of Shavala/Kamdhenu cow includes the Kambojas, Pahlavas, Yavanas, Shakas, Mlecchas, Haritas, Kiratas etc [Ramayana, Bala Kanda, 55.1-4]. Ramayana list being older is often taken more authentic of the two lists.

=== Role in Kurukshetra War ===
Yudhishthira, followed by the Patachcharas, the Hunas, the Pauravakas and the Nishadas, the Pisachas, with the Kundavishas, and the Mandakas, the Ladakas (Ladakh), the Tanganas, and the Uddras, the Saravas, the Tumbhumas, the Vatsas and the Nakulas stood in the two wings of the battle-array named Krauncharuma, formed by the Pandava generalissimo, Dhristadyumna, on the second day of the Kurukshetra War. (6,50)

== See also ==
- 36 royal races
- Middle Kingdoms of India
- Hunas
