= HC Astana =

- City: Astana, Kazakhstan
- League: Kazakhstan Hockey Championship
- Founded: 2011
- Home arena: Kazakhstan Sports Palace
- Colours
- Website: www.hc-astana.kz

Hockey Club Astana (Kazakh: «Астана» хоккей клубы, Astana hokkeı klýby) is a professional ice hockey team based in Astana, Kazakhstan. They were founded in 2011, and play in the Kazakhstan Hockey Championship, the top level of ice hockey in Kazakhstan.

== Season-by-season record ==
Note: GP = Games played, W = Wins, L = Losses, OTW = Overtime/shootout wins, OTL = Overtime/shootout losses, Pts = Points, GF = Goals for, GA = Goals against

| Season | GP | W | L | OTW | OTL | Pts | GF | GA | Finish | Playoffs |
|---|---|---|---|---|---|---|---|---|---|---|
| 2011–12 | 54 | 24 | 16 | 6 | 8 | 92 | 165 | 143 | 5th | Lost in Quarterfinals, 1–3 (Arystan Temirtau) |
| 2012–13 | 54 | 15 | 28 | 5 | 6 | 61 | 152 | 172 | 8th | Lost in Quarterfinals, 0–4 (Arlan Kokshetau) |
| 2013–14 | 54 | 21 | 29 | 1 | 3 | 68 | 160 | 185 | 8th | Lost in Quarterfinals, 0–4 (Yertis Pavlodar) |
| 2014–15 | 54 | 16 | 28 | 8 | 2 | 66 | 174 | 161 | 8th | Lost in Quarterfinals, 0–4 (Arlan Kokshetau) |

== Notable players ==
- Eldar Abdulayev (born 1985), Kazakhstani ice hockey player
- Maxime Moisand (born 1990), French ice hockey player
- Eliezer Sherbatov (born 1991), Canadian-Israeli ice hockey player

== Head coaches ==
- Vladimir Belyaev 2011–13
- Vladimir Strelchuk 2013–14
- Anatoli Chistyakov 2014–15
