= 2012–13 Kazakhstan Hockey Championship =

- League: Kazakhstan Hockey Championship
- Sport: Ice Hockey
- Teams: 10

Regular season
- Winners: Arlan Kokshetau

Playoffs

Finals
- Champions: Yertis Pavlodar
- Runners-up: Beibarys Atyrau

Kazakhstan Hockey Championship seasons
- ← 2011–12 2013–14 →

The 2012–13 Kazakhstan Hockey Championship was the 21st season of the Kazakhstan Hockey Championship, the top level of ice hockey in Kazakhstan. 10 teams participated in the league, and Yertis Pavlodar won the championship.

== Regular season ==
Team	GP	W	OTW	SOW	SOL	OTL	L	Goals	Pts
Arlan Kokshetau	54	37	1	5	0	2	9	231:116	125
Yertis Pavlodar	54	34	1	4	4	0	11	177:104	116
Arystan Temirtau	54	24	1	9	2	1	17	194:141	95
Beibarys Atyrau	54	26	2	2	8	0	16	150:97	94
Gornyak Rudny	54	27	1	1	5	1	19	155:152	91
HC Almaty	54	27	0	2	2	0	23	158:157	87
Barys Astana-2	54	21	1	3	3	1	25	151:164	75
HC Astana	54	15	1	4	5	1	28	152:172	61
Kazzinc-Torpedo-2	54	12	0	2	4	0	36	125:255	44
Saryarka Karaganda-2	54	5	0	2	1	2	44	77:212	22

== Playoffs ==
Quarterfinals
2	Yertis Pavlodar	4
7	Barys Astana-2	1
3	Arystan Temirtau	4
6	HC Almaty	1
1	Arlan Kokshetau	4
8	HC Astana	0
4	Beibarys Atyrau	4
5	Gornyak Rudny	0

Semifinals
2	Yertis Pavlodar	4
3	Arystan Temirtau	0
1	Arlan Kokshetau	1
4	Beibarys Atyrau	4

Final
2	Yertis Pavlodar	4
4	Beibarys Atyrau	1
