= HC Temirtau =

- City: Temirtau, Kazakhstan
- League: Kazakhstan Hockey Championship
- Founded: 2012
- Colours: Yellow and black
- Head coach: Sergei Kulev
- Affiliate: Saryarka Karagandy (VHL)

Hockey Club Temirtau (Kazakh: «Теміртау» хоккей клубы, HK Temirtaý) is a Kazakhstani ice hockey team based in Temirtau, Kazakhstan and play in the Kazakhstan Hockey Championship, the top level of ice hockey in Kazakhstan. They serve as the minor league affiliate of Saryarka Karagandy, who plays in the Russian-based Supreme Hockey League. Founded in 2012 as Saryarka–2, they became Berkut in 2013 and Temirtau in 2015.

== Season-by-season record ==
Note: GP = Games played, W = Wins, L = Losses, T = Ties, OTW = Overtime/shootout wins, OTL = Overtime/shootout losses, Pts = Points, GF = Goals for, GA = Goals against

Season	GP	W	L	OTW	OTL	Pts	GF	GA	Finish	Playoffs
2012–13	54	5	44	2	3	22	77	212	10th	Did not qualify
2013–14	54	20	25	4	5	73	153	152	6th	Lost in Quarterfinals, 1–4 (Beibarys Atyrau)
