= HC Almaty =

Hockey Club Almaty
- City: Almaty, Kazakhstan
- League: Kazakhstan Championship; 2011-present
- Founded: 2010
- Home arena: Baluan Sholak Palace of Culture and Sports
- Colors
- Website: almaty-hc.kz

Franchise history
- 2010–present: HC Almaty

Hockey Club Almaty (Kazakh: Алматы хоккей клубы; Almaty Hokei Kluby, Russian: Хоккейный клуб Алматы) is a professional ice hockey team based in Almaty, Kazakhstan. They were founded in 2010, and play in the Kazakhstan Hockey Championship, the top level of ice hockey in Kazakhstan. They play at the Baluan Sholak Palace of Culture and Sports named after Baluan Sholak.

== Season-by-season record ==
Note: GP = Games played, W = Wins, L = Losses, T = Ties, OTW = Overtime/shootout wins, OTL = Overtime/shootout losses, Pts = Points, GF = Goals for, GA = Goals against

Season	GP	W	L	OTW	OTL	Pts	GF	GA	Finish	Playoffs
2010–11	54	12	32	3	7	49	150	198	9th	Did not qualify
2011–12	54	16	27	7	4	66	146	175	8th	Lost in Quarterfinals, 3-0 (Beibarys Atyrau)
2012–13	54	27	23	2	2	87	159	157	6th	Lost in Quarterfinals, 4-1 (Arystan Temirtau)

== Head coaches ==
- (Kazakhstan) Alexander Vysotsky 2010-12
- (Kazakhstan) Oleg Bolyakin 2012
- (Kazakhstan) Alexander Vysotsky 2012-13

== Past players ==
- Andrei Stelmakh

== See also ==
- Yenbek Almaty
