= 2019 IIHF World Championship Division II =

Tournament details
- Host countries: Serbia; Mexico
- Venues: 2 (in 2 host cities)
- Dates: 9–15 April; 21–27 April
- Teams: 12

The 2019 IIHF World Championship Division II was an international ice hockey tournament run by the International Ice Hockey Federation.

The Group A tournament was held in Belgrade, Serbia, from 9 to 15 April, and the Group B tournament in México City, Mexico, from 21 to 27 April 2019.

Serbia and Israel won the Group A and B tournaments, and were promoted, while Belgium and North Korea finished last and were relegated. Israel's Eliezer Sherbatov was the scoring leader, with 15 points.

== Group A tournament ==
2019 IIHF World Championship Division II A

Tournament details
- Host country: Serbia
- Venue: 1 (in 1 host city)
- Dates: 9–15 April
- Teams: 6

Tournament statistics
- Games played: 15
- Goals scored: 92 (6.13 per game)
- Attendance: 4,536 (302 per game)
- Scoring leader: (Belgium) Bryan Kolodziejczyk (9 points)

Official website
- Website

=== Participants ===
| Team | Qualification |
|---|---|
| Croatia | Placed 6th in Division I B last year and were relegated. |
| Australia | Placed 2nd in Division II A last year. |
| Serbia | Host, placed 3rd in Division II A last year. |
| China | Placed 4th in Division II A last year. |
| Belgium | Placed 5th in Division II A last year. |
| Spain | Placed 1st in Division II B last year and were promoted. |

=== Match officials ===
4 referees and 7 linesmen were selected for the tournament.

| Referees | Linesmen |
|---|---|
| (Austria) Christoph Sternat; (Belarus) Miroslav Iarets; (Latvia) Jevgēņijs Griškevičs; (Netherlands) Ramon Sterkens | (United Kingdom) Daniel Beresford; (United Kingdom) James Kavanagh; (Japan) Kensuke Kanazawa; (Norway) Håvar Dahl; (Serbia) Tibor Fazekas; (Serbia) Ivan Nedeljković; (Serbia) David Perduv |

=== Standings ===
| Pos | Team | Pld | W | OTW | OTL | L | GF | GA | GD | Pts | Qualification or relegation |
|---|---|---|---|---|---|---|---|---|---|---|---|
| 1 | Serbia (H, P) | 5 | 3 | 1 | 0 | 1 | 20 | 14 | +6 | 11 (Note: Serbia 3–1 Croatia) | Promotion to 2020 Division I B |
| 2 | Croatia | 5 | 3 | 1 | 0 | 1 | 19 | 9 | +10 | 11 | |
| 3 | Australia | 5 | 3 | 0 | 1 | 1 | 14 | 10 | +4 | 10 | |
| 4 | Spain | 5 | 2 | 0 | 2 | 1 | 14 | 16 | −2 | 8 | |
| 5 | China | 5 | 1 | 0 | 0 | 4 | 14 | 21 | −7 | 3 | |
| 6 | Belgium (R) | 5 | 0 | 1 | 0 | 4 | 11 | 22 | −11 | 2 | Relegation to 2020 Division II B |

Source: IIHF
Rules for classification: 1) points; 2) head-to-head points; 3) head-to-head goal difference; 4) head-to-head number of goals scored; 5) result against closest best-ranked team outside tied teams; 6) result against second-best ranked team outside tied teams; 7) seeding before tournament.
(H) Host; (P) Promoted; (R) Relegated

=== Results ===
All times are local (UTC+2).

| 9 April 2019; 13:00 | Spain | 5–3 (2–1, 1–1, 2–1) | China | Pionir Ice Hall, Belgrade; Attendance: 68 |

Game reference

Ander Alcaine
Goalies
Han Pengfei
Referee:
(Austria) Christoph Sternat
Linesmen:
(Japan) Kensuke Kanazawa
(Serbia) David Perduv

| Carbonell (Fuentes, Ubieto) (PP) – 06:38 | 1–0 |
| | 1–1 | 08:48 – Li (Zhang C., Chen Le.) |
| Fuentes (Burgos, Ubieto) (PP) – 16:27 | 2–1 |
| | 2–2 | 20:41 – Yang (Zhang P., Zhang C.) (PP) |
| Lasuen – 27:35 | 3–2 |
| | 3–3 | 43:16 – Zhang H. (Liang) |
| Baldris – 53:50 | 4–3 |
| Rubio (Carbonell, García) (EN) – 59:16 | 5–3 |

4 min
Penalties
10 min
34
Shots
24

| 9 April 2019; 16:30 | Australia | 3–4 OT (3–0, 0–2, 0–1) (OT: 0–1) | Belgium | Pionir Ice Hall, Belgrade; Attendance: 38 |

Game reference

Anthony Kimlin
Goalies
Wouter Peeters
Referee:
(Belarus) Miroslav Iarets
Linesmen:
(Serbia) Tibor Fazekas
(Serbia) Ivan Nedeljković

| Rezek (Baclig) – 01:31 | 1–0 |
| Malloy (Rezek) – 02:58 | 2–0 |
| Kubara (Darge, Wong) – 07:17 | 3–0 |
| | 3–1 | 30:13 – De Schepper (Verelst, B. Kolodziejczyk) (PP2) |
| | 3–2 | 31:00 – Verelst (B. Kolodziejczyk, Paulus) (PP) |
| | 3–3 | 40:26 – Verelst (B. Kolodziejczyk) |
| | 3–4 | 62:56 – De Croock (Paulus) |

10 min
Penalties
4 min
32
Shots
37

| 9 April 2019; 20:00 | Serbia | 3–1 (1–1, 1–0, 1–0) | Croatia | Pionir Ice Hall, Belgrade; Attendance: 1,126 |

Game reference

Arsenije Ranković
Goalies
Vilim Rosandić
Referee:
(Latvia) Jevgēņijs Griškevičs
Linesmen:
(United Kingdom) Daniel Beresford
(United Kingdom) James Kavanagh

| Sretović (Kastel) (PP) – 13:47 | 1–0 |
| | 1–1 | 16:41 – Janković (L. Jarčov) (PP) |
| Popravka (Vučurević, Podunavac) – 30:07 | 2–1 |
| Luković (Sretović, Brkušanin) (ENG) – 59:23 | 3–1 |

16 min
Penalties
18 min
37
Shots
30

| 10 April 2019; 13:00 | Belgium | 2–4 (0–2, 1–0, 1–2) | Spain | Pionir Ice Hall, Belgrade; Attendance: 20 |

Game reference

Wouter Peeters
Goalies
Ander Alcaine
Referee:
(Latvia) Jevgēņijs Griškevičs
Linesmen:
(United Kingdom) Daniel Beresford
(Serbia) Tibor Fazekas

| | 0–1 | 02:51 – Granell (Zaballa) |
| | 0–2 | 13:02 – Fuentes |
| Verelst (B. Kolodziejczyk) (SH) – 20:38 | 1–2 |
| | 1–3 | 41:17 – Rubio (Carbonell, Ubieto) |
| B. Kolodziejczyk (Neven) – 43:30 | 2–3 |
| | 2–4 | 43:39 – Burgos (Beltrán, Carbonell) |

26 min
Penalties
10 min
24
Shots
45

| 10 April 2019; 16:30 | Croatia | 7–0 (2–0, 3–0, 2–0) | China | Pionir Ice Hall, Belgrade; Attendance: 42 |

Game reference

Vilim Rosandić
Goalies
Sun Zehao
Referee:
(Netherlands) Ramon Sterkens
Linesmen:
(United Kingdom) James Kavanagh
(Serbia) David Perduv

| Morrisonn (PP) – 09:20 | 1–0 |
| Janković (Zanoški, Morrisonn) (PP2) – 10:26 | 2–0 |
| Šakić (Zanoški, Janković) (PP) – 22:22 | 3–0 |
| Mirić (Morrisonn, Šakić) (PP) – 37:22 | 4–0 |
| Šakić (Novak, Mirić) – 39:39 | 5–0 |
| Novak (Mirić, Šakić) – 50:52 | 6–0 |
| Kanaet (Janković) – 56:53 | 7–0 |

6 min
Penalties
68 min
48
Shots
19

| 10 April 2019; 20:00 | Australia | 3–2 (2–1, 1–0, 0–1) | Serbia | Pionir Ice Hall, Belgrade; Attendance: 653 |

Game reference

Anthony Kimlin
Goalies
Arsenije Ranković
Referee:
(Belarus) Miroslav Iarets
Linesmen:
(Norway) Håvar Dahl
(Japan) Kensuke Kanazawa

| | 0–1 | 03:17 – Dragutinović (Luković) |
| Armstrong (Todd, McMahon) (SH) – 10:59 | 1–1 |
| Virjassov – 14:44 | 2–1 |
| Woodman (Virjassov, Powell) (PP) – 26:29 | 3–1 |
| | 3–2 | 45:57 – Đumić (Dragović) |

29 min
Penalties
4 min
26
Shots
34

| 12 April 2019; 13:00 | Croatia | 5–2 (2–0, 1–2, 2–0) | Belgium | Pionir Ice Hall, Belgrade; Attendance: 53 |

Game reference

Vilim Rosandić
Goalies
Wouter Peeters
Referee:
(Belarus) Miroslav Iarets
Linesmen:
(Serbia) Ivan Nedeljković
(Serbia) David Perduv

| Mikulić (Mirić, Srketić) (SH) – 04:19 | 1–0 |
| Jarčov (Morrisonn, Zanoški) – 04:53 | 2–0 |
| | 2–1 | 27:36 – Verelst (B. Kolodziejczyk, De Croock) |
| Kanaet (Janković, Srketić) – 31:38 | 3–1 |
| | 3–2 | 38:22 – Paulus (B. Kolodziejczyk, Verelst) |
| Janković – 57:11 | 4–2 |
| Šakić (Smolec) (EN) – 59:00 | 5–2 |

6 min
Penalties
10 min
38
Shots
26

| 12 April 2019; 16:30 | Australia | 4–0 (1–0, 2–0, 1–0) | Spain | Pionir Ice Hall, Belgrade; Attendance: 67 |

Game reference

Anthony Kimlin
Goalies
Ander Alcaine
Referee:
(Netherlands) Ramon Sterkens
Linesmen:
(United Kingdom) Daniel Beresford
(Japan) Kensuke Kanazawa

| Darge (Malloy, Woodman) (PP2) – 13:01 | 1–0 |
| Baclig (SH) – 25:24 | 2–0 |
| Lindsay (Webster, Virjassov) – 39:09 | 3–0 |
| Virjassov (Webster, Taylor) – 55:50 | 4–0 |

8 min
Penalties
14 min
26
Shots
37

| 12 April 2019; 20:00 | Serbia | 6–5 (1–2, 1–3, 4–0) | China | Pionir Ice Hall, Belgrade; Attendance: 536 |

Game reference

Arsenije Ranković
Jug Mitić
Goalies
Han Pengfei
Referee:
(Austria) Christoph Sternat
Linesmen:
(Norway) Håvar Dahl
(United Kingdom) James Kavanagh

| | 0–1 | 10:36 – Li (Chen Le., Chen Z.) |
| | 0–2 | 16:15 – Huang (Yang) (PP) |
| Lestarić (Novaković, Đumić) – 17:42 | 1–2 |
| Podunavac (Bosković, Kerezović) (PP) – 22:55 | 2–2 |
| | 2–3 | 26:36 – Yang (Zhang Z., Ying) (PP) |
| | 2–4 | 36:54 – Chen L. (Zhang C., Li) |
| | 2–5 | 38:11 – Xia |
| Crnogorac (Kerezović, Đumić) – 49:04 | 3–5 |
| Sabadoš (Đumić, Podunavac) (PP) – 51:33 | 4–5 |
| Luković (Kastel) (EA) – 58:24 | 5–5 |
| Kastel (Crnogorac, Sretović) (EA) – 59:46 | 6–5 |

6 min
Penalties
14 min
44
Shots
28

| 13 April 2019; 13:00 | China | 2–3 (0–0, 2–1, 0–2) | Australia | Pionir Ice Hall, Belgrade; Attendance: 62 |

Game reference

Sun Zehao
Goalies
Anthony Kimlin
Referee:
(Netherlands) Ramon Sterkens
Linesmen:
(Serbia) Tibor Fazekas
(Japan) Kensuke Kanazawa

| Chen Li. (Xia) – 25:27 | 1–0 |
| | 1–1 | 25:51 – Darge (Armstrong, Powell) |
| Zhang Z. (Yang) – 30:43 | 2–1 |
| | 2–2 | 51:16 – Rezek (Haselhurst) |
| | 2–3 | 57:42 – Rezek (Todd, Baclig) (PP2) |

18 min
Penalties
4 min
25
Shots
45

| 13 April 2019; 16:30 | Spain | 3–4 GWS (1–0, 1–2, 1–1) (OT: 0–0) (SO: 0–1) | Croatia | Pionir Ice Hall, Belgrade; Attendance: 73 |

Game reference

Ander Alcaine
Goalies
Vilim Rosandić
Referee:
(Austria) Christoph Sternat
Linesmen:
(Norway) Håvar Dahl
(Serbia) Ivan Nedeljković

| Burgos (Rubio, Carbonell) – 19:29 | 1–0 |
| Baldris (Burgos) – 24:54 | 2–0 |
| | 2–1 | 28:26 – Vedlin (L. Jarčov, Janković) (PP) |
| | 2–2 | 37:20 – Rene Čanić (Mikulić, Kanaet) |
| | 2–3 | 44:20 – Šakić (Janković, L. Jarčov) |
| G. González (Granell) (PP) – 47:14 | 3–3 |

Burgos (miss)
Rubio
Boronat (miss)
Fuentes (miss)
Pantoja (miss)
Shootout
Janković
Zanoški
(miss) Mirić
(miss) Šakić
4 min
Penalties
8 min
26
Shots
29

| 13 April 2019; 20:00 | Belgium | 3–6 (1–2, 0–2, 2–2) | Serbia | Pionir Ice Hall, Belgrade; Attendance: 417 |

Game reference

Wouter Peeters
Goalies
Arsenije Ranković
Referee:
(Latvia) Jevgēņijs Griškevičs
Linesmen:
(United Kingdom) Daniel Beresford
(United Kingdom) James Kavanagh

| | 0–1 | 04:40 – Dragović (Đumić) |
| | 0–2 | 07:52 – Bosković (Đumić) |
| Coolen (Verelst, Neven) (PP) – 08:55 | 1–2 |
| | 1–3 | 22:29 – Sretović (Brkušanin) |
| | 1–4 | 33:42 – Brkušanin (Popravka) (PP) |
| | 1–5 | 41:10 – Sretović (Popravka) |
| B. Kolodziejczyk (Paulus) (SH) – 44:23 | 2–5 |
| Neven (B. Kolodziejczyk) (PP2) – 45:45 | 3–5 |
| | 3–6 | 57:06 – Bosković (Brkušanin, Luković) (PP2) |

18 min
Penalties
35 min
30
Shots
38

| 15 April 2019; 13:00 | Croatia | 2–1 (1–0, 1–1, 0–0) | Australia | Pionir Ice Hall, Belgrade; Attendance: 79 |

Game reference

Vilim Rosandić
Goalies
Anthony Kimlin
Referee:
(Netherlands) Ramon Sterkens
Linesmen:
(United Kingdom) James Kavanagh
(Serbia) David Perduv

| Morrisonn (Zanoški) – 00:31 | 1–0 |
| | 1–1 | 32:20 – Rezek (Todd, Malloy) |
| Kanaet (Morrisonn, Vedlin) (SH) – 38:13 | 2–1 |

34 min
Penalties
8 min
45
Shots
39

| 15 April 2019; 16:30 | China | 4–0 (1–0, 2–0, 1–0) | Belgium | Pionir Ice Hall, Belgrade; Attendance: 26 |

Game reference

Sun Zehao
Goalies
Wouter Peeters
Cisse Van der Weyde
Referee:
(Belarus) Miroslav Iarets
Linesmen:
(Serbia) Tibor Fazekas
(Japan) Kensuke Kanazawa

| Zhang Z. (Hu) – 04:08 | 1–0 |
| Ying (Hu, Wang) – 34:42 | 2–0 |
| Zhang Z. (Ying, Xiang) (PP) – 37:35 | 3–0 |
| Zhang C. – 53:03 | 4–0 |

39 min
Penalties
53 min
25
Shots
34

| 15 April 2019; 20:00 | Serbia | 3–2 GWS (1–0, 0–1, 1–1) (OT: 0–0) (SO: 1–0) | Spain | Pionir Ice Hall, Belgrade; Attendance: 1,276 |

Game reference

Arsenije Ranković
Goalies
Ander Alcaine
Referee:
(Austria) Christoph Sternat
Linesmen:
(United Kingdom) Daniel Beresford
(Norway) Håvar Dahl

| Luković (Brkušanin, Ilić) – 04:10 | 1–0 |
| | 1–1 | 26:03 – González (Betrán, Fuentes) |
| | 1–2 | 46:34 – Rubio (Carbonell, Fuentes) (PP) |
| Bošković (EA) – 59:32 | 2–2 |

Kerezović (miss)
Đumić
Popravka (miss)
Sretović (miss)
Brkušanin
Shootout
(miss) Pantoja
Rubio
(miss) Boronat
(miss) González
(miss) Ubieto
6 min
Penalties
4 min
42
Shots
31

=== Awards and statistics ===
==== Awards ====
- Best players selected by the directorate:
  - Best Goalkeeper: (Croatia) Vilim Rosandić
  - Best Defenseman: (Croatia) Shaone Morrisonn
  - Best Forward: (Serbia) Mirko Đumić

Source: IIHF.com

==== Scoring leaders ====
List shows the top skaters sorted by points, then goals.

| Player | GP | G | A | Pts | +/− | PIM | POS |
|---|---|---|---|---|---|---|---|
| (Belgium) Bryan Kolodziejczyk | 5 | 2 | 7 | 9 | +2 | 0 | F |
| (Croatia) Ivan Janković | 5 | 3 | 5 | 8 | +3 | 0 | F |
| (Belgium) Sam Verelst | 5 | 4 | 3 | 7 | −3 | 2 | F |
| (Croatia) Marko Šakić | 5 | 4 | 2 | 6 | +7 | 0 | F |
| (Croatia) Shaone Morrisonn | 5 | 2 | 4 | 6 | −1 | 26 | D |
| (Spain) Alejandro Carbonell | 5 | 1 | 5 | 6 | +3 | 2 | F |
| (Serbia) Mirko Đumić | 5 | 1 | 5 | 6 | +4 | 0 | F |
| (Australia) Josef Rezek | 5 | 4 | 1 | 5 | +2 | 2 | F |
| (Serbia) Aleksa Luković | 5 | 3 | 2 | 5 | +5 | 2 | D |
| (Serbia) Marko Sretović | 5 | 3 | 2 | 5 | +5 | 0 | F |

GP = Games played; G = Goals; A = Assists; Pts = Points; +/− = Plus/minus; PIM = Penalties in minutes; POS = Position
Source: IIHF.com

==== Goaltending leaders ====
Only the top five goaltenders, based on save percentage, who have played at least 40% of their team's minutes, are included in this list.

| Player | TOI | GA | GAA | SA | Sv% | SO |
|---|---|---|---|---|---|---|
| (Croatia) Vilim Rosandić | 304:21 | 8 | 1.58 | 146 | 94.52 | 1 |
| (Australia) Anthony Kimlin | 302:53 | 10 | 1.98 | 178 | 94.38 | 1 |
| (China) Sun Zehao | 180:00 | 10 | 3.33 | 127 | 92.13 | 1 |
| (Serbia) Arsenije Ranković | 298:41 | 13 | 2.61 | 140 | 90.71 | 0 |
| (Spain) Ander Alcaine | 309:58 | 14 | 2.71 | 143 | 90.21 | 0 |

TOI = Time on ice (minutes:seconds); SA = Shots against; GA = Goals against; GAA = Goals against average; Sv% = Save percentage; SO = Shutouts
Source: IIHF.com

== Group B tournament ==
2019 IIHF World Championship Division II B

Tournament details
- Host country: Mexico
- Venue: 1 (in 1 host city)
- Dates: 21–27 April
- Teams: 6

Tournament statistics
- Games played: 15
- Goals scored: 138 (9.2 per game)
- Attendance: 7,031 (469 per game)
- Scoring leader: (Israel) Eliezer Sherbatov (15 points)

Official website
- Website

=== Participants ===
| Team | Qualification |
|---|---|
| Iceland | Placed 6th in Division II A last year and were relegated. |
| New Zealand | Placed 2nd in Division II B last year. |
| Israel | Placed 3rd in Division II B last year. |
| North Korea | Placed 4th in Division II B last year. |
| Mexico | Host, placed 5th in Division II B last year. |
| Georgia | Placed 1st in Division III last year and were promoted. |

=== Match officials ===
4 referees and 7 linesmen were selected for the tournament.

| Referees | Linesmen |
|---|---|
| (Belgium) Tim Tzirtziganis; (Lithuania) Benas Jakšys; (Poland) Tomasz Radzik; (United States) Andrew Thackaberry | (Czech Republic) Tomáš Brejcha; (Denmark) Lasse Dahlerup; (Mexico) Sem Ramírez; (Slovenia) Anže Bergant; (Spain) Sergio Biec; (Switzerland) Marc-Henri Progin; (United States) Justin Cornell |

=== Standings ===
| Pos | Team | Pld | W | OTW | OTL | L | GF | GA | GD | Pts | Qualification or relegation |
|---|---|---|---|---|---|---|---|---|---|---|---|
| 1 | Israel (P) | 5 | 4 | 1 | 0 | 0 | 32 | 16 | +16 | 14 | Promotion to 2020 Division II A |
| 2 | Iceland | 5 | 3 | 0 | 0 | 2 | 26 | 15 | +11 | 9 (Note: Iceland 4–2 New Zealand) | |
| 3 | New Zealand | 5 | 3 | 0 | 0 | 2 | 26 | 18 | +8 | 9 | |
| 4 | Georgia | 5 | 2 | 0 | 0 | 3 | 18 | 27 | −9 | 6 | |
| 5 | Mexico (H) | 5 | 1 | 0 | 1 | 3 | 17 | 25 | −8 | 4 | |
| 6 | North Korea (R) | 5 | 1 | 0 | 0 | 4 | 19 | 37 | −18 | 3 | Relegation to 2020 Division III A |

Source: IIHF
Rules for classification: 1) points; 2) head-to-head points; 3) head-to-head goal difference; 4) head-to-head number of goals scored; 5) result against closest best-ranked team outside tied teams; 6) result against second-best ranked team outside tied teams; 7) seeding before tournament.
(H) Host; (P) Promoted; (R) Relegated

=== Results ===
All times are local (UTC−5).

| 21 April 2019; 13:00 | Israel | 6–3 (2–1, 2–1, 2–1) | Iceland | Santa Fe Ice Rink, Mexico City; Attendance: 750 |

Game reference

Nir Tichon
Goalies
Dennis Hedström
Referee:
(United States) Andrew Thackaberry
Linesmen:
(United States) Justin Cornell
(Switzerland) Marc-Henri Progin

| Ben Tiv (Frenkel, Halpert) – 07:26 | 1–0 |
| | 1–1 | 09:22 - Jakobsson (Atlason, Knútsson) |
| Mazour (Klein, Frenkel) (PP) – 14:23 | 2–1 |
| Vernyy – 21:36 | 3–1 |
| Mazour (Kozevnikov) (PP) – 36:23 | 4–1 |
| | 4–2 | 39:25 - Atlason (Knútsson, Sigurðsson) |
| | 4–3 | 57:45 - Sigurðsson (Orongan) (EA) |
| Halpert (Sherbatov) (EN) – 58:28 | 5–3 |
| R. Aharonovich (EN) – 59:46 | 6–3 |

6 min
Penalties
24 min
40
Shots
32

| 21 April 2019; 16:30 | Georgia | 4–9 (2–2, 2–3, 0–4) | North Korea | Santa Fe Ice Rink, Mexico City; Attendance: 753 |

Game reference

Andrey Ilyenko
Goalies
Pak Il
Jo Kwang-su
Referee:
(Belgium) Tim Tzirtziganis
Linesmen:
(Slovenia) Anže Bergant
(Mexico) Sem Ramírez

| Kozyulin (Obolgogiani) – 05:08 | 1–0 |
| | 1–1 | 08:36 – Hong |
| | 1–2 | 09:17 – Kang M. (Kang I., Ryu) (PP) |
| Vasilchenko (Zhuzhunashvili) – 18:09 | 2–2 |
| Kochkin (Zhuzhunashvili) (SH) – 22:40 | 3–2 |
| Kharizov (Tsomaia) – 23:51 | 4–2 |
| | 4–3 | 24:42 – Hong (Kang M.) |
| | 4–4 | 36:16 – Ri K. (Kang M., Ryu) (PP) |
| | 4–5 | 37:18 – Hong (Kang I., Kim H.) |
| | 4–6 | 44:03 – Ri S. (Kang I.) |
| | 4–7 | 46:10 – Ri S. (Kang I.) |
| | 4–8 | 52:34 – An (Hong, Kim Kw.) (PP) |
| | 4–9 | 53:57 – Hong (Kim Kw.) |

53 min
Penalties
14 min
40
Shots
40

| 21 April 2019; 20:15 | New Zealand | 7–2 (4–1, 3–1, 0–0) | Mexico | Santa Fe Ice Rink, Mexico City; Attendance: 1,250 |

Game reference

Richard Parry
Goalies
Andrés de la Garma
Sebastián de la Vega
Referee:
(Poland) Tomasz Radzik
Linesmen:
(Spain) Sergio Biec
(Czech Republic) Tomáš Brejcha

| Eaden (Heyd, Lee) – 03:04 | 1–0 |
| | 1–1 | 03:43 – Majul (Cruz) |
| Strayer (Polozov, Amston) (PP) – 10:31 | 2–1 |
| Challis (Lee, Eaden) (PP) – 19:13 | 3–1 |
| Cox (Eaden, Schneider) – 19:46 | 4–1 |
| | 4–2 | 20:50 – Gómez (Sierra, Pérez) |
| Schneider (Strayer, Polozov) (PP) – 23:10 | 5–2 |
| Amston (PP) – 32:36 | 6–2 |
| Cox (Schneider, Polozov) – 38:50 | 7–2 |

16 min
Penalties
20 min
44
Shots
24

| 22 April 2019; 13:00 | Iceland | 8–0 (4–0, 3–0, 1–0) | North Korea | Santa Fe Ice Rink, Mexico City; Attendance: 100 |

Game reference

Dennis Hedström
Goalies
Jo Kwang-su
Pak Il
Referee:
(Lithuania) Benas Jakšys
Linesmen:
(Slovenia) Anže Bergant
(Spain) Sergio Biec

| Leifsson (Mikaelsson) – 01:18 | 1–0 |
| Račanský (Knútsson) (SH) – 02:34 | 2–0 |
| Mikaelsson (Leifsson, Sigrunarson) (PP) – 08:34 | 3–0 |
| Račanský (Orongan, Sigurðsson) (PP) – 12:00 | 4–0 |
| Leifsson (PS) – 24:52 | 5–0 |
| Leifsson – 30:46 | 6–0 |
| Sigurðsson – 36:44 | 7–0 |
| Sigurðsson (Pålsson) – 51:13 | 8–0 |

20 min
Penalties
20 min
58
Shots
15

| 22 April 2019; 16:30 | New Zealand | 3–5 (1–1, 0–2, 2–2) | Israel | Santa Fe Ice Rink, Mexico City; Attendance: 208 |

Game reference

Richard Parry
Goalies
Nir Tichon
Referee:
(Belgium) Tim Tzirtziganis
Linesmen:
(United States) Justin Cornell
(Denmark) Lasse Dahlerup

| | 0–1 | 08:16 – Kozhevnikov |
| Schneider (Strayer, Cox) (PP) – 17:12 | 1–1 |
| | 1–2 | 28:59 – Frenkel (Klein) |
| | 1–3 | 38:33 – Kozhevnikov |
| Heyd (Eaden, Craig) | 2–3 |
| | 2–4 | 47:04 – Kozhevnikov (Kozevnikov, Geller) (PP) |
| Amston – 51:26 | 3–4 |
| | 3–5 | 59:55 – Sherbatov (ENG) |

4 min
Penalties
12 min
31
Shots
35

| 22 April 2019; 20:00 | Mexico | 2–3 (1–1, 0–1, 1–1) | Georgia | Santa Fe Ice Rink, Mexico City; Attendance: 798 |

Game reference

Andrés de la Garma
Goalies
Andrey Ilyenko
Referee:
(United States) Andrew Thackaberry
Linesmen:
(Czech Republic) Tomáš Brejcha
(Switzerland) Marc-Henri Progin

| | 0–1 | 11:24 – Vasilchenko |
| Pérez (Majul, Hagerman) (PP) – 13:17 | 1–1 |
| | 1–2 | 27:11 – Vasilchenko |
| | 1–3 | 46:28 – Vasilchenko (Obolgogiani, Kozyulin) |
| Majul (Gómez, Sierra) – 48:07 | 2–3 |

18 min
Penalties
6 min
37
Shots
35

| 24 April 2019; 13:00 | New Zealand | 6–2 (2–2, 2–0, 2–0) | Georgia | Santa Fe Ice Rink, Mexico City; Attendance: 100 |

Game reference

Richard Parry
Goalies
Andrey Ilyenko
Referee:
(Lithuania) Benas Jakšys
Linesmen:
(Spain) Sergio Biec
(Mexico) Sem Ramírez

| | 0–1 | 00:30 – Kozyulin (Zhuzhunashvili) |
| Craig (Lee) – 10:14 | 1–1 |
| Gavoille (Challis) – 11:47 | 2–1 |
| | 2–2 | 14:16 – Kurbatov (Zhuzhunashvili, Obolgogiani) (PP) |
| Eaden (Challis) (PP) – 31:35 | 3–2 |
| Lee (Challis, Craig) (PP) – 35:24 | 4–2 |
| Heyd (Challis, Lee) (PP) – 47:32 | 5–2 |
| Eaden (Heyd) – 52:35 | 6–2 |

10 min
Penalties
10 min
34
Shots
34

| 24 April 2019; 16:30 | Israel | 9–3 (2–1, 4–1, 3–1) | North Korea | Santa Fe Ice Rink, Mexico City; Attendance: 210 |

Game reference

Nir Tichon
Goalies
Jo Kwan-su
Referee:
(Poland) Tomasz Radzik
Linesmen:
(Czech Republic) Tomáš Brejcha
(Switzerland) Marc-Henri Progin

| Mazour (Sherbatov, Kozhevnikov) (PP) – 03:08 | 1–0 |
| | 1–1 | 04:55 – Hong (Kang I., An) (PP) |
| Sherbatov – 09:44 | 2–1 |
| | 2–2 | 22:55 – Kim H. (Hong) |
| Kozhevnikov (Frenkel) – 24:55 | 3–2 |
| Sherbatov (Hoffman) (SH) – 32:28 | 4–2 |
| Halpert (Kozhevnikov, Frenkel) – 36:02 | 5–2 |
| Sherbatov (PS) – 37:52 | 6–2 |
| Frenkel (Klein, Sherbatov) – 49:50 | 7–2 |
| Geller (Ben Tov) – 52:53 | 8–2 |
| | 8–3 | 53:30 – Kang M. (Jong, Son) |
| Frenkel (Kozhevnikov) – 59:15 | 9–3 |

20 min
Penalties
26 min
33
Shots
25

| 24 April 2019; 20:00 | Iceland | 8–1 (2–0, 6–1, 0–0) | Mexico | Santa Fe Ice Rink, Mexico City; Attendance: 758 |

Game reference

Dennis Hedström
Goalies
Andrés de la Garma
Sebastian de la Vega
Referee:
(Belgium) Tim Tzirtziganis
Linesmen:
(United States) Justin Cornell
(Denmark) Lasse Dahlerup

| Mikaelsson (G. Arason, Sigrunarson) – 07:04 | 1–0 |
| Račanský (G. Arason) – 12:36 | 2–0 |
| | 2–1 | 23:16 – Majul (Pérez) |
| Mikaelsson (Sigrunarson) (PP) – 25:12 | 3–1 |
| Johannesson (G. Arason, Andresson) – 26:03 | 4–1 |
| Orongan – 26:29 | 5–1 |
| Orongan (Sigurðsson) (PP2) – 28:09 | 6–1 |
| Pålsson (Račanský, Orongan) (PP) – 35:01 | 7–1 |
| Mikaelsson – 39:50 | 8–1 |

12 min
Penalties
22 min
46
Shots
23

| 26 April 2019; 13:00 | North Korea | 5–8 (3–2, 1–2, 1–4) | New Zealand | Santa Fe Ice Rink, Mexico City; Attendance: 105 |

Game reference

Jo Kwang-su
Pak Il
Goalies
Vincent Mitalas
Referee:
(United States) Andrew Thackaberry
Linesmen:
(Denmark) Lasse Dahlerup
(Switzerland) Marc-Henri Progin

| Kang I. (Kim Ku.) – 01:20 | 1–0 |
| Hong C. (Ri S.) (SH) — 04:27 | 2–0 |
| Kim H. (Ri C., Kim Kw.) – 07:00 | 3–0 |
| | 3–1 | 13:06 – Schneider (Strayer, Polozov) (PP) |
| | 3–2 | 16:24 – Strayer (Schneider, Cox) (PP) |
| | 3–3 | 20:31 – Schneider (Strayer, Craig) (PP) |
| Kim Kw. (Kim H.) (PP) – 31:49 | 4–3 |
| | 4–4 | 32:18 – Gavoille (Henderson, Challis) |
| Ri S. (Kim Ku.) – 41:05 | 5–4 |
| | 5–5 | 43:40 – Polozov (Cox, Schneider) |
| | 5–6 | 47:02 – Cox (Henderson, Schneider) |
| | 5–7 | 47:33 – Amston (Gavoille, Strayer) |
| | 5–8 | 50:03 – Eaden (Heyd, Mawson) |

14 min
Penalties
10 min
36
Shots
50

| 26 April 2019; 16:30 | Georgia | 6–3 (2–3, 2–0, 2–0) | Iceland | Santa Fe Ice Rink, Mexico City; Attendance: 170 |

Game reference

Andrey Ilyenko
Goalies
Dennis Hedström
Referee:
(Poland) Tomasz Radzik
Linesmen:
(United States) Justin Cornell
(Mexico) Sem Ramírez

| | 0–1 | 07:11 – Račanský (Sigurðsson) |
| | 0–2 | 09:20 – Račanský (Sigurðsson, Orongan) |
| | 0–3 | 11:07 – Orongan (Račanský, Pålsson) (PP) |
| Kozyulin (Zhuzhunashvili) (PP) – 17:33 | 1–3 |
| Zhuzhunashvili (Kozyulin) (PP2) – 19:36 | 2–3 |
| Obolgogiani (Zhuzhunashvili) – 22:05 | 3–3 |
| Kurbatov (Obolgogiani) (PP) – 33:49 | 4–3 |
| Obolgogiani (Kurbatov) (SH) – 52:12 | 5–3 |
| Vasilchenko – 56:04 | 6–3 |

16 min
Penalties
10 min
22
Shots
42

| 26 April 2019; 20:00 | Mexico | 4–5 OT (3–1, 0–3, 1–0) (OT: 0–1) | Israel | Santa Fe Ice Rink, Mexico City; Attendance: 794 |

Game reference

Andrés de la Garma
Goalies
Nir Tichon
Referee:
(Lithuania) Benas Jakšys
Linesmen:
(Slovenia) Anže Bergant
(Spain) Sergio Biec

| Majul (Sierra) – 00:14 | 1–0 |
| | 1–1 | 05:13 – Kozhevnikov (Sherf, Kozevnikov) |
| Gómez (Majul, Sierra) – 14:26 | 2–1 |
| Cruz (Ugarte) (PP) – 18:56 | 3–1 |
| | 3–2 | 24:57 – Vernyy (Klein, Sherbatov) |
| | 3–3 | 28:56 – Klein (Geller, Vernyy) |
| | 3–4 | 30:45 – Sherbatov (Kozhevnikov) |
| Gómez (Majul) – 47:20 | 4–4 |
| | 4–5 | 62:56 – Frenkel (Kozhevnikov, Kozevnikov) (PP) |

12 min
Penalties
10 min
26
Shots
37

| 27 April 2019; 13:00 | Israel | 7–3 (2–1, 4–0, 1–2) | Georgia | Santa Fe Ice Rink, Mexico City; Attendance: 85 |

Game reference

Nir Tichon
Goalies
Andrey Ilyenko
Referee:
(Lithuania) Benas Jakšys
Linesmen:
(Switzerland) Marc-Henri Progin
(Mexico) Sem Ramírez

| | 0–1 | 11:26 – Vasilchenko (Obolgogiani, Kurbatov) (PP) |
| Frenkel (Spivak, Sherbatov) – 14:58 | 1–1 |
| Frenkel (Kozhevnikov, Sherbatov) – 16:30 | 2–1 |
| Sherbatov (Frenkel, Kozhevnikov) – 22:13 | 3–1 |
| Mazour (R. Aharonovich, Halpert) – 22:36 | 4–1 |
| Sherbatov (Kozhevnikov, Spivak) – 34:35 | 5–1 |
| Klein (Sherbatov, Kozhevnikov) (PP) – 36:17 | 6–1 |
| | 6–2 | 41:25 – Kochkin (Kurbatov) |
| | 6–3 | 47:12 – Vasilchenko (Obolgogiani, Zhuzhunashvili) |
| Vernyy (Sherbatov) (SH, EN) – 58:03 | 7–3 |

10 min
Penalties
12 min
28
Shots
32

| 27 April 2019; 16:30 | Iceland | 4–2 (2–0, 2–0, 0–2) | New Zealand | Santa Fe Ice Rink, Mexico City; Attendance: 198 |

Game reference

Snorri Sigurbergsson
Goalies
Richard Parry
Referee:
(Belgium) Tim Tzirtziganis
Linesmen:
(Czech Republic) Tomáš Brejcha
(United States) Justin Cornell

| Andresson (Guðnason) – 09:35 | 1–0 |
| Račanský (Orongan, Blöndal) – 10:35 | 2–0 |
| Mikaelsson (Leifsson, Þorsteinsson) – 20:53 | 3–0 |
| Johannesson (Knútsson) – 26:51 | 4–0 |
| | 4–1 | 44:36 – Cox (Polozov, Lee) (PP) |
| | 4–2 | 59:22 – Schneider (Amston, Henderson) (EA) |

12 min
Penalties
4 min
39
Shots
23

| 27 April 2019; 20:00 | North Korea | 2–8 (1–4, 0–1, 1–3) | Mexico | Santa Fe Ice Rink, Mexico City; Attendance: 752 |

Game reference

Jo Kwang-su
Goalies
Andrés de la Garma
Referee:
(United States) Andrew Thackaberry
Linesmen:
(Slovenia) Anže Bergant
(Denmark) Lasse Dahlerup

| | 0–1 | 01:56 – Majul (L. De la Vega) |
| | 0–2 | 02:58 – Kelo (Sierra) (SH) |
| | 0–3 | 09:46 – Smithers (Ugarte, Chávez) (PP) |
| Kim H. (Kang I.) (PP2) – 12:13 | 1–3 |
| | 1–4 | 13:06 – Majul (Colas, Gómez) |
| | 1–5 | 37:57 – Carrero (Cruz) |
| | 1–6 | 43:19 – Benabib (Smithers, Duenas) |
| | 1–7 | 45:57 – Gómez (Ugarte) (PP) |
| | 1–8 | 56:38 – Chávez (Smithers, Gómez) (PP) |
| Ri S. – 57:31 | 2–8 |

46 min
Penalties
16 min
21
Shots
41

=== Awards and statistics ===
==== Awards ====
- Best players selected by the directorate:
  - Best Goalkeeper: (Iceland) Dennis Hedström
  - Best Defenseman: (New Zealand) Stefan Amston
  - Best Forward: (Israel) Eliezer Sherbatov

Source: IIHF.com

==== Scoring leaders ====
List shows the top skaters sorted by points, then goals.

| Player | GP | G | A | Pts | +/− | PIM | POS |
|---|---|---|---|---|---|---|---|
| (Israel) Eliezer Sherbatov | 5 | 7 | 8 | 15 | +9 | 0 | F |
| (Israel) Evgeni Kozhevnikov | 5 | 5 | 9 | 14 | +6 | 12 | D |
| (Israel) Sergei Frenkel | 5 | 6 | 5 | 11 | +7 | 8 | F |
| (New Zealand) Matthew Schneider | 5 | 5 | 5 | 10 | 0 | 2 | F |
| (Mexico) Héctor Majul | 5 | 6 | 3 | 9 | +3 | 4 | F |
| (North Korea) Hong Chun-rim | 5 | 6 | 2 | 8 | −12 | 2 | F |
| (Iceland) Miloslav Račanský | 5 | 6 | 2 | 8 | +5 | 16 | F |
| (Iceland) Axel Orongan | 5 | 3 | 5 | 8 | +4 | 4 | F |
| (Iceland) Robert Sigurðsson | 5 | 3 | 5 | 8 | +7 | 2 | F |
| (Georgia (country)) Oliver Obolgogiani | 5 | 2 | 6 | 8 | +1 | 8 | F |

GP = Games played; G = Goals; A = Assists; Pts = Points; +/− = Plus/minus; PIM = Penalties in minutes; POS = Position
Source: IIHF.com

==== Goaltending leaders ====
Only the top five goaltenders, based on save percentage, who have played at least 40% of their team's minutes, are included in this list.

| Player | TOI | GA | GAA | SA | Sv% | SO |
|---|---|---|---|---|---|---|
| (New Zealand) Richard Parry | 239:08 | 12 | 3.01 | 131 | 90.84 | 0 |
| (Israel) Nir Tichon | 302:56 | 16 | 3.17 | 146 | 89.04 | 0 |
| (Iceland) Dennis Hedström | 235:17 | 11 | 2.81 | 97 | 88.66 | 1 |
| (Georgia (country)) Andrey Ilyenko | 298:44 | 26 | 5.22 | 182 | 85.71 | 0 |
| (Mexico) Andrés de la Garma | 261:51 | 25 | 5.73 | 157 | 84.08 | 0 |

TOI = Time on ice (minutes:seconds); SA = Shots against; GA = Goals against; GAA = Goals against average; Sv% = Save percentage; SO = Shutouts
Source: IIHF.com
