= 2005 IIHF World U18 Championship Division III =

Tournament details
- Host country: Bulgaria
- Dates: 7 – 13 March 2005
- Teams: 6

The 2005 IIHF World U18 Championship Division III was an international under-18 ice hockey tournament run by the International Ice Hockey Federation. The Division III tournament made up the fourth level of competition at the 2005 IIHF World U18 Championships and took place between 7 and 13 March 2005 in Sofia, Bulgaria. The tournament was won by Australia who upon winning gained promotion, along with Belgium who finished in second place, to Division II of the 2006 IIHF World U18 Championships.

== Overview ==
The 2005 IIHF World U18 Championship Division III began on 7 March 2005 in Sofia, Bulgaria. Bulgaria, Israel and New Zealand returned to compete in the Division III competition after missing promotion at the previous years World Championships. Australia and Belgium entered the Division III competition after being relegated from the Division II tournaments of the 2004 IIHF World U18 Championships and Turkey returned to Division III after winning the 2005 IIHF World U18 Championship Division III Qualification tournament that was held the previous month in Ankara, Turkey.

Australia finished first after winning all five of their games and gained promotion to Division II of the 2006 IIHF World U18 Championships. Belgium who finished in second placed also gained promotion to Division II and Israel finished in third place after losing only to Australia and Belgium. Oren Zamir of Israel finished as the tournaments top scorer after recording 17 points including ten goals and seven assists. Australia's Dahlen Phillips finished as the tournaments leading goaltender with a save percentage of 94.37.

== Standings ==
Pos	Team	Pld	W	D	L	GF	GA	GD	Pts	Promotion
1	Australia	5	5	0	0	46	6	+40	10	Promoted to Division II for 2006
2	Belgium	5	4	0	1	34	8	+26	8	Promoted to Division II for 2006
3	Israel	5	3	0	2	36	15	+21	6	
4	New Zealand	5	2	0	3	22	17	+5	4	
5	Turkey	5	1	0	4	6	51	−45	2	
6	Bulgaria	5	0	0	5	6	53	−47	0	

=== Fixtures ===
All times local.

7 March 2005; 12:00	Israel	7–2 (4–0, 1–1, 2–1)	New Zealand	Winter Sports Palace; Attendance: 90

Game reference

7 March 2005; 15:30	Bulgaria	2–13 (1–4, 1–1, 0–8)	Australia	Winter Sports Palace; Attendance: 200

Game reference

7 March 2005; 19:00	Turkey	0–11 (0–2, 0–7, 0–2)	Belgium	Winter Sports Palace; Attendance: 112

Game reference

8 March 2005; 12:00	Belgium	11–1 (4–0, 4–1, 3–0)	Bulgaria	Winter Sports Palace; Attendance: 86

Game reference

8 March 2005; 15:30	Australia	7–2 (1–1, 3–1, 3–0)	Israel	Winter Sports Palace; Attendance: 50

Game reference

8 March 2005; 8 March 2005	New Zealand	11–0 (5–0, 2–0, 4–0)	Turkey	Winter Sports Palace; Attendance: 60

Game reference

10 March 2005; 12:00	Belgium	5–2 (1–2, 2–0, 2–0)	Israel	Winter Sports Palace; Attendance: 50

Game reference

10 March 2005; 15:30	Australia	4–1 (1–0, 2–0, 1–1)	New Zealand	Winter Sports Palace; Attendance: 60

Game reference

10 March 2005; 19:00	Turkey	6–2 (2–0, 1–0, 3–2)	Bulgaria	Winter Sports Palace; Attendance: 220

Game reference

12 March 2005; 12:00	New Zealand	1–6 (0–1, 1–0, 0–5)	Belgium	Winter Sports Palace; Attendance: 60

Game reference

12 March 2005; 15:30	Bulgaria	1–16 (1–4, 0–5, 0–7)	Israel	Winter Sports Palace; Attendance: 250

Game reference

12 March 2005; 19:00	Australia	18–0 (5–0, 7–0, 6–0)	Turkey	Winter Sports Palace; Attendance: 60

Game reference

13 March 2005; 12:00	Belgium	1–4 (0–2, 0–1, 1–1)	Australia	Winter Sports Palace; Attendance: 60

Game reference

13 March 2005; 15:30	New Zealand	7–0 (1–0, 2–0, 4–0)	Bulgaria	Winter Sports Palace; Attendance: 115

Game reference

13 March 2005; 19:00	Israel	9–0 (3–0, 2–0, 4–0)	Turkey	Winter Sports Palace; Attendance: 55

Game reference

== Scoring leaders ==
List shows the top ten skaters sorted by points, then goals.

Player	GP	G	A	Pts	+/−	PIM	POS
(Israel) Oren Zamir	5	10	7	17	+9	16	F
(Israel) Michael Horwitz	5	8	6	14	+11	6	F
(Australia) David Manning	5	7	5	12	+11	14	F
(Australia) Ryan Walker	5	6	4	10	+10	6	F
(Israel) Yogev Shamir	5	3	7	10	+6	2	D
(Belgium) Seppe Sysmans	5	6	3	9	+9	4	F
(Belgium) Didier Vaeyens	5	6	3	9	+8	14	F
(Australia) Tomas Manco	5	5	4	9	+14	4	D
(Israel) Eli Sherbatov	5	4	5	9	+1	4	F
(Belgium) Ben Vercammen	5	3	6	9	+10	8	F

== Leading goaltenders ==
Only the top five goaltenders, based on save percentage, who have played 40% of their team's minutes are included in this list.

Player	MIP	SOG	GA	GAA	SVS%	SO
(Australia) Dahlen Phillips	180:00	71	4	1.33	94.37	0
(Belgium) Bram de Backer	240:00	85	7	1.75	91.76	1
(Israel) Ilan Kilimnik	260:00	99	15	3.46	84.85	1
(New Zealand) Zak Nothling	145:04	81	13	5.38	83.95	0
(Australia) Peter Haywood	120:00	12	2	1.00	83.33	1
