= 2005 IIHF World U18 Championship Division III Qualification =

Tournament details
- Host country: Turkey
- Dates: 18 – 20 February 2005
- Teams: 3

Final positions
- Champions: Turkey

The 2005 IIHF World U18 Championship Division III Qualification was an international under-18 ice hockey tournament run by the International Ice Hockey Federation. The Division III Qualification fifth level of competition at the 2005 IIHF World U18 Championships and took place between 18 and 20 February 2005 in Ankara, Turkey. The tournament was won by Turkey who upon winning qualified to compete in the 2005 IIHF World U18 Championship Division III that was held in Sofia, Bulgaria.

== Overview ==
The 2005 IIHF World U18 Championship Division III Qualification began on 18 February 2005 in Ankara, Turkey. Bosnia and Herzegovina and Turkey entered the Division III Qualification tournament after being relegated from the Division III tournament of the 2004 IIHF World U18 Championships, while Armenia made their debut at the World U18 Championships.

Turkey finished first after winning both of their games and qualified to compete in the 2005 IIHF World U18 Championship Division III that was set to be held in Sofia, Bulgaria the following month. Bosnia and Herzegovina finished in second place after winning their game against Armenia. Muamer Dzamalija of Bosnia and Herzegovina finished as the tournaments top scorer after recording eight points including three goals and five assists. Turkey's Baris Ucele finished as the tournaments leading goaltender with a save percentage of 89.19.

== Standings ==
Pos	Team	Pld	W	D	L	GF	GA	GD	Pts	Qualification
1	Turkey	2	2	0	0	21	4	+17	4	Qualified for the 2005 Division III tournament
2	Bosnia and Herzegovina	2	1	0	1	15	9	+6	2	
3	Armenia	2	0	0	2	4	27	−23	0	

=== Fixtures ===
All times local.

18 February 2005; 19:00	Turkey	15 – 1 (6–0, 6–1, 3–0)	Armenia	GSGM Buz Pateni Sarayi; Attendance: 500

Game reference

19 February 2005; 19:00	Armenia	3 – 12 (0–3, 3–5, 0–4)	Bosnia and Herzegovina	GSGM Buz Pateni Sarayi; Attendance: 300

Game reference

20 February 2005; 19:00	Bosnia and Herzegovina	3 – 6 (1–3, 1–2, 1–1)	Turkey	GSGM Buz Pateni Sarayi; Attendance: 600

Game reference

== Scoring leaders ==
List shows the top ten skaters sorted by points, then goals.

Player	GP	G	A	Pts	+/−	PIM	POS
(Bosnia and Herzegovina) Muamer Dzamalija	2	3	5	8	+3	14	F
(Turkey) Alper Solak	2	3	3	6	+5	4	F
(Turkey) Baris Bilgic	2	0	5	5	+5	12	D
(Armenia) Hovnan Markosyan	2	4	0	4	-12	10	F
(Turkey) Volkan Toptaner	2	3	1	4	+3	0	F
(Bosnia and Herzegovina) Armen Velic	2	3	1	4	-1	4	F
(Turkey) Ferit Barutcu	2	2	2	4	+5	4	D
(Bosnia and Herzegovina) Armin Mesanovic	2	1	3	4	0	2	F
(Turkey) Caner Baykan	2	1	3	4	+4	8	F
(Turkey) Batin Kosemen	2	3	0	3	+5	2	F

== Leading goaltenders ==
Only the top goaltenders, based on save percentage, who have played 40% of their team's minutes are included in this list.

Player	MIP	SOG	GA	GAA	SVS%	SO
(Turkey) Baris Ucele	120:00	37	4	2.00	89.19	0
(Bosnia and Herzegovina) Safet Cosovic	120:00	51	9	4.50	82.35	0
(Armenia) Harutyun Baluyan	120:00	114	27	13.50	76.32	0
