= Daniel Bochner =

Canadian ice hockey player and coach

- Born: September 5, 1984 (age 42) Toronto, Ontario, Canada
- Height: 6 ft 1 in (185 cm)
- Weight: 201 lb (91 kg; 14 st 5 lb)
- Position: Defence
- Shot: Left
- Current KHL coach: SKA Saint Petersburg (Assistant)
- National team: Israel
- Playing career: 1998–2011
- Coaching career: 2018–present

Daniel Bochner (born September 5, 1984) is a Canadian professional ice hockey coach and a former player. Since 2018, he has served as the player development coach for the Ice Hockey Federation of Russia and SKA Saint Petersburg hockey club in the KHL.

== Early life ==
Bochner was born on September 5, 1984, in Toronto, Ontario, Canada.

== Playing career ==
Bochner started playing for the Israel's Under-18 in 1998. In the national junior team he participated in the U18 World Championships of the Europe Division II in 1999 and 2000, as well as the IIHF World U20 Championship Division III in 2001.

From 2000 to 2011, he played for the Israel national ice hockey team (coached by Boris Mindel and Jean Perron). Bochner played at several world championships. His last word championship with the team was at the 2011 IIHF World Championship Division III in Cape Town, South Africa, in April 2011. Playing for the Israeli team in IIHF Division II and III tournaments, he won 2 gold, 2 silver and 2 bronze medals.

At the age of 17, he started playing for a number of Canadian junior hockey clubs: Lindsay Muskies (2001–2002), Ajax Axemen (2002-2004), Thornhill Thunderbirds (2004-2005), and Niagara Falls Canucks (2005–2006). After completing the season he moved to Europe and started playing for a newly formed HK Beostar adult team. He then moved to Nice hockey Côte d'Azur and was with the club when it became the champion of FFHG Division 2 in 2007-2008.

=== Coaching career ===
In 2010, having retired from playing professional hockey in Europe, he established Universal Hockey, an academy where hockey players can improve their skills starting from 6 years. He also worked with several ice hockey players as personal coach. The training program was developed by Bochner himself, based on his experience.

In Canada, he worked as a head coach of a number of teams in the Greater Toronto Hockey League and also as a high performance skills coach at Hockey Canada, a national governing body of ice hockey and ice sledge hockey. In 2018, he took the role of the director of the player development at the Russian Ice Hockey Federation, where he is responsible for the men’s and women’s Olympic and national teams. Also since 2018, he is the skills development coach for the SKA Saint Petersburg club and heads the “Red Machine”, a national hockey development program which trains coaches throughout the country.
