= Eliezer Sherbatov =

Israeli-Canadian ice hockey player (born 1991)

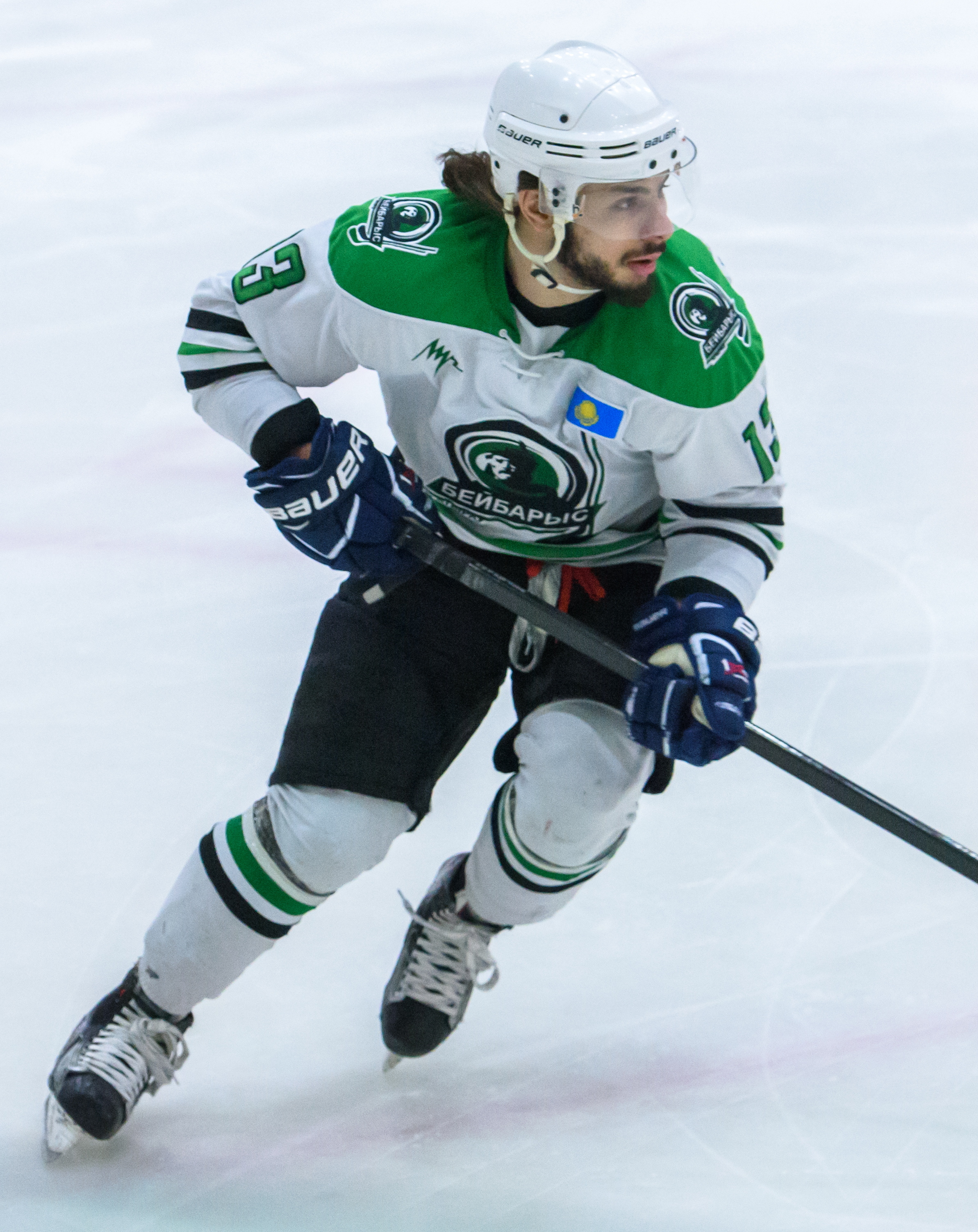
- Sherbatov with Beibarys Atyrau in 2017
- Born: 9 October 1991 (age 34) Rehovot, Israel
- Height: 5 ft 7 in (170 cm)
- Weight: 193 lb (88 kg; 13 st 11 lb)
- Position: Left wing
- Shoots: Left
- team Former teams: Jonquière Marquis; HC Mariupol; Bisons de Neuilly-sur-Marne; HC Astana; HC Beibarys; HC Slovan Bratislava; Berlin Blackjacks; HC Košice; Unia Oswiecim
- National team: Israel
- NHL draft: Undrafted
- Playing career: 2009–present

Eliezer "Elie" Alexeevich Sherbatov (Hebrew: אליעזר שרבטוב, Russian: Элиэзер Алексеевич Шербатов; born 9 October 1991) is an Israeli-Canadian ice hockey player who plays for the Jonquière Marquis of the Ligue Nord-Américaine de Hockey, after having played for HC Mariupol of the Ukrainian Hockey League until the Russian invasion in February 2022. In the 2020-2021 season he played for TH Unia Oświęcim of the Polska Hokej Liga. He is the first Israeli to have played in the Russian Kontinental Hockey League, for HC Slovan Bratislava. His biography, published in both French and English (My Left Skate: The Extraordinary Story of Eliezer Sherbatov, and Sherbatov: Le garçon qui voulait jouer au hockey) was written by Anna Rosner and released on October 12, 2022.

Sherbatov, who is Jewish, moved with his family from Israel to Laval, Quebec, Canada, just after his first birthday. His parents were originally from Moscow, Russia and fans of the Montreal Canadiens. His family was permitted entry into Canada by immigration officials because his father said he wanted one of his sons to skate like Guy Lafleur.

He spent the 2008–09 season with Laval-Bourassa Rousseau Sports of the Quebec Midget AAA Hockey League, and was third in the league in scoring. Sherbatov spent the 2012-13 season, when he was 20 years old, with the Bisons de Neuilly-sur-Marne, and was third in the French Magnus League in assists. In 2015-16 Sherbatov played with Beibarys Atyrau in the Kazakhstan Hockey Championship, and was third in the league in assists. In 2019-20 he played for Yertis Pavlodar, and was second in the Kazakhstan Hockey Championship in points.

Sherbatov has played for the Israel men's national ice hockey team, drawing international attention when he first played in the 2005 IIHF World U18 championship Division III at the age of 13, becoming the youngest player to step on the ice in an under-18 world championship. At the 2011 IIHF World Championship Division III, when he was 19 years old, he led the tournament in points, goals, assists, and +/-, and was named the best forward of the tournament. Since 2019 he has been captain of the national team. In 2019, he starred for the team as it won the gold medal in the 2019 IIHF World Championship Division II Group IIB tournament, and was named Best Forward, as he had the best +/- rating, was the top goal scorer, and was the top scorer.

== Early life ==
Sherbatov was born in Rehovot, Israel, to parents Anna and Alexei in a Russian Jewish family. He had a bar mitzvah. His mother had been a Russian figure skating champion as a teen and is a power-skating coach in Quebec. His father (originally from Dagestan) had been an engineer and a wrestler, and his parents immigrated to Israel from Moscow. During the Holocaust, some of his father’s relatives were killed at a Nazi concentration camp. Eliezer is the youngest child. His older brother Yoni Sherbatov is a professional MMA fighter, and he has another older brother named Boris who is a wrestling champion.

Just after his first birthday, he moved with his family from Israel to LaSalle, in Quebec, Canada. Sherbatov is a dual Israeli-Canadian citizen. His father was a big fan of the Montreal Canadiens. The immigration service granted Canadian visas to his family only after his father stated that he wanted his son to skate like number 10, Guy Lafleur.

Sherbatov graduated from Laval's École secondaire Georges-Vanier, and then took CEGEP courses by long distance. He grew up in Montreal, Quebec.

Undrafted by the NHL as a teen, Sherbatov persevered in Europe and dreamed of reaching the Kontinental Hockey League. In 2017, he became the first Israeli to play in the KHL.

== Playing career ==
=== Junior ===
In 2005, Sherbatov finished first in the province in peewee Double-A scoring.

At the age of 13, Sherbatov made his debut with the Israeli National Ice Hockey team. In the 2004/05 season the team won a bronze medal in the IIHF U-18 World Championship. He is the youngest player to ever participate in this tournament.

At 14 years of age he had a rollerblading accident, seriously injured his left leg and knee, bones and nerves, developed drop foot, and had three surgeries. Sherbatov plays hockey with no sensation below his knee. After the accident, he had to take a 2.5 year layoff from hockey. He still has to wear a brace at all times when off the ice.

In 2008, Sherbatov attended training camp with the Montreal Junior Hockey Club in the Quebec Major Junior Hockey League. He spent the 2008–09 season with Laval-Bourassa Rousseau Sports of the Quebec Midget AAA Hockey League, leading the team in scoring. He had 61 points (29 goals + 32 assists) in 45 games, and was third in the league in scoring. In the playoffs, he helped the team win the championship while leading the playoffs with 15 goals in 18 games.

Sherbatov began playing major junior hockey in Canada during the 2009–10 season with the Montreal Junior Hockey Club, playing in 62 games and recording 30 points (12 goals + 18 assists). He played 37 games with Montreal again in 2010–11, before being traded to the Baie-Comeau Drakkar in the Quebec Major Junior Hockey League for 21 games, finishing with 15 points combined (6 goals + 9 assists) for the season.

=== Professional ===
==== France ====
Sherbatov spent the 2011-12 season, when he was 19 years old, with the Bisons de Neuilly-sur-Marne team, playing in the Magnus League. Over the season, he scored 14 points (6 goals + 8 assists) in 24 games. Despite the fact that Neuilly-sur-Marne left the elite division following the season, Sherbatov signed a one-year contract extension with the club.

The second season in Neuilly-sur-Marne was a productive one for Sherbatov, as he had an average of 2.04 points per game, 8th-best in the league. He finished 6th in league scoring with 51 points, and 3rd in assists with 31. He also finished first in goals, assists, and points on his team. At the end of the season Sherbatov was leased to the junior club Français Volants in Paris. He played three games for the Volants in the playoffs, in which he scored 8 points (4 goals + 4 assists). He was the key player for the team's victory in the playoffs.

==== Kazakhstan ====
From the 2013-14 season through the 2016-17 season, Sherbatov played in the Kazakhstan Hockey Championship, starting with a season with HC Astana which saw him finish tied for first on the team in points with 40 (16 goals and 24 assists).

After a dip in production in his first season with Beibarys Atyrau in 2014-15, he bounced back in 2015-16 with the best totals in his years in Kazakhstan, leading the team in points with 45 (in 53 games), and finishing third in the entire league in assists with 33 during the regular season, which saw Beibarys finish second. During the 15-game playoffs, Sherbatov played a vital role in their championship win, leading the team in goals (6), points (10), and plus-minus (+8) - he finished fourth in points, second in goals, and first in plus-minus in the Kazakhstani playoffs on the whole.

Sherbatov led Beibarys in scoring for a second consecutive regular season in 2016-17, finishing seventh in the league with 43 points (15 goals + 28 assists), but Beibarys exited the playoffs quite early, and that summer, he left for Slovakia.

He briefly returned to Kazakhstan in the 2018-19 season, as he moved to Arlan Kokshetau, but never actually played a game for the team before leaving a month later. In 2019-20 Sherbatov played for Yertis Pavlodar in the Kazakhstan Vyschaya Liga, and in 49 games was second in the league with 55 points (30 goals (2nd) + 25 assists), and second with 1.12 points per game.

==== Slovakia ====
Sherbatov first played in Slovakia in the 2017-18 season. He signed with HC Slovan Bratislava, becoming the first Israeli to play in the KHL, scoring a goal and 3 assists in 35 games. In February 2019, after brief stints in North America (Berlin Blackjacks//North Petroliers; 5 games and 5 points) and Latvia (HK Kurbads of the Latvian Hockey Higher League), and the aforementioned no-games stint with Arlan, Sherbatov moved to HC Košice, making his team debut in a 3–2 win over HC Nové Zámky, and scoring his first goal in a 5–1 loss against HC '05 Banská Bystrica. In 8 games for the team, he scored 4 points.

==== Poland ====
In June 2020 Sherbatov signed one-year contract with Polish club Unia Oświęcim in the Polska Hokej Liga, located in the city of Oświęcim in southern Poland. The team plays just a short walk from the site of the Auschwitz concentration camp, where one million Jews were killed by the Nazis during the Holocaust. He said, "I have a great deal of motivation because it is Auschwitz. I want to win the championship, the Polish Cup and the continental title, and then everyone will know the one who did this is a Jewish-Israeli." His father told him "to work hard, to show his lion’s heart, and to be proud of Israel and show people we are still alive."

==== Ukraine ====
On July 29, 2021, Sherbatov signed with HC Mariupol of the Ukrainian Hockey League. After Andriy Deniskin committed a racist act against American defenceman Jalen Smereck during a game, Sherbatov publicly criticized the league for their lack of action and weak sanctions against Deniskin. Upon the beginning of the 2022 Russian invasion of Ukraine, Sherbatov found himself trapped in a city north of Mariupol before being aided by Israeli diplomats and members of the hockey community. He had earlier appealed to the Canadian Global Affairs Agency consular service for Ukraine for help leaving the country, but received a form letter in reply.

==== Canada ====
On August 8, 2022, the Jonquière Marquis of the Ligue Nord-Américaine de Hockey, a professional league in Quebec, announced that Sherbatov would line up with the team for the 2022-23 season. Sherbatov played his first regular season game on October 7. In his second game, the home opener for the Marquis on October 8 against Rivière-du-Loup, he scored 3 goals and earned an assist. He was awarded the first star of Week 1 in the LNAH, with a total of 3 goals and 2 assists in 2 games.

== International play; Team Israel ==
=== 2005-09 ===
Sherbatov has played extensively for the Israel men's national ice hockey team, drawing international attention when he first played in the 2005 IIHF World U18 championship Division III, in Bulgaria, at the age of 13, becoming the youngest player to step on the ice in an under-18 world championship. He scored 9 points (4 goals + 5 assists) in 5 games, as the team won a bronze medal, Israel's first in hockey in a championship tournament.

He played again with the under-18 team in 2006 and 2008. In the 2006 IIHF World U18 Championship, in Romania, Sherbatov scored 14 points (6 goals + 8 assists), which helped the team to rise to the second division by winning the silver medal. Sherbatov's next participation in the 2008 IIHF World U18 Championship Division II, in Estonia, ended with the return of the Israeli team to the third division.

=== 2010-present ===
Sherbatov started playing with the senior national team at the 2010 IIHF World Championship Division II in Estonia at age 19. He scored 6 points (3 goals + 3 assists) in five games, which did not save the Israeli team from relegation to the third division.

Sherbatov became an internet sensation after scoring a highlight goal against Greece at the 2011 IIHF World Championship Division III, in Cape Town, South Africa, when he was 19 years old. On a breakaway, he pulled the puck back between his skates, and then flipped the puck forward into the air, and batted it back-handed into the net, top shelf, over a lunging Greek goaltender. The goal was featured on TSN's "Top 10: Creative Goals" reel, and ranked fourth all-time. Sherbatov led the tournament in points, goals, assists, and +/-, earning 26 points (14 goals + 12 assists) in just four games. He was named the best forward of the tournament. Israel won all five of its games by a combined score of 57–9, and was promoted to the IIHF Division II WHC to be played in 2012.

At the 2012 IIHF World Championship Division II tournament in Bulgaria, Sherbatov again excelled, gaining 14 points (5 goals + 9 assists) which helped the Israeli team stay in the second division. Sherbatov stepped on the ice for the national team for the 2014 World Championship Division II, in Serbia, where he put up 9 points (3 goals + 6 assists) in 5 games. Since 2015 he has been the captain of the national team.

In 2019, he starred for the team as it won the gold medal in the 2019 IIHF World Championship Division II Group B tournament in Mexico City, Israel's first gold medal in hockey. Sherbatov was named Best Forward, and had the best +/- rating, was the top goal scorer, and was the top scorer with 15 points (7 goals + 8 assists) in 5 games. With the win, the team qualified for the 2020 IIHF World Championship Division 2A.

Sherbatov has said that he would like to finish his career in Israel.

== Career statistics ==
=== Regular season and playoffs ===
| | | | Regular season | | | | | Playoffs |
| Season | Team | League | GP | G | A | Pts | PIM | GP | G | A | Pts | PIM |
|---|---|---|---|---|---|---|---|---|---|---|---|---|
| 2004–05 | HC Metulla | Israel | — | — | — | — | — | — | — | — | — | — |
| 2005–06 | HC Metulla | Israel | — | — | — | — | — | — | — | — | — | — |
| 2006–07 | HC Metulla | Israel | — | — | — | — | — | — | — | — | — | — |
| 2007–08 | HC Metulla | Israel | — | — | — | — | — | — | — | — | — | — |
| 2008–09 | Laval-Bourassa Rousseau | QMAAA | 45 | 29 | 32 | 61 | 30 | 18 | 15 | 3 | 18 | 14 |
| 2009–10 | Montreal Junior HC | QMJHL | 62 | 12 | 18 | 30 | 12 | 7 | 1 | 3 | 4 | 2 |
| 2010–11 | Montreal Junior HC | QMJHL | 37 | 3 | 6 | 9 | 17 | — | — | — | — | — |
| 2010–11 | Baie-Comeau Drakkar | QMJHL | 21 | 3 | 3 | 6 | 0 | — | — | — | — | — |
| 2011–12 | Bisons de Neuilly-sur-Marne | FRA | 20 | 5 | 7 | 12 | 12 | 4 | 1 | 1 | 2 | 0 |
| 2012–13 | Bisons de Neuilly-sur-Marne | FRA.1 | 25 | 20 | 31 | 51 | 12 | 2 | 0 | 1 | 1 | 2 |
| 2013–14 | HC Astana | KHC | 51 | 16 | 24 | 40 | 16 | 4 | 0 | 1 | 1 | 12 |
| 2014–15 | Beibarys Atyrau | KHC | 51 | 5 | 12 | 17 | 44 | 15 | 4 | 1 | 5 | 6 |
| 2015–16 | Beibarys Atyrau | KHC | 53 | 12 | 33 | 45 | 24 | 15 | 6 | 4 | 10 | 4 |
| 2016–17 | Beibarys Atyrau | KHC | 46 | 15 | 28 | 43 | 22 | 2 | 0 | 1 | 1 | 0 |
| 2017–18 | HC Slovan Bratislava | KHL | 35 | 1 | 3 | 4 | 33 | — | — | — | — | — |
| KHL totals | | | 35 | 1 | 3 | 4 | 33 | — | — | — | — | — |

=== International ===
| Year | National Team | Tournament | Place | GP | G. | A | TP | PIM | +/− |
| 2005 | Israel (U18) | IIHF World U18 Championship Div.III | 3 | 5 | 4 | 5 | 9 | 4 | 1 |
| 2006 | Israel (U18) | IIHF World U18 Championship Div.III | 2^{↑} | 5 | 6 | 8 | 14 | 8 | 5 |
| 2008 | Israel (U18) | IIHF World U18 Championship Div.II | 6_{↓} | 5 | 2 | 2 | 4 | 8 | -24 |
| 2010 | Israel | IIHF World Championship Div.II | 6_{↓} | 5 | 3 | 3 | 6 | 12 | -11 |
| 2011 | Israel | IIHF World Championship Div.III | 1^{↑} | 4 | 14 | 12 | 26 | 0 | 22 |
| 2012 | Israel | IIHF World Championship Div.II | 5 | 5 | 9 | 5 | 14 | 0 | 6 |
| 2014 | Israel | IIHF World Championship Div.II | 6_{↓} | 5 | 3 | 6 | 9 | 2 | -8 |
| Total (Junior) | | | | 15 | 12 | 15 | 27 | 20 | -18 |
| Total (Men) | | | | 19 | 29 | 25 | 53 | 10 | 9 |

== See also ==
- List of select Jewish ice hockey players
