= 2011 IIHF World Championship Division III =

International ice hockey tournament

Tournament details
- Host country: South Africa
- Venue: 1 (in 1 host city)
- Dates: 11 April – 17 April
- Teams: 6

The 2011 IIHF World Championship Division III was an international ice hockey tournament run by the International Ice Hockey Federation. The tournament was contested between 11–17 April 2011 in Cape Town, South Africa. Prior to the start of the tournament, the Mongolian national team announced they would withdraw, citing financial reasons. All games against them were counted as a forfeit, with a score of 5–0 for the opposing team.

The UAE decided to withdraw from the 2011 Division III tournament in Cape Town, South Africa because they refused to compete against Israel, who was also in the tournament.

Israel won all five of its games by a combined score of 57-9, and was promoted to the 2012 IIHF World Championship Division II. Israel's Eliezer Sherbatov led the tournament in points, goals, assists, and +/-, earning 26 points (14 goals + 12 assists) in four games. He was named the best forward of the tournament.

== Participants ==
Team	Qualification
Greece	Placed 2nd in Division III A last year.
Israel	Placed 6th in Division II Group B and were relegated in 2010.
Luxembourg	Placed 3rd in Division III A last year.
Mongolia	Placed 3rd in Division III B last year. (withdrew from tournament)
South Africa	Host, Placed 2nd in Division III B last year.
Turkey	Placed 6th in Division II Group A and were relegated in 2010.

== Tournament ==
=== Standings ===
Promoted to Division II for 2012

Rk	Team	GP	W	OTW	OTL	L	GF	GA	GDF	PTS
1	Israel	5	4	1	0	0	57	9	+48	14
2	South Africa	5	4	0	1	0	43	9	+34	13
3	Turkey	5	3	0	0	2	29	25	+4	9
4	Luxembourg	5	2	0	0	3	33	22	+11	6
5	Greece	5	1	0	0	4	7	79	−72	3
6	Mongolia	5	0	0	0	5	0	25	−25	0

=== Fixtures ===
All times local.

11 April 2011; 13:00	Turkey	5–0 (forfeit)	Mongolia	Grandwest Ice Arena

11 April 2011; 16:15	Greece	0–20 (0–5, 0–7, 0–8)	Luxembourg	Grandwest Ice Arena; Attendance: 140

Game reference

Pantelis Magklaras
Alexandros Moirasgetis
Goalies
Philippe Lepage
Referee:
(Ukraine) Maksym Urda
Linesmen:
(Netherlands) Jos Korte
(Kazakhstan) Arkadiy Subbotin

0–1	03:42 – P. Bechtold (G. Scheier, K. Linster) (SH)
0–2	06:46 – F. Schons (R. Beran, T. Beran) (PP)
0–3	10:57 – P. Schon (C. Mossong)
0–4	16:21 – T. Beran (R. Beran) (SH)
0–5	19:02 – T. Beran (R. Beran, F. Schons)
0–6	21:36 – T. Beran (R. Beran, G. Biver)
0–7	22:35 – R. Beran (T. Beran, S. Minden)
0–8	23:43 – Y. Dessouroux (P. Schon)
0–9	24:46 – R. Beran (T. Beran)
0–10	26:23 – Y. Dessouroux (C. Mossong, Y. Barthels)
0–11	27:44 – P. Schon (C. Mossong)
0–12	32:56 – P. Schon (C. Mossong)
0–13	41:31 – S. Minden (T. Beran, R. Beran)
0–14	46:11 – S. Backes (P. Schon)
0–15	46:32 – R. Scheier (B. Welter, S. Backes)
0–16	53:16 – B. Schneider (P. Schon) (PP)
0–17	53:46 – R. Beran (T. Beran, C. Mossong)
0–18	55:54 – B. Welter (G. Scheier)
0–19	57:24 – T. Beran (R. Beran, F. Schons)
0–20	57:55 – S. Backes (B. Welter)

43 min
Penalties
45 min
13
Shots
60

11 April 2011; 21:45	South Africa	5 – 6 OT (2–1, 2–2, 1–2) (OT: 0–1)	Israel	Grandwest Ice Arena; Attendance: 851

Game reference

Ashley Bock
Goalies
Avihu Sorotzki
Referee:
(Italy) Claudio Pianezze
Linesmen:
(Italy) Ulrich Pardatscher
(Denmark) Jacques Riisom-Birker

C. Birrell (B. Matthews) (PP2) – 02:24	1–0
G. Lyon (B. Matthews) (PP) – 06:57	2–0
	2–1	12:13 – D. Bochner (D. Mazour, S. Norman) (PP)
D. Magmoed (M. Giot) – 24:53	3–1
	3–2	26:23 – D. Mazour (S. Norman)
A. Marais (G. Yates, G. Miller) – 33:22	4–2
	4–3	37:32 – A. Geller (D. Mazour) (PP)
	4–4	41:08 – S. Frenkel (D. Spivak)
C. Birrell (C. Engelbrecht) – 41:33	5–4
	5–5	55:10 – E. Sherbatov (D. Mazour) (PP)
	5–6	63:51 – E. Sherbatov (D. Mazour)

22 min
Penalties
20 min
36
Shots
37

12 April 2011; 13:00	Mongolia	0–5 (forfeit)	Greece	Grandwest Ice Arena

12 April 2011; 16:15	Israel	11–1 (4–0, 4–0, 3–1)	Luxembourg	Grandwest Ice Arena; Attendance: 56

Game reference

Avihu Sorotzki
Boris Amromin
Goalies
Philippe Lepage
Referee:
(Belgium) Chris Deweerdt
Linesmen:
(South Africa) Nickolas Beukes
(South Korea) Seung Won Jung

E. Sherbatov (D. Spivak D. Bochner) (PP) – 02:47	1–0
D. Mazour (S. Frenkel) (PP) – 06:33	2–0
E. Sherbatov (A. Geller, S. Frenkel) (PP) – 11:01	3–0
D. Mazour (S. Norman, M. Lebedev) – 16:27	4–0
E. Sherbatov (D. Spivak, R. Oz) (SH) – 23:45	5–0
S. Norman (D. Mazour, S. Frenkel) – 25:43	6–0
S. Frenkel (A. Geller, E. Sherbatov) – 27:02	7–0
S. Frenkel (E. Sherbatov) – 39:31	8–0
D. Mazour (T. Avneri, D. Bochner) – 42:14	9–0
A. Geller (S. Frenkel, S. Cooper) – 47:34	10–0
	10–1	52:23 – B. Welter (G. Scheier)
E. Sherbatov (D. Spivak, R. Oz) (SH) – 55:34	11–1

10 min
Penalties
29 min
38
Shots
25

12 April 2011; 21:45	Turkey	1–11 (0–5, 1–3, 0–3)	South Africa	Grandwest Ice Arena; Attendance: 738

Game reference

Levent Ozbaydugan
Fikri Atali
Goalies
David Berger
Referee:
(Russia) Mikhal Buturlin
Linesmen:
(Bulgaria) Mikulash Furnadziev
(Denmark) Jacques Riisom-Birker

	0–1	00:41 – D. Cardoso (M. Giot D. Magmoed)
	0–2	08:31 – G. Yates (M. Giot)
	0–3	11:41 – B. Matthews (C. Engelbrecht) (PP)
	0–4	13:41 – C. Engelbrecht (C. Birrell) (PP)
	0–5	14:23 – D. Magmoed (D. Cardoso, M. Giot)
C. Baykan (PP) – 24:00	1–5
	1–6	25:25 – C. Birrell (D. Cardoso)
	1–7	30:18 – D. Magmoed (U. Samaai) (PP)
	1–8	37:59 – C. Engelbrecht (A. Marais, C. Birrell) (PP)
	1–9	47:59 – J. Valadas (B. Matthews, G. Miller)
	1–10	56:07 – C. Nebe (C. Birrell, J. Valadas)
	1–11	57:22 – M. Giot

16 min
Penalties
16 min
31
Shots
67

14 April 2011; 13:00	Israel	5–0 (forfeit)	Mongolia	Grandwest Ice Arena

14 April 2011; 16:00	Turkey	16–0 (6–0, 4–0, 6–0)	Greece	Grandwest Ice Arena; Attendance: 113

Game reference

Levent Ozbaydugan
Goalies
Pantelis Magklaras
Alexandros Moirasgetis
Referee:
(Italy) Claudio Pianezze
Linesmen:
(Netherlands) Jos Korte
(Italy) Ulrich Pardatscher

G. Tasdemir (F. Güçlü, C. Akyıldız) – 01:31	1–0
D. Ince (E. Ozmen, S. Aktürk) (PP) – 06:24	2–0
Y. Halil (S. Yildirim) – 07:21	3–0
O. Yavuzarslan (S. Yildirim) – 08:15	4–0
O. Yavuzarslan (S. Yildirim) – 13:53	5–0
E. Ozmen (S. Aktürk) – 14:14	6–0
Y. Halil (S. Gumus, S. Aktürk) (PP) – 25:07	7–0
G. Tasdemir (S. Gumus) – 26:16	8–0
E. Coskun (S. Aktürk) – 32:33	9–0
S. Aktürk (E. Coskun) (SH) – 33:32	10–0
C. Akyıldız (S. Gumus, A. Solak) – 42:03	11–0
S. Aktürk – 46:31	12–0
O. Yavuzarslan (E. Taşboğa) – 53:30	13–0
A. Solak (S. Gumus) – 54:47	14–0
E. Coskun (D. Ince) – 55:01	15–0
E. Ozmen (G. Tasdemir) – 58:57	16–0

16 min
Penalties
12 min
46
Shots
10

14 April 2011; 21:45	South Africa	5–2 (1–1, 1–0, 3–1)	Luxembourg	Grandwest Ice Arena; Attendance: 1,014

Game reference

David Berger
Goalies
Philippe Lepage
Referee:
(Ukraine) Maksym Urda
Linesmen:
(South Korea) Seung Won Jung
(Kazakhstan) Arkadiy Subbotin

J. Valadas (A. Marais, B. Matthews) (PP) – 02:14	1–0
	1–1	11:29 – R. Beran (F. Schons, T. Beran)
G. Lyon (C. Birrell) (PP) – 31:36	2–1
	2–2	41:22 – B. Welter (J. Holtzem) (PP)
A. Marais (D. Magmoed, B. Matthews) (PP2) – 46:56	3–2
B. Matthews (C. Reeve, C. Birrell) (PP) – 47:34	4–2
C. Birrell (A. Marais, G. Yates) – 57:40	5–2

32 min
Penalties
24 min
49
Shots
37

15 April 2011; 13:00	Mongolia	0–5 (forfeit)	South Africa	Grandwest Ice Arena

15 April 2011; 16:15	Luxembourg	5–6 (1–1, 1–2, 3–3)	Turkey	Grandwest Ice Arena; Attendance: 87

Game reference

Philippe Lepage
Gilles Mangen
Goalies
Levent Ozbaydugan
Referee:
(Russia) Mikhal Buturlin
Linesmen:
(South Africa) Nickolas Beukes
(Kazakhstan) Arkadiy Subbotin

	0–1	06:06 – E. Ozmen (S. Aktürk)
J. Holtzem (G. Scheier, B. Welter) – 18:23	1–1
	1–2	21:23 – S. Gumus (Y. Halil, G. Tasdemir)
S. Minden (R. Beran, T. Beran) – 31:09	2–2
	2–3	38:55 – S. Gumus (G. Tasdemir, Y. Halil) (PP)
	2–4	41:06 – E. Coskun (C. Baykan)
	2–5	42:49 – S. Aktürk (E. Ozmen, E. Coskun)
G. Scheier (PP) – 54:05	3–5
B. Schneider (S. Minden) (PP) – 54:12	4–5
	4–6	56:03 – S. Aktürk (E. Coskun, E. Ozmen) (PP)
B. Welter (R. Beran, S. Minden) (PP) – 59:47	5–6

35 min
Penalties
18 min
36
Shots
35

15 April 2011; 19:45	Greece	2–26 (0–6, 0–8, 2–12)	Israel	Grandwest Ice Arena; Attendance: 1,014

Game reference

Alexandros Moirasgetis
Pantelis Magklaras
Goalies
Boris Amromin
Avihu Sorotzki
Referee:
(Belgium) Chris Deweerdt
Linesmen:
(Bulgaria) Mikulash Furnadziev
(Netherlands) Jos Korte

	0–1	03:05 – E. Kniter (V. Schwarzman)
	0–2	06:25 – D. Mazour (E. Sherbatov)
	0–3	07:25 – M. Lebedev (S. Norman, I. Levy)
	0–4	09:30 – E. Sherbatov (D. Mazour, S. Frenkel)
	0–5	12:56 – S. Frenkel (D. Spivak)
	0–6	17:27 – M. Lebedev (A. Geller, I. Levy)
	0–7	24:53 – E. Sherbatov (A. Geller) (SH)
	0–8	25:17 – D. Mazour (SH)
	0–9	26:56 – A. Boulakhov (E. Kniter, D. Spivak)
	0–10	27:40 – E. Sherbatov (S. Frenkel)
	0–11	31:06 – D. Mazour (E. Sherbatov, R. Oz)
	0–12	33:02 – E. Kniter (S. Cooper)
	0–13	37:37 – S. Frenkel (E. Sherbatov)
	0–14	38:37 – S. Frenkel (E. Sherbatov)
	0–15	40:33 – E. Sherbatov
	0–16	44:01 – D. Mazour (S. Frenkel, D. Spivak) (PP)
	0–17	45:25 – I. Levy (S. Norman, M. Lebedev)
	0–18	46:31 – S. Frenkel (E. Sherbatov) (PP)
	0–19	48:25 – E. Sherbatov (S. Frenkel)
E. Fournogerakis (A. Dragatsis) – 50:37	1–19
	1–20	51:15 – T. Avneri
	1–21	51:51 – E. Kniter (A. Boulakhov)
	1–22	52:27 – D. Mazour (S. Frenkel, E. Sherbatov)
	1–23	53:01 – E. Sherbatov
	1–24	54:45 – S. Frenkel (E. Sherbatov)
	1–25	56:41 – V. Schwarzman (K. Malachi) (PP)
	1–26	56:50 – D. Mazour (E. Sherbatov)
K. Adamidis – 57:48	2–26

8 min
Penalties
2 min
8
Shots
65

17 April 2011; 13:00	Luxembourg	5–0 (forfeit)	Mongolia	Grandwest Ice Arena

17 April 2011; 16:15	Israel	9–1 (3–1, 5–0, 1–0)	Turkey	Grandwest Ice Arena; Attendance: 1,014

Game reference

Avihu Sorotzki
Goalies
Fikri Atali
Levent Ozbaydugan
Referee:
(Italy) Claudio Pianezze
Linesmen:
(Italy) Ulrich Pardatscher
(Denmark) Jacques Riisom-Birker

D. Mazour – 01:30	1–0
S. Frenkel (E. Sherbatov, A. Geller) (PP2) – 04:26	2–0
E. Sherbatov (S. Frenkel) – 12:28	3–0
	3–1	16:31 – A. Solak (E. Coskun, C. Akyıldız)
S. Frenkel (E. Sherbatov) (PP) – 23:18	4–1
I. Levy(D. Mazour, D. Spivak) (PP) – 24:31	5–1
R. Oz (D. Spivak) (PP) – 25:28	6–1
E. Sherbatov (S. Frenkel) (PP) – 33:23	7–1
S. Frenkel – 35:48	8–1
E. Kniter (D. Spivak) (PP) – 52:35	9–1

34 min
Penalties
63 min
40
Shots
21

17 April 2011; 21:45	South Africa	17–0 (4–0, 6–0, 7–0)	Greece	Grandwest Ice Arena; Attendance: 1,014

Game reference

Ashley Bock
Goalies
Pantelis Magklaras
Alexandros Moirasgetis
Referee:
(Ukraine) Maksym Urda
Linesmen:
(Bulgaria) Mikulash Furnadziev
(South Korea) Seung Won Jung

C. Engelbrecht (C. Birrell, U. Samaai) – 01:55	1–0
G. Lyon (G. Miller) – 06:42	2–0
G. Yates (C. Reeves, D. Magmoed) – 10:43	3–0
D. Cardoso (M. Giot, B. Matthews) – 15:30	4–0
A. Marais (A. Bock) – 22:55	5–0
G. Miller (I. Ashworth, C. Reeves) – 24:06	6–0
D. Magmoed (D. Cardoso, M. Giot) – 25:38	7–0
L. Carelse (D. Watson, C. Nebe) – 31:08	8–0
G. Lyon (G. Miller, J. Valadas) – 32:56	9–0
D. Magmoed (J. Valadas, G. Miller) (PP) – 36:17	10–0
U. Samaai (G. Lyon) (SH) – 43:39	11–0
D. Magmoed (U. Samaai, A. Marais) – 46:11	12–0
G. Miller (G. Lyon) – 47:16	13–0
D. Cardoso (G. Yates) – 49:40	14–0
D. Cardoso (M. Giot) (PP) – 50:27	15–0
U. Samaai (C. Reeves) – 51:48	16–0
D. Cardoso (D. Watson, M. Giot) – 58:09	17–0

43 min
Penalties
18 min
73
Shots
4

== Officials ==
The IIHF selected 4 referees and 7 linesmen to work the 2011 IIHF World Championship Div III. They were the following:

Referees

- (Ukraine) Maksym Urda
- (Italy) Claudio Pianezze
- (Belgium) Chris Deweerdt
- (Russia) Mikhal Buturlin

Linesmen

- (Netherlands) Jos Korte
- (Kazakhstan) Arkadiy Subbotin
- (Italy) Ulrich Pardatscher
- (Denmark) Jacques Riisom-Birker
- (South Africa) Nickolas Beukes
- (South Korea) Seung Won Jung
- (Bulgaria) Mikulash Furnadziev

== Statistics ==
=== Scoring leaders ===
List shows the top 10 skaters sorted by points, then goals.

Player	GP	G	A	Pts	+/−	PIM
(Israel) Eliezer Sherbatov	4	14	12	26	+22	0
(Israel) Sergei Frenkel	4	11	11	22	+21	4
(Israel) Daniel Mazour	4	11	7	18	+18	10
(Luxembourg) Robert Beran	4	4	8	12	+8	31
(Luxembourg) Thierry Beran	4	4	7	11	+4	0
(Israel) Daniel Spivak	4	4	6	10	+5	4
(South Africa) Cameron Birrell	4	0	10	10	+16	0
(South Africa) Deen Magmoed	4	6	3	9	+9	4
(Turkey) Savaş Aktürk	4	4	5	9	+5	10
(South Africa) Marc Giot	4	1	8	9	+8	6

GP = Games played; G = Goals; A = Assists; Pts = Points; +/− = Plus/minus; PIM = Penalties in minutes; POS = Position
Source: IIHF.com

=== Leading goaltenders ===
Only the top five goaltenders, based on save percentage, who have played 40% of their team's minutes are included in this list.

Player	TOI	SA	GA	GAA	Sv%	SO
(South Africa) David Berger	120:00	68	3	1.50	95.59	0
(Israel) Avihu Sorotzki	201:14	81	6	1.79	92.59	0
(South Africa) Ashley Bock	123:51	41	6	2.91	85.37	1
(Turkey) Levent Ozbaydugan	191:05	114	17	5.34	85.09	1
(Luxembourg) Philippe Lepage	221:57	124	21	5.68	83.06	1

TOI = Time on ice (minutes:seconds); SA = Shots against; GA = Goals against; GAA = Goals against average; Sv% = Save percentage; SO = Shutouts
Source: IIHF.com

=== Awards ===
Best players selected by the directorate

- Best Goaltender: (South Africa) David Berger
- Best Forward: (Israel) Eliezer Sherbatov
- Best Defenceman: (Israel) Daniel Spivak

Best players

Best player of each team selected by the coaches.

- (Greece) Kyriakos Adamidis
- (Israel) Tal Avneri
- (Luxembourg) Georges Scheier
- (South Africa) Ian Ashworth
- (Turkey) Emrah Ozmen
