= Israeli Canadians =

Community of Canadians of Israeli descent or with Israeli citizenship

ישראלים קנדים (Hebrew) Canadiens israéliens (French)

Total population
- 35,345 (by ancestry, 2021 Census)

Languages
- Canadian English · Canadian French · Hebrew · Arabic · Russian · Yiddish

Religion
- Mostly Jewish

Related ethnic groups
- Canadian Jews, Arab Canadians

Israeli Canadians (Hebrew: יִשְׂרְאֵלִים קָנָדִים) are Canadian citizens of Israeli descent or Israel-born people who reside in Canada. According to the 2011 Census there were 15,010 Canadians who claimed full or partial Israeli ancestry, although it is estimated that as many as 30,000 Israelis live in Canada, making it home to one of the largest Israeli diaspora groups in the world.

According to the 2016 Population Group Reference Guide published by Statistics Canada, those who trace their ancestry to present-day Israel or the greater Levant are classified as West Asian origin and visible minorities, provided they do not specify another European write-in response.

== Demographics ==
=== Israeli Canadians by province or territory ===
Province or territory	Israelis
Ontario	9,250
Quebec	3,100
British Columbia	1,190
Alberta	1,070
Manitoba	340
Nova Scotia	35
New Brunswick	25
Saskatchewan	1
Newfoundland and Labrador	2
Yukon	0
Prince Edward Island	0
Northwest Territories	0
Nunavut	0

=== Israeli Canadians by city ===
City	Province or territory	Israelis
Toronto	Ontario	7,625
Montreal	Quebec	2,975
Vancouver	British Columbia	985
Edmonton	Alberta	560
Calgary	Alberta	350
Winnipeg

== Prominent Canadians of Israeli descent ==
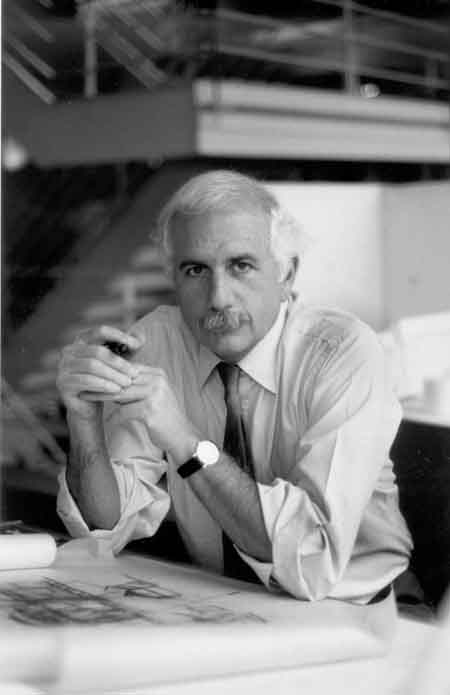
Moshe Safdie

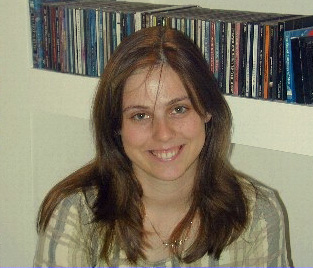
Sofia Polgar

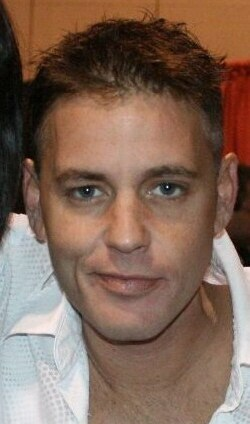
Corey Haim

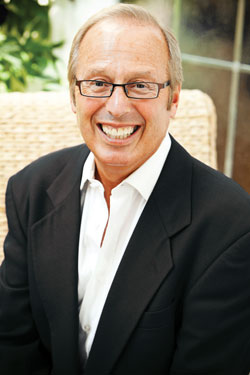
Sam Katz

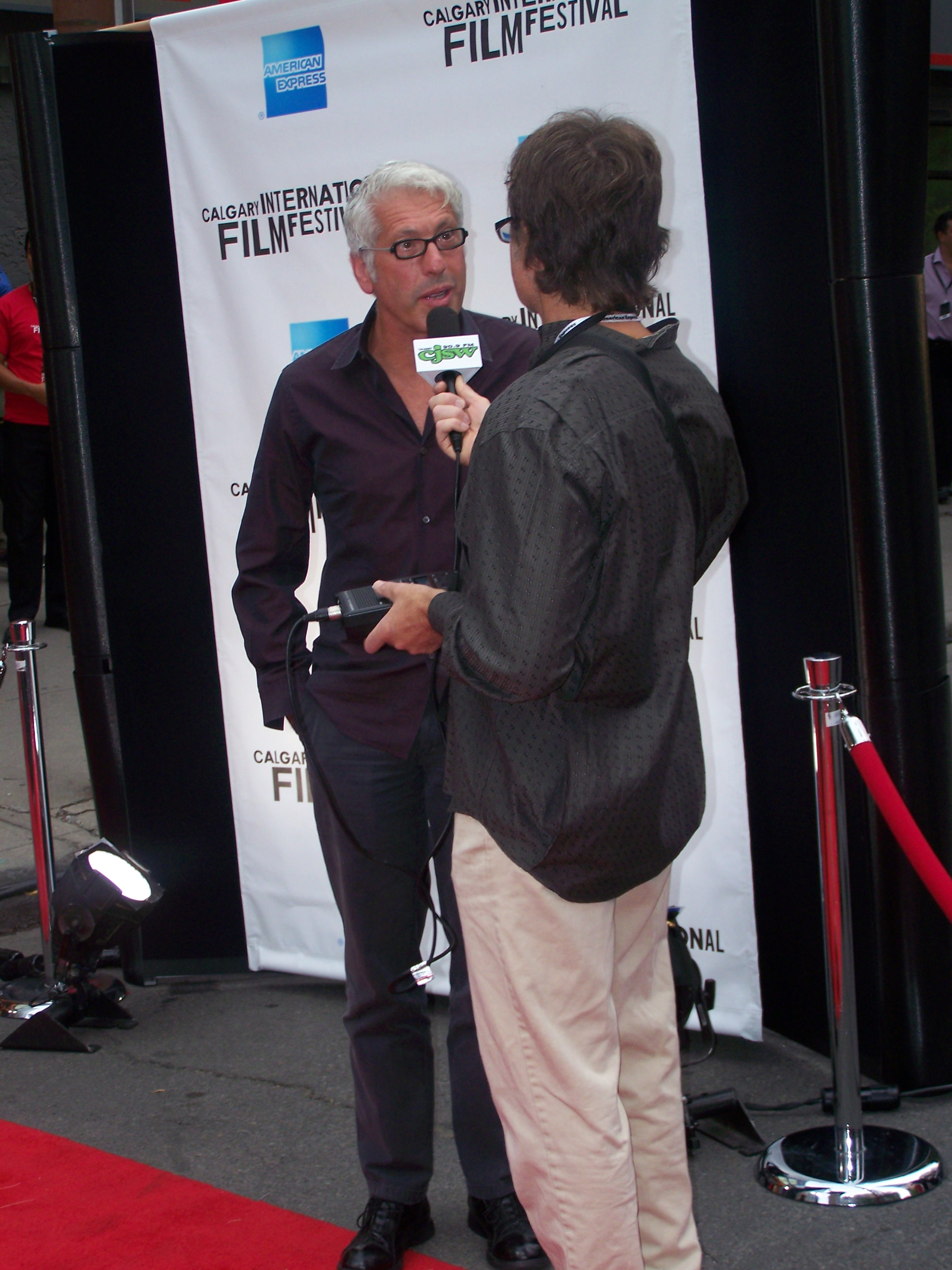
Niv Fichman

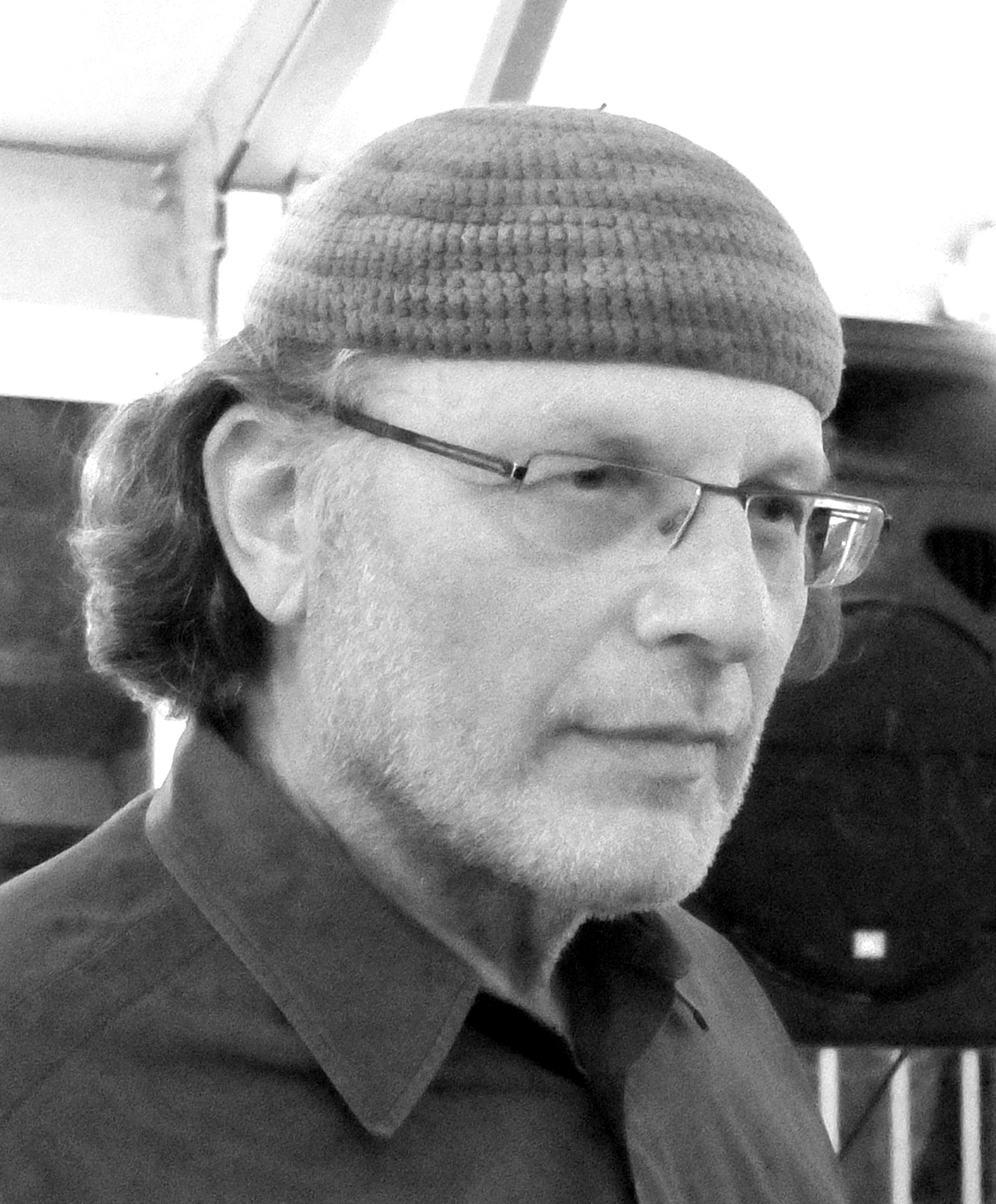
Simcha Jacobovici

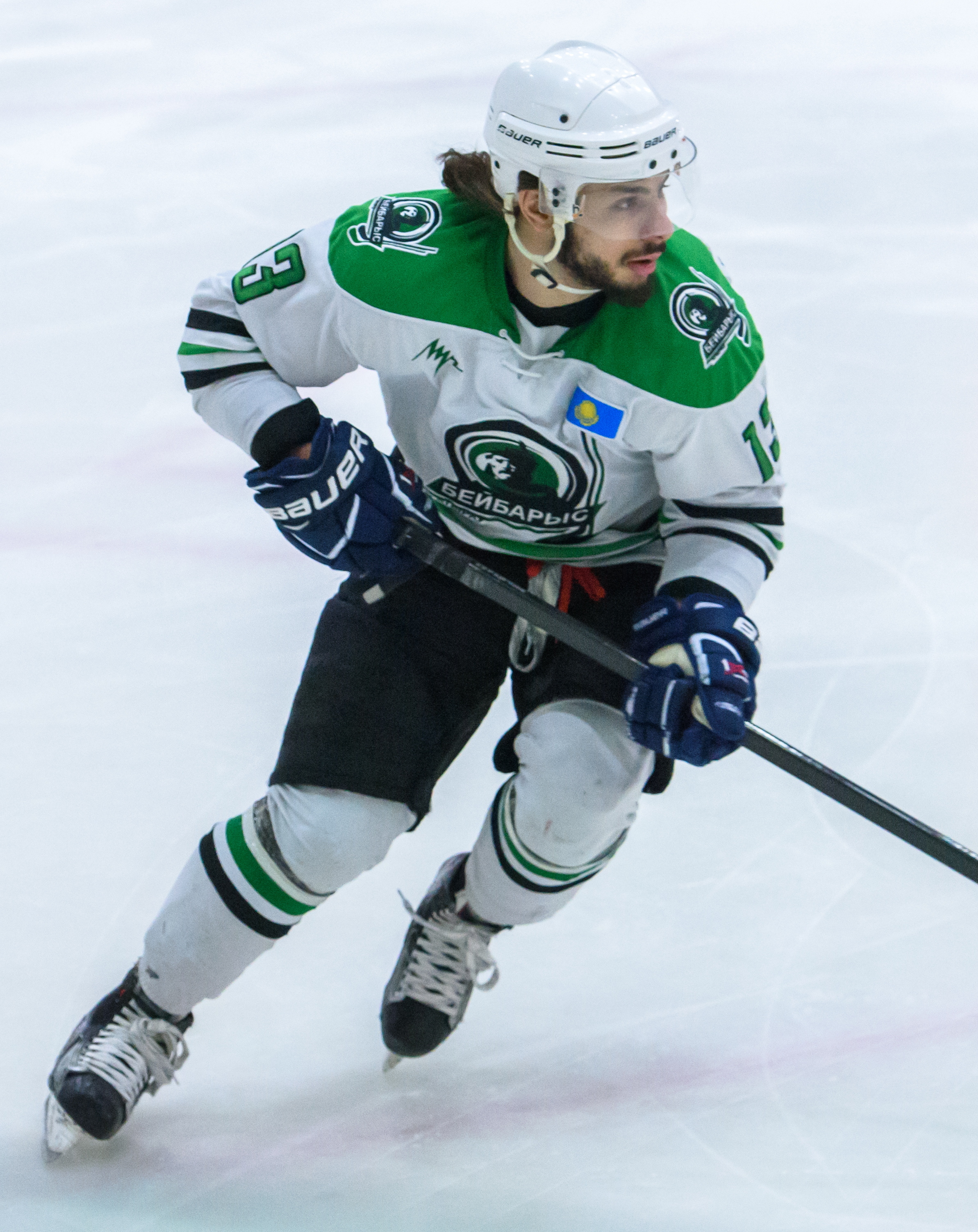
Eliezer Sherbatov

== See also ==
- Middle Eastern Canadians
- West Asian Canadians
- History of the Jews in Canada
- Canada–Israel relations
- Yerida
- Israeli Americans
