= Marko Šakić =

Croatian ice hockey player

- Born: April 13, 1994 (age 30); Zagreb, Croatia
- Height: 5 ft 11 in (180 cm)
- Weight: 174 lb (79 kg; 12 st 6 lb)
- Position: Centre
- Shoots: Left
- Germany-4 team Former teams: ESV Halle II; KHL Medveščak
- National team: Croatia
- NHL draft: Undrafted
- Playing career: 2013–present

Marko Šakić (born April 13, 1994) is a Croatian ice hockey forward. He played with KHL Medveščak of the Kontinental Hockey League (KHL) during the 2013–14 KHL season.
