= Wang Geng =

Chinese scientist (1927–2024)

- 汪耕
- Born: 11 October 1927; Nanjing, Jiangsu, China
- Died: 8 May 2024 (aged 96); Shanghai, China
- Education: Chiao Tung University (now Shanghai Jiao Tong University)
- Scientific career
- Fields: Motor design
- Workplaces: Shanghai Electric Motor Factory

Wang Geng (Chinese: 汪耕; pinyin: Wāng Gēng; 11 October 1927 – 8 May 2024) was a Chinese scientist, and an academician of the Chinese Academy of Sciences.

== Biography ==
Wang was born Wang Jiwei (汪积威) in Nanjing, Jiangsu, on 11 October 1927, while his ancestral home is in Xiuning County, Anhui. Due to avoiding the war, his family relocated to Jiangjin County, Sichuan (now Jiangjin, Chongqing), where he attended the National No. 9 Middle School (now Jiangjin No. 2 High School). In 1945, he enrolled at Chiao Tung University (now Shanghai Jiao Tong University), majoring in the Department of Electrical Engineering. He joined the Chinese Communist Party (CCP) in April 1949.

After university, in 1950, Wang was assigned to Shanghai Electric Motor Factory, where he successively served as design department head, deputy chief engineer, deputy factory director and deputy chief engineer. In 1960, Wang changed his name to Wang Geng. He retired in July 2003. After retirement, he served as a part-time professor at Shanghai Jiao Tong University.

On 8 May 2024, Wang died in Shanghai, at the age of 96.

== Contributions ==
In 1958, Wang participated in the design scheme and key component creation of the world's first 12000 kW double water-cooled steam turbine generator. In 1985, he won a State Science and Technology Progress Award (First Class) for participating in the creation of a dual water internal cooling steam turbine generator. He participated in the design and trial production of two sets of 80000 kVA AC pulse generator sets for the controlled nuclear fusion reaction research device's strong magnetic field power supply, for which he won a State Science and Technology Progress Award (Third Class) in 1987.

In 1983 and 1985, Wang served as the Chinese design leader twice and went to the United States to jointly develop a 300,000 kilowatt water hydrogen cooled steam turbine generator with Westinghouse Electric Corporation. In 1987, as one of the design leaders from the Chinese side, Wang went to Westinghouse Electric Corporation to optimize the design of a 600,000 kilowatt water hydrogen cooled steam turbine generator.

== Honours and awards ==
- 1985 State Science and Technology Progress Award (First Class)
- 1987 State Science and Technology Progress Award (Third Class)
- 1991 Member of the Chinese Academy of Sciences (CAS)
