= Tomislav Zanoški =

Croatian professional ice hockey forward (born 1984)

- Born: March 3, 1984 (age 42) Zagreb, SR Croatia, SFR Yugoslavia
- Height: 5 ft 11 in (180 cm)
- Weight: 185 lb (84 kg; 13 st 3 lb)
- Position: Right wing
- Shoots: Left
- Erste Liga team Former teams: Dunaújvárosi Acélbikák; Binghamton Senators; Albany River Rats; Lake Erie Monsters; Toronto Marlies; Syracuse Crunch; Medveščak Zagreb; EC KAC; EHC Black Wings Linz; Troja-Ljungby; HC Bolzano; HDD Olimpija Ljubljana; Sheffield Steelers
- National team: Croatia
- NHL draft: Undrafted
- Playing career: 2007–present

Tomislav "Tom" Zanoški (born March 3, 1984) is a Croatian-Canadian professional ice hockey forward. He is currently playing for KHL Medveščak.

== Playing career ==
Zanoški was born in Zagreb, Croatia, but immigrated to Canada and was raised in Brampton, Ontario. He originally started his junior career in the Ontario Junior A Hockey League with the Vaughan Vipers in 2001.

Zanoški played for the Owen Sound Attack of the Ontario Hockey League from 2001 to 2003 and in the 2002 to 2003 season they made the playoffs. He was sent to the Mississauga IceDogs during the 2003–04 season and played with them until 2005. This team also made the playoffs in 2003-04 and 2004-05 seasons.

Zanoški enrolled at Dalhousie University in 2005 and attended classes there until midway through the 2007–08 season when he turned professional, joining the Stockton Thunder of the ECHL, where he played in 42 regular season games and 4 playoff games.

He began the 2008–09 season with the Thunder, playing in 3 games, but was then loaned to the Dayton Bombers for another 3 games. He was then traded to the Gwinnett Gladiators, where he remained for the rest of the ECHL season, including the playoffs. Zanoški was then re-signed to a one-year contract with the Gladiators on June 19, 2009.

In the 2009–10 season, Zanoški improved his offensive output with Gwinnett, with 47 points in 42 games, and was selected on one occasion as runner-up in the ECHL's player of the week. . Throughout the season, Zanoški appeared on loan for 5 different American Hockey League teams. On December 15, 2009, he was signed to a professional tryout with the Binghamton Senators, but was released 5 days later. After a short stint with the Albany River Rats from January 15, he was later signed to a P.T.O with the Lake Erie Monsters on January 21, and scored two goals in 9 games, his first in the AHL. Zanoški then finished out the season with two game spells with the Toronto Marlies and the Syracuse Crunch.

On July 2, 2010, Zanoški's ECHL rights were retained by the Gladiators for the 2010–11 season. However, after making an impact in his brief time with Lake Erie of the AHL the previous season, he was signed by the Monsters to a season-long contract. After posting 6 points in 21 games with the Monsters, Zanoški was reassigned to the Gladiators on loan. On January 26, 2011, he was released from his Monsters contract and returned to Gwinnett temporarily before leaving for Europe to sign with Wölfe Freiburg of the German 2nd Bundesliga on January 31, for the remainder of the season.

A free agent at season's end and harboring intentions to play for Croatia, Zanoški signed a contract with KHL Medveščak, marking a return to his native Zagreb on June 2, 2011.

During the 2012–13 season, his second with Zagreb, Zanoski was released. He joined EBEL club EC KAC of Austria on December 13, 2012.

On September 11, 2014, Zanoški returned to the EBEL on a one-month try-out contract, signing as injury cover with Italian club, HC Bolzano. Seven games into the 2014–15 season, Zanoski's try-out was terminated and he was not offered a contract. On October 8, 2014, he signed for the remainder of the EBEL season with Slovenian club, HDD Olimpija Ljubljana.

Zanoški returned to Croatia as a free agent for a second stint with KHL Medveščak Zagreb, now of the Kontinental Hockey League, on July 9, 2015.

== Career statistics ==
=== Regular season and playoffs ===
			Regular season					Playoffs
Season	Team	League	GP	G	A	Pts	PIM	GP	G	A	Pts	PIM
2000–01	Vaughan Vipers	OJAHL	6	0	0	0	6	—	—	—	—	—
2001–02	Owen Sound Attack	OHL	55	2	4	6	73	—	—	—	—	—
2002–03	Owen Sound Attack	OHL	59	10	14	24	91	4	1	0	1	12
2003–04	Owen Sound Attack	OHL	17	3	7	10	32	—	—	—	—	—
2003–04	Mississauga IceDogs	OHL	46	10	26	36	54	23	7	6	13	20
2004–05	Mississauga IceDogs	OHL	65	20	30	50	95	5	1	3	4	15
2005–06	Dalhousie University	CIS	28	7	14	21	56	—	—	—	—	—
2006–07	Dalhousie University	CIS	24	12	17	29	39	—	—	—	—	—
2007–08	Dalhousie University	CIS	14	3	7	10	33	—	—	—	—	—
2007–08	Stockton Thunder	ECHL	42	12	8	20	98	4	0	1	1	2
2008–09	Stockton Thunder	ECHL	3	0	1	1	6	—	—	—	—	—
2008–09	Dayton Bombers	ECHL	3	1	0	1	2	—	—	—	—	—
2008–09	Gwinnett Gladiators	ECHL	31	8	13	21	47	5	3	5	8	8
2009–10	Gwinnett Gladiators	ECHL	42	25	22	47	60	—	—	—	—	—
2009–10	Binghamton Senators	AHL	8	0	1	1	6	—	—	—	—	—
2009–10	Albany River Rats	AHL	2	0	0	0	2	—	—	—	—	—
2009–10	Lake Erie Monsters	AHL	9	2	3	5	7	—	—	—	—	—
2009–10	Toronto Marlies	AHL	2	0	0	0	0	—	—	—	—	—
2009–10	Syracuse Crunch	AHL	2	0	0	0	0	—	—	—	—	—
2010–11	Lake Erie Monsters	AHL	21	2	4	6	20	—	—	—	—	—
2010–11	Gwinnett Gladiators	ECHL	13	5	7	12	18	—	—	—	—	—
2010–11	Wölfe Freiburg	2.GBun	6	4	3	7	2	—	—	—	—	—
2011–12	KHL Medveščak Zagreb	EBEL	48	15	17	32	117	9	4	3	7	45
2012–13	KHL Medveščak Zagreb	EBEL	29	10	3	13	23	—	—	—	—	—
2012–13	EC KAC	EBEL	21	5	5	10	22	12	0	0	0	30
2013–14	Evansville IceMen	ECHL	19	9	10	19	23	—	—	—	—	—
2013–14	EHC Black Wings Linz	EBEL	6	0	0	0	0	—	—	—	—	—
2013–14	Troja-Ljungby	Allsv	10	4	2	6	8	—	—	—	—	—
2014–15	HC Bolzano	EBEL	7	2	0	2	4	—	—	—	—	—
2014–15	HDD Olimpija Ljubljana	EBEL	37	11	13	24	23	—	—	—	—	—
2015–16	KHL Medveščak Zagreb	KHL	15	3	0	3	16	—	—	—	—	—
2016–17	KHL Medveščak Zagreb	KHL	24	2	1	3	14	—	—	—	—	—
2017–18	KHL Medveščak Zagreb	EBEL	49	3	1	4	47	2	0	0	0	2
AHL totals			44	4	8	12	35	—	—	—	—	—

=== International ===
Year	Team	Event	Result	GP	G	A	Pts	PIM
2017	Croatia	WC-D1	27th	4	0	0	0	0
2018	Croatia	WC-D1	28th	5	1	1	2	12
Senior totals				9	1	1	2	12
