= Ice hockey at the 2018 Winter Olympics – Men's qualification =

Qualification for the men's tournament at the 2018 Winter Olympics was determined by the IIHF World Ranking following the 2015 Men's World Ice Hockey Championships. The host along with the top eight teams in the world ranking received automatic berths into the Olympics, while all other teams had an opportunity to qualify for the remaining three spots in the Olympics. This was the fourth time world rankings were used but the first time that the championships three years prior was used as the final determination.

== Qualified teams ==
Event	Date	Location	Vacancies	Qualified
Hosts	19 September 2014	(Spain) Tenerife	1	South Korea
2015 IIHF World Ranking	2 April 2012 – 17 May 2015	(Czech Republic) Prague and Ostrava	8	Canada; Russia; Sweden; Finland; United States; Czech Republic; Switzerland; Slovakia
Final qualification tournament	1–4 September 2016	(Belarus) Minsk	1	Slovenia
Final qualification tournament	1–4 September 2016	(Latvia) Riga	1	Germany
Final qualification tournament	1–4 September 2016	(Norway) Oslo	1	Norway
Total			12	

Notes

1. ^{a} 2015 IIHF World Ranking were comprising the following events: 2012 World Championship, 2013 World Championship, 2014 Winter Olympic Games, 2014 World Championship and 2015 World Championship
2. ^{b} Prague and Ostrava were the sites for 2015 IIHF World Championship; at the conclusion of the tournament the ranking were finalized with regards to the qualification slots.
3. ^{c} In December 2017, the IOC suspended the Russian Olympic Committee from competing at the Winter Olympics as part of its sanctions following state-sponsored doping allegations. Russian athletes deemed clean were permitted to compete as Olympic Athletes from Russia.

== Qualification seeding ==
To qualify directly, a nation had to be ranked in the top eight following the 2015 Men's World Ice Hockey Championships. Using the IIHF World Ranking points system, the current year received full value, and each preceding year was worth 25% less. Teams that wished to compete had to apply in April 2015. The following is a ranking based on points already accumulated toward Olympic qualification of all countries participating in 2015.

Points were earned based on overall finish in 2015:

Place	1	2	3	4	5	6	7	8	9	10	11	12	13	14	15	16	17	18	19	20	...
Points	1200	1160	1120	1100	1060	1040	1020	1000	960	940	920	900	880	860	840	820	800	780	760	740	...

Qualified directly to Olympic Tournament
Entered qualifying in the final round
Entered qualifying in the preliminary round 2
Entered qualifying in the preliminary round 1

Qualifying seed	Team	WC 2015	WC 2014	OLY 2014	WC 2013	WC 2012	Total
1	Canada	1200	795	900	530	265	3690
2	Russia	1160	900	795	520	300	3675
3	Sweden	1060	840	870	600	260	3630
4	Finland	1040	870	840	550	275	3575
5	United States	1120	780	825	560	255	3540
6	Czech Republic	1100	825	780	510	280	3495
7	Switzerland	1000	705	720	580	230	3235
8	Slovakia	960	720	690	500	290	3160
9	Belarus	1020	765	645	430	215	3075
10	Latvia	880	690	750	460	235	3015
11	Norway	920	675	675	470	250	2990
12	France	900	750	600	440	240	2930
13	Germany	940	645	630	480	225	2920
14	Slovenia	820	600	765	410	200	2795
15	Denmark	860	660	585	450	220	2775
16	Austria	840	585	705	420	195	2745
17	Kazakhstan	800	615	660	400	205	2680
18	Italy	720	630	615	390	210	2565
19	Hungary	780	540	525	380	190	2415
20	Japan	740	570	480	370	185	2345
21	Ukraine	700	555	540	340	175	2310
22	Poland	760	510	510	330	165	2275
Hosts	South Korea	680	525	495	360	170	2230
23	Great Britain	660	465	570	350	180	2225
24	Netherlands	580	450	555	320	160	2065
25	Lithuania	640	480	465	300	150	2035
26	Croatia	620	495	405	280	130	1930
27	Romania	560	435	435	310	155	1895
28	Estonia	600	420	420	290	140	1870
29	Serbia	520	390	375	240	120	1645
30	Spain	500	330	450	230	135	1645
31	Mexico	400	315	390	200	95	1400
32	Israel	360	345	360	220	90	1375
	Belgium	540	360	0	270	110	1280
33	Iceland	480	405	0	260	125	1270
	Australia	460	375	0	250	145	1230
	New Zealand	420	300	0	210	115	1045
34	China	440	285	0	190	105	1020
35	Bulgaria	380	240	0	170	100	890
	South Africa	340	270	0	160	85	855
	Turkey	300	255	0	180	80	815
	North Korea	320	225	0	150	75	770
	Luxembourg	280	210	0	140	70	700
	United Arab Emirates	220	180	0	110	0	510
36	Georgia	240	165	0	90	0	495
	Hong Kong	260	195	0	0	0	455
	Bosnia and Herzegovina	200	0	0	0	0	200

- Three nations were not listed who have achieved ranking points but were not participating in IIHF tournaments: Ireland, Greece, and Mongolia.
- Nations with no seeding chose not to participate in Olympic qualifying.

== Preliminary round 1 ==
The two lowest ranked participants played off for the right to compete in this round on 10 October 2015, in Sofia, Bulgaria. The round itself was played from 5 to 8 November 2015. The winner of each group advanced to the pre-qualification tournaments as qualifiers seven and eight ranked according their seeding.

=== Playoff game ===
10 October 2015; 19:30	Bulgaria	9–1 (2–1, 3–0, 4–0)	Georgia	Winter Sports Palace, Sofia; Attendance: 581

Game reference

Dimitar Dimitrov
Konstantin Mihailov
Goalies
Andrei Ilienko
Referee:
(Slovakia) Tomáš Orolin
Linesmen:
(Bulgaria) Kiril Peychinov
(Slovakia) Matúš Stanzel

Boyadjiev (Bozhanov) (SH) – 03:37	1–0
	1–1	07:19 – Dumbadze (Oganeziani)
Boyadjiev (Gatchev, Bozhanov) – 12:24	2–1
Gatchev (Boyadjiev, Mihov) – 20:55	3–1
Semkov (Tchaliov, Mihov) – 21:28	4–1
Mihov (Boyadjiev) – 33:08	5–1
Mihov (Boyadjiev, Gatchev) – 40:36	6–1
Stefanov (Boyadjiev, Gatchev) (SH) – 45:58	7–1
Gatchev (Boyadjiev, Mihov) – 49:05	8–1
Gatchev (Blagoev, Boyadjiev) (PP) – 55:56	9–1

14 min
Penalties
12 min
51
Shots
11

=== Group K ===
Games were played at Tallinn, Estonia.

Pos	Team	Pld	W	OTW	OTL	L	GF	GA	GD	Pts	Qualification
1	Estonia (H)	3	3	0	0	0	58	4	+54	9	Pre-qualification
2	Mexico	3	2	0	0	1	16	15	+1	6	
3	Israel	3	1	0	0	2	6	26	−20	3	
4	Bulgaria	3	0	0	0	3	4	39	−35	0	

Source: IIHF
Rules for classification: 1) points; 2) head-to-head points; 3) head-to-head goal difference; 4) head-to-head number of goals scored; 5) result against closest best-ranked team outside tied teams; 6) result against second-best ranked team outside tied teams; 7) seeding before tournament.
(H) Host

All times are local (UTC+2).

5 November 2015; 15:00	Mexico	8–2 (1–0, 3–2, 4–0)	Bulgaria	Tallinn Arena, Tallinn; Attendance: 238

Game reference

Alfonso de Alba
Goalies
Dimitar Dimitrov
Nikola Nikolov
Referee:
(United Kingdom) Dean Smith
Linesmen:
(Denmark) Jacques Riisom-Birker
(Estonia) Toivo Tilku

J. Pérez (Tommasi) – 11:20	1–0
	1–1	20:14 – Iskrenov (Boyadjiev, Stefanov)
Tommasi (Ortega) (SH) – 30:27	2–1
	2–2	34:04 – Semkov (SH)
J. Pérez (Gómez) – 39:26	3–2
Gómez – 39:50	4–2
Gómez (González, Chabat) (PP) – 46:02	5–2
Gómez (Arroyo, Chabat) (PP) – 51:38	6–2
J. Pérez (González) – 54:48	7–2
Díaz – 59:45	8–2

22 min
Penalties
8 min
37
Shots
23

5 November 2015; 19:00	Israel	1–19 (0–6, 0–5, 1–8)	Estonia	Tallinn Arena, Tallinn; Attendance: 850

Game reference

Alexander Loginov
Maxim Gokhberg
Goalies
Roman Šumihhin
Referee:
(Finland) Lassi Heikkinen
Linesmen:
(Slovenia) Anže Bergant
(Iceland) Óli Þór Gunnarsson

	0–1	01:52 – Kuznetsov (Lahesalu, Rooba)
	0–2	04:06 – Gornostajev (Titarenko)
	0–3	11:48 – Fedoruk (Võrang, Lahesalu)
	0–4	13:35 – Lahesalu (Titarenko, Rooba) (PP)
	0–5	16:55 – Võrang (Sorokin, Sildre)
	0–6	17:52 – Rooba (Gornostajev, Titarenko)
	0–7	28:29 – Rooba (Kozõrev)
	0–8	29:04 – Lahesalu (Rooba, Gornostajev)
	0–9	30:42 – Russ
	0–10	34:51 – Lukats (Russ, Lahesalu)
	0–11	38:13 – Rooba (Titarenko, Lahesalu) (PP)
	0–12	41:25 – Fedoruk (Võrang, Kuznetsov)
	0–13	42:28 – Sorokin (Minin, Russ)
Revniaga (Natalchenko) – 43:05	1–13
	1–14	45:10 – Lukats (Sorokin, Sildre) (PP)
	1–15	45:26 – Sorokin (Russ, Lukats)
	1–16	51:15 – Kuznetsov (Rooba)
	1–17	54:52 – Gornostajev (Titarenko, Sildre)
	1–18	56:19 – Lukats (Russ, Rõbuškin) (SH)
	1–19	57:37 – Gornostajev (Rooba, Kerna)

10 min
Penalties
8 min
9
Shots
87

6 November 2015; 15:00	Mexico	5–0 (2–0, 1–0, 2–0)	Israel	Tallinn Arena, Tallinn; Attendance: 237

Game reference

Alfonso de Alba
Goalies
Maxim Gokhberg
Referee:
(Norway) Stian Halm
Linesmen:
(Slovenia) Anže Bergant
(Estonia) Toivo Tilku

Chabat (González, Arroyo) (PP) – 08:43	1–0
Chabat (Arroyo, Ugarte) (PP) – 16:58	2–0
Smithers (Gómez) – 24:36	3–0
Chabat (Gómez, Arroyo) (PP) – 50:25	4–0
Ugarte – 56:25	5–0

12 min
Penalties
16 min
53
Shots
31

6 November 2015; 19:00	Estonia	26–0 (10–0, 8–0, 8–0)	Bulgaria	Tallinn Arena, Tallinn; Attendance: 647

Game reference

Villem-Henrik Koitmaa
Goalies
Dimitar Dimitrov
Nikola Nikolov
Referee:
(United Kingdom) Dean Smith
Linesmen:
(Latvia) Māris Locāns
(Denmark) Jacques Riisom-Birker

Kuznetsov (Fedoruk, Võrang) – 01:16	1–0
Rooba – 03:14	2–0
Titarenko (Rooba, Gornostajev) – 06:15	3–0
Sinikas (Titarenko, Rooba) – 06:39	4–0
Arrak (Kerna) – 08:57	5–0
Auksi (Võrang, Kuznetsov) – 10:43	6–0
Rooba (Titarenko, Gornostajev) – 13:19	7–0
Arrak (Kozõrev) – 16:11	8–0
Titarenko (Sildre, Rooba) – 17:00	9–0
Arrak (Teppan) – 19:18	10–0
Kozõrev (Rõbuškin, Lahesalu) – 24:07	11–0
Rooba (Gornostajev) – 24:51	12–0
Arrak (Teppan) – 27:22	13–0
Titarenko (Rooba, Sinikas) – 27:35	14–0
Gornostajev (Kerna, Minin) – 31:51	15–0
Rooba (Rõbuškin, Titarenko) – 34:33	16–0
Teppan (Kerna, Kozõrev) (PP) – 36:54	17–0
Sorokin (Minin, Kerna) – 37:04	18–0
Rooba (Titarenko) – 40:40	19–0
Titarenko (Gornostajev, Rooba) – 43:38	20–0
Titarenko (Rooba, Minin) – 47:14	21–0
Võrang (Kuznetsov) (PP) – 53:13	22–0
Russ (Kerna, Sorokin) – 53:48	23–0
Russ (Sorokin, Sinikas) – 54:09	24–0
Arrak (Kozõrev, Lahesalu) – 54:43	25–0
Kuznetsov (Fedoruk, Võrang) – 59:43	26–0

2 min
Penalties
6 min
102
Shots
9

8 November 2015; 13:00	Bulgaria	2–5 (1–0, 0–1, 1–4)	Israel	Tallinn Arena, Tallinn; Attendance: 205

Game reference

Dimitar Dimitrov
Goalies
Maxim Gokhberg
Referee:
(Norway) Stian Halm
Linesmen:
(Latvia) Māris Locāns
(Estonia) Toivo Tilku

Boyadjiev (SH) – 17:42	1–0
	1–1	24:47 – Spektor
Hristov – 45:09	2–1
	2–2	50:24 – Spektor (Kafri, Revniaga)
	2–3	55:07 – Aharonovich (Raiter) (SH)
	2–4	58:43 – Spektor (Aharonovich) (ENG)
	2–5	59:10 – Kafri (Sherf)

30 min
Penalties
20 min
30
Shots
24

8 November 2015; 17:00	Estonia	13–3 (3–1, 3–2, 7–0)	Mexico	Tallinn Arena, Tallinn; Attendance: 1,150

Game reference

Roman Šumihhin
Goalies
Alfonso de Alba
Referee:
(Finland) Lassi Heikkinen
Linesmen:
(Slovenia) Anže Bergant
(Iceland) Óli Þór Gunnarsson

	0–1	10:29 – Martínez (Gómez) (SH)
Fedoruk (Kuznetsov, Minin) – 12:22	1–1
Lukats (Lahesalu) – 13:05	2–1
Võrang (Kuznetsov, Lahesalu) – 14:57	3–1
Rooba (Lahesalu) (PP) – 22:24	4–1
Rooba (Gornostajev) – 28:09	5–1
	5–2	30:39 – Arroyo (Gómez, Martínez)
Rooba (Gornostajev, Titarenko) – 32:04	6–2
	6–3	39:45 – Chabat (Ugarte, González)
Sorokin (Minin, Lukats) (EA) – 43:09	7–3
Arrak (Kozorev, Robushkin) – 48:15	8–3
Gornostajev (Rooba, Sildre) – 48:31	9–3
Minin (Titarenko, Gornostajev) – 49:23	10–3
Sorokin (Lukats) (EA) – 51:08	11–3
Teppan (Kozorev, Minin) – 51:35	12–3
Minin (Rooba) – 56:04	13–3

8 min
Penalties
8 min
58
Shots
10

=== Group L ===
Games were played in Valdemoro, Spain.

Pos	Team	Pld	W	OTW	OTL	L	GF	GA	GD	Pts	Qualification
1	Serbia	3	2	1	0	0	15	8	+7	8	Pre-qualification
2	Spain (H)	3	2	0	0	1	18	9	+9	6	
3	Iceland	3	1	0	1	1	18	13	+5	4	
4	China	3	0	0	0	3	5	26	−21	0	

Source: IIHF
Rules for classification: 1) points; 2) head-to-head points; 3) head-to-head goal difference; 4) head-to-head number of goals scored; 5) result against closest best-ranked team outside tied teams; 6) result against second-best ranked team outside tied teams; 7) seeding before tournament.
(H) Host

All times are local (UTC+1).

6 November 2015; 16:00	Iceland	4–5 GWS (2–2, 0–1, 2–1) (OT 0–0) (SO: 0–1)	Serbia	Francisco Fernández Ochoa Arena, Valdemoro; Attendance: 125

Game reference

Snorri Sigurbergsson
Goalies
Arsenije Ranković
Referee:
(France) Damien Bliek
Linesmen:
(Czech Republic) Tomáš Brejcha
(France) Gwilherm Margry

	0–1	01:30 – Milovanović (Janković, Glavonjić)
Bjarnason (PP) – 07:37	1–1
	1–2	16:01 – Vučurević (Glavonjić)
Andrésson (Leifsson, B. Árnason) – 16:18	2–2
	2–3	37:25 – Filipović (Vučurević)
Leifsson (PS) – 46:21	3–3
	3–4	47:24 – Milovanović (Brkušanin, Filipović) (PP)
Björnsson (Alengaard) (SH) – 50:37	4–4

Sigurðarson (miss)
Alengaard (miss)
Leifsson (miss)
Shootout
Janković
(miss) Popravka
(miss) Vučurević
14 min
Penalties
12 min
52
Shots
30

6 November 2015; 19:30	Spain	10–1 (2–0, 6–1, 2–0)	China	Francisco Fernández Ochoa Arena, Valdemoro; Attendance: 750

Game reference

Ander Alcaine
Goalies
Liu Zhiwei
Referee:
(Slovenia) Luka Kamšek
Linesmen:
(Germany) Andreas Kowert
(Austria) Martin Smeibidlo

Solózano (Carbonell, P. González) – 05:27	1–0
Ubieto (A. García, Carbonell) – 06:26	2–0
Anglés (A. Betran, García-Arias) – 22:59	3–0
Puyuelo (G. Betran) – 23:31	4–0
Carbonell (Fuentes, G. González)(PP) – 28:07	5–0
	5–1	29:01 – Xia (Qu)
P. Muñoz(PP) – 31:33	6–1
A. Vea (García-Arias) – 35:57	7–1
Solórzano (P. González) – 36:50	8–1
J. Muñoz (Palacin, Pedraz)(PP) – 47:13	9–1
Fuentes (Palacin, G. González)(PP) – 55:03	10–1

8 min
Penalties
18 min
56
Shots
11

7 November 2015; 16:00	Serbia	5–1 (4–0, 1–1, 0–0)	China	Francisco Fernández Ochoa Arena, Valdemoro; Attendance: 120

Game reference

Arsenije Ranković
Petar Stepanović
Goalies
Liu Zhiwei
Referee:
(Slovenia) Luka Kamšek
Linesmen:
(Czech Republic) Tomáš Brejcha
(Austria) Martin Smeibidlo

Milovanović (Janković) – 04:21	1–0
Luković (Glavonjić, Janković) – 11:25	2–0
Popravka (Filipović, Vučurević) – 13:58	3–0
Raković (P. Novaković, Ristić) – 19:57	4–0
	4–1	24:06 – Yang (Liu Q.)
Popravka (Filipović, Vučurević) – 24:18	5–1

0 min
Penalties
16 min
48
Shots
18

7 November 2015; 19:30	Spain	5–3 (2–1, 2–1, 1–1)	Iceland	Francisco Fernández Ochoa Arena, Valdemoro; Attendance: 850

Game reference

Ander Alcaine
Goalies
Snorri Sigurbergsson
Referee:
(Italy) Andrea Moschen
Linesmen:
(Germany) Andreas Kowert
(Italy) Federico Stefenelli

	0–1	03:34 – Mikaelsson (Bergmann, B. Árnason)
P. Muñoz (G. González, Fuentes) – 10:27	1–1
A. García (Pedraz) – 14:35	2–1
	2–2	21:47 – Guðnason (Pálsson)
Pedraz (A. García, Fuentes) – 24:41	3–2
P. González (Solózano, Fuentes) – 36:09	4–2
	4–3	48:02 – Leifsson (I. Árnason, Ingason)
G. González (Solórzano) (PP) – 54:15	5–3

10 min
Penalties
6 min
39
Shots
29

8 November 2015; 16:00	China	3–11 (0–7, 1–2, 2–2)	Iceland	Francisco Fernández Ochoa Arena, Valdemoro; Attendance: 150

Game reference

Liu Zhiwei
Xia Shengrong
Goalies
Omar Skulason
Referee:
(Italy) Andrea Moschen
Linesmen:
(France) Gwilherm Margry
(Italy) Federico Stefenelli

	0–1	01:44 – Hedström (Leifsson, Bjarnason)
	0–2	07:40 – I. Árnason (Mikaelsson)
	0–3	08:48 – Pálsson (I. Árnason, Mikaelsson)
	0–4	13:56 – I. Árnason (Gíslason, Leifsson) (PP2)
	0–5	14:37 – Hedström (Alengaard, Leifsson) (PP2)
	0–6	15:32 – Pálsson (Mikaelsson, Leifsson) (PP)
	0–7	15:54 – Helgason (þormóðsson, Andrésson)
	0–8	33:08 – Maack (Mikaelsson)
	0–9	34:02 – Hedström (Björnsson)
Bao (Guan, Yang) – 35:31	1–9
	1–10	42:24 – Hedström (Alengaard)
Liu L. (Hu, Xia T.) (PP) – 51:57	2–10
	2–11	52:39 – Hedström (Björnsson, I. Árnason)
Hu (Liu L.) (SH) – 59:36	3–11

16 min
Penalties
10 min
22
Shots
46

8 November 2015; 20:00	Serbia	5–3 (0–2, 2–0, 3–1)	Spain	Francisco Fernández Ochoa Arena, Valdemoro; Attendance: 950

Game reference

Arsenije Ranković
Goalies
Ander Alcaine
Referee:
(France) Damien Bliek
Linesmen:
(Germany) Andreas Kowert
(Austria) Martin Smeibidlo

	0–1	11:51 – G. Betran (Alcaine) (PP)
	0–2	17:48 – Fuentes (Solózano, G. González)
Filipović (U. Novaković, Vučurević) – 27:29	1–2
Filipović (Vučurević, U. Novaković) – 36:31	2–2
Popravka (Filipović) – 44:56	3–2
	3–3	50:27 – Pedraz (Ubieto, Fuentes)
Milovanović (Brkušanin) – 57:26	4–3
Brkušanin (SH, ENG) – 59:41	5–3

18 min
Penalties
8 min
29
Shots
39

== Preliminary round 2 ==
Three round robins were played from 11 to 14 February 2016. The teams seeded 18th, 19th, and 20th reserved the right to host these tournaments. The winners of each advanced to the final qualification tournaments as qualifiers four, five, and six, ranked according to their seeding.

=== Group G ===
Games were played at Cortina, Italy.

Pos	Team	Pld	W	OTW	OTL	L	GF	GA	GD	Pts	Qualification
1	Italy (H)	3	3	0	0	0	18	4	+14	9	Final qualification
2	Great Britain	3	2	0	0	1	14	13	+1	6	
3	Netherlands	3	1	0	0	2	14	13	+1	3	
4	Serbia	3	0	0	0	3	5	21	−16	0	

Source: IIHF
Rules for classification: 1) points; 2) head-to-head points; 3) head-to-head goal difference; 4) head-to-head number of goals scored; 5) result against closest best-ranked team outside tied teams; 6) result against second-best ranked team outside tied teams; 7) seeding before tournament.
(H) Host

All times are local (UTC+1).

11 February 2016; 17:00	Great Britain	6–5 (2–1, 2–2, 2–2)	Netherlands	Stadio Olympica, Cortina d'Ampezzo; Attendance: 302

Game reference

Ben Bowns
Goalies
Martijn Oosterwijk
Referees:
(Germany) Marcus Brill
(Sweden) Andreas Harnebring
Linesmen:
(Italy) Matthias Cristeli
(Switzerland) Simon Wust

	0–1	02:57 – Wurm (M. Bruijsten, Nagtzaam) (PP)
Cowley (O'Connor, D. Phillips) – 03:35	1–1
Phillips (O'Connor, Boxill) – 17:12	2–1
O'Connor – 28:23	3–1
	3–2	33:06 – K. Bruijsten (Oosterveld)
	3–3	34:01 – Brekelmans (Dalhuisen, Wurm)
Tait (Lee) – 36:01	4–3
	4–4	43:22 – M. Bruijsten (Dalhuisen, Hagemeijer)
Shields (Lee, Richardson) – 49:17	5–4
	5–5	51:08 – Hagemeijer (Nagtzaam)
Richardson (J. Phillips, Peacock) – 55:48	6–5

14 min
Penalties
10 min
35
Shots
33

11 February 2016; 20:45	Italy	8–0 (3–0, 3–0, 2–0)	Serbia	Stadio Olympica, Cortina d'Ampezzo; Attendance: 814

Game reference

Andreas Bernard
Goalies
Arsenije Ranković
Referees:
(Finland) Petri Lindqvist
(Germany) Ladislav Smetana
Linesmen:
(Slovenia) Grega Markizeti
(Poland) Wojciech Moszczyński

Marchetti (Devergilio, Gander) – 01:00	1–0
Plastino (Insam) – 12:46	2–0
Devergilio (Zanette, Larkin) – 16:40	3–0
Frank (Andergassen, Helfer) – 32:59	4–0
Gander (Marchetti, Zanette) – 35:31	5–0
Egger (Ant. Bernard, Ramoser) (PP) – 36:30	6–0
D. Kostner – 42:54	7–0
Plastino – 51:58	8–0

2 min
Penalties
14 min
70
Shots
4

13 February 2016; 17:00	Great Britain	6–2 (2–1, 2–1, 2–0)	Serbia	Stadio Olympica, Cortina d'Ampezzo; Attendance: 489

Game reference

Steven Lyle
Goalies
Arsenije Ranković
Referees:
(Sweden) Andreas Harnebring
(Germany) Ladislav Smetana
Linesmen:
(Italy) Matthias Cristeli
(Switzerland) Simon Wust

Shields (Swindlehurst) – 04:28	1–0
	1–1	08:03 – Raković (Zwick)
Davies (Lachowicz) – 11:27	2–1
	2–2	25:44 – Bjelogrlić (Filipović) (PP2)
Boxill (D. Phillips, Shields) – 29:50	3–2
Clarke (Lee, Lachowicz) (PP2) – 35:27	4–2
Clarke (Peacock, Shields) (PP) – 54:54	5–2
Lachowicz (Myers) (SH) – 59:37	6–2

12 min
Penalties
16 min
52
Shots
16

13 February 2016; 20:45	Netherlands	2–4 (1–2, 1–1, 0–1)	Italy	Stadio Olympica, Cortina d'Ampezzo; Attendance: 862

Game reference

Martijn Oosterwijk
Goalies
Thomas Tragust
Referees:
(Germany) Marcus Brill
(Finland) Petri Linqvist
Linesmen:
(Slovenia) Grega Markizeti
(Russia) Eduard Metalnikov

	0–1	00:39 – Insam
Marx (Dalhuisen) – 02:39	1–1
	1–2	09:55 – D. Kostner (S. Kostner, Helfer)
Hagemeijer (M. Bruijsten) – 20:08	2–2
	2–3	33:11 – Devergilio (Helfer, Zanette)
	2–4	51:53 – Frigo (D. Kostner)

12 min
Penalties
8 min
19
Shots
32

14 February 2016; 17:00	Serbia	3–7 (0–2, 2–2, 1–3)	Netherlands	Stadio Olympica, Cortina d'Ampezzo; Attendance: 428

Game reference

Arsenije Ranković
Goalies
Martijn Oosterwijk
Ruud Leeuwesteijn
Referees:
(Sweden) Andreas Harnebring
(Finland) Petri Lindqvist
Linesmen:
(Italy) Matthias Cristeli
(Slovenia) Grega Markizeti

	0–1	00:56 – M. Bruijsten (Nagtzaam)
	0–2	16:25 – M. Bruijsten (Collier, Nagtzaam)
Dujmić – 24:59	1–2
Vučurević (Popravko) – 29:59	2–2
	2–3	37:58 – Nagtzaam (M. Bruijsten) (PP)
	2–4	39:11 – Dalhuisen
Filipović (Milovanović) (SH) – 54:58	3–4
	3–5	55:18 – Dalhuisen (Stempher) (PP)
	3–6	55:51 – Staats (Wurm, Brekelmans)
	3–7	57:19 – K. Bruijsten (Stempher, Dalhuisen)

8 min
Penalties
6 min
23
Shots
59

14 February 2016; 20:45	Italy	6–2 (3–0, 1–1, 2–1)	Great Britain	Stadio Olympica, Cortina d'Ampezzo; Attendance: 781

Game reference

Andreas Bernard
Goalies
Ben Bowns
Referees:
(Germany) Marcus Brill
(Germany) Ladislav Smetana
Linesmen:
(Russia) Eduard Metalnikov
(Poland) Wojciech Moszczyński

Egger (Ramoser) (PP) – 08:15	1–0
Ant. Bernard (Egger, Ramoser) (PP) – 10:05	2–0
S. Kostner (Borgatello, Helfer) – 15:26	3–0
Borgatello (Insam) – 35:56	4–0
	4–1	38:25 – Tait (D. Phillips, Lee) (PP)
	4–2	45:01 – Clarke (O'Connor, Shields) (PP)
Gellert (Plastino) – 47:23	5–2
Ramoser (Ant. Bernard, Insam) (ENG) – 59:26	6–2

14 min
Penalties
22 min
32
Shots
27

=== Group H ===
Games were played at the László Papp Budapest Sports Arena at Budapest, Hungary.

Pos	Team	Pld	W	OTW	OTL	L	GF	GA	GD	Pts	Qualification
1	Poland	3	2	1	0	0	16	3	+13	8	Final qualification
2	Hungary (H)	3	2	0	1	0	11	2	+9	7	
3	Estonia	3	1	0	0	2	7	14	−7	3	
4	Lithuania	3	0	0	0	3	2	17	−15	0	

Source: IIHF
Rules for classification: 1) points; 2) head-to-head points; 3) head-to-head goal difference; 4) head-to-head number of goals scored; 5) result against closest best-ranked team outside tied teams; 6) result against second-best ranked team outside tied teams; 7) seeding before tournament.
(H) Host

All times are local (UTC+1).

11 February 2016; 16:00	Poland	6–2 (3–0, 2–1, 1–1)	Estonia	László Papp Budapest Sports Arena, Budapest; Attendance: 858

Game reference

Kamil Kosowski
Goalies
Roman Sumikhin
Referees:
(Czech Republic) Pavel Hodek
(Switzerland) Daniel Stricker
Linesmen:
(Hungary) Botond Pálkövi
(Germany) Nikolaj Ponomarjow

Wronka (Bepierszcz) – 01:50	1–0
Chmielewski (Pasiut, Łopuski) (PP) – 15:00	2–0
Guzik (Wajda) – 18:53	3–0
	3–1	20:50 – Petrov (Makrov, Shvarogin)
Bepierszcz (Dziubiński) – 21:41	4–1
Kolusz (Malasiński) – 23:06	5–1
	5–2	43:08 – Petrov (Rooba)
Rompkowski (Dziubiński, Chmielewski) – 45:33	6–2

4 min
Penalties
6 min
64
Shots
16

11 February 2016; 19:30	Lithuania	0–4 (0–1, 0–1, 0–2)	Hungary	László Papp Budapest Sports Arena, Budapest; Attendance: 7,110

Game reference

Mantas Armalis
Goalies
Miklós Rajna
Referees:
(United Kingdom) Michael Hicks
(Sweden) Linus Öhlund
Linesmen:
(Norway) Remi Aasum
(Austria) Michael Hofstätter

0–1	14:25 – Galló (Benk, K. Nagy)
0–2	27:43 – Hári (Bartalis)
0–3	42:34 – Banham (Kóger, Sarauer) (PP)
0–4	45:09 – Kiss (Sarauer)

8 min
Penalties
8 min
19
Shots
60

12 February 2016; 14:30	Poland	9–1 (2–0, 5–0, 2–1)	Lithuania	László Papp Budapest Sports Arena, Budapest; Attendance: 640

Game reference

Przemysław Odrobny
Goalies
Mantas Armalis
Artur Pavliukov
Referees:
(Sweden) Linus Öhlund
(Switzerland) Daniel Stricker
Linesmen:
(Austria) Michael Hofstätter
(Hungary) Botond Pálkövi

Chmielewski (Pasiut) – 15:01	1–0
Chmielewski (Łopuski) – 17:26	2–0
Zapala (Malasiński) – 20:35	3–0
Urbanowicz (Dronia) – 23:12	4–0
Dziubiński (Kotlorz) (PP) – 25:29	5–0
Malasiński – 37:29	6–0
Dziubinski (Pociecha, Wronka) (PP) – 39:42	7–0
Zapala (Rompkowski, Kolusz) – 40:33	8–0
Bepierszcz (Wronka, Kruczek) – 52:20	9–0
	9–1	55:05 – Bogdziul

10 min
Penalties
10 min
56
Shots
39

12 February 2016; 18:00	Hungary	7–1 (2–0, 2–1, 3–0)	Estonia	László Papp Budapest Sports Arena, Budapest; Attendance: 8,100

Game reference

Zoltán Hetényi
Goalies
Villem-Henrik Koitmaa
Referees:
(United Kingdom) Michael Hicks
(Czech Republic) Pavel Hodek
Linesmen:
(Latvia) Raivis Jučers
(Germany) Nikolaj Ponomarjow

Sofron (Kóger, Sarauer) –01:50	1–0
Galló (Gõz) – 15:12	2–0
Sofron (Kóger, Sarauer) (PP) – 23:31	3–0
	3–1	26:45 – Rooba (Makrov)
Banham (Hári) – 31:51	4–1
Vincze (K. Nagy) – 43:15	5–1
Vincze (Kóger, Sofron) (PP) – 56:27	6–1
Sarauer (Vincze) (PP) – 58:33	7–1

8 min
Penalties
18 min
62
Shots
19

14 February 2016; 14:30	Estonia	4–1 (3–1, 0–0, 1–0)	Lithuania	László Papp Budapest Sports Arena, Budapest; Attendance: 950

Game reference

Henrik-Villem Koitmaa
Goalies
Mantas Armalis
Referees:
(United Kingdom) Michael Hicks
(Czech Republic) Pavel Hodek
Linesmen:
(Norway) Remi Aasum
(Hungary) Botond Pálkövi

Makrov (Petrov, Rooba) – 00:43	1–0
Shvarogin (Rooba) (PP) – 02:34	2–0
	2–1	13:24 – Nomanovas (Katulis, Kieras) (PP)
Konyshev (Sorokin) – 15:56	3–1
Makrov (Petrov) (PP) – 43:59	4–1

16 min
Penalties
12 min
26
Shots
56

14 February 2016; 18:00	Hungary	0–1 GWS (0–0, 0–0, 0–0) (OT 0–0) (SO: 0–1)	Poland	László Papp Budapest Sports Arena, Budapest; Attendance: 9,000

Game reference
Miklós Rajna	Goalies	Przemysław Odrobny	Referees: (Sweden) Linus Öhlund (Switzerland) Daniel Stricker; Linesmen: (Latvia) Raivis Jučers (Germany) Nikolaj Ponomarjow
Vas (miss); Sarauer (miss); Banham (miss)	Shootout	Zapala; (miss) Chmielewski	Referees: (Sweden) Linus Öhlund (Switzerland) Daniel Stricker; Linesmen: (Latvia) Raivis Jučers (Germany) Nikolaj Ponomarjow
8 min	Penalties	4 min	Referees: (Sweden) Linus Öhlund (Switzerland) Daniel Stricker; Linesmen: (Latvia) Raivis Jučers (Germany) Nikolaj Ponomarjow
38	Shots	27	Referees: (Sweden) Linus Öhlund (Switzerland) Daniel Stricker; Linesmen: (Latvia) Raivis Jučers (Germany) Nikolaj Ponomarjow

=== Group J ===
Games were played in Sapporo, Japan.

Pos	Team	Pld	W	OTW	OTL	L	GF	GA	GD	Pts	Qualification
1	Japan (H)	3	3	0	0	0	12	1	+11	9	Final qualification
2	Ukraine	3	2	0	0	1	10	2	+8	6	
3	Croatia	3	1	0	0	2	4	10	−6	3	
4	Romania	3	0	0	0	3	1	14	−13	0	

Source: IIHF
Rules for classification: 1) points; 2) head-to-head points; 3) head-to-head goal difference; 4) head-to-head number of goals scored; 5) result against closest best-ranked team outside tied teams; 6) result against second-best ranked team outside tied teams; 7) seeding before tournament.
(H) Host

All times are local (UTC+9).

11 February 2016; 14:30	Ukraine	3–0 (0–0, 2–0, 1–0)	Romania	Tsukisamu Gymnasium, Sapporo; Attendance: 1,020

Game reference

Eduard Zakharchenko
Goalies
Attila Adorján
Referees:
(Hungary) Péter Gebei
(Russia) Alexey Ravodin
Linesmen:
(Japan) Shinobu Kawai
(Finland) Jani Pesonen

Luhovy (Kuzmik, Mikhnov) – 29:32	1–0
Mikhnov (Bondaryev) – 38:19	2–0
Gnidnko (Isayenko, Kicha) – 54:35	3–0

22 min
Penalties
10 min
48
Shots
27

11 February 2016; 18:00	Croatia	0–3 (0–0, 0–1, 0–2)	Japan	Tsukisamu Gymnasium, Sapporo; Attendance: 1,828

Game reference

Mate Tomljenović
Goalies
Yutaka Fukufuji
Referees:
(United States) Stephen Reneau
(Germany) Gordon Schukies
Linesmen:
(Switzerland) Cedric Borga
(United States) Dana Penkivech

0–1	34:50 – Osawa (Hashiba) (EA)
0–2	55:39 – Osawa (Mitamura, Hashimoto)
0–3	55:39 – Tanaka (Hirano)

4 min
Penalties
8 min
8
Shots
43

13 February 2016; 14:30	Ukraine	6–0 (3–0, 1–0, 2–0)	Croatia	Tsukisamu Gymnasium, Sapporo; Attendance: 1,227

Game reference

Eduard Zakharchenko
Goalies
Vilim Rosandić
Referees:
(Russia) Alexey Ravodin
(Germany) Gordon Schukies
Linesmen:
(Canada) Benoit Martineau
(United States) Dana Penkivech

Gnidenko (Kicha, Petrangovsky) – 01:00	1–0
Pobyedonostsev (Bondaryev) – 07:28	2–0
Petrangovsky (Kicha) – 15:42	3–0
Kicha (Petrangovsky, Gnidenko) (PP) – 24:06	4–0
Blagy (Mikhnov, Bondaryev) – 49:21	5–0
Bondaryev (Andreikiv, Blagy) – 59:55	6–0

6 min
Penalties
10 min
57
Shots
26

13 February 2016; 18:00	Japan	7–0 (0–0, 5–0, 2–0)	Romania	Tsukisamu Gymnasium, Sapporo; Attendance: 2,265

Game reference

Takuto Onoda
Goalies
Gellért Ruczuj
Referees:
(Hungary) Peter Gebei
(United States) Stephen Reneau
Linesmen:
(Switzerland) Cedric Borga
(Finland) Jani Pesonen

Kuji (Obara, Takahashi) – 25:29	1–0
Hirano (Tanaka, Yanadori) – 33:23	2–0
Ueno (Haga, Taka. Yamashita) – 35:29	3–0
Nishiwaki (Obara, Kuji) – 36:18	4–0
Obara (Kuji, Takahashi) – 37:03	5–0
Kuji (Obara) (PP) – 52:08	6–0
Taku. Yamashita (Ueno, Nishiwaki) – 57:23	7–0

4 min
Penalties
8 min
39
Shots
14

14 February 2016; 14:30	Romania	1–4 (0–1, 1–2, 0–1)	Croatia	Tsukisamu Gymnasium, Sapporo; Attendance: 1,003

Game reference

Attila Adorján
Goalies
Mate Tomljenović
Referees:
(Hungary) Péter Gebei
(Germany) Gordon Schukies
Linesmen:
(Japan) Shinobu Kawai
(United States) Dana Penkivech

	0–1	06:59 – Kanaet (Šakić, Blagus)
Molnár (Constantin) – 26:30	1–1
	1–2	31:08 – Mikulić (Janković, Mirić)
	1–3	39:09 – Novak (Puzić)
	1–4	58:53 – Šakić (Kanaet) (ENG)

6 min
Penalties
4 min
25
Shots
41

14 February 2016; 18:00	Japan	2–1 (0–0, 0–0, 2–1)	Ukraine	Tsukisamu Gymnasium, Sapporo; Attendance: 2,000

Game reference

Yutaka Fukufuji
Goalies
Eduard Zakharchenko
Referees:
(Russia) Alexey Ravodin
(United States) Stephen Reneau
Linesmen:
(Canada) Benoit Martineau
(Finland) Jani Pesonen

Takagi (Osawa, Taka. Yamashita) – 46:19	1–0
Obara (Ueno) (PP) – 50:32	2–0
	2–1	54:36 – Petrangovsky (Gnidenko)

22 min
Penalties
35 min
30
Shots
33

== Final qualification ==
Three round robins were played from 1 to 4 September 2016. The teams seeded 9th, 10th, and 11th reserved the right to host these tournaments. The top two seeded group winners qualified for the Olympic tournament Group C, and the third seeded group winner qualified for Group B.

=== Group D ===
Games were played in Minsk, Belarus.

Pos	Team	Pld	W	OTW	OTL	L	GF	GA	GD	Pts	Qualification
1	Slovenia	3	2	1	0	0	12	3	+9	8	2018 Winter Olympics
2	Belarus (H)	3	2	0	1	0	12	8	+4	7	
3	Denmark	3	1	0	0	2	7	10	−3	3	
4	Poland	3	0	0	0	3	6	16	−10	0	

Source: IIHF
Rules for classification: 1) points; 2) head-to-head points; 3) head-to-head goal difference; 4) head-to-head number of goals scored; 5) result against closest best-ranked team outside tied teams; 6) result against second-best ranked team outside tied teams; 7) seeding before tournament.
(H) Host

All times are local (UTC+3).

1 September 2016; 15:00	Slovenia	6–1 (2–0, 3–0, 1–1)	Poland	Minsk-Arena, Minsk; Attendance: 1,800

Game reference

Gašper Krošelj
Goalies
Przemysław Odrobny
Referees:
(Finland) Stefan Fonselius
(Slovakia) Daniel Konc
Linesmen:
(Belarus) Dmitry Golyak
(Russia) Yury Ivanov

Kopitar (Urbas, Pance) (PP) – 15:50	1–0
Jeglič (Tičar, Verlič) – 17:38	2–0
Muršak (Ograjenšek, Gregorc) – 24:46	3–0
Kopitar (Gregorc, Sabolič) (PP) – 28:41	4–0
Kranjc (Muršak, Ograjenšek) – 32:48	5–0
Kopitar (Repe, Kovačevič) – 40:16	6–0
	6–1	57:12 – Dziubinski (Dronia, Wronka)

6 min
Penalties
12 min
30
Shots
20

1 September 2016; 19:00	Denmark	2–5 (1–2, 0–0, 1–3)	Belarus	Minsk-Arena, Minsk; Attendance: 15,086

Game reference

Frederik Andersen
Goalies
Kevin Lalande
Referees:
(Germany) Daniel Piechaczek
(Sweden) Marcus Vinnerborg
Linesmen:
(Slovakia) Martin Korba
(Estonia) Anton Semjonov

N. Jensen (Boedker) – 02:46	1–0
	1–1	11:50 – Pavlovich (Linglet, Stas)
	1–2	17:08 – Volkov (Lisovets) (SH)
	1–3	43:46 – S. Kostitsyn (Graborenko) (PP)
	1–4	53:17 – Stas (Platt)
Hansen (Ehlers, F. Nielsen) (PP2, EA) – 58:41	2–4
	2–5	59:24 – S. Kostitsyn (ENG)

10 min
Penalties
24 min
32
Shots
22

2 September 2016; 15:00	Slovenia	3–0 (0–0, 1–0, 2–0)	Denmark	Minsk-Arena, Minsk; Attendance: 2,090

Game reference

Gašper Krošelj
Goalies
Frederik Andersen
Sebastian Dahm
Referees:
(Slovakia) Daniel Konc
(Sweden) Marcus Vinnerborg
Linesmen:
(Belarus) Dmitry Golyak
(Germany) Lukas Kohlmüller

Kovačevič – 24:18	1–0
Mušič (Kuralt) – 49:18	2–0
Urbas (Kopitar) – 57:49	3–0

29 min
Penalties
4 min
21
Shots
32

2 September 2016; 19:00	Belarus	5–3 (4–2, 1–0, 0–1)	Poland	Minsk-Arena, Minsk; Attendance: 10,820

Game reference

Kevin Lalande
Mikhail Karnaukhov
Goalies
Rafał Radziszewski
Referees:
(Finland) Stefan Fonselius
(Germany) Daniel Piechaczek
Linesmen:
(Russia) Yury Ivanov
(Estonia) Anton Semjonov

	0–1	05:35 – Bychawski (Wajda)
	0–2	08:59 – Chmielewski (Łopuski, Pasiut)
Bailen (Stepanov, S. Kostitsyn) (PP) – 13:51	1–2
Stepanov (Bailen, A. Kostitsyn) (PP2) – 15:45	2–2
Graborenko (Stas, S. Kostitsyn) (PP) – 16:18	3–2
Stas (Linglet, Platt) – 19:32	4–2
A. Kostitsyn (S. Kostitsyn, Gavrus) – 38:01	5–2
	5–3	59:15 – Pociecha (Bryk, Wronka) (PP)

6 min
Penalties
14 min
33
Shots
15

4 September 2016; 13:00	Poland	2–5 (1–1, 0–2, 1–2)	Denmark	Minsk-Arena, Minsk; Attendance: 2,390

Game reference

Przemysław Odrobny
Goalies
Sebastian Dahm
Referees:
(Slovakia) Daniel Konc
(Germany) Daniel Piechaczek
Linesmen:
(Germany) Lukas Kohlmüller
(Estonia) Anton Semjonov

	0–1	03:07 – Storm (F. Nielsen, Bau)
Kalinowski (Chichy, Urbanowicz) – 13:10	1–1
	1–2	25:53 – Bødker (N. Jensen, J. Jensen)
	1–3	35:29 – Larsen (N. Jensen, F. Nielsen) (PP)
	1–4	42:02 – Ehlers (Bjorkstrand, Larsen)
Urbanowicz (Kalinowski)	2–4
	2–5	52:24 – Madsen (N. Jensen)

4 min
Penalties
4 min
18
Shots
26

4 September 2016; 17:00	Belarus	2–3 GWS (0–0, 1–2, 1–0); OT (0–0); SO (0–1)	Slovenia	Minsk-Arena, Minsk; Attendance: 15,086

Game reference

Mikhail Karnaukhov
Goalies
Gašper Krošelj
Referees:
(Finland) Stefan Fonselius
(Sweden) Marcus Vinnerborg
Linesmen:
(Russia) Yury Ivanov
(Slovakia) Martin Korba

	0–1	21:45 – Tičar (Kopitar) (PP2)
	0–2	22:49 – Tičar (Jeglič, Robar) (PP)
Stepanov (Kovyrshin, Kulakov) – 38:08	1–2
Stepanov (Bailen, S. Kostitsyn) (PP) – 51:41	2–2

Kulakov (miss)
Stepanov
A. Kostitsyn (miss)
Shootout
(miss) Sabolič
Kopitar
Tičar
6 min
Penalties
6 min
29
Shots
32

=== Group E ===
Games were played in Riga, Latvia.

Pos	Team	Pld	W	OTW	OTL	L	GF	GA	GD	Pts	Qualification
1	Germany	3	3	0	0	0	14	2	+12	9	2018 Winter Olympics
2	Latvia (H)	3	2	0	0	1	13	5	+8	6	
3	Austria	3	1	0	0	2	4	14	−10	3	
4	Japan	3	0	0	0	3	1	11	−10	0	

Source: IIHF
Rules for classification: 1) points; 2) head-to-head points; 3) head-to-head goal difference; 4) head-to-head number of goals scored; 5) result against closest best-ranked team outside tied teams; 6) result against second-best ranked team outside tied teams; 7) seeding before tournament.
(H) Host

All times are local (UTC+3).

1 September 2016; 15:30	Germany	5–0 (2–0, 3–0, 0–0)	Japan	Arena Riga, Riga; Attendance: 979

Game reference

Philipp Grubauer
Goalies
Yutaka Fukufuji
Takuto Onoda
Referees:
(Hungary) Peter Gebei
(Sweden) Mikael Nord
Linesmen:
(Latvia) Maksims Bogdanovs
(United Kingdom) Andrew Dalton

Macek (Draisaitl) – 03:26	1–0
Schütz (Hager, Rieder) (PP) – 17:22	2–0
Rieder (Draisaitl, Macek) – 22:07	3–0
Kühnackl (PP) – 24:44	4–0
Schütz (Hager, D. Seidenberg) (PP) – 27:56	5–0

6 min
Penalties
16 min
51
Shots
13

1 September 2016; 19:30	Austria	1–8 (1–2, 0–3, 0–3)	Latvia	Arena Riga, Riga; Attendance: 4,210

Game reference

David Kickert
David Madlener
Goalies
Kristers Gudļevskis
Referees:
(Czech Republic) Martin Fraňo
(Finland) Aleksi Rantala
Linesmen:
(Denmark) Rene Jensen
(Czech Republic) Rudolf Tošenovjan

	0–1	05:41 – Daugaviņš (Indrašis, K. Rēdlihs)
	0–2	11:23 – Džeriņš (Dārziņš) (SH)
Hundertpfund (Geier, Herburger) – 16:39	1–2
	1–3	25:18 – Bukarts (Meija)
	1–4	27:36 – Daugavins (M. Rēdlihs, Darzins) (PP)
	1–5	38:48 – Ķēniņš (Ābols, K. Rēdlihs)
	1–6	43:57 – Indrašis (Daugaviņš, Karsums)
	1–7	46:11 – Dzierkals (Ābols, Ķēniņš)
	1–8	56:45 – Ābols (Ķēniņš, Bārtulis)

16 min
Penalties
12 min
23
Shots
31

2 September 2016; 15:30	Germany	6–0 (1–0, 2–0, 3–0)	Austria	Arena Riga, Riga; Attendance: 1,062

Game reference

Philipp Grubauer
Goalies
David Kickert
Referees:
(Sweden) Mikael Nord
(Finland) Aleksi Rantala
Linesmen:
(Latvia) Maksims Bogdanovs
(Czech Republic) Rudolf Tošenovjan

Goc (Kink, Y. Seidenberg) – 14:22	1–0
Hager (Schütz, Müller) – 28:04	2–0
Müller (Goc) – 37:20	3–0
Reimer (Kahun, Akdag) – 42:16	4–0
Schütz (Rieder, Kahun) (PP) – 54:24	5–0
Draisaitl (Reimer) (PP) – 58:00	6–0

8 min
Penalties
8 min
31
Shots
25

2 September 2016; 19:30	Latvia	3–1 (0–0, 1–0, 2–1)	Japan	Arena Riga, Riga; Attendance: 3,851

Game reference

Elvis Merzļikins
Goalies
Yutaka Fukufuji
Referees:
(Czech Republic) Martin Fraňo
(Hungary) Peter Gebei
Linesmen:
(United Kingdom) Andrew Dalton
(Slovenia) Gašper Zganc

Džeriņš (Sotnieks, K. Rēdlihs) – 35:54	1–0
Karsums (Bārtulis, Indrašis) (PP) – 46:16	2–0
	2–1	57:46 – Kuji (Takahashi)
Džeriņš (Dārziņš, M. Rēdlihs) (ENG) – 59:52	3–1

8 min
Penalties
4 min
41
Shots
18

4 September 2016; 14:00	Japan	0–3 (0–1, 0–0, 0–2)	Austria	Arena Riga, Riga; Attendance: 727

Game reference

Yutaka Fukufuji
Goalies
David Kickert
Referees:
(Hungary) Peter Gebei
(Sweden) Mikael Nord
Linesmen:
(Latvia) Maksims Bogdanovs
(Slovenia) Gašper Zganc

0–1	18:23 – Grabner (Herburger, M. Raffl) (PP)
0–2	47:27 – Kristler (Schumnig) (PP)
0–3	58:33 – T. Raffl (Fischer)

4 min
Penalties
8 min
24
Shots
40

4 September 2016; 18:00	Latvia	2–3 (0–1, 1–1, 1–1)	Germany	Arena Riga, Riga; Attendance: 10,035

Game reference

Kristers Gudļevskis
Elvis Merzļikins
Goalies
Philipp Grubauer
Referees:
(Czech Republic) Martin Fraňo
(Finland) Aleksi Rantala
Linesmen:
(Denmark) Rene Jensen
(Czech Republic) Rudolf Tošenovjan

	0–1	16:18 – Draisaitl (Kühnhackl, Reimer) (PP)
	0–2	24:51 – Schütz (Hager, Kahun)
Indrašis (Bārtulis, Daugaviņš) (PP) – 34:55	1–2
Karsums (Indrašis, Daugaviņš) (PP) – 46:19	2–2
	2–3	54:51 – Kühnhackl (Macek, Draisaitl) (PP)

6 min
Penalties
10 min
28
Shots
27

=== Group F ===
Games were played in Oslo, Norway.

Pos	Team	Pld	W	OTW	OTL	L	GF	GA	GD	Pts	Qualification
1	Norway (H)	3	2	0	1	0	9	6	+3	7	2018 Winter Olympics
2	France	3	1	1	0	1	7	4	+3	5 (Note: France 4–1 Kazakhstan)	
3	Kazakhstan	3	1	1	0	1	8	9	−1	5	
4	Italy	3	0	0	1	2	4	9	−5	1	

Source: IIHF
Rules for classification: 1) points; 2) head-to-head points; 3) head-to-head goal difference; 4) head-to-head number of goals scored; 5) result against closest best-ranked team outside tied teams; 6) result against second-best ranked team outside tied teams; 7) seeding before tournament.
(H) Host
Notes:

All times are local (UTC+2).

1 September 2016; 16:00	France	2–1 OT (0–0, 1–1, 0–0) (OT 1–0)	Italy	Jordal Amfi, Oslo; Attendance: 643

Game reference

Cristobal Huet
Goalies
Andreas Bernard
Referees:
(United States) Stephen Reneau
(Belarus) Maxim Sidorenko
Linesmen:
(Netherlands) Joep Leermakers
(United Kingdom) Alexander Waldejer

	0–1	23:20 – D. Kostner (S. Kostner) (PP)
Chakiachvili (Hecquefeuille) – 25:40	1–1
S. Da Costa (Bellemare, Chakiachvili) – 60:27	2–1

16 min
Penalties
4 min
31
Shots
24

1 September 2016; 20:00	Kazakhstan	4–3 OT (0–0, 3–1, 0–2) (OT 1–0)	Norway	Jordal Amfi, Oslo; Attendance: 2,714

Game reference

Vitali Kolesnik
Dmitri Malgin
Goalies
Lars Haugen
Referees:
(Slovakia) Jozef Kubuš
(Germany) Gordon Schukies
Linesmen:
(Finland) Masi Puolakka
(Russia) Stanislav Raming

Starchenko (Rymarev) (PP) – 21:23	1–0
	1–1	23:48 – Zuccarello (Bastiansen)
Dallman (Ivanov) – 31:27	2–1
Starchenko – 34:26	3–1
	3–2	58:43 – Holøs (Zuccarello, Thoresen) (EA)
	3–3	59:46 – Bastiansen (EA)
Bochenski (Dawes, Dallman) – 60:31	4–3

10 min
Penalties
6 min
21
Shots
41

2 September 2016; 16:00	France	4–1 (2–1, 0–0, 2–0)	Kazakhstan	Jordal Amfi, Oslo; Attendance: 378

Game reference

Cristobal Huet
Goalies
Vitali Kolesnik
Referees:
(Germany) Gordon Schukies
(Belarus) Maxim Sidorenko
Linesmen:
(Finland) Masi Puolakka
(United Kingdom) Alexander Waldejer

	0–1	00:20 – Dawes
S. Treille (Chakiachvili) – 07:10	1–1
Fleury (S. Da Costa) – 15:32	2–1
Fleury (Janil) – 55:31	3–1
Douay (Y. Treille) – 57:40	4–1

6 min
Penalties
6 min
29
Shots
25

2 September 2016; 20:00	Norway	4–1 (2–0, 0–1, 2–0)	Italy	Jordal Amfi, Oslo; Attendance: 3,751

Game reference

Lars Haugen
Goalies
Frederic Cloutier
Referees:
(Slovakia) Jozef Kubuš
(United States) Stephen Reneau
Linesmen:
(Hungary) Balázs Kovács
(Netherlands) Joep Leermakers

M. Olimb (Thoresen) – 08:35	1–0
Kristiansen (Thoresen, Zuccarello) (PP) – 18:39	2–0
	2–1	34:51 – Traversa (Spinell)
Holøs (M. Olimb, K. Olimb) (PP) – 51:26	3–1
Martinsen (K. Olimb) (PP) – 57:51	4–1

14 min
Penalties
31 min
34
Shots
13

4 September 2016; 11:30	Italy	2–3 (1–1, 1–1, 0–1)	Kazakhstan	Jordal Amfi, Oslo; Attendance: 386

Game reference

Frédéric Cloutier
Andreas Bernard
Goalies
Vitali Kolesnik
Referees:
(Slovakia) Jozef Kubuš
(Germany) Gordon Schukies
Linesmen:
(Hungary) Balázs Kovács
(United Kingdom) Alexander Waldejer

Scandella (Ant. Bernard, Insam) – 06:47	1–0
	1–1	08:51 – Khudyakov (Rymarev, Shin) (PP)
	1–2	28:42 – Bochenski (Shin)
Traversa (S. Marchetti, Zanatta) (PP) – 38:54	2–2
	2–3	56:12 – Starchenko (Tryasunov, Savchenko)

2 min
Penalties
4 min
15
Shots
21

4 September 2016; 15:00	Norway	2–1 (0–0, 1–1, 1–0)	France	Jordal Amfi, Oslo; Attendance: 4,277

Game reference

Lars Haugen
Goalies
Cristobal Huet
Referees:
(United States) Stephen Reneau
(Belarus) Maxim Sidorenko
Linesmen:
(Finland) Masi Puolakka
(Russia) Stanislav Raming

	0–1	21:49 – Y. Treille (Meunier)
Zuccarello (Thoresen) – 26:59	1–1
Nørstebø (Martinsen) (PP) – 57:31	2–1

10 min
Penalties
24 min
22
Shots
22
