= 2015 IIHF World Championship Division I =

Tournament details
- Host countries: Poland; Netherlands
- Venues: 2 (in 2 host cities)
- Dates: 19–25 April; 13–19 April
- Teams: 12

The 2015 IIHF World Championship Division I was an international ice hockey tournament run by the International Ice Hockey Federation. Group A was contested in Kraków, Poland, after the original host, Donetsk, Ukraine, withdrew due to the Russian invasion, from 19 to 25 April 2015 and Group B was held in Eindhoven, Netherlands, from 13 to 19 April 2015.

In Group A Kazakhstan finished first, winning their group in Division I for the fourth time in their last four appearances, thereby securing promotion to the 2016 World Championship. Hungary surprised and placed second, defeating host Poland in the final game to secure promotion; it was the first time Hungary earned promotion to the top division since 2009, and only the second time since 1939. Ukraine finished last in the group and was relegated to Group B for 2016.

Group B saw South Korea finish first and win promotion. Great Britain finished second, losing out on first and promotion with a loss to Lithuania in the final game of the tournament. Host Netherlands ended the tournament in last place and was relegated to Division II A for the next year.

== Venues ==
Group A	Group B
Kraków	Eindhoven
Tauron Arena Kraków; Capacity: 15,328	IJssportcentrum Eindhoven; Capacity: 1,700

== Division I A ==
2015 IIHF World Championship Division I A

Tournament details
- Host country: Poland
- Venue: 1 (in 1 host city)
- Dates: 19–25 April
- Teams: 6

Tournament statistics
- Games played: 15
- Goals scored: 71 (4.73 per game)
- Attendance: 66,651 (4,443 per game)
- Scoring leader: (Kazakhstan) Roman Starchenko (6 points)

Official website
- IIHF.com

=== Participants ===
Team	Qualification
Italy	Placed 15th in the Elite Division and were relegated in 2014.
Kazakhstan	Placed 16th in the Elite Division and were relegated in 2014.
Japan	Placed 3rd in Division I A last year.
Ukraine	Placed 4th in Division I A last year.
Hungary	Placed 5th in Division I A last year.
Poland	Host, placed 1st in Division I B last year and were promoted.

=== Match officials ===
7 referees and 7 linesmen were selected for the tournament.

Referees

- (Latvia) Andris Ansons
- (Hungary) Péter Gebei
- (Czech Republic) René Hradil
- (Slovakia) Daniel Konc
- (Sweden) Marcus Linde
- (Slovenia) Viki Trilar
- (Switzerland) Marc Wiegand

Linesman

- (United Kingdom) Andrew Dalton
- (Belarus) Dmitri Golyak
- (Slovenia) Matjaž Hribar
- (Denmark) Rene Jensen
- (Poland) Wojciech Moszczyński
- (Slovakia) Tibor Rovenský
- (Norway) Alexander Waldejer

=== Standings ===
Team	Pld	W	OTW	OTL	L	GF	GA	GD	Pts	Promotion or relegation
Kazakhstan	5	5	0	0	0	23	6	+17	15	Promoted to Top Division for 2016
Hungary	5	4	0	0	1	14	11	+3	12	Promoted to Top Division for 2016
Poland	5	2	0	0	3	9	9	0	6	
Japan	5	2	0	0	3	10	16	−6	6	
Italy	5	1	1	0	3	7	12	−5	5	
Ukraine	5	0	0	1	4	8	17	−9	1	Relegated to Division I B for 2016

Source: IIHF

=== Results ===
All times are local (UTC+2).

19 April 2015; 13:00	Hungary	4–2 (1–1, 1–1, 2–0)	Japan	Tauron Arena Kraków, Kraków; Attendance: 2,543

Game reference

Miklós Rajna
Goalies
Yutaka Fukufuji
Referees:
(Latvia) Andris Ansons
(Switzerland) Marc Wiegand
Linesmen:
(Belarus) Dmitri Golyak
(Poland) Wojciech Moszczyński

	0–1	01:36 – Obara (Minoshima, Nishiwaki)
Koger (Banham, Sarauer) – 09:44	1–1
	1–2	30:40 – Hirano (Yanadori, Yamada) (EA)
Erdély (Sebők, Hári) – 31:04	2–2
Banham (Sarauer, Magosi) (PP) – 56:35	3–2
Hári (Orbán, Erdély) (ENG) – 58:54	4–2

2 min
Penalties
8 min
28
Shots
23

19 April 2015; 16:30	Ukraine	2–5 (0–2, 0–1, 2–2)	Kazakhstan	Tauron Arena Kraków, Kraków; Attendance: 2,108

Game reference

Eduard Zakharchenko
Goalies
Pavel Poluektov
Referees:
(Hungary) Péter Gebei
(Sweden) Marcus Linde
Linesmen:
(United Kingdom) Andrew Dalton
(Slovenia) Matjaž Hribar

	0–1	07:13 – Dallman (PP)
	0–2	14:40 – Metalnikov (Krasnoslobodtsev, Rymarev)
	0–3	31:06 – Krasnoslobodtsev (Rymarev, Litvinenko) (PP)
Nimenko (Varlamov, Kugut) (PP) – 46:39	1–3
	1–4	47:59 – Rudenko (Polishchuk)
	1–5	58:07 – Rymarev (Savenkov)
Mikhnov (Gnidenko, Blagy) – 59:34	2–5

8 min
Penalties
8 min
16
Shots
24

19 April 2015; 20:00	Poland	1–2 (0–1, 1–1, 0–0)	Italy	Tauron Arena Kraków, Kraków; Attendance: 9,456

Game reference

Rafał Radziszewski
Przemysław Odrobny
Goalies
Andreas Bernard
Referees:
(Czech Republic) René Hradil
(Slovenia) Viki Trilar
Linesmen:
(Denmark) Rene Jensen
(Slovakia) Tibor Rovenský

	0–1	13:49 – Ihnacak (Insam)
Pasiut (Kowalówka, Dutka) – 26:22	1–1
	1–2	33:34 – Ant. Bernard (Ramoser) (SH)

29 min
Penalties
10 min
18
Shots
28

20 April 2015; 13:00	Kazakhstan	5–0 (1–0, 3–0, 1–0)	Hungary	Tauron Arena Kraków, Kraków; Attendance: 3,289

Game reference

Pavel Poluektov
Goalies
Bence Bálizs
Referees:
(Czech Republic) René Hradil
(Slovakia) Daniel Konc
Linesmen:
(Slovakia) Tibor Rovenský
(Norway) Alexander Waldejer

Rudenko (Savchenko, Dallman) (PP2) – 01:43	1–0
Vorontsov (Panshin, Litvinenko) – 25:50	2–0
Dallman (Krasnoslobodtsev, Zhailauov) (PP) – 32:12	3–0
Krasnoslobodtsev (Rymarev, Zhailauov) (PP) – 35:36	4–0
Pushkaryov (Zhailauov) – 48:06	5–0

4 min
Penalties
16 min
22
Shots
12

20 April 2015; 16:30	Italy	2–1 OT (0–0, 1–1, 0–0); OT (1–0)	Ukraine	Tauron Arena Kraków, Kraków; Attendance: 1,392

Game reference

Andreas Bernard
Goalies
Eduard Zakharchenko
Referees:
(Latvia) Andris Ansons
(Switzerland) Marc Wiegand
Linesmen:
(Belarus) Dmitri Golyak
(Poland) Wojciech Moszczyński

Ihnacak (Marchetti, Insam) (PP) – 24:26	1–0
	1–1	26:25 – Zakharov (Bondaryev, Pobyedonostsev)
Insam (Egger, Ant. Bernard) – 60:16	2–1

12 min
Penalties
12 min
33
Shots
19

20 April 2015; 20:00	Japan	0–2 (0–0, 0–0, 0–2)	Poland	Tauron Arena Kraków, Kraków; Attendance: 2,662

Game reference
Yutaka Fukufuji	Goalies	Przemysław Odrobny	Referees: (Hungary) Péter Gebei (Sweden) Marcus Linde; Linesmen: (United Kingdom) Andrew Dalton (Slovenia) Matjaž Hribar
0–1 / 42:42 – Malasiński (Zapała, Kolusz) (PP); 0–2 / 50:32 – Kolusz (Rompkowski, Kalinowski)			Referees: (Hungary) Péter Gebei (Sweden) Marcus Linde; Linesmen: (United Kingdom) Andrew Dalton (Slovenia) Matjaž Hribar
2 min	Penalties	4 min	Referees: (Hungary) Péter Gebei (Sweden) Marcus Linde; Linesmen: (United Kingdom) Andrew Dalton (Slovenia) Matjaž Hribar
26	Shots	21	Referees: (Hungary) Péter Gebei (Sweden) Marcus Linde; Linesmen: (United Kingdom) Andrew Dalton (Slovenia) Matjaž Hribar

22 April 2015; 13:00	Kazakhstan	7–2 (3–0, 0–0, 4–2)	Japan	Tauron Arena Kraków, Kraków; Attendance: 2,479

Game reference

Pavel Poluektov
Goalies
Yutaka Fukufuji
Yuto Ito
Referees:
(Slovenia) Viki Trilar
(Switzerland) Marc Wiegand
Linesmen:
(Denmark) Rene Jensen
(Poland) Wojciech Moszczyński

Dallman (Rudenko, Starchenko) – 02:38	1–0
Polishchuk (Semyonov, Dallman) (PP) – 06:48	2–0
Starchenko – 19:03	3–0
	3–1	41:16 – Kuji (G. Tanaka, Nishiwaki)
Starchenko (Panshin, Tryasunov) – 42:35	4–1
Rudenko (Starchenko, Polishchuk) – 45:06	5–1
Rymarev (Krasnoslobodtsev) – 48:09	6–1
Polishchuk (Rudenko) – 52:52	7–1
	7–2	53:51 – G. Tanaka (Kuji, Nishiwaki)

6 min
Penalties
6 min
29
Shots
24

22 April 2015; 16:30	Italy	1–4 (0–2, 0–0, 1–2)	Hungary	Tauron Arena Kraków, Kraków; Attendance: 3,125

Game reference

Andreas Bernard
Goalies
Miklós Rajna
Referees:
(Latvia) Andris Ansons
(Sweden) Marcus Linde
Linesmen:
(United Kingdom) Andrew Dalton
(Slovakia) Tibor Rovenský

	0–1	10:52 – Koger (Banham, Sarauer) (PP)
	0–2	17:52 – Magosi (Nagy)
	0–3	43:01 – Sofron (M. Vas, Koger)
Egger (Ihnacak, Zanatta) – 45:16	1–3
	1–4	59:16 – M. Vas (ENG)

10 min
Penalties
8 min
11
Shots
21

22 April 2015; 20:00	Poland	3–2 (0–0, 1–0, 2–2)	Ukraine	Tauron Arena Kraków, Kraków; Attendance: 5,975

Game reference

Przemysław Odrobny
Goalies
Eduard Zakharchenko
Referees:
(Czech Republic) René Hradil
(Slovakia) Daniel Konc
Linesmen:
(Belarus) Dmitri Golyak
(Norway) Alexander Waldejer

Bagiński (Pasiut) (SH) – 33:13	1–0
Rompkowski (Bryk, Kolusz) – 40:34	2–0
	2–1	41:46 – Gavryk (Zakharchenko)
	2–2	44:52 – Lyalka
Rompkowski (Zapała, Kolusz) (PP) – 53:44	3–2

8 min
Penalties
12 min
24
Shots
19

23 April 2015; 13:00	Japan	3–2 (0–1, 1–0, 2–1)	Italy	Tauron Arena Kraków, Kraków; Attendance: 2,572

Game reference

Yutaka Fukufuji
Goalies
Andreas Bernard
Referees:
(Czech Republic) René Hradil
(Slovakia) Daniel Konc
Linesmen:
(Slovenia) Matjaž Hribar
(Norway) Alexander Waldejer

	0–1	19:34 – Frigo (Gander, Ant. Bernard)
Ushu (Takahashi, Yanadori) – 38:48	1–1
	1–2	47:24 – Ramoser (Ihnacak, Marchetti)
Yanadori (G. Tanaka, Ushu) – 55:56	2–2
Hirano – 57:06	3–2

0 min
Penalties
4 min
26
Shots
26

23 April 2015; 16:30	Ukraine	2–4 (0–0, 2–1, 0–3)	Hungary	Tauron Arena Kraków, Kraków; Attendance: 3,774

Game reference

Eduard Zakharchenko
Goalies
Miklós Rajna
Referees:
(Sweden) Marcus Linde
(Slovenia) Viki Trilar
Linesmen:
(Denmark) Rene Jensen
(Poland) Wojciech Moszczyński

Blagy (Mikhnov, Kugut) (PP) – 24:36	1–0
Gnidenko (Mikhnov, Blagy) (PP) – 34:19	2–0
	2–1	36:44 – Sarauer (Banham, Gõz)
	2–2	51:26 – Koger (Sarauer, Hári) (PP)
	2–3	56:05 – Sarauer (Koger, Sofron)
	2–4	57:15 – Sofron (Kiss) (SH)

6 min
Penalties
8 min
17
Shots
32

23 April 2015; 20:00	Kazakhstan	3–2 (0–0, 2–1, 1–1)	Poland	Tauron Arena Kraków, Kraków; Attendance: 9,067

Game reference

Pavel Poluektov
Goalies
Rafał Radziszewski
Referees:
(Latvia) Andris Ansons
(Hungary) Péter Gebei
Linesmen:
(United Kingdom) Andrew Dalton
(Slovakia) Tibor Rovenský

Savchenko (Dallman, Krasnoslobodtsev) (PP) – 29:34	1–0
	1–1	35:33 – Pociecha (Kowalówka, Chmielewski) (PP2)
Starchenko (Rudenko) – 36:56	2–1
	2–2	48:20 – Kolusz (Bryk, Rompkowski)
Starchenko (Savenkov) – 55:26	3–2

6 min
Penalties
10 min
27
Shots
23

25 April 2015; 13:00	Japan	3–1 (0–0, 3–1, 0–0)	Ukraine	Tauron Arena Kraków, Kraków; Attendance: 2,467

Game reference

Yutaka Fukufuji
Goalies
Eduard Zakharchenko
Referees:
(Latvia) Andris Ansons
(Hungary) Péter Gebei
Linesmen:
(United Kingdom) Andrew Dalton
(Slovakia) Tibor Rovenský

	0–1	28:13 – Blagy (Navarenko) (PP)
Hirano (Yanadori, Obara) (PP) – 30:20	1–1
Ueno (Obara, Minoshima) – 33:22	2–1
Obara (Takahashi) (PP) – 36:00	3–1

14 min
Penalties
12 min
21
Shots
27

25 April 2015; 16:30	Italy	0–3 (0–1, 0–0, 0–2)	Kazakhstan	Tauron Arena Kraków, Kraków; Attendance: 3,110

Game reference

Andreas Bernard
Goalies
Pavel Poluektov
Referees:
(Sweden) Marcus Linde
(Slovenia) Viki Trilar
Linesmen:
(Belarus) Dmitri Golyak
(Denmark) Rene Jensen

0–1	06:42 – Rymarev (Khudyakov)
0–2	45:10 – Zhailauov (Savenkov)
0–3	53:39 – Vorontsov (PS)

6 min
Penalties
4 min
24
Shots
20

25 April 2015; 20:00	Hungary	2–1 (0–0, 0–0, 2–1)	Poland	Tauron Arena Kraków, Kraków; Attendance: 12,632

Game reference

Miklós Rajna
Goalies
Przemysław Odrobny
Referees:
(Slovakia) Daniel Konc
(Switzerland) Marc Wiegand
Linesmen:
(Slovenia) Matjaž Hribar
(Norway) Alexander Waldejer

Hári (Banham, Sebők) – 41:30	1–0
	1–1	56:52 – Bryk (Pasiut, Rompkowski) (EA)
Szirányi (ENG) – 59:54	2–1

4 min
Penalties
6 min
36
Shots
29

=== Awards and statistics ===
==== Awards ====
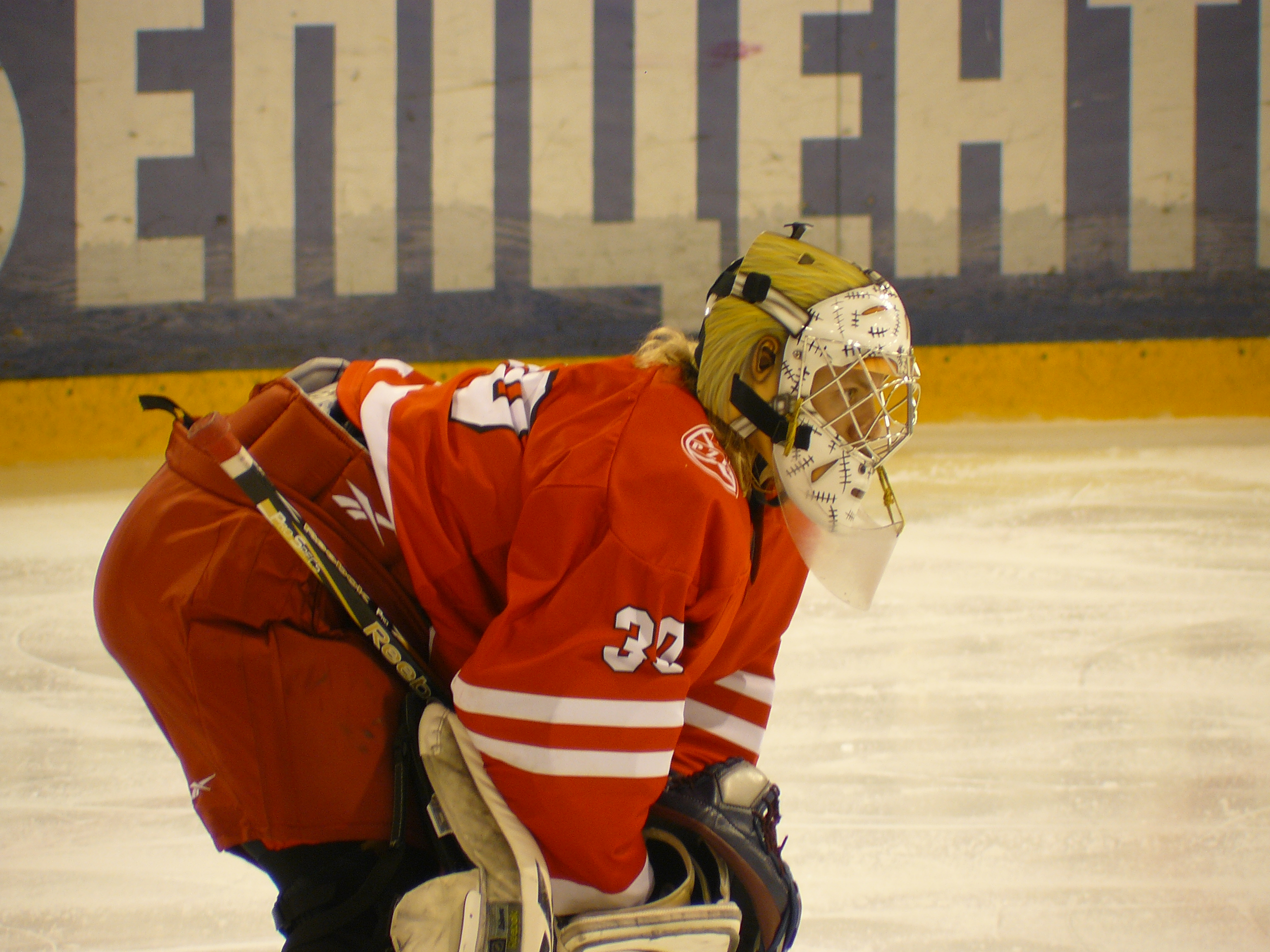
Przemysław Odrobny of Poland was selected as the best goalkeeper.

- Best players selected by the directorate:
  - Best Goalkeeper: (Poland) Przemysław Odrobny
  - Best Defenseman: (Kazakhstan) Kevin Dallman
  - Best Forward: (Kazakhstan) Roman Starchenko

Source: IIHF.com

- Media All-Stars:
  - MVP: (Kazakhstan) Roman Starchenko
  - Goalkeeper: (Kazakhstan) Pavel Poluektov
  - Defenceman: (Kazakhstan) Kevin Dallman / (Poland) Mateusz Rompkowski
  - Forwards: (Kazakhstan) Roman Starchenko / (Hungary) Andrew Sarauer / (Poland) Marcin Kolusz

Source: IIHF.com

==== Scoring leaders ====
List shows the top skaters sorted by points, then goals.

Player	GP	G	A	Pts	+/−	PIM	POS
(Kazakhstan) Roman Starchenko	5	4	2	6	+8	6	F
(Kazakhstan) Kevin Dallman	5	3	3	6	+5	0	D
(Kazakhstan) Konstantin Rudenko	5	3	3	6	+6	2	F
(Kazakhstan) Evgeni Rymarev	5	3	3	6	+3	0	F
(Kazakhstan) Vadim Krasnoslobodtsev	5	2	4	6	+4	0	F
(Hungary) Andrew Sarauer	5	2	4	6	+7	2	F
(Hungary) Dániel Kóger	5	3	2	5	+4	2	F
(Poland) Marcin Kolusz	5	2	3	5	+2	0	F
(Poland) Mateusz Rompkowski	5	2	3	5	+2	4	D
(Hungary) Frank Banham	5	1	4	5	+3	2	F
(Kazakhstan) Talgat Zhailauov	5	1	4	5	0	0	F

GP = Games played; G = Goals; A = Assists; Pts = Points; +/− = Plus/minus; PIM = Penalties in minutes; POS = Position
Source: IIHF.com

==== Goaltending leaders ====
Only the top five goaltenders, based on save percentage, who have played at least 40% of their team's minutes, are included in this list.

Player	TOI	GA	GAA	SA	Sv%	SO
(Poland) Przemysław Odrobny	185:39	3	0.97	85	96.47	1
(Kazakhstan) Pavel Poluektov	300:00	6	1.20	99	93.94	2
(Hungary) Miklós Rajna	240:00	6	1.50	79	92.41	0
(Japan) Yutaka Fukufuji	257:30	11	2.56	111	90.09	0
(Italy) Andreas Bernard	298:00	11	2.21	103	89.32	0

TOI = Time on Ice (minutes:seconds); SA = Shots against; GA = Goals against; GAA = Goals against average; Sv% = Save percentage; SO = Shutouts
Source: IIHF.com

== Division I B ==
2015 IIHF World Championship Division I B

Tournament details
- Host country: Netherlands
- Venue: 1 (in 1 host city)
- Dates: 13–19 April
- Teams: 6

Tournament statistics
- Games played: 15
- Goals scored: 90 (6 per game)
- Attendance: 15,920 (1,061 per game)
- Scoring leader: (South Korea) Michael Swift (9 points)

Official website
- IIHF.com

=== Participants ===
Team	Qualification
South Korea	Placed 6th in Division I A last year and were relegated.
Croatia	Placed 2nd in Division I B last year.
Lithuania	Placed 3rd in Division I B last year.
Great Britain	Placed 4th in Division I B last year.
Netherlands	Host, placed 5th in Division I B last year.
Estonia	Placed 1st in Division II A last year and were promoted.

=== Match officials ===
4 referees and 7 linesmen were selected for the tournament.

Referees

- (Denmark) Jacob Grumsen
- (Canada) Jeff Ingram
- (Finland) Anssi Salonen
- (Austria) Shane Warschaw

Linesmen

- (Netherlands) Louis Beelen
- (Czech Republic) Marek Hlavatý
- (Belgium) Frederic Monnaie
- (Finland) Pasi Nieminen
- (Italy) Ulrich Pardatscher
- (Serbia) David Perduv
- (Japan) Sotaro Yamaguchi

=== Standings ===
Team	Pld	W	OTW	OTL	L	GF	GA	GD	Pts	Promotion or relegation
South Korea	5	4	0	0	1	30	11	+19	12	Promoted to Division I A for 2016
Great Britain	5	3	1	0	1	13	10	+3	11	
Lithuania	5	3	0	0	2	11	12	−1	9	
Croatia	5	2	0	1	2	16	20	−4	7	
Estonia	5	1	0	0	4	10	21	−11	3	
Netherlands	5	1	0	0	4	9	15	−6	3	Relegated to Division II A for 2016

Source: IIHF

=== Results ===
All times are local (UTC+2).

13 April 2015; 13:30	Great Britain	3–2 OT (0–1, 0–0, 2–1) (OT 1–0)	Croatia	IJssportcentrum, Eindhoven; Attendance: 750

Game reference

Ben Bowns
Goalies
Mark Dekanich
Referee:
(Austria) Shane Warschaw
Linesmen:
(Czech Republic) Marek Hlavatý
(Japan) Sotaro Yamaguchi

	0–1	16:57 – Glumac (SH)
	0–2	52:57 – Perkovich (Sertich) (PP)
O'Connor (Myers) (PP) – 52:57	1–2
Richardson (Dowd) (EA) – 59:55	2–2
Richardson (O'Connor) – 60:11	3–2

10 min
Penalties
24 min
36
Shots
30

13 April 2015; 17:00	Estonia	3–7 (1–2, 1–3, 1–2)	South Korea	IJssportcentrum, Eindhoven; Attendance: 750

Game reference

Villem-Henrik Koitmaa
Goalies
Park Kye-hoon
Referee:
(Canada) Jeff Ingram
Linesmen:
(Netherlands) Louis Beelen
(Finland) Pasi Nieminen

	0–1	04:10 – Kim S. (Kim W., Kim K.) (PP)
	0–2	17:20 – Swift (Cho, Lee D.)
Makrov – 18:22	1–2
	1–3	25:01 – Testwuide
Makrov (Rooba) – 32:15	2–3
	2–4	38:31 – Lee You.
	2–5	39:54 – Sung (Testwuide) (SH)
Titarenko (Embrich, Makrov) (PP) – 42:27	3–5
	3–6	47:21 – Swift (Shin H., Park W.)
	3–7	57:54 – Testwuide (Park W.) (SH, ENG)

31 min
Penalties
6 min
25
Shots
48

13 April 2015; 20:30	Netherlands	0–1 (0–1, 0–0, 0–0)	Lithuania	IJssportcentrum, Eindhoven; Attendance: 1,500

Game reference
Ian Meierdres	Goalies	Mantas Armalis	Referee: (Denmark) Jacob Grumsen; Linesmen: (Belgium) Frederic Monnaie (Serbia) David Perduv
0–1 / 00:11 – Bosas (Gintautas, Bogdziul)			Referee: (Denmark) Jacob Grumsen; Linesmen: (Belgium) Frederic Monnaie (Serbia) David Perduv
20 min	Penalties	10 min	Referee: (Denmark) Jacob Grumsen; Linesmen: (Belgium) Frederic Monnaie (Serbia) David Perduv
35	Shots	26	Referee: (Denmark) Jacob Grumsen; Linesmen: (Belgium) Frederic Monnaie (Serbia) David Perduv

14 April 2015; 13:30	Estonia	1–2 (0–1, 1–0, 0–1)	Great Britain	IJssportcentrum, Eindhoven; Attendance: 500

Game reference

Roman Shumikhin
Goalies
Ben Bowns
Referee:
(Finland) Anssi Salonen
Linesmen:
(Netherlands) Louis Beelen
(Serbia) David Perduv

	0–1	15:36 – D. Phillips (Weaver, Cowley)
Rooba (Makrov) – 33:19	1–1
	1–2	54:10 – Farmer (Weaver, D. Phillips)

2 min
Penalties
6 min
30
Shots
32

14 April 2015; 17:00	Croatia	4–1 (0–1, 2–0, 2–0)	Lithuania	IJssportcentrum, Eindhoven; Attendance: 350

Game reference

Mark Dekanich
Goalies
Mantas Armalis
Referee:
(Canada) Jeff Ingram
Linesmen:
(Belgium) Frederic Monnaie
(Italy) Ulrich Pardatscher

	0–1	17:42 – Čižas (Nomanovas)
Perkovich (Letang) – 30:56	1–1
Sertich (Waugh, Dekanich) (PP2) – 33:34	2–1
Kinasewich (Sertich, Murray) (PP) – 46:26	3–1
Murray (Perkovich, Waugh) (ENG) – 59:26	4–1

20 min
Penalties
16 min
35
Shots
31

14 April 2015; 20:30	South Korea	7–1 (2–0, 3–1, 2–0)	Netherlands	IJssportcentrum, Eindhoven; Attendance: 920

Game reference

Park Sung-je
Goalies
Ian Meierdres
Martijn Oosterwijk
Referee:
(Austria) Shane Warschaw
Linesmen:
(Czech Republic) Marek Hlavatý
(Finland) Pasi Nieminen

Shin S. (Testwuide) – 04:03	1–0
Cho (Testwuide, Shin S.) – 15:30	2–0
Lee D. (Swift) (PP) – 22:13	3–0
Swift (Cho) (PP) – 31:01	4–0
Swift (Shin H.) (PP) – 34:30	5–0
	5–1	39:34 – K. Bruijsten (PP)
Lee D. (Kim S., Kim K.) – 48:32	6–1
Cho (Oh) (PP) – 51:17	7–1

20 min
Penalties
12 min
37
Shots
18

16 April 2015; 13:30	Lithuania	6–1 (2–0, 0–1, 4–0)	Estonia	IJssportcentrum, Eindhoven; Attendance: 300

Game reference

Mantas Armalis
Goalies
Roman Shumikhin
Referee:
(Austria) Shane Warschaw
Linesmen:
(Finland) Pasi Nieminen
(Japan) Sotaro Yamaguchi

Bendžius – 04:58	1–0
Pliskauskas (Ališauskas) (PP) – 19:02	2–0
	2–1	25:16 – Sibirtsev (Andrejev, Titarenko)
Bendžius – 43:30	3–1
Kieras (Bosas, Ališauskas) (PP) – 49:26	4–1
Nomanovas (Bogdziul) (ENG) – 53:29	5–1
Pliskauskas – 56:48	6–1

8 min
Penalties
6 min
30
Shots
26

16 April 2015; 17:00	South Korea	2–3 (1–0, 1–2, 0–1)	Great Britain	IJssportcentrum, Eindhoven; Attendance: 700

Game reference

Park Sung-je
Goalies
Ben Bowns
Referee:
(Denmark) Jacob Grumsen
Linesmen:
(Netherlands) Louis Beelen
(Czech Republic) Marek Hlavatý

Park W. (Lee D., Kim W.) – 19:38	1–0
Kim K. (Kim S., Radunske) – 20:35	2–0
	2–1	20:51 – Farmer
	2–2	33:35 – O'Connor (Weaver) (PP2)
	2–3	46:39 – O'Connor (PS)

14 min
Penalties
12 min
30
Shots
30

16 April 2015; 20:30	Croatia	2–5 (2–2, 0–1, 0–2)	Netherlands	IJssportcentrum, Eindhoven; Attendance: 1,350

Game reference

Mark Dekanich
Goalies
Martijn Oosterwijk
Referee:
(Finland) Anssi Salonen
Linesmen:
(Italy) Ulrich Pardatscher
(Serbia) David Perduv

Perkovich – 00:12	1–0
	1–1	12:28 – Demelinne (K. Bruijsten)
	1–2	15:06 – Bruijsten (Wurm, Tummers) (PP)
Murray (Kinasewich, Letang) – 19:22	2–2
	2–3	39:36 – Wurm (Hagemeijer, Van den Heuvel)
	2–4	42:24 – Brekelmans (De Jong, Van Lijden)
	2–5	59:58 – Hagemeijer (ENG)

18 min
Penalties
8 min
24
Shots
28

18 April 2015; 13:30	Lithuania	0–5 (0–0, 0–3, 0–2)	South Korea	IJssportcentrum, Eindhoven; Attendance: 1,500

Game reference

Mantas Armalis
Goalies
Park Sung-je
Referee:
(Finland) Anssi Salonen
Linesmen:
(Italy) Ulrich Pardatscher
(Serbia) David Perduv

0–1	29:28 – Ahn (Radunske, Kim K.)
0–2	35:49 – Cho (Shin H., Shin S.)
0–3	37:44 – Kim S. (Shin S.) (PP)
0–4	52:01 – Lee You. (Kim H.)
0–5	54:03 – Kim S. (Radunske) (PP)

12 min
Penalties
10 min
15
Shots
46

18 April 2015; 17:00	Croatia	5–2 (1–2, 2–0, 2–0)	Estonia	IJssportcentrum, Eindhoven

Game reference

Mark Dekanich
Goalies
Villem-Henrik Koitmaa
Referee:
(Denmark) Jacob Grumsen
Linesmen:
(Czech Republic) Marek Hlavatý
(Belgium) Frederic Monnaie

	0–1	06:23 – Makrov (Auksi)
	0–2	09:09 – Fedoruk
Kinasewich (Sertich) – 11:28	1–2
Perkovich (Blagus, Kegalj) – 23:52	2–2
Miličić (Sertich, Murray) – 39:08	3–2
Kinasewich (Murray) – 49:18	4–2
Murray (ENG) – 58:37	5–2

4 min
Penalties
4 min
32
Shots
28

18 April 2015; 20:30	Great Britain	3–2 (3–1, 0–0, 0–1)	Netherlands	IJssportcentrum, Eindhoven; Attendance: 2,500

Game reference

Ben Bowns
Goalies
Martijn Oosterwijk
Ian Meierdres
Referee:
(Canada) Jeff Ingram
Linesmen:
(Finland) Pasi Nieminen
(Japan) Sotaro Yamaguchi

	0–1	03:09 – Mason (Hagemeijer, Van Oorschot)
Swindlehurst (O'Connor, Shields) – 04:01	1–1
Blight (Peacock) – 09:24	2–1
Peacock – 12:13	3–1
	3–2	53:38 – Houkes (Van Lijden, Tummers)

8 min
Penalties
2 min
30
Shots
17

19 April 2015; 13:30	South Korea	9–4 (1–1, 5–2, 3–1)	Croatia	IJssportcentrum, Eindhoven; Attendance: 1,500

Game reference

Park Sung-je
Goalies
Mark Dekanich
Mate Tomljenović
Referee:
(Canada) Jeff Ingram
Linesmen:
(Czech Republic) Marek Hlavatý
(Finland) Pasi Nieminen

Swift (Testwuide) – 04:39	1–0
	1–1	09:39 – Blagus (Perkovich, Glumac)
	1–2	22:58 – Kinasewich (Miličić, Murray) (PP)
Ahn (Kim W., Kim S.) (PP) – 24:43	2–2
Kim K. (Kim S., Radunske) – 25:45	3–2
Kim W. (Swift) – 26:14	4–2
Kim K. (Kim S.) – 28:17	5–2
	5–3	30:10 – Brencun (Murray) (SH)
Testwuide (Swift, Park W.) – 37:34	6–3
Kim W. (Kim K., Radunske) (PP) – 48:49	7–3
	7–4	53:52 – Jačmenjak (Kinasewich, Martinović) (PP)
Testwuide (Swift) – 54:13	8–4
Kim S. (Radunske) – 55:27	9–4

18 min
Penalties
80 min
39
Shots
20

19 April 2015; 17:00	Lithuania	3–2 (0–1, 2–0, 1–1)	Great Britain	IJssportcentrum, Eindhoven; Attendance: 1,800

Game reference

Mantas Armalis
Goalies
Ben Bowns
Referee:
(Finland) Anssi Salonen
Linesmen:
(Netherlands) Louis Beelen
(Japan) Sotaro Yamaguchi

	0–1	14:08 – Garside (Thomas, Lachowicz)
Nomanovas (Rybakov, Visockas) – 29:55	1–1
Ališauskas (Kumeliauskas) – 37:45	2–1
	2–2	43:25 – Cowley (Weaver, Prince)
Gintautas (Kieras, Ališauskas) (PP) – 53:01	3–2

33 min
Penalties
14 min
15
Shots
37

19 April 2015; 20:30	Netherlands	1–3 (0–2, 1–0, 0–1)	Estonia	IJssportcentrum, Eindhoven; Attendance: 1,500

Game reference

Ian Meierdres
Goalies
Roman Shumikhin
Referee:
(Austria) Shane Warschaw
Linesmen:
(Belgium) Frederic Monnaie
(Italy) Ulrich Pardatscher

	0–1	17:27 – Makrov (Lahesalu, Rooba) (PP2)
	0–2	18:49 – Makrov (Sibirtsev, Urushev) (PP)
Tummers (Van de Velden, Hagemeijer) – 28:55	1–2
	1–3	59:08 – Makrov

22 min
Penalties
4 min
22
Shots
31

=== Awards and statistics ===
==== Awards ====
- Best players selected by the directorate:
  - Best Goalkeeper: (Lithuania) Mantas Armalis
  - Best Defenseman: (United Kingdom) Ben O'Connor
  - Best Forward: (South Korea) Lee Yong-jun

Source: IIHF.com

==== Scoring leaders ====
List shows the top skaters sorted by points, then goals.

Player	GP	G	A	Pts	+/−	PIM	POS
(South Korea) Michael Swift	5	5	4	9	+8	14	F
(Estonia) Andrei Makrov	5	6	2	8	−3	2	F
(South Korea) Kim Ki-sung	5	4	4	8	+5	4	F
(South Korea) Mike Testwuide	5	4	4	8	+9	0	F
(South Korea) Kim Sang-wook	5	3	5	8	+4	6	F
(Croatia) Andrew Murray	5	3	5	8	+1	4	F
(South Korea) Brock Radunske	5	0	7	7	+4	0	F
(Croatia) Ryan Kinasewich	5	4	2	6	−2	0	F
(Croatia) Nathan Perkovich	5	4	2	6	+2	18	F
(South Korea) Cho Min-ho	5	3	2	5	+2	2	F
(United Kingdom) Ben O'Connor	5	3	2	5	+1	6	D

GP = Games played; G = Goals; A = Assists; Pts = Points; +/− = Plus/minus; PIM = Penalties in minutes; POS = Position
Source: IIHF.com

==== Goaltending leaders ====
Only the top five goaltenders, based on save percentage, who have played at least 40% of their team's minutes, are included in this list.

Player	TOI	GA	GAA	SA	Sv%	SO
(Lithuania) Mantas Armalis	298:59	11	2.21	178	93.82	1
(Netherlands) Ian Meierdres	204:21	8	2.35	98	91.84	0
(United Kingdom) Ben Bowns	299:04	10	2.01	122	91.80	0
(Croatia) Mark Dekanich	259:51	11	2.54	128	91.41	0
(South Korea) Park Sung-je	238:51	8	2.01	83	90.36	1

TOI = Time on Ice (minutes:seconds); SA = Shots against; GA = Goals against; GAA = Goals against average; Sv% = Save percentage; SO = Shutouts
Source: IIHF.com
