= Sarauer =

Sarauer is a surname. Notable people with the surname include:

- Andrew Sarauer (born 1984), Canadian-Hungarian ice hockey player
- Nicole Sarauer (born 1986–87), Canadian politician
