= Frank Banham =

Canadian-born Hungarian ice hockey player

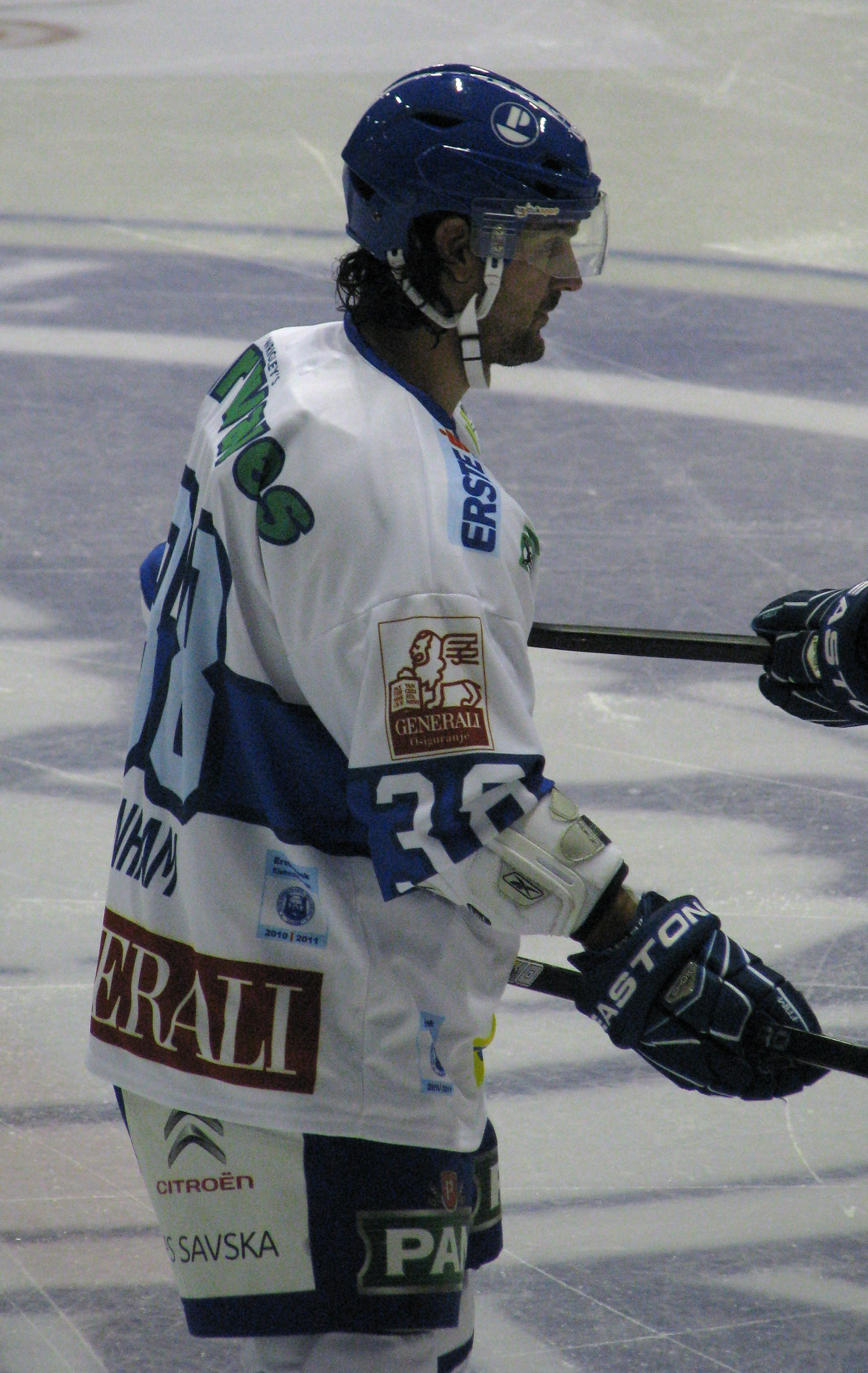
- Born: April 14, 1975 (age 51) Calahoo, Alberta, Canada
- Height: 6 ft 0 in (183 cm)
- Weight: 198 lb (90 kg; 14 st 2 lb)
- Position: Right wing
- Shot: Right
- Played for: Mighty Ducks of Anaheim; Espoo Blues; Jokerit; Phoenix Coyotes; HC Dynamo Moscow; SaiPa; HC Fribourg-Gottéron; EC Red Bull Salzburg; Malmö Redhawks; HDD Olimpija Ljubljana; EHC Biel; KHL Medveščak Zagreb; Alba Volán Székesfehérvár
- National team: Canada and Hungary
- NHL draft: 147th overall, 1993; Washington Capitals
- Playing career: 1995–2016

Frank Banham (born April 14, 1975) is a Canadian-born Hungarian former professional ice hockey winger who last played for Hungarian club, SAPA Fehérvár AV19 in the Austrian Hockey League (EBEL).

== Playing career ==
Initially drafted 147th overall by the Washington Capitals in the 1993 NHL entry draft, Banham played 27 regular season games in the NHL for the Mighty Ducks of Anaheim scoring 9 goals and 2 assists for 11 points and 5 games for the Phoenix Coyotes, scoring no points and collecting 2 penalty minutes. He spent much of his time in the respective AHL affiliates, the Cincinnati Mighty Ducks and the Springfield Falcons. He has also played in Finland, Russia, Switzerland, Austria and Sweden.

After a successful first season with Alba Volan, Banham opted to sign a two-year contract extension to remain with the Hungarian club, on July 9, 2013.

== Career statistics ==
=== Regular season and playoffs ===
			Regular season					Playoffs
Season	Team	League	GP	G	A	Pts	PIM	GP	G	A	Pts	PIM
1989–90	St. Albert Sabres Bantam AAA	CABHL	30	18	13	31	26	—	—	—	—	—
1990–91	Spruce Grove Broncos Bantam AAA	AMBHL	32	23	34	57	105	—	—	—	—	—
1991–92	Fernie Ghostriders	RMJHL	47	45	45	90	120	—	—	—	—	—
1992–93	Saskatoon Blades	WHL	71	29	33	62	55	9	2	7	9	8
1993–94	Saskatoon Blades	WHL	65	28	39	67	99	16	8	11	19	36
1994–95	Saskatoon Blades	WHL	70	50	39	89	63	8	2	6	8	12
1995–96	Saskatoon Blades	WHL	72	83	69	152	116	4	6	0	6	2
1995–96	Baltimore Bandits	AHL	9	1	4	5	0	7	1	1	2	2
1996–97	Baltimore Bandits	AHL	21	11	13	24	4	—	—	—	—	—
1996–97	Mighty Ducks of Anaheim	NHL	3	0	0	0	0	—	—	—	—	—
1997–98	Mighty Ducks of Anaheim	NHL	21	9	2	11	12	—	—	—	—	—
1997–98	Cincinnati Mighty Ducks	AHL	35	7	8	15	39	—	—	—	—	—
1998–99	Cincinnati Mighty Ducks	AHL	66	22	27	49	20	3	0	1	1	0
1999–00	Cincinnati Mighty Ducks	AHL	72	19	22	41	58	—	—	—	—	—
1999–00	Mighty Ducks of Anaheim	NHL	3	0	0	0	2	—	—	—	—	—
2000–01	Blues	SM-l	56	24	27	51	70	—	—	—	—	—
2001–02	Jokerit	SM-l	52	22	16	38	38	12	8	1	9	22
2002–03	Jokerit	SM-l	17	3	4	7	12	—	—	—	—	—
2002–03	Springfield Falcons	AHL	62	23	17	40	36	6	2	1	3	2
2002–03	Phoenix Coyotes	NHL	5	0	0	0	2	—	—	—	—	—
2003–04	Springfield Falcons	AHL	39	6	8	14	18	—	—	—	—	—
2003–04	Dynamo Moscow	RSL	6	1	1	2	8	—	—	—	—	—
2004–05	SaiPa	SM-l	56	24	25	49	70	—	—	—	—	—
2005–06	HC Fribourg-Gottéron	NLA	6	1	0	1	8	—	—	—	—	—
2005–06	EC Red Bull Salzburg	EBEL	45	24	25	49	40	11	5	7	12	10
2006–07	EC Red Bull Salzburg	EBEL	40	20	15	35	50	8	9	12	21	12
2007–08	EC Red Bull Salzburg	EBEL	31	10	14	24	22	—	—	—	—	—
2007–08	Malmö Redhawks	SWE-1	8	4	3	7	6	10	3	6	9	8
2008–09	HDD Olimpija Ljubljana	EBEL	52	30	29	59	100	—	—	—	—	—
2008–09	Biel	NLA	6	2	3	5	0	—	—	—	—	—
2009–10	HDD Olimpija Ljubljana	EBEL	42	30	32	62	34	—	—	—	—	—
2009–10	Lausanne	NLB	5	2	3	5	0	11	3	6	9	2
2010–11	KHL Medveščak	EBEL	51	19	28	47	46	5	2	4	6	8
2011–12	KHL Medveščak	EBEL	47	19	23	42	34	5	1	6	7	29
2012–13	Alba Volán Székesfehérvár	EBEL	51	19	19	38	24	—	—	—	—	—
2013–14	Alba Volán Székesfehérvár	EBEL	54	20	31	51	34	4	0	0	0	0
2014–15	Alba Volán Székesfehérvár	EBEL	48	19	27	46	18	6	2	4	6	6
2015–16	Alba Volán Székesfehérvár	EBEL	26	8	10	18	22	—	—	—	—	—
EBEL totals			487	218	253	471	424	39	19	33	52	65
NHL totals			32	9	2	11	16	—	—	—	—	—

=== International ===
Year	Team	Event	Result	GP	G	A	Pts	PIM
2001	Canada	SC	2nd place, silver medalist(s)	5	4	0	4	2
2015	Hungary	WC D1A	12th	5	1	4	5	2
2016	Hungary	OGQ	DNQ	3	2	0	2	2
2016	Hungary	WC	15th	4	1	0	1	2
Senior totals				17	8	4	12	8

== Awards and trophies ==
- SM-liiga champion (with Jokerit) – 2001–02
- Erste Bank Eishockey Liga champion (with Red Bull Salzburg) (2) – 2006–07, 2007–08
- WHL East First All-Star Team – 1996
- Number 39 retired by the Saskatoon Blades
