= Andrew Sarauer =

Canadian-Hungarian ice hockey player (born 1984)

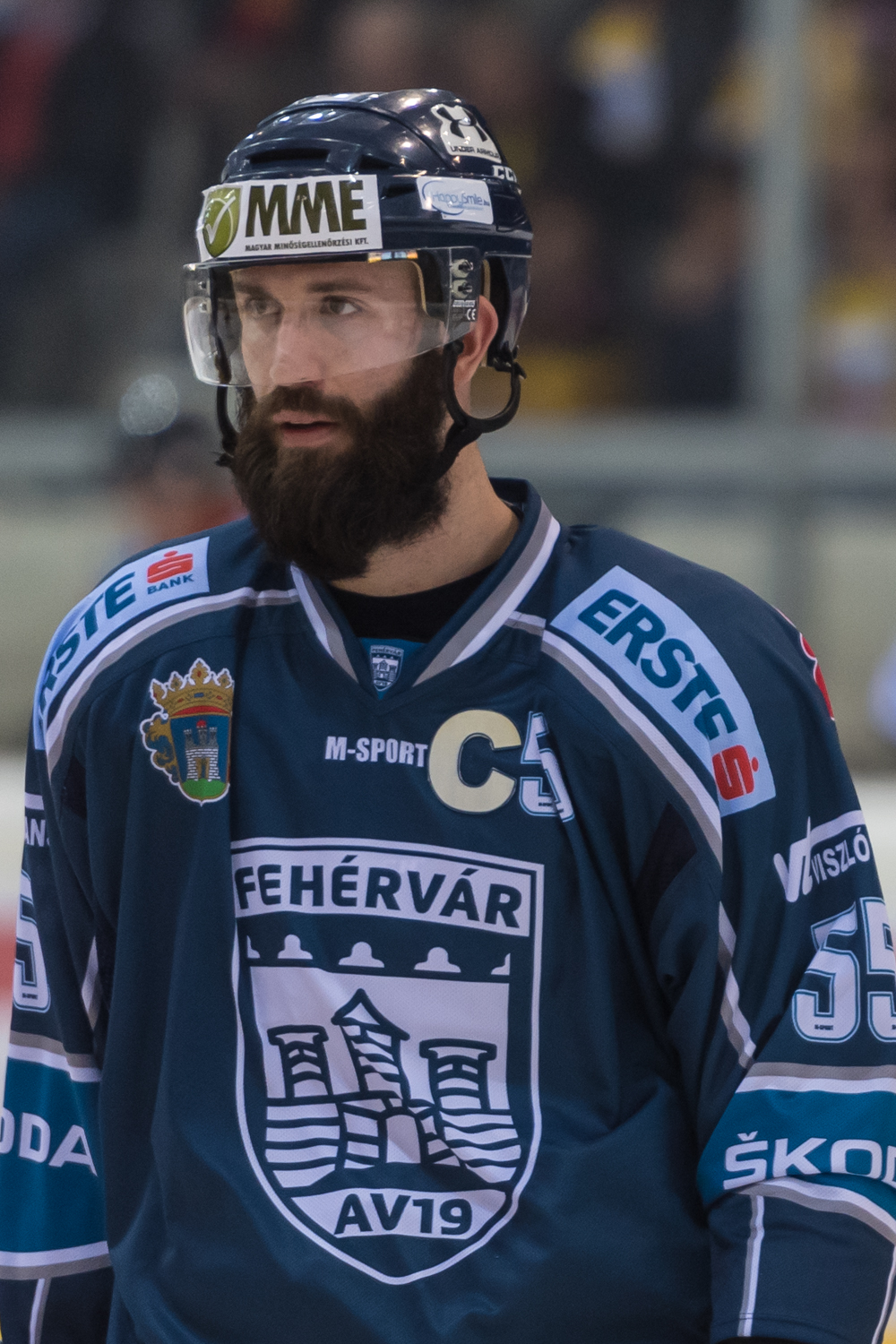
- Born: November 17, 1984 (age 41) Outlook, Saskatchewan, Canada
- Height: 6 ft 4 in (193 cm)
- Weight: 205 lb (93 kg; 14 st 9 lb)
- Position: Left Wing
- Shot: Left
- ICEHL team Former teams: Fehérvár AV19; Lake Erie Monsters; Norfolk Admirals; Rockford IceHogs; Hershey Bears; Frederikshavn White Hawks; EC VSV
- National team: Hungary
- NHL draft: 125th overall, 2004; Vancouver Canucks
- Playing career: 2008–2023

Andrew Sarauer (born November 17, 1984) Canadian-Hungarian professional ice hockey winger (ice hockey Center) currently playing for Fehérvár AV19 of the ICE Hockey League (ICEHL). He has previously played in the American Hockey League (AHL) for the Lake Erie Monsters, Norfolk Admirals, Rockford IceHogs and Hershey Bears, as well as the ECHL for the Johnstown Chiefs, Reading Royals and Las Vegas Wranglers.

== Playing career ==
He was selected 125th overall in the 2004 NHL entry draft by the Vancouver Canucks after having played two seasons of Junior A in the British Columbia Hockey League (BCHL). Prior to turning professional, he played four years of college hockey with Northern Michigan University.

On June 22, 2011, Sarauer signed his first European contract with Danish team, Frederikshavn White Hawks of the AL-Bank Ligaen, on a one-year deal. Sarauer scored at a point per game pace for the White Hawks before returning to North American at season's end, signing a one-year deal with the Las Vegas Wranglers of the ECHL on September 12, 2012.

In the 2012–13 season for the Wranglers, Sarauer continued his offensive prowess in the ECHL, scoring 21 goals and 62 points on the top line in 70 games. On May 30, 2013, Sarauer opted for another contract abroad agreeing to a one-year contract with Hungarian club, SAPA Fehérvár AV19 of the EBEL.

Sarauer spent four seasons with Volan, gaining Hungarian citizenship and used as a focal point offensively. As a free agent following the 2016–17 season, Sarauer opted to move to Austrian outfit, EC VSV, on a one-year deal on May 11, 2017. Following the conclusion of his contract with Villach, Sarauer returned to Alba Volán Székesfehérvár.

== Career statistics ==
=== Regular season and playoffs ===
			Regular season					Playoffs
Season	Team	League	GP	G	A	Pts	PIM	GP	G	A	Pts	PIM
2001–02	Prince Albert Mintos AAA	SMHL	44	25	39	64	38	—	—	—	—	—
2002–03	Victoria Salsa	BCHL	57	11	17	28	73	—	—	—	—	—
2003–04	Langley Hornets	BCHL	57	43	32	75	71	—	—	—	—	—
2004–05	Northern Michigan University	CCHA	25	3	4	7	10	—	—	—	—	—
2005–06	Northern Michigan University	CCHA	17	2	3	5	8	—	—	—	—	—
2006–07	Northern Michigan University	CCHA	30	5	5	10	10	—	—	—	—	—
2007–08	Northern Michigan University	CCHA	40	3	6	9	16	—	—	—	—	—
2008–09	Johnstown Chiefs	ECHL	49	19	27	46	71	—	—	—	—	—
2008–09	Lake Erie Monsters	AHL	15	1	1	2	8	—	—	—	—	—
2008–09	Norfolk Admirals	AHL	3	0	0	0	2	—	—	—	—	—
2009–10	Reading Royals	ECHL	71	28	35	63	65	16	3	3	6	24
2010–11	Reading Royals	ECHL	60	25	42	67	40	8	3	4	7	2
2010–11	Rockford IceHogs	AHL	1	0	0	0	0	—	—	—	—	—
2010–11	Hershey Bears	AHL	1	0	0	0	0	—	—	—	—	—
2011–12	Frederikshavn White Hawks	DNK	22	7	15	22	32	4	1	1	2	2
2012–13	Las Vegas Wranglers	ECHL	70	21	41	62	66	7	4	6	10	4
2013–14	SAPA Fehérvár AV19	EBEL	54	19	30	49	52	4	3	0	3	4
2014–15	Fehérvár AV19	EBEL	54	21	38	59	55	6	1	4	5	6
2015–16	Fehérvár AV19	EBEL	34	6	13	19	25	—	—	—	—	—
2016–17	Fehérvár AV19	EBEL	54	18	25	43	44	—	—	—	—	—
2017–18	EC VSV	EBEL	52	11	31	42	38	—	—	—	—	—
2018–19	Fehérvár AV19	EBEL	41	18	24	42	46	6	1	3	4	4
2019–20	Fehérvár AV19	EBEL	50	16	23	39	22	—	—	—	—	—
2020–21	Fehérvár AV19	ICEHL	23	4	12	16	22	4	0	0	0	4
2021–22	Fehérvár AV19	ICEHL	47	13	16	29	14	10	1	2	3	8
ECHL totals			250	93	145	238	242	31	10	13	23	30
AHL totals			20	1	1	2	10	—	—	—	—	—
ICEHL totals			409	126	212	338	318	30	6	9	15	22

=== International ===
Year	Team	Event	Result	GP	G	A	Pts	PIM
2015	Hungary	WC D1A	12th	5	2	4	6	2
2016	Hungary	OGQ	DNQ	3	1	4	5	0
2016	Hungary	WC	15th	7	0	3	3	2
2017	Hungary	WC D1A	21st	5	1	1	2	4
2018	Hungary	WC D1A	20th	5	1	1	2	2
2019	Hungary	WC D1A	21st	5	0	0	0	4
2020	Hungary	OGQ	DNQ	3	1	0	1	0
Senior totals				33	6	13	19	14
