= Stephen Lee (ice hockey) =

British ice hockey player

- Born: 1 October 1990 (age 34); Kingston upon Hull, England
- Height: 1.83 m (6 ft 0 in)
- Weight: 90 kg (198 lb; 14 st 2 lb)
- Position: Defence
- Shoots: Right
- EIHL team Former teams: Nottingham Panthers; Hull Stingrays; Kingston Jets; Guildford Flames; HC Pustertal Wölfe
- National team: Great Britain
- NHL draft: Undrafted
- Playing career: 2004–present

Stephen Lee (born 1 October 1990) is a British ice hockey player formerly playing for Elite Ice Hockey League (EIHL) side Nottingham Panthers and the British national team, who he represented at the 2019 IIHF World Championship.

Lee previously played for Nottingham for a decade before returning to fellow EIHL side Guildford Flames in 2019.

He initially agreed to stay in Guildford for a second season in 2020, but due to ongoing coronavirus-induced uncertainty about when or if the 2020-21 Elite League season will start, Lee instead moved to the Alps Hockey League to sign for HC Pustertal Wölfe on August 30, 2020.

In May 2021, it was confirmed Lee would return to Nottingham after two years away from the club. Sadly, his season was cut short by injury early on, and it was announced on 4 August 2022 that he wouldn't be returning to the Panthers.

== Career statistics ==
=== Regular season and playoffs ===
As of July 2022

			Regular season					Playoffs
Season	Team	League	GP	G	A	Pts	PIM	GP	G	A	Pts	PIM
2004-05	Hull Stingrays	BNL	1	0	0	0	0	-	-	-	-	-
2004-05	Kingston Jets	ENL	13	2	3	5	8	-	-	-	-	-
2005-06	Hull Stingrays	EPIHL	44	1	3	4	14	-	-	-	-	-
2005-06	Kingston Jets	ENL	2	1	0	1	0	-	-	-	-	-
2006-07	Hull Stingrays	EIHL	45	1	1	2	4	-	-	-	-	-
2007-08	Hull Stingrays	EIHL	49	0	3	3	20	-	-	-	-	-
2008-09	Guildford Flames	EPIHL	50	11	10	21	57	-	-	-	-	-
2009-10	Nottingham Panthers	EIHL	52	3	5	8	84	3	0	0	0	4
2010-11	Nottingham Panthers	EIHL	49	3	19	22	88	4	0	0	0	0
2011-12	Nottingham Panthers	EIHL	50	5	14	19	100	4	0	1	1	0
2012-13	Nottingham Panthers	EIHL	43	2	9	11	29	4	0	1	1	0
2013-14	Nottingham Panthers	EIHL	33	1	13	14	49	2	0	0	0	0
2014-15	Nottingham Panthers A	EIHL	31	2	8	10	27	2	0	0	0	2
2015-16	Nottingham Panthers A	EIHL	47	4	15	19	32	4	0	0	0	2
2016-17	Nottingham Panthers A	EIHL	47	3	15	18	41	2	0	0	0	4
2017-18	Nottingham Panthers C	EIHL	54	1	13	14	65	4	0	2	2	6
2018-19	Nottingham Panthers A	EIHL	59	1	11	12	32	-	-	-	-	-
2019-20	Guildford Flames	EIHL	40	0	14	14	13	-	-	-	-	-
2020-21	HC Pustertal Wölfe	AlpsHL	24	0	11	11	16	-	-	-	-	-
2020-21	HC Pustertal Wölfe	Serie A	3	1	1	2	0	-	-	-	-	-
2021-22	Nottingham Panthers C	EIHL	3	1	1	2	0	-	-	-	-	-
