= Stefano Marchetti (ice hockey) =

Italian ice hockey player (born 1986)

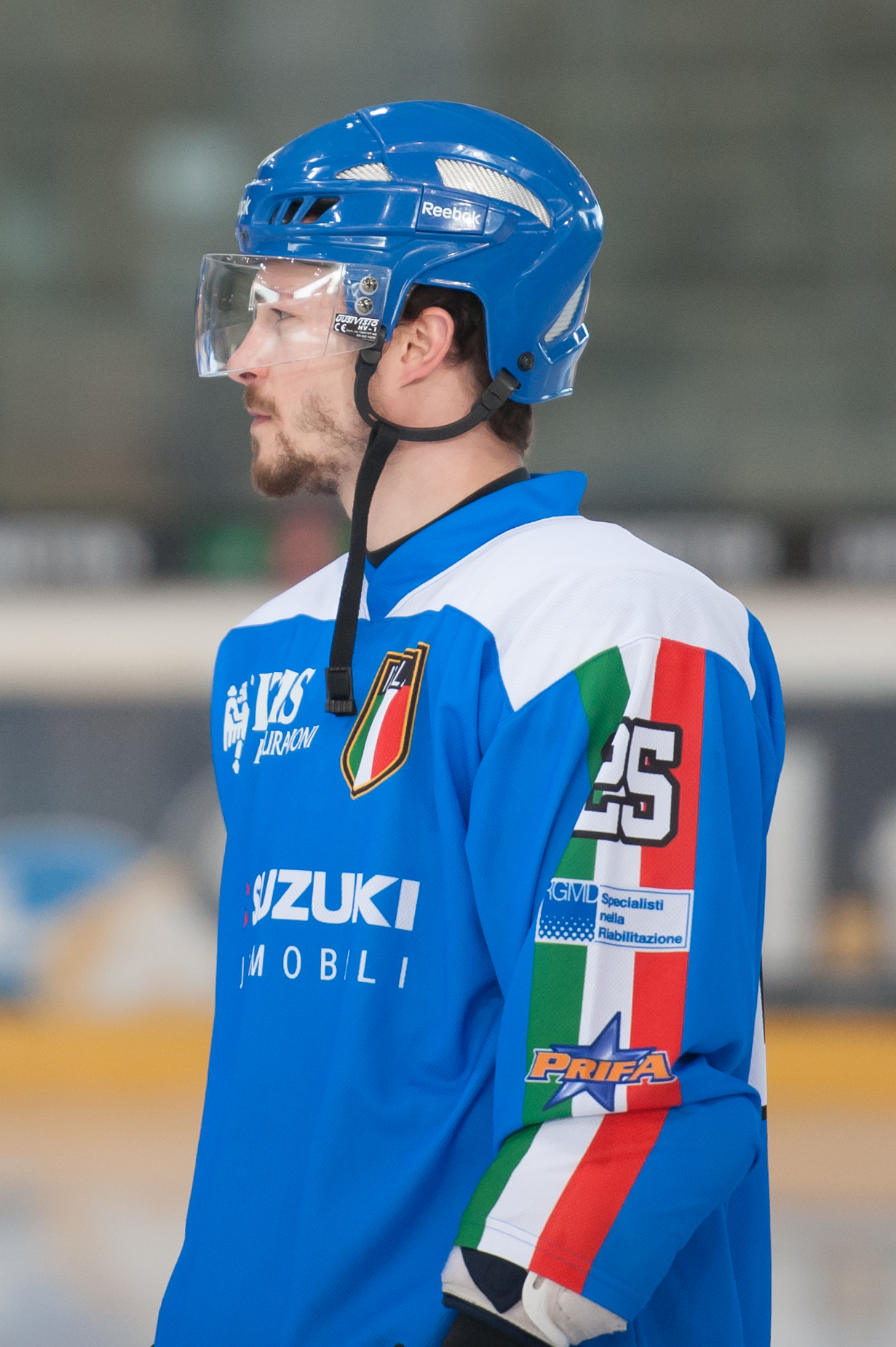
- Born: November 10, 1986 (age 38); Trento, Italy
- Height: 5 ft 11 in (180 cm)
- Weight: 163 lb (74 kg; 11 st 9 lb)
- Position: Defence
- Shoots: Left
- National team: Italy
- Playing career: 2002–present

Stefano Marchetti is an Italian professional ice hockey defenceman who participated at the 2010 IIHF World Championship as a member of the Italian National men's ice hockey team.
