= Anton Bernard =

Italian professional ice hockey Winger

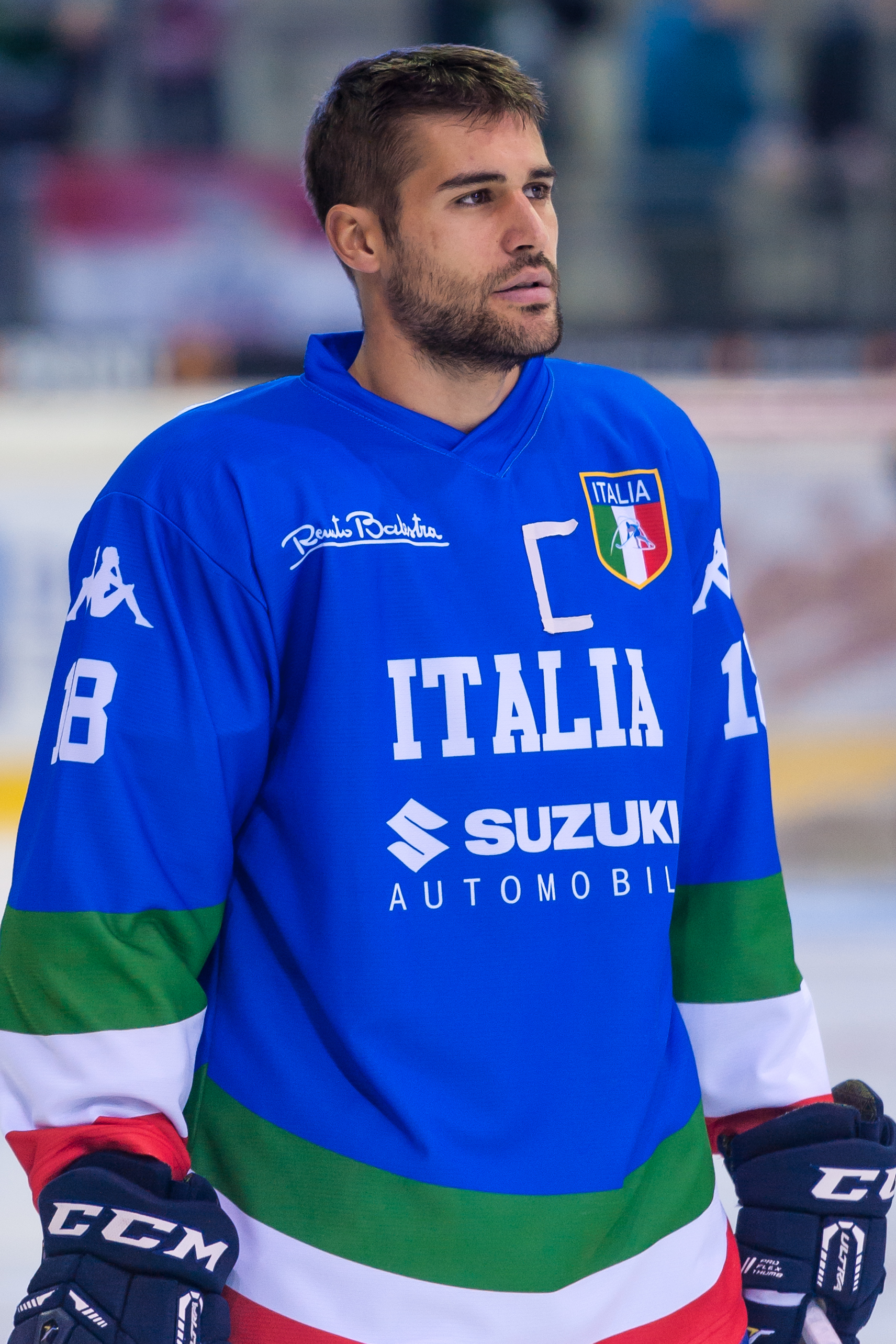
- Anton Bernard playing for Italy in 2016
- Born: April 18, 1989 (age 36) Bolzano, Italy
- Height: 5 ft 10 in (178 cm)
- Weight: 181 lb (82 kg; 12 st 13 lb)
- Position: Forward
- Shot: Right
- Played for: Starbulls Rosenheim; HC Bolzano
- National team: Italy
- NHL draft: Undrafted
- Playing career: 2005–2022

Anton Bernard (born April 18, 1989) is an Italian former professional ice hockey Winger who most notably played for HC Bolzano of the ICE Hockey League (ICEHL). Bernard competed in the 2012 IIHF World Championship as a member of the Italy men's national ice hockey team.
