= Andreas Bernard =

Italian ice hockey player

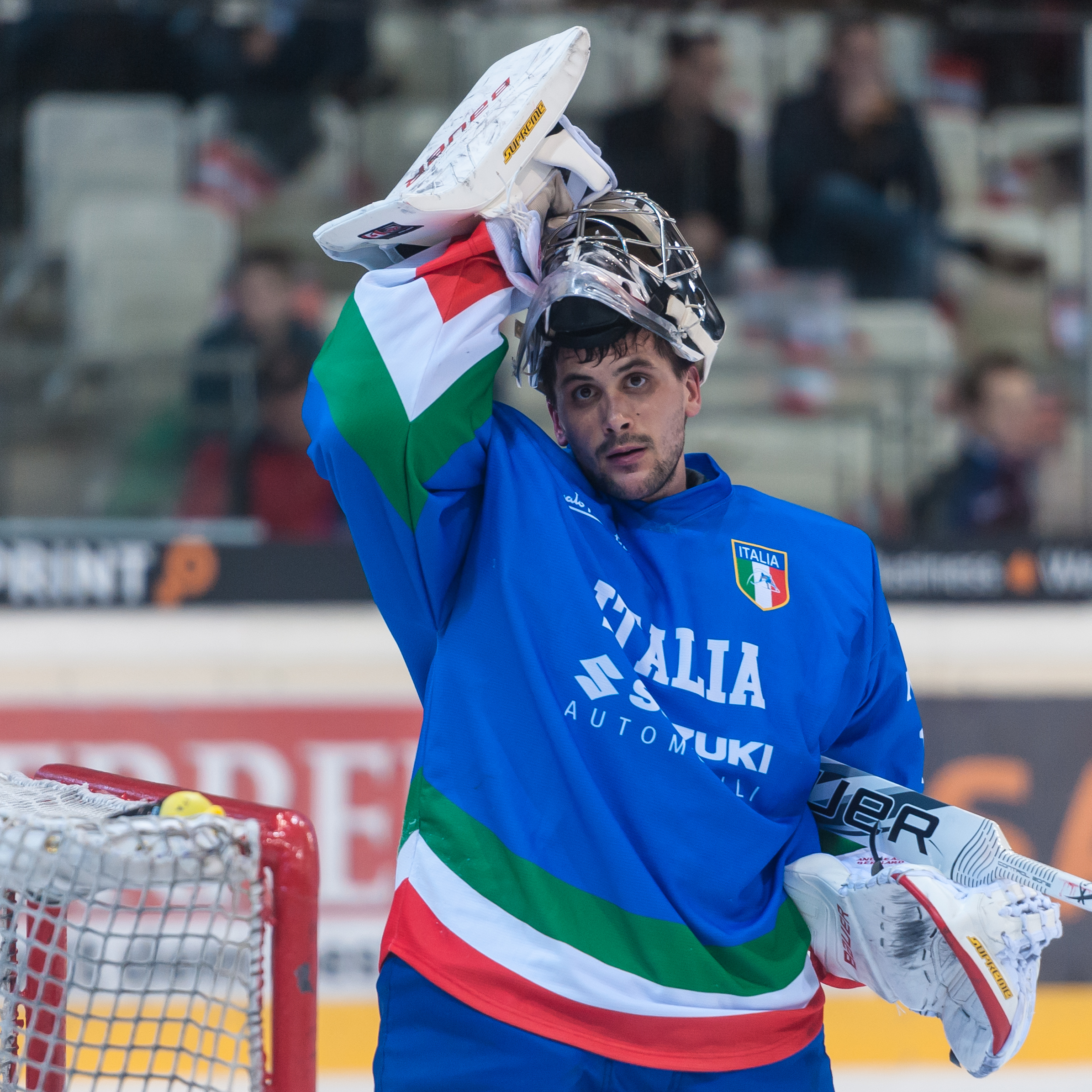
- Andreas Bernard with the Italian national team
- Born: 9 June 1990 (age 36) Neumarkt, Italy
- Height: 6 ft 0 in (183 cm)
- Weight: 200 lb (91 kg; 14 st 4 lb)
- Position: Goaltender
- Catches: Left
- ICEHL team Former teams: HC Pustertal; SaiPa; HC Ässät; MAC Újbuda; Väsby IK; EC VSV; HC Bolzano
- National team: Italy
- Playing career: 2008–present

Andreas Bernard (born 9 June 1990) is an Italian professional ice hockey goaltender who currently plays for HC Pustertal Wölfe of the ICE Hockey League (ICEHL).

In the ranks of SaiPa and HC Ässät, "Andy" played in Finland for 10 seasons and he holds the record for most games played as a foreign goaltender in the Liiga, the highest level league in Finland, with 216 regular season games played. Bernard speaks fluent Finnish. He is a one-time Italian champion.

He has played with the Italian national team in 10 IIHF World Championships.

== Career ==
=== HC Ässät Pori (2015–2019) ===
For the 2015–2016 season, Bernard moved to HC Ässät Pori on a one-year contract. In late October 2015, the club signed a one-year extension with Bernard. During the season, he became the HC Ässät's first-choice goaltender due to Ari Ahonen's injury and played 43 games in the regular season, saving four shutouts. In the 2016–2017 season, Bernard continued as HC Ässät's starting goalie and made another four shutouts in the regular season. In December 2016, Bernard signed a two-year extension with the team.

In the 2017–2018 regular season, Bernard won the most games (21) in the regular season alongside Jussi Olkinuora of JYP Jyväskylä. In the 2018–2019 season, on 16 October 2018, against Helsingfors IFK, he played his 190th regular season game of his league career, which tied Scott Langkow's record for the most regular season games played by a foreign goalie in the Finnish Liiga. In February 2019, on the eve of the transfer deadline, he moved to Adler Mannheim of the German DEL on a contract covering the rest of the season, when the Ässät were last in the league table. However, Bernard did not receive any playing time for the team. In the playoffs, he was no longer part of Adler's lineup and was left as the third goalkeeper to Dennis Endras and Chet Pickard. Bernard was therefore not officially part of the team that won the German championship at the end of the season.
