= Paul Swindlehurst =

British ice hockey player

- Born: 25 May 1993 (age 32) Manchester, England
- Height: 1.93 m (6 ft 4 in)
- Weight: 94 kg (207 lb; 14 st 11 lb)
- Position: Defence
- Shot: Left
- Played for: Swindon Wildcats; Dundee Stars; Nottingham Panthers; Manchester Storm; Sydney Ice Dogs; Belfast Giants; TH Unia Oświęcim; Coventry Blaze
- National team: Great Britain
- NHL draft: Undrafted
- Playing career: 2011–2021

Paul Swindlehurst (born 25 May 1993) is a retired British ice hockey player who last played for Elite Ice Hockey League side Coventry Blaze and the British national team.

He represented Great Britain at the 2019 IIHF World Championship and 2021 IIHF World Championship.

Swindlehurst retired from hockey in 2021 in order to pursue a career with the Greater Manchester Police.
