= Miklós Rajna =

Hungarian ice hockey player (born 1991)

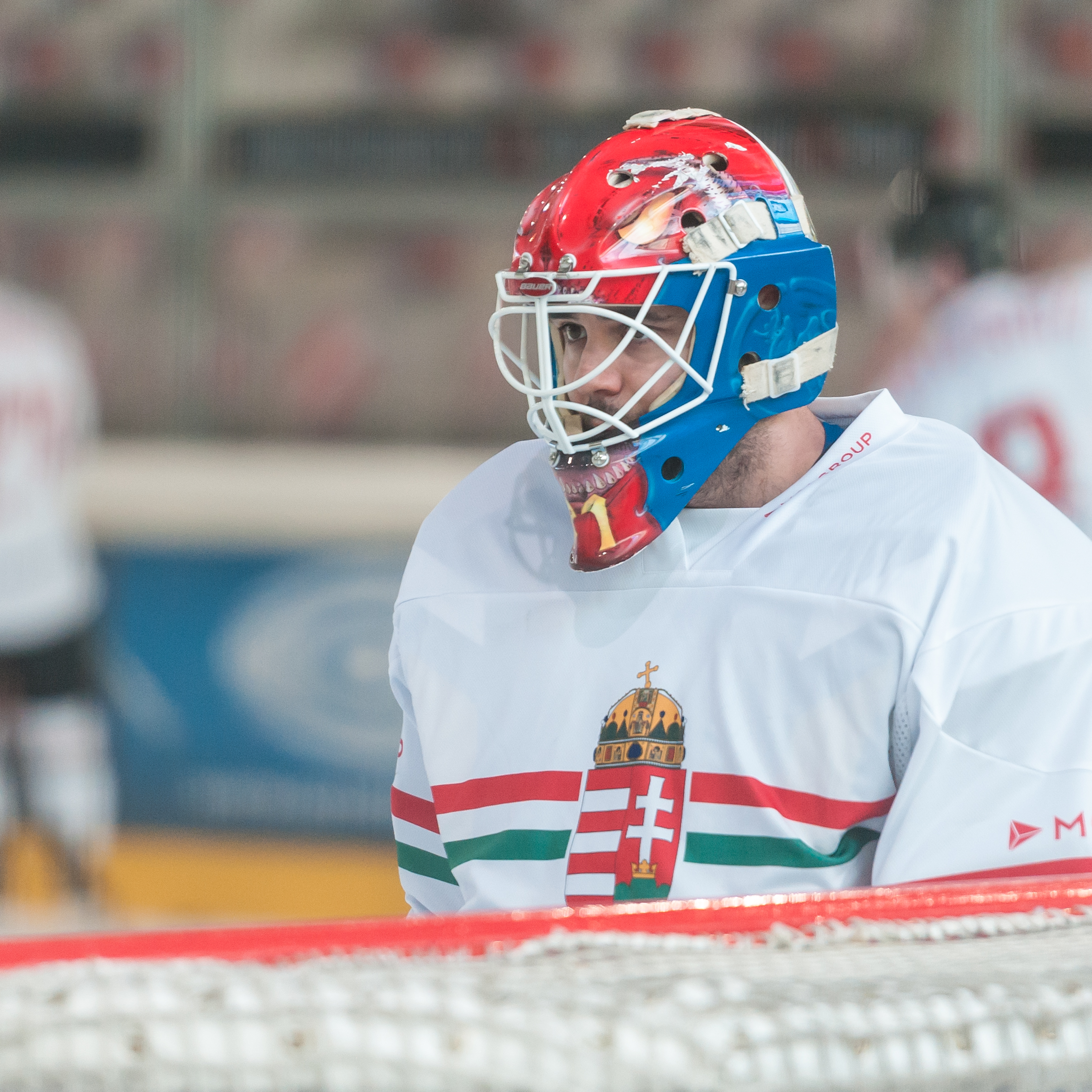
- Born: 22 June 1991 (age 33); Dunaújváros, Hungary
- Height: 5 ft 11 in (180 cm)
- Weight: 187 lb (85 kg; 13 st 5 lb)
- Position: Goaltender
- Catches: Left
- EIHL team Former teams: Coventry Blaze; Dunaújvárosi Acélbikák; Budapest Stars; Fehérvár AV19; MAC Budapest; DVTK Jegesmedvék; UTE
- National team: Hungary
- Playing career: 2008–present

Miklós Rajna (Hungarian pronunciation: [ˈmikloːʃ ˈrɒjnɒ]; born 22 June 1991 in Dunaújváros) is a Hungarian professional ice hockey goaltender who last played for Coventry Blaze in the UK's Elite Ice Hockey League (EIHL).

== Playing career ==
Producing a 94.8 percent saving percentage, Rajna played a key role in Alba Volán's triumph in the 2012–13 Erste Bank Young Stars League (the Austrian youth league), subsequently he was promoted to the senior team in the summer of 2013.

In the same year he was selected for the Hungarian national team that played at the 2013 IIHF World Championship Division I.
