= Ben O'Connor (ice hockey) =

British ice hockey player (born 1988)

- Born: 21 December 1988 (age 37) Durham, England
- Height: 1.85 m (6 ft 1 in)
- Weight: 85 kg (187 lb; 13 st 5 lb)
- Position: Defence
- Shoots: Left
- NIHL team Former teams: Swindon Wildcats; Basingstoke Bison; Edinburgh Capitals; Coventry Blaze; Pingouins de Morzine-Avoriaz; Saryarka Karagandy; Arlan Kokshetau; Leksands IF; Sheffield Steelers; Sheffield Steeldogs; Cardiff Devils; HSC Csíkszereda; Guildford Flames; Dundee Stars
- National team: Great Britain
- NHL draft: Undrafted
- Playing career: 2007–present

Ben O'Connor (born 21 December 1988) is a British ice hockey player who currently plays for National Ice Hockey League (NIHL) side Swindon Wildcats.

O'Connor most recently played for Guildford Flames and he also plays for the British national team.

== Playing career ==
He represented Great Britain at the 2019 IIHF World Championship, 2021 IIHF World Championship, 2022 IIHF World Championship and 2024 IIHF World Championship.

After leaving the Sheffield Steelers in 2020, O'Connor moved to NIHL side Sheffield Steeldogs. The move came after the 2020-21 Elite League season was suspended indefinitely due to ongoing coronavirus restrictions.

In August 2021, O'Connor signed terms with EIHL side Cardiff Devils. He departed Cardiff in December 2021. He later joined Romanian side HSC Csíkszereda.

In July 2022, O'Connor returned to the EIHL to sign for Guildford Flames.

After two seasons with Guildford, O'Connor signed a two-year deal with the Dundee Stars.

In April 2025, O'Connor left Dundee after only one season to join drop down a level and join NIHL side Swindon Wildcats.
