= Joachim Ramoser =

Italian ice hockey player

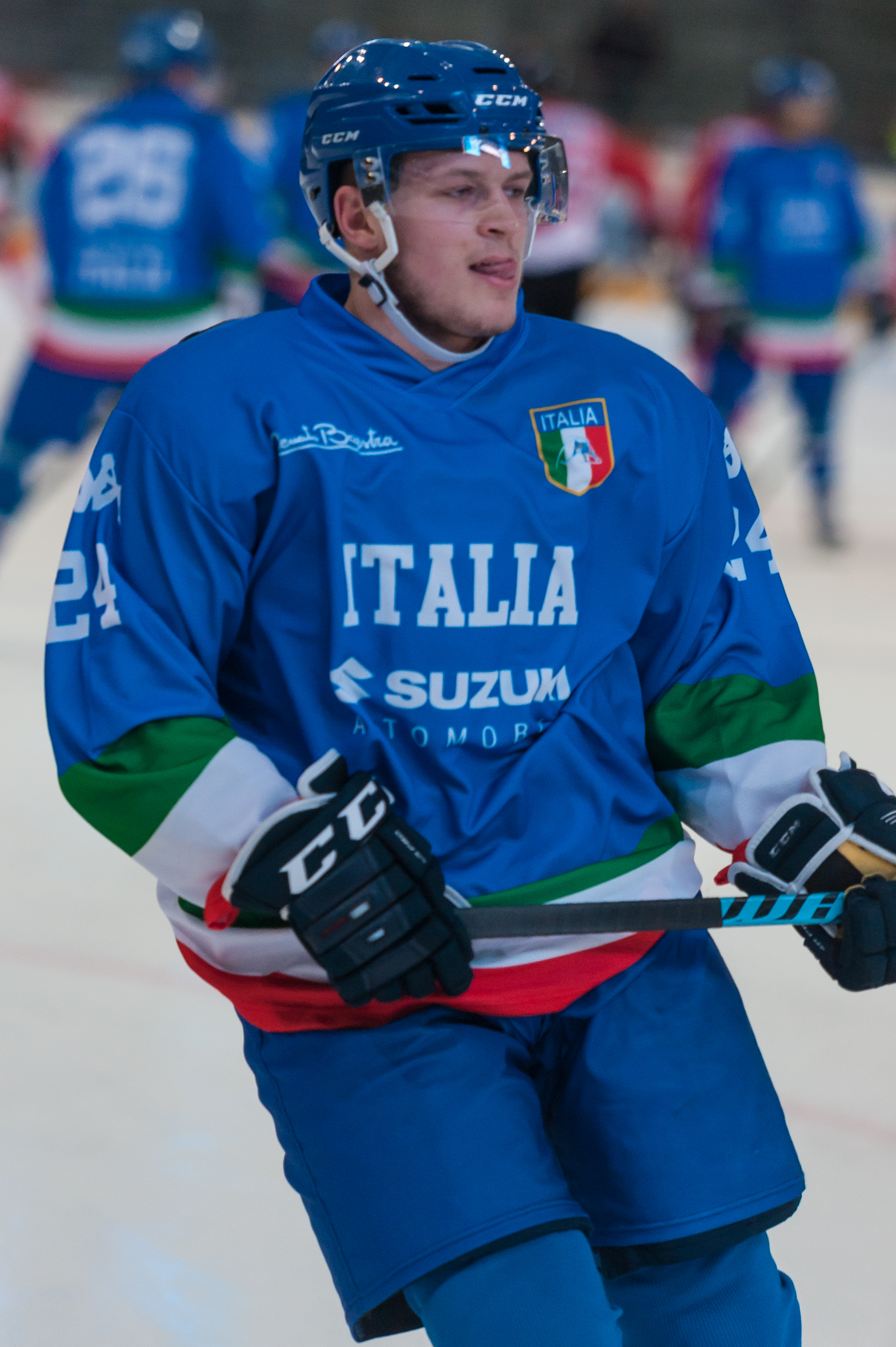
- Born: 22 February 1995 (age 31) Bolzano, Italy
- Height: 5 ft 10 in (178 cm)
- Weight: 194 lb (88 kg; 13 st 12 lb)
- Position: Forward
- Shoots: Right
- team Former teams: Free Agent; EHC München; HC Bolzano; ERC Ingolstadt; Thomas Sabo Ice Tigers
- National team: Italy
- Playing career: 2014–present

Joachim Ramoser (born 22 February 1995) is an Italian professional ice hockey Forward. He is currently an unrestricted free agent. He was last under contract with the Nürnberg Ice Tigers of the Deutsche Eishockey Liga (DEL).

== Playing career ==
He previously played as a youth within the Red Bull Austrian affiliate, EC Red Bull Salzburg of the Austrian Hockey League before moving to Germany to continue his development and make his professional debut with EHC München. In the 2016–17 season, Ramoser returned to Italy to play with HCB South Tyrol in the EBEL, appearing in just 2 games before suffering season-ending injury requiring surgery.

Out of contract with Bolzano, Ramoser opted to resume his career in Germany, agreeing to a one-year deal with ERC Ingolstadt of the DEL on 5 May 2017.

With his first season in Ingolstadt interrupted by injury, Ramoser returned for the 2018–19 season, featuring in 41 games, before opting to leave the club at the conclusion of the post-season.

As a free agent, Ramoser signed a two-year contract to continue in the DEL with the Thomas Sabo Ice Tigers on 2 May 2019.

== International play ==
Ramoser was named to the Italy national ice hockey team for competition at the 2014 IIHF World Championship.
