= Daisuke Obara =

Japanese ice hockey player (born 1981)

- Born: June 4, 1981 (age 45) Kushiro, Japan
- Height: 1.77 m (5 ft 10 in)
- Weight: 83 kg (183 lb; 13 st 1 lb)
- Position: Center
- Shoots: Left
- ALIH team Former teams: Oji Eagles; Peoria Rivermen; Charlotte Checkers; Augusta Lynx; Seibu Prince Rabbits; Nippon Paper Cranes
- National team: Japan
- Playing career: 2003–present

Daisuke Obara
Medal record

Men's ice hockey

Representing Japan

Asian Games
Gold medal – first place	2003 Aomori	Ice hockey
Gold medal – first place	2007 Changchun	Ice hockey

Daisuke Obara (小原 大輔, Obara Daisuke; born June 4, 1981) is a Japanese professional ice hockey center currently playing for the Oji Eagles of the Asia League.

Obara attended Waseda University. He began his professional career in 2003–2004, at the American ECHL, playing for the Peoria Rivermen, Charlotte Checkers and Augusta Lynx; later he played for the Kokudo/Seibu Prince Rabbits between 2004 and 2009; for the Nippon Paper Cranes from 2009 to 2014; and since 2014, the (Oji Eagles.

He also has played for the Japan national team since 2000 (Japan U20 and Senior).
