= Roman Blagoy =

Ukrainian ice hockey player

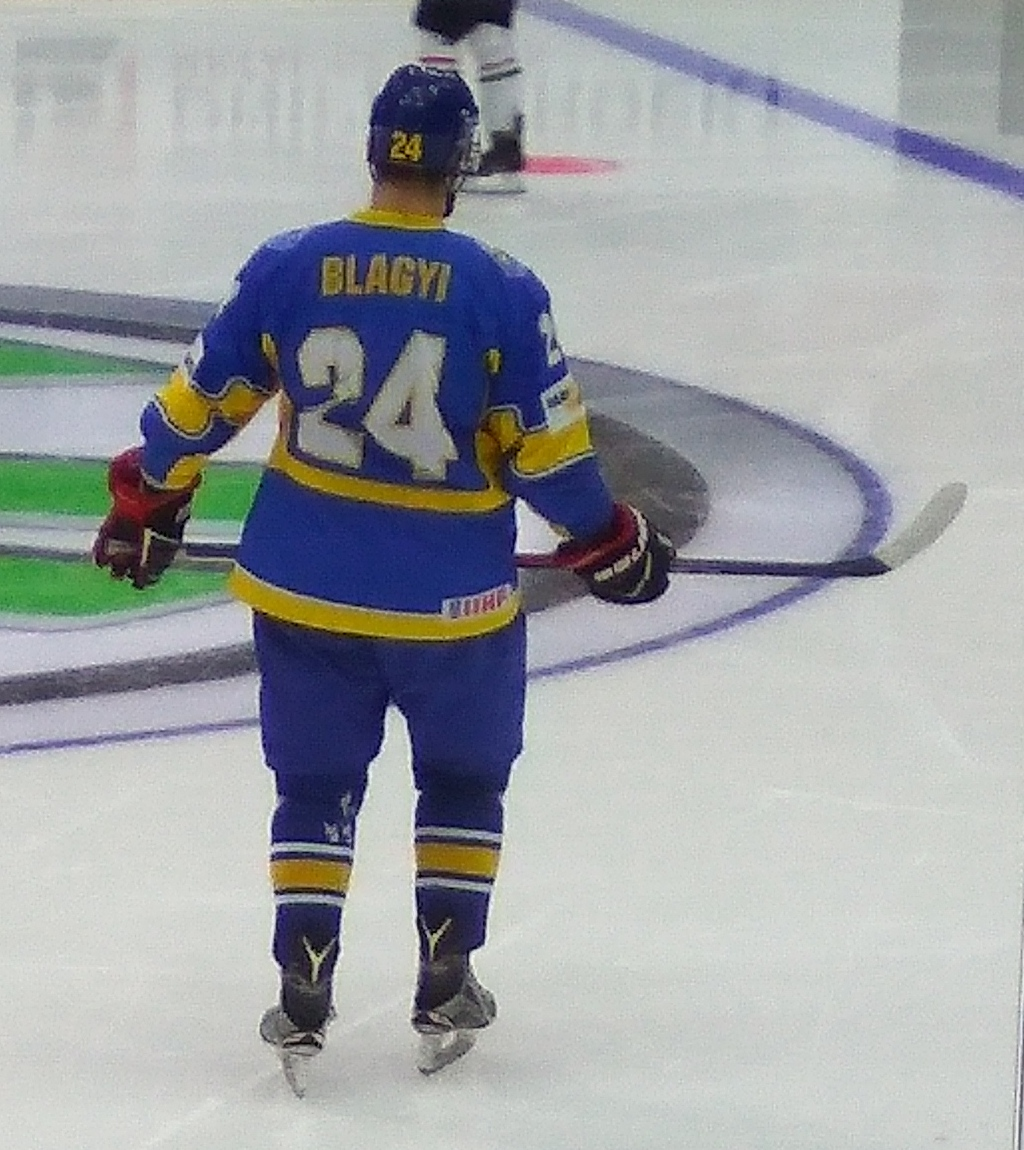
- Blagoy in 2017
- Born: 25 October 1987 (age 38) Kiev, Ukrainian SSR, Soviet Union
- Height: 190 cm (6 ft 3 in)
- Weight: 100 kg (220 lb; 15 st 10 lb)
- Position: Forward
- Shoots: Right
- Played for: HC Donbass; Metallurg Novokuznetsk
- National team: Ukraine
- Playing career: 2004–present

Roman Sergeyevich Blagoy (Ukrainian: Роман Сергійович Благий; born 25 October 1987) is a Ukrainian professional ice hockey forward.

Blagoy played in the Kontinental Hockey League for HC Donbass and Metallurg Novokuznetsk. He is also a member of the Ukrainian nation team.
