= 2019 IIHF World Championship rosters =

Each team's roster consisted of at least 15 skaters (forwards and defencemen) and two goaltenders, and at most 22 skaters and three goaltenders. All 16 participating nations, through the confirmation of their respective national associations, had to submit a roster by the first IIHF directorate meeting.

Age and team as of 10 May 2019.

== Group A ==
=== Canada ===
The roster was announced on 29 April 2019.

Head coach: Alain Vigneault

No.	Pos.	Name	Height	Weight	Birthdate	Team
4	D	Dante Fabbro	1.83 m (6 ft 0 in)	86 kg (190 lb)	20 June 1998 (aged 20)	(United States) Nashville Predators
5	D	Philippe Myers	1.96 m (6 ft 5 in)	95 kg (209 lb)	25 January 1997 (aged 22)	(United States) Philadelphia Flyers
7	F	Sean Couturier – A	1.91 m (6 ft 3 in)	96 kg (212 lb)	7 December 1992 (aged 26)	(United States) Philadelphia Flyers
10	F	Tyson Jost	1.80 m (5 ft 11 in)	87 kg (192 lb)	14 March 1998 (aged 21)	(United States) Colorado Avalanche
14	F	Adam Henrique	1.80 m (5 ft 11 in)	91 kg (201 lb)	6 February 1990 (aged 29)	(United States) Anaheim Ducks
16	F	Jared McCann	1.85 m (6 ft 1 in)	84 kg (185 lb)	31 May 1996 (aged 22)	(United States) Pittsburgh Penguins
17	F	Dylan Strome	1.90 m (6 ft 3 in)	91 kg (201 lb)	7 March 1997 (aged 22)	(United States) Chicago Blackhawks
18	F	Pierre-Luc Dubois	1.91 m (6 ft 3 in)	94 kg (207 lb)	24 June 1998 (aged 20)	(United States) Columbus Blue Jackets
19	F	Kyle Turris – C	1.85 m (6 ft 1 in)	86 kg (190 lb)	14 August 1989 (aged 29)	(United States) Nashville Predators
21	F	Mathieu Joseph	1.85 m (6 ft 1 in)	86 kg (190 lb)	9 February 1997 (aged 22)	(United States) Tampa Bay Lightning
23	F	Sam Reinhart	1.85 m (6 ft 1 in)	88 kg (194 lb)	6 November 1995 (aged 23)	(United States) Buffalo Sabres
25	D	Darnell Nurse	1.93 m (6 ft 4 in)	100 kg (220 lb)	4 February 1995 (aged 24)	(Canada) Edmonton Oilers
27	D	Shea Theodore	1.88 m (6 ft 2 in)	88 kg (194 lb)	3 August 1995 (aged 23)	(United States) Vegas Golden Knights
28	D	Damon Severson	1.88 m (6 ft 2 in)	93 kg (205 lb)	7 August 1994 (aged 24)	(United States) New Jersey Devils
29	G	Mackenzie Blackwood	1.93 m (6 ft 4 in)	102 kg (225 lb)	9 December 1996 (aged 22)	(United States) New Jersey Devils
30	G	Matt Murray	1.93 m (6 ft 4 in)	81 kg (179 lb)	25 May 1994 (aged 24)	(United States) Pittsburgh Penguins
31	G	Carter Hart	1.83 m (6 ft 0 in)	89 kg (196 lb)	13 August 1998 (aged 20)	(United States) Philadelphia Flyers
39	F	Anthony Mantha	1.96 m (6 ft 5 in)	102 kg (225 lb)	16 September 1994 (aged 24)	(United States) Detroit Red Wings
51	D	Troy Stecher	1.78 m (5 ft 10 in)	84 kg (185 lb)	7 April 1994 (aged 25)	(Canada) Vancouver Canucks
59	F	Tyler Bertuzzi	1.83 m (6 ft 0 in)	86 kg (190 lb)	24 February 1995 (aged 24)	(United States) Detroit Red Wings
61	F	Mark Stone – A	1.93 m (6 ft 4 in)	93 kg (205 lb)	13 May 1992 (aged 26)	(United States) Vegas Golden Knights
62	D	Brandon Montour	1.83 m (6 ft 0 in)	88 kg (194 lb)	11 April 1994 (aged 25)	(United States) Buffalo Sabres
71	F	Anthony Cirelli	1.83 m (6 ft 0 in)	82 kg (181 lb)	15 July 1997 (aged 21)	(United States) Tampa Bay Lightning
72	D	Thomas Chabot	1.88 m (6 ft 2 in)	89 kg (196 lb)	30 January 1997 (aged 22)	(Canada) Ottawa Senators
81	F	Jonathan Marchessault	1.75 m (5 ft 9 in)	79 kg (174 lb)	27 December 1990 (aged 28)	(United States) Vegas Golden Knights

=== Denmark ===
The roster was announced on 29 April 2019.

Head coach: Heinz Ehlers

No.	Pos.	Name	Height	Weight	Birthdate	Team
1	G	Patrick Galbraith	1.83 m (6 ft 0 in)	81 kg (179 lb)	3 November 1986 (aged 32)	(Denmark) SønderjyskE Ishockey
2	D	Phillip Bruggisser	1.83 m (6 ft 0 in)	85 kg (187 lb)	7 August 1991 (aged 27)	(Germany) Krefeld Pinguine
6	D	Stefan Lassen	1.90 m (6 ft 3 in)	90 kg (200 lb)	1 November 1985 (aged 33)	(Sweden) Almtuna IS
9	F	Frederik Storm	1.80 m (5 ft 11 in)	86 kg (190 lb)	20 February 1989 (aged 30)	(Sweden) Malmö Redhawks
15	D	Matias Lassen	1.82 m (6 ft 0 in)	82 kg (181 lb)	15 March 1996 (aged 23)	(Sweden) Malmö Redhawks
17	F	Nicklas Jensen	1.91 m (6 ft 3 in)	85 kg (187 lb)	6 March 1993 (aged 26)	(Finland) Jokerit
20	F	Lars Eller – A	1.85 m (6 ft 1 in)	90 kg (200 lb)	8 May 1989 (aged 30)	(United States) Washington Capitals
22	D	Markus Lauridsen	1.88 m (6 ft 2 in)	89 kg (196 lb)	28 February 1991 (aged 28)	(Sweden) HV71
25	D	Oliver Lauridsen	1.97 m (6 ft 6 in)	104 kg (229 lb)	24 March 1989 (aged 30)	(Finland) Jokerit
29	F	Morten Madsen – A	1.90 m (6 ft 3 in)	95 kg (209 lb)	16 January 1987 (aged 32)	(Sweden) Timrå IK
31	G	Simon Nielsen	1.88 m (6 ft 2 in)	81 kg (179 lb)	27 October 1986 (aged 32)	(Denmark) Herning Blue Fox
32	G	Sebastian Dahm	1.82 m (6 ft 0 in)	80 kg (180 lb)	28 February 1987 (aged 32)	(Germany) Iserlohn Roosters
33	F	Julian Jakobsen	1.84 m (6 ft 0 in)	87 kg (192 lb)	11 April 1987 (aged 32)	(Denmark) Aalborg Pirates
38	F	Morten Poulsen	1.84 m (6 ft 0 in)	84 kg (185 lb)	9 September 1988 (aged 30)	(Denmark) Herning Blue Fox
40	F	Jesper Jensen	1.83 m (6 ft 0 in)	80 kg (180 lb)	5 February 1987 (aged 32)	(Sweden) Skellefteå AIK
41	D	Jesper Jensen	1.83 m (6 ft 0 in)	86 kg (190 lb)	30 July 1991 (aged 27)	(Finland) Jokerit
47	D	Oliver Larsen	1.90 m (6 ft 3 in)	94 kg (207 lb)	25 February 1998 (aged 21)	(Sweden) IK Pantern
48	D	Nicholas Jensen	1.89 m (6 ft 2 in)	90 kg (200 lb)	8 April 1989 (aged 30)	(Germany) Fischtown Pinguins
50	F	Mathias Bau	2.00 m (6 ft 7 in)	108 kg (238 lb)	7 March 1993 (aged 26)	(United States) Hershey Bears
63	F	Patrick Russell	1.86 m (6 ft 1 in)	93 kg (205 lb)	4 January 1993 (aged 26)	(United States) Bakersfield Condors
72	F	Nicolai Meyer	1.83 m (6 ft 0 in)	82 kg (181 lb)	21 July 1993 (aged 25)	(Sweden) Södertälje SK
75	F	Mathias From	1.86 m (6 ft 1 in)	85 kg (187 lb)	16 December 1997 (aged 21)	(Sweden) AIK Stockholm
89	F	Mikkel Bødker	1.80 m (5 ft 11 in)	88 kg (194 lb)	16 December 1989 (aged 29)	(Canada) Ottawa Senators
93	F	Peter Regin – C	1.87 m (6 ft 2 in)	90 kg (200 lb)	16 April 1986 (aged 33)	(Finland) Jokerit
95	F	Nick Olesen	1.85 m (6 ft 1 in)	80 kg (180 lb)	14 November 1995 (aged 23)	(Sweden) IK Pantern

=== Finland ===
A 28-player roster was announced on 27 April 2019. The final roster was revealed on 5 May 2019.

Head coach: Jukka Jalonen

No.	Pos.	Name	Height	Weight	Birthdate	Team
4	D	Mikko Lehtonen – A	1.83 m (6 ft 0 in)	89 kg (196 lb)	16 January 1994 (aged 25)	(Sweden) HV71
7	D	Oliwer Kaski	1.90 m (6 ft 3 in)	85 kg (187 lb)	4 September 1995 (aged 23)	(Finland) Lahti Pelicans
12	F	Marko Anttila – C	2.03 m (6 ft 8 in)	104 kg (229 lb)	27 May 1985 (aged 33)	(Finland) Jokerit
15	F	Arttu Ilomäki	1.82 m (6 ft 0 in)	89 kg (196 lb)	12 June 1991 (aged 27)	(Finland) Lukko
19	F	Veli-Matti Savinainen – A	1.82 m (6 ft 0 in)	82 kg (181 lb)	5 January 1986 (aged 33)	(China) Kunlun Red Star
20	F	Niko Ojamäki	1.81 m (5 ft 11 in)	84 kg (185 lb)	17 June 1995 (aged 23)	(Finland) Tappara
21	F	Juhani Tyrväinen	1.81 m (5 ft 11 in)	86 kg (190 lb)	11 September 1990 (aged 28)	(Finland) HIFK
24	F	Kaapo Kakko	1.87 m (6 ft 2 in)	82 kg (181 lb)	13 February 2001 (aged 18)	(Finland) TPS
25	F	Toni Rajala	1.79 m (5 ft 10 in)	76 kg (168 lb)	29 March 1991 (aged 28)	(Switzerland) EHC Biel
27	F	Eetu Luostarinen	1.90 m (6 ft 3 in)	86 kg (190 lb)	2 September 1998 (aged 20)	(Finland) KalPa
28	D	Henri Jokiharju	1.83 m (6 ft 0 in)	87 kg (192 lb)	17 June 1999 (aged 19)	(United States) Chicago Blackhawks
30	G	Kevin Lankinen	1.87 m (6 ft 2 in)	84 kg (185 lb)	28 April 1995 (aged 24)	(United States) Rockford IceHogs
35	G	Veini Vehviläinen	1.84 m (6 ft 0 in)	79 kg (174 lb)	13 February 1997 (aged 22)	(Finland) Oulun Kärpät
40	D	Petteri Lindbohm	1.90 m (6 ft 3 in)	95 kg (209 lb)	23 September 1993 (aged 25)	(Switzerland) Lausanne HC
41	F	Joel Kiviranta	1.80 m (5 ft 11 in)	80 kg (180 lb)	23 March 1996 (aged 23)	(Finland) Vaasan Sport
45	G	Jussi Olkinuora	1.89 m (6 ft 2 in)	91 kg (201 lb)	4 November 1990 (aged 28)	(Finland) Lahti Pelicans
50	D	Miika Koivisto	1.84 m (6 ft 0 in)	88 kg (194 lb)	20 July 1990 (aged 28)	(Russia) HC Dynamo Moscow
55	D	Atte Ohtamaa	1.88 m (6 ft 2 in)	96 kg (212 lb)	6 November 1987 (aged 31)	(Finland) Oulun Kärpät
58	D	Jani Hakanpää	1.95 m (6 ft 5 in)	99 kg (218 lb)	31 March 1992 (aged 27)	(Finland) Oulun Kärpät
65	F	Sakari Manninen	1.70 m (5 ft 7 in)	71 kg (157 lb)	10 February 1992 (aged 27)	(Finland) Jokerit
70	D	Niko Mikkola	1.94 m (6 ft 4 in)	84 kg (185 lb)	27 April 1996 (aged 23)	(United States) San Antonio Rampage
71	F	Kristian Kuusela	1.75 m (5 ft 9 in)	82 kg (181 lb)	19 February 1983 (aged 36)	(Finland) Tappara
76	F	Jere Sallinen	1.87 m (6 ft 2 in)	91 kg (201 lb)	26 October 1990 (aged 28)	(Sweden) Örebro HK
82	F	Harri Pesonen	1.82 m (6 ft 0 in)	88 kg (194 lb)	6 August 1988 (aged 30)	(Switzerland) SCL Tigers
91	F	Juho Lammikko	1.90 m (6 ft 3 in)	91 kg (201 lb)	29 January 1996 (aged 23)	(United States) Florida Panthers

=== France ===
The roster was announced on 29 April 2019.

Head coach: Philippe Bozon

No.	Pos.	Name	Height	Weight	Birthdate	Team
3	D	Jonathan Janil	1.89 m (6 ft 2 in)	95 kg (209 lb)	24 September 1987 (aged 31)	(France) Boxers de Bordeaux
4	D	Antonin Manavian	1.90 m (6 ft 3 in)	96 kg (212 lb)	26 April 1987 (aged 32)	(France) Brûleurs de Loups
8	D	Hugo Gallet	1.92 m (6 ft 4 in)	94 kg (207 lb)	20 June 1997 (aged 21)	(France) Boxers de Bordeaux
9	F	Damien Fleury – C	1.80 m (5 ft 11 in)	84 kg (185 lb)	1 February 1986 (aged 33)	(France) Brûleurs de Loups
12	F	Valentin Claireaux – A	1.80 m (5 ft 11 in)	86 kg (190 lb)	5 April 1991 (aged 28)	(Finland) Vaasan Sport
13	F	Peter Valier	1.80 m (5 ft 11 in)	82 kg (181 lb)	27 July 1992 (aged 26)	(France) Boxers de Bordeaux
20	F	Eliot Berthon	1.71 m (5 ft 7 in)	82 kg (181 lb)	27 April 1992 (aged 27)	(Switzerland) Genève-Servette HC
22	F	Guillaume Leclerc	1.73 m (5 ft 8 in)	80 kg (180 lb)	20 February 1996 (aged 23)	(France) Brûleurs de Loups
25	F	Nicolas Ritz	1.80 m (5 ft 11 in)	90 kg (200 lb)	26 February 1992 (aged 27)	(France) Dragons de Rouen
35	G	Henri-Corentin Buysse	1.85 m (6 ft 1 in)	86 kg (190 lb)	18 March 1988 (aged 31)	(France) Gothiques d'Amiens
37	G	Sebastian Ylönen	1.86 m (6 ft 1 in)	82 kg (181 lb)	3 July 1991 (aged 27)	(France) Anglet Hormadi Élite
38	D	Pierre Crinon	1.95 m (6 ft 5 in)	99 kg (218 lb)	2 August 1995 (aged 23)	(France) Rapaces de Gap
44	D	Olivier Dame-Malka	1.79 m (5 ft 10 in)	93 kg (205 lb)	30 May 1990 (aged 28)	(France) Nice hockey Côte d'Azur
49	G	Florian Hardy	1.83 m (6 ft 0 in)	83 kg (183 lb)	8 February 1985 (aged 34)	(France) Ducs d'Angers
61	F	Cédric Di Dio Balsamo	1.80 m (5 ft 11 in)	80 kg (180 lb)	27 March 1994 (aged 25)	(France) LHC Les Lions
62	D	Florian Chakiachvili	1.87 m (6 ft 2 in)	87 kg (192 lb)	18 March 1992 (aged 27)	(France) Dragons de Rouen
63	F	Alexandre Texier	1.85 m (6 ft 1 in)	87 kg (192 lb)	13 September 1999 (aged 19)	(United States) Columbus Blue Jackets
71	F	Anthony Guttig	1.86 m (6 ft 1 in)	85 kg (187 lb)	30 October 1988 (aged 30)	(France) Dragons de Rouen
72	F	Jordann Perret	1.79 m (5 ft 10 in)	81 kg (179 lb)	15 October 1994 (aged 24)	(Czech Republic) HC Dynamo Pardubice
74	D	Thomas Thiry	1.91 m (6 ft 3 in)	101 kg (223 lb)	9 September 1997 (aged 21)	(Switzerland) EV Zug
77	F	Sacha Treille	1.94 m (6 ft 4 in)	95 kg (209 lb)	6 November 1987 (aged 31)	(France) Brûleurs de Loups
81	F	Anthony Rech	1.80 m (5 ft 11 in)	85 kg (187 lb)	9 July 1992 (aged 26)	(Germany) Schwenninger Wild Wings
82	F	Charles Bertrand	1.85 m (6 ft 1 in)	91 kg (201 lb)	5 February 1991 (aged 28)	(Switzerland) HC Fribourg-Gottéron
84	D	Kévin Hecquefeuille – A	1.81 m (5 ft 11 in)	81 kg (179 lb)	20 November 1984 (aged 34)	(France) Scorpions de Mulhouse
94	F	Tim Bozon	1.86 m (6 ft 1 in)	92 kg (203 lb)	24 March 1994 (aged 25)	(Switzerland) Genève-Servette HC

=== Germany ===
A 27-player roster was announced on 30 April 2019. The final roster was revealed on 8 May 2019.

Head coach: Toni Söderholm

No.	Pos.	Name	Height	Weight	Birthdate	Team
2	D	Denis Reul	1.93 m (6 ft 4 in)	110 kg (240 lb)	29 June 1989 (aged 29)	(Germany) Adler Mannheim
5	D	Korbinian Holzer	1.90 m (6 ft 3 in)	94 kg (207 lb)	16 February 1988 (aged 31)	(United States) Anaheim Ducks
11	D	Marco Nowak	1.89 m (6 ft 2 in)	93 kg (205 lb)	23 July 1990 (aged 28)	(Germany) Düsseldorfer EG
15	F	Stefan Loibl	1.86 m (6 ft 1 in)	83 kg (183 lb)	24 June 1996 (aged 22)	(Germany) Straubing Tigers
19	D	Benedikt Schopper	1.89 m (6 ft 2 in)	90 kg (200 lb)	18 February 1985 (aged 34)	(Germany) Straubing Tigers
21	D	Moritz Seider	1.92 m (6 ft 4 in)	90 kg (200 lb)	6 April 2001 (aged 18)	(Germany) Adler Mannheim
22	F	Matthias Plachta	1.88 m (6 ft 2 in)	100 kg (220 lb)	16 May 1991 (aged 27)	(Germany) Adler Mannheim
28	F	Frank Mauer	1.84 m (6 ft 0 in)	90 kg (200 lb)	12 April 1988 (aged 31)	(Germany) EHC Red Bull München
29	F	Leon Draisaitl – A	1.89 m (6 ft 2 in)	96 kg (212 lb)	27 October 1995 (aged 23)	(Canada) Edmonton Oilers
30	G	Philipp Grubauer	1.85 m (6 ft 1 in)	84 kg (185 lb)	25 November 1991 (aged 27)	(United States) Colorado Avalanche
31	G	Niklas Treutle	1.87 m (6 ft 2 in)	85 kg (187 lb)	29 April 1991 (aged 28)	(Germany) Thomas Sabo Ice Tigers
35	G	Mathias Niederberger	1.80 m (5 ft 11 in)	80 kg (180 lb)	26 November 1992 (aged 26)	(Germany) Düsseldorfer EG
36	D	Yannic Seidenberg	1.72 m (5 ft 8 in)	82 kg (181 lb)	11 January 1984 (aged 35)	(Germany) EHC Red Bull München
41	D	Jonas Müller	1.83 m (6 ft 0 in)	88 kg (194 lb)	19 November 1995 (aged 23)	(Germany) Eisbären Berlin
42	F	Yasin Ehliz	1.77 m (5 ft 10 in)	84 kg (185 lb)	30 December 1992 (aged 26)	(Germany) EHC Red Bull München
43	F	Gerrit Fauser	1.83 m (6 ft 0 in)	89 kg (196 lb)	13 July 1989 (aged 29)	(Germany) Grizzlys Wolfsburg
50	F	Patrick Hager – A	1.78 m (5 ft 10 in)	82 kg (181 lb)	8 September 1988 (aged 30)	(Germany) EHC Red Bull München
54	F	Lean Bergmann	1.87 m (6 ft 2 in)	93 kg (205 lb)	4 October 1998 (aged 20)	(Germany) Iserlohn Roosters
58	F	Markus Eisenschmid	1.84 m (6 ft 0 in)	82 kg (181 lb)	22 January 1995 (aged 24)	(Germany) Adler Mannheim
65	F	Marc Michaelis	1.77 m (5 ft 10 in)	79 kg (174 lb)	31 July 1995 (aged 23)	(United States) Minnesota State Univ.
72	F	Dominik Kahun	1.80 m (5 ft 11 in)	82 kg (181 lb)	2 July 1995 (aged 23)	(United States) Chicago Blackhawks
83	F	Leonhard Pföderl	1.82 m (6 ft 0 in)	87 kg (192 lb)	1 September 1993 (aged 25)	(Germany) Thomas Sabo Ice Tigers
91	D	Moritz Müller – C	1.87 m (6 ft 2 in)	92 kg (203 lb)	19 November 1986 (aged 32)	(Germany) Kölner Haie
92	F	Marcel Noebels	1.92 m (6 ft 4 in)	92 kg (203 lb)	14 March 1992 (aged 27)	(Germany) Eisbären Berlin
95	F	Frederik Tiffels	1.85 m (6 ft 1 in)	91 kg (201 lb)	20 May 1995 (aged 23)	(Germany) Kölner Haie

=== Great Britain ===
The roster was announced on 22 April 2019.

Head coach: Peter Russell

No.	Pos.	Name	Height	Weight	Birthdate	Team
1	G	Jackson Whistle	1.85 m (6 ft 1 in)	87 kg (192 lb)	9 June 1995 (aged 23)	(United Kingdom) Sheffield Steelers
2	D	Dallas Ehrhardt	1.93 m (6 ft 4 in)	102 kg (225 lb)	31 July 1992 (aged 26)	(United Kingdom) Manchester Storm
4	D	Stephen Lee	1.83 m (6 ft 0 in)	90 kg (200 lb)	1 October 1990 (aged 28)	(United Kingdom) Nottingham Panthers
5	F	Ben Davies	1.72 m (5 ft 8 in)	75 kg (165 lb)	18 January 1991 (aged 28)	(United Kingdom) Guildford Flames
7	F	Robert Lachowicz	1.78 m (5 ft 10 in)	76 kg (168 lb)	8 February 1990 (aged 29)	(United Kingdom) Nottingham Panthers
8	F	Matthew Myers	1.89 m (6 ft 2 in)	93 kg (205 lb)	6 November 1984 (aged 34)	(United Kingdom) Cardiff Devils
9	F	Brett Perlini	1.88 m (6 ft 2 in)	91 kg (201 lb)	14 June 1990 (aged 28)	(United Kingdom) Nottingham Panthers
10	F	Robert Farmer	1.90 m (6 ft 3 in)	94 kg (207 lb)	21 March 1991 (aged 28)	(United Kingdom) Nottingham Panthers
11	F	Joseph Lewis	1.74 m (5 ft 9 in)	80 kg (180 lb)	26 July 1992 (aged 26)	(Germany) ESV Kaufbeuren
13	D	David Phillips	1.91 m (6 ft 3 in)	85 kg (187 lb)	14 August 1987 (aged 31)	(United Kingdom) Sheffield Steelers
14	F	Liam Kirk	1.82 m (6 ft 0 in)	72 kg (159 lb)	3 January 2000 (aged 19)	(Canada) Peterborough Petes
17	D	Mark Richardson – A	1.83 m (6 ft 0 in)	88 kg (194 lb)	3 October 1986 (aged 32)	(United Kingdom) Cardiff Devils
19	F	Colin Shields	1.80 m (5 ft 11 in)	82 kg (181 lb)	27 January 1980 (aged 39)	(United Kingdom) Belfast Giants
20	F	Jonathan Phillips – C	1.75 m (5 ft 9 in)	81 kg (179 lb)	14 July 1982 (aged 36)	(United Kingdom) Sheffield Steelers
21	F	Mike Hammond	1.78 m (5 ft 10 in)	82 kg (181 lb)	21 February 1990 (aged 29)	(United Kingdom) Manchester Storm
23	D	Paul Swindlehurst	1.93 m (6 ft 4 in)	90 kg (200 lb)	25 March 1993 (aged 26)	(United Kingdom) Belfast Giants
26	D	Evan Mosey	1.80 m (5 ft 11 in)	84 kg (185 lb)	17 March 1989 (aged 30)	(United Kingdom) Cardiff Devils
27	F	Luke Ferrara	1.80 m (5 ft 11 in)	89 kg (196 lb)	7 June 1993 (aged 25)	(United Kingdom) Coventry Blaze
28	D	Ben O'Connor	1.85 m (6 ft 1 in)	85 kg (187 lb)	21 December 1988 (aged 30)	(United Kingdom) Sheffield Steelers
30	G	Thomas Murdy	1.72 m (5 ft 8 in)	71 kg (157 lb)	26 April 1991 (aged 28)	(United Kingdom) Cardiff Devils
33	G	Ben Bowns	1.83 m (6 ft 0 in)	81 kg (179 lb)	21 January 1991 (aged 28)	(United Kingdom) Cardiff Devils
54	D	Tim Billingsley	1.88 m (6 ft 2 in)	91 kg (201 lb)	17 January 1990 (aged 29)	(United Kingdom) Nottingham Panthers
74	F	Ollie Betteridge	1.80 m (5 ft 11 in)	80 kg (180 lb)	16 January 1996 (aged 23)	(United Kingdom) Nottingham Panthers
75	F	Robert Dowd – A	1.78 m (5 ft 10 in)	80 kg (180 lb)	26 May 1988 (aged 30)	(United Kingdom) Sheffield Steelers
91	F	Ben Lake	1.80 m (5 ft 11 in)	77 kg (170 lb)	31 May 1990 (aged 28)	(United Kingdom) Coventry Blaze

=== Slovakia ===
A 28-player roster was announced on 3 May 2019. The final roster was revealed on 8 May 2019.

Head coach: Craig Ramsay

No.	Pos.	Name	Height	Weight	Birthdate	Team
1	G	Marek Čiliak	1.82 m (6 ft 0 in)	90 kg (200 lb)	2 April 1990 (aged 29)	(Czech Republic) HC Kometa Brno
2	D	Andrej Sekera – C	1.83 m (6 ft 0 in)	91 kg (201 lb)	8 June 1986 (aged 32)	(Canada) Edmonton Oilers
6	D	Martin Fehérváry	1.88 m (6 ft 2 in)	88 kg (194 lb)	6 October 1999 (aged 19)	(Sweden) HV71
12	F	Dávid Bondra	1.80 m (5 ft 11 in)	86 kg (190 lb)	26 August 1992 (aged 26)	(Slovakia) HK Poprad
13	F	Michal Krištof	1.76 m (5 ft 9 in)	72 kg (159 lb)	11 October 1993 (aged 25)	(Finland) Oulun Kärpät
14	F	Richard Pánik	1.85 m (6 ft 1 in)	94 kg (207 lb)	7 February 1991 (aged 28)	(United States) Arizona Coyotes
16	F	Róbert Lantoši	1.80 m (5 ft 11 in)	84 kg (185 lb)	24 September 1995 (aged 23)	(Slovakia) HK Nitra
17	F	Dávid Buc	1.87 m (6 ft 2 in)	94 kg (207 lb)	22 January 1987 (aged 32)	(Slovakia) HC Slovan Bratislava
19	F	Matúš Sukeľ	1.76 m (5 ft 9 in)	78 kg (172 lb)	23 January 1996 (aged 23)	(Slovakia) HC Slovan Bratislava
23	F	Adam Liška	1.80 m (5 ft 11 in)	84 kg (185 lb)	14 October 1999 (aged 19)	(Slovakia) HC Slovan Bratislava
24	F	Tomáš Zigo	1.86 m (6 ft 1 in)	87 kg (192 lb)	11 April 1992 (aged 27)	(Slovakia) HC '05 Banská Bystrica
27	F	Ladislav Nagy – A	1.79 m (5 ft 10 in)	87 kg (192 lb)	1 June 1979 (aged 39)	(Slovakia) HC Košice
28	F	Marian Studenič	1.85 m (6 ft 1 in)	80 kg (180 lb)	28 October 1998 (aged 20)	(United States) Binghamton Devils
30	G	Denis Godla	1.80 m (5 ft 11 in)	81 kg (179 lb)	4 April 1995 (aged 24)	(Finland) KalPa
42	G	Patrik Rybár	1.90 m (6 ft 3 in)	86 kg (190 lb)	9 November 1993 (aged 25)	(United States) Grand Rapids Griffins
47	F	Mário Lunter	1.82 m (6 ft 0 in)	90 kg (200 lb)	20 June 1994 (aged 24)	(Slovakia) HC '05 Banská Bystrica
52	D	Martin Marinčin	1.95 m (6 ft 5 in)	95 kg (209 lb)	18 February 1992 (aged 27)	(Canada) Toronto Maple Leafs
56	F	Marko Daňo	1.82 m (6 ft 0 in)	96 kg (212 lb)	30 November 1994 (aged 24)	(Canada) Manitoba Moose
64	D	Patrik Koch	1.86 m (6 ft 1 in)	86 kg (190 lb)	8 December 1996 (aged 22)	(Slovakia) HC Košice
65	D	Michal Čajkovský	1.92 m (6 ft 4 in)	107 kg (236 lb)	6 May 1992 (aged 27)	(Russia) HC Dynamo Moscow
71	D	Marek Ďaloga	1.94 m (6 ft 4 in)	86 kg (190 lb)	10 March 1989 (aged 30)	(Sweden) Mora IK
79	F	Libor Hudáček	1.77 m (5 ft 10 in)	80 kg (180 lb)	7 September 1990 (aged 28)	(Czech Republic) HC Bílí Tygři Liberec
81	D	Erik Černák	1.92 m (6 ft 4 in)	102 kg (225 lb)	28 May 1997 (aged 21)	(United States) Tampa Bay Lightning
83	D	Christián Jaroš	1.92 m (6 ft 4 in)	95 kg (209 lb)	2 April 1996 (aged 23)	(Canada) Ottawa Senators
90	F	Tomáš Tatar – A	1.79 m (5 ft 10 in)	84 kg (185 lb)	1 October 1990 (aged 28)	(Canada) Montreal Canadiens

=== United States ===
A 23-player roster was announced on 1 May 2019.

Head coach: Jeff Blashill

No.	Pos.	Name	Height	Weight	Birthdate	Team
1	G	Cayden Primeau	1.91 m (6 ft 3 in)	90 kg (200 lb)	11 August 1999 (aged 19)	(United States) Northeastern Univ.
6	F	Jack Hughes	1.79 m (5 ft 10 in)	77 kg (170 lb)	14 May 2001 (aged 17)	(United States) U.S. NTDP
7	D	Zach Werenski	1.88 m (6 ft 2 in)	95 kg (209 lb)	19 July 1997 (aged 21)	(United States) Columbus Blue Jackets
8	D	Adam Fox	1.80 m (5 ft 11 in)	82 kg (181 lb)	17 February 1998 (aged 21)	(United States) New York Rangers
9	F	Jack Eichel	1.88 m (6 ft 2 in)	91 kg (201 lb)	28 October 1996 (aged 22)	(United States) Buffalo Sabres
10	F	Derek Ryan	1.80 m (5 ft 11 in)	77 kg (170 lb)	29 December 1986 (aged 32)	(Canada) Calgary Flames
11	F	Luke Kunin	1.82 m (6 ft 0 in)	87 kg (192 lb)	4 December 1997 (aged 21)	(United States) Minnesota Wild
12	F	Alex DeBrincat	1.70 m (5 ft 7 in)	75 kg (165 lb)	18 December 1997 (aged 21)	(United States) Chicago Blackhawks
13	F	Johnny Gaudreau	1.70 m (5 ft 7 in)	71 kg (157 lb)	13 August 1993 (aged 25)	(Canada) Calgary Flames
18	F	Chris Kreider	1.91 m (6 ft 3 in)	100 kg (220 lb)	30 April 1991 (aged 28)	(United States) New York Rangers
19	F	Clayton Keller	1.78 m (5 ft 10 in)	77 kg (170 lb)	19 November 1998 (aged 20)	(United States) Arizona Coyotes
20	D	Ryan Suter – A	1.88 m (6 ft 2 in)	94 kg (207 lb)	21 January 1985 (aged 34)	(United States) Minnesota Wild
21	F	Dylan Larkin – A	1.85 m (6 ft 1 in)	90 kg (200 lb)	30 July 1996 (aged 22)	(United States) Detroit Red Wings
25	F	James van Riemsdyk	1.91 m (6 ft 3 in)	98 kg (216 lb)	4 May 1989 (aged 30)	(United States) Philadelphia Flyers
27	D	Alec Martinez	1.85 m (6 ft 1 in)	95 kg (209 lb)	26 July 1987 (aged 31)	(United States) Los Angeles Kings
30	G	Thatcher Demko	1.93 m (6 ft 4 in)	87 kg (192 lb)	8 December 1995 (aged 23)	(Canada) Vancouver Canucks
35	G	Cory Schneider	1.91 m (6 ft 3 in)	91 kg (201 lb)	18 March 1986 (aged 33)	(United States) New Jersey Devils
36	F	Colin White	1.83 m (6 ft 0 in)	83 kg (183 lb)	30 January 1997 (aged 22)	(Canada) Ottawa Senators
41	F	Luke Glendening	1.80 m (5 ft 11 in)	87 kg (192 lb)	28 April 1989 (aged 30)	(United States) Detroit Red Wings
43	D	Quinn Hughes	1.78 m (5 ft 10 in)	77 kg (170 lb)	14 October 1999 (aged 19)	(Canada) Vancouver Canucks
55	D	Noah Hanifin	1.91 m (6 ft 3 in)	93 kg (205 lb)	25 January 1997 (aged 22)	(Canada) Calgary Flames
72	F	Frank Vatrano	1.75 m (5 ft 9 in)	91 kg (201 lb)	14 March 1994 (aged 25)	(United States) Florida Panthers
76	D	Brady Skjei	1.91 m (6 ft 3 in)	97 kg (214 lb)	26 March 1994 (aged 25)	(United States) New York Rangers
86	D	Christian Wolanin	1.88 m (6 ft 2 in)	84 kg (185 lb)	17 March 1995 (aged 24)	(Canada) Ottawa Senators
88	F	Patrick Kane – C	1.78 m (5 ft 10 in)	80 kg (180 lb)	19 November 1988 (aged 30)	(United States) Chicago Blackhawks

== Group B ==
=== Austria ===
A 29-player roster was announced on 29 April 2019. The roster was cut down to 26 on 6 May 2019.

Head coach: Roger Bader

No.	Pos.	Name	Height	Weight	Birthdate	Team
5	F	Thomas Raffl – C	1.94 m (6 ft 4 in)	106 kg (234 lb)	19 June 1986 (aged 32)	(Austria) EC Red Bull Salzburg
9	F	Alexander Rauchenwald	1.79 m (5 ft 10 in)	85 kg (187 lb)	11 May 1993 (aged 25)	(Austria) EC Red Bull Salzburg
12	F	Michael Raffl	1.84 m (6 ft 0 in)	88 kg (194 lb)	1 December 1988 (aged 30)	(United States) Philadelphia Flyers
13	F	Patrick Obrist	1.85 m (6 ft 1 in)	90 kg (200 lb)	27 February 1993 (aged 26)	(Switzerland) EHC Kloten
14	D	Patrick Peter	1.83 m (6 ft 0 in)	90 kg (200 lb)	27 January 1994 (aged 25)	(Austria) Vienna Capitals
16	F	Dominic Zwerger	1.83 m (6 ft 0 in)	93 kg (205 lb)	16 July 1996 (aged 22)	(Switzerland) HC Ambrì-Piotta
17	F	Manuel Ganahl – A	1.82 m (6 ft 0 in)	78 kg (172 lb)	12 July 1990 (aged 28)	(Finland) Lukko
21	F	Lukas Haudum	1.83 m (6 ft 0 in)	83 kg (183 lb)	21 May 1997 (aged 21)	(Sweden) IK Pantern
23	F	Fabio Hofer	1.70 m (5 ft 7 in)	75 kg (165 lb)	23 January 1991 (aged 28)	(Switzerland) HC Ambrì-Piotta
24	D	Steven Strong	1.83 m (6 ft 0 in)	87 kg (192 lb)	16 February 1993 (aged 26)	(Austria) EC KAC
27	F	Thomas Hundertpfund – A	1.90 m (6 ft 3 in)	97 kg (214 lb)	14 December 1989 (aged 29)	(Austria) EC KAC
28	D	Martin Schumnig	1.81 m (5 ft 11 in)	78 kg (172 lb)	28 July 1989 (aged 29)	(Austria) EC KAC
29	G	Bernhard Starkbaum	1.86 m (6 ft 1 in)	89 kg (196 lb)	19 February 1986 (aged 33)	(Austria) Vienna Capitals
30	G	David Kickert	1.87 m (6 ft 2 in)	77 kg (170 lb)	16 March 1994 (aged 25)	(Austria) EHC Black Wings Linz
55	D	Raphael Wolf	1.97 m (6 ft 6 in)	92 kg (203 lb)	29 December 1995 (aged 23)	(Austria) Dornbirner EC
60	G	Lukas Herzog	1.83 m (6 ft 0 in)	77 kg (170 lb)	7 February 1993 (aged 26)	(Austria) EC Red Bull Salzburg
63	D	Markus Schlacher	1.85 m (6 ft 1 in)	87 kg (192 lb)	23 August 1987 (aged 31)	(Austria) EC VSV
67	F	Konstantin Komarek	1.79 m (5 ft 10 in)	88 kg (194 lb)	8 November 1992 (aged 26)	(Sweden) Malmö Redhawks
89	F	Raphael Herburger	1.78 m (5 ft 10 in)	75 kg (165 lb)	2 January 1989 (aged 30)	(Austria) EC Red Bull Salzburg
90	D	Alexander Pallestrang	1.81 m (5 ft 11 in)	89 kg (196 lb)	4 April 1990 (aged 29)	(Austria) EC Red Bull Salzburg
91	D	Dominique Heinrich	1.75 m (5 ft 9 in)	76 kg (168 lb)	31 July 1990 (aged 28)	(Austria) EC Red Bull Salzburg
92	D	Clemens Unterweger	1.83 m (6 ft 0 in)	84 kg (185 lb)	1 April 1992 (aged 27)	(Austria) EC KAC
94	F	Alexander Cijan	1.80 m (5 ft 11 in)	87 kg (192 lb)	16 May 1994 (aged 24)	(Austria) EC Red Bull Salzburg
98	F	Benjamin Baumgartner	1.75 m (5 ft 9 in)	75 kg (165 lb)	22 April 2000 (aged 19)	(Switzerland) HC Davos

=== Czech Republic ===
A 36-player roster was announced on 28 April 2019. The final roster was revealed on 5 May 2019.

Head coach: Miloš Říha

No.	Pos.	Name	Height	Weight	Birthdate	Team
3	D	Radko Gudas – A	1.83 m (6 ft 0 in)	93 kg (205 lb)	5 June 1990 (aged 28)	(United States) Philadelphia Flyers
6	D	David Musil	1.92 m (6 ft 4 in)	92 kg (203 lb)	9 April 1993 (aged 26)	(Czech Republic) HC Oceláři Třinec
9	D	David Sklenička	1.80 m (5 ft 11 in)	82 kg (181 lb)	8 September 1996 (aged 22)	(Canada) Laval Rocket
11	D	Michal Moravčík	1.94 m (6 ft 4 in)	96 kg (212 lb)	7 December 1994 (aged 24)	(Czech Republic) HC Škoda Plzeň
12	F	Dominik Simon	1.80 m (5 ft 11 in)	80 kg (180 lb)	8 August 1994 (aged 24)	(United States) Pittsburgh Penguins
13	F	Jakub Vrána	1.83 m (6 ft 0 in)	80 kg (180 lb)	28 February 1996 (aged 23)	(United States) Washington Capitals
17	D	Filip Hronek	1.82 m (6 ft 0 in)	75 kg (165 lb)	2 November 1997 (aged 21)	(United States) Detroit Red Wings
18	F	Ondřej Palát	1.81 m (5 ft 11 in)	79 kg (174 lb)	28 March 1991 (aged 28)	(United States) Tampa Bay Lightning
20	F	Hynek Zohorna	1.88 m (6 ft 2 in)	94 kg (207 lb)	1 August 1990 (aged 28)	(Finland) Lahti Pelicans
23	F	Dmitrij Jaškin	1.90 m (6 ft 3 in)	90 kg (200 lb)	23 March 1993 (aged 26)	(United States) Washington Capitals
24	D	Petr Zámorský	1.82 m (6 ft 0 in)	86 kg (190 lb)	3 August 1992 (aged 26)	(Czech Republic) Mountfield HK
26	F	Michal Řepík	1.79 m (5 ft 10 in)	87 kg (192 lb)	31 December 1988 (aged 30)	(Russia) HC Vityaz
29	D	Jan Kolář	1.90 m (6 ft 3 in)	92 kg (203 lb)	22 November 1986 (aged 32)	(Russia) Amur Khabarovsk
30	G	Šimon Hrubec	1.86 m (6 ft 1 in)	83 kg (183 lb)	30 June 1991 (aged 27)	(Czech Republic) HC Oceláři Třinec
32	G	Patrik Bartošák	1.85 m (6 ft 1 in)	88 kg (194 lb)	29 March 1993 (aged 26)	(Czech Republic) HC Vítkovice Ridera
33	G	Pavel Francouz	1.82 m (6 ft 0 in)	81 kg (179 lb)	3 June 1990 (aged 28)	(United States) Colorado Avalanche
43	F	Jan Kovář	1.81 m (5 ft 11 in)	98 kg (216 lb)	20 March 1990 (aged 29)	(Czech Republic) HC Škoda Plzeň
44	D	Jan Rutta	1.90 m (6 ft 3 in)	90 kg (200 lb)	29 July 1990 (aged 28)	(United States) Tampa Bay Lightning
67	F	Michael Frolík – A	1.86 m (6 ft 1 in)	89 kg (196 lb)	17 February 1988 (aged 31)	(Canada) Calgary Flames
72	F	Filip Chytil	1.84 m (6 ft 0 in)	81 kg (179 lb)	5 September 1999 (aged 19)	(United States) New York Rangers
77	F	Milan Gulaš	1.80 m (5 ft 11 in)	87 kg (192 lb)	30 December 1985 (aged 33)	(Czech Republic) HC Škoda Plzeň
79	F	Tomáš Zohorna	1.85 m (6 ft 1 in)	95 kg (209 lb)	3 January 1988 (aged 31)	(Russia) Amur Khabarovsk
81	F	Dominik Kubalík	1.87 m (6 ft 2 in)	86 kg (190 lb)	21 August 1995 (aged 23)	(Switzerland) HC Ambrì-Piotta
93	F	Jakub Voráček – C	1.89 m (6 ft 2 in)	97 kg (214 lb)	15 August 1989 (aged 29)	(United States) Philadelphia Flyers
94	F	Radek Faksa	1.91 m (6 ft 3 in)	96 kg (212 lb)	9 January 1994 (aged 25)	(United States) Dallas Stars

=== Italy ===
The roster was announced on 1 May 2019.

Head coach: Clayton Beddoes

No.	Pos.	Name	Height	Weight	Birthdate	Team
1	G	Andreas Bernard	1.83 m (6 ft 0 in)	80 kg (180 lb)	9 June 1990 (aged 28)	(Germany) Adler Mannheim
3	F	Markus Gander	1.88 m (6 ft 2 in)	90 kg (200 lb)	16 May 1989 (aged 29)	(Italy) HC Pustertal Wölfe
5	D	Alex Trivellato – C	1.89 m (6 ft 2 in)	83 kg (183 lb)	5 January 1993 (aged 26)	(Germany) Krefeld Pinguine
6	D	Sean McMonagle	1.85 m (6 ft 1 in)	88 kg (194 lb)	19 January 1988 (aged 31)	(Norway) Frisk Asker Ishockey
7	D	Jan Pavlu	1.89 m (6 ft 2 in)	85 kg (187 lb)	16 September 1994 (aged 24)	(Germany) Heilbronner Falken
8	F	Marco Insam – A	1.88 m (6 ft 2 in)	92 kg (203 lb)	5 June 1989 (aged 29)	(Italy) HC Bozen–Bolzano
9	D	Armin Hofer	1.84 m (6 ft 0 in)	90 kg (200 lb)	19 March 1987 (aged 32)	(Italy) HC Pustertal Wölfe
12	D	Ivan Tauferer	1.90 m (6 ft 3 in)	93 kg (205 lb)	26 January 1995 (aged 24)	(Italy) Ritten Sport
13	F	Peter Hochkofler	1.90 m (6 ft 3 in)	90 kg (200 lb)	4 October 1994 (aged 24)	(Austria) EC Red Bull Salzburg
16	F	Giovanni Morini	1.87 m (6 ft 2 in)	90 kg (200 lb)	2 February 1995 (aged 24)	(Switzerland) HC Lugano
19	F	Raphael Andergassen	1.77 m (5 ft 10 in)	73 kg (161 lb)	16 June 1993 (aged 25)	(Italy) HC Pustertal Wölfe
22	F	Diego Kostner	1.83 m (6 ft 0 in)	82 kg (181 lb)	5 August 1992 (aged 26)	(Switzerland) HC Ambrì-Piotta
23	F	Simon Kostner	1.72 m (5 ft 8 in)	77 kg (170 lb)	30 November 1990 (aged 28)	(Italy) Ritten Sport
25	D	Stefano Marchetti	1.81 m (5 ft 11 in)	83 kg (183 lb)	10 November 1986 (aged 32)	(Italy) HC Bozen–Bolzano
26	D	Armin Helfer – A	1.86 m (6 ft 1 in)	97 kg (214 lb)	31 May 1980 (aged 38)	(Italy) HC Pustertal Wölfe
30	G	Marco De Filippo	1.78 m (5 ft 10 in)	77 kg (170 lb)	2 September 1990 (aged 28)	(Italy) SG Cortina
35	G	Gianluca Vallini	1.82 m (6 ft 0 in)	78 kg (172 lb)	27 October 1993 (aged 25)	(Italy) EV Bozen 84
46	F	Ivan Deluca	1.93 m (6 ft 4 in)	100 kg (220 lb)	28 August 1997 (aged 21)	(Italy) HC Bozen–Bolzano
47	F	Joachim Ramoser	1.78 m (5 ft 10 in)	90 kg (200 lb)	22 February 1995 (aged 24)	(Germany) ERC Ingolstadt
55	D	Luca Zanatta	1.85 m (6 ft 1 in)	90 kg (200 lb)	31 May 1989 (aged 29)	(Switzerland) EHC Olten
63	F	Alex Lambacher	1.91 m (6 ft 3 in)	90 kg (200 lb)	7 October 1996 (aged 22)	(Germany) Heilbronner Falken
81	F	Anthony Bardaro	1.78 m (5 ft 10 in)	82 kg (181 lb)	8 September 1992 (aged 26)	(Italy) Asiago Hockey 1935
88	F	Tommaso Traversa	1.71 m (5 ft 7 in)	77 kg (170 lb)	4 August 1990 (aged 28)	(Italy) HC Pustertal Wölfe
91	F	Marco Rosa	1.82 m (6 ft 0 in)	84 kg (185 lb)	15 January 1982 (aged 37)	(Italy) Asiago Hockey 1935
94	F	Angelo Miceli	1.78 m (5 ft 10 in)	80 kg (180 lb)	3 January 1994 (aged 25)	(Italy) HC Bozen–Bolzano

=== Latvia ===
A 26-player roster was announced on 30 April 2019.

Head coach: Bob Hartley

No.	Pos.	Name	Height	Weight	Birthdate	Team
10	F	Lauris Dārziņš – C	1.91 m (6 ft 3 in)	91 kg (201 lb)	28 January 1985 (aged 34)	(Latvia) Dinamo Riga
11	D	Kristaps Sotnieks – A	1.83 m (6 ft 0 in)	94 kg (207 lb)	29 January 1987 (aged 32)	(Latvia) Dinamo Riga
12	F	Rihards Marenis	1.85 m (6 ft 1 in)	91 kg (201 lb)	18 April 1993 (aged 26)	(Latvia) HK Mogo
14	F	Rihards Bukarts – A	1.80 m (5 ft 11 in)	84 kg (185 lb)	31 December 1995 (aged 23)	(Germany) Schwenninger Wild Wings
17	F	Mārtiņš Dzierkals	1.83 m (6 ft 0 in)	84 kg (185 lb)	4 April 1997 (aged 22)	(Latvia) Dinamo Riga
18	F	Rodrigo Ābols	1.93 m (6 ft 4 in)	93 kg (205 lb)	5 January 1996 (aged 23)	(Sweden) Örebro HK
21	F	Rūdolfs Balcers	1.80 m (5 ft 11 in)	79 kg (174 lb)	8 April 1997 (aged 22)	(Canada) Ottawa Senators
23	F	Teodors Bļugers	1.86 m (6 ft 1 in)	84 kg (185 lb)	15 August 1994 (aged 24)	(United States) Pittsburgh Penguins
26	D	Uvis Balinskis	1.82 m (6 ft 0 in)	84 kg (185 lb)	1 August 1996 (aged 22)	(Latvia) Dinamo Riga
27	D	Oskars Cibuļskis	1.88 m (6 ft 2 in)	97 kg (214 lb)	9 April 1988 (aged 31)	(Czech Republic) Mountfield HK
29	D	Ralfs Freibergs	1.81 m (5 ft 11 in)	82 kg (181 lb)	17 May 1991 (aged 27)	(Czech Republic) PSG Berani Zlín
30	G	Elvis Merzļikins	1.91 m (6 ft 3 in)	87 kg (192 lb)	13 April 1994 (aged 25)	(United States) Columbus Blue Jackets
31	G	Gustavs Grigals	1.88 m (6 ft 2 in)	89 kg (196 lb)	22 July 1998 (aged 20)	(United States) Univ. of Alaska Fairbanks
32	D	Artūrs Kulda	1.88 m (6 ft 2 in)	96 kg (212 lb)	25 July 1988 (aged 30)	(Russia) Severstal Cherepovets
49	F	Emīls Ģēģeris	1.84 m (6 ft 0 in)	85 kg (187 lb)	23 July 1999 (aged 19)	(Latvia) Dinamo Riga
50	G	Kristers Gudļevskis	1.92 m (6 ft 4 in)	96 kg (212 lb)	31 July 1992 (aged 26)	(Latvia) Dinamo Riga
58	D	Guntis Galviņš	1.87 m (6 ft 2 in)	98 kg (216 lb)	25 January 1986 (aged 33)	(Czech Republic) HC Oceláři Třinec
70	F	Miks Indrašis	1.93 m (6 ft 4 in)	85 kg (187 lb)	30 September 1990 (aged 28)	(Russia) HC Dynamo Moscow
71	F	Roberts Bukarts	1.82 m (6 ft 0 in)	84 kg (185 lb)	27 June 1990 (aged 28)	(Czech Republic) HC Sparta Praha
72	D	Jānis Jaks	1.83 m (6 ft 0 in)	86 kg (190 lb)	22 August 1995 (aged 23)	(United States) American International College
77	D	Kristaps Zīle	1.85 m (6 ft 1 in)	86 kg (190 lb)	24 December 1997 (aged 21)	(Latvia) Dinamo Riga
87	F	Gints Meija	1.85 m (6 ft 1 in)	91 kg (201 lb)	4 September 1987 (aged 31)	(Latvia) Dinamo Riga
91	F	Ronalds Ķēniņš	1.82 m (6 ft 0 in)	91 kg (201 lb)	28 February 1991 (aged 28)	(Switzerland) Lausanne HC
95	F	Oskars Batņa	1.95 m (6 ft 5 in)	106 kg (234 lb)	7 July 1995 (aged 23)	(Latvia) Dinamo Riga
96	F	Māris Bičevskis	1.80 m (5 ft 11 in)	83 kg (183 lb)	3 August 1991 (aged 27)	(Czech Republic) Mountfield HK

=== Norway ===
The roster was announced on 2 May 2019.

Head coach: Petter Thoresen

No.	Pos.	Name	Height	Weight	Birthdate	Team
4	D	Johannes Johannesen	1.81 m (5 ft 11 in)	85 kg (187 lb)	1 March 1997 (aged 22)	(Norway) Stavanger Oilers
5	D	Erlend Lesund	1.90 m (6 ft 3 in)	93 kg (205 lb)	11 December 1994 (aged 24)	(Sweden) Mora IK
6	D	Jonas Holøs – C	1.80 m (5 ft 11 in)	93 kg (205 lb)	27 August 1987 (aged 31)	(Switzerland) HC Fribourg-Gottéron
8	F	Mathias Trettenes	1.79 m (5 ft 10 in)	76 kg (168 lb)	8 November 1993 (aged 25)	(Germany) Krefeld Pinguine
10	D	Mattias Nørstebø	1.78 m (5 ft 10 in)	82 kg (181 lb)	3 June 1995 (aged 23)	(Sweden) Frölunda HC
13	F	Sondre Olden	1.94 m (6 ft 4 in)	84 kg (185 lb)	29 August 1992 (aged 26)	(Austria) Vienna Capitals
15	F	Tommy Kristiansen	1.89 m (6 ft 2 in)	98 kg (216 lb)	26 May 1989 (aged 29)	(Norway) Sparta Warriors
17	D	Stefan Espeland	1.84 m (6 ft 0 in)	84 kg (185 lb)	24 March 1989 (aged 30)	(Norway) Vålerenga Ishockey
18	F	Tobias Lindström	1.77 m (5 ft 10 in)	92 kg (203 lb)	20 April 1988 (aged 31)	(Norway) Vålerenga Ishockey
21	D	Christian Bull	1.86 m (6 ft 1 in)	90 kg (200 lb)	13 August 1996 (aged 22)	(Norway) Storhamar Ishockey
22	F	Martin Røymark	1.84 m (6 ft 0 in)	86 kg (190 lb)	10 November 1986 (aged 32)	(Norway) Vålerenga Ishockey
26	F	Kristian Forsberg	1.85 m (6 ft 1 in)	88 kg (194 lb)	5 May 1986 (aged 33)	(Norway) Stavanger Oilers
27	F	Andreas Martinsen	1.90 m (6 ft 3 in)	100 kg (220 lb)	3 June 1995 (aged 23)	(United States) Chicago Blackhawks
28	F	Niklas Roest	1.74 m (5 ft 9 in)	80 kg (180 lb)	3 August 1986 (aged 32)	(Norway) Sparta Warriors
31	G	Jonas Arntzen	1.89 m (6 ft 2 in)	85 kg (187 lb)	1 March 1997 (aged 22)	(Sweden) Leksands IF
33	G	Henrik Haukeland	1.86 m (6 ft 1 in)	83 kg (183 lb)	6 December 1994 (aged 24)	(Finland) HC TPS
38	G	Henrik Holm	1.85 m (6 ft 1 in)	80 kg (180 lb)	6 September 1990 (aged 28)	(Norway) Stavanger Oilers
41	F	Patrick Thoresen – A	1.80 m (5 ft 11 in)	92 kg (203 lb)	7 November 1983 (aged 35)	(Norway) Storhamar Ishockey
46	F	Mathis Olimb – A	1.77 m (5 ft 10 in)	79 kg (174 lb)	1 February 1986 (aged 33)	(Sweden) Skellefteå AIK
47	D	Alexander Bonsaksen	1.80 m (5 ft 11 in)	84 kg (185 lb)	24 January 1987 (aged 32)	(Finland) KooKoo
49	D	Christian Kåsastul	1.76 m (5 ft 9 in)	88 kg (194 lb)	9 April 1997 (aged 22)	(Norway) Frisk Asker Ishockey
51	F	Mats Rosseli Olsen	1.80 m (5 ft 11 in)	82 kg (181 lb)	29 April 1991 (aged 28)	(Sweden) Frölunda HC
61	F	Alexander Reichenberg	1.85 m (6 ft 1 in)	81 kg (179 lb)	13 June 1992 (aged 26)	(Sweden) Färjestad BK
85	F	Michael Haga	1.80 m (5 ft 11 in)	77 kg (170 lb)	10 March 1992 (aged 27)	(Sweden) Mora IK
93	F	Thomas Valkvæ Olsen	1.86 m (6 ft 1 in)	88 kg (194 lb)	18 May 1993 (aged 25)	(Sweden) Leksands IF

=== Russia ===
A 30-player roster was announced on 29 April 2019. The roster was cut down to 27 on 8 May 2019.

Head coach: Ilya Vorobiev

No.	Pos.	Name	Height	Weight	Birthdate	Team
2	D	Artyom Zub	1.88 m (6 ft 2 in)	90 kg (200 lb)	3 October 1995 (aged 23)	(Russia) SKA Saint Petersburg
3	D	Dinar Khafizullin	1.81 m (5 ft 11 in)	84 kg (185 lb)	1 May 1989 (aged 30)	(Russia) SKA Saint Petersburg
4	D	Vladislav Gavrikov	1.90 m (6 ft 3 in)	97 kg (214 lb)	21 November 1995 (aged 23)	(United States) Columbus Blue Jackets
7	F	Ivan Telegin	1.93 m (6 ft 4 in)	92 kg (203 lb)	28 February 1992 (aged 27)	(Russia) HC CSKA Moscow
8	F	Alexander Ovechkin – A	1.90 m (6 ft 3 in)	94 kg (207 lb)	17 September 1985 (aged 33)	(United States) Washington Capitals
9	D	Dmitry Orlov	1.82 m (6 ft 0 in)	92 kg (203 lb)	23 July 1991 (aged 27)	(United States) Washington Capitals
11	F	Evgeni Malkin – A	1.90 m (6 ft 3 in)	84 kg (185 lb)	31 July 1986 (aged 32)	(United States) Pittsburgh Penguins
13	F	Sergei Andronov	1.88 m (6 ft 2 in)	86 kg (190 lb)	19 July 1989 (aged 29)	(Russia) HC CSKA Moscow
15	F	Artyom Anisimov	1.93 m (6 ft 4 in)	86 kg (190 lb)	24 May 1988 (aged 30)	(United States) Chicago Blackhawks
16	F	Sergei Plotnikov	1.88 m (6 ft 2 in)	90 kg (200 lb)	3 June 1990 (aged 28)	(Russia) SKA Saint Petersburg
22	D	Nikita Zaitsev	1.89 m (6 ft 2 in)	89 kg (196 lb)	29 October 1991 (aged 27)	(Canada) Toronto Maple Leafs
25	F	Mikhail Grigorenko	1.89 m (6 ft 2 in)	95 kg (209 lb)	16 May 1994 (aged 24)	(Russia) HC CSKA Moscow
31	G	Ilya Sorokin	1.88 m (6 ft 2 in)	78 kg (172 lb)	4 August 1995 (aged 23)	(Russia) HC CSKA Moscow
40	G	Alexandar Georgiev	1.86 m (6 ft 1 in)	82 kg (181 lb)	10 February 1996 (aged 23)	(United States) New York Rangers
61	D	Nikita Zadorov	1.96 m (6 ft 5 in)	104 kg (229 lb)	16 April 1995 (aged 24)	(United States) Colorado Avalanche
63	F	Evgenii Dadonov	1.80 m (5 ft 11 in)	84 kg (185 lb)	12 March 1989 (aged 30)	(United States) Florida Panthers
71	F	Ilya Kovalchuk – C	1.90 m (6 ft 3 in)	100 kg (220 lb)	15 April 1983 (aged 36)	(United States) Los Angeles Kings
77	F	Kirill Kaprizov	1.78 m (5 ft 10 in)	87 kg (192 lb)	26 April 1997 (aged 22)	(Russia) HC CSKA Moscow
86	F	Nikita Kucherov	1.80 m (5 ft 11 in)	77 kg (170 lb)	17 June 1993 (aged 25)	(United States) Tampa Bay Lightning
88	G	Andrei Vasilevskiy	1.90 m (6 ft 3 in)	90 kg (200 lb)	25 July 1994 (aged 24)	(United States) Tampa Bay Lightning
89	D	Nikita Nesterov	1.80 m (5 ft 11 in)	83 kg (183 lb)	28 March 1993 (aged 26)	(Russia) HC CSKA Moscow
92	F	Evgeny Kuznetsov	1.82 m (6 ft 0 in)	83 kg (183 lb)	19 May 1992 (aged 26)	(United States) Washington Capitals
94	F	Alexander Barabanov	1.79 m (5 ft 10 in)	89 kg (196 lb)	17 June 1994 (aged 24)	(Russia) SKA Saint Petersburg
97	F	Nikita Gusev	1.78 m (5 ft 10 in)	76 kg (168 lb)	8 July 1992 (aged 26)	(United States) Vegas Golden Knights
98	D	Mikhail Sergachev	1.90 m (6 ft 3 in)	98 kg (216 lb)	25 June 1998 (aged 20)	(United States) Tampa Bay Lightning

=== Sweden ===
A 18-player roster was announced on 30 April 2019. The final roster was revealed on 6 May 2019.

Head coach: Rikard Grönborg

No.	Pos.	Name	Height	Weight	Birthdate	Team
1	G	Jhonas Enroth	1.80 m (5 ft 11 in)	78 kg (172 lb)	25 June 1988 (aged 30)	(Sweden) Örebro HK
3	D	John Klingberg	1.88 m (6 ft 2 in)	82 kg (181 lb)	14 August 1992 (aged 26)	(United States) Dallas Stars
6	D	Adam Larsson	1.91 m (6 ft 3 in)	93 kg (205 lb)	12 November 1992 (aged 26)	(Canada) Edmonton Oilers
8	D	Robert Hägg	1.88 m (6 ft 2 in)	94 kg (207 lb)	8 February 1995 (aged 24)	(United States) Philadelphia Flyers
9	F	Adrian Kempe	1.87 m (6 ft 2 in)	85 kg (187 lb)	13 September 1996 (aged 22)	(United States) Los Angeles Kings
10	F	Alexander Wennberg	1.86 m (6 ft 1 in)	85 kg (187 lb)	22 September 1994 (aged 24)	(United States) Columbus Blue Jackets
14	D	Mattias Ekholm – A	1.93 m (6 ft 4 in)	98 kg (216 lb)	24 May 1990 (aged 28)	(United States) Nashville Predators
16	F	Marcus Krüger	1.83 m (6 ft 0 in)	84 kg (185 lb)	27 May 1990 (aged 28)	(United States) Chicago Blackhawks
18	D	Marcus Pettersson	1.93 m (6 ft 4 in)	79 kg (174 lb)	8 May 1996 (aged 23)	(United States) Pittsburgh Penguins
21	F	Loui Eriksson	1.88 m (6 ft 2 in)	89 kg (196 lb)	17 July 1985 (aged 33)	(Canada) Vancouver Canucks
23	D	Oliver Ekman-Larsson – C	1.88 m (6 ft 2 in)	91 kg (201 lb)	17 July 1991 (aged 27)	(United States) Arizona Coyotes
25	G	Jacob Markström	1.98 m (6 ft 6 in)	89 kg (196 lb)	31 January 1990 (aged 29)	(Canada) Vancouver Canucks
28	F	Elias Lindholm	1.85 m (6 ft 1 in)	87 kg (192 lb)	2 December 1994 (aged 24)	(Canada) Calgary Flames
29	F	Mario Kempe	1.83 m (6 ft 0 in)	85 kg (187 lb)	19 September 1988 (aged 30)	(United States) Arizona Coyotes
30	G	Henrik Lundqvist	1.85 m (6 ft 1 in)	85 kg (187 lb)	2 March 1982 (aged 37)	(United States) New York Rangers
32	F	Oskar Lindblom	1.86 m (6 ft 1 in)	87 kg (192 lb)	15 August 1996 (aged 22)	(United States) Philadelphia Flyers
40	F	Elias Pettersson	1.88 m (6 ft 2 in)	80 kg (180 lb)	12 November 1998 (aged 20)	(Canada) Vancouver Canucks
52	D	Philip Holm	1.87 m (6 ft 2 in)	88 kg (194 lb)	8 December 1991 (aged 27)	(Russia) Torpedo Nizhny Novgorod
56	D	Erik Gustafsson	1.86 m (6 ft 1 in)	90 kg (200 lb)	14 March 1992 (aged 27)	(United States) Chicago Blackhawks
58	F	Anton Lander	1.83 m (6 ft 0 in)	85 kg (187 lb)	24 April 1991 (aged 28)	(Russia) Ak Bars Kazan
63	F	Jesper Bratt	1.79 m (5 ft 10 in)	81 kg (179 lb)	30 July 1998 (aged 20)	(United States) New Jersey Devils
70	F	Dennis Rasmussen	1.91 m (6 ft 3 in)	91 kg (201 lb)	3 July 1990 (aged 28)	(Russia) Metallurg Magnitogorsk
72	F	Patric Hörnqvist – A	1.82 m (6 ft 0 in)	86 kg (190 lb)	1 January 1987 (aged 32)	(United States) Pittsburgh Penguins
88	F	William Nylander	1.83 m (6 ft 0 in)	86 kg (190 lb)	1 May 1996 (aged 23)	(Canada) Toronto Maple Leafs
92	F	Gabriel Landeskog	1.85 m (6 ft 1 in)	98 kg (216 lb)	23 November 1992 (aged 26)	(United States) Colorado Avalanche

=== Switzerland ===
A 29-player roster was announced on 28 April 2019. The final roster was revealed on 4 May 2019.

Head coach: Patrick Fischer

No.	Pos.	Name	Height	Weight	Birthdate	Team
6	D	Yannick Weber	1.81 m (5 ft 11 in)	91 kg (201 lb)	23 September 1988 (aged 30)	(United States) Nashville Predators
8	F	Vincent Praplan	1.83 m (6 ft 0 in)	86 kg (190 lb)	10 June 1994 (aged 24)	(United States) Springfield Thunderbirds
10	F	Andres Ambühl	1.76 m (5 ft 9 in)	85 kg (187 lb)	14 September 1983 (aged 35)	(Switzerland) HC Davos
13	F	Nico Hischier	1.86 m (6 ft 1 in)	79 kg (174 lb)	4 January 1999 (aged 20)	(United States) New Jersey Devils
15	F	Grégory Hofmann	1.82 m (6 ft 0 in)	80 kg (180 lb)	13 November 1992 (aged 26)	(Switzerland) HC Lugano
16	D	Raphael Diaz – C	1.81 m (5 ft 11 in)	88 kg (194 lb)	9 January 1986 (aged 33)	(Switzerland) EV Zug
20	G	Reto Berra	1.94 m (6 ft 4 in)	99 kg (218 lb)	3 January 1987 (aged 32)	(Switzerland) HC Fribourg-Gottéron
21	F	Kevin Fiala	1.80 m (5 ft 11 in)	87 kg (192 lb)	22 July 1996 (aged 22)	(United States) Minnesota Wild
22	F	Nino Niederreiter	1.88 m (6 ft 2 in)	98 kg (216 lb)	8 September 1992 (aged 26)	(United States) Carolina Hurricanes
23	F	Philipp Kurashev	1.82 m (6 ft 0 in)	87 kg (192 lb)	12 October 1999 (aged 19)	(Canada) Quebec Remparts
29	G	Robert Mayer	1.85 m (6 ft 1 in)	91 kg (201 lb)	9 October 1989 (aged 29)	(Switzerland) Genève-Servette HC
38	D	Lukas Frick	1.88 m (6 ft 2 in)	88 kg (194 lb)	15 September 1994 (aged 24)	(Switzerland) HC Lausanne
45	D	Michael Fora	1.89 m (6 ft 2 in)	94 kg (207 lb)	30 October 1995 (aged 23)	(Switzerland) HC Ambri-Piotta
46	F	Noah Rod	1.84 m (6 ft 0 in)	88 kg (194 lb)	7 June 1996 (aged 22)	(Switzerland) Genève-Servette HC
55	D	Romain Loeffel	1.78 m (5 ft 10 in)	85 kg (187 lb)	10 March 1991 (aged 28)	(Switzerland) HC Lugano
60	F	Tristan Scherwey	1.76 m (5 ft 9 in)	80 kg (180 lb)	7 May 1991 (aged 28)	(Switzerland) SC Bern
63	G	Leonardo Genoni	1.82 m (6 ft 0 in)	87 kg (192 lb)	28 August 1987 (aged 31)	(Switzerland) SC Bern
64	F	Christoph Bertschy	1.78 m (5 ft 10 in)	84 kg (185 lb)	5 April 1994 (aged 25)	(Switzerland) HC Lausanne
76	D	Joël Genazzi	1.85 m (6 ft 1 in)	90 kg (200 lb)	10 February 1988 (aged 31)	(Switzerland) HC Lausanne
82	F	Simon Moser – A	1.87 m (6 ft 2 in)	95 kg (209 lb)	10 March 1989 (aged 30)	(Switzerland) SC Bern
85	F	Sven Andrighetto	1.78 m (5 ft 10 in)	85 kg (187 lb)	21 March 1993 (aged 26)	(United States) Colorado Avalanche
86	D	Janis Jérôme Moser	1.83 m (6 ft 0 in)	72 kg (159 lb)	6 June 2000 (aged 18)	(Switzerland) EHC Biel
90	D	Roman Josi – A	1.87 m (6 ft 2 in)	91 kg (201 lb)	1 June 1990 (aged 28)	(United States) Nashville Predators
92	F	Gaëtan Haas	1.81 m (5 ft 11 in)	80 kg (180 lb)	31 January 1992 (aged 27)	(Switzerland) SC Bern
93	F	Lino Martschini	1.68 m (5 ft 6 in)	65 kg (143 lb)	21 January 1993 (aged 26)	(Switzerland) EV Zug
