= 2017 IIHF World Championship Division I =

Tournament details
- Host countries: Ukraine; United Kingdom
- Venue: 2 (in 2 host cities)
- Dates: 22–28 April (Group A); 23–29 April (Group B)
- Teams: 12

The 2017 IIHF World Championship Division I was an international ice hockey tournament run by the International Ice Hockey Federation. Group A was contested in Kyiv, Ukraine from 22 to 28 April 2017 and Group B in Belfast, United Kingdom from 23 to 29 April 2017. South Korea and Austria were promoted to the 2018 World Championship. It marked the first time South Korea had earned promotion to the top tier of the World Championship.

== Bids ==
There were two official bids to host Group A Championships.

- Austria
- Ukraine
  - Kyiv

Ukraine had never hosted these championships, however, they did host an Olympic Pre-Qualification round in 2012. The proposed arena was the Palace of Sports.

The decision on who hosts the tournament was decided on May 20, 2016. The bid from Ukraine gained a majority vote against the Austrian entry.

There were also two official bids to host Group B Championships.

- Estonia
  - Tallinn

Estonia last hosted these championships in 2006. The proposed arena was Tallinn Arena.

- United Kingdom
  - Belfast

The United Kingdom had never hosted these championships, however, they did play host to the IIHF Group B Championships in 1952, and again in 1993. The proposed arena was the Odyssey Arena.

The decision on who hosts the tournament was decided on May 20, 2016. The bid from the United Kingdom received 18 votes, whilst the Estonia bid received 7.

== Venues ==
Group A		Group B
Kyiv	2017 IIHF World Championship Division I is located in Europe	Belfast
Palace of Sports; Capacity: 7,000	2017 IIHF World Championship Division I is located in Europe	SSE Arena; Capacity: 11,000

== Group A tournament ==
2017 IIHF World Championship Division I A

Tournament details
- Host country: Ukraine
- Venue: 1 (in 1 host city)
- Dates: 22–28 April
- Teams: 6

Tournament statistics
- Games played: 15
- Goals scored: 70 (4.67 per game)
- Attendance: 51,851 (3,457 per game)
- Scoring leader: (Kazakhstan) Nigel Dawes (9 points)

Official website
- IIHF.com

=== Participants ===
Team	Qualification
Hungary	Placed 15th in the Elite Division and was relegated.
Kazakhstan	Placed 16th in the Elite Division and was relegated.
Poland	Placed 3rd in Division I A the previous year.
Austria	Placed 4th in Division I A the previous year.
South Korea	Placed 5th in Division I A the previous year.
Ukraine	Placed 1st in Division I B the previous year and was promoted.

=== Match officials ===
7 referees and 7 linesmen were selected for the tournament.

Referees

- (Latvia) Andris Ansons
- (Italy) Daniel Gamper
- (Denmark) Jacob Grumsen
- (Norway) Roy Stian Hansen
- (Sweden) Andreas Harnebring
- (Czech Republic) Vladimír Pešina
- (United States) Jeremy Tufts

Linesmen

- (United States) Riley Bowles
- (Switzerland) Franco Castelli
- (Canada) Maxime Chaput
- (Czech Republic) Daniel Hynek
- (Ukraine) Artem Korepanov
- (Italy) Ulrich Pardatscher
- (Sweden) Daniel Persson

=== Standings ===
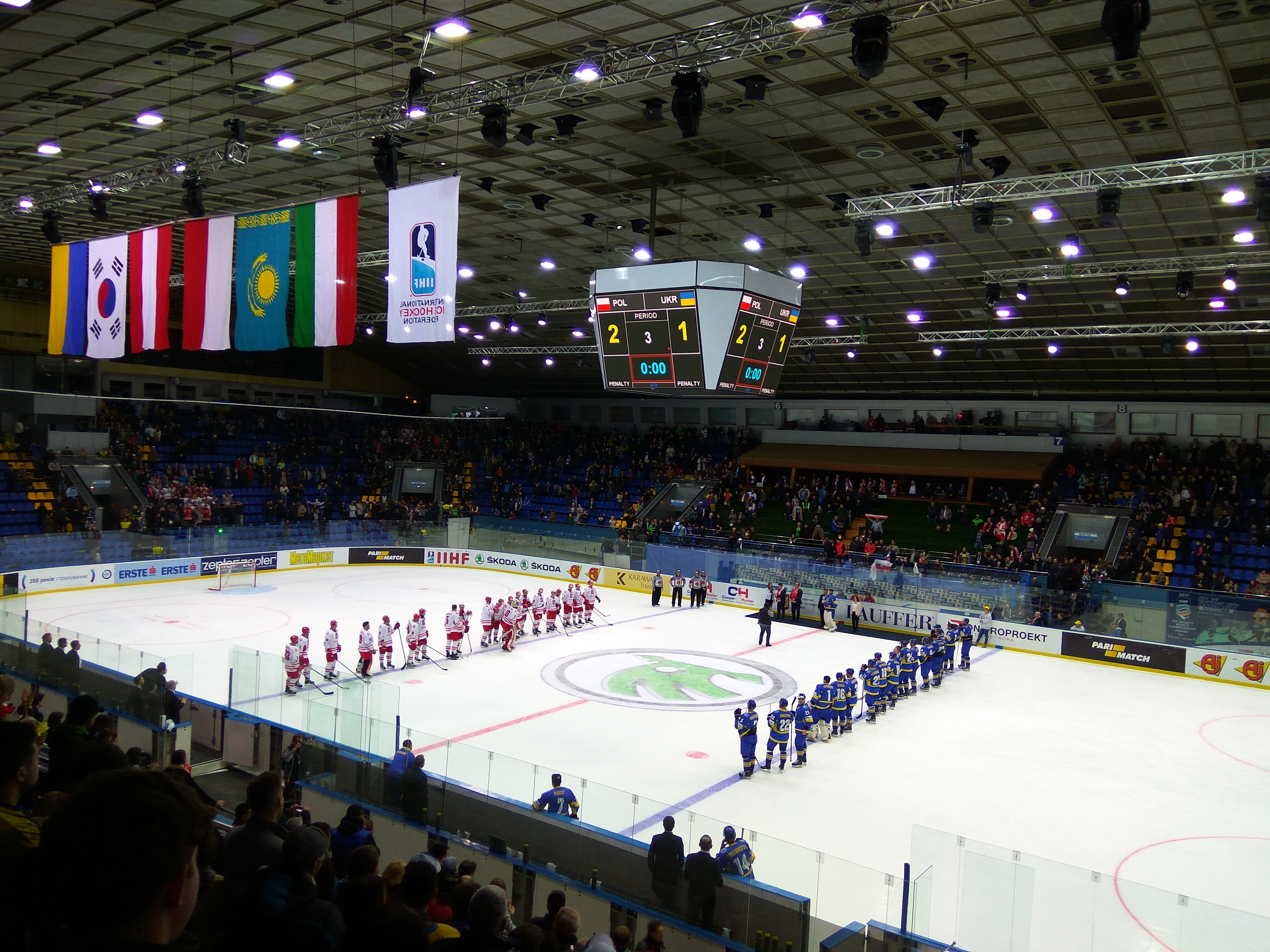
Poland - Ukraine

Pos	Team	Pld	W	OTW	OTL	L	GF	GA	GD	Pts	Qualification or relegation
1	Austria (P)	5	4	0	0	1	22	4	+18	12	2018 IIHF World Championship
2	South Korea (P)	5	3	1	0	1	14	11	+3	11 (Note: Kazakhstan 2–5 South Korea)	2018 IIHF World Championship
3	Kazakhstan	5	3	1	0	1	13	10	+3	11	
4	Poland	5	2	0	1	2	6	17	−11	7	
5	Hungary	5	1	0	0	4	8	14	−6	3	
6	Ukraine (H, R)	5	0	0	1	4	7	14	−7	1	Relegation to 2018 Division I B

Source: IIHF
Rules for classification: 1) points; 2) head-to-head points; 3) head-to-head goal difference; 4) head-to-head number of goals scored; 5) result against closest best-ranked team outside tied teams; 6) result against second-best ranked team outside tied teams; 7) seeding before tournament.
(H) Host; (P) Promoted; (R) Relegated

=== Results ===
All times are local (UTC+3).

22 April 2017; 13:30	Ukraine	3–5 (1–1, 2–1, 0–3)	Hungary	Palace of Sports, Kyiv; Attendance: 4,612

Game reference

Eduard Zakharchenko
Goalies
Miklós Rajna
Referees:
(Denmark) Jacob Grumsen
(Norway) Roy Stian Hansen
Linesmen:
(United States) Riley Bowles
(Sweden) Daniel Persson

Kuzmik – 13:48	1–0
	1–1	14:35 – Bartalis (Erdély, Szirányi)
	1–2	20:20 – Vas (Szirányi)
Butsenko (Katrych) (PP) – 27:33	2–2
Butsenko (Lyalka) – 38:51	3–2
	3–3	50:41 – Sarauer (Wehrs, Kóger)
	3–4	52:53 – Dansereau (Sarauer, Wehrs)
	3–5	59:49 – Hári (Galló, Sagert) (PP, ENG)

12 min
Penalties
12 min
24
Shots
51

22 April 2017; 17:00	South Korea	4–2 (1–0, 1–1, 2–1)	Poland	Palace of Sports, Kyiv; Attendance: 2,257

Game reference

Matt Dalton
Goalies
Przemysław Odrobny
Referees:
(Latvia) Andris Ansons
(Italy) Daniel Gamper
Linesmen:
(Ukraine) Artem Korepanov
(Italy) Ulrich Pardatscher

Kim K. (Ahn) – 07:51	1–0
Sin (Park W., Kim Won-jun) – 27:07	2–0
	2–1	34:40 – Bryk (Pasiut, Wronka) (PP2)
Lee Y. (Swift) – 42:07	3–1
Kim S. – 46:02	4–1
	4–2	49:48 – Pociecha (Zapała)

10 min
Penalties
4 min
22
Shots
38

22 April 2017; 20:30	Austria	2–3 (0–2, 2–0, 0–1)	Kazakhstan	Palace of Sports, Kyiv; Attendance: 2,819

Game reference

Bernhard Starkbaum
Goalies
Vitali Kolesnik
Referees:
(Czech Republic) Vladimír Pešina
(United States) Jeremy Tufts
Linesmen:
(Switzerland) Franco Castelli
(Czech Republic) Daniel Hynek

	0–1	08:26 – Dawes (Dallman, St. Pierre) (PP)
	0–2	14:56 – Dawes (Boyd, Bochenski)
Komarek (Raffl, Schlacher) – 24:32	1–2
Raffl (Hofer, Komarek) – 37:31	2–2
	2–3	43:38 – Markelov (Savchenko, Starchenko) (PP)

16 min
Penalties
8 min
24
Shots
32

23 April 2017; 17:00	Kazakhstan	2–5 (1–1, 1–0, 0–4)	South Korea	Palace of Sports, Kyiv; Attendance: 2,463

Game reference

Vitali Kolesnik
Goalies
Matt Dalton
Referees:
(Denmark) Jacob Grumsen
(Norway) Roy Stian Hansen
Linesmen:
(Ukraine) Artem Korepanov
(Sweden) Daniel Persson

Bochenski (Dawes) – 08:01	1–0
	1–1	15:56 – Ahn (Kim K.)
Dawes (Bochenski, St. Pierre) – 33:25	2–1
	2–2	45:49 – Plante (Cho, Swift)
	2–3	47:03 – Shin S. (Cho, Lee D.)
	2–4	49:58 – Plante (Kim S., Ahn)
	2–5	51:41 – Kim K (Plante, Kim S.) (PP2)

31 min
Penalties
6 min
32
Shots
21

23 April 2017; 20:30	Poland	2–1 (1–0, 0–1, 1–0)	Ukraine	Palace of Sports, Kyiv; Attendance: 5,291

Game reference

Przemysław Odrobny
Goalies
Eduard Zakharchenko
Referees:
(Sweden) Andreas Harnebring
(Czech Republic) Vladimír Pešina
Linesmen:
(Switzerland) Franco Castelli
(Canada) Maxime Chaput

Malasiński (Pasiut, Wronka) (PP) – 19:56	1–0
	1–1	38:30 – Blagoy (Kuzmik)
Kapica (Kruczek, Dziubiński) – 46:34	2–1

10 min
Penalties
6 min
30
Shots
38

24 April 2017; 20:30	Hungary	1–3 (1–1, 0–0, 0–2)	Austria	Palace of Sports, Kyiv; Attendance: 2,861

Game reference

Miklós Rajna
Goalies
Bernhard Starkbaum
Referees:
(Latvia) Andris Ansons
(United States) Jeremy Tufts
Linesmen:
(United States) Riley Bowles
(Italy) Ulrich Pardatscher

	0–1	03:51 – Raffl (Komarek) (SH)
Dansereau (Erdély, Bartalis) (PP) – 06:23	1–1
	1–2	44:33 – Hofer (Schumnig, Komarek) (PP)
	1–3	47:21 – Heinrich (Komarek, Schumnig) (PP)

8 min
Penalties
8 min
29
Shots
28

25 April 2017; 13:30	Kazakhstan	1–0 OT (0–0, 0–0, 0–0); OT: (1–0)	Poland	Palace of Sports, Kyiv; Attendance: 1,536

Game reference
Vitali Kolesnik	Goalies	Przemysław Odrobny	Referees: (Norway) Roy Stian Hansen (Sweden) Andreas Harnebring; Linesmen: (Switzerland) Franco Castelli (Ukraine) Artem Korepanov
Dallman (Dawes) – 61:39 / 1–0			Referees: (Norway) Roy Stian Hansen (Sweden) Andreas Harnebring; Linesmen: (Switzerland) Franco Castelli (Ukraine) Artem Korepanov
4 min	Penalties	6 min	Referees: (Norway) Roy Stian Hansen (Sweden) Andreas Harnebring; Linesmen: (Switzerland) Franco Castelli (Ukraine) Artem Korepanov
29	Shots	30	Referees: (Norway) Roy Stian Hansen (Sweden) Andreas Harnebring; Linesmen: (Switzerland) Franco Castelli (Ukraine) Artem Korepanov

25 April 2017; 17:00	Hungary	1–3 (0–0, 1–1, 0–2)	South Korea	Palace of Sports, Kyiv; Attendance: 2,713

Game reference

Bence Bálizs
Goalies
Matt Dalton
Referees:
(Czech Republic) Vladimír Pešina
(United States) Jeremy Tufts
Linesmen:
(Canada) Maxime Chaput
(Czech Republic) Daniel Hynek

Kóger (Szirányi, Hári) (PP2) – 23:45	1–0
	1–1	35:43 – Kim K. (Kim S., Ahn)
	1–2	46:31 – Shin S. (Seo, Swift)
	1–3	55:13 – Sin

12 min
Penalties
10 min
23
Shots
33

25 April 2017; 20:30	Ukraine	0–1 (0–0, 0–1, 0–0)	Austria	Palace of Sports, Kyiv; Attendance: 5,005

Game reference
Eduard Zakharchenko	Goalies	Bernhard Starkbaum	Referees: (Italy) Daniel Gamper (Denmark) Jacob Grumsen; Linesmen: (United States) Riley Bowles (Sweden) Daniel Persson
0–1 / 35:57 – Woger (Schumnig, Hundertpfund) (PP)			Referees: (Italy) Daniel Gamper (Denmark) Jacob Grumsen; Linesmen: (United States) Riley Bowles (Sweden) Daniel Persson
18 min	Penalties	12 min	Referees: (Italy) Daniel Gamper (Denmark) Jacob Grumsen; Linesmen: (United States) Riley Bowles (Sweden) Daniel Persson
26	Shots	43	Referees: (Italy) Daniel Gamper (Denmark) Jacob Grumsen; Linesmen: (United States) Riley Bowles (Sweden) Daniel Persson

26 April 2017; 20:30	Kazakhstan	4–2 (2–0, 0–2, 2–0)	Ukraine	Palace of Sports, Kyiv; Attendance: 4,806

Game reference

Vitali Kolesnik
Goalies
Bogdan Dyachenko
Referees:
(Latvia) Andris Ansons
(Italy) Daniel Gamper
Linesmen:
(Czech Republic) Daniel Hynek
(Italy) Ulrich Pardatscher

Dawes (Semyonov, Bochenski) – 03:21	1–0
St. Pierre (Bochenski, Boyd) (PP) – 19:59	2–0
	2–1	34:25 – Nimenko (Pobiedonostsev, Lyalka)
	2–2	35:16 – Babynets (Katrych, Varyvoda)
Mikhalis (Starchenko) – 41:59	3–2
Bochenski (Dawes, Stepavnov) (PP) – 57:04	4–2

8 min
Penalties
10 min
47
Shots
22

27 April 2017; 17:00	Poland	2–0 (0–0, 2–0, 0–0)	Hungary	Palace of Sports, Kyiv; Attendance: 2,874

Game reference
Przemysław Odrobny	Goalies	Bence Bálizs	Referees: (Italy) Daniel Gamper (United States) Jeremy Tufts; Linesmen: (Switzerland) Franco Castelli (Czech Republic) Daniel Hynek
Zapała (Malasiński, Bryk) – 25:01 / 1–0; Malasiński (SH) – 25:50 / 2–0			Referees: (Italy) Daniel Gamper (United States) Jeremy Tufts; Linesmen: (Switzerland) Franco Castelli (Czech Republic) Daniel Hynek
14 min	Penalties	16 min	Referees: (Italy) Daniel Gamper (United States) Jeremy Tufts; Linesmen: (Switzerland) Franco Castelli (Czech Republic) Daniel Hynek
27	Shots	25	Referees: (Italy) Daniel Gamper (United States) Jeremy Tufts; Linesmen: (Switzerland) Franco Castelli (Czech Republic) Daniel Hynek

27 April 2017; 20:30	Austria	5–0 (3–0, 1–0, 1–0)	South Korea	Palace of Sports, Kyiv; Attendance: 3,511

Game reference

Bernhard Starkbaum
Goalies
Matt Dalton
Park Sung-je
Referees:
(Sweden) Andreas Harnebring
(Czech Republic) Vladimír Pešina
Linesmen:
(Canada) Maxime Chaput
(Italy) Ulrich Pardatscher

Haudum – 12:09	1–0
Lebler (Ganahl, Hundertpfund) – 12:57	2–0
Heinrich (Lebler, Ganahl) – 16:26	3–0
Komarek (Heinrich, Raffl) – 24:36	4–0
Strong (Schlacher) – 49:09	5–0

4 min
Penalties
6 min
36
Shots
25

28 April 2017; 13:30	Hungary	1–3 (1–2, 0–0, 0–1)	Kazakhstan	Palace of Sports, Kyiv; Attendance: 2,323

Game reference

Miklós Rajna
Goalies
Vitali Kolesnik
Referees:
(Sweden) Andreas Harnebring
(Czech Republic) Vladimír Pešina
Linesmen:
(Canada) Maxime Chaput
(Czech Republic) Daniel Hynek

	0–1	02:48 – Dallman (Dawes, Boyd)
	0–2	10:25 – Mikhalis (Sagadeyev)
Sagert (Galló) (PP) – 17:34	1–2
	1–3	59:47 – Dawes (Bochenski) (ENG)

8 min
Penalties
10 min
32
Shots
27

28 April 2017; 17:00	Poland	0–11 (0–3, 0–4, 0–4)	Austria	Palace of Sports, Kyiv; Attendance: 3,453

Game reference

Przemysław Odrobny
Rafał Radziszewski
Goalies
Bernhard Starkbaum
Referees:
(Norway) Roy Stian Hansen
(United States) Jeremy Tufts
Linesmen:
(United States) Riley Bowles
(Ukraine) Artem Korepanov

0–1	01:44 – M. Ulmer
0–2	07:01 – Lebler (Komarek, Hofer)
0–3	10:02 – Hofer (Raffl, Schumnig)
0–4	28:36 – Raffl (Heinrich, Schumnig) (PP)
0–5	29:07 – Haudum (S. Ulmer, Kirchschlager)
0–6	35:39 – Komarek (Hofer, Schumnig)
0–7	39:51 – Komarek (Haudum)
0–8	46:52 – Strong
0–9	48:27 – Haudum (Heinrich)
0–10	50:31 – Lebler (Hundertpfund, Kirchschlager)
0–11	55:20 – Lebler

4 min
Penalties
8 min
26
Shots
30

28 April 2017; 20:30	South Korea	2–1 GWS (0–0, 1–1, 0–0) (OT 0–0) (SO: 1–0)	Ukraine	Palace of Sports, Kyiv; Attendance: 5,327

Game reference
Matt Dalton	Goalies	Eduard Zakharchenko	Referees: (Latvia) Andris Ansons (Denmark) Jacob Grumsen; Linesmen: (Switzerland) Franco Castelli (Sweden) Daniel Persson
Ahn (Sin, Park W.) – 24:59 / 1–0; / 1–1 / 33:24 – Babynets			Referees: (Latvia) Andris Ansons (Denmark) Jacob Grumsen; Linesmen: (Switzerland) Franco Castelli (Sweden) Daniel Persson
Swift; Cho (miss); Shin S.	Shootout	(miss) Butsenko; (miss) Lyalka	Referees: (Latvia) Andris Ansons (Denmark) Jacob Grumsen; Linesmen: (Switzerland) Franco Castelli (Sweden) Daniel Persson
6 min	Penalties	6 min	Referees: (Latvia) Andris Ansons (Denmark) Jacob Grumsen; Linesmen: (Switzerland) Franco Castelli (Sweden) Daniel Persson
37	Shots	23	Referees: (Latvia) Andris Ansons (Denmark) Jacob Grumsen; Linesmen: (Switzerland) Franco Castelli (Sweden) Daniel Persson

=== Awards and statistics ===
==== Awards ====
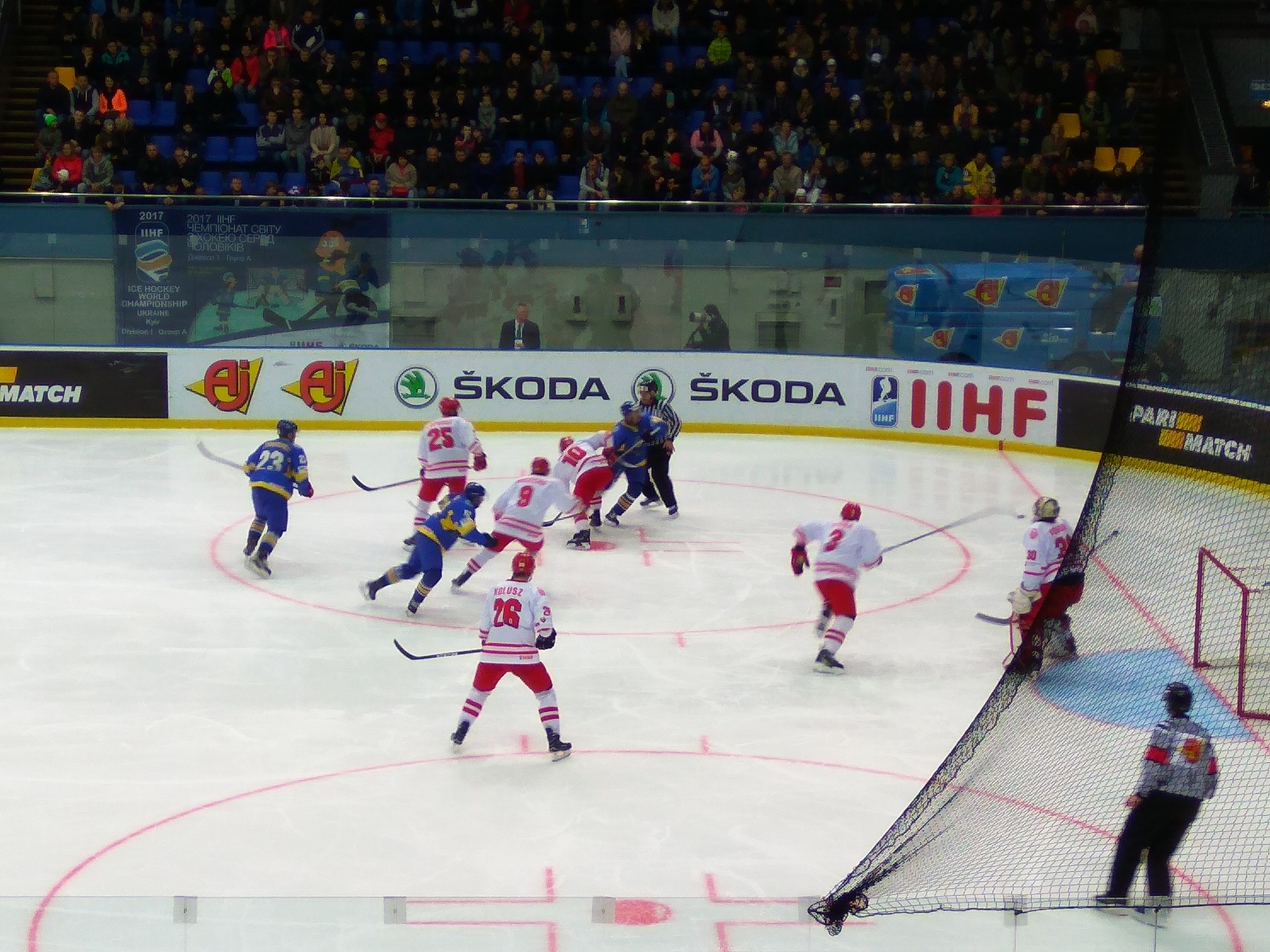
The match between Poland and Ukraine. Poland won the game 2–1.

- Best players selected by the directorate:
  - Best Goalkeeper: (Austria) Bernhard Starkbaum
  - Best Defenseman: (Austria) Dominique Heinrich
  - Best Forward: (Kazakhstan) Nigel Dawes

Source: IIHF.com

- Media All-Stars:
  - MVP: (Austria) Thomas Raffl
  - Goalkeeper: (Austria) Bernhard Starkbaum
  - Defenceman: (Austria) Dominique Heinrich / (South Korea) Alex Plante
  - Forwards: (Kazakhstan) Nigel Dawes / (Austria) Thomas Raffl / (Austria) Konstantin Komarek

Source: IIHF.com

==== Scoring leaders ====
List shows the top skaters sorted by points, then goals.

Player	GP	G	A	Pts	+/−	PIM	POS
(Kazakhstan) Nigel Dawes	5	5	4	9	+5	0	F
(Austria) Konstantin Komarek	5	4	5	9	+10	0	F
(Kazakhstan) Brandon Bochenski	5	2	5	7	+3	4	F
(Austria) Thomas Raffl	5	3	3	6	+6	2	F
(Austria) Martin Schumnig	5	0	6	6	+8	0	D
(Austria) Brian Lebler	5	4	1	5	+7	4	F
(South Korea) Ahn Jin-hui	5	2	3	5	+5	0	F
(Austria) Dominique Heinrich	5	2	3	5	+12	0	D
(Austria) Fabio Hofer	5	2	3	5	+7	2	F
(Austria) Lukas Haudum	5	3	1	4	+5	2	F
(South Korea) Kim Ki-sung	5	3	1	4	+3	2	F

GP = Games played; G = Goals; A = Assists; Pts = Points; +/− = Plus/minus; PIM = Penalties in minutes; POS = Position
Source: IIHF.com

==== Goaltending leaders ====
Only the top five goaltenders, based on save percentage, who have played at least 40% of their team's minutes, are included in this list.

Player	TOI	GA	GAA	SA	Sv%	SO
(Austria) Bernhard Starkbaum	299:05	4	0.80	137	97.08	3
(Ukraine) Eduard Zakharchenko	242:32	9	2.23	158	94.30	0
(Poland) Przemysław Odrobny	260:42	9	2.07	124	92.74	1
(South Korea) Matt Dalton	269:36	10	2.23	133	92.48	0
(Kazakhstan) Vitali Kolesnik	301:39	10	1.99	128	92.19	1

TOI = Time on ice (minutes:seconds); SA = Shots against; GA = Goals against; GAA = Goals against average; Sv% = Save percentage; SO = Shutouts
Source: IIHF.com

== Group B tournament ==
2017 IIHF World Championship Division I B

Tournament details
- Host country: United Kingdom
- Venue: 1 (in 1 host city)
- Dates: 23–29 April
- Teams: 6

Tournament statistics
- Games played: 15
- Goals scored: 103 (6.87 per game)
- Attendance: 21,208 (1,414 per game)
- Scoring leader: (Japan) Daisuke Obara (10 points)

Official website
- IIHF.com

=== Participants ===
Team	Qualification
Japan	Placed 6th in Division I A and was relegated.
Great Britain	Host, Placed 2nd in Division I B the previous year.
Lithuania	Placed 3rd in Division I B the previous year.
Croatia	Placed 4th in Division I B the previous year.
Estonia	Placed 5th in Division I B the previous year.
Netherlands	Placed 1st in Division II A the previous year and was promoted.

=== Match officials ===
4 referees and 7 linesmen were selected for the tournament.

Referees

- (France) Geoffrey Barcelo
- (Hungary) Gergely Kincses
- (Austria) Kristijan Nikolic
- (Slovenia) Milan Zrnić

Linesmen

- (United Kingdom) Ally Flockhart
- (United Kingdom) James Kavanagh
- (Hungary) Márton Németh
- (Austria) David Nothegger
- (Poland) Mariusz Smura
- (Kazakhstan) Vladimir Suslov
- (Russia) Alexander Sysuev

=== Standings ===
Pos	Team	Pld	W	OTW	OTL	L	GF	GA	GD	Pts	Qualification or relegation
1	Great Britain (H, P)	5	5	0	0	0	32	5	+27	15	Promoted to 2018 Division I A
2	Japan	5	4	0	0	1	22	11	+11	12	
3	Lithuania	5	3	0	0	2	18	12	+6	9	
4	Estonia	5	2	0	0	3	11	20	−9	6	
5	Croatia	5	1	0	0	4	14	17	−3	3	
6	Netherlands (R)	5	0	0	0	5	6	38	−32	0	Relegation to 2018 Division II A

Source: IIHF
Rules for classification: 1) points; 2) head-to-head points; 3) head-to-head goal difference; 4) head-to-head number of goals scored; 5) result against closest best-ranked team outside tied teams; 6) result against second-best ranked team outside tied teams; 7) seeding before tournament.
(H) Host; (P) Promoted; (R) Relegated

=== Results ===
All times are local (UTC+1).

23 April 2017; 12:30	Netherlands	1–6 (0–2, 1–2, 0–2)	Japan	Odyssey, Belfast; Attendance: 943

Game reference

Fabian Schotel
Goalies
Yutaka Fukufuji
Referee:
(Slovenia) Milan Zrnic
Linesmen:
(United Kingdom) Ally Flockhart
(Hungary) Márton Németh

	0–1	05:21 – H. Sato (Furuhashi, Takagi)
	0–2	13:59 – Takagi (Furuhashi, Ushu)
	0–3	24:15 – Furuhashi (Takagi, Ushu)
	0–4	32:31 – Obara (Ueno, Haga)
Mason (Bruijsten, Van Haren) (PP) – 37:02	1–4
	1–5	41:39 – Obara (Ueno, Hirano)
	1–6	57:20 – Ueno (Obara, Minoshima)

4 min
Penalties
12 min
21
Shots
39

23 April 2017; 16:00	Croatia	2–4 (0–1, 1–0, 1–3)	Great Britain	Odyssey, Belfast; Attendance: 1,830

Game reference

Mate Tomljenović
Goalies
Ben Bowns
Referee:
(Hungary) Gergely Kincses
Linesmen:
(Austria) David Nothegger
(Russia) Alexander Sysuev

	0–1	15:30 – Dowd (Richardson, Farmer) (PP)
Blagus (Brine, Perkovich) (PP) – 28:17	1–1
	1–2	43:46 – Clarke (Peacock, Dowd)
	1–3	46:45 – Mosey (Dowd)
Brine (Rendulić, Sertich) (PP2) – 54:25	2–3
	2–4	58:56 – Cowley (Lachowicz, J. Phillips)

10 min
Penalties
16 min
32
Shots
35

23 April 2017; 19:30	Estonia	0–3 (0–1, 0–2, 0–0)	Lithuania	Odyssey, Belfast; Attendance: 914

Game reference

Villem-Henrik Koitmaa
Goalies
Artur Pavliukov
Referee:
(Slovenia) Milan Zrnic
Linesmen:
(United Kingdom) James Kavanagh
(Poland) Mariusz Smura

0–1	14:28 – Rulevičius (Gintautas)
0–2	30:18 – Bendžius (Verenis)
0–3	37:56 – Čižas (Pliskauskas, Bosas)

16 min
Penalties
12 min
13
Shots
33

24 April 2017; 12:30	Japan	4–2 (2–0, 1–0, 1–2)	Croatia	Odyssey, Belfast; Attendance: 351

Game reference

Yutaka Fukufuji
Goalies
Vilim Rosandić
Referee:
(France) Geoffrey Barcelo
Linesmen:
(United Kingdom) James Kavanagh
(Kazakhstan) Vladimir Suslov

Koizumi (Iwatsuki, Terao) – 08:40	1–0
S. Sato (Tanaka, H. Sato) (PP) – 16:40	2–0
Tanaka (S. Sato, Hashimoto) (PP) – 26:41	3–0
	3–1	45:36 – Sertich (Brine, Vedlin) (PP)
Hirano (Minoshima, Haga) – 46:57	4–1
	4–2	58:39 – Sertich (Rendulić, Perkovich) (PP2)

16 min
Penalties
24 min
31
Shots
31

24 April 2017; 16:00	Lithuania	8–0 (2–0, 4–0, 2–0)	Netherlands	Odyssey, Belfast; Attendance: 519

Game reference

Artur Pavliukov
Simas Baltrūnas
Goalies
Sjoerd Idzenga
Fabian Schotel
Referee:
(Hungary) Gergely Kincses
Linesmen:
(United Kingdom) Ally Flockhart
(Austria) David Nothegger

Čypas (Rybakov, Bendžius) – 03:27	1–0
Rulevičius (Bogdziul, Protcenko) – 14:27	2–0
Čižas (Bosas, Pliskauskas) – 30:45	3–0
Krakauskas (Kaleinikovas, Cetvertak) – 34:48	4–0
Rybakov (Čypas, Verenis) – 35:26	5–0
Pliskauskas (Čižas, Protcenko) – 36:08	6–0
Bendžius (Verenis, Protcenko) – 42:35	7–0
Gintautas (Protcenko, Rulevičius) – 53:52	8–0

2 min
Penalties
10 min
48
Shots
25

24 April 2017; 19:30	Great Britain	5–1 (2–0, 0–1, 3–0)	Estonia	Odyssey, Belfast; Attendance: 1,437

Game reference

Stephen Murphy
Goalies
Villem-Henrik Koitmaa
Referee:
(Austria) Kristijan Nikolic
Linesmen:
(Hungary) Márton Németh
(Poland) Mariusz Smura

Garside (Clarke) – 04:38	1–0
D. Phillips (Myers, Shields) – 19:19	2–0
	2–1	29:20 – Andrejev (Lahesalu, Makrov) (PP)
Stewart (Lee, Brooks) – 41:16	3–1
Clarke (Lee, Dowd) – 44:02	4–1
Mosey (Myers, Garside) – 44:28	5–1

10 min
Penalties
6 min
43
Shots
22

26 April 2017; 12:30	Japan	6–2 (1–0, 3–1, 2–1)	Estonia	Odyssey, Belfast; Attendance: 575

Game reference

Yutaka Fukufuji
Takuto Onoda
Goalies
Roman Šumihhin
Referee:
(Austria) Kristijan Nikolic
Linesmen:
(United Kingdom) James Kavanagh
(Austria) David Nothegger

Obara (Haga, Ueno) (PP) – 19:06	1–0
Minoshima (Hirano, Obara) – 20:43	2–0
Obara (Ueno, Hirano) (PP) – 31:48	3–0
Nakajima (H. Sato) – 33:29	4–0
	4–1	34:26 – Embrich (Rooba, Makrov)
	4–2	41:55 – Vasjonkin (Parras, Sorokin)
Ueno (Hirano, Obara) – 42:49	5–2
Tanaka (Terao, Hashimoto) – 44:13	6–2

31 min
Penalties
35 min
31
Shots
30

26 April 2017; 16:00	Netherlands	2–6 (0–4, 1–1, 1–1)	Croatia	Odyssey, Belfast; Attendance: 703

Game reference

Fabian Schotel
Sjoerd Idzenga
Goalies
Mate Tomljenović
Referee:
(Slovenia) Milan Zrnic
Linesmen:
(United Kingdom) Ally Flockhart
(Poland) Mariusz Smura

	0–1	01:59 – Janković (Kanaet, Ljubić)
	0–2	13:29 – Rendulić (Blagus, Jačmenjak) (PP)
	0–3	13:41 – Miličić
	0–4	13:50 – Jarčov (Brine, Perkovich)
	0–5	21:35 – Blagus (Rendulić)
Van der Schuit (Melissant, Verschuren) – 37:25	1–5
Van der Schuit (Mason, Hermens) (PP2) – 55:25	2–5
	2–6	58:33 – Rendulić (Šakić) (SH)

16 min
Penalties
8 min
25
Shots
47

26 April 2017; 19:30	Great Britain	5–2 (4–1, 0–0, 1–1)	Lithuania	Odyssey, Belfast; Attendance: 1,787

Game reference

Ben Bowns
Goalies
Artur Pavliukov
Referee:
(France) Geoffrey Barcelo
Linesmen:
(Russia) Alexander Sysuev
(Kazakhstan) Vladimir Suslov

Shields (O'Connor, Richardson) (PP) – 01:41	1–0
	1–1	02:12 – Bosas (Pliskauskas, Kieras) (PP)
J. Phillips (Swindlehurst, Mosey) – 07:26	2–1
Mosey – 12:55	3–1
Farmer (O'Connor) (PP) – 16:15	4–1
	4–2	40:33 – Čižas (Bosas, Kieras)
O'Connor – 47:47	5–2

14 min
Penalties
8 min
38
Shots
30

28 April 2017; 12:30	Lithuania	2–6 (0–1, 2–2, 0–3)	Japan	Odyssey, Belfast; Attendance: 811

Game reference

Artur Pavliukov
Goalies
Yutaka Fukufuji
Takuto Onoda
Referee:
(Hungary) Gergely Kincses
Linesmen:
(United Kingdom) Ally Flockhart
(Russia) Alexander Sysuev

	0–1	02:23 – Furuhashi (Hirano, Obara)
Krakauskas (Kaleinikovas) – 21:52	1–1
	1–2	23:47 – Obara (Hirano)
Kaleinikovas (Katulis, Krakauskas) – 25:16	2–2
	2–3	32:50 – Takagi (Haga, Obara) (PP)
	2–4	47:13 – Nakayashiki (Iwatsuki, Nishiwaki)
	2–5	47:52 – Takagi (Ushu)
	2–6	54:51 – Tanaka (S. Sato)

16 min
Penalties
8 min
27
Shots
42

28 April 2017; 16:00	Croatia	3–4 (0–1, 3–2, 0–1)	Estonia	Odyssey, Belfast; Attendance: 922

Game reference

Mate Tomljenović
Goalies
Villem-Henrik Koitmaa
Referee:
(France) Geoffrey Barcelo
Linesmen:
(Hungary) Márton Németh
(Kazakhstan) Vladimir Suslov

	0–1	05:04 – Makrov (Lahesalu, Rooba) (PP)
Blagus (Jačmenjak, Rendulić) (PP) – 22:18	1–1
	1–2	26:45 – Rooba (Novikov, A. Petrov)
	1–3	28:06 – Sibirtsev (Andrejev, Titarenko)
Kanaet (Rendulić, Jačmenjak) – 30:25	2–3
Rendulić (Blagus) (PP) – 38:01	3–3
	3–4	40:23 – Makrov (Rooba)

4 min
Penalties
35 min
35
Shots
25

28 April 2017; 19:30	Great Britain	14–0 (3–0, 5–0, 6–0)	Netherlands	Odyssey, Belfast; Attendance: 3,005

Game reference

Stephen Murphy
Goalies
Sjoerd Idzenga
Fabian Schotel
Referee:
(Slovenia) Milan Zrnic
Linesmen:
(Austria) David Nothegger
(Poland) Mariusz Smura

Shields (O'Connor, Richardson) (PP) – 04:14	1–0
J. Phillips – 04:50	2–0
Duggan (Lachowicz) – 18:39	3–0
Brooks (Farmer) – 21:34	4–0
Peacock (Brooks, Weaver) (PP) – 31:02	5–0
Lachowicz (J. Phillips, Duggan) – 31:23	6–0
Shields (Myers) – 32:17	7–0
Duggan (Lachowicz) – 34:51	8–0
Stewart (Mosey, Shields) – 43:25	9–0
Dowd (Clarke, Weaver) (PP) – 47:23	10–0
Shields (Mosey) – 49:32	11–0
Myers (Mosey, Garside) – 53:00	12–0
Brooks (Stewart, Farmer) – 54:16	13–0
Dowd (Clarke) – 56:16	14–0

10 min
Penalties
12 min
56
Shots
11

29 April 2017; 12:30	Lithuania	3–1 (1–1, 1–0, 1–0)	Croatia	Odyssey, Belfast; Attendance: 1,343

Game reference

Artur Pavliukov
Goalies
Vilim Rosandić
Referee:
(Hungary) Gergely Kincses
Linesmen:
(Russia) Alexander Sysuev
(Kazakhstan) Vladimir Suslov

	0–1	10:18 – Mikulić (Brenčun, Mirić)
Kieras (Pliskauskas, Bosas) (PP) – 16:41	1–1
Protcenko (Aliukonis, Rybakov) – 24:23	2–1
Čižas (Bosas) – 45:13	3–1

6 min
Penalties
10 min
26
Shots
26

29 April 2017; 16:00	Estonia	4–3 (1–2, 1–1, 2–0)	Netherlands	Odyssey, Belfast; Attendance: 1,608

Game reference

Villem-Henrik Koitmaa
Goalies
Fabian Schotel
Referee:
(France) Geoffrey Barcelo
Linesmen:
(United Kingdom) James Kavanagh
(Poland) Mariusz Smura

	0–1	15:12 – Van Nes (Nagtzaam)
	0–2	16:43 – Melissant (Van der Schuit)
Rooba (Ossipov, Makrov) (PP) – 17:54	1–2
	1–3	28:40 – Bruijsten (Mason, Nagtzaam)
Rooba (Lahesalu, A. Petrov) – 37:08	2–3
A. Petrov (Makrov, Lahesalu) – 47:58	3–3
Rooba (Gornostajev, Švarõgin) – 53:38	4–3

56 min
Penalties
62 min
35
Shots
24

29 April 2017; 19:30	Japan	0–4 (0–1, 0–3, 0–0)	Great Britain	Odyssey, Belfast; Attendance: 4,460

Game reference

Yutaka Fukufuji
Goalies
Ben Bowns
Referee:
(Austria) Kristijan Nikolic
Linesmen:
(Hungary) Márton Németh
(Austria) David Nothegger

0–1	17:42 – Dowd (Farmer, O'Connor) (PP2)
0–2	24:37 – Brooks (Dowd, Clarke) (PP)
0–3	29:19 – Myers (Shields, D. Phillips)
0–4	37:55 – Myers (Mosey, Shields)

14 min
Penalties
6 min
20
Shots
38

=== Awards and statistics ===
==== Awards ====
- Best players selected by the directorate:
  - Best Goalkeeper: (Japan) Yutaka Fukufuji
  - Best Defenseman: (United Kingdom) Ben O'Connor
  - Best Forward: (United Kingdom) Colin Shields

Source: IIHF.com

==== Scoring leaders ====
List shows the top skaters sorted by points, then goals.

Player	GP	G	A	Pts	+/−	PIM	POS
(Japan) Daisuke Obara	5	5	5	10	+7	4	F
(United Kingdom) Robert Dowd	5	4	4	8	+6	4	F
(United Kingdom) Colin Shields	5	4	4	8	+9	2	F
(United Kingdom) Evan Mosey	5	3	5	8	+10	2	F
(Croatia) Borna Rendulić	5	3	5	8	+1	16	F
(Estonia) Robert Rooba	5	4	3	7	−4	25	F
(Japan) Yushiroh Hirano	5	1	6	7	+7	2	F
(United Kingdom) Matthew Myers	5	3	3	6	+6	4	F
(United Kingdom) David Clarke	5	2	4	6	+5	2	F
(Estonia) Andrei Makrov	5	2	4	6	−2	10	F
(Japan) Hiroki Ueno	5	2	4	6	+6	4	F

GP = Games played; G = Goals; A = Assists; Pts = Points; +/− = Plus/minus; PIM = Penalties in minutes; POS = Position
Source: IIHF.com

==== Goaltending leaders ====
Only the top five goaltenders, based on save percentage, who have played at least 40% of their team's minutes, are included in this list.

Player	TOI	GA	GAA	SA	Sv%	SO
(United Kingdom) Stephen Murphy	120:00	1	0.50	33	96.97	1
(United Kingdom) Ben Bowns	180:00	4	1.33	82	95.12	1
(Japan) Yutaka Fukufuji	280:04	11	2.36	140	92.14	0
(Lithuania) Artur Pavliukov	287:42	12	2.50	136	91.18	1
(Estonia) Villem-Henrik Koitmaa	234:24	14	3.58	135	89.63	0

TOI = Time on ice (minutes:seconds); SA = Shots against; GA = Goals against; GAA = Goals against average; Sv% = Save percentage; SO = Shutouts
Source: IIHF.com
