= Bence Szirányi =

Hungarian ice hockey player (born 1988)

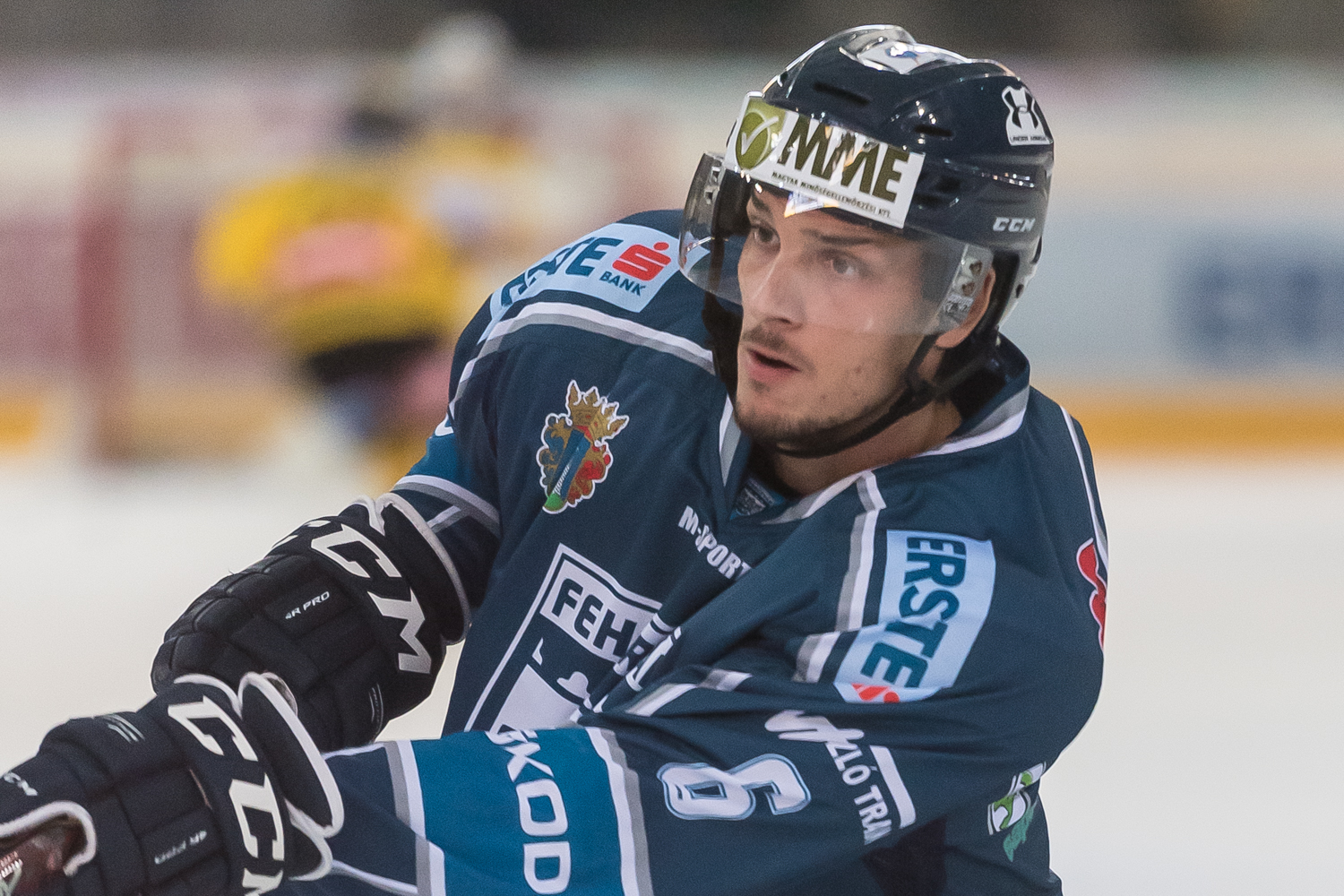
- Born: 17 February 1988 (age 38) Budapest, Hungary
- Height: 189 cm (6 ft 2 in)
- Weight: 80 kg (176 lb; 12 st 8 lb)
- Position: Defenceman
- Catches: Left
- Erste Liga team Former teams: DVTK Jegesmedvék; Újpesti TE; Budapest Stars; Briançon; Fehérvár AV19
- National team: Hungary
- Playing career: 2004–present

Bence Szirányi (born 17 February 1988) is a Hungarian professional ice hockey defenceman who plays for DVTK Jegesmedvék in the Erste Liga.
