= Thomas Hundertpfund =

Austrian ice hockey player

- Born: 14 December 1989 (age 36) Klagenfurt, Austria
- Height: 6 ft 3 in (191 cm)
- Weight: 209 lb (95 kg; 14 st 13 lb)
- Position: Left wing
- Shoots: Left
- ICEHL team Former teams: EC KAC; Timrå IK
- National team: Austria
- Playing career: 2007–present

Thomas Hundertpfund (born 14 December 1989) is an Austrian professional ice hockey left wing who currently plays for EC KAC in the ICE Hockey League (ICEHL). He previously participated in international competition for Austria and played for EC KAC in the EBEL from 2007 to 2013. Hundertpfund spent the 2013–14 season abroad in Sweden with Timrå IK of the HockeyAllsvenskan, before returning to Klagenfurt on 8 July 2014.

== Career statistics ==
=== Regular season and playoffs ===
			Regular season					Playoffs
Season	Team	League	GP	G	A	Pts	PIM	GP	G	A	Pts	PIM
2005–06	EC KAC	AUT U20	26	16	13	29	22	—	—	—	—	—
2006–07	EC KAC	AUT U20	24	12	14	26	36	—	—	—	—	—
2006–07	EC KAC	EBEL	10	0	0	0	0	—	—	—	—	—
2007–08	EC KAC	AUT U20	14	14	28	42	40	7	6	9	15	32
2007–08	EC KAC	EBEL	5	0	0	0	0	3	0	0	0	0
2008–09	EC KAC	AUT U20	10	12	12	24	8	3	0	4	4	0
2008–09	EC KAC	EBEL	37	3	5	8	12	—	—	—	—	—
2009–10	EC KAC	EBEL	54	6	9	15	34	—	—	—	—	—
2010–11	EC KAC	EBEL	46	9	15	24	28	—	—	—	—	—
2011–12	EC KAC	EBEL	49	12	14	26	55	15	2	4	6	33
2012–13	EC KAC	EBEL	47	8	13	21	29	15	3	5	8	6
2013–14	Timrå IK	Allsv	45	10	4	14	38	—	—	—	—	—
2014–15	EC KAC	EBEL	51	9	20	29	30	9	4	6	10	10
2015–16	EC KAC	EBEL	50	13	13	26	20	7	2	1	3	12
2016–17	EC KAC	EBEL	52	4	16	20	28	13	2	3	5	12
2017–18	EC KAC	EBEL	42	5	18	23	10	6	2	2	4	2
2018–19	EC KAC	EBEL	47	9	16	25	14	14	2	7	9	6
2019–20	EC KAC	EBEL	46	14	19	33	24	3	0	0	0	4
2020–21	EC KAC	ICEHL	43	9	22	31	42	15	4	6	10	14
2021–22	EC KAC	ICEHL	42	6	14	20	16	9	1	3	4	2
2022–23	EC KAC	ICEHL	44	9	13	22	18	10	2	6	8	10
2023–24	EC KAC	ICEHL	38	10	27	37	20	14	5	11	16	14
2024–25	EC KAC	ICEHL	41	15	20	35	18	17	1	7	8	24
2025–26	EC KAC	ICEHL	26	6	12	18	16	—	—	—	—	—
ICEHL totals			769	147	266	413	412	190	35	67	102	159

=== International ===
Year	Team	Event	GP	G	A	Pts	PIM
2007	Austria	WJC18 D1	5	2	0	2	4
2009	Austria	WJC D1	5	4	5	9	2
2011	Austria	WC	6	0	1	1	0
2012	Austria	WC D1A	5	1	2	3	4
2013	Austria	OGQ	3	0	1	1	4
2013	Austria	WC	7	0	5	5	10
2014	Austria	OG	4	1	0	1	2
2014	Austria	WC D1A	5	4	4	8	2
2015	Austria	WC	7	0	0	0	4
2016	Austria	OGQ	3	1	0	1	0
2017	Austria	WC D1A	5	0	3	3	4
2018	Austria	WC	7	1	0	1	2
2019	Austria	WC	6	0	0	0	2
2021	Austria	OGQ	3	0	1	1	2
Junior totals			10	6	5	11	6
Senior totals			61	8	17	25	36
