= Konstantin Komarek =

Austrian ice hockey player

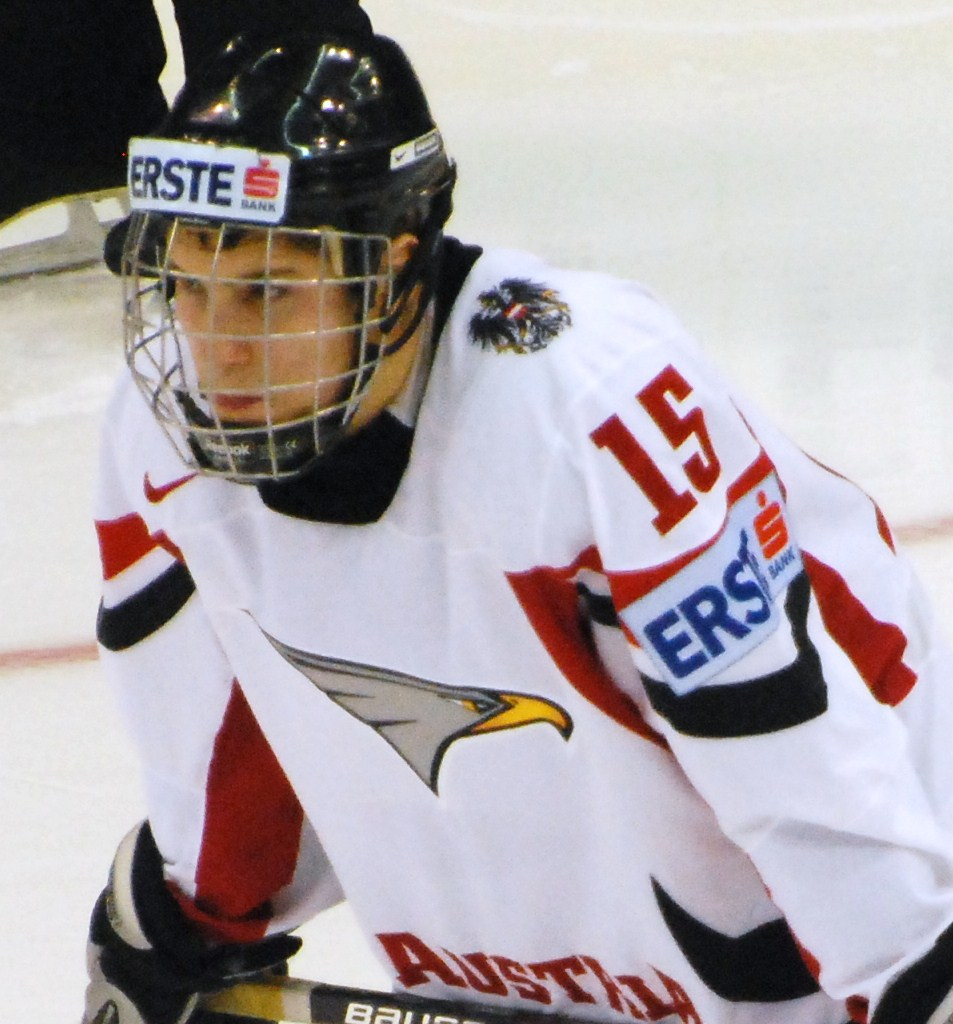
- Born: November 8, 1992 (age 33) Vienna, Austria
- Height: 6 ft 0 in (183 cm)
- Weight: 187 lb (85 kg; 13 st 5 lb)
- Position: Winger
- Shoots: Left
- SHL team Former teams: Luleå HF; EC Red Bull Salzburg; Karlskrona HK; Malmö Redhawks; Dinamo Riga; EHC Biel
- National team: Austria
- Playing career: 2010–present

Konstantin Komarek (born November 8, 1992) is an Austrian professional ice hockey winger who is currently playing with Luleå HF of the Swedish Hockey League (SHL).

== Playing career ==
Komarek made his Swedish Elite League debut with Luleå HF during the 2010–11 season. He also played for Luleå's under-20 and under-18 teams in Sweden. Internationally, Komarek has represented Austria at the under-18 and under-20 levels, mostly at the Division 1 level. In 2010, Komarek represented Austria at the top level 2010 World Junior Ice Hockey Championships, held in Regina, Saskatchewan. Komarek was eligible for the 2011 NHL entry draft. He was ranked 55th among European skaters by the NHL's Central Scouting Bureau in their final rankings. In April 2011, he signed a new one-year deal with Luleå.

After four seasons in the Austrian Hockey League with EC Red Bull Salzburg, Komarek returned to Sweden as a free agent, agreeing to a one-year deal with the Malmö Redhawks of the SHL on April 13, 2016.

On 26 May 2018, it was announced he will play the 2018–19 season for the Malmö Redhawks.

Komarek enjoyed four seasons in the SHL in his second stint in Sweden before leaving as a free agent to sign a one-year contract with Latvian based KHL club, Dinamo Riga, on 3 August 2020.

On December 10, 2020, Komarek joined EHC Biel of the National League (NL) on a one-month contract through December 2020. He made his debut with Biel the next day against HC Davos. His contract was extended through the end of January 2021 on December 24, 2020, after having scored 3 goals in 5 games.
