= Steven Strong (ice hockey) =

Austrian ice hockey player

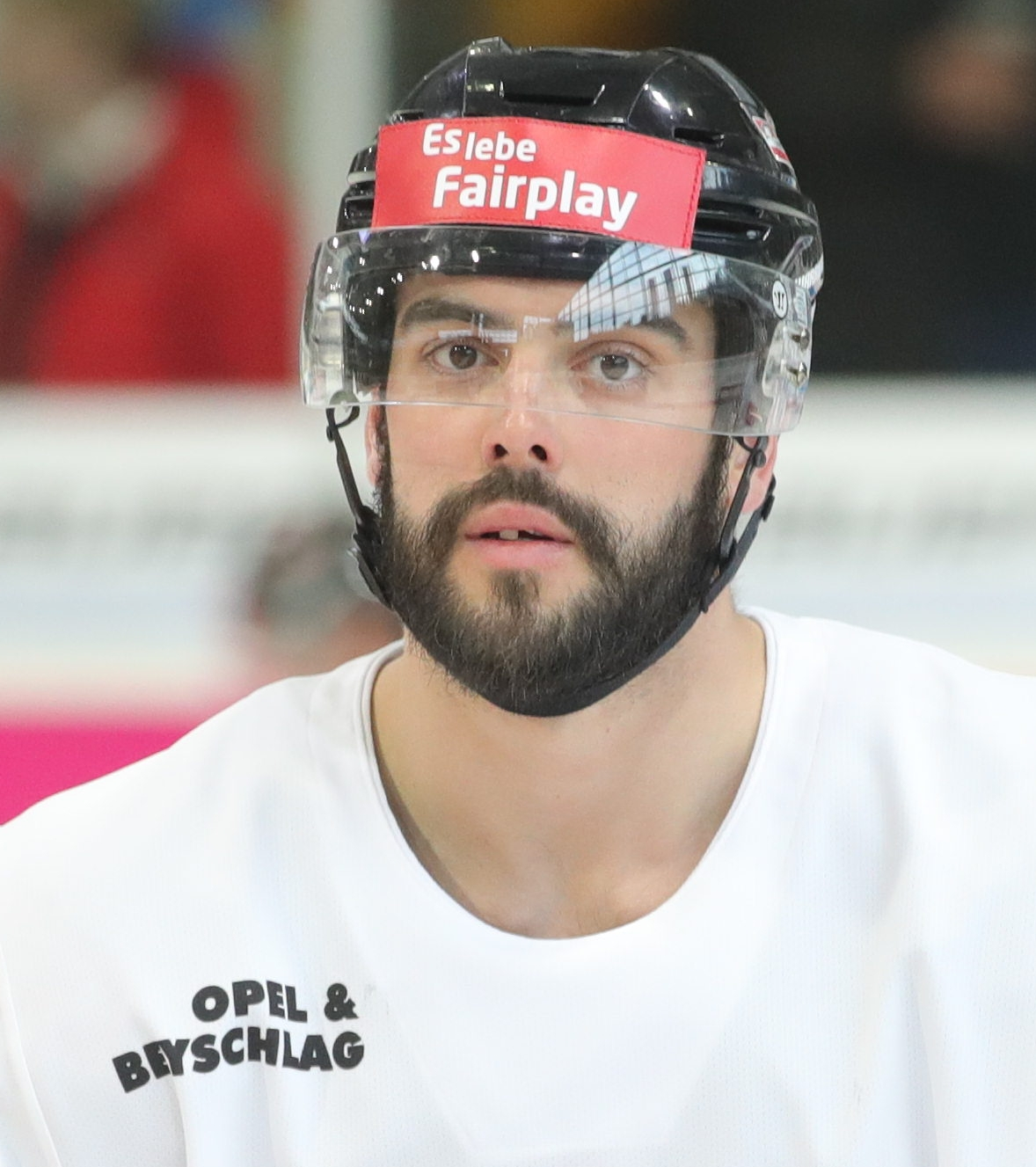
- Born: 16 February 1993 (age 32); Villach, Austria
- Height: 1.83 m (6 ft 0 in)
- Weight: 87 kg (192 lb; 13 st 10 lb)
- Position: Defence
- Shoots: Left
- ICEHL team: EC KAC
- National team: Austria
- NHL draft: Undrafted
- Playing career: 2015–present

Steven Strong (born 16 February 1993) is an Austrian ice hockey player for EC KAC in the ICE Hockey League (ICEHL) and the Austrian national team.

He represented Austria at the 2019 IIHF World Championship.

== Early life ==
He is the son of Canadian-born ice hockey player Ken Strong and a woman from Villach. At the time of his birth, his father played for EC VSV.
