= Matthew Myers (ice hockey) =

Ice hockey player

- Born: 6 November 1984 (age 41) Cardiff, Wales
- Height: 1.89 m (6 ft 2 in)
- Weight: 93 kg (205 lb; 14 st 9 lb)
- Position: Forward
- Shot: Right
- Played for: Cardiff Devils; Swindon Lynx; Bakersfield Condors; Johnstown Chiefs; Sheffield Steelers; Cardiff Devils; Nottingham Panthers; Pingouins de Morzine-Avoriaz
- Current Erste Liga coach: CSM Corona Brașov (associate)
- Coached for: Cardiff Devils
- National team: Great Britain
- NHL draft: Undrafted
- Playing career: 2001–2024

Matthew Myers (born 6 November 1984) is a Welsh retired ice hockey player who is currently associate head coach for Romanian side CSM Corona Brasov. Myers was previously an assistant coach of the Cardiff Devils.

He represented Great Britain at the 2019 IIHF World Championship, 2021 IIHF World Championship and 2022 IIHF World Championship. Myers also passed 100 senior caps for Great Britain at the World Championships in May 2021.

== Career statistics ==
			Regular season					Playoffs
Season	Team	League	GP	G	A	Pts	PIM	GP	G	A	Pts	PIM
2001-02	Cardiff Devils	BNL	32	5	3	8	8	-	-	-	-	-
2002-03	Cardiff Devils	BNL	30	5	4	9	24	10	0	0	0	0
	Swindon Lynx	EPIHL	5	5	0	5	14	-	-	-	-	-
2003-04	Cardiff Devils	EIHL	52	5	7	12	48	4	1	2	3	6
2004-05	Nottingham Panthers	EIHL	29	0	9	9	28	10	2	8	10	4
2005-06	Nottingham Panthers	EIHL	42	5	3	8	40	6	3	2	5	12
2006-07	Nottingham Panthers	EIHL	49	6	18	24	95	4	0	0	0	28
2007-08	Nottingham Panthers	EIHL	54	6	19	25	66	2	1	1	2	2
2008-09	Nottingham Panthers "A"	EIHL	44	12	29	41	73	4	1	2	3	8
2009-10	Bakersfield Condors	ECHL	6	1	2	3	8	-	-	-	-	-
	Johnstown Chiefs	ECHL	22	2	3	5	31	-	-	-	-	-
2010-11	Nottingham Panthers	EIHL	51	18	39	57	99	4	2	3	5	8
2011-12	Nottingham Panthers	EIHL	52	17	27	44	34	3	1	3	4	2
2012-13	Nottingham Panthers "A"	EIHL	52	15	24	39	60	4	3	0	3	6
2013-14	Cardiff Devils	EIHL	49	10	19	29	115	-	-	-	-	-
2014-15	Cardiff Devils "A"	EIHL	37	14	14	28	40	2	0	1	1	2
2015-16	Nottingham Panthers "A"	EIHL	52	12	17	29	39	4	0	0	0	2
2016-17	Cardiff Devils "A"	EIHL	52	9	13	22	53	4	0	0	0	0
2017-18	Cardiff Devils "A"	EIHL	56	9	15	24	26	4	0	2	2	2
2018-19	Cardiff Devils	EIHL	60	4	8	12	24	4	1	3	4	0
2019-20	Cardiff Devils "A"	EIHL	45	7	10	17	40	-	-	-	-	-
2020-21	Sheffield Steelers	Elite Series	16	1	3	4	8	N/A	N/A	N/A	N/A	N/A
2021-22	Nottingham Panthers "A"	EIHL	54	14	22	36	45	2	1	0	1	0
2022-23	Nottingham Panthers "C"	EIHL	54	9	18	27	12	4	2	0	2	2
2023-24	Pingouins de Morzine-Avoriaz "A"	FFHG Division 1	26	9	8	17	18	6	4	4	8	7
Career Totals			764	159	289	448	860	41	10	15	25	60
