= Fabio Hofer =

Austrian ice hockey player

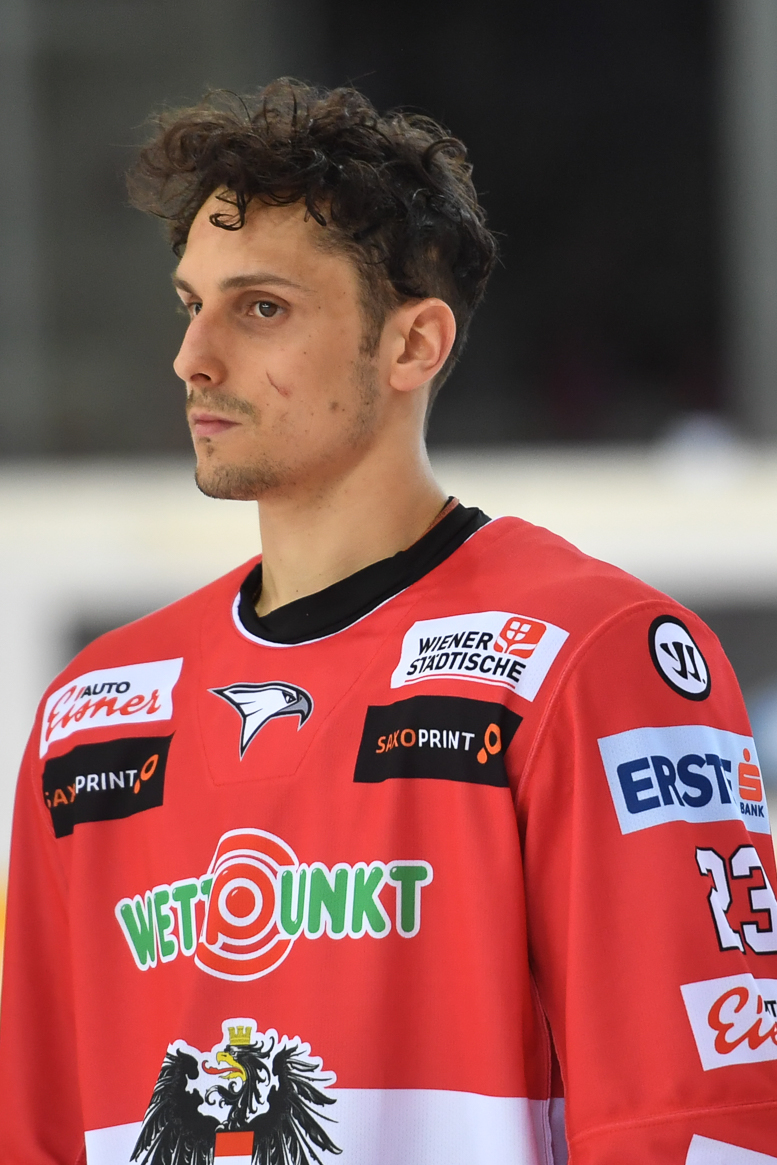
- Born: 23 January 1991 (age 35) Lustenau, Austria
- Height: 5 ft 7 in (170 cm)
- Weight: 165 lb (75 kg; 11 st 11 lb)
- Position: Centre
- Shoots: Right
- NL team Former teams: EHC Biel; EC Red Bull Salzburg; EHC Black Wings Linz; HC Ambrì-Piotta
- National team: Austria
- Playing career: 2010–present

Fabio Hofer (born 23 January 1991) is an Austrian professional ice hockey centre playing for EHC Biel of the National League (NL). Hofer plays in Switzerland with a Swiss player-license.

He has previously played in the NL with HC Ambrì-Piotta, he originally played in the Austrian Hockey League (EBEL) with EC Red Bull Salzburg and EHC Black Wings Linz.
