= Robert Farmer (ice hockey) =

British ice hockey player

- Born: 21 March 1991 (age 34) Long Eaton, Nottingham, England
- Height: 1.90 m (6 ft 3 in)
- Weight: 94 kg (207 lb; 14 st 11 lb)
- Position: Forward
- Shoots: Left
- NIHL 1 team Former teams: Whitley Warriors; Sheffield Scimitars; Sheffield Spartans; Coventry Blaze; Glasgow Clan; Alaska Aces; Nottingham Panthers; Lausitzer Füchse Whitley Warriors
- National team: Great Britain
- NHL draft: Undrafted
- Playing career: 2006–present

Robert Farmer (born 21 March 1991) is a British ice hockey player for Whitley Warriors in the UK NIHL 1 and the British national team. Farmer previously played for Nottingham Panthers.

== Career ==
Farmer represented Great Britain at the 2019 IIHF World Championship. In July 2019, he embarked on his second spell abroad by signing for Lausitzer Füchse of the DEL2, reuniting with his former Nottingham head coach Corey Neilson and GB teammate Mike Hammond.

In 2021, Farmer agreed to join Whitley Warriors for the 2021–22 season.
