= Evan Mosey =

British ice hockey player (born 1989)

- Born: 17 March 1989 (age 36) Downers Grove, Illinois, U.S.
- Height: 1.80 m (5 ft 11 in)
- Weight: 84 kg (185 lb; 13 st 3 lb)
- Position: Defence, forward
- Shoots: Right
- EIHL team Former teams: Cardiff Devils; HYC Herentals; Nottingham Panthers; Rockford IceHogs; Indy Fuel; Herning Blue Fox; Rapaces de Gap; EHC Freiburg; Sheffield Steelers
- National team: Great Britain
- NHL draft: Undrafted
- Playing career: 2013–present

Evan Mosey (born 17 March 1989) is an American-born British ice hockey player for UK Elite Ice Hockey League (EIHL) side Cardiff Devils and the British national team.

He represented Great Britain at the 2019 IIHF World Championship, 2022 IIHF World Championship, and the 2024 IIHF World Championship.

Mosey has previously played for HYC Herentals, Nottingham Panthers, Rockford IceHogs, Indy Fuel, Herning Blue Fox, Rapaces de Gap, EHC Freiburg and Sheffield Steelers.
