= Lukas Haudum =

Austrian ice hockey player (born 1997)

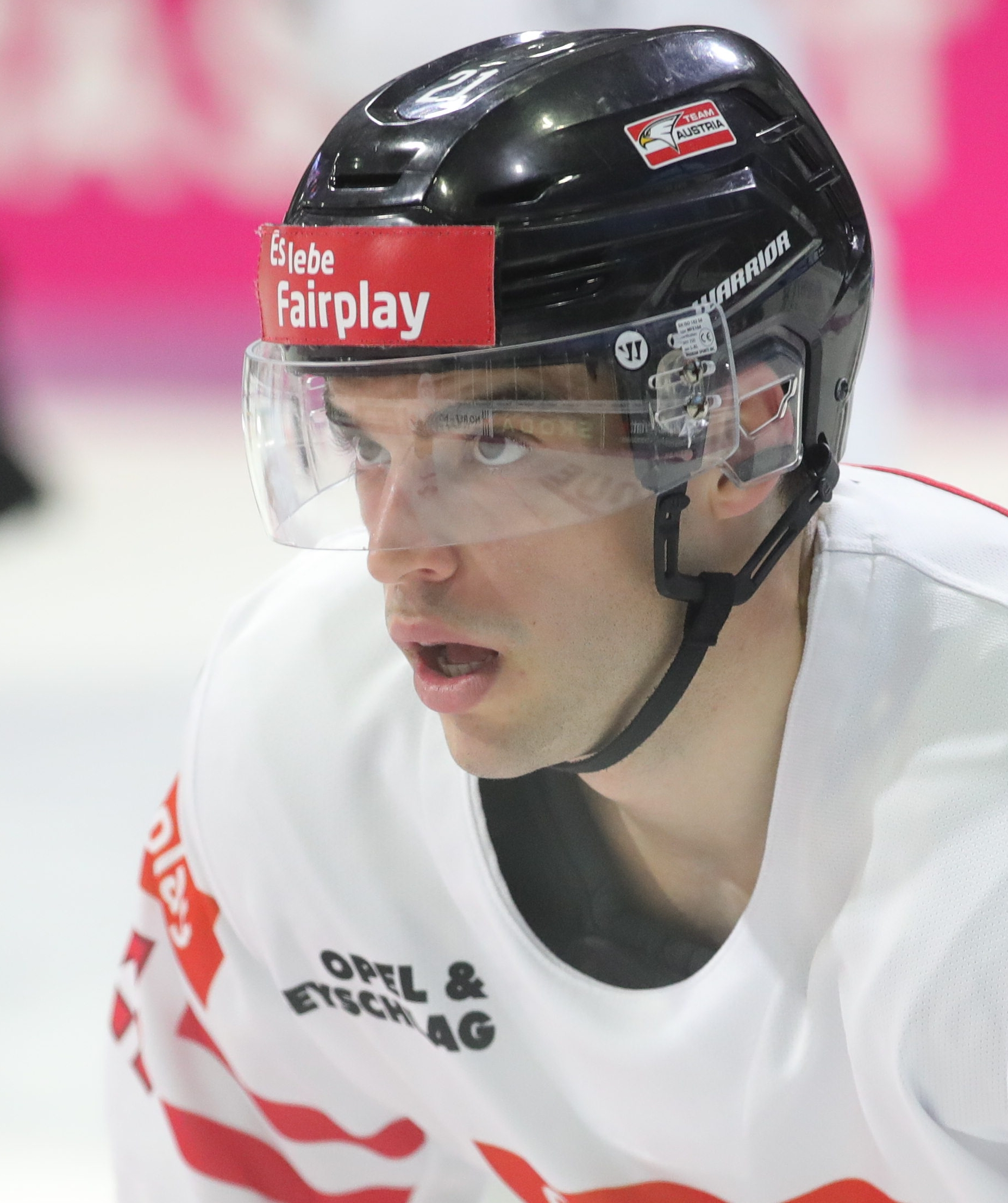
- Haudum with Austria in 2023
- Born: 21 May 1997 (age 28) Linz, Austria
- Height: 6 ft 0 in (183 cm)
- Weight: 183 lb (83 kg; 13 st 1 lb)
- Position: Centre
- Shoots: Left
- ICEHL team Former teams: Graz99ers; EHC Black Wings Linz; Malmö Redhawks; EC KAC
- National team: Austria
- Playing career: 2013–present

Lukas Haudum (born 21 May 1997) is an Austrian professional ice hockey centre playing for Graz99ers of the ICE Hockey League (ICEHL).

Haudum previously played in the Swedish Hockey League (SHL) for the Malmö Redhawks.
