= Martin Schumnig =

Austrian ice hockey player

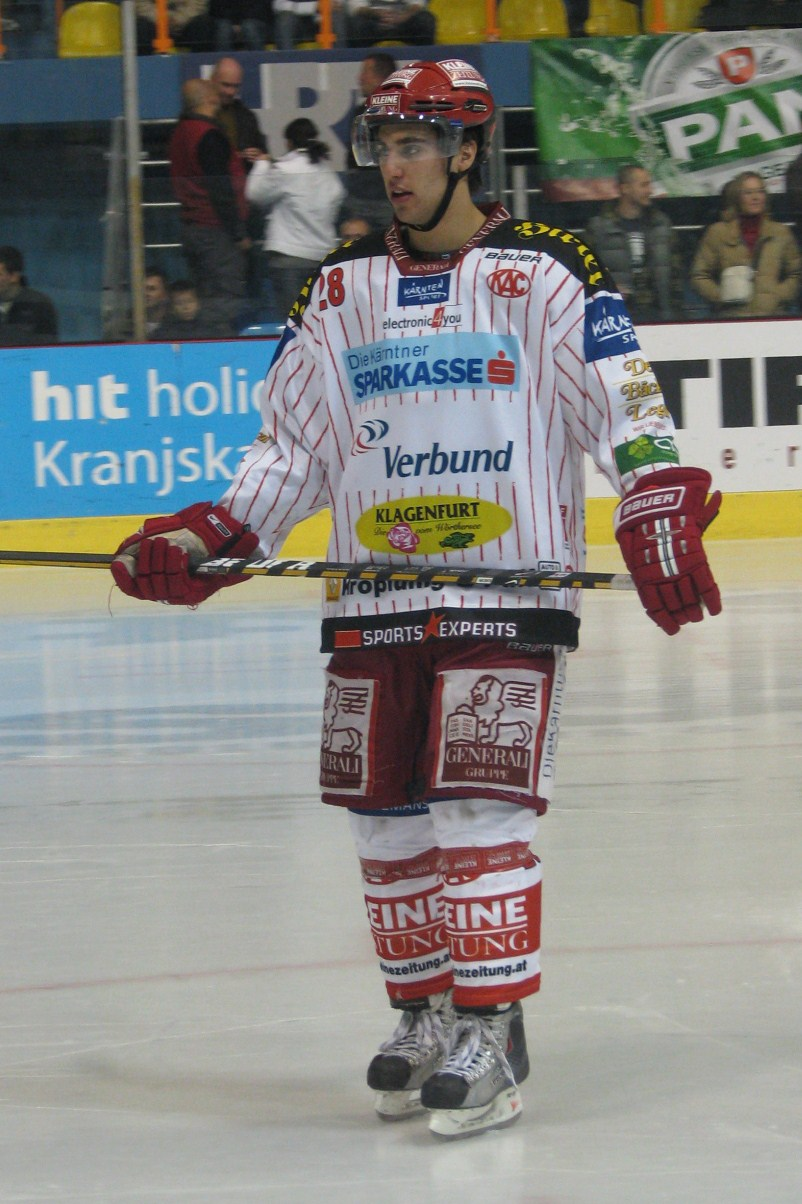
- Born: July 28, 1989 (age 35); Klagenfurt, Austria
- Height: 6 ft 0 in (183 cm)
- Weight: 190 lb (86 kg; 13 st 8 lb)
- Position: Defence
- Shoots: Right
- ICEHL team Former teams: Black Wings Linz; EC KAC
- National team: Austria
- NHL draft: Undrafted
- Playing career: 2006–present

Martin Schumnig (born July 28, 1989) is an Austrian professional ice hockey defenceman who is currently playing with Black Wings Linz of the ICE Hockey League (ICEHL). He has spent the majority of his playing career with EC KAC of his native Austria.

On August 21, 2013, Schumnig was signed his first North American contract, signing with the Cincinnati Cyclones of the ECHL, however, just prior to opening the 2013–14 season, Schumnig was released from his contract and returned to Klagenfurt on October 18, 2013.

Following the first 16 seasons of his career exclusively with EC KAC, Schumnig opted to continue his career by signing a one-year deal with fellow Austrian ICEHL club, Black Wings Linz, on 26 April 2022.

== International ==
Schumnig participated at the 2011 and 2013 IIHF World Championships as a member of the Austria men's national ice hockey team.
