= 2011 IIHF World Championship Division I =

Tournament details
- Host countries: Hungary; Ukraine
- Venues: 2 (in 2 host cities)
- Dates: 17–23 April
- Teams: 12

The 2011 IIHF World Championship Division I was an international ice hockey tournament run by the International Ice Hockey Federation. Group A was contested in Budapest, Hungary, and Group B was contested in Kyiv, Ukraine, with both tournaments running from 17 to 23 April 2011.

== Participants ==
=== Group A ===
Team	Qualification
Hungary	Host, Placed 2nd in Division I Group B last year.
Italy	Placed 15th in the Elite Division and were relegated in 2010.
Japan	Placed 3rd in Division I Group A last year.
Netherlands	Placed 4th in Division I Group A last year.
Spain	Placed 1st in Division II Group A and were promoted in 2010.
South Korea	Placed 5th in Division I B last year.

- Japan withdrew due to many players and players' families being affected by the 2011 Tōhoku earthquake and tsunami. The IIHF decided that the 5th team in Group A would be relegated and Japan would retain their Division I place for the 2012 championship.

=== Group B ===
Team	Qualification
Estonia	Placed 1st in Division II Group B and were promoted in 2010.
Great Britain	Placed 4th in Division I Group B last year.
Kazakhstan	Placed 16th in the Elite Division and were relegated in 2010.
Lithuania	Placed 5th in Division I A last year.
Poland	Placed 3rd in Division I B last year.
Ukraine	Host, Placed 2nd in Division I Group A last year.

== Group A tournament ==
=== Standings ===
Promoted to Elite Division for 2012
Relegated to Division II for 2012

Rk	Team	GP	W	OTW	OTL	L	GF	GA	GDF	PTS
1	Italy	4	3	1	0	0	15	5	+10	11
2	Hungary	4	3	0	1	0	29	11	+18	10
3	South Korea	4	1	0	1	2	11	18	−7	4
4	Netherlands	4	1	0	0	3	16	18	−2	3
5	Spain	4	0	1	0	3	6	25	−19	2

=== Fixtures ===
All times local.

17 April; 16:00	Spain	0–2 (0–0, 0–1, 0–1)	Italy	Budapest Sports Arena; Attendance: 2,900

Game reference
Ander Alcaine	Goalies	Thomas Tragust	Referee: (Slovakia) Peter Lokšík
0–1 / 29:05 – P. Iannone (M. de Marchi, N. Plastino) (PP); 0–2 / 49:53 – A. Helfer (A. Hofer, A. Egger) (PP)			Referee: (Slovakia) Peter Lokšík
12 min	Penalties	12 min	Referee: (Slovakia) Peter Lokšík
8	Shots	60	Referee: (Slovakia) Peter Lokšík

17 April; 19:30	Netherlands	3–7 (0–4, 2–1, 1–2)	Hungary	Budapest Sports Arena; Attendance: 7,961

Game reference

Phil Groeneveld
Goalies
Zoltán Hetényi
Referee:
(United States) Harry Dumas

	0–1	13:53 – L. Sikorčin (K. Palkovics, C. Kovács)
	0–2	15:56 – A. Horváth (M. Vas, B. Ladányi) (PP)
	0–3	17:13 – C. Kovács
	0–4	18:12 – I. Sofron (B. Ladányi)
	0–5	28:35 – I. Sofron (A. Horváth, B. Ladányi) (PP)
31:07 – D. Hagemeijer (PP)	1–5
32:05 – C. van Schagen (J. Schaafsma, J. van Oorschot)	2–5
	2–6	43:59 – M. Vas (I. Sofron, B. Ladányi)
	2–7	55:43 – J. Vas (N. Galanisz)
58:56 – I. van den Heuvel (B. Teunissen, N. de Jong)	3–7

8 min
Penalties
4 min
21
Shots
40

18 April; 16:00	Italy	3–2 (2–1, 1–1, 0–0)	Netherlands	Budapest Sports Arena; Attendance: 2,820

Game reference

Daniel Bellissimo
Goalies
Ian Meierdres
Referee:
(France) Jimmy Bergamelli

00:21 – L. Ansoldi (M. Souza, A. Hofer)	1–0
03:40 – G. Scandella (A. Egger) (SH)	2–0
	2–1	16:56 – A. Demelinne (N. de Jong, M. Dalhuisen) (PP)
	2–2	24:11 – A. Demelinne (J. Schaafsma, C. van Schagen)
26:40 – P. Iannone (A. Helfer, A. Hofer) (PP)	3–2

10 min
Penalties
10 min
43
Shots
25

18 April; 19:30	Hungary	6–3 (3–1, 0–0, 3–2)	South Korea	Budapest Sports Arena; Attendance: 7,366

Game reference

Levente Szuper
Goalies
Hyun Seung Eum
Referee:
(Slovenia) Igor Dremelj

05:08 – M. Vas (A. Horváth)	1–0
09:39 – R. Holéczy (B. Magosi, A. Benk)	2–0
	2–1	14:58 – Lee D.K. (Lee Y.J., Kwon T.A.)
17:55 – I. Sofron (B. Ladányi, M. Vas)	3–1
	3–2	45:52 – Kim S.W.
	3–3	49:04 – Sin S.W. (Kim W.J.)
55:17 – D. Kóger	4–3
55:24 – I. Sofron (M.Vas, B. Ladányi)	5–3
58:38 – I. Sofron (B. Ladányi, T. Sille)	6–3

4 min
Penalties
6 min
41
Shots
18

20 April; 16:00	Spain	2–8 (0–4, 0–2, 2–2)	Netherlands	Budapest Sports Arena; Attendance: 1,960

Game reference

Ander Alcaine
Jose Lois Alonso
Goalies
Phil Groeneveld
Referee:
(Slovakia) Peter Loksik

	0–1	03:33 – J. Schaafsma (D. Hagemeijer)
	0–2	07:10 – A. Demelinne (C. van Schagen, N. de Jong)
	0–3	09:31 – D. Hagemeijer (I. van den Heuvel, P.Groeneveld) (SH)
	0–4	10:43 – M. Kars (L. Houkes, M. Bastings)
	0–5	30:46 – R. Wurm (L. Houkes, M. Bastings)
	0–6	35:14 – D. Hagemeijer (M. Kars, B. Willemse) (PP)
C. Quevedo (J. Muñoz) – 44:25	1–6
	1–7	45:57 – R. Wurm (M. Bastings, L. Houkes)
	1–8	47:47 – M. Kars (L. van Sloun, K. Bruijsten)
J. Palacin (PP) – 52:25	2–8

12 min
Penalties
12 min
22
Shots
61

20 April; 19:30	Italy	6–0 (1–0, 2–0, 3–0)	South Korea	Budapest Sports Arena; Attendance: 2,650

Game reference

Thomas Tragust
Goalies
Hyun Seung Eum
Referee:
(United States) Harry Dumas

10:54 – M. Insam (A. Egger, G. Scandella)	1–0
24:28 – G. Scandella (PP)	2–0
35:55 – M. Insam (A. Egger, G. Scandella)	3–0
40:46 – A. Egger (A. Helfer, M. Souza)	4–0
52:07 – T. Larkin (P. Iannone, J. Pittis) (SH)	5–0
58:54 – P. Iannone (R. Watson)	6–0

10 min
Penalties
6 min
42
Shots
29

22 April; 16:00	Netherlands	3–6 (1–1, 2–4, 0–1)	South Korea	Budapest Sports Arena; Attendance: 2,822

Game reference

Ian Meierdres
Goalies
Hyun Seung Eum
Referee:
(Slovenia) Igor Dremelj

	0–1	03:48 – Lee Y.J. (Kim Hyeok) (SH)
18:00 – I. van den Heuvel (D. Hagemeijer)	1–1
20:35 – J. Schaafsma (A. Demelinne, C. van Schagen)	2–1
	2–2	21:30 – Kim W.J. (Kim S.W., Kim B.J.)
	2–3	30:19 – Kim G.H. (Kim W.J.)
	2–4	32:30 – Park W.S. (Kim H.S., Lee Y.J.)
	2–5	34:08 – Lee D.K. (Song D.H.)
36:00 – R. Wurm (K. Bruijsten, E. Tummers)	3–5
	3–6	58:04 – Kim G.H. (Cho M.H.)

24 min
Penalties
16 min
28
Shots
38

22 April; 19:30	Hungary	13–1 (5–1, 3–0, 5–1)	Spain	Budapest Sports Arena; Attendance: 8,479

Game reference

Zoltán Hetényi
Goalies
Ander Alcaine
Jose Lois Alonso
Referee:
(France) Jimmy Bergamelli

9:15 – T. Pozsgai (Á. Hegyi, L. Sikorčin) (PP)	1–0
10:32 – A. Benk (B. Magosi, R. Holéczy)	2–0
11:24 – A. Horváth (B. Ladányi, M. Vas)	3–0
15:41 – B. Ladányi (M. Vas, A. Horváth) (SH)	4–0
16:55 – B. Magosi (T. Sille, R. Holéczy)	5–0
28:16 – A. Horváth (B. Ladányi, I. Sofron) (PP)	6–0
31:43 – K. Palkovics (J. Vas, Á. Hegyi) (PP)	7–0
35:20 – C. Kovács (D. Kóger, N. Galanisz)	8–0
	8–1	46:20 – J. Brabo (J. Gavilanes, C. Quevedo) (PP)
47:42 – K. Palkovics (L. Sikorčin, Á. Hegyi)	9–1
48:37 – N. Galanisz (C. Kovács, D. Kóger)	10–1
51:35 – C. Kovács (N. Galanisz, D. Kóger) (PP)	11–1
52:53 – I. Bartalis (B. Ladányi, I. Sofron)	12–1
56:39 – I. Sofron (V. Tokaji, A. Horváth) (PP)	13–1

8 min
Penalties
12 min
54
Shots
13

23 April; 16:00	South Korea	2–3 OT (0–1, 1–0, 1–1) (OT: 0–1)	Spain	Budapest Sports Arena; Attendance: 2,996

Game reference

Eum Hyun-Seung
Goalies
Ander Alcaine
Referee:
(Slovenia) Igor Dremelj

	0–1	18:09 – JJ Palacín (B. Ribot-Tona)
Kim W.J. (Kim G.H.) – 36:23	1–1
	1–2	45:23 – C. Quevedo (A. Pedraz)
Kim W.J. – 52:55	2–2
	2–3	64:05 – S. Barnola (J. Brabo, A. Pedraz) (PP)

27 min
Penalties
12 min
59
Shots
25

23 April; 19:30	Italy	4–3 OT (3–1, 0–1, 0–1) (OT: 1–0)	Hungary	Budapest Sports Arena; Attendance: 8,723

Game reference

Daniel Bellissimo
Goalies
Levente Szuper
Zoltán Hetényi
Referee:
(United States) Harry Dumas

M. Souza (M. De Marchi) – 03:36	1–0
G. Scandella (A. Hofer, A. Egger) – 10:00	2–0
	2–1	11:42 – B. Ladányi (A. Horváth, V. Tokaji) (PP2)
G. Scandella (A. Hofer, A. Helfer) (PP) – 19:51	3–1
	3–2	29:57 – L. Sikorcin (Á Hegyi, J. Vas)
	3–3	44:21 – M. Vas (B. Ladányi, I. Sofron)
A. Helfer (PP) – 60:56	4–3

8 min
Penalties
12 min
57
Shots
48

=== Scoring leaders ===
List shows the top skaters sorted by points, then goals.

Player	GP	G	A	Pts	+/−	PIM
(Hungary) Balázs Ladányi	4	2	10	12	+7	0
(Hungary) István Sofron	4	6	4	10	+6	0
(Hungary) András Horvath	4	3	6	9	+6	4
(Hungary) Márton Vas	4	3	5	8	+6	4
(Italy) Giulio Scandella	4	4	2	6	+4	4
(Italy) Alexander Egger	4	1	5	6	+5	2
(Netherlands) Diederick Hagemeijer	4	3	2	5	−1	6
(Hungary) Csaba Kovács	4	3	2	5	+2	2
(Italy) Armin Helfer	4	2	3	5	+3	0
(Hungary) Ladislav Sikorcin	4	2	3	5	+2	0

GP = Games played; G = Goals; A = Assists; Pts = Points; +/− = Plus/minus; PIM = Penalties in minutes; POS = Position
Source: IIHF.com

=== Leading goaltenders ===
Only the top five goaltenders, based on save percentage, who have played 40% of their team's minutes are included in this list.

Player	TOI	SA	GA	GAA	Sv%	SO
(Italy) Thomas Tragust	120:00	37	0	0.00	100.00	2
(Italy) Daniel Bellissimo	120:56	75	5	2.48	93.33	0
(Hungary) Levente Szuper	110:56	70	5	2.70	92.86	0
(Spain) Ander Alcaine	204:05	203	18	5.29	91.13	0
(Netherlands) Ian Meierdres	118:50	84	9	4.54	89.29	0

TOI = Time on ice (minutes:seconds); SA = Shots against; GA = Goals against; GAA = Goals against average; Sv% = Save percentage; SO = Shutouts
Source: IIHF.com

=== Tournament awards ===
Best players selected by the directorate

- Best Goaltender: Eum Hyun-Seung (KOR)
- Best Forward: István Sofron (HUN)
- Best Defenseman: Armin Helfer (ITA)

== Group B tournament ==
=== Standings ===
Promoted to Elite Division for 2012
Relegated to Division II for 2012

Rk	Team	GP	W	OTW	OTL	L	GF	GA	GDF	PTS
1	Kazakhstan	5	4	1	0	0	21	6	+15	14
2	Great Britain	5	4	0	0	1	21	9	+12	12
3	Ukraine	5	3	0	1	1	19	12	+7	10
4	Poland	5	2	0	0	3	18	15	+3	6
5	Lithuania	5	1	0	0	4	9	24	−15	3
6	Estonia	5	0	0	0	5	8	30	−22	0

=== Fixtures ===
All times local.

17 April; 13:30	Estonia	1–5 (0–2, 1–1, 0–2)	Kazakhstan	Palace of Sports, Kyiv; Attendance: 1,602

Game reference

Villem-Henrik Koitmaa
Goalies
Vitaliy Yeremeyev
Referee:
(Netherlands) Ruud van Baast

	0–1	07:58 – F. Polichshuk (D. Dudarev, M. Belyayev)
	0–2	16:01 – V. Krasnoslabodtsev (T. Zhailauov, V. Vitali) (PP)
28:46 – A. Makrov (T. Suursoo, A. Nekrassov)	1–2
	1–3	39:18 – D. Dudarev (F. Polichshuk, V. Krasnoslobodtsev)
	1–4	55:48 – T. Zhailauov (V. Krasnoslobodtsev, A. Gavrilin)
	1–5	59:08 – R. Starchenko (Y. Bumagin)

8 min
Penalties
6 min
18
Shots
37

17 April; 17:00	Lithuania	1–5 (1–2, 0–2, 0–1)	Poland	Palace of Sports, Kyiv; Attendance: 2,813

Game reference

Nerijus Dauksevicius
Mantas Armalis
Goalies
Rafal Radziszewski
Referee:
(Czech Republic) Jan Hribik

	0–1	09:19 – M. Danieluk (M. Kotlorz) (PP)
12:21 – P. Rulevičius (M. Kieras) (PP)	1–1
	1–2	15:00 – J. Witecki (G. Pasiut) (PP)
	1–3	38:38 – J. Rzeszutko (P. Noworyta) (SH)
	1–4	39:38 – M. Luposki (M. Kolusz)
	1–5	51:02 – M. Kolusz (M. Kotlorz, R. Dutka) (PP)

14 min
Penalties
12 min
20
Shots
31

17 April; 20:30	Great Britain	5–3 (0–1, 3–2, 2–0)	Ukraine	Palace of Sports, Kyiv; Attendance: 6,213

Game reference

Stephen Murphy
Goalies
Kostiantyn Simchuk
Referee:
(Germany) Richard Schütz

	0–1	11:40 – O. Pobyedonostsev (V. Lyutkevych, O. Materukhin) (PP2)
24:15 – D. Clarke (G. Owen, J. Hutchins)	1–1
	1–2	26:12 – O. Tymchenko (O. Shafarenko, O. Materukhin) (PP)
31:11 – R. Dowd (A. Tait, J. Hewitt)	2–2
36:22 – D. Clarke (J. Hutchins, G. Owen)	3–2
	3–3	38:03 – O. Pobyedonostsev (O. Materukhin, O. Tymchenko)
43:05 – C. Shields (J. Weaver, D. Longstaff) (PP)	4–3
52:24 – J. Phillips (R. Cowley, D. Meyers)	5–3

20 min
Penalties
26 min
21
Shots
27

18 April; 13:30	Poland	8–3 (1–0, 2–1, 5–2)	Estonia	Palace of Sports, Kyiv; Attendance: 875

Game reference

Rafal Radziszewski
Goalies
Villem-Henrik Koitmaa
Aleksandr Kolossov
Referee:
(Germany) Richard Schütz

05:47 – K. Zapala (P. Dronia, M. Kolusz)	1–0
	1–1	21:00 – A. Petrov (A. Ossipov, K. Kaljuste)
23:58 – M. Lopuski (M. Kolusz)	2–1
36:55 – M. Urbanowicz	3–1
41:03 – M. Luposki (L. Laszkievicz, K. Zapala)	4–1
42:37 – M. Kolusz (K. Zapala, P. Dronia)	5–1
49:18 – J. Rzeszutko (M. Luposki) (SH)	6–1
52:39 – K. Dziubinski (L. Laszkiewicz, G. Pasiut)	7–1
54:42 – G. Pasiut (L. Laszkiewicz)	8–1
	8–2	55:37 – A. Sibirtsev
	8–3	58:01 – D. Suur (A. Makrov)

6 min
Penalties
4 min
39
Shots
22

18 April; 17:00	Kazakhstan	2–1 (0–1, 1–0, 1–0)	Great Britain	Palace of Sports, Kyiv; Attendance: 2,119

Game reference

Vitaliy Yeremeyev
Goalies
Stephen Murphy
Referee:
(Czech Republic) Jan Hribik

	0–1	14:46 – D. Longstaff (P. Hill, C. Shields)
29:08 – A. Gavrilin (V. Novopashin, V. Krasnoslobodtsev)	1–1
54:34 – D. Dudarev (F. Polishuk)	2–1

10 min
Penalties
8 min
32
Shots
14

18 April; 20:30	Ukraine	5–1 (2–0, 1–1, 2–0)	Lithuania	Palace of Sports, Kyiv; Attendance: 3,675

Game reference

Olexander Fedorov
Goalies
Mantas Armalis
Referee:
(Canada) David Lewis

02:33 – D. Nimenko (A. Mikhnov)	1–0
14:28 – O. Pobyedonostsev (V. Lyutkevych, O. Shafarenko) (PP)	2–0
	2–1	22:11 – M. Kieras (N. Alisauskas)
37:33 – O. Materukhin (V. Lyutkevych, A. Sryubko)	3–1
44:43 – S. Chernenko (D. Nimenko)	4–1
46:18 – O. Shafarenko (O. Tymchenko, O. Pobyedonostsev)	5–1

16 min
Penalties
12 min
34
Shots
24

20 April; 13:30	Kazakhstan	7–0 (2–0, 3–0, 2–0)	Lithuania	Palace of Sports, Kyiv; Attendance: 1,002

Game reference

Vitali Kolesnik
Goalies
Nerius Dausevicius
Referee:
(Netherlands) Ruud van Baast

03:05 – T. Zhailauov (A. Gavrilin, V. Krasnoslobodtsev)	1–0
07:13 – Y. Bumagin (A. Vassilchenko, K. Pushkaryov)	2–0
26:54 – Y. Bumagin (A. Vassilchenko, K. Romanov)	3–0
30:26 – K. Romanov (K. Pushkaryov, A. Lakiza)	4–0
31:04 – R. Starchenko (T. Zhailauov, A. Troshinski)	5–0
53:45 – T. Zhailauov (A. Troshinski, A. Gavrilin) (PP)	6–0
55:58 – M. Khudyakov (R. Savchenko, Y. Fadeyev)	7–0

4 min
Penalties
16 min
41
Shots
12

20 April; 17:00	Estonia	0–7 (0–7, 0–0, 0–0)	Great Britain	Palace of Sports, Kyiv; Attendance: 1,248

Game reference

Villem-Henrik Koitmaa
Aleksandr Kolossov
Goalies
Stephen Murphy
Nathan Craze
Referee:
(Canada) David Lewis

0–1	03:06 – P. Hill (C. Shields, M. Richardson) (PP)
0–2	04:59 – A. Tait (R. Dowd)
0–3	08:19 – D. Longstaff (J. Weaver)
0–4	08:45 – D. Phillips (J. Hutchins, B. O'Connor)
0–5	10:41 – D. Clarke (R. Lachowicz, G. Owen)
0–6	18:17 – B. O'Connor (D. Clarke, G. Owen)
0–7	19:42 – R. Dowd (J. Weaver, S. Murphy) (PP)

8 min
Penalties
4 min
24
Shots
20

20 April; 20:30	Ukraine	4–1 (1–0, 3–1, 0–0)	Poland	Palace of Sports, Kyiv; Attendance: 6,676

Game reference

Kostiantyn Simchuk
Goalies
Rafal Radziszewski
Przemyslaw Odrobny
Referee:
(Czech Republic) Jan Hribik

14:47 – A. Mikhnov (V. Shakhraychuk, S. Klymentyev) (PP)	1–0
23:54 – O. Shafarenko (V. Lyutkevych)	2–0
34:37 – O. Tymchenko (O. Shafarenko, O. Materukhin)	3–0
	3–1	39:23 – G. Pasiut (SH)
39:58 – O. Shafarenko (O. Materukhin, O. Tymchenko) (PP)	4–1

10 min
Penalties
12 min
33
Shots
25

21 April; 13:30	Great Britain	5–2 (4–0, 1–1, 0–1)	Lithuania	Palace of Sports, Kyiv; Attendance: 714

Game reference

Stephen Murphy
Goalies
Mantas Armalis
Referee:
(Germany) Richard Schütz

M. Myers (J. Hutchins, D. Phillips) – 02:31	1–0
B. O' Connor (C. Neilson, J. Weaver) (PP) – 13:26	2–0
D. Longstaff (J. Weaver, C. Neilson) – 16:59	3–0
D. Clarke (PS) – 19:24	4–0
C. Neilson (D. Longstaff, R. Lachowicz) – 30:12	5–0
	5–1	32:56 – D. Lelėnas (D. Pliskauskas) (SH)
	5–2	50:14 – D. Pliskauskas (M. Kieras, D. Vaiciukevicius)

18 min
Penalties
22 min
30
Shots
24

21 April; 17:00	Poland	2–4 (0–2, 0–1, 2–1)	Kazakhstan	Palace of Sports, Kyiv; Attendance: 1,538

Game reference

Przemyslaw Odrobny
Goalies
Vitaliy Yeremeyev
Referee:
(Canada) David Lewis

	0–1	05:57 – M. Belyayev (F. Polishuk, D. Dudarev)
	0–2	11:37 – R. Savchenko (R. Starchenko, Y. Fadeyev) (PP)
	0–3	34:58 – K. Pushkaryov (R. Starchenko, K. Romanov)
M. Urbanowicz (J. Rzeszutko) – 41:06	1–3
L. Laszkiewicz (G. Pasiut, P. Noworyta) (PP) – 50:06	2–3
	2–4	59:08 – M. Semyonov (SH, ENG)

8 min
Penalties
8 min
25
Shots
27

21 April; 20:30	Ukraine	5–2 (1–0, 4–2, 0–0)	Estonia	Palace of Sports, Kyiv; Attendance: 5,238

Game reference

Olexander Fedorov
Goalies
Villem-Henrik Koitmaa
Referee:
(Netherlands) Ruud van Baast

V. Shakhraychuk (A. Mikhnov, S. Klymentyev) (PP) – 17:27	1–0
O. Tymchenko (O. Materukhin, A. Sryubko) – 23:15	2–0
	2–1	24:21 – A. Makrov
S. Klymentyev (D. Tsyrul, V. Shakhraychuk) – 24:59	3–1
O. Materukhin (O. Shafarenko, V. Lyutkevych) (PP) – 33:37	4–1
	4–2	37:17 – A. Makrov (L. Lahesalu, A. Petrov)
O. Materukhin (O. Shafarenko, V. Lyutkevych) (SH) – 39:06	5–2

6 min
Penalties
12 min
47
Shots
14

23 April; 12:30	Lithuania	5–2 (2–1, 1–1, 2–0)	Estonia	Palace of Sports, Kyiv; Attendance: 892

Game reference

Mantas Armalis
Goalies
Villem-Henrik Koitmaa
Referee:
(Germany) Richard Schütz

M. Kieras (E. Bauba, D. Kumeliauskas) (PP) – 05:12	1–0
A. Katulis (P. Rulevičius, D. Kumeliauskas) (PP) – 09:49	2–0
	2–1	19:17 – V. Titarenko (A. Sibirtsev, A. Nekrassov)
P. Verenis (A. Bosas) – 31:57	3–1
	3–2	35:20 – T. Suursoo (A. Petrov, A. Makrov)
D. Kumeliauskas (E. Bauba, P. Rulevičius) – 48:28	4–2
P. Verenis (A. Bosas) (ENG) – 58:58	5–2

8 min
Penalties
18 min
35
Shots
31

23 April; 16:00	Poland	2–3 (1–2, 1–0, 0–1)	Great Britain	Palace of Sports, Kyiv; Attendance: 1,754

Game reference

Rafal Radziszewski
Goalies
Stephen Murphy
Referee:
(Czech Republic) Jan Hribik

F. Drzewiecki (K. Dziubinski, M. Urbanowicz) – 06:51	1–0
	1–1	13:15 – J. Weaver (D. Longstaff, A. Tait) (PP)
	1–2	13:55 – R. Cowley (D. Clarke, M. Myers)
K. Dziubinski (M. Kotlorz, M. Kolusz) – 33:36	2–2
	2–3	53:04 – B. O' Connor (D. Clarke, J. Weaver) (PP)

6 min
Penalties
8 min
37
Shots
20

23 April; 19:30	Kazakhstan	3–2 OT (0–0, 1–1, 1–1) (OT: 1–0)	Ukraine	Palace of Sports, Kyiv; Attendance: 6,837

Game reference

Vitaliy Yeremeyev
Goalies
Kostiantyn Simchuk
Referee:
(Canada) David Lewis

M. Belyayev (PP) – 31:11	1–0
	1–1	39:40 – Y. Navarenko (V. Shakhraychuk, A. Mikhnov) (PP)
	1–2	45:08 – O. Tymchenko (V. Lyutkevych, O. Pobyedonostsev)
A. Gavrilin (A. Troshinski, K. Pushkaryov) – 52:22	2–2
F. Polishuk (D. Dudarev, A. Koledayev) – 62:01	3–2

12 min
Penalties
26 min
31
Shots
23

=== Scoring leaders ===
List shows the top skaters sorted by points, then goals.

Player	GP	G	A	Pts	+/−	PIM
(Ukraine) Olexander Materukhin	5	3	6	9	+6	12
(Ukraine) Oleg Shafarenko	5	3	5	8	+6	16
(United Kingdom) Jonathan Weaver	5	1	7	8	+1	0
(United Kingdom) David Clarke	5	4	3	7	+4	4
(Ukraine) Oleg Tymchenko	5	4	3	7	+6	4
(Ukraine) Vitaly Lyutkevych	5	0	7	7	+7	0
(United Kingdom) David Longstaff	5	3	3	6	+3	0
(Poland) Marcin Kolusz	5	2	4	6	+1	4
(Estonia) Andrei Makrov	5	3	2	5	−4	4
(Ukraine) Olexander Pobyedonostsev	5	3	2	5	+5	2
(Kazakhstan) Talgat Zhailauov	5	3	2	5	+4	0

GP = Games played; G = Goals; A = Assists; Pts = Points; +/− = Plus/minus; PIM = Penalties in minutes; POS = Position
Source: IIHF.com

=== Leading goaltenders ===
Only the top five goaltenders, based on save percentage, who have played 40% of their team's minutes are included in this list.

Player	TOI	SA	GA	GAA	Sv%	SO
(United Kingdom) Stephen Murphy	285:25	138	9	1.89	93.48	0
(Kazakhstan) Vitaly Yeremeyev	242:01	80	6	1.49	92.50	0
(Ukraine) Kostiantyn Simchuk	180:26	77	9	2.99	88.31	0
(Lithuania) Mantas Armalis	200:00	104	13	3.90	87.50	0
(Poland) Rafal Radziszewski	219:19	86	11	3.01	87.21	0

TOI = Time on ice (minutes:seconds); SA = Shots against; GA = Goals against; GAA = Goals against average; Sv% = Save percentage; SO = Shutouts
Source: IIHF.com

=== Tournament awards ===
Best players selected by the directorate

- Best Goaltender: Stephen Murphy (GBR)
- Best Forward: Olexander Materukhin (UKR)
- Best Defenseman: Roman Savchenko (KAZ)

== IIHF broadcasting rights ==
Country	Broadcaster
Estonia	Viasat Sport Baltic
Hungary	Sport 1
Italy	Rai Sport
Kazakhstan	Kazakhstan
Lithuania	Viasat Sport Baltic
Poland	Polsat Sport
Ukraine	First National Channel
