= 2009 IIHF World Championship Division I rosters =

This page lists the rosters for the 2009 IIHF World Championship Division I.

== Division IA ==
=== Australia ===
- Head coach: (Canada) Steve McKenna

Pos.	No.	Player	Team
GK	1	Stuart Denman	(Australia) Melbourne Ice
GK	29	Matt Ezzy	(Australia) Newcastle Northstars
D	2	David Huxley	(Australia) Adelaide Adrenaline
D	4	Robert Starke	(Australia) Newcastle Northstars
D	5	Joshua Harding	(Australia) Adelaide Adrenaline
D	16	David Dunwoodie	(Australia) West Sydney Ice Dogs
D	17	Andrew White	(Australia) West Sydney Ice Dogs
D	24	Riccardo Del Basso	(Australia) West Coast Flyers
D	25	Jarred Seymour	(Australia) Stouffville Spirit
F	6	Roberto Franchini	(Australia) Sydney Bears
F	7	Adrian Esposito	(Australia) Sydney Bears
F	8	Casey Minson	(Australia) Newcastle Northstars
F	9	Tomas Manco	(Australia) West Sydney Ice Dogs
F	10	Greg Oddy	(Australia) Adelaide Adrenaline
F	11	Vladan Stransky	(Australia) Sydney Bears
F	14	Bradley Young	(Australia) West Coast Avalanche
F	15	Mitchell Villani	(Australia) Adelaide Adrenaline
F	18	Todd Stephenson	(Australia) West Sydney Ice Dogs
F	19	Scott Stephenson	(Australia) West Sydney Ice Dogs
F	20	Vlad Rubes	(Australia) Sydney Bears
F	22	Lliam Webster	(Australia) Melbourne Ice
F	23	David Upton	(Australia) Brisbane Blue Tongues

=== Croatia ===
- Head coach: (Slovenia) Pavle Kavčič

Pos.	No.	Player	Team
GK	1	Nenad Škrapec	(Croatia) KHL Zagreb
GK	30	Vanja Belić	(Croatia) KHL Mladost
D	4	Miroslav Brumerčik	(Croatia) KHL Medveščak Zagreb
D	6	Marko Tadić	(Croatia) KHL Mladost
D	10	Igor Jačmenjak	(Croatia) KHL Mladost
D	12	Saša Belić	(Croatia) KHL Medveščak Zagreb
D	16	Luka Novosel	(Croatia) KHL Medveščak Zagreb
D	24	Nikša Trstenjak	(Croatia) KHL Mladost
D	25	Tomislav Šulevski	(Croatia) KHL Medveščak Zagreb
D	26	Mario Sertić	(Croatia) KHL Zagreb
F	3	Dominik Kanaet	(Slovakia) MHC Martin
F	8	Petar Trstenjak	(Slovakia) HC Slovan Bratislava
F	11	Viliam Chovanec	(Slovakia) HC Sabinov
F	14	Mato Mlađenović	(Croatia) KHL Medveščak Zagreb
F	15	Mario Novak	(Croatia) KHL Mladost
F	17	Borna Rendulić	(Finland) Ässät
F	18	Janko Kučera	(Croatia) KHL Mladost
F	20	Veljko Žibret	(Croatia) KHL Medveščak Zagreb
F	22	Tomislav Grozaj	(Croatia) KHL Mladost
F	23	Damir Jakovac	(Croatia) KHL Mladost
F	27	Kresimir Švigir	(Croatia) KHL Medveščak Zagreb
F	28	Matija Kopajtić	(Croatia) KHL Zagreb

=== Japan ===
- Head coach: (Germany) Mark Mahon

Pos.	No.	Player	Team
GK	1	Masahito Haruna	(Japan) Oji Eagles
GK	30	Hisashi Ishikawa	(Japan) Nippon Paper Cranes
D	2	Jun Tonosaki	(Japan) Nippon Paper Cranes
D	4	Aaron Keller	(Japan) Oji Eagles
D	5	Fumitaka Miyauchi	(Japan) Seibu Prince Rabbits
D	6	Makoto Kawashima	(Japan) Oji Eagles
D	12	Yōsuke Haga	(Japan) Oji Eagles
D	24	Ryuichi Kawai	(Japan) Seibu Prince Rabbits
D	27	Ryota Minami	(Japan) Oji Eagles
F	8	Yōsuke Kon	(Japan) Seibu Prince Rabbits
F	9	Sho Sato	(Japan) Seibu Prince Rabbits
F	10	Toru Kamino	(Japan) Seibu Prince Rabbits
F	11	Masahito Nishiwaki	(Japan) Seibu Prince Rabbits
F	13	Masafumi Ogawa	(Japan) Oji Eagles
F	14	Go Tanaka	(Japan) Seibu Prince Rabbits
F	15	Shuhei Kuji	(Japan) Waseda University
F	16	Daisuke Obara	(Japan) Seibu Prince Rabbits
F	17	Yohinori Iimura	(Japan) Nippon Paper Cranes
F	18	Takahito Suzuki	(Japan) Seibu Prince Rabbits
F	19	Takeshi Saito	(Japan) Oji Eagles
F	25	Shunsuke Shigeno	(Japan) Chuo University
F	26	Tetsuya Saito	(Japan) Oji Eagles

=== Kazakhstan ===
- Head coach: (Russia) Andrei Shayanov

Pos.	No.	Player	Team
GK	29	Ivan Poloshkov	(Kazakhstan) Kazzinc-Torpedo
GK	30	Alexei Kuznetsov	(Kazakhstan) Barys Astana
D	3	Yevgeni Mazunin	(Russia) Yermak Angarsk
D	4	Sergei Yakovenko	(Russia) Mechel Chelyabinsk
D	5	Vladislav Kolesnikov	(Kazakhstan) Kazzinc-Torpedo
D	6	Artemi Lakiza	(Kazakhstan) Barys Astana
D	7	Yevgeni Fadeyev	(Kazakhstan) Barys Astana
D	9	Vladimir Antipin	(Russia) Amur Khabarovsk
D	11	Roman Savchenko	(Kazakhstan) Kazzinc-Torpedo
D	20	Georgi Petrov	(Kazakhstan) Kazzinc-Torpedo
F	10	Maksim Belyayev	(Russia) Lada Togliatti
F	14	Alexei Vorontsov	(Kazakhstan) Kazzinc-Torpedo
F	15	Andrei Samokhvalov	(Belarus) Khimvolonko Mogilev
F	16	Alexander Shin	(Kazakhstan) Kazzinc-Torpedo
F	17	Aleksandr Koreshkov	(Kazakhstan) Barys Astana
F	18	Yevgeni Rymarev	(Kazakhstan) Barys Astana
F	22	Roman Starchenko	(Kazakhstan) Barys Astana
F	23	Andrei Spiridonov	(Kazakhstan) Kazzinc-Torpedo
F	24	Sergey Alexandrov	(Kazakhstan) Kazzinc-Torpedo
F	25	Ilya Solarev	(Kazakhstan) Barys Astana
F	26	Vadim Krasnoslobotsev	(Kazakhstan) Barys Astana
F	28	Andrei Gavrilin	(Kazakhstan) Barys Astana

=== Lithuania ===
- Head coach: (Lithuania) Dmitrij Medvedev

Pos.	No.	Player	Team
GK	29	Emestas Kielius	(Czech Republic) Hvezda Prague
GK	30	Nerijus Dauksevicius	(Lithuania) SC Energija
D	3	Mindaugas Kieras	(Lithuania) SC Energija
D	4	Petras Nauseda	(Lithuania) SC Energija
D	5	Justinas Vezelis	(Lithuania) SC Energija
D	6	Arturas Katulis	(Russia) Dizel Penza
D	7	Tomas Vysniauskas	(Lithuania) SC Energija
D	13	Andrius Kaminskas	(United Kingdom) Bracknell Bees
D	18	Karolis Nekrasevicius	(Finland) Lukko
D	25	Rolandas Aliukonis	(Lithuania) SC Energija
F	9	Egidijus Bauba	(Latvia) DHK Latgale
F	10	Dmitrijus Bernatavicius	(Russia) Sputnik Nizhny Tagil
F	12	Sergej Ivanuskin	(Russia) HC Dmitrov
F	15	Arnoldas Bosas	(Czech Republic) HC Sparta Praha
F	17	Tadas Kumeliauskas	(Lithuania) SC Energija
F	19	Donatas Kumeliauskas	(Latvia) DHK Latgale
F	21	Martynas Slikas	(Lithuania) SC Energija
F	22	Dovydas Kulevicius	(Lithuania) SC Energija
F	23	Serunas Kuliesius	(Lithuania) SC Energija
F	24	Darius Lelenas	(Latvia) HK Liepājas Metalurgs
F	27	Povilas Verenis	(Lithuania) SC Energija
F	28	Dalius Vaiciukevicius	(Lithuania) SC Energija

=== Slovenia ===
- Head coach: (United States) John Harrington

Pos.	No.	Player	Team
GK	1	Andrej Hocevar	(Slovenia) HK Acroni Jesenice
GK	30	Ales Sila	(Slovenia) HDD Olimpija Ljubljana
D	3	Ziga Svete	(Finland) Hokki
D	4	Andrej Tavzelj	(Slovenia) HDD Olimpija Ljubljana
D	5	Mitja Robar	(Slovenia) HK Acroni Jesenice
D	6	Bostjan Groznik	(Slovenia) HDD Olimpija Ljubljana
D	7	Žiga Pavlin	(Slovenia) HDD Olimpija Ljubljana
D	20	Sabahudin Kovacevic	(Slovenia) HDD Olimpija Ljubljana
D	27	Jakob Molvanovic	(France) Briançon Alpes Provence HC
F	9	Tomaz Razingar	(Slovenia) HK Acroni Jesenice
F	10	Mitja Šivic	(France) Brûleurs de Loups
F	12	David Rodman	(Slovenia) HK Acroni Jesenice
F	13	Rok Tičar	(Sweden) Timrå IK
F	14	Matej Hocevar	(Slovenia) HDD Olimpija Ljubljana
F	15	Egon Muric	(Slovenia) HDD Olimpija Ljubljana
F	16	Alex Music	(Slovenia) HDD Olimpija Ljubljana
F	17	Jurij Goličič	(Slovenia) HDD Olimpija Ljubljana
F	18	Gregor Polončič	(Slovenia) HK Acroni Jesenice
F	19	Ziga Pance	(Slovenia) HDD Olimpija Ljubljana
F	21	Andrej Hebar	(Slovenia) HK Acroni Jesenice
F	22	Marcel Rodman	(Slovenia) HK Acroni Jesenice
F	24	Anze Terlikar	(Slovenia) HK Acroni Jesenice

== Division IB ==
=== Great Britain ===
- Head coach: (United Kingdom) Paul Thompson

Pos.	No.	Player	Team
GK	29	Jody Lehman	(United Kingdom) Sheffield Steelers
GK	30	Stevie Lyle	(United Kingdom) Belfast Giants
D	4	Shane Johnson	(United Kingdom) Belfast Giants
D	13	David Phillips	(United Kingdom) Belfast Giants
D	14	Jonathan Weaver	(United Kingdom) Coventry Blaze
D	15	Tom Watkins	(United Kingdom) Coventry Blaze
D	18	Graeme Walton	(United Kingdom) Belfast Giants
D	22	Mark Thomas	(United Kingdom) Sheffield Steelers
D	23	Danny Meyers	(United Kingdom) Nottingham Panthers
D	27	Ben O'Connor	(United Kingdom) Coventry Blaze
F	5	David Clarke	(United Kingdom) Nottingham Panthers
F	7	Jason Hewitt	(United Kingdom) Sheffield Steelers
F	8	Matt Myers	(United Kingdom) Nottingham Panthers
F	9	Greg Owen	(France) Briançon Alpes Provence HC
F	10	Mark Richardson	(United Kingdom) Nottingham Panthers
F	11	Phil Hill	(United Kingdom) Cardiff Devils
F	12	Robert Dowd	(United Kingdom) Sheffield Steelers
F	17	Russell Cowley	(United Kingdom) Coventry Blaze
F	19	Colin Shields	(United Kingdom) Belfast Giants
F	21	Ashley Tait	(United Kingdom) Sheffield Steelers
F	24	Greg Chambers	(United Kingdom) Basingstoke Bison
F	25	David Longstaff	(United Kingdom) Newcastle Vipers

=== Italy ===
- Head coach: (Canada) Rick Cornacchia

Pos.	No.	Player	Team
GK	1	Thomas Tragust	(Italy) SHC Fassa
GK	30	Adam Russo	(France) Diables Noirs de Tours
D	4	Christian Borgatello	(Italy) HC Bolzano
D	6	Michele Strazzabosco	(Italy) SG Cortina
D	7	Stefano Marchetti	(Italy) SHC Fassa
D	14	Armin Hofer	(Italy) HC Pustertal-Val Pusteria
D	16	Trevor Johnson	(Italy) HC Asiago
D	18	Steven Gallace	(Italy) SG Cortina
D	26	Armin Helfer	(Switzerland) Kloten Flyers
F	2	Stefan Zisser	(Italy) HC Bolzano
F	5	Diego Iori	(Italy) SHC Fassa
F	8	John Parco	(Italy) HC Asiago
F	9	Girogio de Bettin	(Italy) SG Cortina
F	11	Roland Ramoser	(Italy) HC Bolzano
F	15	Luca Felicetti	(Italy) SHC Fassa
F	17	Luca Ansoldi	(Italy) HC Bolzano
F	21	Thomas Pichler	(Italy) HC Pustertal-Val Pusteria
F	22	Stefano Margoni	(Italy) HC Pontebba
F	23	Patrick Iannone	(Italy) HC Pustertal-Val Pusteria
F	24	Nicola Fontanive	(Italy) HC Alleghe
F	27	Michael Souza	(Italy) SG Cortina
F	28	Manuel de Toni	(Italy) HC Alleghe

=== Netherlands ===
- Head coach: (Netherlands) Tommie Hueartogs

Pos.	No.	Player	Team
GK	1	Casper Swart	(Netherlands) HYS The Hague
GK	29	Martijn Maghielse	(Netherlands) Heerenveen Flyers
GK	30	Phil Groeneveld	(Italy) HC Alleghe
D	2	Peinier Staats	(Netherlands) Eindhoven Kemphanen
D	4	Nick Verbruggen	(Netherlands) Eindhoven Kemphanen
D	9	Nicky de Jong	(Netherlands) Heerenveen Flyers
D	14	Jordy van Oorschot	(Netherlands) Amsterdam Tigers
D	16	Chad Euverman	(France) Chamonix Hockey Club
D	22	Erik Tummers	(Netherlands) Geleen Smoke Eaters
D	25	Bjorn Willemse	(Netherlands) Tilburg Trappers
F	5	Diederick Hagmeijer	(Netherlands) Eindhoven Kemphanen
F	6	Ivy van den Heuvel	(Netherlands) Amsterdam Tigers
F	8	Antony Demelinne	(Netherlands) HYS The Hague
F	10	Peter van Biezen	(Netherlands) Tilburg Trappers
F	15	Mitch Bruijsten	(United States) Sioux City Musketeers
F	17	Bob Teunissen	(Netherlands) Tilburg Trappers
F	18	Levi Houkes	(Netherlands) Nijmegen Devils
F	19	Casey van Schagen	(Netherlands) Tilburg Trappers
F	20	Mat Korthuis	(Netherlands) HYS The Hague
F	21	Marcel Kars	(Netherlands) Amsterdam Tigers
F	24	Akim Ramoul	(Netherlands) Nijmegen Devils
F	26	Jamie Schaafsma	(Italy) HC Bolzano
F	28	Macro Postma	(Netherlands) Nijmegen Devils

=== Poland ===
- Head coach: (Sweden) Peter Ekroth

Pos.	No.	Player	Team
GK	1	Krzysztof Zborowski	(Poland) Podhale Nowy Targ
GK	29	Rafal Radziszewski	(Poland) KS Cracovia Kraków
D	6	Andrzej Banaszczak	(Poland) ZSME Zaglebie Sosnowiec
D	19	Patryk Noworyta	(Poland) KS Cracovia Kraków
D	20	Adam Borzecki	(Germany) EC Bad Tölz
D	22	Jarosław Klys	(Poland) KS Cracovia Kraków
D	23	Grzegorz Piekarski	(Poland) JKH Czarne Jastrzebie
D	24	Sebastian Gonera	(Poland) GKS Tychy
D	28	Mateusz Rompkowski	(Poland) GKS Stoczniowiec Gdańsk
F	8	Blaze Salamon	(Poland) TMH Polonia Bytom
F	9	Damian Slabon	(Poland) KS Cracovia Kraków
F	10	Krzysztof Zapala	(Poland) Podhale Nowy Targ
F	11	Maciej Urbanowicz	(Poland) GKS Stoczniowiec Gdańsk
F	12	Sebastian Kowalowka	(Poland) KS Cracovia Kraków
F	13	Marcin Kolusz	(Poland) Podhale Nowy Targ
F	14	Mariusz Jakubik	(Poland) GKS Tychy
F	15	Leszek Laszkiwicz	(Poland) KS Cracovia Kraków
F	16	Tomasz Malasinski	(Poland) Podhale Nowy Targ
F	18	Krystian Dziubinski	(Poland) Podhale Nowy Targ
F	25	Mikolaj Lopuski	(Poland) GKS Stozniowiec Gdańsk
F	26	Mateusz Danieluk	(Poland) JKH Czame Jastrzebie
F	27	Tomasz Proszkiewicz	(Poland) GKS Tychy

=== Romania ===
- Head coach: (Canada) Thomas Skinner

Pos.	No.	Player	Team
GK	29	Istvan Cergo	(Romania) Steaua București
GK	30	Szabolcs Molnar	(Romania) Progym Gheorgheni
D	2	Istvan Sprencz	(Romania) SC Miercurea Ciuc
D	3	Szaboics Molnar	(Romania) Sportul Studenţesc
D	4	Attila David	(Romania) SC Miercurea Ciuc
D	10	Istvan Antal	(Romania) SC Miercurea Ciuc
D	16	Szabolcs Tanko	(Romania) Fenestela 68 Brașov
D	18	Endre Kosa	(Romania) SC Miercurea Ciuc
D	25	Csaba Nagy	(Romania) Progym Gheorgheni
D	28	Szabolcs Papp	(Romania) SC Miercurea Ciuc
F	6	Tihamer Becze	(Hungary) Budapest Stars
F	7	Csanad Virag	(Romania) HC Csíkszereda
F	9	Catalin Geru	(Romania) Steaua București
F	12	Ciprian Tapu	(Romania) Steaua București
F	13	Leonard Pascaru	(Romania) Steaua București
F	14	Mihail Georgescu	(Romania) Steaua București
F	15	Levente Zsok	(Romania) SC Miercurea Ciuc
F	23	Ervin Moldovan	(Romania) SC Miercurea Ciuc
F	24	Zsolt Molnar	(Romania) HC Csíkszereda
F	26	Attila Imecs	(Hungary) Budapest Stars
F	27	Szabolcs Szocs	(Romania) SC Miercurea Ciuc

=== Ukraine ===
- Head coach: (Ukraine) Oleksandr Seukand

Pos.	No.	Player	Team
GK	1	Igor Karpenko	(Ukraine) Sokil Kyiv
GK	29	Kostiantyn Simchuk	(Russia) Sibir Novosibirsk
D	2	Yuri Gunko	(Ukraine) Sokil Kyiv
D	3	Serhiy Klymentiev	(Russia) Salavat Yulaev Ufa
D	5	Oleg Blagoi	(Belarus) Keramin Minsk
D	6	Andri Sriubko	(Ukraine) Sokil Kyiv
D	14	Yuri Navarenko	(Ukraine) Sokil Kyiv
D	19	Dmytro Yakushyn	(Ukraine) Sokil Kyiv
D	25	Oleksandr Pobiedonostsev	(Ukraine) Sokil Kyiv
D	28	Vitali Lyutkevych	(Ukraine) Sokil Kyiv
F	7	Oleg Shafarenko	(Ukraine) Sokil Kyiv
F	8	Andri Mikhnov	(Russia) Lada Togliatti
F	10	Vadym Shakhraychuk	(Russia) Metallurg Magnitogorsk
F	11	Sergi Kharchenko	(Ukraine) Sokil Kyiv
F	12	Serhiy Varlamov	(Russia) SKA Saint Petersburg
F	13	Artem Gnidenko	(Belarus) HK Vitebsk
F	15	Vitaliy Lytvynenko	(Ukraine) Sokil Kyiv
F	16	Oleh Timchenko	(Belarus) Yunost Minsk
F	17	Yuri Dyachenko	(Ukraine) Sokil Kyiv
F	22	Dmytro Tsyrul	(Ukraine) Sokil Kyiv
F	23	Roman Salnikov	(Ukraine) Sokil Kyiv
F	24	Oleksandr Matviychuk	(Ukraine) Sokil Kyiv

== See also ==
- 2009 IIHF World Championship
