= 2005 IIHF World Championship Division I =

Tournament details
- Host countries: Hungary; Netherlands
- Venue(s): 2 (in 2 host cities)
- Dates: April 17 - April 23
- Teams: 12 (two groups of 6)

The 2005 IIHF World Championship Division I was an international ice hockey tournament run by the International Ice Hockey Federation. The tournament was contested from April 17 to April 23, 2005. Participants in this tournament were separated into two separate tournament groups. The Group A tournament was contested in Debrecen, Hungary. Group B's games were played in Eindhoven, Netherlands. Norway and Italy finished atop of Group A and Group B respectively, gaining promotion to the Championship Division for 2006. While China finished last in Group A and Romania last in Group B and were relegated to Division II for 2006.

== Participants ==
=== Group A ===
Team	2004 Result
Japan	Placed third in the relegation round of the Championship division and was relegated in 2004
Norway	Placed second in Division I Group A in 2004
Poland	Placed third in Division I Group B in 2004
Hungary	Placed fourth in Division I Group A in 2004
Great Britain	Placed fifth in Division I Group A in 2004
China	Placed first in Division II Group A and was promoted in 2004

=== Group B ===
Team	2004 Result
France	Placed fourth in the relegation round of the Championship division and was relegated in 2004
Italy	Placed second in Division I Group B in 2004
Netherlands	Placed third in Division I Group A in 2004
Estonia	Placed fourth in Division I Group B in 2004
Romania	Placed fifth in Division I Group B in 2004
Lithuania	Placed first in Division II Group B and was promoted in 2004

== Group A tournament ==
=== Standings ===
Promoted to the Championship division for 2006
Relegated to Division II for 2006

Rk	Team	GP	W	T	L	GF	GA	GDF	PTS
1	Norway	5	4	1	0	43	8	35	9
2	Poland	5	3	1	1	16	8	8	7
3	Hungary	5	2	2	1	15	6	9	6
4	Japan	5	2	0	3	14	14	0	4
5	Great Britain	5	2	0	3	19	15	4	4
6	China	5	0	0	5	5	61	–56	0

=== Fixtures ===
All times local.

April 17, 2005; 13:00	Great Britain	0 – 2 (0–0, 0–1, 0–1)	Poland	Főnix Hall; Attendance: 300

Game reference
Stephen Murphy	Goalies	Rafał Radziszewski	Referees: (France) Frédéric Bachelet (Slovakia) Peter Ország
0 – 1 / 30:43 - Płachta (Laszkiewicz) (PP); 0 – 2 / 59:44 - Garbocz			Referees: (France) Frédéric Bachelet (Slovakia) Peter Ország
20 min	Penalties	12 min	Referees: (France) Frédéric Bachelet (Slovakia) Peter Ország
26	Shots	41	Referees: (France) Frédéric Bachelet (Slovakia) Peter Ország

April 17, 2005; 16:30	China	1 – 8 (0–2, 1–4, 0–2)	Japan	Fonix Hall; Attendance: 300

Game reference

Zeng Guang
Goalies
Naoya Kikuchi
Referees:
(France) Frédéric Bachelet
(Canada) Guy Pellerin

	0 – 1	1:30 - Nishiwaki (Kobori, Suzuki) (PP)
	0 – 2	12:52 - Kawashima (Fujita, Iwata) (PP)
	0 – 3	20:55 - Kon (Kobori, Suzuki) (PP)
	0 – 4	23:31 - Nishiwaki (Kon, Kobori) (PP)
	0 – 5	34:17 - Kon (Nishiwaki, Suzuki)
	0 – 6	38:10 - Nishiwaki (Kobori, Kon) (PP)
39:05 - Du (Li)	1 – 6
	1 – 7	49:02 - Fujita (Sato) (SH)
	1 – 8	49:51 - Iwata (Okuyama)

18 min
Penalties
14 min
18
Shots
57

April 17, 2005; 20:00	Hungary	2 – 2 (2–1, 0–1, 0–0)	Norway	Fonix Hall; Attendance: 4500

Game reference

Levente Szuper
Goalies
Pål Grotnes
Referees:
(Slovakia) Peter Ország
(Russia) Anatoli Zakharov

3:43 - Erdősi (Csibi)	1 – 0
	1 – 1	4:41 - Knold (Bastiansen, Ask)
17:35 - Ocskay (Svasznek) (PP)	2 – 1
	2 – 2	22:59 - Ask (Bastiansen, Grotnes)

20 min
Penalties
32 min
27
Shots
47

April 18, 2005; 13:00	Poland	9 – 3 (2–1, 5–2, 2–0)	China	Fonix Hall

Game reference

Arkadiusz Sobecki
Goalies
Yu Yang
Referees:
(Russia) Anatoli Zakharov
(France) Frédéric Bachelet

	0 – 1	8:29 - Li (Zhang)
11:08 - Dołęga (Różański, Płachta)	1 – 1
17:03 - Sarnik (Ślusarczyk, Słaboń)	2 – 1
22:54 - Różański (Płachta, Gonera)	3 – 1
24:45 - Sokół (Gabryś, Piotrowski) (PP)	4 – 1
	4 – 2	26:45 - Yang (Wang, Du) (PP)
29:59 - Jaros (Bagiński, Dulęba)	5 – 2
	5 – 3	31:31 - Wang (Du)
35:01 - Różański (PP)	6 – 3
37:07 - Laskiewicz (Gonera, Płachta)	7 – 3
41:09 - Sarnik (Śmiełowski, Ślusarczyk)	8 – 3
45:26 - Garbocz (Laszkiewicz, Gonera) (PP)	9 – 3

10 min
Penalties
24 min
59
Shots
9

April 18, 2005; 16:30	Norway	8 – 3 (4–1, 2–1, 2–1)	Great Britain	Fonix Hall; Attendance: 300

Game reference

Pål Grotnes
Goalies
Stephen Murphy
Joe Watkins
Referees:
(Russia) Anatoli Zakharov
(Canada) Guy Pellerin

9:25 - Ask (Spets)	1 – 0
9:59 - Hansen (Trygg, Spets)	2 – 0
	2 – 1	16:36 - Myers (Tait, Clarke) (PP)
17:10 - Marthinsen (Ask, Bastiansen)	3 – 1
18:04 - Vikingstad (Trygg, Olsen)	4 – 1
22:38 - Skasdammen (Bastiansen, Knold)	5 – 1
24:54 - Knold (Trygg) (PP)	6 – 1
	6 – 2	35:17 - Weaver (Tait, Clarke) (PP)
46:53 - Vikingstad (Olsen, Thoresen) (PP)	7 – 2
	7 – 3	51:59 - Ellis (Clarke) (PP)
57:33 - Hallem (Trygg, Hansen)	8 – 3

24 min
Penalties
28 min
44
Shots
16

April 18, 2005; 20:00	Japan	0 – 3 (0–1, 0–1, 0–1)	Hungary	Fonix Hall; Attendance: 3000

Game reference

Naoya Kikuchi
Goalies
Levente Szuper
Referees:
(Canada) Guy Pellerin
(Slovakia) Peter Ország

0 – 1	18:59 - Szélig (Ladányi) (PP)
0 – 2	37:25 - Ladányi (Peterdi)
0 – 3	57:07 - Ocskay (Palkovics)

18 min
Penalties
18 min
33
Shots
24

April 20, 2005; 13:00	Japan	5 – 3 (0–0, 2–1, 3–2)	Great Britain	Fonix Hall; Attendance: 500

Game reference

Naoya Kikuchi
Goalies
Stephen Murphy
Referees:
(Slovakia) Peter Ország
(France) Frédéric Bachelet

22:59 - Keller (Suzuki, Kobori) (PP)	1 – 0
	1 – 1	28:22 - Shields (Clarke, Ellis) (PP)
30:02 - Osawa (Kon)	2 – 1
	2 – 2	43:24 - Tait
	2 – 3	51:50 - Shields (Ellis) (PP)
57:34 - Sato (Miyauchi)	3 – 3
59:00 - Kon (Nishiwaki, Suzuki)	4 – 3
59:50 - Saito (Iwata)	5 – 3

47 min
Penalties
28 min
40
Shots
21

April 20, 2005; 16:30	Norway	3 – 2 (1–0, 0–1, 2–1)	Poland	Fonix Hall

April 20, 2005; 20:00	China	0 – 9 (0–2, 0–4, 0–3)	Hungary	Fonix Hall

April 22, 2005; 13:00	Norway	25 – 1 (6–0, 9–1, 10–0)	China	Fonix Hall

April 22, 2005; 16:30	Poland	2 – 1 (1–0, 1–0, 0–1)	Japan	Fonix Hall

April 22, 2005; 20:00	Hungary	0 – 3 (0–0, 0–1, 0–2)	Great Britain	Fonix Hall

April 23, 2005; 13:00	Japan	0 – 5 (0–1, 0–2, 0–2)	Norway	Fonix Hall

April 23, 2005; 16:30	Great Britain	10 – 0 (0–0, 6–0, 4–0)	China	Fonix Hall

April 23, 2005; 20:00	Poland	1 – 1 (0–1, 1–0, 0–0)	Hungary	Fonix Hall

=== Scoring leaders ===
List shows the top ten skaters sorted by points, then goals.

Player	GP	G	A	Pts	+/−	PIM	POS
(Norway) Morten Ask	5	6	6	12	+11	18	F
(Norway) Anders Bastiansen	5	5	5	10	+12	0	F
(Norway) Lars Erik Spets	5	4	5	9	+5	12	F
(Norway) Marius Trygg	5	5	3	8	+5	2	F
(Norway) Patrick Thoresen	5	4	4	8	+4	2	F
(Norway) Tore Vikingstad	5	4	4	8	+7	2	F
(United Kingdom) David Clarke	5	2	6	8	–2	4	F
(Norway) Martin Knold	5	4	3	7	+8	4	D
(Poland) Jacek Płachta	5	4	3	7	+4	6	F
(Poland) Leszek Laszkiewicz	5	3	4	7	+4	4	F

=== Leading goaltenders ===
Only the top five goaltenders, based on save percentage, who have played 40% of their team's minutes are included in this list.

Player	MIP	SOG	GA	GAA	SVS%	SO
(Poland) Rafał Radziszewski	238:49	114	5	1.26	95.61	1
(United Kingdom) Stephen Murphy	247:54	158	7	1.69	95.57	2
(Hungary) Levente Szuper	179:25	102	5	1.67	95.10	1
(Norway) Pål Grotnes	299:55	91	8	1.60	91.21	1
(Japan) Naoya Kikuchi	237:46	86	9	2.27	89.53	0

== Group B tournament ==
=== Standings ===
Promoted to the Championship division for 2006
Relegated to Division II for 2006

Rk	Team	GP	W	T	L	GF	GA	GDF	PTS
1	Italy	5	4	1	0	17	3	14	9
2	France	5	3	1	1	16	9	7	7
3	Netherlands	5	1	3	1	13	11	2	5
4	Estonia	5	1	3	1	16	15	1	5
5	Lithuania	5	1	2	2	16	17	–1	4
6	Romania	5	0	0	5	7	30	–23	0

=== Fixtures ===
All times local.

April 17, 2005; 13:00	Estonia	0 – 2 (0–1, 0–1, 0–0)	Italy	Ice Sport Centre

April 17, 2005; 16:30	Romania	3 – 6 (2–0, 1–3, 0–3)	Netherlands	Ice Sport Centre

April 17, 2005; 20:00	Lithuania	3 – 5 (2–4, 0–1, 1–0)	France	Ice Sport Centre

April 18, 2005; 13:00	Italy	7 – 0 (2–0, 2–0, 3–0)	Romania	Ice Sport Centre

April 18, 2005; 16:30	France	3 – 3 (0–2, 2–1, 1–0)	Estonia	Ice Sport Centre

April 18, 2005; 20:00	Netherlands	3 – 3 (1–0, 1–3, 1–0)	Lithuania	Ice Sport Centre

April 20, 2005; 13:00	Lithuania	4 – 4 (1–2, 2–2, 1–0)	Estonia	Ice Sport Centre

April 20, 2005; 16:30	France	6 – 1 (1–0, 3–1, 2–0)	Romania	Ice Sport Centre

April 20, 2005; 20:00	Italy	1 – 1 (0–0, 1–1, 0–0)	Netherlands	Ice Sport Centre

April 22, 2005; 13:00	Italy	5 – 1 (0–0, 5–1, 0–0)	Lithuania	Ice Sport Centre

April 22, 2005; 16:30	Estonia	6 – 3 (3–0, 1–3, 2–0)	Romania	Ice Sport Centre

April 22, 2005; 20:00	Netherlands	0 – 1 (0–0, 0–0, 0–1)	France	Ice Sport Centre

April 23, 2005; 13:00	Romania	0 – 5 (0–1, 0–3, 0–1)	Lithuania	Ice Sport Centre

April 23, 2005; 16:30	France	1 – 2 (0–2, 1–0, 0–0)	Italy	Ice Sport Centre

April 23, 2005; 20:00	Netherlands	3 – 3 (2–2, 0–0, 1–1)	Estonia	Ice Sport Centre

=== Scoring leaders ===
List shows the top ten skaters sorted by points, then goals.

Player	GP	G	A	Pts	+/−	PIM	POS
(Estonia) Eduard Valiulin	5	2	4	6	+4	2	F
(Italy) Dino Felicetti	5	1	5	6	+2	6	F
(Lithuania) Darius Lelenas	5	5	0	5	+1	6	F
(Italy) Roland Ramoser	5	3	2	5	+1	2	F
(Netherlands) David Livingston	5	3	2	5	+1	4	F
(Lithuania) Darius Pliskauskas	5	2	3	5	+1	0	F
(France) François Rozenthal	5	2	3	5	–1	2	F
(Italy) Mario Chitarroni	5	1	4	5	+3	12	F
(Estonia) Lauri Lehesalu	5	0	5	5	0	2	D
(Estonia) Maksim Ivanov	5	4	0	4	+2	4	F

=== Leading goaltenders ===
Only the top five goaltenders, based on save percentage, who have played 40% of their team's minutes are included in this list.

Player	MIP	SOG	GA	GAA	SVS%	SO
(Italy) Jason Muzzatti	240:00	82	3	0.75	96.34	1
(Netherlands) Phil Groeneveld	298:18	187	11	2.21	94.12	0
(France) Fabrice Lhenry	298:49	111	9	1.81	91.89	1
(Estonia) Andrei Šestakov	152:28	74	6	2.36	91.89	1
(Estonia) Aleksei Terentjev	146:50	85	9	3.68	89.41	0
