= Russell Cowley =

- Born: August 12, 1983 (age 41); Edmonton, Alberta, Canada
- Height: 5 ft 11 in (180 cm)
- Weight: 172 lb (78 kg; 12 st 4 lb)
- Position: Forward/Defence
- Shoots: Left
- Played for: Swindon Wildcats; Milton Keynes Lightning; Basingstoke Bison; Coventry Blaze; Cardiff Devils; Swindon Phoenix
- National team: Great Britain
- Playing career: 2000–present

Russell Cowley (born August 12, 1983) is a Canadian-born British professional ice hockey player currently playing for the Swindon Wildcats. He plays either as a forward or more recently as a defenceman.

== Playing career ==
Cowley started his career at Swindon Phoenix in 2000 before joining Coventry Blaze in the BNL in 2001. He stayed with the Blaze as they progressed into the EIHL, and was part of the team that won the Grand Slam (league, challenge cup & playoffs) in 2004–05. He signed for rivals Cardiff Devils in 2006 but returned to Coventry the following season, helping the Blaze to another two league titles in 2008 and 2010.

Cowley played for the England under-18 and under-20 teams in his junior international career, and played on the Great Britain men's national ice hockey team.

Although Cowley usually plays as a forward, he has played a number of games on defence for Coventry over recent seasons and was signed as a full-time defenceman for the 2011/12 season.

In March 2017, Cowley announced his intention to retire.

Despite his retirement announcement, Cowley played for the Basingstoke Bison in the NIHL in the 2018–19 season - a tier below the EIHL, a league in which Cowley had played in for most of his career. A year later, Cowley signed for the Milton Keynes Lightning, whom had recently entered the reformatted NIHL.

== Career statistics ==
=== Regular season & playoffs ===
			Regular season					Playoffs
Season	Team	League	GP	G	A	Pts	PIM	GP	G	A	Pts	PIM
2000–01	Swindon Phoenix	EngL	17	6	10	16	6	2	1	1	2	0
2001–02	Swindon Lynx	EngL	9	8	13	21	2	–	–	–	–	–
2001–02	Coventry Blaze	BNL	20	2	0	2	2	4	0	1	1	2
2002–03	Coventry Blaze	BNL	29	5	5	10	6	10	0	2	2	4
2003–04	Coventry Blaze	EIHL	42	3	6	9	14	4	0	2	2	0
2004–05	Coventry Blaze	EIHL	45	8	14	22	16	10	3	3	6	4
2005–06	Coventry Blaze	EIHL	37	6	16	22	34	6	1	3	4	2
2006–07	Cardiff Devils	EIHL	40	5	10	15	28	4	1	2	3	2
2007–08	Coventry Blaze	EIHL	53	15	35	50	41	4	0	0	0	2
2008–09	Coventry Blaze	EIHL	52	15	30	45	26	3	0	0	0	0
2009–10	Coventry Blaze	EIHL	56	10	31	41	40	3	0	0	0	8
2010–11	Coventry Blaze	EIHL	51	10	21	31	44	2	1	0	1	0
2011–12	Coventry Blaze	EIHL	54	3	15	18	36	2	0	0	0	0
2012–13	Coventry Blaze	EIHL	35	6	10	16	55	3	0	0	0	0
2013–14	Coventry Blaze	EIHL	47	4	12	16	28	2	1	0	1	0
2014–15	Coventry Blaze	EIHL	52	5	12	17	33	4	0	4	4	0
2015–16	Coventry Blaze	EIHL	49	8	11	19	34	4	2	2	4	2
2016–17	Coventry Blaze	EIHL	47	0	9	9	22	–	–	–	–	–
2018–19	Basingstoke Bison	NIHL	38	17	32	49	12	4	0	5	5	0
EIHL totals			641	96	227	323	449	51	9	16	25	20

=== International ===
Year	Team	Comp	GP	G	A	Pts	PIM
2001	Great Britain U18	WJC18–D2	4	2	2	4	14
2001	Great Britain U20	WJC20–D2	4	0	0	0	2
2002	Great Britain U20	WJC20–D2	4	1	3	4	6
2003	Great Britain U20	WJC20–D2	5	7	7	14	2
2003	Great Britain	WC–D1	5	0	0	0	0
2004	Great Britain	WC–D1	5	0	0	0	4
2005	Great Britain	WC–D1	5	0	1	1	2
2006	Great Britain	WC–D1	5	1	3	4	2
2007	Great Britain	WC–D1	5	0	1	1	2
2008	Great Britain	WC–D1	5	0	1	1	2
2009	Great Britain	WC–D1	5	0	4	4	0
2010	Great Britain	WC–D1	5	0	1	1	2
2011	Great Britain	WC–D1	5	1	1	2	2
2015	Great Britain	WC–D1B	5	1	1	2	2
2016	Great Britain	WC–D1B	5	3	3	6	2
2017	Great Britain	WC–D1B	5	1	0	0	2
Junior international totals			17	10	12	22	24
Senior international totals			60	7	17	24	24
