= Matt DeMarchi =

American-born Italian ice hockey player

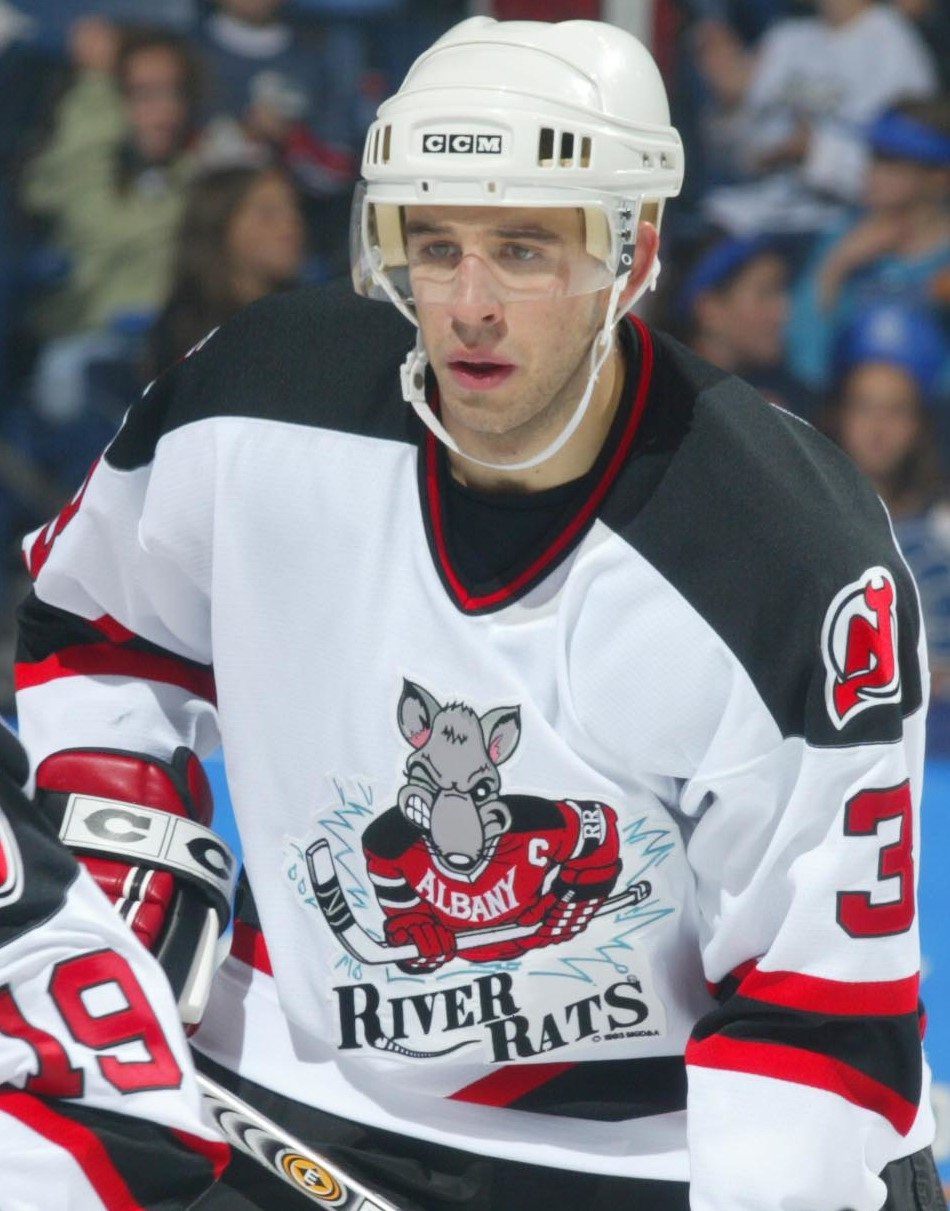
- DeMarchi with the Albany River Rats in 2004
- Born: May 4, 1981 (age 45) Bemidji, Minnesota, U.S.
- Height: 6 ft 3 in (191 cm)
- Weight: 190 lb (86 kg; 13 st 8 lb)
- Position: Defence
- Shot: Left
- Played for: Albany River Rats; Iowa Stars; Bolzano-Bozen Foxes; HC Asiago; Västerås IK; HC Milano
- National team: Italy
- NHL draft: 57th overall, 2000; New Jersey Devils
- Playing career: 2003–2013

Matthew DeMarchi (born May 4, 1981) is an American-born Italian former professional ice hockey player who participated at the 2010 IIHF World Championship as a member of the Italy men's national ice hockey team.

== Playing career ==
=== Amateur ===
DeMarchi played amateur hockey in the United States Hockey League (USHL) with the North Iowa Huskies before attending the University of Minnesota where he played college hockey with the Minnesota Golden Gophers men's ice hockey team from 1999 - 2002.

=== Professional ===
On June 24, 2000, he was selected by New Jersey Devils in the 2nd round (57th overall) of the 2000 NHL entry draft. Following his graduation from university, DeMarchi turned professional playing in the American Hockey League (AHL) with the Albany River Rats from 2003 - 2006. He played the 2006–07 AHL season with the Iowa Stars before relocating to Italy to play Serie A ice hockey for start the 2007–08 season.

DeMarchi started the 2007–08 season with the Bolzano-Bozen Foxes, but was playing with HC Asiago before the end of the season. He remained a member of HC Asiago for 4 seasons before ending his career with one season each with Västerås IK and HC Milano.

=== International ===
In 2010 DeMarchi was named to the Italy men's national ice hockey team and he participated with that team at the 74th World Championship that was held in Germany from May 7–23, 2010.

== Awards and honors ==
Award	Year
All-NCAA All-Tournament Team	2003

== Career statistics ==
=== Regular season and playoffs ===
			Regular season					Playoffs
Season	Team	League	GP	G	A	Pts	PIM	GP	G	A	Pts	PIM
1997–98	North Iowa Huskies	USHL	34	1	2	3	66	10	0	1	1	19
1998–99	North Iowa Huskies	USHL	53	4	14	18	131	—	—	—	—	—
1999–2000	University of Minnesota	WCHA	39	1	6	7	82	—	—	—	—	—
2000–01	University of Minnesota	WCHA	39	4	9	13	149	—	—	—	—	—
2001–02	University of Minnesota	WCHA	36	3	8	11	112	—	—	—	—	—
2002–03	University of Minnesota	WCHA	44	8	9	17	130	—	—	—	—	—
2003–04	Albany River Rats	AHL	52	4	10	14	78	—	—	—	—	—
2004–05	Albany River Rats	AHL	61	1	6	7	85	—	—	—	—	—
2005–06	Albany River Rats	AHL	56	2	11	13	72	—	—	—	—	—
2006–07	Sibir–2 Novosibirsk	RUS.3	6	2	1	3	4	—	—	—	—	—
2006–07	Iowa Stars	AHL	31	1	1	2	18	8	2	2	4	10
2007–08	HC Bolzano	ITA	21	4	5	9	26	—	—	—	—	—
2007–08	Asiago Hockey 1935	ITA	9	1	6	7	10	—	—	—	—	—
2008–09	Asiago Hockey 1935	ITA	42	7	20	27	78	3	0	4	4	10
2009–10	Asiago Hockey 1935	ITA	40	5	18	23	62	12	0	4	4	20
2010–11	Asiago Hockey 1935	ITA	39	4	24	28	103	16	3	13	16	69
2011–12	VIK Västerås HK	Allsv	17	1	5	6	14	6	2	3	5	8
2012–13	Hockey Milano Rossoblu	ITA	43	2	22	24	74	6	2	1	3	4
AHL totals			200	8	28	36	253	8	2	2	4	10
ITA totals			194	23	95	118	353	37	5	22	27	103

=== International ===
Year	Team	Event	GP	G	A	Pts	PIM
2010	Italy	WC	6	0	0	0	10
2011	Italy	WC D1	4	0	2	2	0
2012	Italy	WC	7	2	0	2	14
2013	Italy	OGQ	3	0	1	1	2
Senior totals			20	2	3	5	26
