= Konstantin Pushkaryov =

Kazakh ice hockey player

- Born: February 12, 1985 (age 41) Ust-Kamenogorsk, Kazakh SSR, Soviet Union
- Height: 6 ft 0 in (183 cm)
- Weight: 183 lb (83 kg; 13 st 1 lb)
- Position: Right wing
- Shot: Left
- Played for: HK Almaty; HK Kurbads; Barys Astana; Nomad Astana; Metallurg Magnitogorsk; CSKA Moscow; Los Angeles Kings; Avangard Omsk
- National team: Kazakhstan
- NHL draft: 44th overall, 2003; Los Angeles Kings
- Playing career: 2001–2020

Konstantin Vladimirovich Pushkaryov (Russian: Константин Владимирович Пушкарёв; born February 12, 1985) is a Kazakhstani former ice hockey winger. He played 17 games in the National Hockey League with the Los Angeles Kings during the 2005–06 and 2006–07 seasons. Most of his career, which lasted from 2001 to 2020, was spent with Barys Astana in the Kontinental Hockey League. Internationally, Puskharyov played for the Kazakhstani national team at multiple World Championships. In May 2022, he became a Parimatch expert.

== Playing career ==
Pushkaryov was drafted in the second round of the 2003 NHL entry draft by the Los Angeles Kings, but was traded to the Dallas Stars late in the 2006–07 NHL season in the deal involving former Kings captain Mattias Norström. He played one game for the Kings in the 2005–06 NHL season and earned an assist; he split the 2006–07 NHL season with the Manchester Monarchs of the American Hockey League and the Kings. Pushkaryov scored his first NHL goal on January 8, 2007, against the Edmonton Oilers.

Pushkaryov later signed with Metallurg Magnitogorsk of the KHL, before returning to the AHL's Wilkes-Barre/Scranton Penguins for the 2009–10 season. Before the start of the 2010–11 season, Pushkaryov joined Barys Astana of the KHL.

Pushkaryov played 8 seasons with Barys Astana before leaving as a free agent in signing a one-year contract with HK Kurbads of the Latvian Hockey League on December 20, 2018.

== International ==
Pushkaryov was named to the Kazakhstan men's national ice hockey team for competition at the 2014 IIHF World Championship.

== Career statistics ==
=== Regular season and playoffs ===
			Regular season					Playoffs
Season	Team	League	GP	G	A	Pts	PIM	GP	G	A	Pts	PIM
2000–01	Torpedo–2 Ust–Kamenogorsk	RUS-3	2	0	0	0	2	—	—	—	—	—
2002–03	Kazzinc–Torpedo	RUS-2	4	0	0	0	4	—	—	—	—	—
2002–03	Torpedo–2 Ust–Kamenogorsk	RUS-3	47	19	14	33	50	—	—	—	—	—
2003–04	Avangard Omsk	RSL	5	1	0	1	0	—	—	—	—	—
2003–04	Omskie Yastreby	RUS-3	44	17	14	31	74	4	2	1	3	33
2004–05	Avangard Omsk	RSL	1	0	0	0	0	—	—	—	—	—
2004–05	Omskie Yastreby	RUS-3	3	3	4	7	4	—	—	—	—	—
2004–05	Calgary Hitmen	WHL	69	22	30	52	50	12	2	5	7	4
2005–06	Los Angeles Kings	NHL	1	0	1	1	0	—	—	—	—	—
2005–06	Manchester Monarchs	AHL	77	19	19	38	95	7	1	1	2	4
2006–07	Los Angeles Kings	NHL	16	2	2	4	8	—	—	—	—	—
2006–07	Manchester Monarchs	AHL	35	4	11	15	29	—	—	—	—	—
2006–07	Iowa Stars	AHL	15	2	5	7	25	12	1	4	5	18
2007–08	Iowa Stars	AHL	49	13	27	40	52	—	—	—	—	—
2007–08	CSKA Moscow	RSL	5	0	1	1	2	—	—	—	—	—
2008–09	Metallurg Magnitogorsk	KHL	30	5	1	6	14	4	0	0	0	0
2009–10	Wilkes–Barre/Scranton Penguins	AHL	58	9	10	19	47	4	1	1	2	2
2010–11	Barys Astana	KHL	9	0	1	1	8	—	—	—	—	—
2010–11	Barys–2 Astana	KAZ	35	22	25	47	68	13	2	2	4	40
2011–12	Barys Astana	KHL	20	1	2	3	4	7	2	0	2	2
2011–12	Barys–2 Astana	KAZ	6	5	2	7	20	—	—	—	—	—
2012–13	Barys Astana	KHL	28	4	6	10	42	3	1	0	1	2
2013–14	Barys Astana	KHL	21	1	3	4	33	5	0	1	1	10
2013–14	Nomad Astana	KAZ	5	3	3	6	2	—	—	—	—	—
2014–15	Barys Astana	KHL	54	9	8	17	59	7	3	2	5	7
2015–16	Barys Astana	KHL	55	7	10	17	77	—	—	—	—	—
2016–17	Barys Astana	KHL	32	3	9	12	16	10	2	3	5	10
2017–18	Barys Astana	KHL	47	7	9	16	45	—	—	—	—	—
2017–18	Nomad Astana	KAZ	12	7	2	9	24	12	2	3	5	61
2018–19	HK Kurbads	LAT	14	3	6	9	8	10	1	1	2	6
2019–20	HK Almaty	KAZ	3	0	0	0	12	—	—	—	—	—
KHL totals			296	37	49	86	298	36	8	6	14	31
NHL totals			17	2	3	5	8	—	—	—	—	—

=== International ===
Year	Team	Event	GP	G	A	Pts	PIM
2002	Kazakhstan	WJC18 D1	4	1	3	4	0
2003	Kazakhstan	WJC D1	5	1	1	2	4
2003	Kazakhstan	WJC18	6	9	1	10	6
2011	Kazakhstan	WC D1	5	1	3	4	2
2012	Kazakhstan	WC	7	3	1	4	2
2013	Kazakhstan	WC D1A	5	0	2	2	2
2014	Kazakhstan	WC	5	0	0	0	2
2015	Kazakhstan	WC D1A	4	1	0	1	0
2016	Kazakhstan	WC	6	0	1	1	4
2017	Kazakhstan	WC D1A	5	0	0	0	0
Junior totals			15	11	5	16	10
Senior totals			37	5	7	12	12
