= Alexander Egger (ice hockey) =

Italian ice hockey player

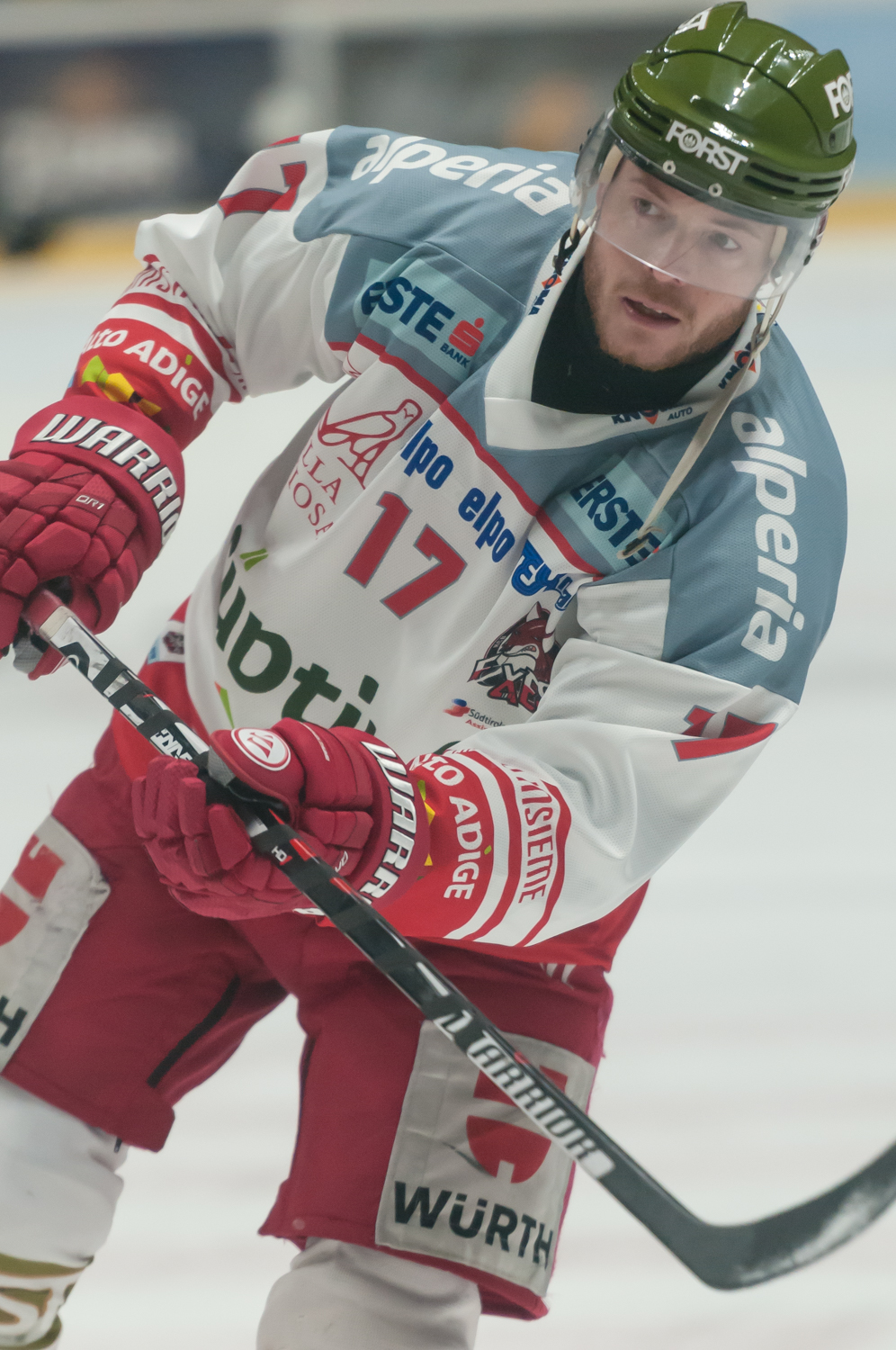
- Born: 22 December 1979 (age 46) Bolzano, Italy
- Height: 6 ft 1 in (185 cm)
- Weight: 194 lb (88 kg; 13 st 12 lb)
- Position: Defense
- Shoots: Left
- EBEL team Former teams: HC Bolzano; Ritten-Renon
- National team: Italy
- Playing career: 1997–present

Alexander Egger (born 22 December 1979) is an Italian professional ice hockey defenseman who is currently Captaining Italian club, HCB South Tyrol in the Austrian Hockey League (EBEL). He also represents the Italian men's National ice hockey team. In the 2013–14 season, Egger led HCB to the EBEL championship in their inaugural Austrian season.

He participated at the 2010 IIHF World Championship, among other international competitions. Egger attended the 2014 Men's World Ice Hockey Championships for Italy in Belarus

At 2017 IIHF World Championships Egger scored on his own empty net. The error briefly received international media attention.
