= István Sofron =

Hungarian ice hockey player (born 1988)

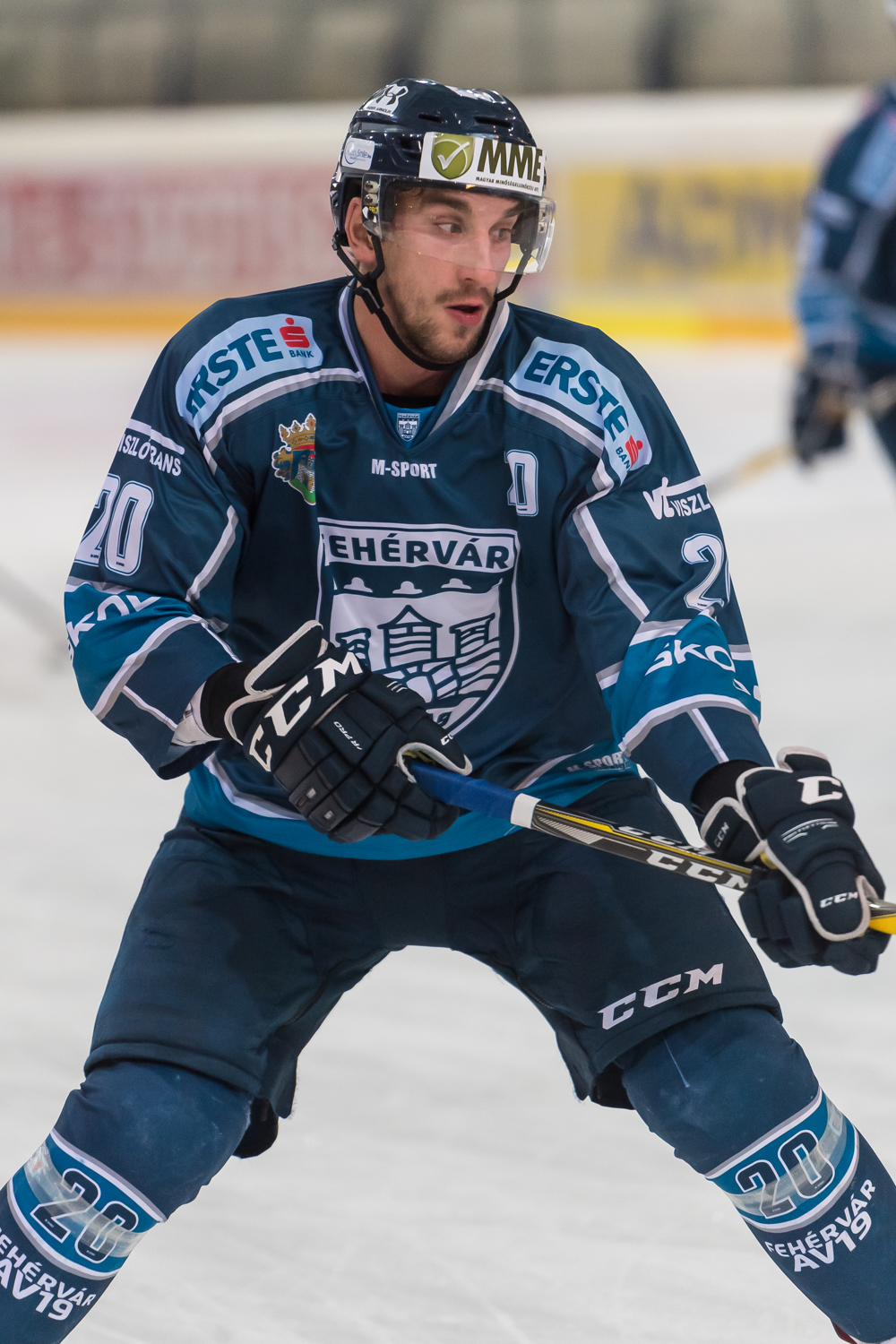
- Sofron in 2016
- Born: 24 February 1988 (age 38) Csíkszereda, Romania
- Height: 6 ft 2 in (188 cm)
- Weight: 194 lb (88 kg; 13 st 12 lb)
- Position: Forward
- Shoots: Left
- ICE Hockey League team Former teams: Ferencvárosi TC; Fehérvári Titánok; Fehérvár AV19; Krefeld Pinguine; EC KAC; Wichita Thunder; EC VSV; MAC Budapest
- National team: Hungary
- NHL draft: Undrafted
- Playing career: 2006–present

István Sofron (born 24 February 1988) is a Romanian-born Hungarian professional ice hockey player who is a forward for Ferencvárosi TC of the ICE Hockey League (ICEHL).

== Playing career ==
He originally played with Alba Volán Székesfehérvár in the Austrian Hockey League. Sofron signed a contract extension with the Transdanubian team in July 2011 and set to play for Alba Volán until 2013.

After six seasons with Székesfehérvár, Sofron left to join German club, Krefeld Pinguine of the DEL, on a two-year contract on 17 May 2013. During the 2015–16 season, his final year with the Pinguine, Sofron left mid-season to rejoin the EBEL, agreeing with EC KAC for the remainder of the campaign.

On 13 June 2016, Sofron made his expected return to Székesfehérvár of the EBEL, signing an optional two-year deal. After just one season with Alba Volan, Sofron opted to accept a North American contract, in agreeing to a one-year deal with the Wichita Thunder of the ECHL on 19 July 2017.

== Awards and achievements ==
- Hungarian Championship:
  - Winner: 2008, 2009, 2010, 2011, 2012

=== Club ===
- Austrian Hockey League Top Scorer: 2012
- Gábor Ocskay Jr. Award (Best Forward of the Hungarian Championship): 2012

=== International ===
- IIHF World Championship Division I Top Scorer: 2011
