= Martin Knold =

Norwegian ice hockey player

- Born: January 14, 1976 (age 49); Fredrikstad, NOR
- Height: 5 ft 11 in (180 cm)
- Weight: 185 lb (84 kg; 13 st 3 lb)
- Position: Defence
- Shot: Left
- Played for: Linköpings HC; Iserlohn Roosters; Herning Blue Fox
- National team: Norway
- Playing career: 1996–2008

Martin Knold (born January 14, 1976, in Fredrikstad, Norway) is a former Norwegian ice hockey player.

Knold began his career with Västra Frölunda, playing for them at junior and under-20 level. He later signed with Linköpings HC of Division 1, ultimately helping the team win promotion to Elitserien. In 2004, Knold joined the Iserlohn Roosters of the Deutsche Eishockey Liga. In 2007, he signed for the Herning Blue Fox in the Oddset Ligaen in Denmark for one season but was unable to play due to injury.

Knold also played for the Norwegian national ice hockey team in eight World Championships.

== Career statistics ==
			Regular season					Playoffs
Season	Team	League	GP	G	A	Pts	PIM	GP	G	A	Pts	PIM
1994–95	Västra Frölunda HC J20	J20 Superelit	20	1	2	3	24	—	—	—	—	—
1995–96	Västra Frölunda HC J20	J20 Superelit	30	8	15	23	16	—	—	—	—	—
1996–97	Linköping HC	Division 1	22	3	1	4	8	13	1	2	3	6
1997–98	Linköping HC	Division 1	29	8	12	20	6	10	0	2	2	2
1998–99	Linköping HC	Division 1	42	7	12	19	20	10	0	1	1	6
1999–00	Linköping HC	Elitserien	26	3	2	5	16	—	—	—	—	—
2000–01	Linköping HC	HockeyAllsvenskan	34	6	10	16	30	9	2	3	5	6
2001–02	Linköping HC	Elitserien	44	1	9	10	32	—	—	—	—	—
2002–03	Linköping HC	Elitserien	37	2	1	3	26	—	—	—	—	—
2003–04	Linköping HC J20	J20 Superelit	2	3	1	4	2	—	—	—	—	—
2003–04	Linköping HC	Elitserien	34	6	4	10	20	5	0	1	1	0
2004–05	Iserlohn Roosters	DEL	50	16	20	36	18	—	—	—	—	—
2005–06	Iserlohn Roosters	DEL	32	3	9	12	34	—	—	—	—	—
2006–07	Iserlohn Roosters	DEL	18	1	3	4	12	—	—	—	—	—
Elitserien totals			141	12	16	28	94	5	0	1	1	0
DEL totals			100	20	32	52	64	—	—	—	—	—
