= Matej Hočevar =

Slovenian ice hockey player

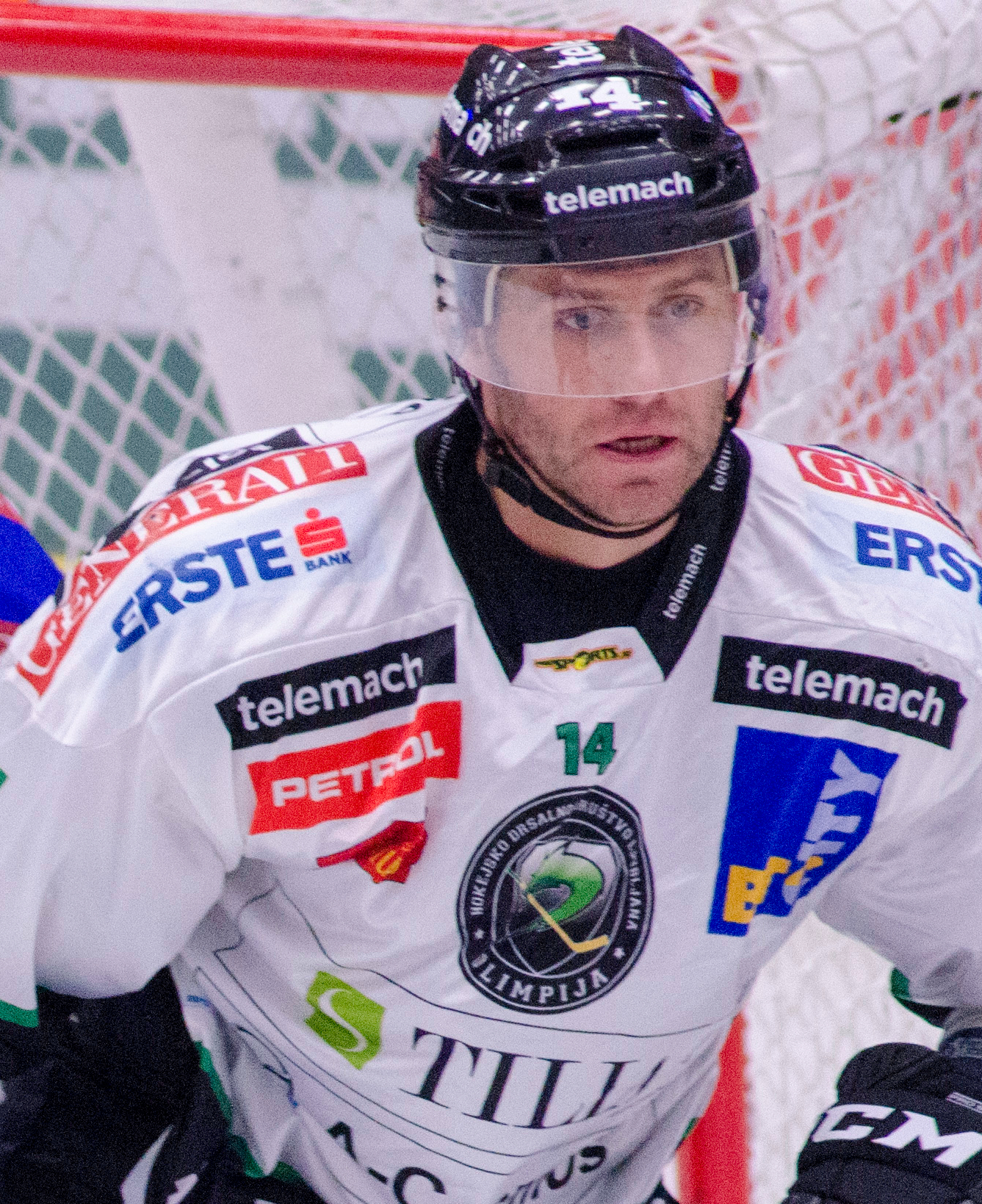
- Born: 30 April 1982 (age 43) Ljubljana, SFR Yugoslavia
- Height: 5 ft 10 in (178 cm)
- Weight: 174 lb (79 kg; 12 st 6 lb)
- Position: Forward
- Shoots: Right
- EBEL team Former teams: HDD Olimpija Ljubljana; HK Slavija
- National team: Slovenia
- Playing career: 2001–present

Matej Hočevar (born Ljubljana, 30 April 1982) is a Slovenian professional ice hockey player currently with HDD Olimpija Ljubljana of the Austrian Hockey League (EBEL). He participated at the 2011 IIHF World Championship as a member of the Slovenia men's national ice hockey team.
