= Georgi Petrov (ice hockey) =

Kazakhstani ice hockey player

- Born: 19 August 1988 (age 36); Ust-Kamenogorsk, Kazakh SSR, Soviet Union
- Position: Defence
- National team: Kazakhstan
- NHL draft: Undraftet

Georgi Petrov (Russian: Георгий Юрьевич Петров; born 19 August 1988) is a Kazakh professional ice hockey defenceman who participated at the 2010 IIHF World Championship as a member of the Kazakhstan men's national ice hockey team.
