= Jeff Hutchins =

Canadian-British ice hockey player and coach

- Born: 23 April 1978 (age 48) Toronto, Ontario, Canada
- Height: 5 ft 11 in (180 cm)
- Weight: 201 lb (91 kg; 14 st 5 lb)
- Position: Left wing
- Shot: Left
- Played for: Mississippi Sea Wolves; Houston Aeros; Rochester Americans; Grand Rapids Griffins; Bridgeport Sound Tigers; Coventry Blaze; Belfast Giants; Newcastle Vipers; Bracknell Bees; Edinburgh Capitals; Sheffield Steelers; Dundee Stars
- Current SNL coach: Dundee Rockets
- National team: Great Britain
- Playing career: 2002–2015
- Coaching career: 2016–present

Jeff Hutchins (born 23 April 1978) is a Canadian-British former professional ice hockey left winger who is currently the head coach of SNL side Dundee Rockets, having taken on the role in 2024.

== Career ==
Hutchins played in the EIHL for the Coventry Blaze, Belfast Giants, Newcastle Vipers, Edinburgh Capitals, Sheffield Steelers and Dundee Stars. He also played for the Great Britain national ice hockey team.

== Managing career ==
Hutchins was player-coach of the Dundee Stars between 2012 and 2015. He retired as a player in 2015 after becoming head coach of China Dragon in Asia League Ice Hockey.

Ahead of the 2016-17 season, Hutchins joined the Fife Flyers as an assistant coach to Todd Dutiaume. In June 2022, Hutchins' Fife role changed slightly with him being named Associate Coach to Dutiaume.

In June 2023, Hutchins - and long-time Fife head coach Todd Dutiaume - announced their intentions to step down from their coaching roles with immediate effect.

In June 2024, Hutchins was announced as the manager of the newly reformed Dundee Rockets. He led the side to that season’s SNL league title before also securing the Scottish Cup.
