= Diego Iori =

Italian ice hockey player

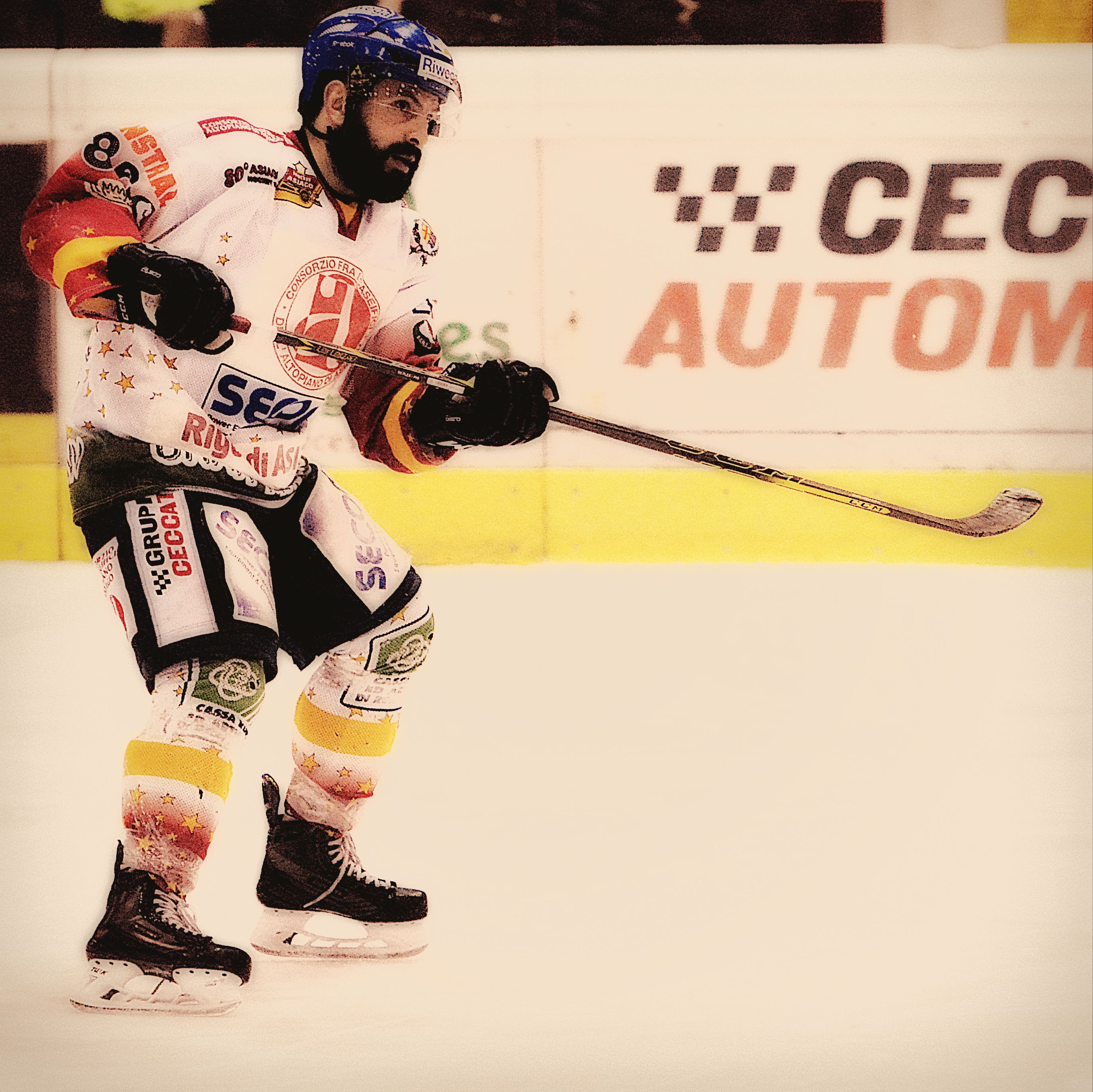
- Diego Lori 2015.jpg
- Born: May 20, 1986 (age 38); Cavalese, Italy
- Height: 5 ft 9 in (175 cm)
- Weight: 198 lb (90 kg; 14 st 2 lb)
- Position: Forward
- Shoots: Right
- Serie A team: HC Fassa
- National team: Italy
- Playing career: 2003–present

Diego Iori (born May 20, 1986) is an Italian professional ice hockey player who is currently playing for the HC Fassa of the Serie A. Iori competed in the 2012 IIHF World Championship as a member of the Italy men's national ice hockey team.
