= András Horváth (ice hockey) =

Hungarian ice hockey player

Andras Horvath
- Born: April 8, 1976 (age 48); Budapest, Hungary
- Height: 6 ft 3 in (191 cm)
- Weight: 209 lb (95 kg; 14 st 13 lb)
- Position: Defence
- Shot: Right
- Played for: Dunaújvárosi Acélbikák; Ujpesti TE; Alba Volán Székesfehérvár; Ferencvárosi TC
- Playing career: 1994–2015

Andras Horvath (born April 8, 1976) is a Hungarian former professional ice hockey defenceman. He played for Dunaújvárosi Acélbikák, Újpesti TE, Alba Volán Székesfehérvár and Ferencvárosi TC (ice hockey).

Horvath played in the 2009 IIHF World Championship for the Hungary national team.

== Career statistics ==
=== Austrian Hockey League ===
	Seasons	GP	Goals	Assists	Pts	PIM
Regular season	4	195	15	51	66	291
Playoffs	1	5	0	1	1	6
