= Csaba Kovács =

Hungarian ice hockey player (born 1984)

Csaba Kovacs
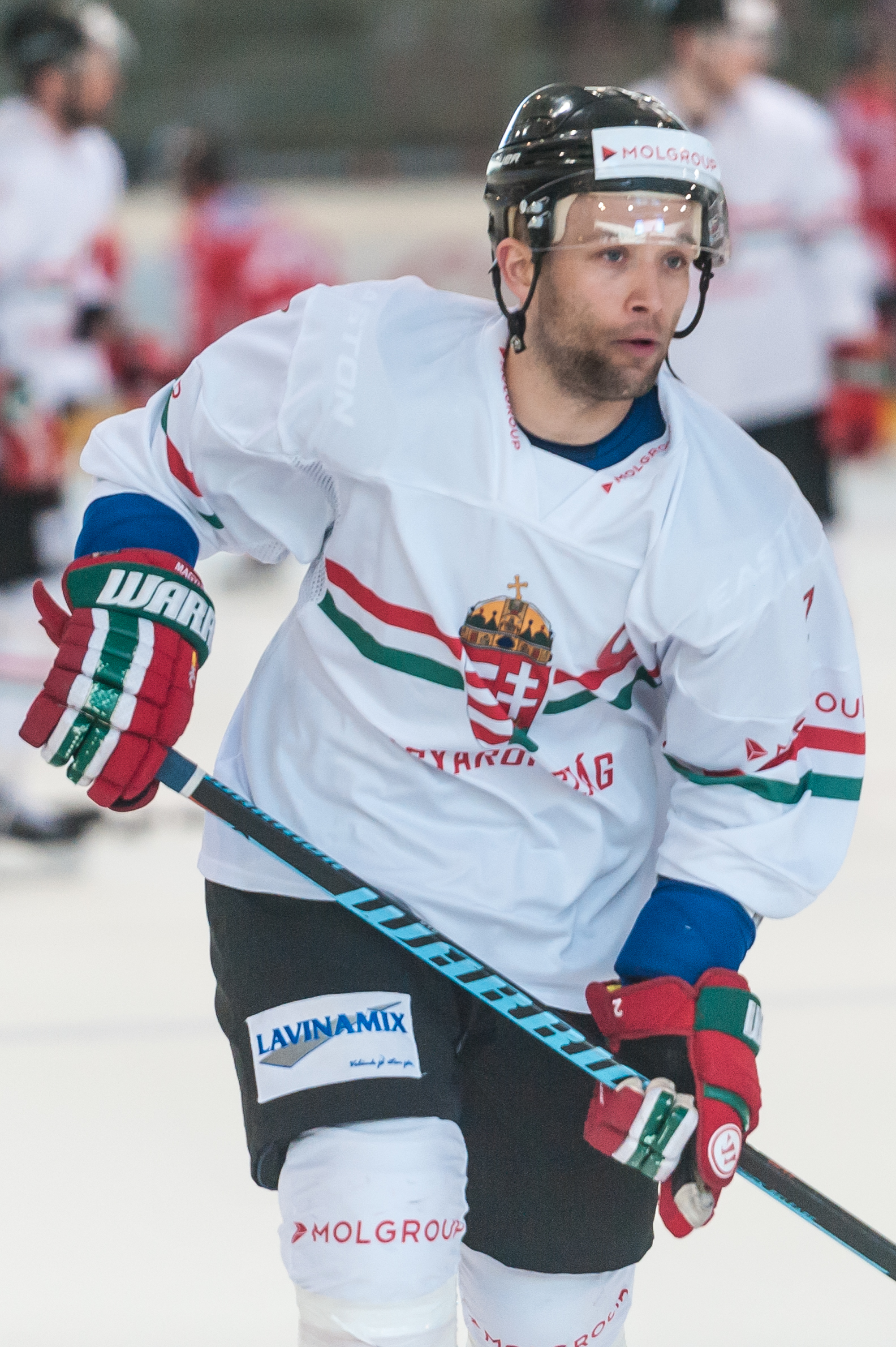
- Born: 18 March 1984 (age 41); Budapest, Hungary
- Height: 6 ft 0 in (183 cm)
- Weight: 156 lb (71 kg; 11 st 2 lb)
- Position: Left wing
- Shoots: Left
- Erste Liga team Former teams: Újpesti TE; Alba Volán Székesfehérvár; MAC Budapest
- National team: Hungary
- NHL draft: Undrafted
- Playing career: 2002–present

Csaba Kovacs (born 18 March 1984) is a Hungarian professional ice hockey player who is currently playing with Újpesti TE of the Erste Liga. He previously spent the entirety of his career with Alba Volán Székesfehérvár who competed in the Austrian Hockey League (EBEL) before joining MAC Budapest in 2016.

== Career statistics ==
=== Austrian Hockey League ===
	Seasons	GP	Goals	Assists	Pts	PIM
Regular season	4	196	44	59	103	92
Playoffs	1	5	1	0	1	4
