= Andrei Gavrilin =

Kazakh ice hockey player (born 1978)

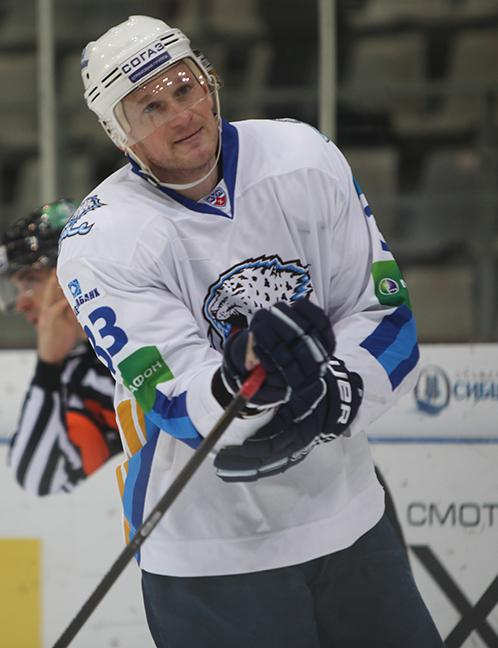
- Gavrilin with Barys Astana in 2013.
- Born: July 24, 1978 (age 47) Temirtau, KAZ
- Height: 6 ft 1 in (185 cm)
- Weight: 191 lb (87 kg; 13 st 9 lb)
- Position: Right wing
- Shot: Left
- Played for: Avangard Omsk; Traktor Chelyabinsk; HC Lipetsk; Kazakhmys Karagandy; Barys Astana
- National team: Kazakhstan
- NHL draft: Undrafted
- Playing career: 1997–2015

Andrei Yurevich Gavrilin (Russian: Андрей Юрьевич Гаврилин; born July 24, 1978) is a Kazakhstani former professional ice hockey winger who last played for Barys Astana of the Kontinental Hockey League (KHL).

== Career ==
Gavrilin began his career with Avangard Omsk in 1997, but played just 3 games with the club before being demoted to the Vysshaya Liga the next season. He then played five years with HC Lipetsk before returning to Kazakhstan with Kazakhmys Karagandy in 2004. In 2007-08, he joined Barys Astana, and had a career year, scoring 21 goals and 48 points in the Vysshaya Liga, helping the club earn a promotion to the Kontinental Hockey League the following season.

== International ==
Gavrilin participated at the 2010 IIHF World Championship as a member of the Kazakhstan men's national ice hockey team, recording 1 assist in 6 games. He also competed for Kazakhstan at the 2014 IIHF World Championship.

== Career statistics ==
			Regular season					Playoffs
Season	Team	League	GP	G	A	Pts	PIM	GP	G	A	Pts	PIM
1994–95	Avangard Omsk-2	Russia2	12	0	1	1	4	—	—	—	—	—
1995–96	Avangard Omsk-2	Russia2	42	7	6	13	24	—	—	—	—	—
1996–97	Avangard Omsk	Russia	2	0	0	0	0	—	—	—	—	—
1996–97	Avangard Omsk-2	Russia3	36	10	12	22	26	—	—	—	—	—
1997–98	Avangard Omsk	Russia	3	0	0	0	0	—	—	—	—	—
1998–99	Avangard Omsk-2	Russia3	4	2	1	3	4	—	—	—	—	—
1998–99	Traktor Chelyabinsk	Russia	8	0	1	1	6	—	—	—	—	—
1998–99	HK Lipetsk	Russia	21	1	1	2	12	3	0	0	0	0
1999–00	HK Lipetsk	Russia	26	1	0	1	16	—	—	—	—	—
1999–00	HK Lipetsk-2	Russia3	12	6	6	12	12	—	—	—	—	—
2000–01	HK Lipetsk	Russia2	43	12	5	17	34	—	—	—	—	—
2001–02	HK Lipetsk	Russia2	50	8	10	18	16	14	1	3	4	10
2002–03	HK Lipetsk	Russia2	45	11	14	25	16	—	—	—	—	—
2003–04	HK Lipetsk	Russia2	56	11	15	26	42	—	—	—	—	—
2004–05	Kazakhmys Karaganda	Kazakhstan	24	4	9	13	8	—	—	—	—	—
2004–05	Kazakhmys Karaganda	Russia2	45	4	6	10	14	—	—	—	—	—
2005–06	Kazakhmys Karaganda	Kazakhstan	12	4	5	9	2	—	—	—	—	—
2005–06	Kazakhmys Karaganda	Russia2	29	4	6	10	20	—	—	—	—	—
2005–06	Kazakhmys Karaganda-2	Russia3	5	5	1	6	2	—	—	—	—	—
2006–07	Kazakhmys Satpaev	Kazakhstan	19	7	10	17	16	—	—	—	—	—
2006–07	Kazakhmys Satpaev	Russia2	47	8	16	24	38	—	—	—	—	—
2007–08	Barys Astana	Russia2	52	21	27	48	44	7	0	1	1	10
2008–09	Barys Astana	KHL	43	5	18	23	20	3	0	0	0	6
2009–10	Barys Astana	KHL	56	7	17	24	32	3	0	1	1	2
2009–10	Barys Astana-2	Kazakhstan	1	1	0	1	0	—	—	—	—	—
2010–11	Barys Astana	KHL	47	9	14	23	36	4	0	0	0	6
2011–12	Barys Astana	KHL	43	2	8	10	36	7	3	2	5	0
2012–13	Barys Astana	KHL	32	5	5	10	16	—	—	—	—	—
2013–14	Barys Astana	KHL	40	0	6	6	16	10	1	2	3	2
2014–15	Barys Astana	KHL	51	0	5	5	34	6	0	0	0	2
KHL totals			312	28	73	101	190	33	4	5	9	18
