= David Longstaff =

British ice hockey player

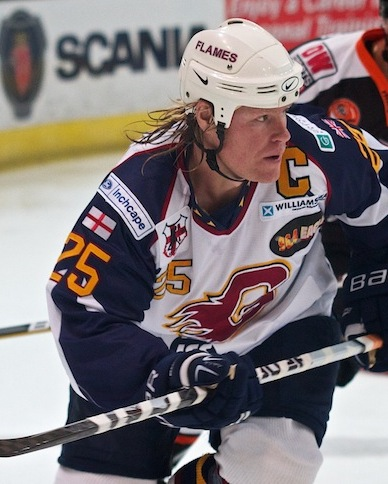
- Born: 26 August 1974 (age 51) Whitley Bay, England
- Height: 6 ft 2 in (188 cm)
- Weight: 225 lb (102 kg; 16 st 1 lb)
- Position: Forward
- Shot: Right
- NIHL team Former teams: Whitley Warriors; Guildford Flames, Sheffield Steelers, Newcastle Warriors, Djurgården, Manchester Storm, Newcastle Vipers, Sierre
- National team: Great Britain
- Playing career: 1989–2019

David Longstaff (born 26 August 1974) is a British former ice hockey forward.

After starting his career with his hometown club, Whitley Bay Warriors, Longstaff moved to the Sheffield Steelers in 1995, enjoying several victories and success in a variety of league and play-off games. Longstaff has previously been awarded Young Player of the Year and Superleague Player of the Year. Longstaff then moved to Sweden in 2001, spending one season in the Elitserien with Djurgårdens IF before returning to the UK, signing with the Newcastle Vipers in 2002. He also had brief spells with the Manchester Storm and in Switzerland with HC Sierre-Anniviers. He returned to the Vipers in 2003 before joining the Guildford Flames for the 2010/11 season. Longstaff became the first man to reach 100 caps for Great Britain on 10 November against Romania in a 3–0 win in the qualifiers for the Winter Olympics.

David has since left the Guildford Flames and returned home to the North East in 2015, where he is now head coach for the Whitley Warriors.

David is the father of Leeds United footballer Sean Longstaff and CF Montréal footballer Matty Longstaff, and a cousin of former England international footballer Alan Thompson.

Longstaff was one of three Ice Hockey figures inducted into the British Ice Hockey Hall of Fame in 2022.
