= Thomas Tragust =

Italian ice hockey player

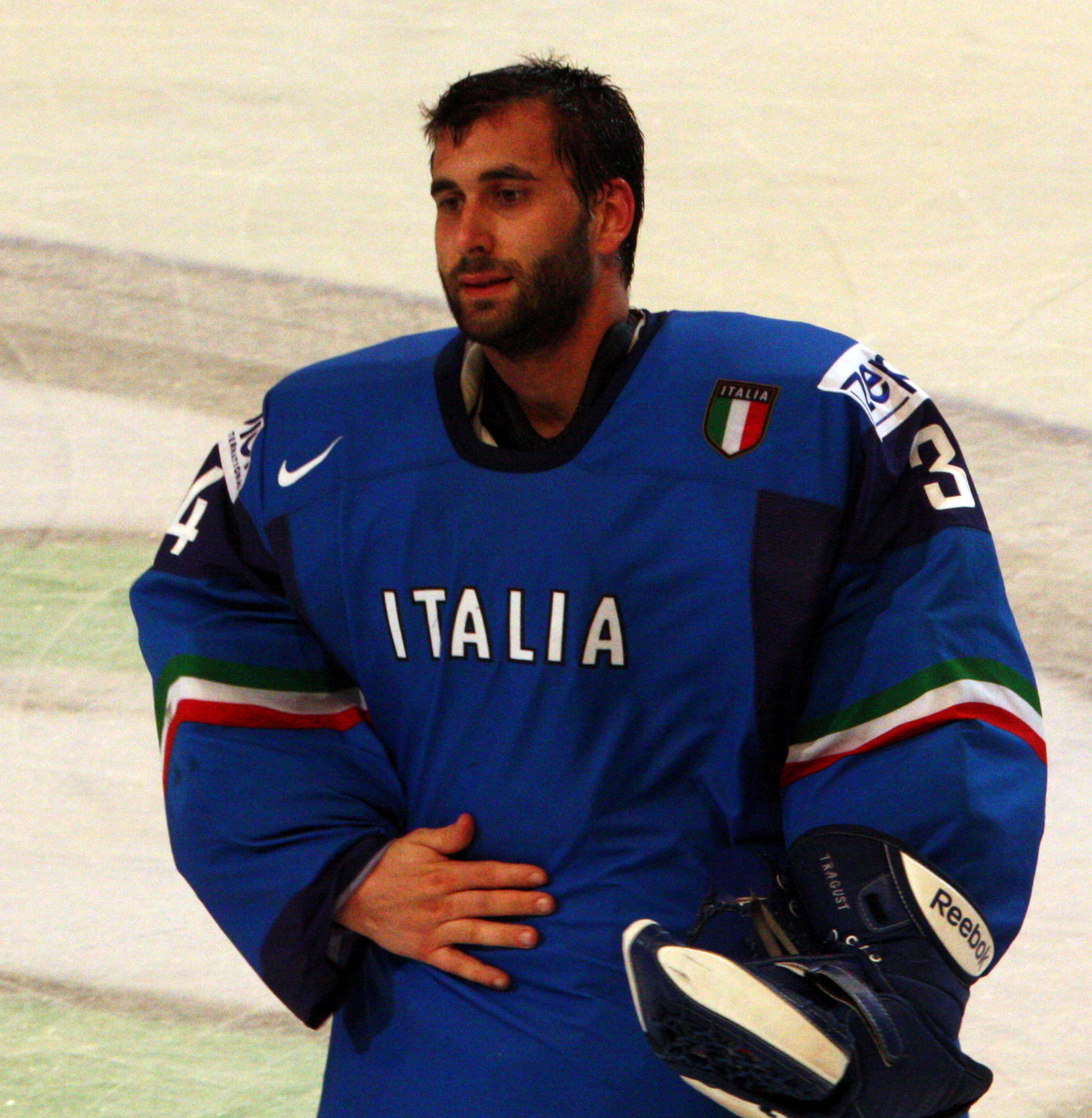
- Born: May 28, 1986 (age 38); Schlanders, Italy
- Height: 5 ft 10 in (178 cm)
- Weight: 163 lb (74 kg; 11 st 9 lb)
- Position: Goaltender
- NAHL team: Texas Tornado
- National team: Italy
- NHL draft: Undrafted
- Playing career: 2003–present

Thomas Tragust is a goaltender for Italy at the 2006 Men's World Ice Hockey Championships and the Texas Tornado of the NAHL. He participated at three IIHF World Championships as a member of the Italian National men's ice hockey team.

== Career ==
=== Before North America ===
Tragust began to play ice hockey in Latsch, Italy, until he was eleven years old. Afterwards, he played for Meran. In 2003, he debuted in the A1 series, the premier ice hockey league in Italy, where in his first game he recorded a 6-0 shutout. He led the team to two national championships. In 2005, he played for Italy at the IIHF World U-20 Hockey Championship in Division I. He missed out on selection for the 2006 Winter Olympics held in Turin, but in the 2006 IIHF World Championship, Tragust was on the roster and got his break in the final game, when they were risking demotion to Group B. Italy was down 3-0 to Slovenia when head coach Mickey Goulet pulled veteran Jason Muzzatti in favour of Tragust, who ended up helping the Italians to tie the game. After Tragust left Meran, the team dropped to the second division.

=== North America and return to Italy ===
He was the starting goalie for the Texas Tornado. Having attended development camp with the Buffalo Sabres, he is seeking to further his professional career, possibly playing in the NHL. He returned to his native land to play for HC Fassa. He also played for Italy at the 2008 and 2012 World Championships (four matches at each tournament, all defeats), and was on the roster for the 2010 edition but did not make an appearance (other than in 2007, when he was not selected, Italy did not qualify for the elite level world finals in the odd-numbered years of that period, nor for the 2010 Winter Olympics).
