= Armin Hofer =

Italian ice hockey player

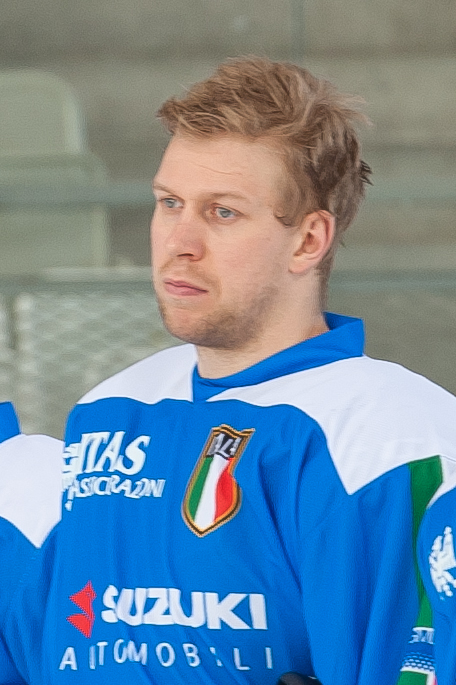
- Armin Hofer in 2015
- Born: March 19, 1987 (age 38); Bruneck, Italy
- Height: 6 ft 0 in (183 cm)
- Weight: 198 lb (90 kg; 14 st 2 lb)
- Position: Defence
- Shoots: Right
- Serie A team: HC Pustertal Wölfe
- National team: Italy
- NHL draft: Undrafted
- Playing career: 2004–present

Armin Hofer (born March 19, 1987) is an Italian professional ice hockey defenceman. He is currently playing with the HC Pustertal Wölfe in the Italian Serie A.

He participated at the 2010 IIHF World Championship as a member of the Italian National men's ice hockey team.
