= Jason Hewitt =

- Born: 28 August 1983 (age 43) Manchester, England
- Height: 5 ft 8 in (173 cm)
- Weight: 188 lb (85 kg; 13 st 6 lb)
- Position: Forward
- Shoots: Right
- NIHL team Former teams: Hull Seahawks; Manchester Phoenix; London Racers; Basingstoke Bison; Hull Pirates; Sheffield Steelers
- National team: Great Britain
- Playing career: 2000–present

Jason Hewitt (born 28 August 1983 in Manchester, England) is an English professional ice hockey player currently playing for the Hull Seahawks in the NIHL.

== Career stats ==
			Regular season					Playoffs				
Season	Team	League	GP	G	A	Pts	PIM	GP	G	A	Pts	PIM
2003–04	Telford Wild Foxes	EPL	1	0	0	0	46	-	-	-	-	-
2003–04	Manchester Phoenix	EIHL	56	1	2	3	52	6	1	1	2	0
2004–05	London Racers	EIHL	48	7	2	9	79	-	-	-	-	-
2005–06	London Racers	EIHL	23	5	4	9	30	-	-	-	-	-
2005–06	Basingstoke Bison	EIHL	9	0	0	0	4	-	-	-	-	-
2005–06	Sheffield Steelers	EIHL	19	0	3	3	26	-	-	-	-	-
2006–07	Sheffield Steelers	EIHL	52	8	9	17	100	-	-	-	-	-
2007–08	Sheffield Steelers	EIHL	48	8	8	16	96	4	1	1	2	0
2008–09	Sheffield Steelers	EIHL	52	8	10	18	42	4	0	2	2	8
2009–10	Sheffield Steelers	EIHL	51	11	12	23	160	-	-	-	–	-
2010–11	Sheffield Steelers	EIHL	53	14	28	42	118	-	-	-	-	-
2011–12	Sheffield Steelers	EIHL	54	10	21	31	105	-	-	-	-	-
2012–13	Sheffield Steelers	EIHL	60	7	17	24	69	2	1	0	1	6
2013–14	Sheffield Steelers	EIHL	64	9	16	25	91	4	1	1	2	6
2014–15	Sheffield Steelers	EIHL	52	7	12	19	60	4	0	0	0	6
