= Armin Helfer =

Italian ice hockey player (born 1980)

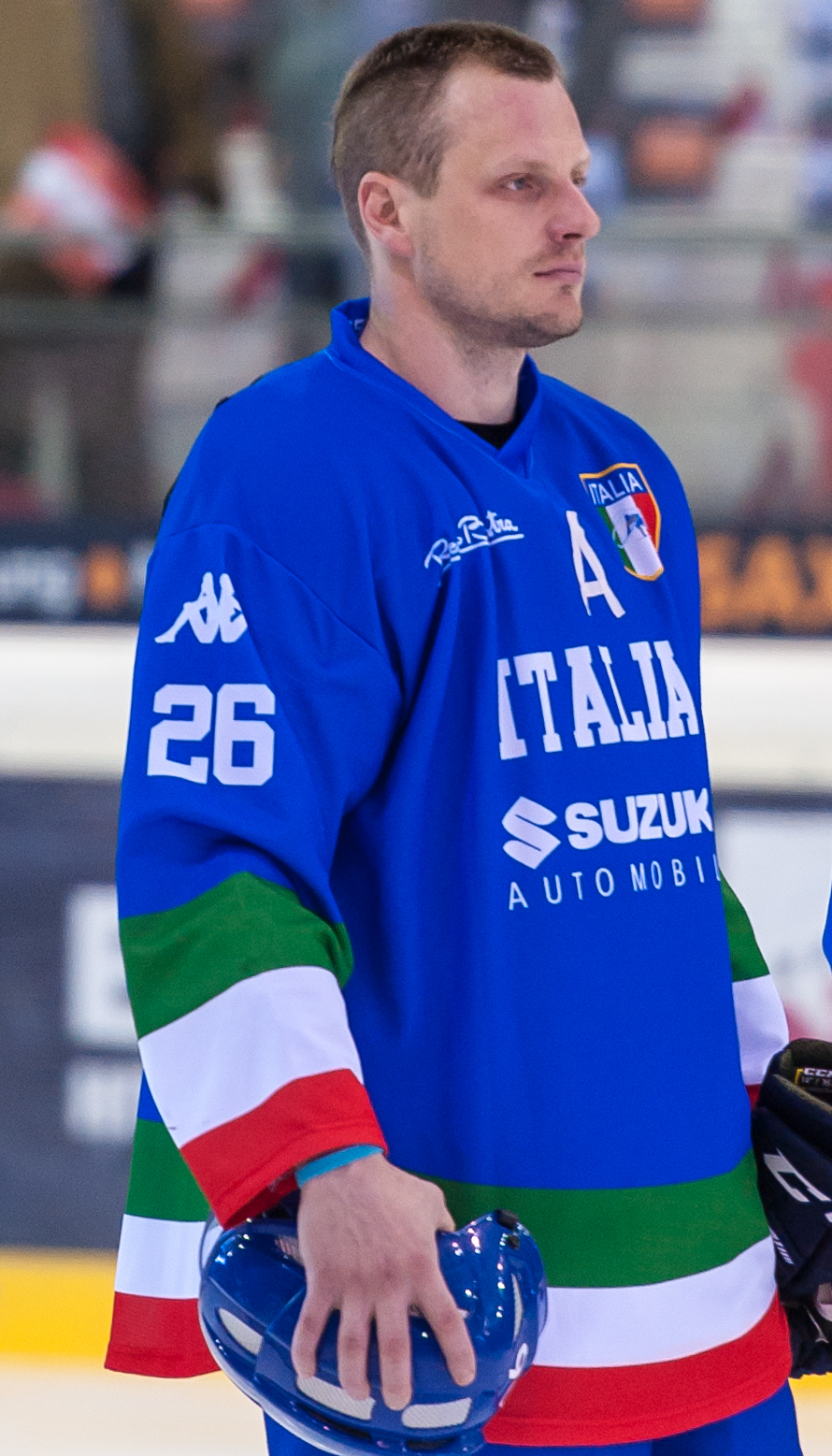
- Born: May 31, 1980 (age 44); Bruneck, Italy
- Height: 6 ft 2 in (188 cm)
- Weight: 200 lb (91 kg; 14 st 4 lb)
- Position: Defence
- Shot: Left
- Played for: Brunico SG; HC Milano; HC TWK Innsbruck; Kloten Flyers; HC Pustertal Wölfe
- National team: Italy
- Playing career: 1996–2020

Armin Helfer (born May 31, 1980) is a former Italian professional ice hockey defenceman. Last he played for the HC Pustertal Wölfe of the Alps Hockey League.

He participated at the 2010 IIHF World Championship as a member of the Italian National men's ice hockey team.
