= Kostiantyn Simchuk =

Ukrainian ice hockey player

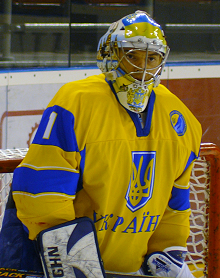
- Simchuk in 2010.
- Born: February 26, 1974 (age 51); Kyiv, Ukrainian SSR, Soviet Union
- Height: 6 ft 0.5 in (184 cm)
- Weight: 190 lb (86 kg; 13 st 8 lb)
- Position: Goaltender
- Shot: Left
- KHL team Former teams: HC Budivelnyk; Sokil Kyiv; HC Sibir Novosibirsk; Spartak Moscow; CSKA Moscow; THK Tver; Metallurg Magnitogorsk; Salavat Yulaev
- National team: Ukraine
- Playing career: 1993–2013

Kostiantyn Mykolaiovych "Konstantin" Simchuk (Ukrainian: Костянтин Миколайович Сімчук; born February 26, 1974) is a former Ukrainian professional ice hockey goaltender. He was named best goaltender at the B Pool of the 1994 World Junior Ice Hockey Championships held in Bucharest, Romania. Now retired from his professional career, he focuses on coaching.
