= Phil Hill (ice hockey) =

Welsh ice hockey player

- Born: 23 May 1982 (age 42); Cardiff, WAL
- Height: 6 ft 3 in (191 cm)
- Weight: 194 lb (88 kg; 13 st 12 lb)
- Position: Forward
- Shoots: Right
- EIHL team Former teams: Cardiff Devils; Sheffield Steelers
- National team: Great Britain
- Playing career: 2000–present

Phil Hill (born 23 May 1982) is a Welsh professional ice hockey player currently playing for the Cardiff Devils of the Elite Ice Hockey League. He is also a member of the Great Britain national ice hockey team.
