= Oleg Shafarenko =

Ukrainian ice hockey player

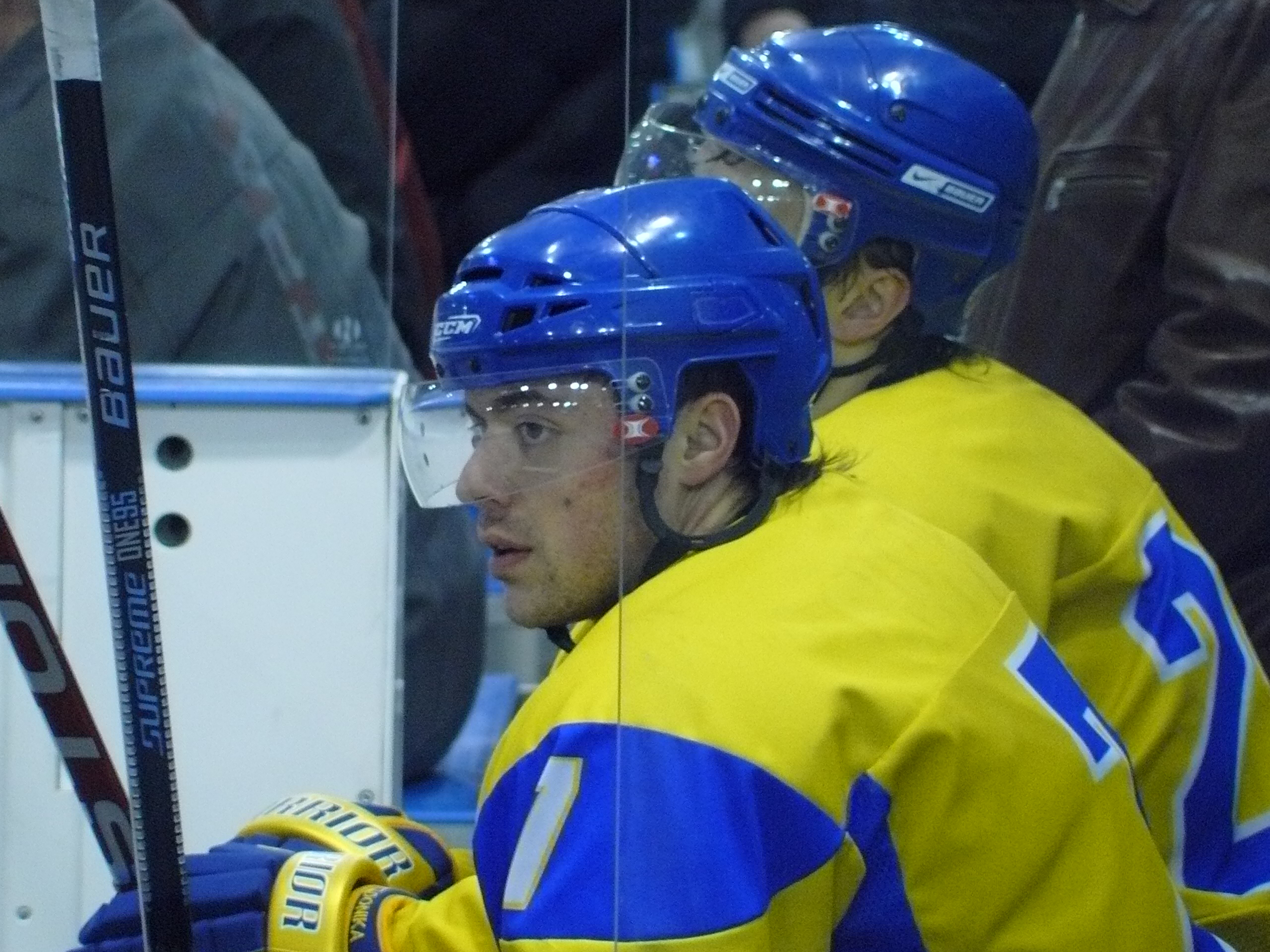
- Born: October 31, 1981 (age 44) Kyiv, Ukrainian SSR, Soviet Union
- Height: 5 ft 11 in (180 cm)
- Weight: 185 lb (84 kg; 13 st 3 lb)
- Position: Forward
- Shot: Left
- VHL team: HC Donbass
- National team: Ukraine
- NHL draft: Undrafted
- Playing career: 2001–2017
Medal record
Men's ice hockey
Representing Ukraine
Winter Universiade
Bronze medal – third place	2001 Zakopane	Team

Oleh Leonidovych "Oleg" Shafarenko (Ukrainian: Олег Леонідович Шафаренко; born October 31, 1981) is a Ukrainian former ice hockey player. He last played for HC Donbass of the Ukrainian Hockey Championship.

== Career highlights ==
- 2008–2009 World Championship (Div. 1B) Silver Medal
- 2009–2010 World Championship (Div. 1A) Silver Medal
- 2010–2011 Continental Cup Champion; World Championship (Div. 1B) Silver Medal

== Transactions ==
Date	Status	From	To
07/09/2009	Confirmed	Sokil Kyiv	Dinamo Minsk
