= Phil Groeneveld =

Canadian-Dutch ice hockey player

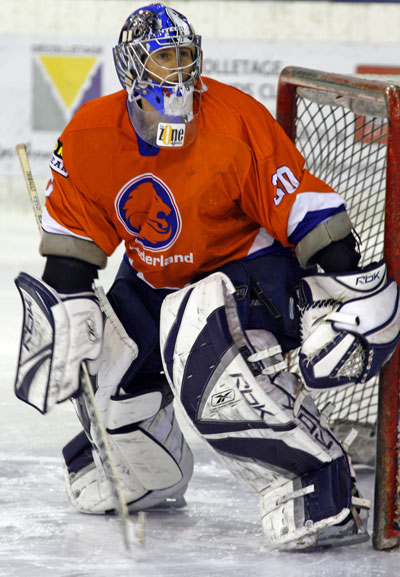
- Born: September 18, 1974 (age 51) Oshawa, Ontario, Canada
- Height: 6 ft 0 in (183 cm)
- Weight: 190 lb (86 kg; 13 st 8 lb)
- Position: Goaltender
- Caught: Left
- Serie A team Former teams: Hockey Club Alleghe; Sportverein Ritten-Renon; Bolzano-Bozen Foxes
- National team: Netherlands
- Playing career: 1995–2009

Phil Groeneveld (born September 18, 1974) is a Canadian-Dutch retired professional ice hockey goaltender. He last played for HC Alleghe in Italy's Serie A league, and retired in 2009.

== Career ==
Born in Oshawa, Ontario, Groeneveld has played for clubs in France, the Netherlands, and Italy. A 6 ft 0 in (183 cm), 190 lb (86 kg) goaltender, Groeneveld attended Ohio State University for a brief time however began his pro career in the United States in 1995 with the Wichita Thunder. Later in the same season, he joined the Fort Worth Fire, also of the CHL, where he scored the first ever goalie goal in league history. The following season he joined French club Viry-Châtillon EH where he remained for two years before joining a second French team, Rouen HE 76, for whom he played the next four seasons, where he won two championships, two top goaltender awards, and scored another goalie goal.

Groeneveld spent 2003–5 with Amsterdam Bulldogs again winning two championships while suffering an ACL injury. For 2005-06, he played for SV Renon in Serie A in Italy, assisting the club to the league final for the first time in 32 years. Groeneveld spent 2006-07 playing 5 games for Riviere-du-Loup CIMT of the CQSHL, and 33 games for HC Alleghe in Serie A. For 2007-08, he played for Hockey Club Bolzano Foxes in Serie A Italy, where he won another championship. In 2008-09, he played for HC Alleghe.

Groeneveld was a member of the Netherlands National Team from 2004 to 2010, winning two top goaltender awards in World Championships and a bronze medal. Amazingly, Groeneveld scored a third goalie goal in an exhibition game between France and the Netherlands.

== International ==
Groeneveld plays internationally for the Netherlands national ice hockey team. In 2005, he played for the Netherlands national team for the first time, in Olympic qualifying and the 2005 World Championships (Division 1), winning a bronze medal. In 2005 and 2007, Groeneveld won the best goaltender award of the World Championships.

== Sources ==
- Biographical information and career statistics from Eliteprospects.com, or Eurohockey.com, or The Internet Hockey Database
