= David Clarke (ice hockey) =

- Born: 5 August 1981 (age 44) Peterborough, England
- Height: 5 ft 9 in (175 cm)
- Weight: 200 lb (91 kg; 14 st 4 lb)
- Position: Left wing
- Shot: Left
- Played for: Guildford Flames; Nottingham Panthers
- National team: Great Britain
- Playing career: 1998–2018

David Clarke (born 5 August 1981) is a retired British ice hockey player and a former member of the British national ice hockey team squad.

Clarke was born in Peterborough, England, and began playing ice hockey in the local junior development system. He made his senior debut at 15 for the Peterborough Pirates in the British National League. He made 13 appearances for the club throughout the season, scoring one goal.

Clarke spent each of the next five seasons playing for the Pirates, totalling 96 points from 135 appearances. He made his debut for the national team in the 1999 World Junior Championships before being promoted into the full seniors a year later. There was a rumour that Clarke would become only the second ever British trained player drafted into the NHL but was passed over in the draft for his lack of size.

In 2000, Clarke signed for Superleague side Newcastle Jesters. British players were a rarity in the league at the time and Clarke earned seven points from forty-one appearances. In 2001, financial problems at Newcastle saw Clarke move to the London Knights, where he scored three points from ten appearances.

In 2002, Clarke moved back to the British National League by joining the Guildford Flames, scoring forty-nine points in forty-one appearances.

When the Superleague folded during the summer of 2003, the remaining clubs formed the Elite Ice Hockey League. Clarke was signed by the Nottingham Panthers where he became a fan favourite taking thirty points from forty four games in his first season and sixty-one from sixty in his second. In 2005–06, Clarke re-signed for the third season in Nottingham, totalling 26 points from forty-four appearances.

In the 2006–07 season Clarke re-signed again under new Coach Mike Ellis and Assistant Coach Calle Carllson, Clarke was also named captain following a player vote.

For the 2007–08 season, Clarke played for Alleghe in Italy before re-signing for the Nottingham Panthers for the 2008–09 season.

Clarke was re-signed by Nottingham for the 2009/10 season where he helped the Panthers win the Challenge cup and qualify for the final four of the Elite league playoffs. The Panthers finished third in the league standings for 2009/10.

After the 2010 playoffs, Clarke left with the Team GB squad for the Division 1 World championships in Slovenia where they would end up finishing in fourth position. The GB team fell foul of the volcanic ash cloud that cancelled flights throughout Europe at this time and had to endure a 27-hour bus journey from England to Slovenia.

On 21 April 2010, the Nottingham Panthers issued a press release stating that Clarke had signed again for the Nottingham club for the forthcoming 2010/2011 season.

Clarke wears the number 5 as his preference.

David Clarke officially retired after the 2017/18 EIHL season.
