= 2016 IIHF World Championship Division I =

Tournament details
- Host countries: Poland; Croatia
- Venues: 2 (in 2 host cities)
- Dates: 23–29 April; 17–23 April
- Teams: 12

The 2016 IIHF World Championship Division I was an international ice hockey tournament run by the International Ice Hockey Federation. Group A was contested in Katowice, Poland, on 23–29 April 2016 and Group B in Zagreb, Croatia, on 17–23 April 2016.

== Venues ==
Group A	Group B
Katowice	Zagreb
Spodek; Capacity: 11,500	Dom Sportova; Capacity: 6,500

== Group A tournament ==
2016 IIHF World Championship Division I A

Tournament details
- Host country: Poland
- Venue: 1 (in 1 host city)
- Dates: 23–29 April
- Teams: 6

Tournament statistics
- Games played: 15
- Goals scored: 75 (5 per game)
- Attendance: 55,300 (3,687 per game)
- Scoring leader(s): (Slovenia) Ken Ograjenšek (Slovenia) Jan Urbas (6 points)

Official website
- IIHF.com

=== Participants ===
Team	Qualification
Austria	Placed 15th in the Elite Division and were relegated.
Slovenia	Placed 16th in the Elite Division and were relegated.
Poland	Host, placed 3rd in Division I A last year.
Japan	Placed 4th in Division I A last year.
Italy	Placed 5th in Division I A last year.
South Korea	Placed 1st in Division I B last year and were promoted.

=== Match officials ===
7 referees and 7 linesmen were selected for the tournament.

Referees

- (Canada) Jonathan Alarie
- (Finland) Mikko Kaukokari
- (Russia) Artur Kulev
- (Croatia) Trpimir Piragić
- (United States) Stephen Reneau
- (Germany) Marian Rohatsch
- (Czech Republic) Robin Šír

Linesmen

- (Denmark) Henrik Haurum
- (Poland) Artur Hyliński
- (Slovakia) Martin Korba
- (Latvia) Kriss Kupcus
- (Netherlands) Joep Leermakers
- (Russia) Yakov Paley
- (Estonia) Anton Semjonov

=== Standings ===
Pos	Team	Pld	W	OTW	OTL	L	GF	GA	GD	Pts	Qualification or relegation
1	Slovenia	5	4	0	0	1	18	8	+10	12	Promoted to the 2017 Top division
2	Italy	5	3	0	0	2	11	10	+1	9 (Note: Italy 3–1 Poland)	Promoted to the 2017 Top division
3	Poland (H)	5	3	0	0	2	17	12	+5	9	
4	Austria	5	2	1	0	2	11	8	+3	8	
5	South Korea	5	2	0	1	2	11	11	0	7	
6	Japan	5	0	0	0	5	7	26	−19	0	Relegation to Division I B

Source: IIHF
Rules for classification: 1) points; 2) head-to-head points; 3) head-to-head goal difference; 4) head-to-head number of goals scored; 5) result against closest best-ranked team outside tied teams; 6) result against second-best ranked team outside tied teams; 7) seeding before tournament.
(H) Host

=== Results ===
All times are local (UTC+2).

23 April 2016; 13:00	Japan	1–7 (0–1, 0–4, 1–2)	Slovenia	Spodek, Katowice; Attendance: 1,300

Game reference

Yutaka Fukufuji
Takuto Onoda
Goalies
Robert Kristan
Referees:
(Finland) Mikko Kaukokari
(Germany) Marian Rohatsch
Linesmen:
(Denmark) Henrik Haurum
(Estonia) Anton Semjonov

	0–1	07:35 – Urbas (Pance, Kovačevič)
	0–2	21:40 – Urbas (Repe, Verlič) (PP)
	0–3	29:31 – Verlič (Urbas, Kristan) (PP)
	0–4	33:19 – Mušič (Ograjenšek, Kuralt)
	0–5	39:17 – Verlič (Urbas, Pance)
Kuji (Taka. Yamashita) – 54:46	1–5
	1–6	57:18 – Ograjenšek (Mušič)
	1–7	58:12 – Pance (Urbas, Verlič)

14 min
Penalties
8 min
9
Shots
29

23 April 2016; 16:30	Italy	3–1 (1–0, 1–1, 1–0)	Poland	Spodek, Katowice; Attendance: 8,500

Game reference

Andreas Bernard
Goalies
Przemysław Odrobny
Referees:
(Canada) Jonathan Alarie
(Russia) Artur Kulev
Linesmen:
(Latvia) Kriss Kupcus
(Netherlands) Joep Leermakers

Ramoser (Gander) – 12:25	1–0
	1–1	30:13 – Malasiński (Dronia, Zapała)
Frigo (D. Kostner, S. Kostner) – 36:19	2–1
Larkin (ENG) – 59:58	3–1

6 min
Penalties
12 min
33
Shots
26

23 April 2016; 20:00	South Korea	2–3 GWS (1–0, 1–0, 0–2) (OT 0–0) (SO: 0–1)	Austria	Spodek, Katowice; Attendance: 2,000

Game reference

Matt Dalton
Goalies
Bernhard Starkbaum
Referees:
(United States) Stephen Reneau
(Czech Republic) Robin Šír
Linesmen:
(Poland) Artur Hyliński
(Russia) Yakov Paley

Swift – 16:05	1–0
Kim K. (Kim S., Young) – 35:50	2–0
	2–1	44:50 – Schlacher (Lebler) (PP2)
	2–2	56:05 – M. Geier

Swift (miss)
Shin S. (miss)
Kim S. (miss)
Shootout
Komarek
(miss) M. Geier
10 min
Penalties
2 min
28
Shots
39

24 April 2016; 13:00	Slovenia	3–1 (1–0, 0–1, 2–0)	Italy	Spodek, Katowice; Attendance: 2,000

Game reference

Gašper Krošelj
Goalies
Frederic Cloutier
Referees:
(Croatia) Trpimir Piragić
(Czech Republic) Robin Šír
Linesmen:
(Poland) Artur Hyliński
(Slovakia) Martin Korba

Repe (Urbas) (PP) – 13:15	1–0
	1–1	26:47 – Scandella (Frigo, Helfer)
Jeglič (Kovačevič, Tičar) (PP) – 45:23	2–1
Kovačevič (Tičar, Ograjenšek) (PP, ENG) – 59:33	3–1

4 min
Penalties
10 min
40
Shots
24

24 April 2016; 16:30	Poland	1–4 (0–0, 0–2, 1–2)	South Korea	Spodek, Katowice; Attendance: 6,500

Game reference

Przemysław Odrobny
Goalies
Matt Dalton
Referees:
(Finland) Mikko Kaukokari
(Germany) Marian Rohatsch
Linesmen:
(Denmark) Henrik Haurum
(Estonia) Anton Semjonov

	0–1	21:24 – Swift (Shin S., Cho)
	0–2	24:04 – Swift (Shin S.)
Pasiut – 48:51	1–2
	1–3	50:13 – Swift (Lee D., Cho)
	1–4	58:45 – Kim S. (Kim K.) (ENG)

6 min
Penalties
4 min
33
Shots
31

24 April 2016; 20:00	Austria	3–1 (1–1, 0–0, 2–0)	Japan	Spodek, Katowice; Attendance: 1,000

Game reference

Bernhard Starkbaum
Goalies
Takuto Onoda
Referees:
(Russia) Artur Kulev
(United States) Stephen Reneau
Linesmen:
(Latvia) Kriss Kupcus
(Netherlands) Joep Leermakers

N. Petrik (S. Geier, Schiechl) – 02:49	1–0
	1–1	17:50 – Takahashi (Taka. Yamashita, Nishiwaki) (PP)
Lebler (M. Geier, Herburger) – 43:31	2–1
Herburger (Lebler, M. Geier) – 50:05	3–1

6 min
Penalties
2 min
37
Shots
27

26 April 2016; 13:00	South Korea	3–0 (3–0, 0–0, 0–0)	Japan	Spodek, Katowice; Attendance: 1,500

Game reference

Matt Dalton
Goalies
Shun Hitomi
Takuto Onoda
Referees:
(Canada) Jonathan Alarie
(Finland) Mikko Kaukokari
Linesmen:
(Slovakia) Martin Korba
(Latvia) Kriss Kupcus

Swift (Lee D.) (PP) – 04:18	1–0
Kim K. (Kim S., Kim W.) – 05:32	2–0
Shin S. (Cho, Shin H.) (PP) – 11:10	3–0

43 min
Penalties
10 min
32
Shots
29

26 April 2016; 16:30	Austria	4–2 (1–0, 2–0, 1–2)	Italy	Spodek, Katowice; Attendance: 1,500

Game reference

Bernhard Starkbaum
Goalies
Andreas Bernard
Referees:
(Russia) Artur Kulev
(Croatia) Trpimir Piragić
Linesmen:
(Denmark) Henrik Haurum
(Netherlands) Joep Leermakers

Kristler (Hofer, Ulmer) – 12:21	1–0
Kristler (Hofer) – 30:46	2–0
Komarek (Ulmer, Pallestrang) (PP) – 39:10	3–0
Bacher (Haudum, Schiechl) – 46:16	4–0
	4–1	53:09 – Egger (Traversa, D. Kostner) (PP)
	4–2	57:24 – Helfer (Hofer, Gander)

10 min
Penalties
6 min
26
Shots
22

26 April 2016; 20:00	Slovenia	1–4 (1–1, 0–3, 0–0)	Poland	Spodek, Katowice; Attendance: 6,500

Game reference

Robert Kristan
Gašper Krošelj
Goalies
Rafał Radziszewski
Referees:
(United States) Stephen Reneau
(Germany) Marian Rohatsch
Linesmen:
(Russia) Yakov Paley
(Estonia) Anton Semjonov

	0–1	03:54 – Malasiński (Dronia)
Jeglič (Sabolič) (PP) – 06:50	1–1
	1–2	23:48 – Łopuski (Wronka, Kolusz) (PP)
	1–3	27:39 – Malasiński (Wronka, Bryk)
	1–4	38:09 – Malasiński (Pociecha, Zapała)

8 min
Penalties
16 min
33
Shots
26

27 April 2016; 13:00	Japan	1–3 (1–1, 0–2, 0–0)	Italy	Spodek, Katowice; Attendance: 1,500

Game reference

Takuto Onoda
Goalies
Frederic Cloutier
Referees:
(United States) Stephen Reneau
(Germany) Marian Rohatsch
Linesmen:
(Denmark) Henrik Haurum
(Poland) Artur Hyliński

Kuji (Obara, Takahashi) – 08:48	1–0
	1–1	13:20 – S. Kostner (Frigo, Hofer)
	1–2	27:29 – Bernard (Gander)
	1–3	37:16 – Ramoser (Scandella, Marchetti)

4 min
Penalties
6 min
25
Shots
39

27 April 2016; 16:30	Slovenia	5–1 (2–1, 2–0, 1–0)	South Korea	Spodek, Katowice; Attendance: 2,500

Game reference

Gašper Krošelj
Goalies
Matt Dalton
Referees:
(Russia) Artur Kulev
(Czech Republic) Robin Šir
Linesmen:
(Netherlands) Joep Leermakers
(Russia) Yakov Paley

	0–1	00:40 – Kim K. (Kim S.)
Sabolič (Kovačević) (PP) – 08:59	1–1
Kuralt (Ograjenšek, Pretnar) – 19:31	2–1
Mušič (Kuralt, Ograjenšek) – 26:32	3–1
Tičar (Jeglič) – 34:21	4–1
Pretnar (Hebar, Kuralt) – 51:31	5–1

12 min
Penalties
14 min
26
Shots
26

27 April 2016; 20:00	Poland	1–0 (1–0, 0–0, 0–0)	Austria	Spodek, Katowice; Attendance: 7,500

Game reference
Przemysław Odrobny	Goalies	Bernhard Starkbaum	Referees: (Canada) Jonathan Alarie (Croatia) Trpimir Piragić; Linesmen: (Slovakia) Martin Korba (Latvia) Kriss Kupcusk
Pasiut (Chmielewski) – 12:34 / 1–0			Referees: (Canada) Jonathan Alarie (Croatia) Trpimir Piragić; Linesmen: (Slovakia) Martin Korba (Latvia) Kriss Kupcusk
20 min	Penalties	18 min	Referees: (Canada) Jonathan Alarie (Croatia) Trpimir Piragić; Linesmen: (Slovakia) Martin Korba (Latvia) Kriss Kupcusk
27	Shots	29	Referees: (Canada) Jonathan Alarie (Croatia) Trpimir Piragić; Linesmen: (Slovakia) Martin Korba (Latvia) Kriss Kupcusk

29 April 2016; 13:00	Italy	2–1 (1–0, 0–0, 1–1)	South Korea	Spodek, Katowice; Attendance: 2,500

Game reference

Andreas Bernard
Goalies
Matt Dalton
Referees:
(Croatia) Trpimir Piragić
(United States) Stephen Reneau
Linesmen:
(Poland) Artur Hyliński
(Slovakia) Martin Korba

Ramoser (Larkin, Scandella) (PP) – 02:38	1–0
Tudin – 54:35	2–0
	2–1	56:13 – Regan (Kim W., Kim K.) (EA)

8 min
Penalties
10 min
29
Shots
27

29 April 2016; 16:30	Austria	1–2 (1–1, 0–1, 0–0)	Slovenia	Spodek, Katowice; Attendance: 4,000

Game reference

Bernhard Starkbaum
Goalies
Gašper Krošelj
Referees:
(Finland) Mikko Kaukokari
(Germany) Marian Rohatsch
Linesmen:
(Denmark) Henrik Haurum
(Netherlands) Joep Leermakers

Komarek (Schlacher) (PP) – 05:49	1–0
	1–1	10:58 – Sabolić (Jeglič, Tičar)
	1–2	27:29 – Ograjenšek (Mušić, Pretnar) (PP)

33 min
Penalties
8 min
27
Shots
23

29 April 2016; 20:00	Poland	10–4 (6–1, 1–1, 3–2)	Japan	Spodek, Katowice; Attendance: 8,500

Game reference

Przemysław Odrobny
Goalies
Takuto Onoda
Shun Hitomi
Referees:
(Canada) Jonathan Alarie
(Czech Republic) Robin Šír
Linesmen:
(Russia) Yakov Paley
(Estonia) Anton Semjonov

Wronka (Bychawski, Zapała) – 00:50	1–0
Chmielewski (Pasiut, Łopuski) (PP) – 03:58	2–0
Malasiński (Zapała, Kruczek) (SH) – 06:42	3–0
Kruczek (Dziubiński) – 10:35	4–0
Pasiut (SH) – 12:27	5–0
Dziubiński (Kolusz) – 17:52	6–0
	6–1	19:56 – Ueno (Takahashi, Taka. Yamashita)
Bagiński (Kotlorz, Bychawski) – 23:15	7–1
	7–2	25:47 – Kawai (Haga, Yanadori) (PP)
	7–3	41:39 – Obara (Terao)
Chmielewski (Dronia, Kruczek) (PP) – 44:00	8–3
	8–4	44:46 – Nishiwaki (Takahashi, Tanaka) (PP)
Dronia (Zapała) – 55:34	9–4
Wajda (Borzęcki, Wronka) (PP) – 59:48	10–4

10 min
Penalties
12 min
51
Shots
22

=== Awards and statistics ===
==== Awards ====
- Best players selected by the directorate:
  - Best Goalkeeper: (Austria) Bernhard Starkbaum
  - Best Defenseman: (Italy) Thomas Larkin
  - Best Forward: (Poland) Patryk Wronka

Source: IIHF.com

- Media All-Stars:
  - MVP: (Slovenia) Jan Urbas
  - Goalkeeper: (Slovenia) Gašper Krošelj
  - Defenceman: (Slovenia) Sabahudin Kovačević / (Poland) Paweł Dronia
  - Forwards: (South Korea) Michael Swift / (Slovenia) Jan Urbas / (Poland) Patryk Wronka

Source: IIHF.com

==== Scoring leaders ====
List shows the top skaters sorted by points, then goals.

Player	GP	G	A	Pts	+/−	PIM
(Slovenia) Ken Ograjenšek	5	2	4	6	+2	2
(Slovenia) Jan Urbas	5	2	4	6	+3	0
(Poland) Tomasz Malasiński	5	5	0	5	+5	4
(South Korea) Michael Swift	5	5	0	5	+3	12
(South Korea) Kim Ki-sung	5	3	2	5	+1	0
(Poland) Krzysztof Zapała	5	0	5	5	+2	4
(Poland) Grzegorz Pasiut	5	3	1	4	0	0
(Slovenia) Žiga Jeglič	5	2	2	4	+1	2
(Slovenia) Aleš Mušič	5	2	2	4	+3	2
(Slovenia) Miha Verlič	5	2	2	4	+3	6

GP = Games played; G = Goals; A = Assists; Pts = Points; +/− = Plus/minus; PIM = Penalties in minutes
Source: IIHF.com

==== Goaltending leaders ====
Only the top five goaltenders, based on save percentage, who have played at least 40% of their team's minutes, are included in this list.

Player	TOI	GA	GAA	SA	Sv%	SO
(Slovenia) Gašper Krošelj	200:00	3	0.90	82	96.34	0
(Austria) Bernhard Starkbaum	302:45	8	1.59	126	93.65	0
(South Korea) Matt Dalton	302:47	11	2.18	156	92.95	1
(Italy) Andreas Bernard	180:00	6	2.00	79	92.41	0
(Poland) Przemysław Odrobny	238:22	9	2.27	113	92.04	1

TOI = Time on ice (minutes:seconds); SA = Shots against; GA = Goals against; GAA = Goals against average; Sv% = Save percentage; SO = Shutouts
Source: IIHF.com

== Group B tournament ==
2016 IIHF World Championship Division I B

Tournament details
- Host country: Croatia
- Venue: 1 (in 1 host city)
- Dates: 17–23 April
- Teams: 6

Tournament statistics
- Games played: 15
- Goals scored: 99 (6.6 per game)
- Attendance: 13,920 (928 per game)
- Scoring leader: (Estonia) Robert Rooba (8 points)

Official website
- IIHF.com

=== Participants ===
Team	Qualification
Ukraine	Placed 6th in Division I A last year and were relegated.
Great Britain	Placed 2nd in Division I B last year.
Lithuania	Placed 3rd in Division I B last year.
Croatia	Host, placed 4th in Division I B last year.
Estonia	Placed 5th in Division I B last year.
Romania	Placed 1st in Division II A last year and were promoted.

=== Match officials ===
4 referees and 7 linesmen were selected for the tournament.

Referees

- (France) Jimmy Bergamelli
- (Italy) Daniel Gamper
- (Sweden) Mikael Holm
- (Austria) Manuel Nikolic

Linesmen

- (Croatia) Vanja Belić
- (Switzerland) Franco Espinoza
- (Croatia) Tomislav Grozaj
- (Finland) Markus Hägerström
- (Japan) Shunsuke Ichikawa
- (South Korea) Park Jun-soo
- (Slovenia) Damir Rakovič

=== Standings ===
Pos	Team	Pld	W	OTW	OTL	L	GF	GA	GD	Pts	Qualification or relegation
1	Ukraine	5	4	0	0	1	20	6	+14	12	Promoted to Division I A
2	Great Britain	5	3	1	0	1	23	7	+16	11	
3	Lithuania	5	3	0	1	1	15	14	+1	10	
4	Croatia (H)	5	2	1	0	2	21	17	+4	8	
5	Estonia	5	1	0	1	3	12	23	−11	4	
6	Romania	5	0	0	0	5	8	32	−24	0	Relegation to Division II A

Source: IIHF
Rules for classification: 1) points; 2) head-to-head points; 3) head-to-head goal difference; 4) head-to-head number of goals scored; 5) result against closest best-ranked team outside tied teams; 6) result against second-best ranked team outside tied teams; 7) seeding before tournament.
(H) Host

=== Results ===
All times are local (UTC+2).

17 April 2016; 13:00	Estonia	2–7 (1–2, 1–4, 0–1)	Lithuania	Dom Sportova, Zagreb; Attendance: 95

Game reference

Villem-Henrik Koitmaa
Daniil Seppenen
Goalies
Artur Pavliukov
Referee:
(France) Jimmy Bergamelli
Linesmen:
(Croatia) Vanja Belić
(Slovenia) Damir Rakovič

Rooba (Petrov, Makrov) – 10:49	1–0
	1–1	14:24 – Baltrukonis (Bendžius, Gintautas)
	1–2	16:43 – Čižas (Ališauskas)
	1–3	23:24 – Bogdziul (Bosas) (SH)
Rooba (PS) – 26:38	2–3
	2–4	28:06 – Ališauskas (Verenis) (PP)
	2–5	32:15 – Gintautas (Baltrukonis)
	2–6	37:39 – Ališauskas (Kumeliauskas) (PP)
	2–7	49:31 – Gintautas (Baltrukonis) (SH)

6 min
Penalties
14 min
30
Shots
30

17 April 2016; 16:30	Romania	1–6 (1–2, 0–1, 0–3)	Ukraine	Dom Sportova, Zagreb; Attendance: 200

Game reference

Gellért Ruczuj
Goalies
Eduard Zakharchenko
Referee:
(Austria) Manuel Nikolic
Linesmen:
(Croatia) Tomislav Grozaj
(Japan) Shunsuke Ichikawa

	0–1	05:10 – Petrangovsky (Gnidenko)
	0–2	11:28 – Gavryk (Chernyshenko)
Péter (Papp, Mihály) (PP) – 16:18	1–2
	1–3	27:54 – Gavryk (Tymchenko)
	1–4	42:24 – Pobyedonostsev (Mikhnov, Shafarenko)
	1–5	44:03 – Zakharov (Babynets)
	1–6	48:07 – Gnidenko (Bondaryev) (SH)

8 min
Penalties
12 min
12
Shots
48

17 April 2016; 20:00	Croatia	1–4 (1–1, 0–2, 0–1)	Great Britain	Dom Sportova, Zagreb; Attendance: 2,600

Game reference

Mate Tomljenović
Goalies
Ben Bowns
Referee:
(Sweden) Mikael Holm
Linesmen:
(Switzerland) Franco Espinoza
(Finland) Markus Hägerström

	0–1	11:27 – Dowd (O'Connor, Farmer)
Blagus (Jarčov, Jačmenjak) (PP2) – 14:05	1–1
	1–2	24:12 – Weaver (Shields, Dowd)
	1–3	35:43 – Peacock (Tait, Richardson)
	1–4	48:29 – Shields (O'Connor, Dowd)

22 min
Penalties
26 min
14
Shots
29

18 April 2016; 13:00	Lithuania	5–1 (2–1, 1–0, 2–0)	Romania	Dom Sportova, Zagreb; Attendance: 100

Game reference

Artur Pavliukov
Goalies
Ottó Onodi
Referee:
(Italy) Daniel Gamper
Linesmen:
(Croatia) Tomislav Grozaj
(Finland) Markus Hägerström

Verenis (Čižas, Jasinevičius) – 05:30	1–0
Kieras (Ališauskas, Kumeliauskas) (PP) – 10:33	2–0
	2–1	14:17 – Lőrincz (Fodor)
Alisaukas (Kieras, Bosas) (PP) – 29:28	3–1
Bosas (Bogdziul, Kumeliauskas) – 40:20	4–1
Katulis (Čižas, Fiščevas) (PP) – 58:04	5–1

10 min
Penalties
14 min
37
Shots
19

18 April 2016; 16:30	Great Britain	4–3 OT (2–1, 1–1, 0–1) (OT 1–0)	Estonia	Dom Sportova, Zagreb; Attendance: 455

Game reference

Ben Bowns
Goalies
Villem-Henrik Koitmaa
Referee:
(Sweden) Mikael Holm
Linesmen:
(Croatia) Vanja Belić
(Switzerland) Franco Espinoza

Peacock (Cowley) – 00:26	1–0
Cowley (Dowd, O'Connor) – 12:43	2–0
	2–1	13:10 – Petrov (Lahesalu, Rooba)
Cowley (Tait) – 20:55	3–1
	3–2	33:11 – Petrov (Lahesalu)
	3–3	53:05 – Makrov (Petrov, Rooba) (PP)
Dowd (Weaver) (PP) – 63:22	4–3

22 min
Penalties
4 min
37
Shots
28

18 April 2016; 20:00	Ukraine	4–1 (2–1, 2–0, 0–0)	Croatia	Dom Sportova, Zagreb; Attendance: 1,500

Game reference

Eduard Zakharchenko
Goalies
Mate Tomljenović
Referee:
(France) Jimmy Bergamelli
Linesmen:
(South Korea) Park Jun-soo
(Slovenia) Damir Rakovič

Chernyshenko – 02:28	1–0
Isayenko (Petrangovsky) – 14:39	2–0
	2–1	18:06 – Mikulić (Jarčov)
Zakharov (Babynets) – 20:13	3–1
Shafarenko (Mikhnov, Aleksyuk) (PP2) – 26:10	4–1

14 min
Penalties
50 min
28
Shots
33

20 April 2016; 13:00	Ukraine	7–1 (2–0, 2–1, 3–0)	Estonia	Dom Sportova, Zagreb; Attendance: 120

Game reference

Eduard Zakharchenko
Mykhailo Shevchuk
Goalies
Daniil Seppenen
Referee:
(Austria) Manuel Nikolic
Linesmen:
(Croatia) Vanja Belić
(Switzerland) Franco Espinoza

Gavryk (Tymchenko, Aleksyuk) – 05:03	1–0
Blagy (Petrukhno) – 14:12	2–0
	2–1	22:57– Rooba (PS)
Mikhnov (Andreikiv, Shafarenko) – 36:25	3–1
Tymchenko (Gavryk) – 36:56	4–1
Petrangovsky (Romanenko) – 44:34	5–1
Mikhnov (Shafarenko) (PP) – 50:38	6–1
Bondaryev (Babynets) – 55:08	7–1

6 min
Penalties
4 min
35
Shots
29

20 April 2016; 16:30	Great Britain	8–0 (2–0, 6–0, 0–0)	Lithuania	Dom Sportova, Zagreb; Attendance: 450

Game reference

Ben Bowns
Goalies
Artur Pavliukov
Donatas Žukovas
Referee:
(France) Jimmy Bergamelli
Linesmen:
(South Korea) Park Jun-soo
(Slovenia) Damir Rakovič

Phillips (SH) – 08:34	1–0
Tait (Cowley, Phillips) – 17:29	2–0
Venus (Cowley) – 20:13	3–0
Lachowicz (Phillips) – 24:52	4–0
O'Connor (Peacock, Weaver) (PP) – 30:42	5–0
Boxill (Lachowicz, Phillips) – 31:05	6–0
Cowley (Venus, O'Connor) – 36:15	7–0
Shields (O'Connor, Mosey) (PP) – 39:00	8–0

10 min
Penalties
16 min
44
Shots
10

20 April 2016; 20:00	Romania	5–12 (1–3, 2–4, 2–5)	Croatia	Dom Sportova, Zagreb; Attendance: 1,650

Game reference

Gellért Ruczuj
Ottó Onodi
Goalies
Mate Tomljenović
Vilim Rosandič
Referee:
(Italy) Daniel Gamper
Linesmen:
(Finland) Markus Hägerström
(Japan) Shunsuke Ichikawa

	0–1	01:06 – Jačmenjak (Blagus, Rendulić)
	0–2	07:11 – Miličić (Tadić, Brine)
Lőrincz (Molnár, Zsók) – 16:11	1–2
	1–3	16:18 – Janković (Jarčov, Puzić)
Péter (SH) – 23:50	2–3
	2–4	25:34 – Rendulić (Jačmenjak) (PP)
	2–5	27:04 – Jarčov (Janković)
	2–6	30:49 – Brine (Glumac) (PP)
Fodor (Timaru, Csergő) – 32:27	3–6
	3–7	36:25 – Janković (Mikulić)
	3–8	40:11 – Glumac
Csergő (Zsók, Nagy) – 48:50	4–8
Fodor (Csergő, Timaru) – 49:39	5–8
	5–9	50:23 – Miličić (Glumac, Brine)
	5–10	50:43 – Šakić (Mirić)
	5–11	53:05 – Blagus (Rendulić)
	5–12	53:40 – MacAulay (Rendulić, Perkovich)

12 min
Penalties
35 min
30
Shots
36

22 April 2016; 13:00	Great Britain	6–1 (2–0, 2–0, 2–1)	Romania	Dom Sportova, Zagreb; Attendance: 400

Game reference

Ben Bowns
Goalies
Ottó Onodi
Referee:
(Italy) Daniel Gamper
Linesmen:
(Switzerland) Franco Espinoza
(Japan) Shunsuke Ichikawa

Phillips (Lachowicz, Boxill) – 03:15	1–0
Boxill (Phillips) – 10:52	2–0
Farmer (Myers, Dowd) (PP) – 23:00	3–0
Shields (O'Connor, Weaver) (PP) – 33:19	4–0
Myers (Clarke) – 48:51	5–0
Weaver (Clarke, O'Connor) (PP) – 54:13	6–0
	6–1	55:17 – Moldován (Mihály, Salló)

6 min
Penalties
14 min
58
Shots
11

22 April 2016; 16:30	Lithuania	2–1 (0–0, 0–1, 2–0)	Ukraine	Dom Sportova, Zagreb; Attendance: 350

Game reference

Artur Pavliukov
Goalies
Eduard Zakharchenko
Referee:
(Sweden) Mikael Holm
Linesmen:
(Croatia) Vanja Belić
(Croatia) Tomislav Grozaj

	0–1	36:07 – Petrangovsky (Kicha)
Čižas (Verenis, Katulis) (PP) – 42:22	1–1
Kumeliauskas (Bogdziul, Bosas) – 50:02	2–1

6 min
Penalties
6 min
27
Shots
32

22 April 2016; 20:00	Croatia	5–3 (1–2, 3–1, 1–0)	Estonia	Dom Sportova, Zagreb; Attendance: 2,800

Game reference

Vilim Rosandić
Goalies
Villem-Henrik Koitmaa
Referee:
(Austria) Manuel Nikolic
Linesmen:
(Finland) Markus Hägerström
(South Korea) Park Jun-soo

	0–1	03:23 – Makrov (Petrov, Rooba)
	0–2	05:20 – Rooba (Makrov)
Rendulić (Tadić, Janković) – 15:21	1–2
Perkovich (Jačmenjak, Rendulić) (EA) – 30:07	2–2
Perkovich (Rendulić, Puzić) – 36:49	3–2
Glumac (Puzić, Brine) (PP) – 38:23	4–2
	4–3	39:59 – Sibirtsev (SH)
Glumac (Kegalj) (ENG) – 59:10	5–3

8 min
Penalties
10 min
40
Shots
27

23 April 2016; 13:00	Ukraine	2–1 (0–0, 0–1, 2–0)	Great Britain	Dom Sportova, Zagreb; Attendance: 500

Game reference

Eduard Zakharchenko
Goalies
Ben Bowns
Referee:
(Sweden) Mikael Holm
Linesmen:
(Switzerland) Franco Espinoza
(Finland) Markus Hägerström

	0-1	21:54 – J. Phillips (Batch, Lachowicz)
Chernyshenko (Gavryk) – 44:25	1-1
Pobedonostsev (Shafarenko, Gavryk) – 56:04	2-1

6 min
Penalties
8 min
23
Shots
28

23 April 2016; 16:30	Estonia	3–0 (0–0, 3–0, 0–0)	Romania	Dom Sportova, Zagreb; Attendance: 200

Game reference

Villem-Henrik Koitmaa
Goalies
Ottó Onodi
Referee:
(France) Jimmy Bergamelli
Linesmen:
(Croatia) Tomislav Grozaj
(Japan) Shunsuke Ichikawa

Andrejev (Titarenko) – 31:51	1–0
Makrov (Petrov, Rooba) – 38:13	2–0
Vasjonkin (PS) – 39:59	3–0

4 min
Penalties
10 min
35
Shots
20

23 April 2016; 20:00	Lithuania	1–2 GWS (0–1, 0–0, 1–0) (OT 0–0) (SO: 0–1)	Croatia	Dom Sportova, Zagreb; Attendance: 2,500

Game reference
Artur Pavliukov	Goalies	Vilim Rosandič	Referee: (Austria) Manuel Nikolic; Linesmen: (South Korea) Park Jun-soo (Slovenia) Damir Rakovič
/ 0–1 / 19:11 – Glumac (Brine, MacAulay (PP); Kumeliauskas (Bogdziul, Bosas) – 54:19 / 1–1			Referee: (Austria) Manuel Nikolic; Linesmen: (South Korea) Park Jun-soo (Slovenia) Damir Rakovič
Bosas (miss); Kumeiauskas (miss); Katulis (miss)	Shootout	Rendulić (miss); Janković; Glumac (miss)	Referee: (Austria) Manuel Nikolic; Linesmen: (South Korea) Park Jun-soo (Slovenia) Damir Rakovič
38 min	Penalties	16 min	Referee: (Austria) Manuel Nikolic; Linesmen: (South Korea) Park Jun-soo (Slovenia) Damir Rakovič
24	Shots	38	Referee: (Austria) Manuel Nikolic; Linesmen: (South Korea) Park Jun-soo (Slovenia) Damir Rakovič

=== Awards and statistics ===
==== Awards ====
- Best players selected by the directorate:
  - Best Goalkeeper: (Ukraine) Eduard Zakharchenko
  - Best Defenseman: (United Kingdom) Ben O'Connor
  - Best Forward: (Croatia) Borna Rendulić

Source: IIHF.com

==== Scoring leaders ====
List shows the top skaters sorted by points, then goals.

Player	GP	G	A	Pts	+/−	PIM	POS
(Estonia) Robert Rooba	5	4	4	8	−4	0	F
(United Kingdom) Ben O'Connor	5	1	7	8	+2	12	D
(Ukraine) Vladyslav Gavryk	5	3	4	7	+7	2	F
(Croatia) Borna Rendulić	4	2	5	7	−3	0	F
(Croatia) Mike Glumac	5	4	2	6	+3	4	F
(United Kingdom) Russell Cowley	5	3	3	6	+4	2	F
(United Kingdom) Jonathan Phillips	5	3	3	6	+6	6	F
(Estonia) Aleksandr Petrov	5	2	4	6	−3	0	F
(Lithuania) Nerijus Ališauskas	5	3	2	5	+4	2	D
(Croatia) Ivan Janković	5	3	2	5	+1	4	F
(Estonia) Andrei Makrov	5	3	2	5	–3	6	F

GP = Games played; G = Goals; A = Assists; Pts = Points; +/− = Plus/minus; PIM = Penalties in minutes; POS = Position
Source: IIHF.com

==== Goaltending leaders ====
Only the top five goaltenders, based on save percentage, who have played at least 40% of their team's minutes, are included in this list.

Player	TOI	GA	GAA	SA	Sv%	SO
(Ukraine) Eduard Zakharchenko	298:25	6	1.21	129	95.35	0
(Croatia) Vilim Rosandič	135:21	4	1.77	56	92.86	0
(Lithuania) Artur Pavliukov	275:42	11	2.39	140	92.14	0
(United Kingdom) Ben Bowns	302:56	7	1.39	86	91.86	1
(Estonia) Villem-Henrik Koitmaa	222:45	14	3.77	114	87.72	1

TOI = Time on ice (minutes:seconds); SA = Shots against; GA = Goals against; GAA = Goals against average; Sv% = Save percentage; SO = Shutouts
Source: IIHF.com
