= Hotel Lilie =

Hotel in Sterzing, South Tyrol

- Industry: Hotel
- Founded: 1461
- Headquarters: Neustadt 49, Sterzing, Italy
- Website: www.hotellilie.it/en

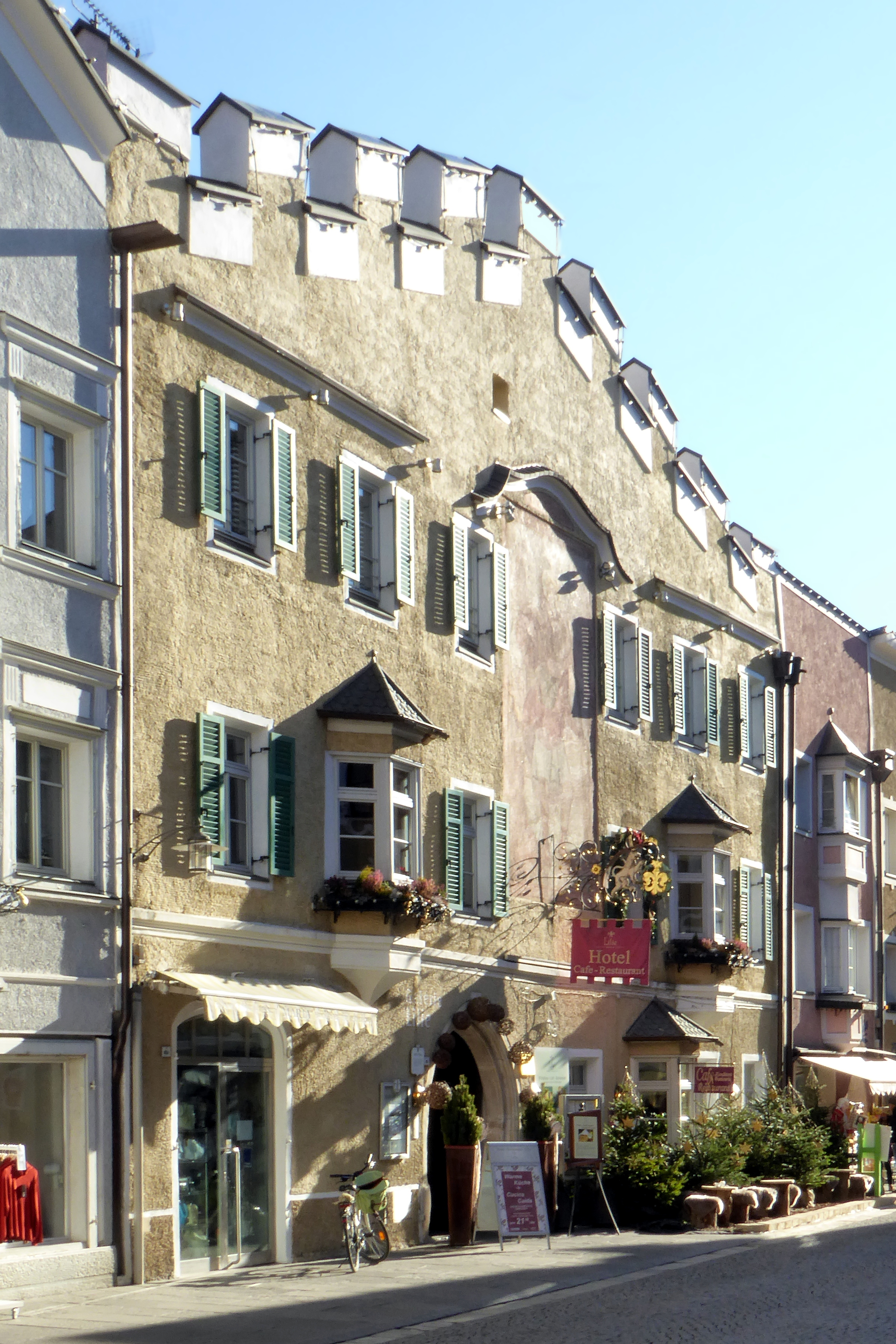

Hotel Lilie is a traditional inn located in historical center of Sterzing, South Tyrol, Italy, the first written record about it is from 1461. The hotel worked as an inn since its origin and today it is one of the most beautiful buildings of the Late Middle Ages and is protected by the state as a treasure of fine arts.

== See also ==
- List of oldest companies
