= Markus Schlacher =

Austrian ice hockey player

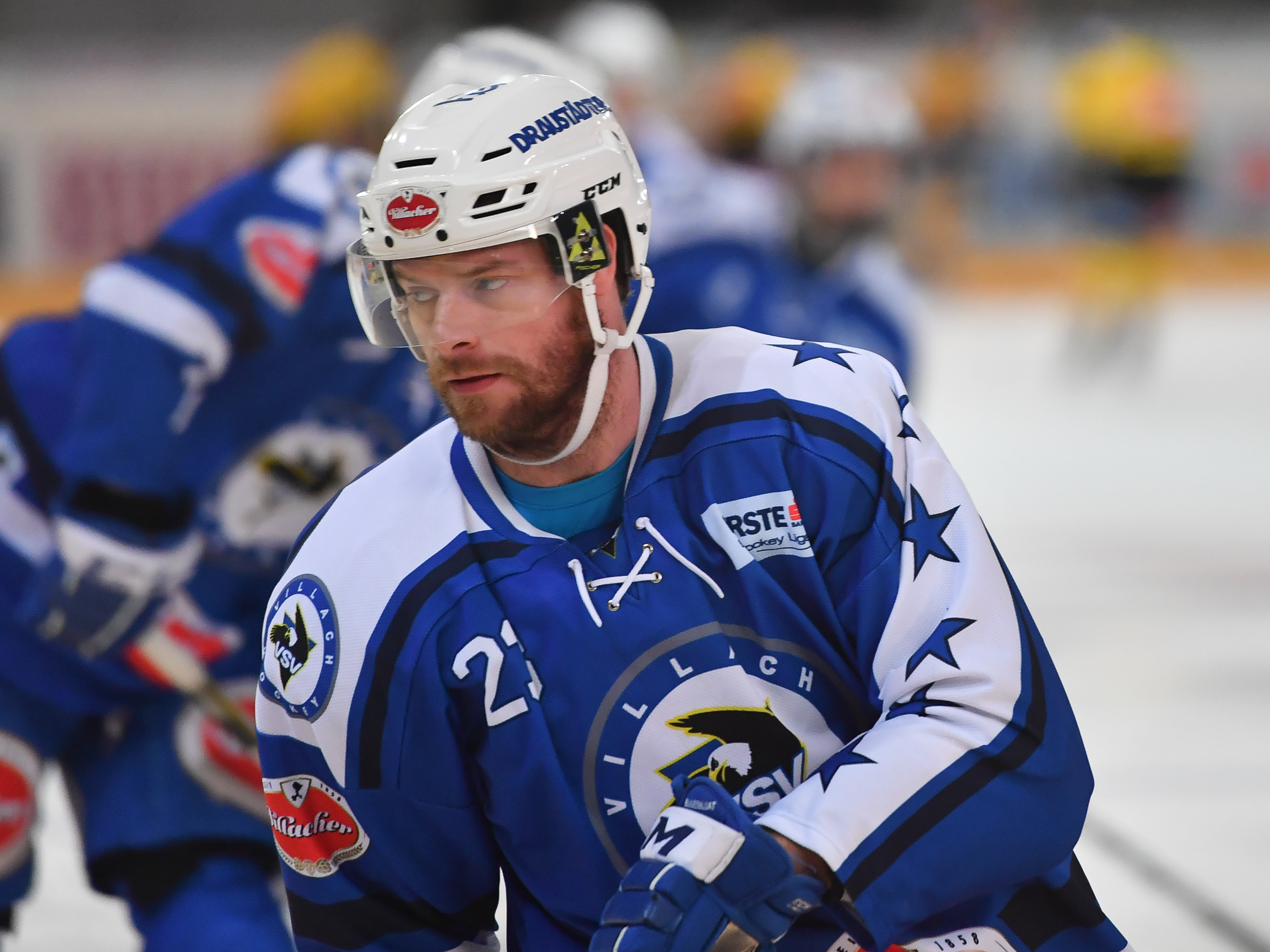
- Born: 23 August 1987 (age 38) Villach, Austria
- Height: 6 ft 1 in (185 cm)
- Weight: 192 lb (87 kg; 13 st 10 lb)
- Position: Defenceman
- Shot: Right
- Played for: EC VSV; Skellefteå AIK; EHC Black Wings Linz; EC Red Bull Salzburg; Vienna Capitals
- National team: Austria
- Playing career: 2003–2020

Markus Schlacher (born 23 August 1987) is an Austrian former professional ice hockey defenceman who played for EC VSV of the Austrian Hockey League (EBEL).

== Career statistics ==
=== Regular season and playoffs ===
			Regular season					Playoffs
Season	Team	League	GP	G	A	Pts	PIM	GP	G	A	Pts	PIM
2001–02	EC VSV U20	Austria U20	2	0	2	2	14	—	—	—	—	—
2002–03	EC VSV U20	Austria U20	14	3	1	4	0	—	—	—	—	—
2003–04	EC VSV U20	Austria U20	24	13	8	21	30	—	—	—	—	—
2003–04	EC VSV	EBEL	3	0	0	0	0	—	—	—	—	—
2004–05	EC VSV U20	Austria U20	21	15	11	26	20	—	—	—	—	—
2004–05	EC VSV	EBEL	20	0	3	3	0	3	0	0	0	2
2005–06	EC VSV U20	Austria U20	14	9	4	13	6	—	—	—	—	—
2005–06	EC VSV	EBEL	43	2	1	3	10	9	0	0	0	0
2006–07	Skellefteå AIK J20	J20 SuperElit	36	10	11	21	20	2	0	0	0	0
2006–07	Skellefteå AIK	Elitserien	9	2	0	2	0	—	—	—	—	—
2007–08	Black Wings Linz	EBEL	37	3	0	3	10	—	—	—	—	—
2008–09	Black Wings Linz	EBEL	47	6	1	7	18	10	0	0	0	12
2009–10	Black Wings Linz	EBEL	50	5	4	9	36	18	2	3	5	8
2010–11	Black Wings Linz	EBEL	52	2	5	7	41	5	1	1	2	2
2011–12	EC Red Bull Salzburg	EBEL	41	2	4	6	10	6	0	2	2	0
2012–13	Vienna Capitals	EBEL	41	6	7	13	16	15	1	2	3	4
2013–14	Vienna Capitals	EBEL	51	4	19	23	10	5	0	2	2	4
2014–15	Vienna Capitals	EBEL	23	0	2	2	2	—	—	—	—	—
2015–16	EC VSV	EBEL	54	2	20	22	46	11	0	3	3	8
2016–17	EC VSV	EBEL	53	2	11	13	24	—	—	—	—	—
2017–18	EC VSV	EBEL	50	5	14	19	38	—	—	—	—	—
2018–19	EC VSV	EBEL	50	2	11	13	32	—	—	—	—	—
2019–20	EC VSV	EBEL	47	2	10	12	30	3	0	0	0	0
EBEL totals			662	43	112	155	323	85	4	13	17	40

=== International ===
Year	Team	Event	GP	G	A	Pts	PIM
2005	Austria U18	WJC-18 (D1)	5	3	2	5	0
2006	Austria U20	WJC-20 (D1)	5	0	0	0	2
2007	Austria U20	WJC-20 (D1)	5	3	1	4	12
2014	Austria	WC (D1A)	5	0	1	1	0
2016	Austria	WC (D1A)	5	1	1	2	2
2016	Austria	OGQ	3	0	0	0	2
2017	Austria	WC (D1A)	5	0	2	2	2
2018	Austria	WC	7	0	0	0	0
2019	Austria	WC	7	0	1	1	2
Junior totals			15	6	3	9	14
Senior totals			32	1	5	6	8
