= Patryk Wronka =

Polish ice hockey player

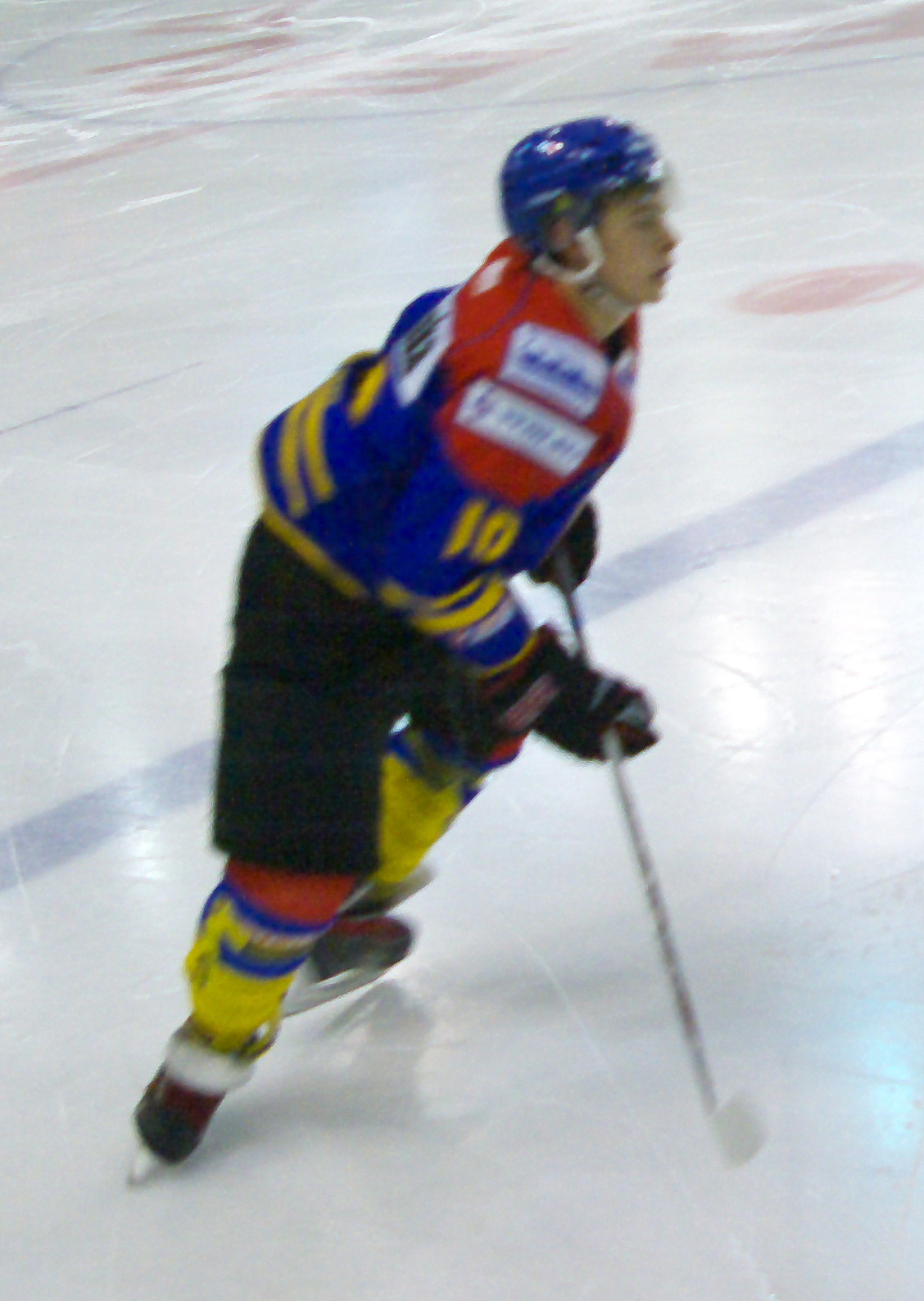
- Born: August 28, 1995 (age 31) Zakopane, Poland
- Height: 5 ft 8 in (173 cm)
- Weight: 154 lb (70 kg; 11 st 0 lb)
- Position: Left wing
- Shoots: Right
- PHL team Former teams: GKS Katowice; Orli Znojmo (EBEL); Podhale Nowy Targ (Poland); Belfast Giants (EIHL); Rapaces de Gap (Ligue Magnus); GKS Tychy (Poland); GKS Katowice (Poland)
- National team: Poland
- Playing career: 2014–present

Patryk Wronka (born August 28, 1995) is a Polish professional ice hockey forward currently playing for GKS Katowice in the Polska Hokej Liga. His grandfather, Tadeusz Kacik, also played hockey, and represented Poland at the 1972 Winter Olympics.

== Career ==
A product of MMKS Podhale Nowy Targ, Wronka made his debut in the Polska Hokej Liga, Poland's first division, during the 2013–14 season, playing in 46 contests (eight goals, 22 assists). In the following two years, he led the club to third-place finishes in the Polska Hokej Liga. After tallying 18 goals and 25 assists in 54 games of the 2015-16 campaign, he opted to continue his career abroad, penning a deal with Orli Znojmo, a club from the Czech Republic, that competes in Austria's elite-league EBEL.

In 2017, he moved back to his native Poland, signing with GKS Katowice.

After spells in the UK with EIHL side Belfast Giants and in France's Ligue Magnus with Rapaces de Gap, Wronka returned to Poland again in 2020 to sign for GKS Tychy.

In 2021, Wronka remained in Poland and re-signed with GKS Katowice. For the 2022-23 season, Wronka moved to fellow Polish club Cracovia Krakow.

== National team ==
At the 2016 IIHF World Championship Division I Group A, he received Best Forward honors and made the All-Star Team.
