= Anton Mitterwurzer =

German opera singer

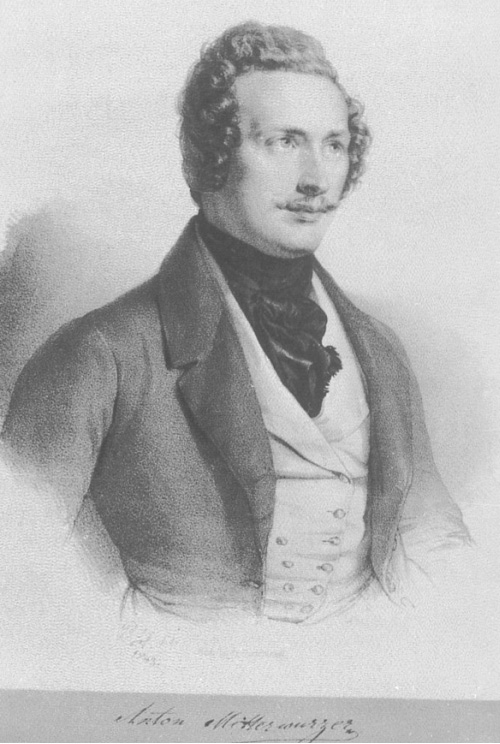
Anton Mitterwurzer

Anton Mitterwurzer(12 April 1818 in Sterzing – 2 April 1876 in Döbling) was a German opera singer, a noted baritone interpreter of the works of Gluck, Marschner, and Wagner.

== Biography ==
Mitterwurzer was born in Sterzing, Tyrol and made his first theatrical appearance at Innsbruck. He was engaged at the age of twenty-one in Dresden and stayed there for thirty years, greatly influencing operatic methods. Mitterwurzer was at his best in Wagnerian roles like Wolfram, Telramund, and Hans Sachs.
