= David Brine =

Canadian-born Croatian ice hockey player

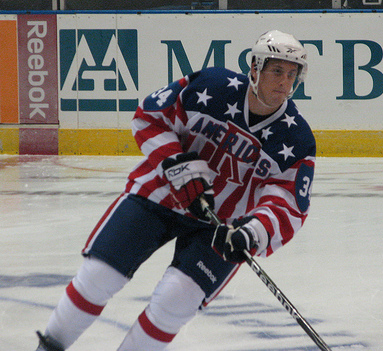
- Born: January 6, 1985 (age 40); Truro, Nova Scotia, Canada
- Height: 6 ft 1 in (185 cm)
- Weight: 201 lb (91 kg; 14 st 5 lb)
- Position: Centre
- Shoots: Left
- Played for: Florida Panthers; KHL Medveščak Zagreb; High1; Aalborg Pirates; SC Riessersee; HC Valpellice; Löwen Frankfurt; Cardiff Devils; Újpesti TE
- National team: Croatia
- NHL draft: Undrafted
- Playing career: 2006–present

David Brine (born January 6, 1985) is a Canadian-born Croatian professional ice hockey Centre who last played for Újpesti TE in the Erste Liga. Brine previously played for KHL Medveščak Zagreb of the Erste Bank Eishockey Liga.

== Playing career ==
Brine spent three years with the Halifax Mooseheads of the Quebec Major Junior Hockey League, where he scored 100 points as a 20-year-old in 2005–06. He ended the season playing nine playoff games with the Manitoba Moose of the American Hockey League.

In 2006, Brine was a contestant on the Global reality series Making the Cut: Last Man Standing. Though he did not win the series, Brine impressed Mike Keenan enough to earn a tryout with the Florida Panthers. Signed as an undrafted free agent by the Panthers, Brine spent two years with the Panthers minor league affiliates before making his NHL debut with the Panthers on February 2, 2008.

After playing two years for KHL Medvescak Zagreb of the Austrian Erste Bank Eishockey Liga and their affiliate KHL Medvescak II of the Croatian Ice Hockey League, Brine signed with High1 of the Asian League for the 2013–14 season.

== Career statistics ==
=== Regular season and playoffs ===
			Regular season					Playoffs
Season	Team	League	GP	G	A	Pts	PIM	GP	G	A	Pts	PIM
2002–03	Truro Bearcats	MJAHL	52	21	32	53	29	—	—	—	—	—
2003–04	Halifax Mooseheads	QMJHL	70	22	25	47	20	—	—	—	—	—
2004–05	Halifax Mooseheads	QMJHL	67	14	37	51	36	13	6	7	13	8
2005–06	Halifax Mooseheads	QMJHL	70	34	66	100	80	11	1	5	6	23
2005–06	Manitoba Moose	AHL	—	—	—	—	—	9	0	1	1	2
2006–07	Florida Everblades	ECHL	52	9	21	30	22	15	6	4	10	22
2006–07	Rochester Americans	AHL	22	4	4	8	4	—	—	—	—	—
2007–08	Rochester Americans	AHL	66	9	11	20	26	—	—	—	—	—
2007–08	Florida Panthers	NHL	9	0	1	1	4	—	—	—	—	—
2008–09	Rochester Americans	AHL	79	8	23	31	35	—	—	—	—	—
2009–10	Rochester Americans	AHL	69	14	18	32	14	7	0	1	1	2
2010–11	San Antonio Rampage	AHL	67	2	12	14	27	—	—	—	—	—
2011–12	KHL Medvescak Zagreb	EBEL	49	4	19	23	22	9	0	5	5	4
2011–12	KHL Medvescak II	CIHL	—	—	—	—	—	4	2	2	4	6
2012–13	KHL Medvescak Zagreb	EBEL	54	11	23	34	57	6	2	2	4	4
2012–13	KHL Medvescak II	CIHL	—	—	—	—	—	2	0	2	2	0
2013–14	High1	AL	41	16	35	51	30	3	2	0	2	2
2014–15	Aalborg Pirates	DEN	8	4	3	7	2	—	—	—	—	—
2014–15	SC Riessersee	DEL2	15	4	9	13	6	—	—	—	—	—
2014–15	HC Valpellice	ITL	4	2	1	3	2	5	2	1	3	0
2015–16	Löwen Frankfurt	DEL2	37	4	17	21	12	4	0	2	2	0
2016–17	Cardiff Devils	EIHL	50	2	10	12	2	4	0	0	0	0
2017–18	Medvescak Zagreb	EBEL	52	1	7	8	12	6	0	1	1	4
2018–19	Medvescak Zagreb	EBEL	25	1	4	5	2	—	—	—	—	—
2018–19	Újpesti TE	Erste Liga	21	5	7	12	0	10	0	3	3	0
NHL totals			9	0	1	1	4	—	—	—	—	—

=== International ===
Year	Team	Event	Result	GP	G	A	Pts	PIM
2016	Croatia	WC-D1	17th	5	1	4	5	2
2017	Croatia	WC-D1	27th	4	1	3	4	2
Senior totals				9	2	7	9	4
