= Tadeusz Kacik =

Polish ice hockey player

- Born: October 6, 1946; Nowy Targ, Poland
- Died: May 17, 1988 (aged 41); Katowice, Poland
- Height: 5 ft 7 in (170 cm)
- Weight: 170 lb (77 kg; 12 st 2 lb)
- Position: Forward
- Played for: Podhale Nowy Targ; KTH Krynica
- National team: Poland
- Playing career: c. 1966–c. 1974

Tadeusz Kacik (6 October 1946 – 17 May 1988) was a Polish ice hockey player. He played for Podhale Nowy Targ and KTH Krynicaduring his career. He also played for the Polish national team at the 1972 Winter Olympics and multiple World Championships. Kacik won the Polish league championship six times in his career, all with Podhale. In 1971 he was voted the best player in Poland. His grandson, Patryk Wronka, also plays ice hockey and has represented Poland internationally.
