= Astrid Plank =

Italian former alpine skier (born 1971)

Personal information
- Born: 30 June 1971 (age 55) Sterzing, Italy
- Height: 1.68

Skiing career
- Sport: Alpine skiing
- Retired: 1998
- Disciplines: Slalom

Olympics
- Teams: 1

World Championships
- Teams: 1

World Cup
- Seasons: 6

Astrid Plank (born 30 June 1971) is an Italian former alpine skier who competed in the 1992 Winter Olympics.

== World Cup results ==
Top 10

Date	Place	Nation	Discipline	Position
22/12/1995	Veysonnaz	Switzerland	Slalom	10
17/12/1995	St. Anton	Austria	Slalom	9
18/11/1995	Beaver Creek, CO	United States	Slalom	10
12/12/1993	Veysonnaz	Switzerland	Slalom	10
06/12/1992	Steamboat Springs, CO	United States	Slalom	8
