= Jurij Repe =

Slovenian ice hockey player

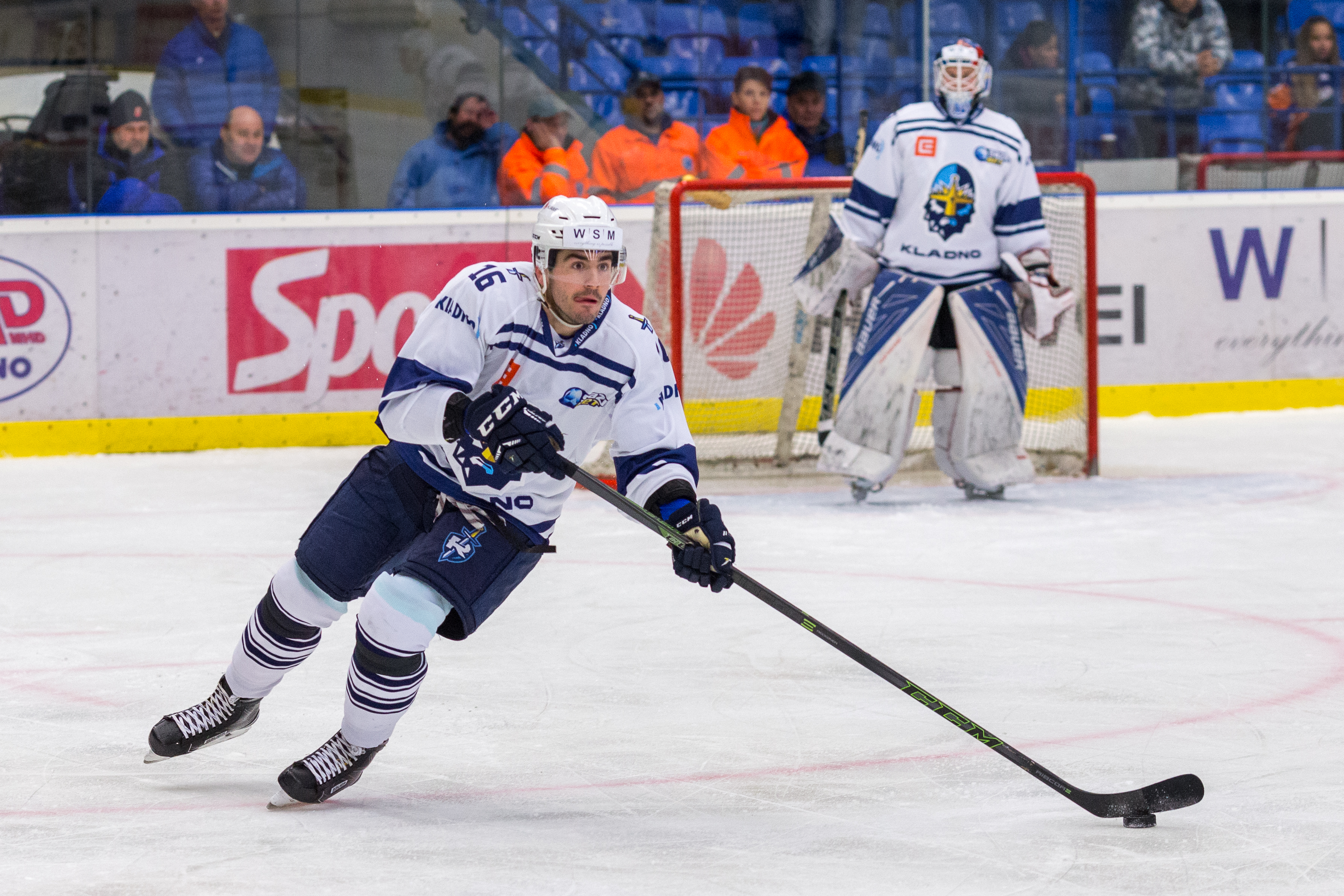
- Repe with Rytíři Kladno in 2016
- Born: September 17, 1994 (age 31) Kranj, Slovenia
- Height: 6 ft 2 in (188 cm)
- Weight: 198 lb (90 kg; 14 st 2 lb)
- Position: Defence
- Shot: Left
- team Former teams: Free agent HC Oceláři Třinec; Saint John Sea Dogs; AZ Havířov; Rytíři Kladno; Herning Blue Fox; HC Košice; HK Poprad
- National team: Slovenia
- Playing career: 2012–2021

Jurij Repe (born September 17, 1994) is a Slovenian professional ice hockey player.

Repe made his Czech Extraliga debut playing with HC Oceláři Třinec during the 2014-15 Czech Extraliga season. He also played in the 1st Czech Republic Hockey League for AZ Havířov and HC Kladno as well as in the Metal Ligaen in Denmark for the Herning Blue Fox.

Repe played for the Slovenia national team at the 2018 Winter Olympics.

== Career statistics ==
=== Regular season and playoffs ===
			Regular season					Playoffs
Season	Team	League	GP	G	A	Pts	PIM	GP	G	A	Pts	PIM
2007–08	HKMK Bled	SVN U19	3	0	0	0	0	—	—	—	—	—
2008–09	HKMK Bled	SVN U19	27	9	11	20	42	1	0	0	0	0
2009–10	HC Oceláři Třinec	CZE U16	4	0	5	5	12	—	—	—	—	—
2009–10	HC Oceláři Třinec	CZE U18	36	1	11	12	20	—	—	—	—	—
2009–10	HC Oceláři Třinec	CZE U20	1	0	0	0	0	—	—	—	—	—
2010–11	HC Oceláři Třinec	CZE U18	35	5	14	19	65	2	0	1	1	0
2010–11	HC Oceláři Třinec	CZE U20	2	0	0	0	0	—	—	—	—	—
2011–12	HC Oceláři Třinec	CZE U20	30	1	6	7	10	2	0	0	0	0
2012–13	Saint John Sea Dogs	QMJHL	38	3	8	11	46	4	1	0	1	0
2013–14	Saint John Sea Dogs	QMJHL	49	7	13	20	51	—	—	—	—	—
2014–15	HC Oceláři Třinec	ELH	1	0	0	0	4	—	—	—	—	—
2014–15	HC AZ Havířov 2010	CZE.2	41	1	6	7	40	4	0	0	0	6
2015–16	Rytíři Kladno	CZE.2	39	7	13	20	34	6	0	1	1	6
2015–16	HC Oceláři Třinec	ELH	—	—	—	—	—	2	0	0	0	2
2016–17	Rytíři Kladno	CZE.2	42	1	4	5	53	11	0	0	0	4
2017–18	Rytíři Kladno	CZE.2	31	1	9	10	20	4	0	0	0	2
2018–19	Herning Blue Fox	DEN	34	2	3	5	26	5	0	0	0	2
2019–20	HC Košice	SVK	44	5	7	12	34	—	—	—	—	—
2020–21	HK Poprad	SVK	15	0	0	0	8	—	—	—	—	—
2020–21	HC Frýdek–Místek	CZE.2	17	3	4	7	16	—	—	—	—	—
CZE.2 totals			170	13	36	49	163	25	0	1	1	18

=== International ===
Year	Team	Event	GP	G	A	Pts	PIM
2010	Slovenia	WJC18 D2	5	0	1	1	0
2011	Slovenia	WJC18 D1	5	0	2	2	10
2012	Slovenia	WJC D1A	5	0	2	2	2
2012	Slovenia	WJC18 D1A	5	0	2	2	8
2013	Slovenia	WJC D1A	3	0	0	0	8
2016	Slovenia	WC D1A	5	1	1	2	4
2016	Slovenia	OGQ	3	0	1	1	2
2017	Slovenia	WC	4	0	0	0	2
2018	Slovenia	OG	4	0	0	0	2
2019	Slovenia	WC D1A	5	0	1	1	6
2020	Slovenia	OGQ	2	0	1	1	2
Junior totals			23	0	7	7	28
Senior totals			23	1	4	5	18
