= Franco Bernabè =

Italian banker (born 1948)

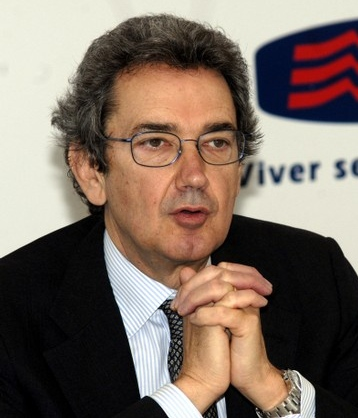
- Born: 18 September 1948 (age 78)
- Education: University of Turin
- Occupation: Banker

Franco Bernabè (born 18 September 1948) is an Italian banker and manager, formerly the chairman of the board and chief executive officer of Telecom Italia, appointed on 3 December 2007.

== Biography ==
Bernabè was born at Vipiteno/Sterzing (Italy). He graduated in 1973 from the University of Turin and worked as a post-graduate fellow in economics at the Einaudi Foundation from 1973 to 1975. He is the author of several publications in economics and has received an honorary doctorate in Environmental Sciences from the University of Parma.

He joined Eni in 1983 as an assistant to the chairman and subsequently became the Head of Corporate Planning, Financial Control, and Corporate Development, and in 1992 Chief Executive Officer. Prior to his joining Eni, he worked in the planning department of Fiat as a Chief Economist. He started his career as a Senior Economist at the OECD Department of Economics and Statistics in Paris.

Bernabè has served pro bono on different public assignments: in 1999 he was appointed by the Italian Prime Minister as a special representative of the Italian government for the reconstruction of Kosovo; between 2001 and 2003 he was the chairman of La Biennale di Venezia, and since 2004 he is the chairman of Mart, the foremost Italian museum of modern art. He has served on the advisory board of the Council on Foreign Relations and currently serves on the board of the Peres Center for Peace, and on the advisory board of the Observatoire Méditerranéen de l'Énergie. In the past, Bernabè has also served on the boards of several Italian and international listed companies.

Bernabè has also been chairman and majority shareholder of FB Group, an investment company that he founded in 1999, which was active in the areas of ICT and renewable energy. He has been particularly active in the telecom sector - as a founder of Andala H3G, and as one of the controlling shareholders of Netscalibur and Telit, contributing to the turnaround of the two companies – and in the software sector through the companies of the Kelyan Group, focusing on ICT solutions for the extended enterprise as well as on value-added services for the telecommunication industry. Besides, he is a Vice Chairman of Rothschild Europe. Between 2012 and 2015 he was a member of the steering committee of the Bilderberg Group.
