= Markus Gander =

Italian ice hockey player

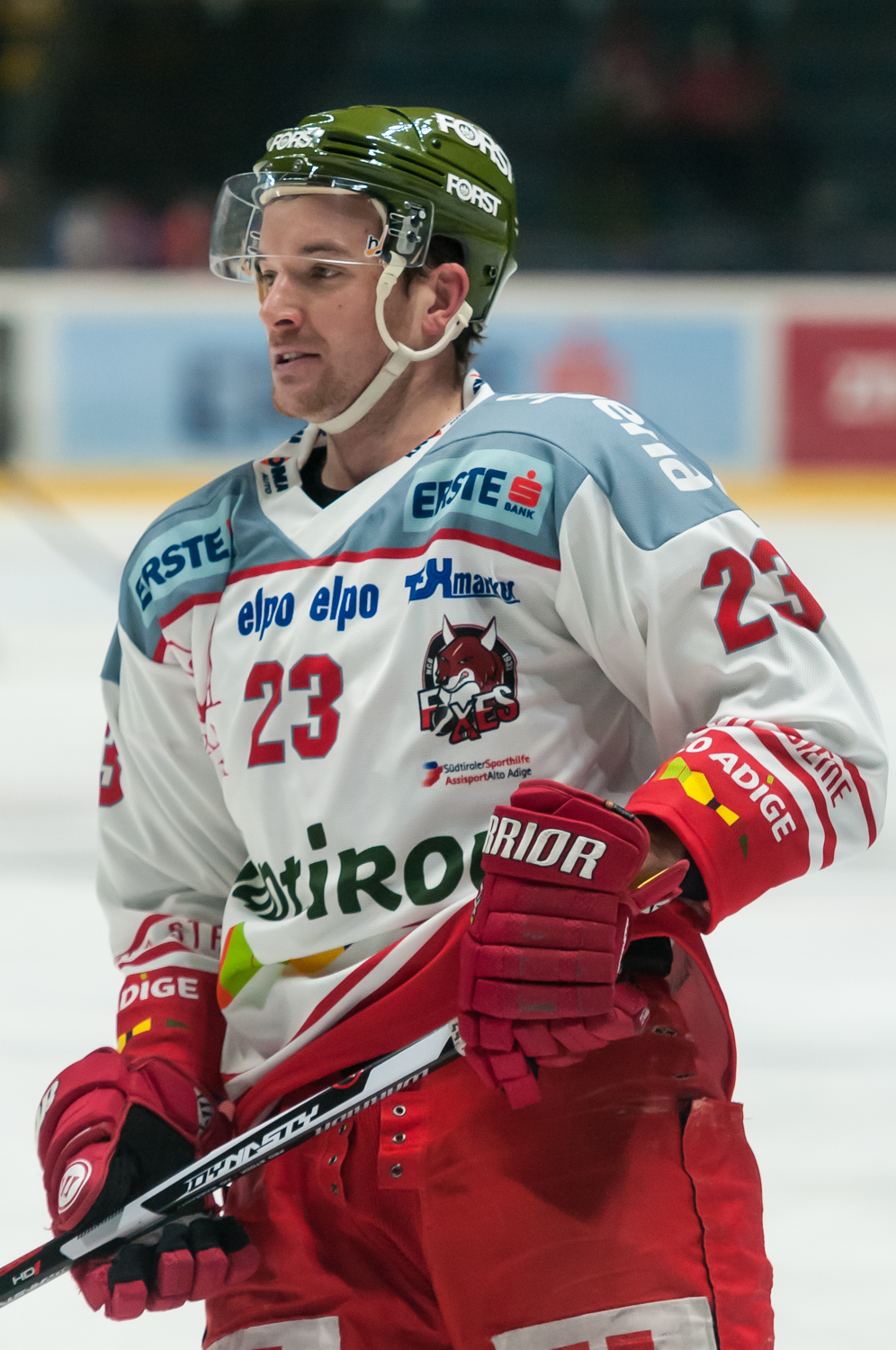
- Born: May 16, 1989 (age 36) Sterzing, Italy
- Height: 6 ft 1 in (185 cm)
- Weight: 198 lb (90 kg; 14 st 2 lb)
- Position: Right wing
- Shoots: Right
- EBEL team Former teams: HC Bolzano; Sterzing-Vipiteno Broncos
- National team: Italy
- NHL draft: Undrafted
- Playing career: 2010–present

Markus Gander (born May 16, 1989) is an Italian professional ice hockey player. He currently plays for the Italian club HCB South Tyrol in the Austrian Hockey League (EBEL).

Gander was named to the Italy national ice hockey team for competition at the 2014 IIHF World Championship.
