= Sterzing =

- Comune
- Stadtgemeinde Sterzing; Comune di Vipiteno
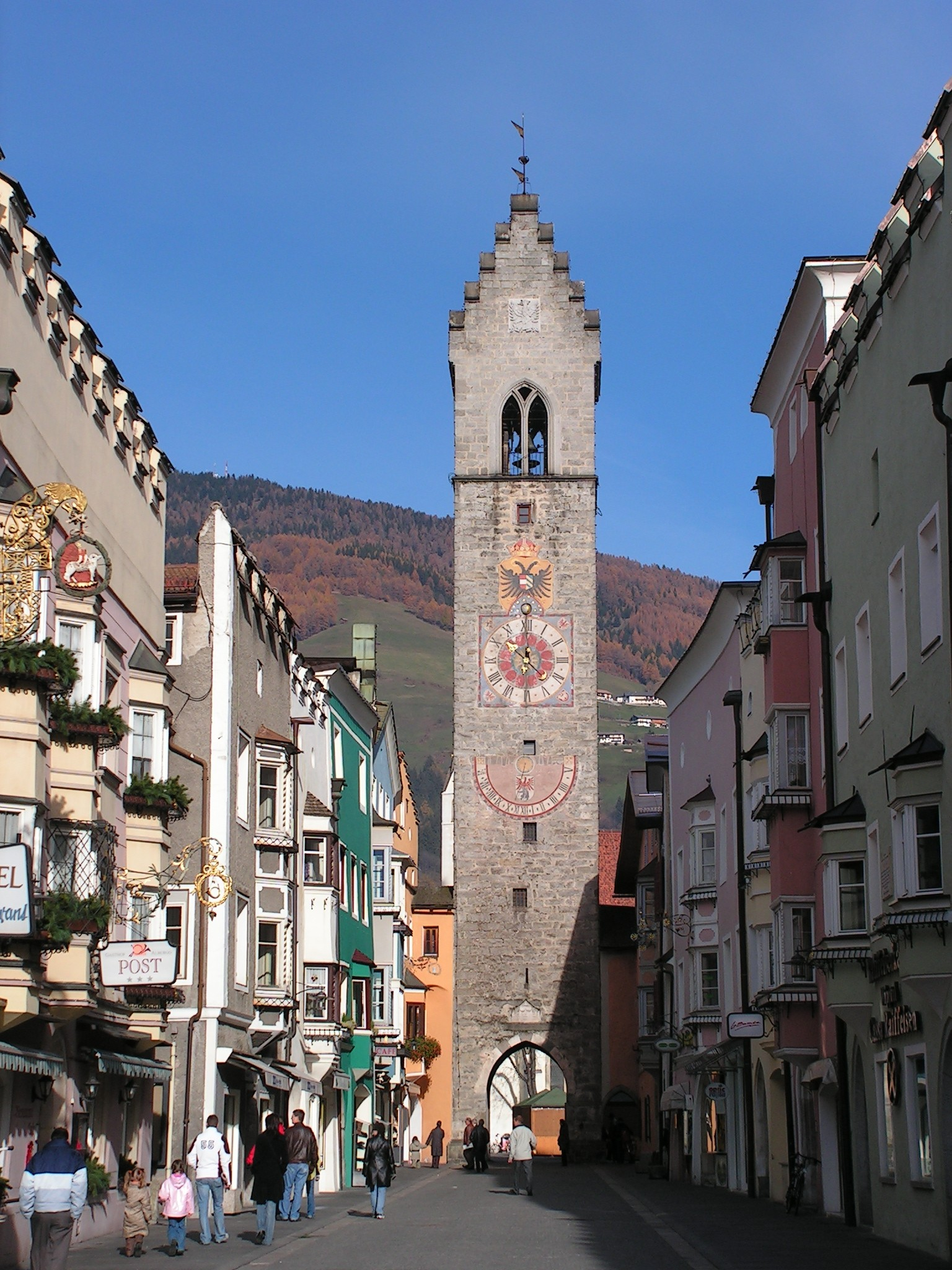
- The Zwölferturm in Sterzing

- Location within Italy Location within Trentino-Alto Adige/Südtirol
- Coordinates: 46°53′N 11°26′E
- Country: Italy
- Region: Trentino-Alto Adige/Südtirol
- Province: South Tyrol (BZ)
- Frazioni: Ried (Novale), Thuins (Tunes), Tschöfs (Ceves)

Government
  - Mayor: Peter Volgger

Area
  - Total: 33 km^{2} (13 sq mi)
- Elevation: 950 m (3,120 ft)

Population (2025)
  - Total: 7,050 (approx.)
  - Density: 210/km^{2} (550/sq mi)
- Demonym(s): German: Sterzinger; Italian: vipitenesi
- Time zone: UTC+1 (CET)
  - Summer (DST): UTC+2 (CEST)
- Postal code: 39049
- Dialing code: 0472
- Website: Official website

Sterzing (German pronunciation: [ˈʃtɛrtsɪŋ]; Italian: Vipiteno [vipiˈtɛːno]) is a comune in South Tyrol in northern Italy. It is the main town of the southern Wipptal, and the Eisack River flows through the medieval town. It is one of I Borghi più belli d'Italia ("The most beautiful villages of Italy").

== History ==
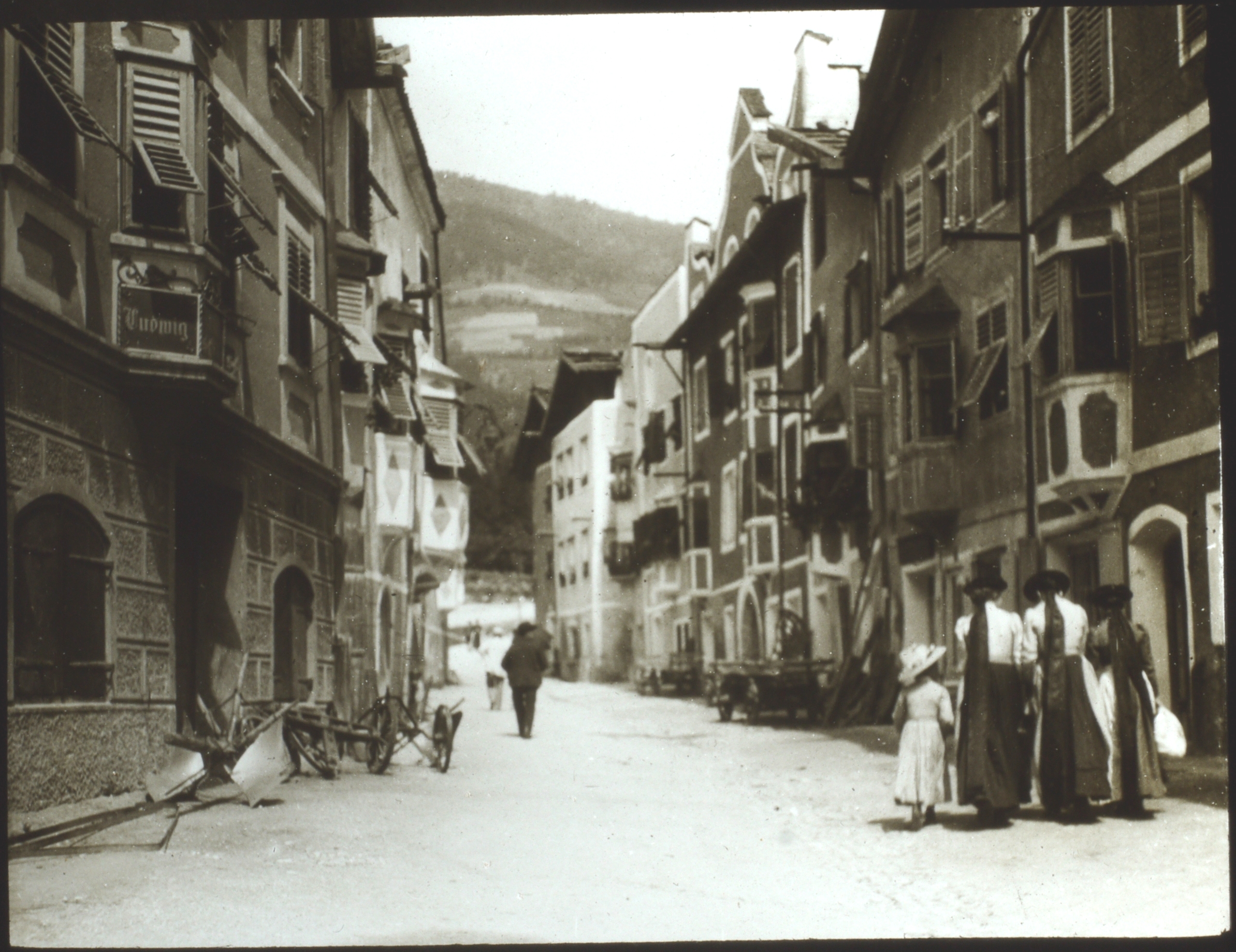
Sterzing in August 1912 by A.E.Hasse

=== Origin ===
The town traces its roots to 14 B.C., when Nero Claudius Drusus founded a military camp called "Vipitenum" along the road between what are now Italy and Austria. Ancient ruins found nearby include a sepulchral monument dedicated to Postumia Vittorina, a milestone of the Imperator Septimius Severus period and a stone altar dedicated to Lord Mithras. The first mention of a town called Wibitina dates back to the years between 985 and 990. That name, which is still memorized in Wipptal, is traced back to the nearby Celto-Roman settlement Vibidina.

In 1182, the German name Sterçengum appears in a document of the Sonnenburg abbey.

In 1280, Duke Meinhard of Carinthia, promoted the town to the rank of city. As the region's proximity to the Brenner Pass made it a frequent trade route, the Fugger of Augsburg opened a branch to sort the products of the nearby silver mines in Ridnaun Valley and Pfleres Valley. Sterzing knew its magnificence in the 15th and 16th centuries after the 1443 fire which destroyed part of the town. New embattled houses were built, some late gothic style, in Neustadt (New Town) as: Town and Regional Trial House (1450), Hotel "Goldenes Kreuz" (1446), Fugger's Branch (1553), Rafenstein House (former Köchl, 1472), the Town Hall (1473), Geizkofler House (1600) and the Mining District House (1500) all still in use.

The town is mentioned in several sources from the 16th to 19th centuries as Störzingen. In the course of the Italianization of South Tyrol, the modern Italian name of the town Vipiteno - created from the old Roman settlement of Vipitenum - was made official. Throughout the late 1940s and early 1950s, a number of wanted Nazis stayed in Sterzing at the Hotel Goldenes Kreuz which still exists today. At different times, people like Erich Priebke, Adolf Eichmann, and Josef Mengele were in transit here as they waited for forged passports for their journey out of Europe and by ship to South America.

=== Coat of arms ===
King Henry I, Count of Tyrol, granted a seal, similar to the present, depicting a crippled pilgrim with a stick and the rosary above the Tyrolean eagle, this appeared as a coat of arms August 30, 1328. In 1524, the pilgrim is shown as a monk above the Tyrolean eagle.

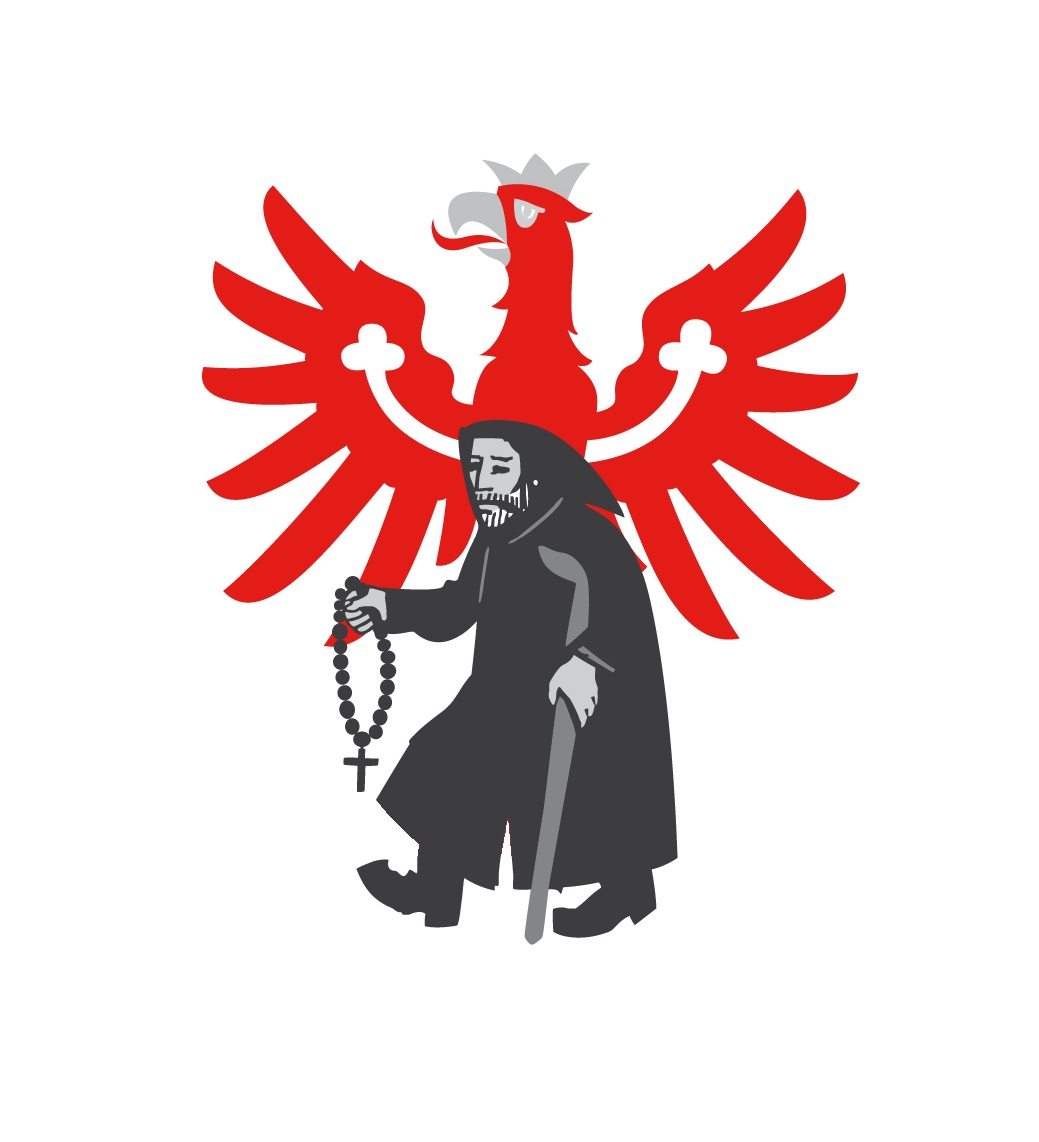
Coat of Arms Sterzing

== Main sights ==
=== Religious architecture ===
==== Parish of "Our Lady of Marsh" ====
The Parish is the biggest church between Verona and Munich and was built from 1417 to 1451. The gothic altar, woodwork by Hans Multscher of Ulm, is 12 metres (39 ft) high and was completed in 1458. The church was later enlarged from 1497 to 1525 by Hans Lutz. In 1753, the church was then modified in baroque style, with paintings by Adam Mölk, and the gothic altar removed; presently the altar is on display at the Multscher Museum.

==== Holy Spirit Church ====
The Holy Spirit Church is the oldest gothic church in town. Built in 1399, in the same main building of the old Hospital, is located in the Town Square; the nave is painted in fresco by Giovanni of Bruneck (1402).

==== Saint Elisabeth Chapel ====
Saint Elisabeth Chapel is part of the Deutschhaus and was built in Baroque in 1729–33 by Giuseppe Delai. It has an octagonal plan with a rectangular sector concerning the altar and the choir. The dome frescos represent the patron saint and the coat-of-arms of the Teutonic Order were painted by Matthäus Günther.

==== Kapuzinerkirche ====
The church was built in 1636 and was consecrated the following year to Saint Mary Magdalene; it has a rectangular apse and a lateral chapel dedicated to the Immaculate Conception. The image in the niche on the façade represent the patron saint and is a work of the 17th century. The altarpieces presumably were painted by Josef Renzler in 1800 circa and represent Saint Mary Magdalene with Saint Francis and Saint Anthony; on the lateral altars are depicted Saint Felix and Saint Anthony of Padua.

==== Saint Margaret Church ====
The present church was built on the initiative of Bishop Paulinus Mayr in early Tyrolean baroque on a project of Peter Delai in 1678. The old church, mentioned for the first time in 1337, was restored and enlarged between 1459 and 1463 in gothic. In 1678, it was completely demolished, rebuilt, and consecrated in 1681. The bell tower is detached from the church and it comes from the previous church, in 1624, the Romanic tower was demolished and built the present. The façade was inspired by to renaissance with the characteristic Palladian tripartite windows. In the niches are placed the wooden sculptures of Saint Margaret and Saint Agnes and above the portal is a fresco showing the Last Supper. The imposing interior has one nave, large windows, and a vaulted ceiling with lunettes. The great high altar has six columns and an altarpiece representing the Coronation of Mary painted by Joseph Renzler in 1822, beside are two wood-carving of the Saints Francis Xavier and John of Nepomuk. Above the altar on the right is placed a statue of the Madonna with Child of 17th century bordered by the Rosary formed by fifteen painted discs presumably by Joseph Mildorfer.

=== Civil architecture ===
==== Zwölferturm ====
The Zwölferturm is a 46 m. high tower erected in 1470, it is the symbol of the city that divides the New Town from Old Town. A fire in 1867 destroyed the original spire, which was replaced with the present embattled roof.

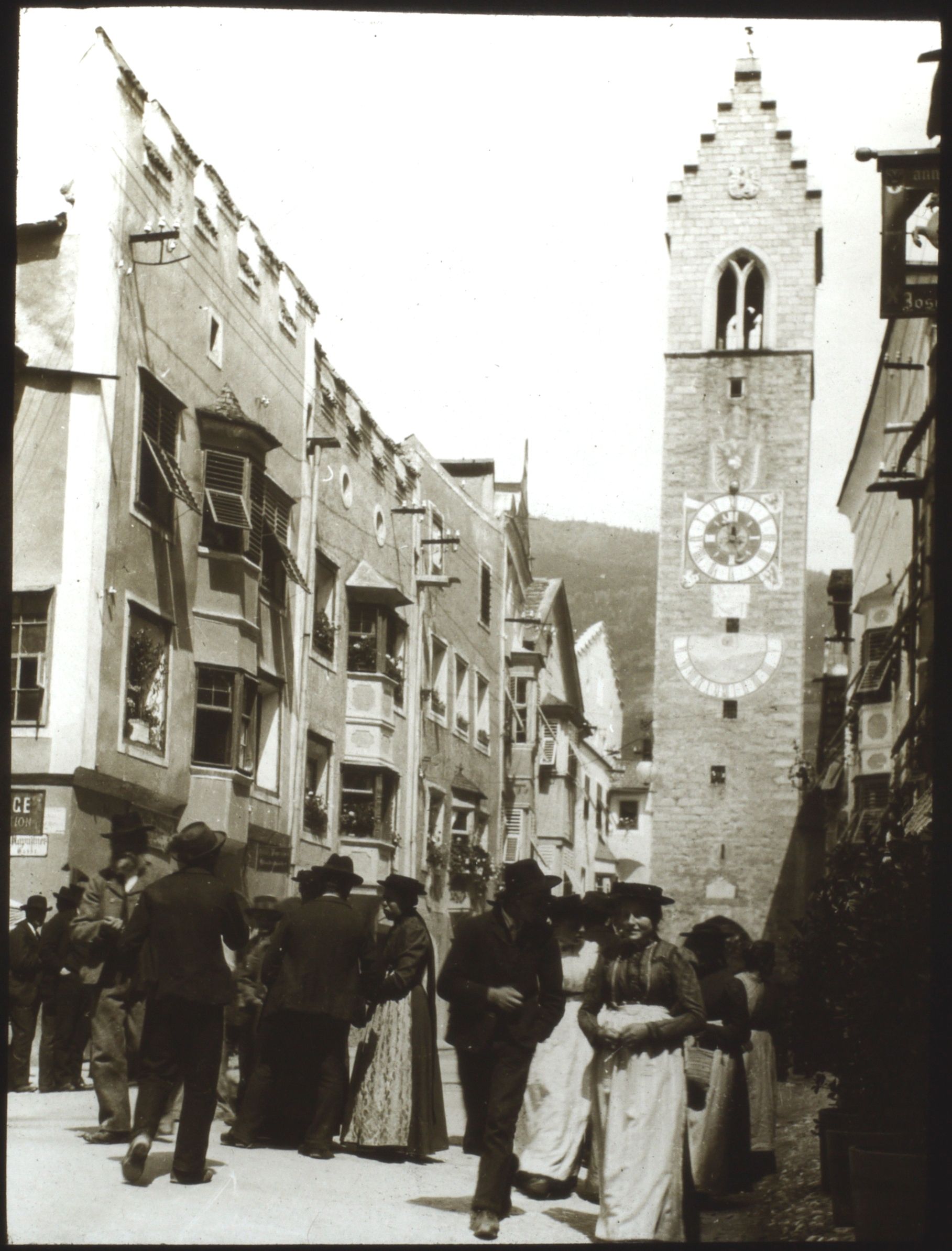
Sterzing (Aug 1912) - Zwölferturm

==== Town Hall ====
Built in 1468–72 in late gothic style while, the angular "Erker" was added in 1526. In the patio take place a Roman stone altar, dedicated to Lord Mithras and a milestone of the Imperator Septimius Severus; the same period the military road was completed in 200 A.D.

==== New Town (Neustadt) ====
It is the main street of the old city centre with buildings erected after the 1417 fire, during a period when the town was prosperous with the trade and the silver mines in the nearby Ridnaun Valley and Pflersch Valley.

=== Military architecture ===
==== Reifenstein Castle ====
Outside the city is the Reifenstein Castle, one of the best-preserved medieval castles in the province.

== Notable people ==
=== Olden times ===
- Vigil Raber (1490–1552) restorer and painter, later writer and editor and pianist
- Michael Gaismair (1490 Sterzing – 1532), Social revolutionary, Master builder, leader of the German Peasants' War (1524–1525)
- Michael Toxites (1514–1581), Doctor, Humanist and Literary man
- Kasper Goltwurm (1524, Sterzing – 1559), Lutheran theologian

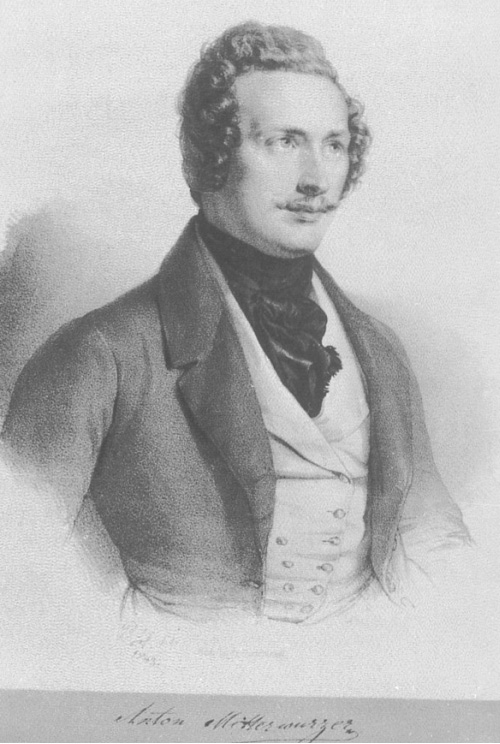
Anton Mitterwurzer, 1843

=== More modern times ===
- Johann Baptist Gänsbacher (1778–1844) composer and conductor
- Anton Mitterwurzer (1818–76) baritone opera singer
- Carl Domanig (1851–1913), Writer
- Konrad Fischnaller (1855, Sterzing – 1941), teacher and historian
- Andreas Khol (born 1941) an Austrian politician, raised in Sterzing
- Alexander Langer (1946–1995) Italian journalist, peace activist, politician, translator and teacher.
- Franco Bernabè (born 1948) banker, formerly CEO of Telecom Italia
- Johannes Pramsohler (born 1980) a violinist, conductor and record producer

=== Sport ===
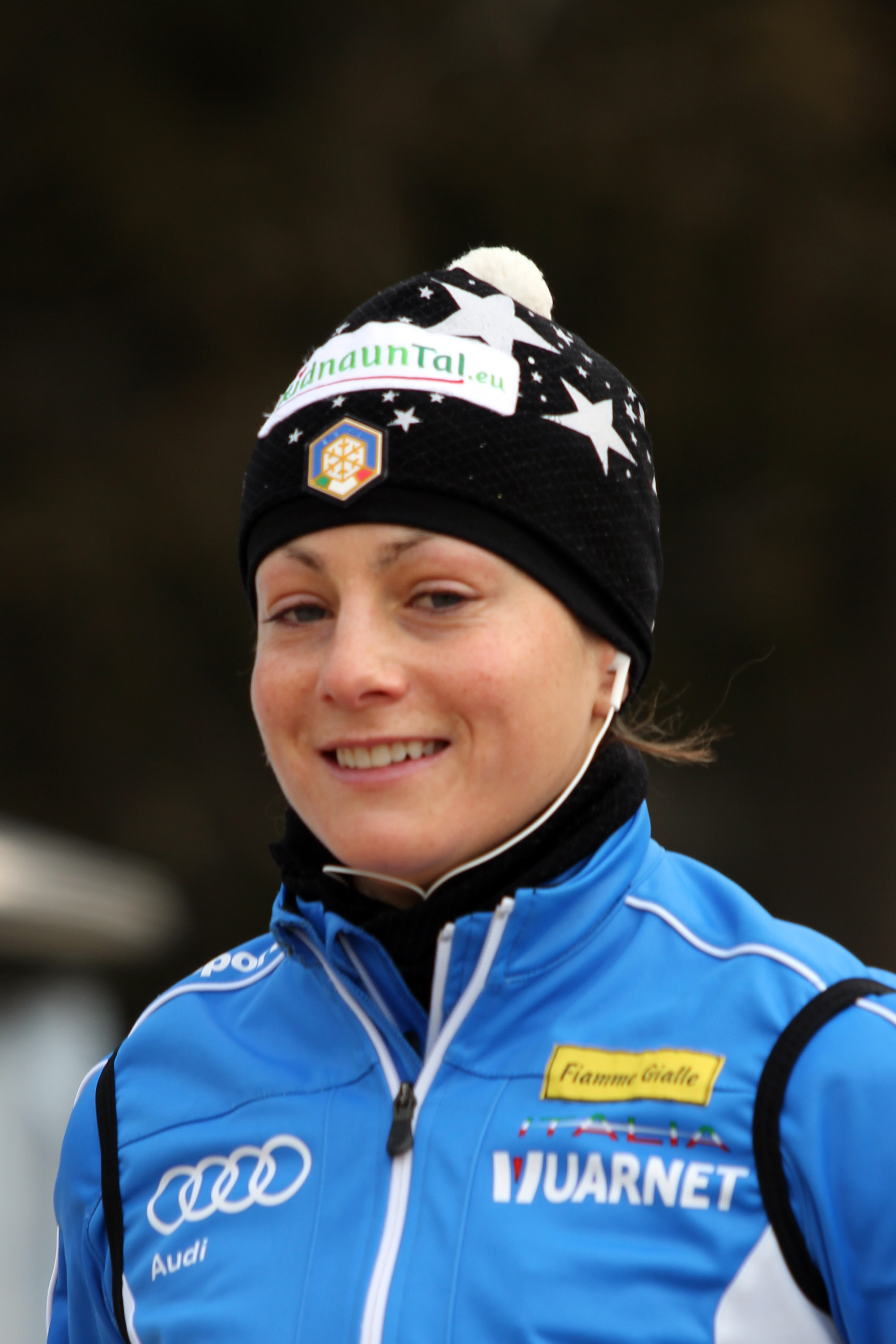
Katja Haller, 2011

- Carlo Gartner (1922–2013) alpine skier, competed in the 1948 and 1952 Winter Olympics
- Herbert Plank (born 1954) alpine skier, competed in the 1976 and 1980 Winter Olympics
- Oswald Tötsch (born 1964) former alpine skier, competed in the 1984 and 1988 Winter Olympics
- Josef Polig (born 1968) former Alpine skier, gold medallist in the 1992 Winter Olympics
- Gerhard Plankensteiner (born 1971) luger, bronze medallist at the 2006 Winter Olympics
- Astrid Plank (born 1971) former alpine skier, competed in the 1992 Winter Olympics
- Reinhold Rainer (born 1973) luger, competed in four Winter Olympics
- Stéphanie Jiménez (born 1974) an Andorran mountain runner, lives in Sterzing
- Devis Da Canal (born 1976) biathlete, competed at the 2002 Winter Olympics
- Silvia Weissteiner (born 1979) long-distance runner, competed at the 2008 and 2012 Summer Olympics
- Katja Haller (born 1981) professional biathlete, competed in three Summer Olympics
- Alex Schwazer (born 1984), former race walker
- Hans Peter Fischnaller (born 1985), luger
- Markus Gander (born 1989), ice hockey player
- Sandra Gasparini (born 1990) luger, competed at the 2010 Winter Olympics
- Ivan Deluca (born 1997), ice hockey player

== Society ==
=== Linguistic distribution ===
According to the 2024 census, 67.66% of the population speak German, 32.08% Italian and 0.27% Ladin as first language.

=== Culture ===
- Sterzing/Vipiteno is a site to the Orfeo Music Festival, a renowned classical music event
- The ice hockey team Wipptal Broncos is based in the town

== Economy ==
=== Industry ===
Sterzing is home of the Leitner Group, an international industry, a manufacturer of cable systems, snowgroomer, utility tracked vehicles, systems for urban rail called minimetrò, and wind turbines.

=== Transport ===
The nearest airport is Innsbruck Airport, which is located 54 km (34 mi) north of the town.

== International relations ==
=== Twin towns – Sister cities ===
Sterzing is twinned with:

- Kitzbühel, Tyrol, Austria, since 1971

== Gallery ==
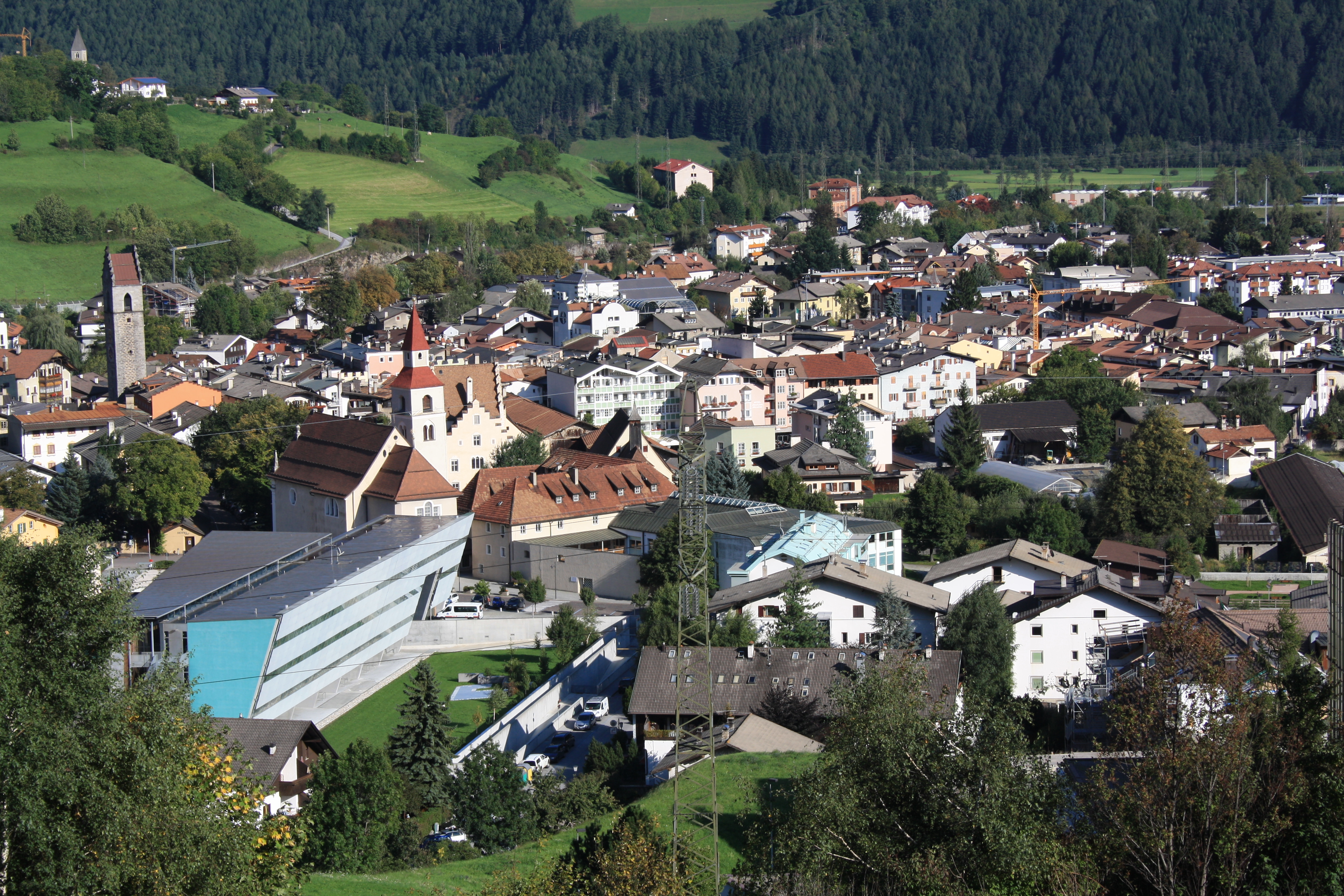
A close sight of the inner town

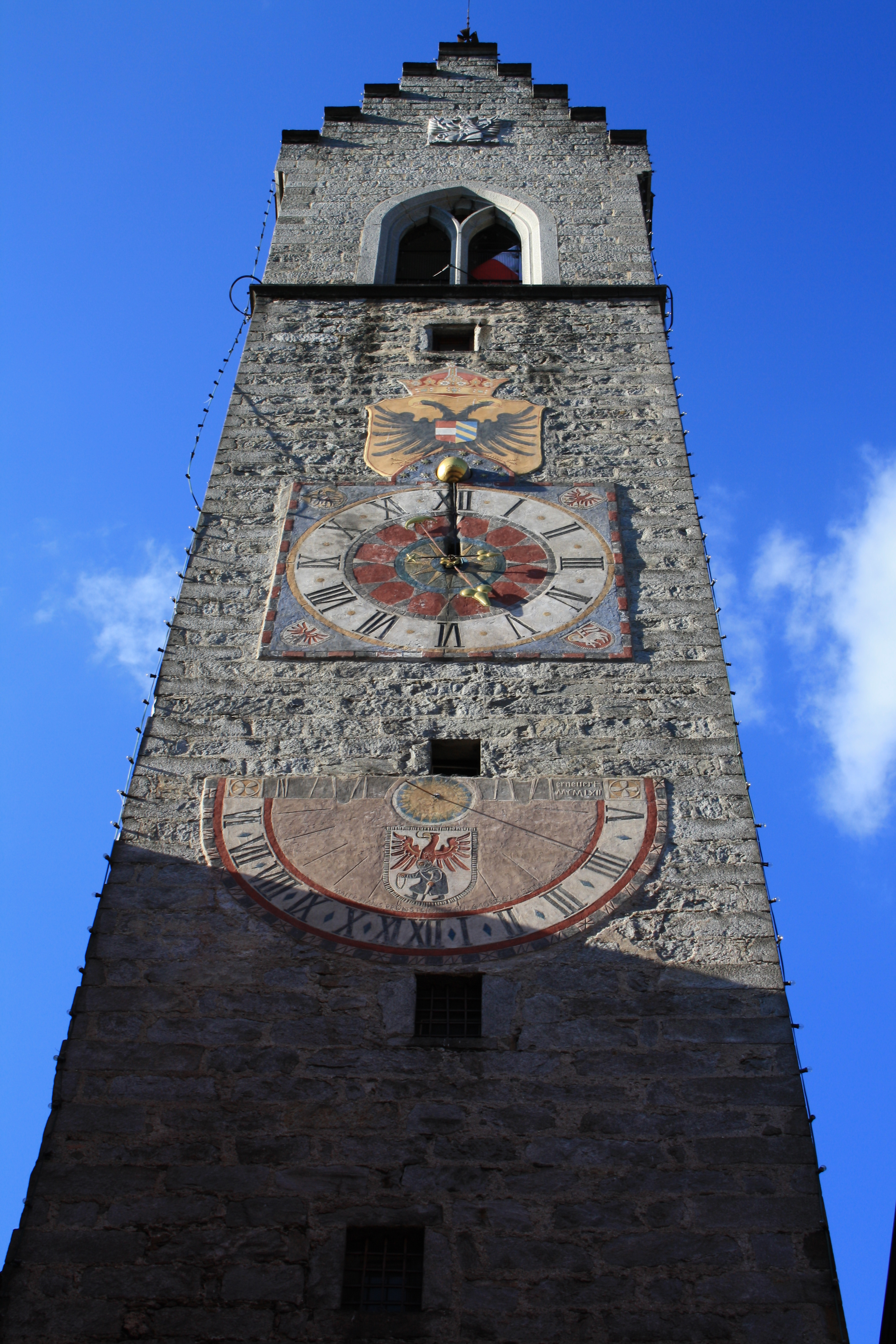
The town's symbol, the "Zwölferturm", is 46 metres (151 ft) high and was built in 1472.

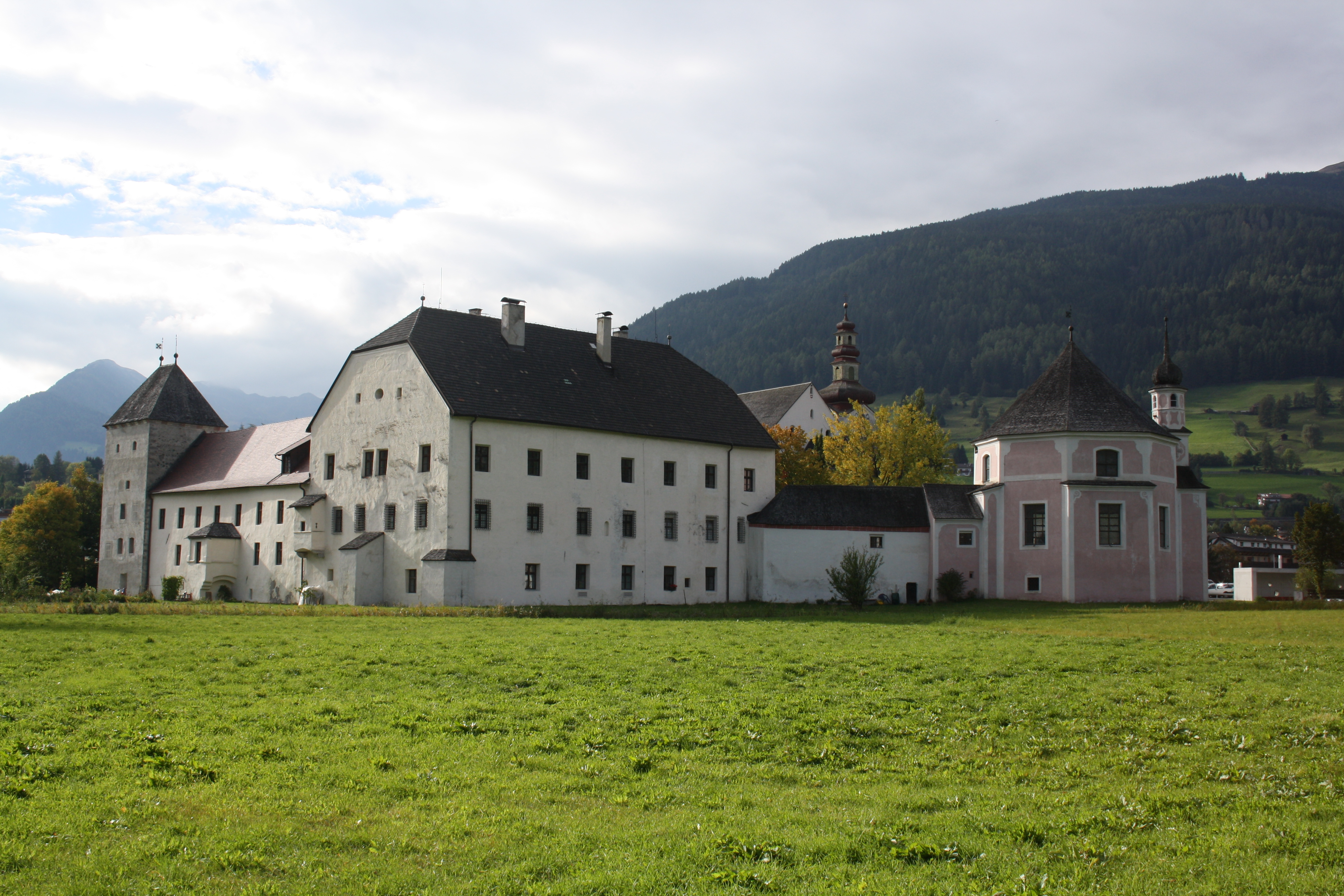
The Multscher Museum: Exposition of ancient maps, documents and the plans for building the Parish altar by Hans Multscher

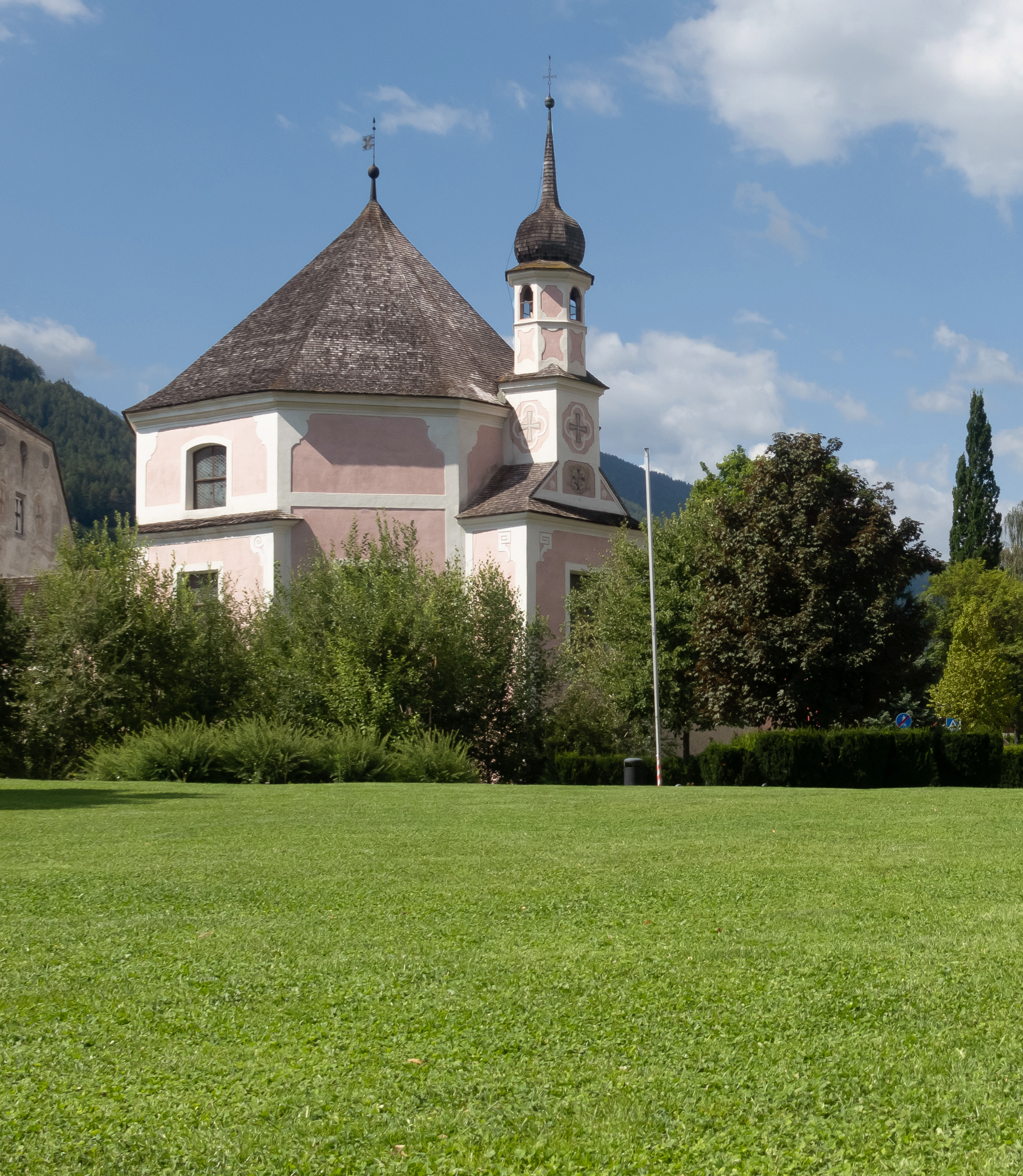
Saint Elisabeth Chapel

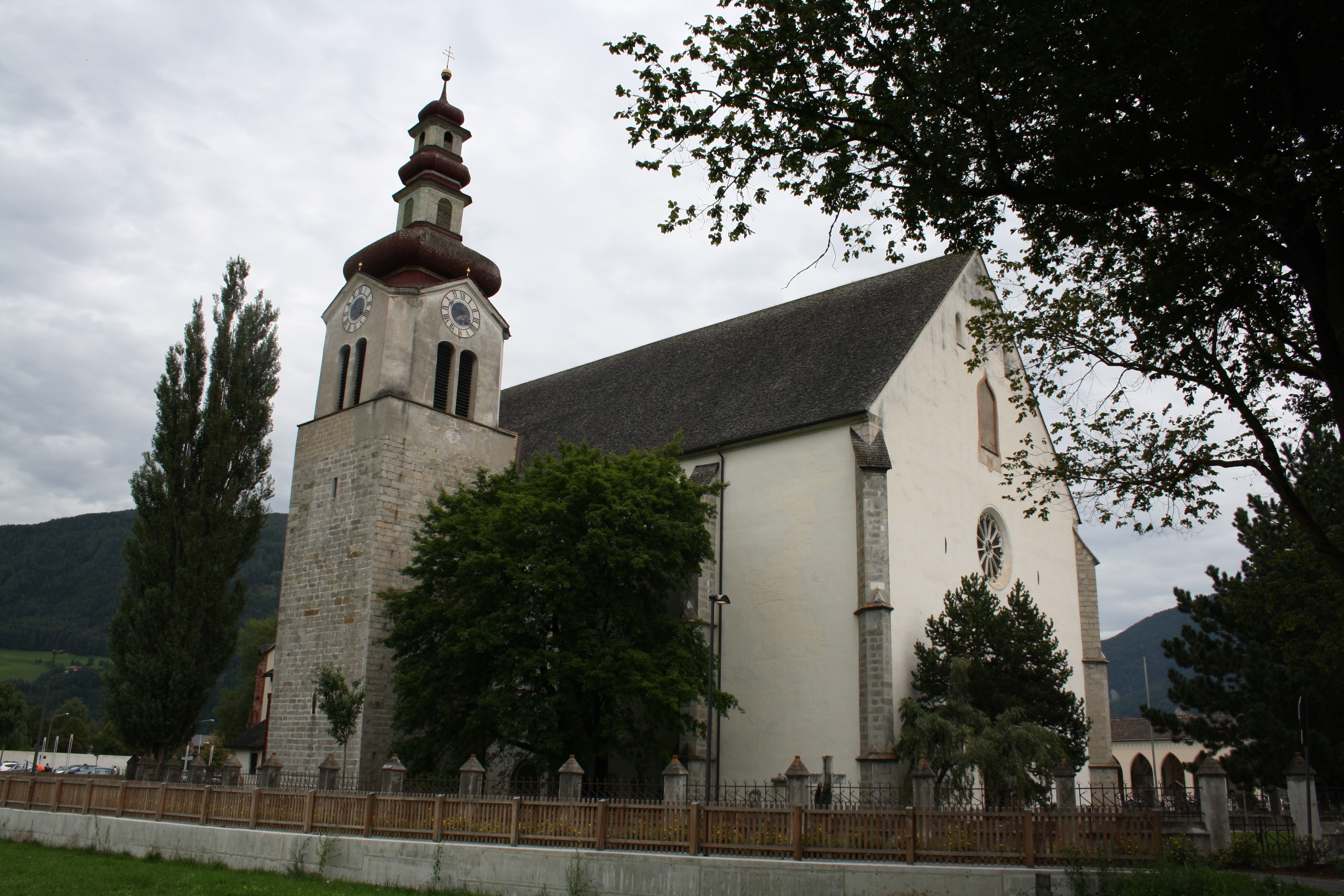
External sight of the Parish "Our Lady of Marsh"

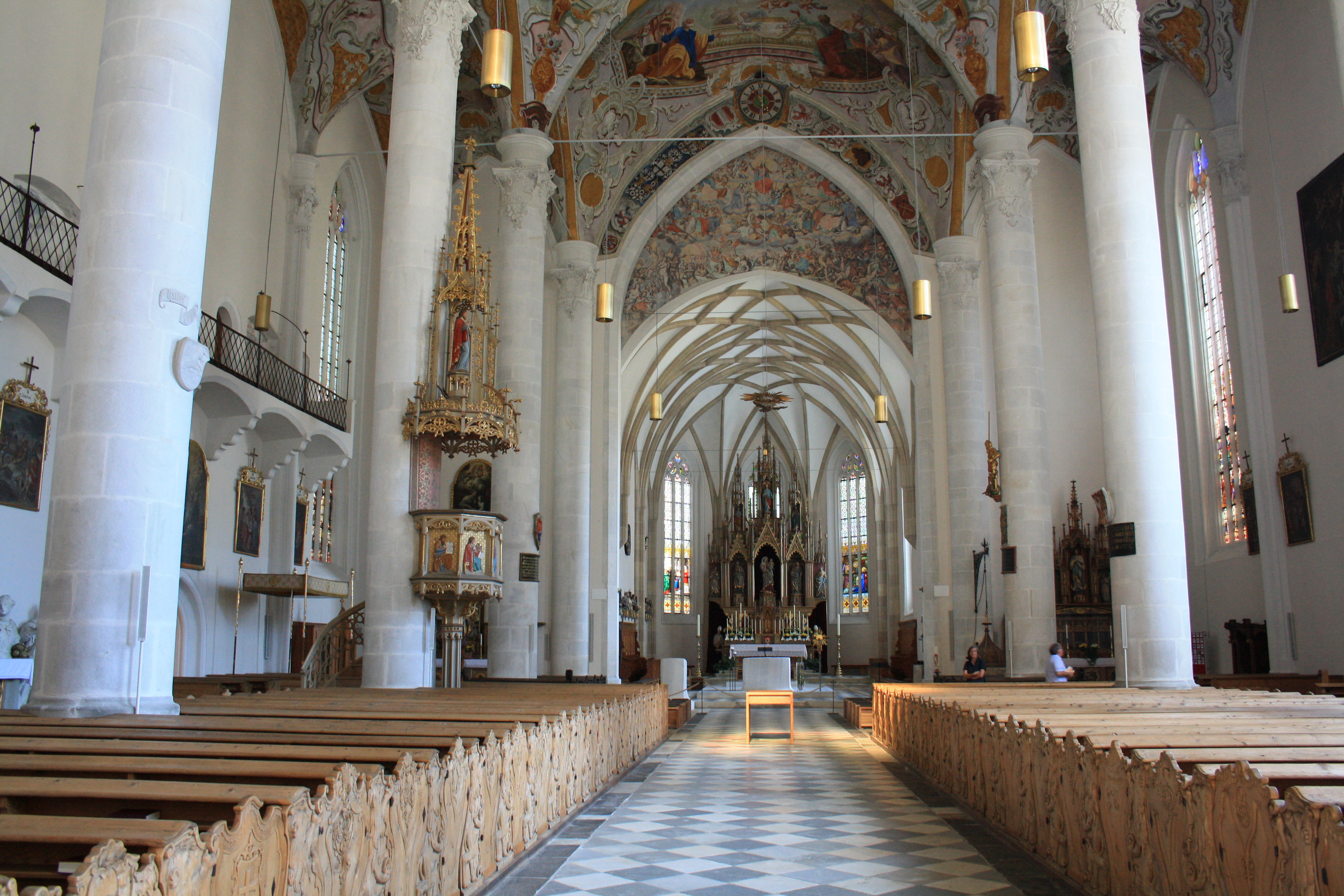
The central nave with frescos by Adam Mölk

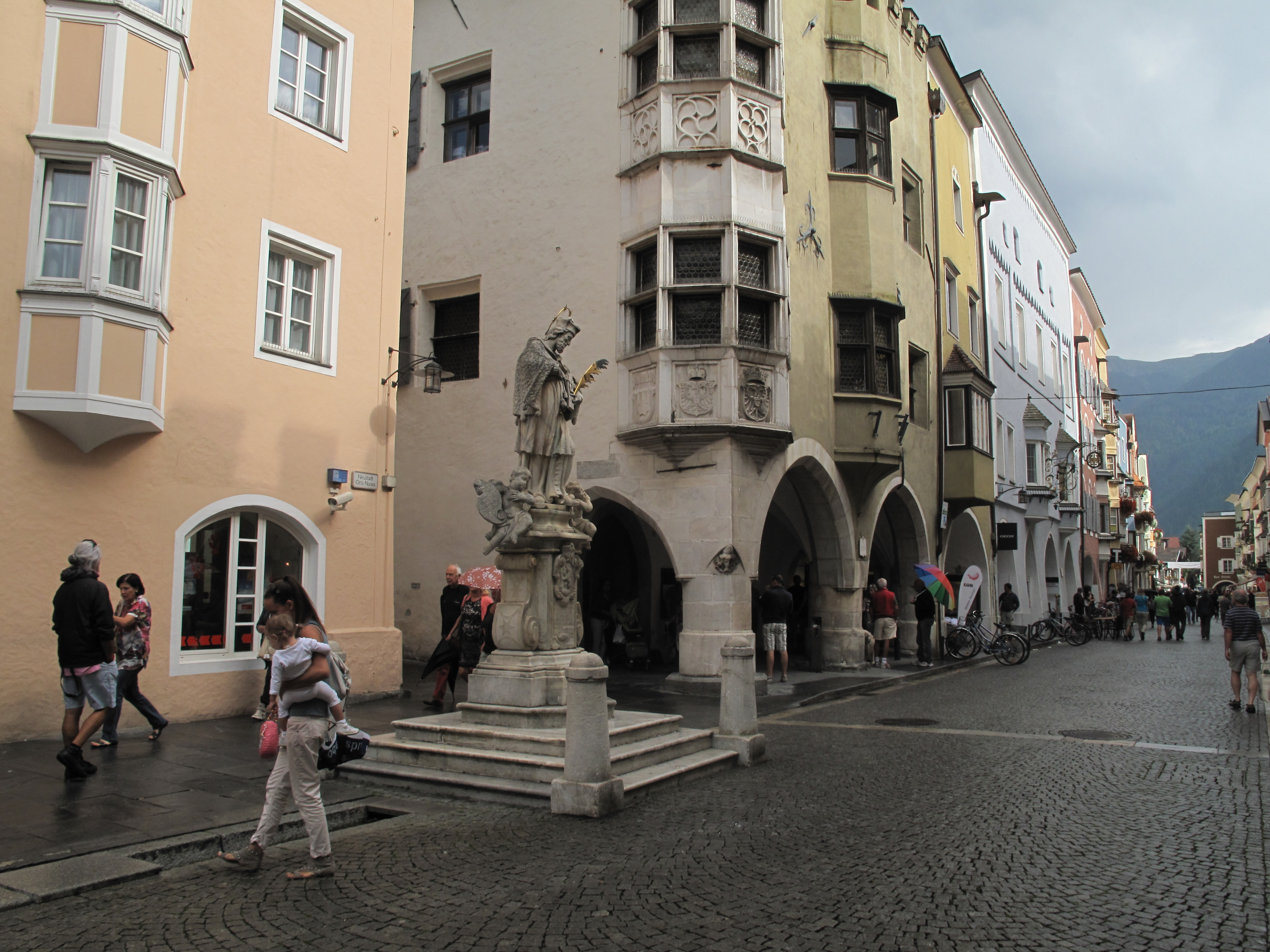
Sculpture at the Neustadt

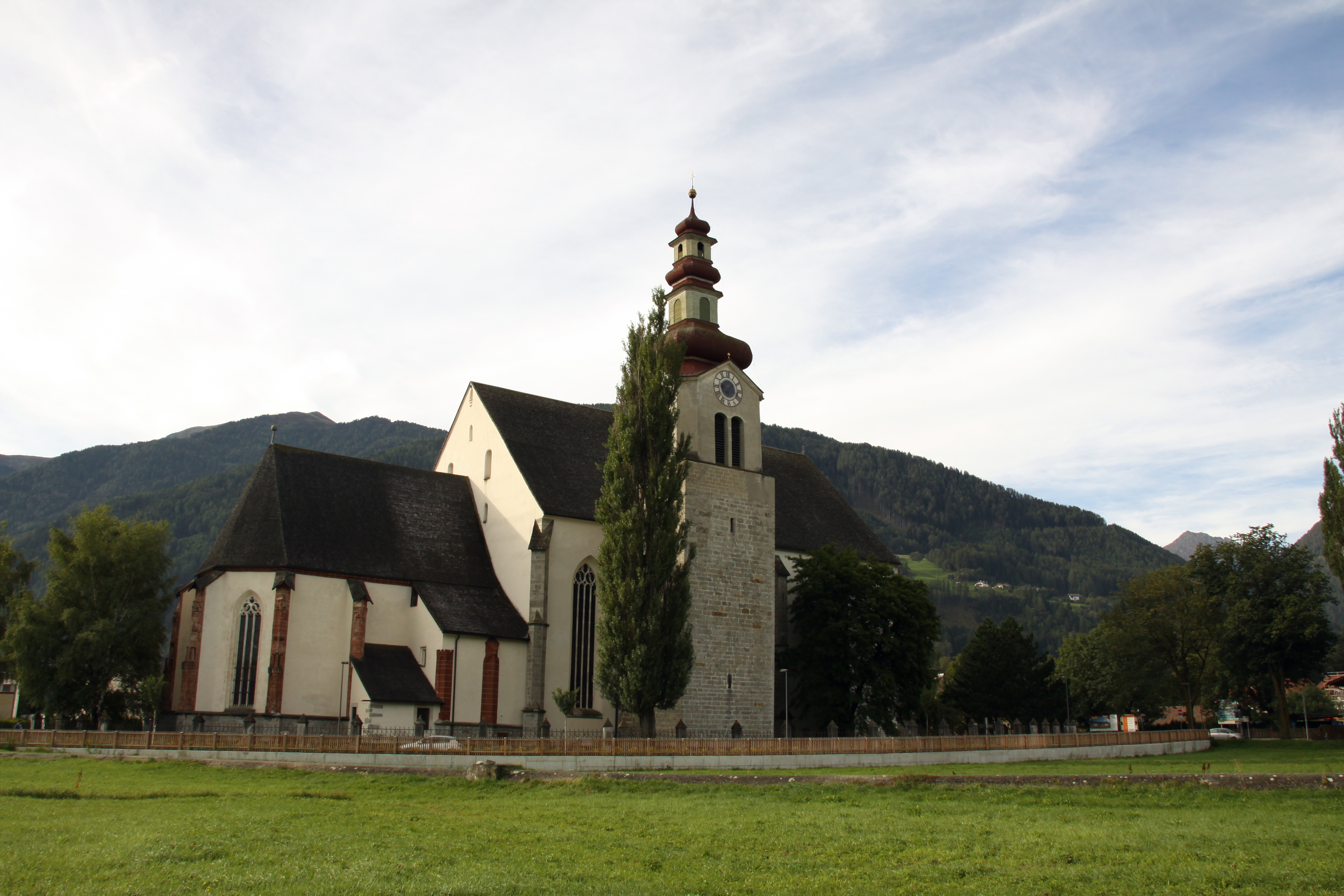
Parish church
