= Ice hockey at the 2010 Winter Olympics – Men's team rosters =

These were the team rosters of the nations participating in the men's ice hockey tournament of the 2010 Winter Olympics. Each team was permitted a roster of 20 skaters and 3 goaltenders.

== Group A ==
=== Canada ===
The following is the Canadian roster in the men's ice hockey tournament of the 2010 Winter Olympics.

No.	Pos.	Name	Height	Weight	Birthdate	Birthplace	2009–10 team
30	G	Martin Brodeur	188 cm (6 ft 2 in)	98 kg (216 lb)	6 May 1972	Montreal, QC	(United States) New Jersey Devils (NHL)
29	G	Marc-André Fleury	188 cm (6 ft 2 in)	82 kg (181 lb)	28 November 1984	Sorel-Tracy, QC	(United States) Pittsburgh Penguins (NHL)
1	G	Roberto Luongo	191 cm (6 ft 3 in)	93 kg (205 lb)	4 April 1979	Montreal, QC	(Canada) Vancouver Canucks (NHL)
22	D	Dan Boyle	180 cm (5 ft 11 in)	86 kg (190 lb)	12 July 1976	Ottawa, ON	(United States) San Jose Sharks (NHL)
8	D	Drew Doughty	185 cm (6 ft 1 in)	92 kg (203 lb)	8 December 1989	London, ON	(United States) Los Angeles Kings (NHL)
2	D	Duncan Keith	183 cm (6 ft 0 in)	85 kg (187 lb)	16 July 1983	Winnipeg, MB	(United States) Chicago Blackhawks (NHL)
27	D	Scott Niedermayer – C	185 cm (6 ft 1 in)	91 kg (201 lb)	31 August 1973	Cranbrook, BC	(United States) Anaheim Ducks (NHL)
20	D	Chris Pronger – A	198 cm (6 ft 6 in)	101 kg (223 lb)	10 October 1974	Dryden, ON	(United States) Philadelphia Flyers (NHL)
7	D	Brent Seabrook	191 cm (6 ft 3 in)	100 kg (220 lb)	20 April 1985	Richmond, BC	(United States) Chicago Blackhawks (NHL)
6	D	Shea Weber	193 cm (6 ft 4 in)	103 kg (227 lb)	14 August 1985	Sicamous, BC	(United States) Nashville Predators (NHL)
37	F	Patrice Bergeron	188 cm (6 ft 2 in)	88 kg (194 lb)	24 July 1985	L'Ancienne-Lorette, QC	(United States) Boston Bruins (NHL)
87	F	Sidney Crosby – A	180 cm (5 ft 11 in)	90 kg (200 lb)	7 August 1987	Cole Harbour, NS	(United States) Pittsburgh Penguins (NHL)
51	F	Ryan Getzlaf	193 cm (6 ft 4 in)	100 kg (220 lb)	10 May 1985	Regina, SK	(United States) Anaheim Ducks (NHL)
15	F	Dany Heatley	191 cm (6 ft 3 in)	100 kg (220 lb)	21 January 1981	Freiburg im Breisgau, West Germany	(United States) San Jose Sharks (NHL)
12	F	Jarome Iginla – A	185 cm (6 ft 1 in)	95 kg (209 lb)	1 July 1977	Edmonton, AB	(Canada) Calgary Flames (NHL)
11	F	Patrick Marleau	188 cm (6 ft 2 in)	100 kg (220 lb)	15 September 1979	Swift Current, SK	(United States) San Jose Sharks (NHL)
10	F	Brenden Morrow	180 cm (5 ft 11 in)	95 kg (209 lb)	16 January 1979	Carlyle, SK	(United States) Dallas Stars (NHL)
61	F	Rick Nash	193 cm (6 ft 4 in)	99 kg (218 lb)	16 June 1984	Brampton, ON	(United States) Columbus Blue Jackets (NHL)
18	F	Mike Richards	180 cm (5 ft 11 in)	91 kg (201 lb)	11 February 1985	Kenora, ON	(United States) Philadelphia Flyers (NHL)
24	F	Corey Perry	191 cm (6 ft 3 in)	95 kg (209 lb)	16 May 1985	Peterborough, ON	(United States) Anaheim Ducks (NHL)
21	F	Eric Staal	193 cm (6 ft 4 in)	93 kg (205 lb)	29 October 1984	Thunder Bay, ON	(United States) Carolina Hurricanes (NHL)
19	F	Joe Thornton	193 cm (6 ft 4 in)	107 kg (236 lb)	2 July 1979	London, ON	(United States) San Jose Sharks (NHL)
16	F	Jonathan Toews	188 cm (6 ft 2 in)	96 kg (212 lb)	29 April 1988	Winnipeg, MB	(United States) Chicago Blackhawks (NHL)

Defencemen Jay Bouwmeester and Stéphane Robidas, forwards Jeff Carter, Steven Stamkos and Martin St. Louis, and goaltender Chris Mason were selected as reserves in case of injury during the tournament.

=== Norway ===
The following is the Norwegian roster in the men's ice hockey tournament of the 2010 Winter Olympics.

No.	Pos.	Name	Height	Weight	Birthdate	Birthplace	2009–10 team
33	G	Pål Grotnes	188 cm (6 ft 2 in)	86 kg (190 lb)	7 March 1977	Lørenskog	(Norway) Stjernen (GET)
34	G	André Lysenstøen	194 cm (6 ft 4 in)	112 kg (247 lb)	27 October 1988	Oslo	(Finland) HeKi (Mestis)
30	G	Ruben Smith	182 cm (6 ft 0 in)	75 kg (165 lb)	15 April 1984	Stavanger	(Norway) Storhamar Dragons (GET)
47	D	Alexander Bonsaksen	181 cm (5 ft 11 in)	83 kg (183 lb)	24 January 1987	Oslo	(Sweden) Modo (SEL)
6	D	Jonas Holøs	180 cm (5 ft 11 in)	88 kg (194 lb)	27 August 1987	Sarpsborg	(Sweden) Färjestad (SEL)
7	D	Tommy Jakobsen – C	173 cm (5 ft 8 in)	83 kg (183 lb)	10 December 1970	Oslo	(Norway) Lørenskog (GET)
5	D	Juha Kaunismäki	187 cm (6 ft 2 in)	88 kg (194 lb)	6 May 1979	Helsinki, Finland	(Norway) Stavanger Oilers (GET)
36	D	Lars Erik Lund	188 cm (6 ft 2 in)	95 kg (209 lb)	25 July 1974	Oslo	(Norway) Vålerenga (GET)
55	D	Ole-Kristian Tollefsen	188 cm (6 ft 2 in)	96 kg (212 lb)	29 March 1984	Oslo	(United States) Grand Rapids Griffins (AHL)
23	D	Mats Trygg – A	178 cm (5 ft 10 in)	82 kg (181 lb)	1 June 1976	Oslo	(Germany) Kölner Haie (DEL)
42	F	Jonas Solberg Andersen	184 cm (6 ft 0 in)	85 kg (187 lb)	8 March 1981	Sarpsborg	(Norway) Sparta Warriors (GET)
20	F	Anders Bastiansen	188 cm (6 ft 2 in)	97 kg (214 lb)	31 October 1980	Oslo	(Sweden) Färjestad (SEL)
26	F	Kristian Forsberg	183 cm (6 ft 0 in)	86 kg (190 lb)	5 May 1986	Oslo	(Sweden) Modo (SEL)
8	F	Mads Hansen – A	183 cm (6 ft 0 in)	90 kg (200 lb)	16 September 1978	Oslo	(Sweden) Brynäs (SEL)
9	F	Marius Holtet	183 cm (6 ft 0 in)	81 kg (179 lb)	31 August 1984	Hamar	(Sweden) Färjestad (SEL)
10	F	Lars Erik Spets	178 cm (5 ft 10 in)	82 kg (181 lb)	2 April 1985	Trondheim	(Norway) Vålerenga (GET)
46	F	Mathis Olimb	179 cm (5 ft 10 in)	79 kg (174 lb)	1 February 1986	Oslo	(Sweden) Frölunda (SEL)
22	F	Martin Røymark	184 cm (6 ft 0 in)	86 kg (190 lb)	10 November 1986	Oslo	(Sweden) Frölunda (SEL)
19	F	Per-Åge Skrøder	180 cm (5 ft 11 in)	92 kg (203 lb)	4 August 1978	Sarpsborg	(Sweden) Modo (SEL)
41	F	Patrick Thoresen	180 cm (5 ft 11 in)	85 kg (187 lb)	7 November 1983	Oslo	(Russia) Salavat Yulaev Ufa (KHL)
29	F	Tore Vikingstad	191 cm (6 ft 3 in)	93 kg (205 lb)	8 October 1975	Trondheim	(Germany) Hannover Scorpions (DEL)
35	F	Martin Laumann Ylven	190 cm (6 ft 3 in)	92 kg (203 lb)	22 December 1988	Oslo	(Sweden) Linköping (SEL)
48	F	Mats Zuccarello Aasen	170 cm (5 ft 7 in)	73 kg (161 lb)	1 September 1987	Oslo	(Sweden) Modo (SEL)

Forward Morten Ask was initially selected, but was injured and replaced by Jonas Solberg Andersen.

=== Switzerland ===
The following is the Swiss roster in the men's ice hockey tournament of the 2010 Winter Olympics.

No.	Pos.	Name	Height	Weight	Birthdate	Birthplace	2009–10 team
66	G	Ronnie Rüeger	186 cm (6 ft 1 in)	89 kg (196 lb)	26 February 1973	Bülach	(Switzerland) Kloten Flyers (NLA)
1	G	Jonas Hiller	188 cm (6 ft 2 in)	86 kg (190 lb)	12 February 1982	Felben-Wellhausen	(United States) Anaheim Ducks (NHL)
52	G	Tobias Stephan	188 cm (6 ft 2 in)	82 kg (181 lb)	21 January 1984	Zürich	(Switzerland) Genève-Servette (NLA)
5	D	Severin Blindenbacher	180 cm (5 ft 11 in)	88 kg (194 lb)	15 March 1983	Zürich	(Sweden) Färjestad (SEL)
16	D	Raphael Diaz	182 cm (6 ft 0 in)	88 kg (194 lb)	9 January 1986	Baar	(Switzerland) Zug (NLA)
54	D	Philippe Furrer	186 cm (6 ft 1 in)	90 kg (200 lb)	16 June 1985	Bern	(Switzerland) Bern (NLA)
72	D	Patrick von Gunten	180 cm (5 ft 11 in)	83 kg (183 lb)	10 February 1985	Biel	(Switzerland) Kloten Flyers (NLA)
47	D	Luca Sbisa	185 cm (6 ft 1 in)	80 kg (180 lb)	30 January 1990	Ozieri, Italy	(United States) Portland Winterhawks (WHL)
31	D	Mathias Seger – A	181 cm (5 ft 11 in)	84 kg (185 lb)	17 December 1977	Flawil	(Switzerland) ZSC Lions (NLA)
7	D	Mark Streit – C	183 cm (6 ft 0 in)	95 kg (209 lb)	11 December 1977	Englisberg	(United States) New York Islanders (NHL)
77	D	Yannick Weber	178 cm (5 ft 10 in)	88 kg (194 lb)	23 September 1988	Morges	(Canada) Hamilton Bulldogs (AHL)
10	F	Andres Ambühl	176 cm (5 ft 9 in)	85 kg (187 lb)	14 September 1983	Davos	(United States) Hartford Wolf Pack (AHL)
18	F	Thomas Déruns	186 cm (6 ft 1 in)	86 kg (190 lb)	1 March 1982	La Chaux-de-Fonds	(Switzerland) Genève-Servette (NLA)
17	F	Hnat Domenichelli	183 cm (6 ft 0 in)	82 kg (181 lb)	16 February 1976	Edmonton, Alberta, Canada	(Switzerland) Lugano (NLA)
35	F	Sandy Jeannin – A	180 cm (5 ft 11 in)	83 kg (183 lb)	28 February 1976	Les Bayards	(Switzerland) Fribourg-Gottéron (NLA)
67	F	Romano Lemm	182 cm (6 ft 0 in)	86 kg (190 lb)	25 June 1984	Dielsdorf	(Switzerland) Lugano (NLA)
25	F	Thibaut Monnet	183 cm (6 ft 0 in)	83 kg (183 lb)	2 February 1982	Martigny	(Switzerland) ZSC Lions (NLA)
23	F	Thierry Paterlini	184 cm (6 ft 0 in)	96 kg (212 lb)	27 April 1975	Chur	(Switzerland) Rapperswil-Jona Lakers (NLA)
28	F	Martin Plüss	174 cm (5 ft 9 in)	80 kg (180 lb)	5 April 1977	Murgenthal	(Switzerland) Bern (NLA)
32	F	Ivo Rüthemann	172 cm (5 ft 8 in)	76 kg (168 lb)	12 December 1976	Mosnang	(Switzerland) Bern (NLA)
39	F	Raffaele Sannitz	187 cm (6 ft 2 in)	93 kg (205 lb)	18 May 1983	Lugano	(Switzerland) Lugano (NLA)
86	F	Julien Sprunger	194 cm (6 ft 4 in)	87 kg (192 lb)	4 January 1986	Grolley	(Switzerland) Fribourg-Gottéron (NLA)
14	F	Roman Wick	187 cm (6 ft 2 in)	85 kg (187 lb)	30 December 1985	Zuzwil	(Switzerland) Kloten Flyers (NLA)

Goaltender Martin Gerber, defencemen Goran Bezina and Roman Josi, and forward Kevin Romy were initially selected, but could not play due to injury. They were replaced by Ronnie Rüeger, Philippe Furrer, Patrick von Gunten and Romano Lemm, respectively.

=== United States ===
The following is the American roster in the men's ice hockey tournament of the 2010 Winter Olympics.

No.	Pos.	Name	Height	Weight	Birthdate	Birthplace	2009–10 team
39	G	Ryan Miller	188 cm (6 ft 2 in)	75 kg (165 lb)	17 July 1980	East Lansing, MI	(United States) Buffalo Sabres (NHL)
29	G	Jonathan Quick	185 cm (6 ft 1 in)	91 kg (201 lb)	21 January 1986	Hamden, CT	(United States) Los Angeles Kings (NHL)
30	G	Tim Thomas	180 cm (5 ft 11 in)	91 kg (201 lb)	15 April 1974	Davison, MI	(United States) Boston Bruins (NHL)
4	D	Tim Gleason	183 cm (6 ft 0 in)	98 kg (216 lb)	29 January 1983	Clawson, MI	(United States) Carolina Hurricanes (NHL)
6	D	Erik Johnson	193 cm (6 ft 4 in)	107 kg (236 lb)	21 March 1988	Bloomington, MN	(United States) St. Louis Blues (NHL)
3	D	Jack Johnson	185 cm (6 ft 1 in)	102 kg (225 lb)	13 January 1987	Indianapolis, IN	(United States) Los Angeles Kings (NHL)
44	D	Brooks Orpik	188 cm (6 ft 2 in)	99 kg (218 lb)	26 September 1980	San Francisco, CA	(United States) Pittsburgh Penguins (NHL)
28	D	Brian Rafalski – A	178 cm (5 ft 10 in)	87 kg (192 lb)	28 September 1973	Dearborn, MI	(United States) Detroit Red Wings (NHL)
20	D	Ryan Suter – A	185 cm (6 ft 1 in)	88 kg (194 lb)	21 January 1985	Madison, WI	(United States) Nashville Predators (NHL)
19	D	Ryan Whitney	190 cm (6 ft 3 in)	95 kg (209 lb)	19 February 1983	Scituate, MA	(United States) Anaheim Ducks (NHL)
42	F	David Backes	191 cm (6 ft 3 in)	102 kg (225 lb)	1 May 1984	Blaine, MN	(United States) St. Louis Blues (NHL)
32	F	Dustin Brown – A	183 cm (6 ft 0 in)	94 kg (207 lb)	4 November 1984	Ithaca, NY	(United States) Los Angeles Kings (NHL)
24	F	Ryan Callahan	180 cm (5 ft 11 in)	84 kg (185 lb)	21 March 1985	Rochester, NY	(United States) New York Rangers (NHL)
23	F	Chris Drury	179 cm (5 ft 10 in)	86 kg (190 lb)	20 August 1976	Trumbull, CT	(United States) New York Rangers (NHL)
88	F	Patrick Kane	178 cm (5 ft 10 in)	81 kg (179 lb)	19 November 1988	Buffalo, NY	(United States) Chicago Blackhawks (NHL)
17	F	Ryan Kesler	188 cm (6 ft 2 in)	92 kg (203 lb)	31 August 1984	Livonia, MI	(Canada) Vancouver Canucks (NHL)
81	F	Phil Kessel	180 cm (5 ft 11 in)	82 kg (181 lb)	2 October 1987	Madison, WI	(Canada) Toronto Maple Leafs (NHL)
15	F	Jamie Langenbrunner – C	185 cm (6 ft 1 in)	91 kg (201 lb)	24 July 1975	Cloquet, MN	(United States) New Jersey Devils (NHL)
12	F	Ryan Malone	193 cm (6 ft 4 in)	102 kg (225 lb)	1 December 1979	Pittsburgh, PA	(United States) Tampa Bay Lightning (NHL)
9	F	Zach Parise – A	180 cm (5 ft 11 in)	86 kg (190 lb)	28 July 1984	Prior Lake, MN	(United States) New Jersey Devils (NHL)
16	F	Joe Pavelski	180 cm (5 ft 11 in)	88 kg (194 lb)	11 July 1984	Plover, WI	(United States) San Jose Sharks (NHL)
54	F	Bobby Ryan	188 cm (6 ft 2 in)	97 kg (214 lb)	17 March 1987	Cherry Hill, NJ	(United States) Anaheim Ducks (NHL)
26	F	Paul Stastny	183 cm (6 ft 0 in)	93 kg (205 lb)	27 December 1985	Quebec City, QC, Canada	(United States) Colorado Avalanche (NHL)

Defensemen Paul Martin and Mike Komisarek were initially selected, but due to injuries were replaced by Ryan Whitney and Tim Gleason.

== Group B ==
=== Czech Republic ===
The following is the Czech roster in the men's ice hockey tournament of the 2010 Winter Olympics.

No.	Pos.	Name	Height	Weight	Birthdate	Birthplace	2009–10 team
31	G	Ondřej Pavelec	188 cm (6 ft 2 in)	91 kg (201 lb)	31 August 1987	Kladno	(United States) Atlanta Thrashers (NHL)
33	G	Jakub Štěpánek	187 cm (6 ft 2 in)	71 kg (157 lb)	20 June 1986	Vsetín	(Czech Republic) Vítkovice (CZE)
29	G	Tomáš Vokoun	183 cm (6 ft 0 in)	88 kg (194 lb)	2 July 1976	Karlovy Vary	(United States) Florida Panthers (NHL)
44	D	Miroslav Blaťák	183 cm (6 ft 0 in)	79 kg (174 lb)	25 May 1982	Zlín	(Russia) Salavat Yulaev Ufa (KHL)
35	D	Jan Hejda	191 cm (6 ft 3 in)	95 kg (209 lb)	18 June 1978	Prague	(United States) Columbus Blue Jackets (NHL)
15	D	Tomáš Kaberle – A	185 cm (6 ft 1 in)	90 kg (200 lb)	2 March 1978	Rakovník	(Canada) Toronto Maple Leafs (NHL)
17	D	Filip Kuba	196 cm (6 ft 5 in)	103 kg (227 lb)	29 December 1976	Ostrava	(Canada) Ottawa Senators (NHL)
77	D	Pavel Kubina	193 cm (6 ft 4 in)	111 kg (245 lb)	15 April 1977	Čeladná	(United States) Atlanta Thrashers (NHL)
4	D	Zbyněk Michálek	185 cm (6 ft 1 in)	91 kg (201 lb)	23 December 1982	Jindřichův Hradec	(United States) Phoenix Coyotes (NHL)
5	D	Roman Polák	185 cm (6 ft 1 in)	103 kg (227 lb)	28 April 1986	Ostrava	(United States) St. Louis Blues (NHL)
3	D	Marek Židlický	180 cm (5 ft 11 in)	86 kg (190 lb)	3 February 1977	Most	(United States) Minnesota Wild (NHL)
16	RW	Petr Čajánek	180 cm (5 ft 11 in)	80 kg (180 lb)	18 August 1975	Zlín	(Russia) SKA Saint Petersburg (KHL)
10	C	Roman Červenka	181 cm (5 ft 11 in)	85 kg (187 lb)	10 December 1985	Prague	(Czech Republic) Slavia Prague (CZE)
26	LW	Patrik Eliáš – C	181 cm (5 ft 11 in)	88 kg (194 lb)	13 April 1976	Třebíč	(United States) New Jersey Devils (NHL)
91	RW	Martin Erat	183 cm (6 ft 0 in)	91 kg (201 lb)	12 August 1982	Třebíč	(United States) Nashville Predators (NHL)
34	LW	Tomáš Fleischmann	185 cm (6 ft 1 in)	87 kg (192 lb)	16 May 1984	Kopřivnice	(United States) Washington Capitals (NHL)
24	RW	Martin Havlát	188 cm (6 ft 2 in)	98 kg (216 lb)	19 April 1981	Mladá Boleslav	(United States) Minnesota Wild (NHL)
68	RW	Jaromír Jágr – A	191 cm (6 ft 3 in)	110 kg (240 lb)	15 February 1972	Kladno	(Russia) Avangard Omsk (KHL)
46	C	David Krejčí	183 cm (6 ft 0 in)	80 kg (180 lb)	28 April 1986	Šternberk	(United States) Boston Bruins (NHL)
9	LW	Milan Michálek	188 cm (6 ft 2 in)	102 kg (225 lb)	7 December 1984	Jindřichův Hradec	(Canada) Ottawa Senators (NHL)
14	C	Tomáš Plekanec	180 cm (5 ft 11 in)	90 kg (200 lb)	31 October 1982	Kladno	(Canada) Montreal Canadiens (NHL)
60	F	Tomáš Rolinek	175 cm (5 ft 9 in)	78 kg (172 lb)	17 February 1980	Žďár nad Sázavou	(Russia) Metallurg Magnitogorsk (KHL)
63	C	Josef Vašíček	193 cm (6 ft 4 in)	104 kg (229 lb)	12 September 1980	Havlíčkův Brod	(Russia) Lokomotiv Yaroslavl (KHL)

=== Latvia ===
The following is the Latvian roster in the men's ice hockey tournament of the 2010 Winter Olympics.

No.	Pos.	Name	Height	Weight	Birthdate	Birthplace	2009–10 team
31	G	Edgars Masaļskis	177 cm (5 ft 10 in)	75 kg (165 lb)	31 March 1980	Riga	(Latvia) Dinamo Riga (KHL)
1	G	Ervīns Muštukovs	184 cm (6 ft 0 in)	75 kg (165 lb)	7 April 1984	Riga	(Latvia) Dinamo-Juniors Riga (BLR)
30	G	Sergejs Naumovs	178 cm (5 ft 10 in)	78 kg (172 lb)	4 April 1969	Riga	(Latvia) Dinamo Riga (KHL)
8	D	Oskars Bārtulis	188 cm (6 ft 2 in)	92 kg (203 lb)	21 January 1987	Ogre	(United States) Philadelphia Flyers (NHL)
13	D	Guntis Galviņš	186 cm (6 ft 1 in)	87 kg (192 lb)	25 January 1986	Talsi	(Latvia) Dinamo Riga (KHL)
2	D	Rodrigo Laviņš	178 cm (5 ft 10 in)	85 kg (187 lb)	3 August 1974	Riga	(Latvia) Dinamo Riga (KHL)
71	D	Georgijs Pujacs	185 cm (6 ft 1 in)	95 kg (209 lb)	11 June 1981	Riga	(Russia) Sibir Novosibirsk (KHL)
26	D	Krišjānis Rēdlihs	189 cm (6 ft 2 in)	80 kg (180 lb)	15 January 1981	Riga	(Latvia) Dinamo Riga (KHL)
3	D	Arvīds Reķis	180 cm (5 ft 11 in)	90 kg (200 lb)	1 January 1979	Jūrmala	(Germany) Grizzly Adams Wolfsburg (DEL)
7	D	Kārlis Skrastiņš – C	188 cm (6 ft 2 in)	93 kg (205 lb)	9 July 1974	Riga	(United States) Dallas Stars (NHL)
11	D	Kristaps Sotnieks	180 cm (5 ft 11 in)	80 kg (180 lb)	29 January 1987	Riga	(Latvia) Dinamo Riga (KHL)
75	F	Ģirts Ankipāns	183 cm (6 ft 0 in)	83 kg (183 lb)	29 November 1975	Riga	(Latvia) Dinamo Riga (KHL)
21	F	Armands Bērziņš	192 cm (6 ft 4 in)	90 kg (200 lb)	27 December 1983	Riga	(Latvia) Dinamo Riga (KHL)
47	F	Mārtiņš Cipulis	180 cm (5 ft 11 in)	81 kg (179 lb)	29 November 1980	Cēsis	(Latvia) Dinamo Riga (KHL)
10	F	Lauris Dārziņš	190 cm (6 ft 3 in)	90 kg (200 lb)	28 January 1985	Riga	(Latvia) Dinamo Riga (KHL)
16	F	Kaspars Daugaviņš	183 cm (6 ft 0 in)	93 kg (205 lb)	18 May 1988	Riga	(United States) Binghamton Senators (AHL)
9	F	Mārtiņš Karsums	178 cm (5 ft 10 in)	90 kg (200 lb)	26 February 1986	Riga	(Latvia) Dinamo Riga (KHL)
87	F	Gints Meija	183 cm (6 ft 0 in)	80 kg (180 lb)	4 September 1987	Riga	(Latvia) Dinamo Riga (KHL)
17	F	Aleksandrs Ņiživijs – A	177 cm (5 ft 10 in)	77 kg (170 lb)	16 September 1976	Riga	(Latvia) Dinamo Riga (KHL)
24	F	Miķelis Rēdlihs	180 cm (5 ft 11 in)	80 kg (180 lb)	1 July 1984	Riga	(Latvia) Dinamo Riga (KHL)
88	F	Aleksejs Širokovs	182 cm (6 ft 0 in)	86 kg (190 lb)	20 February 1981	Riga	(Russia) Amur Khabarovsk (KHL)
5	F	Jānis Sprukts	190 cm (6 ft 3 in)	104 kg (229 lb)	31 January 1982	Riga	(Latvia) Dinamo Riga (KHL)
12	F	Herberts Vasiļjevs – A	181 cm (5 ft 11 in)	80 kg (180 lb)	23 May 1976	Riga	(Germany) Krefeld Pinguine (DEL)

=== Russia ===
The following is the Russian roster in the men's ice hockey tournament of the 2010 Winter Olympics.

No.	Pos.	Name	Height	Weight	Birthdate	Birthplace	2009–10 team
30	G	Ilya Bryzgalov	191 cm (6 ft 3 in)	90 kg (200 lb)	22 June 1980	Tolyatti	(United States) Phoenix Coyotes (NHL)
20	G	Evgeni Nabokov	183 cm (6 ft 0 in)	91 kg (201 lb)	25 July 1975	Ust-Kamenogorsk, Kazakh SSR	(United States) San Jose Sharks (NHL)
40	G	Semyon Varlamov	191 cm (6 ft 3 in)	96 kg (212 lb)	27 April 1988	Kuybyshev	(United States) Washington Capitals (NHL)
55	D	Sergei Gonchar	188 cm (6 ft 2 in)	98 kg (216 lb)	13 April 1974	Chelyabinsk	(United States) Pittsburgh Penguins (NHL)
37	D	Denis Grebeshkov	185 cm (6 ft 1 in)	88 kg (194 lb)	11 October 1983	Yaroslavl	(Canada) Edmonton Oilers (NHL)
7	D	Dmitri Kalinin	191 cm (6 ft 3 in)	93 kg (205 lb)	22 July 1980	Chelyabinsk	(Russia) Salavat Yulaev Ufa (KHL)
22	D	Konstantin Korneyev	180 cm (5 ft 11 in)	82 kg (181 lb)	5 June 1984	Moscow	(Russia) CSKA Moscow (KHL)
79	D	Andrei Markov	183 cm (6 ft 0 in)	92 kg (203 lb)	20 December 1978	Voskresensk	(Canada) Montreal Canadiens (NHL)
5	D	Ilya Nikulin	191 cm (6 ft 3 in)	100 kg (220 lb)	12 March 1982	Moscow	(Russia) Ak Bars Kazan (KHL)
51	D	Fedor Tyutin	188 cm (6 ft 2 in)	95 kg (209 lb)	19 July 1983	Izhevsk	(United States) Columbus Blue Jackets (NHL)
6	D	Anton Volchenkov	185 cm (6 ft 1 in)	107 kg (236 lb)	15 February 1982	Moscow	(Canada) Ottawa Senators (NHL)
61	RW	Maxim Afinogenov	183 cm (6 ft 0 in)	86 kg (190 lb)	4 September 1979	Moscow	(United States) Atlanta Thrashers (NHL)
13	C	Pavel Datsyuk	180 cm (5 ft 11 in)	88 kg (194 lb)	20 July 1978	Sverdlovsk	(United States) Detroit Red Wings (NHL)
29	C	Sergei Fedorov	188 cm (6 ft 2 in)	93 kg (205 lb)	13 December 1969	Pskov	(Russia) Metallurg Magnitogorsk (KHL)
71	LW	Ilya Kovalchuk – A	187 cm (6 ft 2 in)	107 kg (236 lb)	15 April 1983	Kalinin	(United States) New Jersey Devils (NHL)
52	RW	Viktor Kozlov	196 cm (6 ft 5 in)	107 kg (236 lb)	14 February 1975	Tolyatti	(Russia) Salavat Yulaev Ufa (KHL)
11	C	Evgeni Malkin	191 cm (6 ft 3 in)	88 kg (194 lb)	31 July 1986	Magnitogorsk	(United States) Pittsburgh Penguins (NHL)
95	RW	Aleksey Morozov – C	188 cm (6 ft 2 in)	89 kg (196 lb)	16 February 1977	Moscow	(Russia) Ak Bars Kazan (KHL)
8	LW	Alexander Ovechkin – A	188 cm (6 ft 2 in)	108 kg (238 lb)	17 September 1985	Moscow	(United States) Washington Capitals (NHL)
47	RW	Alexander Radulov	185 cm (6 ft 1 in)	85 kg (187 lb)	5 July 1986	Nizhny Tagil	(Russia) Salavat Yulaev Ufa (KHL)
28	LW	Alexander Semin	188 cm (6 ft 2 in)	93 kg (205 lb)	3 March 1984	Krasnoyarsk	(United States) Washington Capitals (NHL)
25	LW	Danis Zaripov	185 cm (6 ft 1 in)	84 kg (185 lb)	26 March 1981	Chelyabinsk	(Russia) Ak Bars Kazan (KHL)
42	C	Sergei Zinovjev	178 cm (5 ft 10 in)	81 kg (179 lb)	4 March 1980	Prokopyevsk	(Russia) Salavat Yulaev Ufa (KHL)

Defencemen Sergei Zubov, Oleg Tverdovsky and Vitali Proshkin, forwards Alexei Kovalev, Alexander Frolov, Nikolai Kulemin and Alexei Tereschenko, and goaltenders Vasiliy Koshechkin and Alexander Eremenko were selected as reserves in case of injury during the tournament.

=== Slovakia ===
The following is the Slovak roster in the men's ice hockey tournament of the 2010 Winter Olympics.

No.	Pos.	Name	Height	Weight	Birthdate	Birthplace	2009–10 team
31	G	Peter Budaj	185 cm (6 ft 1 in)	91 kg (201 lb)	18 September 1982	Banská Bystrica	(United States) Colorado Avalanche (NHL)
41	G	Jaroslav Halák	180 cm (5 ft 11 in)	82 kg (181 lb)	13 May 1985	Bratislava	(Canada) Montreal Canadiens (NHL)
35	G	Rastislav Staňa	185 cm (6 ft 1 in)	88 kg (194 lb)	10 January 1980	Košice	(Russia) Severstal (KHL)
7	D	Ivan Baranka	191 cm (6 ft 3 in)	91 kg (201 lb)	19 May 1985	Ilava	(Russia) Spartak Moscow (KHL)
33	D	Zdeno Chára – C	206 cm (6 ft 9 in)	116 kg (256 lb)	18 March 1977	Trenčín	(United States) Boston Bruins (NHL)
68	D	Milan Jurčina	193 cm (6 ft 4 in)	111 kg (245 lb)	7 June 1983	Liptovský Mikuláš	(United States) Columbus Blue Jackets (NHL)
14	D	Andrej Meszároš	188 cm (6 ft 2 in)	100 kg (220 lb)	13 October 1985	Považská Bystrica	(United States) Tampa Bay Lightning (NHL)
44	D	Andrej Sekera	183 cm (6 ft 0 in)	91 kg (201 lb)	8 June 1986	Bojnice	(United States) Buffalo Sabres (NHL)
77	D	Martin Štrbák	191 cm (6 ft 3 in)	96 kg (212 lb)	15 January 1975	Prešov	(Russia) HC MVD (KHL)
17	D	Ľubomír Višňovský	180 cm (5 ft 11 in)	84 kg (185 lb)	11 August 1976	Topoľčany	(Canada) Edmonton Oilers (NHL)
23	F	Ľuboš Bartečko	183 cm (6 ft 0 in)	86 kg (190 lb)	14 July 1976	Kežmarok	(Sweden) Färjestad (SEL)
8	F	Martin Cibák	185 cm (6 ft 1 in)	89 kg (196 lb)	17 May 1980	Liptovský Mikuláš	(Russia) Spartak Moscow (KHL)
38	F	Pavol Demitra – A	183 cm (6 ft 0 in)	91 kg (201 lb)	29 November 1974	Dubnica nad Váhom	(Canada) Vancouver Canucks (NHL)
10	F	Marián Gáborík	185 cm (6 ft 1 in)	90 kg (200 lb)	14 February 1982	Trenčín	(United States) New York Rangers (NHL)
26	F	Michal Handzuš	196 cm (6 ft 5 in)	98 kg (216 lb)	11 March 1977	Banská Bystrica	(United States) Los Angeles Kings (NHL)
91	F	Marcel Hossa	192 cm (6 ft 4 in)	100 kg (220 lb)	12 October 1981	Ilava	(Latvia) Dinamo Riga (KHL)
81	F	Marián Hossa – A	187 cm (6 ft 2 in)	95 kg (209 lb)	12 January 1979	Stará Ľubovňa	(United States) Chicago Blackhawks (NHL)
82	F	Tomáš Kopecký	191 cm (6 ft 3 in)	91 kg (201 lb)	5 February 1982	Ilava	(United States) Chicago Blackhawks (NHL)
24	F	Žigmund Pálffy	178 cm (5 ft 10 in)	82 kg (181 lb)	5 May 1972	Skalica	(Slovakia) HK 36 Skalica (SVK)
92	F	Branko Radivojevič	183 cm (6 ft 0 in)	94 kg (207 lb)	24 November 1980	Piešťany	(Russia) Spartak Moscow (KHL)
18	F	Miroslav Šatan	191 cm (6 ft 3 in)	87 kg (192 lb)	22 October 1974	Topoľčany	(United States) Boston Bruins (NHL)
15	F	Jozef Stümpel	191 cm (6 ft 3 in)	101 kg (223 lb)	20 July 1972	Nitra	(Kazakhstan) Barys Astana (KHL)
20	F	Richard Zedník	185 cm (6 ft 1 in)	91 kg (201 lb)	6 January 1976	Banská Bystrica	(Russia) Lokomotiv Yaroslavl (KHL)

Defenceman Richard Lintner was initially selected, but was replaced by Ivan Baranka.

== Group C ==
=== Belarus ===
The following is the Belarusian roster in the men's ice hockey tournament of the 2010 Winter Olympics.

No.	Pos.	Name	Height	Weight	Birthdate	Birthplace	2009–10 team
1	G	Vitali Koval	188 cm (6 ft 2 in)	100 kg (220 lb)	31 March 1980	Perm, Russian SFSR	(Belarus) Dynamo Minsk (KHL)
37	G	Maxim Malyutin	180 cm (5 ft 11 in)	74 kg (163 lb)	16 September 1988	Yaroslavl, Russian SFSR	(Belarus) Vitebsk (BLR)
31	G	Andrei Mezin	182 cm (6 ft 0 in)	78 kg (172 lb)	8 July 1974	Chelyabinsk, Russian SFSR	(Belarus) Dynamo Minsk (KHL)
7	D	Vladimir Denisov	181 cm (5 ft 11 in)	94 kg (207 lb)	29 June 1984	Navapolatsk	(Belarus) Dynamo Minsk (KHL)
33	D	Andrei Karev	180 cm (5 ft 11 in)	90 kg (200 lb)	12 February 1985	Elektrostal, Russian SFSR	(Belarus) Dynamo Minsk (KHL)
25	D	Sergei Kolosov	193 cm (6 ft 4 in)	92 kg (203 lb)	22 May 1986	Navapolatsk	(United States) Grand Rapids Griffins (AHL)
43	D	Viktor Kostiuchenok	187 cm (6 ft 2 in)	94 kg (207 lb)	7 June 1979	Minsk	(Russia) Spartak Moscow (KHL)
4	D	Alexander Makritski	186 cm (6 ft 1 in)	90 kg (200 lb)	11 August 1971	Minsk	(Belarus) Dynamo Minsk (KHL)
52	D	Alexander Ryadinsky	189 cm (6 ft 2 in)	93 kg (205 lb)	1 April 1978	Minsk	(Belarus) Dynamo Minsk (KHL)
24	D	Ruslan Salei – C	184 cm (6 ft 0 in)	96 kg (212 lb)	2 November 1974	Minsk	(United States) Colorado Avalanche (NHL)
5	D	Nikolai Stasenko	195 cm (6 ft 5 in)	101 kg (223 lb)	15 February 1987	Roshchino, Russian SFSR	(Russia) Amur Khabarovsk (KHL)
10	F	Oleg Antonenko – A	187 cm (6 ft 2 in)	92 kg (203 lb)	1 July 1971	Minsk	(Belarus) Dynamo Minsk (KHL)
59	F	Sergei Demagin	183 cm (6 ft 0 in)	79 kg (174 lb)	19 July 1986	Minsk	(Russia) Neftekhimik Nizhnekamsk (KHL)
71	F	Alexei Kalyuzhny	178 cm (5 ft 10 in)	84 kg (185 lb)	13 June 1977	Minsk	(Russia) Dynamo Moscow (KHL)
28	F	Konstantin Koltsov – A	186 cm (6 ft 1 in)	90 kg (200 lb)	17 April 1981	Minsk	(Russia) Salavat Yulaev Ufa (KHL)
74	F	Sergei Kostitsyn	180 cm (5 ft 11 in)	93 kg (205 lb)	20 March 1987	Navapolatsk	(Canada) Montreal Canadiens (NHL)
11	F	Alexander Kulakov	182 cm (6 ft 0 in)	89 kg (196 lb)	15 May 1983	Minsk	(Belarus) Dynamo Minsk (KHL)
19	F	Dmitri Meleshko	181 cm (5 ft 11 in)	81 kg (179 lb)	8 November 1982	Minsk	(Belarus) Dynamo Minsk (KHL)
8	F	Andrei Mikhalev	185 cm (6 ft 1 in)	90 kg (200 lb)	23 February 1978	Minsk	(Belarus) Dynamo Minsk (KHL)
26	F	Andrei Stas	187 cm (6 ft 2 in)	83 kg (183 lb)	18 October 1988	Minsk	(Belarus) Dynamo Minsk (KHL)
18	F	Alexei Ugarov	179 cm (5 ft 10 in)	80 kg (180 lb)	2 January 1985	Minsk	(Russia) HC MVD (KHL)
22	F	Sergei Zadelenov	178 cm (5 ft 10 in)	88 kg (194 lb)	27 February 1976	Navapolatsk	(Belarus) Dynamo Minsk (KHL)
21	F	Konstantin Zakharov	186 cm (6 ft 1 in)	93 kg (205 lb)	2 May 1985	Minsk	(Belarus) Dynamo Minsk (KHL)

Defencemen Andrei Antonov, Andrei Bashko, Vadim Sushko and Aleksandr Syrei, along with forwards Mikhail Grabovski and Andrei Kostitsyn, were initially selected but could not play due to injuries. The players chosen to replace them were defencemen Andrei Karev, Sergei Kolosov, Alexander Makritski and Alexander Ryadinsky, and forwards Dmitri Meleshko and Konstantin Zakharov.

=== Finland ===
The following is the Finnish roster in the men's ice hockey tournament of the 2010 Winter Olympics.

No.	Pos.	Name	Height	Weight	Birthdate	Birthplace	2009–10 team
33	G	Niklas Bäckström	185 cm (6 ft 1 in)	89 kg (196 lb)	13 February 1978	Helsinki	(United States) Minnesota Wild (NHL)
34	G	Miikka Kiprusoff	188 cm (6 ft 2 in)	85 kg (187 lb)	26 October 1976	Turku	(Canada) Calgary Flames (NHL)
30	G	Antero Niittymäki	185 cm (6 ft 1 in)	84 kg (185 lb)	18 June 1980	Turku	(United States) Tampa Bay Lightning (NHL)
5	D	Lasse Kukkonen	183 cm (6 ft 0 in)	85 kg (187 lb)	18 September 1981	Oulu	(Russia) Avangard Omsk (KHL)
18	D	Sami Lepistö	183 cm (6 ft 0 in)	80 kg (180 lb)	17 October 1984	Espoo	(United States) Phoenix Coyotes (NHL)
32	D	Toni Lydman	185 cm (6 ft 1 in)	92 kg (203 lb)	25 September 1977	Lahti	(United States) Buffalo Sabres (NHL)
21	D	Janne Niskala	184 cm (6 ft 0 in)	85 kg (187 lb)	22 September 1981	Västerås, Sweden	(Sweden) Frölunda Indians (SEL)
25	D	Joni Pitkänen	191 cm (6 ft 3 in)	97 kg (214 lb)	19 September 1983	Oulu	(United States) Carolina Hurricanes (NHL)
6	D	Sami Salo	191 cm (6 ft 3 in)	93 kg (205 lb)	2 September 1974	Turku	(Canada) Vancouver Canucks (NHL)
44	D	Kimmo Timonen – A	178 cm (5 ft 10 in)	88 kg (194 lb)	18 March 1975	Kuopio	(United States) Philadelphia Flyers (NHL)
51	F	Valtteri Filppula	183 cm (6 ft 0 in)	88 kg (194 lb)	20 March 1984	Vantaa	(United States) Detroit Red Wings (NHL)
10	F	Niklas Hagman	183 cm (6 ft 0 in)	93 kg (205 lb)	5 December 1979	Helsinki	(Canada) Calgary Flames (NHL)
62	F	Jarkko Immonen	183 cm (6 ft 0 in)	95 kg (209 lb)	19 April 1982	Rantasalmi	(Russia) Ak Bars Kazan (KHL)
12	F	Olli Jokinen	191 cm (6 ft 3 in)	98 kg (216 lb)	5 December 1978	Kuopio	(United States) New York Rangers (NHL)
39	F	Niko Kapanen	175 cm (5 ft 9 in)	82 kg (181 lb)	29 April 1978	Hattula	(Russia) Ak Bars Kazan (KHL)
9	F	Mikko Koivu	188 cm (6 ft 2 in)	91 kg (201 lb)	12 March 1983	Turku	(United States) Minnesota Wild (NHL)
11	F	Saku Koivu – C	178 cm (5 ft 10 in)	83 kg (183 lb)	23 November 1974	Turku	(United States) Anaheim Ducks (NHL)
26	F	Jere Lehtinen	183 cm (6 ft 0 in)	87 kg (192 lb)	24 June 1973	Espoo	(United States) Dallas Stars (NHL)
20	F	Antti Miettinen	183 cm (6 ft 0 in)	86 kg (190 lb)	3 July 1980	Hämeenlinna	(United States) Minnesota Wild (NHL)
16	F	Ville Peltonen	178 cm (5 ft 10 in)	83 kg (183 lb)	24 May 1973	Vantaa	(Belarus) Dynamo Minsk (KHL)
37	F	Jarkko Ruutu	185 cm (6 ft 1 in)	93 kg (205 lb)	23 August 1975	Vantaa	(Canada) Ottawa Senators (NHL)
15	F	Tuomo Ruutu	185 cm (6 ft 1 in)	96 kg (212 lb)	16 February 1983	Vantaa	(United States) Carolina Hurricanes (NHL)
8	F	Teemu Selänne – A	183 cm (6 ft 0 in)	93 kg (205 lb)	3 July 1970	Helsinki	(United States) Anaheim Ducks (NHL)

=== Germany ===
The following is the German roster in the men's ice hockey tournament of the 2010 Winter Olympics.

No.	Pos.	Name	Height	Weight	Birthdate	Birthplace	2009–10 team
44	G	Dennis Endras	182 cm (6 ft 0 in)	72 kg (159 lb)	14 July 1985	Immenstadt	(Germany) Augsburger Panther (DEL)
1	G	Thomas Greiss	185 cm (6 ft 1 in)	86 kg (190 lb)	26 January 1986	Füssen	(United States) San Jose Sharks (NHL)
32	G	Dimitri Pätzold	193 cm (6 ft 4 in)	99 kg (218 lb)	3 February 1983	Ust-Kamenogorsk, Kazakh SSR	(Germany) ERC Ingolstadt (DEL)
22	D	Michael Bakos	190 cm (6 ft 3 in)	90 kg (200 lb)	2 March 1979	Augsburg	(Germany) ERC Ingolstadt (DEL)
6	D	Sven Butenschön	192 cm (6 ft 4 in)	96 kg (212 lb)	22 March 1976	Itzehoe	(Germany) Adler Mannheim (DEL)
10	D	Christian Ehrhoff	188 cm (6 ft 2 in)	90 kg (200 lb)	6 July 1982	Moers	(Canada) Vancouver Canucks (NHL)
38	D	Jakub Ficenec	179 cm (5 ft 10 in)	89 kg (196 lb)	11 February 1977	Hradec Králové, Czechoslovakia	(Germany) ERC Ingolstadt (DEL)
5	D	Korbinian Holzer	190 cm (6 ft 3 in)	93 kg (205 lb)	16 February 1988	Munich	(Germany) DEG Metro Stars (DEL)
7	D	Chris Schmidt	189 cm (6 ft 2 in)	91 kg (201 lb)	1 March 1976	Beaverlodge, Alberta, Canada	(Germany) Adler Mannheim (DEL)
84	D	Dennis Seidenberg – A	193 cm (6 ft 4 in)	95 kg (209 lb)	18 July 1981	Villingen-Schwenningen	(United States) Florida Panthers (NHL)
52	D	Alexander Sulzer	185 cm (6 ft 1 in)	94 kg (207 lb)	30 May 1984	Kaufbeuren	(United States) Nashville Predators (NHL)
11	F	Sven Felski – A	180 cm (5 ft 11 in)	76 kg (168 lb)	18 November 1974	Berlin	(Germany) Eisbären Berlin (DEL)
57	F	Marcel Goc	185 cm (6 ft 1 in)	92 kg (203 lb)	24 August 1983	Calw	(United States) Nashville Predators (NHL)
39	F	Thomas Greilinger	180 cm (5 ft 11 in)	110 kg (240 lb)	6 August 1981	Deggendorf	(Germany) ERC Ingolstadt (DEL)
17	F	Jochen Hecht	185 cm (6 ft 1 in)	90 kg (200 lb)	21 June 1977	Mannheim	(United States) Buffalo Sabres (NHL)
18	F	Kai Hospelt	185 cm (6 ft 1 in)	85 kg (187 lb)	23 August 1985	Cologne	(Germany) Grizzly Adams Wolfsburg (DEL)
9	F	Manuel Klinge	180 cm (5 ft 11 in)	80 kg (180 lb)	5 September 1984	Kassel	(Germany) Kassel Huskies (DEL)
25	F	Marcel Müller	193 cm (6 ft 4 in)	104 kg (229 lb)	10 July 1988	Berlin	(Germany) Kölner Haie (DEL)
15	F	T. J. Mulock	183 cm (6 ft 0 in)	88 kg (194 lb)	26 February 1985	Langley, British Columbia, Canada	(Germany) Eisbären Berlin (DEL)
24	F	André Rankel	186 cm (6 ft 1 in)	89 kg (196 lb)	27 August 1985	Berlin	(Germany) Eisbären Berlin (DEL)
19	F	Marco Sturm – C	181 cm (5 ft 11 in)	88 kg (194 lb)	8 September 1978	Dingolfing	(United States) Boston Bruins (NHL)
21	F	John Tripp	191 cm (6 ft 3 in)	104 kg (229 lb)	4 May 1977	Kingston, Ontario, Canada	(Germany) Hamburg Freezers (DEL)
16	F	Michael Wolf	178 cm (5 ft 10 in)	75 kg (165 lb)	24 January 1981	Ehenbichl, Austria	(Germany) Iserlohn Roosters (DEL)

Defenceman Jason Holland was replaced by Sven Butenschön, and forwards Alexander Barta and Philip Gogulla were replaced by Kai Hospelt and Jochen Hecht, respectively.

=== Sweden ===
The following is the Swedish roster in the men's ice hockey tournament of the 2010 Winter Olympics.

No.	Pos.	Name	Height	Weight	Birthdate	Birthplace	2009–10 team
50	G	Jonas Gustavsson	191 cm (6 ft 3 in)	87 kg (192 lb)	24 October 1984	Danderyd	(Canada) Toronto Maple Leafs (NHL)
1	G	Stefan Liv	183 cm (6 ft 0 in)	80 kg (180 lb)	21 December 1980	Gdynia, Poland	(Sweden) HV71 (SEL)
30	G	Henrik Lundqvist	185 cm (6 ft 1 in)	88 kg (194 lb)	2 March 1982	Åre	(United States) New York Rangers (NHL)
39	D	Tobias Enström	178 cm (5 ft 10 in)	79 kg (174 lb)	5 November 1984	Nordingrå	(United States) Atlanta Thrashers (NHL)
6	D	Magnus Johansson	178 cm (5 ft 10 in)	82 kg (181 lb)	4 September 1973	Linköping	(Sweden) Linköping (SEL)
55	D	Niklas Kronwall	183 cm (6 ft 0 in)	86 kg (190 lb)	12 January 1981	Stockholm	(United States) Detroit Red Wings (NHL)
5	D	Nicklas Lidström – C	188 cm (6 ft 2 in)	86 kg (190 lb)	28 April 1970	Avesta	(United States) Detroit Red Wings (NHL)
3	D	Douglas Murray	191 cm (6 ft 3 in)	109 kg (240 lb)	12 March 1980	Bromma	(United States) San Jose Sharks (NHL)
29	D	Johnny Oduya	183 cm (6 ft 0 in)	91 kg (201 lb)	1 October 1981	Stockholm	(United States) Atlanta Thrashers (NHL)
10	D	Henrik Tallinder	191 cm (6 ft 3 in)	98 kg (216 lb)	10 January 1979	Stockholm	(United States) Buffalo Sabres (NHL)
2	D	Mattias Öhlund	191 cm (6 ft 3 in)	100 kg (220 lb)	9 September 1976	Piteå	(United States) Tampa Bay Lightning (NHL)
11	F	Daniel Alfredsson – A	180 cm (5 ft 11 in)	93 kg (205 lb)	11 December 1972	Gothenburg	(Canada) Ottawa Senators (NHL)
19	F	Nicklas Bäckström	185 cm (6 ft 1 in)	95 kg (209 lb)	23 November 1987	Gävle	(United States) Washington Capitals (NHL)
91	F	Loui Eriksson	185 cm (6 ft 1 in)	83 kg (183 lb)	17 July 1985	Gothenburg	(United States) Dallas Stars (NHL)
21	F	Peter Forsberg	183 cm (6 ft 0 in)	95 kg (209 lb)	20 July 1973	Örnsköldsvik	(Sweden) Modo (SEL)
93	F	Johan Franzén	191 cm (6 ft 3 in)	100 kg (220 lb)	23 December 1979	Vetlanda	(United States) Detroit Red Wings (NHL)
27	F	Patric Hörnqvist	180 cm (5 ft 11 in)	85 kg (187 lb)	1 January 1987	Sollentuna	(United States) Nashville Predators (NHL)
33	F	Fredrik Modin	193 cm (6 ft 4 in)	101 kg (223 lb)	8 October 1974	Sundsvall	(United States) Columbus Blue Jackets (NHL)
26	F	Samuel Påhlsson	183 cm (6 ft 0 in)	96 kg (212 lb)	17 December 1977	Ånge	(United States) Columbus Blue Jackets (NHL)
22	F	Daniel Sedin	185 cm (6 ft 1 in)	83 kg (183 lb)	26 September 1980	Örnsköldsvik	(Canada) Vancouver Canucks (NHL)
20	F	Henrik Sedin	188 cm (6 ft 2 in)	83 kg (183 lb)	26 September 1980	Örnsköldsvik	(Canada) Vancouver Canucks (NHL)
80	F	Mattias Weinhandl	182 cm (6 ft 0 in)	85 kg (187 lb)	1 June 1980	Ljungby	(Russia) Dynamo Moscow (KHL)
40	F	Henrik Zetterberg – A	180 cm (5 ft 11 in)	88 kg (194 lb)	9 October 1980	Njurunda	(United States) Detroit Red Wings (NHL)

Forward Tomas Holmström was selected, but due to a knee injury he was replaced by Johan Franzén.

== See also ==
- Ice hockey at the 2010 Winter Olympics – Women's team rosters
