= Ice hockey at the 2010 Winter Olympics – Men's tournament =

2010 Winter Olympics
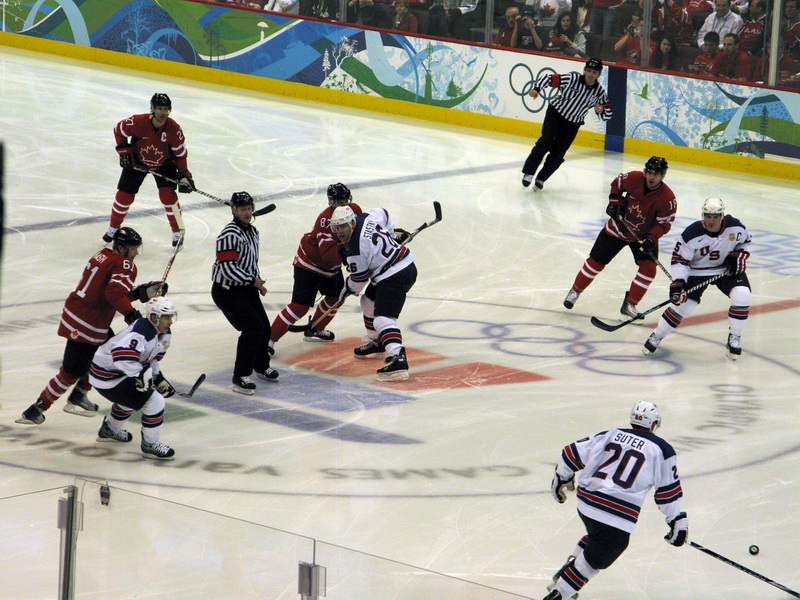
- A round-robin game between the USA and Canada

Tournament details
- Host country: Canada
- Venue(s): Canada Hockey Place; UBC Thunderbird Arena
- Dates: February 16–28
- Teams: 12

Final positions
- Champions: Canada (8th title)
- Runners-up: United States
- Third place: Finland
- Fourth place: Slovakia

Tournament statistics
- Games played: 30
- Goals scored: 180 (6 per game)
- Attendance: 491,444 (16,381 per game)
- Scoring leader: Pavol Demitra (10 points)

Awards
- MVP: Ryan Miller

The men's tournament in ice hockey at the 2010 Winter Olympics was held in Vancouver, British Columbia, Canada, from February 16 to February 28, 2010. Games were hosted at two venues – Canada Hockey Place (renamed from "General Motors Place" for the Olympics because IOC rules disallowed host venues to be named after non-Olympic sponsors) and UBC Thunderbird Arena. These Olympics were the first to take place in a city with a National Hockey League team since the NHL players were introduced in 1998, which meant players on the Vancouver Canucks who were competing in the Olympics were playing in their home arena: Roberto Luongo for Canada, Ryan Kesler for the United States, Pavol Demitra for Slovakia, Sami Salo for Finland, Christian Ehrhoff for Germany, and Daniel and Henrik Sedin for Sweden.

Teams from twelve national hockey associations competed, seeded into three groups for the preliminary round. The tournament consisted of 30 games: 18 in the preliminary round (teams played the other teams in their own group); 4 qualification playoff games; 4 quarterfinal games; 2 semifinal games; 1 bronze medal game; and 1 gold medal game.

During the tournament, Teemu Selänne of Finland became the all-time leader for points scored in the Olympics. He notched an assist in his second game of the tournament for 37 career points, surpassing Valeri Kharlamov of the Soviet Union, Vlastimil Bubník of Czechoslovakia, and Harry Watson of Canada. Sweden's goaltender Henrik Lundqvist set a modern-day Olympic shutout streak record of 172 minutes and 34 seconds, continuous from the final of the gold medal game of the 2006 Olympics until Sweden's quarterfinal against Slovakia.

The tournament was won by Canada for the record eighth time, who defeated the United States in overtime in the gold medal game. Finland won the bronze medal over Slovakia.

== Qualification ==
Belarus, Canada, Czech Republic, Finland, Russia, Slovakia, Sweden, Switzerland and the United States qualified as the top nine teams in the IIHF World Ranking. Germany, Latvia and Norway qualified via the qualification tournament for teams ranked 10th through 30th.

== Rosters ==
Group A	Group B	Group C
Canada (roster); Norway (roster); Switzerland (roster); United States (roster)	Czech Republic (roster); Latvia (roster); Russia (roster); Slovakia (roster)	Belarus (roster); Finland (roster); Germany (roster); Sweden (roster)

== Preliminary round ==
Points to each team were awarded as follows:

- 3 points for a win at the conclusion of regulation time
- 2 points for an overtime or shootout win
- 1 point for an overtime or shootout loss
- 0 points for a loss at the conclusion of regulation

If two or more teams were tied in points, the following tiebreaker criteria were used:

- points earned in games involving only tied teams
- goal difference in games involving only tied teams
- goals scored in games involving only tied teams
- goal difference in all group games
- goals scored in all group games
- better 2009 IIHF World Ranking position

If a criterion left only two teams tied, then those teams were ranked based on their head-to-head result.

=== Group A ===
Team	Pld	W	OTW	OTL	L	GF	GA	GD	Pts	Qualification
United States	3	3	0	0	0	14	5	+9	9	Quarterfinals
Canada	3	1	1	0	1	14	7	+7	5	
Switzerland	3	0	1	1	1	8	10	−2	3	
Norway	3	0	0	1	2	5	19	−14	1	

Source: IIHF

All times are local (UTC−08:00).

16 February 2010; 12:00	United States	3–1 (1–0, 2–0, 0–1)	Switzerland	Canada Hockey Place, Vancouver; Attendance: 16,706

Game reference

Ryan Miller
Goalies
Jonas Hiller
Referees:
(Russia) Vyacheslav Bulanov
(Canada) Dan O'Halloran
Linesmen:
(Canada) Jean Morin
(Russia) Yuri Oskirko

B. Ryan – 18:59	1–0
D. Backes – 25:52	2–0
R. Malone (R. Suter) (PP) – 28:25	3–0
	3–1	49:45 – R. Wick (H. Domenichelli, M. Streit) (PP)

4 min
Penalties
6 min
24
Shots
15

16 February 2010; 16:30	Canada	8–0 (0–0, 3–0, 5–0)	Norway	Canada Hockey Place, Vancouver; Attendance: 16,652

Game reference

Roberto Luongo
Goalies
Pål Grotnes (out 44:29) / André Lysenstøen (in 44:29)
Referees:
(Finland) Jyri Rönn
(United States) Chris Rooney
Linesmen:
(Finland) Stefan Fonselius
(United States) Tim Nowak

J. Iginla (S. Crosby, D. Doughty) (PP) – 22:30	1–0
D. Heatley (C. Pronger, J. Thornton) – 24:27	2–0
M. Richards (P. Bergeron, S. Weber) – 31:06	3–0
R. Getzlaf (S. Niedermayer, J. Toews) – 44:29	4–0
D. Heatley (P. Marleau, D. Boyle) (PP) – 46:43	5–0
J. Iginla (R. Nash, S. Crosby) – 47:36	6–0
C. Perry (E. Staal, D. Boyle) – 51:03	7–0
J. Iginla (R. Nash, S. Crosby) – 58:11	8–0

10 min
Penalties
12 min
42
Shots
15

18 February 2010; 12:00	United States	6–1 (2–0, 1–1, 3–0)	Norway	Canada Hockey Place, Vancouver; Attendance: 16,710

Game reference

Ryan Miller
Goalies
Pål Grotnes
Referees:
(Canada) Marc Joannette
(Canada) Guy Pellerin
Linesmen:
(Czech Republic) Petr Blümel
(Canada) Jean Morin

P. Kessel (J. Pavelski, R. Malone) – 2:39	1–0
C. Drury (R. Callahan, D. Backes) – 13:04	2–0
P. Kane (Z. Parise) – 25:52	3–0
	3–1	28:37 – M. Holtet (SH)
R. Malone (J. Johnson, R. Miller) – 54:19	4–1
B. Rafalski (Z. Parise, P. Kessel) (PP) – 57:00	5–1
B. Rafalski (R. Suter, J. Pavelski) – 59:23	6–1

4 min
Penalties
10 min
39
Shots
11

18 February 2010; 16:30	Switzerland	2–3 (SO) (0–1, 2–1, 0–0, 0–0, 0–1)	Canada	Canada Hockey Place, Vancouver; Attendance: 17,019

Game reference

Jonas Hiller
Goalies
Martin Brodeur
Referees:
(United States) Dennis LaRue
(Sweden) Marcus Vinnerborg
Linesmen:
(United States) Peter Feola
(United States) Tim Nowak

	0–1	9:21 – D. Heatley (P. Marleau, J. Toews)
	0–2	20:35 – P. Marleau (D. Heatley, S. Weber) (PP)
I. Rüthemann (M. Plüss, T. Paterlini) – 28:59	1–2
P. von Gunten (T. Monnet, P. Furrer) – 39:50	2–2

H. Domenichelli (miss)
R. Lemm (miss)
R. Wick (miss)
M. Plüss (miss)
Shootout
(miss) S. Crosby
(miss) J. Toews
(miss) R. Getzlaf
S. Crosby
14 min
Penalties
2 min
23
Shots
47

20 February 2010; 12:00	Norway	4–5 (OT) (1–1, 2–2, 1–1, 0–1)	Switzerland	Canada Hockey Place, Vancouver; Attendance: 16,952

Game reference

Pål Grotnes
Goalies
Jonas Hiller
Referees:
(Canada) Paul Devorski
(Slovakia) Peter Ország
Linesmen:
(Slovakia) Milan Novak
(Germany) Felix Winnekens

	0–1	1:03 – J. Sprunger (H. Domenichelli, R. Sannitz)
T. Vikingstad (P. Thoresen, T. Jakobsen) – 12:21	1–1
M. Hansen (P. Thoresen) (PP) – 25:24	2–1
	2–2	29:15 – R. Wick (M. Seger, M. Plüss)
	2–3	35:42 – R. Sannitz (M. Seger, R. Wick)
T. Vikingstad (M. Zuccarello, M. Olimb) – 38:46	3–3
	3–4	49:56 – S. Blindenbacher (R. Wick, M. Streit) (PP)
T. Vikingstad (P. Thoresen) – 52:18	4–4
	4–5	62:28 – R. Lemm (S. Jeannin)

4 min
Penalties
10 min
23
Shots
38

21 February 2010; 16:40	Canada	3–5 (1–2, 1–1, 1–2)	United States	Canada Hockey Place, Vancouver; Attendance: 16,910

Game reference

Martin Brodeur
Goalies
Ryan Miller
Referees:
(United States) Chris Rooney
(Canada) Brad Watson
Linesmen:
(United States) Thor Nelson
(Canada) Jay Sharrers

	0–1	0:41 – B. Rafalski (R. Suter, J. Langenbrunner)
E. Staal (B. Seabrook, J. Toews) – 8:53	1–1
	1–2	9:15 – B. Rafalski
D. Heatley (J. Toews, S. Weber) – 23:32	2–2
	2–3	36:46 – C. Drury (B. Ryan, D. Backes)
	2–4	47:09 – J. Langenbrunner (B. Rafalski, R. Suter) (PP)
S. Crosby (R. Nash, D. Keith) (PP) – 56:51	3–4
	3–5	59:15 – R. Kesler (Z. Parise) (EN)

8 min
Penalties
6 min
45
Shots
23

=== Group B ===
Team	Pld	W	OTW	OTL	L	GF	GA	GD	Pts	Qualification
Russia	3	2	0	1	0	13	6	+7	7	Quarterfinals
Czech Republic	3	2	0	0	1	10	7	+3	6	
Slovakia	3	1	1	0	1	9	4	+5	5	
Latvia	3	0	0	0	3	4	19	−15	0	

Source: IIHF

All times are local (UTC−08:00).

16 February 2010; 21:00	Russia	8–2 (3–0, 1–0, 4–2)	Latvia	Canada Hockey Place, Vancouver; Attendance: 16,862

Game reference

Evgeni Nabokov
Goalies
Edgars Masaļskis
Referees:
(United States) Dennis LaRue
(Sweden) Marcus Vinnerborg
Linesmen:
(United States) Peter Feola
(Canada) Jay Sharrers

D. Zaripov (S. Fedorov, I. Nikulin) – 2:38	1–0
A. Radulov (S. Fedorov, D. Kalinin) – 7:46	2–0
A. Ovechkin (A. Semin) – 19:25	3–0
E. Malkin (M. Afinogenov, I. Kovalchuk) (PP) – 38:18	4–0
	4–1	40:33 – H. Vasiļjevs (A. Ņiživijs, M. Cipulis)
A. Ovechkin (P. Datsyuk) – 40:59	5–1
D. Zaripov (S. Zinovyev) – 41:30	6–1
I. Kovalchuk (E. Malkin, F. Tyutin) – 43:04	7–1
	7–2	43:35 – Ģ. Ankipāns (J. Sprukts, M. Karsums)
A. Morozov (A. Markov) – 58:57	8–2

10 min
Penalties
16 min
45
Shots
20

17 February 2010; 21:00	Czech Republic	3–1 (1–0, 2–1, 0–0)	Slovakia	Canada Hockey Place, Vancouver; Attendance: 16,924

Game reference

Tomáš Vokoun
Goalies
Jaroslav Halák
Referees:
(Switzerland) Brent Reiber
(Canada) Brad Watson
Linesmen:
(United States) Shane Heyer
(Canada) Sylvain Losier

P. Eliáš (M. Havlát, M. Blaťák) – 9:02	1–0
	1–1	20:47 – M. Gáborík (Mari. Hossa, P. Demitra)
J. Jágr (R. Červenka) – 37:56	2–1
T. Plekanec (J. Jágr, M. Židlický) – 39:58	3–1

8 min
Penalties
12 min
24
Shots
35

18 February 2010; 21:00	Slovakia	2–1 (SO) (0–0, 0–1, 1–0, 0–0, 1–0)	Russia	Canada Hockey Place, Vancouver; Attendance: 17,202

Game reference
Jaroslav Halák	Goalies	Ilya Bryzgalov	Referees: (Switzerland) Danny Kurmann (Canada) Bill McCreary; Linesmen: (Canada) Jay Sharrers (Germany) Felix Winnekens
/ 0–1 / 25:32 – A. Morozov (A. Markov, S. Zinovyev); Mari. Hossa (Demitra, Marc. Hossa) – 49:48 / 1–1			Referees: (Switzerland) Danny Kurmann (Canada) Bill McCreary; Linesmen: (Canada) Jay Sharrers (Germany) Felix Winnekens
J. Stümpel; P. Demitra (miss); Mari. Hossa (miss); J. Stümpel (miss); M. Handzuš (miss); M. Gáborík (miss); P. Demitra	Shootout	(miss) A. Morozov; A. Ovechkin; (miss) P. Datsyuk; (miss) A. Ovechkin; (miss) I. Kovalchuk; (miss) A. Ovechkin; (miss) E. Malkin	Referees: (Switzerland) Danny Kurmann (Canada) Bill McCreary; Linesmen: (Canada) Jay Sharrers (Germany) Felix Winnekens
10 min	Penalties	6 min	Referees: (Switzerland) Danny Kurmann (Canada) Bill McCreary; Linesmen: (Canada) Jay Sharrers (Germany) Felix Winnekens
32	Shots	37	Referees: (Switzerland) Danny Kurmann (Canada) Bill McCreary; Linesmen: (Canada) Jay Sharrers (Germany) Felix Winnekens

19 February 2010; 16:30	Czech Republic	5–2 (3–0, 1–2, 1–0)	Latvia	Canada Hockey Place, Vancouver; Attendance: 16,984

Game reference

Tomáš Vokoun
Goalies
Edgars Masaļskis
Referees:
(Finland) Jyri Rönn
(United States) Chris Rooney
Linesmen:
(Finland) Stefan Fonselius
(United States) Thor Nelson

D. Krejčí (M. Erat, T. Fleischmann) – 2:30	1–0
M. Michálek (M. Židlický, T. Plekanec) – 3:33	2–0
J. Jágr (M. Židlický, T. Kaberle) (PP) – 5:07	3–0
T. Kaberle (P. Eliáš, M. Židlický) (PP) – 26:33	4–0
	4–1	35:30 – K. Sotnieks (H. Vasiļjevs)
	4–2	38:26 – Ģ. Ankipāns (M. Karsums, G. Pujacs) (PP)
P. Eliáš (SH) (EN) – 59:42	5–2

10 min
Penalties
26 min
39
Shots
18

20 February 2010; 16:30	Latvia	0–6 (0–3, 0–2, 0–1)	Slovakia	Canada Hockey Place, Vancouver; Attendance: 17,023

Game reference

Edgars Masaļskis
Goalies
Jaroslav Halák
Referees:
(Canada) Dan O'Halloran
(Sweden) Marcus Vinnerborg
Linesmen:
(Ukraine) Andriy Kicha
(United States) Brian Murphy

0–1	2:44 – Ľ. Višňovský (J. Stümpel, R. Zedník) (PP)
0–2	9:11 – R. Zedník (M. Handzuš, Ľ. Bartečko)
0–3	17:08 – J. Stümpel (Ž. Pálffy)
0–4	21:07 – Mari. Hossa (J. Stümpel) (PP)
0–5	22:20 – M. Handzuš
0–6	57:20 – I. Baranka (M. Štrbák, M. Handzuš)

6 min
Penalties
8 min
21
Shots
37

21 February 2010; 12:00	Russia	4–2 (1–1, 1–0, 2–1)	Czech Republic	Canada Hockey Place, Vancouver; Attendance: 17,114

Game reference

Evgeni Nabokov
Goalies
Tomáš Vokoun
Referees:
(Canada) Dan O'Halloran
(Canada) Guy Pellerin
Linesmen:
(United States) Peter Feola
(Canada) Jean Morin

E. Malkin (P. Datsyuk, A. Ovechkin) (PP) – 15:13	1–0
	1–1	19:06 – T. Plekanec (P. Eliáš, T. Kaberle) (PP2)
V. Kozlov (A. Radulov, S. Fedorov) – 34:34	2–1
E. Malkin (A. Semin, F. Tyutin) – 41:49	3–1
	3–2	54:51 – M. Michálek (M. Židlický, M. Blaťák)
P. Datsyuk (E. Malkin, A. Ovechkin) (EN) – 59:47	4–2

12 min
Penalties
6 min
31
Shots
25

=== Group C ===
Team	Pld	W	OTW	OTL	L	GF	GA	GD	Pts	Qualification
Sweden	3	3	0	0	0	9	2	+7	9	Quarterfinals
Finland	3	2	0	0	1	10	4	+6	6	Quarterfinals
Belarus	3	1	0	0	2	8	12	−4	3	
Germany	3	0	0	0	3	3	12	−9	0	

Source: IIHF

All times are local (UTC−08:00).

17 February 2010; 12:00	Finland	5–1 (2–0, 1–1, 2–0)	Belarus	Canada Hockey Place, Vancouver; Attendance: 16,639

Game reference

Miikka Kiprusoff
Goalies
Vitali Koval
Referees:
(Canada) Paul Devorski
(Slovakia) Peter Ország
Linesmen:
(United States) Brian Murphy
(Slovakia) Milan Novak

O. Jokinen (S. Koivu, T. Selänne) (PP) – 3:24	1–0
N. Hagman (M. Koivu, J. Pitkänen) (PP) – 17:50	2–0
	2–1	20:21 – S. Kostitsyn (S. Demagin)
N. Hagman (M. Koivu) – 36:52	3–1
V. Filppula (M. Koivu) – 40:23	4–1
J. Ruutu (L. Kukkonen, N. Kapanen) – 52:59	5–1

4 min
Penalties
12 min
45
Shots
12

17 February 2010; 16:30	Sweden	2–0 (0–0, 2–0, 0–0)	Germany	Canada Hockey Place, Vancouver; Attendance: 16,966

Game reference
Henrik Lundqvist	Goalies	Thomas Greiss	Referees: (Canada) Marc Joannette (Canada) Guy Pellerin; Linesmen: (Ukraine) Andriy Kicha (United States) Thor Nelson
M. Öhlund (T. Enström, M. Weinhandl) (PP) – 24:29 / 1–0; L. Eriksson (N. Bäckström) – 34:13 / 2–0			Referees: (Canada) Marc Joannette (Canada) Guy Pellerin; Linesmen: (Ukraine) Andriy Kicha (United States) Thor Nelson
18 min	Penalties	22 min	Referees: (Canada) Marc Joannette (Canada) Guy Pellerin; Linesmen: (Ukraine) Andriy Kicha (United States) Thor Nelson
25	Shots	21	Referees: (Canada) Marc Joannette (Canada) Guy Pellerin; Linesmen: (Ukraine) Andriy Kicha (United States) Thor Nelson

19 February 2010; 12:00	Belarus	2–4 (0–2, 1–1, 1–1)	Sweden	Canada Hockey Place, Vancouver; Attendance: 16,878

Game reference

Andrei Mezin
Goalies
Jonas Gustavsson
Referees:
(United States) Dennis LaRue
(Switzerland) Brent Reiber
Linesmen:
(United States) Brian Murphy
(Russia) Yuri Oskirko

	0–1	6:40 – D. Sedin (H. Sedin, M. Weinhandl)
	0–2	9:04 – D. Alfredsson (M. Johansson, N. Bäckström) (PP)
	0–3	29:35 – J. Franzén (S. Påhlsson, F. Modin)
D. Meleshko (N. Stasenko, A. Ryadinsky) (PP) – 34:40	1–3
D. Meleshko (A. Kulakov) – 51:33	2–3
	2–4	59:49 – D. Alfredsson (H. Sedin, D. Sedin)

8 min
Penalties
4 min
19
Shots
38

19 February 2010; 21:00	Finland	5–0 (1–0, 2–0, 2–0)	Germany	Canada Hockey Place, Vancouver; Attendance: 16,662

Game reference

Niklas Bäckström
Goalies
Dimitri Pätzold
Referees:
(Russia) Vyacheslav Bulanov
(Canada) Brad Watson
Linesmen:
(United States) Shane Heyer
(Canada) Sylvain Losier

T. Ruutu (J. Niskala, N. Hagman) (PP) – 4:21	1–0
K. Timonen (S. Koivu, O. Jokinen) (PP) – 24:04	2–0
K. Timonen (S. Salo, T. Selänne) (PP) – 36:03	3–0
J. Ruutu (V. Peltonen, N. Kapanen) – 47:10	4–0
J. Pitkänen (N. Hagman) (PP) – 49:01	5–0

6 min
Penalties
12 min
35
Shots
24

20 February 2010; 21:00	Germany	3–5 (1–1, 0–1, 2–3)	Belarus	Canada Hockey Place, Vancouver; Attendance: 16,979

Game reference

Thomas Greiss
Goalies
Vitali Koval
Referees:
(Switzerland) Danny Kurmann
(Canada) Bill McCreary
Linesmen:
(Czech Republic) Petr Blümel
(United States) Shane Heyer

D. Seidenberg (M. Sturm, M. Goc) (PP) – 5:39	1–0
	1–1	10:43 – A. Ugarov
	1–2	28:36 – A. Kalyuzhny (S. Kostitsyn, N. Stasenko)
	1–3	51:10 – S. Kostitsyn (K. Koltsov)
J. Tripp (A. Rankel) – 51:49	2–3
M. Goc (J. Hecht) – 52:10	3–3
	3–4	54:36 – R. Salei (A. Kalyuzhny, S. Kostitsyn) (PP)
	3–5	58:45 – A. Kalyuzhny (K. Koltsov, S. Kostitsyn)

8 min
Penalties
6 min
40
Shots
17

21 February 2010; 21:00	Sweden	3–0 (1–0, 2–0, 0–0)	Finland	Canada Hockey Place, Vancouver; Attendance: 17,410

Game reference

Henrik Lundqvist
Goalies
Miikka Kiprusoff
Referees:
(Canada) Marc Joannette
(Switzerland) Danny Kurmann
Linesmen:
(United States) Tim Nowak
(Russia) Yuri Oskirko

L. Eriksson (N. Bäckström, M. Johansson) (PP2) – 6:41	1–0
N. Bäckström (D. Sedin) – 24:19	2–0
L. Eriksson (J. Franzén, N. Bäckström) (PP) – 38:08	3–0

14 min
Penalties
33 min
32
Shots
20

=== Ranking after preliminary round ===
Team advances to Quarterfinals
Team must play in Qualification playoffs

Rank	Team	GP	GS	Pts	GD	GF	WR
1D	United States	3	1	9	+9	14	5
2D	Sweden	3	1	9	+7	9	3
3D	Russia	3	1	7	+7	13	1
4D	Finland	3	2	6	+6	10	4
5D	Czech Republic	3	2	6	+3	10	6
6D	Canada	3	2	5	+7	14	2
7D	Slovakia	3	3	5	+5	9	9
8D	Switzerland	3	3	3	−2	8	7
9D	Belarus	3	3	3	−4	8	8
10D	Norway	3	4	1	−14	5	11
11D	Germany	3	4	0	−9	3	12
12D	Latvia	3	4	0	−15	4	10

== Playoff round ==
Following the completion of the preliminary round, all teams were ranked 1D through 12D. To determine this ranking, the following criteria were used in the order presented:

- higher position in the group
- higher number of points
- better goal difference
- higher number of goals scored for
- better 2009 IIHF World Ranking.

=== Bracket ===
Qualification playoffs
8D	Switzerland	3^{‡}
9D	Belarus	2
5D	Czech Republic	3^{†}
12D	Latvia	2
6D	Canada	8
11D	Germany	2
7D	Slovakia	4
10D	Norway	3

Quarterfinals
1D	United States	2
E4	Switzerland	0
4D	Finland	2
E1	Czech Republic	0
3D	Russia	3
E2	Canada	7
2D	Sweden	3
E3	Slovakia	4

Semifinals
F1	United States	6
F4	Finland	1
F3	Canada	3
F2	Slovakia	2

Gold medal game
F1	United States	2
F3	Canada	3^{†}
Bronze medal game
F4	Finland	5
F2	Slovakia	3

† Indicates overtime victory
‡ Indicates shootout victory

=== Qualification playoffs ===
The top four ranked teams (1D–4D) received byes to and were deemed the home team in the quarterfinals as they were seeded to advance, with the remaining eight teams (5D–12D) playing qualification playoff games as follows:

- Czech Republic vs. Latvia (winner re-ranked as E1)
- Canada vs. Germany (winner re-ranked as E2)
- Slovakia vs. Norway (winner re-ranked as E3)
- Switzerland vs. Belarus (winner re-ranked as E4).

If the score remained even after regulation, a 10-minute overtime period was played. If neither team scored, a shoot out of three rounds of penalty shots decided the winner. The four winners of these qualification playoff games advanced to the quarterfinal round, while the losers of the qualification playoff games received a final ranking of 9 through 12 based on their preliminary round ranking.

All times are local (UTC−08:00)

23 February 2010; 12:00	Switzerland	3–2 (SO) (1–1, 1–1, 0–0, 0–0, 1–0)	Belarus	Canada Hockey Place, Vancouver; Attendance: 17,397

Game reference

Jonas Hiller
Goalies
Andrei Mezin
Referees:
(Canada) Paul Devorski
(Slovakia) Peter Ország
Linesmen:
(Czech Republic) Petr Blümel
(United States) Tim Nowak

	0–1	0:59 – A. Kalyuzhny (V. Kostyuchenok)
J. Sprunger (R. Wick, M. Plüss) (PP) – 12:25	1–1
H. Domenichelli (M. Streit, S. Blindenbacher) (PP) – 27:07	2–1
	2–2	35:42 – K. Zakharov (A. Ugarov, N. Stasenko) (PP)

T. Déruns
R. Lemm
I. Rüthemann (miss)
Shootout
(miss) O. Antonenko
D. Meleshko
(miss) S. Kostitsyn
10 min
Penalties
6 min
42
Shots
22

23 February 2010; 16:30	Canada	8–2 (1–0, 3–1, 4–1)	Germany	Canada Hockey Place, Vancouver; Attendance: 17,723

Game reference

Roberto Luongo
Goalies
Thomas Greiss
Referees:
(Finland) Jyri Rönn
(United States) Chris Rooney
Linesmen:
(Finland) Stefan Fonselius
(United States) Brian Murphy

J. Thornton (D. Heatley, D. Keith) – 10:13	1–0
S. Weber (M. Richards) – 22:32	2–0
J. Iginla (D. Doughty, E. Staal) (PP) – 23:41	3–0
J. Iginla (E. Staal, D. Boyle) – 28:50	4–0
	4–1	36:34 – M. Goc (C. Schmidt, M. Müller)
S. Crosby (E. Staal, D. Keith) – 41:10	5–1
M. Richards (B. Morrow, J. Toews) – 46:41	6–1
S. Niedermayer – 51:22	7–1
R. Nash (C. Pronger) – 56:28	8–1
	8–2	58:58 – M. Klinge (M. Müller, K. Hospelt)

6 min
Penalties
4 min
39
Shots
23

23 February 2010; 19:00	Czech Republic	3–2 (OT) (2–0, 0–0, 0–2, 1–0)	Latvia	UBC Thunderbird Arena, Vancouver; Attendance: 5,448

Game reference

Tomáš Vokoun
Goalies
Edgars Masaļskis
Referees:
(Canada) Bill McCreary
(Switzerland) Brent Reiber
Linesmen:
(Slovakia) Milan Novak
(Germany) Felix Winnekens

T. Rolinek (F. Kuba, M. Havlát) (PP) – 5:52	1–0
T. Fleischmann (D. Krejčí, R. Červenka) – 11:06	2–0
	2–1	52:02 – M. Cipulis (A. Ņiživijs, K. Rēdlihs)
	2–2	56:19 – M. Rēdlihs (A. Bērziņš, L. Dārziņš)
D. Krejčí (T. Fleischmann) – 65:10	3–2

10 min
Penalties
10 min
50
Shots
26

23 February 2010; 21:00	Slovakia	4–3 (3–1, 0–2, 1–0)	Norway	Canada Hockey Place, Vancouver; Attendance: 17,583

Game reference

Jaroslav Halák
Goalies
Pål Grotnes
Referees:
(Russia) Vyacheslav Bulanov
(Canada) Marc Joannette
Linesmen:
(Ukraine) Andriy Kicha
(Canada) Sylvain Losier

M. Handzuš (M. Gáborík, Mari. Hossa) (PP) – 7:03	1–0
M. Gáborík (P. Demitra, Z. Chára) (PP) – 9:48	2–0
	2–1	18:06 – M. Zuccarello (J. Holøs)
R. Zedník (J. Stümpel, Ž. Pálffy) (PP) – 18:52	3–1
	3–2	27:27 – T. Vikingstad (P. Thoresen, M. Zuccarello)
	3–3	39:59 – A. Bastiansen (M. Olimb, P. Thoresen)
M. Šatan (Ľ. Višňovský, R. Zedník) – 48:41	4–3

4 min
Penalties
29 min
40
Shots
19

=== Quarterfinals ===
Teams seeded D1 to D4 were the home teams. If the teams were tied after 60 minutes of regulation, a 10-minute overtime period decided the winner immediately upon the next goal. If the game remained tied after the overtime period, a penalty shot competition determined the winning team.

Following the quarterfinal games, the winning teams were re-ranked F1 through F4, with the winner of 1D vs. E4 re-ranked as F1, the winner of 2D vs. E3 re-ranked as F2, the winner of 3D vs. E2 re-ranked as F3, and the winner of 4D vs. E1 re-ranked as F4. The losers of the quarterfinal round games received a final ranking of 5 through 8 based on their preliminary round ranking.

All times are local (UTC−08:00).

24 February 2010; 12:00	United States	2–0 (0–0, 0–0, 2–0)	Switzerland	Canada Hockey Place, Vancouver; Attendance: 17,536

Game reference
Ryan Miller	Goalies	Jonas Hiller	Referees: (Canada) Paul Devorski (Slovakia) Peter Ország; Linesmen: (United States) Shane Heyer (Germany) Felix Winnekens
Z. Parise (B. Rafalski, P. Stastny) (PP) – 42:08 / 1–0; Z. Parise (EN) – 59:48 / 2–0			Referees: (Canada) Paul Devorski (Slovakia) Peter Ország; Linesmen: (United States) Shane Heyer (Germany) Felix Winnekens
6 min	Penalties	8 min	Referees: (Canada) Paul Devorski (Slovakia) Peter Ország; Linesmen: (United States) Shane Heyer (Germany) Felix Winnekens
44	Shots	19	Referees: (Canada) Paul Devorski (Slovakia) Peter Ország; Linesmen: (United States) Shane Heyer (Germany) Felix Winnekens

24 February 2010; 16:30	Russia	3–7 (1–4, 2–3, 0–0)	Canada	Canada Hockey Place, Vancouver; Attendance: 17,740

Game reference

Evgeni Nabokov (out 24:07) / Ilya Bryzgalov (in 24:07)
Goalies
Roberto Luongo
Referees:
(United States) Dennis LaRue
(Sweden) Marcus Vinnerborg
Linesmen:
(United States) Thor Nelson
(Slovakia) Milan Novak

	0–1	2:21 – R. Getzlaf (D. Boyle, C. Pronger)
	0–2	12:09 – D. Boyle (D. Heatley, P. Marleau) (PP)
	0–3	12:55 – R. Nash (J. Toews, M. Richards)
D. Kalinin (A. Volchenkov, S. Fedorov) – 14:39	1–3
	1–4	18:18 – B. Morrow (D. Boyle, D. Keith)
	1–5	23:10 – C. Perry (R. Getzlaf, D. Keith)
	1–6	24:07 – S. Weber (J. Toews, J. Iginla)
M. Afinogenov (I. Kovalchuk, D. Grebeshkov) – 24:46	2–6
	2–7	29:51 – C. Perry (E. Staal, R. Getzlaf)
S. Gonchar (E. Malkin) (PP) – 31:40	3–7

10 min
Penalties
10 min
28
Shots
42

24 February 2010; 19:00	Finland	2–0 (0–0, 0–0, 2–0)	Czech Republic	UBC Thunderbird Arena, Vancouver; Attendance: 5,461

Game reference
Miikka Kiprusoff	Goalies	Tomáš Vokoun	Referees: (Canada) Dan O'Halloran (Canada) Brad Watson; Linesmen: (Russia) Yuri Oskirko (Canada) Jay Sharrers
N. Hagman (J. Niskala) (PP) – 53:34 / 1–0; V. Filppula (M. Koivu) (EN) – 58:25 / 2–0			Referees: (Canada) Dan O'Halloran (Canada) Brad Watson; Linesmen: (Russia) Yuri Oskirko (Canada) Jay Sharrers
4 min	Penalties	12 min	Referees: (Canada) Dan O'Halloran (Canada) Brad Watson; Linesmen: (Russia) Yuri Oskirko (Canada) Jay Sharrers
31	Shots	31	Referees: (Canada) Dan O'Halloran (Canada) Brad Watson; Linesmen: (Russia) Yuri Oskirko (Canada) Jay Sharrers

24 February 2010; 21:00	Sweden	3–4 (0–0, 2–3, 1–1)	Slovakia	Canada Hockey Place, Vancouver; Attendance: 17,493

Game reference

Henrik Lundqvist
Goalies
Jaroslav Halák
Referees:
(Canada) Bill McCreary
(Finland) Jyri Rönn
Linesmen:
(United States) Peter Feola
(Canada) Jean Morin

	0–1	27:34 – M. Gáborík (Mari. Hossa, P. Demitra) (PP)
	0–2	28:11 – A. Sekera (R. Zedník, Ž. Pálffy)
P. Hörnqvist (P. Forsberg) – 33:49	1–2
H. Zetterberg (T. Enström) – 34:26	2–2
	2–3	39:12 – P. Demitra (Z. Chára, Mari. Hossa) (PP)
	2–4	49:01 – T. Kopecký (Mari. Hossa, Demitra)
D. Alfredsson (N. Bäckström, L. Eriksson) – 49:39	3–4

10 min
Penalties
6 min
29
Shots
14

=== Semifinals ===
All times are local (UTC−08:00).

26 February 2010; 12:00	United States	6–1 (6–0, 0–0, 0–1)	Finland	Canada Hockey Place, Vancouver; Attendance: 17,602

Game reference

Ryan Miller (out 48:29) / Tim Thomas (in 48:29)
Goalies
Miikka Kiprusoff (out 10:08) / Niklas Bäckström (in 10:08)
Referees:
(Canada) Dan O'Halloran
(Sweden) Marcus Vinnerborg
Linesmen:
(Czech Republic) Petr Blümel
(United States) Shane Heyer

R. Malone – 2:04	1–0
Z. Parise (P. Stastny, B. Rafalski) (PP) – 6:22	2–0
E. Johnson (J. Pavelski, R. Malone) (PP) – 8:36	3–0
P. Kane – 10:08	4–0
P. Kane (B. Rafalski) – 12:31	5–0
P. Stastny (J. Langenbrunner, Z. Parise) – 12:46	6–0
	6–1	54:46 – A. Miettinen (S. Lepistö) (PP)

6 min
Penalties
20 min
25
Shots
25

26 February 2010; 18:30	Canada	3–2 (2–0, 1–0, 0–2)	Slovakia	Canada Hockey Place, Vancouver; Attendance: 17,799

Game reference

Roberto Luongo
Goalies
Jaroslav Halák
Referees:
(United States) Dennis LaRue
(Finland) Jyri Rönn
Linesmen:
(Finland) Stefan Fonselius
(United States) Thor Nelson

P. Marleau (S. Weber, S. Niedermayer) – 13:30	1–0
B. Morrow (C. Pronger, R. Getzlaf) – 15:17	2–0
R. Getzlaf (C. Perry, C. Pronger) (PP) – 36:54	3–0
	3–1	51:35 – Ľ. Višňovský (J. Stümpel)
	3–2	55:07 – M. Handzuš (R. Zedník, M. Šatan)

2 min
Penalties
4 min
28
Shots
21

=== Bronze medal game ===
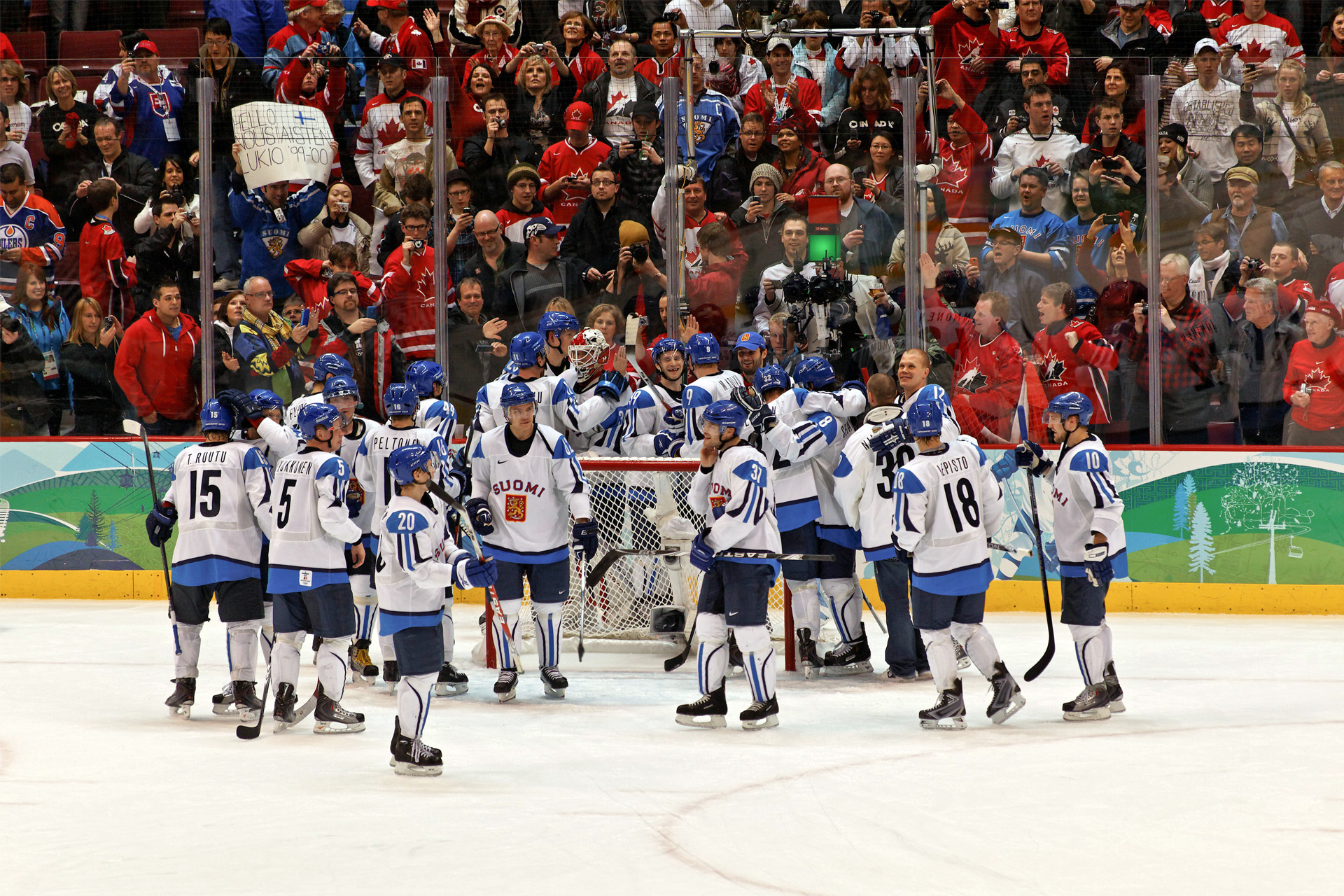
The Finnish team celebrating after winning the bronze medal

All times are local (UTC−08:00).

27 February 2010; 19:00	(bronze) Finland	5–3 (1–0, 0–3, 4–0)	Slovakia	Canada Hockey Place, Vancouver; Attendance: 17,322

Game reference

Miikka Kiprusoff
Goalies
Jaroslav Halák
Referees:
(Canada) Paul Devorski
(Canada) Brad Watson
Linesmen:
(Czech Republic) Petr Blümel
(Russia) Yuri Oskirko

S. Salo (PP) – 18:50	1–0
	1–1	29:56 – M. Gáborík (P. Demitra, Z. Chára) (PP)
	1–2	35:38 – Mari. Hossa (M. Handzuš, P. Demitra) (PP2)
	1–3	38:45 – P. Demitra (Mari. Hossa) (SH)
N. Hagman (K. Timonen) (PP) – 45:06	2–3
O. Jokinen (J. Ruutu) – 46:41	3–3
O. Jokinen (J. Pitkänen, M. Kiprusoff) (PP) – 48:41	4–3
V. Filppula (K. Timonen) (EN) – 59:49	5–3

14 min
Penalties
18 min
33
Shots
22

=== Gold medal game ===
All times are local (UTC−08:00).

28 February 2010; 12:15	(silver) United States	2–3 (OT) (0–1, 1–1, 1–0, 0–1)	Canada (gold)	Canada Hockey Place, Vancouver; Attendance: 17,748

Game reference

Ryan Miller
Goalies
Roberto Luongo
Referees:
(Canada) Bill McCreary
(Canada) Dan O'Halloran
Linesmen:
(Finland) Stefan Fonselius
(Canada) Jean Morin

	0–1	12:50 – J. Toews (M. Richards)
	0–2	27:13 – C. Perry (R. Getzlaf, D. Keith)
R. Kesler (P. Kane) – 32:44	1–2
Z. Parise (J. Langenbrunner, P. Kane) – 59:35	2–2
	2–3	67:40 – S. Crosby (J. Iginla)

4 min
Penalties
4 min
36
Shots
39

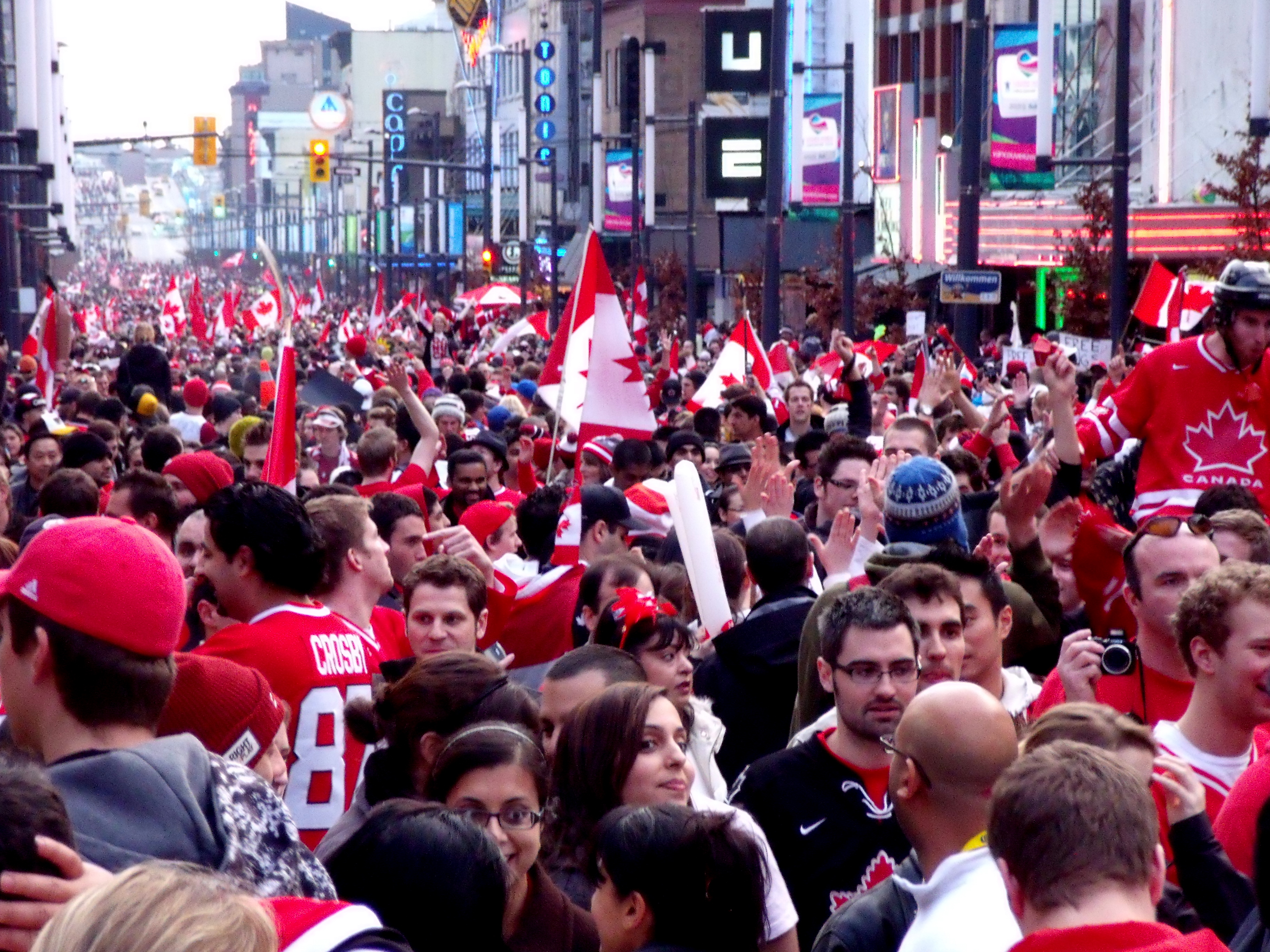
Crowds take to the streets of Vancouver to celebrate Canada's win in the gold medal game

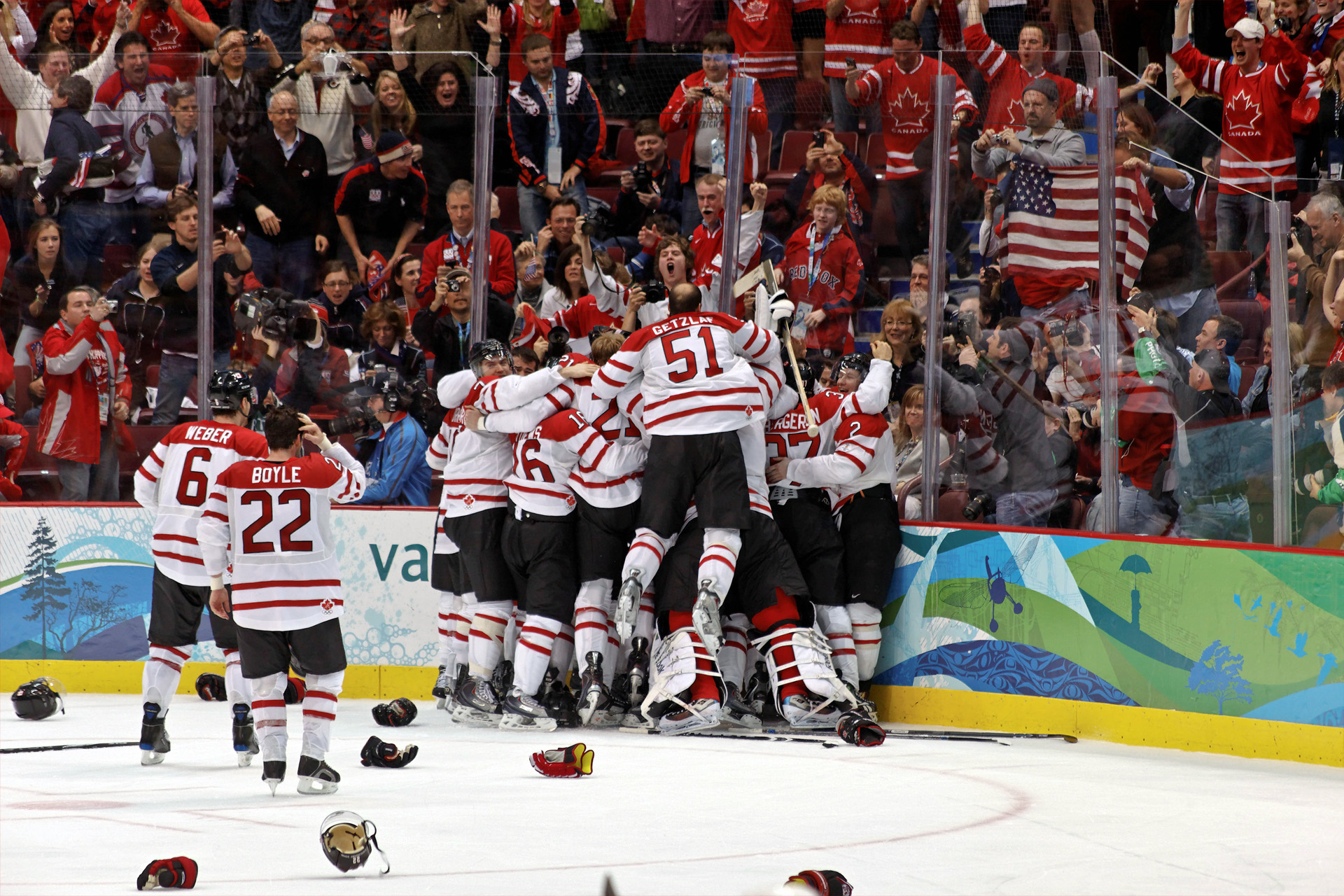
The Canadian team celebrating after winning the gold medal

The gold medal game was a rematch of the men's tournament in ice hockey at the 2002 Winter Olympics held in Salt Lake City, United States. In addition, Chris Pronger, Scott Niedermayer, Martin Brodeur and Jarome Iginla of Team Canada were returnees from the 2002 gold-winning squad and collected their second gold medal. Brian Rafalski and Chris Drury were the only players remaining from USA's 2002 silver squad.

The final score was a 3–2 win for Team Canada. Goal scorers for Canada were Jonathan Toews, Corey Perry and Sidney Crosby, with the winning goal scored in overtime. For USA, the goal scorers were Ryan Kesler and Zach Parise, the latter tying the game with 25 seconds left, forcing it to go into sudden death.

Sidney Crosby scored the game-winning goal off a pass from Jarome Iginla, seven minutes and forty seconds into overtime for Canada, gaining victory over the United States. The puck has been sent to the Hockey Hall of Fame in Toronto; in Canadian media, Crosby's goal has been compared in significance to the ones scored by Paul Henderson in the 1972 Summit Series and Mario Lemieux in the 1987 Canada Cup.

The referees for the final were Bill McCreary (Canada) and Dan O'Halloran (Canada), while the linesmen were Stefan Fonselius (Finland) and Jean Morin (Canada).

The gold medal game was the last competitive event at the Olympics before the closing ceremony.

==== Game summary ====
Period (time)	Action	Team	Player	Score Canada – USA
1 – 12:50	Goal	Canada	Jonathan Toews	1–0
1 – 14:02	Penalty	United States	Bobby Ryan	
2 – 02:33	Penalty	United States	Ryan Malone	
2 – 04:41	Penalty	Canada	Eric Staal	
2 – 07:13	Goal	Canada	Corey Perry	2–0
2 – 08:25	Penalty	Canada	Jonathan Toews	
2 – 12:44	Goal	United States	Ryan Kesler	2–1
3 – 18:33	Goaltender out	United States	Ryan Miller	
3 – 19:35	Goal	United States	Zach Parise	2–2
	Goaltender in	United States	Ryan Miller	
OT – 07:40	Goal	Canada	Sidney Crosby	3–2

==== Television ratings ====
The gold medal game drew a large audience in both Canada and the United States.

In Canada, the game drew an average 16.6 million viewers while 26.5 million Canadians watched at least part of the game. Canada's Olympic Broadcast Media Consortium claims that 22 million people – or two thirds of the Canadian population – were watching the gold medal game when Sidney Crosby scored in overtime, making the game the most-watched television broadcast in Canadian history. However, a new ratings system intended to better track out-of-home viewership was only implemented in August 2009, making it difficult to accurately compare these results with ratings prior to that date – specifically, the 2002 Canada–USA gold medal game in Salt Lake City, the record holder under the previous system. There was some speculation that the final game of the 1972 Summit Series had as many as 18 million viewers, although recently recovered Nielsen ratings archives indicate that only 4.255 million Canadians watched that game live.

In the United States, NBC said that the game was the most-watched hockey game in the U.S. in 30 years, drawing 27.6 million, the largest since the United States–Finland game that decided the gold medal at the 1980 Winter Olympics.

== Final rankings ==
The final standings of the tournament according to the IIHF:

1st place, gold medalist(s)	Canada
2nd place, silver medalist(s)	United States
3rd place, bronze medalist(s)	Finland
4	Slovakia
5	Sweden
6	Russia
7	Czech Republic
8	Switzerland
9	Belarus
10	Norway
11	Germany
12	Latvia

== Statistics ==
=== Average age ===
Team Finland was the oldest team in the tournament, averaging 31 years and 5 months. Team USA was the youngest team in the tournament, averaging 27 years and 2 months. Gold medalists Team Canada averaged 28 years and 2 months. Tournament average was 29 years.

=== Leading scorers ===
Rankings based upon points.

Rank	Player	GP	G	A	Pts	PIM	+/-
1	Pavol Demitra (SVK)	7	3	7	10	2	0
2	Marián Hossa (SVK)	7	3	6	9	6	0
3	Zach Parise (USA)	6	4	4	8	0	+4
3	Brian Rafalski (USA)	6	4	4	8	2	+7
3	Jonathan Toews (CAN)	7	1	7	8	2	+9
6	Jarome Iginla (CAN)	7	5	2	7	0	+5
7	Sidney Crosby (CAN)	7	4	3	7	4	+2
7	Dany Heatley (CAN)	7	4	3	7	4	+1
9	Ryan Getzlaf (CAN)	7	3	4	7	2	+2
10	Niklas Hagman (FIN)	6	4	2	6	2	−3

=== Leading goaltenders ===
Goalkeepers with 40% or more of their team's total minutes.

Rank	Goaltender	Minutes	GA	GAA	SV%	Saves	SO
1	Ryan Miller (USA)	355:07	8	1.35	94.56	139	1
2	Ilya Bryzgalov (RUS)	100:53	3	1.78	94.23	49	0
3	Tomáš Vokoun (CZE)	303:35	9	1.78	93.57	131	0
4	Henrik Lundqvist (SWE)	179:05	4	1.34	92.73	51	2
5	Roberto Luongo (CAN)	307:40	9	1.76	92.68	114	1

Shutout posters

- Henrik Lundqvist (SWE) (2)
- Niklas Bäckström (FIN)
- Jaroslav Halák (SVK)
- Miikka Kiprusoff (FIN)
- Roberto Luongo (CAN)
- Ryan Miller (USA)

== Awards ==
United States' Ryan Miller was named the most valuable player and received the Directorate Award for best goaltender of the tournament. Directorate Awards also went to Brian Rafalski (United States) for best defenceman, and to Jonathan Toews (Canada) for best forward.

The tournament all-star team was voted on by the international media at the conclusion of the event. The following players were named:

Position	Player	Team
G	Ryan Miller	United States
D	Brian Rafalski	United States
D	Shea Weber	Canada
F	Jonathan Toews	Canada
F	Zach Parise	United States
F	Pavol Demitra	Slovakia

Toews, along with Brent Seabrook and Duncan Keith would become the fourth, fifth and sixth players to win both Olympic gold medal and Stanley Cup (with the Chicago Blackhawks) in the same year, following Ken Morrow 1980, and Steve Yzerman and Brendan Shanahan (2002). Patrick Kane would become the fourth player to win both Olympic silver medal and Stanley Cup in the same year, following Red Wings Sergei Fedorov in 1998, and Chris Chelios and Brett Hull in 2002.

=== Triple Gold Club ===
The Triple Gold Club, made up of individuals who have won the Stanley Cup plus gold medals at the Olympics and World Championships, gained two new members:

- Team Canada centre Eric Staal became the 23rd player to win all three competitions. He had previously won the Stanley Cup in 2006 with the Carolina Hurricanes and the World Championships in 2007.
- Team Canada head coach Mike Babcock became the first coach in the Triple Gold Club. He had led Team Canada to World Championships gold in 2004 and the Detroit Red Wings to the Stanley Cup in 2008.

Later the same season, Team Canada centre Jonathan Toews would go on to become the 24th and youngest player in the Triple Gold Club, following up his Olympic gold medal with the Stanley Cup with the Chicago Blackhawks just four months after winning Olympic gold. He had previously won the World Championships in 2007.

== Officials ==
Games were primarily officiated by NHL referees, a stipulation by the NHL if most Olympic players are NHLers, according to the IIHF (not NHL) rules.

Referees
Name	National affiliation	League
Vyacheslav Bulanov	Russia	KHL
Paul Devorski	Canada	NHL
Marc Joannette	Canada	NHL
Danny Kurmann	Switzerland	National League A
Dennis LaRue	United States	NHL
Bill McCreary	Canada	NHL
Dan O'Halloran	Canada	NHL
Peter Ország	Slovakia	Slovak Extraliga
Guy Pellerin	Canada	QMJHL
Brent Reiber	Switzerland	National League A
Jyri Rönn	Finland	SM-liiga
Chris Rooney	United States	NHL
Marcus Vinnerborg	Sweden	Elitserien
Brad Watson	Canada	NHL

Linesmen
Name	National affiliation	League
Petr Blümel	Czech Republic	Czech Extraliga
Peter Feola	United States	AHL, ECACHL
Stefan Fonselius	Finland	SM-liiga
Shane Heyer	Canada	NHL
Andriy Kicha	Ukraine	Ukrainian Major League
Sylvain Losier	Canada	QMJHL
Jean Morin	Canada	NHL
Brian Murphy	United States	NHL
Thor Nelson	United States	NHL
Milan Novák	Slovakia	Slovak Extraliga
Tim Nowak	United States	NHL
Yuriy Oskirko	Russia	KHL
Jay Sharrers	Canada	NHL
Felix Winnekens	Germany	Deutsche Eishockey Liga
