= Jaroslav Halák =

Slovak ice hockey player (born 1985)

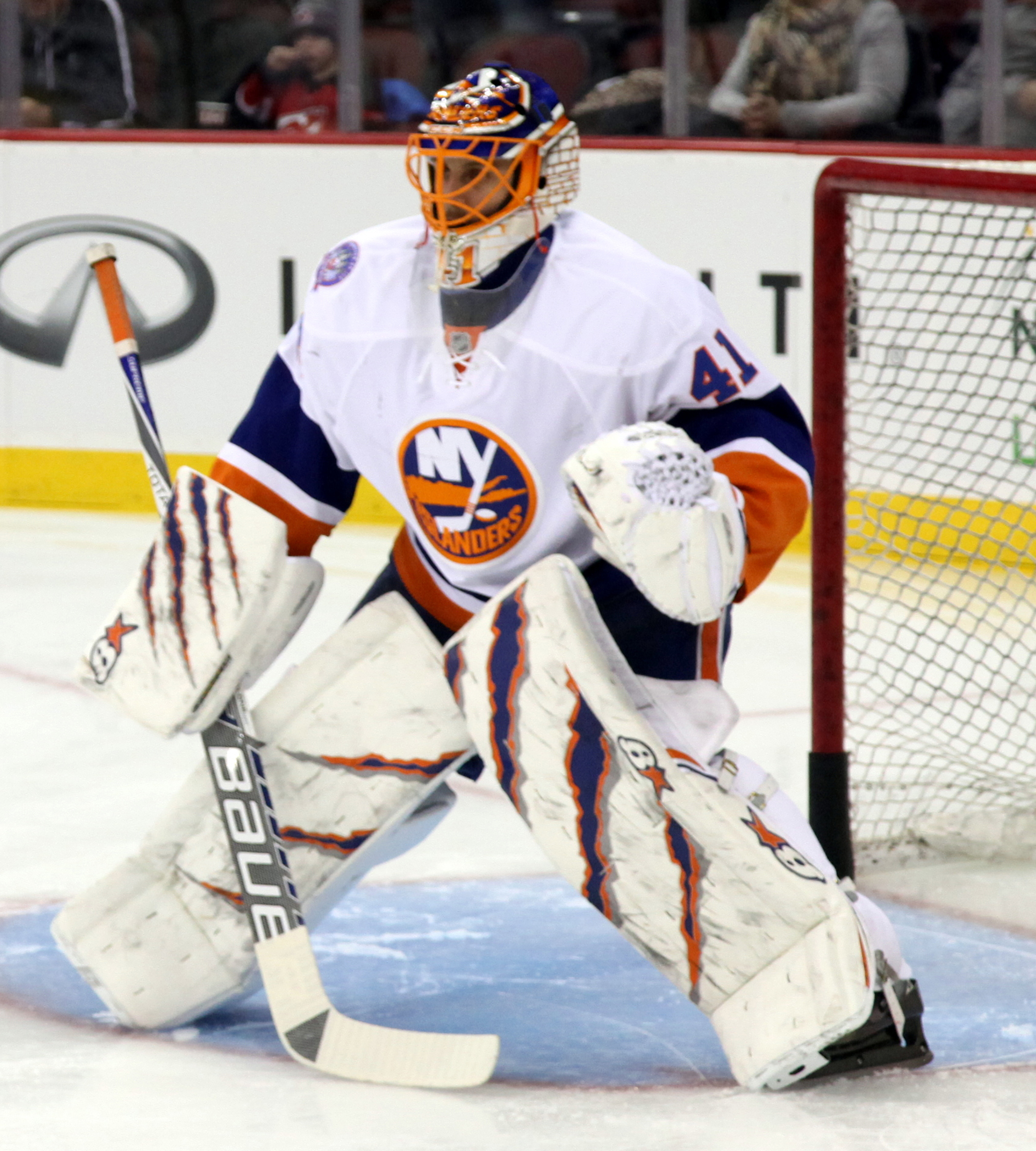
- Halák with the New York Islanders in 2015
- Born: 13 May 1985 (age 41) Bratislava, Czechoslovakia
- Height: 5 ft 11 in (180 cm)
- Weight: 182 lb (83 kg; 13 st 0 lb)
- Position: Goaltender
- Played for: Slovan Bratislava; Dukla Senica; Hamilton Bulldogs; Montreal Canadiens; St. Louis Blues; Washington Capitals; New York Islanders; Boston Bruins; Vancouver Canucks; New York Rangers
- National team: Slovakia
- NHL draft: 271st overall, 2003; Montreal Canadiens
- Playing career: 2005–2023

Jaroslav Halák (Slovak pronunciation: [ˈjarɔslaw ˈɦalaːk]; born 13 May 1985) is a Slovak former professional ice hockey goaltender. He was selected in the ninth round, 271st overall, by the Montreal Canadiens in the 2003 NHL entry draft. Halák played for the Canadiens as well as the Boston Bruins, New York Islanders, New York Rangers, St. Louis Blues, Vancouver Canucks, and Washington Capitals.

== Playing career ==
=== Youth clubs ===
Halák started playing hockey in the Bratislava team HK Ružinov, later played for HC Slovan Bratislava and in 2004, he was on a loan in HC Dukla Senica.

=== Montreal Canadiens and St. Louis Blues ===
Halák played for the American Hockey League's (AHL) Hamilton Bulldogs during the 2006–07 season before being called up to their National Hockey League (NHL) parent team, the Montreal Canadiens on 15 February 2007, after an injury to the Canadiens' starting goaltender, Cristobal Huet. At the time of his call-up, Halák had a 2.00 goals against average (GAA) with the Bulldogs, the lowest in the AHL. He played his first NHL game on 18 February 2007, stopping 31 shots in a 3–2 win over the Columbus Blue Jackets. Halák earned his first career NHL shutout on 20 March 2007, making thirty saves to keep the Canadiens' rival Boston Bruins off the board with a 1–0 victory.

Halák was assigned to the Bulldogs for the majority of the 2007–08 season. However, after the Canadiens traded Huet on 26 February 2008, Halák took over full-time as the Canadiens back-up goaltender. He started his first playoff game on 30 April 2008 against the Philadelphia Flyers (a 4–2 loss) after sub-par performances from newly appointed starter Carey Price, who once again took over in the following game. He fulfilled back-up duties for the Canadiens into the following season. However, Halák's strong play coupled with inconsistent performances from Price led to an opportunity for Halák to step into a larger role. Ultimately, based on his strong play for the Canadiens and for Slovakia at the Vancouver Olympics, there was a strong internal push to designate Halák the team's starting goaltender. Halák went on to be named the Canadiens' Molson Cup Player of the Year for the season and was designated the starter heading into their first-round playoff match-up against the Presidents' Trophy-winning Washington Capitals. In the sixth game of the series, Halák stopped 53 shots to set a club record for a playoff game (in regulation-time), leading the Canadiens to a 4–1 victory. Ultimately, the Canadiens overcame a 3–1 series deficit to win the series in seven games, marking one of the biggest upsets in NHL history. The win was attributed largely to Halák's play as he turned aside 131 of Washington's 134 shots in games 5 through 7, frustrating the league's top scoring team from the regular season. After defeating the Pittsburgh Penguins in seven games, the Canadiens fell to the Philadelphia Flyers in the Eastern Conference Final with a 4–1 series loss.

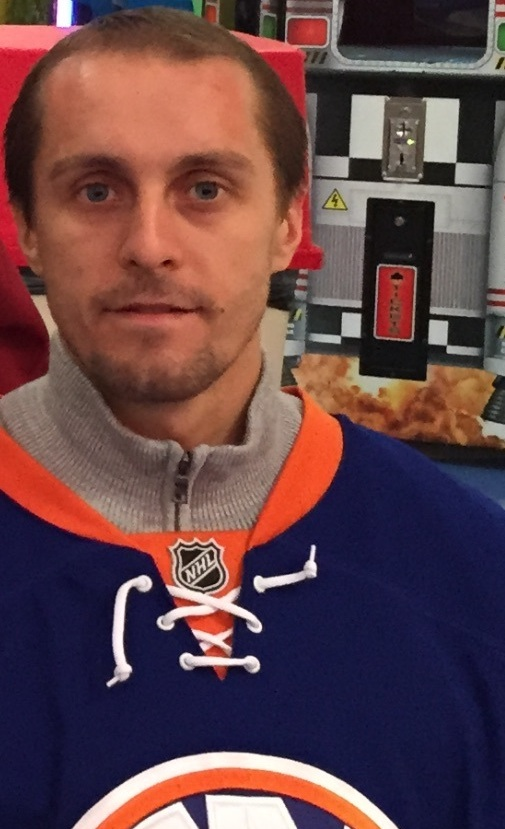
Halák with the New York Islanders in 2014

At the conclusion of the season, both Halák and Price became restricted free agents and a great goaltending debate emerged in Montreal over who would remain with the team, playoff-hero Halák, or the younger Price. After weeks of media speculation the Canadiens chose Price and on 17 June, controversially traded Halák to the St. Louis Blues in exchange for two prospects, center Lars Eller and right-winger Ian Schultz. On 6 July 2010, Halák signed a four-year $15 million contract with the Blues. Prior to the 2010–11 season, Halák held an autograph-signing in Montreal as a farewell and goodwill gesture, to thank fans for their support as well as to raise funds for the Montreal Ste-Justine Children's Hospital. Though 500 fans were expected, more than 5000 fans attended the event held at the Fairview Pointe-Claire mall, testifying to his popularity with Canadiens' fans.

Halák played his first game with the Blues on 9 October 2010, earning a 2–1 victory over the Flyers. Halák would earn his first shutout with the team on 23 October 2010 at home against the Penguins, stopping 31 shots in a 1–0 overtime victory. Halák had a quick start, going 8–1–1 and would share the starting role with Brian Elliott for the remainder of the season. In the 2011–12 season, Halák and Elliott were awarded the William M. Jennings Trophy for allowing the fewest goals (165 collectively) in the regular season.

=== Trades and New York Islanders ===
Prior to the 2013–14 trade deadline, the Blues traded Halák, Chris Stewart, William Carrier, a first-round draft pick in 2015, and a conditional third-round draft pick in 2014 to the Buffalo Sabres in exchange for Ryan Miller and Steve Ott on 28 February 2014. Halák did not appear in a game for the Sabres and was ultimately dealt along with a third round draft pick to the Washington Capitals in exchange for Michal Neuvirth and Rostislav Klesla at the trade deadline five days later. Halák dressed for the Sabres as the backup goaltender in one game, making him the 10th player in Sabres history to dress for the team in a regular-season game but not play.

As pending unrestricted free agent, Halák's rights were traded by the Capitals to the New York Islanders on 1 May 2014 for a fourth round pick in the 2014 draft. On 22 May 2014, the Islanders signed him to a four-year contract worth $18 million. On 4 December 2014, the Islanders defeated the Ottawa Senators, with Halák earning his 11th consecutive win and set a franchise record previously held by Billy Smith, who won 10 consecutive games. On 15 January 2015, he was named to the 2015 NHL All Star Game as an injury replacement for Nashville Predators goalie Pekka Rinne, marking his first NHL All-Star appearance. At the game, he played for the team captained by the Chicago Blackhawks' Jonathan Toews and stopped six of ten shots in the third period as he, Islanders' teammate John Tavares, and Team Toews won the game by a record setting score of 17–12. On 19 February 2015, he tied the Islanders' franchise record for most wins in a season, with his 32nd win coming in a 5–2 win against the Predators. Eight days later on 27 February, he set a new franchise record by recording his 33rd win of the season in a 2–1 win against the Calgary Flames.

In March 2016, Halák suffered lower-body injury and missed the rest of the season, with Thomas Greiss filling in during the injury. During the 2016–17 season, on 30 December 2016, Halák was placed on waivers. The next day, he was assigned to the Bridgeport Sound Tigers of the American Hockey League (AHL).

=== Boston Bruins ===
After completing his four-year contract with the Islanders, Halák left as a free agent to sign a two-year, $5.5 million contract with the Boston Bruins on 1 July 2018. Halák had his first start as a Bruin on 4 October 2018 in a 4–0 shutout win against the Buffalo Sabres. Halák made his return to Long Island on March 19 and got a tribute video played for him along with a standing ovation from the fans in attendance. He ended the season with 22 wins and 5 shutouts in 40 total games.

On 1 May 2020, the Bruins signed Halák to a one-year, $2.25 million contract extension.

During the shortened 2019–20 season, Halák won his second Jennings Trophy, winning it alongside Tuukka Rask. Halák had 18 wins and three shutouts in 31 total games.

On 15 August 2020, Halák was named starter by the Bruins for the rest of the 2020 Stanley Cup playoffs after Rask left the team for personal reasons before the third game of the first-round series against the Carolina Hurricanes.

=== Vancouver Canucks ===
Following his third season with the Bruins, Halák left as a free agent and was signed to a one-year, $1.5 million contract with the Vancouver Canucks on 28 July 2021.

=== New York Rangers ===
On 13 July 2022, Halák signed as a free agent to a one-year, $1.55 million contract with the New York Rangers. Halák recorded his first win as a Ranger on 30 November, against the Ottawa Senators, making 34 saves in a 3–1 victory. He finished the season with a 10–9–5 record in 25 games with a goals against average of 2.72 and a save percentage of .903.

=== Inactivity and retirement ===
On 6 November 2023, Halák was signed to a professional tryout (PTO) contract by the Carolina Hurricanes. He was released by the team on 20 November.

After being unable to sign an NHL contract, Halák signed a one-year contract with his original club, Slovan Bratislava of the Slovak Extraliga, on 15 February 2024. However, he did not play any games with the team.

On 18 July 2025, after not playing a competitive game in over two years, Halák officially announced his retirement from hockey.

== International play ==
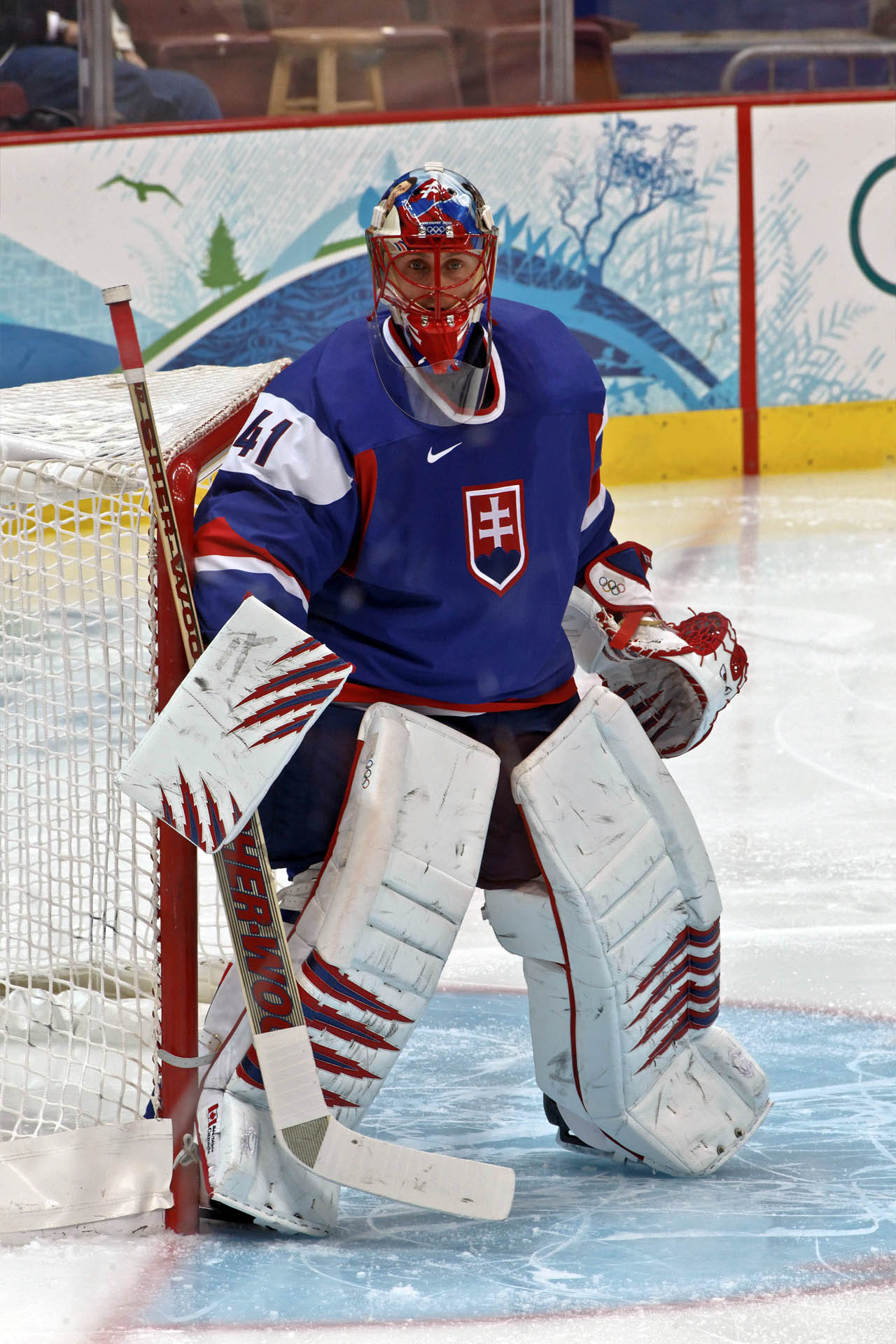
- Halák in 2010 with the Slovakia men's national ice hockey team

Medal record

Men's ice hockey

Representing Slovakia

World U18 Championships
| Silver medal – second place | 2003 Russia | |

Halák has represented Slovakia internationally on multiple occasions. He first played for his country at the IIHF World U20 Championship, starting every game for the team in both the 2004 and 2005 tournaments, where the team finished sixth and seventh, respectively. Halák's first senior international experience came in 2007 as he played in the 2007 Men's World Ice Hockey Championships, starting 2 games and earning a 1–1 record. The Slovaks finished in sixth place. Halák again represented Slovakia at the 2009 tournament, where the team finished 10th overall.

In February 2010, Halák was named the starting goaltender for the Slovak national team in the 2010 Winter Olympics, along with future Bruins defensive teammate Zdeno Chára. He stopped 36 of 37 shots in a preliminary round victory against a strong Russian team, and went on to start every game for the Slovaks. Halák and his teammates finished fourth overall in the tournament after losing against Finland in the bronze medal match. This was the best finish ever for Slovakia at the Olympics, one spot better than their fifth-place finish during the 2006 Olympics. Halák played in two of Slovakia's four games during the 2014 Olympics, losing both games as the team would go on to finish 11th.

At the 2016 World Cup of Hockey, Halák led the underdog Team Europe to a 2-1-0 record in the group stage, good for 2nd place in Group A. He then backstopped the team to the final, where they lost in the best of three to Team Canada, 3-1 and 2–1, respectively.

== Personal life ==
Halák is married to his wife Petra, the couple have a daughter Inna and son Nathan. Both of his children have followed in his footsteps and are goaltenders.

== Career statistics ==
=== Regular season and playoffs ===
| | | | Regular season | | | | | | | | | Playoffs |
| Season | Team | League | GP | W | L | T/OT | MIN | GA | SO | GAA | SV% | GP | W | L | MIN | GA | SO | GAA | SV% |
|---|---|---|---|---|---|---|---|---|---|---|---|---|---|---|---|---|---|---|---|
| 2001–02 | Slovan Bratislava | U20 | 22 | — | — | — | 1257 | 41 | 0 | 1.96 | — | 6 | 6 | 0 | 353 | 7 | 2 | 1.19 | — |
| 2002–03 | Slovan Bratislava | U20 | 20 | 13 | 3 | 3 | 1200 | 41 | 1 | 2.02 | — | — | — | — | — | — | — | — | — |
| 2003–04 | Slovan Bratislava | U20 | 29 | — | — | — | 1694 | 51 | 5 | 1.81 | — | — | — | — | — | — | — | — | — |
| 2003–04 | Slovan Bratislava | Slovak | 12 | — | — | — | 651 | 18 | 0 | 1.66 | .942 | 1 | — | — | 45 | 6 | 0 | 8.00 | .903 |
| 2003–04 | Dukla Senica | Slovak.1 | 21 | — | — | — | 1240 | 54 | 1 | 2.61 | — | — | — | — | — | — | — | — | — |
| 2004–05 | Lewiston Maineiacs | QMJHL | 47 | 24 | 17 | 4 | 2697 | 125 | 4 | 2.78 | .913 | 8 | 4 | 4 | 460 | 27 | 0 | 3.52 | .908 |
| 2005–06 | Long Beach Ice Dogs | ECHL | 20 | 11 | 4 | 2 | 1026 | 35 | 2 | 2.05 | .932 | 4 | 2 | 2 | 252 | 13 | 0 | 3.09 | .910 |
| 2005–06 | Hamilton Bulldogs | AHL | 13 | 7 | 6 | 0 | 786 | 30 | 3 | 2.29 | .927 | — | — | — | — | — | — | — | — |
| 2006–07 | Hamilton Bulldogs | AHL | 28 | 16 | 11 | 0 | 1618 | 54 | 6 | 2.00 | .932 | — | — | — | — | — | — | — | — |
| 2006–07 | Montreal Canadiens | NHL | 16 | 10 | 6 | 0 | 912 | 44 | 2 | 2.89 | .906 | — | — | — | — | — | — | — | — |
| 2007–08 | Hamilton Bulldogs | AHL | 8 | 3 | 2 | 2 | 454 | 22 | 0 | 2.91 | .901 | — | — | — | — | — | — | — | — |
| 2007–08 | Montreal Canadiens | NHL | 6 | 2 | 1 | 1 | 284 | 10 | 1 | 2.11 | .934 | 2 | 0 | 1 | 77 | 3 | 0 | 2.34 | .889 |
| 2008–09 | Montreal Canadiens | NHL | 34 | 18 | 14 | 1 | 1931 | 92 | 1 | 2.86 | .915 | 1 | 0 | 0 | 20 | 0 | 0 | 0.00 | 1.000 |
| 2009–10 | Montreal Canadiens | NHL | 45 | 26 | 13 | 5 | 2630 | 105 | 5 | 2.40 | .924 | 18 | 9 | 9 | 1013 | 43 | 0 | 2.55 | .923 |
| 2010–11 | St. Louis Blues | NHL | 57 | 27 | 21 | 7 | 3294 | 136 | 7 | 2.48 | .910 | — | — | — | — | — | — | — | — |
| 2011–12 | St. Louis Blues | NHL | 46 | 26 | 12 | 7 | 2747 | 90 | 6 | 1.97 | .926 | 2 | 1 | 1 | 104 | 3 | 0 | 1.73 | .935 |
| 2012–13 | Lausitzer Füchse | 2.GBun | 1 | 1 | 0 | 0 | 65 | 1 | 0 | 0.92 | .950 | — | — | — | — | — | — | — | — |
| 2012–13 | St. Louis Blues | NHL | 16 | 6 | 5 | 1 | 813 | 29 | 3 | 2.14 | .899 | — | — | — | — | — | — | — | — |
| 2013–14 | St. Louis Blues | NHL | 40 | 24 | 9 | 4 | 2238 | 83 | 4 | 2.23 | .917 | — | — | — | — | — | — | — | — |
| 2013–14 | Washington Capitals | NHL | 12 | 5 | 4 | 3 | 701 | 27 | 1 | 2.31 | .930 | — | — | — | — | — | — | — | — |
| 2014–15 | New York Islanders | NHL | 59 | 38 | 17 | 4 | 3550 | 144 | 6 | 2.43 | .914 | 7 | 3 | 4 | 418 | 16 | 0 | 2.30 | .926 |
| 2015–16 | New York Islanders | NHL | 36 | 18 | 13 | 4 | 2091 | 80 | 3 | 2.30 | .919 | — | — | — | — | — | — | — | — |
| 2016–17 | New York Islanders | NHL | 28 | 12 | 9 | 5 | 1606 | 75 | 2 | 2.80 | .915 | — | — | — | — | — | — | — | — |
| 2016–17 | Bridgeport Sound Tigers | AHL | 27 | 17 | 7 | 4 | 1536 | 55 | 2 | 2.15 | .925 | — | — | — | — | — | — | — | — |
| 2017–18 | New York Islanders | NHL | 54 | 20 | 26 | 6 | 3025 | 161 | 1 | 3.19 | .908 | — | — | — | — | — | — | — | — |
| 2018–19 | Boston Bruins | NHL | 40 | 22 | 11 | 4 | 2309 | 90 | 5 | 2.34 | .922 | — | — | — | — | — | — | — | — |
| 2019–20 | Boston Bruins | NHL | 31 | 18 | 6 | 6 | 1834 | 73 | 3 | 2.39 | .919 | 9 | 4 | 5 | 544 | 25 | 0 | 2.76 | .902 |
| 2020–21 | Boston Bruins | NHL | 19 | 9 | 6 | 4 | 1091 | 46 | 2 | 2.53 | .905 | — | — | — | — | — | — | — | — |
| 2021–22 | Vancouver Canucks | NHL | 17 | 4 | 7 | 2 | 797 | 39 | 0 | 2.94 | .903 | — | — | — | — | — | — | — | — |
| 2022–23 | New York Rangers | NHL | 25 | 10 | 9 | 5 | 1454 | 66 | 1 | 2.72 | .903 | — | — | — | — | — | — | — | — |
| NHL totals | | | 581 | 295 | 189 | 69 | 33,303 | 1,390 | 53 | 2.50 | .915 | 39 | 17 | 20 | 2,177 | 90 | 0 | 2.48 | .919 |

=== International ===
| Year | Team | Event | Result | GP | W | L | T | MIN | GA | SO | GAA | SV% |
|---|---|---|---|---|---|---|---|---|---|---|---|---|
| 2002 | Slovakia | WJC18 | 8th | 7 | — | — | — | 416 | 18 | 1 | 2.59 | .887 |
| 2003 | Slovakia | WJC18 | 2nd place, silver medalist(s) | 7 | 5 | 2 | 0 | 420 | 14 | 0 | 2.00 | .932 |
| 2004 | Slovakia | WJC | 6th | 6 | 2 | 3 | 1 | 360 | 14 | 2 | 2.33 | .930 |
| 2005 | Slovakia | WJC | 7th | 6 | 4 | 2 | 0 | 360 | 13 | 2 | 2.17 | .916 |
| 2007 | Slovakia | WC | 6th | 2 | 1 | 1 | 0 | 119 | 5 | 1 | 2.52 | .904 |
| 2009 | Slovakia | WC | 10th | 4 | 1 | 2 | 0 | 189 | 10 | 0 | 3.17 | .872 |
| 2010 | Slovakia | OG | 4th | 7 | 3 | 3 | 0 | 423 | 17 | 1 | 2.41 | .911 |
| 2011 | Slovakia | WC | 10th | 6 | 2 | 4 | 0 | 354 | 15 | 0 | 2.54 | .909 |
| 2014 | Slovakia | OG | 11th | 2 | 0 | 2 | 0 | 93:30 | 8 | 0 | 5.13 | .857 |
| 2016 | Team Europe | WCH | 2nd | 6 | 3 | 3 | 0 | 362 | 13 | 1 | 2.15 | .941 |
| Junior totals | | | | 26 | — | — | — | 1556 | 59 | 5 | — | — |
| Senior totals | | | | 27 | 10 | 15 | 0 | 1540 | 68 | 3 | 2.70 | .907 |

== Awards and achievements ==
- 2-time William M. Jennings Trophy winner – 2012, 2020
- New York Islanders franchise record of the most consecutive wins (11, 2014–15)
- New York Islanders franchise record for wins in a season (38, 2014–15)
- Played in NHL All-Star Game in 2015

Awards and achievements
| Preceded by Roberto Luongo; Cory Schneider | Winner of the William M. Jennings Trophy; 2011–12; With: Brian Elliott | Succeeded by Corey Crawford; Ray Emery |
| Preceded by Thomas Greiss; Robin Lehner | Winner of the William M. Jennings Trophy; 2019–20; With: Tuukka Rask | Succeeded by Marc-André Fleury; Robin Lehner |
