= Guy Pellerin =

Canadian ice hockey official

- Born: Moncton, New Brunswick, Canada
- Occupation: QMJHL referee (1994-present)

Guy Pellerin (born August 14, 1971, in Moncton, New Brunswick, Canada) is a Canadian referee in the Quebec Major Junior Hockey League, since the 1994-95 QMJHL season. Pellerin was selected to referee the men's ice hockey at the 2010 Vancouver Olympics. Pellerin has also refereed the Canadian University Championship and the World Junior Championship (U-17) and World Senior Championship (Division 1).
