= Miroslav Blaťák =

Czech ice hockey player (born 1982)

- Born: May 25, 1982 (age 43) Gottwaldov, Czechoslovakia
- Height: 6 ft 0 in (183 cm)
- Weight: 174 lb (79 kg; 12 st 6 lb)
- Position: Defence
- Shot: Left
- Played for: Salavat Yulaev Ufa; Avangard Omsk; Severstal Cherepovets; HC Zlin; Mora IK; HC Dukla Jihlava; HC Uherske Hradiste
- National team: Czech Republic
- NHL draft: 129th overall, 2001; Detroit Red Wings
- Playing career: 1999–2017

Miroslav Blaťák (Czech pronunciation: [ˈmɪroslav ˈblacaːk]; born May 25, 1982) is a Czech professional ice hockey defenceman. He is currently a free agent.

Blaťák began playing for his hometown team HC Hamé Zlín. He also briefly played for Dukla Jihlava. He was drafted 129th overall by the Detroit Red Wings in the 2001 NHL entry draft but did not sign a contract. He instead remained with Zlín until 2006 where he moved to Sweden and signed for Mora IK. In 2007, Blaťák signed for Salavat Yulaev Ufa in Russia.

== Career statistics ==
=== Regular season and playoffs ===
			Regular season					Playoffs
Season	Team	League	GP	G	A	Pts	PIM	GP	G	A	Pts	PIM
1999–2000	HC Barum Continental Zlín	CZE U20	48	2	4	6	43	—	—	—	—	—
1999–2000	HC Barum Continental Zlín	ELH	2	0	0	0	0	—	—	—	—	—
1999–2000	HC Uherské Hradiště	CZE.3	1	0	1	1	0	2	1	1	2	4
2000–01	HC Continental Zlín	CZE U20	43	3	15	18	30	3	1	0	1	2
2000–01	HC Continental Zlín	ELH	8	0	2	2	0	6	0	0	0	0
2001–02	HC Continental Zlín	CZE U20	3	0	0	0	8	—	—	—	—	—
2001–02	HC Continental Zlín	ELH	39	4	7	11	18	11	1	2	3	8
2001–02	HC Dukla Jihlava	CZE.2	1	0	0	0	0	2	0	0	0	0
2002–03	HC Hamé Zlín	ELH	49	4	12	16	34	—	—	—	—	—
2003–04	HC Hamé Zlín	ELH	50	5	10	15	34	17	3	3	6	10
2004–05	HC Hamé Zlín	ELH	52	4	8	12	30	17	2	4	6	18
2005–06	HC Hamé Zlín	ELH	47	8	13	21	34	6	1	2	3	8
2006–07	Mora IK	SEL	53	6	15	21	30	4	1	1	2	6
2007–08	Salavat Yulaev Ufa	RSL	57	2	12	14	34	16	1	2	3	10
2008–09	Salavat Yulaev Ufa	KHL	54	4	11	15	41	4	0	0	0	0
2009–10	Salavat Yulaev Ufa	KHL	55	5	12	17	18	16	3	2	5	6
2010–11	Salavat Yulaev Ufa	KHL	51	9	20	29	10	21	4	2	6	14
2011–12	Salavat Yulaev Ufa	KHL	46	9	8	17	8	6	1	0	1	0
2012–13	Salavat Yulaev Ufa	KHL	41	6	6	12	12	14	0	7	7	2
2013–14	Avangard Omsk	KHL	54	3	14	17	20	—	—	—	—	—
2014–15	Avangard Omsk	KHL	45	2	6	8	10	8	0	0	0	0
2015–16	Severstal Cherepovets	KHL	18	1	2	3	2	—	—	—	—	—
2016–17	PSG Zlín	ELH	46	3	12	15	10	—	—	—	—	—
ELH totals			293	28	64	92	160	58	7	11	18	44
KHL totals			364	39	79	118	121	69	8	11	19	22

=== International ===
Year	Team	Event	GP	G	A	Pts	PIM
2000	Czech Republic	WJC18	6	0	1	1	4
2002	Czech Republic	WJC	7	3	4	7	2
2006	Czech Republic	WC	DNP	—	—	—	—
2009	Czech Republic	WC	7	3	1	4	8
2010	Czech Republic	OG	5	0	2	2	2
2010	Czech Republic	WC	9	2	1	3	4
2012	Czech Republic	WC	10	1	1	2	0
Junior totals			13	3	5	8	6
Senior totals			31	6	5	11	14

== International play ==
Miroslav Blaťák
Medal record

Representing Czech Republic

World Championships
Silver medal – second place	2006 Riga	Ice hockey
Gold medal – first place	2010 Cologne	Ice hockey
Bronze medal – third place	2012 Helsinki	Ice hockey

Played for the Czech Republic in:

- 2006 World Championships (silver medal)
- 2009 World Championships
- 2010 World Championships (Gold medal)
- 2010 Czech Republic Olympic hockey team
