= Thomas Déruns =

Swiss ice hockey player

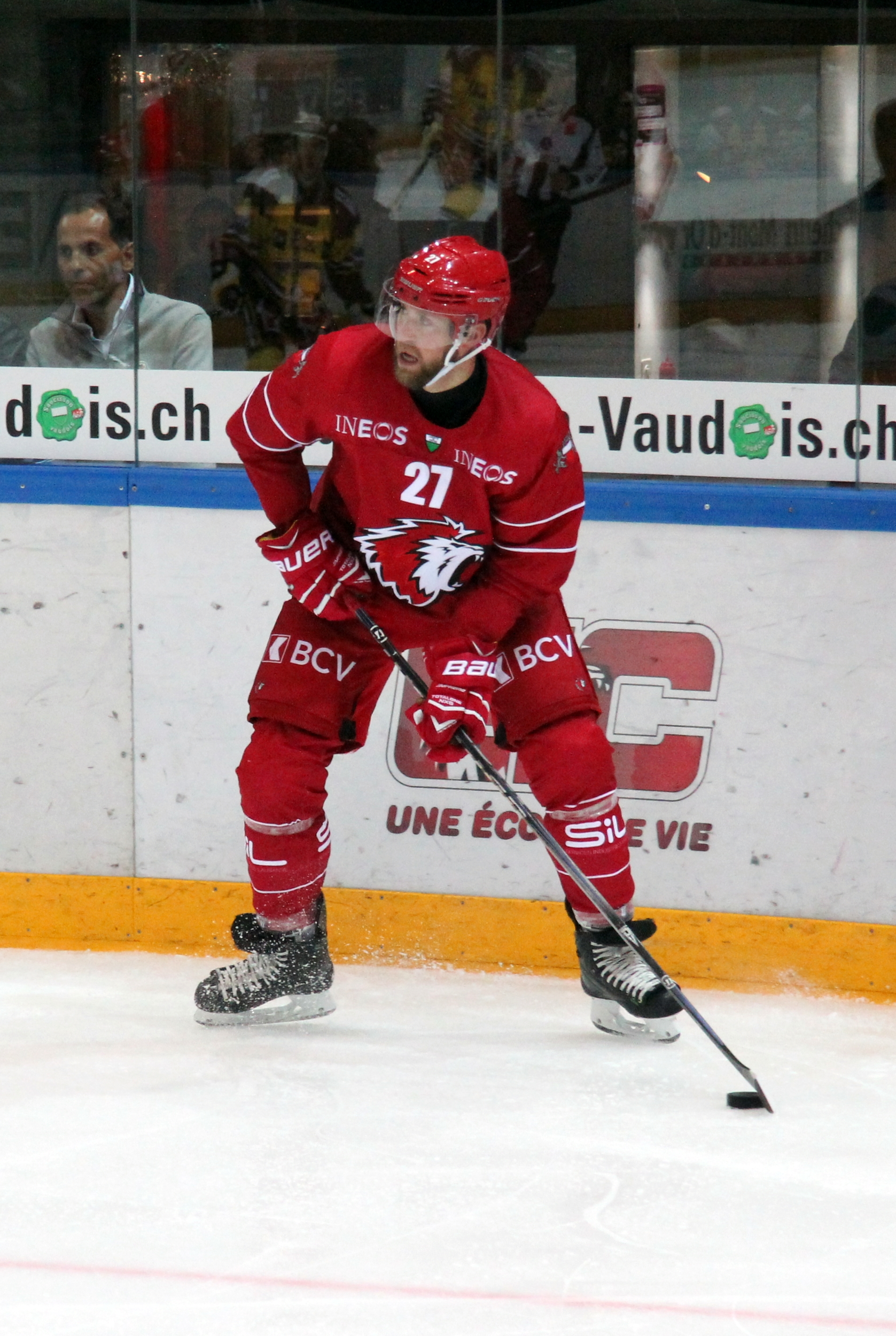
- Born: 1 March 1982 (age 43); La Chaux-de-Fonds, Switzerland
- Height: 6 ft 2 in (188 cm)
- Weight: 194 lb (88 kg; 13 st 12 lb)
- Position: Left wing
- Shot: Left
- Played for: HC La Chaux-de-Fonds; Genève-Servette HC; SC Bern; Lausanne HC
- National team: Switzerland
- Playing career: 2000–2017

Thomas Déruns (born 1 March 1982) is a Swiss former professional ice hockey forward who played exclusively in the National League A (NLA).

== Playing career ==
Déruns began playing with HC La Chaux-de-Fonds in 2000. He joined Genève-Servette in 2002.

Déruns was selected to play for the Swiss national team at the 2010 Winter Olympics. He previously represented Switzerland at the 2002 IIHF World U20 Championship, and the 2006, 2008 and 2009 Ice Hockey World Championships.

On 17 April 2010, Déruns scored a goal on Swiss National TV) in the Swiss National League A Playoff finals match for Geneva vs. Berne that brought him mass media attention all over the world.

== Career statistics ==
=== Regular season and playoffs ===
			Regular season					Playoffs
Season	Team	League	GP	G	A	Pts	PIM	GP	G	A	Pts	PIM
1998–99	HC La Chaux–de–Fonds	SUI.2 U20
1999–2000	HC La Chaux–de–Fonds	SUI.2 U20
1999–2000	HC La Chaux–de–Fonds	SUI.2	19	0	1	1	2	8	2	0	2	2
2000–01	HC La Chaux–de–Fonds	SUI.2 U20
2000–01	HC La Chaux–de–Fonds	NLA	39	2	7	9	6	—	—	—	—	—
2001–02	HC Lugano	SUI U20	1	1	1	2	2	—	—	—	—	—
2001–02	HC La Chaux–de–Fonds	SUI.2	32	14	26	40	50	10	6	6	12	8
2002–03	Genève–Servette HC	NLA	40	2	3	5	10	6	0	0	0	2
2002–03	HC La Chaux–de–Fonds	SUI.2	2	0	1	1	4	—	—	—	—	—
2003–04	Genève–Servette HC	NLA	9	1	0	1	0	10	0	0	0	6
2004–05	Genève–Servette HC	NLA	44	4	9	13	39	4	0	0	0	0
2005–06	Genève–Servette HC	NLA	44	6	14	20	34	—	—	—	—	—
2006–07	Genève–Servette HC	NLA	34	5	11	16	36	4	1	0	1	4
2007–08	Genève–Servette HC	NLA	50	5	14	19	36	16	3	5	8	8
2008–09	Genève–Servette HC	NLA	43	7	15	22	79	4	2	1	3	0
2009–10	Genève–Servette HC	NLA	50	19	31	50	44	20	10	15	25	16
2010–11	Genève–Servette HC	NLA	38	9	13	22	14	—	—	—	—	—
2010–11	SC Bern	NLA	4	2	0	2	0	11	2	2	4	2
2011–12	SC Bern	NLA	40	4	11	15	6	13	2	4	6	4
2012–13	SC Bern	NLA	26	1	2	3	2	—	—	—	—	—
2012–13	Lausanne HC	SUI.2	20	6	13	19	2	5	0	0	0	2
2013–14	Lausanne HC	NLA	50	9	10	19	14	6	1	0	1	2
2014–15	Lausanne HC	NLA	36	4	7	11	8	7	0	0	0	4
2015–16	Lausanne HC	NLA	50	7	13	20	6	—	—	—	—	—
2016–17	Lausanne HC	NLA	42	1	6	7	12	4	1	1	2	4
NLA totals			639	88	166	254	346	105	22	28	50	42

=== International ===
Year	Team	Event	GP	G	A	Pts	PIM
2002	Switzerland	WJC	7	0	1	1	2
2006	Switzerland	WC	6	0	1	1	29
2008	Switzerland	WC	7	0	3	3	10
2009	Switzerland	WC	5	0	0	0	0
2010	Switzerland	OG	5	0	0	0	0
2010	Switzerland	WC	7	1	2	3	16
Junior totals			7	0	1	1	2
Senior totals			30	1	6	7	55
