= Dennis LaRue =

American ice hockey official (born 1959)

Dennis LaRue (born July 14, 1959, in Savannah, Georgia) has been a National Hockey League referee since the 1990–91 NHL season, and has worn the uniform number 14 since the 1994–95 NHL season. He was selected to officiate the 1991 Canada Cup and the 2009 Stanley Cup Finals. In December 2009, he was selected as one of 13 referees to officiate at the 2010 Winter Olympics in Vancouver. Dennis spent time in Spokane, Washington as a youth.
