= 2010 IIHF World Championship =

2010 edition of the IIHF World Championship

Tournament details
- Host country: Germany
- Venues: 3 (in 3 host cities)
- Dates: 7–23 May
- Opened by: Horst Köhler
- Teams: 16

Final positions
- Champions: Czech Republic (6th title)
- Runners-up: Russia
- Third place: Sweden
- Fourth place: Germany

Tournament statistics
- Games played: 56
- Goals scored: 277 (4.95 per game)
- Attendance: 548,788 (9,800 per game)
- Scoring leader: (Russia) Ilya Kovalchuk (12 points)

Awards
- MVP: (Germany) Dennis Endras

The 2010 IIHF World Championship was the 74th IIHF World Championship, an annual international ice hockey tournament. It took place between 7 and 23 May 2010 in Germany. The games were played in the Lanxess Arena in Cologne, SAP Arena in Mannheim, and one game at Veltins-Arena in Gelsenkirchen. The Russian team was the defending champion, having won the previous two championships.

The Czech Republic, after an early 2–3 upset loss to Norway in the preliminary round, ultimately claimed their sixth world championship title by defeating defending champions, two years running, Russia, 2–1 in the final. Sweden won against Germany 3–1 for the bronze medal.

Canada, which three months earlier, had won the 2010 Winter Olympics Men's Ice Hockey Gold on home-ice in Vancouver, after beating the Russians 7–3 in the Quarterfinals, had a disappointing tournament. They clinched the last spot in the playoff round and lost their quarterfinal 2–5 in a rematch versus Russia. They finished 7th overall, their second-worst finish in tournament history, after their 1992 8th-place finish.

The tournament stands as the most watched IIHF championship in history, with an estimated cumulative audience of over 650 million over the course of the tournament and viewers in over 100 countries and dependencies worldwide. It also was a considerable success regarding attendance for the tournament; it ranked as the second most attended ice hockey world championship of all time, narrowly behind the 2004 edition. In total 548,788 people attended, compared with 552,097 in 2004 in the Czech Republic. It since slipped to the fourth place, behind 2014 and 2015 editions.

The host nation of Germany had their best finish at the tournament since it switched to the current 16 nation format, and a player representing Germany (goaltender Dennis Endras) was named MVP for the first time in the history of the championship.

== Summary ==
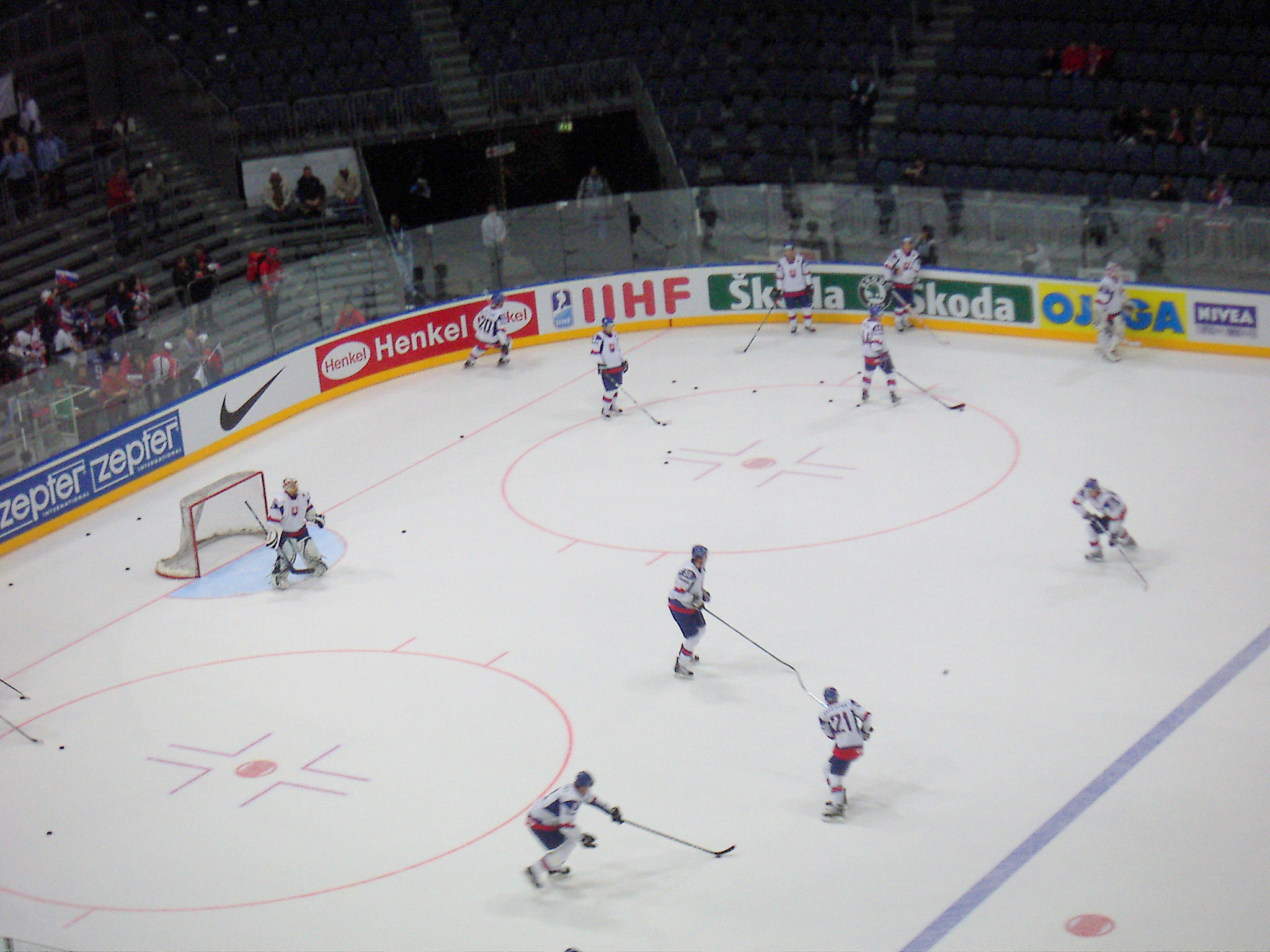
Slovakia warming up prior to facing Belarus in Group A preliminary action

=== Preliminary round ===
Group A saw the higher seeded team win each match, with the exception of the game between Belarus and Slovakia which was won by Slovakia. Russia topped the group with the full nine points, Slovakia qualified in second and Belarus in third. Kazakhstan was sent to the relegation round, after being promoted to the finals tournament for the first time since 2006.

In Group B the higher seeded team won each match, with the exception of the final group match which saw Switzerland defeat the second-seeded Canadians for the first time in the history of the tournament. This upset led to Switzerland winning the group with nine points, followed by Canada in second and Latvia in third. Italy, back at the finals tournament after missing 2009, lost all its matches and was returned to the relegation round.

Group C action ended with three teams having a record of two wins and one defeat. Norway's upset defeat of Czech Republic caused a controversy when Jaromír Jágr, a famous member of the Czech team, spoke out against other Czech stars turning down the tournament. This later triggered an international hockey dispute, when a column was posted on IIHF.com regarding these comments and about players' turning down invitations to attend. This article was later taken down and René Fasel, president of the IIHF, noted his concern. Sweden, the Czech Republic and Norway all moved on to the qualification round, while France was sent to the relegation after failing to win any matches.

In Group D the opening game saw the first major upset. Germany in front of a record crowd of over 77,000 persons defeated the United States in overtime, 2–1. This group proved to be full of upsets; in the next match Denmark beat the fourth-seeded Finns, followed by the Danes defeating the Americans. Finland came up with two wins to top the group and move on to the qualification round, along with Germany in second place and Denmark in third. The final match between the U.S. and Finland determined the United States' last-place finish, and they were sent to the relegation round for the first time since 2003.

=== Qualification round ===
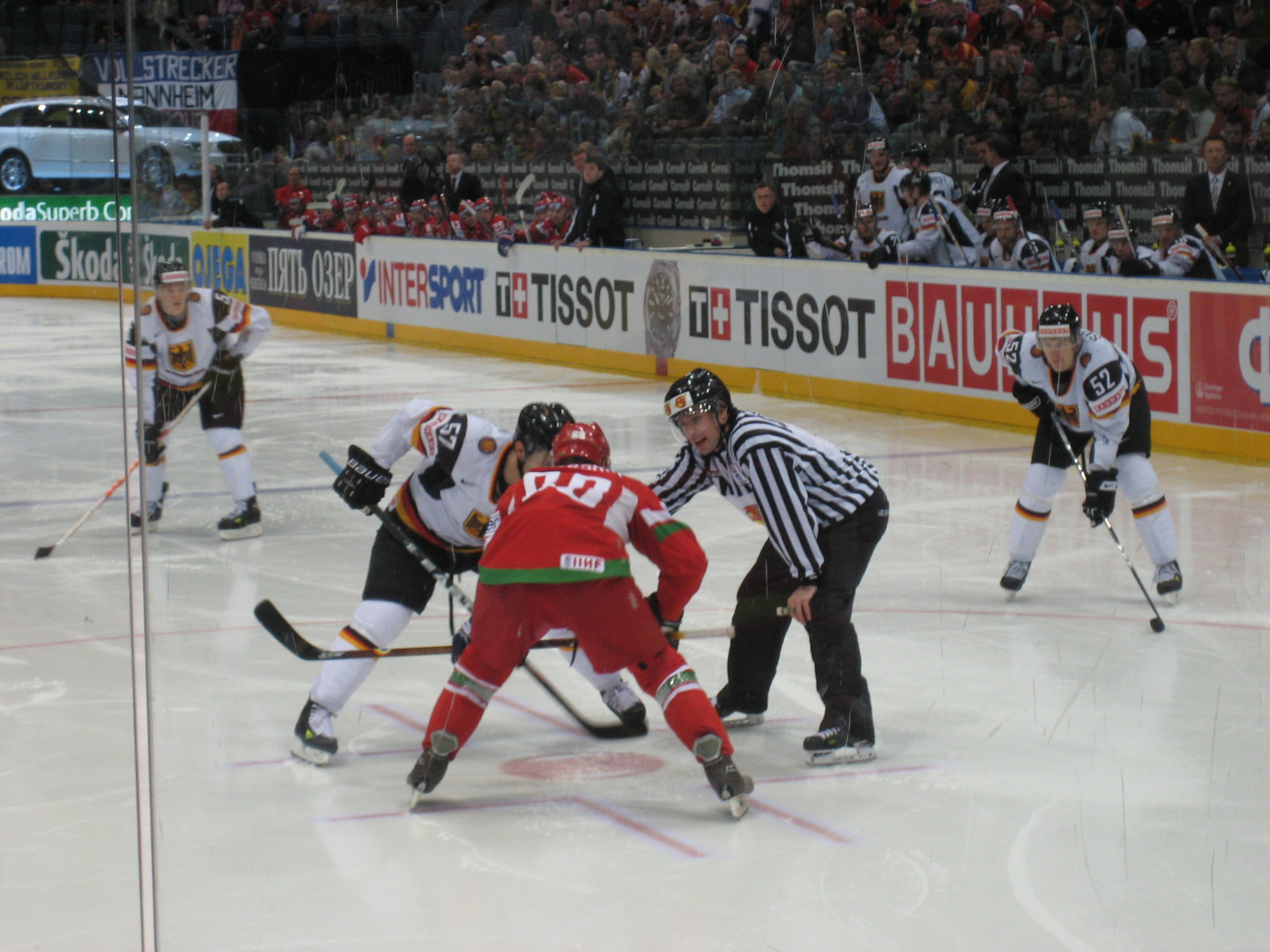
Belarus defeated Germany 2–1 in overtime, in the qualification round.

Group E action first saw Denmark handing favored Slovakia a blowout upset, 6–0. In the next match Finland defeated Belarus, 2–0, after outshooting them 32 to 18. Russia narrowly defeated Germany 3–2, in which Alexander Ovechkin scored the winner. Russia continued with two more wins over Denmark and Finland to propel them to the group win, making them the only team to go undefeated into the playoff round. Belarus defeated Germany in overtime, and then defeated Denmark 2–1, but this was not enough to qualify and they ended in fifth place. In yet another upset, the host Germans defeated Slovakia 2–1 to win a qualifying spot in third place, much to the delight of the German fans and coach Uwe Krupp. Finland finished in second-place after Russia, followed by Germany and Denmark. Denmark managed to qualify for the quarter-finals for the first time in the history of the tournament. Slovakia finished a disappointing last, marking the third straight year in which they did not qualify for the quarter-finals in the lead up to their hosting of the 2011 IIHF World Championship.

Group F opened with Canada flexing its offense against Norway in a 12–1 blowout. Sweden then defeated Latvia 4–2, followed by Switzerland continuing its winning streak with an upset 3–2 win against the Czechs. Latvia defeated Norway but later lost to the Czech Republic, which resulted in their last placement in the group and their failure to qualify. Sweden beat Canada after an impressive performance by Swedish goaltender Jonas Gustavsson. In another upset, Norway managed to beat the in-form Swiss 3–2, but they would end in fifth place. The Czech Republic won against Canada 3–2 to lead them to finish ahead of the Canadians in the group. Sweden capped off the round with a convincing 5–0 win over Switzerland to finish as group winners. Switzerland finished in second after Sweden, followed by the Czech Republic. Canada, somewhat surprisingly as the second seed, grabbed the last qualifying spot in fourth place.

=== Relegation round ===
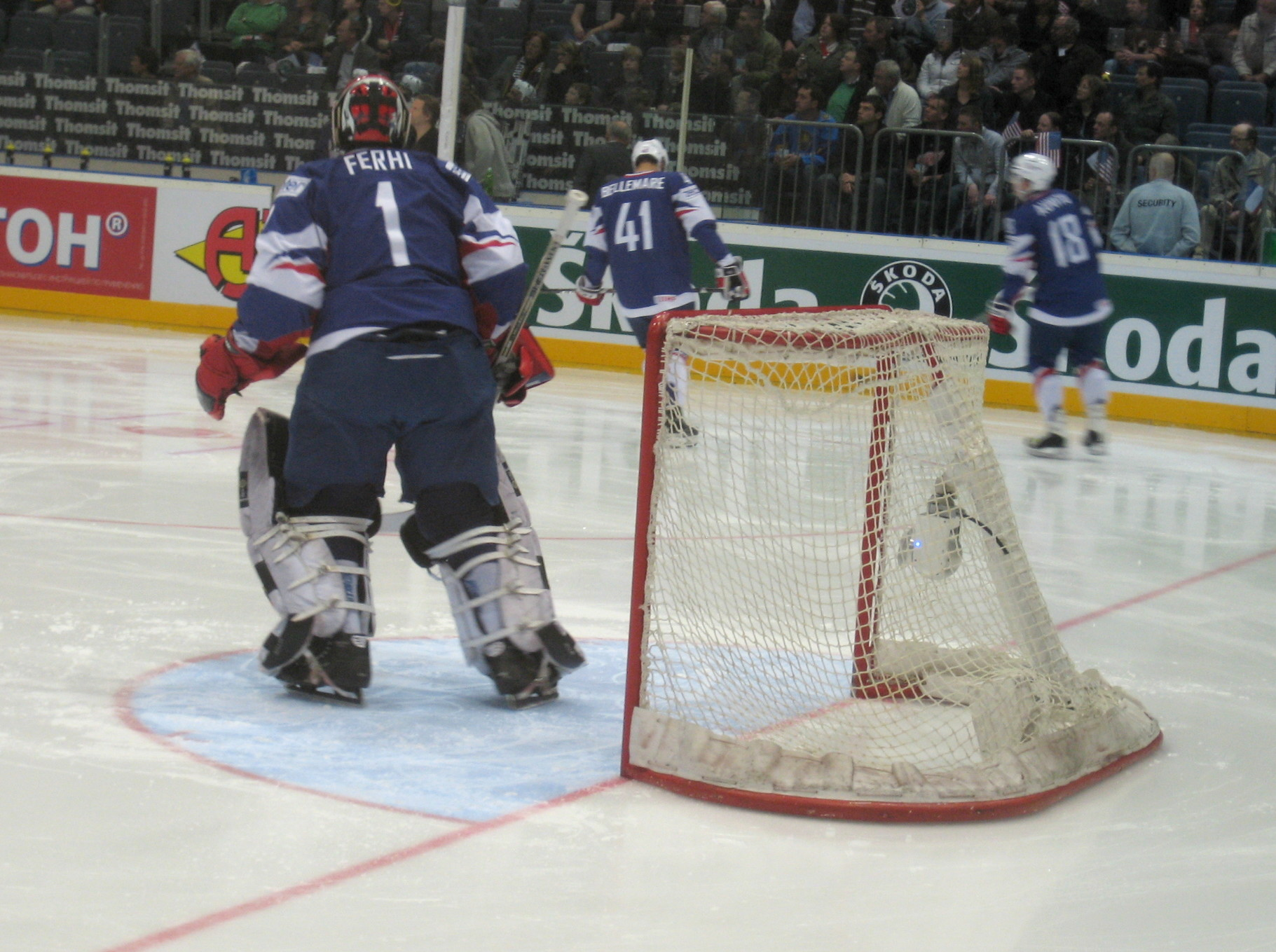
France lost 4–0 to the U.S. in the relegation round

In the relegation round (Group G) the teams from the U.S., France, the newly promoted Italy and Kazakhstan faced each other after they had ended their respective preliminary groups in fourth and last place. The U.S. beat Kazakhstan in the first game 10–0, while France won against Italy in the decisive match for second place. There were no surprises on the second game-day, with the U.S. defeating France and Italy winning against Kazakhstan. The U.S. then defeated Italy in a shootout and France beat Kazakhstan 5–3. The final relegation results saw Kazakhstan and Italy go directly back down to Division I. Group-winners U.S. and second-placed France both qualified for the 2011 World Championships.

=== Playoff round ===
The playoff round saw the top eight teams competing for the title of 2010 world champions. The quarter-finals began with a close match between Finland and the Czech Republic. After Petri Kontiola's early goal in the first minute, the game remained scoreless all the way into the third period. Jakub Klepiš scored the equalizer shortly after the final period started. No further goals were scored, so the game went into a scoreless overtime followed by a shootout. Jan Marek scored the decisive goal to put the Czechs into the semifinals.

In the second quarter-final, Sweden faced Denmark. This was Denmark's first appearance in the playoff round. After Sweden established a comfortable 3–0 lead, the Danes scored a goal in the second period. Seven minutes before the end Linus Omark scored a goal which restored the three-goal lead for Sweden. A late power play goal by Dane Morten Madsen was to no avail and Sweden won 4–2.

The third quarter-final featured a storied and contentious rivalry. Russia played against Canada in a repeat of the quarter-finals at the 2010 Olympics, in which Canada embarrassed the Russians 7–3. The opening period was a dead heat until a late goal by Maxim Afinogenov. Russia, still undefeated at the tournament, immediately overtook Canada in the second period, and led at one point in the third period by 4–0. Ilya Kovalchuk had a three-assist game and was a big boost for the Russians who won 5–2, following two late Canadian goals.

The final quarter-final was an evening game between the host Germany and their traditional rival, Switzerland. The first period was scoreless but not without chances, as the Swiss hit the post twice. Midway through the second period Philip Gogulla scored on the power play to give Germany the lead, and this goal would turn out to be the game winner. The Swiss outshot the Germans 41 to 27, and Dennis Endras is credited with keeping Germany in the game by preserving the one-goal lead. The win put Germany in the semifinals for the first time since 1953 and the match was dubbed by the IIHF as The Miracle at Mannheim. At the end of the match there was a brawl between the teams, which included German assistant coach Ernst Höfner getting into an altercation with Swiss defenceman Timo Helbling. Both were handed match suspensions.

After one day off the semifinals started with Sweden versus the Czech Republic. The first period was equal with both teams scoring one goal. Andreas Engqvist scored midway through the second period to put Sweden up 2–1. This lead held into very late in the third period. With 1:13 left in the third period the Czechs pulled their goalie to get a six on five opportunity and Karel Rachůnek scored the 2–2 equalizer with just 7.5 seconds left, putting the game into overtime. The overtime period stayed scoreless and it came down to the shootout. In a repeat of the quarter-final the Czechs won by a goal from Jan Marek.

The other semifinal between Germany and Russia was a close match, much like their qualification round game. The Germans started off the scoring with a goal from Marcel Goc during a two-man power play. At the midway point of the match Evgeni Malkin scored to tie up the game for the Russians. The remainder of the game was very close, and the tie was only broken with 1:50 minutes left, when Pavel Datsyuk scored the game-winning goal. The Germans pressed in the final minutes but the score held for a 2–1 Russian victory, putting them in the final for the third straight year.

The bronze medal game was between Sweden and the surprise semifinalists, hosts Germany. Magnus Pääjärvi-Svensson scored an early goal to put up Sweden 1–0. The game then went scoreless until late in the second period when on a 4–3 rush Alexander Barta managed to retrieve his own rebound and put it top-shelf past Jonas Gustavsson, tying up the game for Germany. Early in the third period Jonas Andersson fired a shot from a very tight angle which managed to beat Dennis Endras on the five hole. The score held until Andersson netted an empty-net goal to ensure Sweden's 3–1 victory, giving them their second straight bronze medal at the worlds.

=== Final ===
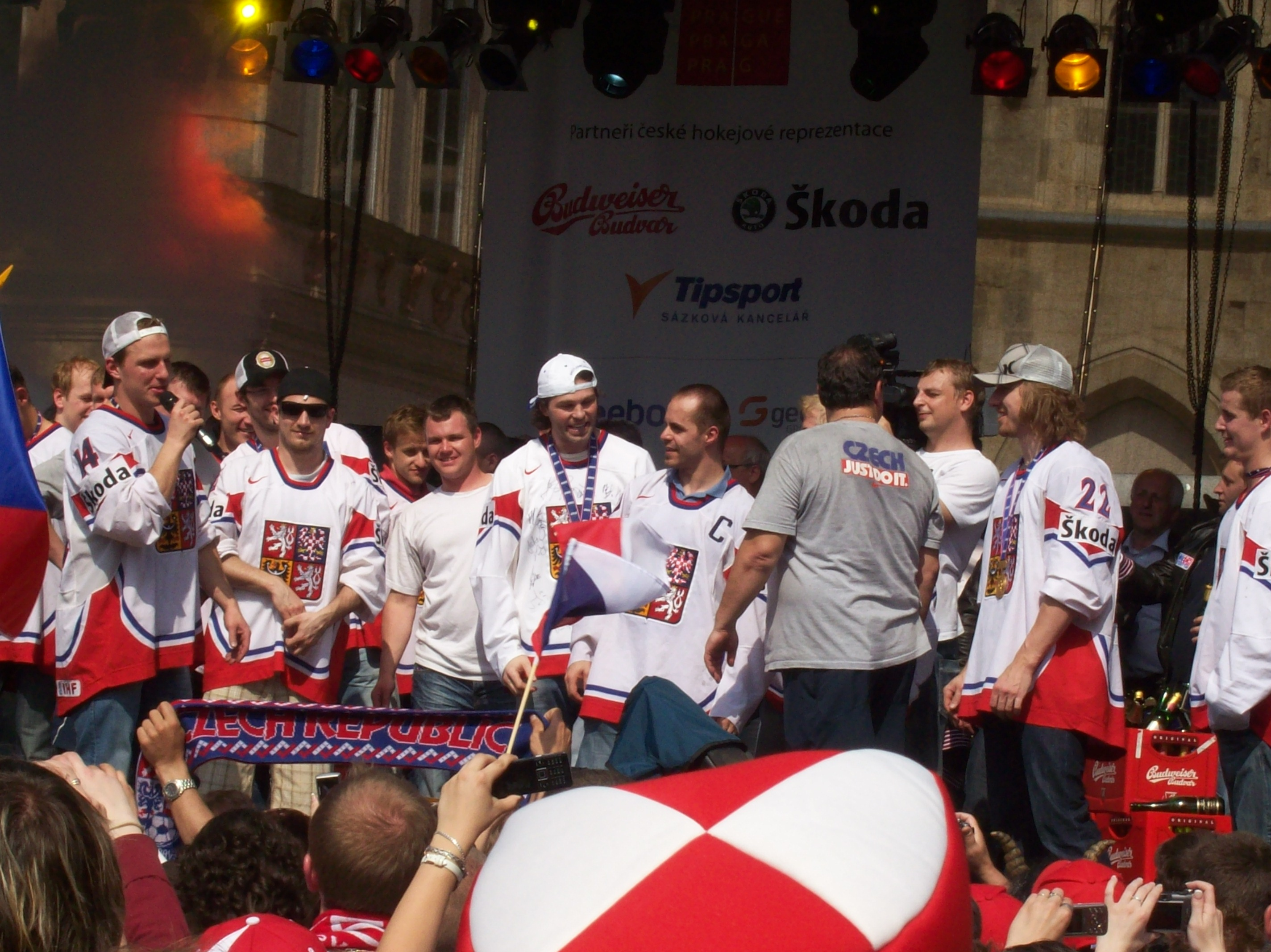
Arrival of the champion Czech team in Old Town Square, Prague for celebrations

The final was played between Russia and the Czech Republic for the first time in the history of the tournament, although the predecessors of both these nations, the USSR and Czechoslovakia, had met several times in the 1960s, 70s, and 80s. It was Russia's third consecutive finals appearance, and the Czech Republic's first appearance since 2006.

The match began with a goal after just 20 seconds, scored by Jakub Klepiš from a pass by Jaromír Jágr. The goal was seemingly the result of a defensive mistake which led to a Czech offensive possession with Russian defensemen out of position. For the remainder of the period the Russians held almost complete possession of the puck, and veteran Sergei Fedorov hit the post after an odd man rush. Very late in the period the Russians put the puck in the net on a power play, but it was determined to be after the clock had run out and was ruled as no goal. There was some brief confusion however, as the buzzer sounds after the clock on the scoreboard runs out.

In the second period Russia pressed once again but the Czech Republic slowed the game down and forced Russia to regroup, resulting in an error in the Russian defensive zone when Alexander Ovechkin collided with teammate Fedorov. This led to a 3-on-2 rush for the Czechs and Karel Rachůnek centered the puck while Tomáš Rolinek crashed the net. The puck was redirected off Rolinek's skates, and it was ruled a good goal because there was no kicking motion visible.

The third period began with more Russian pressure, including a close chance off the post by Evgeni Malkin, but at the midway point of the period Russian Alexei Emelin was given a five-minute major and thrown out of the game for clipping Jaromír Jágr, who did not return for the remainder of the game. This was followed by more penalty trouble for both teams. In the final minutes after pulling goaltender Semyon Varlamov, Pavel Datsyuk buried a goal on a 5-on-3 with 35 seconds left, bringing Russia within one goal of the Czechs. Under pressure the Czech goalie Tomáš Vokoun managed to stave off the final Russian assault and the Czechs held on to win the game 2–1.

The president of the Czech Republic Václav Klaus handed out the gold medals alongside IIHF president René Fasel.

== Rosters ==
Each team's roster for the 2010 IIHF World Championship consisted of at least 15 skaters (forwards, and defencemen) and two goaltenders, and at most 20 skaters and three goaltenders. All sixteen participating nations, through the confirmation of their respective national associations, had to submit a roster by the first IIHF directorate meeting on 6 May 2010.

== Host selection ==
Four nations, all located in Europe placed formal bids to host the 2010 IIHF World Championship. Those nations were:

- Belarus
- Germany
- Slovakia
- Sweden

Slovakia and Sweden withdrew from bidding before voting began in order to apply for the 2011 World Championship. All four nations to bid on the 2010 World Championship later received winning bids. Slovakia won the bid to host the 2011 IIHF World Championship, Sweden won its bid to host in 2012, but this decision was later switched to be the joint host of the 2012, and 2013 IIHF World Championship editions (both with Finland), and Belarus to host the 2014 IIHF World Championship.

After one round of voting, the winning bid was announced by IIHF president René Fasel on 15 May 2005, from Zürich, Switzerland. Belarus' bidding cities Minsk and Zhodzina received 18 votes to Germany's 89, thus finalizing Germany's successful bid.

Voting results
Country	Votes
Germany	89
Belarus	18

- Slovakia withdrew from the 2010 bid prior to the start of the congress, postponed 2011
- Sweden withdrew immediately prior to the start of the voting, postponed 2011

== Promotions ==
=== Official song ===
The official song of the tournament is "Stuck on Replay" by the German electronic dance band Scooter. It is the fourth single from their album Under the Radar Over the Top. It was released on 12 March 2010, on the day of the Hamburg concert, the biggest show of their Under the Radar Over the Top tour.

=== Mascot ===
Urmel on Ice

Urmel on Ice (German: Urmel auf dem Eis) is the official mascot of the tournament. A character created by Max Kruse and known by the German public from the Augsburger Puppenkiste and the Impy's Island (Urmel aus dem Eis (English: Urmel from the ice)) film was previously the mascot of the Deutsche Eishockey-Bund and the German national team. He wears number 10 on his jersey.

=== Motto ===
The official motto of the tournament was unveiled on 2 September 2009, in Lanxess Arena and is "Germany on Ice" (German: Deutschland auf Eis).

=== Ambassadors ===
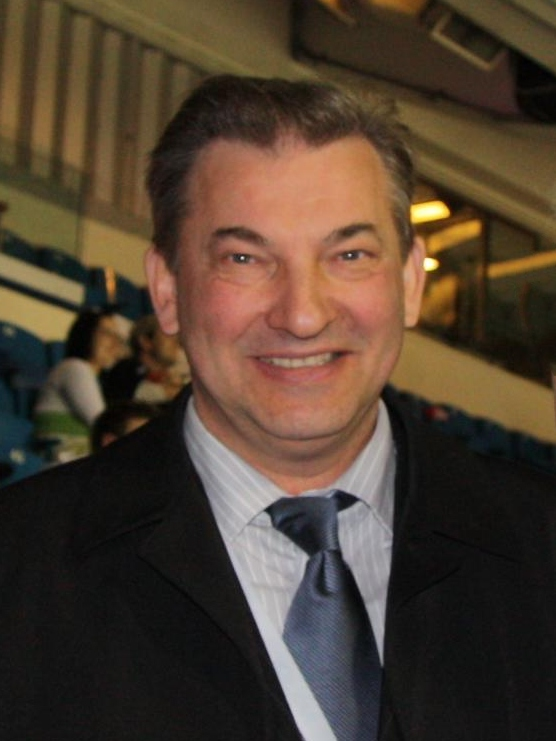
Vladislav Tretiak, one of the official ambassadors.

The World Championship Ambassadors for 2010 included; Canadian legend Wayne Gretzky, Soviet ice hockey goaltender and ten time World champion Vladislav Tretiak, and "Germany's ice hockey player of the century" Erich Kühnhackl. They are all members of the IIHF Hall of Fame, and have all played in the IIHF World Championship previously. They were special members, alongside; Zdeno Chára, Peter Forsberg, Sergei Kostitsyn, Jari Kurri, Kim Martin, Mark Streit, Hayley Wickenheiser and Henrik Zetterberg, of a campaign called "The Green Puck campaign", which was an anti-doping initiative in association with the World Anti-Doping Agency.

== Venues ==
2010 IIHF World Championship is located in Germany	Cologne	Mannheim	Gelsenkirchen
2010 IIHF World Championship is located in Germany	Lanxess Arena; Capacity: 18,500	SAP Arena; Capacity: 13,600	Veltins-Arena; Capacity: 76,152

=== Attendance world record ===
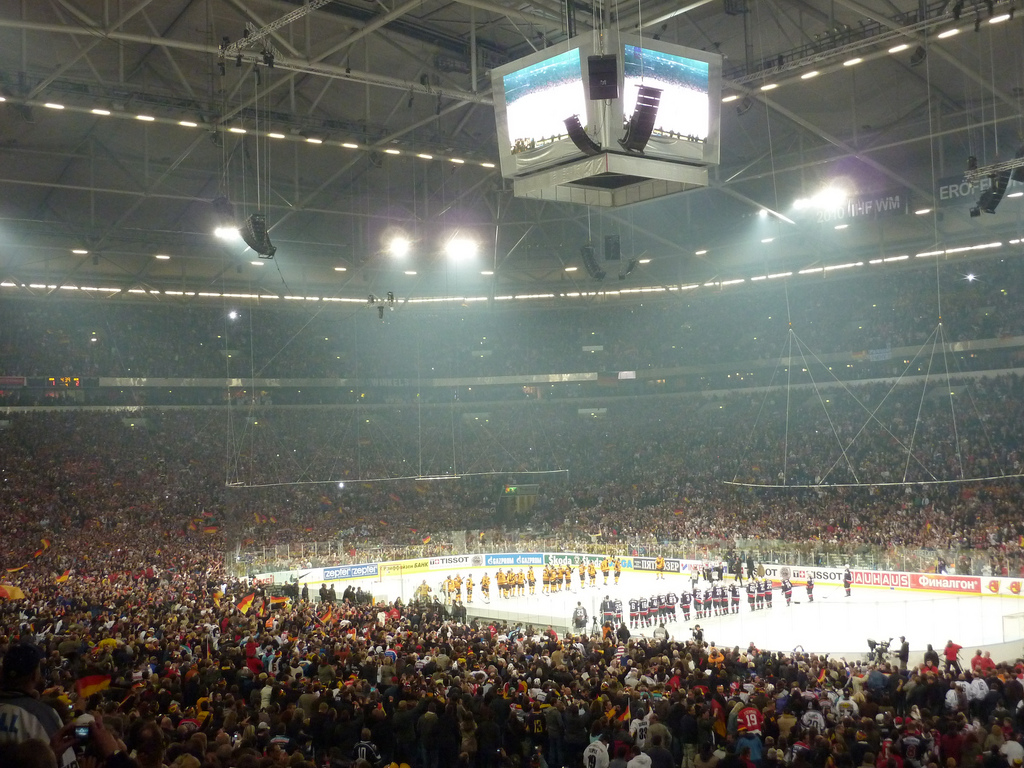
Veltins-Arena during the opening game of the 2010 IIHF World Championship, which was attended by 77,803 people.

The opening game of the 74th IIHF World Championship took place at Veltins-Arena in Gelsenkirchen on 7 May between Germany and the United States. On this occasion, the stadium's planned configuration would allow for a capacity of 76,152. This figure is higher than the past ice hockey attendance World Record held by Michigan State University, which was 74,554.

It was announced at the second intermission by Guinness World Records spokesman Christian Teufe, that not only had the Gelsenkirchen game passed the world record, but had exceeded it by over 3,000 individuals. The official attendance according to the IIHF, and confirmed by the Guinness World records, was 77,803. Both Eric Nystrom and David Moss, who were playing for the United States, had also played in the Michigan State game in 2001, making them the only people to have played both world record games.

The noise inside the stadium was considerably loud, due to the German ice hockey chants, whistles and drums, which according to Ryan Carter of Team USA left the Americans frustrated at the inability to communicate. Carter also said that the "crowd was definitely the seventh man in this game for Germany". Also notable about the game was that it was the first time in over 17 years of international hockey competition that Germany had defeated the United States, with Felix Schütz scoring the game winner in overtime, on Scott Clemmensen, for a 2–1 final score. The previous win was on 25 April 1993, also in Germany in Dortmund, during the 1993 World Championship when Germany beat the United States 6–3.

The President of Germany, Horst Köhler, along with other politicians were present for the match.

The overall attendance record was broken in December 2010 by The Big Chill at the Big House, though the crowd still remains the largest ever for an indoor hockey game.

== Nations ==
The following 16 nations qualified for the elite-pool tournament. One nation from Asia, 13 nations from Europe, and two nations from North America were represented.

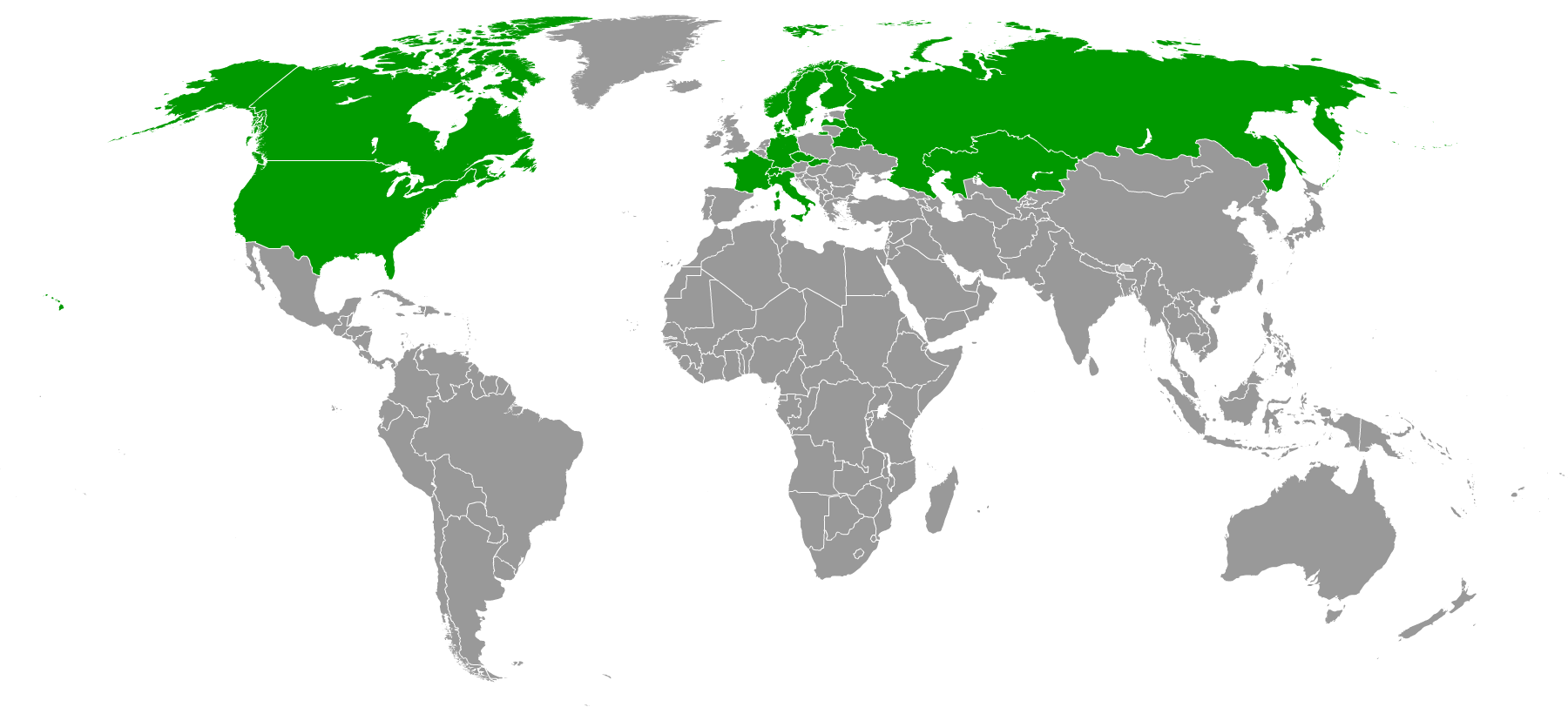
Qualified nations in the 2010 IIHF World Championship, in Germany.

Asia

- Kazakhstan (Note: Qualified through winning a promotion at the 2009 IIHF World Championship Division I)

Europe

- Belarus (Note: Automatic qualifier after a top 13 placement at the 2009 IIHF World Championship)
- Czech Republic
- Denmark
- Finland
- France
- Germany (Note: Qualified as hosts)
- Italy
- Latvia
- Norway
- Russia
- Slovakia
- Sweden
- Switzerland

North America

- Canada
- United States

== Seeding and grouping ==
The seeding in the preliminary round was based on the 2009 IIHF World Ranking, which ends at the conclusion of the 2009 IIHF World Championship. The 2010 Olympics were therefore not included. The teams were grouped by seeding (in parentheses is the corresponding world ranking):

Group A

- Russia (1)
- Belarus (8)
- Slovakia (9)
- Kazakhstan (18)

Group B

- Canada (2)
- Switzerland (7)
- Latvia (10)
- Italy (15)

Group C

- Sweden (3)
- Czech Republic (6)
- Norway (11)
- France (14)

Group D

- Finland (4)
- United States (5)
- Germany (12)
- Denmark (13)

== Preliminary round ==
Sixteen participating teams were placed in the following four groups. After playing a round-robin, the top three teams in each group advanced to the qualifying round. The last team in each group competes in the relegation round.

Groups A and D were played in Cologne, with one game in Gelsenkirchen, and groups B and C were played in Mannheim.

=== Group A ===
Pos	Team	Pld	W	OTW	OTL	L	GF	GA	GD	Pts	Qualification
1	Russia	3	3	0	0	0	10	3	+7	9	Qualifying round
2	Slovakia	3	2	0	0	1	10	6	+4	6	Qualifying round
3	Belarus	3	1	0	0	2	8	9	−1	3	Qualifying round
4	Kazakhstan	3	0	0	0	3	4	14	−10	0	Relegation Round

Source: IIHF

All times are local (UTC+2).

9 May 2010; 16:15	Belarus	5–2 (0–0, 2–2, 3–0)	Kazakhstan	Lanxess Arena, Cologne; Attendance: 6,125

Game reference

Vitali Koval
Goalies
Vitaliy Yeremeyev
Referees:
(Norway) Ole Hansen
(United States) Rick Looker

	0–1	20:17 – D. Dudarev (K. Shafranov)
	0–2	30:30 – V. Antipin (A. Koreshkov, A. Gavrilin)
D. Meleshko (M. Grabovski, R. Salei) – 32:09	1–2
M. Stefanovich (E. Kovryshin) – 33:39	2–2
A. Kalyuzhny (N. Stasenko) – 44:21	3–2
R. Salei (A. Kalyuzhny) – 50:14	4–2
S. Demagin (D. Meleshko, V. Kostyuchenok) – 58:20	5–2

10 min
Penalties
12 min
26
Shots
23

9 May 2010; 20:15	Slovakia	1–3 (0–1, 0–1, 1–1)	Russia	Lanxess Arena, Cologne; Attendance: 18,522

Game reference

Peter Budaj
Goalies
Vasiliy Koshechkin
Referees:
(Canada) Marc Muylaert
(Sweden) Patrik Sjöberg

	0–1	14:51 – M. Afinogenov (V. Kozlov, N. Kulemin)
	0–2	29:23 – A. Ovechkin (S. Fedorov)
I. Majeský (M. Bartovič) – 43:51	1–2
	1–3	59:06 – V. Kozlov (ENG)

8 min
Penalties
8 min
33
Shots
34

11 May 2010; 16:15	Russia	4–1 (1–0, 2–0, 1–1)	Kazakhstan	Lanxess Arena, Cologne; Attendance: 9,274

Game reference

Alexander Eremenko
Goalies
Vitaliy Yeremeyev
Referees:
(United States) Rick Looker
(Czech Republic) Milan Minář

A. Ovechkin (A. Semin, S. Fedorov) – 10:20 (PP)	1–0
I. Kovalchuk (A. Semin) – 20:42	2–0
A. Semin – 37:55	3–0
D. Grebeshkov (M. Afinogenov, N. Kulemin) – 43:22	4–0
	4–1	57:59 – D. Dudarev (K. Shafranov)

6 min
Penalties
10 min
29
Shots
19

11 May 2010; 20:15	Belarus	2–4 (2–0, 0–2, 0–2)	Slovakia	Lanxess Arena, Cologne; Attendance: 8,862

Game reference

Vitali Koval
Goalies
Peter Budaj
Referees:
(Sweden) Christer Larking
(Canada) Chris Savage

S. Demagin (A. Stas, D. Meleshko) – 4:29	1–0
A. Kalyuzhny (A. Stas, D. Meleshko) – 9:03	2–0
	2–1	22:42 – I. Čiernik (R. Lintner) (PP)
	2–2	30:07 – M. Bartovič (R. Pánik, R. Lintner)
	2–3	44:07 – M. Zagrapan (A. Sekera) (PP)
	2–4	59:06 – M. Bartovič (R. Pánik, A. Podkonický)

12 min
Penalties
8 min
20
Shots
24

13 May 2010; 16:15	Russia	3–1 (1–0, 2–0, 0–1)	Belarus	Lanxess Arena, Cologne; Attendance: 17,540

Game reference

Semyon Varlamov
Goalies
Andrei Mezin
Referees:
(Norway) Ole Hansen
(Canada) Marc Muylaert

S. Mozyakin (M. Sushinski, I. Nikulin) – 10:45 (PP)	1–0
A. Ovechkin (S. Fedorov) – 32:21	2–0
A. Anisimov (S. Mozyakin, V. Atyushov) – 34:03	3–0
	3–1	47:30 – A. Kalyuzhny (A. Ugarov)

6 min
Penalties
8 min
38
Shots
20

13 May 2010; 20:15	Kazakhstan	1–5 (0–1, 0–2, 1–2)	Slovakia	Lanxess Arena, Cologne; Attendance: 13,556

Game reference

Vitaliy Yeremeyev
Goalies
Peter Budaj
Referees:
(Czech Republic) Vladimír Šindler
(Sweden) Patrik Sjöberg

	0–1	16:30 – M. Zagrapan (A. Sekera, I. Majeský)
	0–2	25:04 – I. Čiernik (M. Svatoš)
	0–3	33:52 – I. Čiernik (R. Lintner)
D. Dudarev (A. Koledayev) – 44:03	1–3
	1–4	54:18 – T. Tatar (PS)
	1–5	58:05 – A. Podkonický (P. Frühauf, T. Starosta)

8 min
Penalties
6 min
36
Shots
37

=== Group B ===
Pos	Team	Pld	W	OTW	OTL	L	GF	GA	GD	Pts	Qualification
1	Switzerland	3	3	0	0	0	10	2	+8	9	Qualifying round
2	Canada	3	2	0	0	1	12	6	+6	6	Qualifying round
3	Latvia	3	1	0	0	2	7	11	−4	3	Qualifying round
4	Italy	3	0	0	0	3	3	13	−10	0	Relegation Round

Source: IIHF

All times are local (UTC+2).

8 May 2010; 16:15	Canada	5–1 (2–1, 2–0, 1–0)	Italy	SAP Arena, Mannheim; Attendance: 7,912

Game reference

Chris Mason
Goalies
Adam Russo
Daniel Bellissimo
Referees:
(Slovakia) Vladimír Baluška
(Slovakia) Daniel Konc

C. Perry (S. Stamkos, R. Bourque) – 2:43	1–0
	1–1	12:44 – M. Strazzabosco (N. Plastino, J. Parco)
K. Russell (R. Whitney) – 19:12	2–1
M. Duchene (R. Whitney, B. Burns) – 25:27	3–1
S. Stamkos (M. Duchene, K. Cumiskey) – 30:37	4–1
R. Bourque (T. Myers) – 57:19	5–1

12 min
Penalties
18 min
45
Shots
24

8 May 2010; 20:15	Switzerland	3–1 (1–0, 1–0, 1–1)	Latvia	SAP Arena, Mannheim; Attendance: 7,089

Game reference

Martin Gerber
Goalies
Edgars Masaļskis
Referees:
(Finland) Tom Laaksonen
(United States) Thomas Stearns

A. Ambühl (D. Brunner, T. Monnet) – 2:26	1–0
R. Josi – 22:28	2–0
	2–1	42:35 – G. Meija (J. Štāls, J. Rēdlihs)
I. Rüthemann (ENG) – 59:58	3–1

6 min
Penalties
6 min
31
Shots
22

10 May 2010; 16:15	Switzerland	3–0 (0–0, 1–0, 2–0)	Italy	SAP Arena, Mannheim; Attendance: 5,971

Game reference

Martin Gerber
Goalies
Daniel Bellissimo
Referees:
(Russia) Rafail Kadyrov
(Germany) Daniel Piechaczek

T. Monnet (M. Seger) – 21:20	1–0
D. Brunner (P. Savary, R. Josi) – 46:39 (PP)	2–0
M. Plüss – 59:44 (ENG)	3–0

10 min
Penalties
10 min
52
Shots
15

10 May 2010; 20:15	Latvia	1–6 (0–2, 0–4, 1–0)	Canada	SAP Arena, Mannheim; Attendance: 5,501

Game reference

Edgars Masaļskis
Mārtiņš Raitums
Goalies
Chris Mason
Chad Johnson
Referees:
(Slovakia) Daniel Konc
(Russia) Konstantin Olenin

	0–1	1:59 – J. Tavares (K. Russell, C. Perry) (PP)
	0–2	18:19 – S. Stamkos (K. Russell, C. Perry) (PP)
	0–3	25:30 – M. Giordano (R. Whitney, K. Cumiskey) (PP)
	0–4	26:58 – J. Tavares (C. Perry) (PP)
	0–5	30:07 – S. Downie (B. Burns)
	0–6	39:06 – M. Giordano (E. Kane, R. Peverley)
G. Pujacs (J. Štāls, G. Meija) – 50:25	1–6

14 min
Penalties
18 min
24
Shots
32

12 May 2010; 16:15	Italy	2–5 (1–1, 0–1, 1–3)	Latvia	SAP Arena, Mannheim; Attendance: 4,029

Game reference

Adam Russo
Goalies
Edgars Masaļskis
Referees:
(Slovakia) Vladimír Baluška
(Finland) Jari Levonen

	0–1	0:50 – K. Daugaviņš (J. Sprukts)
M. De Marchi (M. Souza) – 14:45	1–1
	1–2	28:26 – A. Ņiživijs (H. Vasiļjevs, G. Pujacs)
	1–3	41:56 – A. Reķis (G. Pujacs, A. Ņiživijs)
G. Scandella – 43:28 (PP)	2–3
	2–4	57:13 – K. Daugaviņš (M. Karsums)
	2–5	59:09 – M. Karsums (M. Cipulis) (ENG)

12 min
Penalties
8 min
26
Shots
38

12 May 2010; 20:15	Canada	1–4 (1–2, 0–1, 0–1)	Switzerland	SAP Arena, Mannheim; Attendance: 12,500

Game reference

Chris Mason
Goalies
Tobias Stephan
Referees:
(Finland) Tom Laaksonen
(United States) Thomas Sterns

	0–1	11:47 – I. Rüthemann (T. Déruns, M. Plüss)
	0–2	14:03 – M. Plüss (T. Déruns, I. Rüthemann)
J. Tavares (M. Duchene, R. Whitney) – 14:29	1–2
	1–3	21:38 – A. Ambuhl (K. Romy, R. Josi)
	1–4	45:29 – T. Déruns (M. Plüss, I. Rüthemann)

4 min
Penalties
10 min
32
Shots
18

=== Group C ===
Pos	Team	Pld	W	OTW	OTL	L	GF	GA	GD	Pts	Qualification
1	Sweden	3	2	0	0	1	9	6	+3	6	Qualifying round
2	Czech Republic	3	2	0	0	1	10	6	+4	6	Qualifying round
3	Norway	3	2	0	0	1	10	8	+2	6	Qualifying round
4	France	3	0	0	0	3	5	14	−9	0	Relegation Round

Source: IIHF

All times are local (UTC+2).

9 May 2010; 16:15	Czech Republic	6–2 (2–0, 2–0, 2–2)	France	SAP Arena, Mannheim; Attendance: 3,132

Game reference

Tomáš Vokoun
Goalies
Fabrice Lhenry
Referees:
(Finland) Jari Levonen
(Russia) Konstantin Olenin

P. Hubáček (J. Jágr) – 0:44	1–0
J. Novotný (F. Novak) (PP) – 11:43	2–0
P. Gřegořek (J. Novotný) – 23:23	3–0
K. Rachůnek (J. Klepiš, J. Jágr) (PP) – 25:07	4–0
L. Kašpar (J. Novotný, P. Vampola) – 46:06	5–0
	5–1	46:27 – Y. Treille (L. Meunier)
	5–2	48:37 – L. Meunier (S. Treille, L. Tardif)
M. Blaťák (J. Klepiš, J. Jágr) (PP) – 59:27	6–2

8 min
Penalties
18 min
41
Shots
22

9 May 2010; 20:15	Norway	2–5 (0–2, 1–0, 1–3)	Sweden	SAP Arena, Mannheim; Attendance: 5,022

Game reference

Pål Grotnes
Goalies
Jonas Gustavsson
Referees:
(Russia) Rafail Kadyrov
(Germany) Daniel Piechaczek

	0–1	6:43 – M. Weinhandl (M. Pääjärvi-Svensson)
	0–2	12:45 – E. Karlsson (R. Wallin) (PP)
P. Thoresen (A. Fredriksen, J. Holøs) (PP) – 20:20	1–2
H. Solberg (A. Fredriksen, P. Thoresen) – 44:57	2–2
	2–3	47:08 – M. Weinhandl (M. Pääjärvi-Svensson)
	2–4	54:31 – M. Pääjärvi-Svensson (R. Wallin)
	2–5	57:43 – M. Weinhandl (A. Engqvist) (PP)

10 min
Penalties
14 min
21
Shots
44

11 May 2010; 16:15	Czech Republic	2–3 (0–1, 1–1, 1–1)	Norway	SAP Arena, Mannheim; Attendance: 2,256

Game reference

Ondřej Pavelec
Goalies
Pål Grotnes
Referees:
(Finland) Tom Laaksonen
(United States) Thomas Sterns

	0–1	12:09 – M. Zuccarello Aasen (P. Thoresen, T. Jakobsen)
J. Jágr (M. Rozsíval, J. Klepiš) – 27:56 (PP2)	1–1
	1–2	30:13 –A. Fredriksen (L. Østli, P. Thoresen)
	1–3	44:23 –A. Bastiansen (M. Olimb, L. Spets)
J. Jágr (K. Rachůnek) – 53:09	2–3

12 min
Penalties
22 min
46
Shots
15

11 May 2010; 20:15	Sweden	3–2 (1–0, 2–0, 0–2)	France	SAP Arena, Mannheim; Attendance: 3,268

Game reference

Jacob Markström
Goalies
Eddy Ferhi
Fabrice Lhenry
Referees:
(Slovakia) Vladimír Baluška
(Finland) Jari Levonen

C. Gunnarsson (L. Omark, N. Persson) – 17:49	1–0
J. Andersson (M. Nylander) – 22:34	2–0
J. Harju (L. Omark, C. Bäckman) – 27:44	3–0
	3–1	44:34 – Y. Treille
	3–2	54:05 – L. Tardif (S. Da Costa, B. Amar)

6 min
Penalties
6 min
45
Shots
23

13 May 2010; 16:15	France	1–5 (1–0, 0–1, 0–4)	Norway	SAP Arena, Mannheim; Attendance: 4,403

Game reference

Fabrice Lhenry
Goalies
Pål Grotnes
Ruben Smith
Referees:
(Slovakia) Daniel Konc
(Germany) Daniel Piechaczek

S. Da Costa (J. Auvitu) – 12:49 (PP)	1–0
	1–1	32:02 – P. Lorentzen (M. Røymark, K. Forsberg)
	1–2	42:34 – M. Zuccarello Aasen (P. Thoresen, L. Østli) (PP)
	1–3	47:19 – A. Bastiansen
	1–4	48:42 – P. Thoresen (M. Aasen)
	1–5	56:57 – M. Olimb (PS)

36 min
Penalties
56 min
27
Shots
40

13 May 2010; 20:15	Sweden	1–2 (0–1, 1–1, 0–0)	Czech Republic	SAP Arena, Mannheim; Attendance: 12,500

Game reference

Jonas Gustavsson
Goalies
Tomáš Vokoun
Referees:
(Russia) Rafail Kadyrov
(Russia) Konstantin Olenin

	0–1	0:54 – T. Rolinek (SH)
M. Pääjärvi-Svensson (R. Wallin) – 24:03	1–1
	1–2	29:18 – P. Hubáček (J. Novotný, T. Vokoun)

16 min
Penalties
12 min
32
Shots
37

=== Group D ===
Pos	Team	Pld	W	OTW	OTL	L	GF	GA	GD	Pts	Qualification
1	Finland	3	2	0	0	1	5	6	−1	6	Qualifying round
2	Germany	3	1	1	0	1	5	3	+2	5	Qualifying round
3	Denmark	3	1	1	0	1	7	5	+2	5	Qualifying round
4	United States	3	0	0	2	1	4	7	−3	2	Relegation Round

Source: IIHF

All times are local (UTC+2).

7 May 2010; 20:15	United States	1–2 OT (0–0, 0–1, 1–0) (OT: 0–1)	Germany	Veltins-Arena, Gelsenkirchen; Attendance: 77,803

Game reference

Scott Clemmensen
Goalies
Dennis Endras
Referees:
(Sweden) Christer Lärking
(Canada) Chris Savage

	0–1	25:20 – M. Wolf (M. Müller, C. Ullmann)
R. Carter – 48:28	1–1
	1–2	60:21 – F. Schütz (OT)

8 min
Penalties
8 min
32
Shots
20

8 May 2010; 20:15	Finland	1–4 (1–2, 0–1, 0–1)	Denmark	Lanxess Arena, Cologne; Attendance: 11,452

Game reference

Pekka Rinne
Goalies
Frederik Andersen
Referees:
(United States) Rick Looker
(Czech Republic) Milan Minář

	0–1	2:20 – F. Nielsen (K. Staal, J. Jakobsen)
	0–2	5:19 – P. Regin (K. Degn)
P. Kontiola (J. Aaltonen, P. Nummelin) – 6:47	1–2
	1–3	21:19 – J. Jakobsen (T. Dresler)
	1–4	59:13 – F. Nielsen (ENG)

2 min
Penalties
14 min
37
Shots
17

10 May 2010; 16:15	United States	1–2 OT (0–0, 1–1, 0–0) (OT: 0–1)	Denmark	Lanxess Arena, Cologne; Attendance: 8,985

Game reference

Scott Clemmensen
Goalies
Patrick Galbraith
Referees:
(Norway) Ole Hansen
(Czech Republic) Vladimír Šindler

	0–1	28:52 – L. Eller (F. Nielsen, P. Regin)
K. Yandle (K. Okposo, J. Johnson) – 32:03 (PP)	1–1
	1–2	62:04 – S. Lassen (OT)

8 min
Penalties
10 min
31
Shots
29

10 May 2010; 20:15	Germany	0–1 (0–0, 0–1, 0–0)	Finland	Lanxess Arena, Cologne; Attendance: 18,654

Game reference
Rob Zepp	Goalies	Petri Vehanen	Referees: (Sweden) Christer Larking (Sweden) Patrik Sjöberg
0–1 / 25:18 – J. Immonen (J. Jokinen)			Referees: (Sweden) Christer Larking (Sweden) Patrik Sjöberg
8 min	Penalties	6 min	Referees: (Sweden) Christer Larking (Sweden) Patrik Sjöberg
28	Shots	37	Referees: (Sweden) Christer Larking (Sweden) Patrik Sjöberg

12 May 2010; 16:15	Denmark	1–3 (1–1, 0–2, 0–0)	Germany	Lanxess Arena, Cologne; Attendance: 18,623

Game reference

Patrick Galbraith
Goalies
Dennis Endras
Referees:
(Canada) Marc Muylaert
(Canada) Chris Savage

P. Larsen (P. Regin, J. Damgaard) – 3:40 (PP2)	1–0
	1–1	8:40 – M. Goc (A. Sulzer) (PP)
	1–2	33:28 – F. Schütz (J. Krueger)
	1–3	35:09 – N. Goc

14 min
Penalties
12 min
24
Shots
30

12 May 2010; 20:15	Finland	3–2 (0–1, 1–0, 2–1)	United States	Lanxess Arena, Cologne; Attendance: 17,633

Game reference

Petri Vehanen
Goalies
Scott Clemmensen
Referees:
(Czech Republic) Milan Minář
(Czech Republic) Vladimír Šindler

	0–1	3:30 – D. Moss (J. Johnson, C. Kreider)
L. Komarov (J. Immonen, P. Puistola) – 35:52	1–1
P. Nummelin (M. Mäenpää) (PP) – 40:18	2–1
S. Kapanen (P. Nummelin, J. Aaltonen) – 57:58	3–1
	3–2	59:43 – T. Oshie (K. Yandle) (SH)

2 min
Penalties
6 min
43
Shots
22

== Qualification round ==
The top three teams from each group of the preliminary round advanced to the qualifying round. They were placed into two groups: teams from Groups A and D were placed into Group E, while teams from Groups B and C were placed into Group F.

Every team kept the points from preliminary round matches against teams who also advanced. The teams played a single round robin, but did not play against teams which they had already met in preliminary groups.

The top four teams in both groups E and F advanced to the playoff round.

=== Group E ===
Pos	Team	Pld	W	OTW	OTL	L	GF	GA	GD	Pts	Qualification
1	Russia	5	5	0	0	0	20	5	+15	15	Playoff round
2	Finland	5	3	0	0	2	9	11	−2	9	Playoff round
3	Germany	5	2	0	1	2	8	8	0	7	Playoff round
4	Denmark	5	2	0	0	3	13	12	+1	6	Playoff round
5	Belarus	5	1	1	0	3	7	11	−4	5	
6	Slovakia	5	1	0	0	4	8	18	−10	3	

Source: IIHF

All times are local (UTC+2).

14 May 2010; 16:15	Slovakia	0–6 (0–6, 0–0, 0–0)	Denmark	Lanxess Arena, Cologne; Attendance: 4,442

Game reference

Peter Budaj
Rastislav Staňa
Goalies
Patrick Galbraith
Referees:
(Norway) Ole Hansen
(Sweden) Christer Larking

0–1	1:05 – P. Regin (M. Bødker, D. Nielsen)
0–2	4:20 – P. Larsen (J. Damgaard, P. Regin) (PP2)
0–3	4:40 – M. Christensen (M. Green, P. Regin) (PP)
0–4	10:52 – M. Madsen (D. Nielsen, L. Eller) (PP)
0–5	12:21 – M. Green (K. Degn)
0–6	13:42 – S. Lassen (L. Eller, M. Madsen)

14 min
Penalties
2 min
26
Shots
34

14 May 2010; 20:15	Finland	2–0 (0–0, 2–0, 0–0)	Belarus	Lanxess Arena, Cologne; Attendance: 5,273

Game reference
Pekka Rinne	Goalies	Andrei Mezin	Referees: (United States) Rick Looker (Sweden) Patrik Sjöberg
J. Immonen (A. Miettinen) (PP) – 27:23 / 1–0; J. Hytönen (A. Pihlström – P. Puistola) – 32:19 / 2–0			Referees: (United States) Rick Looker (Sweden) Patrik Sjöberg
6 min	Penalties	12 min	Referees: (United States) Rick Looker (Sweden) Patrik Sjöberg
32	Shots	18	Referees: (United States) Rick Looker (Sweden) Patrik Sjöberg

15 May 2010; 20:15	Russia	3–2 (1–0, 1–1, 1–1)	Germany	Lanxess Arena, Cologne; Attendance: 18,343

Game reference

Semyon Varlamov
Goalies
Dimitrij Kotschnew
Referees:
(Czech Republic) Milan Minář
(Czech Republic) Vladimír Šindler

I. Kovalchuk (A. Frolov, A. Yemelin) – 14:20	1–0
N. Kulemin (M. Afinogenov, V. Kozlov) – 26:10	2–0
	2–1	39:59 – C. Ehrhoff (M. Wolf, K. Hospelt)
A. Ovechkin (A. Semin) – 49:46	3–1
	3–2	53:39 – A. Barta (S. Felski, D. Kreutzer)

8 min
Penalties
8 min
36
Shots
34

16 May 2010; 16:15	Denmark	1–6 (0–2, 1–1, 0–3)	Russia	Lanxess Arena, Cologne; Attendance: 5,789

Game reference

Frederik Andersen
Goalies
Vasiliy Koshechkin
Referees:
(Norway) Ole Hansen
(Sweden) Christer Larking

	0–1	15:07 – P. Datsyuk (I. Kovalchuk, E. Malkin)
	0–2	19:12 – A. Ovechkin (S. Fedorov) (SH)
M. Christensen (P. Regin, K. Staal) (PP) – 25:02	1–2
	1–3	33:40 – E. Malkin (I. Kovalchuk, P. Datsyuk) (PP)
	1–4	47:51 – P. Datsyuk (E. Malkin, I. Kovalchuk)
	1–5	50:51 – P. Datsyuk (PS)
	1–6	52:26 – N. Kulemin (M. Afinogenov, A. Anisimov)

10 min
Penalties
12 min
31
Shots
32

16 May 2010; 20:15	Germany	1–2 OT (0–1, 0–0, 1–0) (OT: 0–1)	Belarus	Lanxess Arena, Cologne; Attendance: 11,748

Game reference

Dennis Endras
Goalies
Andrei Mezin
Referees:
(Canada) Marc Muylaert
(Canada) Chris Savage

	0–1	6:43 – A. Mikhalev (Y. Chupris, E. Kovyrshin)
M. Müller (S. Felski) – 59:06	1–1
	1–2	64:45 – A. Kalyuzhny (M. Grabovski, A. Makritski)

8 min
Penalties
2 min
34
Shots
21

17 May 2010; 16:15	Finland	5–2 (0–0, 3–0, 2–2)	Slovakia	Lanxess Arena, Cologne; Attendance: 3,474

Game reference

Pekka Rinne
Goalies
Peter Budaj
Rastislav Staňa
Referees:
(Czech Republic) Milan Minář
(Canada) Chris Savage

P. Kontiola (T. Jaakola, S. Kapanen) – 29:20	1–0
P. Nummelin (R. Hahl) – 30:13	2–0
J. Jokinen (P. Nummelin, P. Puistola) – 33:26	3–0
	3–1	41:58 – T. Tatar (T. Starosta)
J. Jokinen (P. Nummelin, A. Miettinen) – 56:34	4–1
	4–2	58:01 – V. Mihálik (T. Starosta, M. Bartovič)
J. Aaltonen (J. Niskala, P. Rinne) (ENG) – 58:54	5–2

6 min
Penalties
8 min
35
Shots
29

17 May 2010; 20:15	Belarus	2–1 (0–1, 1–0, 1–0)	Denmark	Lanxess Arena, Cologne; Attendance: 3,257

Game reference

Vitali Koval
Goalies
Patrick Galbraith
Referees:
(United States) Rick Looker
(Czech Republic) Vladimír Šindler

	0–1	0:38 – L. Eller (M. Madsen, F. Nielsen)
A. Stas (A. Ugarov, A. Kalyuzhny) – 36:31	1–1
M. Stefanovich (M. Grabovski) (PP) – 57:49	2–1

10 min
Penalties
16 min
27
Shots
28

18 May 2010; 16:15	Slovakia	1–2 (0–1, 1–1, 0–0)	Germany	Lanxess Arena, Cologne; Attendance: 15,137

Game reference

Peter Budaj
Goalies
Dennis Endras
Referees:
(Norway) Ole Hansen
(Sweden) Patrik Sjöberg

	0–1	7:19 – A. Barta (D. Kreutzer)
	0–2	24:42 – D. Kreutzer (A. Barta, S. Felski)
M. Svatoš (D. Graňák) (PP) – 39:17	1–2

8 min
Penalties
6 min
22
Shots
26

18 May 2010; 20:15	Russia	5–0 (1–0, 2–0, 2–0)	Finland	Lanxess Arena, Cologne; Attendance: 11,687

Game reference

Semyon Varlamov
Goalies
Petri Vehanen
Referees:
(United States) Rick Looker
(Canada) Marc Muylaert

S. Fedorov (A. Semin, A. Ovechkin) (PP) – 16:42	1–0
E. Malkin (I. Kovalchuk, S. Gonchar) (PP) – 33:52	2–0
N. Kulemin (M. Afinogenov, A. Anisimov) – 34:02	3–0
A. Emelin (I. Kovalchuk) – 42:15	4–0
M. Afinogenov (D. Kulikov) – 42:55	5–0

22 min
Penalties
32 min
35
Shots
36

=== Group F ===
Pos	Team	Pld	W	OTW	OTL	L	GF	GA	GD	Pts	Qualification
1	Sweden	5	4	0	0	1	18	7	+11	12	Playoff round
2	Switzerland	5	3	0	0	2	12	12	0	9	Playoff round
3	Czech Republic	5	3	0	0	2	12	10	+2	9	Playoff round
4	Canada	5	2	0	0	3	22	12	+10	6	Playoff round
5	Norway	5	2	0	0	3	9	26	−17	6	
6	Latvia	5	1	0	0	4	10	16	−6	3	

Source: IIHF

All times are local (UTC+2).

14 May 2010; 16:15	Canada	12–1 (1–1, 7–0, 4–0)	Norway	SAP Arena, Mannheim; Attendance: 2,670

Game reference

Chris Mason
Chad Johnson
Goalies
Ruben Smith
André Lysenstøen
Referees:
(Slovakia) Vladimír Baluška
(Finland) Jari Levonen

	0–1	01:35 – Jonas Holøs
E. Kane (M. Staal) – 13:09	1–1
C. Perry (K. Russell, R. Whitney) (PP) – 23:51	2–1
M. Giordano (M. Duchene, J. Eberle) – 33:12	3–1
J. Tavares (PP) – 36:42	4–1
R. Peverley (E. Kane, J. Eberle) – 37:27	5–1
S. Downie (S. Ott) – 38:16	6–1
R. Whitney (B. Burns) – 39:06	7–1
E. Kane (J. Eberle, R. Peverley) – 39:48	8–1
J. Eberle (R. Peverley) (PP) – 40:39	9–1
J. Tavares (C. Perry) – 45:57	10–1
J. Tavares (B. Burns) – 49:18	11–1
M. Duchene (F. Beauchemin, R. Whitney) – 50:18	12–1

8 min
Penalties
31 min
44
Shots
19

14 May 2010; 20:15	Sweden	4–2 (3–1, 0–0, 1–1)	Latvia	SAP Arena, Mannheim; Attendance: 3,078

Game reference

Jacob Markström
Goalies
Edgars Masaļskis
Referees:
(Slovakia) Daniel Konc
(Germany) Daniel Piechaczek

M. Pääjärvi-Svensson (V. Hedman) – 0:31	1–0
	1–1	0:56 – M. Karsums (J. Sprukts)
O. Ekman-Larsson (F. Pettersson) – 5:08	2–1
M. Nylander (R. Wallin, C. Bäckman) – 14:30	3–1
	3–2	45:01 – M. Karsums (J. Sprukts)
T. Mårtensson (C. Gunnarsson, M. Pääjärvi-Svensson – 58:00	4–2

8 min
Penalties
4 min
36
Shots
21

15 May 2010; 20:15	Switzerland	3–2 (2–0, 1–2, 0–0)	Czech Republic	SAP Arena, Mannheim; Attendance: 7,206

Game reference

Martin Gerber
Goalies
Tomáš Vokoun
Referees:
(Russia) Rafael Kadyrov
(Russia) Konstantin Olenin

M. Plüss (G. Bezina, I. Rüthemann) – 4:13	1–0
A. Ambühl (D. Brunner, T. Monnet) – 14:07	2–0
	2–1	24:07 – J. Marek (J. Voráček)
A. Ambühl (T. Helbling) – 31:47	3–1
	3–2	34:41 – M. Blaťák (R. Červenka)

4 min
Penalties
8 min
24
Shots
32

16 May 2010; 16:15	Latvia	5–0 (0–0, 0–0, 5–0)	Norway	SAP Arena, Mannheim; Attendance: 1,925

Game reference

Edgars Masaļskis
Goalies
Pål Grotnes
Referees:
(Slovakia) Vladimír Baluška
(Slovakia) Daniel Konc

L. Dārziņš, (K. Sotnieks, A. Džeriņš) – 42:06	1–0
M. Cipulis, (A. Ņiživijs, H. Vasiļjevs) (PP) – 48:45	2–0
J. Sprukts (G. Galviņš, K. Daugaviņš) (PP) – 57:02	3–0
J. Sprukts (EN) – 58:25	4–0
G. Galviņš (A. Jerofejevs) – 59:54	5–0

12 min
Penalties
12 min
29
Shots
30

16 May 2010; 20:15	Sweden	3–1 (1–0, 2–0, 0–1)	Canada	SAP Arena, Mannheim; Attendance: 4,289

Game reference

Jonas Gustavsson
Goalies
Chris Mason
Chad Johnson
Referees:
(Finland) Tom Laaksonen
(United States) Thomas Sterns

J. Harju (A. Engqvist, O. Larsson) – 2:35	1–0
J. Andersson (J. Ericsson) – 21.47	2–0
J. Andersson (N. Persson) – 24.51	3–0
	3–1	46.57 – B. Laich

6 min
Penalties
4 min
32
Shots
33

17 May 2010; 16:15	Norway	3–2 (3–1, 0–0, 0–1)	Switzerland	SAP Arena, Mannheim; Attendance: 1,896

Game reference

Pål Grotnes
Goalies
Martin Gerber
Referees:
(Slovakia) Daniel Konc
(Russia) Konstantin Olenin

A. Bastiansen (M. Olimb, L. Spets) – 3:55	1–0
L. Spets (A. Bastiansen, M. Olimb) – 6:53	2–0
	2–1	7:49 – D. Brunner (R. Josi, A. Ambühl)
M. Zuccarello Aasen (O. Tollefsen, A. Fredriksen) – 18:39	3–1
	3–2	57:49 J. Vauclair (M. Seger)

4 min
Penalties
4 min
15
Shots
45

17 May 2010; 20:15	Czech Republic	3–1 (0–0, 2–0, 1–1)	Latvia	SAP Arena, Mannheim; Attendance: 3,354

Game reference

Tomáš Vokoun
Goalies
Edgars Masaļskis
Referees:
(Russia) Rafail Kadyrov
(Germany) Daniel Piechaczek

T. Rolinek (P. Koukal) (SH) – 22:21	1–0
T. Rolinek (P. Koukal) (SH) – 37:51	2–0
	2–1	52:05 – S. Pečura (K. Saulietis)
R. Červenka (J. Novotný) – 52:51	3–1

14 min
Penalties
10 min
32
Shots
26

18 May 2010; 16:15	Canada	2–3 (1–1, 0–2, 1–0)	Czech Republic	SAP Arena, Mannheim; Attendance: 6,466

Game reference

Chris Mason
Goalies
Tomáš Vokoun
Referees:
(Finland) Jari Levonen
(United States) Thomas Sterns

R. Whitney (M. Giordano, C. Mason) (PP) – 6:59	1–0
	1–1	18:20 – L. Kašpar (J. Novotný) (SH)
	1–2	32:19 – J. Jágr (P. Vampola, O. Němec)
	1–3	38:18 – J. Klepiš (M. Rozsíval, T. Vokoun) (PP)
M. Duchene (M. Raymond) – 58:49	2–3

16 min
Penalties
16 min
30
Shots
36

18 May 2010; 20:15	Switzerland	0–5 (0–1, 0–2, 0–2)	Sweden	SAP Arena, Mannheim; Attendance: 5,757

Game reference

Tobias Stephan
Goalies
Jacob Markström
Referees:
(Slovakia) Vladimír Baluška
(Finland) Tom Laaksonen

0–1	3:02 – M. Pääjärvi-Svensson (T. Mårtensson)
0–2	20:48 – J. Harju (E. Karlsson, J. Ericsson)
0–3	23:40 – V. Hedman (T. Mårtensson)
0–4	43:53 – F. Pettersson (J. Ericsson)
0–5	44:41 – T. Mårtensson (M. Pääjärvi-Svensson, M. Nilson)

4 min
Penalties
4 min
28
Shots
25

== Relegation round ==
The bottom team in the standings from each group of the preliminary round played in the relegation round. The bottom two teams in the relegation round moved down to Division 1 for the 2011 World Championship.

=== Group G ===
Pos	Team	Pld	W	OTW	OTL	L	GF	GA	GD	Pts	Qualification or relegation
1	United States	3	2	1	0	0	17	2	+15	8	Qualified for the 2011 Top Division
2	France	3	2	0	0	1	7	8	−1	6	Qualified for the 2011 Top Division
3	Italy	3	1	0	1	1	5	6	−1	4	Relegated to the 2011 Division I
4	Kazakhstan	3	0	0	0	3	4	17	−13	0	Relegated to the 2011 Division I

Source: IIHF

All times are local (UTC+2).

15 May; 16:15	United States	10–0 (4–0, 5–0, 1–0)	Kazakhstan	Lanxess Arena, Cologne; Attendance: 4,529

Game reference

Scott Clemmensen
Ben Bishop
Goalies
Alexei Kuznetsov
Pavel Zhitkov
Referees:
(Canada) Marc Muylaert
(Canada) Chris Savage

T. Oshie (K. Okposo, M. Greene) – 0:55	1–0
K. Okposo (T. Oshie, T. Galiardi) – 1:13	2–0
M. Gilroy (B. Dubinsky) (PP) – 6:53	3–0
M. Gilroy (T. Oshie, T. Galiardi) – 10:20	4–0
N. Foligno (B. Dubinsky) – 28:03	5–0
R. Potulny (B. Dubinsky, K. Yandle) – 36:34	6–0
M. Gilroy (R. Potulny, B. Dubinsky) – 36:46	7–0
B. Dubinsky (A. Greene) (PP2) – 38:44	8–0
T. Kennedy (C. Hanson, J. Hillen) (PP) – 39:29	9–0
C. Kreider (R. Carter) – 58:57	10–0

4 min
Penalties
26 min
45
Shots
28

15 May; 16:15	Italy	1–2 (0–1, 0–0, 1–1)	France	SAP Arena, Mannheim; Attendance: 3,173

Game reference

Daniel Bellissimo
Goalies
Fabrice Lhenry
Referees:
(Finland) Tom Laaksonen
(United States) Tom Sterns

	0–1	4:34 – B. Amar (S. Da Costa, P. Bellemare)
	0–2	43:14 – L. Gras (K. Hecquefeuille, P. Bellemare) (PP)
M. Strazzabosco (C. Borgatello, R. Ramoser) – 51:04 (PP)	1–2

6 min
Penalties
8 min
28
Shots
22

16 May; 12:15	France	0–4 (0–0, 0–2, 0–2)	United States	Lanxess Arena, Cologne; Attendance: 4,325

Game reference

Eddy Ferhi
Goalies
Scott Clemmensen
Referees:
(Czech Republic) Vladimír Šindler
(Sweden) Patrik Sjöberg

0–1	24:49 – N. Foligno (J. Johnson, B. Dubinsky)
0–2	34:06 – B. Dubinsky (D. Moss, M. Lundin)
0–3	41:36 – T. Oshie (T. Galiardi, K. Yandle)
0–4	53:41 – N. Foligno (B. Dubinsky, D. Moss)

8 min
Penalties
2 min
10
Shots
31

16 May; 12:15	Italy	2–1 (0–0, 0–0, 2–1)	Kazakhstan	SAP Arena, Mannheim; Attendance: 1,934

Game reference

Daniel Bellissimo
Goalies
Vitali Yeremeyev
Referees:
(Finland) Jari Levonen
(Germany) Daniel Piechaczek

	0–1	44:37 – R. Starchenko (K. Shafranov) (PP)
C. Borgatello (A. Egger, M. Souza) – 46:43	1–1
M. Souza (A. Egger, G. Scandella) (PP) – 49:30	2–1

10 min
Penalties
10 min
26
Shots
33

18 May; 12:15	United States	3 – 2 GWS (1–0, 0–1, 1–1) (OT: 0–0) (SO: 1–0)	Italy	Lanxess Arena, Cologne; Attendance: 5,864

Game reference

Scott Clemmensen
Goalies
Daniel Bellissimo
Referees:
(Sweden) Christer Larking
(Czech Republic) Milan Minář

B. Dubinsky (A. Greene, R. Potulny) (PP) – 11:45	1–0
	1–1	34:00 – G. Scandella (M. Souza)
	1–2	46:49 – S. Margoni (T. Johnson, P. Iannone)
R. Potulny (B. Dubinsky, M. Gilroy) (PP) – 51:08	2–2
T. Oshie – 65:00 (GWG)	3–2

8 min
Penalties
14 min
52
Shots
28

18 May; 12:15	Kazakhstan	3–5 (2–3, 0–1, 1–1)	France	SAP Arena, Mannheim; Attendance: 7,845

Game reference

Vitaliy Yeremeyev
Goalies
Fabrice Lhenry
Referees:
(Russia) Rafail Kadyrov
(Russia) Konstantin Olenin

	0–1	8:39 – S. Treille (PP)
D. Dudarev – 10:30	1–1
	1–2	12:19 – L. Meunier
	1–3	13:43 – L. Gras (L. Tardif)
R. Starchenko (M. Semenov, K. Shafranov) (PP) – 15:55	2–3
	2–4	29:46 – B. Amar (J. Auvitu) (PP)
	2–5	48:42 – P. Bellemare (A. Lussier, N. Besch)
V. Krasnoslabodtsev (A. Vassilchenko) – 53:18	3–5

16 min
Penalties
10 min
38
Shots
22

== Playoff round ==
=== Bracket ===
Quarterfinals
E1	Russia	5
F4	Canada	2
F2	Switzerland	0
E3	Germany	1
F1	Sweden	4
E4	Denmark	2
E2	Finland	1
F3	Czech Republic	2

Semifinals
QF1	Russia	2
QF2	Germany	1
QF3	Sweden	2
QF4	Czech Republic	3

Finals
SF1	Russia	1
SF2	Czech Republic	2
Bronze medal game
SF1	Germany	1
SF2	Sweden	3

=== Quarter-finals ===
All times are local (UTC+2).

20 May; 16:15	Finland	1–2 GWS (1–0, 0–0, 0–1) (OT: 0–0) (SO: 0–1)	Czech Republic	Lanxess Arena, Cologne; Attendance: 9,258

Game reference

Pekka Rinne
Goalies
Tomáš Vokoun
Referees:
(Canada) Chris Savage
(Sweden) Patrik Sjöberg

P. Kontiola (J. Niskala, P. Nummelin) – 0:55	1–0
	1–1	41:12 – J. Klepiš (M. Blaťák) (PP)
	1–2	70:00 – J. Marek (GWG)

8 min
Penalties
10 min
30
Shots
35

20 May; 16:15	Sweden	4–2 (1–0, 2–1, 1–1)	Denmark	SAP Arena, Mannheim; Attendance: 3,487

Game reference

Jonas Gustavsson
Goalies
Patrick Galbraith
Referees:
(Finland) Jari Levonen
(Germany) Daniel Piechaczek

M. Nilson (M. Johansson, T. Martensson) (PP) – 14:58	1–0
J. Andersson, (J. Ericsson, M. Backlund) – 27:21	2–0
R. Wallin (A. Engvist, M. Johannson) (SH) – 32:29	3–0
	3–1	33:18 – J. Damgaard (L. Eller, F. Nielsen)
L. Omark (N. Persson, J. Harju) (PP) – 53:17	4–1
	4–2	57:35 – M. Madsen (D. Nielsen, J. Damgaard) (PP)

10 min
Penalties
12 min
39
Shots
29

20 May; 20:15	Russia	5–2 (1–0, 2–0, 2–2)	Canada	Lanxess Arena, Cologne; Attendance: 12,274

Game reference

Semyon Varlamov
Goalies
Chris Mason
Referees:
(Sweden) Christer Larking
(Czech Republic) Vladimír Šindler

M. Afinogenov (D. Kulikov, V. Atyushov) – 19:02	1–0
P. Datsyuk (S. Gonchar, I. Kovalchuk) (PP2) – 21:45	2–0
E. Malkin (D. Kalinin, I. Kovalchuk) (PP) – 37:31	3–0
S. Fedorov (V. Atyushov) – 47:31	4–0
	4–1	53:52 – J. Tavares (B. Burns)
E. Malkin (I. Kovalchuk, I. Nikulin) (ENG) – 56:56	5–1
	5–2	59:46 – M. Duchene (K. Cumiskey, T. Myers)

30 min
Penalties
48 min
30
Shots
27

20 May; 20:15	Switzerland	0–1 (0–0, 0–1, 0–0)	Germany	SAP Arena, Mannheim; Attendance: 12,500

Game reference
Martin Gerber	Goalies	Dennis Endras	Referees: (Finland) Tom Laaksonen (United States) Thomas Sterns
0–1 / 30:46 – P. Gogulla (K. Hospelt, A. Sulzer)			Referees: (Finland) Tom Laaksonen (United States) Thomas Sterns
80 min	Penalties	41 min	Referees: (Finland) Tom Laaksonen (United States) Thomas Sterns
41	Shots	25	Referees: (Finland) Tom Laaksonen (United States) Thomas Sterns

Quarterfinals in Cologne were scheduled to be the pairs 1E–4F and 2E–3F, and in Mannheim the pairs 1F–4E and 2F–3E.

=== Semi-finals ===
All times are local (UTC+2).

22 May; 14:00	Sweden	2–3 GWS (1–1, 1–0, 0–1) (OT: 0–0) (SO: 0–1)	Czech Republic	Lanxess Arena, Cologne; Attendance: 13,437

Game reference

Jonas Gustavsson
Goalies
Tomáš Vokoun
Referees:
(United States) Rick Looker
(Canada) Chris Savage

J. Harju (E. Karlsson, L. Omark) – 8:29	1–0
	1–1	17:28 – T. Mojžíš (L. Kašpar, T. Rolinek)
A. Engqvist (T. Mårtensson, O. Larsson) – 31:25	2–1
	2–2	59:52 – K. Rachůnek (J. Voráček)
	2–3	70:00 – J. Marek (GWG)

10 min
Penalties
12 min
35
Shots
33

22 May; 18:00	Russia	2–1 (0–1, 1–0, 1–0)	Germany	Lanxess Arena, Cologne; Attendance: 18,734

Game reference

Vasiliy Koshechkin
Goalies
Rob Zepp
Referees:
(Slovakia) Vladimír Baluška
(Finland) Jari Levonen

	0–1	15:30 – M. Goc (F. Schütz, C. Ehrhoff) (PP2)
E. Malkin (S. Gonchar, I. Kovalchuk) – 31:07	1–1
P. Datsyuk – 58:10	2–1

31 min
Penalties
8 min
32
Shots
27

Pairs were the winner of 1E–4F vs. the winner of 2F–3E and 1F–4E vs. 2E–3F.

=== Bronze medal game ===
Time is local (UTC+2).

23 May; 16:15	Sweden	3–1 (1–0, 0–1, 2–0)	Germany	Lanxess Arena, Cologne; Attendance: 15,873

Game reference

Jonas Gustavsson
Anders Lindbäck
Goalies
Dennis Endras
Referees:
(Canada) Chris Savage
(Czech Republic) Vladimír Šindler

M. Pääjärvi-Svensson (C. Bäckman) – 2:56	1–0
	1–1	36:03 – A. Barta (D. Kreutzer)
J. Andersson (R. Wallin, M. Johansson) – 43:57	2–1
J. Andersson (M. Johannson) (ENG) – 59:27	3–1

4 min
Penalties
6 min
42
Shots
21

=== Gold medal game ===
Time is local (UTC+2).

23 May; 20:30	Russia	1–2 (0–1, 0–1, 1–0)	Czech Republic	Lanxess Arena, Cologne; Attendance: 19,132

Game reference

Semyon Varlamov
Goalies
Tomáš Vokoun
Referees:
(Slovakia) Vladimír Baluška
(Finland) Jari Levonen

	0–1	0:20 – J. Klepiš (J. Jágr)
	0–2	38:13 – T. Rolinek (K. Rachůnek)
P. Datsyuk (I. Kovalchuk, S. Gonchar) – 59:24	1–2

31 min
Penalties
10 min
36
Shots
25

== Ranking and statistics ==
2010 IIHF World Championship winners

Czech Republic
6th/12th title

=== Tournament awards ===
- Best players selected by the directorate:
  - Best Goaltender: (Germany) Dennis Endras
  - Best Defenceman: (Finland) Petteri Nummelin
  - Best Forward: (Russia) Pavel Datsyuk
  - Most Valuable Player: (Germany) Dennis Endras
- Media All-Star Team:
  - Goaltender: (Germany) Dennis Endras
  - Defence: (Germany) Christian Ehrhoff, (Finland) Petteri Nummelin
  - Forwards: (Russia) Pavel Datsyuk, (Russia) Evgeni Malkin, (Sweden) Magnus Pääjärvi-Svensson

=== Final standings ===
The final standings of the tournament according to IIHF:

1st place, gold medalist(s)	Czech Republic
2nd place, silver medalist(s)	Russia
3rd place, bronze medalist(s)	Sweden
4	Germany
5	Switzerland
6	Finland
7	Canada
8	Denmark
9	Norway
10	Belarus
11	Latvia
12	Slovakia
13	United States
14	France
15	Italy
16	Kazakhstan

=== Scoring leaders ===
List shows the top skaters sorted by points, then goals. If the list exceeds 10 skaters because of a tie in points, all of the tied skaters are shown.

Player	GP	G	A	Pts	+/−	PIM	POS
(Russia) Ilya Kovalchuk	9	2	10	12	+8	2	FW
(United States) Brandon Dubinsky	6	3	7	10	+3	2	FW
(Sweden) Magnus Pääjärvi-Svensson	9	5	4	9	+8	2	FW
(Canada) Ray Whitney	7	2	6	8	0	0	FW
(Canada) John Tavares	7	7	0	7	+2	6	FW
(Russia) Pavel Datsyuk	6	6	1	7	+6	0	FW
(Russia) Evgeni Malkin	5	5	2	7	+6	10	FW
(Canada) Matt Duchene	7	4	3	7	+5	0	FW
(Russia) Maxim Afinogenov	9	3	4	7	+7	18	FW
(Czech Republic) Jaromír Jágr	9	3	4	7	+1	12	FW
(Czech Republic) Jakub Klepiš	9	3	4	7	−1	8	FW

GP = Games played; G = Goals; A = Assists; Pts = Points; +/− = Plus/minus; PIM = Penalties in minutes; POS = Position
Source: IIHF.com
02:45, 24 May 2010 (UTC)

=== Leading goaltenders ===
Only the top five goaltenders, based on save percentage, who have played 40% of their team's minutes are included in this list.

Player	TOI	SA	GA	GAA	Sv%	SO
(Germany) Dennis Endras	364:06	181	7	1.15	96.13	1
(Russia) Semyon Varlamov	297:53	135	7	1.41	95.07	1
(Italy) Daniel Bellissimo	263:51	172	9	2.05	94.77	0
(Czech Republic) Tomáš Vokoun	496:27	234	13	1.57	94.44	0
(Belarus) Andrei Mezin	183:57	104	6	1.96	94.23	0

TOI = Time On Ice (minutes:seconds); SA = Shots against; GA = Goals against; GAA = Goals against average; Sv% = Save percentage; SO = Shutouts
Source: IIHF.com
Updated: 02:48, 24 May 2010 (UTC)

== Officials ==
The IIHF selected 16 referees and 16 linesmen to work the 2010 IIHF World Championship. They are the following:

Referees
(Slovakia) Vladimír Baluška
(Norway) Ole Stian Hansen
(Russia) Rafael Kadyrov
(Slovakia) Daniel Konc
(Finland) Tom Laaksonen
(Finland) Jari Levonen
(United States) Rick Looker
(Czech Republic) Milan Minář

Referees
(Canada) Marc Muylaert
(Russia) Konstantin Olenin
(Sweden) Sören Persson
(Germany) Daniel Piechaczek
(Canada) Chris Savage
(Czech Republic) Vladimír Šindler
(Sweden) Patrik Sjöberg
(United States) Tom Sterns

Linesmen
(Switzerland) Roger Arm
(Canada) Daniel Bechard
(France) Eric Bouguin
(United States) David Brown
(Belarus) Ivan Dedioulia
(Latvia) Ansis Eglītis
(Germany) Thomas Gemeinhardt
(Russia) Konstantin Gordenko

Linesmen
(Czech Republic) František Kalivoda
(Austria) Christian Kaspar
(Germany) Andreas Kowert
(Sweden) Peter Sabelström
(Estonia) Anton Semjonov
(Finland) Jussi Terho
(Slovakia) Miroslav Valach
(Switzerland) Tobias Wehrli

== IIHF broadcasting rights ==
The IIHF sold the rights for the broadcast of 2010 IIHF World Championship to the following countries.

Standard Definition
Country	Broadcaster
Austria	ORF
Belarus	BTRC
Belarus	Orange
Bosnia-Herzegovina	Arena Sport
Brazil	Sportv
Bulgaria	Nova Sport
Canada	TSN
Canada	RDS
Canada	CTV
China	CCTV-5
Czech Republic	Czech Television
Czech Republic	Czech Radio
Denmark	Viasat
Denmark	DR
Estonia	Viasat
Finland	YLE
Finland	Urho TV
France	Sport+
France	France Télévisions
Germany	Sport1
Germany	ARD
Germany	N24
Germany	Pro7
Germany	RTL
Germany	Sat.1
Germany	ZDF
Germany	RNF
Germany	Servus TV
Hong Kong	I-CABLE
Hungary	Chello Central Europe
Hungary	Polsat

Standard Definition
Country	Broadcaster
Iceland	RÚV
Italy	RAI
Kazakhstan	KZSport1
Kazakhstan	Orange
Latvia	Viasat
Lithuania	Viasat
Luxembourg	Servus TV
Middle East and North Africa List of countries: Algeria; Bahrain; Comoros; Djibouti; Egypt; Iraq; Jordan; Kuwait; Lebanon; Oman; Palestinian Authority; Libya; Mauritania; Morocco; Qatar; Saudi Arabia; Somalia; Sudan; Syria; Tunisia; UAE; Yemen	Al Jazeera Sports
Montenegro	Arena Sport
Norway	Viasat
Norway	NRK
Norway	TV2
Poland	Polsat
Romania	Chello Central Europe
Romania	Polsat
Russia	Perviy Kanal
Russia	VGTRK
Serbia	Arena Sport
Slovakia	STV
Slovakia	Slovenský rozhlas
Slovakia	Radio Expres
Slovenia	Class1
Slovenia	Sport TV
Spain	Enjoy TV
Sweden	Viasat
Sweden	SVT
Sweden	Aftonbladet TV
Switzerland	SRG SSR idée suisse
Ukraine	Pershiy Nazional'nyi
USA	Universal Sports

High Definition
Country	Broadcaster
Austria	ORF1 HD
Canada	TSN HD
Canada	RDS HD
Denmark	TV2 Sport HD
Finland	YLE HD
Norway	Viasat Sport HD
Poland	Polsat Sport HD
Russia	HD Sport
Sweden	Viasat Sport HD
Switzerland	HD Suisse

== IIHF honors and awards ==
The 2010 IIHF Hall of Fame induction ceremony has held in Cologne during the World Championships. Lou Vairo of the United States was given the Paul Loicq Award for outstanding contributions to international ice hockey.

IIHF Hall of Fame inductees

- Rickard Fagerlund, Sweden
- Dieter Hegen, Germany
- Artūrs Irbe, Latvia
- Vladimir Krutov, Russia
- Riikka Nieminen-Välilä, Finland
