= 2010 IIHF World Championship final =

Ice hockey match

	1	2	3	Total
Russia	0	0	1	1
Czech Republic	1	1	0	2
- Date: May 23, 2010
- Arena: Lanxess Arena
- City: Cologne
- Attendance: 19,132

The 2010 IIHF World Championship final was the gold medal match at the 2010 IIHF World Championship. The match was played in Lanxess Arena in Cologne on 23 May. The Czech Republic defeated the favored Russian team 2–1.

== Background ==
The final was the first gold medal game between Russia and the Czech Republic in the history of the tournament. Before, they faced each other at the 1998 Winter Olympics, where the Czechs defeated the Russians in the gold medal game. In addition, the predecessors of both these nations, the USSR and Czechoslovakia, had met several times in the 1960s, 1970s, and 1980s.

It was Russia's third consecutive finals appearance, and the Czech Republic's first appearance since 2006.

== Road to the final ==
Russia
Round
Czech Republic

Team	GP	W	OTW	OTL	L	GF	GA	DIF	PTS
Russia	3	3	0	0	0	10	3	+7	9
Slovakia	3	2	0	0	1	10	6	+4	6
Belarus	3	1	0	0	2	8	9	−1	3
Kazakhstan	3	0	0	0	3	4	14	−10	0

First Round

Team	GP	W	OTW	OTL	L	GF	GA	DIF	PTS
Sweden	3	2	0	0	1	9	6	+3	6
Czech Republic	3	2	0	0	1	10	6	+4	6
Norway	3	2	0	0	1	10	8	+2	6
France	3	0	0	0	3	5	14	−9	0

Team	GP	W	OTW	OTL	L	GF	GA	DIF	PTS
Russia	5	5	0	0	0	20	5	+15	15
Finland	5	3	0	0	2	9	11	−2	9
Germany	5	2	0	1	2	8	8	0	7
Denmark	5	2	0	0	3	13	12	+1	6
Belarus	5	1	1	0	3	7	11	−4	5
Slovakia	5	1	0	0	4	8	18	−10	3

Second Round

Team	GP	W	OTW	OTL	L	GF	GA	DIF	PTS
Sweden	5	4	0	0	1	18	7	+11	12
Switzerland	5	3	0	0	2	12	12	0	9
Czech Republic	5	3	0	0	2	12	10	+2	9
Canada	5	2	0	0	3	22	12	+10	6
Norway	5	2	0	0	3	9	26	−17	6
Latvia	5	1	0	0	4	10	16	−6	3

Opponent
Result
Playoff Round
Opponent
Result
Canada
5–2
Quarter-finals
Finland
2–1 GWS
Germany
2–1
Semi-finals
Sweden
3–2 GWS

== Venue ==
The Lanxess Arena in Cologne was determined to host the finalists of the tournament. Previously at the tournament, the venue hosted the two semi-finals, and also the Bronze medal match. In the final, the attendance was 19,132.

== The match ==
=== Summary ===
The match began with a goal after just 20 seconds, scored by Jakub Klepiš from a pass by Jaromír Jágr. The goal was seemingly the result of a defensive mistake which led to a Czech offensive possession with Russian defensemen out of position. For the remainder of the period the Russians held almost complete possession of the puck, and veteran Sergei Fedorov hit the post after an odd man rush. Very late in the period the Russians put the puck in the net on a power play, but it was determined to be after the clock had run out and was ruled as no goal. There was some brief confusion however, as the buzzer sounds after the clock on the scoreboard runs out.

In the second period Russia pressed once again but the Czech Republic slowed the game down and forced Russia to regroup, resulting in an error in the Russian defensive zone when Alexander Ovechkin collided with teammate Fedorov. This led to a 3-on-2 rush for the Czechs and Karel Rachůnek centered the puck while Tomáš Rolinek crashed the net. The puck was redirected off Rolinek's skates, and it was ruled a good goal because there was no kicking motion visible.

The third period began with more Russian pressure, including a close chance off the post by Evgeni Malkin, but at the midway point of the period Russian Alexei Emelin was given a five-minute major and thrown out of the game for clipping Jaromír Jágr, who did not return for the remainder of the game. This was followed by more penalty trouble for both teams. In the final minutes after pulling goaltender Semyon Varlamov, Pavel Datsyuk buried a goal on a 5-on-3 with 35 seconds left, bringing Russia within one goal of the Czechs. Under pressure the Czech goalie Tomáš Vokoun managed to stave off the final Russian assault and the Czechs held on to win the game 2–1.

=== Details ===
23 May 2010; 20:30	Russia	1–2 (0–1, 0–1, 1–0)	Czech Republic	Lanxess Arena, Cologne; Attendance: 19,132

Game reference

Semyon Varlamov
Goalies
Tomáš Vokoun
Referees:
(Slovakia) Vladimír Baluška
(Finland) Jari Levonen

	0–1	0:20 – J. Klepiš (J. Jágr)
	0–2	38:13 – T. Rolinek (K. Rachůnek)
P. Datsyuk (I. Kovalchuk, S. Gonchar) – 59:24	1–2

31 min
Penalties
10 min
36
Shots
25

== Aftermath ==
The president of the Czech Republic Václav Klaus handed out the gold medals alongside IIHF president René Fasel. It was the sixth title for the Czech Republic, and first after 2005.

== See also ==
- 2010 IIHF World Championship
- Russia national ice hockey team
- Czech Republic national ice hockey team
