= Sven Felski =

German ice hockey player, coach, and executive

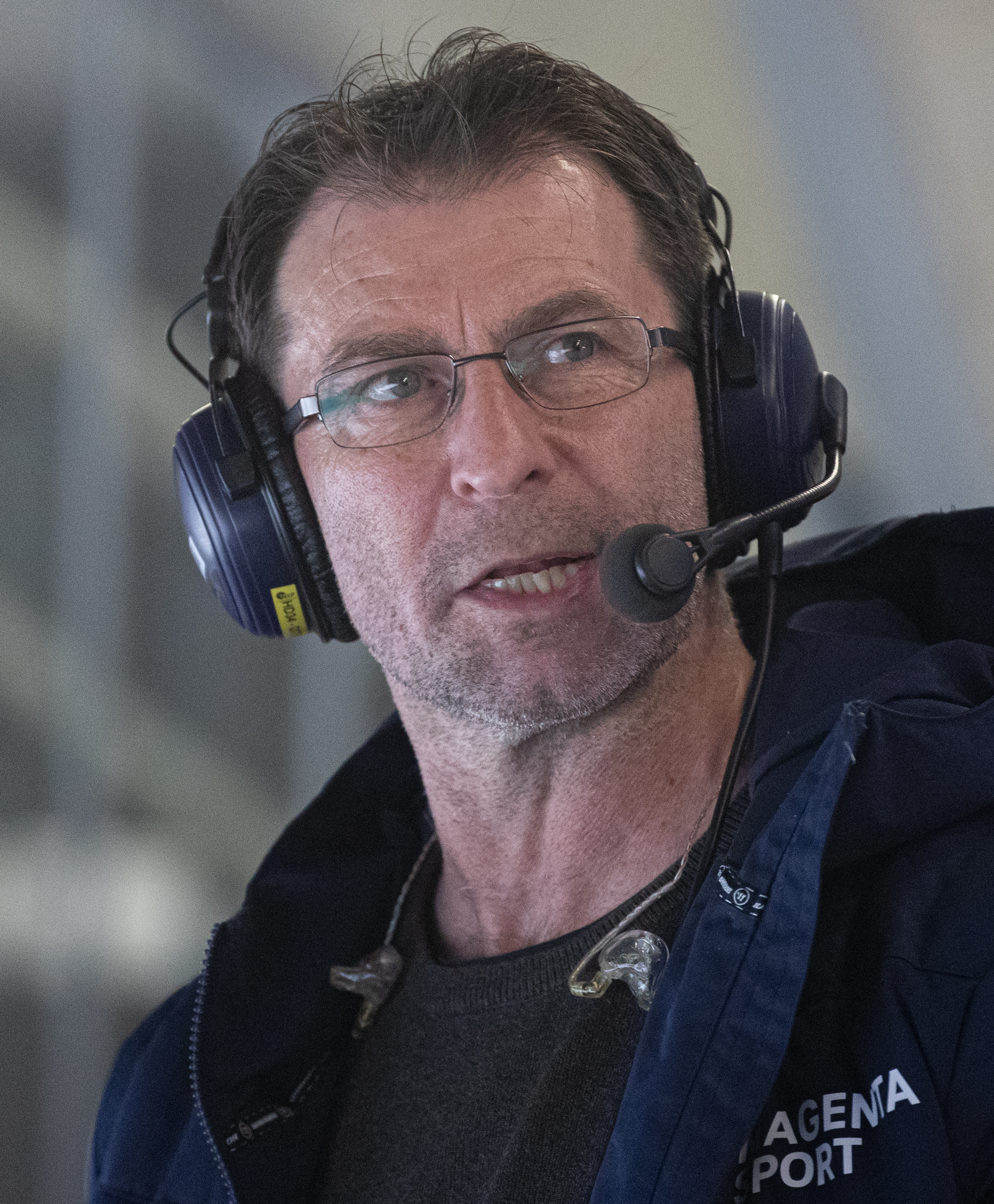
- Felski in 2025
- Born: November 18, 1974 (age 51) East Berlin, East Germany
- Height: 5 ft 11 in (180 cm)
- Weight: 165 lb (75 kg; 11 st 11 lb)
- Position: Left wing
- Shot: Left
- DEL team: Eisbären Berlin
- National team: Germany
- Playing career: 1992–2012

Sven Felski (born November 18, 1974, in East Berlin, East Germany) is a German ice hockey coach and executive and retired German professional ice hockey winger. He played for Eisbären Berlin of the Deutsche Eishockey Liga (DEL). He was inducted into the German Ice Hockey Hall of Fame in 2015.

== Playing career ==
Felski began his professional career with Eisbären in 1992, and remained with the team his entire career until he retired in 2012. He captured six German championships and the 2010 European Trophy with the Eisbären squad. He was selected to the DEL All-Star game in 2003, 2005, 2006, 2007, 2008, and 2009.

Felski represented the German national team at the 1993 and 1994 World Junior Ice Hockey Championships, the 1998, 1999, 2001, 2003, 2005, 2006, 2007, and 2009 Ice Hockey World Championships, and the 2006 Winter Olympics and 2010 Winter Olympics.

== Coaching career ==
In August 2015, Felski was named head coach of the German U17 national team. He has been serving as sport director of Eisbären Juniors Berlin e.V. since May 2016.

== Career statistics ==
=== Regular season and playoffs ===
			Regular season					Playoffs
Season	Team	League	GP	G	A	Pts	PIM	GP	G	A	Pts	PIM
1990–91	Dynamo Berlin	DEU U20
1991–92	Dynamo Berlin	DEU U20
1992–93	Eisbären Berlin	1.GBun	26	3	4	7	26	—	—	—	—	—
1993–94	Eisbären Berlin	1.GBun	40	2	9	11	61	—	—	—	—	—
1994–95	Eisbären Berlin	DEL	38	15	17	32	102	—	—	—	—	—
1995–96	Eisbären Berlin	DEL	28	14	18	32	94	—	—	—	—	—
1996–97	Eisbären Berlin	DEL	38	2	10	12	34	8	0	0	0	8
1997–98	Eisbären Berlin	DEL	38	10	7	17	48	10	0	1	1	12
1998–99	Eisbären Berlin	DEL	46	10	21	31	79	7	0	1	1	8
1999–2000	Eisbären Berlin	DEL	50	11	7	18	74	—	—	—	—	—
2000–01	Eisbären Berlin	DEL	51	20	22	42	92	—	—	—	—	—
2001–02	Eisbären Berlin	DEL	52	7	24	31	104	4	0	0	0	22
2002–03	Eisbären Berlin	DEL	51	13	16	29	126	9	1	3	4	20
2003–04	Eisbären Berlin	DEL	28	8	6	14	36	9	1	0	1	58
2004–05	Eisbären Berlin	DEL	49	13	12	25	95	12	2	2	4	33
2005–06	Eisbären Berlin	DEL	40	10	22	32	84	11	2	5	7	20
2006–07	Eisbären Berlin	DEL	49	11	20	31	133	3	0	0	0	14
2007–08	Eisbären Berlin	DEL	59	19	23	42	70	13	3	10	13	49
2008–09	Eisbären Berlin	DEL	47	14	30	44	103	11	4	6	10	38
2009–10	Eisbären Berlin	DEL	46	12	22	34	52	5	1	4	5	6
2010–11	Eisbären Berlin	DEL	44	4	15	19	87	12	1	3	4	14
2011–12	Eisbären Berlin	DEL	47	12	20	32	69	13	1	2	3	18
DEL totals			794	205	312	517	1482	127	16	37	53	320

=== International ===
Year	Team	Event	GP	G	A	Pts	PIM
1990	East Germany	EJC C
1991	Germany	EJC	5	1	0	1	16
1992	Germany	EJC	6	4	4	8	12
1993	Germany	WJC	7	2	0	2	28
1994	Germany	WJC	7	1	1	2	35
1998	Germany	WC	6	0	2	2	18
1999	Germany	WC B	7	0	1	1	2
2001	Germany	OGQ	3	0	0	0	0
2001	Germany	WC	1	0	0	0	0
2003	Germany	WC	6	2	0	2	14
2005	Germany	WC	6	0	1	1	10
2006	Germany	OG	5	2	0	2	4
2006	Germany	WC D1	5	1	1	2	8
2007	Germany	WC	6	1	3	4	8
2008	Germany	WC	6	0	1	1	6
2009	Germany	OGQ	2	0	1	1	2
2009	Germany	WC	6	0	0	0	4
2010	Germany	OG	4	0	0	0	2
2010	Germany	WC	9	0	3	3	8
Junior totals			25	8	5	13	91
Senior totals			72	6	13	19	86
