= Nick Plastino =

Canadian-born Italian ice hockey player (born 1986)

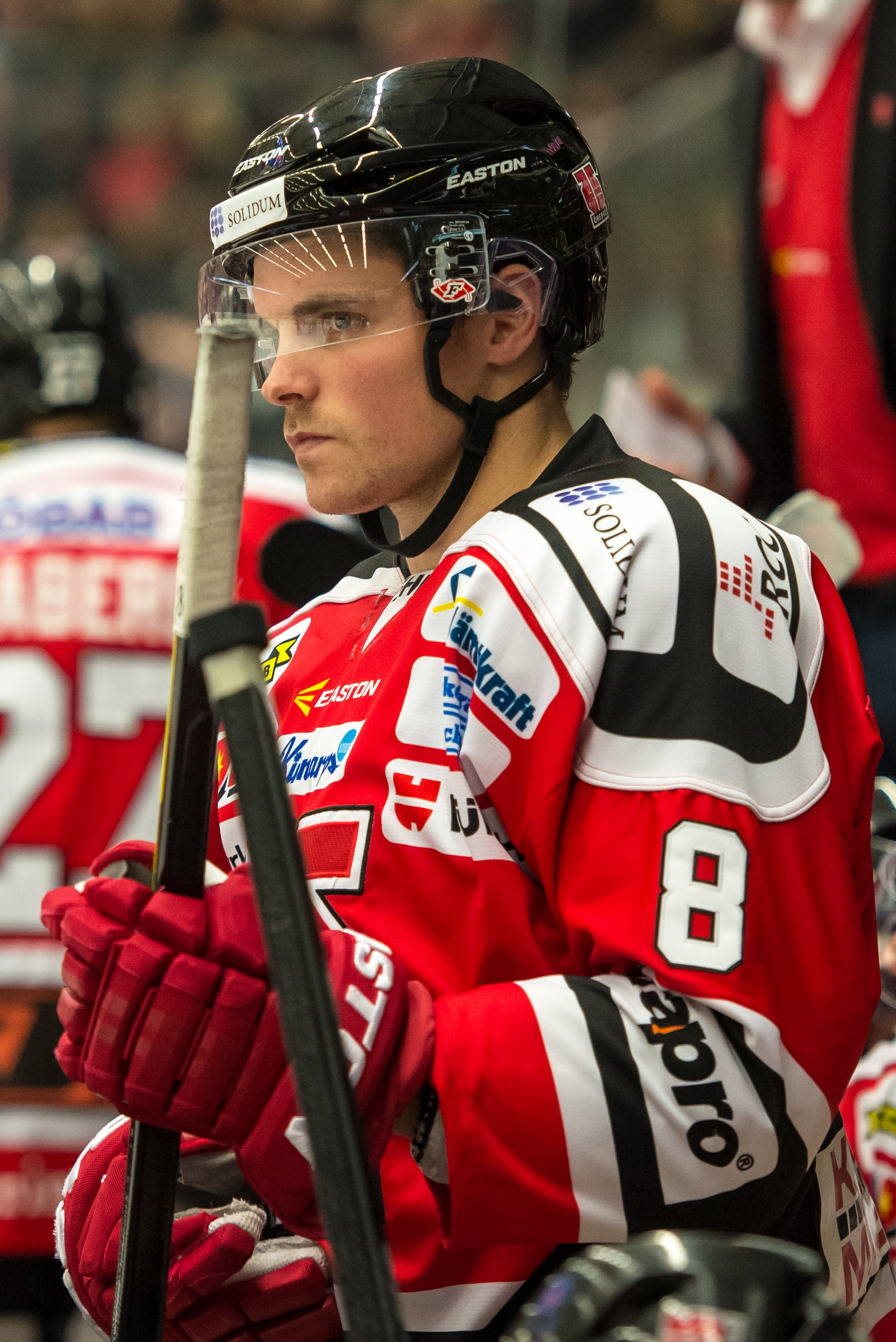
- Plastino in 2013
- Born: February 20, 1986 (age 40) Sault Ste. Marie, Ontario, Canada
- Height: 5 ft 11 in (180 cm)
- Weight: 201 lb (91 kg; 14 st 5 lb)
- Position: Defence
- Shot: Right
- ICEHL team Former teams: HC Bolzano; HC Asiago; Wheeling Nailers; Örebro HK; Stavanger Oilers; Tappara; HC Slovan Bratislava; HC Ambrì-Piotta
- National team: Italy
- NHL draft: Undrafted
- Playing career: 2007–2023

Nicholas Plastino (born February 20, 1986) is a Canadian-born Italian former professional ice hockey defenceman who last played with HC Pustertal Wölfe in the ICE Hockey League (ICEHL).

== Playing career ==
On July 7, 2017, Plastino agreed to a one-year contract with HC Ambrì-Piotta of the National League (NL).

== International play ==
Plastino competed at the 2010 and 2012 IIHF World Championships as a member of the Italy men's national ice hockey team.

== Career statistics ==
| | | | Regular season | | | | | Playoffs |
| Season | Team | League | GP | G | A | Pts | PIM | GP | G | A | Pts | PIM |
|---|---|---|---|---|---|---|---|---|---|---|---|---|
| 2001–02 | Soo Thunder U15 | NOHL U15 | 32 | 4 | 10 | 14 | 96 | — | — | — | — | — |
| 2001–02 | Sault Ste. Marie North Stars U18 | GNML | 4 | 0 | 1 | 1 | 0 | 1 | 0 | 1 | 1 | 0 |
| 2001–02 | Soo Thunderbirds | NOJHL | — | — | — | — | — | 3 | 0 | 0 | 0 | 0 |
| 2002–03 | Blind River Beavers | NOJHL | 46 | 9 | 16 | 25 | 23 | 4 | 0 | 0 | 0 | 0 |
| 2003–04 | Collingwood Blues | OPJHL | 43 | 8 | 18 | 26 | 78 | 8 | 0 | 4 | 4 | 33 |
| 2003–04 | Barrie Colts | OHL | 15 | 0 | 1 | 1 | 2 | 1 | 0 | 0 | 0 | 0 |
| 2004–05 | Barrie Colts | OHL | 34 | 1 | 5 | 6 | 8 | 6 | 0 | 2 | 2 | 2 |
| 2005–06 | Barrie Colts | OHL | 68 | 5 | 15 | 20 | 68 | 14 | 1 | 2 | 3 | 17 |
| 2006–07 | Barrie Colts | OHL | 66 | 5 | 35 | 40 | 69 | 8 | 3 | 4 | 7 | 4 |
| 2007–08 | HC Asiago | Italy | 39 | 4 | 15 | 19 | 46 | — | — | — | — | — |
| 2008–09 | HC Asiago | Italy | 42 | 7 | 10 | 17 | 22 | 3 | 2 | 1 | 3 | 2 |
| 2009–10 | HC Asiago | Italy | 40 | 9 | 17 | 26 | 16 | 14 | 2 | 6 | 8 | 14 |
| 2010–11 | HC Asiago | Italy | 40 | 4 | 26 | 30 | 50 | 17 | 3 | 7 | 10 | 14 |
| 2011–12 | Wheeling Nailers | ECHL | 13 | 4 | 5 | 9 | 12 | — | — | — | — | — |
| 2011–12 | Bofors IK | HockeyAllsvenskan | 25 | 4 | 12 | 16 | 59 | 10 | 0 | 0 | 0 | 2 |
| 2012–13 | BIK Karlskoga | HockeyAllsvenskan | 52 | 9 | 15 | 24 | 45 | 6 | 1 | 0 | 1 | 2 |
| 2013–14 | Örebro HK | SHL | 49 | 2 | 6 | 8 | 18 | 10 | 2 | 1 | 3 | 4 |
| 2014–15 | Stavanger Oilers | Norway | 42 | 12 | 28 | 40 | 14 | 15 | 3 | 6 | 9 | 4 |
| 2015–16 | Tappara | Liiga | 55 | 8 | 14 | 22 | 20 | 18 | 2 | 9 | 11 | 33 |
| 2016–17 | HC Slovan Bratislava | KHL | 60 | 7 | 19 | 26 | 34 | — | — | — | — | — |
| 2017–18 | HC Ambrì-Piotta | NL | 47 | 7 | 21 | 28 | 10 | — | — | — | — | — |
| 2018–19 | HC Ambrì-Piotta | NL | 44 | 6 | 16 | 22 | 10 | 5 | 0 | 0 | 0 | 4 |
| 2019–20 | HC Ambrì-Piotta | NL | 48 | 3 | 21 | 24 | 22 | — | — | — | — | — |
| 2020–21 | HC Bolzano | ICEHL | 47 | 5 | 20 | 25 | 12 | 16 | 2 | 6 | 8 | 4 |
| 2021–22 | HC Bolzano | ICEHL | 44 | 7 | 16 | 23 | 10 | 2 | 0 | 0 | 0 | 0 |
| 2022–23 | HC Pustertal Wölfe | ICEHL | 27 | 2 | 9 | 11 | 8 | — | — | — | — | — |
| NL totals | | | 139 | 16 | 58 | 74 | 42 | 5 | 0 | 0 | 0 | 4 |
| Italy totals | | | 161 | 24 | 68 | 92 | 134 | 34 | 7 | 14 | 21 | 30 |
