= Morten Madsen =

Danish professional ice hockey forward (born 1987)

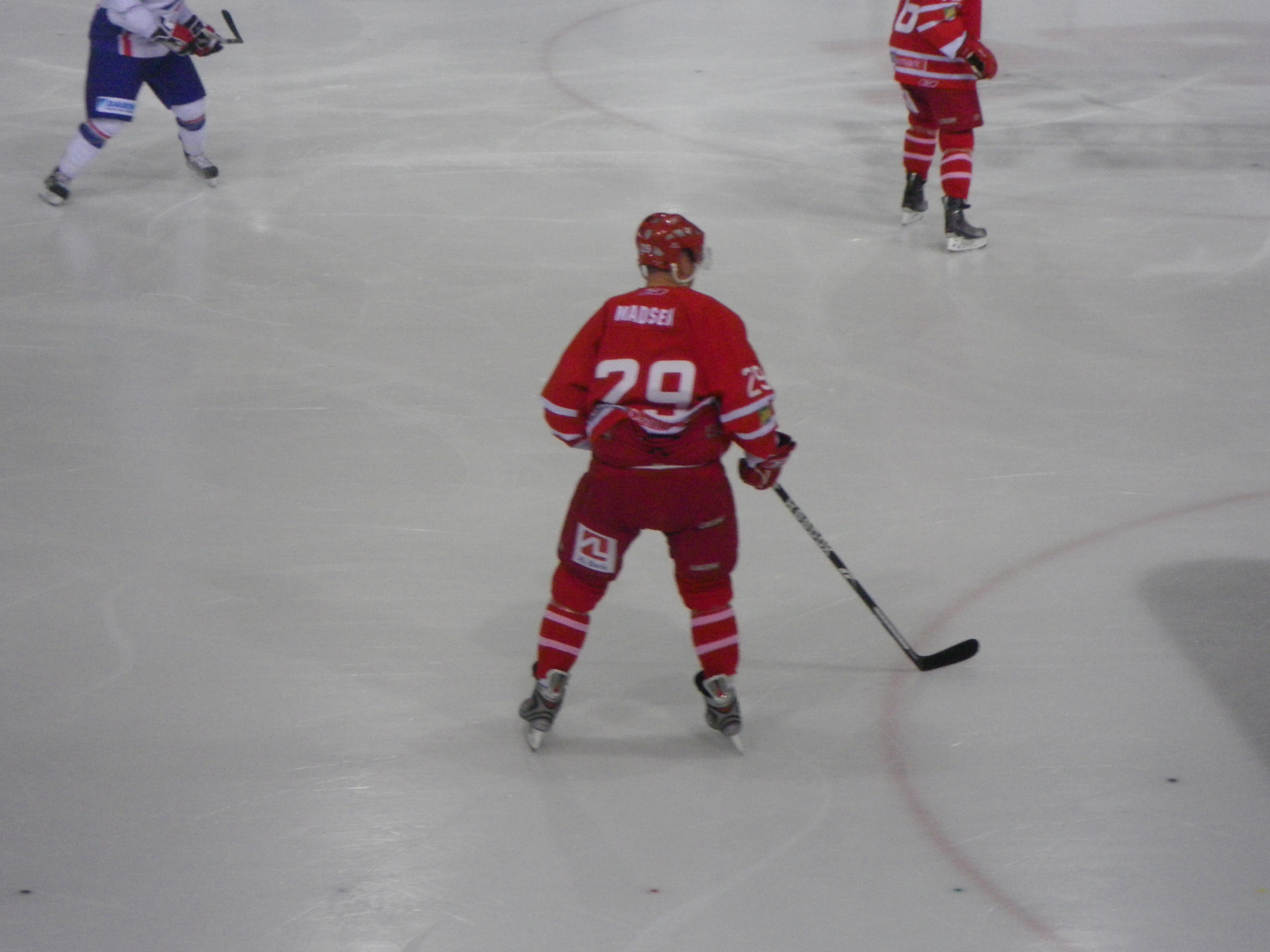
- Born: 16 January 1987 (age 39) Rødovre, Denmark
- Height: 1.90 m (6 ft 3 in)
- Weight: 87 kg (192 lb; 13 st 10 lb)
- Position: Left wing
- Shot: Left
- Played for: Frölunda HC; Houston Aeros; Modo Hockey; Hamburg Freezers; Karlskrona HK; Timrå IK
- National team: Denmark
- NHL draft: 122nd overall, 2005; Minnesota Wild
- Playing career: 2005–2022

Morten Madsen (born 16 January 1987) is a Danish former professional ice hockey forward who played most notably in the Swedish Hockey League (SHL).

== Playing career ==
Morten Madsen was drafted by the Minnesota Wild in the 4th round, 122nd overall, in the 2005 NHL entry draft. After being drafted, Madsen joined the Victoriaville Tigres of the QMJHL for the 2006–07 season. In his lone season in the QMJHL, he registered 32 goals and 68 assists for 100 points in 62 games. In six playoff games with the Tigres, he scored three goals and added six assists in six games. Before entering the QMJHL, he played for Frölunda HC's junior team in Sweden. Before moving to Sweden, he played junior hockey for Danish Rødovre Mighty Bulls as well as two games for Rødovre's senior team at the age of 15.

In 2007 Madsen signed a three-year contract with Minnesota Wild in NHL but only got to play with the Houston Aeros in the AHL. After two seasons with Houston, he signed a try-out contract with Modo Hockey in the Swedish Elitserien. His stay with MODO proved successful, and he extended his contract, which now runs until the end of the 2012–13 season. Prior to the 2010–11 season, he was named an alternate captain for the Örnsköldsvik team.

After four seasons with Modo, Madsen left out of contract to sign a deal in Germany with the Hamburg Freezers of the Deutsche Eishockey Liga on 8 April 2013. In March 2015, he signed a fresh three-year deal with the Freezers. The organization folded in May 2016, making Madsen and the entire squad free agents. On 27 June 2016, he signed with Karlskrona HC of the Swedish Hockey League (SHL).

Following completion of the 2021–22 season with Timrå IK, Madsen announced his retirement after 17 professional seasons; however, he would remain with Timrå IK in stepping into Sports Coordinator and Scout role.

== International play ==
Madsen was a member of Team Denmark at the 2006 World Championships in Riga, Latvia. He would play in three games without registering a point.

In December 2006, Madsen played a key role as the Danish team, playing on home ice in Odense, gained promotion from the World Junior Ice Hockey Championships Pool I to the top flight for the first time ever. Madsen was the top scorer for the Danish team, notching two goals and seven assists in 5 games.

In 2007, Madsen was once again a member of Team Denmark at the 2007 World Championships in Moscow, Russia. He played in 5 games, scoring one goal.

== Career statistics ==
=== Regular season and playoffs ===
			Regular season					Playoffs
Season	Team	League	GP	G	A	Pts	PIM	GP	G	A	Pts	PIM
2002–03	Rødovre Mighty Bulls	DEN	2	0	0	0	0	—	—	—	—	—
2003–04	Västra Frölunda HC	J18 Allsv	11	13	8	21	0	7	3	1	4	4
2003–04	Västra Frölunda HC	J20	16	3	2	5	0	1	0	0	0	0
2004–05	Frölunda HC	J18 Allsv	2	1	2	3	0	6	7	7	14	6
2004–05	Frölunda HC	J20	32	7	14	21	14	6	3	2	5	0
2005–06	Frölunda HC	J20	36	10	32	42	60	7	5	3	8	4
2005–06	Frölunda HC	SEL	5	0	0	0	2	—	—	—	—	—
2006–07	Victoriaville Tigres	QMJHL	62	32	68	100	86	6	3	6	9	4
2007–08	Houston Aeros	AHL	50	3	17	20	18	3	1	0	1	0
2007–08	Texas Wildcatters	ECHL	5	0	0	0	0	—	—	—	—	—
2008–09	Houston Aeros	AHL	56	6	16	22	33	—	—	—	—	—
2009–10	Modo Hockey	SEL	45	11	9	20	58	—	—	—	—	—
2010–11	Modo Hockey	SEL	55	14	15	29	6	—	—	—	—	—
2011–12	Modo Hockey	SEL	49	11	5	16	10	6	0	0	0	0
2012–13	Modo Hockey	SEL	55	11	8	19	4	5	0	0	0	0
2013–14	Hamburg Freezers	DEL	51	10	27	37	53	11	2	2	4	0
2014–15	Hamburg Freezers	DEL	49	16	17	33	12	7	3	1	4	6
2015–16	Hamburg Freezers	DEL	50	11	9	20	10	—	—	—	—	—
2016–17	Karlskrona HK	SHL	52	1	14	15	12	—	—	—	—	—
2017–18	Karlskrona HK	SHL	50	3	4	7	16	—	—	—	—	—
2018–19	Timrå IK	SHL	49	3	4	7	18	—	—	—	—	—
2019–20	Timrå IK	Allsv	50	15	20	35	12	1	0	0	0	2
2020–21	Timrå IK	Allsv	40	8	5	13	28	15	2	0	2	22
2021–22	Timrå IK	SHL	35	1	1	2	2	—	—	—	—	—
SHL totals			395	55	60	115	128	11	0	0	0	0
AHL totals			106	9	33	42	51	3	1	0	1	0
DEL totals			150	37	53	90	75	18	5	3	8	6

=== International ===
Year	Team	Event	GP	G	A	Pts	PIM
2004	Denmark	WJC18	6	3	5	8	2
2005	Denmark	WJC D1	5	2	2	4	6
2005	Denmark	WJC18	6	2	2	4	2
2006	Denmark	WJC D1	5	3	2	5	8
2006	Denmark	WC	3	0	0	0	0
2007	Denmark	WJC D1	5	2	7	9	2
2007	Denmark	WC	5	1	0	1	4
2008	Denmark	WC	6	1	1	2	4
2009	Denmark	WC	6	1	2	3	2
2010	Denmark	WC	7	2	2	4	6
2011	Denmark	WC	6	0	1	1	2
2012	Denmark	WC	7	2	0	2	6
2013	Denmark	OGQ	3	0	2	2	2
2013	Denmark	WC	7	2	2	4	2
2014	Denmark	WC	7	0	2	2	2
2015	Denmark	WC	7	0	4	4	2
2016	Denmark	WC	8	1	2	3	4
2016	Denmark	OGQ	3	1	0	1	0
2017	Denmark	WC	7	2	0	2	0
2018	Denmark	WC	7	0	0	0	2
2019	Denmark	WC	7	1	1	2	0
2021	Denmark	WC	7	0	0	0	0
2021	Denmark	OGQ	1	0	0	0	0
2022	Denmark	OG	5	0	0	0	0
Junior totals			27	12	18	30	20
Senior totals			109	14	19	33	38
