= Johan Harju =

Swedish ice hockey player

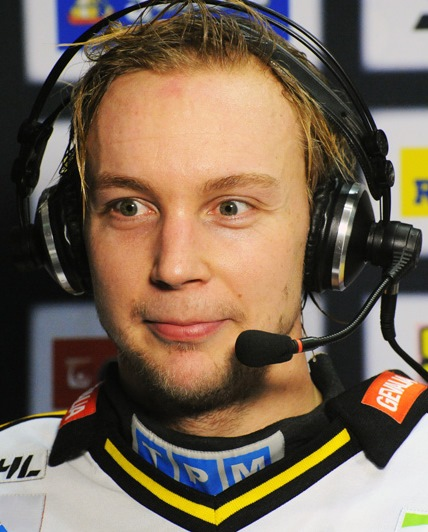
- Born: 15 May 1986 (age 40) Övertorneå, Sweden
- Height: 6 ft 3 in (191 cm)
- Weight: 209 lb (95 kg; 14 st 13 lb)
- Position: Centre
- Shot: Left
- Played for: Luleå HF; HC Dynamo Moscow; Tampa Bay Lightning; Brynäs IF; Jokerit; HC Dynamo Pardubice; Jukurit; HC Pustertal Wölfe
- National team: Sweden
- NHL draft: 167th overall, 2007; Tampa Bay Lightning
- Playing career: 2004–2023

Johan Per Harju (born 15 May 1986) is a Swedish former professional ice hockey forward who last played with HC Pustertal Wölfe of the ICE Hockey League (ICEHL). He was selected by the Tampa Bay Lightning in the 6th round (167th overall) of the 2007 NHL entry draft.

== Playing career ==
On 8 April 2009 Harju left Helsingin Jokerit of the KHL and signed as a free agent with HC Dynamo Moscow of the Kontinental Hockey League (KHL).

On 6 April 2010 the Tampa Bay Lightning signed Harju to a one-year, entry-level contract. He scored his first NHL goal on 7 December 2010 against Miikka Kiprusoff of the Calgary Flames. Following the conclusion of the 2010–11 season, Harju returned to play for Luleå HF.

== Career statistics ==
=== Regular season and playoffs ===
			Regular season					Playoffs
Season	Team	League	GP	G	A	Pts	PIM	GP	G	A	Pts	PIM
2002–03	Luleå HF	J18 Allsv	11	7	2	9	14	—	—	—	—	—
2002–03	Luleå HF	J20	7	2	0	2	0	—	—	—	—	—
2003–04	Luleå HF	J18 Allsv	3	1	3	4	0	7	4	3	7	8
2003–04	Luleå HF	J20	35	14	12	26	8	—	—	—	—	—
2004–05	Luleå HF	J20	33	18	13	31	14	7	2	2	4	2
2004–05	Luleå HF	SEL	4	0	0	0	0	—	—	—	—	—
2004–05	Piteå HC	Allsv	1	0	0	0	0	—	—	—	—	—
2005–06	Luleå HF	J20	17	14	9	23	4	4	3	1	4	8
2005–06	Luleå HF	SEL	39	3	1	4	8	4	0	0	0	20
2006–07	Luleå HF	SEL	55	12	10	22	30	4	2	0	2	4
2007–08	Luleå HF	SEL	51	20	8	28	55	—	—	—	—	—
2008–09	Luleå HF	SEL	55	27	22	49	30	5	4	1	5	0
2009–10	Dynamo Moscow	KHL	55	4	14	18	38	2	1	0	1	8
2010–11	Norfolk Admirals	AHL	63	23	30	53	20	6	1	0	1	6
2010–11	Tampa Bay Lightning	NHL	10	1	2	3	2	—	—	—	—	—
2011–12	Luleå HF	SEL	53	15	10	25	16	5	1	1	2	0
2012–13	Brynäs IF	SEL	55	18	10	28	16	4	0	0	0	0
2013–14	Brynäs IF	SHL	55	19	9	28	20	5	2	1	3	2
2014–15	Jokerit	KHL	26	3	4	7	8	—	—	—	—	—
2014–15	Luleå HF	SHL	14	7	5	12	4	9	3	1	4	0
2015–16	Luleå HF	SHL	49	11	17	28	16	11	1	5	6	0
2016–17	Luleå HF	SHL	52	8	18	26	10	2	0	2	2	0
2017–18	Luleå HF	SHL	48	13	13	26	12	3	2	0	2	2
2018–19	Luleå HF	SHL	52	11	6	17	24	10	0	1	1	27
2019–20	HC Dynamo Pardubice	ELH	48	7	10	17	10	—	—	—	—	—
2020–21	Modo Hockey	Allsv	34	10	22	32	16	—	—	—	—	—
2021–22	HC Pustertal Wölfe	ICEHL	49	19	26	45	18	3	1	0	1	4
2022–23	Jukurit	Liiga	12	1	1	2	4	—	—	—	—	—
2022–23	HC Pustertal Wölfe	ICEHL	27	4	6	10	16	—	—	—	—	—
2025–26	Övertorneå HF	SWE.5	1	4	2	6	0	—	—	—	—	—
SHL totals			582	164	129	293	241	62	15	12	27	55
NHL totals			10	1	2	3	2	—	—	—	—	—

=== International ===
Year	Team	Event	Result	GP	G	A	Pts	PIM
2009	Sweden	WC	3rd place, bronze medalist(s)	9	2	2	4	4
2010	Sweden	WC	3rd place, bronze medalist(s)	9	4	1	5	4
Senior totals				18	6	3	9	8
