= Jonas Andersson (ice hockey) =

Swedish ice hockey player (born 1981)

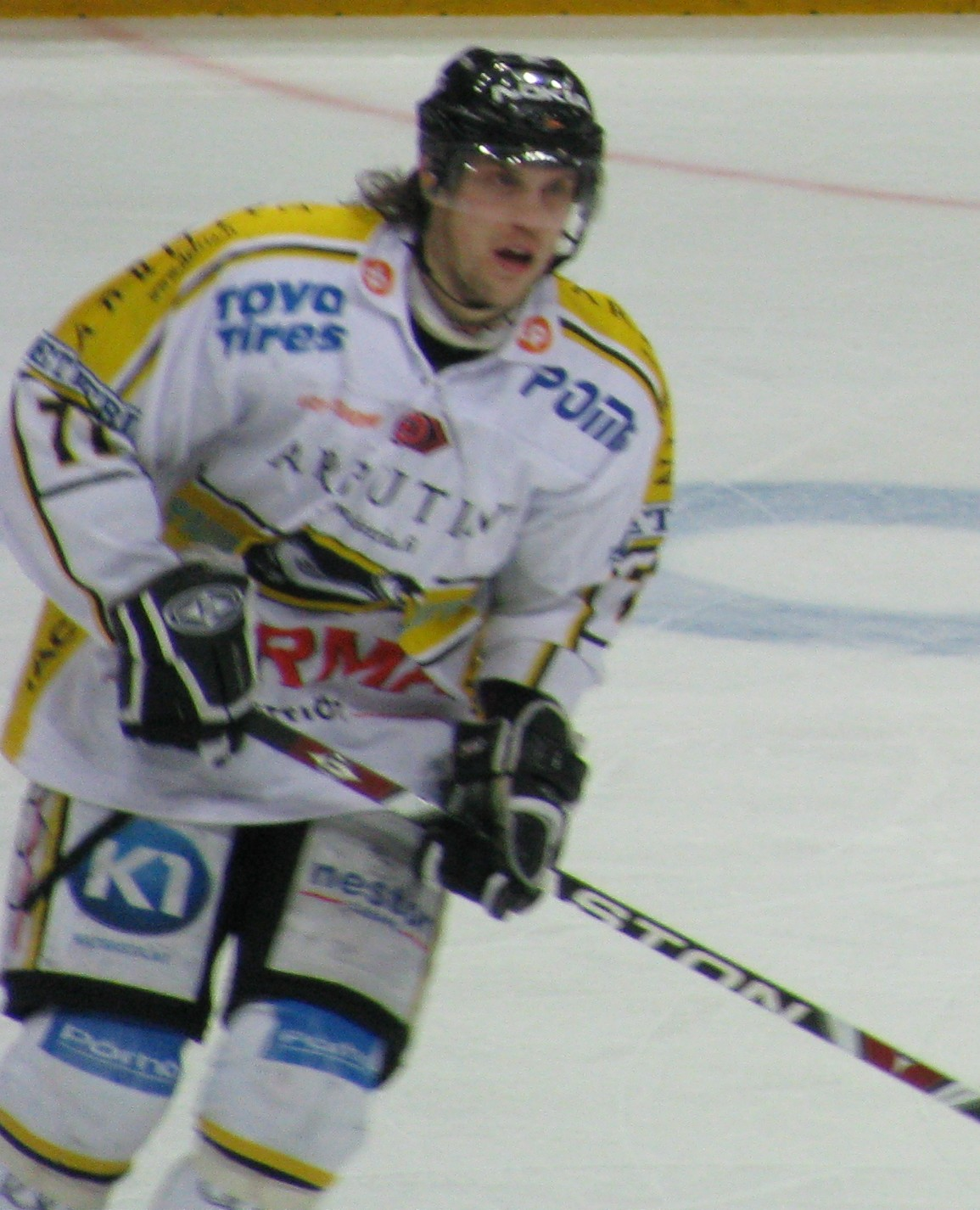
- Born: 24 February 1981 (age 45) Lidingö, Sweden
- Height: 6 ft 3 in (191 cm)
- Weight: 212 lb (96 kg; 15 st 2 lb)
- Position: Right wing
- Shot: Left
- Played for: Nashville Predators; Södertälje SK; Brynäs IF; Ilves; HPK; Kärpät; HC Dinamo Minsk; Vancouver Canucks; Ak Bars Kazan; Atlant Moscow Oblast; Torpedo Nizhny Novgorod; Yugra Khanty-Mansiysk
- National team: Sweden
- NHL draft: 33rd overall, 1999; Nashville Predators
- Playing career: 2000–2015

Jonas Erik Andersson (born 24 February 1981) is a Swedish former professional ice hockey player. Most of his career was spent playing in the SM-liiga, the top league in Finland, though he also briefly played for the Nashville Predators and Vancouver Canucks of the National Hockey League (NHL). Andersson played internationally for Sweden at both the junior and senior level, including the 2010 World Championship.

== Playing career ==
Andersson was selected 33rd overall in the second round of the 1999 NHL entry draft by the Nashville Predators after playing two years in the Swedish J20 SuperElit with AIK.

Andersson immediately started his North American career the next season playing junior in the Ontario Hockey League with the North Bay Centennials scoring an impressive point per game to be named OHL All-Star Game and earning selection to the OHL First All-Rookie Team. He played the majority of his North American professional career with the Predators' minor league affiliate the Milwaukee Admirals, but played five games for Nashville in the 2001–02 NHL season.

Andersson failed to live up to his draft status since being picked, being part of the poor 1–2 punch that the Preds selected in 1999, following goaltender Brian Finley. He went back to Sweden in 2004, playing for Södertälje SK and Brynäs IF in Elitserien during the NHL lockout.

He then moved to the Finnish SM-liiga, playing for Ilves in 2005 and HPK in 2006 and 2007. He was traded to Kärpät mid-season and subsequently won the SM-liiga Championship. During the final series against Espoo, Andersson was the leading scorer with three goals and three assists in five games. In his first full season with Kärpät in 2008–09, Jonas broke out offensively to lead the team with 24 goals to finish second overall in the league.

On 16 April 2009, Andersson left the SM-liiga after four seasons and signed a one-year contract with HC Dinamo Minsk of the Kontinental Hockey League. In just 30 games with Dinamo he, posted 20 points on a checking line, earning a selection to make his senior international debut at the 2010 IIHF World Championship. Impressive two-way play made Jonas a standout on the Swedish team with a team leading 6 goals to help capture the Bronze medal.

On 1 July 2010, Andersson signed as a free agent on a one-year contract to return to the Nashville Predators of the NHL after seven seasons, however prior to his return with the Predators he was traded to the Vancouver Canucks along with Ryan Parent in exchange for Shane O'Brien and Dan Gendur.

Andersson was recalled to the NHL to play for the Canucks in a home game against the Anaheim Ducks on 8 December 2010. It was his first game in the NHL since the 2001–02 NHL season when he skated in five games for the Predators.

== Career statistics ==
=== Regular season and playoffs ===
			Regular season					Playoffs
Season	Team	League	GP	G	A	Pts	PIM	GP	G	A	Pts	PIM
1997–98	AIK	J20	33	14	16	30	32	—	—	—	—	—
1998–99	AIK	J20	16	3	7	10	18	—	—	—	—	—
1999–2000	North Bay Centennials	OHL	67	31	36	67	27	6	2	2	4	2
1999–2000	Milwaukee Admirals	IHL	2	1	0	1	0	2	0	0	0	2
2000–01	Milwaukee Admirals	IHL	52	6	7	13	44	5	0	0	0	2
2001–02	Milwaukee Admirals	AHL	71	13	17	30	19	—	—	—	—	—
2001–02	Nashville Predators	NHL	5	0	0	0	2	—	—	—	—	—
2002–03	Milwaukee Admirals	AHL	49	7	4	11	12	5	0	1	1	4
2004–05	Leksands IF	Allsv	27	5	1	6	22	—	—	—	—	—
2004–05	Södertälje SK	SEL	34	0	4	4	8	—	—	—	—	—
2004–05	Brynäs IF	SEL	7	2	0	2	2	—	—	—	—	—
2005–06	Ilves	SM-l	48	8	10	18	26	4	2	0	2	0
2006–07	HPK	SM-l	23	6	7	13	20	9	0	1	1	8
2007–08	HPK	SM-l	42	11	13	24	42	—	—	—	—	—
2007–08	Kärpät	SM-l	13	1	7	8	4	10	3	7	10	4
2008–09	Kärpät	SM-l	56	24	33	57	54	15	6	4	10	10
2009–10	Dinamo Minsk	KHL	30	7	13	20	12	—	—	—	—	—
2010–11	Manitoba Moose	AHL	20	5	6	11	16	—	—	—	—	—
2010–11	Vancouver Canucks	NHL	4	0	0	0	0	—	—	—	—	—
2010–11	Ak Bars Kazan	KHL	7	1	3	4	0	3	0	0	0	0
2011–12	Atlant Moscow Oblast	KHL	54	15	10	25	24	12	1	1	2	2
2012–13	Atlant Moscow Oblast	KHL	33	10	7	17	6	—	—	—	—	—
2012–13	Torpedo Nizhny Novgorod	KHL	10	2	1	3	4	—	—	—	—	—
2013–14	HC Yugra	KHL	22	7	5	12	6	—	—	—	—	—
2014–15	Kloten Flyers	NLA	5	1	1	2	0	—	—	—	—	—
SM-l totals			182	50	70	120	146	38	11	12	23	22
KHL totals			156	42	39	81	52	15	1	1	2	2
NHL totals			9	0	0	0	2	—	—	—	—	—

=== International ===
Medal record

Representing Sweden

Ice hockey

World Championships
Bronze medal – third place	2010 Germany	

Year	Team	Event	Result	GP	G	A	Pts	PIM
2001	Sweden	WJC	4th	7	0	0	0	6
2010	Sweden	WC	3rd place, bronze medalist(s)	9	6	0	6	6
Junior totals				7	0	0	0	6
Senior totals				9	6	0	6	6
