= Tomáš Rolinek =

Czech former ice hockey player (born 1980)

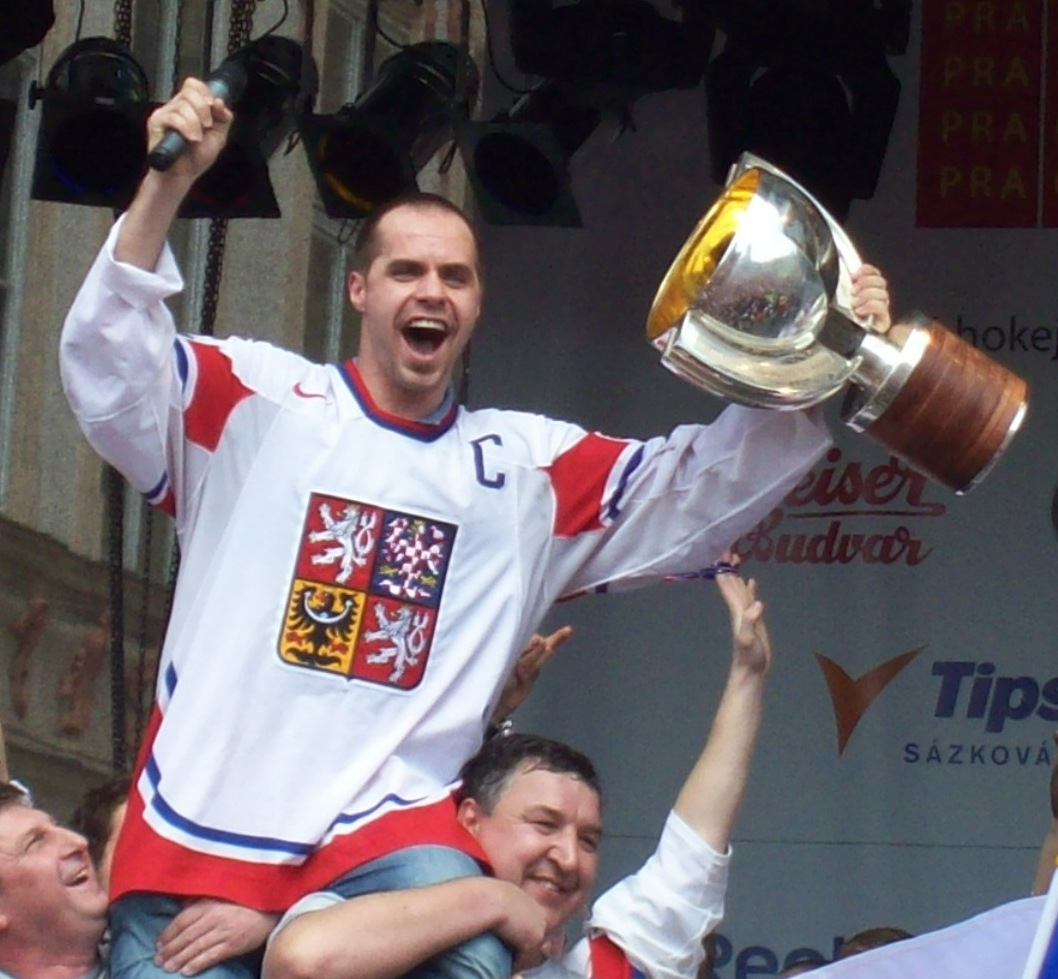
- Born: February 17, 1980 (age 45); Žďár nad Sázavou, Czechoslovakia
- Height: 5 ft 10 in (178 cm)
- Weight: 185 lb (84 kg; 13 st 3 lb)
- Position: Forward
- Shot: Left
- Czech Extraliga team Former teams: HC Dynamo Pardubice; HC Berounští Medvědi; HC Vajgar Jindřichův Hradec; HC Bílí Tygři Liberec; HC Litvínov; Metallurg Magnitogorsk; Salavat Yulaev Ufa; HC Sparta Praha; HC Stadion Vrchlabí
- National team: Czech Republic
- Playing career: 1999–2020

Tomáš Rolinek (born February 17, 1980, in Žďár nad Sázavou, Czechoslovakia) is a Czech former ice hockey player. He was a forward, and has played for the national team. He won the Extraliga in 2005 with HC Pardubice.

== International career ==
Rolinek played in the 2006, 2007, 2008, 2009, 2010, and 2011 World Championships for the Czech Republic. He captained the team that won the 2010 IIHF World Championship and the team that finished third at the 2011 World Championship. He also played for the national team at the 2010 Winter Olympics.

== Career statistics ==
=== Regular season and playoffs ===
			Regular season					Playoffs
Season	Team	League	GP	G	A	Pts	PIM	GP	G	A	Pts	PIM
1998–99	HC IPB Pojišťovna Pardubice	CZE U20	45	22	24	46		—	—	—	—	—
1998–99	HC IPB Pojišťovna Pardubice	ELH	1	0	0	0	0	—	—	—	—	—
1999–2000	SHC Vajgar Jindřichův Hradec	CZE U20	34	26	25	51	53	—	—	—	—	—
1999–2000	SHC Vajgar Jindřichův Hradec	CZE.2	23	3	3	6	14	—	—	—	—	—
2000–01	HC IPB Pojišťovna Pardubice	CZE U20	14	17	6	23	32	4	5	6	11	8
2000–01	HC IPB Pojišťovna Pardubice	ELH	30	4	7	11	10	7	3	2	5	8
2000–01	HC Berounští Medvědi	CZE.2	15	7	11	18	18	3	1	2	3	0
2001–02	HC IPB Pojišťovna Pardubice	ELH	50	12	7	19	26	6	1	2	3	27
2001–02	Bílí Tygři Liberec	CZE.2	1	0	0	0	0	—	—	—	—	—
2002–03	HC ČSOB Pojišťovna Pardubice	ELH	40	12	10	22	18	8	0	0	0	6
2003–04	Bílí Tygři Liberec	ELH	13	5	3	8	8	—	—	—	—	—
2003–04	HC Chemopetrol, a.s.	ELH	35	3	4	7	18	—	—	—	—	—
2004–05	HC Moeller Pardubice	ELH	42	2	6	8	32	11	1	1	2	12
2004–05	HC VČE Hradec Králové, a.s.	CZE.2	4	1	0	1	2	—	—	—	—	—
2005–06	HC Moeller Pardubice	ELH	42	15	14	29	32	—	—	—	—	—
2006–07	HC Moeller Pardubice	ELH	47	16	18	34	69	17	7	3	10	6
2007–08	HC Moeller Pardubice	ELH	48	16	16	32	34	—	—	—	—	—
2008–09	Metallurg Magnitogorsk	KHL	54	24	15	39	28	12	5	3	8	26
2009–10	Metallurg Magnitogorsk	KHL	55	20	14	34	22	9	3	2	5	33
2010–11	Metallurg Magnitogorsk	KHL	54	14	15	29	26	15	6	5	11	2
2011–12	Metallurg Magnitogorsk	KHL	52	10	14	24	22	11	3	2	5	8
2012–13	Salavat Yulaev Ufa	KHL	23	3	3	6	8	—	—	—	—	—
2012–13	HC ČSOB Pojišťovna Pardubice	ELH	15	4	5	9	4	5	0	1	1	4
2013–14	HC Sparta Praha	ELH	43	18	16	34	12	11	2	5	7	10
2014–15	HC Sparta Praha	ELH	49	16	11	27	24	10	1	4	5	10
2015–16	HC Dynamo Pardubice	ELH	33	5	6	11	8	—	—	—	—	—
2016–17	HC Dynamo Pardubice	ELH	45	17	18	35	20	—	—	—	—	—
2017–18	HC Dynamo Pardubice	ELH	49	13	22	35	66	7	1	5	6	4
2018–19	HC Dynamo Pardubice	ELH	45	7	10	17	24	—	—	—	—	—
2019–20	HC Dynamo Pardubice	ELH	17	1	2	3	8	—	—	—	—	—
2019–20	HC Stadion Vrchlabí	CZE.3	10	7	7	14	4	—	—	—	—	—
ELH totals			644	166	175	341	413	82	16	23	39	87
KHL totals			238	71	61	132	106	47	17	12	29	69

=== International ===
Tomáš Rolinek
Medal record

Representing Czech Republic

World Championships
Silver medal – second place	2006 Riga	Ice hockey
Gold medal – first place	2010 Cologne	Ice hockey
Bronze medal – third place	2011 Bratislava	Ice hockey

Year	Team	Event	GP	G	A	Pts	PIM
2006	Czech Republic	WC	8	0	0	0	2
2007	Czech Republic	WC	3	0	0	0	0
2008	Czech Republic	WC	7	2	1	3	2
2009	Czech Republic	WC	7	1	2	3	10
2010	Czech Republic	OG	5	1	0	1	0
2010	Czech Republic	WC	9	4	1	5	12
2011	Czech Republic	WC	9	1	2	3	6
2014	Czech Republic	WC	10	1	1	2	2
Senior totals			58	10	7	17	34
