= Rádio Expres =

Slovak radio station

Slovakia
- Frequencies: 32 different FM frequencies, available also on internet and selected cable providers

Programming
- Language: Slovak
- Format: Hot AC

Ownership
- Owner: Bauer Media Group

History
- First air date: December 31, 1999

Links
- Website: www.expres.sk

Rádio Expres is the most listened-to commercial radio station in Slovakia. Since 2013, it has been operated by the Bauer Media Group, which also owns the stations Melody, Europa 2, and Rock. The radio began broadcasting on December 31, 1999, as it was legally required to start broadcasting by that date. Full-scale broadcasting began on January 1, 2000.

== Broadcasting ==
The format of the radio is Hot AC, and its target audience is primarily listeners aged 20 to 40 with a middle or higher education. The radio emphasizes news and music, playing mostly contemporary music, but also featuring shows dedicated to music from the 70s, 80s, and 90s. In addition to domestic and international news, weather reports and traffic updates are dominant components of the news coverage.

The radio broadcasts terrestrially almost exclusively through a network of transmitters operated by Expres Net k.s., with advertising space managed by BAUER MEDIA SLOVAKIA, k.s. Besides nationwide advertisements, it also airs regional spots divided into regions such as Bratislava, South, Trenčín, Žilina, Central, Tatry, and East. These spots are cheaper and are mainly intended for companies targeting people in a specific region.

Most of the day (from 6:00 am to 10:00 pm) consists of broadcasts composed of news (every hour), traffic updates (every half-hour and every 20 minutes from 6:00 am to 9:00 am), and on weekdays, short news segments every half-hour from 7:30 am to 4:30 pm, along with hosts' segments and music. The programming is divided into several blocks, each hosted by a different presenter. The segments are more entertainment-oriented, and the broadcast includes specialized shows like hit parades.

== Transmitters ==
The signal transmission for the radio is provided by Expres Net through a network of 50 primarily private transmitters (as of December 2020), with only a few locations using Towercom masts. The broadcaster was the first to begin building a nationwide network of low-power transmitters in 2000, placed at suitable, lower-lying locations near settlements. Gradually, this network of transmitters was developed, locally providing program transmission for other stations as well.
