= Papa =

Papa is a word used in many languages as an affectionate term for father or grandfather.

Papa or PAPA may refer to:

== Geography and geology ==
- Papa, Samoa, a village on the island of Savai'i
- Papa, Scotland, various islands
- Pápa, a town in Hungary
- Papa rock, a Māori-derived term for a blue-grey mudstone common in New Zealand

== People ==
- Papa (nickname), a list of people
- Papa (surname)
- Papa bar Aggai (3rd century), Bishop of Seleucia-Ctesiphon and a founding figure in the Church of the East
- Papa, a monk martyred with Abda and Abdisho

== Mythology and religion ==
- Rangi and Papa, the primordial parents according to Māori mythology
- Papa (mythology), the earth goddess in Cook Islands mythology
- Papa, Latin for Pope, the bishop of Rome and leader of Catholic Church
- Pāpa, a concept associated with sins in Hinduism and other Indian religions

== Arts and entertainment ==
=== Film and television ===
- Papa (TV series), a 1996 South Korean drama series
- Papa (2012 Egyptian film), a 2012 Egyptian drama film
- Papa (2012 South Korean film), a 2012 South Korean comedy-drama film
- Papa: Hemingway in Cuba, a 2015 Canadian-American biographical film about Ernest Hemingway and shot in Cuba
- Papa (2016 film), a Chinese comedy-drama film
- Papa (2018 film), an American drama film
- Papa (2024 film), a Hong Kong family drama film

=== Music ===
- "Papa" (song), from the BBC drama Gideon's Daughter
- "Papa" (Prince song), a 1994 song from Come by Prince
- "Pa-Pa", a song from Hell of a Tester by The Rasmus

== Organizations ==
- British Amateur Press Association (comics fandom), an amateur press association which first published under the name PAPA
- Professional and Amateur Pinball Association

== Other uses ==
- PAPA syndrome, a genetic disorder in humans
- Papa, the letter P in the NATO and ICAO phonetic alphabets, as well as other spelling alphabets
- Papa-class Soviet submarines, the sole member being Soviet submarine K-222
- Papa, the Spanish word for potato, used in the names of numerous Latin American potato-based dishes
- Parallax Aircraft Parking Aid, a device that indicates where pilots should stop in a stand
- Station P, an oceanographic measure station often called Station Papa

== See also ==
- Mama and papa, in linguistics, a commonly seen sequence of sounds meaning "mother" and "father"
- Papas or Pappas, a common Greek surname
- Pappa (disambiguation)
- Paw Paw (disambiguation)
