= 2009 IIHF World Championship rosters =

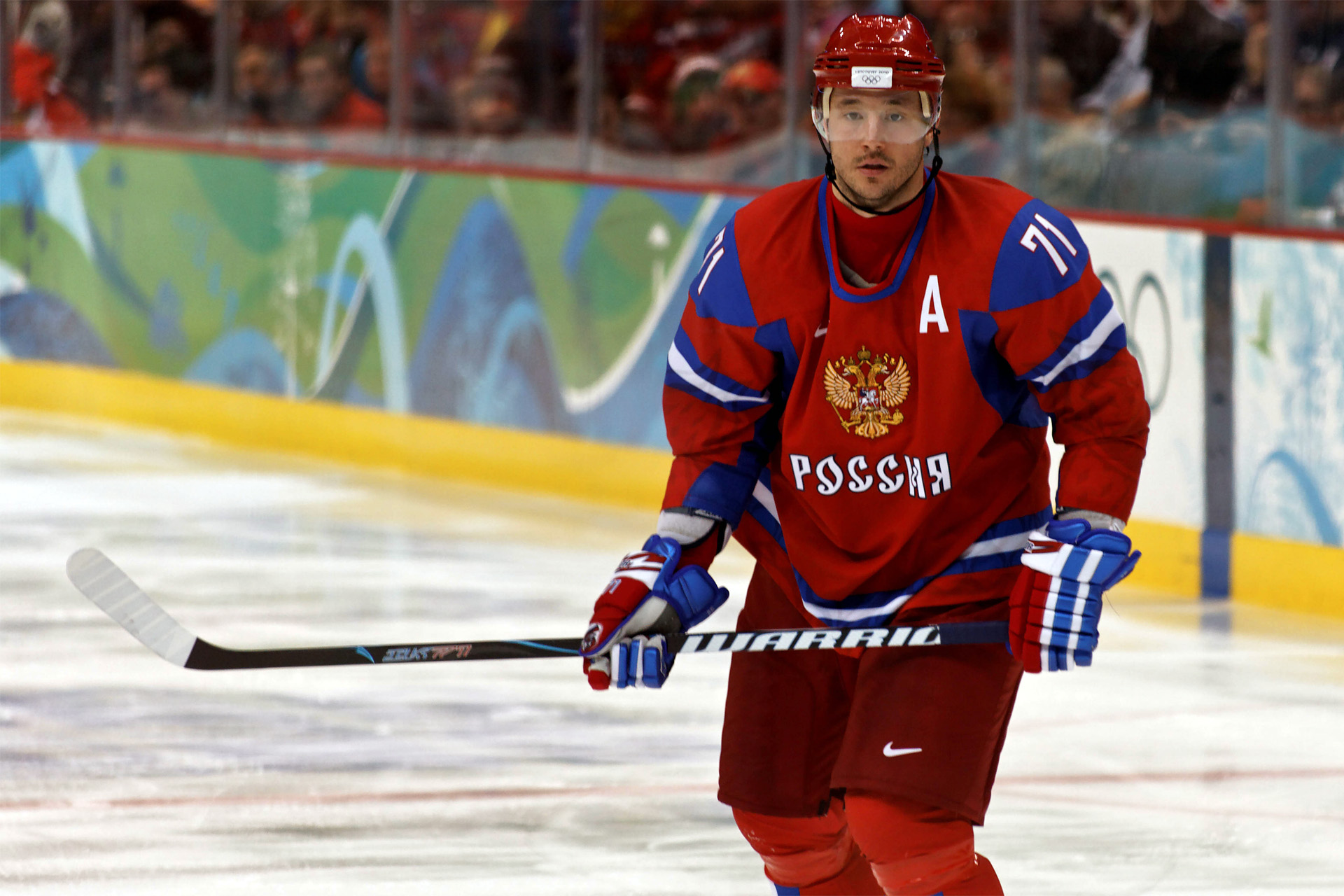
Ilya Kovalchuk of Russia was named the tournament's most valuable player as well as best forward.

The 2009 IIHF World Championship rosters consisted of 396 players from 16 national ice hockey teams. Run by the International Ice Hockey Federation (IIHF), the 2009 IIHF World Championship, held in Bern and Zurich-Kloten, Switzerland, was the 73rd edition of the tournament. Russia won the championship, the third time they had done so; it was their 25th championship if it is included with those won by the Soviet Union team.

Before the start of the championship, each participating nation had to submit a list of players for its roster. A minimum of fifteen skaters and two goaltenders and a maximum of twenty skaters and three goaltenders had to be selected. A country that had selected fewer than the maximum allowed must have chosen the remaining players prior to the start of the tournament. After the start of the tournament, each team was allowed to select an additional two players to their roster, for a maximum of 25 players. Once players were registered to the team, they could not be removed from the roster.

To qualify for a national team under IIHF rules, a player must meet several criteria. He must be a citizen of the nation, and be under the jurisdiction of that national association. Players are allowed to switch which national team they play for, providing they fulfill the IIHF criteria. If participating for the first time in an IIHF event, the player would have had to play two consecutive years in the national competition of the new country without playing in another country. If the player has already played for a national team before, he may switch countries if he is a citizen of the new country, and has played for four consecutive years in the national competition of the new country. This switch may happen only once in the player's life.

Ilya Kovalchuk of Russia was named the tournament's most valuable player and top forward by the IIHF directorate. Canadian Shea Weber was named top defenceman and Andrei Mezin of Belarus was selected as top goaltender. Canada's Martin St. Louis and Chris Mason were the tournament's leading scorer and goaltender in save percentage respectively.

== Legend ==
General
Number	Uniform number
Club	Player's club before tournament

Positions
F	Forward
D	Defenceman
GK	Goaltender

Statistics
GP	Games played	W	Wins
G	Goals	L	Losses
A	Assists	Min	Minutes played
Pts	Points	GA	Goals against
PIM	Penalties in minutes	GAA	Goals against average
SO	Shutouts	SV%	Save percentage

== Austria ==
- Head coach: (Sweden) Lars Bergström (SWE)

=== Skaters ===
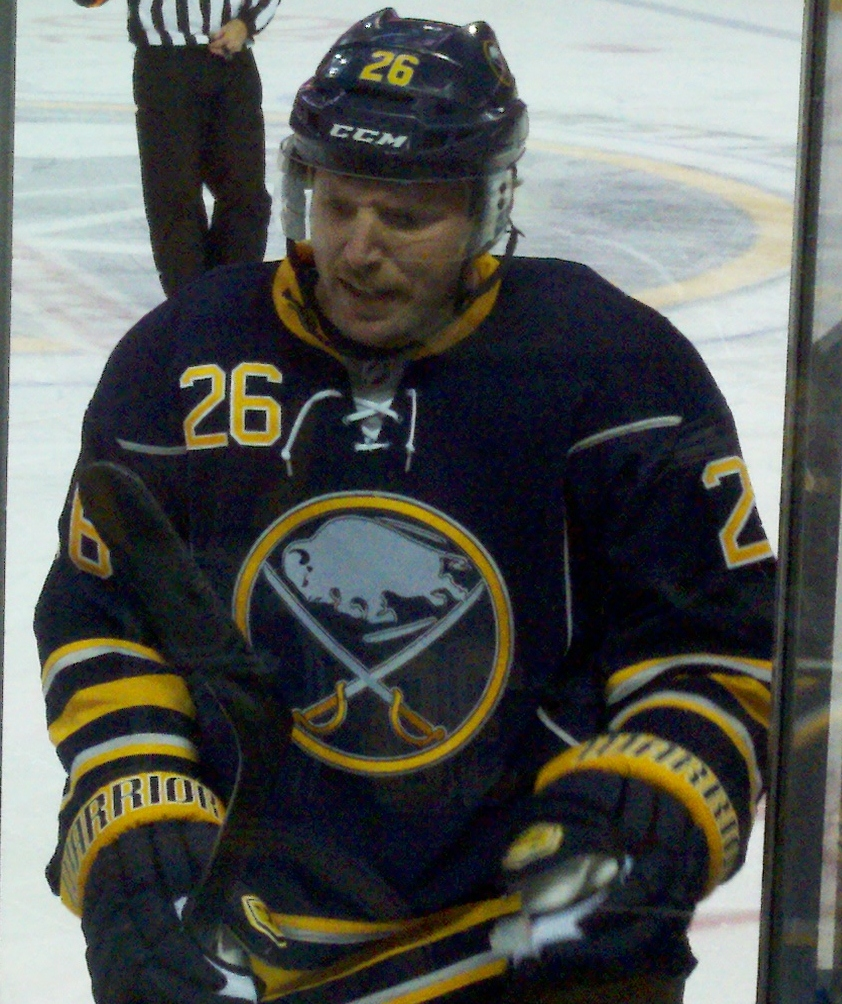
With four points in six games, Thomas Vanek finished second in scoring for Austria.

Number	Position	Player	Club	GP	G	A	Pts	PIM
41	D	Mario Altmann	Vienna Capitals	3	0	0	0	0
79	F	Gregor Baumgartner	EC VSV Villach	6	0	1	1	2
61	F	Christoph Harand	EC KAC Klagenfurt	3	0	0	0	2
8	F	Roland Kaspitz	EC VSV Villach	6	2	0	2	2
18	F	Thomas Koch	Red Bull Salzburg	6	4	3	7	10
37	F	Andreas Kristler	EC VSV Villach	6	0	0	0	4
32	D	Andre Lakos	Traktor Chelyabinsk	6	0	0	0	14
11	D	Philippe Lakos	TWK Innsbruck	6	0	0	0	6
55	D	Robert Lukas	Black Wings Linz	1	0	0	0	0
14	F	Andreas Nödl	Philadelphia Phantoms	4	0	1	1	4
47	F	Harald Ofner	TWK Innsbruck	3	0	0	0	2
39	D	Martin Oraze	EC VSV Villach	6	1	0	1	2
34	F	Markus Peintner	EC VSV Villach	6	1	0	1	2
12	F	Michael Raffl	EC VSV Villach	2	0	0	0	0
27	D	Jeremy Rebek	Red Bull Salzburg	6	0	0	0	4
91	F	Oliver Setzinger	SCL Tigers Langnau	6	2	1	3	6
15	F	Paul Schellander	EC KAC Klagenfurt	6	0	0	0	2
45	F	David Schuller	EC KAC Klagenfurt	6	0	0	0	8
21	F	Matthias Trattnig	Red Bull Salzburg	6	0	1	1	2
4	D	Gerhard Unterluggauer	TWK Innsbruck	6	0	1	1	4
26	F	Thomas Vanek	Buffalo Sabres	6	1	3	4	2
24	D	Darcy Werenka	Vienna Capitals	6	0	0	0	10

=== Goaltenders ===
Number	Player	Club	GP	W	L	Min	GA	GAA	SV%	SO
30	Bernd Brückler	Espoo Blues	5	2	3	299	13	2.61	0.925	2
29	Jürgen Penker	Rögle BK Angelholm	1	0	1	60	6	6.00	0.842	0
39	Bernhard Starkbaum	EC VSV Villach	0	–	–	–	–	–	–	–

== Belarus ==
- Head coach: (United States) Glen Hanlon (USA)

=== Skaters ===
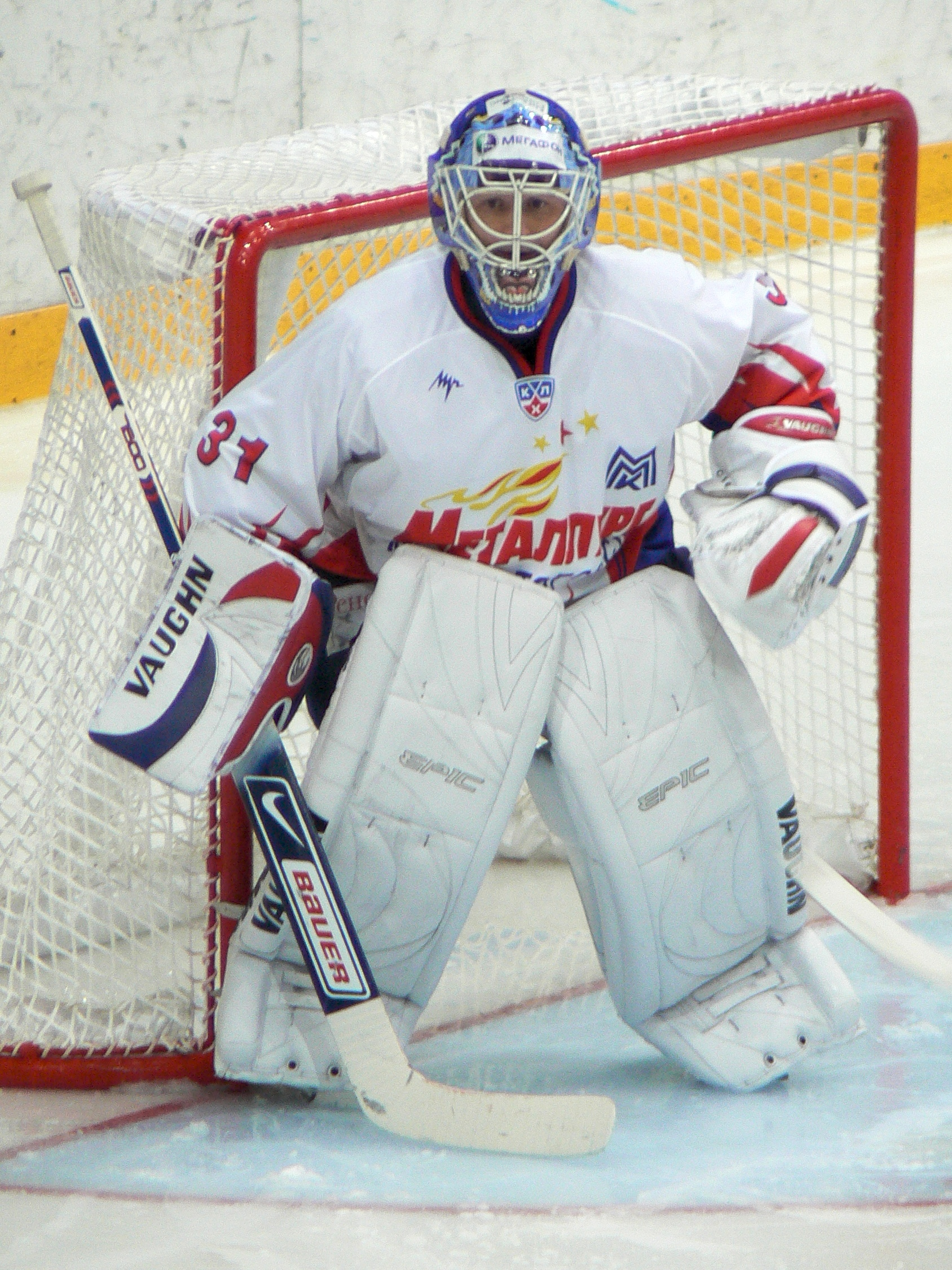
Goaltender Andrei Mezin was named the tournament's best goalkeeper.

Number	Position	Player	Club	GP	G	A	Pts	PIM
10	F	Oleg Antonenko	HK MVD Balashikha	7	3	3	6	2
85	D	Andrei Antonov	Dynamo Minsk	7	0	0	0	2
29	D	Andrei Bashko	Amur Khabarovsk	7	0	1	1	2
68	F	Yaroslav Chupris	Dynamo Minsk	7	0	1	1	0
59	F	Sergei Demagin	Dynamo Minsk	7	1	1	2	4
7	D	Vladimir Denisov	Hartford Wolf Pack	5	0	0	0	6
84	F	Mikhail Grabovski	Toronto Maple Leafs	7	3	6	9	2
71	F	Alexei Kalyuzhny	Dynamo Moscow	5	1	5	6	0
28	F	Konstantin Koltsov	Salavat Yulaev Ufa	5	1	0	1	2
89	D	Dmitri Korobov	Dynamo Minsk	3	0	0	0	0
43	D	Viktor Kostyuchenok	Yunost Minsk	7	0	0	0	10
15	F	Evgeni Kovyrshin	Keramin Minsk	7	0	0	0	4
11	F	Alexander Kulakov	Dynamo Minsk	7	0	0	0	2
4	D	Alexander Makritski	Dynamo Minsk	1	0	0	0	0
19	F	Dmitri Meleshko	Dynamo Minsk	3	0	0	0	4
8	F	Andrei Mikhalev	Dynamo Minsk	7	0	0	0	2
5	D	Alexander Ryadinsky	Yunost Minsk	7	0	0	0	8
24	D	Ruslan Salei	Colorado Avalanche	6	2	3	5	6
23	F	Andrei Stas	Dynamo Minsk	7	1	0	1	6
16	F	Mikhail Stefanovich	Quebec Remparts	4	0	0	0	0
18	F	Alexei Ugarov	HK MVD Balashikha	7	2	0	2	2
3	D	Ivan Usenko	HK Gomel	7	0	0	0	0

=== Goaltenders ===
Number	Player	Club	GP	W	L	Min	GA	GAA	SV%	SO
35	Igor Brikun	HK Gomel	0	–	–	–	–	–	–	–
1	Vitali Koval	HC Dynamo Minsk	2	0	2	120	9	4.50	0.880	0
31	Andrei Mezin	Metallurg Magnitogorsk	5	4	1	314	9	1.72	0.948	0

== Canada ==
- Head coach: (Canada) Lindy Ruff (CAN)

=== Skaters ===
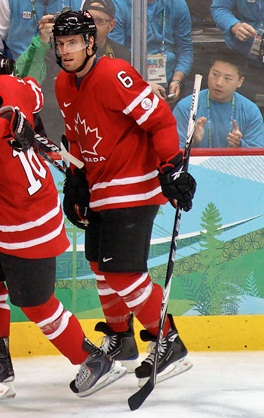
Shea Weber was named the tournament's best defenceman.

Number	Position	Player	Club	GP	G	A	Pts	PIM
20	F	Colby Armstrong	Atlanta Thrashers	9	0	3	3	4
55	D	Braydon Coburn	Philadelphia Flyers	5	0	1	1	4
19	F	Shane Doan	Phoenix Coyotes	9	1	6	7	14
3	D	Drew Doughty	Los Angeles Kings	9	1	6	7	4
12	F	Mike Fisher	Ottawa Senators	9	2	3	5	14
2	D	Dan Hamhuis	Nashville Predators	9	2	2	4	16
15	F	Dany Heatley	Ottawa Senators	9	6	4	10	8
10	F	Shawn Horcoff	Edmonton Oilers	9	1	1	2	6
29	D	Joel Kwiatkowski	Severstal Cherepovets	5	0	0	0	2
18	F	Matthew Lombardi	Phoenix Coyotes	9	2	2	4	6
28	F	James Neal	Dallas Stars	3	1	2	3	2
4	D	Chris Phillips	Ottawa Senators	9	0	3	3	12
9	F	Derek Roy	Buffalo Sabres	9	4	4	8	4
5	D	Luke Schenn	Toronto Maple Leafs	9	0	1	1	0
91	F	Jason Spezza	Ottawa Senators	9	7	4	11	2
26	F	Martin St. Louis	Tampa Bay Lightning	9	4	11	15	2
17	F	Steven Stamkos	Tampa Bay Lightning	9	7	4	11	6
8	F	Scottie Upshall	Phoenix Coyotes	8	0	1	1	27
44	D	Marc-Édouard Vlasic	San Jose Sharks	5	0	0	0	4
6	D	Shea Weber	Nashville Predators	9	4	8	12	6
7	D	Ian White	Toronto Maple Leafs	5	1	2	3	0
16	F	Travis Zajac	New Jersey Devils	5	0	0	0	2

=== Goaltenders ===
Number	Player	Club	GP	W	L	Min	GA	GAA	SV%	SO
37	Josh Harding	Minnesota Wild	0	–	–	–	–	–	–	–
50	Chris Mason	St. Louis Blues	4	4	0	240	4	1.00	0.965	1
30	Dwayne Roloson	Edmonton Oilers	5	3	2	304	11	2.17	0.930	0

== Czech Republic ==
- Head coach: (Czech Republic) Vladimír Růžička (CZE)

=== Skaters ===
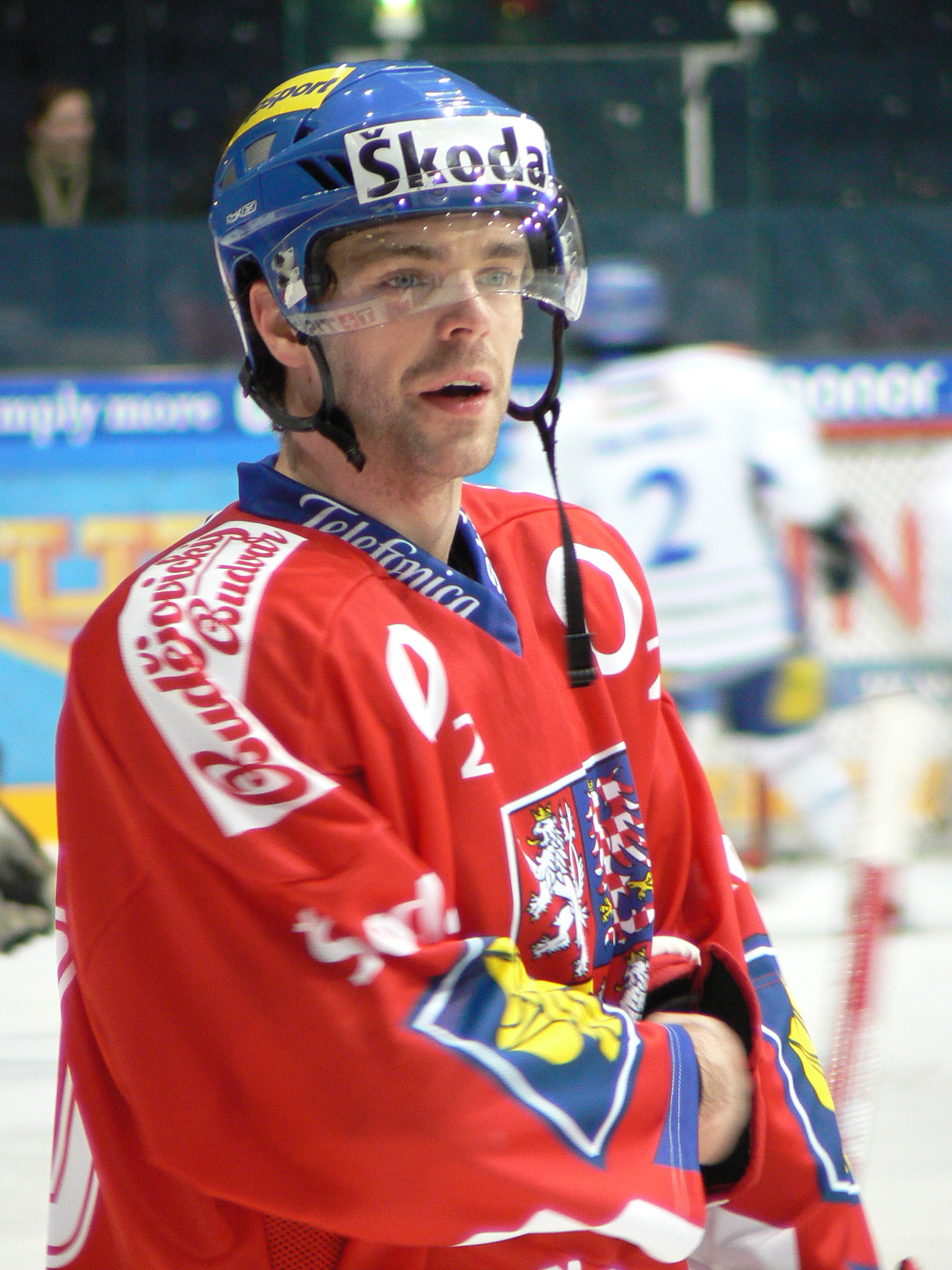
Jakub Klepiš recorded a goal and four assists and finished fourth in team scoring

Number	Position	Player	Club	GP	G	A	Pts	PIM
11	D	Michal Barinka	HC Vítkovice	5	0	0	0	2
44	D	Miroslav Blaťák	Salavat Yulaev Ufa	7	3	1	4	8
16	F	Petr Čajánek	HC Dynamo Moscow	7	5	5	10	10
36	D	Petr Čáslava	HC Pardubice	7	0	2	2	6
10	F	Roman Červenka	HC Slavia Praha	7	2	1	3	2
26	F	Patrik Eliáš	New Jersey Devils	3	2	0	2	2
83	F	Aleš Hemský	Edmonton Oilers	7	2	4	6	4
17	F	Jaroslav Hlinka	Linköpings HC	7	1	2	3	4
24	F	Zbyněk Irgl	Lokomotiv Yaroslavl	5	0	0	0	2
68	F	Jaromír Jágr	Avangard Omsk	7	3	6	9	6
20	F	Jakub Klepiš	Avangard Omsk	7	1	4	5	6
12	F	Aleš Kotalík	Edmonton Oilers	7	2	1	3	4
15	F	Jan Marek	Metallurg Magnitogorsk	5	2	1	3	4
19	F	Milan Michálek	San Jose Sharks	3	1	0	1	4
6	D	Ondřej Němec	HC Karlovy Vary	7	0	1	1	2
85	F	Rostislav Olesz	Florida Panthers	7	0	1	1	2
14	F	Tomáš Plekanec	Montreal Canadiens	7	0	1	1	4
5	D	Roman Polák	St. Louis Blues	7	0	1	1	6
23	D	Karel Rachůnek	Dynamo Moscow	7	0	4	4	2
60	F	Tomáš Rolinek	Metallurg Magnitogorsk	7	1	2	3	10
63	F	Josef Vašíček	Lokomotiv Yaroslavl	6	1	2	3	6
3	D	Marek Židlický	Minnesota Wild	7	0	1	1	6

=== Goaltenders ===
Number	Player	Club	GP	W	L	Min	GA	GAA	SV%	SO
51	Lukas Mensator	Karlovy Vary	0	–	–	–	–	–	–	–
25	Martin Prusek	Dinamo Riga	3	2	1	136	4	1.76	0.920	0
33	Jakub Stepanek	Vítkovice	6	3	3	283	10	2.12	0.907	2

== Denmark ==
- Head coach: (Sweden) Per Bäckman (SWE)

=== Skaters ===
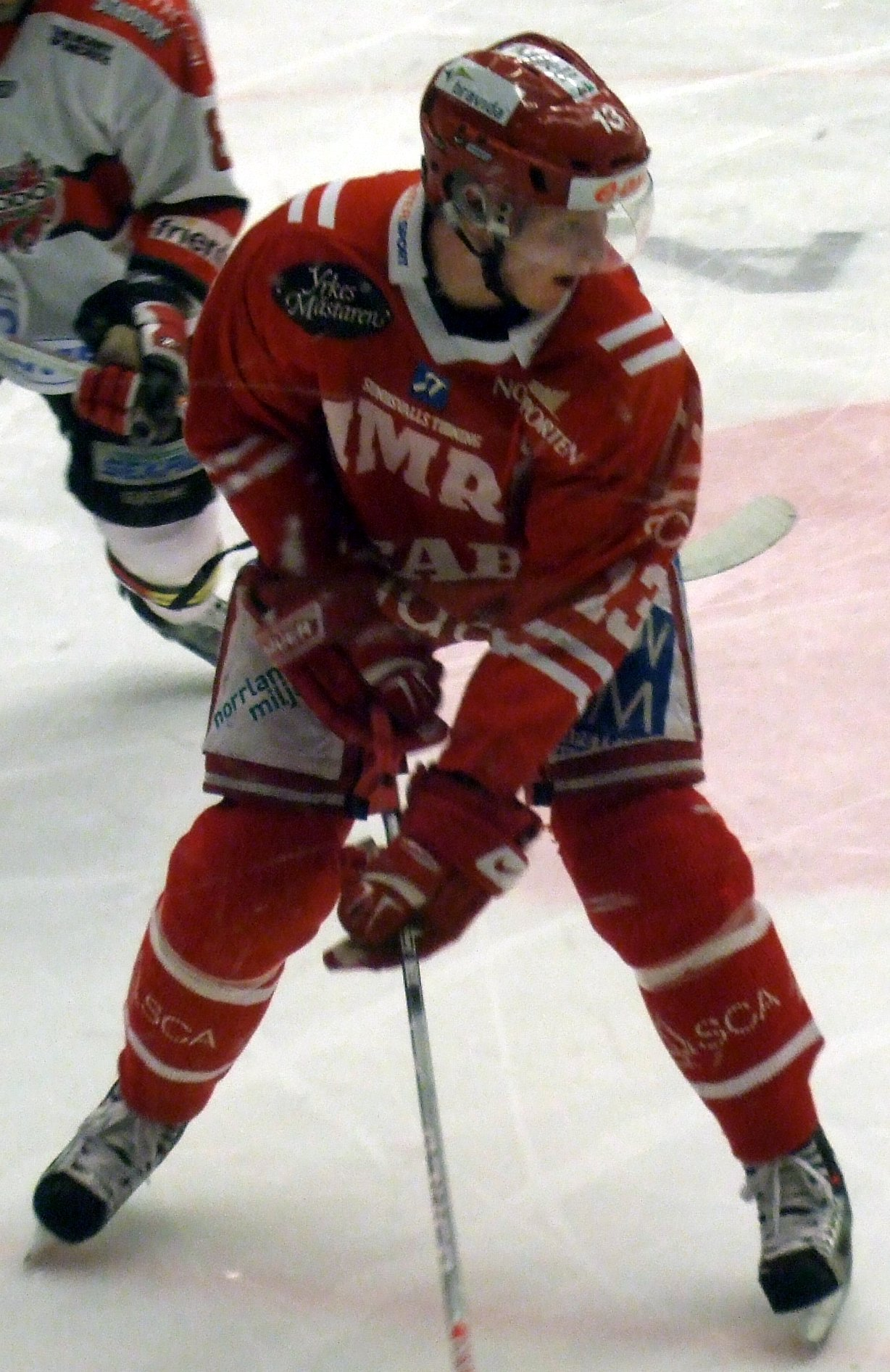
Peter Regin played in all six of Denmark's games, and recorded one goal.

Number	Position	Player	Club	GP	G	A	Pts	PIM
4	D	Mads Bødker	Rögle BK Angelholm	6	0	0	0	2
89	F	Mikkel Bødker	Phoenix Coyotes	6	3	1	4	4
18	F	Mads Christensen	SønderjyskE Vojens	6	2	1	3	2
27	D	Mads Christensen	Frederikshavn White Hawks	6	0	0	0	4
7	D	Jesper Damgaard	Malmö Redhawks	6	1	3	4	10
9	F	Kasper Degn	Bietigheim Steelers	6	1	0	1	0
21	F	Thor Dresler	Herning Blue Fox	6	0	0	0	2
13	F	Morten Green	Leksands IF	6	2	6	8	4
44	F	Nichlas Hardt	Malmö Redhawks	6	2	0	2	4
2	D	Philip Hersby	TOTEMPO HvIK	5	0	0	0	6
33	F	Julian Jakobsen	Odense Bulldogs	6	2	1	3	2
61	F	Jesper Jensen	Frederikshavn White Hawks	3	0	0	0	0
3	D	Philip Larsen	Frölunda HC Gothenburg	6	0	0	0	8
15	F	Kim Lykkeskov	SønderjyskE Vojens	6	0	2	2	2
29	F	Morten Madsen	Houston Aeros	6	1	2	3	2
5	D	Daniel Nielsen	Herning Blue Fox	5	1	1	2	4
12	F	Rasmus Olsen	AaB Aalborg	3	0	0	0	0
25	D	Kasper Pedersen	Frederikshavn White Hawks	6	0	0	0	2
93	F	Peter Regin	Binghamton Senators	6	1	0	1	4
19	F	Kim Staal	Malmö Redhawks	6	1	0	1	2
24	F	Alexander Sundberg	Rødovre Mighty Bulls	6	1	0	1	4

=== Goaltenders ===
Number	Player	Club	GP	W	L	Min	GA	GAA	SV%	SO
30	Frederik Andersen	Herning Blue Fox	0	–	–	–	–	–	–	–
31	Sebastian Dahm	Syracuse Crunch	1	0	1	60	5	5.00	0.868	0
1	Patrick Galbraith	SønderjyskE Vojens	5	3	2	301	14	2.79	0.916	0

== Finland ==
- Head coach: (Finland) Jukka Jalonen (FIN)

=== Skaters ===
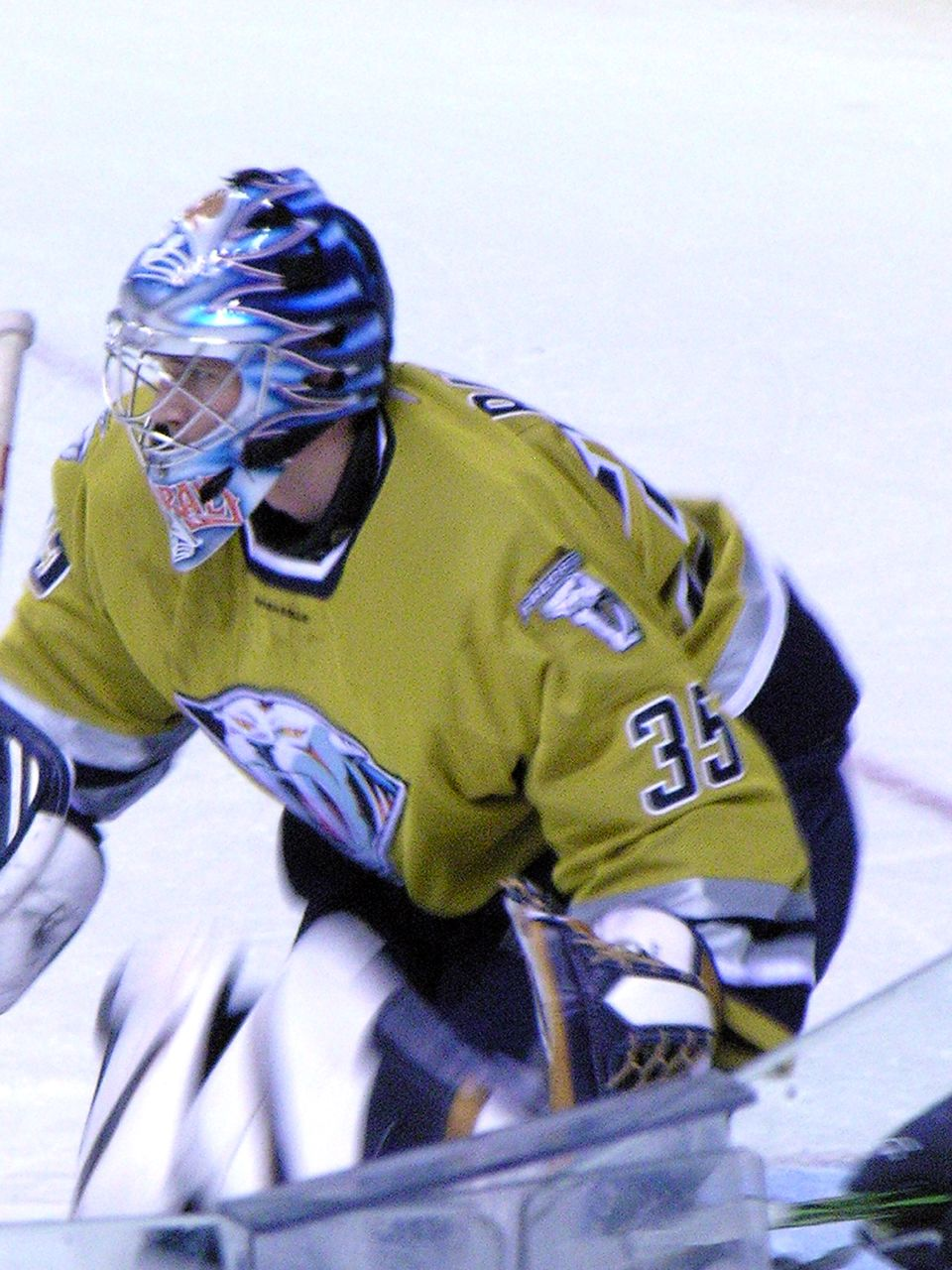
Goaltender Pekka Rinne started six games, winning four including one shutout.

Number	Position	Player	Club	GP	G	A	Pts	PIM
14	F	Niklas Hagman	Toronto Maple Leafs	7	1	5	6	0
51	F	Juha-Pekka Hytönen	JYP Jyvaskyla	7	0	0	0	2
8	F	Hannes Hyvönen	Dinamo Minsk	7	2	4	6	12
26	F	Jarkko Immonen	JYP Jyvaskyla	7	1	4	5	2
6	D	Topi Jaakola	Södertälje SK	7	0	0	0	4
39	F	Niko Kapanen	Ak Bars Kazan	7	7	3	10	2
24	F	Sami Kapanen	Kalpa Kuipio	7	2	3	5	2
29	F	Kalle Kerman	Jokerit Helsinki	6	0	0	0	2
4	D	Ville Koistinen	Nashville Predators	4	1	2	3	4
41	F	Leo Komarov	Pelicans Lahti	5	0	1	1	4
5	D	Lasse Kukkonen	Philadelphia Flyers	6	0	0	0	4
33	D	Mikko Lehtonen	Timrå IK	7	1	0	1	6
20	F	Antti Miettinen	Minnesota Wild	7	3	5	8	6
44	D	Janne Niinimaa	SCL Tigers Langnau	6	0	1	1	16
21	D	Janne Niskala	Frölunda HC	4	1	2	3	2
3	D	Petteri Nummelin	HC Lugano	5	0	3	3	0
49	F	Tuomas Pihlman	JYP Jyvaskyla	6	2	1	3	4
37	F	Mika Pyörälä	Timrå IK	6	1	1	2	0
73	F	Jarkko Ruutu	Ottawa Senators	7	0	2	2	14
28	D	Anssi Salmela	Atlanta Thrashers	7	1	0	1	2
22	F	Tommi Santala	Kloten Flyers	7	0	0	0	4
82	F	Ville Vahalahti	TPS Turku	4	0	0	0	2

=== Goaltenders ===
Number	Player	Club	GP	W	L	Min	GA	GAA	SV%	SO
31	Karri Rämö	Tampa Bay Lightning	1	1	0	60	1	1.00	0.947	0
34	Juuso Riksman	Jokerit Helsinki	0	–	–	–	–	–	–	–
35	Pekka Rinne	Nashville Predators	6	4	2	373	12	1.93	0.926	1

== France ==
- Head coach: (France) David Henderson (FRA)

=== Skaters ===
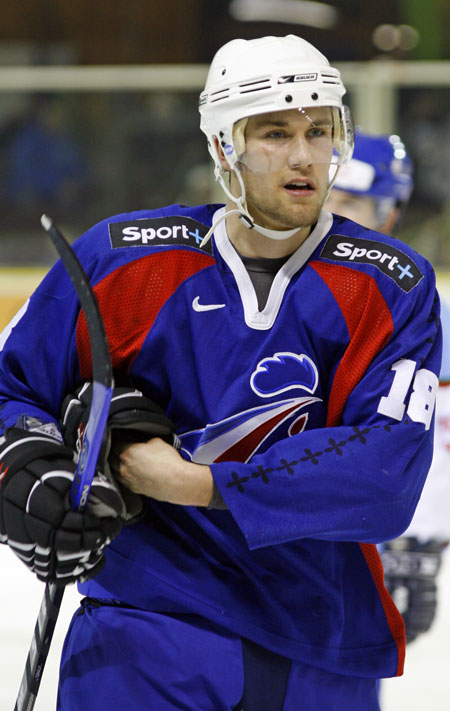
Luc Tardif Jr. played six games for the French team, scoring three goals.

Number	Position	Player	Club	GP	G	A	Pts	PIM
27	D	Baptiste Amar	Grenoble Brûleurs de Loups	6	0	1	1	2
3	D	Vincent Bachet	Gothiques d'Amiens	6	0	1	1	6
41	F	Pierre-Édouard Bellemare	Leksands IF	6	2	1	3	2
14	F	Stéphane da Costa	Sioux City Musketeers	6	0	2	2	0
86	F	Damien Fleury	Grenoble Brûleurs de Loups	6	0	0	0	0
84	F	Kevin Hecquefeuille	Nybro Vikings	6	1	1	2	8
71	D	Kevin Igier	Ducs d'Angers	6	0	0	0	0
28	F	Laurent Gras	HC Morzine-Avoriaz	6	0	0	0	0
72	D	Gary Lévêque	Briançon Alpes Provence HC	3	0	0	0	4
26	F	Anthoine Lussier	HC La Chaux-de-Fonds	6	2	0	2	6
44	D	Antonin Manavian	Grenoble Brûleurs de Loups	6	0	0	0	4
10	F	Laurent Meunier	HC Fribourg-Gotteron	4	0	3	3	14
29	D	Mathieu Mille	HC Morzine-Avoriaz	6	0	0	0	4
21	F	Cyril Papa	Ours de Villard-de-Lans	2	0	0	0	0
16	D	Benoît Quessandier	Dauphins d'Épinal	6	0	0	0	31
20	F	Damien Raux	Briançon Alpes Provence HC	3	0	0	0	2
38	D	Thomas Roussel	Gothiques d'Amiens	6	0	1	1	2
11	F	François Rozenthal	HC Morzine-Avoriaz	6	0	1	1	6
18	F	Luc Tardif	HC Morzine-Avoriaz	6	3	0	3	6
77	F	Sacha Treille	Färjestad BK Karlstad	6	1	0	1	2
7	F	Yorick Treille	HC Vítkovice	6	1	1	2	8
13	F	Jonathan Zwikel	HC Morzine-Avoriaz	6	0	1	1	14

=== Goaltenders ===
Number	Player	Club	GP	W	L	Min	GA	GAA	SV%	SO
92	Henri-Corentin Buysse	Gothiques d'Amiens	0	–	–	–	–	–	–	–
1	Eddy Ferhi	Grenoble Brûleurs de Loups	1	0	1	60	7	7.00	0.833	0
42	Fabrice Lhenry	Esbjerg IK	5	1	4	300	21	4.21	0.885	0

== Germany ==
- Head coach: (Germany) Uwe Krupp (GER)

=== Skaters ===
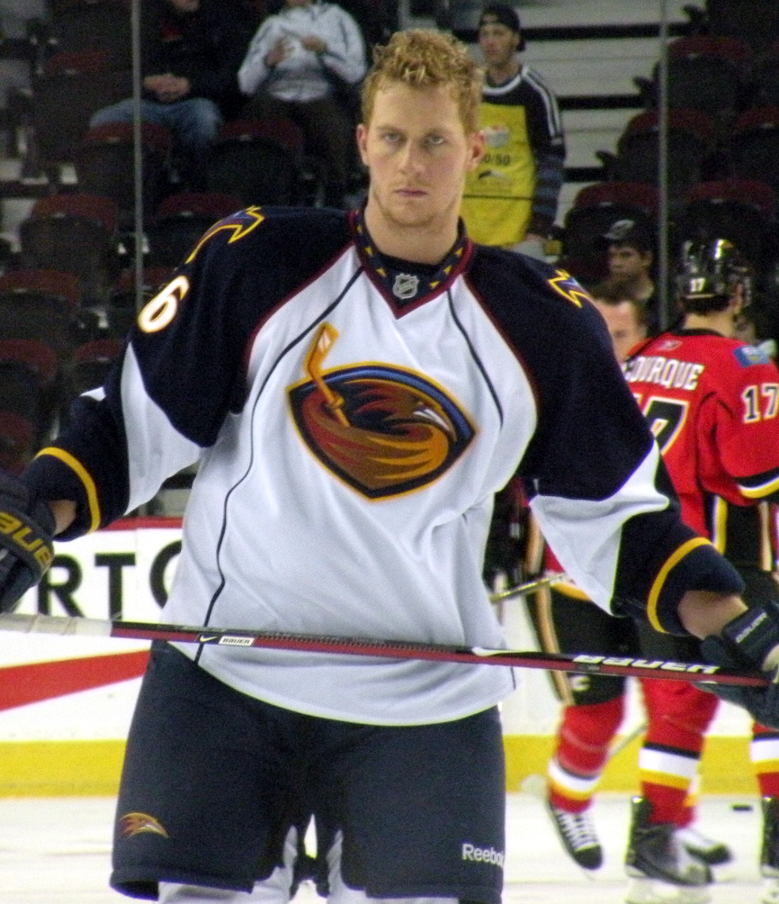
Christoph Schubert played four games, recording two goals, tying for first amongst his team in scoring.

Number	Position	Player	Club	GP	G	A	Pts	PIM
22	D	Michael Bakos	ERC Ingolstadt	6	1	1	2	6
29	F	Alexander Barta	Hamburg Freezers	6	0	0	0	0
6	D	Sven Butenschön	Adler Mannheim	6	0	2	2	2
11	F	Sven Felski	Eisbären Berlin	6	0	0	0	4
77	D	Nicolai Goc	Hannover Scorpions	2	0	0	0	0
87	F	Philip Gogulla	Kölner Haie	6	0	1	1	2
33	F	Michael Hackert	Adler Mannheim	6	0	1	1	4
50	F	Patrick Hager	Krefeld Pinguine	5	0	1	1	2
17	F	Jochen Hecht	Buffalo Sabres	6	1	0	1	4
48	D	Frank Hördler	Eisbären Berlin	6	0	0	0	10
18	F	Kai Hospelt	Grizzly Adams Wolfsburg	6	0	1	1	2
26	F	Daniel Kreutzer	DEG Metro Stars	6	0	0	0	2
91	D	Moritz Müller	Kölner Haie	6	1	0	1	2
15	F	T. J. Mulock	EC Bad Tölz	6	0	0	0	0
8	D	Sebastian Osterloh	Frankfurt Lions	6	0	0	0	2
24	F	André Rankel	Eisbären Berlin	3	0	0	0	2
31	D	Andreas Renz	Kölner Haie	6	0	0	0	8
7	D	Chris Schmidt	Iserlohn Roosters	6	0	0	0	4
13	D	Christoph Schubert	Ottawa Senators	4	2	0	2	6
36	F	Yannic Seidenberg	ERC Ingolstadt	6	0	1	1	4
47	F	Christoph Ullmann	Kölner Haie	6	1	1	2	10
16	F	Michael Wolf	Iserlohn Roosters	6	0	1	1	2

=== Goaltenders ===
Number	Player	Club	GP	W	L	Min	GA	GAA	SV%	SO
44	Dennis Endras	Augsburger Panther	0	–	–	–	–	–	–	–
1	Dimitrij Kotschnew	Spartak Moscow	0	–	–	–	–	–	–	–
32	Dimitri Pätzold	Hannover Scorpions	6	1	5	358	15	2.52	0.905	0

== Hungary ==
- Head coach: (Canada) Pat Cortina (CAN)

=== Skaters ===
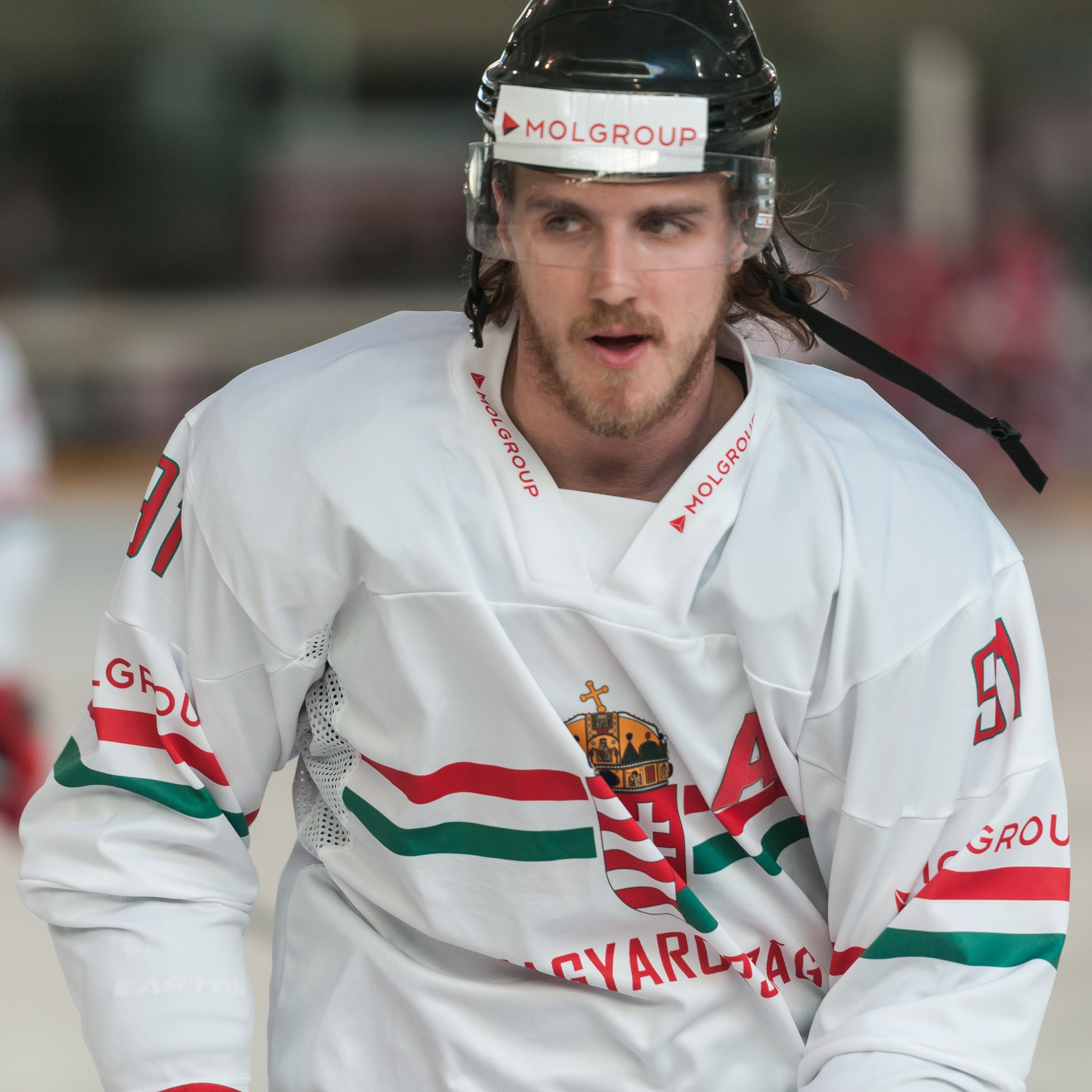
Gergő Nagy played three games for Hungary without registering a point.

Number	Position	Player	Club	GP	G	A	Pts	PIM
9	F	András Benk	Alba Volán SC	2	0	1	1	0
63	D	Omar Ennafatti	Diables Noirs de Tours	6	0	0	0	4
91	F	Dániel Fekete	Alba Volán SC	6	0	1	1	0
22	F	Roger Holéczy	Budapest Stars	6	1	0	1	2
4	D	András Horváth	Alba Volán SC	6	1	0	1	10
13	F	Csaba Jánosi	Ferencváros Budapest	6	0	0	0	0
25	D	Balázs Kangyal	Budapest Stars	6	0	1	1	8
16	F	Dániel Kóger	Red Bull Salzburg	3	0	0	0	2
2	F	Csaba Kovács	Alba Volán	6	0	1	1	2
11	F	Balázs Ladányi	Briançon Alpes Provence	6	0	3	3	0
15	F	Gergely Majoross	Budapest Stars	6	0	0	0	0
98	F	Gergő Nagy	Alba Volán SC	3	0	0	0	0
14	D	Rastislav Ondrejcik	Alba Volán SC	4	0	0	0	6
24	F	Krisztián Palkovics	Alba Volán	6	1	0	1	6
77	F	Imre Peterdi	DAB-Docler	6	2	0	2	0
43	D	Tamás Sille	Budapest Stars	6	1	0	1	14
33	D	Bence Svasznek	Budapest Stars	6	0	0	0	6
5	D	Viktor Szélig	Briançon Alpes Provence HC	6	0	0	0	6
6	D	Viktor Tokaji	Alba Volán SC	6	0	2	2	10
21	F	János Vas	Brynäs IF Gävle	5	0	1	1	29
42	F	Márton Vas	Briançon Alpes Provence HC	6	0	1	1	8
78	F	Artyom Vaszjunyin	Alba Volán SC	6	0	0	0	0

=== Goaltenders ===
Number	Player	Club	GP	W	L	Min	GA	GAA	SV%	SO
1	Krisztián Budai	MHK Kežmarok	0	–	–	–	–	–	–	–
29	Zoltán Hetényi	Alba Volán SC	3	0	3	97	6	3.72	0.917	0
31	Levente Szuper	Alba Volán SC	5	0	5	263	22	5.02	0.901	0

== Latvia ==
- Head coach: (Germany) Oļegs Znaroks (GER)

=== Skaters ===
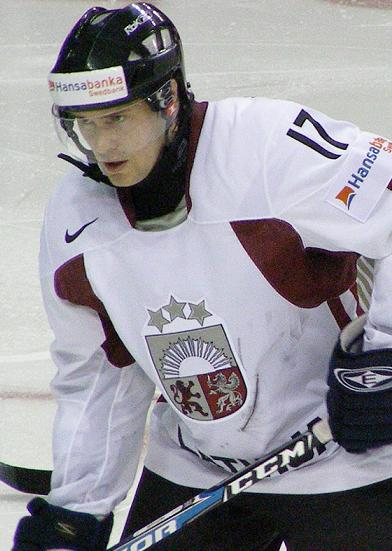
Aleksandrs Ņiživijs recorded three goals and five assists, finishing second in team scoring.

Number	Position	Player	Club	GP	G	A	Pts	PIM
75	F	Ģirts Ankipāns	Dinamo Riga	7	1	2	3	6
3	D	Oskars Bārtulis	Philadelphia Phantoms	4	0	0	0	0
21	F	Armands Bērziņš	Dinamo Riga	7	0	0	0	4
29	F	Aigars Cipruss	Dinamo Riga	7	0	0	0	4
47	F	Mārtiņš Cipulis	Dinamo Riga	7	4	2	6	4
10	F	Lauris Dārziņš	Dinamo Riga	7	2	0	2	18
14	F	Guntis Džeriņš	MHC Martin	7	1	0	1	0
13	D	Guntis Galviņš	Dinamo Riga	7	1	2	3	2
28	F	Roberts Jekimovs	Brynäs IF	4	0	0	0	4
15	D	Aleksandrs Jerofejevs	HC Neftekhimik Nizhnekamsk	7	1	0	1	6
9	F	Mārtiņš Karsums	Tampa Bay Lightning	6	1	3	4	27
2	D	Rodrigo Laviņš	Dinamo Riga	6	0	2	2	4
17	F	Aleksandrs Ņiživijs	Dinamo Riga	7	3	5	8	2
18	D	Georgijs Pujacs	Dinamo Riga	7	0	0	0	10
26	D	Krišjānis Rēdlihs	Dinamo Riga	7	1	0	1	2
19	F	Miķelis Rēdlihs	Dinamo Riga	7	0	2	2	6
16	F	Aleksejs Širokovs	Dinamo Riga	3	0	2	2	0
7	D	Kārlis Skrastiņš	Florida Panthers	7	1	1	2	0
22	D	Oļegs Sorokins	Dinamo Riga	5	0	0	0	2
11	D	Kristaps Sotnieks	Dinamo Riga	7	0	1	1	8
5	F	Jānis Sprukts	Rochester Americans	7	0	1	1	0
12	F	Herberts Vasiļjevs	Krefeld Pinguine	7	3	6	9	6

=== Goaltenders ===
Number	Player	Club	GP	W	L	Min	GA	GAA	SV%	SO
31	Edgars Masaļskis	Füchse Duisburg	7	4	3	426	18	2.53	0.928	1
30	Sergejs Naumovs	Dinamo Riga	0	–	–	–	–	–	–	–
1	Dmitrijs Žabotinskis	HK Liepājas Metalurgs	0	–	–	–	–	–	–	–

== Norway ==
- Head coach: (Norway) Roy Johansen (NOR)

=== Skaters ===
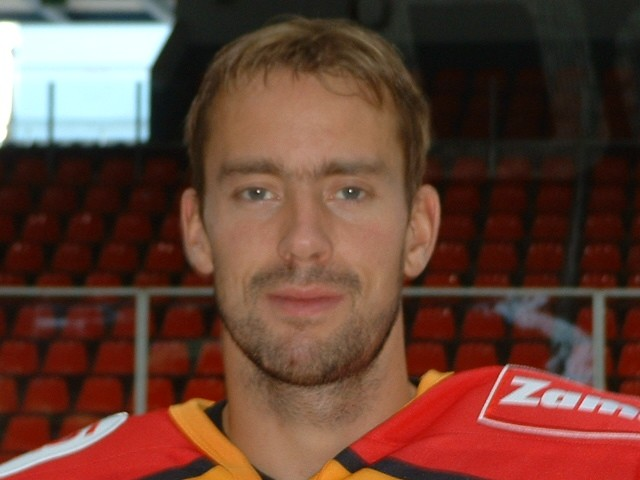
Tore Vikingstad played six games, recording one goal and three assists, finishing first among his team in scoring.

Number	Position	Player	Club	GP	G	A	Pts	PIM
21	F	Morten Ask	Füchse Duisburg	6	0	2	2	10
20	F	Anders Bastiansen	Färjestad BK Karlstad	6	2	1	3	0
47	D	Alexander Bonsaksen	Vålerenga Oslo	6	0	0	0	4
26	F	Kristian Forsberg	Storhamar Dragons	6	0	0	0	4
8	F	Mads Hansen	Brynäs IF	6	0	0	0	12
6	D	Jonas Holøs	Färjestad BK	6	0	0	0	2
9	F	Marius Holtet	Färjestad BK	2	0	0	0	0
7	D	Tommy Jakobsen	Graz 99ers	6	2	1	3	10
5	D	Juha Kaunismäki	Stavanger Oilers	6	0	0	0	4
14	F	Peter Lorentzen	Rögle BK Angelholm	6	0	0	0	0
36	D	Lars Erik Lund	Vålerenga Oslo	6	1	1	2	0
54	D	Anders Myrvold	Stavanger Oilers	6	0	1	1	12
22	F	Martin Røymark	Sparta Warriors	6	0	0	0	0
19	F	Per-Åge Skrøder	MODO Ornskoldsvik	6	0	2	2	4
10	F	Lars Erik Spets	Vålerenga Oslo	6	0	1	1	2
41	F	Patrick Thoresen	Lugano	6	2	0	2	6
23	D	Mats Trygg	Kölner Haie	6	1	0	1	6
29	F	Tore Vikingstad	Hannover Scorpions	6	1	3	4	10
35	F	Martin Laumann Ylven	Linköpings HC	6	0	0	0	6
48	F	Mats Zuccarello Aasen	MODO Ornskoldsvik	6	3	0	3	8

=== Goaltenders ===
Number	Player	Club	GP	W	L	Min	GA	GAA	SV%	SO
33	Pål Grotnes	Stjernen Fredrikstad	5	1	4	242	16	3.97	0.901	0
34	André Lysenstøen	Stavanger Oilers	3	0	3	126	9	4.29	0.871	0
30	Ruben Smith	Storhamar Dragons	0	–	–	–	–	–	–	–

== Russia ==
- Head coach: (Russia) Vyacheslav Bykov (RUS)

=== Skaters ===
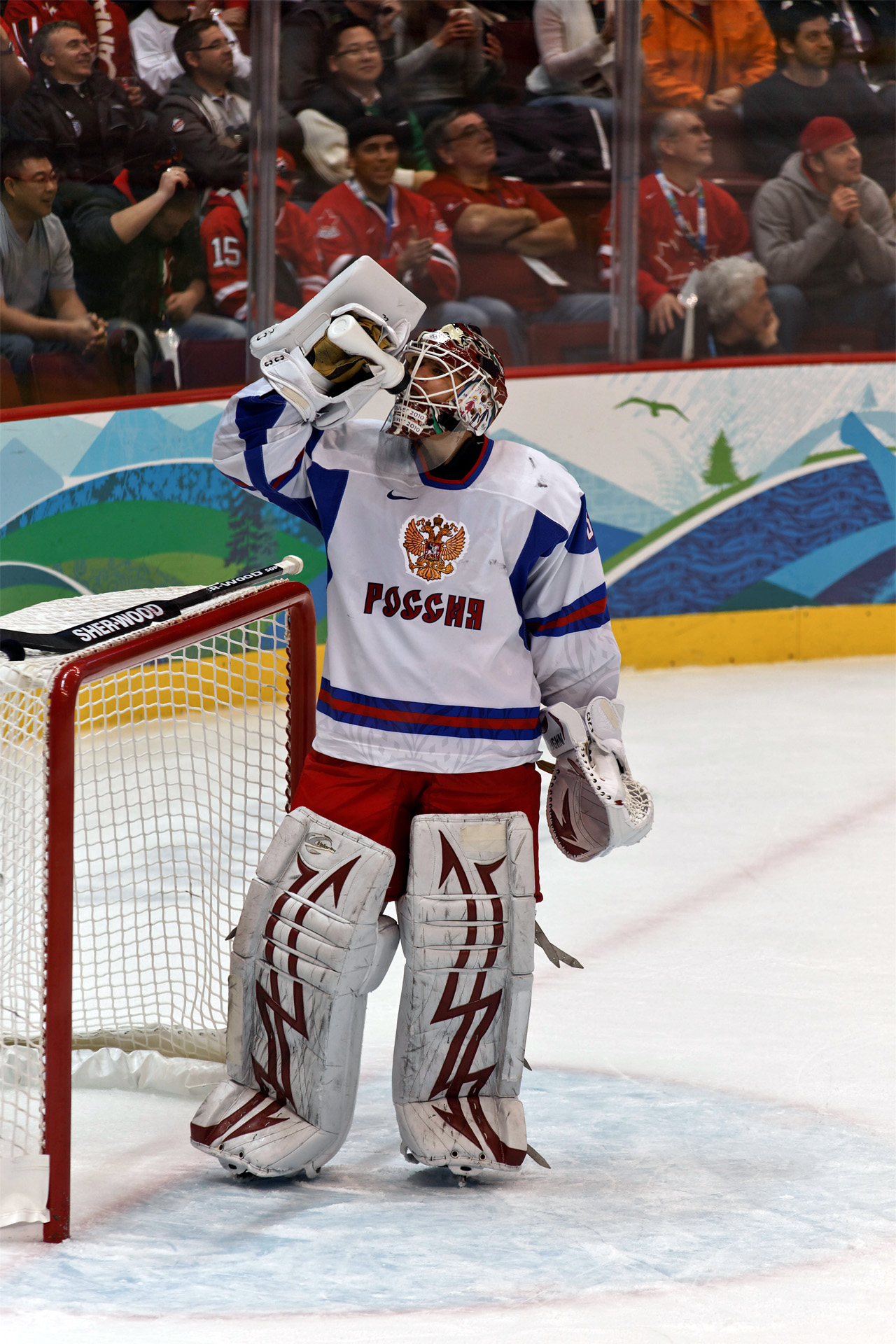
Goaltender Ilya Bryzgalov won all seven of his games, including one shutout.

Number	Position	Player	Club	GP	G	A	Pts	PIM
27	D	Vitaly Atyushov	Metallurg Magnitogorsk	9	2	5	7	0
24	F	Alexander Frolov	Los Angeles Kings	7	3	1	4	2
21	F	Konstantin Gorovikov	SKA Saint Petersburg	9	1	4	5	4
37	D	Denis Grebeshkov	Edmonton Oilers	9	0	2	2	2
7	D	Dmitri Kalinin	Phoenix Coyotes	9	2	3	5	4
22	D	Konstantin Korneyev	CSKA Moscow	6	0	1	1	2
71	F	Ilya Kovalchuk	Atlanta Thrashers	9	5	9	14	4
19	F	Anton Kuryanov	Avangard Omsk	9	3	3	6	6
95	F	Aleksey Morozov	Ak Bars Kazan	9	1	4	5	0
10	F	Sergei Mozyakin	Atlant Moscow Oblast	6	2	2	4	2
5	D	Ilya Nikulin	Ak Bars Kazan	9	1	3	4	4
16	F	Alexander Perezhogin	Salavat Yulaev Ufa	9	3	3	6	6
45	D	Vitali Proshkin	Salavat Yulaev Ufa	9	2	0	2	4
47	F	Alexander Radulov	Salavat Yulaev Ufa	9	4	6	10	10
91	F	Oleg Saprykin	CSKA Moscow	9	4	3	7	0
23	F	Alexei Tereshchenko	Salavat Yulaev Ufa	9	3	2	5	6
70	D	Oleg Tverdovsky	Salavat Yulaev Ufa	9	2	2	4	6
3	D	Vitaly Vishnevskiy	Lokomotiv Yaroslavl	9	0	0	0	29
6	D	Anton Volchenkov	Ottawa Senators	1	0	1	1	0
25	F	Danis Zaripov	Ak Bars Kazan	2	2	1	3	0
13	F	Nikolai Zherdev	New York Rangers	3	0	1	1	0
42	F	Sergei Zinovjev	Dynamo Moscow	9	1	4	5	6

=== Goaltenders ===
Number	Player	Club	GP	W	L	Min	GA	GAA	SV%	SO
30	Ilya Bryzgalov	Phoenix Coyotes	7	7	0	404	14	2.08	0.929	1
1	Alexander Eremenko	Salavat Yulaev Ufa	3	3	0	140	3	1.29	0.947	0
83	Vasiliy Koshechkin	Lada Togliatti	0	–	–	–	–	–	–	–

== Slovakia ==
- Head coach: (Slovakia) Ján Filc (SVK)

=== Skaters ===
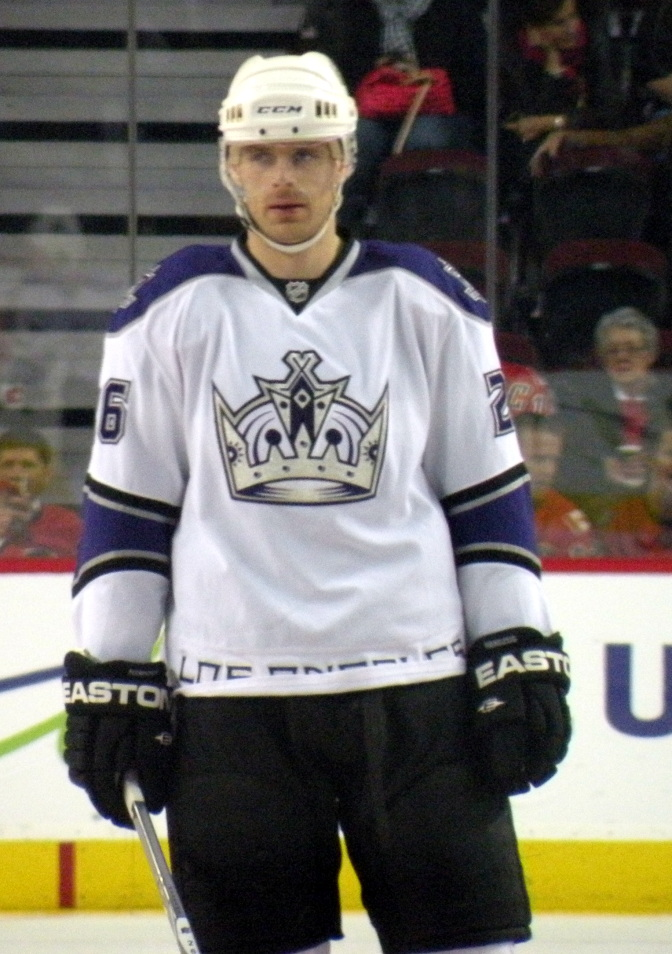
Michal Handzuš recorded four assists and finished second in team scoring.

Number	Position	Player	Club	GP	G	A	Pts	PIM
7	D	Ivan Baranka	HC Spartak Moscow	6	0	1	1	4
23	F	Ľuboš Bartečko	Luleå HF	6	3	0	3	6
10	F	Milan Bartovič	HC Bílí Tygři Liberec	6	0	0	0	2
4	F	Jiří Bicek	EHC Biel	6	0	0	0	2
15	D	Dominik Graňák	Färjestad BK Karlstad	6	1	1	2	2
26	F	Michal Handzuš	Los Angeles Kings	6	0	4	4	6
81	F	Marcel Hossa	Dinamo Riga	6	3	2	5	4
17	F	Michal Macho	MHC Martin	1	0	0	0	0
71	F	Juraj Mikúš	HK 36 Skalica	6	0	1	1	2
27	F	Ladislav Nagy	Severstal Cherepovets	6	1	2	3	2
43	D	Jaroslav Obšut	Luleå HF	6	0	1	1	0
28	F	Peter Ölvecký	Minnesota Wild	5	0	1	1	2
19	F	Rastislav Pavlikovský	HC Sibir Novosibirsk	4	0	0	0	0
92	F	Branko Radivojevič	HC Spartak Moscow	6	0	1	1	4
14	F	Štefan Ružička	HC Spartak Moscow	6	2	1	3	2
44	D	Andrej Sekera	Buffalo Sabres	6	0	2	2	2
6	D	Peter Smrek	HC Plzeň	6	1	0	1	6
20	F	Juraj Štefanka	HC Vítkovice	4	0	0	0	6
34	F	Tomáš Surový	Linköpings HC	5	1	0	1	0
12	D	Ivan Švarný	HC Litvínov	3	0	0	0	0
29	D	René Vydarený	HC České Budějovice	6	0	1	1	0
48	D	Boris Valábik	Atlanta Thrashers	6	0	0	0	16

=== Goaltenders ===
Number	Player	Club	GP	W	L	Min	GA	GAA	SV%	SO
41	Jaroslav Halák	Montreal Canadiens	4	1	3	189	10	3.17	0.872	0
25	Ján Lašák	HC Pardubice	2	0	3	57	10	10.62	0.737	0
31	Rastislav Staňa	Severstal Cherepovets	2	1	1	125	4	1.92	0.889	0

== Sweden ==
- Head coach: (Sweden) Bengt-Åke Gustafsson (SWE)

=== Skaters ===
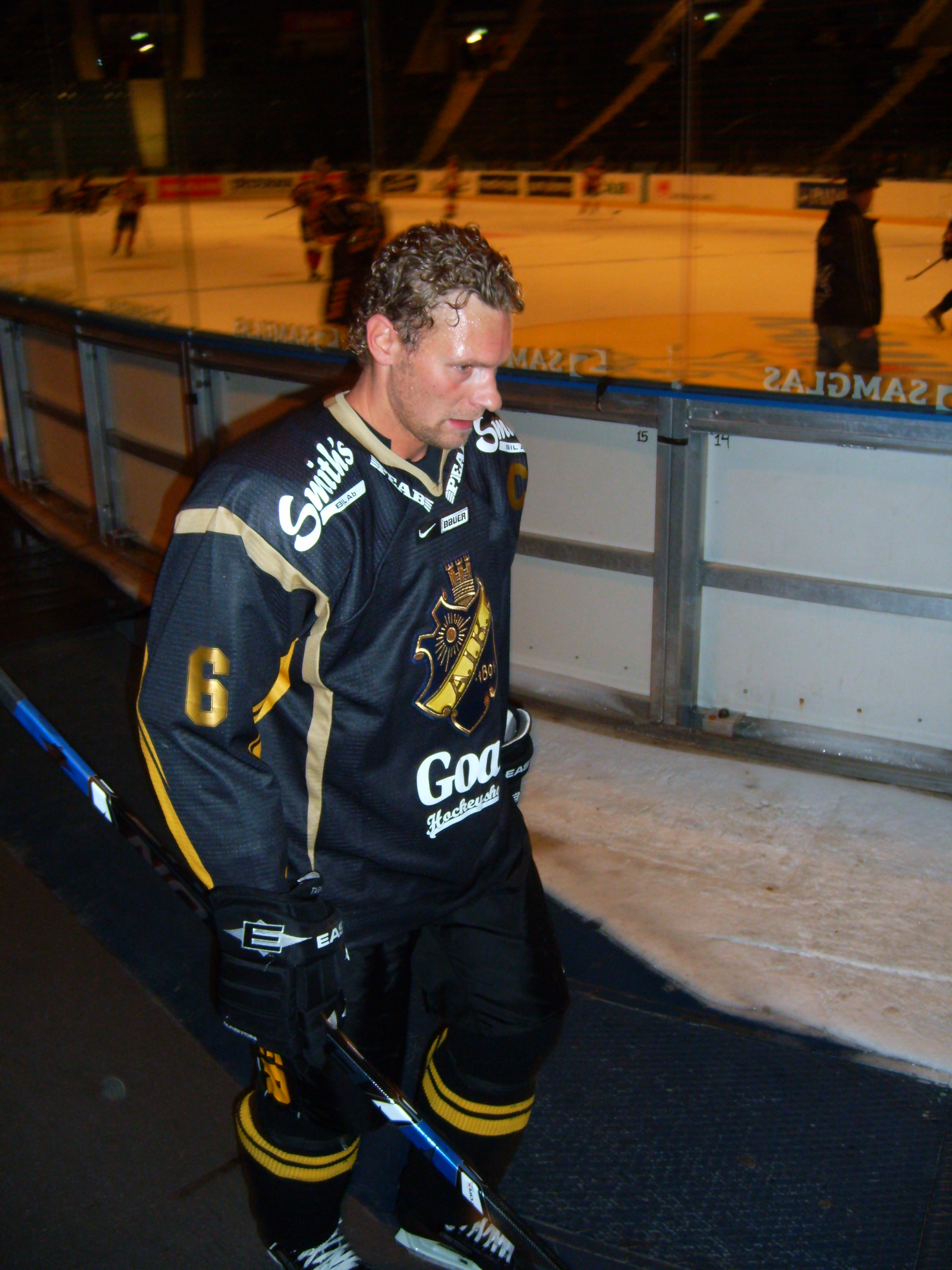
Dick Tärnström led the Swedish team in penalties with 16 PIM.

Number	Position	Player	Club	GP	G	A	Pts	PIM
4	D	Johan Åkerman	Lokomotiv Yaroslavl	9	0	1	1	6
16	F	Johan Andersson	Timrå IK	9	1	1	2	6
14	F	Patrik Berglund	St. Louis Blues	7	0	1	1	0
39	D	Tobias Enström	Atlanta Thrashers	2	0	0	0	0
21	F	Loui Eriksson	Dallas Stars	9	3	4	7	0
2	D	Nicklas Grossmann	Dallas Stars	9	0	1	1	4
11	D	Carl Gunnarsson	Linköpings HC	6	2	0	2	4
24	F	Johan Harju	Luleå HF	9	2	2	4	4
60	F	Kristian Huselius	Columbus Blue Jackets	8	4	3	7	6
6	D	Magnus Johansson	Atlant Moscow Oblast	9	3	5	8	6
29	D	Kenny Jönsson	Rögle BK	9	3	4	7	2
20	F	Joel Lundqvist	Dallas Stars	1	0	0	0	0
9	F	Tony Mårtensson	Ak Bars Kazan	9	1	9	10	8
26	F	Marcus Nilson	Lokomotiv Yaroslavl	9	3	3	6	6
7	D	Johnny Oduya	New Jersey Devils	5	3	1	4	2
23	F	Linus Omark	Luleå HF	9	2	8	10	14
22	F	Niklas Persson	Linköpings HC	9	2	4	6	4
36	D	Anton Strålman	Toronto Maple Leafs	7	1	4	5	6
28	D	Dick Tärnström	AIK IF	8	2	1	3	16
10	F	Martin Thörnberg	HV71	9	0	3	3	2
15	F	Rickard Wallin	Färjestad BK	9	1	0	1	8
80	F	Mattias Weinhandl	HC Dynamo Moscow	9	5	7	12	8

=== Goaltenders ===
Number	Player	Club	GP	W	L	Min	GA	GAA	SV%	SO
50	Jonas Gustavsson	Färjestad BK	5	3	2	276	13	2.83	0.914	0
30	Johan Holmqvist	Frölunda HC	2	1	1	88	4	2.73	0.915	0
1	Stefan Liv	HV71	3	2	1	185	8	2.59	0.900	0

== Switzerland ==
- Head coach: (Germany) Ralph Krueger (GER)

=== Skaters ===
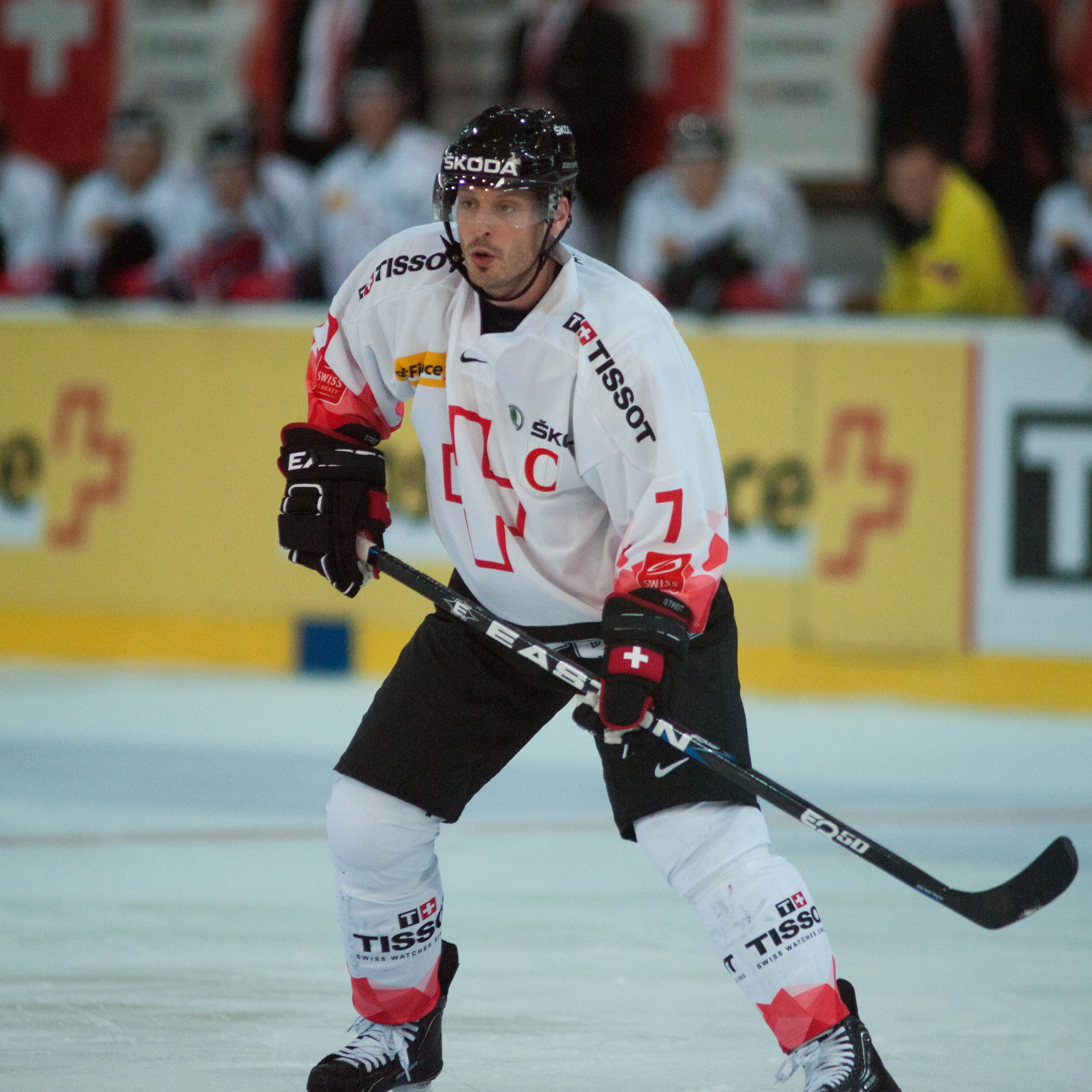
Mark Streit recorded one goal and four assists, and led his team in scoring.

Number	Position	Player	Club	GP	G	A	Pts	PIM
10	F	Andres Ambühl	HC Davos	6	2	1	3	6
57	D	Goran Bezina	Genève-Servette HC	6	0	0	0	6
5	D	Severin Blindenbacher	Zurich ZSC Lions	6	0	2	2	6
18	F	Thomas Déruns	Genève-Servette HC	5	0	0	0	0
13	D	Félicien Du Bois	Kloten Flyers	5	0	2	2	6
54	D	Philippe Furrer	SC Bern	4	0	0	0	6
51	F	Ryan Gardner	Zurich ZSC Lions	5	1	0	1	0
35	F	Sandy Jeannin	HC Fribourg-Gottéron	6	0	2	2	4
90	D	Roman Josi	SC Bern	6	0	0	0	2
67	F	Romano Lemm	HC Lugano	6	2	1	3	0
25	F	Thibaut Monnet	Zurich ZSC Lions	3	0	0	0	2
23	F	Thierry Paterlini	HC Lugano	6	0	1	1	6
28	F	Martin Plüss	SC Bern	6	3	1	4	4
88	F	Kevin Romy	HC Lugano	6	0	0	0	0
32	F	Ivo Rüthemann	SC Bern	6	0	3	3	2
39	F	Raffaele Sannitz	HC Lugano	6	0	0	0	2
31	D	Mathias Seger	Zurich ZSC Lions	6	1	1	2	4
86	F	Julien Sprunger	HC Fribourg-Gottéron	5	0	0	0	0
7	D	Mark Streit	New York Islanders	6	1	4	5	8
77	D	Yannick Weber	Montreal Canadiens	3	0	0	0	8
14	F	Roman Wick	Kloten Flyers	6	2	2	4	2
38	F	Thomas Ziegler	SC Bern	6	0	0	0	4

=== Goaltenders ===
Number	Player	Club	GP	W	L	Min	GA	GAA	SV%	SO
26	Martin Gerber	Toronto Maple Leafs	6	3	3	364	14	2.31	0.896	1
66	Ronnie Rueger	Kloten Flyers	0	–	–	–	–	–	–	–

== United States ==
- Head coach: Ron Wilson (United States)

=== Skaters ===
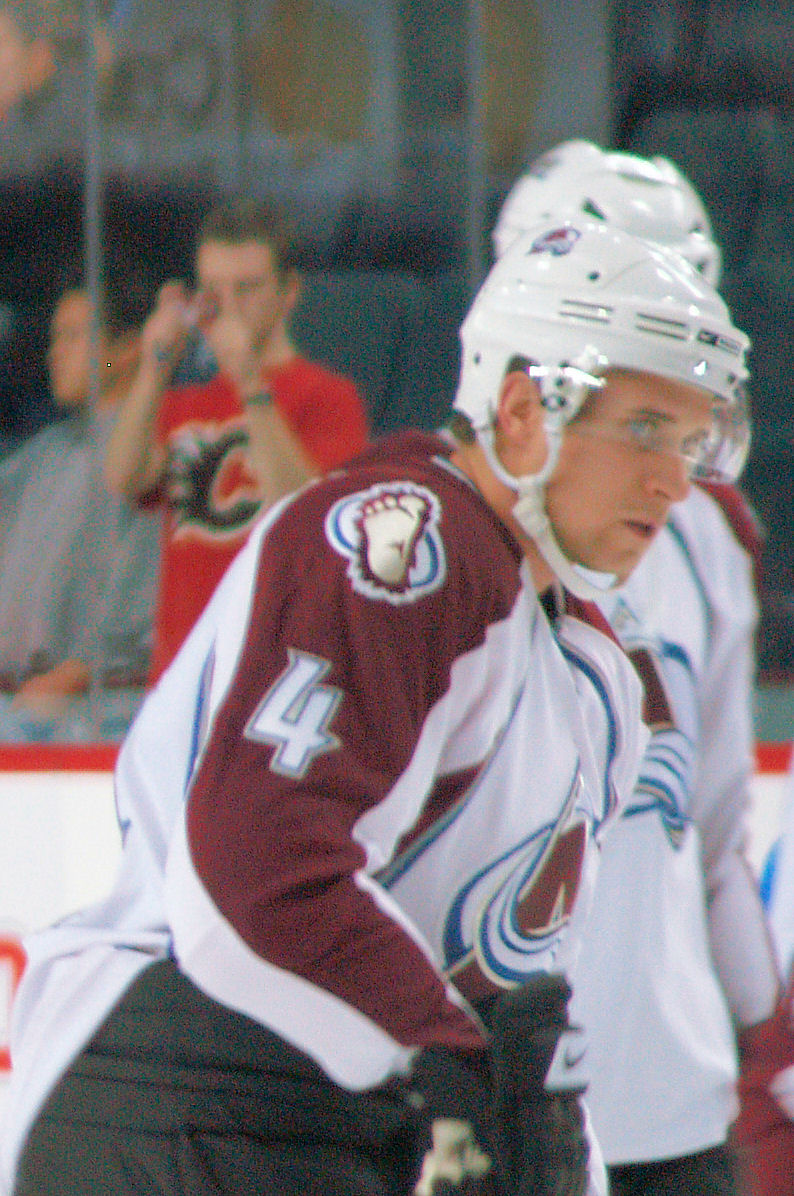
John-Michael Liles led the American team in scoring with one goal and eight assists.

Number	Position	Player	Club	GP	G	A	Pts	PIM
42	F	David Backes	St. Louis Blues	9	1	4	5	33
2	D	Keith Ballard	Florida Panthers	9	1	2	3	2
55	F	Jason Blake	Toronto Maple Leafs	9	1	3	4	4
4	D	Zach Bogosian	Atlanta Thrashers	9	0	1	1	2
23	F	Dustin Brown	Los Angeles Kings	9	3	5	8	8
17	F	Nick Foligno	Ottawa Senators	9	0	2	2	4
6	D	Ron Hainsey	Atlanta Thrashers	9	2	4	6	2
7	D	Peter Harrold	Los Angeles Kings	3	0	0	0	0
18	F	Chris Higgins	Montreal Canadiens	6	1	0	1	2
3	D	Jack Johnson	Los Angeles Kings	9	5	2	7	10
15	D	John-Michael Liles	Colorado Avalanche	9	1	8	9	2
5	D	Matt Niskanen	Dallas Stars	9	1	2	3	2
12	F	Patrick O'Sullivan	Edmonton Oilers	9	4	3	7	6
9	F	Kyle Okposo	New York Islanders	9	2	3	5	10
74	F	T. J. Oshie	St. Louis Blues	9	1	2	3	2
8	F	Joe Pavelski	San Jose Sharks	5	1	1	2	0
26	F	Ryan Shannon	Ottawa Senators	9	3	0	3	2
21	F	Drew Stafford	Buffalo Sabres	9	2	1	3	6
22	F	Lee Stempniak	Toronto Maple Leafs	9	2	0	2	6
49	F	Colin Stuart	Atlanta Thrashers	4	0	0	0	4
20	D	Ryan Suter	Nashville Predators	9	1	2	3	8
33	F	Colin Wilson	Boston University Terriers	9	0	2	2	2

=== Goaltenders ===
Number	Player	Club	GP	W	L	Min	GA	GAA	SV%	SO
30	Scott Clemmensen	New Jersey Devils	0	–	–	–	–	–	–	–
31	Robert Esche	SKA Saint Petersburg	8	3	5	480	25	3.12	0.891	0
35	Al Montoya	Phoenix Coyotes	1	1	0	60	2	2.00	0.875	0
