= K. Bhaskaran =

Indian flautist

K. Bhaskaran is an Indian Carnatic music flautist.

== Early life ==
K. Bhaskaran was born on 30 April 1961 to Lakshmi Krishnamurthi and K. Krishnamurthi, and brought up in Mylapore, in the city of Chennai. Bhaskaran started formally learning the flute from Mayavaram Saraswathi Ammal, popularly known as Mayavaram Papaa, when he was 10 years of age, after picking up the basics through family guidance. He performed his first public concert at the Madras Music Academy, on 26 September 1978. He also learnt from other vidwans formally, including S. Rajam and professor T. R. Subramanian of Delhi University. He had also undergone basic mridangam training for a brief period from Kumbakonam Rajappa Iyengar. He also has a long association with renowned flute maestro N. Ramani, and has performed concerts in his flute academy. His initial education was at P.S. High School (North), Mylapore, and he did his P.U.C. at Vivekananda College. This was followed by a B.Tech degree in chemical engineering from the Indian Institute of Technology, Madras.

== Career ==
Bhaskaran has been a regular Kutcheri performer in Chennai, and has been playing concerts since 1978 during the annual Madras Music Season every December. Besides this, he has given concerts in Mumbai, Nagpur, Kerala, Andhra Pradesh, Karnataka and several other places in India. He has also performed in USA during the 1993-1994 period. His next tour of the US was scheduled to be held in June 2011. He has been accompanied by several stalwarts such as M.S. Anantharaman, A. Kanyakumari, Umayalpuram K Sivaraman, T. V. Gopalakrishnan, Guruvayur Dorai and other renowned Carnatic musicians.

Apart from traditional Kutcheris, Bhaskaran has also played at other events, such as the ProShow at Saarang, the cultural festival of IIT Madras, in 2005. He has also given a performance organized by the Centre for Ethnomusicology Chennai and the Japanese Consulate in Oct 2009, and performed for visiting Japanese musicians (organized by the Japanese Consulate, India) in 2010. In May 2010, he performed a fundraiser concert, Akshaya 2010, accompanied by Special Thavil artiste Haridwaramangalam A. K. Palanivel. This was in aid of Udavum Karangal.

Bhaskaran, an 'A' graded radio artiste, has performed several times on national radio and television. The most notable of these include National Sangeet Sammelan programmes on All India Radio in 1997 and 2000, AIR National Programme of Music in 2004 and National Programme of Music on Doordarshan, in 2008. He also appeared on DD Podhigai TV in the fortnightly interactive lecture-demonstration show, Kalaiodu Naan.

== Innovations and research ==
Bhaskaran has done a lot of research on the use of computers in music. He created a mathematical model for the creation of Kalpanaswara through software, and developed a computer program for it. He published a technical paper on this in the Computer Society of India Communications, in 1986 and presented the music aspects of this work, in the Annual Musicians conference at the Karnataka Ganakala Parishat Bangalore, Jan 1984. He has written articles on this topic in several publications.

He has received two fellowships from the Department of Culture, Government of India, the Junior Research Fellowship awardee for outstanding artistes - 1992 – 1994, for research in arts, ‘Fabrication of fibre-glass flute and research in other areas’ and Senior Research Fellowship awardee for one year 2002-2003, from Dept of Culture, in technology and arts, Interactive Multimedia CD project on mathematics in laya and pallavis.

Recently, he has successfully used the Shankavadyam (conch), an ancient Indian instrument, as a concert instrument. He has given demonstrations about this on radio and television.

== Some released works ==
1. BILVA MUSIC – Winds of Peace (2002), Pranaam (2003), Winds of Rhythm (2008), Winds of the Spirit, Winds of the Soul (2009), Raga of sleep - Nilambari (2011)
2. AVM Audio, Flute, 1990
3. Saragam Cassettes – Flute, 1994
4. CBS Records : Flute Melody, 1988. (no longer marketed under this label, since the company CBS has been sold)
5. Sangeetha Tapes - ‘Flute’ – 2 volumes, 1991
6. 2002 release, 'Winds of Peace', was unique for having been the first album to have Carnatic and Hindustani flutes played simultaneously by the same artiste, using multi-track recording.

== Other ==
Apart from being a performer, Bhaskaran has also worked in the software industry in India for over 20 years. Recently, he has started creativity modelling programmes for employees and students under the banner 'Mindware', using extensive inputs from music. He also held a patent for an improved Murukku making machine, which he invented when he was in college.
