= Pappa =

Pappa may refer to:

== People ==
=== Given name ===
- Rav Pappa (c. 300–375), Babylonian rabbi
- Pappa Vidyaakar (born 1953), Indian humanitarian
- Pappa Umanath (1931–2010), Indian politician

=== Surname ===
- Anthony Pappa (born 1973), Australian DJ
- Elli Pappa (1920–2009), Greek writer and activist
- Gerard Pappa (1944–1980), American gangster
- Hans Pappa (1936–2024), Swiss ice hockey player
- Lena Pappa (1932–2025), Greek poet
- Maria Pappa (born 1971), Swiss-Italian politician
- Marco Pappa (born 1987), Guatemalan footballer

== Other uses ==
- Pappa (Pisidia), a town in ancient Anatolia and Roman Catholic titular see
- Pappalysin-1, encoded by the PAPPA gene

== See also ==
- Papa (disambiguation)
- Pappas, a Greek surname
