= VDGS =

VDGS can refer to:

- Visual Docking Guidance System, which helps ships to dock smoothly.
- Visual Docking Guidance System, which helps aircraft to dock at the exact position in front of the gate.
- Voodoo Glow Skulls, the Third wave Ska band.
- Vietnam's Development Goals, which is a national development initiative undertaken by the Vietnamese government.

Flight information will be sync periodically with VDGS through the IASS to share the flight allocated stand. While VDGS will share the actual parked aircraft code and the block on/off time.
