= Aircraft marshalling =

Visual signalling between ground and aircraft

Aircraft marshalling is visual signalling between ground personnel and pilots on an airport, aircraft carrier or helipad.

== Activity ==
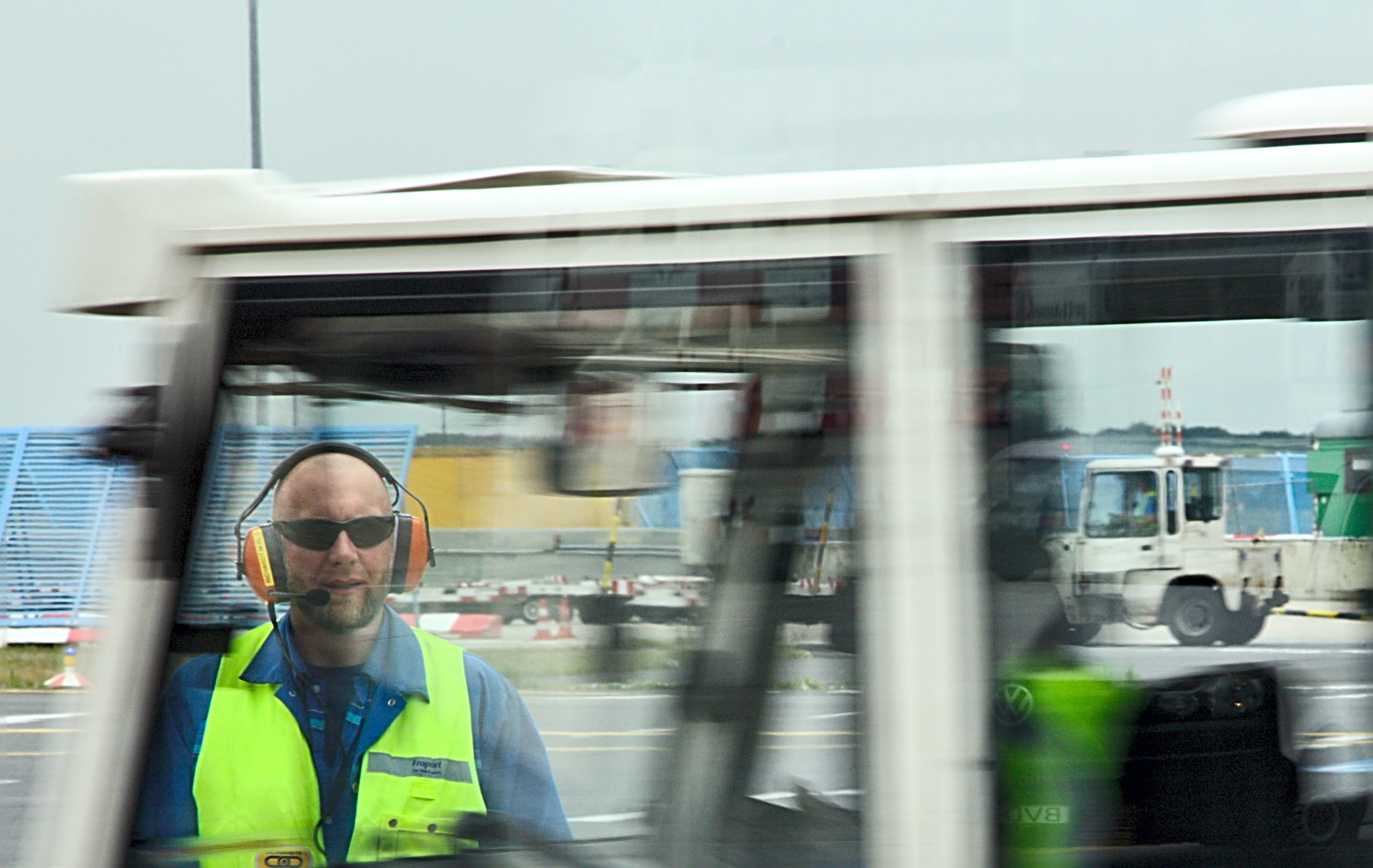
Aircraft marshaller at Frankfurt Airport

Marshalling is one-on-one visual communication and a part of aircraft ground handling. It may be as an alternative to, or additional to, radio communications between the aircraft and air traffic control. The usual equipment of a marshaller is a reflective safety vest, a helmet with acoustic earmuffs, and gloves or marshalling wands – handheld illuminated beacons.

At airports, the marshaller signals the pilot to keep turning, slow down, stop, and shut down engines, leading the aircraft to its parking stand or to the runway. Sometimes, the marshaller indicates directions to the pilot by driving a "Follow-Me" car (usually a yellow van or pick-up truck with a checkerboard pattern) prior to disembarking and resuming signalling, though this is not an industry standard.

At busier and better equipped airports, marshallers are replaced on some stands with a Visual Docking Guidance System (VDGS), of which there are many types.

A Royal Air Force Boeing C-17 being marshalled at London Heathrow Airport (2011).

On aircraft carriers or helipads, marshallers give take-off and landing clearances to aircraft and helicopters, where the very limited space and time between take-offs and landings makes radio communications a difficult alternative.

== U.S. Air Force procedures ==
Per the most recent U.S. Air Force marshalling instructions from 2012, marshallers "must wear a sleeveless garment of fluorescent international orange. It covers the shoulders and extends to the waist in the front and back. [...] During daylight hours, marshallers may use high visibility paddles. Self-illuminating wands are required at night or during restricted visibility."

Marshallers, like other ground personnel, must use protective equipment like protective goggles or "an appropriate helmet with visor, when in rotor wash areas or in front of an aircraft that is being backed using the aircraft's engines."

It also prescribes "earplugs, muff-type ear defenders, or headsets in the immediate area of aircraft that have engines, Auxiliary Power Unit, or Gas Turbine Compressor running."

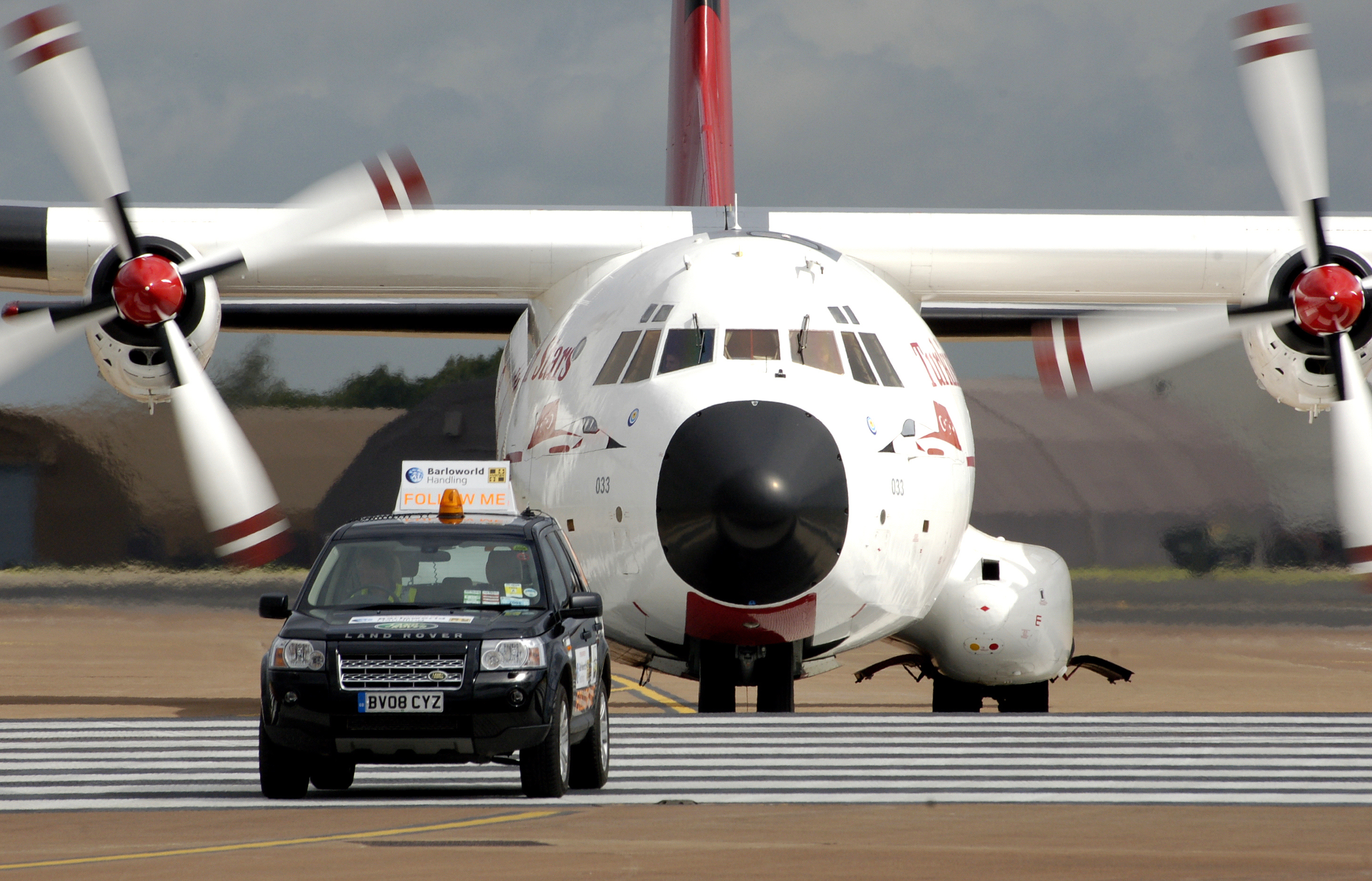
Turkish Air Force Transall C-160D behind the Follow-me car at RAF Fairford, England.

== Noise exposure ==
Excessive noise can cause hearing loss in marshallers, either imperceptibly over years or after a one-time acoustic trauma. In the United States noise limits at work are set by the Occupational Safety and Health Administration (OSHA).

== Fixed wing aircraft hand signals ==
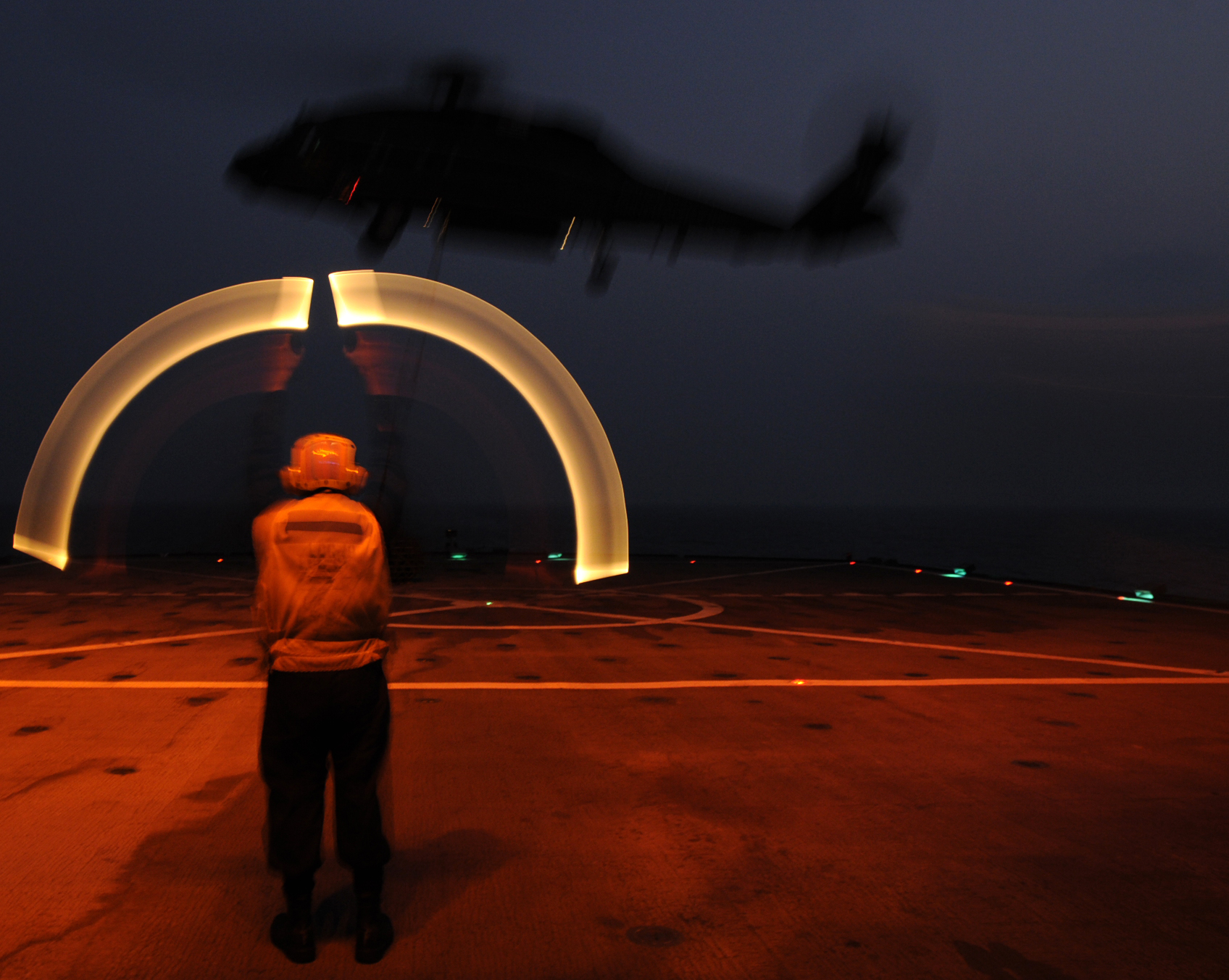
A long exposure of a United States Navy Landing Signalman Enlisted (LSE) directing a SH-60F Sea Hawk to take off using marshalling wands

Despite efforts to standaridize aspects of aviation communication, such as terminology and language, hand signals used to guide aircraft on the ground still vary between various major organizations, such as the International Civil Aviation Organization North Atlantic Treaty Organization, and the Federal Aviation Administration.

== FAA hand signals ==
During darkness or periods of poor visibility, the signals remain the same, but the signaler should use illuminated marshaling wands, or another handheld light source.

FAA hand signals

All clear (O.K.)

Flagman directs pilot

Insert chocks

Pull chocks

Start engine (Signaler points at engine to be started.)

Cut engines

Proceed straight ahead

Turn left

Turn right

Slow down

Stop

== Helicopter signals ==
Take off

Land

Move upward

Move downward

Move left

Move right

Move forward

Move rearward

Hold hover

Release sling load
