= Papa (surname) =

Papa is a surname which may refer to:

- Alfonso Papa (born 1970), Italian politician, former judge and professor
- Bob Papa (born 1964), American sportscaster
- Cyril Papa (born 1984), French ice hockey player
- Emiliano Papa (born 1982), Argentina footballer
- Gary Papa (1954 – 2009), American sportscaster and brother of Greg
- Greg Papa (born 1962), American sportscaster and brother of Gary
- Rav Papa (c. 300-375), a Babylonian Amora from the Talmud
- Salvatore Papa (born 1990), Italian footballer
- Tom Papa (born 1968), American comedian and actor
