= Thomas Roussel =

French ice hockey player

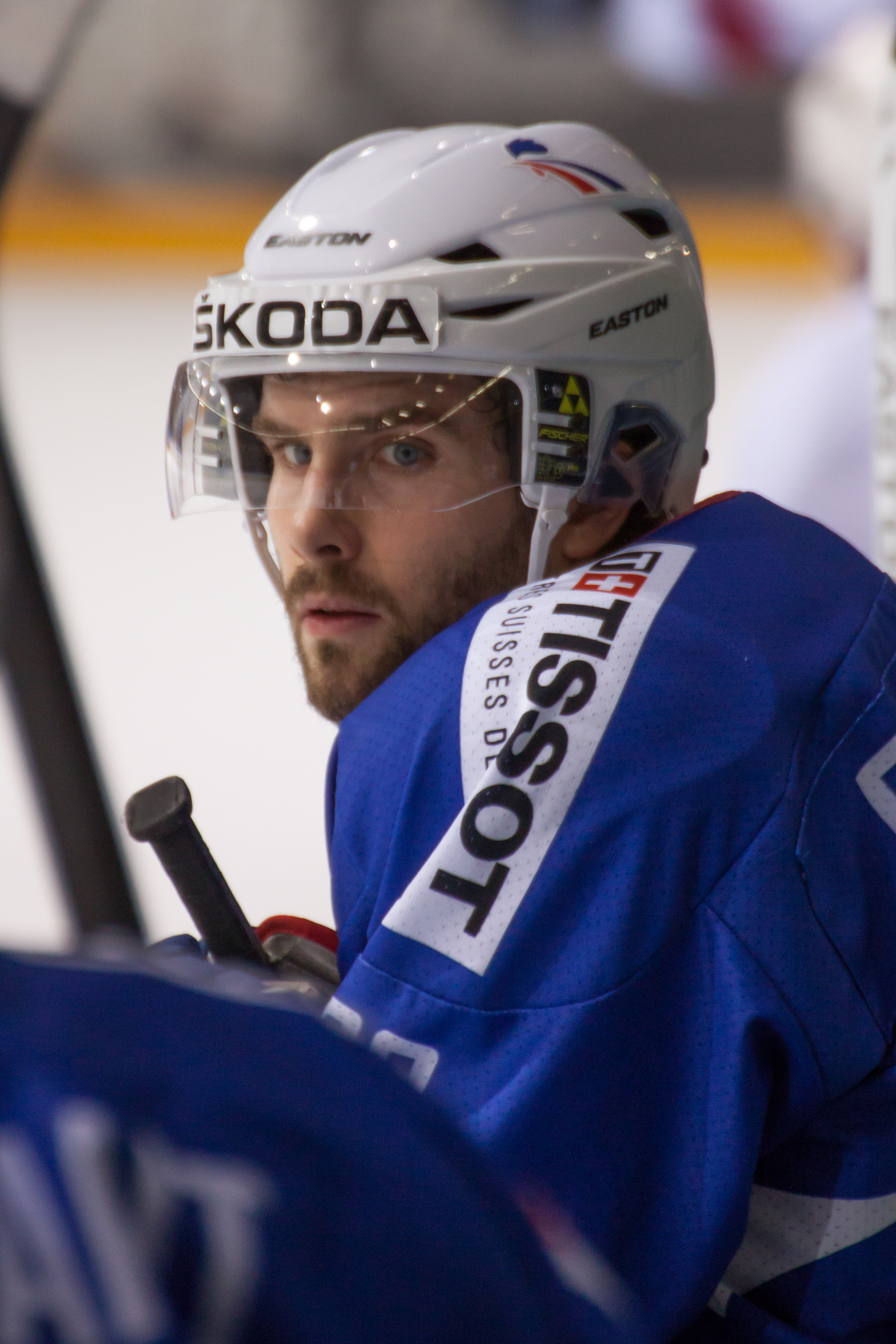
- Born: November 22, 1985 (age 40) Amiens, France
- Height: 6 ft 0 in (183 cm)
- Weight: 187 lb (85 kg; 13 st 5 lb)
- Position: Defence
- Played for: Gothiques d'Amiens; Ducs de Dijon; LHC Les Lions
- National team: France
- Playing career: 2015–2020

Thomas Roussel (born November 22, 1985, in Amiens) is a French former professional ice hockey defenceman who played at the 2009 IIHF World Championship as a member of the France National men's ice hockey team.

== Career ==
Roussel was added to the roster of The Arizona Sundogs of the Central Hockey League for the 2009-10 season. Roussel had previously played in France for the last season and had skated in France for his entire playing career before joining the Sundogs.

The defenceman had appeared in 140 regular season games with Amiens, recording eight goals, 23 assists and 221 penalty minutes (PIM). Roussel set career highs in goals (3), assists (11) and penalty minutes (99) last season. In 33 combined tournament and playoff contests, he collected eight points (3g/5a) and 52 PIM.

Roussel was 23 years old when he started for the Sundogs and is 6-foot and weighed 187-pounds. Roussel who is a native of France also appeared in six games with Team France during the 2009 International Ice Hockey Federation (IIHF) World Championships in Switzerland. He had one assist and two PIM in six games.

== See also ==
- Arizona Sundogs
- France men's national ice hockey team
- 2009 IIHF World Championship rosters
