= Udavum Karangal =

- Founded: 1983
- Founder: Pappa Vidyaakar
- Purpose: Children, senior citizens, community care, mentally challenged, rehabilitation
- Location: Chennai, India
- Region served: Tamil Nadu
- Members: Approx. 120
- Website: www.myhelpinghands.org

Udavum Karangal is a philanthropic organisation based out of Chennai, India. This organisation does service taking care of orphans and other needy people helping them in all forms of development. The founder of this organisation is Mr. Vidyaakar.

Udavum Karangal, which in Tamil means "Helping Hands", is a social service organisation, established in 1983, with an objective of serving people in distress who are orphans & destitutes.

The organisation's beginnings trace back to 1983, when Vidyaakar began his work in a voluntary counselling and guidance centre, as a professional social worker, in the slums of NSK Nagar, Chennai. A puny, dehydrated, wailing baby boy was brought by a rickshaw puller, who had found it, abandoned in a cinema hall, after a night show. Since then there has been no looking back, neither for Vidyaakar nor for Udavum Karangal.

Udavum Karangal extends help and succour and a new lease of life to nearly 2,000 unfortunate persons from newborn babies, abandoned or orphaned to old dying destitutes. The centre provides individualized services, treatment, care, rehabilitation and education to those in distress.

The activities Udavum Karangal is involved in are:

Residential Care, Short Stay, Health Care, Educational Facilities, Rehabilitation, Ambulance & Mortuary Services, Disaster Management (to the victims of the society and nature), Information, Guidance & Counselling.
