= Pappa Vidyaakar =

Indian humanitarian worker (born 1953)

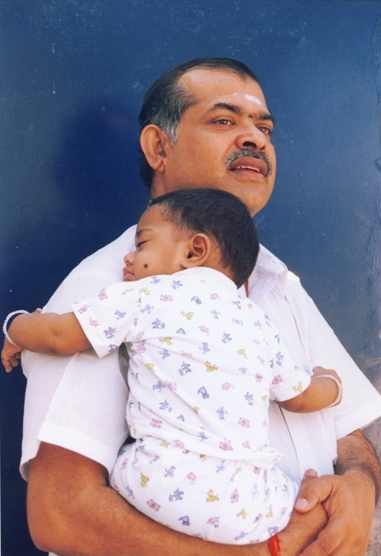
- Pappa Vidyaakar with one of his rescued children
- Born: Steven Vidyaakar; April 16, 1953 (age 72); Tamil Nadu
- Occupation: Humanitarian worker
- Known for: Founder of Udavum Karangal

"Pappa" Vidyaakar (born Steven Vidyaakar, Mangalore, 16 April 1953) is an Indian humanitarian worker. He is mostly known to be the founder of Udavum Karangal, a NGO based in Chennai, India

== Early life and the meeting with Ramakrishnan ==
Pappa Vidyaakar was born in Mangalore but grew up in Kollegal in the state of Karnataka. There when he was aged 13, witnessed an accident and rescued a man from Chennai named Ramakrishnan.
The two kept in touch and few years later Pappa went to visit him in Chennai. Here he stayed under the shelter of the man, who raised in him his natural inclination towards seeking the good of others.
Pappa trained in Psychiatric social work and psychological counseling at the Madras School of Social Work, and after joined Chennai's leading organizations delivering care for leprosy and mental health. He also had the privilege of serving with Mother Teresa. Before he turned 30 he started working in a voluntary counseling and guidance center in the area of NSK Nagar.

== The foundation of Udavum Karangal ==
At the beginning of the 1980s Vidyaakar moved to NSK Nagar, a poor area in Chennai, to start a volunteering collaboration with a local charity. By living among the people he was trying to help he soon raised popularity in the area. Many people started to address him for help and assistance.
In 1983 a rickshaw puller came to him with an abandoned child found in a cinema hall after a show. Vidyaakar tried in vain to find a solution for him, but nobody was able to help; determined to take care of the poor victim, he fostered him. Following this example, he used his own house to shelter more children and few days later registered Udavum Karangal (Helping Hands, in Tamil language).
Soon many people started spontaneously to support his project, allowing him to hire other social workers and expand the area of interest of the charity to elders, mentally challenged and education.
In the 1990s a new headquarters was built in the outskirts town of Thiruverkadu and in 1997 a public, free of charge school by Udavum Karangal started operating in the same area. Recently a new branch has started in Coimbatore and Udavum Karangal is now a NGO fostering over 2,000 between students, elders and mentally challenged and giving work to over 120 people.
Thanks to the life-changing impact they had in the area and the relief work produced following the 2004 tsunami event which struck Chennai, both Pappa Vidyaakar and Udavum Karangal received in the last decades several international and Indian awards

== Awards and accolades ==
1. International award for most outstanding voluntary organisation in India - Matsushita, Japan, 1992
2. Maschio Humanitarian Award - Mumbai, 1996
3. Certificate Of Honour - The Madras School of Social Works, 1996
4. Award for best institution - Government of Tamil Nadu, 2002
5. Recognition for Outstanding Services - City of Philadelphia, 2003
6. Congratulatory letter - Mayor of Seattle, 2003
7. Award for best social worker - Government of Tamil Nadu, 2004
8. Citation for services provided for tsunami victimes - Denver Sister Cities, 2005
9. Rotary International Award - Chennai, 2007
10. Indira Gandhi Award - New Delhi, 2008
11. Kannada Rajotsava Award - Karnataka, 2012
12. Rising personality of the century - Penguin Publications
13. Award of excellence - Loud Thinking Forum
14. Citation Honouring Udavum Karangal - Governor of Pennsylvania
