= Papa, Samoa =

Village in Samoa

Coordinates: 13°45′27.33″S 172°17′9.34″W

Papa is a village on the island of Savai'i in Samoa. It is situated on the south coast of the island in the district of Palauli and the electoral district of Palauli 2. The population is 357.

Papa name originated from Faapapateaina, an event that old village were hunting sea eels. There were many eels on coral reefs, the village men immediately hunted for food, when they started to come back to land 'anamoēa' with eels, the giant 'A-Pagoa' ate the fishermen. Some men were back to sea and then the giant eel ate them. Few men were managed to escape to land while most of them were eaten by 'Apusi and A-Pagoa'.

The villagers rushed to rescue and collect the dead bodies. The reactions originated the name 'Faapapateaina' and the name became short these days 'Papa'.

The neighborhood village also established by the name 'Satufia' because, the rescuers collected 'tufi' their family members. At the same time, the name 'Satufia' came after 'tufi' -collect. People who considered themselves as a group of Satufi.

Another name emerged after the deadly event and the beach of that particular area started to name 'Faga [beach] liu [turn] a'iga [happen so quick- FAGALIUA'IGA.

Two separate village established 'Papa and Satufia' perhaps, both were people of Ologa in Satupa'itea, but eventually they were densely populated and one (Papa) is settled at Tufu (old name of Palauli Le Falefa) and the other (Satufia) remains as part of Satupa'itea.

People of Papa originated from both Satupa'itea and Palauli, their 'gafa' genealogies, their ancestors managed to become 'tufuga-fau-fale'. Tauatamaniuulaaita was the first Samoan Builder of 'Maota poutu-tasi' and 'afolau'. His legacy lives nowadays as he is 'Agaiotupu' faced with building Kings' Maota' house.

Fofoaivaoese arrived in Papa to be the wife of Tauatamaniuulaaita born Taufau, Sina and Asomualemalama around 14th century. Asomualemalama had an appointment to be a master builder after his father (Tauatamaniuulaaita), Taufau became the third (3) Queen of Samoa and Sina succeeded the Samoa Royal Family bloodine to her son 'Faumuina'.
