= Omar Ennafatti =

Canadian-born Hungarian ice hockey player

- Born: 26 April 1980 (age 44); Toronto, Ontario, Canada
- Height: 6 ft 1 in (185 cm)
- Weight: 218 lb (99 kg; 15 st 8 lb)
- Position: Defence
- Shoots: Right
- ACH team Former teams: Dundas Real McCoys; Alba Volán Székesfehérvár; Manchester Phoenix; Diables Noirs de Tours; Ferencvárosi TC; Budapest Stars
- National team: Hungary
- Playing career: 1997–present

Omar Ennaffati (born 26 April 1980) is a Canadian-born Hungarian professional ice hockey player, currently playing for the Dundas Real McCoys in Allan Cup Hockey.

== Playing career ==
Ennaffati was born in Toronto, Ontario. He began his career playing for the North Bay Centennials, a junior team in the Ontario Hockey League (OHL). He spent two years as a Centennials player and made more than 100 appearances before moving on to the Mississauga Ice Dogs, again of the OHL being named the team's defenceman of the year. During the same season, Ennaffati played in his first senior games, for the now-defunct Greenville Grrrowl, then of the ECHL.

Ennaffati would again play for the Ice Dogs the following year, before moving to senior level as a defenceman for the New Orleans Brass, another ECHL team. He made just two appearances in his first regular season in New Orleans, but featured in the playoffs as a regular. His playoff appearances impressed, and helped him to force his way into the first team for the 2000/01 season, playing on more than 30 occasions and weighing in with his fair share of points, totalling 11 during that time.

Ennaffati would begin his University career the year after, lining up for St. Francis Xavier University for three and a half seasons, where he was part of a National Championship winning team in 2004 and named First Team All-Canadian in 2005. Ennaffati split the 2004/05 season between his time at the university and three ECHL appearances for the Idaho Steelheads. For the following season, Ennaffati would play for Alba Volan Szekesfehervar at both Hungarian and International League standard. During this time, Ennaffati took Hungarian nationality, despite actually being born in Canada.

After two seasons in Hungary, Ennaffati moved to sign for the Manchester Phoenix of the EIHL alongside fellow ex-Greenville players Scott Fankhouser and Brian Passmore. Ennaffati agreed to continue his European hockey career with the French Diables Noirs de Tours in the summer of 2008.

== International ==
He was named as part of the Hungarian national team for the 2008 World Championships and helped his country gain promotion to Pool A. He competed with Hungary at the 2009 IIHF World Championships, playing against his birth country Canada.
