= Cyril Papa =

French ice hockey left winger

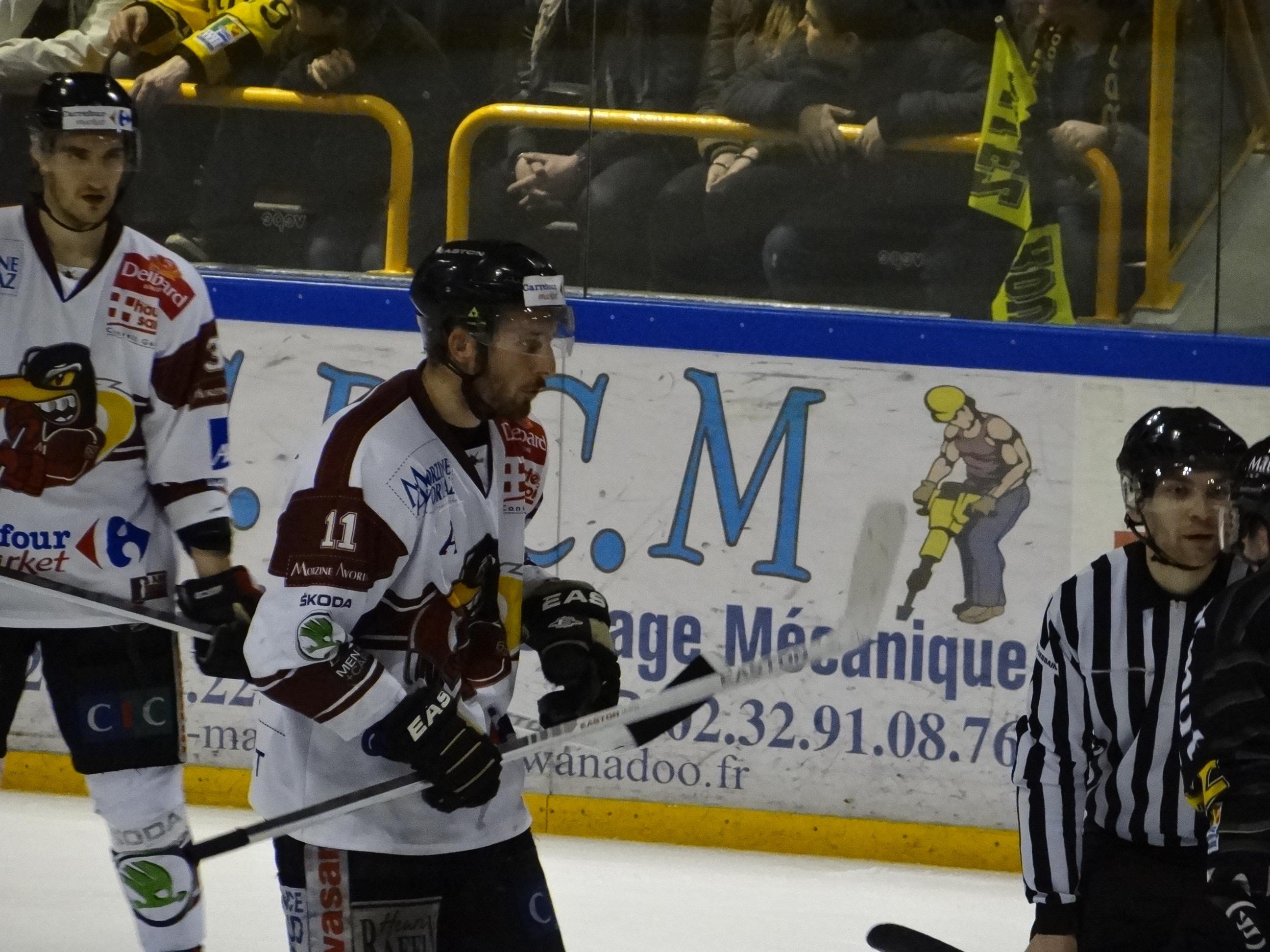
- Photograph of the player in the first match of the 2012-2013 Lige Magnus quarter-finals
- Born: 14 February 1984 (age 42) La Tronche, France
- Height: 6 ft 0 in (183 cm)
- Weight: 170 lb (77 kg; 12 st 2 lb)
- Position: Left wing
- Shoots: Left
- FFHG Division 2 team Former teams: Chevaliers du Lac d'Annecy; Brûleurs de Loups; Ours de Villard-de-Lans; HC Morzine-Avoriaz
- National team: France
- Playing career: 2002–present

Cyril Papa (born 14 February 1984) is a French professional ice hockey winger who is currently a player-coach for Chevaliers du Lac d'Annecy of the FFHG Division 2.

Papa previously played for Brûleurs de Loups, Ours de Villard-de-Lans and HC Morzine-Avoriaz before joining Annecy in 2016. He also played in the 2009 IIHF World Championship for France.
