= Stand guidance system =

System to assist aircraft to park at airport gates

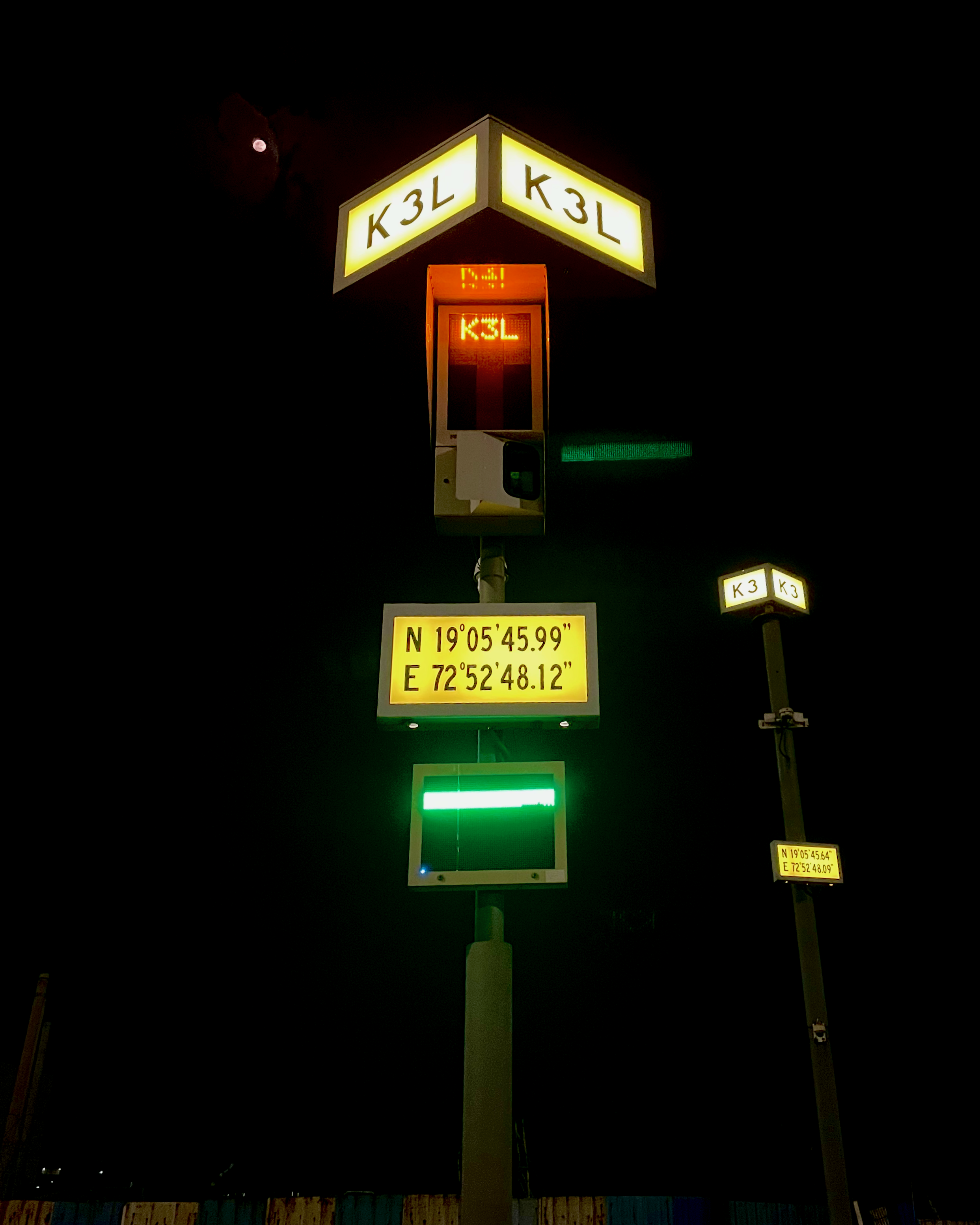
An ADB Safegate A-VDGS installed on Stand K3L at Mumbai Airport.

A stand guidance system is a system which gives information to a pilot attempting to park an aircraft at an airport stand, usually via visual methods, leading to the term Visual Docking Guidance System (VDGS) and also A-VDGS (the A standing for advanced) This allows them to remain clear of obstructions and ensures that jetways can reach the aircraft.

== AGNIS VDGS ==
Azimuth Guidance for Nose-In Stand is one of the most popular forms of stand guidance. It consists of two coloured lights mounted side by side. If the pilot is on the stand centreline they will see two green lights. If they are off centreline, one of the lights will appear red and the pilot then steers towards the green one. AGNIS alone provides only azimuth guidance, it does not inform pilots when they should stop. It is relatively imprecise but cheap to implement and reliable.

=== PAPA ===
AGNIS is shown on the left, in this example the aircraft is right of the centreline. On the right is a prototypical PAPA, which features no moving parts or electronics. The two systems are not shown to scale, an AGNIS lightbox is many times smaller than a PAPA box

The Parallax Aircraft Parking Aid is frequently combined with an AGNIS system, informing flight crews when to stop. The device features no electronics or moving parts; it consists simply of a large grey box (usually with one or more sides missing) with a large rectangular slot cut into the front.

Inside the box, towards the rear, is a white stick or fluorescent tube, which appears to move from one side of the slot to the other as the viewer moves closer, although it is in fact fixed and the effect is merely due to perspective (see parallax). Above and/or below this slot will be markings in white or yellow, indicating where different types of plane should stop.

As this system relies on the position of the viewer, it will not give accurate distance information to aircraft which have deviated significantly from the stand centreline.

=== Stop light ===
This is a simple two phase traffic light with red and green lights, mounted to the side of the AGNIS lights. Typically these are round and mounted vertically, in order to avoid confusion to AGNIS lights which are also red and green but mounted side by side and usually square.

=== Mirror ===
Used in combination with AGNIS at stands which can only accept smaller airliners, it features one or two mirrors, allowing the flightcrew to see ground markings in relation to their nose wheel, when it is within the area they need to stop. Typically two mirrors are used, angled differently to suit the various heights of cockpits from the ground.

== A-VDGS ==
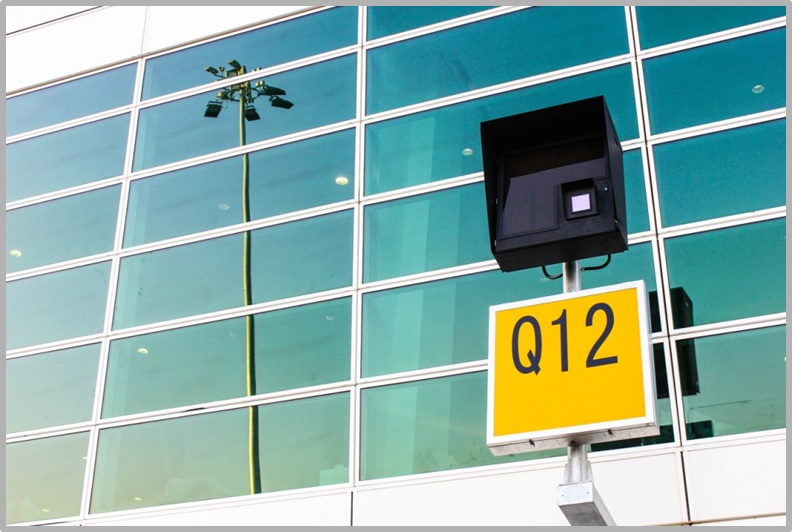
RLG GIS 206-2 at KLIA2, Malaysia

Advanced Visual Docking Guidance Systems feature electronic displays which perform the functions of an AGNIS/PAPA installation, although with much greater accuracy. They may also provide collision avoidance from static objects. An infrared high definition camera is scanning the entire area for possible objects, affecting the safety of the aircraft. The usual distance is from 8–50 meters (26–164 ft). The A-VGDS, is equipped with a low visibility function allowing aircraft to park in extremely poor visibility conditions.

A-VDGS systems usually have emergency stop buttons located both on the stand and in the jetway/gate area, which causes the stop indication to appear immediately.

=== RLG ===
The RLG GIS-206 uses lasers to determine the position of the aircraft, subsequently displaying the distance the aircraft must go as well as showing an Azimuth guidance.

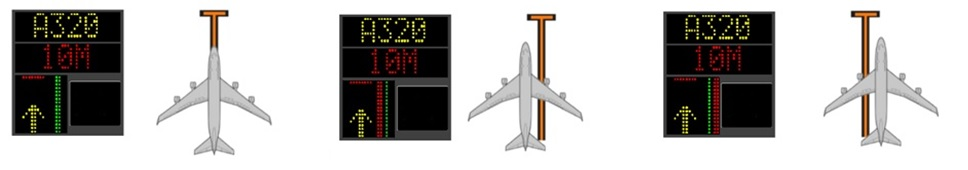

=== FMT ===
The Aircraft Positioning and Information System (APIS++) is manufactured by FMT. The left side of the unit displays Azimuth guidance; providing the pilot with vital information when as far as 200 meters (660 ft) from the stand and while the aircraft is still perpendicular to the stand centreline. The right side of the unit gives the pilot precise information concerning closing rate as well as instructions when to stop.

The azimuth guidance, based on the Moiré Pattern works independently of the laser that calculates distance to stop and is unaffected by weather conditions.

The laser, which has a pulse frequency of 9.6 kHz and a resolution of 1 centimetre (0.39 in), ensures that the pilot can stop in the exact stopping position. The system can be connected with the passenger boarding bridge, apron management system or other airport systems via TCP/IP or Ethernet connections. It can also be equipped with a back-up traffic light system.

	Aircraft location: 16 meters from stop position, to the right of centreline	Aircraft location: Nose landing gear positioned on centreline at stop position
Aircraft location: 20 meters from stop position, to the left of centreline	Aircraft location: 16 meters from stop position, to the right of centreline	Aircraft location: Nose landing gear positioned on centreline at stop position

=== ADB Safegate ===
Far away, no guidance	On centreline	Left of centreline	Right of centreline	Near stop line	Prepare to stop	Stop now	Overshot stop point

The green lights on the left and right of the display will begin to appear, from bottom to top, as the aircraft gets closer to the stop line. The green centreline on the display moves smoothly left and right to accurately indicate how away from the centreline an aircraft is.

An example of a Safedock S model display. The aircraft parking is a B757 which is left of the centreline. The vertical yellow bar in the centre disappears, from bottom to top, as the aircraft approaches the stopping point.

=== Safedock ===
Safedock by ADB Safegate, allows aircraft to park up to an accuracy of 10 centimetres (3.9 in) using invisible infrared lasers to attain the aircraft's position and type for easier docking. It comes in a variety of models; the X, the T1, the T2 and the T3. Red and yellow arrows indicate in which direction the pilot needs to manoeuvre to be on the centreline. Each model has an S variant (e.g. T1S), which also indicates the position of the aircraft relative to the centreline. In either variant, a central yellow column disappears from bottom to top as the aircraft approaches the stop point. The latest models developed by ADB Safegate are called Safedock X and Flex which provides advanced functionality including detection through radar system.

== Marshaller ==
Marshallers use a variety of arm signals to indicate where aircraft are in relation to both the stop line and the centreline. Signals used by marshallers can vary between countries and services (for example, some may be specific to aircraft carriers).
