= 2009 IIHF World Championship =

2009 edition of the IIHF World Championship

Tournament details
- Host country: Switzerland
- Venues: 2 (in 2 host cities)
- Dates: 24 April – 10 May
- Opened by: Hans-Rudolf Merz
- Teams: 16

Final positions
- Champions: Russia (3rd title)
- Runners-up: Canada
- Third place: Sweden
- Fourth place: United States

Tournament statistics
- Games played: 56
- Goals scored: 323 (5.77 per game)
- Attendance: 379,044 (6,769 per game)
- Scoring leader: (Canada) Martin St. Louis (15 points)

Awards
- MVP: (Russia) Ilya Kovalchuk

The 2009 IIHF World Championship took place from 24 April to 10 May 2009 in Switzerland. The games were played in the PostFinance Arena in Bern and Schluefweg in Kloten.

The PostFinance Arena in Bern was renovated and accommodates an attendance of 17,000. The Eishalle Schluefweg in Kloten was expanded for the 2008–09 season to a capacity of 9,000 people. Switzerland gained the right to host the World Championship for the 10th time.
"Live for the Action" by Swiss hard rock veterans Krokus was named the official anthem of the tournament.

Russia won the championship, winning all its matches and defeating Canada in the final 2–1. Ilya Kovalchuk was named the best forward and the most valuable player of the tournament. Over 17 million people watched the televised final around the world.

== Participating teams ==
Group A

- Belarus (roster)
- Canada (roster)
- Hungary (roster)
- Slovakia (roster)

Group B

- France (roster)
- Germany (roster)
- Russia (roster)
- Switzerland (roster)

Group C

- Austria (roster)
- Latvia (roster)
- Sweden (roster)
- United States (roster)

Group D

- Czech Republic (roster)
- Denmark (roster)
- Finland (roster)
- Norway (roster)

== Venues ==
PostFinance Arena Capacity: 12,000	2009 IIHF World Championship is located in Switzerland	Arena Zürich-Kloten Capacity: 7,561
Switzerland – Bern	2009 IIHF World Championship is located in Switzerland	Switzerland – Zürich

== Preliminary round ==
Sixteen participating teams were placed in the following four groups. After playing a round-robin, the top three teams in each group advanced to the qualifying round. The last team in each group competed in the relegation round.

Groups A and D were played in Kloten, groups B and C in Bern.

=== Group A ===
Pos	Team	Pld	W	OTW	OTL	L	GF	GA	GD	Pts	Qualification
1	Canada	3	3	0	0	0	22	4	+18	9	Qualifying round
2	Belarus	3	1	1	0	1	6	8	−2	5	Qualifying round
3	Slovakia	3	1	0	1	1	8	12	−4	4	Qualifying round
4	Hungary	3	0	0	0	3	4	16	−12	0	Relegation round

Source: IIHF

All times are local (UTC+2).

24 April; 16:15	Belarus	1–6 (0–2, 0–0, 1–4)	Canada	Schluefweg, Kloten; Attendance: 5,232

Game reference
	Referees: (Finland) Sami Partanen (Finland) Jyri Rönn
M. Grabovski 52:44 / Goals / 01:05 S. Stamkos; 14:29 (PP1) S. Stamkos; 44:27 J. Spezza; 46:01 M. Fisher; 50:44 D. Heatley; 54:05 D. Heatley	Referees: (Finland) Sami Partanen (Finland) Jyri Rönn

24 April; 20:15	Slovakia	4–3 (1–0, 2–1, 1–2)	Hungary	Schluefweg, Kloten; Attendance: 4,773

Game reference

Referees:
(Switzerland) Brent Reiber
(Czech Republic) Vladimír Šindler

S. Ružička (D. Granak, R. Vydareny) – 01:46	1–0
	1–1	22:01 – R. Holéczy (A. Benk, B. Kangyal)
L. Bartečko (M. Hossa) – 38:13	2–1
M. Hossa 39:04	3–1
	3–2	42:52 – I. Peterdi
	3–3	54:04 (PP1) T. Sille
L. Bartečko 59:47	4–3

26 April; 16:15	Slovakia	1–2 GWS (0–0, 0–1, 1–0) (OT: 0–0) (SO: 1–2)	Belarus	Schluefweg, Kloten; Attendance: 5,256

Game reference
	Referees: (Russia) Vyacheslav Bulanov (Russia) Rafail Kadyrov
M. Hossa 57:06 / Goals / 33:17 A. Stas; 65:00 (GWG) O. Antonenko	Referees: (Russia) Vyacheslav Bulanov (Russia) Rafail Kadyrov

26 April; 20:15	Canada	9–0 (4–0, 2–0, 3–0)	Hungary	Schluefweg, Kloten; Attendance: 5,506

Game reference
	Referees: (United States) Rick Looker (Germany) Daniel Piechaczek
M. St. Louis 05:18; S. Weber (PP1) 09:40; D. Roy 12:35; J. Neal 12:48; M. St. Louis 27:35; S. Weber (PP1) 29:03; M. Fisher (PP1) 41:06; M. St. Louis 44:51; J. Spezza 50:55 / Goals	Referees: (United States) Rick Looker (Germany) Daniel Piechaczek

28 April; 16:15	Hungary	1–3 (0–1, 1–0, 0–2)	Belarus	Schluefweg, Kloten; Attendance: 4,710

Game reference
	Referees: (Norway) Ole Hansen (Switzerland) Danny Kurmann
I. Pererdi 25:14 / Goals / 03:18 (PP1) A. Kalyuzhny; 54:25 A. Ugarov; 59:10 (EN) M. Grabovski	Referees: (Norway) Ole Hansen (Switzerland) Danny Kurmann

28 April; 20:15	Canada	7–3 (3–0, 3–1, 1–2)	Slovakia	Schluefweg, Kloten; Attendance: 6,300

Game reference
	Referees: (United States) Thomas Sterns (Sweden) Marcus Vinnerborg
D. Roy (PP1) 04:50; S. Doan (PP2) 06:54; J. Spezza (PP1) 16:51; I. White 29:39; S. Weber (PP2) 33:41; S. Stamkos (PP1) 35:04; J. Spezza 42:04 / Goals / 26:05 T. Surový; 55:40 (PP1) M. Hossa; 58:48 (PP1) D. Graňák	Referees: (United States) Thomas Sterns (Sweden) Marcus Vinnerborg

=== Group B ===
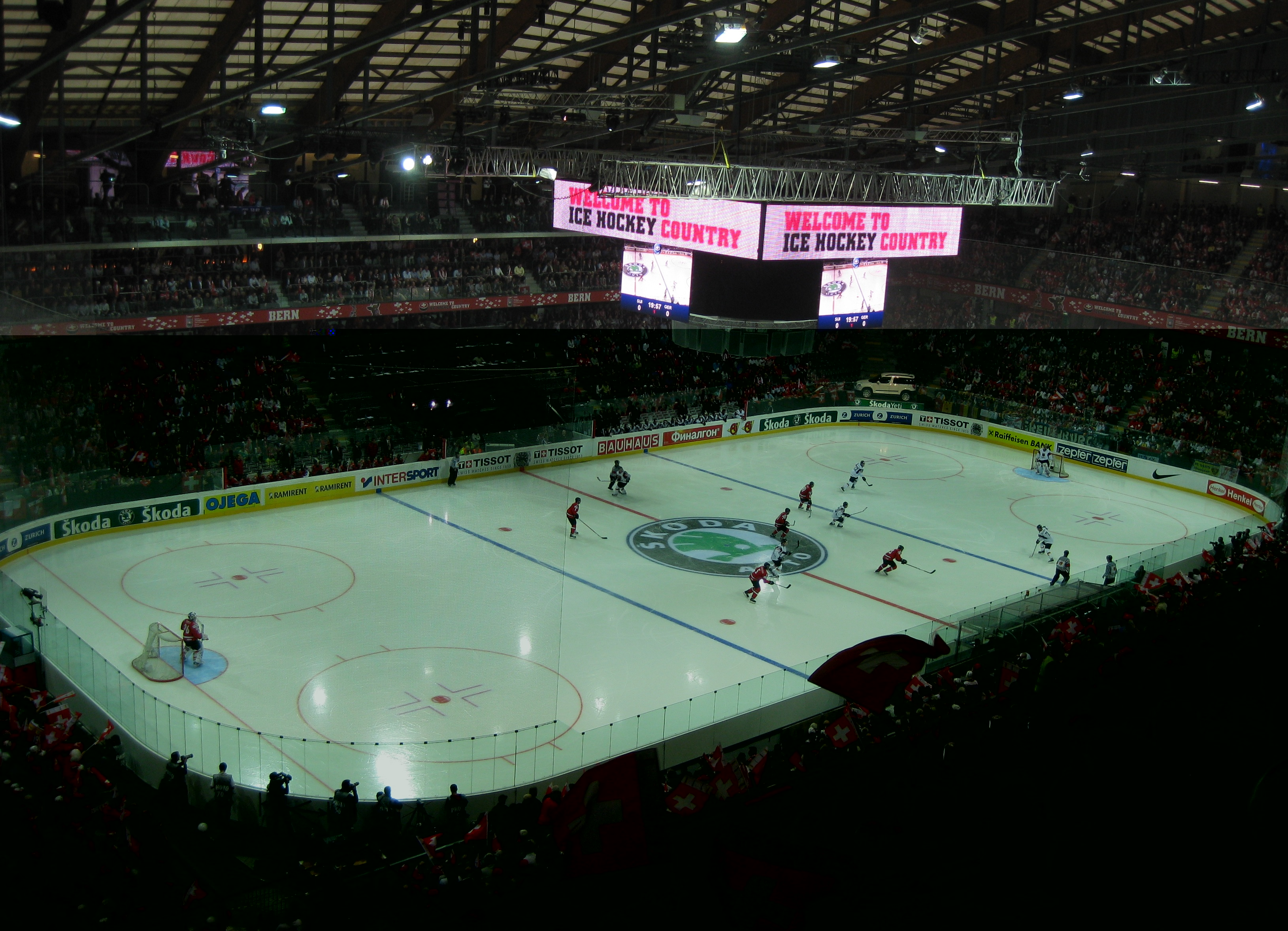
Switzerland - Germany

Pos	Team	Pld	W	OTW	OTL	L	GF	GA	GD	Pts	Qualification
1	Russia	3	3	0	0	0	16	4	+12	9	Qualifying round
2	Switzerland	3	1	1	0	1	6	6	0	5	Qualifying round
3	France	3	1	0	0	2	4	9	−5	3	Qualifying round
4	Germany	3	0	0	1	2	3	10	−7	1	Relegation round

Source: IIHF

All times are local (UTC+2).

24 April; 16:15	Germany	0–5 (0–3, 0–0, 0–2)	Russia	PostFinance Arena, Bern; Attendance: 10,570

Game reference
	Referees: (Sweden) Sören Persson (Sweden) Marcus Vinnerborg
Goals / 08:14 O. Saprykin; 09:37 I. Kovalchuk; 15:25 S. Zinovjev; 42:53 A. Kuryanov; 51:52 D. Zaripov	Referees: (Sweden) Sören Persson (Sweden) Marcus Vinnerborg

24 April; 20:15	Switzerland	1–0 (1–0, 0–0, 0–0)	France	PostFinance Arena, Bern; Attendance: 10,570

Game reference
	Referees: (United States) Rick Looker (United States) Thomas Sterns
M. Plüss (PP1) 11:33 / Goals	Referees: (United States) Rick Looker (United States) Thomas Sterns

26 April; 16:15	Switzerland	3–2 OT (1–1, 1–1, 0–0) (OT: 1–0)	Germany	PostFinance Arena, Bern; Attendance: 11,423

Game reference
	Referees: (Finland) Sami Partanen (Finland) Jyri Rönn
R. Wick 08:36; M. Seger 23:25; M. Streit (PP1) 61:18 / Goals / 06:26 (PP1) C. Ullmann; 33:02 (SH1) C. Schubert	Referees: (Finland) Sami Partanen (Finland) Jyri Rönn

26 April; 20:15	Russia	7–2 (5–1, 1–1, 1–0)	France	PostFinance Arena, Bern; Attendance: 10,505

Game reference
	Referees: (Norway) Ole Hansen (Slovakia) Peter Ország
A. Radulov 01:23; D. Zaripov (PP1) 07:06; A. Radulov 07:20; A. Perezhogin 08:01; A. Tereshchenko (PP1) 15:00; A. Tereshchenko (PP1) 27:23; I. Kovalchuk 49:20 / Goals / 10:25 K. Hecquefeuille; 39:31 L. Tardif	Referees: (Norway) Ole Hansen (Slovakia) Peter Ország

28 April; 16:15	Russia	4–2 (1–2, 1–0, 2–0)	Switzerland	PostFinance Arena, Bern; Attendance: 11,479

Game reference
	Referees: (Czech Republic) Vladimir Sindler (Canada) Derek Zalaski
V. Atyushov 02:19; I. Kovalchuk 29:08; A. Morozov 48:28; A. Perezhogin (EN) 59:45 / Goals / 09:46 (PP1) R. Gardner; 17:17 (PP1) M. Plüss	Referees: (Czech Republic) Vladimir Sindler (Canada) Derek Zalaski

28 April; 20:15	France	2–1 (2–1, 0–0, 0–0)	Germany	PostFinance Arena, Bern; Attendance: 9,956

Game reference
	Referees: (Slovakia) Vladimír Baluška (Switzerland) Brent Reiber
A. Lussier 03:50; L. Tardif 16:48 / Goals / 04:22 (PP1) J. Hecht	Referees: (Slovakia) Vladimír Baluška (Switzerland) Brent Reiber

=== Group C ===
Pos	Team	Pld	W	OTW	OTL	L	GF	GA	GD	Pts	Qualification
1	United States	3	2	0	1	0	15	9	+6	7	Qualifying round
2	Sweden	3	1	1	1	0	15	9	+6	6	Qualifying round
3	Latvia	3	1	1	0	1	7	6	+1	5	Qualifying round
4	Austria	3	0	0	0	3	2	15	−13	0	Relegation round

Source: IIHF

All times are local (UTC+2).

25 April; 16:15	United States	4–2 (1–1, 2–1, 1–0)	Latvia	PostFinance Arena, Bern; Attendance: 7,840

Game reference
	Referees: (Norway) Ole Hansen (Switzerland) Danny Kurmann
J. Johnson 11:15; D. Stafford 31:13; J. Johnson 35:31; P. O'Sullivan 46:03 / Goals / 04:40 (PP1) H. Vasiļjevs; 26:39 M. Karsums	Referees: (Norway) Ole Hansen (Switzerland) Danny Kurmann

25 April; 20:15	Sweden	7–1 (3–0, 0–1, 4–0)	Austria	PostFinance Arena, Bern; Attendance: 6,175

Game reference
	Referees: (Russia) Vyacheslav Bulanov (Russia) Rafail Kadyrov
K. Jönsson 1:37; M. Johansson 11:49; M. Nilson 12:46; M. Weinhandl 41:22; M. Weinhandl 47:00; J. Harju 49:04; L. Eriksson 49:46 / Goals / 31:55 M. Oraze	Referees: (Russia) Vyacheslav Bulanov (Russia) Rafail Kadyrov

27 April; 16:15	United States	6–1 (1–0, 1–1, 4–0)	Austria	PostFinance Arena, Bern; Attendance: 3,779

Game reference
	Referees: (Czech Republic) Vladimir Sindler (Canada) Derek Zalaski
D. Brown 15:11; D. Stafford 31:04; P. O'Sullivan 40:25; J. Blake (PP2) 47:56; L. Stempniak (PP1) 52:06; M. Niskanen (PP2) 55:55 / Goals / 34:26 M. Peintner	Referees: (Czech Republic) Vladimir Sindler (Canada) Derek Zalaski

27 April; 20:15	Latvia	3–2 GWS (0–1, 2–0, 0–1) (OT: 0–0) (SO: 3–2)	Sweden	PostFinance Arena, Bern; Attendance: 4,421

Game reference
	Referees: (Slovakia) Vladimír Baluška (Switzerland) Brent Reiber
K. Rēdlihs (PP1) 30:20; L. Dārziņš 39:15; A. Ņiživijs (GWG) 65:00 / Goals / 15:26 L. Omark; 40:44 (PP1) M. Johansson	Referees: (Slovakia) Vladimír Baluška (Switzerland) Brent Reiber

29 April; 16:15	Austria	0–2 (0–1, 0–0, 0–1)	Latvia	PostFinance Arena, Bern; Attendance: 5,274

Game reference
	Referees: (Finland) Sami Partanen (Germany) Daniel Piechaczek
Goals / 19:15 M. Cipulis; 54:56 G. Džeriņš	Referees: (Finland) Sami Partanen (Germany) Daniel Piechaczek

29 April; 20:15	Sweden	6–5 OT (0–1, 2–2, 3–2) (OT: 1–0)	United States	PostFinance Arena, Bern; Attendance: 9,876

Game reference
	Referees: (Slovakia) Peter Ország (Finland) Jyri Rönn
M. Weinhandl (PP1) 25:07; M. Nilson 26:42; M. Johansson 48:46; N. Persson (SH1) 52:45; M. Weinhandl 56:19; K. Huselius 61:59 / Goals / 14:11 P. O'Sullivan; 29:58 (PP2) J. Liles; 37:26 (PP2) R. Shannon; 44:06 R. Shannon; 48:20 J. Johnson	Referees: (Slovakia) Peter Ország (Finland) Jyri Rönn

=== Group D ===
Pos	Team	Pld	W	OTW	OTL	L	GF	GA	GD	Pts	Qualification
1	Finland	3	3	0	0	0	14	4	+10	9	Qualifying round
2	Czech Republic	3	2	0	0	1	13	6	+7	6	Qualifying round
3	Norway	3	0	1	0	2	7	14	−7	2	Qualifying round
4	Denmark	3	0	0	1	2	5	15	−10	1	Relegation round

Source: IIHF

All times are local (UTC+2).

25 April; 16:15	Norway	0–5 (0–3, 0–1, 0–1)	Finland	Schluefweg, Kloten; Attendance: 5,269

Game reference
	Referees: (Slovakia) Vladimir Baluska (Slovakia) Peter Ország
Goals / 13:44 (PP1) A. Miettinen; 16:19 (PP1) J. Immonen; 19:58 (PP1) N. Kapanen; 34:20 M. Pyörälä; 44:10 (PP1) M. Lehtonen	Referees: (Slovakia) Vladimir Baluska (Slovakia) Peter Ország

25 April; 16:15	Czech Republic	5–0 (1–0, 3–0, 1–0)	Denmark	Schluefweg, Kloten; Attendance: 4,342

Game reference
	Referees: (Germany) Daniel Piechaczek (Canada) Derek Zalaski
J. Hlinka 06:09; J. Marek (PP1) 31:07; P. Čajánek (PP1) 35:18; A. Hemský (PP1) 37:24; J. Jágr (PP2) 50:46 / Goals	Referees: (Germany) Daniel Piechaczek (Canada) Derek Zalaski

27 April; 16:15	Czech Republic	5–2 (3–0, 1–2, 1–0)	Norway	Schluefweg, Kloten; Attendance: 3,583

Game reference
	Referees: (Sweden) Sören Persson (Sweden) Marcus Vinnerborg
J. Marek 05:20; P. Čajánek (PP1) 09:35; J. Vašíček 12:19; M. Blaťák 32:34; J. Klepiš 51:14 / Goals / 21:49 T. Jakobsen; 21:49 M. Zuccarello Aasen	Referees: (Sweden) Sören Persson (Sweden) Marcus Vinnerborg

27 April; 20:15	Finland	5–1 (1–1, 2–0, 2–0)	Denmark	Schluefweg, Kloten; Attendance: 3,929

Game reference
	Referees: (Switzerland) Danny Kurmann (United States) Thomas Sterns
A. Miettinen 17:40; T. Pihlman (PP1) 21:58; A. Miettinen 34:42; N. Kapanen (PP1) 51:51; N. Kapanen (PP1) 59:42 / Goals / 10:03 J. Jakobsen	Referees: (Switzerland) Danny Kurmann (United States) Thomas Sterns

29 April; 16:15	Denmark	4–5 OT (2–2, 1–1, 1–1) (OT: 0–1)	Norway	Schluefweg, Kloten; Attendance: 4,496

Game reference
	Referees: (Russia) Vyacheslav Bulanov (Russia) Rafail Kadyrov
A. Sundberg 04:56; J. Damgaard 09:33; M. Green 21:02; D. Nielsen (PP1) 46:22 / Goals / 05:40 P. Thoresen; 13:50 (SH1) A. Bastiansen; 36:18 (PP1) T. Vikingstad; 44:51 (PP1) M. Zuccarello Aasen; 61:11 T. Jakobsen	Referees: (Russia) Vyacheslav Bulanov (Russia) Rafail Kadyrov

29 April; 20:15	Finland	4–3 (1–2, 2–1, 1–0)	Czech Republic	Schluefweg, Kloten; Attendance: 6,456

Game reference
	Referees: (United States) Rick Looker (Sweden) Sören Persson
N. Kapanen 09:32; V. Koistinen (PP1) 23:52; N. Kapanen (PP2) 38:56; N. Hagman 51:39 / Goals / 10:14 (SH1) T. Rolinek; 13:30 M. Blaťák; 23:10 (PP1) A. Kotalík	Referees: (United States) Rick Looker (Sweden) Sören Persson

== Qualifying round ==
The top three teams in the standings of each group of the preliminary round advanced to the qualifying round, and were placed in two groups: teams from Groups A and D went to Group F, while teams from Groups B and C went to Group E.

Each team played three games in this round, one against each of the three teams from the other group paired with theirs. These three games, along with the two games already played against the other two advancing teams from the same group in the preliminary round, counted in the qualifying round standings.

The top four teams in both groups E and F advanced to the playoff round.

=== Group E ===
Pos	Team	Pld	W	OTW	OTL	L	GF	GA	GD	Pts	Qualification
1	Russia	5	4	1	0	0	27	11	+16	14	Playoff round
2	Sweden	5	2	1	2	0	23	18	+5	10	Playoff round
3	United States	5	2	0	2	1	19	18	+1	8	Playoff round
4	Latvia	5	1	2	0	2	15	14	+1	7	Playoff round
5	Switzerland	5	1	1	1	2	9	13	−4	6	
6	France	5	0	0	0	5	8	27	−19	0	

Source: IIHF

All times are local (UTC+2).

30 April; 16:15	Russia	6–5 OT (2–2, 1–1, 2–2) (OT: 1–0)	Sweden	PostFinance Arena, Bern; Attendance: 7,465

Game reference
	Referees: (Switzerland) Danny Kurmann (Switzerland) Brent Reiber
I. Nikulin (PP1) 11:56; O. Saprykin 14:10; D. Kalinin 27:16; S. Mozyakin 50:07; V. Proshkin (PP1) 57:38; D. Kalinin 64:04 / Goals / 02:53 R. Wallin; 18:15 A. Strålman; 23:27 N. Persson; 49:45 K. Huselius; 58:46 K. Huselius	Referees: (Switzerland) Danny Kurmann (Switzerland) Brent Reiber

30 April; 20:15	Switzerland	1–2 GWS (0–1, 0–0, 1–0) (OT: 0–0) (SO: 1–2)	Latvia	PostFinance Arena, Bern; Attendance: 9,771

Game reference
	Referees: (Slovakia) Vladimír Baluška (Canada) Derek Zalaski
A. Ambühl (PP1) 58:29 / Goals / 15:30 (PP1) M. Cipulis; 65:00 (GWG) A. Ņiživijs	Referees: (Slovakia) Vladimír Baluška (Canada) Derek Zalaski

1 May; 20:15	United States	6–2 (2–0, 3–2, 1–0)	France	PostFinance Arena, Bern; Attendance: 4,213

Game reference
	Referees: (Norway) Ole Hansen (Finland) Sami Partanen
K. Okposo (PP1) 04:02; D. Backes (PP2) 10:38; R. Shannon 24:51; K. Ballard 27:29; P. O'Sullivan 30:31; J. Johnson (PP2) 49:55 / Goals / 29:41 (PP1) Y. Treille; 31:47 (PP1) P. Bellemare	Referees: (Norway) Ole Hansen (Finland) Sami Partanen

2 May; 16:15	France	1–7 (0–1, 0–2, 1–4)	Latvia	PostFinance Arena, Bern; Attendance: 6,472

Game reference
	Referees: (Finland) Sami Partanen (Czech Republic) Vladimir Sindler
L. Tardif 51:38 / Goals / 07:29 (PP1) A. Ņiživijs; 21:19 M. Cipulis; 23:55 L. Dārziņš; 46:39 K. Skrastiņš; 48:18 A. Jerofejevs; 52:24 Ģ. Ankipāns; 52:39 M. Cipulis	Referees: (Finland) Sami Partanen (Czech Republic) Vladimir Sindler

2 May; 20:15	Russia	4–1 (3–1, 1–0, 0–0)	United States	PostFinance Arena, Bern; Attendance: 10,230

Game reference
	Referees: (Finland) Jyri Rönn (Canada) Derek Zalaski
O. Saprykin (PP1) 05:01; A. Perezhogin (PP1) 09:51; S. Mozyakin 17:06; A. Radulov (PP1) 21:36 / Goals / 03:16 L. Stempniak	Referees: (Finland) Jyri Rönn (Canada) Derek Zalaski

3 May; 16:15	Switzerland	1–4 (0–1, 0–1, 1–2)	Sweden	PostFinance Arena, Bern; Attendance: 11,327

Game reference
	Referees: (Norway) Ole Hansen (Finland) Jyri Rönn
R. Lemm (PP1) 56:44 / Goals / 05:47 J. Oduya; 24:59 (PP1) J. Harju; 46:41 L. Omark; 55:06 J. Andersson	Referees: (Norway) Ole Hansen (Finland) Jyri Rönn

3 May; 20:15	Latvia	1–6 (0–1, 1–3, 0–2)	Russia	PostFinance Arena, Bern; Attendance: 7,228

Game reference
	Referees: (Slovakia) Peter Ország (Switzerland) Brent Reiber
H. Vasiļjevs (PP1) 36:05 / Goals / 11:43 (PP1) A. Kuryanov; 21:01 A. Tereshchenko; 23:04 (PP1) O. Tverdovsky; 23:50 A. Kuryanov; 43:38 A. Frolov; 46:28 O. Tverdovsky	Referees: (Slovakia) Peter Ország (Switzerland) Brent Reiber

4 May; 16:15	Sweden	6–3 (3–0, 2–3, 1–0)	France	PostFinance Arena, Bern; Attendance: 5,051

Game reference
	Referees: (Slovakia) Vladimir Baluska (Czech Republic) Vladimir Sindler
K. Huselius 01:33; M. Nilson 04:26; D. Tärnström (PP1) 05:56; C. Gunnarsson (PP1) 21:28; J. Oduya 30:55; K. Jönsson (PP1) 45:40 / Goals / 23:21 A. Lussier; 29:25 (PP1) P. Bellemare; 36:41 (PP1) S. Treille	Referees: (Slovakia) Vladimir Baluska (Czech Republic) Vladimir Sindler

4 May; 20:15	United States	3–4 OT (0–1, 3–1, 0–1) (OT: 0–1)	Switzerland	PostFinance Arena, Bern; Attendance: 10,317

Game reference
	Referees: (Slovakia) Peter Ország (Germany) Daniel Piechaczek
R. Hainsey (PP1) 25:57; C. Higgins 35:08; R. Hainsey (PP2) 39:48 / Goals / 09:42 (PP2) A. Ambühl; 31:03 R. Lemm; 49:42 M. Plüss; 60:13 R. Wick	Referees: (Slovakia) Peter Ország (Germany) Daniel Piechaczek

=== Group F ===
Pos	Team	Pld	W	OTW	OTL	L	GF	GA	GD	Pts	Qualification
1	Canada	5	4	0	1	0	26	10	+16	13	Playoff round
2	Finland	5	2	2	1	0	16	9	+7	11	Playoff round
3	Czech Republic	5	3	0	0	2	20	11	+9	9	Playoff round
4	Belarus	5	0	3	0	2	8	13	−5	6	Playoff round
5	Slovakia	5	0	1	2	2	8	21	−13	4	
6	Norway	5	0	0	2	3	7	21	−14	2	

Source: IIHF

All times are local (UTC+2).

30 April; 16:15	Belarus	3–2 OT (0–1, 1–1, 1–0) (OT: 1–0)	Norway	Schluefweg, Kloten; Attendance: 3,374

Game reference
	Referees: (Germany) Daniel Piechaczek (United States) Thomas Sterns
A. Ugarov (PP1) 22:45; M. Grabovski (PP1) 41:51; R. Salei 64:35 / Goals / 06:15 P. Thoresen; 20:38 (PP1) M. Trygg	Referees: (Germany) Daniel Piechaczek (United States) Thomas Sterns

30 April; 20:15	Canada	5–1 (3–0, 0–0, 2–1)	Czech Republic	Schluefweg, Kloten; Attendance: 5,967

Game reference
	Referees: (Russia) Vyacheslav Bulanov (Sweden) Marcus Vinnerborg
S. Stamkos (PP1) 07:20; S. Stamkos (PP1) 13:40; S. Weber (PP1) 17:05; D. Heatley 40:22; M. St. Louis 49:55 / Goals / 57:20 A. Hemský	Referees: (Russia) Vyacheslav Bulanov (Sweden) Marcus Vinnerborg

1 May; 20:15	Finland	2–1 OT (1–0, 0–1, 0–0) (OT: 1–0)	Slovakia	Schluefweg, Kloten; Attendance: 4,444

Game reference
	Referees: (Russia) Rafail Kadyrov (Sweden) Sören Persson
S. Kapanen (SH1) 15:05; S. Kapanen 63:39 / Goals / 22:01 L. Bartečko	Referees: (Russia) Rafail Kadyrov (Sweden) Sören Persson

2 May; 16:15	Czech Republic	8–0 (4–0, 4–0, 0–0)	Slovakia	Schluefweg, Kloten; Attendance: 5,165

Game reference
	Referees: (Switzerland) Brent Reiber (United States) Thomas Sterns
J. Jágr 06:35; J. Jágr 09:08; M. Blaťák (PP2) 12:48; R. Červenka 15:25; A. Kotalík 25:07; R. Červenka 29:08; M. Michálek 30:12; P. Eliáš 38:14 / Goals	Referees: (Switzerland) Brent Reiber (United States) Thomas Sterns

2 May; 20:15	Finland	1–2 GWS (0–1, 1–0, 0–0) (OT: 0–0) (SO: 2–3)	Belarus	Schluefweg, Kloten; Attendance: 5,621

Game reference
	Referees: (Switzerland) Danny Kurmann (Sweden) Marcus Vinnerborg
J. Niskala (PP1) 33:22 / Goals / 00:05 S. Demagin; 65:00 (GWS) O. Antonenko	Referees: (Switzerland) Danny Kurmann (Sweden) Marcus Vinnerborg

3 May; 16:15	Norway	1–5 (1–3, 0–2, 0–0)	Canada	Schluefweg, Kloten; Attendance: 4,023

Game reference
	Referees: (United States) Rick Looker (Sweden) Sören Persson
M. Zuccarello Aasen (PP1) 12:53 / Goals / 04:40 (PP1) M. Lombardi; 17:08 D. Hamhuis; 18:03 S. Stamkos; 20:37 J. Spezza; 32:07 D. Doughty	Referees: (United States) Rick Looker (Sweden) Sören Persson

3 May; 20:15	Belarus	0–3 (0–0, 0–2, 0–1)	Czech Republic	Schluefweg, Kloten; Attendance: 3,495

Game reference
	Referees: (Switzerland) Danny Kurmann (Germany) Daniel Piechaczek
Goals / 30:02 (SH1) P. Čajánek; 39:03 (PP1) P. Eliáš; 55:52 P. Čajánek	Referees: (Switzerland) Danny Kurmann (Germany) Daniel Piechaczek

4 May; 16:15	Slovakia	3–2 OT (2–0, 0–1, 0–1) (OT: 1–0)	Norway	Schluefweg, Kloten; Attendance: 2,901

Game reference
	Referees: (Russia) Rafail Kadyrov (United States) Rick Looker
Š. Ružička (PP1) 07:22; P. Smrek 09:09; L. Nagy (PP1) 62:07 / Goals / 27:21 (PP1) A. Bastiansen; 45:27 (PP1) L. E. Lund	Referees: (Russia) Rafail Kadyrov (United States) Rick Looker

4 May; 20:15	Canada	3–4 GWS (1–2, 1–1, 1–0) (OT: 0–0) (SO: 2–3)	Finland	Schluefweg, Kloten; Attendance: 5,970

Game reference
	Referees: (Russia) Vyacheslav Bulanov (Sweden) Marcus Vinneborg
J. Spezza (PP1) 16:02; D. Heatley (PP1) 38:16; D. Heatley (PP1) 49:20 / Goals / 04:02 T. Pihlman; 07:54 A. Salmela; 37:22 (PP1) N. Kapanen; 65:00 (GWS) H. Hyvönen	Referees: (Russia) Vyacheslav Bulanov (Sweden) Marcus Vinneborg

== Relegation round ==
The bottom team in the standings from each group of the preliminary round played in the relegation round. Germany, as hosts of the 2010 tournament, were guaranteed to stay in the top division. Denmark, the best ranked team in the group from the other three teams, stayed in the top division for 2010, while Austria and Hungary were relegated to the Division I tournament.

=== Group G ===
Pos	Team	Pld	W	OTW	OTL	L	GF	GA	GD	Pts	Qualification or relegation
1	Denmark	3	3	0	0	0	13	4	+9	9	Qualified for the 2010 Top Division
2	Austria	3	2	0	0	1	9	5	+4	6	Relegated to the 2010 Division I
3	Germany	3	1	0	0	2	3	5	−2	3	Qualified for the 2010 Top Division as hosts
4	Hungary	3	0	0	0	3	2	13	−11	0	Relegated to the 2010 Division I

Source: IIHF

All times are local (UTC+2).

1 May; 16:15	Germany	1–3 (1–1, 0–0, 0–2)	Denmark	PostFinance Arena, Bern; Attendance: 4,241

Game reference
	Referees: (Slovakia) Peter Ország (Czech Republic) Vladimir Sindler
C. Schubert 13:23 / Goals / 10:27 M. Bødker; 49:52 P. Regin; 53:27 (PP1) N. Hardt	Referees: (Slovakia) Peter Ország (Czech Republic) Vladimir Sindler

1 May; 16:15	Austria	6–0 (1–0, 3–0, 2–0)	Hungary	Schluefweg, Kloten; Attendance: 4,042

Game reference
	Referees: (United States) Rick Looker (Finland) Jyri Rönn
T. Koch 19:13; T. Koch 20:43; O. Setzinger (PP1) 23:56; T. Vanek (PP1) 33:27; T. Koch (PP1) 58:48; R. Kaspitz 59:36 / Goals	Referees: (United States) Rick Looker (Finland) Jyri Rönn

3 May; 12:15	Germany	0–1 (0–0, 0–1, 0–0)	Austria	PostFinance Arena, Bern; Attendance: 3,828

Game reference
	Referees: (Slovakia) Vladimir Baluska (Russia) Vyacheslav Bulanov
Goals / T. Koch 27:41	Referees: (Slovakia) Vladimir Baluska (Russia) Vyacheslav Bulanov

3 May; 12:15	Hungary	1–5 (1–0, 0–2, 0–3)	Denmark	Schluefweg, Kloten; Attendance: 3,672

Game reference
	Referees: (Russia) Rafail Kadyrov (Canada) Derek Zalaski
K. Palkovics 15:10 / Goals / 28:34 (PP2) K. Staal; 38:35 M. Christensen; 48:25 (PP1) M. Green; 52:48 M. Madsen; 55:19 (PP1) N. Hardt	Referees: (Russia) Rafail Kadyrov (Canada) Derek Zalaski

4 May; 12:15	Hungary	1–2 (1–1, 0–1, 0–0)	Germany	PostFinance Arena, Bern; Attendance: 3,497

Game reference
	Referees: (Norway) Ole Hansen (United States) Thomas Sterns
A. Horváth (PP2) 17:09 / Goals / 03:11 (PP1) M. Müller; 33:23 (PP1) M. Bakos	Referees: (Norway) Ole Hansen (United States) Thomas Sterns

4 May; 12:15	Denmark	5–2 (1–2, 1–0, 3–0)	Austria	Schluefweg, Kloten; Attendance: 2,798

Game reference
	Referees: (Finland) Sami Partanen (Sweden) Sören Persson
J. Jakobsen 15:14; M. Bødker (SH1) 27:51; M. Christensen 45:46; K. Degn 51:10; M. Bødker (EN) 59:23 / Goals / 00:48 R. Kaspitz; 02:30 (SH1) O. Setzinger	Referees: (Finland) Sami Partanen (Sweden) Sören Persson

== Playoff round ==
=== Bracket ===
Quarterfinals
E1	Russia	4
F4	Belarus	3
F2	Finland	2
E3	United States	3
F1	Canada	4
E4	Latvia	2
E2	Sweden	3
F3	Czech Republic	1

Semifinals
QF1	Russia	3
QF2	United States	2
QF3	Canada	3
QF4	Sweden	1

Finals
SF1	Russia	2
SF2	Canada	1
Bronze medal game
SF1	United States	2
SF2	Sweden	4

=== Quarter-finals ===
6 May; 16:15	Russia	4–3 (0–0, 3–3, 1–0)	Belarus	PostFinance Arena, Bern; Attendance: 8,337

Game reference
	Referees: (Finland) Jyri Rönn (Canada) Derek Zalaski
V. Proshkin 25:18; V. Atyushov 36:39; A. Frolov 37:02; I. Kovalchuk 47:22 (PP1) / Goals / 22:39 (PP1) K. Koltsov; 33:52 O. Antonenko; 39:22 (PP2) R. Salei	Referees: (Finland) Jyri Rönn (Canada) Derek Zalaski

6 May; 20:15	Finland	2–3 (0–0, 2–3, 0–0)	United States	PostFinance Arena, Bern; Attendance: 9,334

Game reference
	Referees: (Germany) Daniel Piechaczek (Switzerland) Brent Reiber
N. Kapanen (PP1) 20:57; H. Hyvönen 37:50 / Goals / 30:31 (PP1) D. Brown; 32:11 T. J. Oshie; 34:19 R. Suter	Referees: (Germany) Daniel Piechaczek (Switzerland) Brent Reiber

7 May; 16:15	Canada	4–2 (0–0, 3–1, 1–1)	Latvia	PostFinance Arena, Bern; Attendance: 8,042

Game reference
	Referees: (Switzerland) Danny Kurmann (Slovakia) Peter Ország
D Heatley 26:37; D. Hamhuis (PP1) 34:03; S. Stamkos (PP1) 37:47; M. Lombardi 43:07 / Goals / 37:30 (SH1) G. Galviņš; 41:27 H. Vasiļjevs	Referees: (Switzerland) Danny Kurmann (Slovakia) Peter Ország

7 May; 20:15	Sweden	3–1 (0–0, 2–0, 1–1)	Czech Republic	PostFinance Arena, Bern; Attendance: 10,415

Game reference
	Referees: (United States) Rick Looker (United States) Thomas Sterns
M. Weinhandl (PP2) 23:53; D. Tärnström (PP1) 38:49; K. Jönsson 57:46 / Goals / 48:48 (SH2) P. Čajánek	Referees: (United States) Rick Looker (United States) Thomas Sterns

=== Semi-finals ===
8 May; 16:15	Russia	3–2 (0–0, 2–2, 1–0)	United States	PostFinance Arena, Bern; Attendance: 11,057

Game reference
	Referees: (Switzerland) Brent Reiber (Sweden) Marcus Vinnerborg
I. Kovalchuk 31:20; A. Frolov 34:25; K. Gorovikov (PP1) 58:13 / Goals / 23:46 D. Brown; 38:03 K. Okposo	Referees: (Switzerland) Brent Reiber (Sweden) Marcus Vinnerborg

8 May; 20:15	Canada	3–1 (1–0, 2–0, 0–1)	Sweden	PostFinance Arena, Bern; Attendance: 11,477

Game reference
	Referees: (Russia) Vyacheslav Bulanov (Switzerland) Danny Kurmann
D. Roy 06:51; S. Horcoff 29:53; D. Roy (PP1) 30:38 / Goals / 46:14 L. Eriksson	Referees: (Russia) Vyacheslav Bulanov (Switzerland) Danny Kurmann

=== Bronze Medal Game ===
10 May; 16:00	Sweden	4–2 (0–0, 2–1, 2–1)	United States	PostFinance Arena, Bern; Attendance: 11,249

Game reference
	Referees: (Russia) Rafail Kadyrov (Switzerland) Brent Reiber
L. Eriksson (PP1) 33:24; T. Mårtensson (PP2) 35:57; C. Gunnarsson (PP1) 49:00; J. Oduya (PP2) 59:59 (EN) / Goals / 25:14 (PP1) J. Johnson; 42:15 J. Pavelski	Referees: (Russia) Rafail Kadyrov (Switzerland) Brent Reiber

=== Gold Medal Game ===
10 May; 20:30	Russia	2–1 (1–1, 1–0, 0–0)	Canada	PostFinance Arena, Bern; Attendance: 11,454

Game reference
	Referees: (Slovakia) Peter Ország (Finland) Jyri Rönn
O. Saprykin (PP1) 12:59; A. Radulov 34:30 / Goals / 05:37 J. Spezza	Referees: (Slovakia) Peter Ország (Finland) Jyri Rönn

== Ranking and statistics ==
2009 IIHF World Championship winners

Russia
2nd/25th title

=== Tournament Awards ===
- Best players selected by the directorate:
  - Best Goaltender: (Belarus) Andrei Mezin
  - Best Defenceman: (Canada) Shea Weber
  - Best Forward: (Russia) Ilya Kovalchuk
  - Most Valuable Player: (Russia) Ilya Kovalchuk
- Media All-Star Team:
  - Goaltender: (Belarus) Andrei Mezin
  - Defence: (Sweden) Kenny Jönsson, (Canada) Shea Weber
  - Forward: (Russia) Ilya Kovalchuk, (Canada) Steven Stamkos, (Canada) Martin St. Louis

=== Final standings ===
The final standings of the tournament according to IIHF:

1st place, gold medalist(s)	Russia
2nd place, silver medalist(s)	Canada
3rd place, bronze medalist(s)	Sweden
4	United States
5	Finland
6	Czech Republic
7	Latvia
8	Belarus
9	Switzerland
10	Slovakia
11	Norway
12	France
13	Denmark
14	Austria
15	Germany*
16	Hungary

* Hosts of the 2010 WC, therefore exempt from relegation.

=== Scoring leaders ===
List shows the top skaters sorted by points, then goals. If the list exceeds 10 skaters because of a tie in points, all of the tied skaters are left out.

Player	GP	G	A	Pts	+/−	PIM	POS
(Canada) Martin St. Louis	9	4	11	15	+8	2	FW
(Russia) Ilya Kovalchuk	9	5	9	14	+8	4	FW
(Sweden) Mattias Weinhandl	9	5	7	12	+1	8	FW
(Canada) Shea Weber	9	4	8	12	+5	6	D
(Canada) Jason Spezza	9	7	4	11	+4	2	FW
(Canada) Steven Stamkos	9	7	4	11	+9	6	FW
(Finland) Niko Kapanen	7	7	3	10	+1	2	FW
(Canada) Dany Heatley	9	6	4	10	+3	8	FW
(Czech Republic) Petr Čajánek	7	5	5	10	+7	10	FW
(Russia) Alexander Radulov	9	4	6	10	+7	10	FW

GP = Games played; G = Goals; A = Assists; Pts = Points; +/− = Plus/minus; PIM = Penalties in minutes; POS = Position
Source: IIHF.com

=== Leading goaltenders ===
Only the top five goaltenders, based on save percentage, who have played 40% of their team's minutes are included in this list.

Player	TOI	SA	GA	GAA	Sv%	SO
(Canada) Chris Mason	240:00	114	4	1.00	96.49	1
(Belarus) Andrei Mezin	314:05	172	9	1.72	94.77	0
(Canada) Dwayne Roloson	303:52	158	11	2.17	93.04	0
(Russia) Ilya Bryzgalov	404:04	198	14	2.08	92.93	1
(Latvia) Edgars Masaļskis	426:26	233	18	2.53	92.83	1

TOI = Time on ice (minutes:seconds); SA = Shots against; GA = Goals against; GAA = Goals against average; Sv% = Save percentage; SO = Shutouts
Source: IIHF.com

== IIHF Broadcasting rights ==
Standard Definition
Country	Broadcaster
Austria	ORF
Belarus	BTRC
Canada	TSN
Canada	RDS
Czech Republic	Czech Television
Denmark	TV2
Finland	YLE
Finland	Viasat Sport
Finland	Urheilukanava
France	Sport+
Germany	DSF
Hungary	Sport1
Latvia	TV3
Latvia	TV6
Latvia	Viasat Sport Baltic
Latvia	3+ Latvia
Norway	NRK
Norway	SportN
Poland	Polsat Sport
Romania	Sport1
Russia	VGTRK
Slovakia	STV
Sweden	TV6
Sweden	Viasat Sport
Switzerland	SRG SSR idée suisse
United States	Universal Sports

High Definition
Country	Broadcaster
Austria	ORF1 HD
Canada	TSN HD
Canada	RDS HD
Czech Republic	ČT HD
Denmark	TV2 Sport HD
Finland	Viasat Sport HD
Norway	Viasat Sport HD
Sweden	Viasat Sport HD
Switzerland	HD Suisse

== IIHF honors and awards ==
The 2009 IIHF Hall of Fame induction ceremony has held in Bern during the World Championships. Harald Griebel of Germany was given the Paul Loicq Award for outstanding contributions to international ice hockey.

IIHF Hall of Fame inductees

- Walter Bush, United States
- Rudi Hiti, Slovenia
- Alexei Kasatonov, Russia
- László Schell, Hungary
- Jan Suchý, Czech Republic

== See also ==
- 2009 World Junior Ice Hockey Championships
- 2009 Women's World Ice Hockey Championships
- 2009 IIHF World U18 Championships
- 2009 IIHF World Women's U18 Championship
