= Džeriņš =

Origin
- Origin: Latvian

Džeriņš (feminine: Džeriņa) is a Latvian topographic surname. Individuals with the surname include:

- Andris Džeriņš (born 1988), Latvian professional ice hockey player;
- Guntis Džeriņš (born 1985), Latvian professional ice hockey player;
- Ralfs Džeriņš (born 1997), Latvian professional football player.
