= Peterdi =

Peterdi is a surname. Notable people with the surname include:

- Gabor Peterdi (1915–2001), American-Hungarian artist
- Imre Peterdi (born 1980), Hungarian ice hockey player
