= Anton Kuryanov =

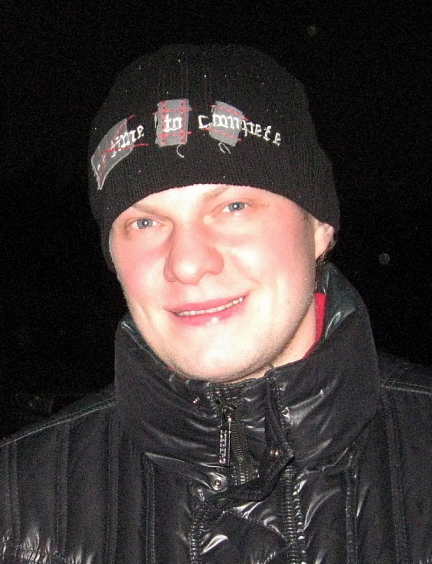
- Born: March 11, 1983 (age 42); Ust-Kamenogorsk, Kazakh SSR; Soviet Union
- Height: 5 ft 9 in (175 cm)
- Weight: 180 lb (82 kg; 12 st 12 lb)
- Position: Centre
- Shoots: Left
- Czech.1 team Former teams: HC Kladno; Sibir Novosibirsk; Avangard Omsk; Traktor Chelyabinsk; HC Yugra
- National team: Russia
- Playing career: 1999–present

Anton Kuryanov (Russian: Антон Курьянов; born March 11, 1983) is a professional ice hockey centre forward who is currently playing for HC Kladno of the WSM Liga (Czech.1).

== Playing career ==
Kuryanov started his career in Ust-Kamenogorsk before moving to Omsk in 1998 along with his coach Sergei Gersonsky and a bunch of other talented youngsters, including Alexander Perezhogin. Since he was considered less talented than other young forwards like Alexander Svitov and Stanislav Chistov who played in Avangard Omsk at the time, Kuryanov's path to seniors was a difficult one. He was sent on loan to Mostovik (Kurgan) and then HC Sibir Novosibirsk to gain first-team experience before making his debut for Avangard in the 2002–03 season.

In his first full season in Avangard's jersey, Anton Kuryanov helped his team to win the title tallying 14 points in the process. He then went from strength to strength getting capped for Russia in December 2004 and becoming fans' favourite at his own club. In the 2006–07 season, Kuryanov scored 30 goals which became the record for an Avangard player. On October 13, 2008, Kuryanov suffered a major career setback and a psychological blow when Alexei Cherepanov with whom they played in the same line collapsed on the bench and died during the game against Vityaz Chekhov.

Anton Kyryanov also achieved significant success on the international arena when he was invited to represent his country at the 2009 IIHF World Championship which Russia went on to win. Kuryanov scored 3 times and made 3 assists during his 9 games at the tournament. He dedicated this victory to Cherepanov.

== Career statistics ==
=== Regular season and playoffs ===
| | | | Regular season | | | | | Playoffs |
| Season | Team | League | GP | G | A | Pts | PIM | GP | G | A | Pts | PIM |
|---|---|---|---|---|---|---|---|---|---|---|---|---|
| 2002–03 | Sibir Novosibirsk | RSL | 26 | 1 | 4 | 5 | 8 | — | — | — | — | — |
| 2002–03 | Avangard Omsk | RSL | 3 | 0 | 0 | 0 | 0 | — | — | — | — | — |
| 2003–04 | Avangard Omsk | RSL | 50 | 7 | 6 | 13 | 14 | 11 | 0 | 1 | 1 | 6 |
| 2004–05 | Avangard Omsk | RSL | 55 | 12 | 14 | 26 | 24 | 11 | 1 | 2 | 3 | 4 |
| 2005–06 | Avangard Omsk | RSL | 40 | 11 | 10 | 21 | 20 | 13 | 1 | 4 | 5 | 8 |
| 2006–07 | Avangard Omsk | RSL | 50 | 24 | 21 | 45 | 32 | 10 | 6 | 3 | 9 | 2 |
| 2007–08 | Avangard Omsk | RSL | 51 | 18 | 20 | 38 | 24 | — | — | — | — | — |
| 2008–09 | Avangard Omsk | KHL | 45 | 14 | 23 | 37 | 26 | 9 | 0 | 5 | 5 | 6 |
| 2009–10 | Avangard Omsk | KHL | 45 | 13 | 18 | 31 | 8 | — | — | — | — | — |
| 2010–11 | Avangard Omsk | KHL | 49 | 17 | 19 | 36 | 22 | 13 | 3 | 4 | 7 | 2 |
| 2011–12 | Avangard Omsk | KHL | 41 | 3 | 9 | 12 | 14 | 21 | 3 | 4 | 7 | 2 |
| 2012–13 | Avangard Omsk | KHL | 36 | 8 | 11 | 19 | 12 | 12 | 1 | 2 | 3 | 4 |
| 2013–14 | Traktor Chelyabinsk | KHL | 13 | 0 | 1 | 1 | 6 | — | — | — | — | — |
| 2013–14 | Avangard Omsk | KHL | 30 | 5 | 4 | 9 | 26 | — | — | — | — | — |
| 2014–15 | Avangard Omsk | KHL | 24 | 1 | 3 | 4 | 8 | 5 | 1 | 0 | 1 | 2 |
| 2015–16 | Avangard Omsk | KHL | 22 | 4 | 3 | 7 | 6 | 1 | 0 | 0 | 0 | 0 |
| 2016–17 | HC Yugra | KHL | 48 | 4 | 10 | 14 | 38 | — | — | — | — | — |
| 2017–18 | HC Yugra | KHL | 18 | 0 | 4 | 4 | 6 | — | — | — | — | — |
| | RSL totals | | 275 | 73 | 75 | 148 | 122 | 45 | 8 | 10 | 18 | 20 |
| | KHL totals | | 371 | 69 | 105 | 174 | 172 | 61 | 8 | 15 | 23 | 16 |

Medal record

Representing Russia

Ice hockey

World Championships
| Gold medal – first place | 2009 Switzerland | |

=== International ===
| Year | Team | Event | Result | GP | G | A | Pts | PIM |
|---|---|---|---|---|---|---|---|---|
| 2009 | Russia | WC | 1st place, gold medalist(s) | 9 | 3 | 3 | 6 | 6 |
| Senior totals | | | | 9 | 3 | 3 | 6 | 6 |
