= Mattias Weinhandl =

Swedish ice hockey player

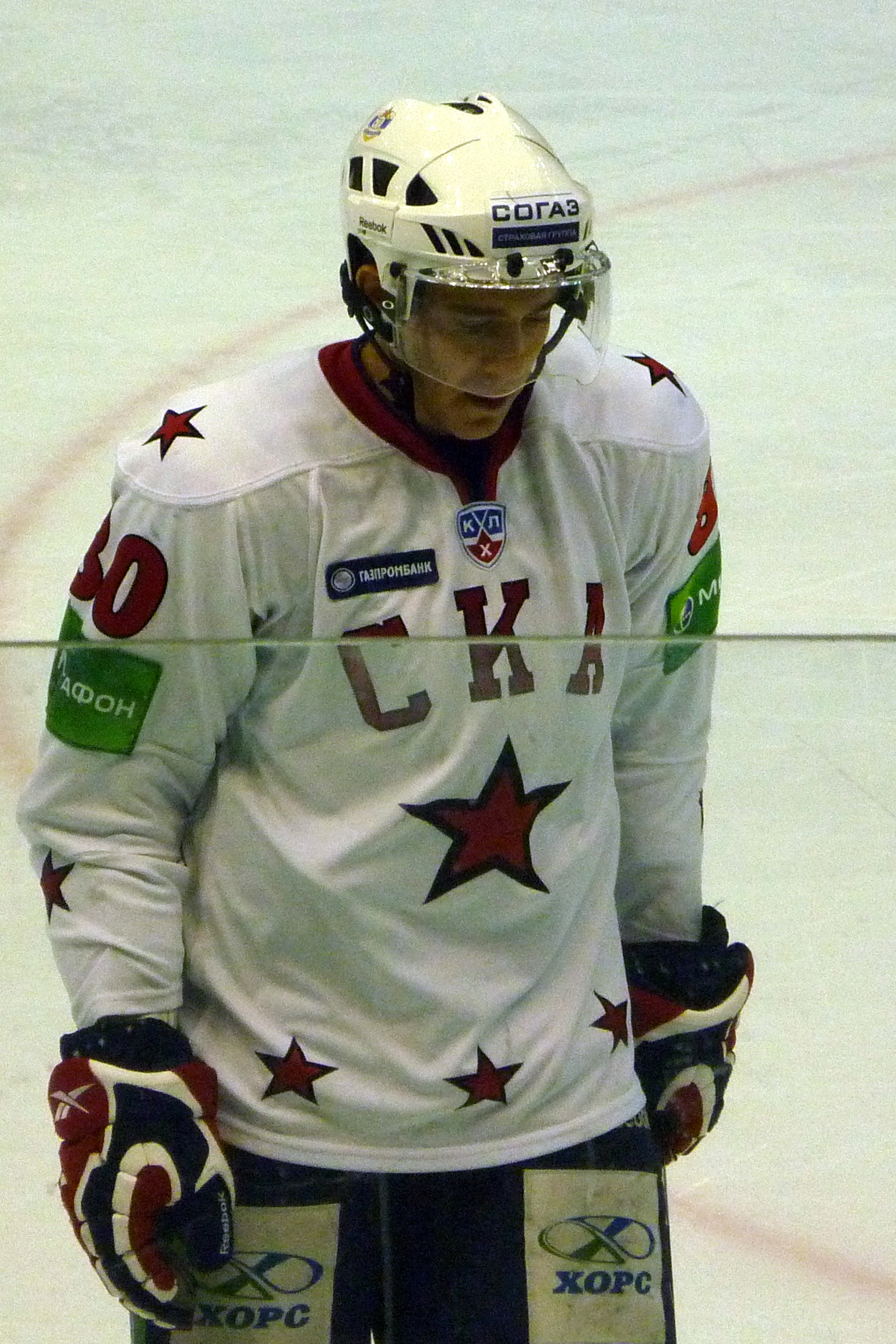
- Weinhandl with SKA Saint Petersburg in 2010
- Born: June 1, 1980 (age 46) Ljungby, Sweden
- Height: 6 ft 0 in (183 cm)
- Weight: 185 lb (84 kg; 13 st 3 lb)
- Position: Right wing
- Shot: Right
- Played for: Modo Hockey; New York Islanders; Minnesota Wild; Linköpings HC; HC Dynamo Moscow; SKA Saint Petersburg
- National team: Sweden
- NHL draft: 78th overall, 1999; New York Islanders
- Playing career: 1999–2014

Mattias John Erich Weinhandl (born June 1, 1980) is a Swedish former professional ice hockey right winger who last played for Linköpings HC of the Swedish Elitserien.

Weinhandl was drafted 78th overall by the New York Islanders in the 1999 NHL entry draft. He played 182 career NHL games for the Islanders and the Minnesota Wild, scoring 19 goals and 37 assists for 56 points. He overcame a serious eye injury in 1999 to make the Islanders squad two seasons later.

== Playing career ==
On November 13, 1999, the 19-year-old Weinhandl was playing for Team Sweden in a game against the Czech Republic in the U-20 Four Nations Tournament. Approximately 51 minutes into the game, Weinhandl was struck in the left eye by Czech player Michal Trávníček's stick. The incident came mere seconds after Weinhandl hooked Trávníček in the hip area to prevent him from getting past him. Trávníček fell down and upon rising, assaulted Weinhandl with his stick, aiming it in a way that it would reach under Weinhandl's half visor and strike the Swede in the face. Weinhandl's forehead was fractured and his vision in the eye was reduced to 10%. The International Ice Hockey Federation (IIHF) judged the incident to be an attack and banned Trávníček from participating in international play for three years.

=== NHL ===
==== New York Islanders ====
Weinhandl broke into the NHL during the 2002–03 season. He tallied his first NHL point (an assist) in his first NHL game on November 4, 2002 against the Calgary Flames. He picked up his first NHL goal 23 days later, on November 27, against the Ottawa Senators' goalie Patrick Lalime. He played in that season's YoungStars game, which took place in Sunrise, Florida during the All-Star break and picked up a goal and an assist. He missed a number of games during the early part of the season due to a sprained shoulder, but finished the year with 23 points (six goals and 17 assists) in 47 games.

The following season, Weinhandl was forced to start the season for the Islanders' minor league team, the Bridgeport Sound Tigers, to rehab an ankle injury that kept him out of the 2003 playoffs and required surgery over the summer. Upon being deemed fit to play for the Islanders, Weinhandl played for the most part on a line with Alexei Yashin, and notched 20 points (eight goals and 12 assists) in 55 games.

==== Minnesota Wild ====
Upon returning from his 2004–05 campaign in Sweden, Weinhandl was quickly signed to a two-year, $1.6 million contract to keep him with the Islanders. Weinhandl played mostly on the team's fourth line. He recorded six points (two goals and four assists) in 53 games for the Islanders before he was waived and claimed by the Minnesota Wild on March 4, 2006. In 15 games for Minnesota, Weinhandl picked up two goals and three assists.

In the 2006–07 season, Weinhandl was a healthy scratch in 13 of the team's first 28 games (missing an additional three games after suffering a concussion) before being waived by the Wild on December 8, 2006.

=== AHL ===
==== Houston Aeros ====
Unclaimed he was assigned to the Wild's minor league affiliate, the Houston Aeros, on December 9. Before being sent down, he tallied one goal and one assist in 12 games.

Weinhandl found some success in the minor league. He played in 48 games with the Aeros, scoring 18 goals and 27 assists with a total of 20 penalty minutes. During that span, he had several multi-point games, including four assists in one of the final games of the season.

=== Elitserien ===
==== Modo ====
From the 1999–00 season to the 2001–02 season, Weinhandl played for Modo in the Swedish elite league Elitserien. His first season there, he was on a very successful line with Henrik and Daniel Sedin, who each went on to have long careers with the NHL's Vancouver Canucks. The line was dubbed "Line 19", as Weinhandl and both Sedins were 19-years-of-age at the time. He returned to play for Modo again in the 2004–05 season due to the NHL lockout. Weinhandl led the team in scoring with 46 points (26 goals and 20 assists) in 50 games and was third in the league in points, behind only Henrik Zetterberg of Timrå and Kristian Huselius of Linköping, and tied with Shawn Horcoff of Mora.

==== Linköping ====
Weinhandl signed with Linköping on April 22, 2007. He signed a two-year deal worth 7.2 million Swedish kronor, with an option for a third year. During the 2007–08 season, Weinhandl enjoyed a good return to Sweden, scoring 35 goals to win the Håkan Loob Trophy. He also netted 27 assists for a total of 62 points, second in the league only to his line mate Tony Mårtensson.

Weinhandl drew the attention of the Russian Superleague (RSL) and on April 23, 2008, it was announced that he would be loaned out to Dynamo Moscow in the Russian Kontinental Hockey League (KHL) for the 2008–09 season. That same day, he also signed a contract extension with Linköping, ensuring his return and keeping him in Linköping's possession through 2012.

After Linköping's early exit in the 2009 Elitserien playoffs, it seemed that the team would bring back all of their loaned players, including Weinhandl. However, it was announced on April 14 that Weinhandl would be staying with Dynamo Moscow in Russia for another season.

On April 21, 2012, it was announced that Weinhandl would be returning to Linköping and play there for at least two more years, much to the liking of the fans.

On April 26, 2014, Weinhandl officially announced his retirement as a player due to injuries.

=== Kontinental Hockey League ===
==== Dynamo Moscow ====
Weinhandl's first season in Russia was not quite as successful as he might have hoped — he suffered a knee injury late in the pre-season that caused him to miss the first fourteen games of the season. He finished the regular season with 16 goals and 17 assists in 41 games. Dynamo was a participant in the 2008 Spengler Cup that took place in December 2008. Weinhandl, along with his teammate Dmitry Afanasenkov, led the tournament in scoring with seven points apiece and helped Dynamo win the tournament for the second time in their history.

Weinhandl elevated his game in the 2009 KHL playoffs, scoring 16 points in 12 games, and was among the statistical leaders in several offensive categories. In addition, he was named the league's best forward in the month of March, based on his play in the playoffs. The team made it to the semi-final round, where it was eliminated by the eventual Gagarin Cup winner Ak Bars Kazan.

Weinhandl returned to Dynamo Moscow for the 2009–10 season, scoring 60 points in 56 games. This placed him again among the statistical league leaders, most notably as the top scoring foreign (non-Russian) player. He was also named best forward for the month of October. Dynamo fared poorly in the playoffs that season and was eliminated in the first round.

==== SKA St. Petersburg ====
After the 2009-2010 season, Dynamo Moscow was disbanded and Weinhandl was instead contracted by SKA St Petersburg prior to 2010-2011 season. During this season he has been reunited with his old line-mate from Linköping, Tony Mårtensson, and former Islanders teammate Alexei Yashin. SKA took part in the 2010 Spengler Cup tournament in Davos, Switzerland, in December 2010. Weinhandl helped his team beat Team Canada in the final to win the tournament for the fourth time in team history and the first time since 1977. It was also the third year in a row that a team from the KHL won the tournament.

=== Return to Sweden ===
Weinhandl left the KHL after four seasons and returned to his native Sweden in signing a contract with former club Linköpings HC. In the midst of his second season with the club, and having sat out the entirety of year due to lingering concussion symptoms, Weinhandl announced his retirement from professional hockey on April 26, 2014.

== International play ==
Medal record

Representing Sweden

Men's ice hockey

World Championships
Bronze medal – third place	2010 Germany	
Bronze medal – third place	2009 Switzerland	
Bronze medal – third place	2002 Sweden	

Weinhandl has played for Sweden's national team often in his career, including the 1999 IIHF World U20 Championship, and the IIHF World Championships in 2002, 2005, 2008, 2009, and 2010. Weinhandl was among the top scorers in both the 2008 and 2009 tournaments, ending up tied for third in total points each year. In 2009, he helped the Tre Kronor win bronze, their first medal since winning the gold in 2006.

On December 27, 2009, Weinhandl was named to the 2010 Swedish Olympic national team.

== Career statistics ==
=== Regular season and playoffs ===
			Regular season					Playoffs
Season	Team	League	GP	G	A	Pts	PIM	GP	G	A	Pts	PIM
1995–96	IF Troja/Ljungby	J20-2	28	38	40	78	—	—	—	—	—	—
1996–97	IF Troja/Ljungby	J20-2	48	61	69	130	46	—	—	—	—	—
1997–98	IF Troja/Ljungby	SWE-2	28	3	2	5	2	—	—	—	—	—
1998–99	IF Troja/Ljungby	SWE-2	42	20	19	39	28	—	—	—	—	—
1999–00	Modo Hockey	J20	1	2	2	4	2	—	—	—	—	—
1999–00	Modo Hockey	SEL	32	15	9	24	6	13	5	3	8	8
2000–01	Modo Hockey	SEL	48	16	16	32	14	6	1	3	4	6
2001–02	Modo Hockey	SEL	50	18	16	34	10	14	4	11	15	4
2002–03	Bridgeport Sound Tigers	AHL	23	9	12	21	14	—	—	—	—	—
2002–03	New York Islanders	NHL	47	6	17	23	10	—	—	—	—	—
2003–04	Bridgeport Sound Tigers	AHL	10	3	6	9	10	—	—	—	—	—
2003–04	New York Islanders	NHL	55	8	12	20	26	5	0	0	0	2
2004–05	Modo Hockey	SEL	50	26	20	46	18	6	0	0	0	4
2005–06	New York Islanders	NHL	53	2	4	6	14	—	—	—	—	—
2005–06	Minnesota Wild	NHL	15	2	3	5	10	—	—	—	—	—
2006–07	Minnesota Wild	NHL	12	1	1	2	10	—	—	—	—	—
2006–07	Houston Aeros	AHL	48	18	27	45	20	—	—	—	—	—
2007–08	Linköpings HC	SEL	54	35	27	62	69	16	7	10	17	8
2008–09	Dynamo Moscow	KHL	41	16	16	32	53	12	6	10	16	4
2009–10	Dynamo Moscow	KHL	56	26	34	60	36	4	1	0	1	2
2010–11	SKA St. Petersburg	KHL	54	21	28	49	42	11	5	4	9	16
2011–12	SKA St. Petersburg	KHL	45	13	23	36	30	13	2	2	4	14
2012–13	Linköpings HC	SEL	30	9	7	16	14	8	0	1	1	2
SEL totals			264	119	95	214	131	63	17	28	45	32
KHL totals			196	76	103	179	136	40	14	16	30	36
NHL totals			182	19	37	56	70	5	0	0	0	2

=== International ===
Year	Team	Event	GP	G	A	Pts	PIM
1998	Sweden	EJC	6	2	1	3	4
1999	Sweden	WJC	6	0	3	3	2
2002	Sweden	WC	9	3	4	7	4
2005	Sweden	WC	8	0	1	1	0
2008	Sweden	WC	9	5	8	13	2
2009	Sweden	WC	9	5	7	12	8
2010	Sweden	OLY	4	0	2	2	2
2010	Sweden	WC	2	3	0	3	0
Junior totals			12	2	4	6	6
Senior totals			41	16	22	38	16
