= Henrik Tallinder =

Swedish ice hockey player (born 1979)

- Tallinder in November 2009
- Born: 10 January 1979 (age 47) Stockholm, Sweden
- Height: 6 ft 4 in (193 cm)
- Weight: 215 lb (98 kg; 15 st 5 lb)
- Position: Defence
- Shot: Left
- Played for: AIK IF; HC TPS; Buffalo Sabres; Linköpings HC; SC Bern; New Jersey Devils; ZSC Lions
- National team: Sweden
- NHL draft: 48th overall, 1997; Buffalo Sabres
- Playing career: 1997–2018

Henrik Per Tallinder (born 10 January 1979) is a Swedish former professional ice hockey defenceman who played in the National Hockey League (NHL) with the Buffalo Sabres and New Jersey Devils.

== Playing career ==
Tallinder made his professional debut in his native Sweden with AIK IF in the Elitserien during the 1996–97 season. Showing elite potential, Tallinder was drafted 48th overall by the Buffalo Sabres in the 1997 NHL entry draft.

After signing with the Buffalo Sabres, Tallinder made his North American debut in the 2001–02 season with AHL affiliate, the Rochester Americans. He was recalled in his first season appearing in 2 scoreless games for the Sabres.

Tallinder suffered a broken left arm in game 3 of the Sabres Eastern Conference finals against the Carolina Hurricanes and missed the remainder of the 2006 Stanley Cup Playoffs. At the time of the injury, he was tied for the NHL playoff lead in plus/minus at +14.

During the 10th game of the 2006–07 season, Tallinder broke the same arm during a game against the New York Islanders. During a game against New Jersey on 6 February 2008, he became the first Sabres defenceman to score in a shootout, scoring against Martin Brodeur.

On 1 July 2010, Tallinder signed a four-year, $13.5 million contract with the New Jersey Devils.

On 7 July 2013, Tallinder was traded back to the team that drafted him, the Buffalo Sabres in exchange for Riley Boychuk.

In September 2014, Tallinder would sign a tryout with the Toronto Maple Leafs, however, he suffered an injury in a preseason game against his former team, the Sabres, and was ultimately released without a contract. After playing in four games with the New York Rangers AHL affiliate, the Hartford Wolf Pack, Tallinder signalled the end of his North American career in returning to Europe and agreeing to a contract with the ZSC Lions of the NLA.

On October 9, 2018, Tallinder officially announced his retirement after 22 professional seasons.

== International play ==
Medal record

Men's ice hockey

Representing Sweden

Olympic Games
Silver medal – second place	2014 Sochi	

World Championships
Gold medal – first place	2013 Sweden/Finland	

On 27 December 2009, Tallinder was selected to the Sweden Men's Ice Hockey Olympic team for the February 2010 Winter Olympics in Vancouver, Canada. He later completed in his second Olympics in Sochi, Russia, claiming the silver medal at the 2014 Winter Olympics.

== Personal ==
In 2005, Tallinder, and fellow Swedish hockey players Kristian Huselius and Andreas Lilja were investigated on suspicion of sexual exploitation. In March 2005, all three players were suspended from the Swedish national team for one year, with Huselius and Tallinder being released by Swedish club Linköping. Lilja was not suspended by Swedish club Mora, but decided to take a break for the remainder of the rest of the season.

Initially police had dropped their investigation within two days 11 February 2005 when a 22-year-old woman accused the trio of raping her 9 February, because of a lack of evidence. However, a special prosecutor reopened the case in March, leading to the suspensions. Tallinder and the others were cleared in June of that year.

As of 2015, Tallinder has lived in Turku, Finland. He has two children with his Finnish wife Anna.

== Career statistics ==
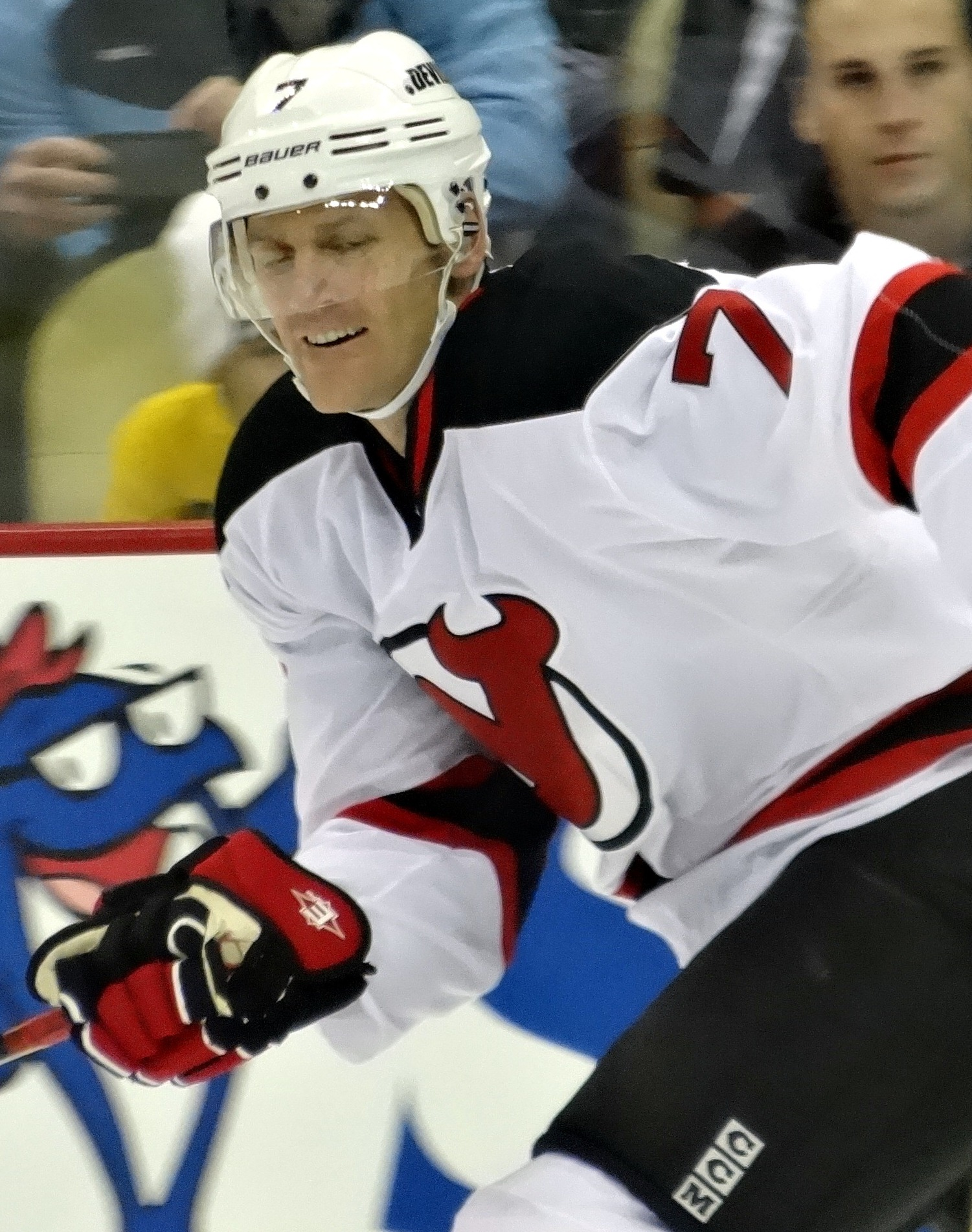
Tallinder during his tenure with the Devils.

=== Regular season and playoffs ===
			Regular season					Playoffs
Season	Team	League	GP	G	A	Pts	PIM	GP	G	A	Pts	PIM
1996–97	AIK	J20	28	2	6	8	—	—	—	—	—	—
1996–97	AIK	SEL	1	0	0	0	0	—	—	—	—	—
1997–98	AIK	SEL	34	0	0	0	53	—	—	—	—	—
1997–98	Piteå HC	SWE.2	6	1	2	3	5	—	—	—	—	—
1998–99	AIK	SEL	35	0	0	0	29	—	—	—	—	—
1999–2000	AIK	SEL	50	0	2	2	59	—	—	—	—	—
2000–01	TPS	SM-l	56	5	9	14	62	10	2	1	3	8
2001–02	Buffalo Sabres	NHL	2	0	0	0	0	—	—	—	—	—
2001–02	Rochester Americans	AHL	73	6	14	20	26	2	0	0	0	0
2002–03	Buffalo Sabres	NHL	46	3	10	13	28	—	—	—	—	—
2003–04	Buffalo Sabres	NHL	72	1	9	10	26	—	—	—	—	—
2004–05	Linköpings HC	SEL	44	6	10	16	63	—	—	—	—	—
2004–05	SC Bern	NLA	—	—	—	—	—	10	1	1	2	4
2005–06	Buffalo Sabres	NHL	82	6	15	21	74	14	2	6	8	16
2006–07	Buffalo Sabres	NHL	47	4	10	14	34	16	0	2	2	10
2007–08	Buffalo Sabres	NHL	71	1	17	18	48	—	—	—	—	—
2008–09	Buffalo Sabres	NHL	66	1	11	12	36	—	—	—	—	—
2009–10	Buffalo Sabres	NHL	82	4	16	20	32	6	0	2	2	2
2010–11	New Jersey Devils	NHL	82	5	11	16	40	—	—	—	—	—
2011–12	New Jersey Devils	NHL	39	0	6	6	16	3	0	0	0	0
2012–13	New Jersey Devils	NHL	25	1	3	4	10	—	—	—	—	—
2013–14	Buffalo Sabres	NHL	64	2	6	8	34	—	—	—	—	—
2014–15	Hartford Wolf Pack	AHL	4	0	1	1	0	—	—	—	—	—
2014–15	ZSC Lions	NLA	16	1	3	4	12	18	0	3	3	24
2015–16	TPS	Liiga	54	5	16	21	115	8	3	1	4	8
2016–17	TPS	Liiga	59	10	19	29	65	6	1	2	3	0
2017–18	TPS	Liiga	46	5	17	22	50	5	0	3	3	16
SEL totals			164	6	12	18	204	—	—	—	—	—
NHL totals			678	28	114	142	378	39	5	10	12	28
SM-l/Liiga totals			215	25	61	86	292	29	6	7	13	32

=== International ===
Year	Team	Event	Result	GP	G	A	Pts	PIM
1997	Sweden	EJC	2nd place, silver medalist(s)	4	0	0	0	0
1998	Sweden	WJC	6th	7	1	0	1	6
1999	Sweden	WJC	4th	3	0	0	0	2
2010	Sweden	OG	5th	4	0	0	0	4
2013	Sweden	WC	1st place, gold medalist(s)	10	1	2	3	18
2014	Sweden	OG	2nd place, silver medalist(s)	3	0	0	0	2
Junior totals				14	1	0	1	8
Senior totals				17	1	2	3	24
