= Martin Plüss =

Swiss ice hockey player

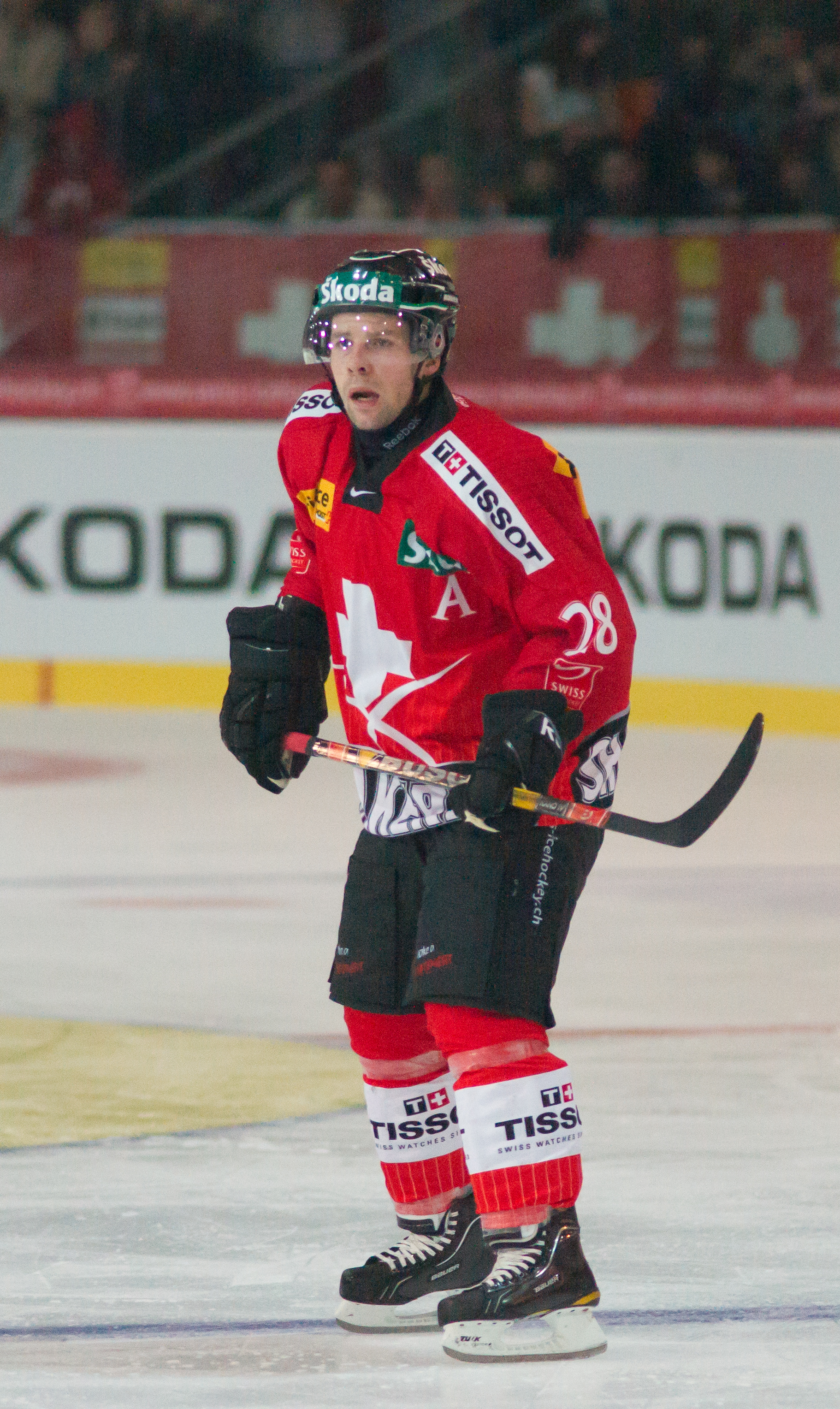
- Born: 5 April 1977 (age 48); Bülach, Switzerland
- Height: 5 ft 9 in (175 cm)
- Weight: 187 lb (85 kg; 13 st 5 lb)
- Position: Centre
- Shot: Left
- Played for: Kloten Flyers; Frölunda HC; SC Bern
- National team: Switzerland
- Playing career: 1994–2017

Martin Plüss (born 5 April 1977) is a retired Swiss professional ice hockey centre. He participated in four Winter Olympics and twelve World Championships.

== Playing career ==
A product of EV Dielsdorf-Niederhasli, Plüss made his debut for EHC Kloten in the Swiss top-flight NLA in 1994. He won the Swiss championship with Kloten in 1995 and 1996. In the 2000–2001 season, he received All-NLA Most Valuable Player honours.

In 2004, he left Kloten to join Frölunda HC in the Swedish Elite League and helped the team capture the title in his first year. After signing a one-year deal with Frölunda in 2004, he signed another one-year deal to stay with the team for the 2005–06 season. Despite offers from other teams, Plüss signed yet another one-year contract with Frölunda in 2006. Plüss' contract expired once again in the spring of 2007, but he turned down offers from primarily Swiss teams to instead sign for three years with Frölunda.

After a disappointing 2008 season, Plüss canceled the remaining two years of his contract with Frölunda, stating his game had not developed as expected. He then signed a three-year contract with SC Bern to return to the Swiss NLA. With SCB, he won Swiss championship titles in 2010, 2013, 2016 and 2017. He was recognized with NLA MVP distinction in 2013.

On 16 February 2017 it was announced that Plüss would leave SC Bern after a 9-year stint in the capital city for an unknown destination. He announced his retirement on 16 November 2017.

== International play ==
Plüss competed for the Swiss national team in the 2002, 2006, 2010 and 2014 Winter Olympics as well as in twelve World Championships, winning silver in 2013. He won a total of 236 caps for the Swiss men's national team.

== Career statistics ==
=== Regular season and playoffs ===
			Regular season					Playoffs
Season	Team	League	GP	G	A	Pts	PIM	GP	G	A	Pts	PIM
1994–95	EHC Kloten	SUI U20
1994–95	EHC Kloten	NDA	19	0	0	0	2	—	—	—	—	—
1995–96	EHC Kloten	SUI U20
1995–96	EHC Kloten	NDA	16	0	0	0	2	4	0	0	0	0
1995–96	EHC Bülach	SUI.3
1996–97	EHC Kloten	SUI U20	3	6	1	7	2	—	—	—	—	—
1996–97	EHC Kloten	NDA	45	6	5	11	30	4	0	1	1	0
1997–98	EHC Kloten	NDA	40	9	10	19	12	6	0	2	2	10
1998–99	EHC Kloten	NDA	45	11	21	32	32	12	3	1	4	8
1999–2000	EHC Kloten	NLA	39	10	18	28	54	7	2	2	4	0
2000–01	Kloten Flyers	NLA	44	9	26	35	30	5	4	4	8	4
2001–02	Kloten Flyers	NLA	44	23	32	55	30	10	2	7	9	4
2002–03	Kloten Flyers	NLA	44	13	18	31	44	5	2	3	5	0
2003–04	Kloten Flyers	NLA	31	15	23	38	12	—	—	—	—	—
2004–05	Frölunda HC	SEL	46	23	16	39	42	13	1	0	1	8
2005–06	Frölunda HC	SEL	45	10	12	22	36	19	4	4	8	24
2006–07	Frölunda HC	SEL	54	17	33	50	96	—	—	—	—	—
2007–08	Frölunda HC	SEL	50	16	9	25	32	6	2	0	2	4
2008–09	SC Bern	NLA	38	21	22	43	58	6	4	4	8	0
2009–10	SC Bern	NLA	45	15	27	42	18	15	3	10	13	12
2010–11	SC Bern	NLA	47	22	16	38	20	11	6	4	10	24
2011–12	SC Bern	NLA	49	11	18	29	28	17	6	4	10	6
2012–13	SC Bern	NLA	50	18	16	34	26	20	10	6	16	10
2013–14	SC Bern	NLA	45	14	22	36	26	—	—	—	—	—
2014–15	SC Bern	NLA	50	23	22	45	18	11	2	2	4	14
2015–16	SC Bern	NLA	50	16	16	32	18	11	0	5	5	2
2016–17	SC Bern	NLA	50	19	14	33	32	15	2	6	8	24
NDA/NLA totals			791	255	326	581	492	159	46	61	107	118
SEL totals			195	66	70	136	206	36	7	4	11	32

Medal record

Men's Ice hockey

Representing Switzerland

World Championships
Silver medal – second place	2013 Sweden/Finland	

=== International ===
Year	Team	Event	Result	GP	G	A	Pts	PIM
1995	Switzerland	EJC18	5th	5	0	2	2	0
1996	Switzerland	WJC	9th	6	0	0	0	0
1997	Switzerland	WJC	7th	6	3	1	4	4
1998	Switzerland	WC	4th	9	0	1	1	4
1999	Switzerland	WC	8th	6	0	1	1	2
2001	Switzerland	WC	9th	6	3	2	5	0
2002	Switzerland	OG	11th	4	2	0	2	2
2002	Switzerland	WC	10th	6	2	1	3	0
2003	Switzerland	WC	8th	7	5	1	6	2
2004	Switzerland	WC	8th	7	1	1	2	2
2005	Switzerland	WC	8th	7	3	2	5	6
2006	Switzerland	OG	6th	6	0	3	3	8
2006	Switzerland	WC	9th	6	2	3	5	14
2009	Switzerland	WC	9th	6	3	1	4	4
2010	Switzerland	OG	8th	5	0	3	3	0
2010	Switzerland	WC	5th	7	4	2	6	25
2011	Switzerland	WC	9th	6	0	3	3	2
2013	Switzerland	WC	2nd place, silver medalist(s)	10	0	6	6	4
2014	Switzerland	OG	9th	4	1	0	1	0
Junior totals				17	3	3	6	4
Senior totals				102	26	30	56	75
