= 2004–05 Elitserien season =

- League: Elitserien
- Sport: Ice hockey
- Duration: September 20, 2004 – March 1, 2005

Regular season
- League champion: Frölunda HC
- Season MVP: Henrik Lundqvist (Frölunda HC)
- Top scorer: Henrik Zetterberg (Timrå IK)

Playoffs

Finals
- Champions: Frölunda HC
- Runners-up: Färjestads BK

SHL seasons
- ← 2003–04 2005–06 →

The 2004–05 Elitserien season was the 30th season of Elitserien. It started on September 20, 2004, with the regular season ending March 1, 2005. The playoffs of the 81st Swedish Championship ended on April 11, with Frölunda HC taking the championship.

== Regular season ==
=== Final standings ===
GP = Games Played, W = Wins, L = Losses, T = Ties, OTW = Overtime Wins, OTL = Overtime Losses, GF = Goals For, GA = Goals Against, Pts = Points

Elitserien	GP	W	L	T	OTW	OTL	GF	GA	Pts
y-Frölunda HC	50	37	10	3	4	2	180	96	112
x-Linköpings HC	50	32	16	2	2	1	162	110	97
x-Timrå IK	50	30	15	5	4	2	159	118	93
x-Färjestads BK	50	29	14	7	3	1	137	108	92
x-Djurgårdens IF	50	25	22	3	2	2	131	135	78
x-Modo Hockey	50	23	22	5	2	5	143	139	77
x-Luleå HF	50	20	27	3	1	2	152	161	64
x-Södertälje SK	50	20	27	3	4	2	127	144	61
e-Mora IK	50	19	28	3	3	4	151	172	61
e-HV71	50	17	31	2	2	6	123	163	57
r-Brynäs IF	50	14	31	5	2	2	123	182	47
r-Malmö Redhawks	50	12	35	3	2	2	111	171	39

x - clinched playoff spot, y - clinched regular season league title, e - eliminated from playoff contention, r - play in relegation series

=== Scoring leaders ===
GP = Games played; G = Goals; A = Assists; Pts = Points; +/– = Plus/minus; PIM = Penalty minutes

Player	Team	GP	G	A	Pts	+/–	PIM
(Sweden) Henrik Zetterberg	Timrå IK	50	19	31	50	+15	24
(Sweden) Kristian Huselius	Linköpings HC	34	14	35	49	+20	10
(Sweden) Mattias Weinhandl	Modo Hockey	50	26	20	46	+3	18
(Canada) Shawn Horcoff	Mora IK	50	19	27	46	–11	117
(Sweden) Nils Ekman	Djurgårdens IF	44	18	27	45	+2	106
(Canada) Brendan Morrison	Linköpings HC	45	16	28	44	+30	50
(Sweden) Niklas Andersson	Frölunda HC	44	14	27	41	+22	16
(United States) Mike Knuble	Linköpings HC	49	26	13	39	+24	40
(Switzerland) Martin Plüss	Frölunda HC	46	23	16	39	+14	42
(Sweden) Marcus Nilson	Djurgårdens IF	48	17	22	39	+11	110

=== Leading goaltenders ===
GP = Games played; TOI = Time on ice (minutes); GA = Goals against; SO = Shutouts; Sv% = Save percentage; GAA = Goals against average

Player	Team	GP	TOI	GA	SO	Sv%	GAA
(Sweden) Henrik Lundqvist	Frölunda HC	44	2641:51	79	6	.936	1.79
(Finland) Fredrik Norrena	Linköpings HC	43	2521:59	78	5	.935	1.86
(Switzerland) Martin Gerber	Färjestads BK	30	1827:33	58	4	.929	1.90
(Finland) Miikka Kiprusoff	Timrå IK	46	2718:59	97	5	.916	2.14
(Sweden) Björn Bjurling	Djurgårdens IF	24	1441:37	61	1	.913	2.54
(Sweden) Tommy Salo	Modo Hockey	36	2164:53	93	0	.909	2.58
(Slovakia) Rastislav Staňa	Södertälje SK	45	2562:08	116	3	.914	2.72
(Finland) Pasi Nurminen	Malmö Redhawks	30	1755:06	86	3	.900	2.94
(Sweden) Stefan Liv	HV71	40	2404:17	119	2	.893	2.97
(Finland) Tero Leinonen	Mora IK	48	2768:05	148	2	.894	3.21

== Playoffs ==
After the regular season, the standard of 8 teams qualified for the playoffs.

=== Playoff bracket ===
In the first round, the highest remaining seed chose which of the four lowest remaining seeds to be matched against. In each round the higher-seeded team was awarded home ice advantage. Each best-of-seven series followed a 1–1–1–2–1–1 format: the higher-seeded team played at home for games 2 and 4 (plus 5 and 7 if necessary), and the lower-seeded team was at home for game 1, 3 and 6 (if necessary).

Quarterfinals
1	Frölunda HC	4
7	Luleå HF	0
4	Färjestads BK	4
6	Modo Hockey	2
(Pairings are reseeded after the first round)
3	Timrå IK	3
5	Djurgårdens IF	4
2	Linköpings HC	2
8	Södertälje SK	4

Semifinals
1	Frölunda HC	4
5	Djurgårdens IF	1
8	Södertälje SK	0
4	Färjestads BK	4

Finals
1	Frölunda HC	4
4	Färjestads BK	1

==== Playoff scoring leaders ====
GP = Games played; G = Goals; A = Assists; Pts = Points; +/– = Plus/minus; PIM = Penalty minutes

Player	Team	GP	G	A	Pts	+/–	PIM
(Sweden) Daniel Alfredsson	Frölunda HC	14	12	6	18	+13	8
(Sweden) Niklas Andersson	Frölunda HC	14	10	3	13	+10	4
(Finland) Tomi Kallio	Frölunda HC	14	7	6	13	+10	6
(Sweden) Jonas Johnson	Frölunda HC	14	2	10	12	+10	8
(Switzerland) Marcel Jenni	Färjestads BK	15	5	6	11	+3	45
(Sweden) Samuel Påhlsson	Frölunda HC	14	4	7	11	+14	24
(Sweden) Jonas Höglund	Färjestads BK	15	4	7	11	+2	8
(Sweden) Per-Johan Axelsson	Frölunda HC	14	1	10	11	+13	18
(Sweden) Nils Ekman	Djurgårdens IF	12	4	5	9	–3	20
(Sweden) Christian Bäckman	Frölunda HC	14	2	7	9	+17	10

==== Playoff leading goaltenders ====
GP = Games played; TOI = Time on ice (minutes); GA = Goals against; SO = Shutouts; Sv% = Save percentage; GAA = Goals against average

Player	Team	GP	TOI	GA	SO	Sv%	GAA
(Sweden) Henrik Lundqvist	Frölunda HC	14	854:27	15	6	.962	1.05
(Finland) Fredrik Norrena	Linköpings HC	6	383:48	13	0	.921	2.03
(Slovakia) Rastislav Staňa	Södertälje SK	10	605:14	22	1	.920	2.18
(Finland) Miikka Kiprusoff	Timrå IK	6	356:44	13	0	.890	2.19
(Canada) José Théodore	Djurgårdens IF	12	728:02	27	0	.922	2.23

Swedish Champions
2004–05
Frölunda HC
Third Title

== Elitserien awards ==
Le Mat Trophy: Frölunda HC
Guldpucken: Henrik Lundqvist, Frölunda HC
Guldhjälmen: Henrik Lundqvist, Frölunda HC
Honken Trophy: Henrik Lundqvist, Frölunda HC
Håkan Loob Trophy: Mike Knuble, Linköpings HC; Mattias Weinhandl, Modo Hockey
Rookie of the Year: Oscar Steen, Färjestads BK
Guldpipan: Thomas Andersson, Gävle

== NHL lockout players ==
Due to the 2004–05 NHL lockout that ultimately cancelled the entirety of the 2004–05 NHL season, the following then-NHL players represented these Elitserien teams during the season:

Brynäs IF

- Tyler Arnason
- Marc-André Bergeron
- Josef Boumedienne
- Ronald Petrovický
- Chris Phillips
- Kimmo Timonen

Djurgårdens IF

- Dan Boyle
- Mariusz Czerkawski
- Nils Ekman
- Marcus Nilson
- José Théodore
- Daniel Tjärnqvist
- Marty Turco

Frölunda HC

- Daniel Alfredsson
- Per-Johan Axelsson
- Christian Bäckman
- Samuel Påhlsson
- Sami Salo

Färjestads BK

- Christian Berglund
- Zdeno Chára
- Mike Comrie
- Marián Gáborík
- Martin Gerber
- Mike Johnson
- Sheldon Souray

HV71

- Brian Boucher
- Jonathan Cheechoo
- Anders Eriksson
- Manny Malhotra
- Bryan McCabe
- Mathias Tjärnqvist

Linköpings HC

- Kristian Huselius
- Mike Knuble
- Brendan Morrison
- Henrik Tallinder

Luleå HF

- Manny Fernandez
- Tomas Holmström
- Branko Radivojevič
- Steve Staios
- Niclas Wallin
- Justin Williams
- Mattias Öhlund

Malmö Redhawks

- Shawn McEachern
- Brett McLean
- Mark Mowers
- Janne Niinimaa
- Pasi Nurminen
- Richard Park

Modo Hockey

- Adrian Aucoin
- Peter Forsberg
- Dan Hinote
- František Kaberle
- Bryan Muir
- Markus Näslund
- Daniel Sedin
- Henrik Sedin
- Mattias Weinhandl

Mora IK

- Daniel Cleary
- Shawn Horcoff
- Marcel Hossa
- Marián Hossa
- Andreas Lilja
- Ladislav Nagy

Södertälje SK

- Kyle Calder
- Niclas Hävelid
- Olli Jokinen
- Mikael Samuelsson
- Scott Thornton
- Dick Tärnström
- Todd White

Timrå IK

- Aki-Petteri Berg
- Miikka Kiprusoff
- Fredrik Modin
- Henrik Zetterberg

== See also ==
- 2004 in sports
- 2005 in sports
