= Marcus Nilson =

Swedish ice hockey player (born 1978)

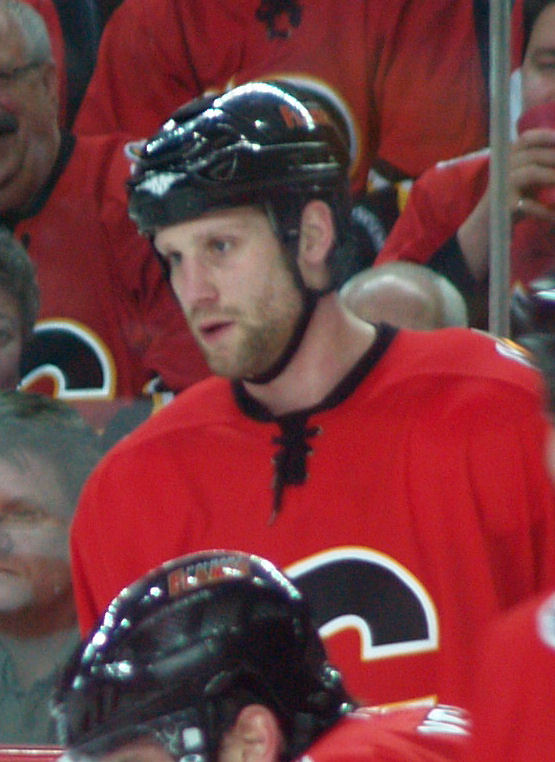
- Born: March 1, 1978 (age 48) Bålsta, Sweden
- Height: 6 ft 2 in (188 cm)
- Weight: 193 lb (88 kg; 13 st 11 lb)
- Position: Left wing
- Shot: Right
- Played for: Djurgårdens IF; Florida Panthers; Calgary Flames; Lokomotiv Yaroslavl; HV71
- National team: Sweden
- NHL draft: 20th overall, 1996; Florida Panthers
- Playing career: 1995–2015

Marcus Rolf Börje Nilson (born March 1, 1978) is a Swedish former professional ice hockey player, who played in the National Hockey League (NHL) with the Florida Panthers and Calgary Flames.

== Playing career ==
Nilson was drafted in the first round, 20th overall, by the Florida Panthers in the 1996 NHL entry draft. His hockey style is quite adverse from the typical style of Swedish hockey players. His grit and intensity, especially among the boards, earned him the role of a dependable checker with the ability to add the odd goal/assist.

A talent of Djurgårdens IF in Sweden, Nilson moved to North America in 1998 and played most of his first two years in the American Hockey League.

After three full seasons with the Panthers, he was traded to the Calgary Flames on March 8, 2004, for a second-round draft pick (used to select David Booth). In his first opportunity to play in the Stanley Cup playoffs, Nilson reached the finals and recorded 11 points in 26 playoffs games. He would play for three more years with Calgary.

In the summer of 2008, the Flames placed Nilson on waivers and after clearing without being claimed by another club, he was loaned to Lokomotiv Yaroslavl of the Kontinental Hockey League (KHL) for the season. Nilson returned to Djurgården for the 2009–10 season, signing a one-year contract. He led his team to the playoffs after scoring 24 goals and 51 points. Nilson kept producing points during the playoffs and Djurgården reached the finals against HV71, which they lost four games to two.

Nilson played with the New Jersey Devils on a try-out contract in September 2010, but was ultimately not offered a contract to play the season.

== Personal ==
Marcus has two children who also played ice hockey. Eric (born 2007) was selected 45th overall in the 2025 NHL entry draft by the Anaheim Ducks. Alice (born 2009) is playing junior hockey in the Brynäs IF system.

== Career statistics ==
=== Regular season and playoffs ===
			Regular season					Playoffs
Season	Team	League	GP	G	A	Pts	PIM	GP	G	A	Pts	PIM
1994–95	Djurgårdens IF	J20	24	7	8	15	22	—	—	—	—	—
1995–96	Djurgårdens IF	J20	25	19	17	36	46	—	—	—	—	—
1995–96	Djurgårdens IF	SEL	12	0	0	0	0	1	0	0	0	0
1996–97	Djurgårdens IF	J20	12	10	8	18	4	—	—	—	—	—
1996–97	Djurgårdens IF	SEL	37	0	3	3	33	4	0	0	0	0
1997–98	Djurgårdens IF	SEL	41	4	7	11	18	15	2	1	3	16
1998–99	Florida Panthers	NHL	8	1	1	2	5	—	—	—	—	—
1998–99	Beast of New Haven	AHL	69	8	25	33	10	—	—	—	—	—
1999–2000	Louisville Panthers	AHL	64	9	23	32	52	4	0	0	0	2
1999–2000	Florida Panthers	NHL	9	0	2	2	2	—	—	—	—	—
2000–01	Florida Panthers	NHL	78	12	24	36	74	—	—	—	—	—
2001–02	Florida Panthers	NHL	81	14	19	33	55	—	—	—	—	—
2002–03	Florida Panthers	NHL	82	15	19	34	31	—	—	—	—	—
2003–04	Florida Panthers	NHL	69	6	13	19	26	—	—	—	—	—
2003–04	Calgary Flames	NHL	14	5	0	5	14	26	4	7	11	12
2004–05	Djurgårdens IF	SEL	48	17	22	39	110	7	1	2	3	10
2005–06	Calgary Flames	NHL	70	6	11	17	32	—	—	—	—	—
2006–07	Calgary Flames	NHL	63	5	10	15	27	6	0	0	0	2
2007–08	Calgary Flames	NHL	47	3	2	5	4	2	0	0	0	0
2008–09	Lokomotiv Yaroslavl	KHL	36	5	3	8	30	15	3	1	4	28
2009–10	Djurgårdens IF	SEL	53	24	27	51	32	16	4	9	13	6
2010–11	Djurgårdens IF	SEL	39	7	16	23	38	7	0	3	3	2
2011–12	Djurgårdens IF	SEL	51	11	21	32	45	—	—	—	—	—
2012–13	HV71	SEL	53	18	16	34	37	5	0	1	1	0
2013–14	HV71	SHL	54	5	12	17	22	2	0	0	0	0
2014–15	HV71	SHL	22	3	2	5	20	—	—	—	—	—
2014–15	Djurgårdens IF	SHL	7	1	2	3	2	—	—	—	—	—
SHL totals			416	90	128	218	357	57	7	16	23	34
NHL totals			521	67	101	168	270	34	4	7	11	14

=== International ===
Year	Team	Event	Result	GP	G	A	Pts	PIM
1995	Sweden	EJC18	3rd place, bronze medalist(s)	5	4	4	8	0
1996	Sweden	EJC18	3rd place, bronze medalist(s)	5	3	5	8	10
1996	Sweden	WJC	2nd place, silver medalist(s)	7	3	5	8	12
1997	Sweden	WJC	8th	6	0	4	4	29
1998	Sweden	WJC	6th	7	3	5	8	4
2003	Sweden	WC	2nd place, silver medalist(s)	1	0	0	0	0
2004	Sweden	WCH	5th	4	1	0	1	4
2008	Sweden	WC	4th	9	4	2	6	2
2009	Sweden	WC	3rd place, bronze medalist(s)	9	3	3	6	6
2010	Sweden	WC	3rd place, bronze medalist(s)	9	1	1	2	2
Junior totals				30	13	23	36	55
Senior totals				32	9	6	15	14

Awards and achievements
Preceded by Radek Dvořák	Florida Panthers first-round draft pick 1996	Succeeded by Mike Brown
