= Alexander Perezhogin =

Kazakh-Russian ice hockey player

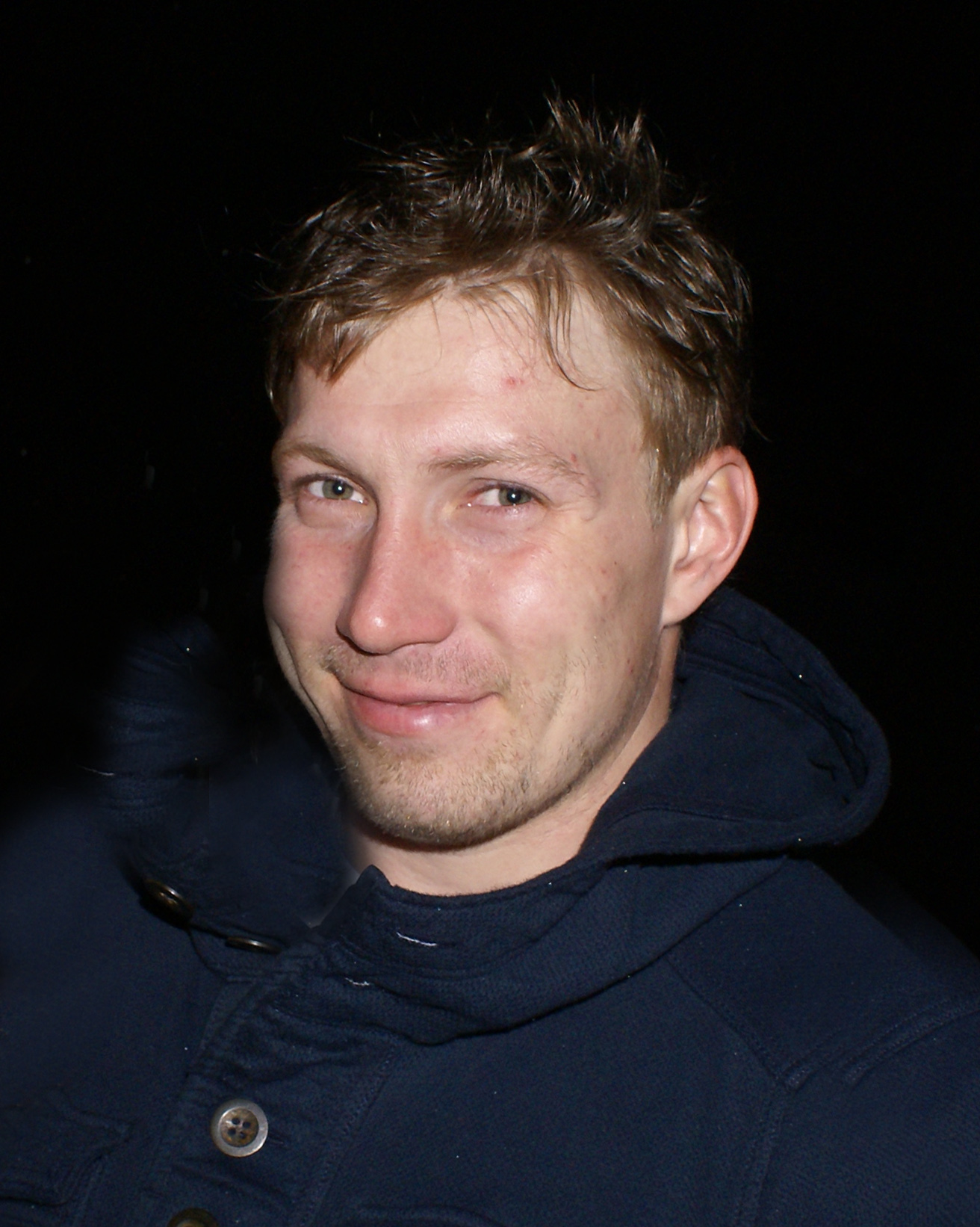
- Perezhogin in 2011
- Born: August 10, 1983 (age 42) Ust-Kamenogorsk, Kazakh SSR, Soviet Union
- Height: 6 ft 0 in (183 cm)
- Weight: 211 lb (96 kg; 15 st 1 lb)
- Position: Right wing
- Shot: Left
- Played for: Avangard Omsk; Montreal Canadiens; Salavat Yulaev Ufa
- National team: Russia
- NHL draft: 25th overall, 2001; Montreal Canadiens
- Playing career: 2000–2019

Alexander Valerievich Perezhogin (Russian: Александр Валерьевич Пережо́гин; born August 10, 1983) is a Kazakhstani–Russian former professional ice hockey player. He was selected in the first round, 25th overall, by the Montreal Canadiens in the 2001 NHL entry draft.

== Playing career ==
Perezhogin began his playing career in his homeland of Kazakhstan before leaving in 1998, with his coach Sergei Gersonsky, to play for Avangard Omsk's farm team Avangard VDV. He would then gain Russian citizenship upon his recruitment. Perezhogin remained with the Omsk organization for the remainder of his Russian league career before being drafted.

Perezhogin was drafted by the Montreal Canadiens in the first round of the 2001 NHL entry draft, 25th overall. In the 2003-04 season, Perezhogin came to North America to play with the Hamilton Bulldogs, Montreal's American Hockey League (AHL) affiliate. He played with the Montreal Canadiens for two seasons.

During Perezhogin's suspension from the AHL for his stick-swinging incident on Garrett Stafford, on the advice of Bob Gainey and the Montreal Canadiens, he re-joined his former team, Avangard Omsk of the Russian Superleague (RSL), and scored 33 points in 43 games. In total, Perezhogin tallied 55 points in 95 games in his career with Avangard.

He scored his first NHL goal on a break-away in his first career game, on October 6, 2005, at Madison Square Garden against New York Rangers goaltender Kevin Weekes.

On May 8, 2007, Perezhogin signed a contract with Salavat Yulayev Ufa of the Russian Superleague. He would earn nearly $1.8 million US, almost three times his NHL salary during the 2006-07 season. The Montreal Canadiens still hold his NHL rights as he is a restricted free agent.

In April 2009, Perezhogin was invited to represent Russia in the 2009 IIHF World Championship hosted in Switzerland, where he played along the sides of Russian NHL superstars such as Ilya Kovalchuk and five of his teammates from Salavat Yulaev Ufa. Russia won its second consecutive gold medal against Canada on May 10, 2009.

In April 2010, Perezhogin was traded to once again join his former team, Avangard Omsk, with Salavat Yulaev Ufa receiving Igor Volkov in return.

== Stick swinging incident ==
On April 30, 2004, during the 2004 Calder Cup playoffs against the Cleveland Barons, Perezhogin was cross-checked in the face by Garrett Stafford, with both players falling to the ice. While both were trying to get back up, Stafford swung his stick at Perezhogin's head making contact with his helmet. In response, while getting up, Perezhogin turned around and swung his stick in an axe-swinging, almost chopping fashion and caught Stafford, who was still getting up, in the face.

The consequent blow knocked Stafford unconscious and into convulsions. Stafford required twenty stitches, lost some teeth, and was diagnosed with a concussion. He was released the next day from Hamilton General Hospital and has since made a full recovery. Perezhogin was suspended for the rest of the playoffs, and in an unprecedented move for the entire following AHL season of 2004–05. Perezhogin was also charged by Hamilton Police Service and was given a one-year probation, ordered to donate $5,000 to charity and to cover all of Stafford's medical bills.

Perezhogin did play pro hockey in 2004–05 but in the Russian Superleague with Avangard. He returned to Hamilton for the 2005–06 season. He was called up to the Montreal Canadiens that season and played 67 games for the Habs. In 2007, however, he returned to Russia, playing for Salavat Yulaev Ufa of the KHL.

== Career statistics ==
=== Regular season and playoffs ===
			Regular season					Playoffs
Season	Team	League	GP	G	A	Pts	PIM	GP	G	A	Pts	PIM
1998–99	Avangard–2 Omsk	RUS.3	10	3	4	7	0	—	—	—	—	—
1999–2000	Avangard Omsk	RSL	1	0	0	0	0	—	—	—	—	—
1999–2000	Avangard–2 Omsk	RUS.3	22	12	11	23	12	—	—	—	—	—
2000–01	Avangard–2 Omsk	RUS.3	42	48	24	72	40	—	—	—	—	—
2000–01	Avangard Omsk	RSL	—	—	—	—	—	1	0	0	0	0
2001–02	Avangard Omsk	RSL	3	1	0	1	4	—	—	—	—	—
2001–02	Mostovik Kurgan	RUS.2	19	14	10	24	10	—	—	—	—	—
2002–03	Avangard Omsk	RSL	48	15	6	21	28	8	0	2	2	4
2003–04	Hamilton Bulldogs	AHL	77	23	27	50	52	5	3	3	6	16
2004–05	Avangard Omsk	RSL	43	15	18	33	18	11	3	2	5	8
2005–06	Hamilton Bulldogs	AHL	11	0	2	2	8	—	—	—	—	—
2005–06	Montreal Canadiens	NHL	67	9	10	19	38	6	1	1	2	4
2006–07	Montreal Canadiens	NHL	61	6	9	15	48	—	—	—	—	—
2007–08	Salavat Yulaev Ufa	RSL	50	21	20	41	42	16	3	2	5	14
2008–09	Salavat Yulaev Ufa	KHL	55	28	24	52	32	4	0	0	0	2
2009–10	Salavat Yulaev Ufa	KHL	56	13	19	32	36	16	4	1	5	22
2010–11	Avangard Omsk	KHL	51	20	17	37	28	11	5	5	10	6
2011–12	Avangard Omsk	KHL	53	17	10	27	28	21	8	4	12	8
2012–13	Avangard Omsk	KHL	45	17	8	25	38	12	1	4	5	10
2013–14	Avangard Omsk	KHL	53	16	20	36	43	—	—	—	—	—
2014–15	Avangard Omsk	KHL	60	17	21	38	34	12	4	3	7	8
2015–16	Avangard Omsk	KHL	56	15	21	36	50	11	5	1	6	6
2016–17	Avangard Omsk	KHL	60	15	13	28	28	9	0	2	2	29
2017–18	Avangard Omsk	KHL	41	4	7	11	47	1	0	0	0	2
2018–19	Avangard Omsk	KHL	16	0	7	7	2	—	—	—	—	—
RSL totals			145	52	44	96	92	36	6	6	12	26
NHL totals			128	15	19	34	86	6	1	1	2	4
KHL totals			546	162	167	329	366	97	27	20	47	93

=== International ===
Year	Team	Event	Result	GP	G	A	Pts	PIM
2001	Russia	WJC18	1st place, gold medalist(s)	6	4	3	7	0
2002	Russia	WJC	1st place, gold medalist(s)	5	0	0	0	4
2003	Russia	WJC	1st place, gold medalist(s)	6	3	6	9	4
2009	Russia	WC	1st place, gold medalist(s)	9	3	3	6	6
2012	Russia	WC	1st place, gold medalist(s)	10	4	5	9	4
2013	Russia	WC	6th	8	1	4	5	2
Junior totals				17	7	9	16	8
Senior totals				27	8	12	20	12

Awards and achievements
Preceded by Mike Komisarek	Montreal Canadiens first-round draft pick 2001	Succeeded by Chris Higgins
