= Kristian Huselius =

Swedish ice hockey player (born 1978)

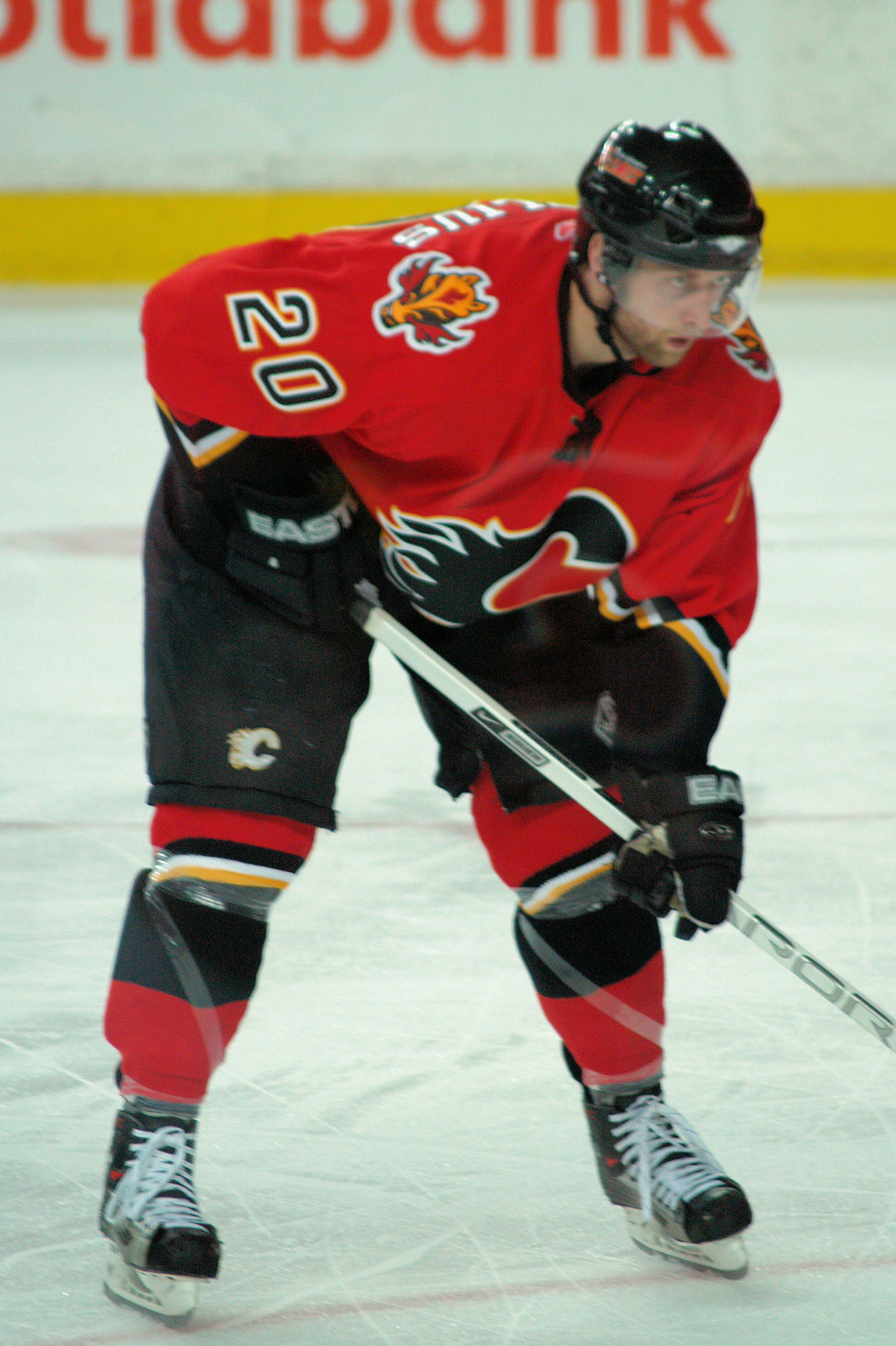
- Huselius with the Calgary Flames in 2007
- Born: 10 November 1978 (age 48) Haninge, Sweden
- Height: 6 ft 1 in (185 cm)
- Weight: 179 lb (81 kg; 12 st 11 lb)
- Position: Left Wing
- Shot: Left
- Played for: Färjestad BK; Frölunda HC; SC Rapperswil-Jona; Florida Panthers; Linköpings HC; Calgary Flames; Columbus Blue Jackets; AIK Hockey
- National team: Sweden
- NHL draft: 47th overall, 1997; Florida Panthers
- Playing career: 1996–2012

Lars Kristian Huselius (born 10 November 1978) is a Swedish former professional ice hockey player.

== Career ==
Huselius' hometown is Haninge, a municipality near Stockholm. He was drafted 47th overall at the 1997 NHL entry draft by the Florida Panthers and entered the National Hockey League (NHL) in 2002. A fast, skillful playmaker, Huselius typically plays on the wings and spent the early part of his career in the Swedish Elitserien, playing for Hammarby IF, Färjestad BK and Frölunda HC. The Panthers traded him to the Calgary Flames on December 2, 2005, where he managed 39 points in 54 games, adjusting well despite fears by some analysts that he would not fit into Calgary's physical, defensive playing style. In the 2006–07 season, he held a point-streak of 15 games, the second-highest in the NHL that season. Huselius also garnered a career-high 77 points that season, scoring 34 goals and adding 43 assists. During the 2007–08 season, Huselius recorded his first career NHL hat-trick against the Tampa Bay Lightning.

On 2 July 2008 Huselius signed a four-year, $19 million contract with the Columbus Blue Jackets. He recorded 21 goals during his first season with the Blue Jackets and also scored a goal during the Blue Jackets' first round playoff loss at the hands of the Detroit Red Wings; it was the Blue Jackets' first-ever appearance in the Stanley Cup playoffs. Huselius played in only 33 games for Columbus after tearing a chest muscle. Following the 2011–12 season, he was released. Huselius stated that the Blue Jackets had rushed his recovery, and that he was not given ample time to recover from his injury. He stated that he was forced into game action too early, which resulted in him pulling his groin muscle and forcing him to miss the rest of the season with a slow recovery. On 8 January 2013, just days after the 2012–13 NHL lockout ended, Huselius announced his retirement from professional hockey due to injury.

=== Suspension due to sex scandal ===
In 2005, Huselius and fellow Swedish hockey players Henrik Tallinder and Andreas Lilja were investigated on suspicion of sexual exploitation. In March 2005, all three players were suspended from the Swedish national team for one year, with Huselius and Tallinder being released by Linköpings HC and Lilja being suspended by Mora IK for the rest of the season.

On 9 February 2005 a 22-year-old woman accused the trio of raping her. Two days later, police dropped their investigation due to a lack of evidence. However, a special prosecutor reopened the case in March, leading to the suspensions. Huselius and the others were cleared in June of that year after a special prosecutor ruled there was no evidence they forced the woman to have sex.

== Awards ==
- NHL All-Rookie Team – 2002

== Career statistics ==
=== Regular season and playoffs ===
			Regular season					Playoffs
Season	Team	League	GP	G	A	Pts	PIM	GP	G	A	Pts	PIM
1994–95	Hammarby IF	J20	17	6	2	8	2	—	—	—	—	—
1995–96	Hammarby IF	SWE U20	25	13	8	21	14	—	—	—	—	—
1995–96	Hammarby IF	SWE.2	6	1	0	1	0	—	—	—	—	—
1996–97	Hammarby IF	J20	15	13	8	21	—	—	—	—	—	—
1996–97	Färjestad BK	SEL	13	2	0	2	4	5	1	0	1	0
1996–97	IFK Munkfors	SWE.2	6	6	2	8	6	—	—	—	—	—
1997–98	Färjestad BK	J20	8	6	8	14	2	—	—	—	—	—
1997–98	Färjestad BK	SEL	34	2	1	3	2	11	0	0	0	0
1997–98	IFK Munkfors	SWE.2	6	6	1	7	4	—	—	—	—	—
1998–99	Färjestad BK	SEL	28	4	4	8	4	—	—	—	—	—
1998–99	Västra Frölunda HC	SWE U20	1	2	1	3	0	—	—	—	—	—
1998–99	Västra Frölunda HC	SEL	10	2	2	4	2	4	1	0	1	0
1999–2000	Västra Frölunda HC	SEL	50	21	23	44	20	5	2	2	4	8
2000–01	Västra Frölunda HC	SEL	49	32	35	67	26	5	4	5	9	14
2001–02	Florida Panthers	NHL	79	23	22	45	14	—	—	—	—	—
2002–03	Florida Panthers	NHL	78	20	23	43	20	—	—	—	—	—
2003–04	Florida Panthers	NHL	76	10	21	31	24	—	—	—	—	—
2004–05	Linköpings HC	SEL	34	14	35	49	10	—	—	—	—	—
2004–05	SC Rapperswil–Jona	NLA	—	—	—	—	—	4	1	3	4	2
2005–06	Florida Panthers	NHL	24	5	3	8	4	—	—	—	—	—
2005–06	Calgary Flames	NHL	54	15	24	39	36	7	2	4	6	4
2006–07	Calgary Flames	NHL	81	34	43	77	26	6	0	2	2	4
2007–08	Calgary Flames	NHL	81	25	41	66	40	7	0	4	4	6
2008–09	Columbus Blue Jackets	NHL	74	21	35	56	44	4	1	1	2	4
2009–10	Columbus Blue Jackets	NHL	74	23	40	63	36	—	—	—	—	—
2010–11	Columbus Blue Jackets	NHL	39	14	9	23	10	—	—	—	—	—
2011–12	Columbus Blue Jackets	NHL	2	0	0	0	2	—	—	—	—	—
2012–13	AIK	SEL	5	2	1	3	0	—	—	—	—	—
SEL totals			233	79	101	180	68	30	8	7	15	22
NHL totals			662	190	261	451	256	24	3	11	14	18

=== International ===
Kristian Huselius
Medal record

Representing Sweden

Ice hockey

World Championships
Bronze medal – third place	2002 Sweden	
Bronze medal – third place	2001 Germany	

Year	Team	Event	GP	G	A	Pts	PIM
1996	Sweden	EJC	5	4	2	6	10
1997	Sweden	WJC	6	1	4	5	4
1998	Sweden	WJC	2	0	0	0	0
2000	Sweden	WC	7	4	1	5	4
2001	Sweden	WC	9	2	3	5	0
2002	Sweden	WC	9	5	6	11	0
2009	Sweden	WC	8	4	3	7	6
Junior totals			13	5	6	11	14
Senior totals			33	15	13	28	10
