= PostFinance Arena =

Ice hockey arena in Bern, Switzerland

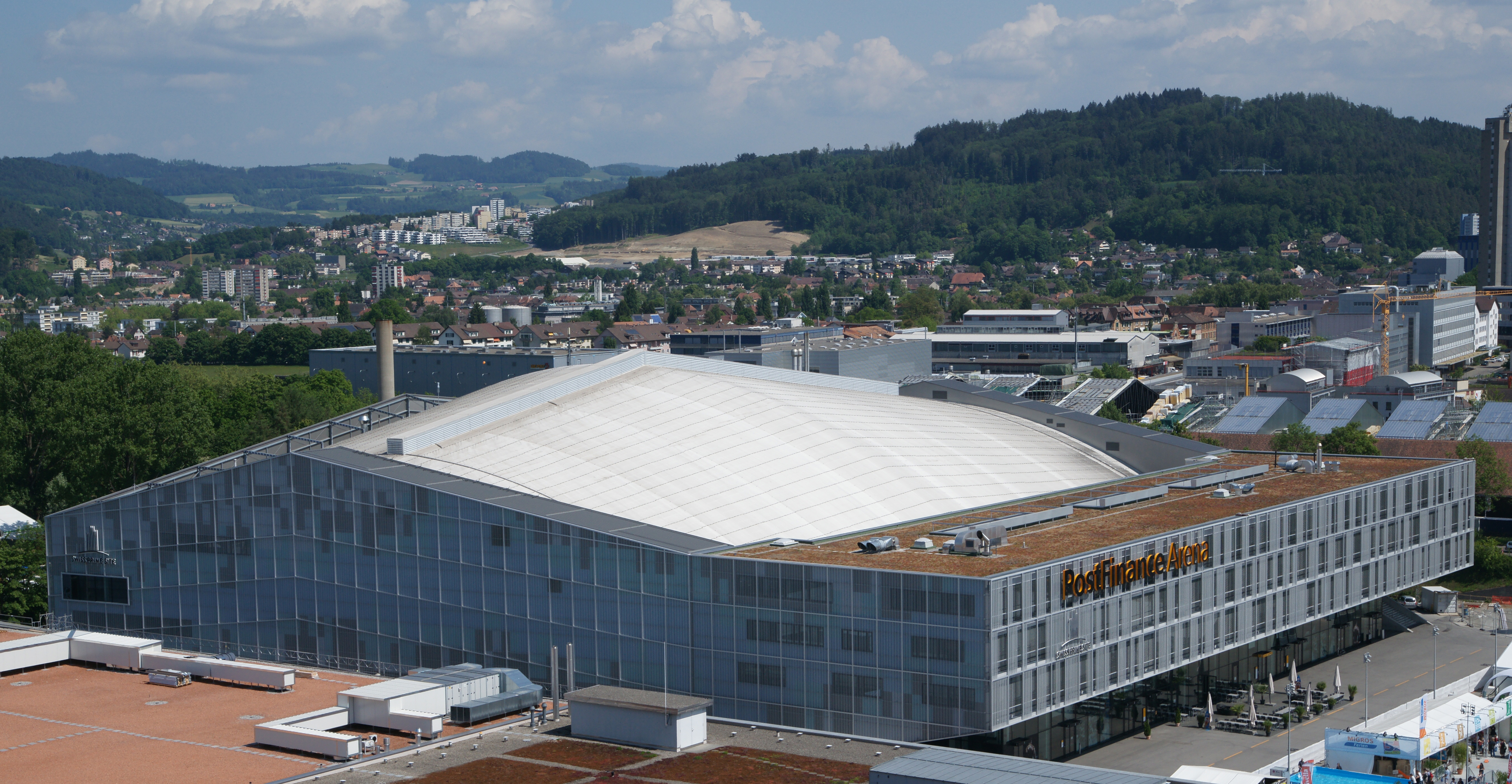
- PostFinance-Arena in May 2011
- Interactive map of PostFinance Arena
- Former names: Eisstadion Allmend (1967–2002); Bern Arena (2002–2007)
- Location: Mingerstrasse 12; 3014 Bern
- Coordinates: 46°57′31″N 7°28′07″E
- Owner: Swiss Prime Site AG
- Capacity: 6,800 seated 10,331 standing room

Construction
- Groundbreaking: 1965
- Opened: 22 October 1967
- Renovated: 1969, 2007–2009

Tenant
- SC Bern (NL) (1967–present)

The PostFinance Arena (originally known as Eisstadion Allmend and Bern Arena) is an indoor arena in Bern, Switzerland. It is primarily used for ice hockey and is the home arena of SC Bern. It was opened in October 1967 and currently accommodates 17,031 people.

== Construction ==
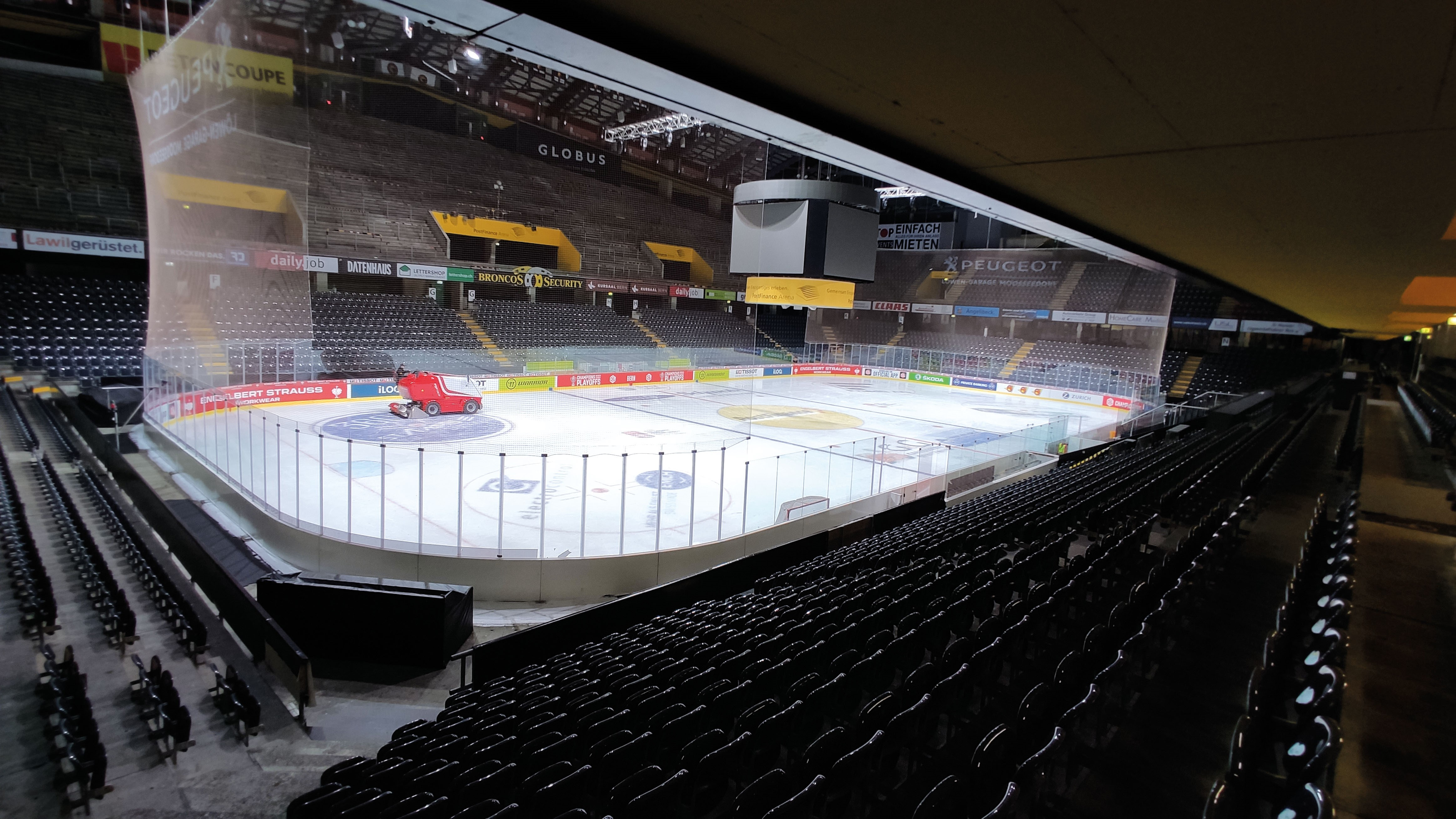
The arena's grandstand (top left) in 2021

A characteristic of the PostFinance Arena is that it has the world's largest general admission grandstand within an arena, with a capacity of 10,422 bench seats. The main roof comprises glulam arches, tied by steel tension members at their springing points. The maximum span of these arches is 85 metres.

== History ==
The PostFinance Arena was the main arena for the 2009 IIHF World Championships, and had already hosted the inaugural Victoria Cup the previous year. Likewise, in May 2016, the 2016 European Women's Artistic Gymnastics Championships were held at the arena.

PostFinance Arena holds a Europe-wide attendance record, having a 16,203 spectator average in the 2008/2009 season.

=== Renovation ===
Due to its age and with an eye towards the 2009 IIHF World Championships, the arena was renovated. The holder invested about CHF 100 million (~$100 million) into the extension and restoration of the building. The modification was finished by April 24, 2009, when the World Championships started.

The interior of the arena is mostly unchanged, especially the steep standing room stand, which is very popular with the fans. By rebuilding the two upper stands behind the goals and redesigning the VIP area, around 1,500 additional seats were created; the capacity in the VIP-zone extended by about 500. The previous VIP zone was demolished and integrated into a new five-storey extension. The extension also houses restaurants and the new media area. The total capacity is now 17,031 spectators. The outer shell was clad with cube-like elements that can be illuminated at night to create an atmospheric effect. In addition, the arena's exterior received a new logo that is clearly visible from several sides.

== See also ==
- List of indoor arenas in Switzerland
- List of European ice hockey arenas
