= Anthoine Lussier =

French ice hockey player

- Position: Forward
- National team: France
- Playing career: 1999–present

Anthoine Lussier (born 8 February 1983 in Bonneville) is a professional French ice hockey player who participated at the 2010 IIHF World Championship as a member of the France National men's ice hockey team.
