= Imre Peterdi =

Hungarian ice hockey player (born 1980)

- Born: 31 May 1980 (age 44); Dunaújváros, Hungary
- Height: 5 ft 10 in (178 cm)
- Weight: 156 lb (71 kg; 11 st 2 lb)
- Caught: Right
- Played for: Dunaújvárosi Acélbikák; Ujpesti TE; Naprzod Janow; Alba Volán Székesfehérvár; Budapest Stars; Ferencvárosi TC
- Playing career: 1998–2016

Imre Peterdi (born 31 May 1980) is a Hungarian former professional ice hockey player.

Peterdi played in the 2009 IIHF World Championship for the Hungary national team.

== Career statistics ==
=== Austrian Hockey League ===
	Seasons	GP	Goals	Assists	Pts	PIM
Regular season	1	43	3	4	7	18
Playoffs	–	–	–	–	–	–
