= Guntis Džeriņš =

Latvian ice hockey player (born 1985)

- Born: February 17, 1985 (age 40) Madona Municipality, Latvian SSR, Soviet Union
- Height: 5 ft 10 in (178 cm)
- Weight: 165 lb (75 kg; 11 st 11 lb)
- Position: Winger
- Shoots: Left
- Played for: Prizma Riga; Vilki Riga; HK Riga 2000; SK Riga 20; MHC Martin
- National team: Latvia
- Playing career: 2001–present

Guntis Džeriņš (born February 17, 1985) is professional Latvian ice-hockey player, who used to play for MHC Martin of Slovak Extraliga. He made his first World championships with team Latvia in 2009. He has younger brother Andris Džeriņš who plays hockey as well.
