= 2006 IIHF World Championship Division I =

Tournament details
- Host countries: France; Estonia
- Venue(s): Amiens Coliséum, Tallinn
- Dates: April 23 – April 30
- Teams: 12 (two groups of 6)

Tournament statistics
- Games played: 30

The 2006 IIHF World Championship Division I was an international Ice hockey tournament run by the International Ice Hockey Federation. The tournament was contested from April 23 to April 30, 2009. Participants in this tournament were separated into two separate tournament groups. The Group A tournament was contested in Amiens, France. Group B's games were played in Tallinn, Estonia. Germany and Austria finished atop of Group A and Group B respectively, gaining promotion to the 2007 World Championship. While Israel finished last in Group A and Croatia last in Group B and were relegated to Division II for 2007.

== Participants ==
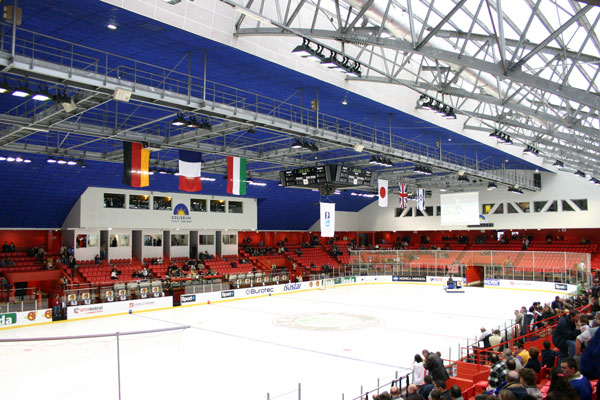
Division 1 Group A in Amiens, France

=== Group A ===
Team	Qualification
Germany	Placed 15th in the World Championship and were relegated in 2005.
France	Placed 2nd in Division I-Group B in 2005.
Hungary	Placed 3rd in Division I-Group A in 2005.
Japan	Placed 4th in Division I-Group A in 2005.
Great Britain	Placed 5th in Division I-Group A in 2005.
Israel	Placed 1st in Division II-Group B and were promoted in 2005.

=== Group B ===
Team	Qualification
Austria	Placed 16th in the World Championship and were relegated in 2005.
Poland	Placed 2nd in Division I-Group A in 2005.
Netherlands	Placed 3rd in Division I-Group B in 2005.
Estonia	Placed 4th in Division I-Group B in 2005.
Lithuania	Placed 5th in Division I-Group B in 2005.
Croatia	Placed 1st in Division II-Group A and were promoted in 2005.

== Group A tournament ==
=== Fixtures ===
All times local.

April 24, 2006; 13:00	Israel	2–11 (0–6, 0–3, 2–2)	Germany	Coliseum; Attendance: 1748

Game reference

Jevgeny Gusin
Boris Amromin
Goalies
Thomas Greiss
Referee:
(Belgium) Sven Bergman

	0 – 1	1:04 – Goc (Sulzer) (PP1)
	0 – 2	4:20 – Boos (Kreutzer, Goc) (PP1)
	0 – 3	5:13 – Bader (Sturm, Hordler)
	0 – 4	7:48 – Gawlik (Gogulla, Schütz)
	0 – 5	11:02 – Gawlik (Bakos, Schütz)
	0 – 6	14:21 – Kreutzer (Ullman, Boos)
	0 – 7	23:03 – Bader (Seidenberg)
	0 – 8	24:16 – Barta (Busch)
	0 – 9	36:30 – Sturm (Seidenberg, Busch) (PP1)
42:44 – O Eizenman (A Eizenman, Bochner)	1 – 9
43:04 – A Eizenman (O Eizenman)	2 – 9
	2 – 10	50:24 – Sturm (Ustorf, Busch)
	2 – 11	51:23 – Fical (Ancicka, Ullman)

18 min
Penalties
4 min
17
Shots
80

April 24, 2006; 16:30	Great Britain	3–4 (0–1, 1–1, 2–2)	Hungary	Coliseum; Attendance: 1373

Game reference

Stephen Murphy
Goalies
Levente Szuper
Referee:
(Slovakia) Rudolf Lauff

	0 – 1	9:47 – Groschl (Ocskay, Palkovics) (PP1)
22:45 – Myers (Cowley) (PP1)	1 – 1
	1 – 2	28:38 – Kovacs (Vas)
	1 – 3	44:44 – Ocskay (Palkovics, Sille
	1 – 4	46:33 – Vas (Ladanyi, Tokaji) (PP1)
56:50 – Phillips (Ellis) (PP2)	2 – 4
57:26 – Shields (Owen)	3 – 4

20 min
Penalties
12 min
26
Shots
27

April 24, 2006; 20:00	Japan	1–4 (0–2, 1–2, 0–0)	France	Coliseum; Attendance: 2600

Game reference

Masahito Haruna
Goalies
Fabrice Lhenry
Referee:
(Canada) Marc Muylaert

	0 – 1	14:52 – Meunier (Coqueux) (PP1)
	0 – 2	18:08 – F. Rozenthal (Bonnard, Bachelet)
24:16 – Saito (Yule) (PP1)	1 – 2
	1 – 3	25:20 – Amar (Coqueux, Meunier) (PP1)
	1 – 4	36:24 – Desrosiers (M. Rozenthal, F. Rozenthal)

16 min
Penalties
22 min
26
Shots
38

April 25, 2006; 16:30	Germany	4–0 (1–0, 1–0, 2–0)	Japan	Coliseum; Attendance: 1221

Game reference

Robert Müller
Goalies
Naoya Kikuchi
Referee:
(Slovakia) Rudolf Lauff

8:55 – Renz (Ustorf)	1 – 0
35:29 – Sturm (Busch) (PP1)	2 – 0
43:18 – Ustorf (Busch, Ancicka)	3 – 0
50:35 – Goc (Ustorf, Sturm) (PP1)	4 – 0

16 min
Penalties
14 min
39
Shots
16

April 25, 2006; 20:00	France	1–0 (0–0, 0–0, 1–0)	Great Britain	Coliseum; Attendance: 2696

Game reference
Fabrice Lhenry	Goalies	Steven Lyle	Referee: (Belgium) Sven Bergman
45:07 – F. Rozenthal (Desrosiers, Amar) (PP1) / 1–0			Referee: (Belgium) Sven Bergman
22 min	Penalties	34 min	Referee: (Belgium) Sven Bergman
37	Shots	26	Referee: (Belgium) Sven Bergman

April 26, 2006; 16:30	Hungary	8–0 (3–0, 3–0, 2–0)	Israel	Coliseum; Attendance: 883

Game reference

Krisztian Budai
Goalies
Jevgeny Gusin
Boris Amromin
Referee:
(Canada) Marc Muylaert

5:12 – Vas (Peterdi) (PP1)	1 – 0
6:40 – Kovacs (Majoross)	2 – 0
13:43 – Vas (Tokaji, Ladanyi)	3 – 0
25:11 – Vas (Peterdi) (SH1)	4 – 0
27:35 – Peterdi (Horvath) (PP1)	5 – 0
34:54 – Szelig (Ocskay) (PP1)	6 – 0
52:33 – Palkovics (Szelig)	7 – 0
55:39 – Groschl (Ocskay, Palkovics) (PP1)	8 – 0

16 min
Penalties
22 min
37
Shots
12

April 27, 2006; 13:00	Israel	1–7 (0–1, 1–3, 0–3)	Japan	Coliseum; Attendance: 1262

Game reference

Jevgeny Gusin
Goalies
Masahito Haruna
Referee:
(Canada) Marc Muylaert

	0 – 1	17:48 – Saito (Kon, Yanadori) (PP1)
	0 – 2	21:15 – Suzuki (Osawa, Ogawa)
	0 – 3	22:13 – Yule (Ogawa, Suzuki)
	0 – 4	22:26 – Nishiwaki (Ueno, Suzuki)
23:04 – A. Eizenman (O. Eizenman, Soreanu)	1 – 4
	1 – 5	53:23 – Keller (Yule, Suzuki) (PP1)
	1 – 6	54:56 – Suzuki (Nishiwaki, Yule) (PP1)
	1 – 7	56:48 – Osawa (Nishiwaki, Obaru)

20 min
Penalties
12 min
7
Shots
59

April 27, 2006; 16:30	Germany	8–0 (4–0, 1–0, 3–0)	Great Britain	Coliseum; Attendance: 2012

Game reference

Robert Müller
Goalies
Stephen Murphy
Steven Lyle
Referee:
(Ukraine) Andriy Sevruk

2:04 – Goc (Sulzer)	1 – 0
9:07 – Gogulla (Schütz)	2 – 0
11:46 – Goc (Ustorf) (PP1)	3 – 0
18:55 – Kreutzer (Bader, Goc) (PP1)	4 – 0
38:54 – Gawlik (Schütz, Sulzer) (PP1)	5 – 0
40:51 – Ullmann (Boos)	6 – 0
46:36 – Schütz (Hordler)	7 – 0
52:52 – Schütz (Gogulla)	8 – 0

18 min
Penalties
38 min
39
Shots
14

April 27, 2006; 20:00	France	3–3 (1–1, 2–1, 0–1)	Hungary	Coliseum; Attendance: 3020

Game reference

Fabrice Lhenry
Goalies
Levente Szuper
Referee:
(Slovakia) Rudolf Lauff

12:10 – F. Rozenthal (PP1)	1 – 0
	1 – 1	18:53 – Ocskay (Palkovics, Sille)
	1 – 2	20:55 – Ladanyi
22:41 – Hecquefeuille (Coqueux)	2 – 2
29:40 – Barin (M. Rozenthal, F. Rozenthal)	3 – 2
	3 – 3	52:18 – Palkovics (Ocskay, Groschl)

0 min
Penalties
4 min
28
Shots
18

April 29, 2006; 13:00	Japan	4–2 (1–2, 1–0, 2–0)	Great Britain	Coliseum; Attendance: 1482

Game reference

Naoya Kikuchi
Goalies
Steven Lyle
Referee:
(Canada) Marc Muylaert

	0 – 1	1:43 – Owen (Ellis, Clarke)
2:48 – Kon (Uchiyama)	1 – 1
	1 – 2	19:17 – Ellis (Owen)
23:03 – Sato (Ito, Domeki) (PP1)	2 – 2
53:59 – Uchiyama (Ito, Miyauchi)	3 – 2
59:58 – Kon (Saito) (PP1)	4 – 2

12 min
Penalties
18 min
43
Shots
19

April 29, 2006; 16:30	France	9–0 (3–0, 2–0, 4–0)	Israel	Coliseum; Attendance: 3048

Game reference

Eddy Ferhi
Goalies
Jevgeny Gusin
Boris Amromin
Referee:
(Slovakia) Rudolf Lauff

3:45 – Coqueux (Barin) (PP1)	1 – 0
11:34 – Hecquefeuille (Coqueux, Lussier)	2 – 0
18:32 – Coqueux (Lussier, Hecquefeuille)	3 – 0
33:18 – Meunier (Coqueux) (PP1)	4 – 0
35:39 – Mortas (Karrer)	5 – 0
43:27 – Hecquefeuille (Coqueux)	6 – 0
44:03 – Tardif (Gras, Bachet)	7 – 0
50:24 – M. Rozenthal (Karrer, Desrosiers) (SH1)	8 – 0
57:10 – Meunier (Gras, Amar) (SH1)	9 – 0

12 min
Penalties
16 min
55
Shots
9

April 29, 2006; 20:00	Hungary	2–6 (1–0, 1–2, 0–4)	Germany	Coliseum; Attendance: 2648

Game reference

Levente Szuper
Goalies
Robert Müller
Referee:
(Belgium) Sven Bergman

8:07 – Janosi (Feil)	1 – 0
	1 – 1	30:54 – Barta (SH1)
35:46 – Groschl (Ocskay, Palkovics)	2 – 1
	2 – 2	38:05 – Boos (Goc, Felski) (PP1)
	2 – 3	45:11 – Felski (Fical, Bakos)
	2 – 4	49:21 – Seidenberg (Goc, Kreutzer) (PP1)
	2 – 5	54:13 – Seidenberg (Hordler, Kreutzer)
	2 – 6	54:47 – Ancicka (Sturm, Ustorf)

12 min
Penalties
8 min
15
Shots
50

April 30, 2006; 13:00	Great Britain	12–0 (2–0, 4–0, 6–0)	Israel	Coliseum; Attendance: 1370

Game reference

Steven Lyle
Goalies
Jevgeny Gusin
Boris Amromin
Referee:
(Belgium) Sven Bergman

6:52 – M. Myers (Clarke, Moody)	1 – 0
14:48 – M. Myers (D. Phillips, Clarke)	2 – 0
25:04 – Ellis (Owen, D. Phillips)	3 – 0
27:16 – Shields (Levers)	4 – 0
30:27 – Shields (Cowley, Weaver)	5 – 0
32:28 – Owen (D. Phillips, Ellis)	6 – 0
41:32 – M. Myers (Clarke, Jamieson)	7 – 0
42:04 – Shields (Cowley, Levers)	8 – 0
48:17 – Cowley (Levers, D. Myers) (PP1)	9 – 0
51:19 – Moran (Sample, D. Myers) (PP1)	10 – 0
52:58 – Clarke (J. Phillips, Thomas)	11 – 0
59:24 – M. Myers (J. Phillips, Clarke)	12 – 0

22 min
Penalties
36 min
46
Shots
13

April 30, 2006; 16:30	Hungary	3–6 (1–1, 1–3, 1–2)	Japan	Coliseum; Attendance: 1340

Game reference

Krisztian Budai
Levente Szuper
Goalies
Naoya Kikuchi
Referee:
(Ukraine) Andriy Sevruk

5:10 – Kovacs (Ladanyi)	1 – 0
	1 – 1	9:30 – Ueno (Ito) (PP1)
27:12 – Palkovics (Ocskay) (PP1)	2 – 1
	2 – 2	30:39 – Ogawa (Yule, Suzuki)
	2 – 3	34:22 – Obara (Ito, Ueno)
	2 – 4	39:17 – Saito (Uchiyama)
	2 – 5	44:28 – Yule (Suzuki) (PP1)
	2 – 6	48:41 – Sato (Iimura) (SH1)
54:21 – Vas (Peterdi, Tokaji)	3 – 6

12 min
Penalties
12 min
23
Shots
28

April 30, 2006; 20:00	Germany	5–0 (2–0, 3–0, 0–0)	France	Coliseum; Attendance: 3200

Game reference

Robert Müller
Goalies
Frabrice Lhenry
Referee:
(Canada) Marc Muylaert

9:37 – Goc (Kruetzer) (PP1)	1 – 0
11:42 – Goc (Gogulla)	2 – 0
27:13 – Ancicka (Schütz)	3 – 0
33:21 – Barta (Fical)	4 – 0
36:42 – Sturm (Bader, Goc)	5 – 0

12 min
Penalties
10 min
29
Shots
29

=== Ranking and statistics ===
Promoted to Championship division for 2007
Relegated to Division II for 2007

Team	GP	W	T	L	GF	GA	GDF	PTS
Germany	5	5	0	0	34	4	30	10
France	5	3	1	1	17	9	8	7
Japan	5	3	0	2	18	14	4	6
Hungary	5	2	1	2	20	18	2	5
Great Britain	5	1	0	4	17	17	0	2
Israel	5	0	0	5	3	47	−44	0

GP = Games played; G = Goals; T = Ties; L = Losses; GF = Goals for; GA = Goals against; GDF = Goal difference; PTS = Points
Source: IIHF.com

==== Scoring leaders ====
List shows the top skaters sorted by points, then goals. If the list exceeds 10 skaters because of a tie in points, all of the tied skaters are left out.

Player	GP	G	A	Pts	+/−	PIM	POS
(Germany) Sascha Goc	5	6	5	11	+3	2	D
(Hungary) Krisztián Palkovics	5	3	8	8	0	2	F
(France) Olivier Coqueux	5	2	6	8	+3	0	F
(Hungary) Gábor Ocskay	5	2	6	8	+1	4	F
(Germany) Marco Sturm	5	4	3	7	+4	6	F
(Germany) Felix Schutz	5	2	5	7	+5	0	F
(Japan) Takahito Suzuki	5	2	5	7	+3	6	F

GP = Games played; G = Goals; A = Assists; Pts = Points; +/− = Plus/minus; PIM = Penalties in minutes; POS = Position
Source: IIHF.com

==== Leading goaltenders ====
Only the top five goaltenders, based on save percentage, who have played 40% of their team's minutes are included in this list.

Player	TOI	SA	GA	GAA	Sv%	SO
(Germany) Robert Müller	239:08	74	2	0.50	97.30	3
(United Kingdom) Steven Lyle	217:41	122	9	2.48	92.62	1
(France) Fabrice Lhenry	240:00	99	9	2.25	90.91	1
(Japan) Naoya Kikuchi	180:00	81	9	3.00	88.89	0
(Japan) Masahito Haruna	120:00	45	5	2.50	88.89	0

TOI = Time On Ice (minutes:seconds); SA = Shots against; GA = Goals against; GAA = Goals against average; Sv% = Save percentage; SO = Shutouts
Source: IIHF.com

== Group B tournament ==
=== Fixtures ===
All times local.

April 23, 2006; 13:00	Lithuania	3–3 (2–0, 0–1, 1–2)	Netherlands	Tallinn; Attendance: 250

Game reference

Arunas Aleinikovas
Goalies
Philip Groeneveld
Referee:
(United Kingdom) Moray Hanson

3:24 – Lelenas (D. Bauba, Katulis) (PP1)	1 – 0
10:29 – Vaiciukevicius (Andrius Kaminskas)	2 – 0
	2 – 1	34:09 – de Wit (SH1)
55:39 – E. Bauba (Bernatavicius)	3 – 1
	3 – 2	58:44 – Polet (Livingston, de Wit)
	3 – 3	59:32 – Hartogs (Kars, van Schagen)

16 min
Penalties
16 min
33
Shots
40

April 23, 2006; 16:30	Estonia	1–3 (0–2, 1–1, 0–0)	Poland	Tallinn; Attendance: 1049

Game reference

Aleksei Terentjev
Goalies
Rafal Radziszewski
Referee:
(Germany) Thomas Schurr

	0 – 1	1:57 – Czerkawski (Laszkiewicz, Slabon) (PP1)
	0 – 2	17:55 – Kolusz (Sokol, Piotrowski)
22:25 – Kozlov (Ivanov, Petrov) (PP1)	1 – 2
	1 – 3	39:59 – Garbocz (Rozanski, Podlipni)

16 min
Penalties
14 min
26
Shots
41

April 23, 2006; 20:00	Croatia	0–6 (0–1, 0–4, 0–1)	Austria	Tallinn; Attendance: 312

Game reference

Vanja Belic
Goalies
Reinhard Divis
Referee:
(Slovenia) Viki Trilar

0 – 1	0:56 – Welser (Setzinger, Lukas)
0 – 2	21:33 – Trattnig (A. Lakos, Kalt) (PP1)
0 – 3	33:11 – Koch
0 – 4	33:15 – Koch (Setzinger)
0 – 5	35:15 – Szücs (Kaspitz, Peintner)
0 – 6	56:57 – Peintner (SH1)

28 min
Penalties
6 min
13
Shots
52

April 24, 2006; 13:00	Poland	1–2 (1–0, 0–0, 0–2)	Lithuania	Tallinn; Attendance: 242

Game reference

Rafal Radziszewski
Goalies
Arunas Aleinikovas
Referee:
(Czech Republic) Turcan Tomas

12:36 – Rozanski (Podlipni) (PP1)	1 – 0
	1 – 1	45:19 – Pliskauskas (Kumeliauskas, Aliukonas) (PP1)
	1 – 2	51:24 – Katulis (Aliukonis, Pliskauskas) (PP1)

12 min
Penalties
18 min
43
Shots
20

April 24, 2006; 16:30	Netherlands	5–1 (1–0, 2–0, 2–1)	Croatia	Tallinn; Attendance: 277

Game reference

Philip Groeneveld
Goalies
Vanja Belic
Referee:
(Germany) Thomas Schurr

19:42 – Teunissen (Euverman, Schagen)	1 – 0
25:40 – Teunissen (Euverman, Schagen)	2 – 0
34:28 – Hoogsteen (Kars, Livingston) (PP1)	3 – 0
	3 – 1	47:08 – Svigir
48:01 – Kars (de Wit, Polet)	4 – 1
59:49 – Polet	5 – 1

6 min
Penalties
22 min
56
Shots
33

April 24, 2006; 20:00	Austria	3–1 (0–1, 2–0, 1–0)	Estonia	Tallinn; Attendance: 2500

Game reference

Reinhard Divis
Goalies
Aleksei Terentjev
Referee:
(United Kingdom) Moray Hanson

	0 – 1	15:26 – Potsinok (Valiullin, Raskidajev) (PP1)
23:59 – Selmser (Rebek, Setzinger) (PP1)	1 – 1
39:54 – Stewart (P. Lakos)	2 – 1
59:44 – Selmser (Stewart)	3 – 1

10 min
Penalties
20 min
50
Shots
17

April 26, 2006; 13:00	Austria	5–3 (1–1, 2–2, 2–0)	Lithuania	Tallinn; Attendance: 224

Game reference

Reinhard Divis
Goalies
Nerijus Dauksevicius
Referee:
(Germany) Thomas Schurr

	0 – 1	16:04 – Katulis (SH2)
19:32 – Kaspitz (Szücs)	1 – 1
	1 – 2	22:03 – Lelenas (Pliskauskas, Katulis)
28:35 – Rebek (Trattnig, Koch) (PP1)	2 – 2
	2 – 3	31:57 – Pliskauskas (Bernatavicius, Katulis)
35:28 – Trattnig (Pewal, Ulrich) (PP1)	3 – 3
45:14 – Welser (Ulrich, Koch) (PP1)	4 – 3
59:18 – Koch (Setzinger) (PP1)	5 – 3

8 min
Penalties
45 min
64
Shots
23

April 26, 2006; 16:30	Poland	5–1 (2–0, 1–0, 2–1)	Netherlands	Tallinn; Attendance: 202

Game reference

Rafal Radziszewski
Goalies
Phillip Groeneveld
Referee:
(Slovenia) Viki Trilar

8:04 – Garbocz (Borzecki, Czerkawski) (PP2)	1 – 0
17:23 – Sarnik (Laszkiewicz, Gonera) (PP1)	2 – 0
20:42 – Czerkawski (Kolusz, Borezecki)	3 – 0
	3 – 1	50:16 – Hartogs (Livingston, de Wit)
50:58 – Piekarski (Kolusz, Czerkawski)	4 – 1
51:59 – Czerkawski (Kolusz, Duleba)	5 – 1

14 min
Penalties
18 min
46
Shots
25

April 26, 2006; 20:00	Croatia	6–8 (2–3, 2–4, 2–1)	Estonia	Tallinn; Attendance: 3000

Game reference

Vanja Belic
Nenad Skrapec
Goalies
Aleksei Terentjev
Andrei Sestakov
Referee:
(Czech Republic) Tomas Turcan

	0 – 1	1:14 – Titarenko (Sildre)
4:53 – Mladjenovic (Ciganovic)	1 – 1
	1 – 2	5:22 – Petrov (Potsinok) (PP1)
	1 – 3	8:08 – Titarenko (Sildre)
9:17 – Belic (PP1)	2 – 3
	2 – 4	21:14 – Palu (Sildre, Titarenko)
	2 – 5	21:53 – Kozlov (Potsinok, Kolpakov) (PP1)
	2 – 6	22:51 – Valiullin (Agnevtstsikov) (PP1)
25:28 – Plahutar (Svigir)	3 – 6
29:05 – Glavota (Ciganovic)	4 – 6
	4 – 7	31:31 – Titarenko (Sildre)
	4 – 8	49:09 – Valiullin (Smirnov, Agnevtstsikov) (PP1)
50:08 – Chovanec (Brumercik, Mladjenovic) (PP2)	5 – 8
59:29 – Jacmenjak (Chovanec, Lovrencic) (PP1)	6 – 8

39 min
Penalties
43 min
27
Shots
40

April 28, 2006; 13:00	Poland	7–1 (1–0, 2–1, 4–0)	Croatia	Tallinn; Attendance: 350

Game reference

Tomasz Wawrzkiewicz
Goalies
Nenad Skrapec
Referee:
(Germany) Thomas Schurr

19:58 – Borzecki (Piekarski, Czerkawski) (PP1)	1 – 0
23:13 – Kolusz (Piekarski, Garbocz)	2 – 0
31:19 – Laszkiewicz (Sarnik)	3 – 0
	3 – 1	33:21 – Grozaj (Zibret, Chovanec)
46:16 – Sarnik (Laszkiewicz, Klys)	4 – 1
47:53 – Garbocz (Kolusz, Borzecki) (PP1)	5 – 1
54:41 – Lopuski (Piotrokski) (PP1)	6 – 1
59:42 – Sarnik (Slabon, Gonera)	7 – 1

10 min
Penalties
12 min
64
Shots
12

April 28, 2006; 16:30	Netherlands	2–8 (1–2, 1–3, 0–3)	Austria	Tallinn; Attendance: 493

Game reference

Phillip Groeneveld
Casper Swart
Goalies
Gert Prohaska
Referee:
(Czech Republic) Tomas Turcan

	0 – 1	2:27 – Pewal (Kalt, A. Lakos) (PP1)
	0 – 2	3:20 – Reichel (Peinter, Kaspitz)
5:33 – de Wit (Livingston, Kars)	1 – 2
	1 – 3	22:27 – Szucs (Kaspitz)
	1 – 4	34:38 – Selmser (Rebek, Koch) (PP1)
	1 – 5	35:44 – Trattnig (Kalt, Pewal) (PP1)
39:14 – Livingston (Hartogs)	2 – 5
	2 – 6	48:17 – Setzinger (Rebek, Koch)
	2 – 7	56:05 – P. Lakos (Trattnig, Kalt) (SH1)
	2 – 8	56:17 – Trattnig (Kalt) (SH1)

18 min
Penalties
18 min
26
Shots
38

April 28, 2006; 20:00	Estonia	2–7 (0–4, 1–2, 1–1)	Lithuania	Tallinn; Attendance: 2500

Game reference

Andrei Sestakov
Aleksei Terentjev
Goalies
Arunas Aleinikovas
Nerijus Dauksevicius
Referee:
(United Kingdom) Moray Hanson

	0 – 1	5:43 – D. Bauba (Aliukonis, Kuliesius)
	0 – 2	8:22 – Lelenas (Pliskauskas, E. Bauba) (PP1)
	0 – 3	13:27 – Pliskauskas (Bernatavicius, D. Bauba)
	0 – 4	18:20 – Pliskauskas (E. Bauba, Lelenas)
25:44 – Valiullin (Ivanov, Kozlov) (PP1)	1 – 4
	1 – 5	35:28 – Kulevicius (Slikas, Vyniauskas)
	1 – 6	36:00 – Lelanas (E. Bauba, Pliskauskas)
45:24 – Palu (Sildre)	2 – 6
	2 – 7	52:27 – Slikas (Kieras, D. Bauba)

37 min
Penalties
16 min
38
Shots
25

April 29, 2006; 13:00	Austria	5–3 (3–1, 0–1, 2–1)	Poland	Tallinn; Attendance: 1100

Game reference

Reinhard Divis
Goalies
Rafal Radziszewski
Tomasz Wawrzkiewicz
Referee:
(Czech Republic) Tomas Turcan

1:54 – Koch (Welser)	1 – 0
7:20 – Rebek (Koch)	2 – 0
	2 – 1	8:10 – Baginski (Kolusz, Borzecki) (SH1)
8:54 – A. Lakos (Pewal, Trattnig) (PP1)	3 – 1
	3 – 2	22:07 – Gonera
54:56 – Welser (Lukas)	4 – 2
	4 – 3	58:09 – Piekarski (Borzecki, Czerkawski) (PP1)
58:51 – Koch (Welser)	5 – 3

14 min
Penalties
14 min
33
Shots
33

April 29, 2006; 16:30	Lithuania	9–3 (5–2, 1–0, 3–1)	Croatia	Tallinn; Attendance: 300

Game reference

Nerijus Dauksevicius
Goalies
Nenad Skrapec
Vanja Belic
Referee:
(United Kingdom) Moray Hanson

	0 – 1	1:12 – Grozaj (Chovanec)
5:38 – Kuliesius (D. Bauba)	1 – 1
7:00 – Bernatavicius (Kuliesius, Bauba)	2 – 1
9:27 – Pliskauskas (Katulis, E.Bauba) (PP2)	3 – 1
	3 – 2	13:13 – Zibret (Belic)
14:57 – Lelenas (E. Bauba, Katulis) (PP1)	4 – 2
16:18 – Katulis (Pliskauskas, Aliukonis) (PP1)	5 – 2
28:33 – Kuliesius (Bernatavicius, Kaminskas)	6 – 2
42:20 – Lelenas (Aliukonis)	7 – 2
	7 – 3	47:39 – Kucera (Iveziq)
56:08 – Lelenas (Pliskauskas, E. Bauba)	8 – 3
59:44 – Bernatavicius (D. Bauba, Kieras) (SH1)	9 – 3

22 min
Penalties
16 min
48
Shots
27

April 29, 2006; 20:00	Netherlands	2–7 (0–2, 0–1, 2–4)	Estonia	Tallinn; Attendance: 3807

Game reference

Phillip Groeneveld
Goalies
Andrei Sestakov
Referee:
(Slovenia) Viki Trilar

	0 – 1	11:02 – Valiullin (Kolpakov) (PP2)
	0 – 2	13:47 – Ivanov (Lahesalu) (SH1)
	0 – 3	35:51 – Kozlov
	0 – 4	40:28 – Petrov (Makrov)
	0 – 5	52:37 – Raskidajev (Makrov, Agnevtstsikov) (PP1)
53:22 – Livingston (de Wit)	1 – 5
54:57 – Schagen (Hoogsteen, Euverman) (PP1)	2 – 5
	2 – 6	56:51 – Makrov (Potsinok, Raskidajev)
	2 – 7	58:48 – Ivanov (Potsinok)

66 min
Penalties
35 min
21
Shots
36

=== Ranking and statistics ===
Promoted to Championship division for 2007
Relegated to Division II for 2007

Team	GP	W	T	L	GF	GA	GDF	PTS
Austria	5	5	0	0	27	9	18	10
Lithuania	5	3	1	1	24	14	10	7
Poland	5	3	0	2	19	10	9	6
Estonia	5	2	0	3	19	21	−2	4
Netherlands	5	1	1	3	13	24	−11	3
Croatia	5	0	0	5	11	35	−24	0

GP = Games played; G = Goals; T = Ties; L = Losses; GF = Goals for; GA = Goals against; GDF = Goal difference; PTS = Points
Source: IIHF.com

==== Scoring leaders ====
List shows the top skaters sorted by points, then goals. If the list exceeds 10 skaters because of a tie in points, all of the tied skaters are left out.

Player	GP	G	A	Pts	+/−	PIM	POS
(Lithuania) Darius Pliskauskas	5	5	7	12	+4	4	F
(Austria) Thomas Koch	5	5	5	10	+6	2	F
(Lithuania) Darius Lelanas	5	7	1	8	+3	2	F
(Lithuania) Arturas Katulis	5	3	5	8	+7	0	D
(Austria) Matthias Trattnig	5	4	3	7	+1	8	F
(Poland) Mariusz Czerkawski	5	3	4	7	+3	2	F
(Poland) Marcin Kolusz	5	2	5	7	+6	4	F
(Lithuania) Dainius Bauba	5	1	6	7	+2	10	F
(Lithuania) Egidijus Bauba	5	1	6	7	+4	31	F

GP = Games played; G = Goals; A = Assists; Pts = Points; +/− = Plus/minus; PIM = Penalties in minutes; POS = Position
Source: IIHF.com

==== Leading goaltenders ====
Only the top five goaltenders, based on save percentage, who have played 40% of their team's minutes are included in this list.

Player	TOI	SA	GA	GAA	Sv%	SO
(Lithuania) Arunas Aleinikovas	228:47	177	11	2.88	93.79	0
(Austria) Reinhard Divis	240:00	86	7	1.75	91.86	1
(Poland) Rafal Radziszewski	188:39	76	7	2.23	90.79	0
(Estonia) Aleksei Terentjev	235:42	138	13	3.31	90.58	0
(Netherlands) Phillip Groeneveld	274:49	173	21	4.58	87.86	0

TOI = Time On Ice (minutes:seconds); SA = Shots against; GA = Goals against; GAA = Goals against average; Sv% = Save percentage; SO = Shutouts
Source: IIHF.com
