= Florian Busch =

German professional ice hockey forward

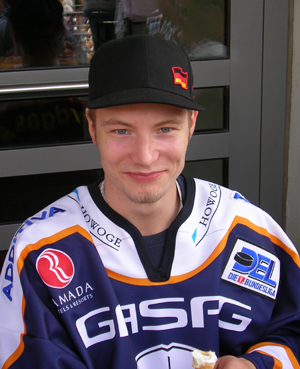
- Born: 2 January 1985 (age 41) Tegernsee, West Germany
- Height: 6 ft 1 in (185 cm)
- Weight: 180 lb (82 kg; 12 st 12 lb)
- Position: Left wing
- Shot: Left
- DEL team: Eisbären Berlin
- National team: Germany
- Playing career: 2002–2021

Florian Busch (born 2 January 1985 in Tegernsee, West Germany) is a German former professional ice hockey forward who last played for Eisbären Berlin of the Deutsche Eishockey Liga (DEL).

== International career ==
Busch has represented Germany at various levels from 2002 to 2008. On 23 June 2009, Busch was banned for two years by the Court of Arbitration for Sport after refusing a drug test in March 2008 because he was spending time with his girlfriend when the testers visited him. He told the testers to come back several hours later, upon which he passed the test. Initially, the German Ice Hockey Federation simply fined Busch for refusing the test- allowing him to play in the 2008 World Championships- but the World Anti-Doping Agency challenged the ruling. Busch's ban was lifted in November 2009, and he signed an anti-doping pledge in December 2009.

== Career statistics ==
=== Regular season and playoffs ===
			Regular season					Playoffs
Season	Team	League	GP	G	A	Pts	PIM	GP	G	A	Pts	PIM
2000–01	Jungadler Mannheim	DEU U18	7	3	3	6	14	—	—	—	—	—
2000–01	Starbulls Rosenheim	DEU U18	21	11	16	27	44	—	—	—	—	—
2001–02	Starbulls Rosenheim	DEU U18	34	29	29	58	95	1	0	0	0	27
2001–02	Starbulls Rosenheim	DEU.5	2	1	0	1	6	—	—	—	—	—
2002–03	Eisbären Berlin	DEL	11	0	1	1	0	—	—	—	—	—
2002–03	EHC Klostersee	DEU.3	25	11	3	14	84	3	0	0	0	0
2003–04	Eisbären Berlin	DEL	47	1	12	13	22	11	0	4	4	2
2003–04	Eisbären Juniors Berlin	DEU.4	4	5	5	10	4	7	5	3	8	20
2004–05	Eisbären Berlin	DEL	38	0	6	6	18	10	1	2	3	2
2004–05	Eisbären Juniors Berlin	DEU.3	11	12	7	19	30	—	—	—	—	—
2005–06	Eisbären Berlin	DEL	47	9	11	20	34	11	0	6	6	6
2005–06	Eisbären Juniors Berlin	DEU.3	3	0	0	0	0	—	—	—	—	—
2006–07	Eisbären Berlin	DEL	26	9	9	18	38	3	0	0	0	0
2007–08	Eisbären Berlin	DEL	54	14	27	41	26	14	6	5	11	4
2008–09	Eisbären Berlin	DEL	39	15	22	37	14	12	1	7	8	4
2009–10	Eisbären Berlin	DEL	42	11	23	34	26	5	1	1	2	2
2010–11	Eisbären Berlin	DEL	49	16	31	47	56	12	5	2	7	6
2011–12	Eisbären Berlin	DEL	46	9	29	38	30	12	3	10	13	2
2012–13	Eisbären Berlin	DEL	45	11	27	38	12	11	1	5	6	2
2013–14	Eisbären Berlin	DEL	35	5	15	20	10	3	1	0	1	2
2014–15	Eisbären Berlin	DEL	33	7	14	21	12	—	—	—	—	—
2015–16	Eisbären Berlin	DEL	43	10	16	26	26	6	2	2	4	2
2016–17	Eisbären Berlin	DEL	42	6	14	20	12	14	1	6	7	6
2017–18	Eisbären Berlin	DEL	29	2	10	12	8	—	—	—	—	—
2018–19	Eisbären Berlin	DEL	42	5	8	13	16	—	—	—	—	—
2019–20	Eisbären Berlin	DEL	1	0	0	0	0	—	—	—	—	—
DEL totals			669	130	275	405	360	124	22	50	72	40

=== International ===
Year	Team	Event	GP	G	A	Pts	PIM
2002	Germany	U17		0	0	0
2003	Germany	WJC18 D1	5	2	3	5	6
2004	Germany	WJC D1	5	0	5	5	4
2005	Germany	WJC	6	1	1	2	14
2006	Germany	OG	5	0	0	0	6
2006	Germany	WC D1	5	0	5	5	4
2007	Germany	WC	6	1	0	1	4
2008	Germany	WC	6	2	3	5	0
Junior totals			16	3	9	12	24
Senior totals			22	3	8	11	14
