= Stefan Ustorf =

German ice hockey player and executive

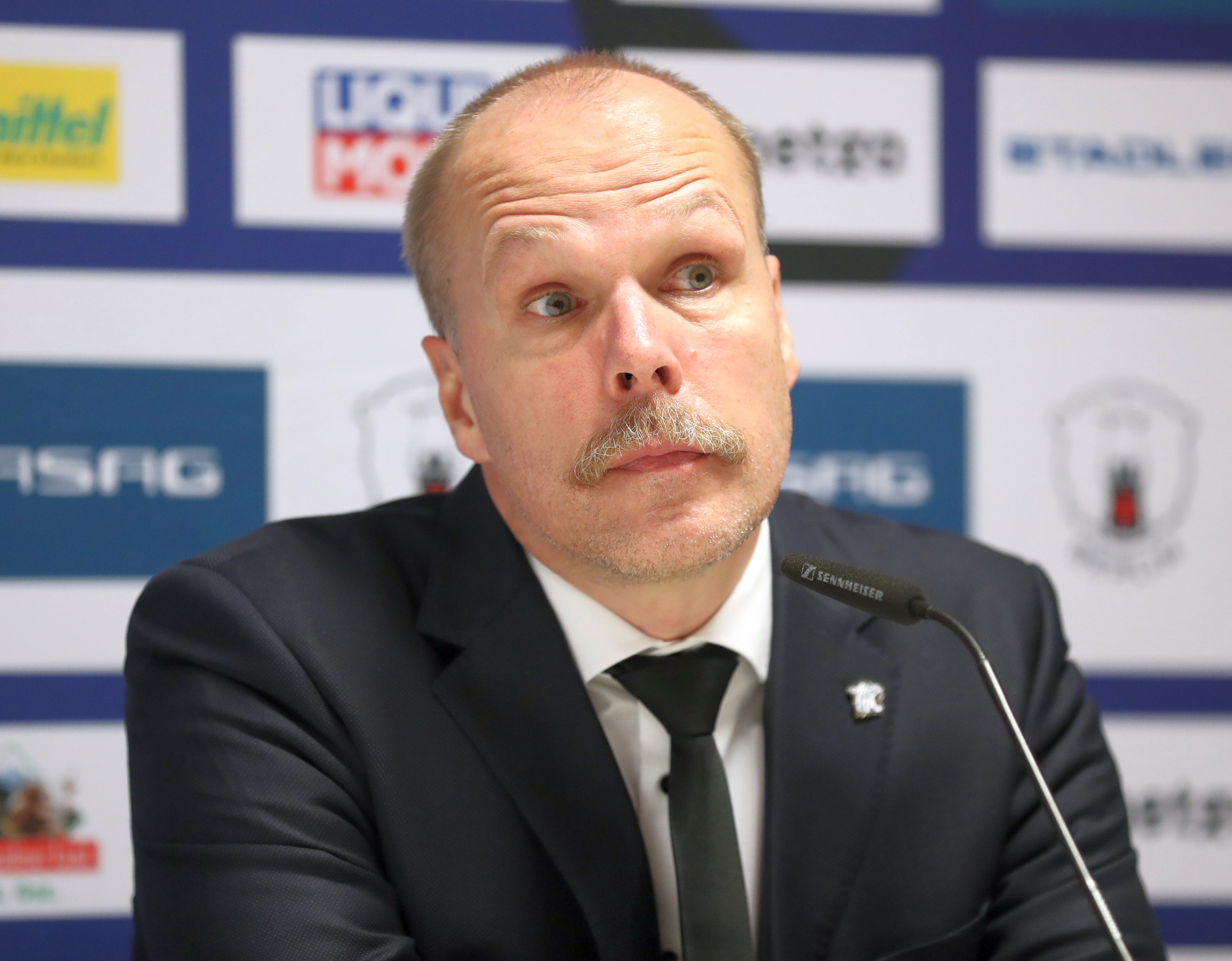
- Born: January 3, 1974 (age 52) Kaufbeuren, West Germany
- Height: 6 ft 1 in (185 cm)
- Weight: 194 lb (88 kg; 13 st 12 lb)
- Position: Left wing
- Shot: Left
- Played for: ESV Kaufbeuren; Washington Capitals; Berlin Capitals; Adler Mannheim; Krefeld Pinguine; Eisbären Berlin
- National team: Germany
- NHL draft: 53rd overall, 1992; Washington Capitals
- Playing career: 1991–2012

Stefan Ustorf (born January 3, 1974) is a German ice hockey executive and a former professional ice hockey player who spent some time with the Washington Capitals in the National Hockey League (NHL) and played predominantly in the Deutsche Eishockey Liga (DEL). He competed in four Olympic Games.

In March 2016, Ustorf was inducted into the German ice hockey Hall of Fame.

== Playing career ==
Ustorf came through the youth ranks of ESV Kaufbeuren and made his debut in the German top-tier during the 1991–92 season.

He played briefly in the National Hockey League (NHL) with the Washington Capitals following his selection in the 1992 NHL entry draft. He made a total of 59 NHL appearances. After a few years in the minors, with stints in the AHL and IHL, he returned to play hockey in Germany.

Ustorf played for DEL teams Adler Mannheim, Krefeld Pinguine and then spent eight years with Eisbären Berlin, winning six German championships.

During the 2011–12 season, his 21st professional season and second year as captain of Eisbären Berlin, he suffered a season ending concussion after 23 games. Whilst still suffering from post-concussion symptoms 14 months later, and other non-related injuries, Ustorf announced his retirement at the tail end of the 2012–13 season on March 7, 2013. On December 28, 2016, he had his jersey number 14 retired by the Eisbären side.

== National team ==
Ustorf played 128 games for the German national team, competed in four Olympic Games (1994, 1998, 2002, 2006), six World Championships and the 1996 World Cup of Hockey.

== Managing career ==
On May 10, 2014, Ustorf was named director of sport at Eisbären Berlin and moved to the role of head of player development in May 2017. He parted ways with the Eisbären organization in December 2019. Prior to that, the club had told him his contract would not be renewed at the conclusion of the 2019–20 season. In March 2021, he was named sporting director of the Nürnberg Ice Tigers.

== Career statistics ==
=== Regular season and playoffs ===
| | | | Regular season | | | | | Playoffs |
| Season | Team | League | GP | G | A | Pts | PIM | GP | G | A | Pts | PIM |
|---|---|---|---|---|---|---|---|---|---|---|---|---|
| 1989–90 | ESV Kaufbeuren | FRG U20 | 8 | 10 | 11 | 21 | 8 | — | — | — | — | — |
| 1990–91 | ESV Kaufbeuren | DEU U20 | 37 | 33 | 34 | 67 | 78 | — | — | — | — | — |
| 1991–92 | ESV Kaufbeuren | 1.GBun | 41 | 2 | 22 | 24 | 46 | — | — | — | — | — |
| 1992–93 | ESV Kaufbeuren | 1.GBun | 37 | 14 | 18 | 32 | 32 | 3 | 1 | 0 | 1 | 10 |
| 1993–94 | ESV Kaufbeuren | 1.GBun | 38 | 10 | 20 | 30 | 21 | 3 | 0 | 0 | 0 | 4 |
| 1994–95 | Portland Pirates | AHL | 63 | 21 | 38 | 59 | 51 | 7 | 1 | 6 | 7 | 7 |
| 1995–96 | Portland Pirates | AHL | 8 | 1 | 4 | 5 | 6 | — | — | — | — | — |
| 1995–96 | Washington Capitals | NHL | 48 | 7 | 10 | 17 | 14 | 5 | 0 | 0 | 0 | 0 |
| 1996–97 | Washington Capitals | NHL | 6 | 0 | 0 | 0 | 2 | — | — | — | — | — |
| 1996–97 | Portland Pirates | AHL | 36 | 7 | 17 | 24 | 27 | — | — | — | — | — |
| 1997–98 | Berlin Capitals | DEL | 45 | 17 | 23 | 40 | 54 | 4 | 1 | 1 | 2 | 4 |
| 1998–99 | Las Vegas Thunder | IHL | 40 | 11 | 17 | 28 | 40 | — | — | — | — | — |
| 1998–99 | Detroit Vipers | IHL | 14 | 3 | 7 | 10 | 11 | 11 | 4 | 7 | 11 | 2 |
| 1999–2000 | Cincinnati Cyclones | IHL | 79 | 20 | 34 | 54 | 53 | 11 | 1 | 4 | 5 | 10 |
| 2000–01 | Cincinnati Cyclones | IHL | 71 | 19 | 38 | 57 | 43 | 5 | 0 | 6 | 6 | 4 |
| 2001–02 | Adler Mannheim | DEL | 58 | 15 | 31 | 46 | 44 | 12 | 2 | 2 | 4 | 10 |
| 2002–03 | Adler Mannheim | DEL | 40 | 13 | 14 | 27 | 70 | 4 | 1 | 1 | 2 | 2 |
| 2003–04 | Adler Mannheim | DEL | 15 | 1 | 9 | 10 | 12 | — | — | — | — | — |
| 2003–04 | Krefeld Pinguine | DEL | 21 | 1 | 9 | 10 | 20 | — | — | — | — | — |
| 2004–05 | Eisbären Berlin | DEL | 51 | 16 | 20 | 36 | 63 | 12 | 2 | 10 | 12 | 0 |
| 2005–06 | Eisbären Berlin | DEL | 49 | 13 | 24 | 37 | 38 | 11 | 2 | 11 | 13 | 6 |
| 2006–07 | Eisbären Berlin | DEL | 41 | 9 | 19 | 28 | 34 | — | — | — | — | — |
| 2007–08 | Eisbären Berlin | DEL | 55 | 20 | 33 | 53 | 67 | 14 | 4 | 3 | 7 | 14 |
| 2008–09 | Eisbären Berlin | DEL | 41 | 7 | 29 | 36 | 46 | 9 | 2 | 5 | 7 | 2 |
| 2009–10 | Eisbären Berlin | DEL | 53 | 13 | 29 | 42 | 80 | 5 | 2 | 2 | 4 | 4 |
| 2010–11 | Eisbären Berlin | DEL | 50 | 13 | 23 | 36 | 47 | 12 | 5 | 13 | 18 | 4 |
| 2011–12 | Eisbären Berlin | DEL | 23 | 3 | 8 | 11 | 6 | — | — | — | — | — |
| NHL totals | | | 54 | 7 | 10 | 17 | 16 | 5 | 0 | 0 | 0 | 0 |
| DEL totals | | | 542 | 141 | 271 | 412 | 581 | 83 | 21 | 48 | 69 | 46 |

=== International ===
| Year | Team | Event | GP | G | A | Pts | PIM |
|---|---|---|---|---|---|---|---|
| 1990 | West Germany | EJC | 6 | 2 | 3 | 5 | 6 |
| 1991 | Germany | WJC B | 7 | 5 | 5 | 10 | 2 |
| 1991 | Germany | EJC | 5 | 3 | 4 | 7 | 4 |
| 1992 | Germany | WJC | 5 | 0 | 2 | 2 | 4 |
| 1992 | Germany | EJC | 6 | 4 | 4 | 8 | 4 |
| 1992 | Germany | WC | 6 | 1 | 1 | 2 | 0 |
| 1993 | Germany | WC | 4 | 1 | 1 | 2 | 26 |
| 1994 | Germany | WJC | 7 | 3 | 1 | 4 | 2 |
| 1994 | Germany | OG | 8 | 1 | 2 | 3 | 2 |
| 1996 | Germany | WCH | 4 | 0 | 2 | 2 | 2 |
| 1998 | Germany | OG | 4 | 0 | 0 | 0 | 0 |
| 2002 | Germany | OG | 7 | 2 | 1 | 3 | 2 |
| 2002 | Germany | WC | 7 | 2 | 3 | 5 | 6 |
| 2004 | Germany | WC | 6 | 1 | 1 | 2 | 0 |
| 2004 | Germany | WCH | 4 | 0 | 0 | 0 | 0 |
| 2006 | Germany | OG | 5 | 0 | 1 | 1 | 0 |
| 2006 | Germany | WC D1 | 5 | 1 | 5 | 6 | 0 |
| 2008 | Germany | WC | 6 | 1 | 2 | 3 | 4 |
| Junior totals | | | 36 | 17 | 19 | 36 | 22 |
| Senior totals | | | 66 | 10 | 19 | 29 | 42 |
