= Tino Boos =

German professional ice hockey player (born 1975)

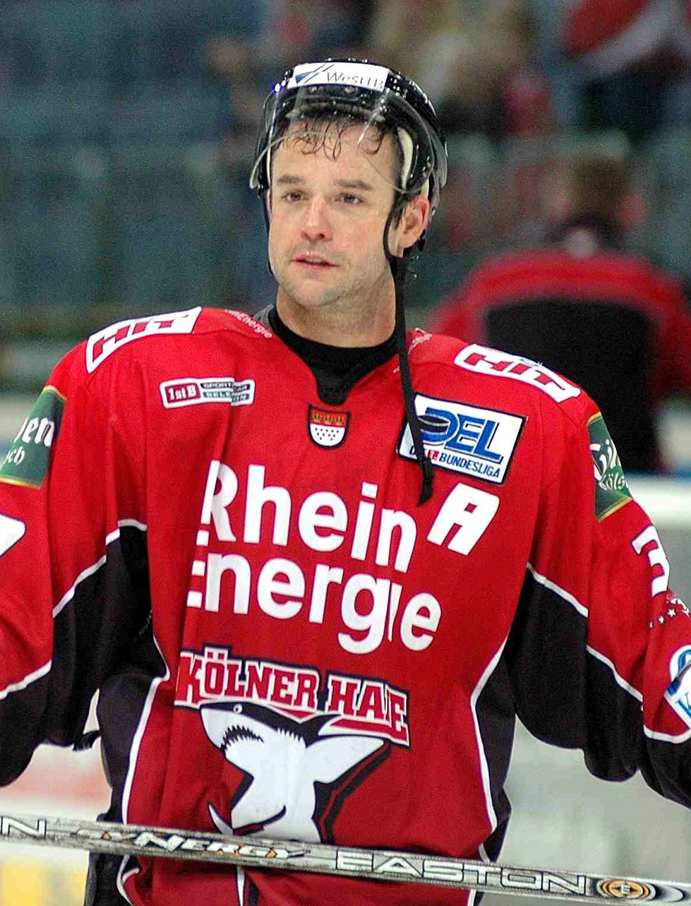
- Born: 10 April 1975 (age 51) Düsseldorf, FRG
- Height: 6 ft 0 in (183 cm)
- Weight: 187 lb (85 kg; 13 st 5 lb)
- Position: Centre
- Shot: Right
- Played for: Düsseldorfer EG; Kassel Huskies; Kölner Haie; Hannover Scorpions
- National team: Germany
- Playing career: 1993–2013

Tino Boos (born 10 April 1975 in Düsseldorf, West Germany) is a former German professional ice hockey player. He last played with the Düsseldorfer EG of the Deutsche Eishockey Liga (DEL).

== Playing career ==
Boos began his career with the Düsseldorfer EG in 1992/93, becoming German champion in the first year. In 1994, he then switched to the Kassel Huskies, because he did not get enough playing time in Düsseldorf. At the 1993 Under-18 European and the 1995 Junior World championship, however, he was one of the most important players for Germany. In 2000, he left Kassel and joined the Kölner Haie in Cologne. He has been the assistant captain for the Sharks since 2000.

Boos after the 06-07 season, was thinking about a move to an NHL team. With a pursuing contract, he looked to sign with the Buffalo Sabres or San Jose Sharks to be with fellow German player Marcel Goc but eventually stayed in Germany and played four seasons from the 07-08 season with the Hannover Scorpions.

== Career statistics ==
=== Regular season and playoffs ===
			Regular season					Playoffs
Season	Team	League	GP	G	A	Pts	PIM	GP	G	A	Pts	PIM
1991–92	Düsseldorfer EG	DEU U20	9	0	1	1	0	—	—	—	—	—
1992–93	Düsseldorfer EG	DEU U20	31	21	15	36	60	—	—	—	—	—
1992–93	Düsseldorfer EG	1.GBun	2	0	0	0	0	—	—	—	—	—
1993–94	Düsseldorfer EG	1.GBun	13	0	2	2	6	3	0	0	0	0
1994–95	Kassel Huskies	DEL	39	2	5	7	10	9	0	1	1	0
1995–96	Kassel Huskies	DEL	35	2	2	4	16	8	1	1	2	6
1996–97	Kassel Huskies	DEL	49	4	7	11	57	9	1	0	1	27
1997–98	Kassel Huskies	DEL	38	4	7	11	64	4	0	1	1	0
1998–99	Kassel Huskies	DEL	52	8	15	23	40	—	—	—	—	—
1999–2000	Kassel Huskies	DEL	40	5	4	9	64	8	2	2	4	4
2000–01	Kölner Haie	DEL	57	9	11	20	16	3	0	0	0	2
2001–02	Kölner Haie	DEL	59	3	13	16	77	12	0	0	0	8
2002–03	Kölner Haie	DEL	50	10	10	20	74	15	3	3	6	8
2003–04	Kölner Haie	DEL	42	13	13	26	26	5	0	0	0	25
2004–05	Kölner Haie	DEL	46	10	25	35	63	6	1	0	1	33
2005–06	Kölner Haie	DEL	48	11	14	25	77	3	0	1	1	31
2006–07	Kölner Haie	DEL	47	6	12	18	125	9	0	2	2	12
2007–08	Hannover Scorpions	DEL	50	15	23	38	66	3	0	2	2	0
2008–09	Hannover Scorpions	DEL	43	9	12	21	67	11	1	3	4	6
2009–10	Hannover Scorpions	DEL	39	3	7	10	44	11	2	4	6	8
2010–11	Hannover Scorpions	DEL	11	1	1	2	4	4	0	0	0	22
2011–12	Kölner Haie	DEL	38	1	2	3	32	6	1	0	1	0
2012–13	Düsseldorfer EG	DEL	2	0	0	0	0	—	—	—	—	—
DEL totals			785	116	183	299	922	126	12	20	32	192

=== International ===
Year	Team	Event	GP	G	A	Pts	PIM
1993	Germany	EJC	6	0	0	0	0
1995	Germany	WJC	7	0	0	0	14
1999	Germany	WC B	7	2	1	3	31
2000	Germany	OGQ	3	4	1	5	0
2000	Germany	WC B	7	2	2	4	4
2001	Germany	OGQ	3	0	0	0	2
2003	Germany	WC	7	1	2	3	2
2004	Germany	WC	6	0	2	2	2
2004	Germany	WCH	4	1	1	2	2
2005	Germany	WC	6	2	0	2	14
2006	Germany	OG	5	2	1	3	8
2006	Germany	WC D1	5	2	2	4	4
Junior totals			13	0	0	0	14
Senior totals			53	16	12	28	69
