= Felix Schütz =

German ice hockey player

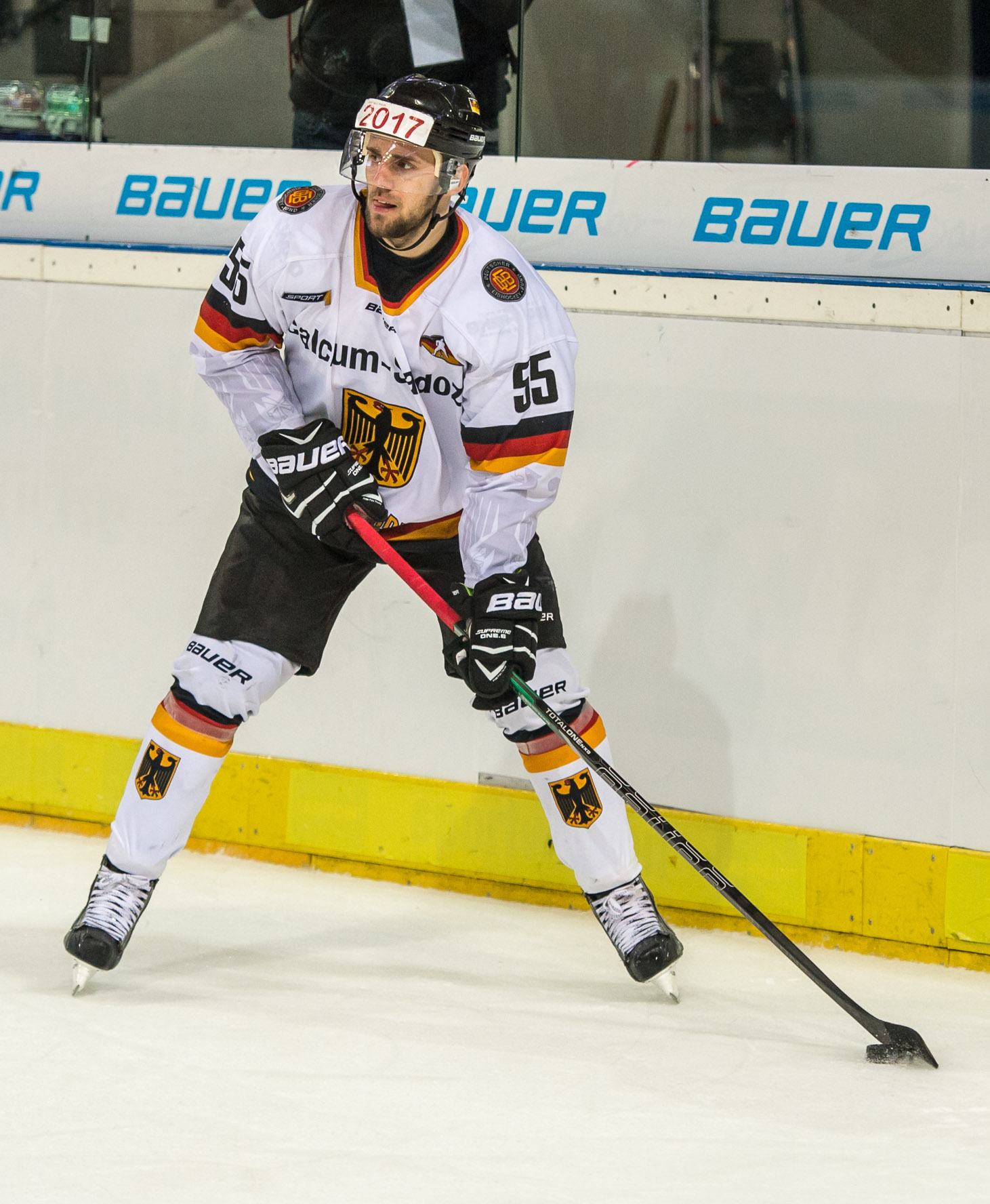
- Born: 3 November 1987 (age 38) Erding, West Germany
- Height: 5 ft 11 in (180 cm)
- Weight: 187 lb (85 kg; 13 st 5 lb)
- Position: Centre
- Shot: Left
- Played for: ERC Ingolstadt; Portland Pirates; Kölner Haie; Admiral Vladivostok; EHC München; Avangard Omsk; Dinamo Riga; Torpedo Nizhny Novgorod; Rögle BK; IK Oskarshamn; Straubing Tigers; Adler Mannheim
- National team: Germany
- NHL draft: 117th overall, 2006; Buffalo Sabres
- Playing career: 2007–2021

Felix Schütz (born 3 November 1987) is a German former professional ice hockey player who played in the Deutsche Eishockey Liga (DEL).

== Playing career ==
Schütz was drafted in the fourth round, 117th overall, by the Buffalo Sabres in the 2006 NHL entry draft. Schütz was drafted from the Saint John Sea Dogs of the Quebec Major Junior Hockey League after making the move to North America from playing in Germany with the Landshut Cannibals.

Upon completing his second season in the QMJHL between the Sea Dogs and Val-d'Or Foreurs in 2006–07, Schütz returned to Germany to play professionally in the Deutsche Eishockey Liga (DEL) with ERC Ingolstadt. Schütz posted an impressive 12 goals and 25 points as a rookie in the 2007–08 to earn a three-year entry-level contract with the Sabres on 7 May 2008.

Schütz spent the next two seasons in the American Hockey League with Sabres affiliate, the Portland Pirates. Despite the possibility of remaining with Pirates for a third consecutive season, Schütz opted to play in Germany and returned to Ingolstadt on a two-year contract on 20 October 2010.

Schütz scored the overtime winning goal for the host country, Germany, against the U.S. in the opening-round of the 2010 IIHF World Championship.

During the 2011-12 season, he transferred to fellow DEL team Kölner Haie, where he played until the end of the 2012-13 campaign, followed by stints in the KHL (Admiral Vladivostok, Avangard Omsk, Dinamo Riga, Torpedo Nizhny Novgorod), at EHC München and in the Swedish Hockey League at Rögle BK.

In July 2017, he signed as a free agent in a return to former German club, Kölner Haie of the DEL.

Following a brief stint in the SHL with IK Oskarshamn, Schütz returned to the DEL during the 2019–20 season with the Straubing Tigers. In the pandemic delayed 2020–21 season, Schütz linked up with original club, EV Landshut, before agreeing to a one-year contract with his fifth top flight club, Adler Mannheim, on 15 December 2020.

== International play ==
Medal record

Representing Germany

Ice hockey

Olympic Games
Silver medal – second place	2018 Pyeongchang	

He was named to the Germany men's national ice hockey team for competition at the 2014 IIHF World Championship.

== Career statistics ==
=== Regular season and playoffs ===
			Regular season					Playoffs
Season	Team	League	GP	G	A	Pts	PIM	GP	G	A	Pts	PIM
2003–04	Jungadler Mannheim	DNL	29	22	20	42	10	—	—	—	—	—
2004–05	Landshut Cannibals	DNL	9	6	8	14	33	2	2	3	5	0
2004–05	Landshut Cannibals	GER.2	24	1	2	3	8	5	0	0	0	2
2005–06	Saint John Sea Dogs	QMJHL	65	21	31	52	61	—	—	—	—	—
2006–07	Saint John Sea Dogs	QMJHL	18	4	7	11	16	—	—	—	—	—
2006–07	Val–d'Or Foreurs	QMJHL	27	15	18	33	28	20	5	10	15	22
2007–08	ERC Ingolstadt	DEL	46	12	13	25	76	3	0	1	1	2
2008–09	Portland Pirates	AHL	78	15	27	42	61	5	1	1	2	2
2009–10	Portland Pirates	AHL	67	13	14	27	61	3	0	0	0	10
2010–11	ERC Ingolstadt	DEL	35	5	7	12	32	4	0	0	0	4
2011–12	ERC Ingolstadt	DEL	9	1	1	2	0	—	—	—	—	—
2011–12	Kölner Haie	DEL	37	10	20	30	34	6	3	2	5	2
2012–13	Kölner Haie	DEL	50	23	18	41	56	12	3	7	10	4
2013–14	Admiral Vladivostok	KHL	54	16	22	38	36	5	2	1	3	8
2014–15	EHC Red Bull München	DEL	9	3	2	5	6	—	—	—	—	—
2014–15	Admiral Vladivostok	KHL	15	3	4	7	16	—	—	—	—	—
2014–15	Avangard Omsk	KHL	12	2	2	4	4	11	1	0	1	25
2015–16	Dinamo Rīga	KHL	11	1	1	2	8	—	—	—	—	—
2015–16	Torpedo Nizhny Novgorod	KHL	12	0	2	2	25	—	—	—	—	—
2015–16	Rögle BK	SHL	11	4	2	6	0	—	—	—	—	—
2016–17	Rögle BK	SHL	50	8	13	21	28	—	—	—	—	—
2017–18	Kölner Haie	DEL	50	18	28	46	30	6	2	3	5	2
2018–19	Kölner Haie	DEL	50	15	19	34	28	7	3	2	5	16
2019–20	IK Oskarshamn	SHL	6	0	2	2	0	—	—	—	—	—
2019–20	Straubing Tigers	DEL	27	7	8	15	16	—	—	—	—	—
2020–21	EV Landshut	GER.2	9	9	10	19	0	—	—	—	—	—
2020–21	Adler Mannheim	DEL	24	3	4	7	14	3	1	0	1	0
DEL totals			337	97	120	217	292	41	12	15	27	30
AHL totals			145	28	41	69	122	8	1	1	2	12
KHL totals			104	22	31	53	89	16	3	1	4	33

=== International ===
Year	Team	Event	GP	G	A	Pts	PIM
2004	Germany	U17	5	0	1	1	0
2005	Germany	WJC18	6	2	1	3	2
2005	Germany	WJC	6	0	0	0	0
2006	Germany	WJC D1	5	1	3	4	8
2006	Germany	WC D1	5	2	5	7	2
2007	Germany	WJC	6	5	3	8	8
2010	Germany	WC	9	2	2	4	4
2011	Germany	WC	7	3	1	4	4
2012	Germany	WC	4	0	1	1	0
2013	Germany	OGQ	3	0	0	0	2
2013	Germany	WC	7	1	0	1	6
2014	Germany	WC	5	0	1	1	2
2016	Germany	WC	7	2	5	7	2
2016	Germany	OGQ	3	4	1	5	2
2017	Germany	WC	8	1	1	2	0
2018	Germany	OG	7	1	2	3	10
Junior totals			28	8	8	16	18
Senior totals			65	16	19	35	34
