= Andreas Renz =

German ice hockey player

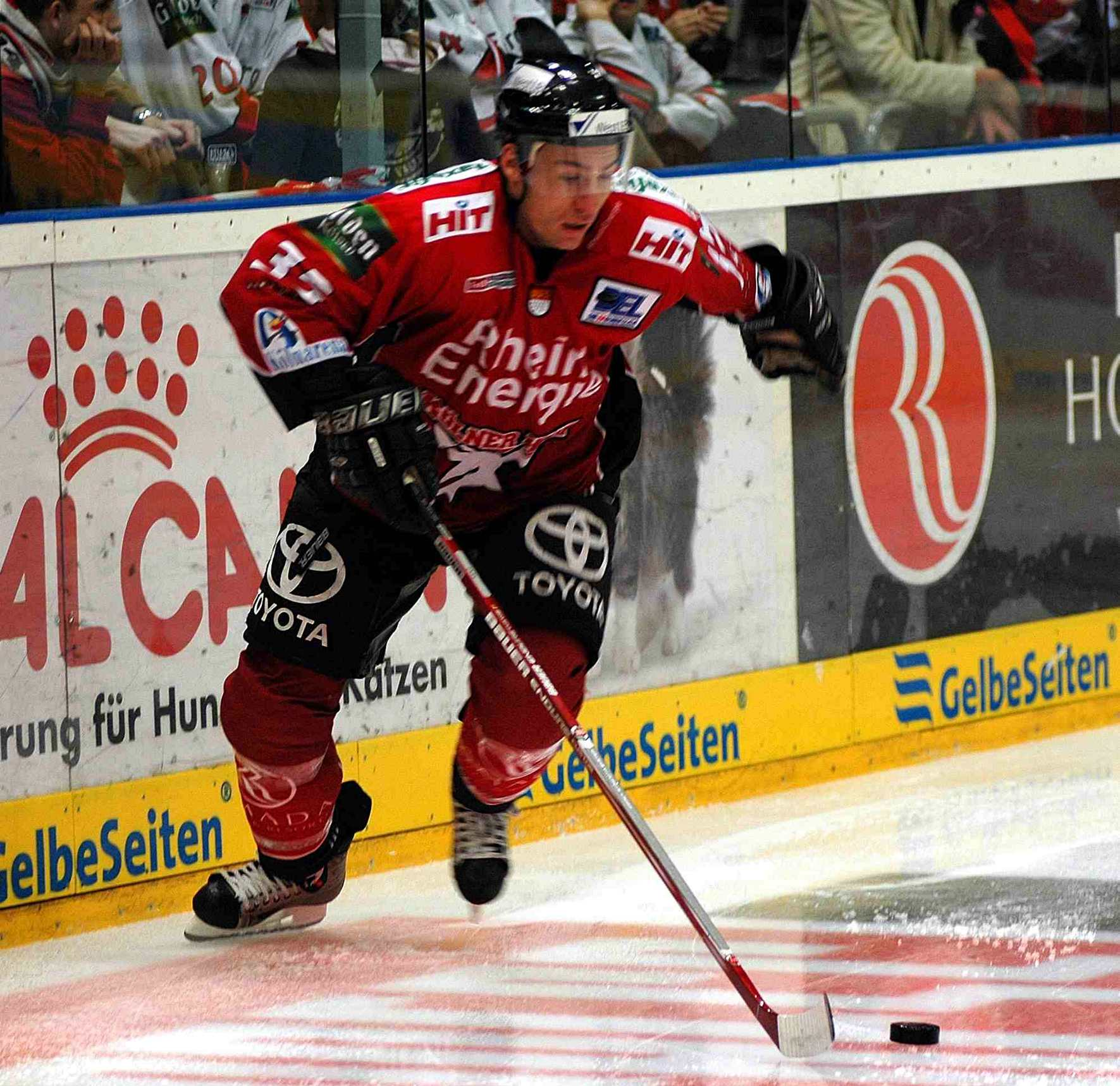
- Born: June 12, 1977 (age 47); Villingen-Schwenningen, Germany
- Height: 6 ft 0 in (183 cm)
- Weight: 207 lb (94 kg; 14 st 11 lb)
- Position: Defense
- Shot: Left
- Played for: SERC Wild Wings; Kölner Haie
- National team: Germany
- NHL draft: Undrafted
- Playing career: 1994–2012

Andreas Renz (born 12 June 1977) is a German ice hockey player. He competed in the men's tournaments at the 2002 Winter Olympics and the 2006 Winter Olympics.

Renz started his career at the Schwenninger ERC. He played as a defender on the youth teams. In 1994 Renz made his debut in the German ice hockey league for the Schwenninger Wild Wings, for which he became a regular player. In 2001, Renz von Schwenningen moved to the DEL Spitzen Club. Following a series of injuries, in summer 2012 he ended his career and became Wild Wings assistant coach.

== Career statistics ==
=== Regular season and playoffs ===
			Regular season					Playoffs
Season	Team	League	GP	G	A	Pts	PIM	GP	G	A	Pts	PIM
1994–95	SERC Wild Wings	DEL	33	0	3	3	16	10	0	0	0	6
1995–96	SERC Wild Wings	DEL	45	1	8	9	22	4	0	0	0	0
1996–97	SERC Wild Wings	DEL	48	0	2	2	28	—	—	—	—	—
1997–98	SERC Wild Wings	DEL	32	1	1	2	14	6	0	2	2	2
1998–99	SERC Wild Wings	DEL	51	3	10	13	50	—	—	—	—	—
1999–00	SERC Wild Wings	DEL	56	2	3	5	71	9	3	0	3	8
2000–01	SERC Wild Wings	DEL	55	1	4	5	80	—	—	—	—	—
2001–02	Kölner Haie	DEL	60	0	2	2	56	13	0	0	0	16
2002–03	Kölner Haie	DEL	51	1	5	6	67	14	0	0	0	22
2003–04	Kölner Haie	DEL	51	0	3	3	80	6	0	0	0	6
2004–05	Kölner Haie	DEL	52	1	3	4	68	7	0	0	0	4
2005–06	Kölner Haie	DEL	49	1	3	4	44	9	0	0	0	26
2006–07	Kölner Haie	DEL	52	0	5	5	72	9	0	1	1	26
2007–08	Kölner Haie	DEL	53	2	7	9	106	13	1	3	4	50
2008–09	Kölner Haie	DEL	51	3	5	8	89	—	—	—	—	—
2009–10	Kölner Haie	DEL	53	1	11	12	71	3	0	0	0	4
2010–11	SERC Wild Wings	DEU.2	34	3	4	7	70	11	0	5	5	12
2011–12	SERC Wild Wings	DEU.2	39	0	2	2	40	11	0	0	0	44
DEL totals			792	17	75	92	934	92	1	6	7	162

=== International ===
Year	Team	Event	GP	G	A	Pts	PIM
1994	Germany	EJC	5	0	0	0	2
1995	Germany	WJC	7	0	0	0	6
1995	Germany	EJC	5	1	0	1	2
1996	Germany	WJC	6	0	1	1	4
1997	Germany	WJC	6	0	0	0	6
1999	Germany	WC B	7	0	0	0	0
2000	Germany	OGQ	3	0	0	0	0
2000	Germany	WC B	7	1	1	2	4
2001	Germany	OGQ	3	0	0	0	0
2001	Germany	WC	7	0	0	0	8
2002	Germany	OG	7	0	0	0	8
2002	Germany	WC	7	0	0	0	6
2003	Germany	WC	7	0	0	0	6
2004	Germany	WC	6	0	1	1	4
2004	Germany	WCH	3	0	0	0	2
2005	Germany	WC	6	0	0	0	2
2006	Germany	OG	5	0	0	0	2
2006	Germany	WC D1	5	1	0	1	0
2008	Germany	WC	6	0	2	2	4
2009	Germany	OGQ	3	0	0	0	2
2009	Germany	WC	6	0	0	0	8
Junior totals			29	1	1	2	20
Senior totals			88	2	4	6	56
