= Sascha Goc =

German ice hockey player (born 1979)

- Born: April 14, 1979 (age 47) Calw, West Germany
- Height: 6 ft 1 in (185 cm)
- Weight: 227 lb (103 kg; 16 st 3 lb)
- Position: Defenceman
- Shot: Right
- Played for: Schwenninger Wild Wings; New Jersey Devils; Tampa Bay Lightning; Adler Mannheim; Hannover Scorpions
- National team: Germany
- NHL draft: 159th overall, 1997; New Jersey Devils
- Playing career: 1996–2017

Sascha Goc (born April 14, 1979) is a German former professional ice hockey who last played for the Schwenninger Wild Wings of the Deutsche Eishockey Liga (DEL). Goc played in the National Hockey League for the New Jersey Devils and the Tampa Bay Lightning. His younger brothers Marcel and Nikolai currently play for Adler Mannheim.

== Playing career ==
As a youth, Goc played in the 1992 and 1993 Quebec International Pee-Wee Hockey Tournaments with a team from Baden-Württemberg.

Goc was drafted 157th overall by the New Jersey Devils in the 1997 NHL entry draft where he played 13 games without scoring a point and collecting four penalty minutes. On November 9, 2001, he was traded by the Devils, along with Josef Boumedienne and Anton Butt to the Tampa Bay Lightning for Andrei Zyuzin. He played in nine games with the Lightning without scoring a point. While in North America he also played in the American Hockey League for the Albany River Rats and the Springfield Falcons. In 2002, he went back to Germany to play for Adler Mannheim and before moving to Hannover, where he scored 17 goals and 13 assists for 30 points in 50 games in 2005–06.

On February 1, 2011, in his sixth season with the Scorpions, Goc signed a further two-year contract extension to remain in Hannover.

After the Scorpions ceased operations in the DEL, Goc returned to his original club, the Schwenninger Wild Wings, who coincidentally bought Hannover's license to return to the DEL on July 18, 2013.

He was a member on the Germany hockey team in the 1998 Winter Olympics in Nagano, Japan and in the 2002 Winter Olympics in Salt Lake City, leading Germany to the quarterfinals before losing to the United States 5–0.

== Career statistics ==
=== Regular season and playoffs ===
			Regular season					Playoffs
Season	Team	League	GP	G	A	Pts	PIM	GP	G	A	Pts	PIM
1994–95	SERC Wild Wings	DEU U20	14	5	1	6	10	—	—	—	—	—
1995–96	SERC Wild Wings	DEU U20	11	3	6	9	77	—	—	—	—	—
1995–96	SERC Wild Wings	DEL	1	0	0	0	0	—	—	—	—	—
1996–97	SERC Wild Wings	DEL	41	3	1	4	26	—	—	—	—	—
1996–97	SERC Wild Wings II	DEU.3	1	1	1	2	2	—	—	—	—	—
1997–98	SERC Wild Wings	DEU U20	4	1	3	4	8	—	—	—	—	—
1997–98	SERC Wild Wings	DEL	41	3	4	7	47	8	2	1	3	2
1998–99	Albany River Rats	AHL	55	1	12	13	24	2	0	0	0	0
1999–2000	Albany River Rats	AHL	64	9	22	31	35	5	2	0	2	6
2000–01	Albany River Rats	AHL	55	10	29	39	49	—	—	—	—	—
2000–01	New Jersey Devils	NHL	11	0	0	0	4	—	—	—	—	—
2001–02	Albany River Rats	AHL	10	0	5	5	12	—	—	—	—	—
2001–02	New Jersey Devils	NHL	2	0	0	0	0	—	—	—	—	—
2001–02	Springfield Falcons	AHL	36	3	9	12	30	—	—	—	—	—
2001–02	Tampa Bay Lightning	NHL	9	0	0	0	0	—	—	—	—	—
2002–03	Adler Mannheim	DEL	49	1	3	4	87	7	1	0	1	41
2003–04	Adler Mannheim	DEL	46	5	12	17	58	3	0	0	0	0
2004–05	Adler Mannheim	DEL	39	1	4	5	67	14	0	0	0	0
2005–06	Hannover Scorpions	DEL	50	17	13	30	164	10	2	4	6	64
2006–07	Hannover Scorpions	DEL	38	20	24	44	107	6	2	2	4	10
2007–08	Hannover Scorpions	DEL	38	9	21	30	90	3	1	0	1	10
2008–09	Hannover Scorpions	DEL	48	24	16	40	108	11	4	10	14	10
2009–10	Hannover Scorpions	DEL	52	17	24	41	72	11	4	5	9	6
2010–11	Hannover Scorpions	DEL	52	23	28	51	70	2	0	0	0	0
2011–12	Hannover Scorpions	DEL	50	8	19	27	34	—	—	—	—	—
2012–13	Hannover Scorpions	DEL	46	6	18	24	66	—	—	—	—	—
2013–14	Schwenniger Wild Wings	DEL	47	4	15	19	24	—	—	—	—	—
2014–15	Schwenniger Wild Wings	DEL	49	8	21	29	42	—	—	—	—	—
2015–16	Schwenniger Wild Wings	DEL	49	2	18	20	74	—	—	—	—	—
2016–17	Schwenniger Wild Wings	DEL	27	1	9	10	12	—	—	—	—	—
DEL totals			763	152	250	402	1148	75	16	22	38	143
AHL totals			210	23	77	100	150	7	2	0	2	6
NHL totals			22	0	0	0	4	—	—	—	—	—

=== International ===
Year	Team	Event	GP	G	A	Pts	PIM
1996	Germany	EJC	5	0	1	1	4
1997	Germany	WJC	6	0	0	0	12
1997	Germany	EJC	4	0	0	0	10
1998	Germany	WJC	6	0	2	2	27
1998	Germany	WC	6	1	2	3	8
2003	Germany	WC	7	0	2	2	6
2004	Germany	WCH	3	0	0	0	2
2006	Germany	OG	5	0	0	0	10
2006	Germany	WC D1	5	6	5	11	2
Junior totals			21	0	3	3	53
Senior totals			26	7	9	16	28
