= Michael Bakos =

German ice hockey player

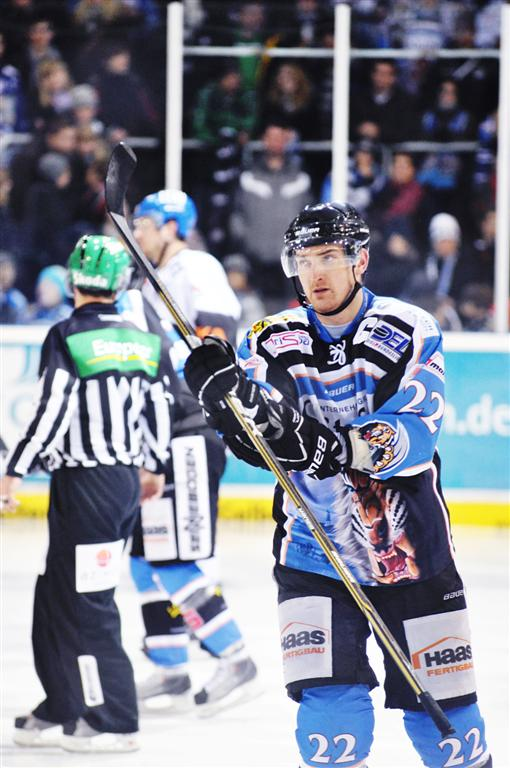
- Born: March 2, 1979 (age 46) Augsburg, West Germany
- Height: 6 ft 3 in (191 cm)
- Weight: 212 lb (96 kg; 15 st 2 lb)
- Position: Defence
- Shot: Right
- DEL team Former teams: Augsburger Panther; Adler Mannheim; ERC Ingolstadt; Straubing Tigers
- National team: Germany
- Playing career: 1996–2014

Michael Bakos (born March 2, 1979, in Augsburg, West Germany) is a German professional ice hockey defenceman for the Augsburger Panther of the Deutsche Eishockey Liga.

== Playing career ==
Bakos began playing professionally in 1996 with the Augsburger Panthers, with whom he played for four seasons until 2000. Beginning with the 2000–01 season, he played with Mannheim Eagles for six years. He joined ERC Ingolstadt in 2006.

During his fourth season with Ingolstadt, on January 2, 2010, it was announced that Bakos signed a two-year-contract with the Straubing Tigers to start in the 2010–11 season.

Bakos returned to the Augsburger Panthers to begin the 2012–13 season.

Bakos was selected to play for the German national team for the 2010 Winter Olympics.

== Career statistics ==
=== Regular season and playoffs ===
			Regular season					Playoffs
Season	Team	League	GP	G	A	Pts	PIM	GP	G	A	Pts	PIM
1994–95	Augsburger Panther	GER U20	13	0	1	1	12	—	—	—	—	—
1995–96	Augsburger Panther	GER U20	11	2	4	6	4	—	—	—	—	—
1996–97	Augsburger Panther	GER U20	27	9	11	20	26	—	—	—	—	—
1996–97	Augsburger Panther	DEL	16	0	0	0	0	—	—	—	—	—
1997–98	Augsburger Panther	DEL	19	1	1	2	0	—	—	—	—	—
1998–99	Augsburger Panther	DEL	33	0	2	2	12	5	0	0	0	2
1999–2000	Augsburger Panther	DEL	43	0	1	1	14	3	0	0	0	0
2000–01	Adler Mannheim	DEL	15	0	2	2	2	9	0	0	0	0
2001–02	Adler Mannheim	DEL	58	2	1	3	14	12	0	0	0	0
2002–03	Adler Mannheim	DEL	50	2	3	5	32	8	0	1	1	2
2003–04	Adler Mannheim	DEL	43	2	4	6	34	6	0	1	1	0
2004–05	Adler Mannheim	DEL	28	1	4	5	26	14	0	0	0	22
2005–06	Adler Mannheim	DEL	48	0	2	2	46	—	—	—	—	—
2006–07	ERC Ingolstadt	DEL	46	0	7	7	56	6	0	0	0	8
2007–08	ERC Ingolstadt	DEL	51	4	10	14	38	—	—	—	—	—
2008–09	ERC Ingolstadt	DEL	38	2	6	8	30	—	—	—	—	—
2009–10	ERC Ingolstadt	DEL	45	1	5	6	36	10	0	0	0	16
2010–11	Straubing Tigers	DEL	34	3	6	9	34	—	—	—	—	—
2011–12	Straubing Tigers	DEL	44	1	12	13	22	8	1	1	2	0
2012–13	Augsburger Panther	DEL	30	0	2	2	12	—	—	—	—	—
2013–14	Augsburger Panther	DEL	7	0	0	0	4	—	—	—	—	—
DEL totals			648	19	68	87	412	81	1	3	4	50

=== International ===
Year	Team	Event	GP	G	A	Pts	PIM
1996	Germany	EJC	5	0	0	0	2
1997	Germany	WJC	6	0	0	0	2
1997	Germany	EJC	6	0	1	1	0
1998	Germany	WJC	6	1	0	1	2
1999	Germany	WJC B	6	1	1	2	4
2005	Germany	WC	5	0	0	0	0
2006	Germany	WC D1	5	0	2	2	0
2007	Germany	WC	5	0	2	2	6
2008	Germany	WC	6	1	1	2	8
2009	Germany	OGQ	3	0	1	1	0
2009	Germany	WC	6	1	1	2	6
2010	Germany	OG	4	0	0	0	0
Junior totals			29	2	2	4	10
Senior totals			34	2	7	9	20
