= Petr Fical =

Czech-born German ice hockey player

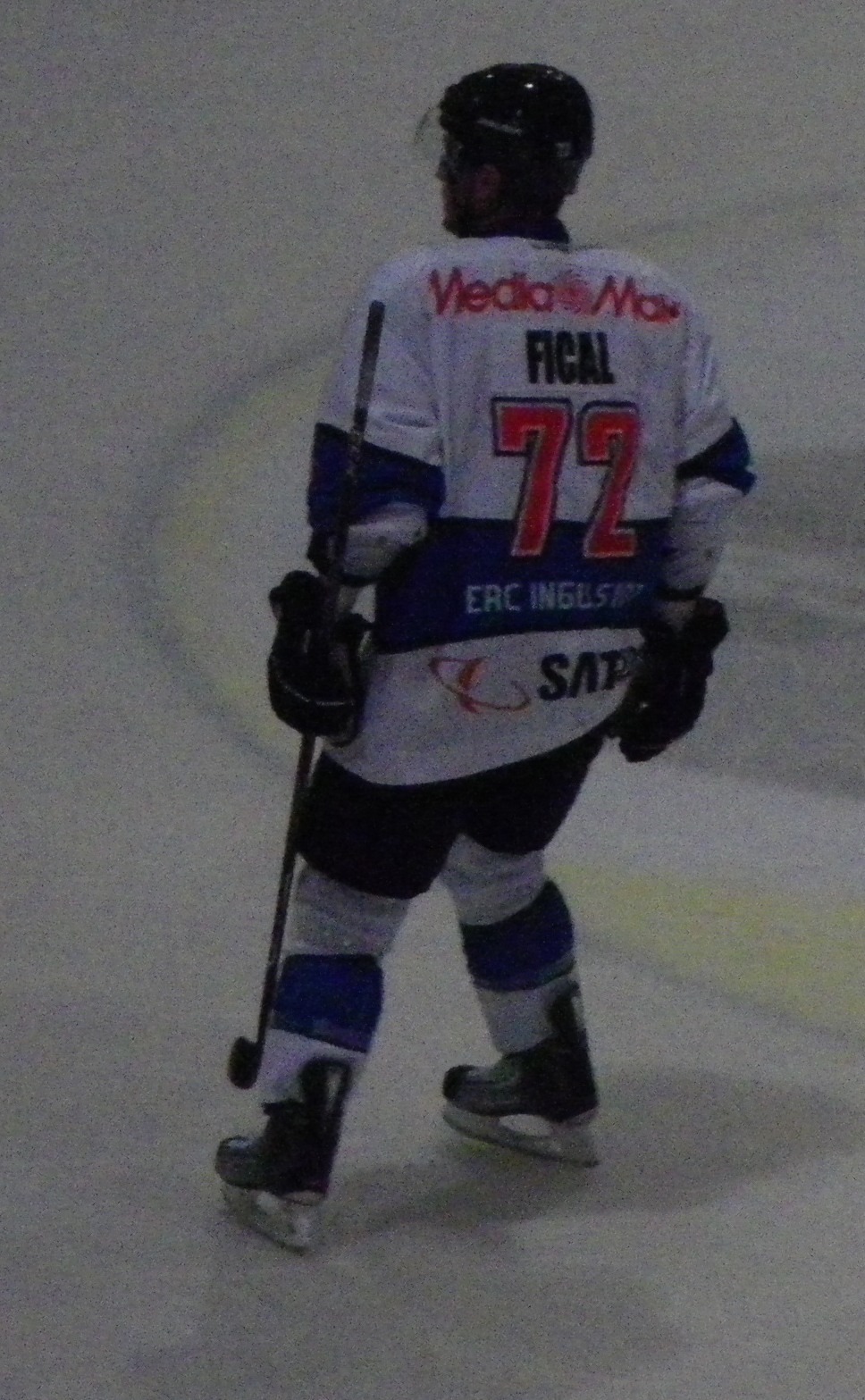
- Born: September 23, 1977 (age 48) Jindřichův Hradec, Czechoslovakia
- Height: 5 ft 10 in (178 cm)
- Weight: 181 lb (82 kg; 12 st 13 lb)
- Position: Right wing
- Shot: Right
- Played for: Czech Extraliga; HC Karlovy Vary; DEL; Essen Mosquitoes; Iserlohn Roosters; Nürnberg Ice Tigers; ERC Ingolstadt
- National team: Germany
- NHL draft: Undrafted
- Playing career: 2001–2016

Petr Fical (born 23 September 1977) is a Czech-born German former professional ice hockey player.

Fical competed with the Germany men's national ice hockey team at the 2006 Winter Olympics. He also competed with Team Germany at the 2004 World Cup of Hockey, and at the 2005, 2007, and 2008 IIHF World Championships.

== Career statistics ==
=== Regular season and playoffs ===
			Regular season					Playoffs
Season	Team	League	GP	G	A	Pts	PIM	GP	G	A	Pts	PIM
1995–96	EHC Straubing	DEU.2	46	10	8	18	30	—	—	—	—	—
1996–97	EHC Straubing	DEU.2	53	13	19	32	30	—	—	—	—	—
1997–98	HC Baník Sokolov	CZE.3
1998–99	Deggendorfer EC	DEU.3	58	41	35	76	30	—	—	—	—	—
1999–2000	EV Regensburg	DEU.3	59	50	24	74	63	—	—	—	—	—
2000–01	EV Regensburg	DEU.3	55	50	43	93	36	11	13	14	27	6
2001–02	Moskitos Essen	DEL	52	5	3	8	10	—	—	—	—	—
2002–03	Iserlohn Roosters	DEL	50	7	13	20	47	—	—	—	—	—
2003–04	Nürnberg Ice Tigers	DEL	51	10	17	27	48	6	0	0	0	2
2004–05	Nürnberg Ice Tigers	DEL	50	21	20	41	28	6	2	2	4	2
2005–06	Nürnberg Ice Tigers	DEL	52	12	17	29	50	4	0	0	0	0
2006–07	Nürnberg Ice Tigers	DEL	48	15	24	39	52	13	7	4	11	6
2007–08	Nürnberg Ice Tigers	DEL	52	22	12	34	79	5	0	1	1	6
2008–09	Nürnberg Ice Tigers	DEL	47	13	16	29	61	5	2	1	3	0
2009–10	Nürnberg Ice Tigers	DEL	50	11	11	22	20	5	3	0	3	2
2010–11	ERC Ingolstadt	DEL	50	5	7	12	26	4	0	0	0	0
2011–12	ERC Ingolstadt	DEL	52	0	9	9	24	6	1	0	1	0
2012–13	EV Regensburg	DEU.3	40	36	35	71	32	4	0	2	2	2
2013–14	EV Regensburg	DEU.3	44	22	25	47	26	—	—	—	—	—
2014–15	EV Regensburg	DEU.3	44	16	16	32	18	15	5	3	8	6
2015–16	Tornado Luxembourg	FRA.4	2	4	0	4	2	—	—	—	—	—
2019–20	Tornado Luxembourg	FRA.4	1	1	1	2	2	—	—	—	—	—
DEU.3 totals			300	215	178	393	205	30	18	19	37	14
DEL totals			554	121	149	270	445	54	15	8	23	18

=== International ===
Year	Team	Event	GP	G	A	Pts	PIM
2004	Germany	WCH	4	0	0	0	0
2005	Germany	WC	6	0	1	1	0
2006	Germany	OG	5	0	0	0	4
2006	Germany	WC B	5	1	2	3	2
2007	Germany	WC	6	0	0	0	10
2008	Germany	WC	6	0	0	0	2
Senior totals			32	1	3	4	18
