= Frank Hördler =

German ice hockey player (born 1985)

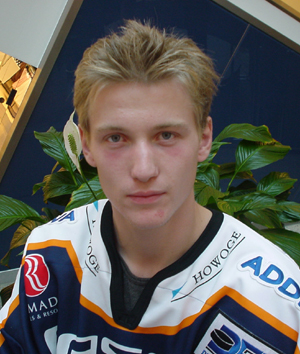
- Hördler in 2006
- Born: 26 January 1985 (age 41) Bad Muskau, East Germany
- Height: 6 ft 0 in (183 cm)
- Weight: 190 lb (86 kg; 13 st 8 lb)
- Position: Defence
- Shot: Left
- DEL2 team Former teams: VER Selb; Eisbären Berlin
- National team: Germany
- NHL draft: Undrafted
- Playing career: 2001–2025
Medal record
Olympic Games
Silver medal – second place	2018 Pyeongchang	Team

Frank Hördler (born 26 January 1985) is a German professional ice hockey defenceman who currently plays for VER Selb in the DEL2. He previously played the entirety of his professional career with Eisbären Berlin in the Deutsche Eishockey Liga, spending 20 seasons with the club in the DEL.

His elder brother David Hördler was also a hockey player and his son Eric also played alongside him with Eisbären Berlin.

== Career statistics ==
=== Regular season and playoffs ===
			Regular season					Playoffs
Season	Team	League	GP	G	A	Pts	PIM	GP	G	A	Pts	PIM
2001–02	ERC Selb	GER.3	15	0	2	2	2	1	0	0	0	0
2002–03	ERC Selb	GER.3	34	2	7	9	74	—	—	—	—	—
2003–04	Eisbären Berlin	DEL	39	1	1	2	20	—	—	—	—	—
2003–04	Eisbären Juniors Berlin	GER.4	—	—	—	—	—	13	4	2	6	61
2004–05	Eisbären Berlin	DEL	42	0	1	1	32	12	0	0	0	8
2004–05	Eisbären Juniors Berlin	GER.3	18	3	9	12	47	—	—	—	—	—
2005–06	Eisbären Berlin	DEL	50	3	15	18	91	11	2	2	4	12
2005–06	Eisbären Juniors Berlin	GER.3	1	0	0	0	0	—	—	—	—	—
2006–07	Eisbären Berlin	DEL	48	1	9	10	40	3	0	0	0	0
2007–08	Eisbären Berlin	DEL	56	1	15	16	58	14	1	2	3	6
2008–09	Eisbären Berlin	DEL	42	7	8	15	68	12	0	4	4	8
2009–10	Eisbären Berlin	DEL	23	0	7	7	24	5	0	1	1	8
2010–11	Eisbären Berlin	DEL	49	6	12	18	40	12	1	3	4	6
2011–12	Eisbären Berlin	DEL	45	3	17	20	38	13	1	2	3	20
2012–13	Eisbären Berlin	DEL	52	8	16	24	66	13	1	4	5	20
2013–14	Eisbären Berlin	DEL	37	3	16	19	32	3	0	0	0	2
2014–15	Eisbären Berlin	DEL	52	12	25	37	92	3	1	1	2	0
2015–16	Eisbären Berlin	DEL	23	3	6	9	24	7	0	4	4	4
2016–17	Eisbären Berlin	DEL	28	5	10	15	20	14	0	6	6	4
2017–18	Eisbären Berlin	DEL	30	2	8	10	12	18	3	11	14	18
2018–19	Eisbären Berlin	DEL	43	6	13	19	71	8	0	1	1	8
2019–20	Eisbären Berlin	DEL	52	6	11	17	38	—	—	—	—	—
2020–21	Eisbären Berlin	DEL	36	3	10	13	26	9	1	3	4	6
2021–22	Eisbären Berlin	DEL	50	5	23	28	52	12	0	4	4	4
2022–23	Eisbären Berlin	DEL	53	4	10	14	28	—	—	—	—	—
2023–24	Selber Wölfe	DEL2	50	4	13	17	31	—	—	—	—	—
2024–25	Selber Wölfe	DEL2	48	5	14	19	28	—	—	—	—	—
DEL totals			850	79	233	312	872	176	11	48	59	134

=== International ===
Year	Team	Event	GP	G	A	Pts	PIM
2002	Germany	U17		1	1	2
2002	Germany	WJC18	8	0	0	0	8
2003	Germany	WJC18 D1	5	0	6	6	8
2004	Germany	WJC D1	5	1	1	2	10
2006	Germany	WC D1	5	0	3	3	2
2007	Germany	WC	6	0	0	0	14
2008	Germany	WC	6	1	0	1	6
2009	Germany	OGQ	3	0	0	0	2
2009	Germany	WC	6	0	0	0	10
2010	Germany	WC	1	0	0	0	0
2011	Germany	WC	7	2	2	4	0
2013	Germany	WC	7	0	1	1	4
2014	Germany	WC	7	0	2	2	6
2016	Germany	OGQ	3	0	0	0	2
2017	Germany	WC	8	0	1	1	0
2018	Germany	OG	7	1	2	3	4
Junior totals			18	1	7	8	26
Senior totals			66	4	11	15	50

== Awards and honors ==
Award	Year
DEL
Champion (Eisbären Berlin)	2005, 2006, 2008, 2009, 2011, 2012, 2013, 2021, 2022
All-Star Game	2006, 2009
Defenseman of the Year	2015
