= Nikolai Goc =

German ice hockey player

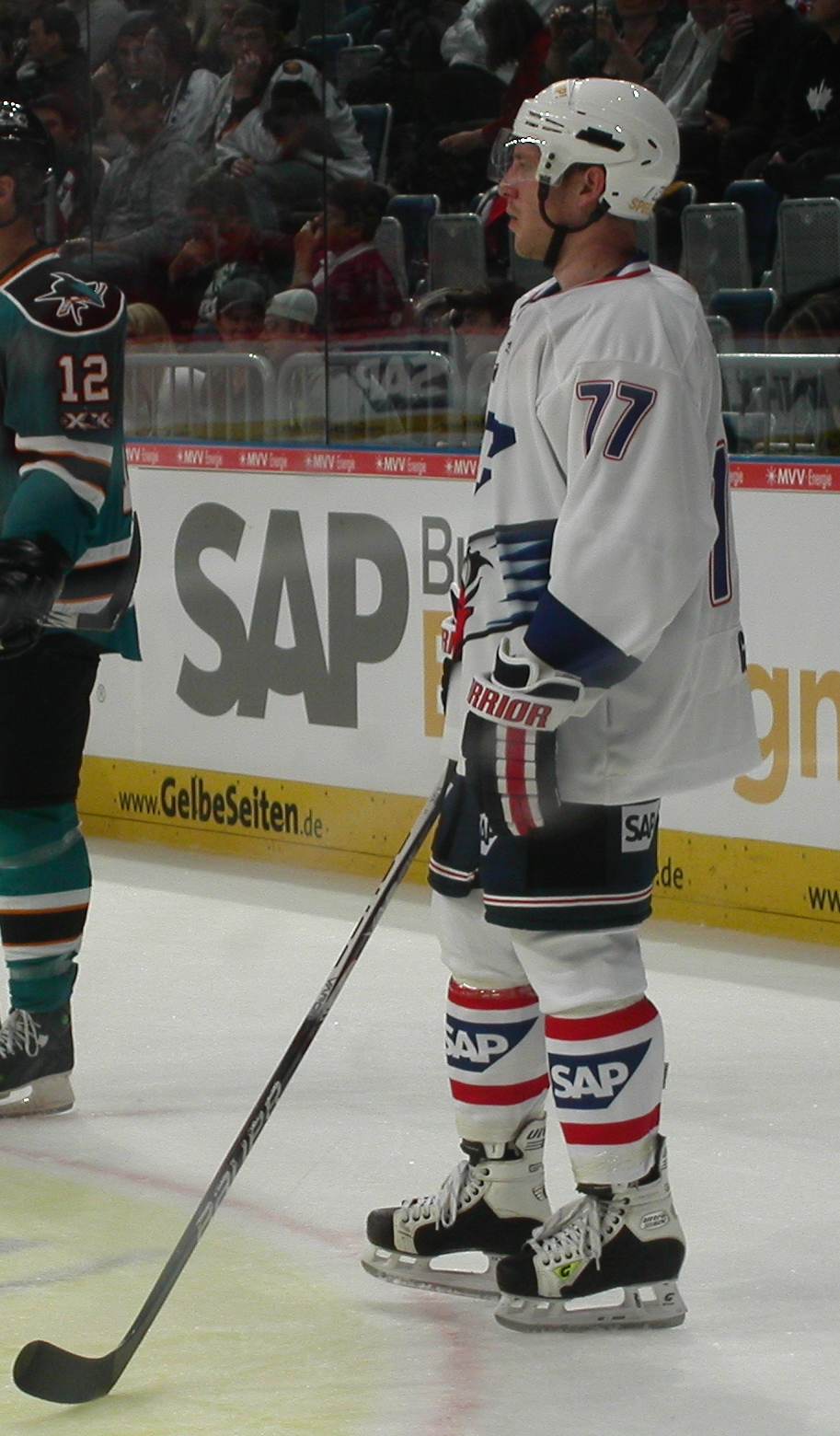
- Born: June 17, 1986 (age 39) Calw, West Germany
- Height: 6 ft 0 in (183 cm)
- Weight: 209 lb (95 kg; 14 st 13 lb)
- Position: Defence
- Shoots: Left
- DEL2 team Former teams: Bietigheim Steelers; SERC Wild Wings; Hannover Scorpions; Adler Mannheim
- National team: Germany
- NHL draft: Undrafted
- Playing career: 2003–present

Nikolai Goc (born June 17, 1986) is a German professional ice hockey defenceman who is currently playing with the Bietigheim Steelers in the DEL2. He previously played with Adler Mannheim in the Deutsche Eishockey Liga (DEL). He participated at the 2010 IIHF World Championship as a member of the German National men's ice hockey team.

He has played alongside, former veteran NHL player and brother Marcel during his tenure in Mannheim while also a teammate with his other older brother Sascha, during his time with the Schwenninger Wild Wings.

On July 26, 2018, Goc accepted a one-year contract to add a veteran presence to the Bietigheim Steelers of the DEL2.

== Career statistics ==
=== Regular season and playoffs ===
			Regular season					Playoffs
Season	Team	League	GP	G	A	Pts	PIM	GP	G	A	Pts	PIM
2002–03	SERC Wild Wings	DEL	1	0	0	0	0	—	—	—	—	—
2004–05	Wölfe Freiburg	2.GBun	50	1	2	3	52	—	—	—	—	—
2005–06	Wölfe Freiburg	2.GBun	48	0	0	0	81	—	—	—	—	—
2006–07	Hannover Scorpions	DEL	10	0	0	0	2	3	1	1	2	4
2006–07	Fischtown Pinguins	2.GBun	34	0	4	4	77	6	0	3	3	10
2007–08	Hannover Scorpions	DEL	44	0	8	8	30	3	0	0	0	0
2007–08	Fischtown Pinguins	2.GBun	11	1	1	2	14	—	—	—	—	—
2008–09	Hannover Scorpions	DEL	23	0	1	1	10	11	0	2	2	6
2008–09	Fischtown Pinguins	2.GBun	16	0	2	2	18	—	—	—	—	—
2009–10	Hannover Scorpions	DEL	45	1	6	7	38	11	0	1	1	10
2009–10	Fischtown Pinguins	2.GBun	1	0	0	0	0	—	—	—	—	—
2010–11	Hannover Scorpions	DEL	6	0	0	0	2	—	—	—	—	—
2010–11	Adler Mannheim	DEL	43	2	9	11	57	6	0	0	0	4
2011–12	Adler Mannheim	DEL	47	2	13	15	20	14	1	1	2	14
2012–13	Adler Mannheim	DEL	48	1	6	7	36	6	0	0	0	0
2013–14	Adler Mannheim	DEL	50	1	3	4	18	5	0	0	0	2
2014–15	Adler Mannheim	DEL	48	0	10	10	18	15	1	3	4	6
2015–16	Adler Mannheim	DEL	47	0	5	5	30	3	0	0	0	0
2016–17	Adler Mannheim	DEL	41	2	6	8	10	4	0	0	0	2
2017–18	Adler Mannheim	DEL	49	0	4	4	14	2	0	0	0	0
2018-19	Bietigheim Steelers	DEL2	51	0	11	11	59	1	0	1	1	0
2019-20	Bietigheim Steelers	DEL2	36	1	11	12	20	—	—	—	—	—
2020-21	Bietigheim Steelers	DEL2	32	0	7	7	26	—	—	—	—	—
DEL totals			502	9	71	80	285	83	3	8	11	48

=== International ===
Year	Team	Event	GP	G	A	Pts	PIM
2004	Germany	WJC18-D1	5	1	2	3	6
2006	Germany	WJC-D1	5	0	1	1	10
2009	Germany	WC	2	0	0	0	0
2010	Germany	WC	9	1	0	1	4
2011	Germany	WC	6	0	1	1	4
2012	Germany	WC	7	0	0	0	14
2013	Germany	OGQ	3	0	0	0	2
2013	Germany	WC	7	0	2	2	4
2015	Germany	WC	6	0	0	0	6
Junior totals			10	1	3	4	16
Senior totals			40	1	3	4	34
