= Robert Müller (ice hockey) =

German ice hockey player

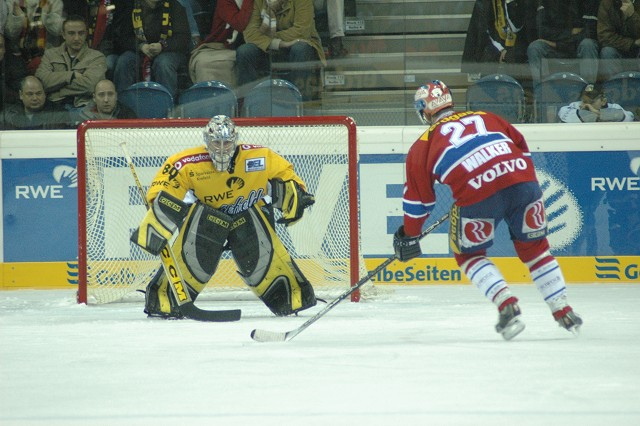
- Robert Müller (left) in 2004
- Born: 25 June 1980 Rosenheim, Bavaria, West Germany
- Died: 21 May 2009 (aged 28) Rosenheim, Bavaria, Germany
- Height: 5 ft 7 in (170 cm)
- Weight: 187 lb (85 kg; 13 st 5 lb)
- Position: Goaltender
- Caught: Left
- Played for: EHC Klostersee (2nd Bundesliga); Star Bulls Rosenheim (DEL); Adler Mannheim (DEL); Krefeld Pinguine (DEL); Füchse Duisburg (DEL); Kölner Haie (DEL)
- National team: Germany
- NHL draft: 275th overall, 2001; Washington Capitals
- Playing career: 1997–2009

Robert Müller (25 June 1980 – 21 May 2009) was a German professional ice hockey goaltender. He played in the Deutsche Eishockey Liga from 1998 to 2009.

== Career ==
Müller made his professional debut with EHC Klostersee of the 2nd Bundesliga in the 1997-98 season, before playing in the Deutsche Eishockey Liga (DEL) from 1998 to 2009. He won the league championship with the Krefeld Pinguine in 2002–03, repeating the feat with the Adler Mannheim in 2006–07.

The Washington Capitals of the National Hockey League (NHL) selected Müller as their ninth-round pick in the 2001 NHL entry draft, 275th overall, but he never played for the team.

== Illness and death ==
In November 2006, Müller was diagnosed with a malignant brain tumor, known as glioblastoma. Part of the tumor was surgically removed, followed by chemotherapy and radiation treatment later in the year. It appeared impossible for Müller to play professional ice hockey any longer, but he recovered and made his comeback on 3 February 2007 at the DEL All-Star Game 2007.

In 2008, Müller was named again to the national team at the Skoda Cup in Switzerland. In August of that same year, while playing for the Kölner Haie, the tumor continued to grow, requiring another operation. After that he absolved his physician, Wolfgang Wick, from patient/physician confidentiality. Wick told the media that Müller was terminally ill and already exceeded the anticipated average life, as only 3% of the people having the same cancer live over five years.

On 18 December 2008 Müller's doctor declared him no longer fit to play, as his condition grew worse. He died of brain cancer on 21 May 2009; he is survived by his two children.

After Müller's death it was announced that the Kölner Haie, Adler Mannheim, and EHC Klostersee would all retire his number 80. EHC Red Bull München also retired his number 80, even though Müller had never played for München. The DEL also announced that starting with the 2009/10 season, the number 80 would never be used in the league again.

In 2017 Müller's silhouette was used for the logo of the 2017 IIHF World Championship.

== Career statistics ==
			Regular season									Playoffs
Season	Team	League	GP	W	L	T	MIN	GA	SO	GAA	SV%	GP	W	L	MIN	GA	SO	GAA	SV%
1997–98	EHC Klostersee	2nd Bundesliga	45	28	17		2581	151	1	3.55		--	--	--	--	--	--	--	--
1998–99	Star Bulls Rosenheim	DEL	32				1863	105	1	3.38	0.881	--	--	--	--	--	--	--	--
1999–00	Star Bulls Rosenheim	DEL	50				2228	131	1	3.50	0.879	--	--	--	--	--	--	--	--
2000–01	Adler Mannheim	DEL	60				1299	51	1	2.36	0.912	2			103			1.16	.966
2001–02	Adler Mannheim	DEL	15				638	26	1	2.45	0.887	12
2002–03	Krefeld Pinguine	DEL	50				2763	107	5	2.32	0.912	14						1.99	.918
2003–04	Krefeld Pinguine	DEL	49				2892	131	6	2.72	0.914	--	--	--	--	--	--	--	--
2004–05	Krefeld Pinguine	DEL	47				2769	136	1	2.95	0.914	--	--	--	--	--	--	--	--
2005–06	Krefeld Pinguine	DEL	51				3003	154	1	3.08	0.888	5						4.24	.864
2006–07	Adler Mannheim	DEL	23							2.61	0.915	1	0	0		0	0	0.00	1.000
2007–08	Adler Mannheim	DEL	5	0	2	0	232	11	0	2.84	.917	--	--	--	--	--	--	--	--
2007–08	Füchse Duisburg	DEL	12	5	6	0	697	37	0	3.18	.902	--	--	--	--	--	--	--	--
2007–08	Kölner Haie	DEL	24	13	4	0	1461	65	1	2.67	.916	14
2008–09	Kölner Haie	DEL	2	0	0	0	12	0	0	0.00	1.000	--	--	--	--	--	--	--	--
