= Fabrice Lhenry =

French ice hockey player

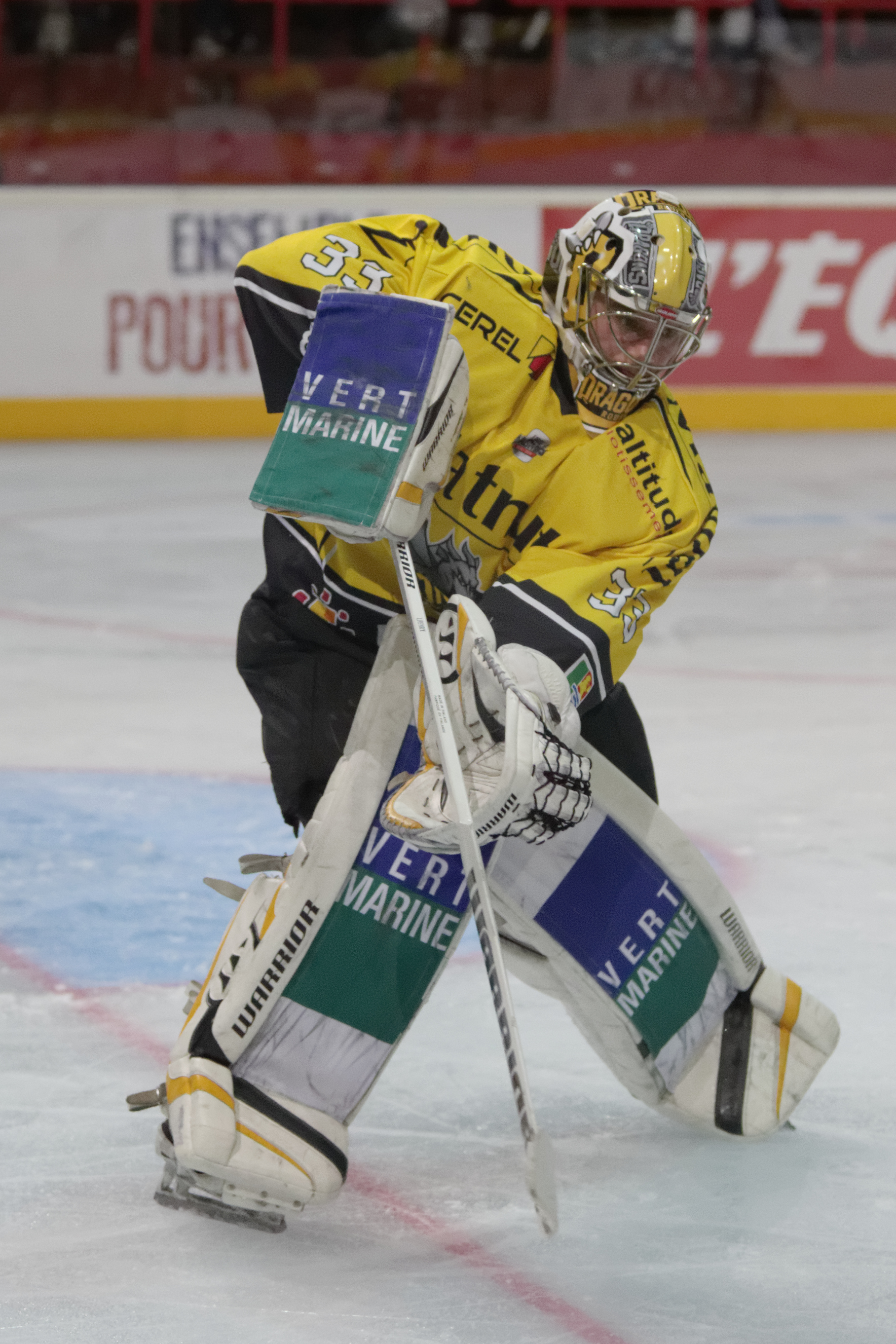
- Born: June 29, 1972 (age 52); Lyon, France
- Height: 5 ft 11 in (180 cm)
- Weight: 181 lb (82 kg; 12 st 13 lb)
- Position: Goaltender
- Caught: Left
- Played for: Chamonix HC; Brest Albatros Hockey; Frankfurt Lions; Milano Vipers; Scorpions de Mulhouse; EfB Ishockey; Dragons de Rouen
- National team: France
- Playing career: 1992–2015

Fabrice Lhenry (born June 29, 1972) is a French former professional ice hockey goaltender. He is currently the head coach of Dragons de Rouen of the Ligue Magnus.

Lhenry played the majority of his career in France with a visit to the Germany (1997–98 and 1998–99) and Italy (2000–01) before going to Denmark. From beginning of season 2005, Lhenry played in the newly formed EfB Ishockey in Esbjerg, Denmark and from 2006 alongside France international teammate Olivier Coqueux. After four seasons in Esbjerg, Lhenry returned to France to play in the Ligue Magnus for Dragons de Rouen from season 2009–10 until his retirement in 2015.

Lhenry was also a regular member of the France men's national ice hockey team. He played his first Ice Hockey World Championships in 2000.
