= Daniel Kreutzer =

German ice hockey player (born 1979)

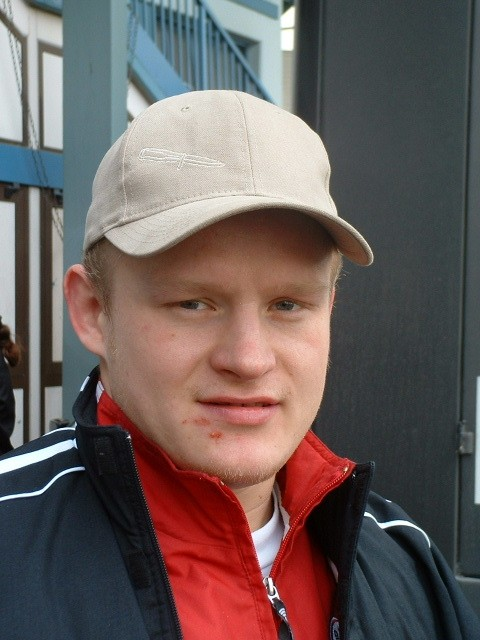
- Born: October 23, 1979 (age 46) Düsseldorf, West Germany
- Height: 1.76 m (5 ft 9 in)
- Weight: 86 kg (190 lb; 13 st 8 lb)
- Position: Right wing
- Shot: Left
- Played for: Düsseldorfer EG; Revierlöwen Oberhausen; Kassel Huskies
- National team: Germany
- Playing career: 1996–2017

Daniel Kreutzer (born October 23, 1979) is a German retired professional ice hockey forward who spent most of his career with Düsseldorfer EG of the Deutsche Eishockey Liga (DEL).

== Career ==
Having come through the youth ranks of Düsseldorfer EG, Kreutzer made his debut in the German top-flight Deutsche Eishockey Liga (DEL) in the 1996-97 season. After spending time with Revier Löwen Oberhausen and the Kassel Huskies between 1997 and 2002, he returned to Düsseldorf and became a pillar of the DEG side. Kreutzer reached the finals with the Düsseldorf team in 2006 and 2009, but would never win the German championship. A long-time DEG team captain, he appeared in a total of 1060 DEL contests, scoring 270 goals, while assisting on 529 more. He announced his retirement on August 17, 2017. Internationally, Kreutzer won 201 caps for the German men's national team, participating in the 2002 and 2006 Olympic Games and several world championships.

== Career statistics ==
=== Regular season and playoffs ===
			Regular season					Playoffs
Season	Team	League	GP	G	A	Pts	PIM	GP	G	A	Pts	PIM
1994–95	Düsseldorfer EG	DEU U18	19	27	27	54	55	—	—	—	—	—
1994–95	Düsseldorfer EG	DEU U20	24	8	19	27	22	—	—	—	—	—
1996–97	Düsseldorfer EG	DEL	14	1	2	3	6	3	0	0	0	6
1996–97	EV Duisburg	DEU.2	14	5	6	11	30	—	—	—	—	—
1997–98	Revierlöwen Oberhausen	DEL	34	3	8	11	55	3	1	1	2	0
1998–99	Kassel Huskies	DEL	49	8	12	20	76	—	—	—	—	—
1999–2000	Kassel Huskies	DEL	52	7	16	23	91	7	0	2	2	16
2000–01	Kassel Huskies	DEL	60	12	29	41	89	8	3	4	7	2
2001–02	Kassel Huskies	DEL	60	16	30	46	54	7	3	3	6	4
2002–03	DEG Metro Stars	DEL	52	8	25	33	92	5	2	2	4	8
2003–04	DEG Metro Stars	DEL	50	26	26	52	78	4	0	2	2	6
2004–05	DEG Metro Stars	DEL	52	19	32	51	54	—	—	—	—	—
2005–06	DEG Metro Stars	DEL	51	21	36	57	85	14	4	5	9	32
2006–07	DEG Metro Stars	DEL	44	14	30	44	70	9	0	8	8	22
2007–08	DEG Metro Stars	DEL	34	6	13	19	83	11	2	3	5	10
2008–09	DEG Metro Stars	DEL	49	18	25	43	113	16	3	10	13	10
2009–10	DEG Metro Stars	DEL	54	19	34	53	107	3	2	0	2	14
2010–11	DEG Metro Stars	DEL	52	18	34	52	32	9	0	5	5	22
2011–12	DEG Metro Stars	DEL	51	10	34	44	42	7	1	7	8	18
2012–13	Düsseldorfer EG	DEL	42	11	21	32	82	—	—	—	—	—
2013–14	Düsseldorfer EG	DEL	17	4	11	15	55	—	—	—	—	—
2014–15	Düsseldorfer EG	DEL	52	14	28	42	50	12	2	5	7	14
2015–16	Düsseldorfer EG	DEL	51	8	21	29	36	5	0	1	1	4
2016–17	Düsseldorfer EG	DEL	17	4	4	8	10	—	—	—	—	—
DEL totals			937	247	471	718	1360	123	23	58	81	188

=== International ===
Year	Team	Event	GP	G	A	Pts	PIM
1996	Germany	EJC	5	1	1	2	6
1997	Germany	WJC	3	0	2	2	0
1997	Germany	EJC	6	2	2	4	8
1998	Germany	WJC	6	0	2	2	6
1999	Germany	WJC B	6	1	3	4	8
1999	Germany	WC B	7	1	1	2	16
2000	Germany	OGQ	1	0	4	4	0
2000	Germany	WC B	7	4	3	7	12
2001	Germany	OGQ	3	0	0	0	0
2001	Germany	WC	7	2	2	4	4
2002	Germany	OG	7	0	0	0	0
2002	Germany	WC	7	1	2	3	27
2003	Germany	WC	7	2	1	3	4
2004	Germany	WC	6	1	2	3	4
2004	Germany	WCH	4	1	1	2	4
2005	Germany	WC	6	1	1	2	6
2006	Germany	OG	5	0	2	2	2
2006	Germany	WC D1	5	2	4	6	4
2007	Germany	WC	6	0	2	2	6
2009	Germany	WC	6	0	0	0	2
2010	Germany	WC	7	1	3	4	6
2011	Germany	WC	5	0	0	0	2
Junior totals			26	4	10	14	28
Senior totals			96	16	28	44	99
