= Marc Levers =

English ice hockey player

- Born: 30 June 1981 (age 44) Derby, ENG
- Height: 5 ft 10 in (178 cm)
- Weight: 174 lb (79 kg; 12 st 6 lb)
- Position: Forward
- Shoots: Right
- NIHL team Former teams: Nottingham Lions; Isle of Wight Raiders; Basingstoke Bison; Belfast Giants; Nottingham Panthers; Peterborough Phantoms
- National team: Great Britain
- Playing career: 2000–present

Marc Levers (born 30 June 1981) is an English professional ice hockey player currently playing for the Nottingham Lions in the National Ice Hockey League.

Levers first played for the Panthers during the 2000–01 Ice Hockey Superleague season, playing 15 games. He then had spells with the Isle of Wight Raiders and the Basingstoke Bison before rejoining the Panthers in 2003 who were now playing in the Elite Ice Hockey League which replaced the Superleague and won the Challenge Cup that season. Levers then joined the Belfast Giants in 2004 where he spent 3 seasons, winning the Elite League title in 2006. His performances with the Giants earned him a place in the Great Britain national ice hockey team and played in two world championships.

In 2007, Levers returned to the Nottingham Pathers where he remained through the 2011–12 season, winning four more Challenge Cups and two Playoff titles. He moved to the Peterborough Phantoms for the 2013–14 season.
