= Krisztián Palkovics =

Hungarian ice hockey player (born 1975)

- Born: July 10, 1975 (age 49); Székesfehérvár, Hungary
- Height: 6 ft 2 in (188 cm)
- Weight: 202 lb (92 kg; 14 st 6 lb)
- Caught: Left
- Played for: Alba Volán Székesfehérvár
- Playing career: 1993–2012

Krisztian Palkovics (born July 10, 1975 in Székesfehérvár, Hungary) is a retired Hungarian professional ice hockey right-winger.

== Career statistics ==
| | Seasons | GP | Goals | Assists | Pts | PIM |
|---|---|---|---|---|---|---|
| Regular season | 4 | 197 | 94 | 89 | 183 | 86 |
| Playoffs | 1 | 4 | 3 | 3 | 6 | 0 |
