= Marco Pewal =

Austrian ice hockey player

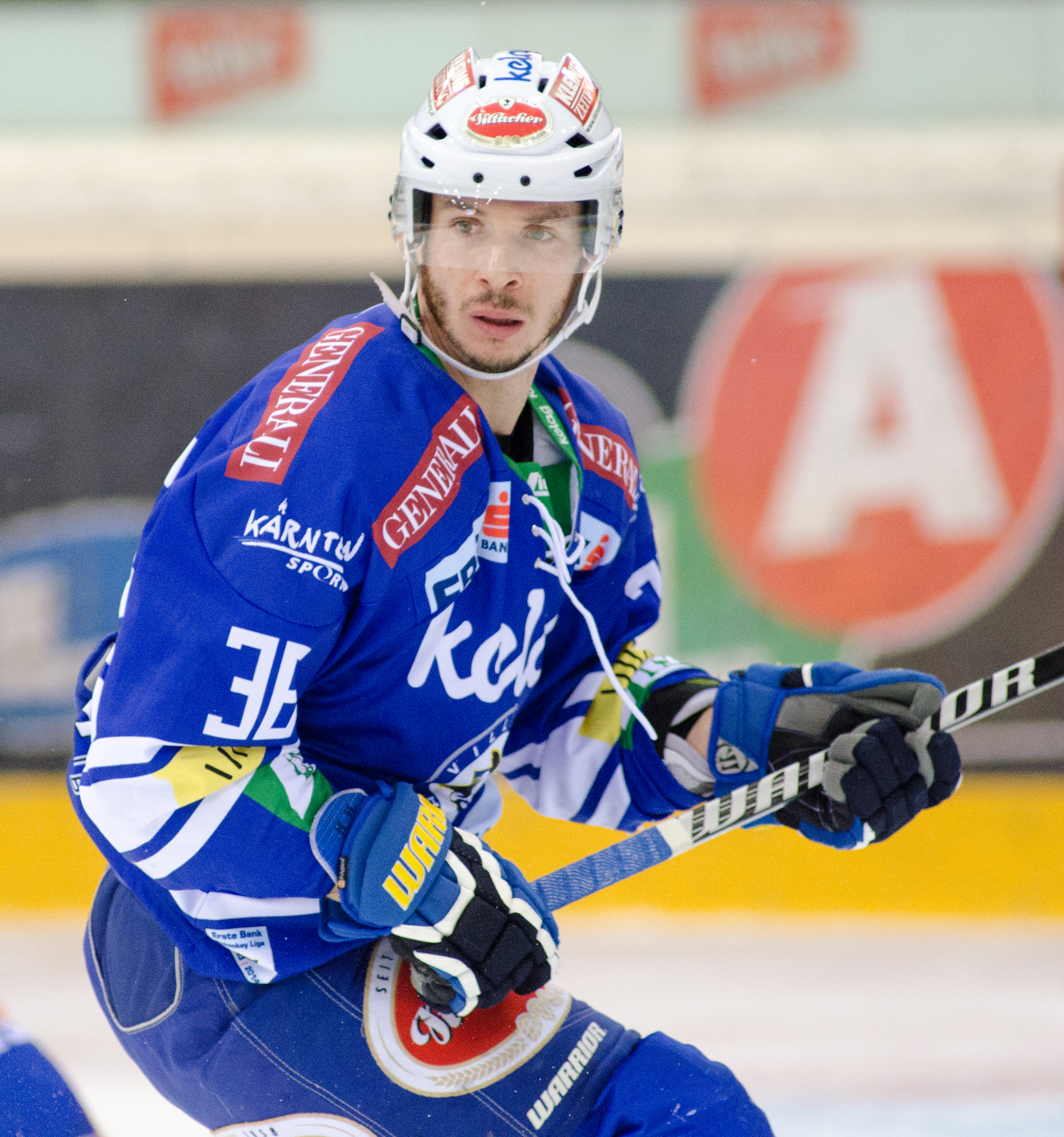
- Born: September 17, 1978 (age 46); Villach, Austria
- Height: 5 ft 10 in (178 cm)
- Weight: 172 lb (78 kg; 12 st 4 lb)
- Position: Forward
- Shot: Left
- Played for: EC VSV; DEK Klagenfurt; EK Zell am See; EC Red Bull Salzburg
- National team: Austria
- Playing career: 1999–2015

Marco Pewal (born September 17, 1978 in Villach) is an Austrian former professional ice hockey forward who last played with EC VSV of the Austrian Hockey League (EBEL). He participated at the 2011 IIHF World Championship as a member of the Austria men's national ice hockey team. He is currently an assistant coach in EC VSV junior youth program.
