= Mark Szücs =

Canadian-born Austrian ice hockey player

- Born: November 4, 1974 (age 50); Toronto, Ontario, Canada
- Height: 5 ft 10 in (178 cm)
- Weight: 181 lb (82 kg; 12 st 13 lb)
- Position: Left wing
- Shot: Left
- Played for: VEU Feldkirch; EHC Black Wings Linz
- National team: Austria
- Playing career: 1999–2010

Mark Szücs (born November 4, 1976, in Toronto, Ontario) is a Canadian-born Austrian former professional ice hockey left winger.

Szücs spent four seasons in Union College before moving to Austria in 1999 with VEU Feldkirch. In 2000 he moved to EHC Black Wings Linz where he remained until his retirement in 2010, playing over 400 games for the team. He has worked as an assistant coach for Linz since retiring as a player.

He became an Austrian citizen and played for the Austria national team in the 2002, 2003 and 2004 IIHF World Championship.

== Career statistics ==
			Regular season					Playoffs
Season	Team	League	GP	G	A	Pts	PIM	GP	G	A	Pts	PIM
1994–95	St. Michael's Buzzers	MetJHL	39	26	17	43	66	—	—	—	—	—
1995–96	Union College	NCAA	20	7	1	8	10	—	—	—	—	—
1996–97	Union College	NCAA	31	6	14	20	14	—	—	—	—	—
1997–98	Union College	NCAA	29	10	7	17	20	—	—	—	—	—
1998–99	Union College	NCAA	30	9	5	14	39	—	—	—	—	—
1999–00	VEU Feldkirch	IEL	31	10	18	28	34	—	—	—	—	—
1999–00	VEU Feldkirch	Austria	8	2	7	9	12	—	—	—	—	—
2000–01	Black Wings Linz	Austria	44	19	29	48	89	—	—	—	—	—
2001–02	Black Wings Linz	Austria	28	18	19	37	24	13	4	9	13	26
2002–03	Black Wings Linz	Austria	42	25	30	55	32	10	7	4	11	10
2003–04	Black Wings Linz	EBEL	48	17	21	38	30	3	1	1	2	0
2004–05	Black Wings Linz	EBEL	35	16	16	32	53	—	—	—	—	—
2005–06	Black Wings Linz	EBEL	48	19	11	30	81	—	—	—	—	—
2006–07	Black Wings Linz	EBEL	46	9	25	34	97	3	1	1	2	12
2007–08	Black Wings Linz	EBEL	37	5	9	14	42	11	0	5	5	2
2008–09	Black Wings Linz	EBEL	20	6	5	11	28	10	1	0	1	20
2009–10	Black Wings Linz	EBEL	43	5	7	12	67	18	1	7	8	28
Austria totals			122	64	85	149	157	23	11	13	24	36
EBEL totals			277	77	94	171	398	45	4	14	18	62
