= Egidijus Bauba =

- Born: 25 March 1977 (age 47); Kaunas, Lithuanian SSR, Soviet Union
- Height: 6 ft 0 in (183 cm)
- Weight: 190 lb (86 kg; 13 st 8 lb)
- Position: Forward
- Shot: Left
- Played for: Energija Elektrėnai; HC Slezan Opava; Tivali Minsk; DHK Latgale; Swindon Wildcats
- National team: Lithuania
- Playing career: 1995–2016

Egidius Bauba (born25 March 1977) is a Lithuanian professional ice hockey coach and former player. Having scored 98 points for the Lithuanian national ice hockey team, he is the most successful scorer in its history. His older brother Dainius also played for the Lithuanian national team.

== Career ==
Bauba began his career as an ice hockey player in Elektrėnai with the Eastern European Hockey League club SC Energija at age 18. In 1996 he transferred to the Czech Republic, where he first played for HC Slezan Opava, in both the Czech U20-League and Extraliga, the highest division in the country. From 1997 to 1999, he played for various lower-league clubs in the second- and third-level Czech division. In 1998, he won the 2nd Czech Republic Hockey League championship with HC Šumperk, but failed in the playoffs for the 1st Czech Republic Hockey League.

Subsequently, Bauba once more played for his first club in Elektrènai. During his spell there, he played in the Lithuanian, Eastern European, and Latvian hockey leagues, where he was leading goal scorer in 2004. In the 1999-2000 season, he also played for and won the championship with Tivali Minsk in the Belarusian Extraleague. After seven years with SC Energija, Bauba played for the Latvian DHK Latgale for four years, claiming a spot in the 2008 All-Star Game as well as the top scorer and goal scorer title in 2010.

In 2010, he moved to England where he played for the English Premier Ice Hockey League side Swindon Wildcats and the Bristol Pitbulls in the National Ice Hockey League. He spent the last two years of his playing career from 2014 to 2016 with Bergen IK, playing in the second Norwegian division. Bauba has been working as an assistant coach at the club since his retirement in 2016.

=== International ===
Bauba played ice hockey competitively for multiple Lithuanian junior teams and represented his country in the 1994 IIHF European U18 Championship in Group C. He then entered the IIHF European U18 Championship again in 1995, where he was top scorer of the Group C2. He was also successful during the U20 World Championships, and was named the best forward in Group D in 1996 and 1997.

While playing for the senior team, Bauba contributed to his team's success in the 1995 World Championships (Group C2), and 1996 World Championships (Group C2), where Lithuania was promoted to Group C, and subsequently the World Championship Group C (1997, 1998, 1999, 2000). Following the establishment of a new divisional structure for the World Championships, Bauba and Lithuania played in Division I in 2001, 2003, 2005, 2006, 2007, 2008, 2009, 2010, 2011, and 2015. Following relegation in the previous year, Bauba became top scorer and top goal scorer in Division II in the 2002, as well as the 2004 World Championships, gaining promotion back to Division I in both years.

Bauba also competed in the pre-qualification tournament for the Winter Olympics in Turin in 2006.

== Awards and honors ==
Award	Year
2nd Czech Republic Hockey League champion	1998
Belarusian Extraleague champion	2000
Latvian Hockey Higher League top goal scorer	2004
Latvian Hockey Higher League All-Star Team	2008
Latvian Hockey Higher League top scorer and top goal scorer	2010

=== International ===
Award	Year
IIHF European U18 Championship (C2 Group) top scorer	1995
World Junior Ice Hockey Championships (Pool D) best forward	1996
World Junior Ice Hockey Championships (Pool D) best forward	1997
Men's World Ice Hockey Championships (Division II, Group B) top scorer and top goal scorer	2002
