= Gábor Ocskay =

Hungarian ice hockey player (1975–2009)

- Born: 11 September 1975 Budapest, Hungary
- Died: 24 March 2009 (aged 33) Budapest, Hungary
- Height: 5 ft 10 in (178 cm)
- Weight: 185 lb (84 kg; 13 st 3 lb)
- Position: Center
- Shot: Right
- Played for: Alba Volán Székesfehérvár
- National team: Hungary
- Playing career: 1992–2009

Gábor Ocskay Jr. (Hungarian: ifjabb Ocskay Gábor; 11 September 1975 – 24 March 2009) was a Hungarian ice hockey player. As the center of the first line, he played a huge part in his national team's promotion to the 2009 World Championship. He died of a heart attack weeks before the start of the 2009 Championships. Ocskay was posthumously awarded the Torriani Award by the International Ice Hockey Federation (IIHF) in 2016, and was inducted into the IIHF Hall of Fame.

== Domestic career ==
Ocskay was born in Budapest, but spent his childhood in Székesfehérvár, Fejér county and during his entire career he played for Alba Volán Székesfehérvár. Officially he had been a member of the club since 1983 and that time he had started to develop a famed on-ice relationship with right winger Krisztián Palkovics. Among hockey fans in Hungary the pair was just known as "The Twins".

Started to play regularly in the Hungarian First Division in the 1993–94 season and won the championship nine times, the last seven being consecutive. After long-time captain, Balázs Kangyal had left the team, he became his successor, but due to some difficulties at the end of the 2008-09 EBEL regular season, he decided to give up this position. However, he had been the real spiritual leader of the team for a long time.

== International play ==
Ocskay played 187 games for the Hungarian national team and since 1993, including each World Championship appearance. Hungary won the Pool C (now Division II) tournament in 1998 and 2000, the 2008 Division I tournament, and gained promotion to the Ice Hockey World Championships for the first time since 1939.

== Death ==
In 2004, he was diagnosed with a heart disease and sidelined for four months, but later received a medical permission to continue his career. He died of a heart attack in Budapest late on 24 March 2009, aged 33, three days after helping his side win its tenth Hungarian title.

After the shocking news of his death, both his club and the Hungarian Federation has decided to retire his famous #19 jersey from their teams. On the day of his funeral, the ice hall of Székesfehérvár has been named after him. Ice hockey fans around the country have started to raise money to build a statue for him in front of the entrance of the ice hall.

== Awards ==
- Hungarian Player of the Year

1994, 1995 and 2006

- Best Scorer of the Hungarian First Division

1994-95, 1997-98, 1998-99

- Best Forward of the Hungarian First Division

1993-94, 2006-07

- Torriani Award and the IIHF Hall of Fame

2016

== See also ==
- List of ice hockey players who died during their playing career
