= Roland Kaspitz =

Austrian ice hockey player

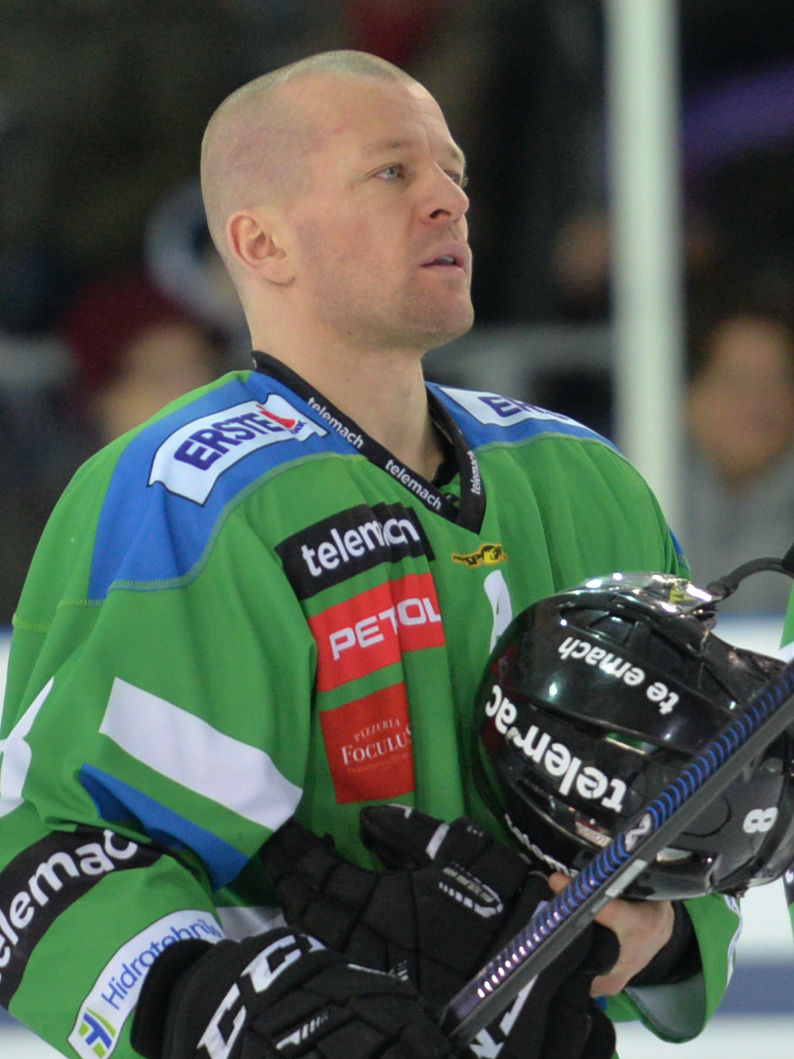
- Born: November 1, 1981 (age 44) Spittal an der Drau, Austria
- Height: 5 ft 7 in (170 cm)
- Weight: 181 lb (82 kg; 12 st 13 lb)
- Position: Forward
- Shot: Left
- Played for: EC VSV; HC TWK Innsbruck; EV Landshut; Asplöven HC; Graz 99ers HDD Olimpija Ljubljana; LHC Les Lions
- National team: Austria
- Playing career: 1999–2017

Roland Kaspitz (born November 1, 1981, in Spittal an der Drau) is an Austrian former professional ice hockey forward.

Kaspitz began his career with EC VSV, playing with the team until 2004 when he joined HC TWK Innsbruck. He only stayed with Innsbruck for one season though before returning to VSV where he stayed for seven more seasons until 2012. He then moved to the Landshut Cannibals of the 2nd Bundesliga for one season before joining Asplöven HC of Sweden's Hockeyallsvenskan. After just one goal in 20 games however, he was released and he finished the 2013-14 season with EBEL side the Graz 99ers, before returning for a second stint with HC TWK Innsbruck on September 24, 2014.

On August 15, 2015, Kaspitz signed with Slovenian EBEL competitors, HDD Olimpija Ljubljana. He would return to Graz on January 21, 2016, before joining LHC Les Lionsof the French Ligue Magnus.

Kaspitz was a member of the Austria men's national ice hockey team and played in five IIHF World Championships.
