= Viktor Tokaji =

Hungarian ice hockey player (born 1977)

- Born: January 11, 1977 (age 48); Dunaújváros, Hungary
- Height: 5 ft 11 in (180 cm)
- Weight: 181 lb (82 kg; 12 st 13 lb)
- Shot: Left
- Played for: Dunaferr SE; Huddinge IK; Alba Volán Székesfehérvár; MAC Budapest
- National team: Hungary
- Playing career: 1994–2016

Viktor Tokaji (born January 11, 1977, in Dunaújváros, Hungary) is a Hungarian former professional ice hockey defenceman who most notably played for Austrian Hockey League (EBEL) side, Alba Volán Székesfehérvár.

== Playing career ==
Tokaji originally played for Dunaferr SE Dunaújváros from 1993 to 2006. In the 2006–07 season he transferred to Sweden, where he played for Huddinge IK. From 2007 to 2015, he had been one of the leaders of his team, Alba Volán Székesfehérvár.

Tokaji has played over 150 games for the Hungary national ice hockey team.
