= Jeremy Rebek =

Canadian-born Austrian ice hockey player

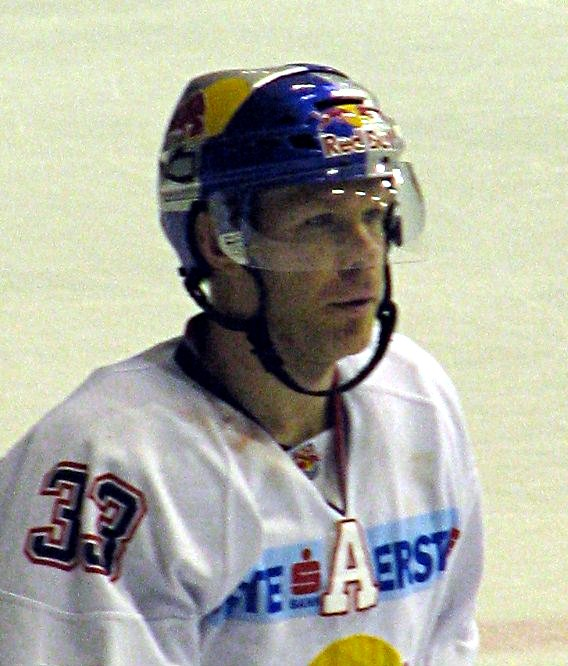
- Born: February 8, 1976 (age 49); Sault Ste. Marie, Ontario, Canada
- Height: 5 ft 10 in (178 cm)
- Weight: 194 lb (88 kg; 13 st 12 lb)
- Position: Defence
- Shot: Right
- Played for: Kansas City Blades; Milwaukee Admirals; Chicago Wolves; Graz 99ers HC Ambrì-Piotta; EC KAC; EC Red Bull Salzburg; Vienna Capitals; Belfast Giants; Asiago Hockey 1935
- National team: Austria
- NHL draft: Undrafted
- Playing career: 1997–2013

Jeremy Rebek (born February 10, 1976) is a Canadian-born Austrian former professional ice hockey defenceman.

== Playing career ==
Rebek first moved to the Austrian Hockey League (also known as the Erste Bank Eishockey Liga or EBEL) in 2003 with the Graz 99ers. He remained for three seasons which also included a brief spell in Switzerland for HC Ambri-Piotta. He also became eligible to represent Austria in international competitions. He later had spells with EC KAC, EC Red Bull Salzburg and the Vienna Capitals.

On July 27, 2011, the Belfast Giants announced that they had signed Rebek as a free agent for the 2010–11 season. He was made the team's captain during that season. He then moved to Italy joining Asiago Hockey 1935 of the Serie A but only played three games for the team before retiring during his 17th professional season.
