= Artūras Katulis =

Lithuanian ice hockey player (born 1981)

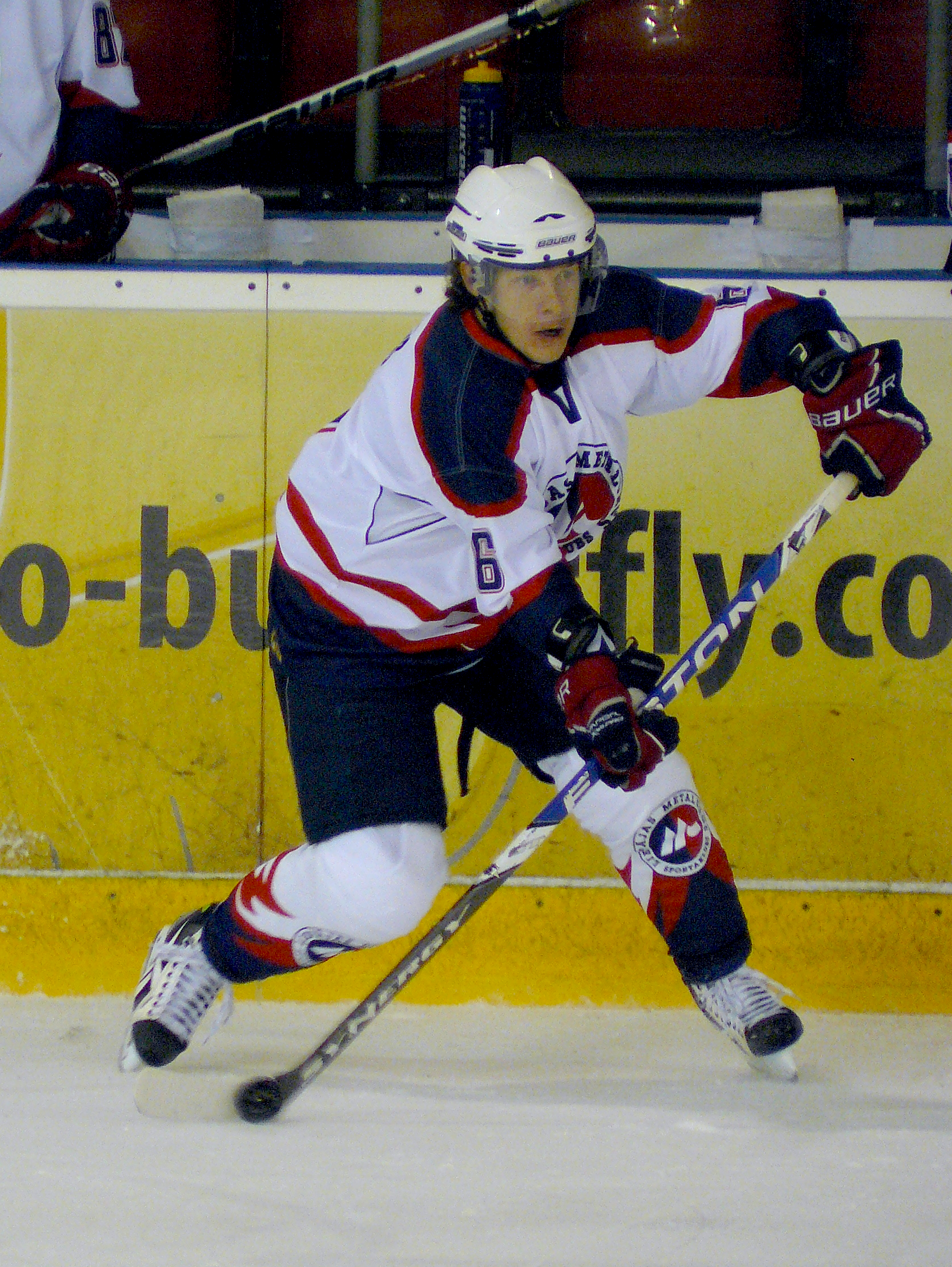
- Born: August 5, 1981 (age 44) Elektrėnai, Lithuanian SSR, Soviet Union
- Height: 5 ft 8 in (173 cm)
- Weight: 174 lb (79 kg; 12 st 6 lb)
- Position: Defence
- OHL team Former teams: Energija/GV Elektrėnai; Yantar Seversk; HK Neman Grodno; Neftyanik Leninogorsk; Kristall Saratov; SønderjyskE Ishockey; SaiPa; Dizel Penza; Neftyanik Almetyevsk; HK Liepājas Metalurgs; HC Berkut
- National team: Lithuania
- Playing career: 1997–present

Artūras Katulis (born August 5, 1981) is a Lithuanian professional ice hockey player.

== Career statistics ==
	Seasons	GP	Goals	Assists	Pts	PIM
SM-liiga-Regular season	1	44	0	5	5	26
SM-liiga-Playoffs	–	–	–	–	–	–
Vysshaya Liga-Regular season	5	208	21	29	50	158
Vysshaya Liga-Playoffs	3	12	0	3	3	8
Oddset Ligaen-Regular season	1	36	2	9	11	59
Oddset Ligaen-Playoffs	1	13	0	2	2	8
Belarusian Extraleague-Regular season	3	130	11	25	36	109
Belarusian Extraleague-Playoffs	3	11	0	2	2	6
Pervaya Liga-Regular season	4	43	14	16	30	56
Pervaya Liga-Playoffs	-	-	-	-	-	-
