= Michał Garbocz =

Polish ice hockey forward

- Born: March 12, 1973 (age 52); Katowice, Poland
- Height: 5 ft 7 in (170 cm)
- Weight: 183 lb (83 kg; 13 st 1 lb)
- Position: Forward
- Shot: Left
- Played for: KKH Katowice; TH Unia Oświęcim; Anglet Hormadi Élite; GKS Tychy
- National team: Poland
- Playing career: 1991–2013

Michał Garbocz (born March 12, 1973) is a Polish former professional ice hockey forward.

Garbocz played in the Polska Hokej Liga for KKH Katowice, TH Unia Oświęcim and GKS Tychy. He also played in the French Ligue Magnus for Anglet Hormadi Élite from 2001 to 2007. He also played in the 2002 World Ice Hockey Championships for Poland.

He is the younger brother of Dariusz Garbocz who played in the 1992 Winter Olympics for Poland.
