= Paul Moran (ice hockey) =

English ice hockey player

- Born: 10 May 1983 (age 41); Nottingham, ENG
- Height: 5 ft 10 in (178 cm)
- Weight: 181 lb (82 kg; 12 st 13 lb)
- Position: Defence
- Shot: Right
- Played for: Nottingham Panthers; Nottingham Lions; Milton Keynes Kings; Solihull Kings; Sheffield Steelers; Belfast Giants; Hull Stingrays
- National team: Great Britain
- Playing career: 2000–2009

Paul Moran (born 10 May 1983) is an English former professional ice hockey player. He played in the Elite Ice Hockey League for the Nottingham Panthers, Sheffield Steelers, Belfast Giants and Hull Stingrays. He also played for the Great Britain national ice hockey team.
