= Olivier Coqueux =

French ice hockey player

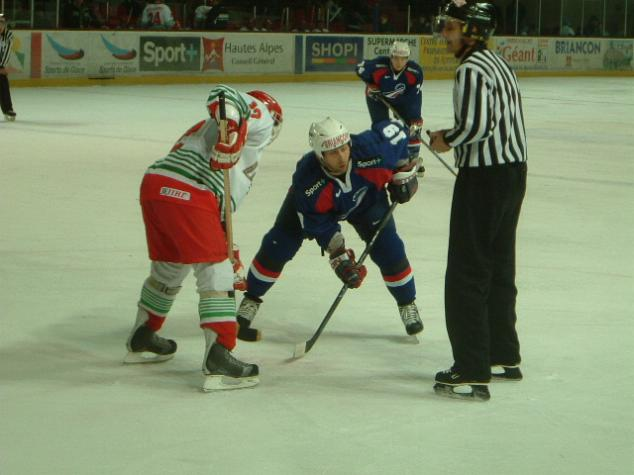
- Olivier Coqueux, French hockey player.
- Born: November 29, 1973 (age 51); Saumur, France
- Height: 5 ft 9 in (175 cm)
- Weight: 181 lb (82 kg; 12 st 13 lb)
- Position: Forward
- Shot: Right
- Played for: Tucson Gila Monsters (WCHL); Edinburgh Capitals (BNL); EHC Freiburg (DEL); Scorpions de Mulhouse (Ligue Magnus); Dragons de Rouen (Ligue Magnus); EfB Ishockey (Denmark)
- National team: France
- NHL draft: Undrafted
- Playing career: 1997–2009

Olivier Coqueux (born November 29, 1973) is a French former professional ice hockey player.

Coqueux competed in the 2004 and 2008 IIHF World Championship as a member of the France men's national ice hockey team.

== Awards and honours ==
Honours	Year
Ligue Magnus All-Star Team	2004–05
