= EHC Klostersee =

- City: Grafing, Germany
- League: Oberliga
- Founded: 1957
- Home arena: Eissporthalle Grafing
- Colours: Red, White, Black

EHC Klostersee is an ice hockey team in Grafing, Germany. They play in the Oberliga, the third level of professional ice hockey in Germany. The club was founded in 1957.
