= 2011 IIHF World Championship rosters =

List of players in a hockey championship

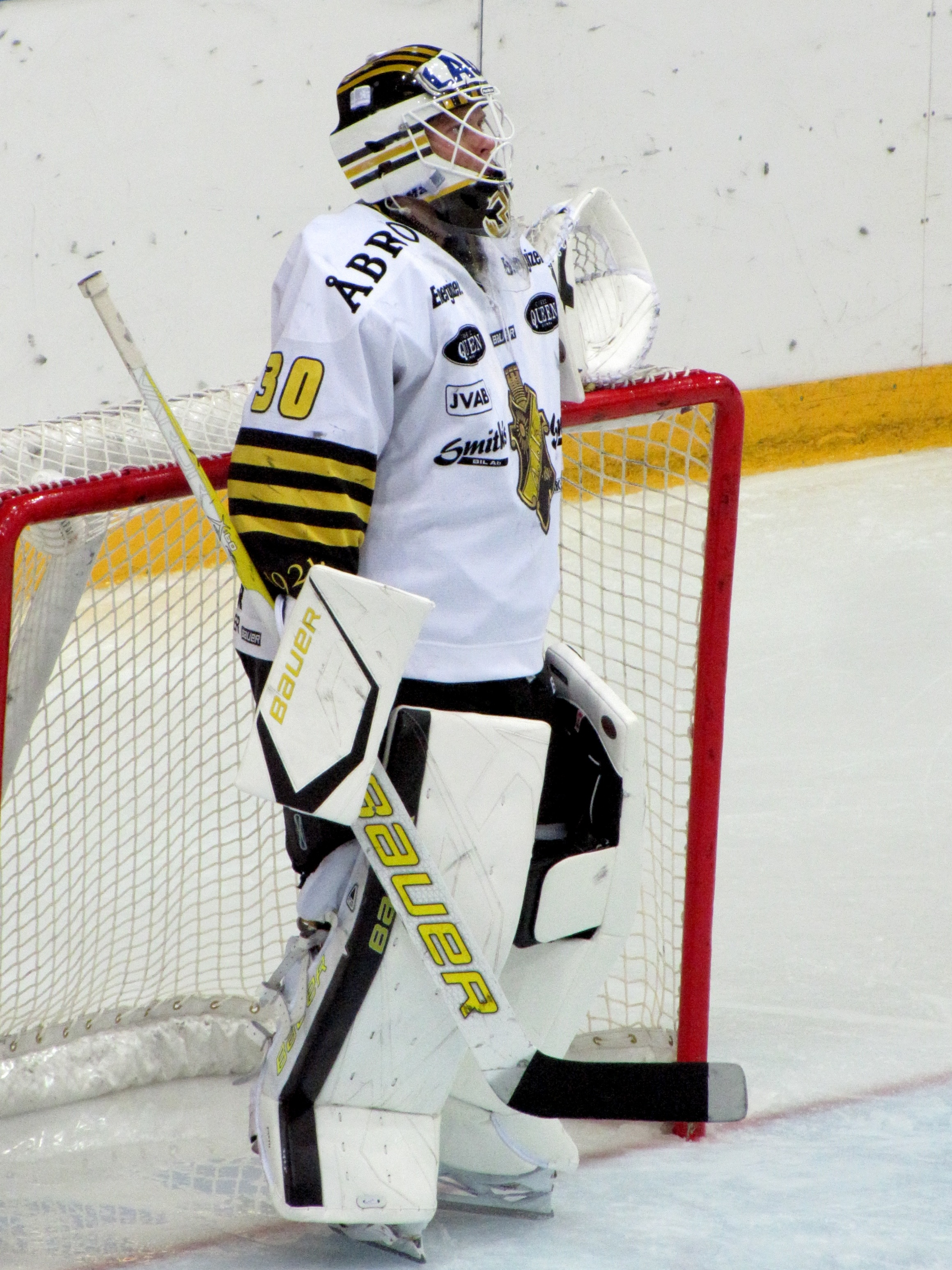
Viktor Fasth of Sweden was named the tournament's most valuable player as well as top goaltender.

The 2011 IIHF World Championship rosters consisted of 397 players from 16 national ice hockey teams. Organised by the International Ice Hockey Federation (IIHF), the 2011 IIHF World Championship, held in Bratislava and Košice, Slovakia, was the 75th edition of the tournament. Finland won the tournament for the second time defeating Sweden 6–1 in the final.

Before the start of the tournament, each participating nation had to submit a list of players for its roster. A minimum of 15 skaters and two goaltenders and a maximum of 20 skaters and three goaltenders had to be selected. After the start of the tournament, each team was allowed to add additional players to their roster, for a maximum of 25. Once players were registered to the team, they could not be removed from the roster.

To have qualified for the national team under IIHF rules, a player must have met several criteria. He must be a citizen of the nation, and be under the jurisdiction of that national association. Players are allowed to change which national team they represent, providing they fulfill the IIHF criteria. If participating for the first time in an IIHF event, the player was required to have played two consecutive years in the national competition of the new country without playing in another country. If the player has already played for a national team before, he may switch countries if he is a citizen of the new country, and has played for four consecutive years in the national competition of the new country. This switch may happen only once in the player's life.

Viktor Fasth of Sweden was named the tournament's most valuable player and top goaltender by the IIHF directorate. Canadian Alex Pietrangelo was named the top defenceman and Jaromír Jágr of the Czech Republic was selected as the top forward. Finland's Jarkko Immonen was the tournament's leading scorer with 12 points and Petri Vehanen was the leading goaltender with a save percentage of 0.954.

== Legend ==
Number	Uniform number	GP	Games played	W	Wins
F	Forward	G	Goals	L	Losses
D	Defenceman	A	Assists	Min	Minutes played
GK	Goaltender	Pts	Points	GA	Goals against
Club	Player's club before tournament	PIM	Penalties in minutes	GAA	Goals against average
		SO	Shutouts	SV%	Save percentage

== Austria ==
- Head coach: Bill Gilligan (USA)

=== Skaters ===
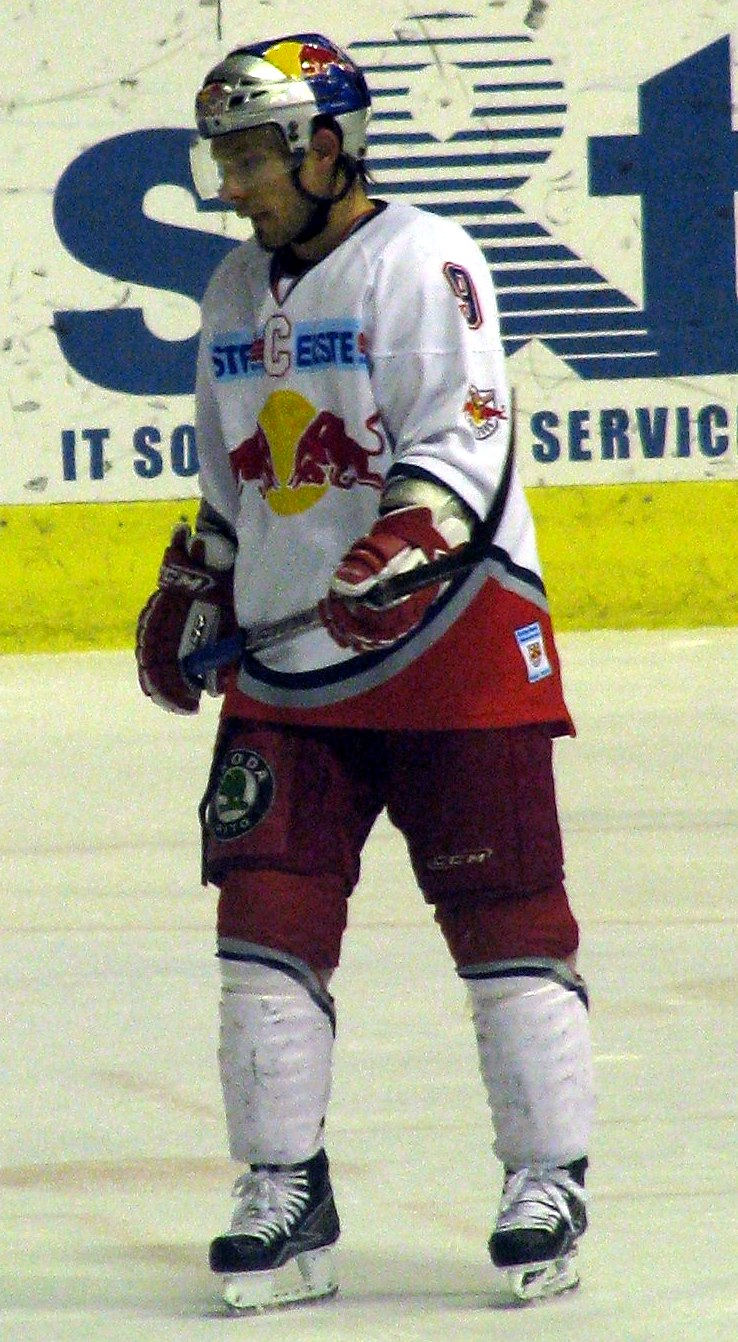
With two assists in six games, Thomas Koch tied for second amongst his team in scoring.

Number	Position	Player	Club	GP	G	A	Pts	PIM
41	F	Mario Altmann	EC VSV	6	0	0	0	0
16	F	Patrick Harand	Graz 99ers	6	0	0	0	10
77	F	Thomas Hundertpfund	EC KAC	6	0	1	1	0
8	F	Roland Kaspitz	EC VSV	6	0	0	0	8
18	F	Thomas Koch	EC Red Bull Salzburg	6	0	2	2	2
11	D	Philippe Lakos	Vienna Capitals	6	0	0	0	33
15	F	Manuel Latusa	EC Red Bull Salzburg	4	0	0	0	4
19	F	Philipp Lukas	EHC Black Wings Linz	6	0	1	1	6
55	D	Robert Lukas	EHC Black Wings Linz	6	0	1	1	2
34	F	Markus Peintner	Graz 99ers	3	0	1	1	2
36	F	Marco Pewal	EC Red Bull Salzburg	1	1	0	1	0
12	F	Michael Raffl	EC VSV	3	0	1	1	0
5	F	Thomas Raffl	EC Red Bull Salzburg	6	2	2	4	2
17	D	Johannes Reichel	EC KAC	6	0	0	0	2
6	F	Rafael Rotter	Vienna Capitals	6	1	1	2	2
13	F	Michael Schiechl	EC Red Bull Salzburg	3	1	0	1	0
28	D	Martin Schumnig	EC KAC	6	0	0	0	0
91	F	Oliver Setzinger	Lausanne HC	6	1	0	1	2
51	D	Matthias Trattnig	EC Red Bull Salzburg	6	0	1	1	10
4	D	Gerhard Unterluggauer	EC VSV	6	1	0	1	2
20	F	Daniel Welser	EC Red Bull Salzburg	6	0	0	0	2
24	D	Darcy Werenka	Graz 99ers	6	0	1	1	6

=== Goaltenders ===
Number	Player	Club	GP	W	L	Min	GA	GAA	SV%	SO
29	Juergen Penker	Vienna Capitals	3	0	3	140	13	5.57	0.822	0
30	Rene Swette	EC KAC	0	–	–	–	–	–	–	–
31	Fabian Weinhandl	Graz 99ers	4	1	2	220	13	3.55	0.897	0

== Belarus ==
- Head coach: Eduard Zankovets (BLR)

=== Skaters ===
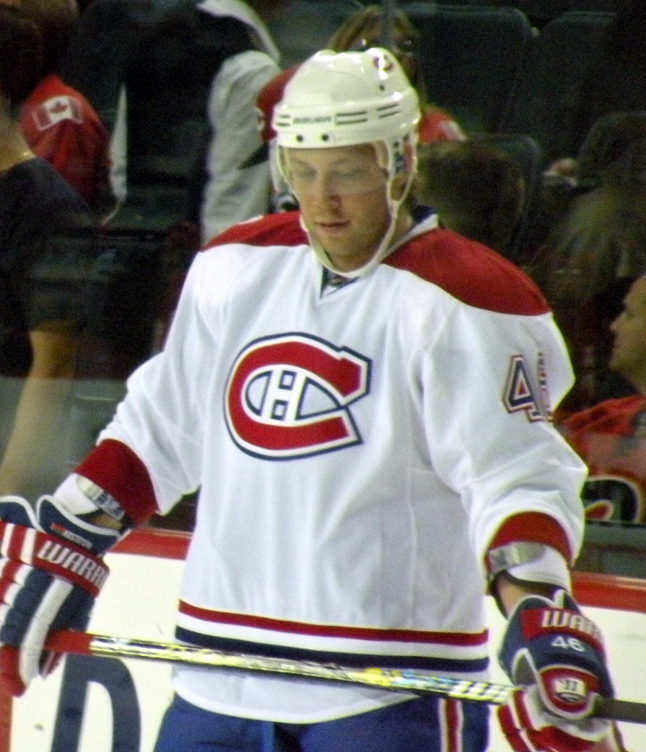
Andrei Kostitsyn recorded three goals and four assists, finishing first in team scoring.

Number	Position	Player	Club	GP	G	A	Pts	PIM
59	F	Sergei Demagin	HC Dinamo Minsk	6	3	0	3	4
17	F	Artem Demkov	HC Shakhtyor Soligorsk	3	1	2	3	0
7	D	Vladimir Denisov	HC Ambrì-Piotta	4	0	1	1	4
13	F	Sergei Drozd	HC Dinamo Minsk	4	0	0	0	2
22	D	Oleg Goroshko	HK Neman Grodno	6	0	1	1	0
91	D	Kirill Gotovets	Cornell University	3	0	0	0	2
84	F	Mikhail Grabovski	Toronto Maple Leafs	6	2	2	4	2
77	F	Alexander Kitarov	Yunost Minsk	6	0	3	3	4
25	D	Sergei Kolosov	Grand Rapids Griffins	6	0	0	0	4
89	D	Dmitri Korobov	HC Dinamo Minsk	6	2	3	5	0
23	F	Andrei Kostitsyn	Montreal Canadiens	5	3	4	7	4
43	D	Viktor Kostyuchenok	HC Dinamo Minsk	6	1	1	2	8
88	F	Evgeni Kovyrshin	HC Shakhtyor Soligorsk	6	1	3	4	4
11	F	Alexander Kulakov	HC Dinamo Minsk	6	1	5	6	2
19	F	Dmitry Meleshko	HC Dinamo Minsk	6	1	3	4	6
10	F	Andrei Mikhalev	HC Dinamo Minsk	6	3	1	4	6
81	F	Alexander Pavlovich	HC Shakhtyor Soligorsk	5	0	0	0	0
52	D	Alexander Ryadinsky	Yunost Minsk	5	0	0	0	4
26	F	Andrei Stas	HC Dinamo Minsk	6	0	0	0	0
5	D	Nikolai Stasenko	Amur Khabarovsk	6	0	1	1	0
61	F	Andrei Stepanov	Yunost Minsk	6	2	3	5	0
18	F	Alexei Ugarov	UHC Dynamo	6	0	1	1	2

=== Goaltenders ===
Number	Player	Club	GP	W	L	Min	GA	GAA	SV%	SO
31	Andrei Mezin	HC Dinamo Minsk	6	2	4	360	19	3.16	0.893	0
40	Dmitri Milchakov	Metallurg Zhlobin	0	–	–	–	–	–	–	–
2	Sergei Shabanov	HK Neman Grodno	0	–	–	–	–	–	–	–

== Canada ==
- Head coach: Ken Hitchcock (CAN)

=== Skaters ===
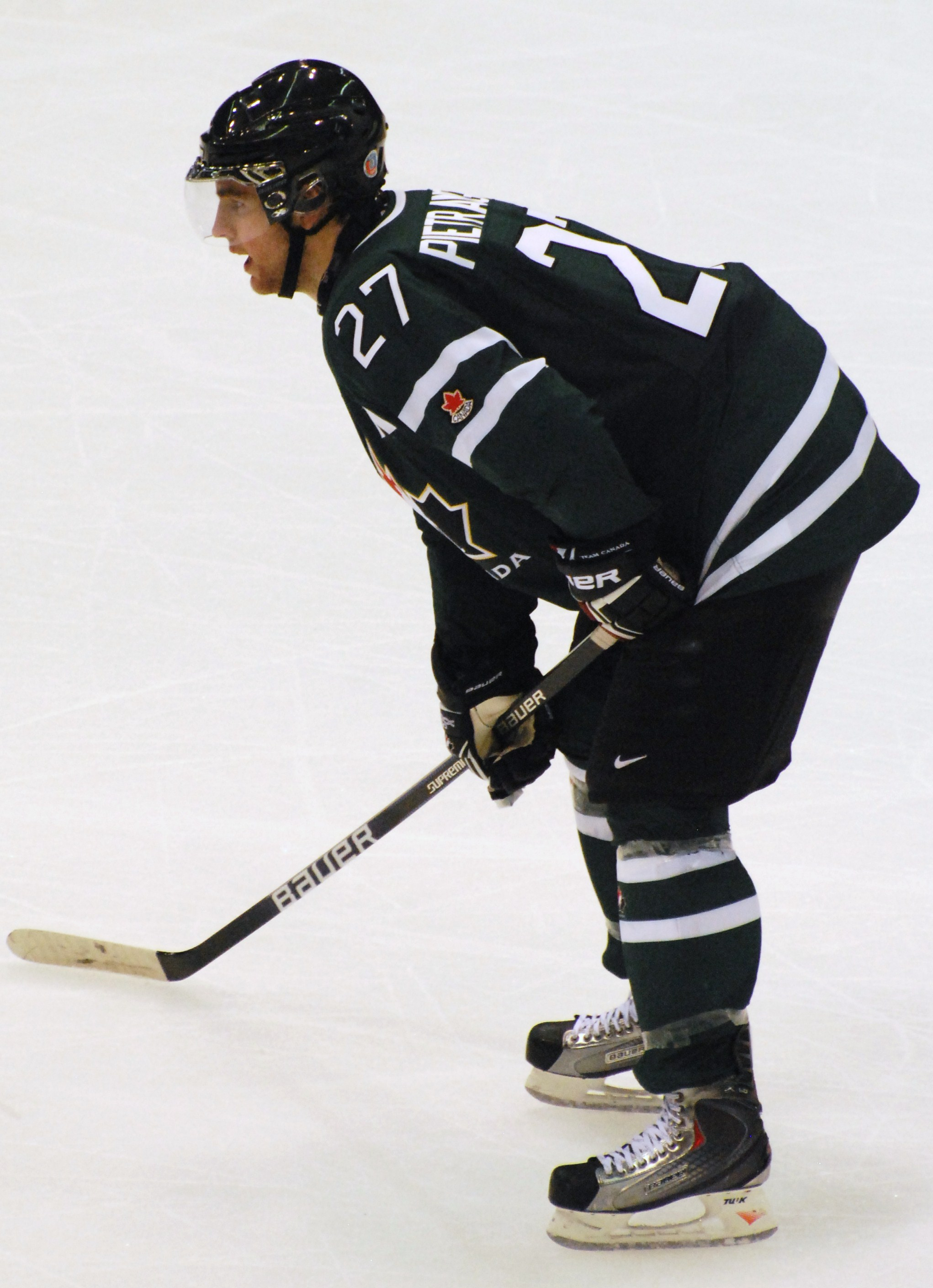
Alex Pietrangelo was named the tournament's best defenceman.

Number	Position	Player	Club	GP	G	A	Pts	PIM
8	D	Brent Burns	Minnesota Wild	7	2	2	4	8
22	F	Cal Clutterbuck	Minnesota Wild	7	0	1	1	4
28	D	Carlo Colaiacovo	St. Louis Blues	5	0	0	0	0
92	F	Matt Duchene	Colorado Avalanche	7	0	0	0	2
14	F	Jordan Eberle	Edmonton Oilers	7	4	0	4	2
17	D	Marc-André Gragnani	Buffalo Sabres	6	1	1	2	2
9	F	Evander Kane	Atlanta Thrashers	7	0	2	2	4
16	F	Andrew Ladd	Atlanta Thrashers	7	0	0	0	2
33	D	Marc Methot	Columbus Blue Jackets	7	0	0	0	2
61	F	Rick Nash	Columbus Blue Jackets	7	2	3	5	2
18	F	James Neal	Pittsburgh Penguins	6	2	3	5	10
3	D	Dion Phaneuf	Toronto Maple Leafs	7	0	3	3	8
27	D	Alex Pietrangelo	St. Louis Blues	7	2	3	5	2
7	D	Mario Scalzo	Adler Mannheim	3	0	2	2	0
2	D	Luke Schenn	Toronto Maple Leafs	7	0	1	1	0
53	F	Jeff Skinner	Carolina Hurricanes	7	3	3	6	8
19	F	Jason Spezza	Ottawa Senators	7	4	3	7	4
25	F	Chris Stewart	St. Louis Blues	7	2	2	4	0
20	F	John Tavares	New York Islanders	7	5	4	9	12
50	F	Antoine Vermette	Columbus Blue Jackets	4	0	0	0	0
15	F	Travis Zajac	New Jersey Devils	7	1	2	3	2

=== Goaltenders ===
Number	Player	Club	GP	W	L	Min	GA	GAA	SV%	SO
45	Jonathan Bernier	Los Angeles Kings	3	2	1	179	6	2.01	0.917	0
40	Devan Dubnyk	Edmonton Oilers	1	0	0	14	0	0.00	1.000	0
34	James Reimer	Toronto Maple Leafs	4	3	0	235	8	2.04	0.920	0

== Czech Republic ==
- Head coach: Alois Hadamczik (CZE)

=== Skaters ===
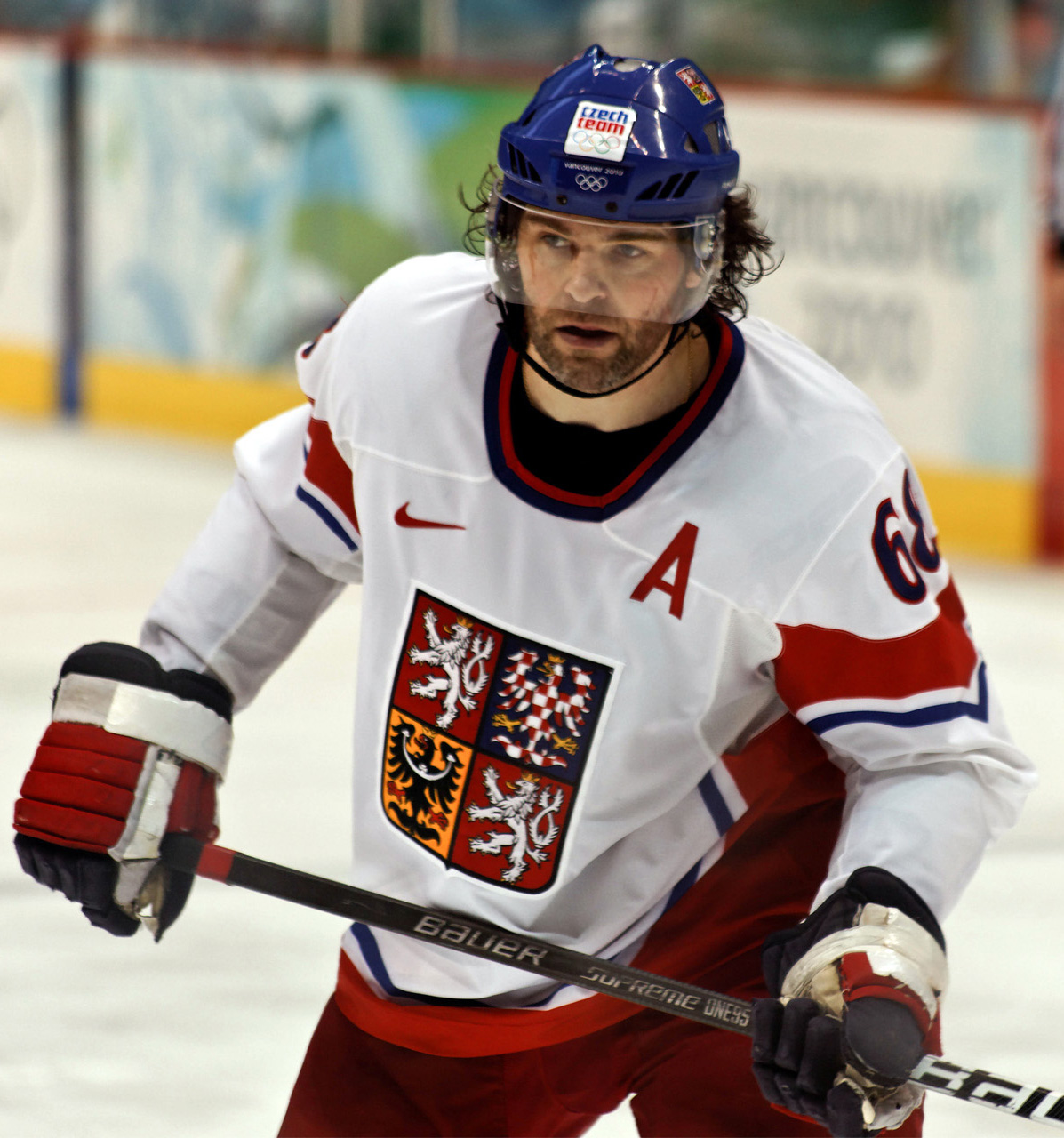
Jaromír Jágr was named the tournament's best forward.

Number	Position	Player	Club	GP	G	A	Pts	PIM
36	D	Petr Čáslava	HC CSKA Moscow	9	0	1	1	8
10	F	Roman Červenka	Avangard Omsk	9	4	6	10	4
26	F	Patrik Eliáš	New Jersey Devils	9	4	5	9	4
18	F	Michael Frolík	Chicago Blackhawks	9	3	2	5	0
24	F	Martin Havlát	Minnesota Wild	6	2	4	6	4
11	F	Petr Hubáček	HC Kometa Brno	9	0	2	2	2
68	F	Jaromír Jágr	Avangard Omsk	9	5	4	9	4
25	D	Lukáš Krajíček	HC Oceláři Třinec	8	0	1	1	8
15	F	Jan Marek	Atlant Moscow Oblast	9	1	2	3	14
7	D	Radek Martínek	New York Islanders	1	0	0	0	0
9	F	Milan Michálek	Ottawa Senators	8	4	2	6	6
2	D	Zbyněk Michálek	Pittsburgh Penguins	8	0	1	1	0
63	D	Ondřej Němec	Severstal Cherepovets	6	0	0	0	0
12	F	Jiří Novotný	Barys Astana	9	0	2	2	0
82	F	Tomáš Plekanec	Montreal Canadiens	8	6	4	10	6
73	F	Petr Průcha	SKA Saint Petersburg	9	3	2	5	2
4	D	Karel Rachůnek	Lokomotiv Yaroslavl	9	1	2	3	6
60	F	Tomáš Rolinek	Metallurg Magnitogorsk	9	1	2	3	6
41	D	Martin Škoula	Avangard Omsk	9	0	2	2	4
14	F	Petr Vampola	Avangard Omsk	3	0	0	0	0
93	F	Jakub Voráček	Columbus Blue Jackets	9	1	2	3	2
3	D	Marek Židlický	Minnesota Wild	9	1	4	5	6

=== Goaltenders ===
Number	Player	Club	GP	W	L	Min	GA	GAA	SV%	SO
1	Jakub Kovář	Motor České Budějovice	0	–	–	–	–	–	–	–
31	Ondřej Pavelec	Atlanta Thrashers	8	6	1	479	15	1.88	0.939	2
33	Jakub Štěpánek	SKA Saint Petersburg	1	1	0	60	2	2.00	0.952	0

== Denmark ==
- Head coach: Per Bäckman (SWE)

=== Skaters ===
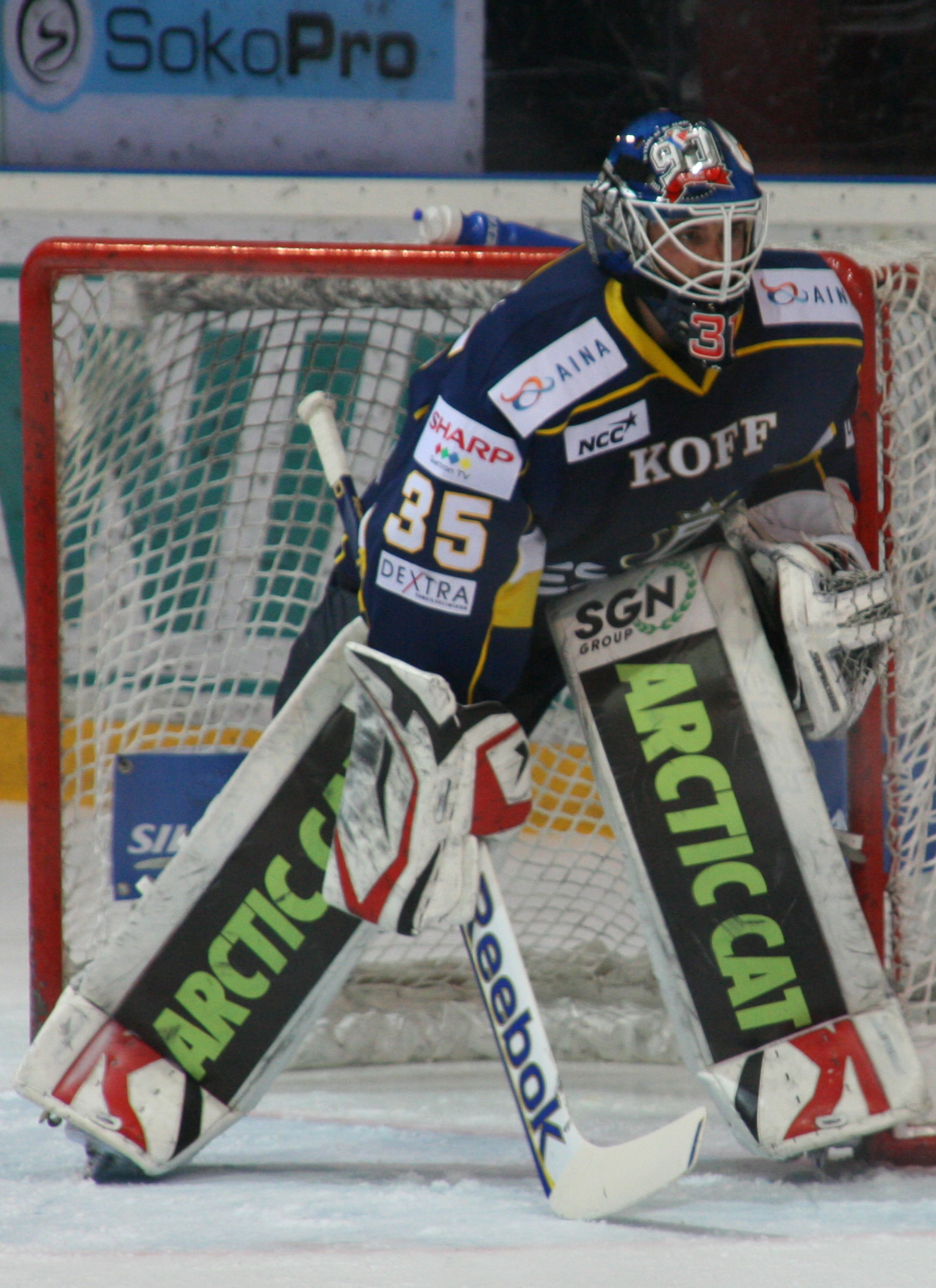
Patrick Galbraith conceded ten goals and finished with a save percentage of 0.872.

Number	Position	Player	Club	GP	G	A	Pts	PIM
4	D	Mads Bødker	Rögle BK	6	1	1	2	0
89	F	Mikkel Bødker	Phoenix Coyotes	6	3	1	4	2
60	F	Mads Christensen	Eisbären Berlin	6	4	1	5	6
9	F	Kasper Degn	AaB Ishockey	6	0	0	0	2
21	F	Thor Dresler	Hvidovre Ligahockey	6	0	0	0	4
26	D	Michael Eskesen	Odense Bulldogs	6	0	0	0	0
13	F	Morten Green	Malmö Redhawks	5	0	2	2	0
44	F	Nichlas Hardt	Malmö Redhawks	6	4	1	5	2
84	D	Philip Hersby	Hvidovre Ligahockey	6	0	1	1	2
33	F	Julian Jakobsen	Södertälje SK	6	0	5	5	4
40	F	Jesper Jensen	Frederikshavn White Hawks	6	0	0	0	4
41	D	Jesper Jensen	Rögle BK	6	0	0	0	4
18	D	Kasper Jensen	Rødovre Mighty Bulls	6	0	1	1	2
6	D	Stefan Lassen	Djurgårdens IF Hockey	6	0	1	1	8
29	F	Morten Madsen	Modo Hockey	6	0	1	1	2
5	D	Daniel Nielsen	Herning Blue Fox	6	0	1	1	8
38	F	Morten Poulsen	Herning Blue Fox	6	0	0	0	0
19	F	Kim Staal	Herning Blue Fox	6	0	0	0	0
14	F	Kirill Starkov	EfB Ishockey	6	0	2	2	2
8	F	Frederik Storm	SønderjyskE Ishockey	6	0	0	0	0

=== Goaltenders ===
Number	Player	Club	GP	W	L	Min	GA	GAA	SV%	SO
30	Frederik Andersen	Frederikshavn White Hawks	4	0	2	245	14	3.41	0.910	0
1	Patrick Galbraith	Leksands IF	2	0	2	120	10	5.00	0.872	0
31	Simon Nielsen	AaB Ishockey	0	–	–	–	–	–	–	–

== Finland ==
- Head coach: Jukka Jalonen (FIN)

=== Skaters ===
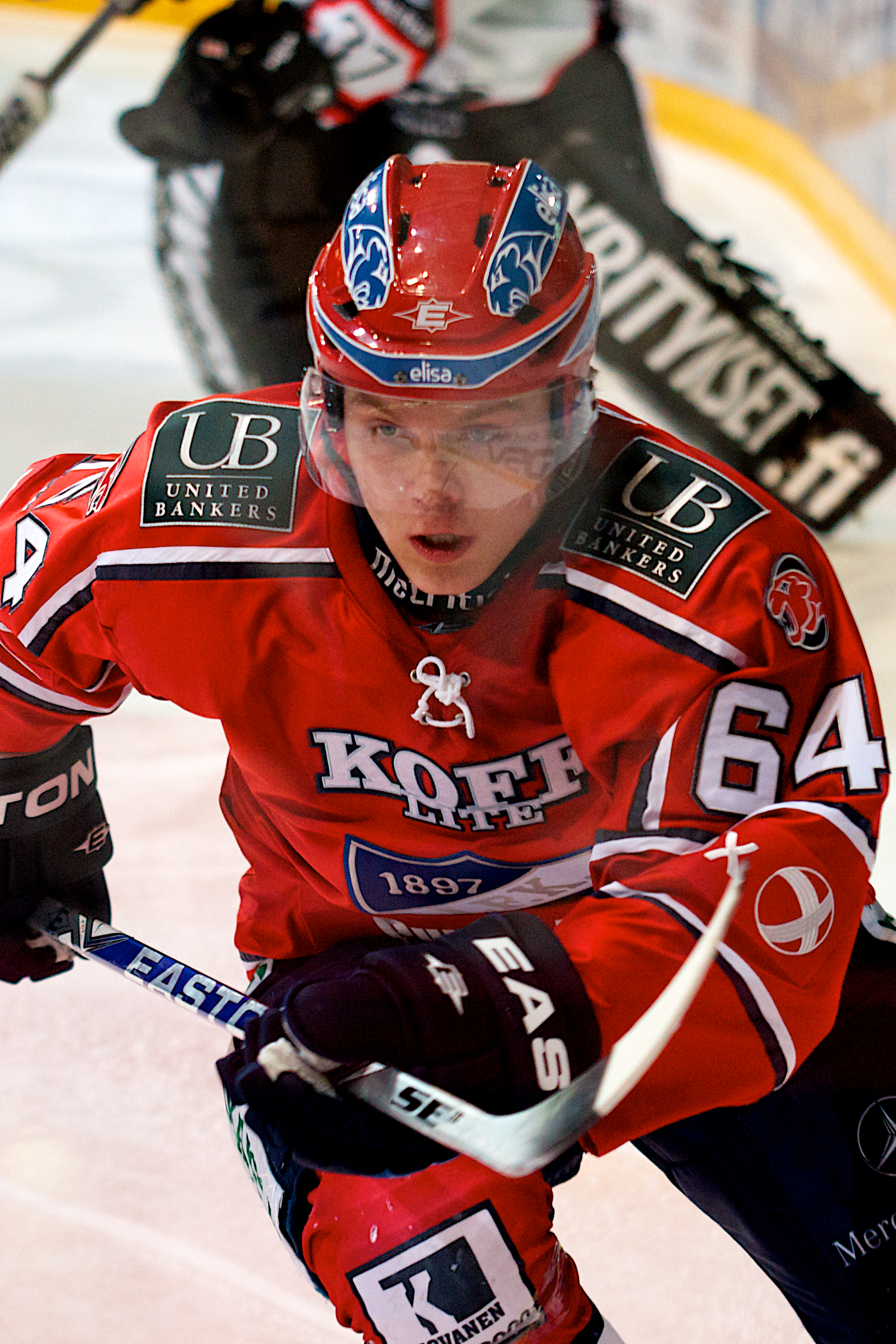
Mikael Granlund played nine games for the Finnish team, scoring two goals and seven assists.

Number	Position	Player	Club	GP	G	A	Pts	PIM
50	F	Juhamatti Aaltonen	Metallurg Magnitogorsk	9	1	2	3	6
64	F	Mikael Granlund	HIFK	9	2	7	9	2
26	F	Jarkko Immonen	Ak Bars Kazan	9	9	3	12	2
6	D	Topi Jaakola	Luleå HF	9	0	1	1	6
58	F	Jesse Joensuu	New York Islanders	0	–	–	–	–
39	F	Niko Kapanen	Ak Bars Kazan	9	2	1	3	2
9	F	Mikko Koivu	Minnesota Wild	9	2	6	8	4
71	F	Leo Komarov	UHC Dynamo	8	0	2	2	2
5	D	Lasse Kukkonen	Metallurg Magnitogorsk	9	0	0	0	0
47	F	Janne Lahti	Jokerit	5	0	0	0	0
24	F	Jani Lajunen	Espoo Blues	4	2	1	3	2
18	D	Sami Lepistö	Columbus Blue Jackets	9	0	3	3	6
21	D	Janne Niskala	Metallurg Magnitogorsk	9	1	3	4	4
29	F	Petteri Nokelainen	Jokerit	9	1	1	2	8
20	F	Janne Pesonen	Ak Bars Kazan	9	2	5	7	4
40	F	Antti Pihlström	JYP Jyväskylä	9	2	1	3	0
41	D	Pasi Puistola	HV71	9	0	3	3	4
37	F	Mika Pyörälä	Frölunda HC	9	1	2	3	4
15	F	Tuomo Ruutu	Carolina Hurricanes	9	6	0	6	8
28	D	Anssi Salmela	New Jersey Devils	9	1	2	3	4
4	D	Ossi Väänänen	Jokerit	9	0	0	0	4
19	D	Jyrki Välivaara	JYP Jyväskylä	9	0	3	3	8

=== Goaltenders ===
Number	Player	Club	GP	W	L	Min	GA	GAA	SV%	SO
33	Niko Hovinen	Lahti Pelicans	0	–	–	–	–	–	–	–
35	Teemu Lassila	HPK	3	0	0	164	6	2.19	0.913	0
31	Petri Vehanen	Ak Bars Kazan	8	5	1	388	8	1.24	0.954	1

== France ==
- Head coach: David Henderson (FRA)

=== Skaters ===
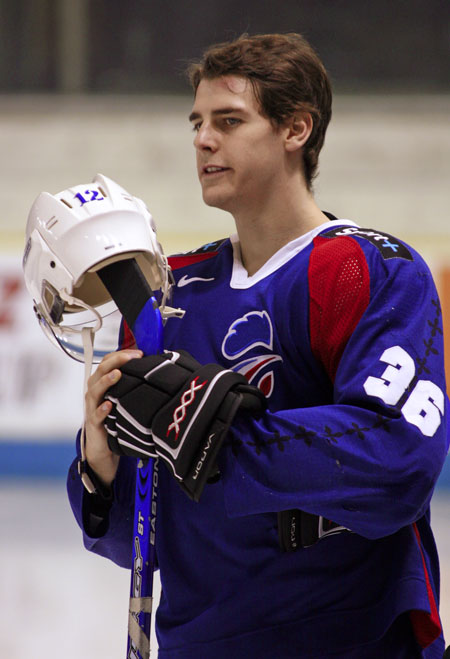
Kevin Hecquefeuille recorded one goal and three assists to tie for first in team scoring.

Number	Position	Player	Club	GP	G	A	Pts	PIM
23	F	Nicolas Arrossamena	Brûleurs de Loups	5	0	0	0	2
18	D	Yohann Auvitu	JYP Jyväskylä	6	0	1	1	2
3	D	Vincent Bachet	Gothiques d'Amiens	6	0	0	0	10
41	F	Pierre-Édouard Bellemare	Skellefteå AIK	6	1	1	2	2
74	D	Nicolas Besch	Mikkelin Jukurit	6	0	0	0	10
14	F	Stéphane Da Costa	Ottawa Senators	5	0	1	1	6
80	F	Teddy Da Costa	Dragons de Rouen	6	0	0	0	10
24	F	Julien Desrosiers	Dragons de Rouen	5	0	1	1	2
9	F	Damien Fleury	VIK Västerås HK	6	1	0	1	2
28	F	Laurent Gras	Chamonix HC	6	0	0	0	4
84	D	Kevin Hecquefeuille	Gothiques d'Amiens	6	1	3	4	4
22	F	Brian Henderson	Ducs d'Angers	6	0	0	0	2
21	D	Jonathan Janil	Dragons de Rouen	6	0	0	0	0
19	F	Loïc Lampérier	Diables Rouges de Briançon	3	0	0	0	0
10	F	Laurent Meunier	Straubing Tigers	6	2	1	3	8
20	D	Maxime Moisand	Brûleurs de Loups	4	0	0	0	0
82	F	Damien Raux	Diables Rouges de Briançon	6	0	1	1	4
17	F	Jérémie Romand	Drakkars de Caen	6	0	0	0	4
38	D	Thomas Roussel	Gothiques d'Amiens	6	0	0	0	6
13	F	Luc Tardif	Dragons de Rouen	6	0	0	0	8
87	D	Teddy Trabichet	Gothiques d'Amiens	2	0	0	0	0
77	F	Sacha Treille	HC Sparta Praha	6	2	2	4	16

=== Goaltenders ===
Number	Player	Club	GP	W	L	Min	GA	GAA	SV%	SO
39	Cristobal Huet	HC Fribourg-Gottéron	6	1	5	281	16	3.41	0.913	0
42	Fabrice Lhenry	Dragons de Rouen	2	0	0	80	7	5.25	0.887	0
33	Ronan Quemener	Rapaces de Gap	0	–	–	–	–	–	–	–

== Germany ==
- Head coach: Uwe Krupp (GER)

=== Skaters ===
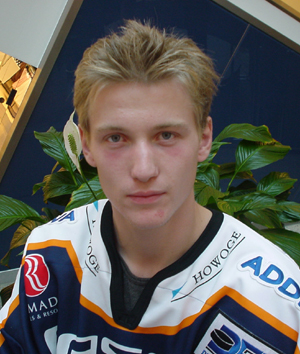
Frank Hördler played seven games, recording two goals and two assists, tying for second among his team in scoring.

Number	Position	Player	Club	GP	G	A	Pts	PIM
29	F	Alexander Barta	Hamburg Freezers	7	2	1	3	0
90	D	Constantin Braun	Eisbären Berlin	7	0	2	2	4
20	D	Robert Dietrich	Adler Mannheim	7	0	0	0	0
77	F	Nikolai Goc	Adler Mannheim	6	0	1	1	4
87	F	Philip Gogulla	Kölner Haie	7	0	2	2	4
39	F	Thomas Greilinger	ERC Ingolstadt	5	2	1	3	2
5	D	Korbinian Holzer	Toronto Marlies	7	0	1	1	10
48	F	Frank Hördler	Eisbären Berlin	7	2	2	4	0
18	F	Kai Hospelt	Grizzly Adams Wolfsburg	7	1	2	3	4
75	F	Marcus Kink	Adler Mannheim	3	0	2	2	4
26	F	Daniel Kreutzer	DEG Metro Stars	5	0	0	0	2
3	D	Justin Krueger	SC Bern	7	0	1	1	8
27	D	Kevin Lavallee	EHC München	7	1	3	4	4
28	D	Frank Mauer	Adler Mannheim	5	0	3	3	0
25	F	Marcel Müller	Toronto Marlies	7	1	4	5	6
24	F	André Rankel	Eisbären Berlin	7	1	2	3	2
37	F	Patrick Reimer	DEG Metro Stars	7	2	1	3	4
2	D	Denis Reul	Adler Mannheim	3	0	0	0	2
55	F	Felix Schütz	ERC Ingolstadt	7	3	1	4	4
21	F	John Tripp	Kölner Haie	7	3	1	4	4
47	F	Christoph Ullmann	Kölner Haie	7	0	3	3	4
16	F	Michael Wolf	Iserlohn Roosters	7	2	1	3	0

=== Goaltenders ===
Number	Player	Club	GP	W	L	Min	GA	GAA	SV%	SO
44	Dennis Endras	Augsburger Panther	6	1	4	375	21	3.36	0.893	1
32	Dimitri Pätzold	Straubing Tigers	1	1	0	60	3	3.00	0.921	0
30	Jochen Reimer	Grizzly Adams Wolfsburg	0	–	–	–	–	–	–	–

== Latvia ==
- Head coach: Oļegs Znaroks (GER)

=== Skaters ===
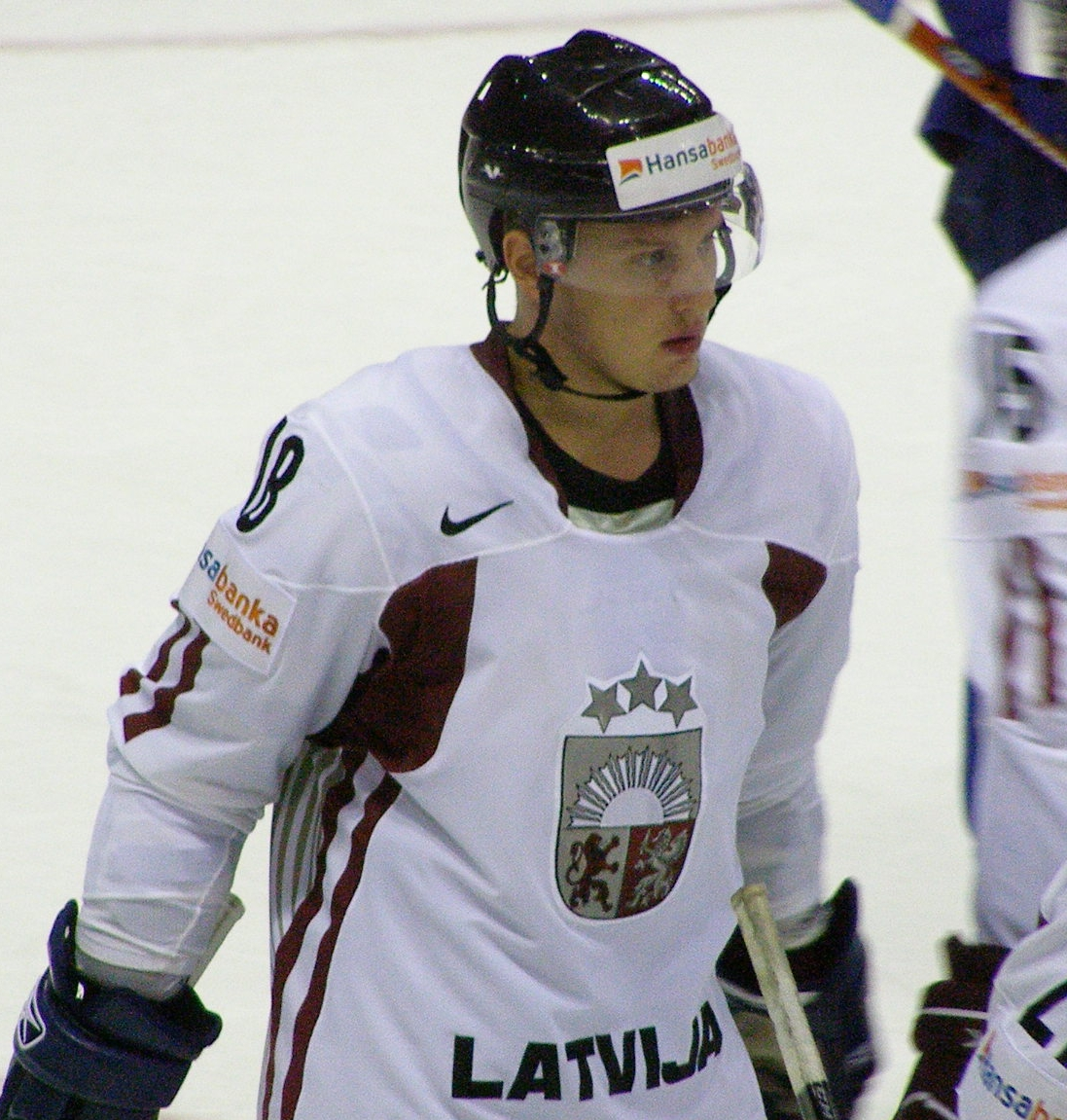
Georgijs Pujacs led the Latvian team in penalties with 33 PIM.

Number	Position	Player	Club	GP	G	A	Pts	PIM
5	D	Jānis Andersons	Dinamo Riga	3	0	1	1	4
75	F	Ģirts Ankipāns	Dinamo Riga	6	0	0	0	2
21	F	Armands Bērziņš	HPK	6	0	2	2	4
9	F	Roberts Bukarts	Dinamo Riga	6	3	0	3	2
44	D	Oskars Cibuļskis	Dinamo Riga	6	0	1	1	0
47	F	Mārtiņš Cipulis	Amur Khabarovsk	6	4	2	6	2
10	F	Lauris Dārziņš	Dinamo Riga	3	1	0	1	4
23	F	Andris Džeriņš	Dinamo Riga	6	0	5	5	2
15	F	Ronalds Ķēniņš	GCK Lions	6	0	0	0	0
32	D	Artūrs Kulda	Chicago Wolves	3	0	0	0	6
87	F	Gints Meija	Dinamo Riga	6	0	3	3	4
17	F	Aleksandrs Ņiživijs	Dinamo Riga	6	1	4	5	4
27	F	Sergejs Pečura	PHC Krylya Sovetov	6	0	0	0	2
81	D	Georgijs Pujacs	HC Sibir Novosibirsk	6	2	1	3	33
25	D	Jēkabs Rēdlihs	Dinamo Riga	6	1	1	2	4
26	D	Krišjānis Rēdlihs	Dinamo Riga	4	1	0	1	2
24	F	Miķelis Rēdlihs	Dinamo Riga	6	1	6	7	4
3	D	Arvīds Reķis	Dinamo Riga	6	0	2	2	10
18	F	Kaspars Saulietis	HPK	6	3	1	4	2
11	D	Kristaps Sotnieks	Dinamo Riga	6	0	4	4	6
6	F	Juris Štāls	Dinamo Riga	3	0	0	0	0
12	F	Herberts Vasiļjevs	Krefeld Pinguine	6	1	1	2	6

=== Goaltenders ===
Number	Player	Club	GP	W	L	Min	GA	GAA	SV%	SO
1	Māris Jučers	HK Liepājas Metalurgs	0	–	–	–	–	–	–	–
31	Edgars Masaļskis	Yugra Khanty-Mansiysk	6	2	4	351	19	3.24	0.905	0
30	Mārtiņš Raitums	HK Beibarys Atyrau	1	0	0	18	0	0.00	1.000	0

== Norway ==
- Head coach: Roy Johansen (NOR)

=== Skaters ===
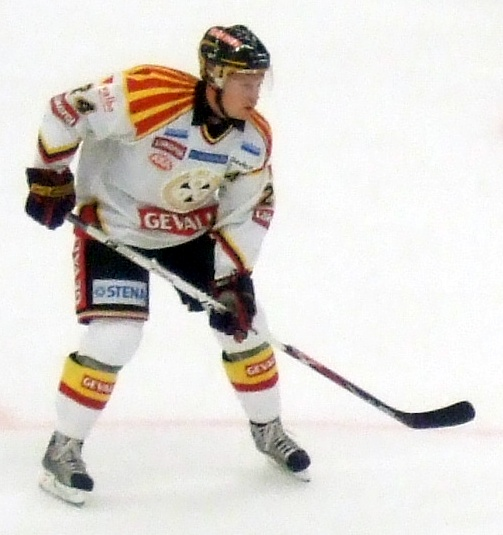
Mads Hansen played seven games for the Norwegian team, recording one assist.

Number	Position	Player	Club	GP	G	A	Pts	PIM
21	F	Morten Ask	Vålerenga Ishockey	7	1	3	4	10
20	F	Anders Bastiansen	Färjestad BK	7	3	4	7	4
47	D	Alexander Bonsaksen	IF Sundsvall Hockey	7	0	2	2	6
44	D	Brede Frettem Csiszar	Vålerenga Ishockey	7	0	0	0	0
3	D	Erik Follestad Johansen	Frisk Asker Ishockey	4	0	0	0	0
26	F	Kristian Forsberg	Modo Hockey	7	1	0	1	2
52	F	Anders Fredriksen	Lørenskog IK	7	0	0	0	0
8	F	Mads Hansen	Brynäs IF	7	0	1	1	16
6	D	Jonas Holøs	Colorado Avalanche	7	2	3	5	2
9	F	Marius Holtet	Färjestad BK	7	6	2	8	4
5	D	Eerikki Koivu	Lørenskog IK	7	1	0	1	2
15	F	Tommy Kristiansen	Sparta Warriors	3	0	0	0	4
35	F	Martin Laumann Ylven	Linköpings HC	3	0	0	0	0
14	F	Peter Lorentzen	Stavanger Oilers	7	0	0	0	2
24	F	Andreas Martinsen	Lillehammer IK	7	0	0	0	6
40	F	Ken André Olimb	Leksands IF	7	3	1	4	0
46	F	Mathis Olimb	Rockford IceHogs	7	1	8	9	4
37	D	Lars Løkken Østli	Storhamar Dragons	1	0	0	0	0
22	F	Martin Røymark	Timrå IK	7	1	2	3	2
19	F	Per-Åge Skrøder	Modo Hockey	7	3	4	7	10
10	F	Lars Erik Spets	Lørenskog IK	7	1	2	3	2
55	D	Ole-Kristian Tollefsen	Modo Hockey	7	0	1	1	10

=== Goaltenders ===
Number	Player	Club	GP	W	L	Min	GA	GAA	SV%	SO
33	Pål Grotnes	Stjernen Hockey	0	–	–	–	–	–	–	–
30	Lars Haugen	Manglerud Star Ishockey	7	3	3	422	19	2.70	0.926	1
34	Robert Hestmann	Storhamar Dragons	0	–	–	–	–	–	–	–

== Russia ==
- Head coach: Vyacheslav Bykov (RUS)

=== Skaters ===
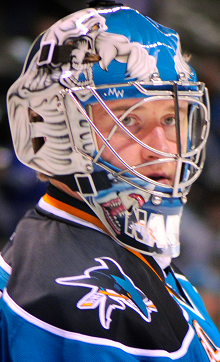
Evgeni Nabokov started four games, winning two.

Number	Position	Player	Club	GP	G	A	Pts	PIM
61	F	Maxim Afinogenov	SKA Saint Petersburg	9	1	2	3	6
49	F	Evgeny Artyukhin	SKA Saint Petersburg	9	2	1	3	24
27	D	Vitaly Atyushov	Metallurg Magnitogorsk	9	1	2	3	4
44	D	Nikolai Belov	HC Neftekhimik Nizhnekamsk	6	0	0	0	4
74	D	Alexei Emelin	Ak Bars Kazan	9	0	0	0	29
21	F	Konstantin Gorovikov	UHC Dynamo	9	0	2	2	2
37	D	Denis Grebeshkov	SKA Saint Petersburg	2	0	0	0	0
55	F	Alexei Kaigorodov	Metallurg Magnitogorsk	8	1	3	4	2
7	D	Dmitri Kalinin	Salavat Yulaev Ufa	9	0	3	3	4
22	D	Konstantin Korneyev	Ak Bars Kazan	9	0	3	3	0
71	F	Ilya Kovalchuk	New Jersey Devils	9	3	5	8	6
41	F	Nikolai Kulemin	Toronto Maple Leafs	9	1	0	1	2
43	D	Dmitri Kulikov	Florida Panthers	9	2	1	3	4
95	F	Aleksey Morozov	Ak Bars Kazan	9	1	3	4	8
5	D	Ilya Nikulin	Ak Bars Kazan	9	3	1	4	2
8	F	Alexander Ovechkin	Washington Capitals	5	0	0	0	4
47	F	Alexander Radulov	Salavat Yulaev Ufa	9	2	5	7	6
91	F	Vladimir Tarasenko	HC Sibir Novosibirsk	6	1	0	1	0
23	F	Alexei Tereshchenko	Ak Bars Kazan	8	1	0	1	2
51	D	Fedor Tyutin	Columbus Blue Jackets	9	0	3	3	0
25	F	Danis Zaripov	Ak Bars Kazan	9	1	5	6	0
42	F	Sergei Zinovjev	Salavat Yulaev Ufa	9	4	3	7	4

=== Goaltenders ===
Number	Player	Club	GP	W	L	Min	GA	GAA	SV%	SO
84	Konstantin Barulin	Atlant Moscow Oblast	7	2	4	342	16	2.80	0.908	0
83	Vasiliy Koshechkin	Severstal Cherepovets	0	–	–	–	–	–	–	–
20	Evgeni Nabokov	New York Islanders	4	2	1	199	12	3.60	0.880	0

== Slovakia ==
- Head coach: Glen Hanlon (CAN)

=== Skaters ===
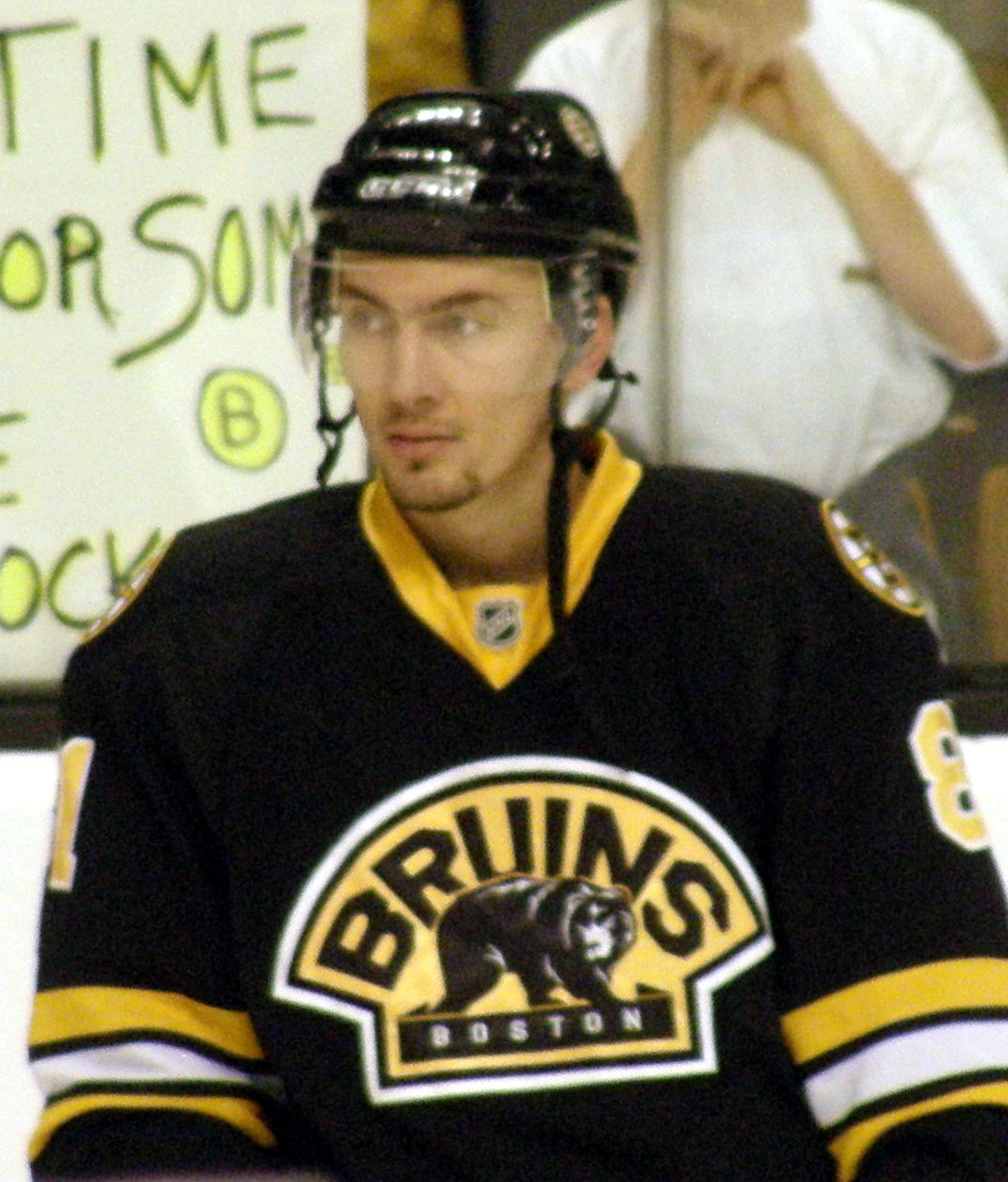
Miroslav Šatan played six games, recording three goals and two assists, tying for first amongst his team in scoring.

Number	Position	Player	Club	GP	G	A	Pts	PIM
7	D	Ivan Baranka	HC Spartak Moscow	6	0	0	0	4
23	F	Ľuboš Bartečko	Modo Hockey	4	1	1	2	8
8	F	Martin Cibák	Severstal Cherepovets	3	0	1	1	2
38	F	Pavol Demitra	Lokomotiv Yaroslavl	6	1	2	3	0
10	F	Marián Gáborík	New York Rangers	6	2	1	3	0
51	D	Dominik Graňák	UHC Dynamo	6	0	1	1	0
26	F	Michal Handzuš	Los Angeles Kings	5	0	2	2	0
88	F	Marcel Hossa	Ak Bars Kazan	6	1	0	1	2
81	F	Marián Hossa	Chicago Blackhawks	5	1	1	2	2
68	D	Milan Jurčina	New York Islanders	6	0	2	2	4
16	D	Ivan Majeský	Skellefteå AIK	6	0	2	2	6
27	F	Ladislav Nagy	Modo Hockey	4	3	2	5	4
37	D	Peter Podhradský	HC Dinamo Minsk	6	0	1	1	0
92	F	Branko Radivojevič	HC Spartak Moscow	6	0	1	1	6
14	F	Štefan Ružička	HC Spartak Moscow	5	0	1	1	2
18	F	Miroslav Šatan	UHC Dynamo	6	3	2	5	4
4	D	Michal Sersen	Avtomobilist Yekaterinburg	1	0	0	0	0
77	D	Martin Štrbák	UHC Dynamo	6	0	0	0	2
15	F	Jozef Stümpel	HC Dinamo Minsk	6	2	1	3	2
43	F	Tomáš Surový	Dinamo Riga	6	1	1	2	2
17	D	Ľubomír Višňovský	Anaheim Ducks	3	0	2	2	0
20	F	Richard Zedník	AIK IF	6	1	1	2	2

=== Goaltenders ===
Number	Player	Club	GP	W	L	Min	GA	GAA	SV%	SO
30	Jaroslav Halák	St. Louis Blues	6	2	4	354	15	2.54	0.909	0
2	Peter Hamerlík	HC Oceláři Třinec	0	–	–	–	–	–	–	–
25	Ján Lašák	Jokerit	0	–	–	–	–	–	–	–

== Slovenia ==
- Head coach: Matjaž Kopitar (SVN)

=== Skaters ===
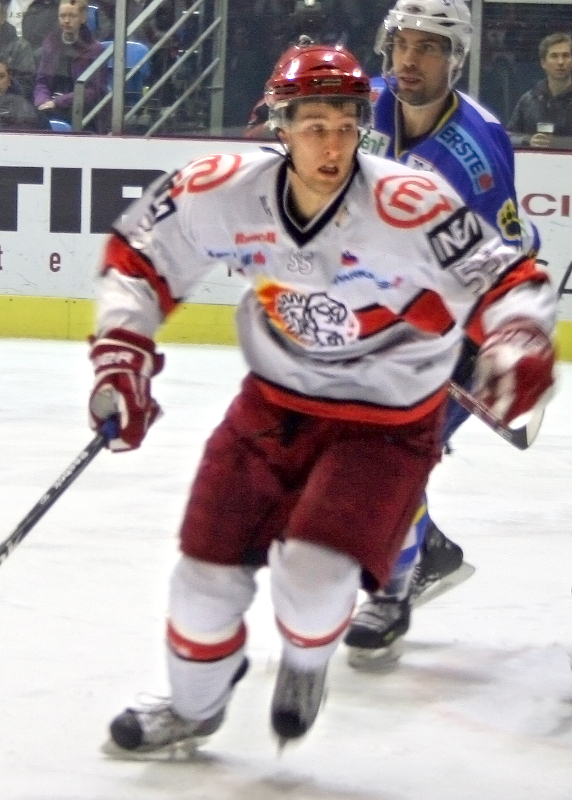
Robert Sabolič recorded one goal and three assists, tying for first in team scoring.

Number	Position	Player	Club	GP	G	A	Pts	PIM
26	F	Jaka Ankerst	Diables Rouges de Briançon	3	0	0	0	2
23	D	Damjan Dervarič	HDD Olimpija Ljubljana	6	0	0	0	0
71	F	Bostjan Goličič	HDD Olimpija Ljubljana	6	2	1	3	0
15	D	Blaž Gregorc	Södertälje SK	6	0	2	2	4
84	F	Andrej Hebar	HDD Olimpija Ljubljana	6	1	0	1	4
14	F	Matej Hočevar	HDD Olimpija Ljubljana	6	0	2	2	6
8	F	Žiga Jeglič	HK Acroni Jesenice	6	1	2	3	10
86	D	Sabahudin Kovačevič	Alleghe Hockey	6	0	0	0	0
28	D	Aleš Kranjc	Alba Volán Székesfehérvár	6	1	0	1	8
18	D	Greg Kuznik	EC VSV	6	0	1	1	0
76	F	Rok Pajič	HC Slovan Ústečtí Lvi	6	2	1	3	6
19	F	Žiga Pance	HDD Olimpija Ljubljana	6	0	0	0	2
17	D	Žiga Pavlin	HDD Olimpija Ljubljana	3	0	0	0	0
21	D	Klemen Pretnar	HK Acroni Jesenice	3	0	0	0	0
9	F	Tomaž Razingar	EC VSV	6	3	1	4	4
51	D	Mitja Robar	HK Acroni Jesenice	6	0	2	2	4
12	F	David Rodman	Vienna Capitals	6	1	3	4	2
22	F	Marcel Rodman	Vienna Capitals	6	0	3	3	4
55	F	Robert Sabolič	HK Acroni Jesenice	6	1	3	4	0
10	F	Mitja Šivic	Brûleurs de Loups	4	0	1	1	2
4	D	Andrej Tavželj	SG Pontebba	6	0	1	1	2
24	D	Rok Tičar	HK Acroni Jesenice	5	3	0	3	2

=== Goaltenders ===
Number	Player	Club	GP	W	L	Min	GA	GAA	SV%	SO
1	Andrej Hočevar	SG Pontebba	2	0	1	80	8	6.00	0.771	0
33	Robert Kristan	KHL Medveščak	5	1	4	284	15	3.17	0.926	0
69	Matija Pintarič	HDD Olimpija Ljubljana	0	–	–	–	–	–	–	–

== Sweden ==
- Head coach: Pär Mårts (SWE)

=== Skaters ===
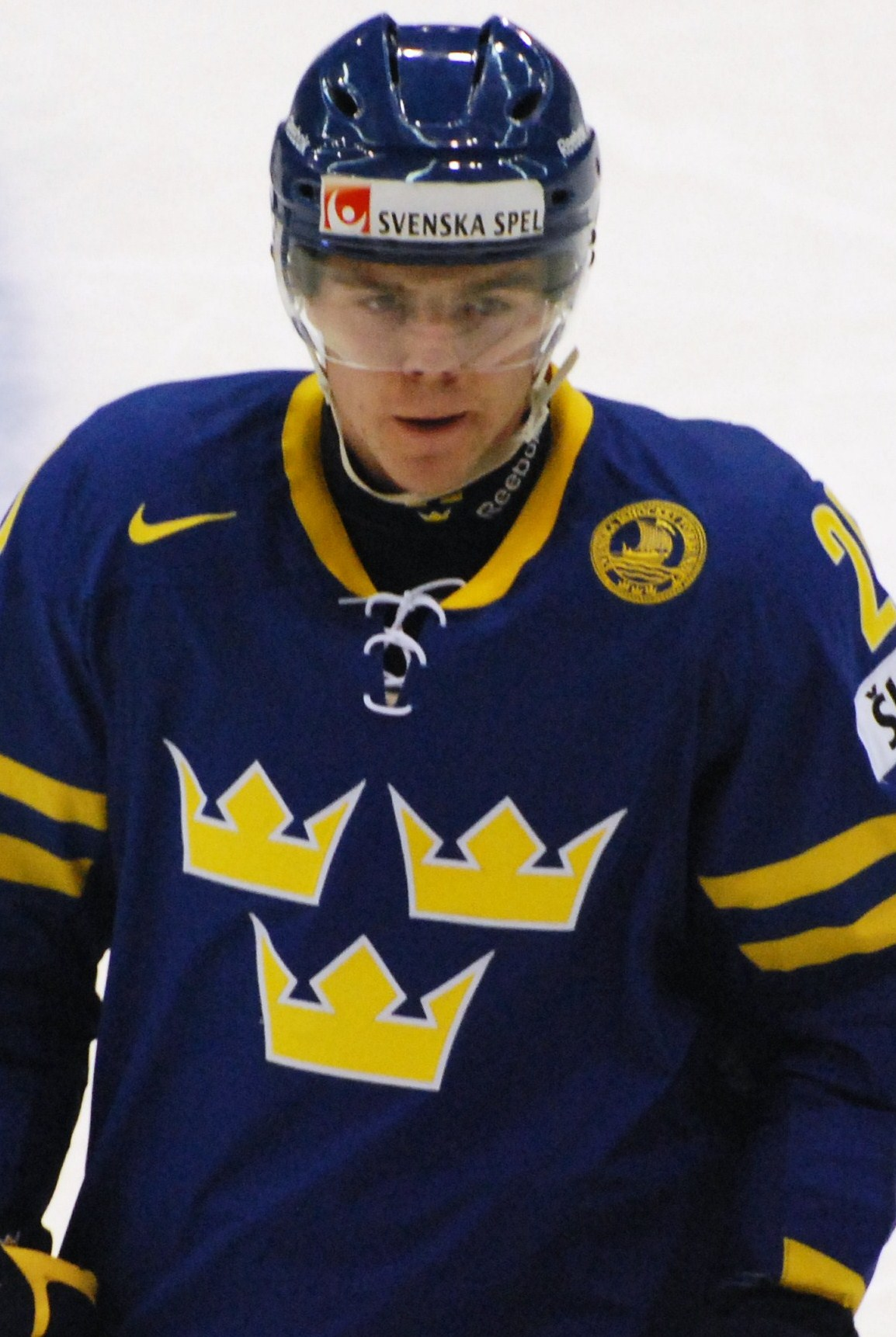
With seven points in nine games, Magnus Pääjärvi tied for second amongst his team in scoring.

Number	Position	Player	Club	GP	G	A	Pts	PIM
60	F	Mikael Backlund	Calgary Flames	9	3	2	5	2
18	F	Patrik Berglund	St. Louis Blues	9	8	2	10	8
3	D	Oliver Ekman-Larsson	Phoenix Coyotes	7	1	3	4	2
42	F	Jimmie Ericsson	Skellefteå AIK	8	2	1	3	2
21	F	Loui Eriksson	Dallas Stars	9	3	1	4	2
44	D	Tim Erixon	Skellefteå AIK	9	0	1	1	2
5	D	Daniel Fernholm	HC Dinamo Minsk	9	0	1	1	4
2	D	Nicklas Grossmann	Dallas Stars	2	0	0	0	4
11	D	Carl Gunnarsson	Toronto Maple Leafs	9	0	2	2	2
8	F	Andreas Jämtin	Linköpings HC	1	0	0	0	0
24	D	Staffan Kronwall	Djurgårdens IF Hockey	9	1	3	4	4
32	F	Marcus Krüger	Chicago Blackhawks	9	2	1	3	10
27	F	Robert Nilsson	Salavat Yulaev Ufa	9	1	6	7	0
91	F	Magnus Pääjärvi	Edmonton Oilers	9	2	5	7	2
23	F	Niklas Persson	HC Neftekhimik Nizhnekamsk	8	3	0	3	8
22	D	David Petrasek	HC Dinamo Minsk	9	2	4	6	10
7	D	David Rundblad	Skellefteå AIK	4	0	1	1	2
33	F	Jakob Silfverberg	Brynäs IF	9	0	1	1	2
15	F	Mattias Sjögren	Färjestad BK	9	1	3	4	2
9	F	Mattias Tedenby	New Jersey Devils	9	1	2	3	8
10	F	Martin Thörnberg	HV71	9	2	4	6	4
51	F	Rickard Wallin	Färjestad BK	9	0	0	0	4

=== Goaltenders ===
Number	Player	Club	GP	W	L	Min	GA	GAA	SV%	SO
30	Viktor Fasth	AIK IF	7	6	1	420	12	1.71	0.946	3
31	Anders Nilsson	Luleå HF	0	–	–	–	–	–	–	–
40	Erik Ersberg	Salavat Yulaev Ufa	2	0	2	125	8	3.84	0.873	0

== Switzerland ==
- Head coach: Sean Simpson (CAN)

=== Skaters ===
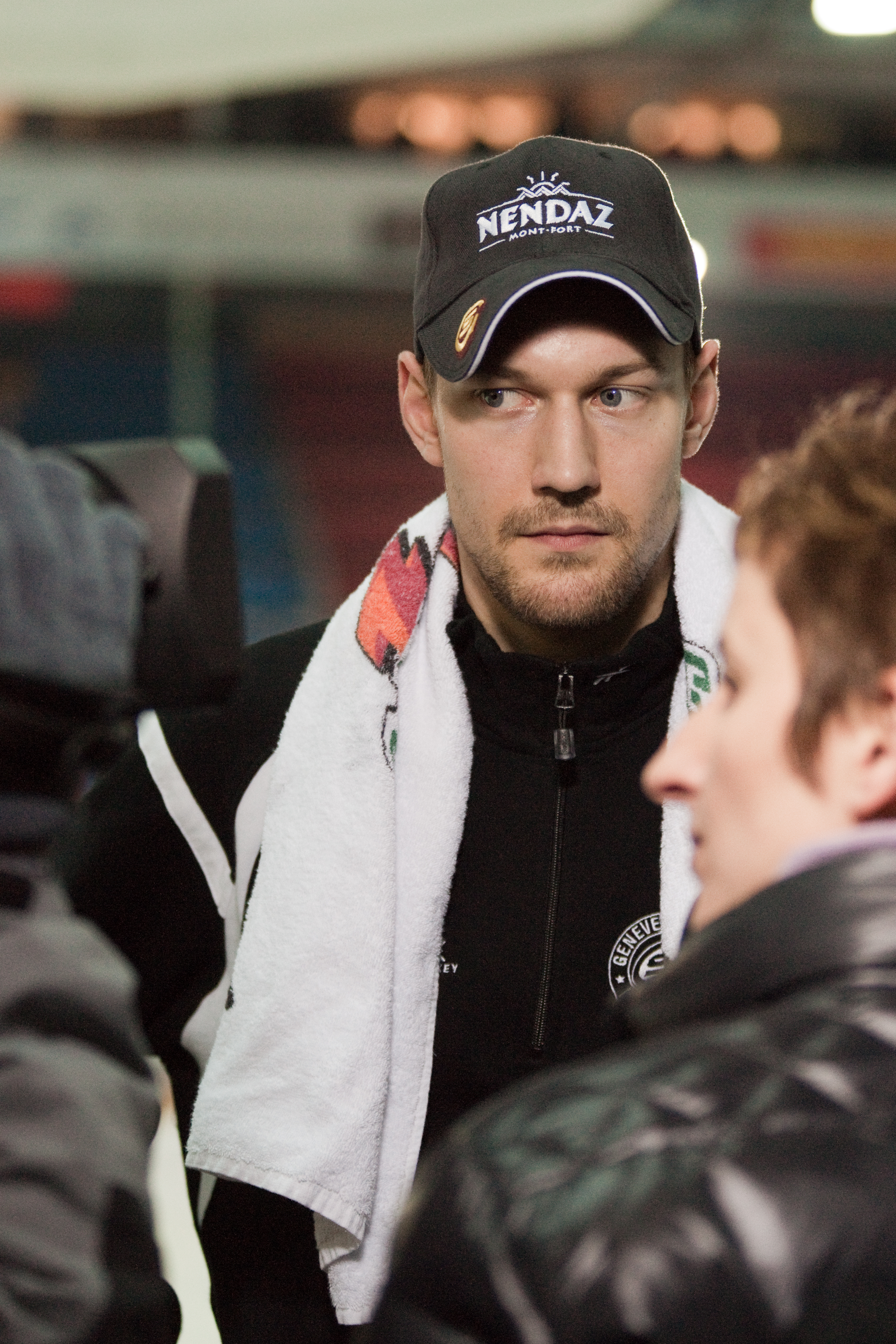
Tobias Stephan started four games, winning three including one shutout.

Number	Position	Player	Club	GP	G	A	Pts	PIM
10	F	Andres Ambühl	ZSC Lions	6	1	1	2	4
57	D	Goran Bezina	Genève-Servette HC	3	1	0	1	4
44	F	Matthias Bieber	Kloten Flyers	6	0	1	1	2
16	D	Raphael Diaz	EV Zug	6	3	1	4	4
13	D	Félicien Du Bois	Kloten Flyers	6	1	1	2	2
54	D	Philippe Furrer	SC Bern	6	0	0	0	4
51	F	Ryan Gardner	SC Bern	6	3	2	5	2
2	D	Beat Gerber	SC Bern	5	0	1	1	2
19	D	John Gobbi	Genève-Servette HC	3	0	0	0	0
67	F	Romano Lemm	Kloten Flyers	4	0	1	1	2
71	F	Kevin Lotscher	EHC Biel	6	2	0	2	2
25	F	Thibaut Monnet	ZSC Lions	6	1	0	1	2
82	F	Simon Moser	SCL Tigers	6	0	2	2	0
28	F	Martin Plüss	SC Bern	6	0	3	3	4
40	F	Daniel Rubin	Genève-Servette HC	3	0	0	0	2
32	F	Ivo Rüthemann	SC Bern	6	2	5	7	6
47	D	Luca Sbisa	Anaheim Ducks	6	0	1	1	4
31	D	Mathias Seger	ZSC Lions	5	0	1	1	4
86	F	Julien Sprunger	HC Fribourg-Gottéron	6	0	1	1	2
22	F	Victor Stancescu	Kloten Flyers	5	0	1	1	2
43	F	Morris Trachsler	Genève-Servette HC	6	0	2	2	2
3	D	Julien Vauclair	HC Lugano	6	1	1	2	2

=== Goaltenders ===
Number	Player	Club	GP	W	L	Min	GA	GAA	SV%	SO
52	Tobias Stephan	Genève-Servette HC	4	3	1	241	7	1.74	0.937	1
63	Leonardo Genoni	HC Davos	2	0	2	124	5	2.43	0.947	0
79	Daniel Manzato	Rapperswil-Jona Lakers	0	–	–	–	–	–	–	–

== United States ==
- Head coach: Scott Gordon (USA)

=== Skaters ===
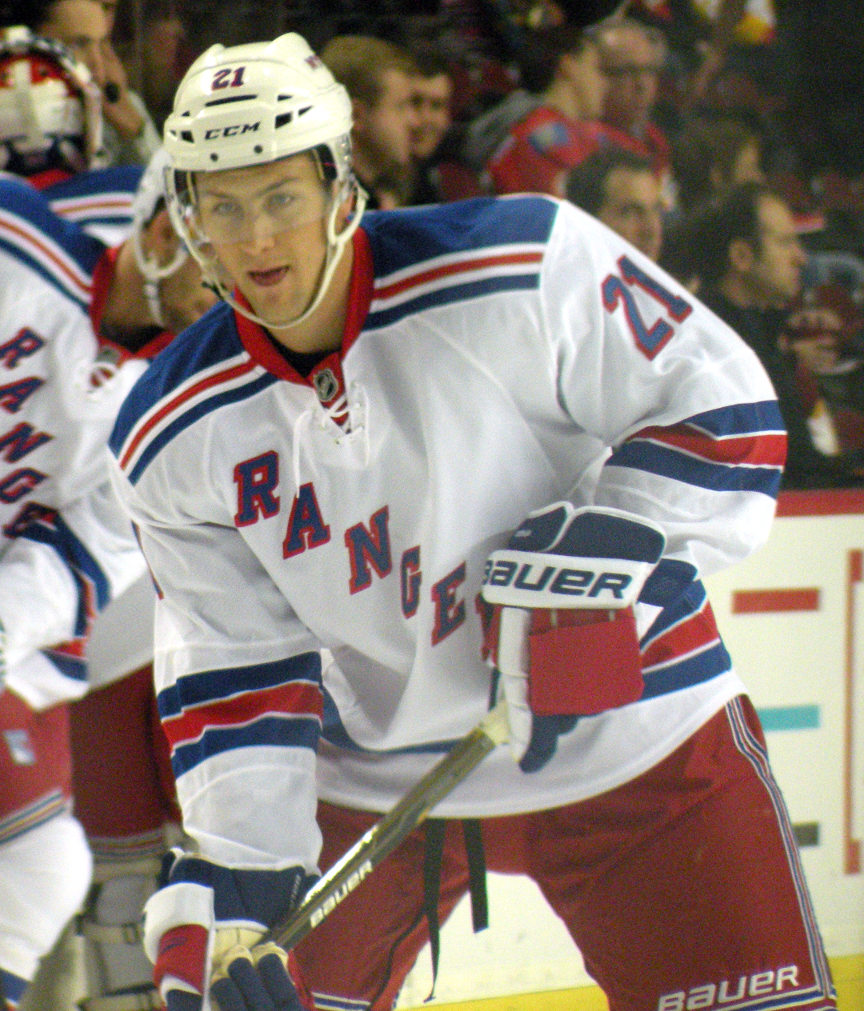
Derek Stepan played seven games, scoring two goals and five assists, and finishing first among his team in scoring.

Number	Position	Player	Club	GP	G	A	Pts	PIM
18	F	Mike Brown	Toronto Maple Leafs	7	0	0	0	0
34	D	Mark Fayne	New Jersey Devils	4	0	1	1	0
7	D	Cam Fowler	Anaheim Ducks	7	1	2	3	2
28	F	Paul Gaustad	Buffalo Sabres	6	0	1	1	4
3	D	Jack Johnson	Los Angeles Kings	7	1	2	3	8
8	D	Mike Komisarek	Toronto Maple Leafs	7	1	1	2	6
19	F	Chris Kreider	Boston College	7	2	1	3	6
2	D	Ryan McDonagh	New York Rangers	7	0	1	1	2
21	F	Andy Miele	Miami University	2	0	2	2	2
25	F	Nick Palmieri	New Jersey Devils	6	2	1	3	0
24	F	Chris Porter	St. Louis Blues	7	0	1	1	2
26	F	Ryan Shannon	Ottawa Senators	7	1	3	4	0
12	D	Kevin Shattenkirk	St. Louis Blues	7	1	2	3	6
20	F	Jack Skille	Florida Panthers	7	1	0	1	2
15	F	Craig Smith	University of Wisconsin	7	3	3	6	4
23	F	Tim Stapleton	Atlanta Thrashers	7	0	1	1	0
22	F	Yan Stastny	HC CSKA Moscow	7	1	1	2	4
9	F	Derek Stepan	New York Rangers	7	2	5	7	2
5	D	Mark Stuart	Atlanta Thrashers	7	1	0	1	8
16	F	James van Riemsdyk	Philadelphia Flyers	2	1	0	1	2
17	F	Blake Wheeler	Atlanta Thrashers	7	2	3	5	6
4	D	Clay Wilson	Florida Panthers	7	0	2	2	0

=== Goaltenders ===
Number	Player	Club	GP	W	L	Min	GA	GAA	SV%	SO
1	Jack Campbell	Windsor Spitfires	0	–	–	–	–	–	–	–
29	Ty Conklin	St. Louis Blues	4	1	3	216	14	3.89	0.892	0
35	Al Montoya	New York Islanders	4	2	1	208	9	2.60	0.871	0
