= Romand (disambiguation) =

Romand is another name for the Franco-Provençal language.

Romand may also refer to:

- Romands, the Swiss Romand people
- Romandy, the Swiss Romand region
- Románd, a village in Hungary
- Ballet Romand, a ballet company in Vevet, Switzerland

== People ==
- Béatrice Romand (born 1952), French actress
- Françoise Romand, French filmmaker
- Jean-Claude Romand (born 1954), French criminal
- Jérémie Romand (born 1988), French ice hockey player
- Baron de Romand
  - Gustave de Romand (1810–1871), French etymologist

== See also ==
- Essert-Romand, a commune in France
