= 2007 IIHF World U18 Championship Division I =

Tournament details
- Host countries: Slovenia; Poland
- Dates: 6–12 April 2007; 4–10 April 2007
- Teams: 12

The 2007 IIHF World U18 Championship Division I were a pair of international under-18 ice hockey tournaments run by the International Ice Hockey Federation. The Division I tournaments made up the second level of competition at the 2007 IIHF World U18 Championships. The Group A tournament took place between 6 April and 12 April 2007 in Maribor, Slovenia and the Group B tournament took place between 4 April and 10 April 2007 in Sanok, Poland. Belarus and Denmark won the Group A and Group B tournaments respectively and gained promotion to the Championship Division for the 2008 IIHF World U18 Championships. While France finished last in Group A and Great Britain last in Group B and were both relegated to Division II for 2008.

== Group A tournament ==
The Group A tournament began on 6 April 2007 in Maribor, Slovenia. Austria, France, Kazakhstan and Slovenia all returned to compete in this years Division I tournament after missing promotion to the Championship Division at the previous years World Championships. Italy gained promotion to Division I after finished first in last years Division II Group A tournament and Belarus was relegated from the Championship Division after failing to survive the relegation round at the 2006 IIHF World U18 Championships.

Belarus won the tournament after winning all five of their games and gained promotion to the Championship Division for the 2008 IIHF World U18 Championships. Slovenia finished second after winning three of their five games and Kazakhstan finished in third place. France finished in last place, managing to only win one game in overtime and were relegated to Division II for the 2007 IIHF World U18 Championships. Andrey Yankov of Kazakhstan led the tournament in goaltending with a save percentage of 0.903, and was named the top goaltender by the IIHF directorate. Slovenia's Blaž Gregorc was named as top defenceman and Mikhail Stefanovich of Belarus was selected as top forward. Stefanovich also was the tournaments leading scorer with twelve points including nine goals and three assists.

=== Standings ===
Pos	Team	Pld	W	OTW	OTL	L	GF	GA	GD	Pts	Promotion or relegation
1	Belarus	5	4	1	0	0	37	11	+26	14	Promoted to the Championship Division for 2008
2	Slovenia	5	3	0	1	1	23	20	+3	10	
3	Kazakhstan	5	2	1	0	2	24	18	+6	8	
4	Italy	5	2	0	1	2	19	20	−1	7	
5	Austria	5	1	0	1	3	14	21	−7	4	
6	France	5	0	1	0	4	13	40	−27	2	Relegated to Division II for 2008

=== Fixtures ===
All times local.

6 April 2007; 13:00	Italy	4–5 GWS (0–3, 2–1, 2–0) (OT 0–0) (SO: 0–1)	Belarus	Tabor Ice Hall; Attendance: 130

Game reference

6 April 2007; 16:30	Austria	4–3 (1–0, 2–1, 1–2)	Kazakhstan	Tabor Ice Hall; Attendance: 120

Game reference

6 April 2007; 20:00	France	2–6 (1–1, 1–3, 0–2)	Slovenia	Tabor Ice Hall; Attendance: 512

Game reference

7 April 2007; 13:00	Kazakhstan	6–1 (1–0, 2–0, 3–1)	Italy	Tabor Ice Hall; Attendance: 100

Game reference

7 April 2007; 16:30	Belarus	15–1 (7–1, 5–0, 3–0)	France	Tabor Ice Hall; Attendance: 130

Game reference

7 April 2007; 20:00	Slovenia	5–3 (2–0, 2–2, 1–1)	Austria	Tabor Ice Hall; Attendance: 685

Game reference

9 April 2007; 13:00	Belarus	4–0 (2–0, 0–0, 2–0)	Austria	Tabor Ice Hall; Attendance: 120

Game reference

9 April 2007; 16:30	Italy	7–2 (6–0, 0–1, 1–1)	France	Tabor Ice Hall; Attendance: 211

Game reference

9 April 2007; 20:00	Slovenia	4–5 OT (2–0, 1–2, 1–2) (OT 0–1)	Kazakhstan	Tabor Ice Hall; Attendance: 725

Game reference

10 April 2007; 13:00	France	5–4 GWS (0–0, 2–1, 2–3) (OT 0–0) (SO: 1–0)	Austria	Tabor Ice Hall; Attendance: 380

Game reference

10 April 2007; 16:30	Kazakhstan	2–6 (0–1, 1–1, 1–4)	Belarus	Tabor Ice Hall; Attendance: 180

Game reference

10 April 2007; 20:00	Slovenia	4–3 (0–1, 2–2, 2–0)	Italy	Tabor Ice Hall; Attendance: 550

Game reference

12 April 2007; 13:00	Kazakhstan	8–3 (1–0, 4–2, 3–1)	France	Tabor Ice Hall; Attendance: 210

Game reference

12 April 2007; 16:30	Austria	3–4 (2–1, 1–2, 0–1)	Italy	Tabor Ice Hall; Attendance: 169

Game reference

12 April 2007; 20:00	Belarus	7–4 (1–0, 4–3, 2–1)	Slovenia	Tabor Ice Hall; Attendance: 1075

Game reference

=== Scoring leaders ===
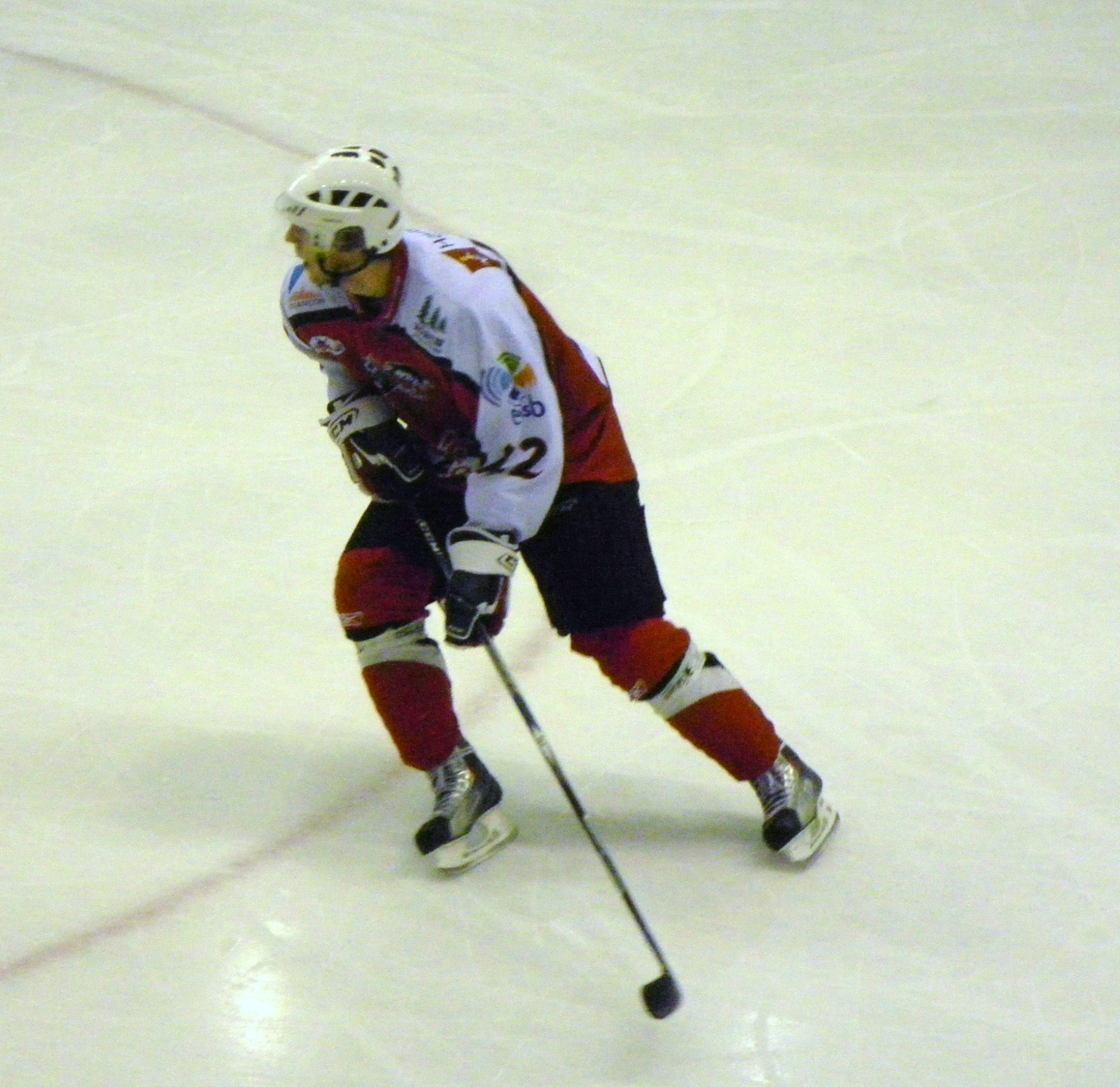
Jaka Ankerst scored three goals and six assists to finish fourth in scoring.

List shows the top ten skaters sorted by points, then goals.

Player	GP	G	A	Pts	+/-	PIM	POS
(Belarus) Mikhail Stefanovich	5	9	3	12	+4	16	F
(Kazakhstan) Yakov Vorobyov	5	7	5	12	+2	8	F
(Kazakhstan) Nikita Ivanov	5	5	7	12	+3	4	F
(Slovenia) Jaka Ankerst	5	3	6	9	+2	4	F
(Belarus) Artem Demkov	5	4	4	8	+4	2	F
(Belarus) Igor Voroshilov	5	2	6	8	+6	0	F
(Slovenia) Jan Urbas	5	4	3	7	+3	0	F
(Belarus) Kirill Brykun	5	3	4	7	+7	2	F
(Belarus) Uladzimir Mikhailau	5	2	5	7	+3	0	F
(Belarus) Pavel Razvodovski	5	5	1	6	+3	0	F

=== Leading goaltenders ===
Only the top five goaltenders, based on save percentage, who have played at least 40% of their team's minutes are included in this list.

Player	MIP	SOG	GA	GAA	SVS%	SO
(Kazakhstan) Andrey Yankov	296:23	176	17	3.44	90.34	0
(Belarus) Aleksandr Zhuk	285:00	104	11	2.32	89.42	1
(Italy) Marco de Filippo Roia	134:56	62	7	3.11	88.71	0
(Slovenia) Matija Pintaric	241:28	136	16	3.98	88.24	0
(Italy) Andreas Bernard	168:56	89	13	4.62	85.39	0

== Group B tournament ==
The Group B tournament began on 4 April 2007 in Sanok, Poland. Denmark, Japan, Poland and Ukraine all returned to compete in this years Division I tournament after missing promotion to the Championship Division at the previous years World Championships. Great Britain gained promotion to Division I after finishing first in last years Division II Group B tournament and Norway was relegated from the Championship Division after failing to survive the relegation round at the 2006 IIHF World U18 Championships.

Denmark won the tournament after winning all five of their games and gained promotion to the Championship Division for the 2008 IIHF World U18 Championships. Japan finished second after losing only to Denmark and Norway finished in third place. Great Britain finished in last place after losing all five of their games and were relegated back to Division II for the 2008 IIHF World U18 Championships. Mikkel Bødker of Denmark led the tournament in scoring, recording eleven points, and was named the tournament's most valuable player and top forward by the IIHF directorate. Japan's Takumi Kamikawa was named to goaltender and Oliver Lauridsen of Denmark was selected as top defenceman. Denmark's Frederik Andersen was the tournament's leading goaltender with a save percentage of 0.937.

=== Standings ===
Pos	Team	Pld	W	OTW	OTL	L	GF	GA	GD	Pts	Promotion or relegation
1	Denmark	5	5	0	0	0	22	6	+16	15	Promoted to the Championship Division for 2008
2	Japan	5	3	1	0	1	22	13	+9	11	
3	Norway	5	2	0	2	1	22	19	+3	8	
4	Poland	5	2	0	0	3	16	26	−10	6	
5	Ukraine	5	1	1	0	3	15	17	−2	5	
6	Great Britain	5	0	0	0	5	10	26	−16	0	Relegated to Division II for 2008

=== Fixtures ===
All times local.

4 April 2007; 13:00	Ukraine	3–4 (1–0, 1–3, 1–1)	Japan	Sanok Arena; Attendance: 300

Game reference

4 April 2007; 16:30	Great Britain	2–7 (2–2, 0–3, 0–2)	Norway	Sanok Arena; Attendance: 400

Game reference

4 April 2007; 20:00	Poland	1–9 (0–3, 0–4, 1–2)	Denmark	Sanok Arena; Attendance: 2200

Game reference

5 April 2007; 13:00	Japan	6–1 (3–0, 2–0, 1–1)	Great Britain	Sanok Arena; Attendance: 180

Game reference

5 April 2007; 16:30	Denmark	4–1 (0–0, 2–1, 2–0)	Ukraine	Sanok Arena; Attendance: 320

Game reference

5 April 2007; 20:00	Norway	6–4 (3–2, 2–1, 1–1)	Poland	Sanok Arena; Attendance: 1600

Game reference

7 April 2007; 13:00	Norway	4–5GWS (1–2, 2–1, 1–1) (OT 0–0) (SO: 0–1)	Ukraine	Sanok Arena; Attendance: 420

Game reference

7 April 2007; 16:30	Great Britain	3–5 (0–4, 0–1, 3–0)	Poland	Sanok Arena; Attendance: 2100

Game reference

7 April 2007; 20:00	Denmark	2–1 (0–1, 0–0, 2–0)	Japan	Sanok Arena; Attendance: 1500

Game reference

9 April 2007; 13:00	Denmark	3–1 (1–1, 1–0, 1–0)	Great Britain	Sanok Arena; Attendance: 230

Game reference

9 April 2007; 16:30	Poland	2–1 (1–0, 0–0, 1–1)	Ukraine	Sanok Arena; Attendance: 1700

Game reference

9 April 2007; 20:00	Japan	4–3 OT (1–1, 0–2, 2–0) (OT 1–0)	Japan	Sanok Arena; Attendance: 1200

Game reference

10 April 2007; 13:00	Ukraine	5–3 (1–1, 2–1, 2–1)	Great Britain	Sanok Arena; Attendance: 220

Game reference

10 April 2007; 16:30	Norway	2–4 (1–2, 1–0, 0–2)	Denmark	Sanok Arena; Attendance: 410

Game reference

10 April 2007; 20:00	Japan	7–4 (2–1, 3–1, 2–2)	Poland	Sanok Arena; Attendance: 2500

Game reference

=== Scoring leaders ===
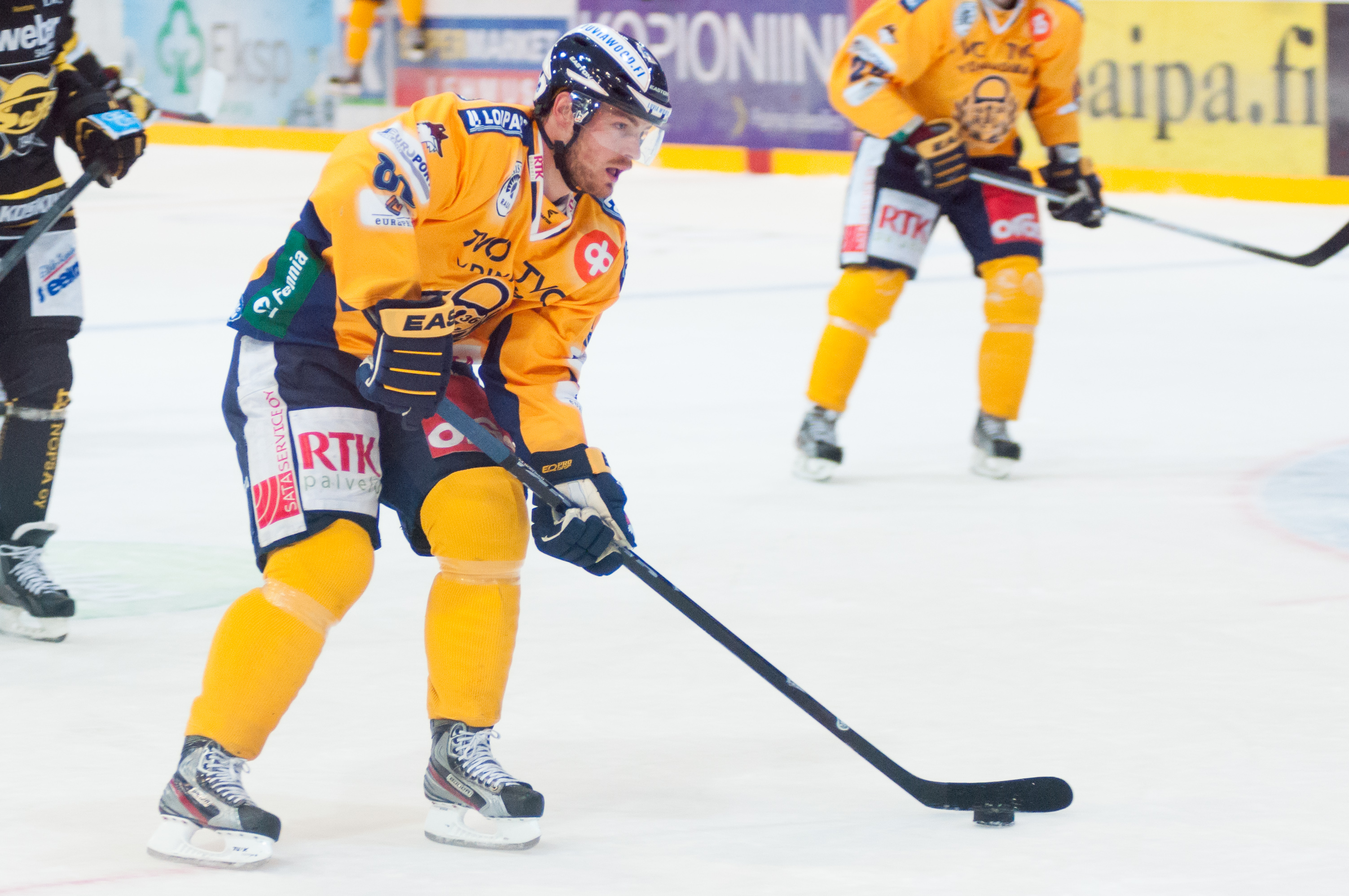
Mikkel Boedker led the tournament in scoring, recording eleven points, and was named the tournament's most valuable player and top forward by the IIHF directorate.

List shows the top ten skaters sorted by points, then goals.

Player	GP	G	A	Pts	+/-	PIM	POS
(Denmark) Mikkel Bødker	5	4	7	11	+6	4	F
(Denmark) Lars Eller	5	3	7	10	+5	6	F
(Norway) Tommy Kristiansen	5	5	4	9	+3	6	F
(Norway) Martin Huse	5	1	7	8	+5	4	F
(Poland) Pawel Dronia	5	6	1	7	+2	4	D
(Norway) Erik Johansen	5	3	4	7	–2	6	D
(Poland) Maciej Szewczyk	5	3	4	7	0	2	F
(Norway) Andreas Martinsen	5	4	2	6	+3	12	F
(Japan) Hiromichi Terao	5	4	2	6	–1	4	F
(Denmark) Frederik Storm	5	3	3	6	+5	0	F

=== Leading goaltenders ===
Only the top five goaltenders, based on save percentage, who have played at least 40% of their team's minutes are included in this list.

Player	MIP	SOG	GA	GAA	SVS%	SO
(Denmark) Frederik Andersen	240:00	79	5	1.25	93.67	0
(Japan) Takumi Kamikawa	233:55	92	8	2.05	91.30	0
(United Kingdom) Euan King	190:42	110	12	3.78	89.09	0
(Ukraine) Mykhaylo Balaban	245:00	99	13	3.18	86.87	0
(Norway) Emil Bariass	181:56	67	10	3.30	85.07	0
