= Pål Grotnes =

Norwegian ice hockey player

- Born: 7 March 1977 (age 49) Lørenskog, Norway
- Height: 6 ft 2 in (188 cm)
- Weight: 190 lb (86 kg; 13 st 8 lb)
- Position: Goaltender
- Caught: Left
- GET team Former teams: Stjernen; Comet; Växjö Lakers; Halmstad Hammers; Clermont Auvergne; Mölndal; Frölunda Indians
- National team: Norway
- Playing career: 1998–2013

Pål Grotnes (born 7 March 1977 in Lørenskog, Norway) is a Norwegian professional ice hockey player, who plays for Stjernen and Norway's national team as a goaltender.

== Playing career ==
Grotnes was born in Norway and raised in Sweden, where his mother was from. He began playing hockey at the age of four as his brother, two years older than Grotnes, wanted to play.

Prior to the 2008–09 season he signed with Stjernen in the Norwegian GET-league, after having played two seasons with Comet. In 2008 he backstopped Comet to the semifinals for the first time in franchise history. Since then he has played two seasons for the Stjernen Hockey team, which he led to the quarter-finals in 2009-10. Stjernan was defeated by Sparta.

== International career ==
2006 Grotnes is the starting goaltender for Norway in the 2006 IIHF World Championship. He played in a 3-1 loss to the United States and part of a 7-1 loss to Canada, being pulled in favor of Mathias Gundersen. Norway finished 3rd in Group D.

2007 Grotnes is the starting goaltender for Norway in the 2007 IIHF World Championship. He went 2-4-0 in 6 games in net, posting a GAA of 3.51 and a save percentage of 0.886.

2008 Grotnes played 7 games for Norway in the 2008 IIHF World Championship. He posted a Goals Against Average of 4.51 and a save percentage of 0.877 while going 1-6-0 in the tournament.

2009 Grotnes played in the 2009 IIHF World Championship. He had a stellar tournament posting a save percentage of 0.906 and a GAA of 3.97 after playing in 6 games for Norway. In games he started he went 1-4-0.

2010 Grotnes was the starting goaltender for Norway in the Vancouver 2010 Winter Olympic Games. He surrendered 4 goals in his first game against Canada before leaving the game with an injury. He returned in his next game against the United States, allowing 6 goals. In his third game of round robin play, Grotnes allowed 4 goals (many of which were rebounds or tap ins) and lost 5-4 to Switzerland in overtime. Grotnes received critical acclaim for his outstanding play. Grotnes was also named starting goaltender for Norway at the 2010 IIHF World Championship in Germany. Grotnes made 39 saves in a 5-2 loss to Sweden, and stopped 44 in Norway's shocking 3-2 upset against the Czech Republic. In Norway's final game of the round robin Grotnes made 26 stops on 27 shots in a 5-1 win over France to send Norway past the preliminary round. In the tournament's qualifying round, Grotnes did not play in a 12-1 loss to Canada and was replaced by Ruban Smith as starting goaltender. He did play in Norway's next game against Latvia, and recording 24 saves in a 5-0 loss. Grotnes has one of his best performances of the tournament in Norway's final game against Switzerland. He stopped 43 shots en route to a 3-2 victory. Grotnes finished the tournament with a record of 3-2-0, a GAA of 3.00 and a save percentage of .921 to cap off an impressive tournament.

2011 Grotnes was named to the 2011 IIHF World Championship rosters for Norway as one of the goaltenders. Before the game against Canada, Grotnes has not played a game.
