= 2006 IIHF World U18 Championship Division II =

Tournament details
- Host countries: Italy; Lithuania
- Dates: 2 – 8 April 2006; 15 March – 21 March 2006
- Teams: 12

The 2006 IIHF World U18 Championship Division II were a pair of international under-18 ice hockey tournaments run by the International Ice Hockey Federation. The Division II tournaments made up the third level of competition at the 2006 IIHF World U18 Championships. The Group A tournament took place between 2 and 8 April 2006 in Merano, Italy and the Group B tournament took place between 15 and 21 March 2006 in Elektrėnai and Kaunas, Lithuania. Italy and Great Britain won the Group A and Group B tournaments respectively and gained promotion to Division I for the 2007 IIHF World U18 Championships. While Spain finished last in Group A and Iceland last in Group B and were both relegated to Division III for 2007.

== Group A tournament ==
The Group A tournament began on 2 April 2006 in Merano, Italy. Estonia, the Netherlands, Serbia and Montenegro and Spain returned to compete in the Division II competition after missing promotion to Division I at the previous years World Championships. Italy entered the Division II competition after being relegated from Division I and Belgium entered the tournament after gaining promotion from Division III at the 2005 IIHF World U18 Championships.

Italy won the tournament after winning all five of their games and gained promotion back to Division I for the 2007 IIHF World U18 Championships. The Netherlands finished in second place, losing only to Italy and Estonia finished in third. Spain finished in last place after losing all five of their games and were relegated to Division III for the 2007 IIHF World U18 Championships. Ivan Demetz of Italy finished as the top scorer of the tournament with 12 points including three goals and nine assists. Italy's Massimo Camin finished as the tournaments leading goaltender with a save percentage of 97.56.

=== Standings ===
Pos	Team	Pld	W	D	L	GF	GA	GD	Pts	Promotion or relegation
1	Italy	5	5	0	0	35	2	+33	10	Promoted to Division I for 2007
2	Netherlands	5	4	0	1	28	8	+20	8	
3	Estonia	5	2	1	2	13	20	−7	5	
4	Belgium	5	1	1	3	12	23	−11	3	
5	Serbia and Montenegro	5	1	0	4	15	26	−11	2	
6	Spain	5	1	0	4	8	32	−24	2	Relegated to Division III for 2007

=== Fixtures ===
All times local.

2 April 2006; 13:30	Netherlands	5 – 0 (1–0, 3–0, 1–0)	Belgium	Merano; Attendance: 150

Game reference

2 April 2006; 16:30	Estonia	6 – 1 (3–0, 1–0, 2–1)	Serbia and Montenegro	Merano; Attendance: 200

Game reference

2 April 2006; 20:00	Italy	7 – 0 (3–0, 2–0, 2–0)	Spain	Merano; Attendance: 1100

Game reference

3 April 2006; 13:30	Spain	0 – 2 (0–1, 0–1, 0–0)	Estonia	Merano; Attendance: 50

Game reference

3 April 2006; 16:30	Serbia and Montenegro	3 – 5 (0–3, 1–1, 2–1)	Netherlands	Merano; Attendance: 70

Game reference

3 April 2006; 20:00	Belgium	1 – 10 (1–4, 0–2, 0–4)	Italy	Merano; Attendance: 350

Game reference

5 April 2006; 13:30	Estonia	2 – 8 (2–3, 0–2, 0–3)	Netherlands	Merano; Attendance: 75

Game reference

5 April 2006; 16:30	Belgium	3 – 5 (2–1, 1–2, 0–2)	Spain	Merano; Attendance: 110

Game reference

5 April 2006; 20:00	Italy	7 – 0 (4–0, 2–0, 1–0)	Serbia and Montenegro	Merano; Attendance: 120

Game reference

6 April 2006; 13:30	Spain	2 – 10 (2–3, 0–3, 0–4)	Serbia and Montenegro	Merano; Attendance: 120

Game reference

6 April 2006; 16:30	Estonia	2 – 2 (0–1, 2–1, 0–0)	Belgium	Merano; Attendance: 130

Game reference

6 April 2006; 20:00	Netherlands	0 – 2 (0–1, 0–1, 0–0)	Italy	Merano; Attendance: 1000

Game reference

8 April 2006; 13:30	Serbia and Montenegro	1 – 6 (0–1, 1–2, 0–3)	Belgium	Merano; Attendance: 75

Game reference

8 April 2006; 16:30	Netherlands	10 – 1 (4–0, 1–0, 5–1)	Spain	Merano; Attendance: 110

Game reference

8 April 2006; 20:00	Italy	9 – 1 (2–0, 4–0, 3–1)	Estonia	Merano; Attendance: 1110

Game reference

=== Scoring leaders ===
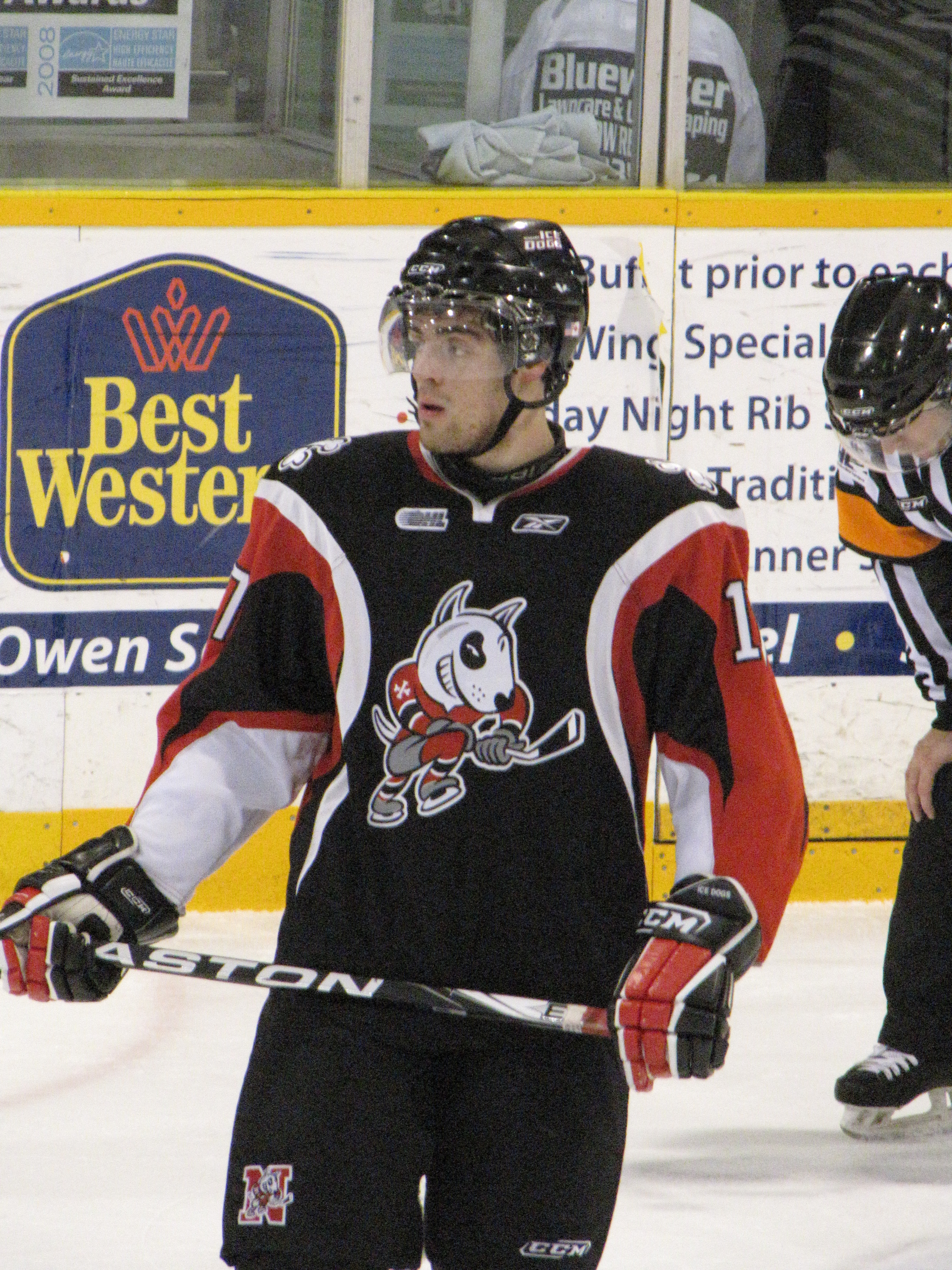
Marco Insam scored four goals and two assists to finish tenth in scoring.

List shows the top ten ranked skaters sorted by points, then goals.

Player	GP	G	A	Pts	+/-	PIM	POS
(Italy) Ivan Demetz	5	3	9	12	+8	6	F
(Italy) Florian Wieser	5	6	3	9	+10	2	F
(Serbia and Montenegro) Marko Milovanovic	5	3	6	9	–3	20	F
(Netherlands) Ivy van den Heuvel	5	5	2	7	+5	22	F
(Italy) Thomas Erlacher	5	3	4	7	+7	35	F
(Belgium) Jordy van de Locht	5	2	5	7	+1	6	F
(Netherlands) Mike Dalhuisen	5	1	6	7	+7	18	D
(Italy) Markus Gander	5	5	1	6	+3	6	F
(Italy) Martin Tutzer	5	4	2	6	+3	0	F
(Italy) Marco Insam	5	4	2	6	+3	4	F

=== Leading goaltenders ===
Only the top five goaltenders, based on save percentage, who have played at least 40% of their team's minutes are included in this list.

Player	MIP	SOG	GA	GAA	SVS%	SO
(Italy) Massimo Camin	149:53	41	1	0.40	97.56	2
(Netherlands) Sjoerd Idzenga	120:00	24	1	0.50	95.83	1
(Italy) Martin Ausserhofer	150:07	23	1	0.40	95.65	2
(Estonia) Kristjan Eerme	249:30	116	12	2.89	89.66	1
(Belgium) Bram de Backer	280:00	172	18	3.86	89.53	0

== Group B tournament ==
The Group B tournament began on 15 March 2006 in Elektrėnai and Kaunas, Lithuania. Croatia, Iceland, Lithuania and Mexico all returned to compete in the Division II tournament after missing promotion to Division I at the previous year's World Championships. Great Britain entered the Division II competition after being relegated from Division I and Australia entered the tournament after gaining promotion from Division III at the 2005 IIHF World U18 Championships.

Great Britain won the tournament after winning all five of their games and gained promotion back to Division I for the 2007 IIHF World U18 Championships. Lithuania finished second after losing only to Great Britain and Australia finished in third place. Iceland finished in last place after losing all five of their games and were relegated to Division III for the 2007 IIHF World U18 Championships. Robert Dowd of Great Britain finished as the top scorer of the tournament with 14 points including six goals and eight assists. Great Britain's Martin Clarkson finished as the tournaments leading goaltender with a save percentage of 94.92.

=== Standings ===
Pos	Team	Pld	W	D	L	GF	GA	GD	Pts	Promotion or relegation
1	Great Britain	5	5	0	0	40	5	+35	10	Promoted to Division I for 2007
2	Lithuania	5	4	0	1	39	12	+27	8	
3	Australia	5	2	0	3	13	30	−17	4	
4	Croatia	5	2	0	3	22	23	−1	4	
5	Mexico	5	2	0	3	10	21	−11	4	
6	Iceland	5	0	0	5	7	40	−33	0	Relegated to Division III for 2007

=== Fixtures ===
All times local.

15 March 2006; 15:00	Australia	0 – 11 (0–3, 0–4, 0–4)	Great Britain	Elektrėnai; Attendance: 720

Game reference

15 March 2006; 17:00	Iceland	1 – 11 (0–5, 0–4, 1–2)	Croatia	Kaunas; Attendance: 150

Game reference

15 March 2006; 18:30	Mexico	3 – 8 (1–3, 1–3, 1–2)	Lithuania	Elektrėnai

Game reference

16 March 2006; 15:00	Croatia	2 – 5 (2–0, 0–2, 0–3)	Australia	Elektrėnai; Attendance: 680

Game reference

16 March 2006; 17:00	Great Britain	6 – 2 (1–2, 2–0, 3–0)	Mexico	Kaunas; Attendance: 230

Game reference

16 March 2006; 18:30	Lithuania	9 – 1 (4–0, 4–0, 1–1)	Iceland	Elektrėnai; Attendance: 1290

Game reference

18 March 2006; 12:00	Great Britain	14 – 2 (2–0, 5–1, 7–1)	Iceland	Kaunas; Attendance: 130

Game reference

18 March 2006; 15:30	Australia	3 – 4 (1–1, 1–2, 1–1)	Mexico	Kaunas; Attendance: 540

Game reference

18 March 2006; 19:00	Lithuania	11 – 5 (1–2, 7–1, 3–2)	Croatia	Kaunas; Attendance: 500

Game reference

19 March 2006; 15:00	Mexico	1 – 0 (1–0, 0–0, 0–0)	Iceland	Elektrėnai

Game reference

19 March 2006; 18:00	Croatia	0 – 6 (0–2, 0–2, 0–2)	Great Britain	Kaunas; Attendance: 230

Game reference

19 March 2006; 18:30	Lithuania	10 – 0 (2–0, 6–0, 2–0)	Australia	Elektrėnai; Attendance: 1405

21 March 2006; 12:00	Iceland	3 – 5 (3–3, 0–1, 0–1)	Australia	Elektrėnai; Attendance: 714

Game reference

21 March 2006; 15:30	Croatia	4 – 0 (1–0, 1–0, 2–0)	Mexico	Elektrėnai

Game reference

21 March 2006; 19:00	Great Britain	3 – 1 (0–0, 1–1, 2–0)	Lithuania	Elektrėnai; Attendance: 2890

Game reference

=== Scoring leaders ===
List shows the top ten ranked skaters sorted by points, then goals.

Player	GP	G	A	Pts	+/-	PIM	POS
(United Kingdom) Robert Dowd	5	6	8	14	+13	18	F
(United Kingdom) James Ferrara	5	4	10	14	+12	10	F
(Lithuania) Povilas Verenis	5	8	5	13	+8	12	F
(United Kingdom) Craig Peacock	5	7	6	13	+14	0	F
(Lithuania) Tadas Kumeliauskas	5	4	8	12	+7	8	F
(Lithuania) Sergej Ivanuskin	5	5	6	11	+8	12	F
(Croatia) Domagoj Bozic	5	5	3	8	-3	10	F
(Lithuania) Jonas Viknius	5	4	4	8	+4	8	F
(Croatia) Filip Markotic	5	1	7	8	+2	2	F
(Croatia) Michael Novak	5	5	2	7	-1	32	F

=== Leading goaltenders ===
Only the top five goaltenders, based on save percentage, who have played at least 40% of their team's minutes are included in this list.

Player	MIP	SOG	GA	GAA	SVS%	SO
(United Kingdom) Martin Clarkson	210:37	59	3	0.85	94.92	2
(Lithuania) Arturas Kuzmicius	184:09	95	7	2.28	92.62	1
(Croatia) Tihomir Filipec	298:38	171	23	4.62	86.55	1
(Iceland) Aron Stefansson	142:54	94	14	5.88	85.11	0
(Australia) Olivier Martin	194:49	112	18	5.54	83.93	1
