= Kasper Jensen (ice hockey) =

Danish ice hockey player

- Born: May 28, 1987 (age 38)
- Height: 6 ft 2 in (188 cm)
- Weight: 196 lb (89 kg; 14 st 0 lb)
- Position: Defence
- Shoots: Left
- AL-Bank Ligaen team Former teams: AaB Ishockey; Tingsryds AIF
- National team: Denmark
- NHL draft: Undrafted
- Playing career: 2007–present

Kasper Jensen (born May 28, 1987) is a Danish ice hockey defenceman who plays for Aalborg Pirates of the Danish AL-Bank Ligaen. He has represented Denmark at two World Championships in 2011 and 2012.

Jensen signed with Tingsryd for the 2012–13 Hockey Allsvenskan season, but played just six games before he was released from his contract by mutual consent.
