= John Gobbi =

Swiss ice hockey player

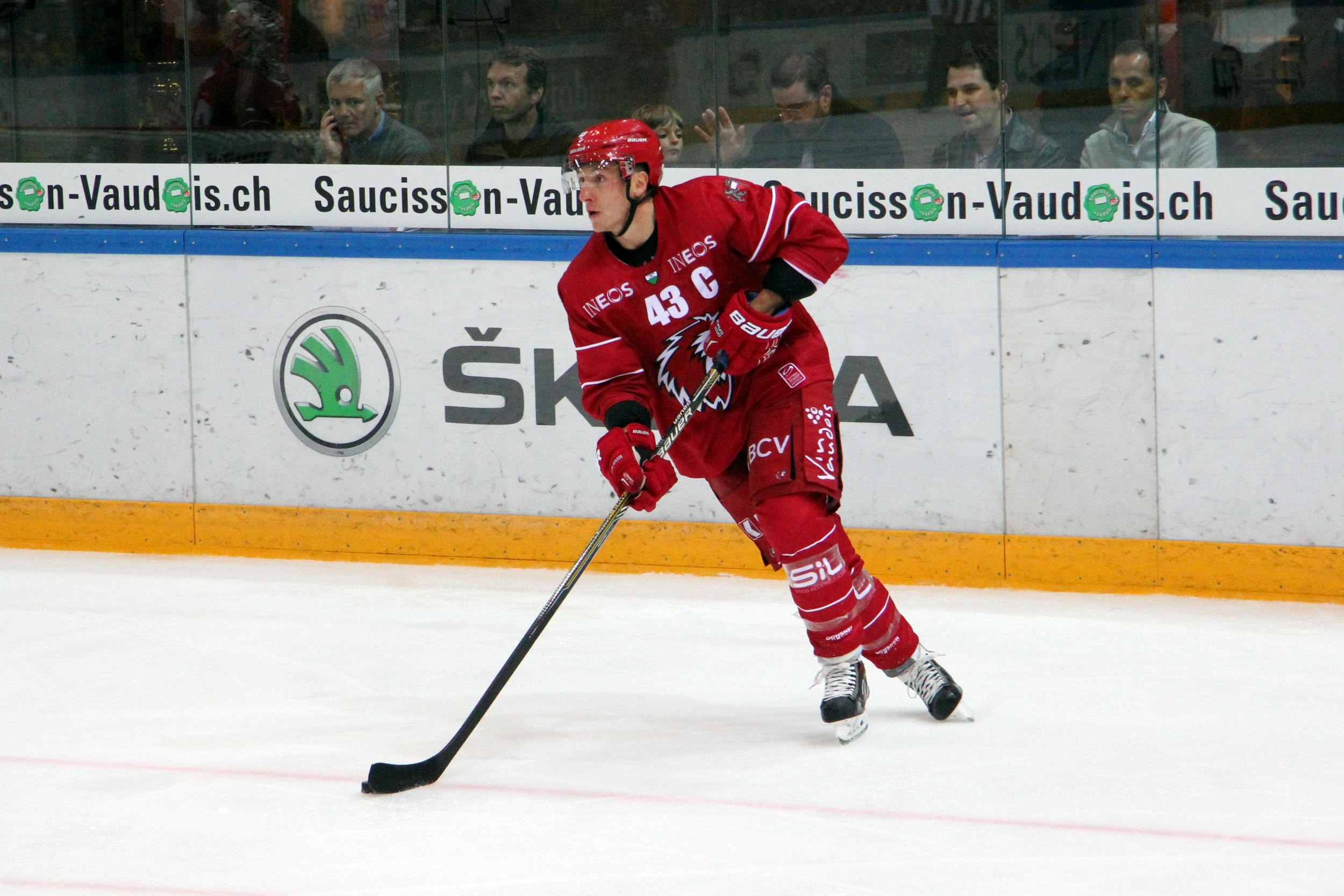
- John Gobbi with LHC in 2014
- Born: September 25, 1981 (age 44) Faido, Switzerland
- Height: 5 ft 11 in (180 cm)
- Weight: 187 lb (85 kg; 13 st 5 lb)
- Position: Defence
- Shot: Left
- Played for: HC Ambrì-Piotta; Genève-Servette HC; ZSC Lions; Lausanne HC
- National team: Switzerland
- NHL draft: Undrafted
- Playing career: 1999–2018

John Gobbi (born September 25, 1981) is a Swiss former professional ice hockey defenceman who played for HC Ambrì-Piotta, Genève-Servette HC, the ZSC Lions and Lausanne HC in the National League (NL).

Gobbi is currently the CEO of HC Fribourg-Gottéron.

Gobbi appeared in 785 regular season games (171 points) in the NL, as well as 144 playoffs games, putting up 33 points.

He participated at the 2011 IIHF World Championship as a member of the Switzerland men's national ice hockey team.

== Career statistics ==
			Regular season					Playoffs
Season	Team	League	GP	G	A	Pts	PIM	GP	G	A	Pts	PIM
1998–99	HC Ambrì-Piotta	NLA	—	—	—	—	—	6	0	0	0	2
1998–99	HC Sierre	NLB	2	0	0	0	0	—	—	—	—	—
1999–00	HC Ambrì-Piotta	NLA	14	0	0	0	4	9	0	0	0	0
2000–01	HC Ambrì-Piotta	NLA	44	0	1	1	30	—	—	—	—	—
2000–01	Lausanne HC	NLB	1	0	0	0	0	—	—	—	—	—
2001–02	HC Ambrì-Piotta	NLA	17	1	1	2	14	6	0	0	0	4
2001–02	HC Sierre	NLB	22	2	6	8	58	—	—	—	—	—
2002–03	HC Ambrì-Piotta	NLA	41	0	3	3	28	4	0	0	0	2
2002–03	HC Bolzano	Italy	—	—	—	—	—	5	1	0	1	8
2003–04	HC Ambrì-Piotta	NLA	48	2	6	8	54	7	1	0	1	18
2004–05	Genève-Servette HC	NLA	44	8	9	17	68	4	0	1	1	6
2005–06	Genève-Servette HC	NLA	43	5	3	8	64	—	—	—	—	—
2006–07	Genève-Servette HC	NLA	44	3	9	12	87	5	0	1	1	2
2007–08	Genève-Servette HC	NLA	50	4	9	13	106	16	6	4	10	20
2008–09	Genève-Servette HC	NLA	50	4	11	15	92	4	0	1	1	8
2009–10	Genève-Servette HC	NLA	32	2	15	17	32	20	2	8	10	38
2010–11	Genève-Servette HC	NLA	45	3	10	13	78	6	0	0	0	4
2011–12	ZSC Lions	NLA	41	1	4	5	42	15	0	0	0	0
2012–13	ZSC Lions	NLA	21	1	2	3	14	—	—	—	—	—
2012–13	HC Ambrì-Piotta	NLA	27	0	2	2	61	—	—	—	—	—
2013–14	Lausanne HC	NLA	50	5	15	20	54	6	0	1	1	14
2014–15	Lausanne HC	NLA	50	3	15	18	70	7	0	0	0	8
2015–16	Lausanne HC	NLA	50	2	7	9	42	—	—	—	—	—
2016–17	Lausanne HC	NLA	48	2	2	4	73	4	0	0	0	6
2017–18	Lausanne HC	NLA	26	0	1	1	14	—	—	—	—	—
NLA totals			785	46	125	171	1,027	144	12	21	33	146
