= Ballet Romand =

Ballet Romand is a dance company located in Vevey, Switzerland. It was founded in 2005 as a non-profit association. The company was founded by American born dancer, Kim White.

== Founder ==
Ballet Romand founder, Kim White began her dance studies at an early age under her mother, Nan Klinger. She continued her studies at the School of American Ballet, home of the New York City Ballet. She holds a diploma from the National Academy of Art. She was the first representative of the United States to compete in the Prix de Lausanne. Her professional career as a principal dancer expanded across America. She started teaching in 1979 while dancing professionally and has taught in renowned schools in New York such as Steps, Broadway Dance Center and the National Dance Institute where she continues to give summer instruction. In 1989, Kim founded the Los Angeles Youth Ballet. She continues to work with youth companies in America and England. In 2004, Kim was a recipient of a Swiss Award, the Prix de L’Eveil, recognizing her commitment and work with young people in dance.

== Consultants ==
- Anna du Boisson—West London School of Dance (London, UK)
- Maria Welch—Cuyahoga Valley Youth Ballet (Akron, Ohio, USA)
- Lori Klinger—Rosie's Broadway Kids (New York, New York, USA)
- Darren Parish—Royal Academy of Ballet, Danceworks (London, UK)
- Céline Chazot—Ex Béjart Ballet
- Pam Pribisco—NYC choreographer
- Pasquale Alberico—Ex Béjart Ballet
