= Nicolas Arrossamena =

French professional ice hockey forward

- Born: January 9, 1990 (age 36) Saint Pierre and Miquelon
- Height: 5 ft 11 in (180 cm)
- Weight: 165 lb (75 kg; 11 st 11 lb)
- Position: Forward
- Shoots: Right
- France team Former teams: Anglet Hormadi Élite; Brûleurs de Loups; Rapaces de Gap; Dragons de Rouen; Dauphins d'Épinal; Ducs d'Angers
- National team: France
- NHL draft: Undrafted
- Playing career: 2008–present

Nicolas Arrossamena (born January 9, 1990) is a French professional ice hockey forward who plays for Anglet Hormadi Élite of the Ligue Magnus.

Arrossamena played for France at the 2011 IIHF World Championship.
