= Marco Insam =

Italian ice hockey player

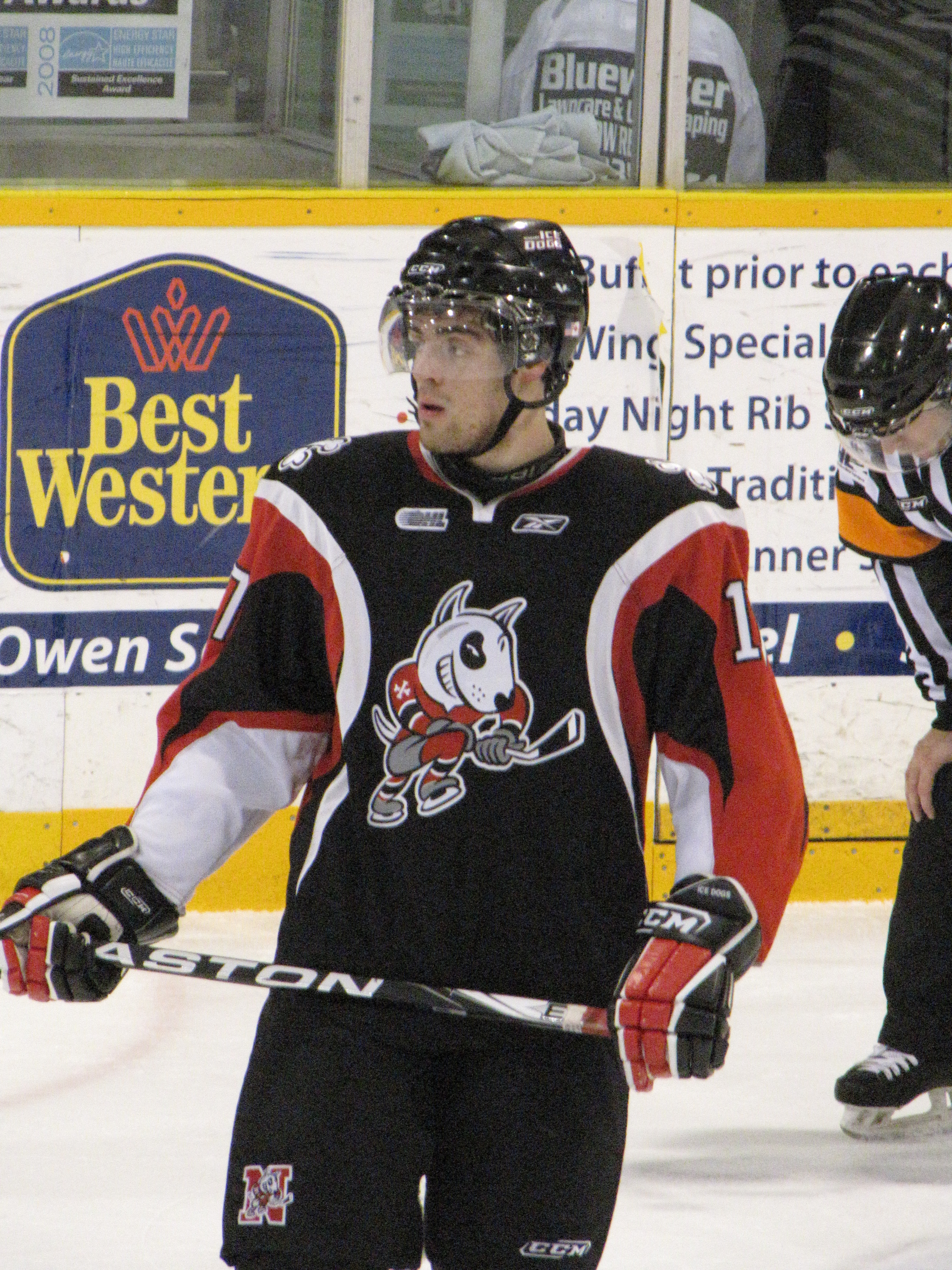
- Insam with the Niagara IceDogs in 2009
- Born: 5 June 1989 (age 36) Sëlva, Italy
- Height: 6 ft 2 in (188 cm)
- Weight: 203 lb (92 kg; 14 st 7 lb)
- Position: Forward
- Shoots: Right
- AlpsHL team Former teams: Ritten/Renon; HC Milano; HC Bolzano; Ässät
- National team: Italy
- NHL draft: Undrafted
- Playing career: 2006–present

Marco Insam (born 5 June 1989) is an Italian professional ice hockey forward who is currently playing for Italian club, Ritten/Renon of the Alps Hockey League (AlpsHL). Insam competed in the 2012 IIHF World Championship as a member of the Italy men's national ice hockey team.
