= Jaka Ankerst =

Slovenian ice hockey player

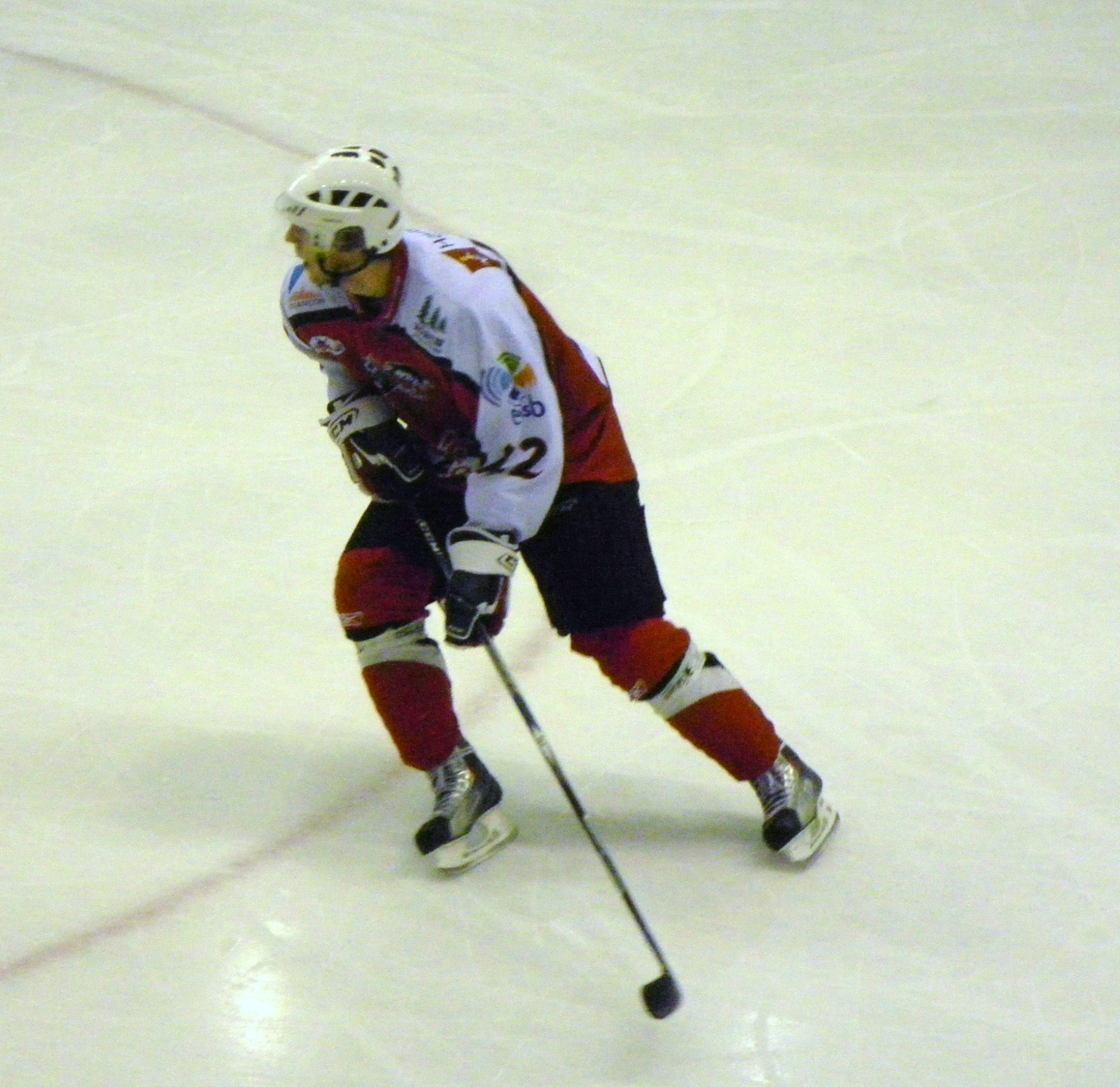
- Born: March 27, 1989 (age 36) Kranj, SFR Yugoslavia
- Height: 6 ft 0 in (183 cm)
- Weight: 179 lb (81 kg; 12 st 11 lb)
- Position: Forward
- Shoots: Left side
- Alps Hockey League team Former teams: HDD Jesenice; HK Bled; HK Maribor; Diables Rouges de Briançon; HDD Olimpija Ljubljana; Gothiques d'Amiens; Lions de Lyon
- National team: Slovenia
- NHL draft: Undrafted
- Playing career: 2011–present

Jaka Ankerst (born March 27, 1989) is a Slovenian ice hockey player. He participated in the 2011 IIHF World Championship as a member of the Slovenia men's national ice hockey team.
