= Jérémie Romand =

French ice hockey player

- Born: February 28, 1988 (age 37) Sallanches, France
- Height: 6 ft 3 in (191 cm)
- Weight: 209 lb (95 kg; 14 st 13 lb)
- Position: Left wing
- Shoots: Left
- France team Former teams: Gothiques d'Amiens; Dragons de Rouen; Drakkars de Caen; Brest Albatros Hockey; Aigles de Nice
- National team: France
- Playing career: 2007–present

Jérémie Romand (born February 28, 1988, in Sallanches) is a French professional ice hockey left winger who currently plays for Gothiques d'Amiens of the Ligue Magnus.

Romand previously played for Dragons de Rouen, Drakkars de Caen, Brest Albatros Hockey and Aigles de Nice. He also played for France at the 2011 IIHF World Championship.
