= Ugarov =

Ugarov (Russian: Угаров) is a Russian masculine surname, its feminine counterpart is Ugarova. It may refer to

- Aleksandr Ugarov (born 1982), Russian football player
- Alexei Ugarov (born 1985), Belarusian football player
- Boris Ugarov (1922–1991), Russian realist painter
- Denis Ugarov (born 1975), Russian football coach and a former player
