= 2008 IIHF World Championship =

2008 edition of the IIHF World Championship

Tournament details
- Host country: Canada
- Venues: 2 (in 2 host cities)
- Dates: May 2–18
- Opened by: Michaëlle Jean
- Teams: 16

Final positions
- Champions: Russia (2nd title)
- Runners-up: Canada
- Third place: Finland
- Fourth place: Sweden

Tournament statistics
- Games played: 54
- Goals scored: 357 (6.61 per game)
- Attendance: 477,040 (8,834 per game)
- Scoring leader: (Canada) Dany Heatley (20 points)

Awards
- MVP: (Canada) Dany Heatley

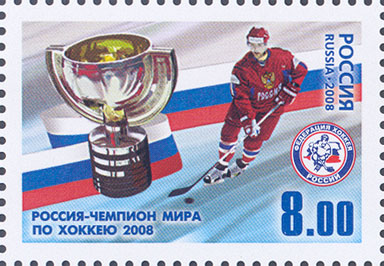
A 2008 Russian stamp commemorating the championship team

The 2008 IIHF World Championship was played between May 2 and May 18, 2008 in the Canadian cities of Halifax (Nova Scotia) and Quebec City (Quebec). The two venues were the Halifax Metro Centre and the Colisée Pepsi. The tournament was won by Russia which claimed its first gold medal since 1993.

It was the 72nd IIHF World Championship event, and was run by the International Ice Hockey Federation (IIHF). It was the first time the final tournament is held in a non-European country since 1962, when it was held in Colorado, United States. The IIHF wanted to celebrate the federation's 100th anniversary by holding the tournament in the country where ice hockey was born. The tournament was also included as part of the celebrations of Quebec City's 400th anniversary.

The tournament featured many countries' elite stars, as it served as the last and most important stage in selecting nine automatic qualifiers for the men's hockey competition at the 2010 Winter Olympics in Vancouver, British Columbia, Canada, a process that uses the IIHF World Ranking standings after the tournament.

On May 8, 2007, the IIHF announced it "will also formalize the Triple Gold Club by awarding commemorative medals to the 19 players who have won the three most prestigious championships in world hockey: Olympic gold, Stanley Cup, and World Championship gold. The ceremony will take place in Canada during the 2008 World Championship."

There were two changes in the format compared to earlier years. Because of the distance between Halifax and Quebec City, the quarter-finals were played within the group, instead of crossing over which has happened since 2000. The relegation round was different too, as it consisted of two best-of-three series instead of a round robin series between four teams.

For the first time in 40 years, the matches were played on smaller, NHL size rinks, 200 ft × 85 ft (roughly 61 m × 26 m), compared to the IIHF standard which is roughly 200 ft × 98.5 ft (61 m × 30 m).

== Participating teams ==
Group A

- Belarus (roster)
- France (roster)
- Sweden (roster)
- Switzerland (roster)

Group B

- Canada (roster)
- Latvia (roster)
- Slovenia (roster)
- United States (roster)

Group C

- Finland (roster)
- Germany (roster)
- Norway (roster)
- Slovakia (roster)

Group D

- Czech Republic (roster)
- Denmark (roster)
- Italy (roster)
- Russia (roster)

== Venues ==
Quebec	Venues of the 2008 IIHF World Championship	Halifax
Colisée Pepsi	Venues of the 2008 IIHF World Championship	Halifax Metro Centre
46°49′51″N 71°14′47″W	Venues of the 2008 IIHF World Championship	44°38′54″N 63°34′36″W
Capacity: 13,400	Venues of the 2008 IIHF World Championship	Capacity: 10,595

== Rules ==
For standing purposes, points shall be awarded as follows:

- 3 points for a win in regulation time
- 2 points for a win in overtime or in shootout
- 1 point for a loss in overtime or in shootout
- No points for a loss in regulation time

If a game is tied after regulation time, a five-minute four-on-four sudden-death overtime session is played followed by a three-player shootout if necessary. Exceptions: quarter-finals, semi-final and bronze-medal overtime session are 10 minutes and gold-medal game overtime session is 20 minutes.

If teams are tied in a standing based on points, the following tie-breakers are applied: 1) The most points earned in direct games involving tied teams. 2) The best goal differential in direct games involving tied teams. 3) The most goals scored in direct games involving tied teams. 4) Follow steps 1, 2 and 3 with games involving the highest non-tied team in the same group. 5) Repeat step 4 with games involving the second highest non-tied team in the same group. 6) Continue this process with all non-tied team games.

This was also the first major IIHF championship that used the four-official system with two referees and two linesmen instead of standard three-official system with only one referee.

== Preliminary round ==
Sixteen participating teams were placed in the following four groups. After playing a round-robin, the top three teams in each group advanced to the Qualifying round while the last team competed in the Relegation round.

=== Group A ===
Pos	Team	Pld	W	OTW	OTL	L	GF	GA	GD	Pts	Qualification
1	Switzerland	3	3	0	0	0	10	4	+6	9	Qualifying round
2	Sweden	3	2	0	0	1	17	9	+8	6	Qualifying round
3	Belarus	3	1	0	0	2	9	9	0	3	Qualifying round
4	France	3	0	0	0	3	2	16	−14	0	Relegation round

Source: IIHF

All times are local (UTC-4).

May 3, 2008; 13:00	Belarus	5–6 (1–2, 3–2, 1–2)	Sweden	Colisée Pepsi, Quebec City, Quebec; Attendance: 9,204

Game reference
	Referees: Sami Partanen (Finland); Jyri Rönn (Finland)
V. Kostyuchenok 18:32; S. Zadelenov 22:58; A. Ugarov 23:45; A. Zhurik (PP1) 35:57; D. Meleshko 41:18 / Goals / 03:59 M. Johansson; 12:18 N. Bäckström; 26:23 (PP2) P. Hörnqvist; 37:51 R. Nilsson; 43:41 P. Hörnqvist; 50:32 R. Wallin	Referees: Sami Partanen (Finland); Jyri Rönn (Finland)

May 3, 2008; 19:00	Switzerland	4–1 (2–0, 1–1, 1–0)	France	Colisée Pepsi, Quebec City, Quebec; Attendance: 9,367

Game reference
	Referees: Guy Pellerin (Canada); Chris Savage (Canada)
R. Wick (PP1) 08:18; J. Sprunger (PP1) 16:54; P. Bärtschi 23:01; R. Sannitz 40:31 / Goals / 39:59 (PP1) J. Desrosiers	Referees: Guy Pellerin (Canada); Chris Savage (Canada)

May 5, 2008; 13:00	Switzerland	2–1 (1–0, 1–1, 0–0)	Belarus	Colisée Pepsi, Quebec City, Quebec; Attendance: 8,016

Game reference
	Referees: Rick Looker (United States); Peter Ország (Slovakia)
J. Sprunger (PP1) 13:01; J. Sprunger (PP1) 34:36 / Goals / 27:34 K. Koltsov	Referees: Rick Looker (United States); Peter Ország (Slovakia)

May 5, 2008; 19:00	Sweden	9–0 (0–0, 4–0, 5–0)	France	Colisée Pepsi, Quebec City, Quebec; Attendance: 8,845

Game reference
	Referees: Daniel Piechaczek (Germany); Thomas Sterns (United States)
T. Mårtensson 28:46; P. Hörnqvist (PP1) 34:21; M. Weinhandl 36:16; N. Wallin 39:42; N. Bäckström 44:31; A. Edler (PP1) 47:36; R. Nilsson 49:22; K. Jönsson (PP2) 51:46; N. Bäckström 59:35 / Goals	Referees: Daniel Piechaczek (Germany); Thomas Sterns (United States)

May 7, 2008; 13:00	Sweden	2–4 (1–2, 0–0, 1–2)	Switzerland	Colisée Pepsi, Quebec City, Quebec; Attendance: 7,939

Game reference
	Referees: Guy Pellerin (Canada); Jyri Rönn (Finland)
F. Warg 10:47; P. Hörnqvist (SH1) 59:01 / Goals / 00:48 T. Paterlini; 16:35 A. Ambühl; 45:23 T. Monnet; 59:53 (ENG) B. Forster	Referees: Guy Pellerin (Canada); Jyri Rönn (Finland)

May 7, 2008; 19:00	France	1–3 (1–1, 0–1, 0–1)	Belarus	Colisée Pepsi, Quebec City, Quebec; Attendance: 8,880

Game reference
	Referees: Sami Partanen (Finland); Chris Savage (Canada)
O. Coqueux (SH1) 19:53 / Goals / 12:57 A. Kalyuzhny; 27:48 A. Ugarov; 59:15 A. Kostitsyn	Referees: Sami Partanen (Finland); Chris Savage (Canada)

=== Group B ===
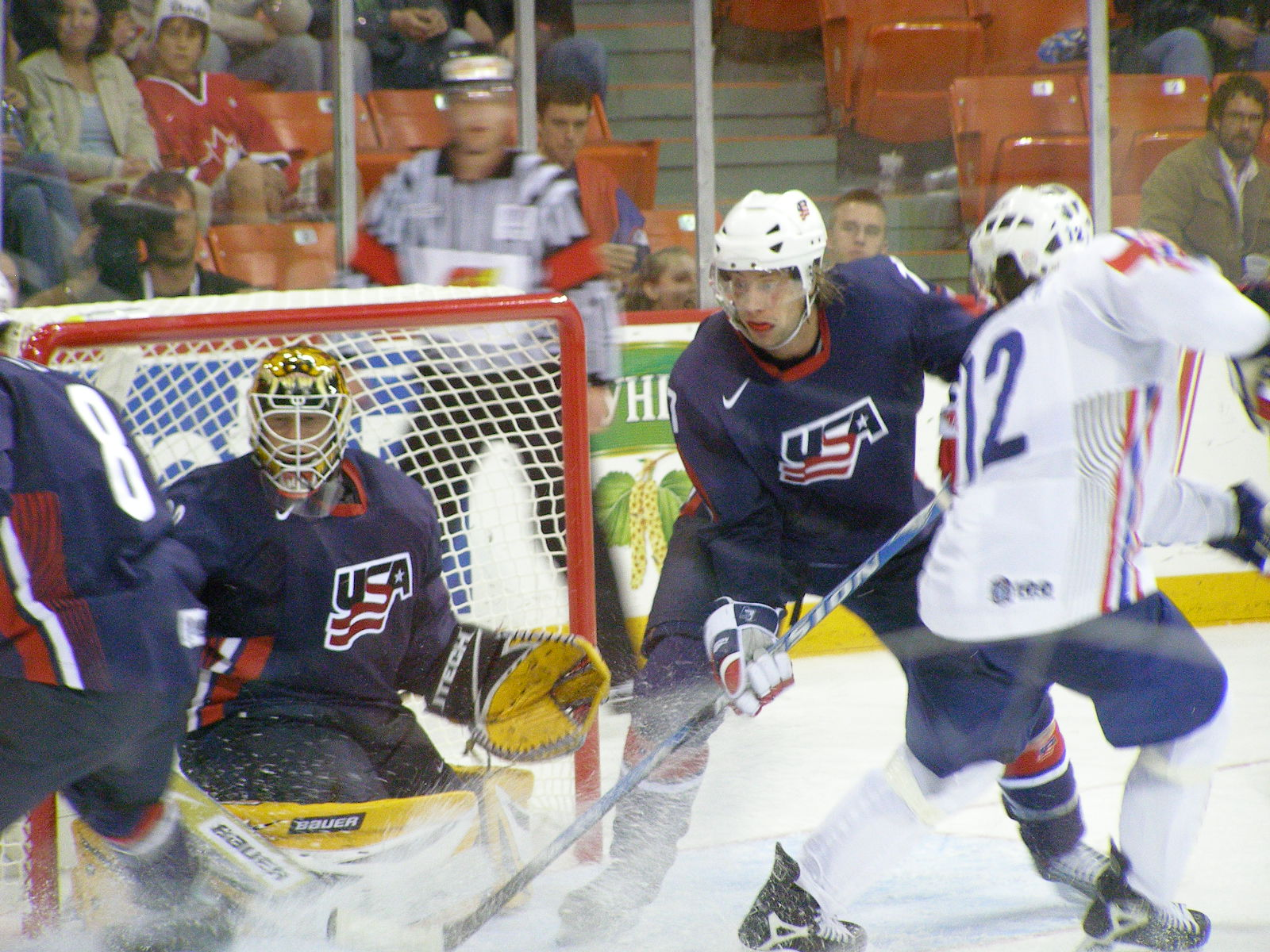
USA against Slovenia

Pos	Team	Pld	W	OTW	OTL	L	GF	GA	GD	Pts	Qualification
1	Canada	3	3	0	0	0	17	5	+12	9	Qualifying round
2	United States	3	2	0	0	1	13	6	+7	6	Qualifying round
3	Latvia	3	1	0	0	2	3	11	−8	3	Qualifying round
4	Slovenia	3	0	0	0	3	2	13	−11	0	Relegation round

Source: IIHF

All times are local (UTC-3).

May 2, 2008; 16:30	Canada	5–1 (1–0, 3–1, 1–0)	Slovenia	Metro Centre, Halifax, Nova Scotia; Attendance: 7,921

Game reference
	Referees: Vyacheslav Bulanov (Russia); Alexander Poliakov (Russia)
D. Hamhuis 03:45; D. Heatley 20:41; M. St. Louis (PP1) 30:18; D. Heatley (PP1) 35:07; D. Heatley 50:25 / Goals / 32:19 (PP2) A. Kopitar	Referees: Vyacheslav Bulanov (Russia); Alexander Poliakov (Russia)

May 2, 2008; 20:15	United States	4–0 (1–0, 1–0, 2–0)	Latvia	Metro Centre, Halifax, Nova Scotia; Attendance: 7,360

Game reference
	Referees: Milan Minář (Czech Republic); Richard Schütz (Germany)
D. Brown (PP1) 07:21; P. Kane (PP1) 28:44; Z. Parise (PP1) 47:09; P. O'Sullivan (PP1) 51:05 / Goals	Referees: Milan Minář (Czech Republic); Richard Schütz (Germany)

May 4, 2008; 16:30	Latvia	0–7 (0–3, 0–4, 0–0)	Canada	Metro Centre, Halifax, Nova Scotia; Attendance: 7,831

Game reference
	Referees: Danny Kurmann (Switzerland); Christer Larking (Sweden)
Goals / 02:35 P. Sharp; 03:45 M. Green; 12:15 D. Heatley; 21:03 (PP1) R. Nash; 22:00 M. St. Louis; 22:42 C. Kunitz; 32:20 R. Nash	Referees: Danny Kurmann (Switzerland); Christer Larking (Sweden)

May 4, 2008; 20:15	United States	5–1 (1–0, 2–1, 2–0)	Slovenia	Metro Centre, Halifax, Nova Scotia; Attendance: 7,056

Game reference
	Referees: Brent Reiber (Switzerland); Marcus Vinnerborg (Sweden)
P. Kane (PP1) 11:12; P. Kessel (PP1) 26:48; P. Kessel (PP1) 32:41; D. Booth 45:05; P. Kessel 49:24 / Goals / 36:36 A. Kopitar	Referees: Brent Reiber (Switzerland); Marcus Vinnerborg (Sweden)

May 6, 2008; 16:30	Canada	5–4 (2–0, 1–2, 2–2)	United States	Metro Centre, Halifax, Nova Scotia; Attendance: 9,192

Game reference
	Referees: Vyacheslav Bulanov (Russia); Christer Larking (Sweden)
B. Burns 08:26; D. Heatley 19:49; J. Toews 20:18; D. Roy 43:29; D. Heatley 59:13 / Goals / 20:52 Z. Parise; 23:09 P. O'Sullivan; 45:18 (PP1) D. Brown; 46:54 (PP1) J. Pominville	Referees: Vyacheslav Bulanov (Russia); Christer Larking (Sweden)

May 6, 2008; 20:15	Slovenia	0–3 (0–0, 0–2, 0–1)	Latvia	Metro Centre, Halifax, Nova Scotia; Attendance: 7,806

Game reference
	Referees: Alexander Poliakov (Russia); Richard Schütz (Germany)
Goals / 30:15 (PS) A. Ņiživijs; 31:24 (PP1) A. Širokovs; 59:32 (ENG) A. Širokovs	Referees: Alexander Poliakov (Russia); Richard Schütz (Germany)

=== Group C ===
Pos	Team	Pld	W	OTW	OTL	L	GF	GA	GD	Pts	Qualification
1	Finland	3	2	1	0	0	11	5	+6	8	Qualifying round
2	Norway	3	1	0	1	1	6	10	−4	4	Qualifying round
3	Germany	3	1	0	0	2	7	10	−3	3	Qualifying round
4	Slovakia	3	1	0	0	2	9	8	+1	3	Relegation round

Source: IIHF

All times are local (UTC-3).

May 3, 2008; 16:30	Germany	1–5 (0–0, 1–2, 0–3)	Finland	Metro Centre, Halifax, Nova Scotia; Attendance: 7,658

Game reference
F. Busch (PP1) 32:44 / Goals / 21:09 (PP1) M. Koivu; 27:26 (PP2) O. Jokinen; 40:24 (SH1) M. Koivu; 42:33 H. Hyvönen; 52:27 T. Selänne

May 3, 2008; 20:15	Slovakia	5–1 (1–0, 2–1, 2–0)	Norway	Metro Centre, Halifax, Nova Scotia; Attendance: 7,096

Game reference
	Referees: Danny Kurmann (Switzerland); Brent Reiber (Switzerland)
T. Melichárek (SH1) 09:43; J. Kolník 20:15; R. Petrovický (PP1) 27:44; M. Hossa 40:07; P. Podhradský 58:24 / Goals / 28:43 M. Olimb	Referees: Danny Kurmann (Switzerland); Brent Reiber (Switzerland)

May 5, 2008; 16:30	Finland	3–2 OT (2–2, 0–0, 0–0) (OT: 1–0)	Norway	Metro Centre, Halifax, Nova Scotia; Attendance: 7,190

Game reference
	Referees: Milan Minář (Czech Republic); Richard Schütz (Germany)
J. Jokinen (PP1) 01:37; V. Peltonen (PP1) 16:14; T. Ruutu 61:27 / Goals / 04:26 M. Ask; 19:51 (PP2) A. Bastiansen	Referees: Milan Minář (Czech Republic); Richard Schütz (Germany)

May 5, 2008; 20:15	Slovakia	2–4 (0–2, 1–1, 1–1)	Germany	Metro Centre, Halifax, Nova Scotia; Attendance: 7,855

Game reference
	Referees: Vyacheslav Bulanov (Russia); Alexander Poliakov (Russia)
I. Čiernik (PP1) 29:39; J. Kolník (PP1) 59:56 / Goals / 06:57 (PP1) M. Sturm; 15:05 (PP1) S. Ustorf; 38:05 M. Hackert; 48:42 (PP1) M. Hackert	Referees: Vyacheslav Bulanov (Russia); Alexander Poliakov (Russia)

May 7, 2008; 16:30	Finland	3–2 (2–2, 1–0, 0–0)	Slovakia	Metro Centre, Halifax, Nova Scotia; Attendance: 7,262

Game reference
	Referees: Danny Kurmann (Switzerland); Marcus Vinnerborg (Sweden)
N. Kapanen 02:05; T. Ruutu (PP1) 13:00; T. Selänne (PP1) 25:17 / Goals / 13:14 R. Petrovický; 18:21 M. Kováčik	Referees: Danny Kurmann (Switzerland); Marcus Vinnerborg (Sweden)

May 7, 2008; 20:15	Norway	3–2 (0–1, 1–1, 2–0)	Germany	Metro Centre, Halifax, Nova Scotia; Attendance: 7,414

Game reference
	Referees: Milan Minář (Czech Republic); Brent Reiber (Switzerland)
M. Holtet (PP2) 34:51; M. Zuccarello Aasen 47:19; M. Ask (PP2) 55:53 / Goals / 06:37 (PP1) M. Sturm; 24:09 P. Gogulla	Referees: Milan Minář (Czech Republic); Brent Reiber (Switzerland)

=== Group D ===
Pos	Team	Pld	W	OTW	OTL	L	GF	GA	GD	Pts	Qualification
1	Russia	3	2	1	0	0	16	6	+10	8	Qualifying round
2	Czech Republic	3	2	0	1	0	16	9	+7	7	Qualifying round
3	Denmark	3	1	0	0	2	9	11	−2	3	Qualifying round
4	Italy	3	0	0	0	3	5	20	−15	0	Relegation round

Source: IIHF

All times are local (UTC-4).

May 2, 2008; 13:00	Denmark	2–5 (2–2, 0–2, 0–1)	Czech Republic	Colisée Pepsi, Quebec City, Quebec; Attendance: 8,369

Game reference
	Referees: Rick Looker (United States); Thomas Sterns (United States)
S. Lassen 00:31; J. Hansen 18:03 / Goals / 08:00 R. Vrbata; 13:49 (PP1) A. Kotalík; 24:35 R. Vrbata; 31:31 Z. Irgl; 50:52 J. Hejda	Referees: Rick Looker (United States); Thomas Sterns (United States)

May 2, 2008; 19:00	Russia	7–1 (1–0, 5–0, 1–1)	Italy	Colisée Pepsi, Quebec City, Quebec; Attendance: 11,074

Game reference
	Referees: Peter Ország (Slovakia); Daniel Piechaczek (Germany)
A. Semin 04:02; A. Ovechkin 23:39; A. Morozov 29:01; A. Tereshchenko 30:12; A. Semin 31:18; M. Sushinski 36:58; D. Zaripov (PP1) 55:38 / Goals / 51:29 J. Cirone	Referees: Peter Ország (Slovakia); Daniel Piechaczek (Germany)

May 4, 2008; 13:00	Czech Republic	4–5 OT (2–2, 1–1, 1–1) (OT: 0–1)	Russia	Colisée Pepsi, Quebec City, Quebec; Attendance: 13,109

Game reference
	Referees: Guy Pellerin (Canada); Chris Savage (Canada)
P. Eliáš (PP1) 09:08; A. Kotalík (PP1) 12:05; P. Eliáš (PP1) 33:47; P. Eliáš (PP1) 42:51 / Goals / 03:47 S. Zinovjev; 19:59 (PP2) K. Gorovikov; 27:44 (PP1) A. Morozov; 46:47 (PP1) K. Korneyev; 63:10 A. Morozov	Referees: Guy Pellerin (Canada); Chris Savage (Canada)

May 4, 2008; 19:00	Italy	2–6 (0–3, 1–1, 1–2)	Denmark	Colisée Pepsi, Quebec City, Quebec; Attendance: 6,838

Game reference
	Referees: Sami Partanen (Finland); Jyri Rönn (Finland)
J. Cirone 37:48; N. Fontanive (PP1) 47:09 / Goals / 03:54 M. Green; 08:11 (PP1) K. Staal; 10:26 (PP2) J. Hansen; 23:31 (PP1) D. Nielsen; 50:32 J. Damgaard; 56:03 K. Degn	Referees: Sami Partanen (Finland); Jyri Rönn (Finland)

May 6, 2008; 13:00	Russia	4–1 (1–0, 2–0, 1–1)	Denmark	Colisée Pepsi, Quebec City, Quebec; Attendance: 8,609

Game reference
	Referees: Rick Looker (United States); Daniel Piechaczek (Germany)
M. Afinogenov 10:38; A. Ovechkin (PP1) 27:07; S. Fedorov (PP1) 29:45; K. Gorovikov 42:47 / Goals / 57:25 (PP1) K. Staal	Referees: Rick Looker (United States); Daniel Piechaczek (Germany)

May 6, 2008; 19:00	Czech Republic	7–2 (2–2, 4–0, 1–0)	Italy	Colisée Pepsi, Quebec City, Quebec; Attendance: 7,517

Game reference
	Referees: Peter Ország (Slovakia); Thomas Sterns (United States)
M. Erat 00:41; R. Vrbata 04:19; M. Židlický (PP1) 21:29; R. Vrbata 30:42; P. Eliáš (PP1) 37:47; F. Kuba 39:02; J. Hlinka 43:53 / Goals / 00:59 L. Ansoldi; 03:06 N. Fontanive	Referees: Peter Ország (Slovakia); Thomas Sterns (United States)

== Qualifying round ==
The top three teams in the standings of each group of the Preliminary round advance to the Qualifying round, and are placed in two groups: teams from Groups A and D compete in Group E, while teams from Groups B and C compete in Group F.

Each team is to play three games in this round, one against each of the three teams from the other group with which they have been paired. These three games, along with the two games already played against the other two advancing teams from the same group in the Preliminary round, will count in the Qualifying round standings.

The top four teams in both groups E and F to advance in quarter-finals.

=== Group E ===
Pos	Team	Pld	W	OTW	OTL	L	GF	GA	GD	Pts	Qualification
1	Russia	5	3	2	0	0	21	13	+8	13	Playoff round
2	Czech Republic	5	2	1	1	1	20	14	+6	9	Playoff round
3	Sweden	5	3	0	0	2	23	16	+7	9	Playoff round
4	Switzerland	5	3	0	0	2	16	15	+1	9	Playoff round
5	Belarus	5	0	0	3	2	13	18	−5	3	
6	Denmark	5	0	1	0	4	9	26	−17	2	

Source: IIHF

All times are local (UTC-4).

May 8, 2008; 15:00	Sweden	8–1 (2–0, 2–0, 4–1)	Denmark	Colisée Pepsi, Quebec City, Quebec; Attendance: 7,327

Game reference
	Referees: Peter Ország (Slovakia); Guy Pellerin (Canada)
K. Jönsson 08:47; M. Nilson 15:33; T. Mårtensson 35:35; A. Strålman 36:44; K. Fabricius 40:41; M. Weinhandl 41:48; R. Wallin 43:55; T. Mårtensson (PP1) 50:14 / Goals / 54:32 K. Degn	Referees: Peter Ország (Slovakia); Guy Pellerin (Canada)

May 8, 2008; 19:00	Switzerland	0–5 (0–1, 0–3, 0–1)	Czech Republic	Colisée Pepsi, Quebec City, Quebec; Attendance: 9,603

Game reference
	Referees: Rick Looker (United States); Daniel Piechaczek (Germany)
Goals / 19:06 (SH1) M. Erat; 34:46 (PP1) T. Kaberle; 35:50 (PP1) P. Eliáš; 39:33 T. Fleischmann; 58:10 J. Novotný	Referees: Rick Looker (United States); Daniel Piechaczek (Germany)

May 9, 2008; 13:00	Russia	4–3 GWS (0–2, 1–0, 2–1) (OT: 0–0) (SO: 2–1)	Belarus	Colisée Pepsi, Quebec City, Quebec; Attendance: 8,031

Game reference
	Referees: Sami Partanen (Finland); Jyri Rönn (Finland)
M. Afinogenov 23:54; A. Ovechkin 47:21; M. Afinogenov 53:51; A. Morozov (GWG) 65:00 / Goals / 07:27 A. Mikhalev; 11:53 D. Dudik; 56:12 A. Ugarov	Referees: Sami Partanen (Finland); Jyri Rönn (Finland)

May 10, 2008; 12:30	Czech Republic	3–2 GWS (0–1, 1–0, 1–1) (OT: 0–0) (SO: 2–1)	Belarus	Colisée Pepsi, Quebec City, Quebec; Attendance: 8,504

Game reference
	Referees: Guy Pellerin (Canada); Jyri Rönn (Finland)
T. Rolínek 36:53; A. Kotalík 53:38; A. Kotalík (GWG) 65:00 / Goals / 18:12 Y. Chupris; 49:50 A. Kostitsyn	Referees: Guy Pellerin (Canada); Jyri Rönn (Finland)

May 10, 2008; 16:30	Russia	3–2 (0–1, 1–1, 2–0)	Sweden	Colisée Pepsi, Quebec City, Quebec; Attendance: 12,665

Game reference
	Referees: Peter Ország (Slovakia); Daniel Piechaczek (Germany)
A. Semin 32:14; S. Fedorov 44:57; A. Ovechkin 59:54 / Goals / 07:15 M. Weinhandl; 39:10 T. Mårtensson	Referees: Peter Ország (Slovakia); Daniel Piechaczek (Germany)

May 11, 2008; 13:00	Denmark	2–7 (0–2, 0–3, 2–2)	Switzerland	Colisée Pepsi, Quebec City, Quebec; Attendance: 8,338

Game reference
	Referees: Daniel Piechaczek (Germany); Chris Savage (Canada)
M. Madsen 43:04; K. Staal (PS) 45:26 / Goals / 02:10 A. Ambühl; 03:42 S. Jeannin; 20:50 M. Reichert; 31:01 T. Paterlini; 33:21 P. DiPietro; 41:38 P. Furrer; 46:20 (PP1) B. Forster	Referees: Daniel Piechaczek (Germany); Chris Savage (Canada)

May 11, 2008; 19:00	Sweden	5–3 (0–0, 2–2, 3–1)	Czech Republic	Colisée Pepsi, Quebec City, Quebec; Attendance: 7,864

Game reference
	Referees: Sami Partanen (Finland); Guy Pellerin (Canada)
A. Strålman 26:03; M. Nilson 33:32; M. Weinhandl 41:14; P. Hörnqvist 55:07; M. Nilson (ENG) 59:34 / Goals / 30:06 (PP1) P. Eliáš; 38:26 (PP1) A. Kotalík; 49:41 T. Fleischmann	Referees: Sami Partanen (Finland); Guy Pellerin (Canada)

May 12, 2008; 13:00	Switzerland	3–5 (0–3, 0–1, 3–1)	Russia	Colisée Pepsi, Quebec City, Quebec; Attendance: 8,286

Game reference
	Referees: Rick Looker (United States); Jyri Rönn (Finland)
R. Sannitz (PP1) 40:32; J. Vauclair (SH1) 45:30; R. Lemm 58:25 / Goals / 15:21 D. Kalinin; 17:49 (PP1) A. Ovechkin; 18:45 M. Sushinski; 30:27 S. Fedorov; 57:25 (ENG) M. Sushinski	Referees: Rick Looker (United States); Jyri Rönn (Finland)

May 12, 2008; 19:00	Belarus	2–3 OT (0–0, 0–1, 2–1) (OT: 0–1)	Denmark	Colisée Pepsi, Quebec City, Quebec; Attendance: 8,517

Game reference
	Referees: Peter Ország (Slovakia); Thomas Sterns (United States)
A. Ugarov 55:42; D. Meleshko 57:59 / Goals / 23:06 (PP1) K. Staal; 59:22 P. Regin; 62:11 P. Regin	Referees: Peter Ország (Slovakia); Thomas Sterns (United States)

=== Group F ===
Pos	Team	Pld	W	OTW	OTL	L	GF	GA	GD	Pts	Qualification
1	Canada	5	5	0	0	0	30	9	+21	15	Playoff round
2	Finland	5	3	1	0	1	16	12	+4	11	Playoff round
3	United States	5	3	0	0	2	25	13	+12	9	Playoff round
4	Norway	5	1	0	1	3	8	20	−12	4	Playoff round
5	Germany	5	1	0	0	4	13	27	−14	3	
6	Latvia	5	1	0	0	4	8	19	−11	3	

Source: IIHF

All times are local (UTC-3).

May 8, 2008; 16:30	Canada	2–1 (1–0, 0–1, 1–0)	Norway	Metro Centre, Halifax, Nova Scotia; Attendance: 7,380

Game reference
	Referees: Danny Kurmann (Switzerland); Marcus Vinnerborg (Sweden)
M. Green (PP1) 09:32; R. Nash (PP1) 56:02 / Goals / 33:59 (SH1) M. Hansen	Referees: Danny Kurmann (Switzerland); Marcus Vinnerborg (Sweden)

May 8, 2008; 20:15	United States	6–4 (3–2, 1–1, 2–1)	Germany	Metro Centre, Halifax, Nova Scotia; Attendance: 7,352

Game reference
	Referees: Vyacheslav Bulanov (Russia); Alexander Poliakov (Russia)
Z. Parise 00:25; P. O'Sullivan 02:10; J. Wisniewski 02:52; J. Pominville (PP2) 26:52; Z. Parise (PP1) 51:04; D. Brown 58:24 / Goals / 14:03 M. Hackert; 17:52 (PP1) C. Schmidt; 30:23 F. Busch; 44:55 (PP1) M. Bakos	Referees: Vyacheslav Bulanov (Russia); Alexander Poliakov (Russia)

May 9, 2008; 12:30	Finland	2–1 (0–1, 1–0, 1–0)	Latvia	Metro Centre, Halifax, Nova Scotia; Attendance: 7,215

Game reference
	Referees: Alexander Poliakov (Russia); Brent Reiber (Switzerland)
A. Pihlström 29:21; N. Kapanen 50:04 / Goals / 01:27 L. Dārziņš	Referees: Alexander Poliakov (Russia); Brent Reiber (Switzerland)

May 10, 2008; 16:30	Germany	1–10 (0–4, 0–5, 1–1)	Canada	Metro Centre, Halifax, Nova Scotia; Attendance: 9,182

Game reference
	Referees: Vyacheslav Bulanov (Russia); Danny Kurmann (Switzerland)
F. Hördler 48:40 / Goals / 05:14 J. Spezza; 13:35 D. Heatley; 16:05 E. Staal; 19:37 P. Sharp; 23:42 (PP1) E. Staal; 28:20 E. Staal; 32:07 (PP1) D. Roy; 35:30 E. Staal; 38:12 (SH1) J. Mayers; 41:47 (PP1) M. Green	Referees: Vyacheslav Bulanov (Russia); Danny Kurmann (Switzerland)

May 11, 2008; 12:30	Norway	1–4 (1–2, 0–1, 0–1)	Latvia	Metro Centre, Halifax, Nova Scotia; Attendance: 9,017

Game reference
	Referees: Christer Lärking (Sweden); Brent Reiber (Switzerland)
L. E. Spets 12:56 / Goals / 11:34 M. Cipulis; 17:22 H. Vasiļjevs; 22:27 M. Rēdlihs; 59:36 (ENG) L. Dārziņš	Referees: Christer Lärking (Sweden); Brent Reiber (Switzerland)

May 11, 2008; 16:30	Finland	3–2 (0–0, 0–2, 3–0)	United States	Metro Centre, Halifax, Nova Scotia; Attendance: 8,867

Game reference
	Referees: Vyacheslav Bulanov (Russia); Alexander Poliakov (Russia)
V. Koistinen (PP2) 42:12; T. Selänne 50:44; M. Koivu 56:10 / Goals / 21:30 T. Gilbert; 39:15 (PP1) P. Kessel	Referees: Vyacheslav Bulanov (Russia); Alexander Poliakov (Russia)

May 12, 2008; 12:30	United States	9–1 (3–0, 3–1, 3–0)	Norway	Metro Centre, Halifax, Nova Scotia; Attendance: 8,490

Game reference
	Referees: Alexander Poliakov (Russia); Brent Reiber (Switzerland)
B. Dubinsky 11:12; D. Brown 12:15; P. Kane (PP1) 19:03; B. Dubinsky 25:48; P. Martin 31:19; Z. Parise (PP1) 32:18; D. Brown 42:33; P. Kessel 45:44; B. Dubinsky (PP1) 51:35 / Goals / 28:08 (PP2) M. Trygg	Referees: Alexander Poliakov (Russia); Brent Reiber (Switzerland)

May 12, 2008; 16:30	Canada	6–3 (2–1, 2–0, 2–2)	Finland	Metro Centre, Halifax, Nova Scotia; Attendance: 9,178

Game reference
	Referees: Christer Lärking (Sweden); Marcus Vinnerborg (Sweden)
R. Getzlaf 00:33; S. Doan (SH1) 09:29; D. Heatley 30:17; P. Sharp (SH1) 38:12; S. Doan 41:07; D. Heatley 58:02 / Goals / 05:30 (SH1) A. Pihlström; 48:34 A. Pihlström; 59:37 T. Ruutu	Referees: Christer Lärking (Sweden); Marcus Vinnerborg (Sweden)

May 12, 2008; 20:15	Latvia	3–5 (1–1, 2–1, 0–3)	Germany	Metro Centre, Halifax, Nova Scotia; Attendance: 8,614

Game reference
	Referees: Danny Kurmann (Switzerland); Milan Minář (Czech Republic)
H. Vasiļjevs 05:01; M. Rēdlihs 25:48; M. Karsums 31:39 / Goals / 18:45 (PP1) C. Schmidt; 27:23 M. Wolf; 47:51 C. Schubert; 50:40 Y. Seidenberg; 52:51 C. Ullmann	Referees: Danny Kurmann (Switzerland); Milan Minář (Czech Republic)

== Relegation round ==
Teams finishing last in all four Preliminary round groups competed in the Relegation round in order to determine which two nations would be relegated to the IIHF World Championship Division I. The four teams were paired in two best-of-three series.

France defeated Italy, while Slovakia defeated Slovenia, both in 2 games, and secured themselves a place among the top sixteen hockey nations in the world. Italy and Slovenia were relegated to Division I for the 2009 tournament, and will be replaced by Austria and Hungary, the winners of the 2008 Division I tournament.

=== Group G ===
==== Series G1 ====
All times are local (UTC-4).

May 9, 2008; 19:00	France	3–2 (1–1, 1–0, 1–1)	Italy	Colisée Pepsi, Quebec City, Quebec; Attendance: 8,140

Game reference
	Referees: Chris Savage (Canada); Thomas Sterns (United States)
Y. Treille (PP1) 09:09; B. Amar 39:30; S. Bordeleau (PP1) 51:05 / Goals / 08:00 (PP1) J. Pittis; 59:52 A. Helfer	Referees: Chris Savage (Canada); Thomas Sterns (United States)

May 10, 2008; 20:15	Italy	4–6 (1–2, 1–1, 2–3)	France	Colisée Pepsi, Quebec City, Quebec; Attendance: 7,649

Game reference
	Referees: Rick Looker (United States); Sami Partanen (Finland)
J. Cirone 02:49; A. Signoretti (SH1) 26:12; P. Iannone 44:14; J. Pittis (PP1) 56:58 / Goals / 08:13 (PP1) B. Amar; 14:40 (PP2) Y. Treille; 24:44 J. Zwikel; 41:17 J. Desrosiers; 45:12 Y. Treille; 51:02 S. Bordeleau	Referees: Rick Looker (United States); Sami Partanen (Finland)

France won series 2 – 0

==== Series G2 ====
All times are local (UTC-3).

May 9, 2008; 16:30	Slovenia	1–5 (0–1, 1–4, 0–0)	Slovakia	Metro Centre, Halifax, Nova Scotia; Attendance: 8,473

Game reference
	Referees: Christer Larking (Sweden); Richard Schütz (Germany)
M. Robar 33:20 / Goals / 02:58 (PP2) R. Petrovický; 26:43 M. Hossa; 30:34 A. Podkonický; 35:56 A. Kollar; 36:32 I. Čiernik	Referees: Christer Larking (Sweden); Richard Schütz (Germany)

May 10, 2008; 20:15	Slovakia	4–3 GWS (1–0, 2–2, 0–1) (OT: 0–0) (SO: 2–1)	Slovenia	Metro Centre, Halifax, Nova Scotia; Attendance: 9,156

Game reference
	Referees: Milan Minář (Czech Republic); Marcus Vinnerborg (Sweden)
J. Kolník (PP1) 07:42; R. Petrovický (PP1) 31:25; Ľ. Višňovský 34:02; Ľ. Višňovský (GWG) 65:00 / Goals / 25:54 M. Manfreda; 38:39 D. Rodman; 55:05 A. Kopitar	Referees: Milan Minář (Czech Republic); Marcus Vinnerborg (Sweden)

Slovakia won series 2 – 0

== Playoff round ==
=== Draw ===
Quarterfinals
E2	Czech Republic	2
E3	Sweden	3
F1	Canada	8
F4	Norway	2
E1	Russia	6
E4	Switzerland	0
F3	United States	2
F2	Finland	3

Semifinals
QF1	Sweden	4
QF2	Canada	5
QF3	Russia	4
QF4	Finland	0

Finals
SF2	Canada	4
SF1	Russia	5
Bronze-medal game
SF1	Finland	4
SF2	Sweden	0

=== Quarter-finals ===
All times are local (Quebec: UTC-4, Halifax: UTC-3).

May 14, 2008; 13:00	Czech Republic	2–3 OT (0–0, 1–1, 1–1) (OT: 0–1)	Sweden	Colisée Pepsi, Quebec City, Quebec; Attendance: 9,787

Game reference
	Referees: Daniel Piechaczek (Germany); Jyri Rönn (Finland)
T. Rolinek 30:28; R. Vrbata (PS) 52:19 / Goals / 27:43 (PP1) P. Hörnqvist; 56:22 M. Nilson; 63:15 M. Weinhandl	Referees: Daniel Piechaczek (Germany); Jyri Rönn (Finland)

May 14, 2008; 16:30	Norway	2–8 (1–2, 1–3, 0–3)	Canada	Metro Centre, Halifax, Nova Scotia; Attendance: 9,192

Game reference
	Referees: Vyacheslav Bulanov (Russia); Alexander Poliakov (Russia)
M. Ask (PP2) 07:51; M. Olimb 25:32 / Goals / 00:37 D. Heatley; 11:02 (PP2) R. Getzlaf; 29:57 (PP1) J. Toews; 34:08 (PP1) D. Roy; 36:50 D. Roy; 44:10 (PP1) R. Nash; 50:44 R. Nash; 51:40 D. Roy	Referees: Vyacheslav Bulanov (Russia); Alexander Poliakov (Russia)

May 14, 2008; 19:15	Russia	6–0 (3–0, 3–0, 0–0)	Switzerland	Colisée Pepsi, Quebec City, Quebec; Attendance: 12,096

Game reference
	Referees: Peter Ország (Slovakia); Guy Pellerin (Canada)
A. Semin 01:14; M. Afinogenov 02:18; D. Zaripov (PP1) 06:23; S. Fedorov 21:22; M. Afinogenov 26:37; A. Ovechkin 38:07 / Goals	Referees: Peter Ország (Slovakia); Guy Pellerin (Canada)

May 14, 2008; 20:15	United States	2–3 OT (0–1, 0–1, 2–0) (OT: 0–1)	Finland	Metro Centre, Halifax, Nova Scotia; Attendance: 9,176

Game reference
	Referees: Christer Lärking (Sweden); Marcus Vinnerborg (Sweden)
P. Kessel 55:44; D. Stafford (SH1) 56:21 / Goals / 10:14 T. Ruutu; 25:45 (PP1) J. Niskala; 63:59 S. Lepistö	Referees: Christer Lärking (Sweden); Marcus Vinnerborg (Sweden)

=== Semi-finals ===
All times are local (UTC-4)

May 16, 2008; 13:00	Russia	4–0 (1–0, 1–0, 2–0)	Finland	Colisée Pepsi, Quebec City, Quebec; Attendance: 11,159

Game reference
	Referees: Danny Kurmann (Switzerland); Brent Reiber (Switzerland)
S. Fedorov 13:41; D. Zaripov 23:44; A. Morozov (PP1) 52:15; M. Sushinski (ENG) 57:56 / Goals	Referees: Danny Kurmann (Switzerland); Brent Reiber (Switzerland)

May 16, 2008; 17:00	Canada	5–4 (1–1, 4–2, 0–1)	Sweden	Colisée Pepsi, Quebec City, Quebec; Attendance: 13,026

Game reference
	Referees: Rick Looker (United States); Jyri Rönn (Finland)
D. Heatley (PP1) 05:35; R. Getzlaf (PP1) 23:58; J. Mayers 28:31; R. Nash 32:29; M. Green (PP2) 39:53 / Goals / 19:15 A. Strålman; 22:46 N. Wallin; 31:26 (PP1) A. Strålman; 54:21 F. Warg	Referees: Rick Looker (United States); Jyri Rönn (Finland)

=== Bronze-medal game ===
All times are local (UTC-4)

May 17, 2008; 15:00	Finland	4–0 (2–0, 0–0, 2–0)	Sweden	Colisée Pepsi, Quebec City, Quebec; Attendance: 12,009

Game reference
	Referees: Guy Pellerin (Canada); Daniel Piechaczek (Germany)
A. Pihlström 11:31; J. Niskala 13:44; A. Pihlström 42:18; M. Koivu (SH1, ENG) 57:35 / Goals	Referees: Guy Pellerin (Canada); Daniel Piechaczek (Germany)

=== Gold-medal game ===
All times are local (UTC-4)

May 18, 2008; 13:00	Canada	4–5 OT (3–1, 1–1, 0–2) (OT: 0–1)	Russia	Colisée Pepsi, Quebec City, Quebec; Attendance: 13,339

Game reference
	Referees: Christer Lärking (Sweden); Marcus Vinnerborg (Sweden)
B. Burns 03:54; C. Kunitz 09:17; B. Burns (PP2) 14:51; D. Heatley 29:56 / Goals / 01:23 A. Semin; 21:14 (PP1) A. Semin; 48:55 A. Tereshchenko; 54:46 I. Kovalchuk; 62:42 (PP1) I. Kovalchuk	Referees: Christer Lärking (Sweden); Marcus Vinnerborg (Sweden)

== Ranking and statistics ==
2008 IIHF World Championship winners

Russia
2nd/24th title

=== Tournament Awards ===
- Best players selected by the directorate:
  - Best Goaltender: (Russia) Evgeni Nabokov
  - Best Defenceman: (Canada) Brent Burns
  - Best Forward: (Canada) Dany Heatley
  - Most Valuable Player: (Canada) Dany Heatley
- Media All-Star Team:
  - Goaltender: (Russia) Evgeni Nabokov
  - Defence: (Canada) Mike Green, (Czech Republic) Tomáš Kaberle
  - Forward: (Canada) Dany Heatley, (Canada) Rick Nash, (Russia) Alexander Ovechkin

=== Final standings ===
The final standings of the tournament according to IIHF:

1st place, gold medalist(s)	Russia
2nd place, silver medalist(s)	Canada
3rd place, bronze medalist(s)	Finland
4	Sweden
5	Czech Republic
6	United States
7	Switzerland
8	Norway
9	Belarus
10	Germany
11	Latvia
12	Denmark
13	Slovakia
14	France
15	Slovenia
16	Italy

=== Scoring leaders ===
List shows the top 10 skaters sorted by points, then goals. If the list exceeds 10 skaters because of a tie in points, all of the tied skaters are left out.

Player	GP	G	A	Pts	+/-	PIM	POS
(Canada) Dany Heatley	9	12	8	20	+13	4	FW
(Canada) Ryan Getzlaf	9	3	11	14	+10	10	FW
(Canada) Rick Nash	9	6	7	13	+9	6	FW
(Russia) Alexander Semin	9	6	7	13	+11	8	FW
(Sweden) Mattias Weinhandl	9	5	8	13	+9	2	FW
(Russia) Alexander Ovechkin	9	6	6	12	+11	8	FW
(Russia) Sergei Fedorov	9	5	7	12	+10	8	FW
(Canada) Mike Green	9	4	8	12	+2	2	D
(United States) Phil Kessel	7	6	4	10	+4	6	FW
(Canada) Derek Roy	9	5	5	10	+4	6	FW

GP = Games played; G = Goals; A = Assists; Pts = Points; +/- = Plus/minus; PIM = Penalties in minutes; POS = Position

=== Leading goaltenders ===
Only the top 5 goaltenders, based on save percentage, who have played over 40% of their team's minutes are included in this list.

Player	TOI	SA	GA	GAA	Sv%	SO
(United States) Robert Esche	198:03	102	7	2.12	93.14	0
(Russia) Evgeni Nabokov	302:42	126	9	1.78	92.86	2
(Canada) Pascal Leclaire	240:00	107	8	2.00	92.52	1
(Finland) Niklas Bäckström	483:22	218	17	2.11	92.20	1
(Belarus) Vitali Koval	370:49	217	19	3.07	91.24	0

TOI = Time On Ice (minutes:seconds); SA = Shots against; GA = Goals against; GAA = Goals against average; Sv% = Save percentage; SO = Shutouts

== IIHF Broadcasting rights ==
- Austria: ORF Sport Plus
- Belarus: TV-First, LAD
- Canada
  - English: TSN
  - French: RDS
- Czech Republic: Czech Television
- Denmark: TV2 Sport
- Finland: YLE
- France: Sport+
- Germany: DSF
- Hungary: Sport 1, Sport 2
- Iceland: RÚV
- Internet: Webcast at IIHF.com
- Italy: Rai Sport Satellite
- Latvia: TV3 Latvia, TV6 Latvia, 3+ Latvia
- Norway:
  - Norwegian Matches: NRK
  - Other Matches: SportN
- Poland: Polsat
- Romania: Sport 1, Sport 2
- Russia: VGTRK Sport
- Slovakia: STV
- Slovenia: RTV Slovenija
- Sweden: Viasat
- Switzerland
  - German: SF zwei
  - French: TSR 2
  - Italian: TSI 2
- USA: World Championship Sports Network

== IIHF honors and awards ==
On the 100th anniversary of the IIHF's founding, an IIHF Centennial All-Star Team was chosen from the best international players at each position. The 2008 IIHF Hall of Fame induction ceremony has held in Quebec City during the World Championships. Juraj Okoličány of Slovakia was given the Paul Loicq Award for outstanding contributions to international ice hockey.

IIHF Hall of Fame inductees

- Art Berglund, United States
- Philippe Bozon, France
- Cammi Granato, United States
- Geraldine Heaney, Canada
- Angela James, Canada
- Igor Larionov, Russia
- Mario Lemieux, Canada

== See also ==
- 2008 Men's World Ice Hockey Championships
- 2008 IIHF World Championship Division I
- 2008 IIHF World Championship Division II
- 2008 IIHF World Championship Division III
- Juniors, Women's, Men's U18, Women's U18
