= Maxim Afinogenov =

Russian ice hockey player (born 1979)

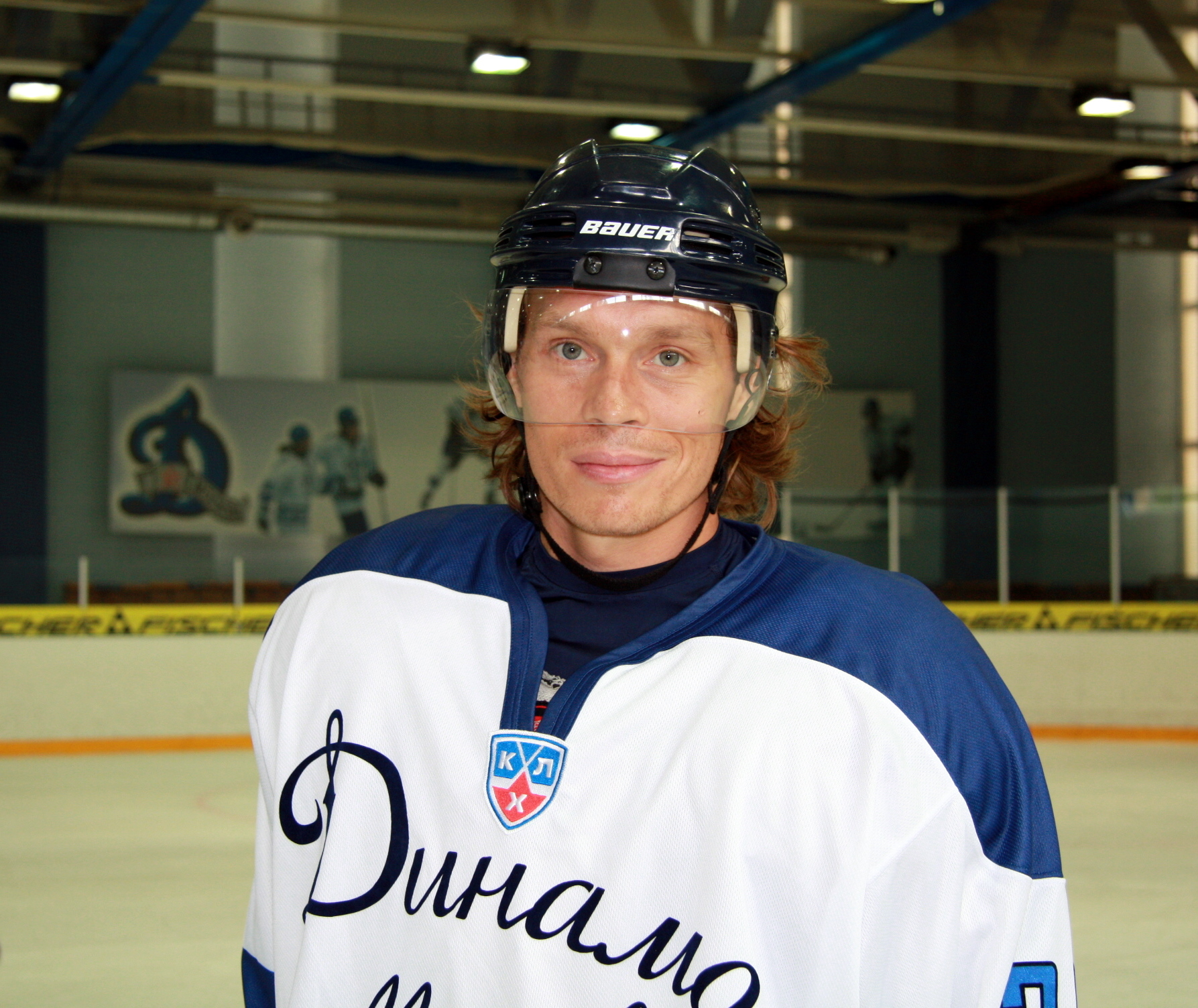
- Afinogenov with Dynamo Moscow in 2009
- Born: September 4, 1979 (age 46) Moscow, Russian SFSR, Soviet Union
- Height: 6 ft 0 in (183 cm)
- Weight: 190 lb (86 kg; 13 st 8 lb)
- Position: Right wing
- Shot: Left
- Played for: Dynamo Moscow; Buffalo Sabres; Atlanta Thrashers; SKA St. Petersburg; Vityaz Podolsk
- National team: Russia
- NHL draft: 69th overall, 1997; Buffalo Sabres
- Playing career: 1995–2020

Maxim Sergeyevich Afinogenov (Макси́м Серге́евич Афиноге́нов, IPA: [mɐkˈsʲim sʲɪrˈɡejɪvʲɪtɕ ɐfʲɪnɐˈɡʲenəf]; born September 4, 1979) is a Russian former professional ice hockey player. Known for his skating speed, he was drafted by the National Hockey League (NHL)'s Buffalo Sabres in the third round, 69th overall, in 1997 and played nine seasons with the club. He then played one season with the Atlanta Thrashers before signing and finishing his career in the Kontinental Hockey League (KHL).

== Personal life ==
Afinogenov was first introduced to hockey by his dad when he was five years old. As a youth, he played in the 1993 Quebec International Pee-Wee Hockey Tournament with a team from Moscow.

He married Russian former professional tennis player, Elena Dementieva on July 16, 2011. His sister Katia Afinogenov married retired Toronto Maple Leafs, Montreal Canadiens, Las Vegas Golden Knights, Carolina Hurricanes, Washington Capitals and HC Ambrì-Piotta left winger Max Pacioretty one week later.

== Playing career ==
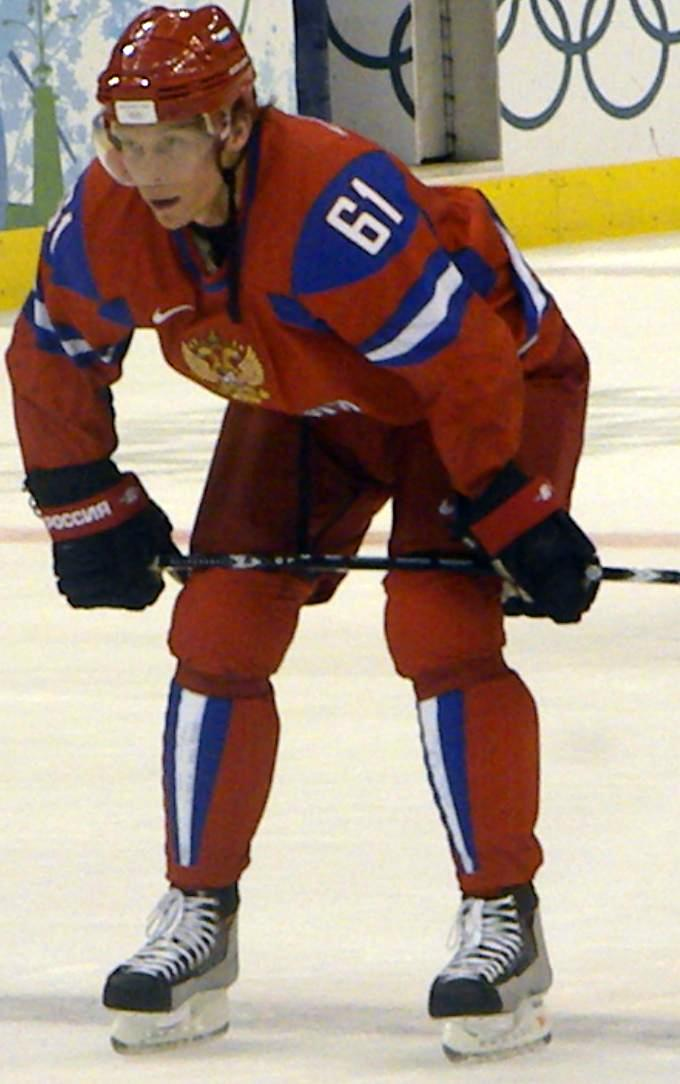

Medal record

Representing Russia

Ice hockey

World Championships
Gold medal – first place	2008	Canada
Silver medal – second place	2002	Sweden
Silver medal – second place	2010	Germany
Bronze medal – third place	2005	Austria

Winter Olympics
Bronze medal – third place	2002	Salt Lake City

World Junior Championships
Gold medal – first place	1999	Canada
Silver medal – second place	1998	Helsinki

=== Buffalo Sabres (1999–2009) ===
Afinogenov was a forward for Dynamo Moscow of the Russian Superleague (RSL) for four seasons. He was drafted 69th overall by the Buffalo Sabres in the 1997 NHL entry draft and played his rookie NHL season in 1999–2000, scoring 34 points in 65 games, while also playing in 15 games with the Sabres' American Hockey League (AHL) affiliate, the Rochester Americans. Following his third season with the Sabres, a 21-goal, 40-point campaign in 2001–02, Afinogenov re-signed with a two-year, $2.4 million contract on September 4, 2002. However, that same day, while playing a pickup game in Moscow, he took a puck to the head, suffering a concussion. He was limited to just 35 games in the subsequent season, managing just 11 points. The next season, in 2003–04, he recorded his first career hat-trick on December 31, 2003, at HSBC Arena in a 7–1 win against the Washington Capitals. He finished the season bouncing back from his previous concussion-riddled season with 17 goals and 31 points.

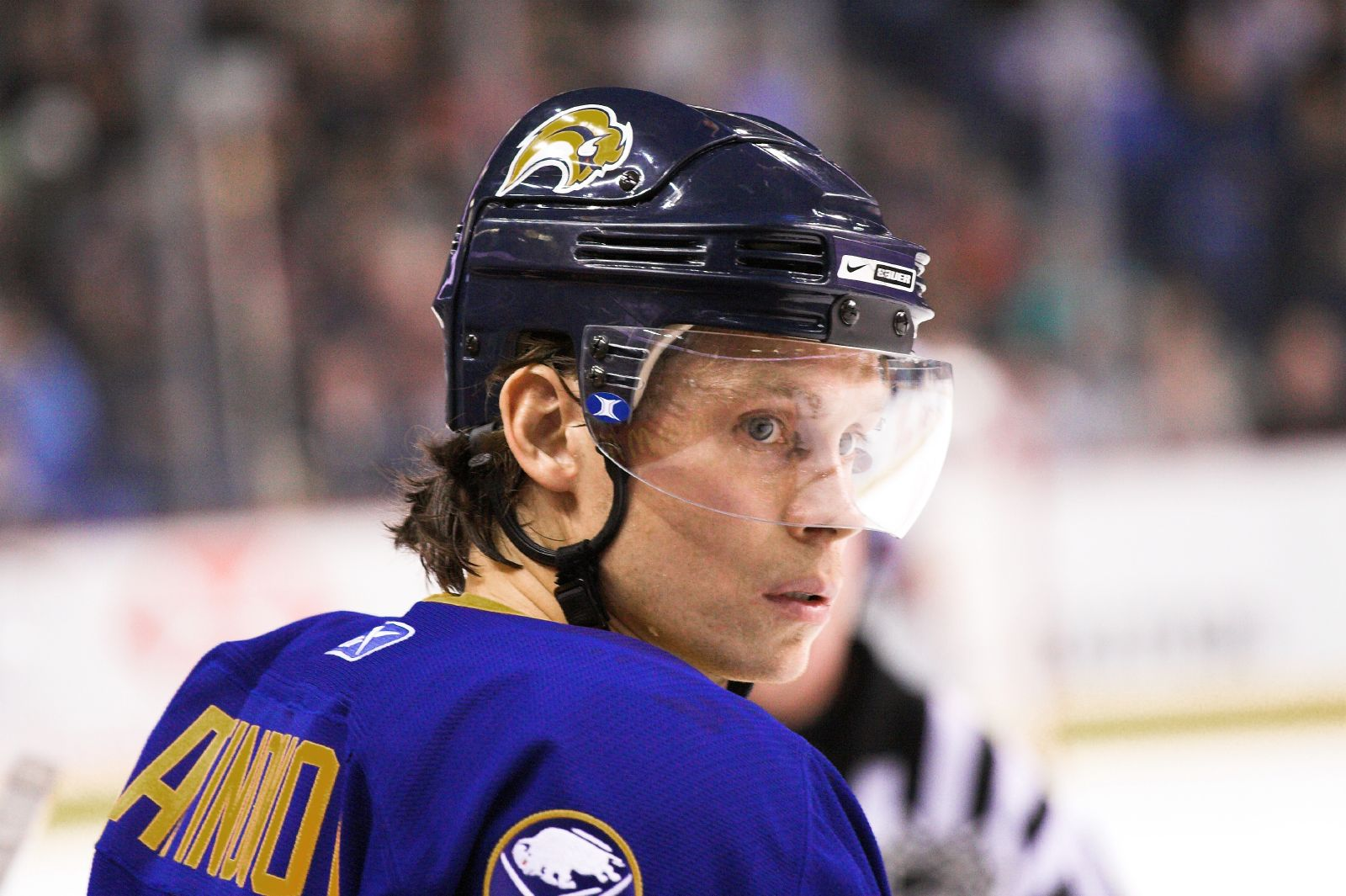
Afinogenov during a game in 2006.

After spending the 2004–05 season back in Russia with Dynamo Moscow due to the NHL lockout, Afinogenov recorded his best season to date when NHL play resumed in 2005–06 with personal bests of 51 assists and 73 points. As the Sabres embarked on a playoff run to the Conference Finals, where they were defeated in seven games by the eventual Stanley Cup champion Carolina Hurricanes. Afinogenov added eight points in 18 post-season games. He continued his scoring pace the following season in 2006–07 and, despite missing 26 games, scored 61 points and a career-high 23 goals. During the season, Sabres backup goalie Martin Biron was traded to the Philadelphia Flyers at the trade deadline in February 2007, making Afinogenov the longest-serving Sabre on the roster. In the playoffs, he scored the game-winning goal in Game 5 of the Sabres' second-round series against the Rangers in overtime. He scored five goals and four assists in 15 games as the Sabres advanced to the Conference Finals, where they lost to the Ottawa Senators in five games. His production tailed off in 2007–08, however, managing just 28 points in the same number of games as the previous season.

=== Atlanta Thrashers (2009–2010) ===
Following the 2008–09 season, in which he was sidelined once more with a groin injury, Afinogenov became an unrestricted free agent and was not re-signed by the Sabres. He left the club as the longest-serving Sabre on the previous season's roster, having played for the club since his rookie season in 1999–2000. On September 17, 2009, the Atlanta Thrashers invited Afinogenov to their 2009–10 training camp on a tryout. and on September 29, 2009, he signed a one-year contract with the team worth $800,000. He scored his first goal as a Thrasher on October 17, 2009, against the Buffalo Sabres. He finished the season finishing second on the team in points, behind only Nik Antropov.

=== KHL ===
Following the 2009–10 season, Afinogenov signed a five-year deal with SKA Saint Petersburg in the Kontinental Hockey League (KHL) as a free agent. After a productive first season with St. Petersburg, Afinogenov was plagued by injury in the following two seasons. He was traded to Podolsk-based HC Vityaz prior to the 2013–14 season and was announced as the team's captain.

== Career statistics ==
=== Regular season and playoffs ===
			Regular season					Playoffs
Season	Team	League	GP	G	A	Pts	PIM	GP	G	A	Pts	PIM
1995–96	Dynamo–2 Moscow	RUS-2	34	23	9	32	30	—	—	—	—	—
1995–96	Dynamo Moscow	IHL	1	0	0	0	0	—	—	—	—	—
1996–97	Dynamo Moscow	RSL	29	6	5	11	10	4	0	2	2	0
1997–98	Dynamo Moscow	RSL	35	10	5	15	53	—	—	—	—	—
1998–99	Dynamo Moscow	RSL	38	8	13	21	24	16	10	6	16	14
1998–99	Dynamo–2 Moscow	RUS-2	1	1	2	3	2	—	—	—	—	—
1999–00	Rochester Americans	AHL	15	6	12	18	8	8	3	1	4	4
1999–00	Buffalo Sabres	NHL	65	16	18	34	41	5	0	1	1	2
2000–01	Buffalo Sabres	NHL	78	14	22	36	40	11	2	3	5	4
2001–02	Buffalo Sabres	NHL	81	21	19	40	69	—	—	—	—	—
2002–03	Buffalo Sabres	NHL	35	5	6	11	21	—	—	—	—	—
2003–04	Buffalo Sabres	NHL	73	17	14	31	57	—	—	—	—	—
2004–05	Dynamo Moscow	RSL	36	13	14	27	91	10	4	4	8	8
2005–06	Buffalo Sabres	NHL	77	22	51	73	84	18	3	5	8	10
2006–07	Buffalo Sabres	NHL	56	23	38	61	66	15	5	4	9	6
2007–08	Buffalo Sabres	NHL	56	10	18	28	42	—	—	—	—	—
2008–09	Buffalo Sabres	NHL	48	6	14	20	20	—	—	—	—	—
2009–10	Atlanta Thrashers	NHL	82	24	37	61	46	—	—	—	—	—
2010–11	SKA St. Petersburg	KHL	51	13	20	33	50	11	4	1	5	10
2011–12	SKA St. Petersburg	KHL	23	4	8	12	36	12	3	1	4	4
2012–13	SKA St. Petersburg	KHL	26	4	4	8	4	13	1	3	4	6
2013–14	Vityaz Podolsk	KHL	53	12	14	26	69	—	—	—	—	—
2014–15	Vityaz Podolsk	KHL	54	17	10	27	124	—	—	—	—	—
2015–16	Vityaz Podolsk	KHL	56	15	13	28	34	—	—	—	—	—
2016–17	Vityaz Podolsk	KHL	58	20	27	47	44	4	0	2	2	6
2017–18	Vityaz Podolsk	KHL	47	16	20	36	25	—	—	—	—	—
2018–19	Dynamo Moscow	KHL	10	4	1	5	10	—	—	—	—	—
2019–20	Dynamo Moscow	KHL	37	8	2	10	34	2	1	0	1	0
KHL totals			415	113	119	232	459	42	9	7	16	26
NHL totals			651	158	237	395	486	49	10	13	23	22

=== International ===
Year	Team	Event	GP	G	A	Pts	PIM
1996	Russia	EJC	5	1	1	2	0
1997	Russia	EJC	6	4	3	7	18
1998	Russia	WJC	7	3	2	5	4
1999	Russia	WJC	7	3	5	8	0
1999	Russia	WC	6	2	1	3	2
2000	Russia	WC	6	1	0	1	4
2002	Russia	OLY	6	2	2	4	4
2002	Russia	WC	9	3	0	3	6
2004	Russia	WC	5	1	1	2	4
2004	Russia	WCH	4	0	1	1	2
2005	Russia	WC	9	3	2	5	6
2006	Russia	OLY	8	1	0	1	10
2008	Russia	WC	8	5	1	6	2
2010	Russia	OLY	4	1	1	2	0
2010	Russia	WC	9	3	4	7	18
2011	Russia	WC	9	1	2	3	6
Junior totals			25	11	11	22	22
Senior totals			83	23	15	38	64
