= Mike Green (ice hockey, born 1985) =

Canadian ice hockey player (born 1985)

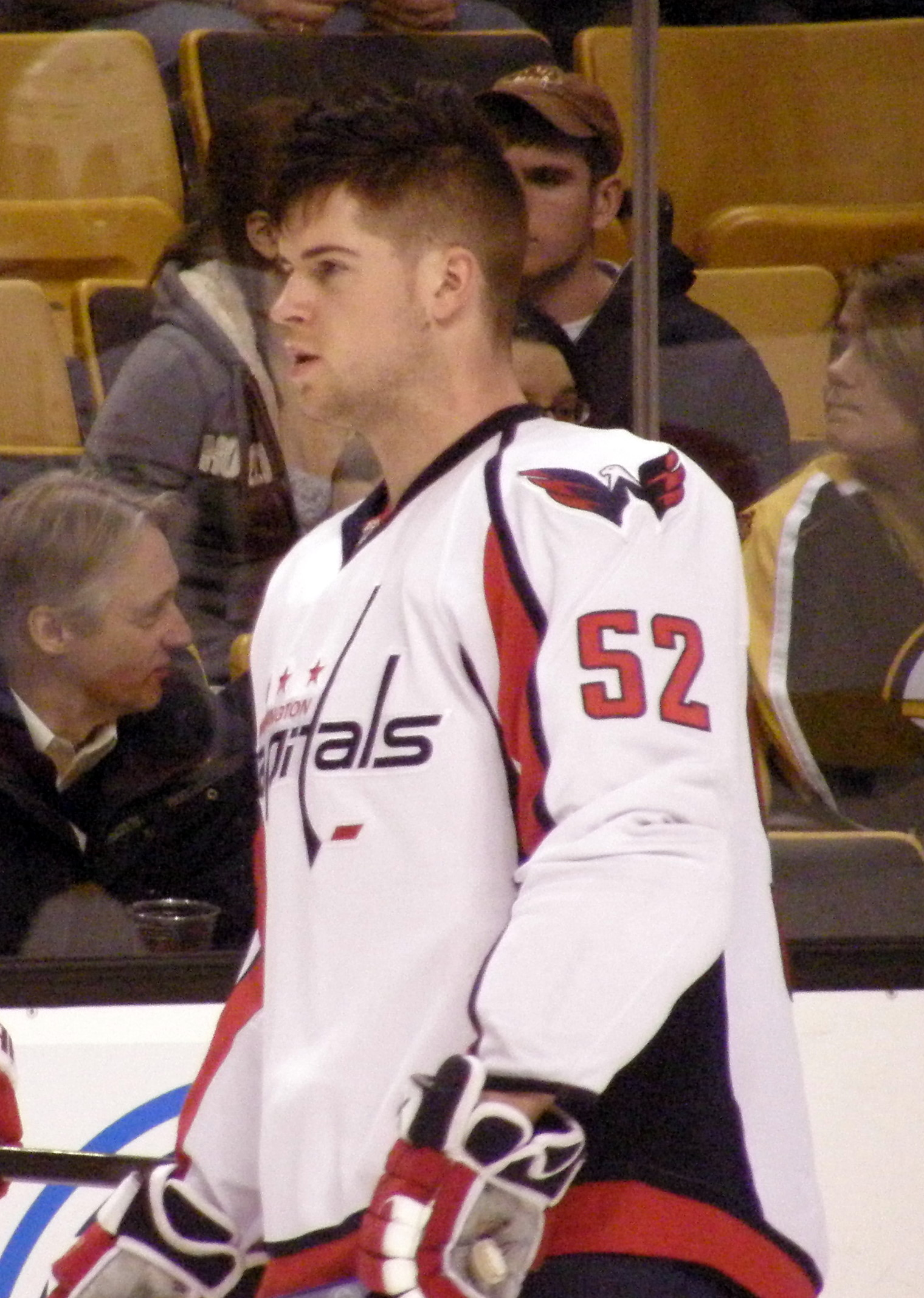
- Green with the Washington Capitals in January 2009
- Born: October 12, 1985 (age 40) Calgary, Alberta, Canada
- Height: 6 ft 1 in (185 cm)
- Weight: 207 lb (94 kg; 14 st 11 lb)
- Position: Defence
- Shot: Right
- Played for: Washington Capitals; Detroit Red Wings; Edmonton Oilers
- NHL draft: 29th overall, 2004; Washington Capitals
- Playing career: 2005–2020

Michael David Green (born October 12, 1985) is a Canadian former professional ice hockey defenceman who played in the National Hockey League (NHL) with the Washington Capitals, Detroit Red Wings and Edmonton Oilers.

Known for his hard slapshot and goal-scoring offense during his ten-year tenure with the Capitals, Green put up impressive offensive statistics for a defenceman from 2007 to 2010. During this time, he earned the nickname "Game Over Green" for his propensity to score game-winning goals.

== Playing career ==
=== Minor ===
Green played his minor hockey career with the NASA Hockey Association, in Calgary, Alberta. He played major junior in the Western Hockey League (WHL) for five full seasons with the Saskatoon Blades. After a 14-goal, 39-point season in 2003–04, he was drafted in the first round, 29th overall, by the Washington Capitals in the 2004 NHL entry draft.

=== Professional (2005–2020) ===
==== Washington Capitals (2005–2015) ====
In 2005–06, Green split the season with the Capitals and their American Hockey League (AHL) affiliate, the Hershey Bears. He scored his first career NHL goal against Ed Belfour of the Toronto Maple Leafs on February 3, 2006, and finished with three points in 22 games for the Capitals. The next season, 2006–07, Green was selected to play in the 2007 NHL YoungStars Game for the Eastern Conference, where he registered three assists despite playing with a bruised foot. Not having played the 25-game minimum to qualify as a rookie the previous season, the 2006–07 season counted as Green's rookie campaign. He completed his second season with 12 points in 70 games, while still appearing in 12 games in the AHL with the Bears.

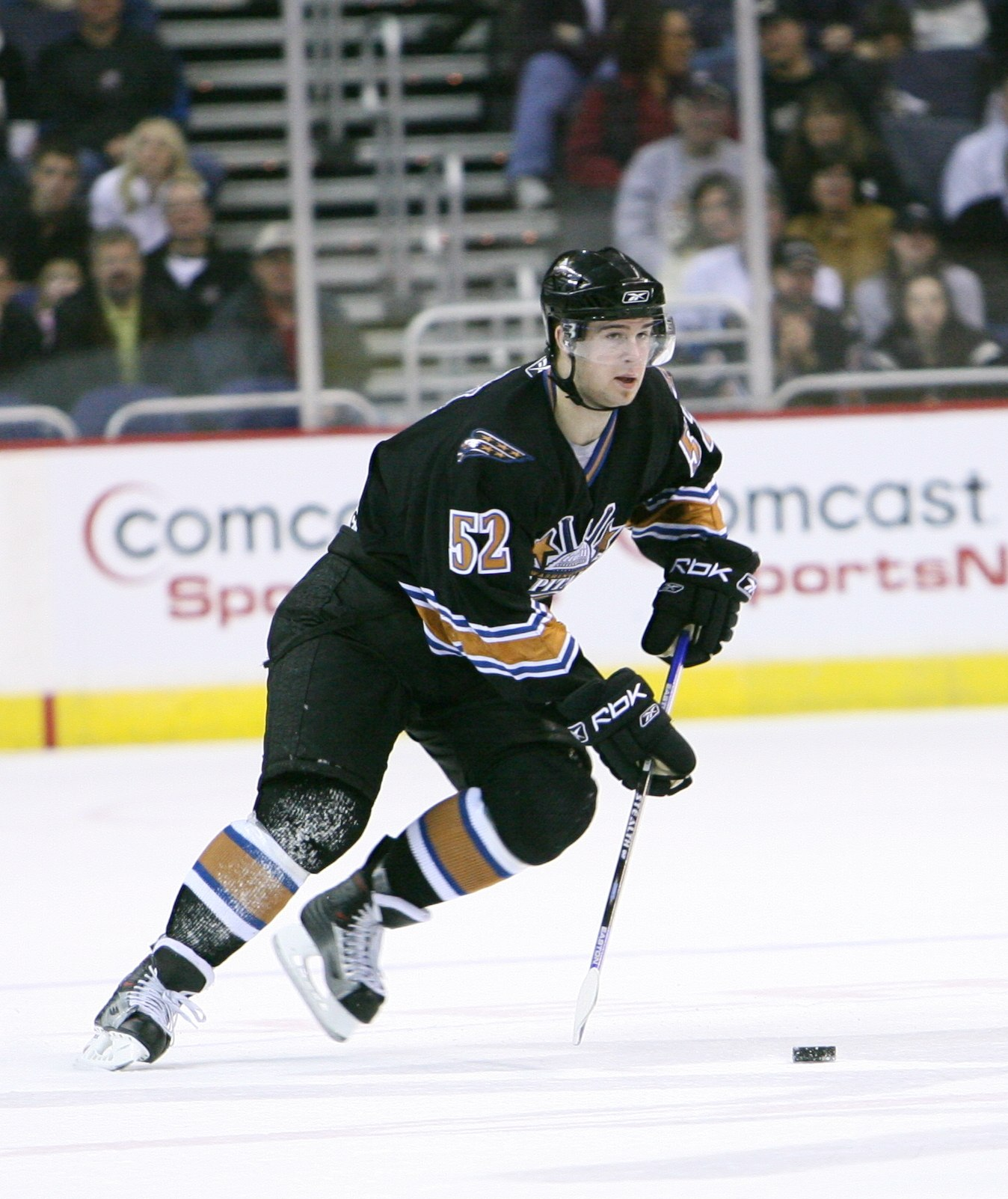
Green in 2007

In 2007–08, Green emerged as an elite offensive NHL defenceman while playing on a young and talented Washington team which included forwards Alexander Ovechkin, Alexander Semin and Nicklas Bäckström. Green earned the nickname "Game Over," made popular by play-by-play announcer Joe Beninati after his game-winning goals in the last minutes of the third period or overtime became a regular occurrence. Green finished the season with four game-winning goals to go with his NHL-leading 18 goals among defencemen and 56 points. Green did not start his goal-scoring run until after Bruce Boudreau replaced Glen Hanlon as head coach on Thanksgiving Day, 2007. That season, the Capitals made the Stanley Cup playoffs for the first time since 2003, and in his first career NHL playoff game on April 11, 2008, against the Philadelphia Flyers, Green brought Washington back from a 4–2 deficit with two goals in the third period. The Capitals eventually won the game on an Ovechkin game-winning goal. Known for his very powerful and heavy shot, Green took a slapshot from the blue line that same game that was blocked by Philadelphia's Patrick Thoresen; the shot broke Thoresen's protective cup and nearly ruptured a testicle, and he had to be taken to a local hospital, missing the next game. After the game, Green called Thoresen to check in on him. In Game 3, on April 15, Green recorded a Gordie Howe hat trick (a goal, an assist and a fight) in a 6–3 loss to the Philadelphia Flyers. The series went the distance, but the Capitals would lose in the seventh game.

During the 2008 playoffs, Green's signature "faux hawk" hairstyle received increased publicity as his profile in the NHL was raised. An Elliot in the Morning promotion, "Rawk the Hawk," had Green into the studio for the haircut, which willing fans could also have done for playoff tickets. The D.C. morning talk radio show brought this promotion back for the 2009 season, offering tickets for the first game of each new series. Additionally, during the season, an unofficial Green fan club, dubbed the "Gang Green" began showing up to home games wearing dark green T-shirts with "Gang Green" written on the front and Green's nickname, "GAME OVER," as the name plate on the back above the number 52.

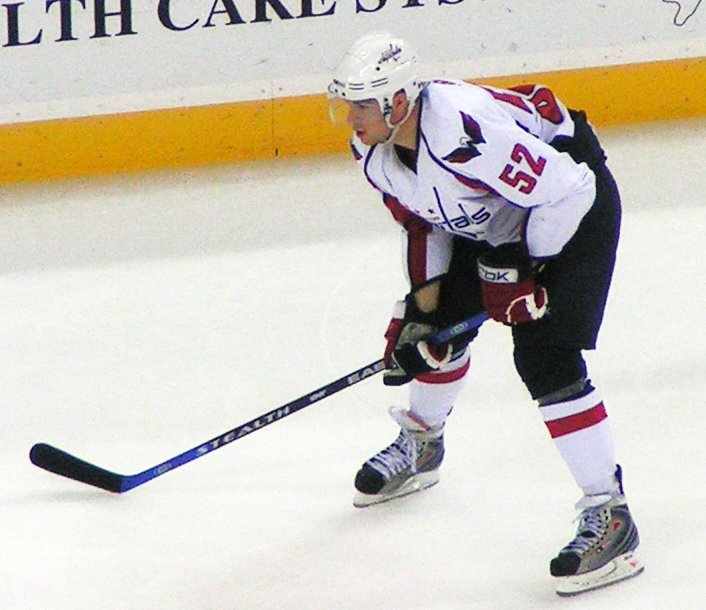
Green with the Capitals on November 15, 2008.

At the end of the season, on May 21, 2008, Green was named to the Sporting News' NHL All-Star team along with teammate Alexander Ovechkin. Later in the summer, Green signed a four-year contract extension with the Capitals, on July 1, averaging to $5.25 million per year.

Green picked up where he left off in 2008–09, but was plagued by injuries early in the season. Returning from the sidelines, Green captured back-to-back NHL Third Stars of the Week for the weeks ending February 1 and 8, 2009. On February 14, Green scored in his eighth consecutive game, setting the NHL record for most consecutive games with a goal by a defenceman. The former record was set by Mike O'Connell in the 1983–84 season. Then, after receiving a Second Star of the Week for the week ending March 23, he became just the eighth defenceman in history to score 30 goals in a season in a game against the New York Islanders on April 1. Finishing with 31 goals on the season, Green tallied 18 on the power play, one short of Sheldon Souray's 2006–07 record of 19.

In April 2009, Green was nominated for the James Norris Memorial Trophy for the NHL's top defenceman, along with Zdeno Chára and Nicklas Lidström. Green has been nominated for the award twice.

In 2009–10, Green set a career-high with 76 points. He missed a lot of time during the following two seasons due to various injuries.

On July 16, 2012, Green signed a three-year contract extension worth $18.25 million to stay with the Capitals.

In the 2012–13 NHL season, Green led all NHL defencemen in goals scored with 12.

In the 2013–14 season, Green was demoted to Washington's second power play unit. The emergence of John Carlson led to less ice time for "Game Over Green".

In the 2014-15 season, Green played bottom pairing minutes mainly alongside defensive partner Nate Schmidt. Green periodically got more ice time on the first power play unit and was able to have a respectable offensive season with 45 points. Still a far-cry from his output in previous years, Green played an integral role in the capitals playoff run with the services of Dmitry Orlov being unavailable for the entire season.

==== Detroit Red Wings (2015–2020) ====
On July 1, 2015, the Detroit Red Wings signed Green to a three-year, $18 million contract.

On October 17, 2016, Green notched his first career hat trick against Andrew Hammond of the Ottawa Senators.

During the 2017–18 season, Green was named to the NHL All-Star Game for the second time in his career after leading team defencemen in scoring and ranking fourth overall on the team. Green's season was cut short in March when he was ruled out for the rest of the season due to his injuries.

On June 30, 2018, the Red Wings resigned Green to a two-year, $10.75 million contract. After playing in 43 games the following season, Green was announced to be sitting out the rest of the year to recover from a virus on March 7, 2019. During the 2019–20 season, Green recorded three goals and eights assists in 48 games for the Red Wings.

==== Edmonton Oilers (2020) ====
On February 24, 2020, Green was traded to the Edmonton Oilers in exchange for Kyle Brodziak and a conditional fourth-round pick in 2020. He skated in two games for the team before suffering a sprained medial collateral ligament (MCL).

Green decided to opt out of the league's return to play program after the season was suspended due to the COVID-19 pandemic. On August 26, 2020, Green announced his retirement in an interview with The Athletic.

== International play ==
Medal record

Representing Canada

Ice hockey

World Championships
Silver medal – second place	2008 Canada	

Following his break-out season with the Capitals, Green debuted for Team Canada at the 2008 IIHF World Championship as the host country. He recorded 12 points in eight games as Canada went on to win a silver medal, losing to Russia in overtime in the gold medal game. Green was named to the tournament All-Star team. He was also selected for the 2010 Winter Olympics summer roster for Team Canada in August 2009 and considered a favourite, but did not make the final roster cut.

== Off the ice ==
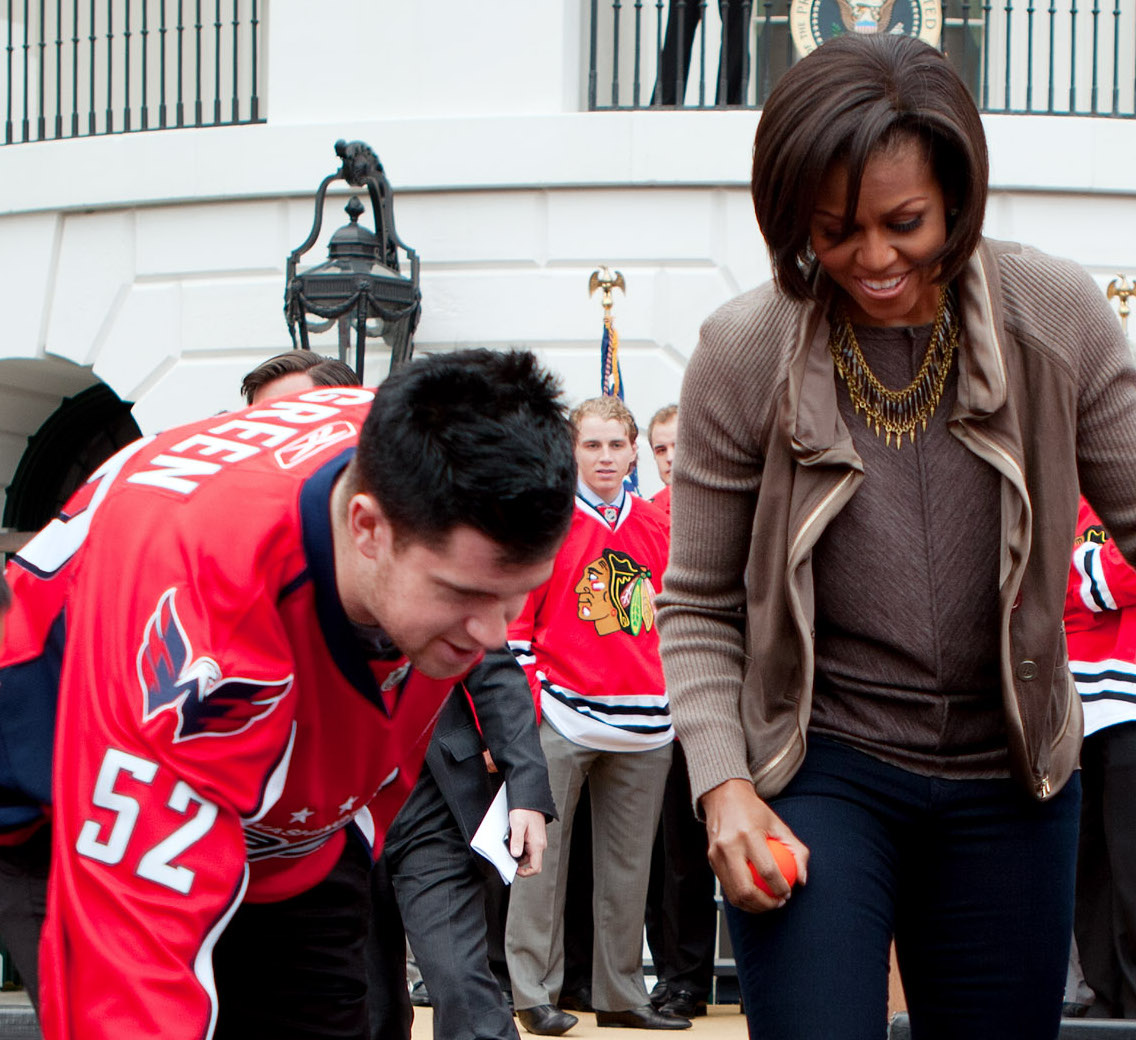
Green joins First Lady of the United States Michelle Obama at the White House in 2011 to promote her Let's Move! initiative

Green is involved in a number of community organizations and events. He is raising money for Children's National Medical Center as part of America's Giving Challenge, sponsored by Parade magazine. He also participated with Alexander Ovechkin in speaking at a local middle school and participating in a game of floor hockey. Green also has a program called "Green's Gang," where he purchases seven season tickets and donates them to Most Valuable Kids, a non-profit organization that works with underprivileged kids and active military. In 2008, Green founded a charity called So Kids Can with Elliot Segal, host of DC101's Elliot in the Morning. During the 2011–12 season, the group raised money to construct a playground at Hopkins-Tancil Court in Old Town Alexandria (Virginia). Working with KaBOOM!, a national non-profit dedicated to building playgrounds, the Alexandria Redevelopment and Housing Authority, and over 200 Washington Capitals fans and community volunteers, Green and Segal oversaw the construction of that playground. The S.T.A.R.S playground held its official opening on September 19, 2012. So Kids Can has raised over $200,000 since its founding. On August 9, 2014, Green married his longtime girlfriend, Courtney Parrie and the couple have three children together.

== Records ==
- Longest consecutive goal scoring streak by a defenceman — 8 games in 2008–09 (surpassed Mike O'Connell, 7 games in 1983–84)

== Career statistics ==
=== Regular season and playoffs ===
			Regular season					Playoffs
Season	Team	League	GP	G	A	Pts	PIM	GP	G	A	Pts	PIM
2000–01	Saskatoon Blades	WHL	7	0	2	2	0	—	—	—	—	—
2001–02	Saskatoon Blades	WHL	62	3	20	23	57	7	0	1	1	2
2002–03	Saskatoon Blades	WHL	72	6	36	42	70	6	0	2	2	6
2003–04	Saskatoon Blades	WHL	59	14	25	39	92	—	—	—	—	—
2004–05	Saskatoon Blades	WHL	67	14	52	66	105	4	0	0	0	6
2005–06	Hershey Bears	AHL	56	9	34	43	79	21	3	15	18	30
2005–06	Washington Capitals	NHL	22	1	2	3	18	—	—	—	—	—
2006–07	Hershey Bears	AHL	12	3	5	8	26	19	7	9	16	38
2006–07	Washington Capitals	NHL	70	2	10	12	36	—	—	—	—	—
2007–08	Washington Capitals	NHL	82	18	38	56	62	7	3	4	7	15
2008–09	Washington Capitals	NHL	68	31	42	73	68	14	1	8	9	12
2009–10	Washington Capitals	NHL	75	19	57	76	54	7	0	3	3	12
2010–11	Washington Capitals	NHL	49	8	16	24	48	8	1	5	6	8
2011–12	Washington Capitals	NHL	32	3	4	7	12	14	2	2	4	10
2012–13	Washington Capitals	NHL	35	12	14	26	20	7	2	2	4	4
2013–14	Washington Capitals	NHL	70	9	29	38	64	—	—	—	—	—
2014–15	Washington Capitals	NHL	72	10	35	45	34	14	0	2	2	14
2015–16	Detroit Red Wings	NHL	74	7	28	35	38	5	1	1	2	10
2016–17	Detroit Red Wings	NHL	72	14	22	36	40	—	—	—	—	—
2017–18	Detroit Red Wings	NHL	66	8	25	33	38	—	—	—	—	—
2018–19	Detroit Red Wings	NHL	43	5	21	26	28	—	—	—	—	—
2019–20	Detroit Red Wings	NHL	48	3	8	11	32	—	—	—	—	—
2019–20	Edmonton Oilers	NHL	2	0	0	0	0	—	—	—	—	—
NHL totals			880	150	351	501	592	76	10	27	37	85

=== International ===
Year	Team	Event	Result	GP	G	A	Pts	PIM
2002	Canada	U18	1st place, gold medalist(s)	5	0	2	2	2
2003	Canada	WJC18	1st place, gold medalist(s)	7	0	0	0	2
2008	Canada	WC	2nd place, silver medalist(s)	9	4	8	12	2
Junior totals				12	0	2	2	4
Senior totals				9	4	8	12	2

== Awards and honours ==
Award	Year
WHL
CHL Top Prospects Game	2004
East first All-Star team	2005
AHL
All-Rookie team	2006
Calder Cup (Hershey Bears)	2006
NHL
NHL YoungStars Game	2007
First All-Star team	2009, 2010
All-Star Game	2011, 2018
International
WC All-Star team	2008

Awards and achievements
Preceded by Jeff Schultz	Washington Capitals first-round draft pick 2004	Succeeded by Sasha Pokulok
