= Aleš Kotalík =

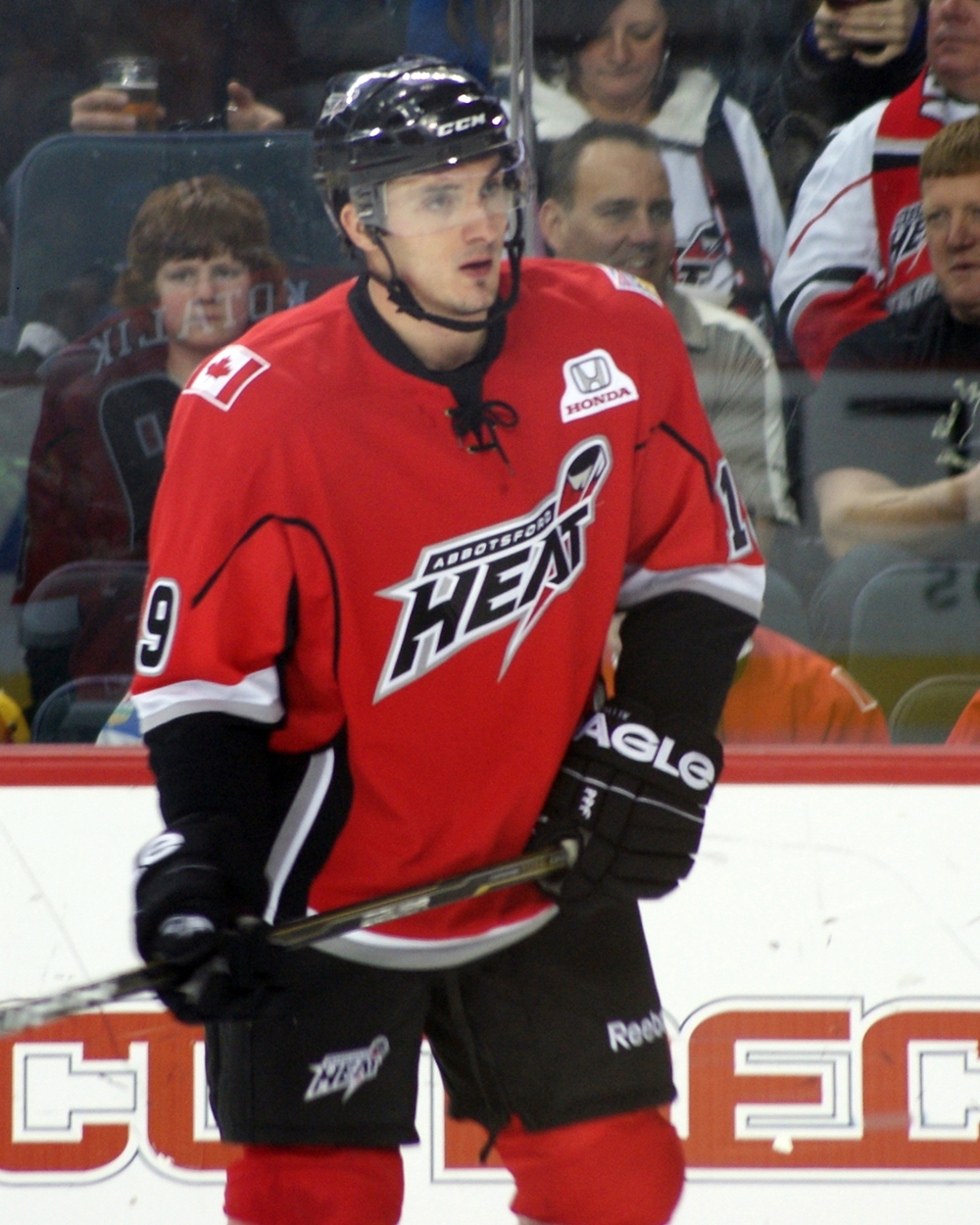
- Born: 23 December 1978 (age 47) Jindřichův Hradec, Czechoslovakia
- Height: 6 ft 1 in (185 cm)
- Weight: 225 lb (102 kg; 16 st 1 lb)
- Position: Right wing
- Shot: Right
- Played for: NHL: Buffalo Sabres; Edmonton Oilers; New York Rangers; Calgary Flames; Czech: HC České Budějovice; HC Bílí Tygři Liberec
- National team: Czech Republic
- NHL draft: 164th overall, 1998; Buffalo Sabres
- Playing career: 1997–2013

Aleš Kotalík (born 23 December 1978) is a Czech former professional ice hockey right winger who played nine seasons in the National Hockey League (NHL) for the Buffalo Sabres, Edmonton Oilers, New York Rangers, and Calgary Flames.

== Playing career ==
Kotalík was drafted 164th overall by the Buffalo Sabres in the 1998 NHL entry draft. In the 2005–06 NHL season, he had a career high in 25 goals, 37 assists and 62 points. The recent 2006–07 NHL season he was 5 for 7 in shootouts and second in the NHL with four shootout deciding goals. He was out for 16 games because of an injured right knee. In the Calgary Flames All-Star games, he showed his ability to strike hard with a slap shot speed of 105.3 being the second hardest shooter in the NHL.

On 4 March 2009, Kotalík was traded by the Sabres to the Edmonton Oilers in exchange for a 2nd-round pick in the 2009 NHL entry draft. Kotalík finished the season in Edmonton before being signed as a free agent by the New York Rangers on 9 July 2009 to a three-year, $9 million contract. Due to his lack of goal scoring, which he was expected to bring and being a healthy scratch for numerous games, he was traded on 1 February 2010 to the Calgary Flames along with Chris Higgins in exchange for Olli Jokinen and Brandon Prust.

Placed on waivers in the off-season by the Calgary Flames, Kotalík cleared waivers on 29 June 2010. At the time, he had two years and $6 million remaining on his contract. On 27 January 2011, he was placed back on waivers by the Flames and subsequently assigned to the Abbotsford Heat of the American Hockey League. On 25 June, along with Robyn Regehr and a second round 2012 draft pick, Kotalík was traded back to the Sabres for Paul Byron and Chris Butler.

On 24 September 2011, Kotalík was placed on waivers by the Buffalo Sabres in a salary cap move. After initially reporting to the Rochester Americans, Kotalík instead returned to his hometown in the Czech Republic to play for HC Mountfield České Budějovice.

== International play ==
Medal record

Representing Czech Republic

Ice hockey

Winter Olympics
Bronze medal – third place	2006 Turin	

Kotalík played his first game for the national team in 2000, and has played 21 times for the Czech national team including the 2006 Winter Olympics and the 2008 and 2009 World Championships.

== Career statistics ==
=== Regular season and playoffs ===
			Regular season					Playoffs
Season	Team	League	GP	G	A	Pts	PIM	GP	G	A	Pts	PIM
1995–96	HC České Budějovice	CZE Jr	28	6	7	13	—	—	—	—	—	—
1996–97	HC České Budějovice	CZE Jr	36	15	16	31	24	—	—	—	—	—
1997–98	HC České Budějovice	ELH	45	9	6	15	14	—	—	—	—	—
1998–99	HC České Budějovice	ELH	39	7	13	20	16	3	0	0	0	0
1999–00	HC České Budějovice	ELH	43	7	12	19	34	3	0	1	1	6
1999–00	SHC Vajgar Jindřichův Hradec	CZE II	2	2	2	4	2	—	—	—	—	—
2000–01	HC České Budějovice	ELH	52	19	29	48	54	—	—	—	—	—
2001–02	Rochester Americans	AHL	68	18	25	43	55	1	0	0	0	0
2001–02	Buffalo Sabres	NHL	13	1	3	4	2	—	—	—	—	—
2002–03	Rochester Americans	AHL	8	0	2	2	4	—	—	—	—	—
2002–03	Buffalo Sabres	NHL	68	21	14	35	30	—	—	—	—	—
2003–04	Buffalo Sabres	NHL	62	15	11	26	41	—	—	—	—	—
2004–05	Bílí Tygři Liberec	ELH	25	8	8	16	46	12	2	5	7	12
2005–06	Buffalo Sabres	NHL	82	25	37	62	62	18	4	7	11	8
2006–07	Buffalo Sabres	NHL	66	16	22	38	62	16	2	2	4	8
2007–08	Buffalo Sabres	NHL	79	23	20	43	58	—	—	—	—	—
2008–09	Buffalo Sabres	NHL	56	13	19	32	28	—	—	—	—	—
2008–09	Edmonton Oilers	NHL	19	7	4	11	6	—	—	—	—	—
2009–10	New York Rangers	NHL	45	8	14	22	38	—	—	—	—	—
2009–10	Calgary Flames	NHL	26	3	2	5	29	—	—	—	—	—
2010–11	Calgary Flames	NHL	26	4	2	6	8	—	—	—	—	—
2010–11	Abbotsford Heat	AHL	25	6	12	18	10	—	—	—	—	—
2011–12	HC Mountfield	ELH	30	8	16	24	20	5	1	3	4	0
2012–13	ČEZ Motor České Budějovice	ELH	51	14	22	36	70	5	0	1	1	16
2013–14	ČEZ Motor České Budějovice	CZE II	51	16	15	31	38	—	—	—	—	—
NHL totals			542	136	148	284	348	34	6	9	15	16
ELH totals			285	72	106	178	254	28	3	10	13	34

=== International ===
Year	Team	Event	GP	G	A	Pts	PIM
1998	Czech Republic	WJC	7	3	1	4	0
2006	Czech Republic	OG	4	0	0	0	0
2008	Czech Republic	WC	7	5	2	7	0
2009	Czech Republic	WC	7	2	1	3	4
Senior totals			18	7	3	10	4
