= Thierry Paterlini =

Swiss ice hockey player

- Born: 27 April 1975 (age 49); Chur, SUI
- Height: 6 ft 0 in (183 cm)
- Weight: 209 lb (95 kg; 14 st 13 lb)
- Position: Left wing
- Shot: Left
- Played for: Grasshopper Club Zürich; SC Bern; HC Davos; ZSC Lions; HC Lugano; SC Rapperswil-Jona Lakers; HC Sierre
- National team: Switzerland
- Playing career: 1992–2013

Thierry Paterlini (born 27 April 1975 in Chur, Graubünden) is a Swiss professional ice hockey defenceman. He currently plays for the ZSC Lions of the Swiss National League A. He first played professionally in the National League B with Grasshopper Club Zürich in 1993. Paterlini debuted in the top league in 1996 for SC Bern. He played four seasons with Bern, four with HC Davos, three with the ZSC Lions, and two with HC Lugano.

Seger was selected to play for the Switzerland men's national ice hockey team at the 2010 Winter Olympics. He previously represented Switzerland at the 1994 and 1995 IIHF World U20 Championships, the 1997, 2002, 2003, 2004, 2005, 2006, 2007, 2008, and 2009 Ice Hockey World Championship, and the 2006 Winter Olympics.

== Career statistics ==
=== Regular season and playoffs ===
			Regular season					Playoffs
Season	Team	League	GP	G	A	Pts	PIM	GP	G	A	Pts	PIM
1991–92	EHC Kloten	SUI U20
1992–93	Grasshopper Club Zürich	SUI.2 U20
1992–93	Grasshopper Club Zürich	SUI.3
1993–94	Grasshopper Club Zürich	SUI U20
1993–94	Grasshopper Club Zürich	SUI.2	31	7	4	11	26	4	0	0	0	4
1994–95	Grasshopper Club Zürich	SUI.2	34	8	9	17	82	12	3	2	5	26
1995–96	Grasshopper Club Zürich	SUI.2	35	20	20	40	52	10	5	6	11	16
1996–97	SC Bern	NDA	46	8	15	23	50	13	2	1	3	10
1997–98	SC Bern	NDA	36	6	7	13	49	7	0	2	2	12
1998–99	SC Bern	NDA	27	6	3	9	59	6	0	0	0	4
1999–2000	SC Bern	NLA	45	6	4	10	32	5	0	0	0	6
2000–01	HC Davos	NLA	40	9	15	24	118	4	0	1	1	4
2001–02	HC Davos	NLA	28	4	8	12	30	16	1	4	5	10
2002–03	HC Davos	NLA	31	4	11	15	94	17	3	3	6	12
2003–04	HC Davos	NLA	46	10	15	25	42	6	0	1	1	6
2004–05	ZSC Lions	NLA	41	6	11	17	42	15	4	3	7	18
2005–06	ZSC Lions	NLA	25	3	7	10	41	—	—	—	—	—
2006–07	ZSC Lions	NLA	39	5	5	10	104	7	2	0	2	2
2007–08	HC Lugano	NLA	49	6	9	15	40	—	—	—	—	—
2008–09	HC Lugano	NLA	45	16	6	22	46	2	0	0	0	0
2009–10	Rapperswil–Jona Lakers	NLA	46	6	11	17	52	—	—	—	—	—
2010–11	ZSC Lions	NLA	30	4	2	6	14	—	—	—	—	—
2011–12	HC Sierre	SUI.2	10	2	0	2	44	—	—	—	—	—
2012–13	HC Sierre	SUI.2	38	7	7	14	78	—	—	—	—	—
NDA/NLA totals			574	99	129	228	813	98	12	15	27	84

=== International ===
Year	Team	Event	GP	G	A	Pts	PIM
1993	Switzerland	EJC B	6	3	4	7	14
1994	Switzerland	WJC	7	0	3	3	2
1995	Switzerland	WJC B	7	2	2	4	10
1997	Switzerland	WC B	7	0	0	0	0
2002	Switzerland	WC	6	0	1	1	2
2003	Switzerland	WC	7	1	1	2	4
2004	Switzerland	WC	7	0	0	0	4
2005	Switzerland	WC	7	0	0	0	8
2006	Switzerland	OG	6	1	0	1	6
2006	Switzerland	WC	6	1	0	1	6
2007	Switzerland	WC	4	0	0	0	0
2008	Switzerland	WC	7	2	1	3	4
2009	Switzerland	WC	6	0	1	1	6
2010	Switzerland	OG	5	0	1	1	6
Junior totals			20	5	9	14	26
Senior totals			68	5	5	10	46
