= Antti Pihlström =

Finnish ice hockey player

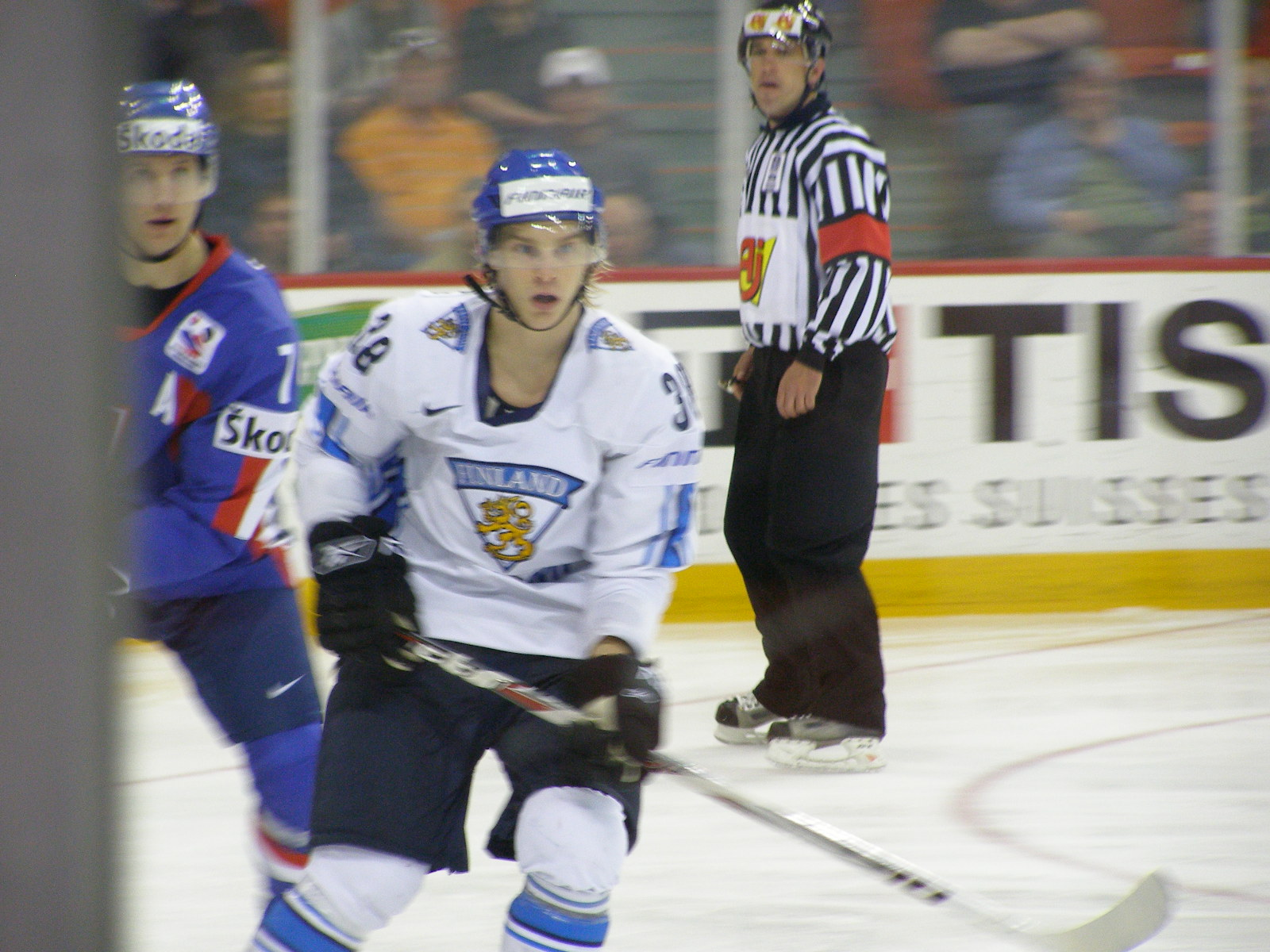
- Born: 22 October 1984 (age 41) Vantaa, Finland
- Height: 5 ft 11 in (180 cm)
- Weight: 181 lb (82 kg; 12 st 13 lb)
- Position: Left wing
- Shoots: Left
- Liiga team Former teams: HPK; Espoo Blues; SaiPa; Nashville Predators; Färjestads BK; JYP Jyväskylä; Salavat Yulaev Ufa; HC CSKA Moscow; Fribourg-Gotteron; Jokerit
- National team: Finland
- NHL draft: Undrafted
- Playing career: 2003–present

Antti Sakari Pihlström (born 22 October 1984) is a Finnish professional ice hockey left winger who is currently playing with HPK of the Finnish Liiga.

== Playing career ==
Pihlström played in Finland's SM-liiga for the Espoo Blues, HPK, and SaiPa. On 1 June 2007, Pihlström was signed by the Nashville Predators to a two-year contract.

In the 2007–08 season, his first in North America, Pihlström played primarily for the Predators affiliate the Milwaukee Admirals of the American Hockey League (AHL). He also made his NHL debut playing in one game for the Predators.

He then played at Färjestads BK of the Swedish Hockey League and at JYP in his native Finland, before heading to Russia. After four seasons with Salavat Yulaev Ufa of the Kontinental Hockey League (KHL), Pihlström made a return to North America as free agent in agreeing to attend the Columbus Blue Jackets training camp for the 2015–16 season on a professional try-out contract on 6 September 2015. After being waived, the spent the 2015–16 season with KHL side CSKA Moscow.

On 5 September 2016, he signed a one-month contract with Fribourg-Gotteron of the National League A (NLA), before moving on to Jokerit Helsinki of the Kontinental Hockey League the following month.

== International play ==
Medal record

Representing Finland

Ice hockey

Olympic Games
Bronze medal – third place	2014 Sochi	

World Championships
Gold medal – first place	2011 Slovakia	
Silver medal – second place	2007 Russia	
Silver medal – second place	2016 Russia	
Bronze medal – third place	2008 Canada	

Pihlström debuted for Finland national team in the 2008 World Championships with five goals, which lead the Finnish team.

== Career statistics ==
=== Regular season and playoffs ===
			Regular season					Playoffs
Season	Team	League	GP	G	A	Pts	PIM	GP	G	A	Pts	PIM
1999–2000	Kiekko–Vantaa	FIN U16	14	6	2	8	12	3	0	1	1	0
2000–01	Jokerit	FIN U16	12	9	11	20	14	2	2	0	2	4
2001–02	Jokerit	FIN U18	26	15	14	29	41	8	0	5	5	18
2001–02	Jokerit	Jr. A	1	0	0	0	0	—	—	—	—	—
2002–03	Blues	Jr. A	36	10	16	26	38	10	1	1	2	8
2003–04	Blues	Jr. A	23	9	19	28	42	1	0	2	2	0
2003–04	Blues	SM-l	49	1	3	4	18	9	0	0	0	0
2004–05	Blues	Jr. A	11	7	3	10	36	7	0	2	2	26
2004–05	Blues	SM-l	53	4	3	7	30	7	0	2	2	26
2005–06	SaiPa	SM-l	54	10	11	21	60	8	1	0	1	2
2006–07	HPK	SM-l	56	16	23	39	63	9	3	5	8	4
2007–08	Milwaukee Admirals	AHL	78	27	18	45	62	6	1	0	1	8
2007–08	Nashville Predators	NHL	1	0	0	0	0	—	—	—	—	—
2008–09	Milwaukee Admirals	AHL	15	8	4	12	10	—	—	—	—	—
2008–09	Nashville Predators	NHL	53	2	5	7	7	—	—	—	—	—
2009–10	Färjestads BK	SEL	43	4	6	10	44	—	—	—	—	—
2009–10	JYP	SM-l	19	7	14	21	14	14	4	4	8	18
2010–11	JYP	SM-l	59	30	23	53	51	10	1	3	4	26
2011–12	Salavat Yulaev Ufa	KHL	31	8	7	15	16	6	1	0	1	4
2012–13	Salavat Yulaev Ufa	KHL	47	14	8	22	14	14	5	1	6	10
2013–14	Salavat Yulaev Ufa	KHL	52	14	11	25	34	18	5	2	7	4
2014–15	Salavat Yulaev Ufa	KHL	60	16	12	28	22	5	2	0	2	0
2015–16	CSKA Moscow	KHL	29	1	1	2	8	20	2	2	4	8
2016–17	HC Fribourg–Gottéron	NLA	10	3	1	4	2	—	—	—	—	—
2016–17	Jokerit	KHL	27	3	5	8	10	4	1	0	1	14
2017–18	Jokerit	KHL	37	7	5	12	20	2	0	0	0	0
2018–19	Jokerit	KHL	41	1	3	4	10	6	0	0	0	2
2019–20	Jokerit	KHL	46	3	8	11	16	6	3	2	5	0
2020–21	Jokerit	KHL	45	5	2	7	8	4	0	0	0	2
Liiga totals			310	71	84	155	242	50	9	12	21	50
NHL totals			54	2	5	7	7	—	—	—	—	—
KHL totals			415	72	62	134	158	85	19	7	26	44

=== International ===
Year	Team	Event	Result	GP	G	A	Pts	PIM
2008	Finland	WC	3rd place, bronze medalist(s)	9	5	2	7	0
2010	Finland	WC	6th	7	0	1	1	4
2011	Finland	WC	1st place, gold medalist(s)	9	2	1	3	0
2012	Finland	WC	4th	9	1	1	2	0
2013	Finland	WC	4th	10	2	1	3	4
2014	Finland	OG	3rd place, bronze medalist(s)	5	0	0	0	0
2015	Finland	WC	6th	7	0	0	0	2
2016	Finland	WC	2nd place, silver medalist(s)	10	3	0	3	12
2017	Finland	WC	4th	10	0	2	2	6
Senior totals				76	13	8	21	28
