= Chris Schmidt (ice hockey) =

Canadian ice hockey player

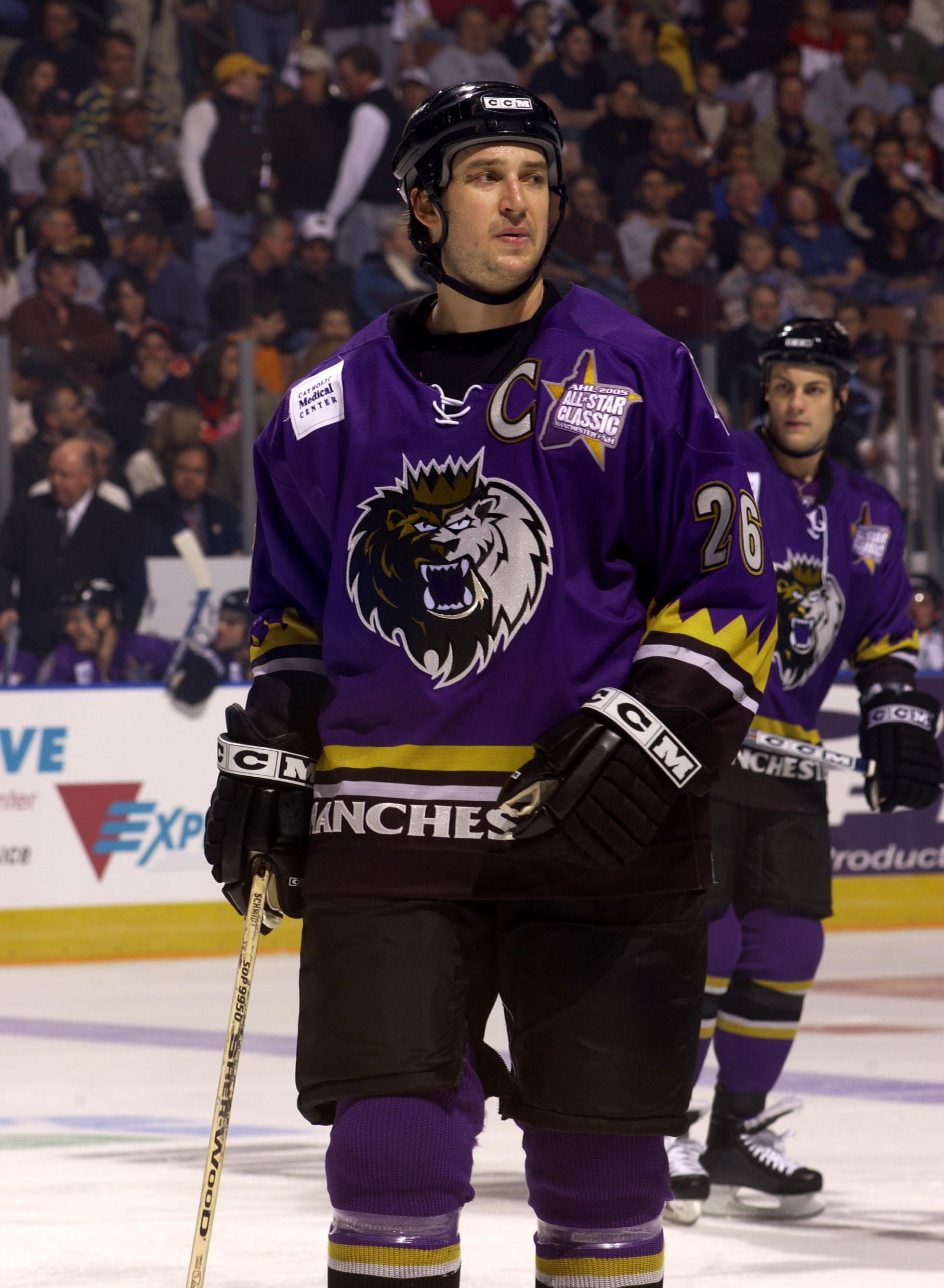
- Schmidt with the Manchester Monarchs during the 2004-05 season
- Born: March 1, 1976 (age 49); Beaverlodge, Alberta, Canada
- Height: 6 ft 3 in (191 cm)
- Weight: 212 lb (96 kg; 15 st 2 lb)
- Position: Centre/Defence
- Shot: Left
- Played for: Los Angeles Kings
- National team: Germany
- NHL draft: 111th overall, 1994; Los Angeles Kings
- Playing career: 1996–2013

Christopher Schmidt (born March 1, 1976) is a German-Canadian former professional ice hockey player who last played for the SERC Wild Wings of the DEL2. He also played on the German national team during the 2010 Winter Olympics in Vancouver, British Columbia, Canada.

== Career ==
Born in Beaverlodge, Alberta, Schmidt played for DEL club DEG Metro Stars during the 2005–06 season before joining fellow DEL team ERC Ingolstadt during the 2006 offseason. After one year in Bavaria he signed with his third DEL club, the Iserlohn Roosters, where he played for two seasons before joining Mannheim in 2009.

== Career statistics ==
=== Regular season and playoffs ===
| | | | Regular season | | | | | Playoffs |
| Season | Team | League | GP | G | A | Pts | PIM | GP | G | A | Pts | PIM |
|---|---|---|---|---|---|---|---|---|---|---|---|---|
| 1992–93 | Seattle Thunderbirds | WHL | 61 | 6 | 7 | 13 | 17 | 5 | 0 | 1 | 1 | 0 |
| 1993–94 | Seattle Thunderbirds | WHL | 68 | 7 | 17 | 24 | 26 | 9 | 3 | 1 | 4 | 2 |
| 1994–95 | Seattle Thunderbirds | WHL | 61 | 21 | 11 | 32 | 31 | 3 | 0 | 0 | 0 | 0 |
| 1995–96 | Seattle Thunderbirds | WHL | 61 | 39 | 23 | 62 | 135 | 5 | 1 | 5 | 6 | 9 |
| 1996–97 | Mississippi Sea Wolves | ECHL | 18 | 7 | 7 | 14 | 35 | — | — | — | — | — |
| 1996–97 | Phoenix Roadrunners | IHL | 37 | 3 | 6 | 9 | 60 | — | — | — | — | — |
| 1997–98 | Fredericton Canadiens | AHL | 69 | 8 | 5 | 13 | 67 | 4 | 0 | 0 | 0 | 2 |
| 1998–99 | Springfield Falcons | AHL | 17 | 3 | 2 | 5 | 19 | 1 | 0 | 0 | 0 | 0 |
| 1998–99 | Mississippi Sea Wolves | ECHL | 6 | 1 | 0 | 1 | 2 | 18 | 6 | 8 | 14 | 10 |
| 1999–2000 | Canadian National Team | Intl | 33 | 1 | 9 | 10 | 28 | — | — | — | — | — |
| 1999–2000 | Lowell Lock Monsters | AHL | 38 | 8 | 10 | 18 | 38 | 7 | 2 | 1 | 3 | 8 |
| 2000–01 | Lowell Lock Monsters | AHL | 79 | 21 | 32 | 53 | 84 | 4 | 2 | 2 | 4 | 2 |
| 2001–02 | Manchester Monarchs | AHL | 62 | 9 | 12 | 21 | 43 | 5 | 0 | 2 | 2 | 0 |
| 2002–03 | Los Angeles Kings | NHL | 10 | 0 | 2 | 2 | 5 | — | — | — | — | — |
| 2002–03 | Manchester Monarchs | AHL | 53 | 12 | 13 | 25 | 58 | 2 | 0 | 1 | 1 | 4 |
| 2003–04 | Manchester Monarchs | AHL | 54 | 6 | 13 | 19 | 39 | 6 | 0 | 1 | 1 | 4 |
| 2004–05 | Manchester Monarchs | AHL | 80 | 5 | 14 | 19 | 107 | 6 | 1 | 0 | 1 | 4 |
| 2005–06 | DEG Metro Stars | DEL | 51 | 5 | 7 | 12 | 73 | 14 | 1 | 0 | 1 | 12 |
| 2006–07 | ERC Ingolstadt | DEL | 52 | 5 | 13 | 18 | 52 | 6 | 1 | 5 | 6 | 4 |
| 2007–08 | Iserlohn Roosters | DEL | 49 | 3 | 15 | 18 | 44 | 7 | 1 | 0 | 1 | 12 |
| 2008–09 | Iserlohn Roosters | DEL | 51 | 3 | 14 | 17 | 77 | — | — | — | — | — |
| 2009–10 | Adler Mannheim | DEL | 51 | 1 | 5 | 6 | 82 | 2 | 0 | 0 | 0 | 0 |
| 2010–11 | Grizzly Adams Wolfsburg | DEL | 33 | 1 | 1 | 2 | 47 | 9 | 1 | 1 | 2 | 4 |
| 2011–12 | SERC Wild Wings | Germany2 | 46 | 2 | 17 | 19 | 56 | 11 | 0 | 5 | 5 | 8 |
| 2012–13 | SERC Wild Wings | Germany2 | 45 | 3 | 12 | 15 | 20 | 16 | 1 | 4 | 5 | 18 |
| AHL totals | | | 452 | 72 | 101 | 173 | 455 | 35 | 5 | 7 | 12 | 24 |
| NHL totals | | | 10 | 0 | 2 | 2 | 5 | — | — | — | — | — |
| DEL totals | | | 287 | 18 | 55 | 73 | 375 | 38 | 4 | 6 | 10 | 32 |

=== International ===
| Year | Team | Event | GP | G | A | Pts | PIM |
|---|---|---|---|---|---|---|---|
| 2008 | Germany | WC | 6 | 2 | 4 | 6 | 2 |
| 2009 | Germany | OGQ | 3 | 0 | 1 | 1 | 0 |
| 2009 | Germany | WC | 6 | 0 | 0 | 0 | 4 |
| 2010 | Germany | OG | 4 | 0 | 1 | 1 | 2 |
| Senior totals | | | 19 | 2 | 6 | 8 | 8 |
