= Jason Cirone =

Canadian-Italian ice hockey centre (1971–2024)

- Born: February 21, 1971 Toronto, Ontario, Canada
- Died: October 2, 2024 (aged 53)
- Height: 5 ft 11 in (180 cm)
- Weight: 209 lb (95 kg; 14 st 13 lb)
- Position: Centre
- Shot: Left
- Played for: HC Asiago; Frankfurt Lions; Winnipeg Jets
- National team: Italy
- NHL draft: 46th overall, 1989; Winnipeg Jets
- Playing career: 1991–2008

Jason Gerardo Cirone (February 21, 1971 – October 2, 2024) was a Canadian-Italian professional ice hockey centre. He played for the Winnipeg Jets of the National Hockey League and was the former head coach of the Metro Jets of the North American 3 Hockey League. He was head coach of the Midland University Men's hockey team in Fremont, Nebraska. Internationally, Cirone represented Italy at several World Championships and at the 2006 Winter Olympics.

== Playing career ==
As a youth, Cirone played in the 1984 Quebec International Pee-Wee Hockey Tournament with a minor ice hockey team from Don Mills.

Cirone was drafted by the Winnipeg Jets in the third round (46th overall) in the 1989 NHL entry draft. He played junior hockey for the Cornwall Royals and Windsor Spitfires of the Ontario Hockey League. Cirone appeared in three games with the Jets during the 1991–92 season.

In August 1993, the Jets traded Cirone to the Florida Panthers in exchange for forward Dave Tomlinson.

Cirone had a successful career in minor-league hockey. He played for the Moncton Hawks and Rochester Americans of the American Hockey League; and the Cincinnati Cyclones, Los Angeles Ice Dogs, Kansas City Blades, and Flint Generals of the International Hockey League. In 2006–07 he was a player-assistant coach with the Rio Grande Valley Killer Bees of the Central Hockey League. Cirone had two stints overseas for Asiago HC on the Italian Ice Hockey League in 1992–93 and then again from 2001 to 2006, and the Frankfurt Lions of the German Ice Hockey League in 2000–01. Cirone also spent two seasons playing roller hockey for the Buffalo Stampede in 1994 and 1995.

Cirone held an Italian passport, and played in the 2006 Winter Olympics in Turin, Italy as a member of the Italian team.

== Coaching career ==
Cirone was the Midland University Men's Hockey team's head coach in Fremont, Nebraska from 2013 to 2021. Cirone was previously the head coach of the Metro Jets of the North American 3 Hockey League located in Waterford, Michigan. He also had previously served as an assistant coach for the Jets.

== Death ==
Cirone died from cancer on October 2, 2024, at the age of 53.

== Career statistics ==
=== Regular season and playoffs ===
			Regular season					Playoffs
Season	Team	League	GP	G	A	Pts	PIM	GP	G	A	Pts	PIM
1986–87	Toronto Red Wings U18 AAA	GTHL	36	53	64	117	125	—	—	—	—	—
1987–88	Cornwall Royals	OHL	53	12	11	23	41	11	1	2	3	4
1988–89	Cornwall Royals	OHL	64	39	44	83	67	17	19	8	27	14
1989–90	Cornwall Royals	OHL	32	21	43	64	56	6	4	6	10	14
1990–91	Cornwall Royals	OHL	40	31	29	60	66	—	—	—	—	—
1990–91	Windsor Spitfires	OHL	23	27	23	50	31	11	9	8	17	14
1991–92	Winnipeg Jets	NHL	3	0	0	0	2	—	—	—	—	—
1991–92	Moncton Hawks	AHL	64	32	27	59	124	10	1	1	2	8
1992–93	HC Asiago	ITA	16	6	5	11	18	—	—	—	—	—
1993–94	Cincinnati Cyclones	IHL	26	4	2	6	61	—	—	—	—	—
1993–94	Birmingham Bulls	ECHL	11	3	3	6	45	10	8	8	16	67
1994–95	Cincinnati Cyclones	IHL	74	22	15	37	170	9	1	1	2	14
1995–96	Rochester Americans	AHL	24	4	5	9	34	—	—	—	—	—
1995–96	San Diego Gulls	WCHL	3	2	1	3	20	—	—	—	—	—
1995–96	Los Angeles Ice Dogs	IHL	26	8	10	18	47	—	—	—	—	—
1996–97	Long Beach Ice Dogs	IHL	11	4	3	7	14	—	—	—	—	—
1996–97	Kansas City Blades	IHL	70	18	38	56	88	3	0	3	3	2
1997–98	Kansas City Blades	IHL	82	22	30	52	166	11	3	3	6	20
1998–99	Kansas City Blades	IHL	82	42	26	68	151	3	1	0	1	8
1999–2000	Kansas City Blades	IHL	71	19	24	43	133	—	—	—	—	—
2000–01	Frankfurt Lions	DEL	51	18	17	35	138	—	—	—	—	—
2001–02	HC Asiago	ITA	37	20	13	33	77	4	0	1	1	4
2002–03	HC Asiago	ITA	33	16	18	34	124	11	3	2	5	22
2003–04	HC Asiago	ITA	38	31	21	52	79	12	6	5	11	16
2004–05	HC Asiago	ITA	18	1	13	14	34	3	0	1	1	2
2005–06	HC Asiago	ITA	46	18	31	49	78	—	—	—	—	—
2006–07	Rio Grande Valley Killer Bees	CHL	59	28	35	63	84	5	0	1	1	4
2007–08	Flint Generals	IHL	63	21	41	62	64	5	0	1	1	2
IHL totals			505	160	189	349	894	31	5	8	13	46
NHL totals			3	0	0	0	2	—	—	—	—	—
ITA totals			188	92	101	193	410	30	9	9	18	44

=== International ===
Year	Team	Event	GP	G	A	Pts	PIM
2004	Italy	WC D1	5	2	1	3	10
2006	Italy	OG	5	1	1	2	6
2006	Italy	WC	6	0	2	2	18
2007	Italy	WC	6	2	2	4	4
2008	Italy	WC	5	3	1	4	0
Senior totals			27	8	7	15	38
