= Jonathan Pittis =

Canadian-born Italian ice hockey player

- Born: January 25, 1982 (age 43) Calgary, Alberta, Canada
- Position: Forward
- National team: Italy
- Playing career: 2004–2013

Jonathan Pittis is a Canadian-born Italian professional ice hockey player who participated at the 2010 IIHF World Championship as a member of the Italian National men's ice hockey team.
