= Alexei Ugarov =

Belarusian ice hockey player

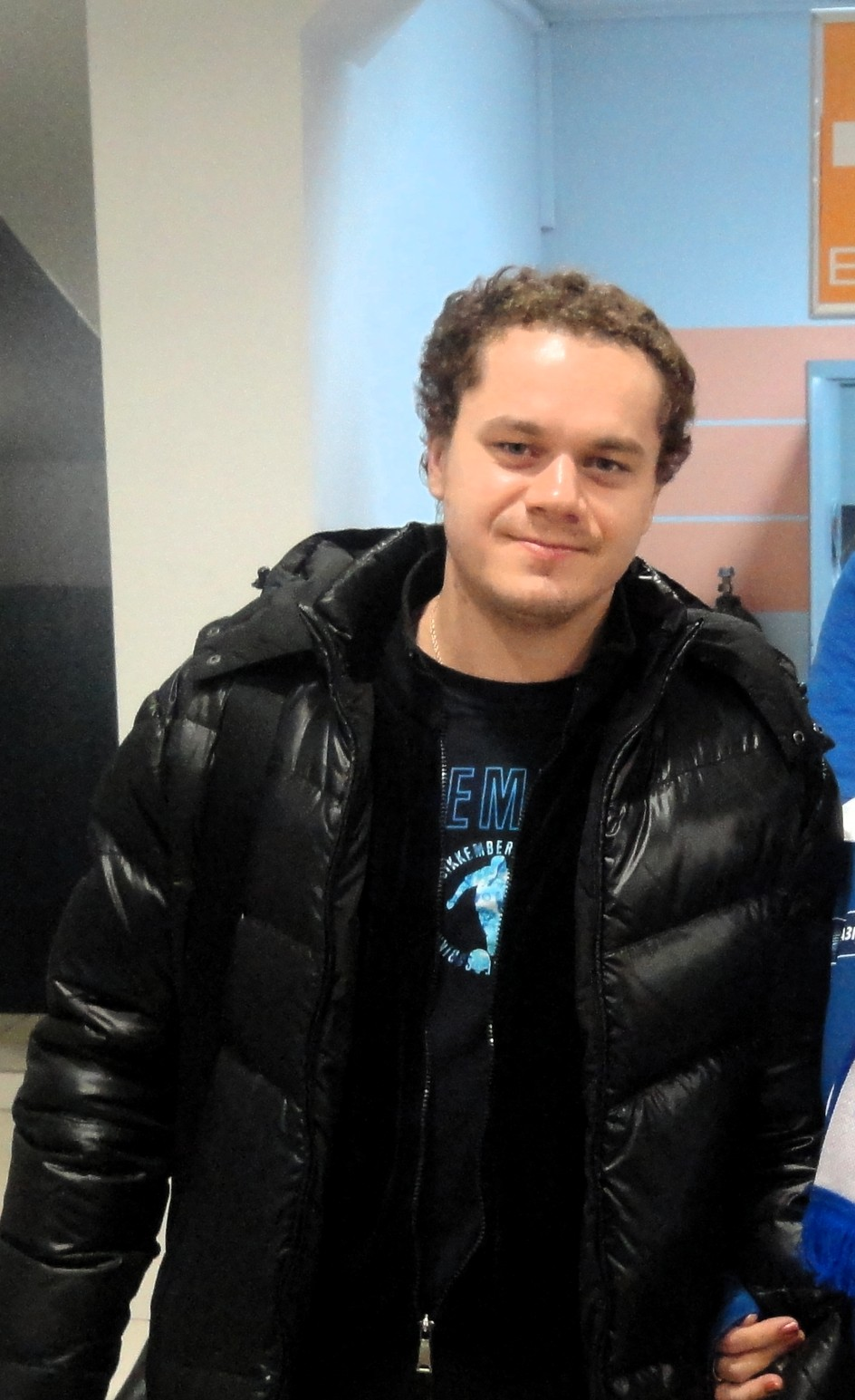
- Born: November 2, 1985 (age 39); Minsk, Byelorussian SSR, URS
- Height: 5 ft 9 in (175 cm)
- Weight: 176 lb (80 kg; 12 st 8 lb)
- Position: Left wing
- Caught: Left
- KHL team Former teams: Free Agent; Yunost Minsk; HC Neftekhimik Nizhnekamsk; HC MVD; HC Dynamo Moscow; Torpedo Nizhny Novgorod; Admiral Vladivostok; Amur Khabarovsk; Severstal Cherepovets
- National team: Belarus
- Playing career: 2003–2018

Alexei Mikhailovich Ugarov (Russian: Алексей Михайлович Угаров; born November 2, 1985) is a Belarusian professional ice hockey forward. He is currently an unrestricted free agent who most recently played for Severstal Cherepovets of the Kontinental Hockey League (KHL). He previously played three seasons for HC Nizhnekamsk Neftekhimik in the Russian Super League.

Ugarov was selected for the Belarus national men's ice hockey team in the 2010 Winter Olympics. He also participated at the 2010 IIHF World Championship as a member of the Belarus National men's ice hockey team.

== Career statistics ==
=== Regular season and playoffs ===
			Regular season					Playoffs
Season	Team	League	GP	G	A	Pts	PIM	GP	G	A	Pts	PIM
2001–02	Neftekhimik–2 Nizhnekamsk	RUS.3	39	6	2	8	46	—	—	—	—	—
2002–03	Neftekhimik–2 Nizhnekamsk	RUS.3	51	18	4	22	66	—	—	—	—	—
2003–04	Yunior Minsk	BLR	22	8	8	16	38	—	—	—	—	—
2003–04	Yunior Minsk	EEHL B	11	11	8	19	16	—	—	—	—	—
2003–04	Yunost Minsk	BLR	33	9	10	19	22	10	0	0	0	8
2003–04	Yunost–2 Minsk	BLR.2	2	1	0	1	2	—	—	—	—	—
2004–05	Yunost Minsk	BLR	31	3	11	14	36	6	1	1	2	6
2004–05	Yunior Minsk	BLR.2	10	5	11	16	4	—	—	—	—	—
2005–06	Neftekhimik Nizhnekamsk	RSL	45	9	9	18	40	5	0	1	1	6
2005–06	Yunost Minsk	BLR	—	—	—	—	—	8	5	3	8	8
2006–07	Neftekhimik Nizhnekamsk	RSL	45	9	11	20	32	4	0	0	0	2
2007–08	Neftekhimik Nizhnekamsk	RSL	31	1	1	2	10	4	2	0	2	2
2007–08	Neftekhimik–2 Nizhnekamsk	RUS.3	13	9	4	13	28	—	—	—	—	—
2007–08	Yunost Minsk	BLR	—	—	—	—	—	9	4	2	6	14
2008–09	HC MVD	KHL	51	14	9	23	30	—	—	—	—	—
2009–10	HC MVD	KHL	54	17	6	23	26	22	9	4	13	8
2010–11	Dynamo Moscow	KHL	51	13	9	22	28	6	0	1	1	2
2011–12	Torpedo Nizhny Novgorod	KHL	51	11	15	26	36	13	3	1	4	8
2012–13	Torpedo Nizhny Novgorod	KHL	31	2	5	7	26	—	—	—	—	—
2013–14	Admiral Vladivostok	KHL	42	10	5	15	16	5	2	0	2	4
2014–15	Admiral Vladivostok	KHL	46	8	5	13	49	—	—	—	—	—
2015–16	Admiral Vladivostok	KHL	27	5	7	12	12	3	0	0	0	25
2016–17	Amur Khabarovsk	KHL	4	0	0	0	4	—	—	—	—	—
2016–17	Severstal Cherepovets	KHL	22	1	4	5	12	—	—	—	—	—
2017–18	Severstal Cherepovets	KHL	32	2	4	6	12	4	1	0	1	2
BLR totals			86	20	29	49	96	33	10	6	16	36
RSL totals			121	19	21	40	82	13	2	1	3	10
KHL totals			411	83	69	152	251	53	15	6	21	49

=== International ===
Year	Team	Event	GP	G	A	Pts	PIM
2005	Belarus	WJC	6	3	0	3	6
2005	Belarus	WC	6	0	0	0	2
2006	Belarus	WC	7	0	2	2	4
2007	Belarus	WC	6	3	2	5	6
2008	Belarus	WC	6	4	1	5	0
2009	Belarus	WC	7	2	0	2	2
2010	Belarus	OG	4	1	1	2	4
2010	Belarus	WC	6	0	2	2	0
2011	Belarus	WC	6	0	1	1	2
2012	Belarus	WC	7	2	1	3	0
2013	Belarus	OGQ	3	0	3	3	2
2013	Belarus	WC	7	1	1	2	0
2014	Belarus	WC	8	1	0	1	0
Senior totals			73	14	14	28	22
