= Aleksandr Ugarov =

Russian footballer (born 1982)

Personal information
- Full name: Aleksandr Vladimirovich Ugarov
- Date of birth: 8 June 1982 (age 44)
- Place of birth: Kaluga, RSFSR, USSR
- Height: 1.78 m (5 ft 10 in)
- Position: Defender

Senior career*
Years	Team	Apps	(Gls)
2000	FC Dynamo-2 Moscow	19	(0)
2001–2002	FC Dynamo Moscow (reserves)		
2004	FC Zhetysu	3	(0)
2008–2009	FC MiK Kaluga (D4)		
2010	FC Kaluga	8	(0)
- * Club domestic league appearances and goals

Aleksandr Vladimirovich Ugarov (Russian: Александр Владимирович Угаров; born 8 June 1982) is a former Russian professional football player.
