= Barner =

Barner is a surname. Notable people with the surname include:

- A. J. Barner (born 2002), American football player
- Ann Barner (born 1950), English swimmer
- Joachim Hartvig Johan von Barner (1699–1768), Danish-German military officer
- Kenjon Barner (born 1989), American football player
- Kenneth Barner, American engineer
- Martin Barner (1921–2020), German mathematician
- Regitze Barner (1834–1911), Danish noblewoman

== See also ==
- Barner (noble family), Danish noble family
- Barner Stücker See, lake in Mecklenburg-Vorpommern, Germany
- Barnor, surname
- Mads Barner-Christensen (born 1965), a Danish author
- Uri Bar-Ner, a senior adviser to the President of the America-Israel Friendship League
