= 2008 IIHF World Championship rosters =

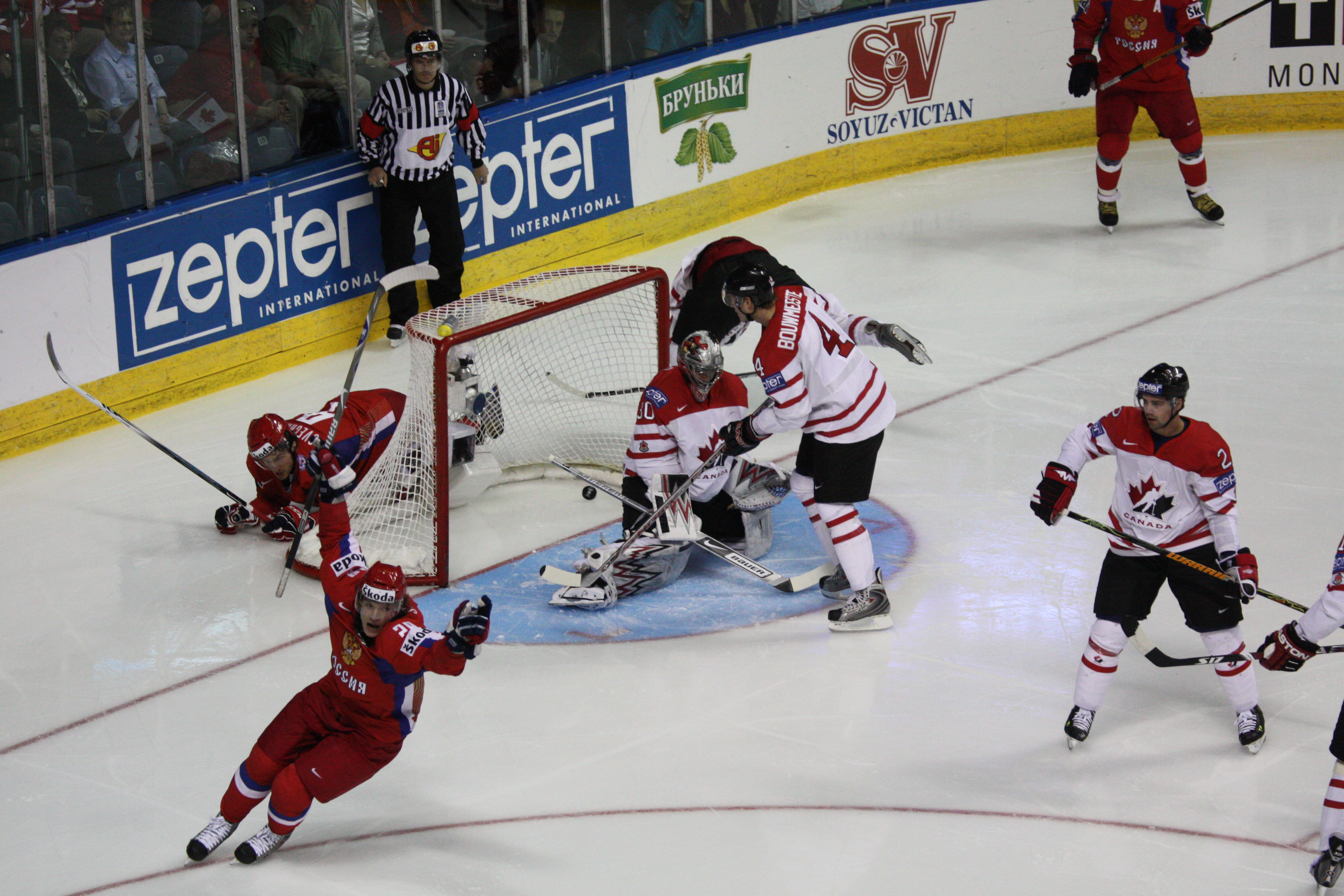
Alexander Semin of Russia after scoring the first goal of the gold medal game. Semin led Russia in scoring with six goals and thirteen points.

The 2008 IIHF World Championship rosters consisted of 399 players on 16 national ice hockey teams. In honour of the International Ice Hockey Federation's (IIHF) 100th anniversary, the World Championship was hosted in Canada for the first time. Held in Quebec City and Halifax, Canada, the 2008 IIHF World Championship was the 72nd edition of the tournament. Russia won the Championship, the second time they had done so and their 24th title if including those won by the Soviet Union. Dany Heatley of Canada led the tournament in scoring with 20 points, and was named the tournament's most valuable player and top forward. Canadian Brent Burns was named top defenceman, while Evgeni Nabokov of Russia was selected as top goaltender.

Before the start of the World Championship, each participating nation had to submit a list of players for its roster. A minimum of 15 skaters and two goaltenders, and a maximum of 20 skaters and three goaltenders had to be selected. If a country selected fewer than the maximum allowed, they had to choose the remaining players prior to the start of the tournament. After the start of the tournament, each team was allowed to select an additional two players, either skaters or goaltenders, to their roster, for a maximum roster of 25 players. Once a player was registered to the team, he could not be removed from the roster.

To qualify for a national team under IIHF rules, a player must follow several criteria. He must be a citizen of the nation, and be under the jurisdiction of that national ice hockey association. Players are allowed to switch which national team they play for, providing they fulfill the IIHF criteria. If participating for the first time in an IIHF event, the player would have had to play two consecutive years in the national competition of the new country, without playing in another nation. If the player has already played for a national team before, he may switch nationality if he is a citizen of the new country, and has played for four consecutive years in the national competition of the new country. This switch may only happen once in the player's life.

== Legend ==
General
Number	Uniform number
Club	Player's club before tournament. (from the official IIHF listing).

Positions
F	Forward
D	Defenceman
GK	Goaltender

Statistics
GP	Games played	W	Wins
G	Goals	L	Losses
A	Assists	Min	Minutes played
Pts	Points	GA	Goals against
PIM	Penalties in minutes	GAA	Goals against average
		SV%	Save percentage
		SO	Shutouts

== Belarus ==
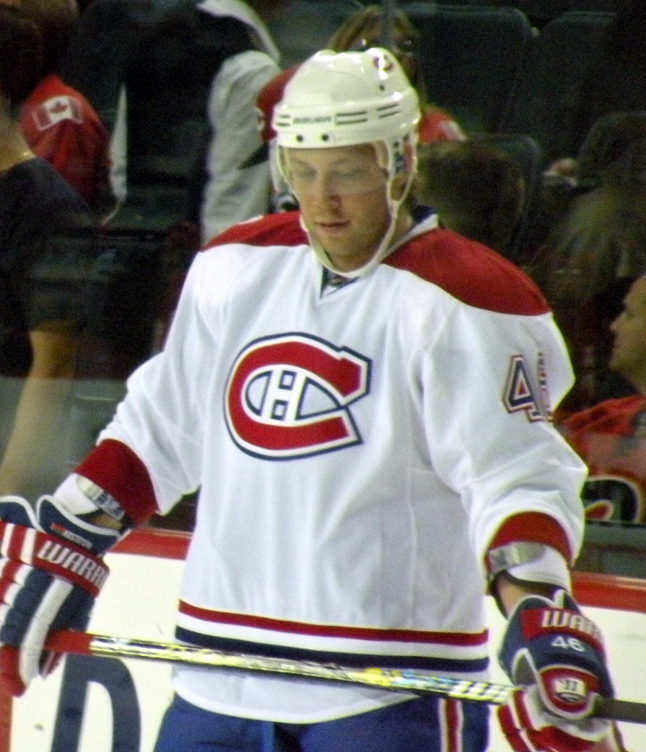
Andrei Kostitsyn had two goals and one assist for Belarus.

- Head coach: (United States) Curt Fraser

=== Skaters ===
Number	Position	Player	Club	GP	G	A	Pts	PIM
10	F	Oleg Antonenko	HK MVD Moscow Region	2	0	0	0	2
29	D	Andrei Bashko	Metallurg Zhlobin	3	0	0	0	0
68	F	Yaroslav Chupris	Keramin Minsk	6	1	1	2	2
7	D	Vladimir Denisov	Lake Erie Monsters	6	0	3	3	6
77	F	Dmitry Dudik	Dinamo Minsk	6	1	3	4	4
84	F	Mikhail Grabovski	Montreal Canadiens	5	0	3	3	0
71	F	Alexei Kalyuzhny	Avangard Omsk	6	1	3	4	4
25	D	Sergei Kolosov	Dinamo Minsk	6	0	0	0	2
28	F	Konstantin Koltsov	Salavat Yulaev Ufa	3	1	2	3	0
23	F	Andrei Kostitsyn	Montreal Canadiens	5	2	1	3	18
74	F	Sergei Kostitsyn	Montreal Canadiens	4	0	1	1	0
43	D	Viktor Kostyuchenok	Junost Minsk	6	1	2	3	10
11	F	Alexander Kulakov	Dinamo Minsk	5	0	1	1	0
93	F	Evegeni Kurilin	Dinamo Minsk	3	0	0	0	0
3	D	Oleg Leontiev	Junost Minsk	6	0	3	3	0
4	D	Aleksandr Makritsky	Keramin Minsk	1	0	0	0	0
19	F	Dmitry Meleshko	Spartak Moscow	6	2	1	3	4
8	F	Andrei Mikhalev	HK Keramin Minsk	6	1	1	2	6
24	D	Ruslan Salei	Colorado Avalanche	5	0	2	2	6
18	F	Alexei Ugarov	Neftekhimik Nizhnekamsk	6	4	1	5	0
22	F	Sergei Zadelenov	HK Gomel	6	1	2	3	6
27	D	Aleksandr Zhurik	Dinamo Minsk	6	1	0	1	2

=== Goaltenders ===
Number	Player	Club	GP	W	L	Min	GA	GAA	SV%	SO
33	Stepan Goryachevskikh	Junost Minsk	0	0	0	0	0	0	0	0
1	Vitali Koval	HK Neman Grodno	6	1	5	370	19	3.07	.912	0
20	Dmitry Milchakov	HK Vitebsk	0	0	0	0	0	0	0	0

== Canada ==
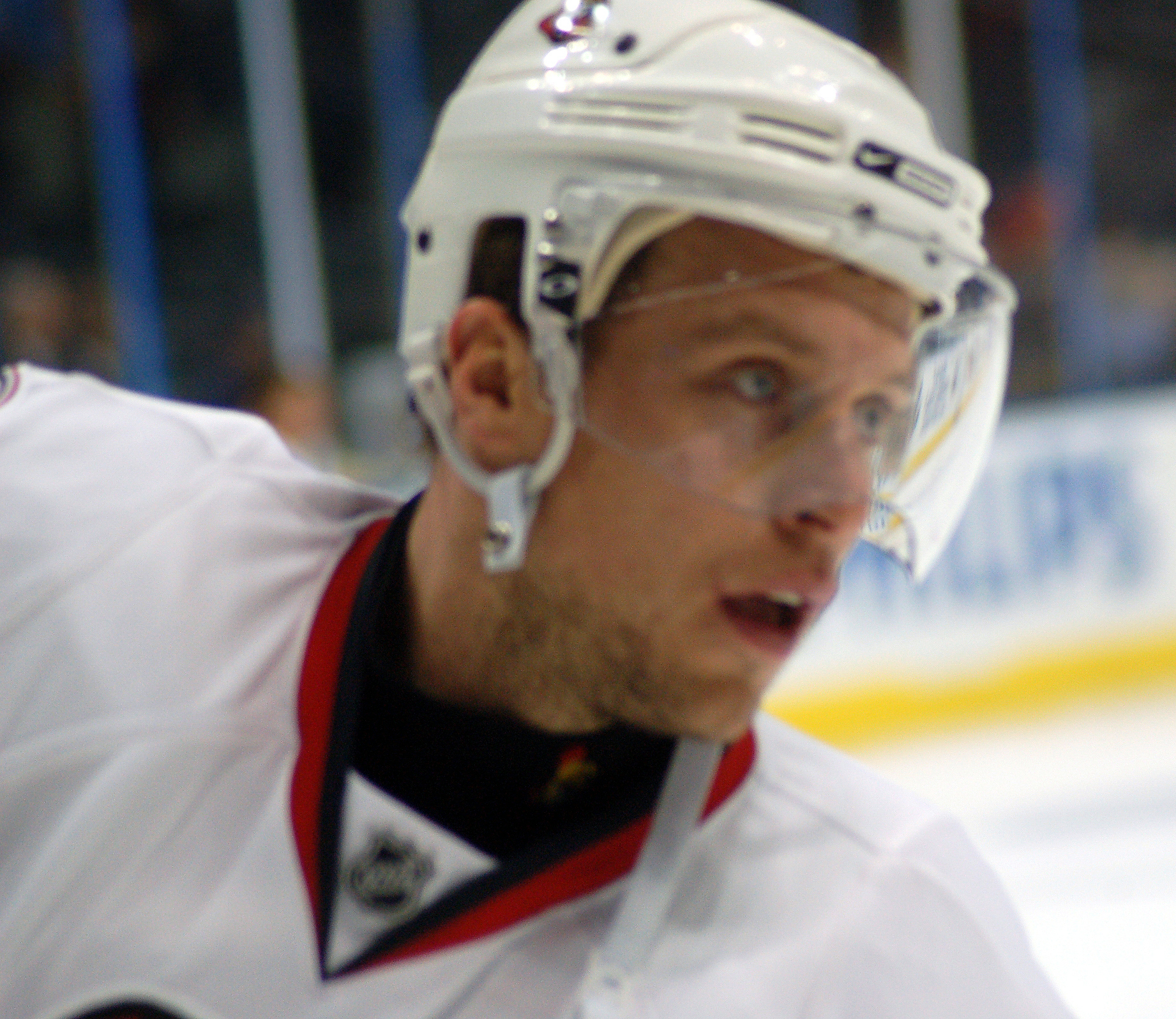
Dany Heatley led the tournament in scoring, being named most valuable player and best forward.

- Head coach: (Canada) Ken Hitchcock

=== Skaters ===
vlevo
Number	Position	Player	Club	GP	G	A	Pts	PIM
4	D	Jay Bouwmeester	Florida Panthers	9	0	0	0	4
8	D	Brent Burns	Minnesota Wild	9	3	6	9	16
25	F	Jason Chimera	Columbus Blue Jackets	9	0	2	2	6
19	F	Shane Doan	Phoenix Coyotes	9	2	4	6	6
89	F	Sam Gagner	Edmonton Oilers	1	0	0	0	0
51	F	Ryan Getzlaf	Anaheim Ducks	9	3	11	14	10
7	D	Mark Giordano	Dynamo Moscow	0	0	0	0	0
52	D	Mike Green	Washington Capitals	9	4	8	12	2
2	D	Dan Hamhuis	Nashville Predators	9	1	1	2	8
15	F	Dany Heatley	Ottawa Senators	9	12	8	20	4
55	D	Ed Jovanovski	Phoenix Coyotes	9	0	1	1	4
22	D	Duncan Keith	Chicago Blackhawks	9	0	2	2	6
14	F	Chris Kunitz	Anaheim Ducks	9	2	5	7	4
21	F	Jamal Mayers	St. Louis Blues	9	2	3	5	2
61	F	Rick Nash	Columbus Blue Jackets	9	6	7	13	6
9	F	Derek Roy	Buffalo Sabres	9	5	5	10	6
10	F	Patrick Sharp	Chicago Blackhawks	9	3	0	3	4
91	F	Jason Spezza	Ottawa Senators	9	1	2	3	0
26	F	Martin St. Louis	Tampa Bay Lightning	9	2	8	10	0
12	F	Eric Staal	Carolina Hurricanes	8	4	3	7	6
24	D	Steve Staios	Edmonton Oilers	9	0	0	0	4
16	F	Jonathan Toews	Chicago Blackhawks	9	2	3	5	8

=== Goaltenders ===
Number	Player	Club	GP	W	L	Min	GA	GAA	SV%	SO
32	Mathieu Garon	Edmonton Oilers	0	0	0	0	0	0	0	0
31	Pascal Leclaire	Columbus Blue Jackets	4	4	0	240	8	2.00	.925	1
30	Cam Ward	Carolina Hurricanes	5	4	1	302	13	2.58	.900	0

== Czech Republic ==
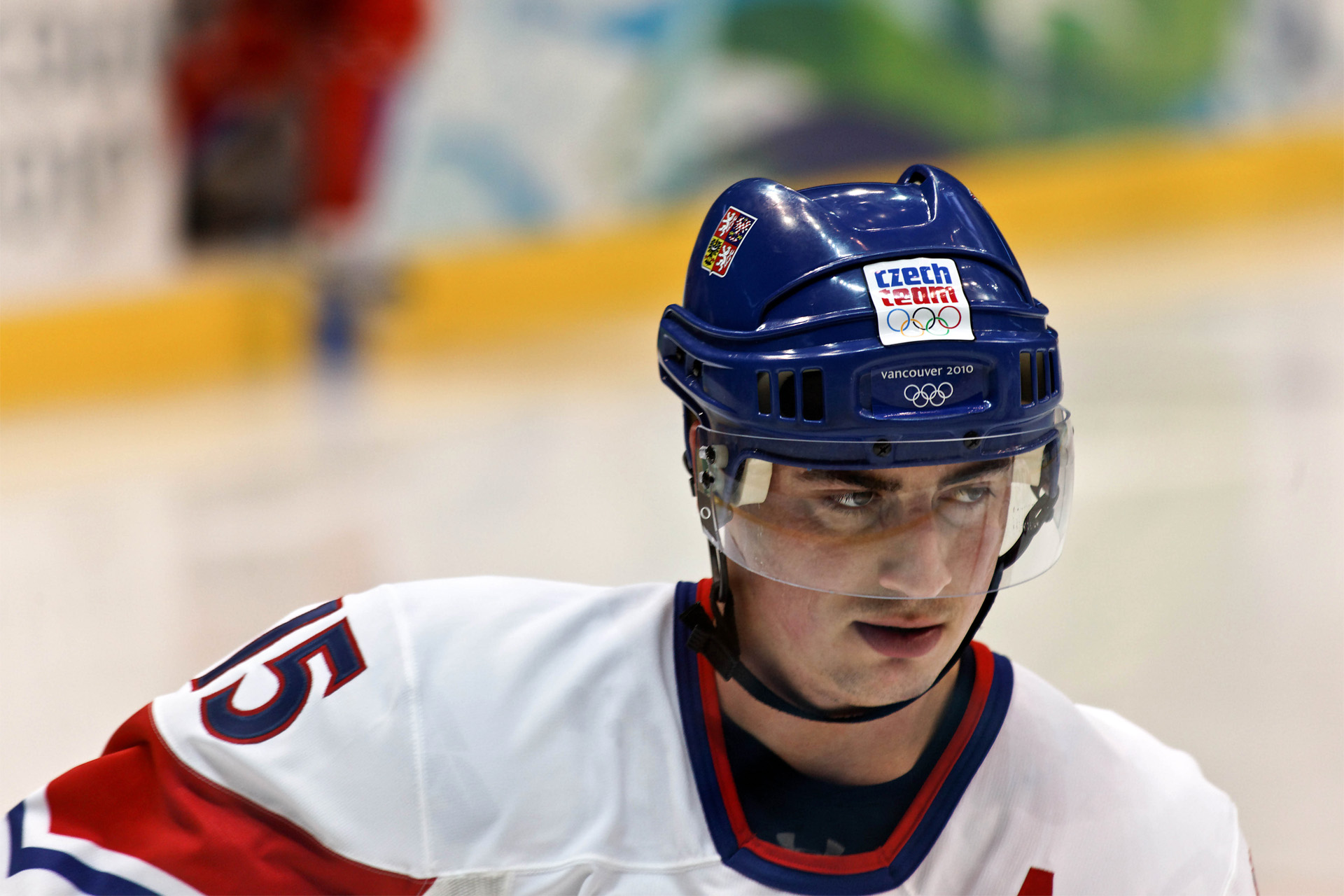
Tomáš Kaberle led the Czech Republic team in scoring with one goal and nine assists.

- Head coach: (Czech Republic) Alois Hadamczik

=== Skaters ===
Number	Position	Player	Club	GP	G	A	Pts	PIM
36	D	Petr Čáslava	Severstal Cherepovets	7	0	0	0	4
26	F	Patrik Eliáš	New Jersey Devils	7	6	3	9	6
10	F	Martin Erat	Nashville Predators	7	2	4	6	14
43	F	Tomáš Fleischmann	Washington Capitals	7	2	3	5	0
11	F	Martin Hanzal	Phoenix Coyotes	6	0	3	3	8
35	D	Jan Hejda	Columbus Blue Jackets	7	1	0	1	0
17	F	Jaroslav Hlinka	Colorado Avalanche	6	1	3	4	2
24	F	Zbyněk Irgl	Lokomotiv Yaroslavl	7	1	2	3	2
15	D	Tomáš Kaberle	Toronto Maple Leafs	7	1	9	10	0
20	F	Jakub Klepiš	Slavia Praha	4	0	1	1	0
18	F	Ladislav Kohn	CSKA Moscow	5	0	1	1	14
12	F	Aleš Kotalík	Buffalo Sabres	7	5	2	7	0
64	F	David Krejčí	Boston Bruins	5	0	0	0	2
71	D	Filip Kuba	Tampa Bay Lightning	7	1	2	3	4
4	D	Zbyněk Michálek	Phoenix Coyotes	7	0	0	0	6
13	F	Jiří Novotný	Columbus Blue Jackets	7	1	1	2	2
14	F	Tomáš Plekanec	Montreal Canadiens	4	0	3	3	2
60	F	Tomáš Rolinek	HC Pardubice	7	2	1	3	2
28	D	Michal Rozsíval	New York Rangers	4	0	0	0	0
34	F	Václav Skuhravý	HC Energie Karlovy Vary	2	0	0	0	0
19	F	Radim Vrbata	Phoenix Coyotes	7	5	2	7	4
3	D	Marek Židlický	Nashville Predators	7	1	4	5	6

=== Goaltenders ===
Number	Player	Club	GP	W	L	Min	GA	GAA	SV%	SO
33	Milan Hnilička	Salavat Yulaev Ufa	6	3	3	370	16	2.59	.878	1
97	Marek Pinc	Bílí Tygři Liberec	1	1	0	60	2	2.00	.857	0
31	Adam Svoboda	Slavia Praha	0	0	0	0	0	0	0	0

== Denmark ==
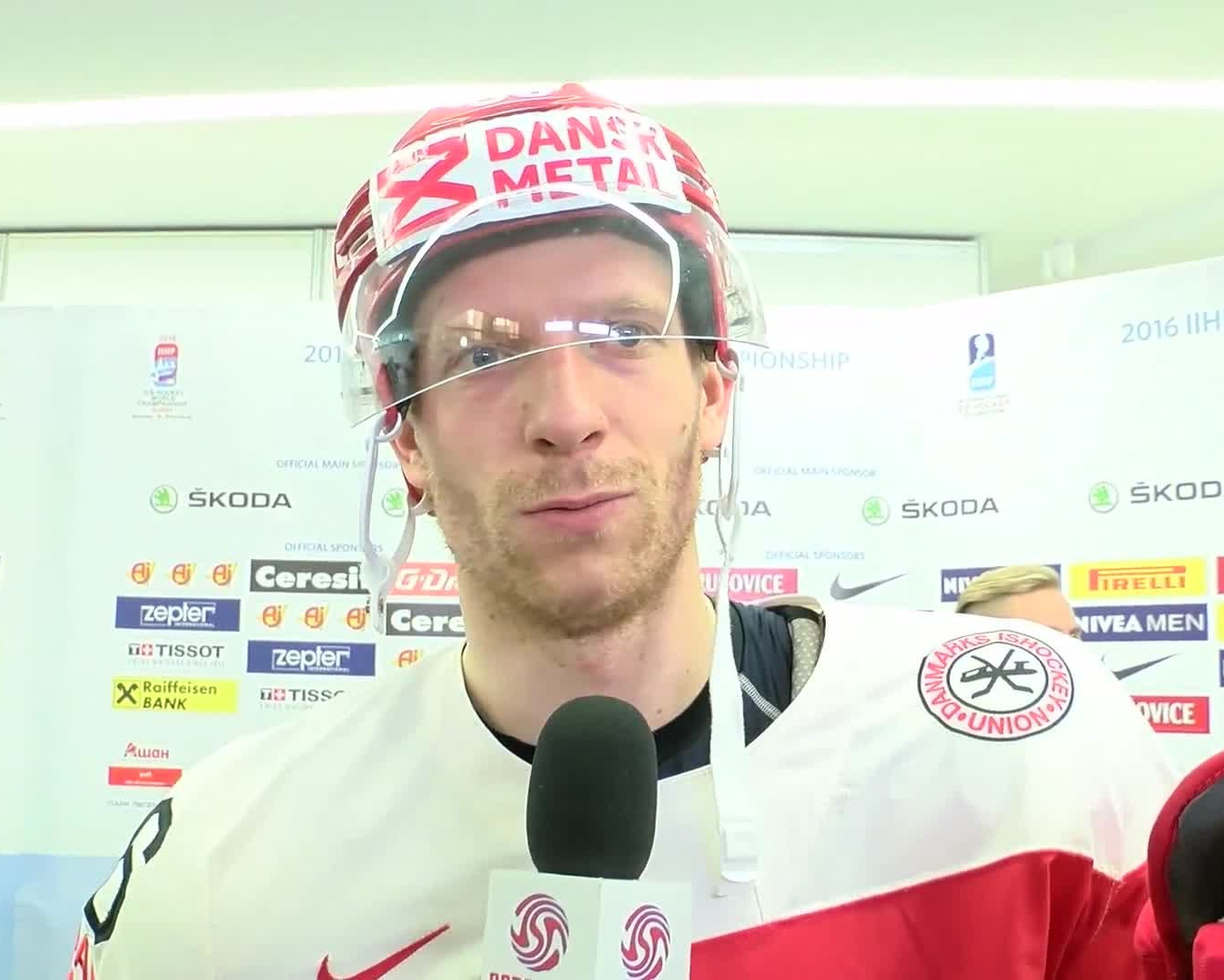
With four points in six games, Jannik Hansen finished third in scoring for Denmark.

- Head coach: (Canada) Mike Sirant

=== Skaters ===
Number	Position	Player	Club	GP	G	A	Pts	PIM
25	D	Andreas Andreasen	Esbjerg IK	6	0	1	1	0
4	D	Mads Bødker	Rögle BK Angelholm	6	0	0	0	0
18	F	Mads Christensen	Herning Blue Fox	4	0	0	0	0
14	D	Mads Christensen	Herning Blue Fox	5	0	0	0	0
26	D	Morten Dahlmann	Herlev Hornets	5	0	1	1	4
7	D	Jesper Damgaard	Rødovre Mighty Bulls	6	1	1	2	6
9	D	Kasper Degn	Nordsjælland Cobras	6	2	0	2	2
21	F	Thor Dresler	Odense Bulldogs	3	0	1	1	0
20	F	Lars Eller	Frölunda HC	6	0	2	2	0
13	F	Morten Green	Leksands IF	6	1	5	6	10
17	F	Jannik Hansen	Manitoba Moose	6	2	2	4	0
32	F	Nichlas Hardt	Tappara Tampere	6	0	0	0	2
16	F	Christoffer Kjærgaard	Herning Blue Fox	6	0	1	1	0
11	F	Kim Lykkeskov	SønderjyskE	6	0	0	0	4
6	D	Stefan Lassen	Herning Blue Fox	6	1	1	2	12
29	F	Morten Madsen	Houston Aeros	6	1	1	2	4
5	D	Daniel Nielsen	Leksands IF	6	1	2	3	4
10	F	Bo Nordby	Aalborg IK	6	0	0	0	6
24	D	Rasmus Olsen	Aalborg IK	3	0	0	0	0
93	F	Peter Regin	Timrå IK	6	2	1	3	4
2	F	Mads Schaarup	SønderjyskE Vojens	2	0	0	0	0
19	F	Kim Staal	Linköpings HC	6	4	2	6	2

=== Goaltenders ===
Number	Player	Club	GP	W	L	Min	GA	GAA	SV%	SO
30	Patrick Galbraith	SønderjyskE Vojens	4	1	3	197	14	4.25	.901	0
31	Peter Hirsch	Aalborg IK	3	1	2	164	14	5.12	.870	0
1	Simon Nielsen	Rødovre Mighty Bulls	0	0	0	0	0	0	0	0

== Finland ==
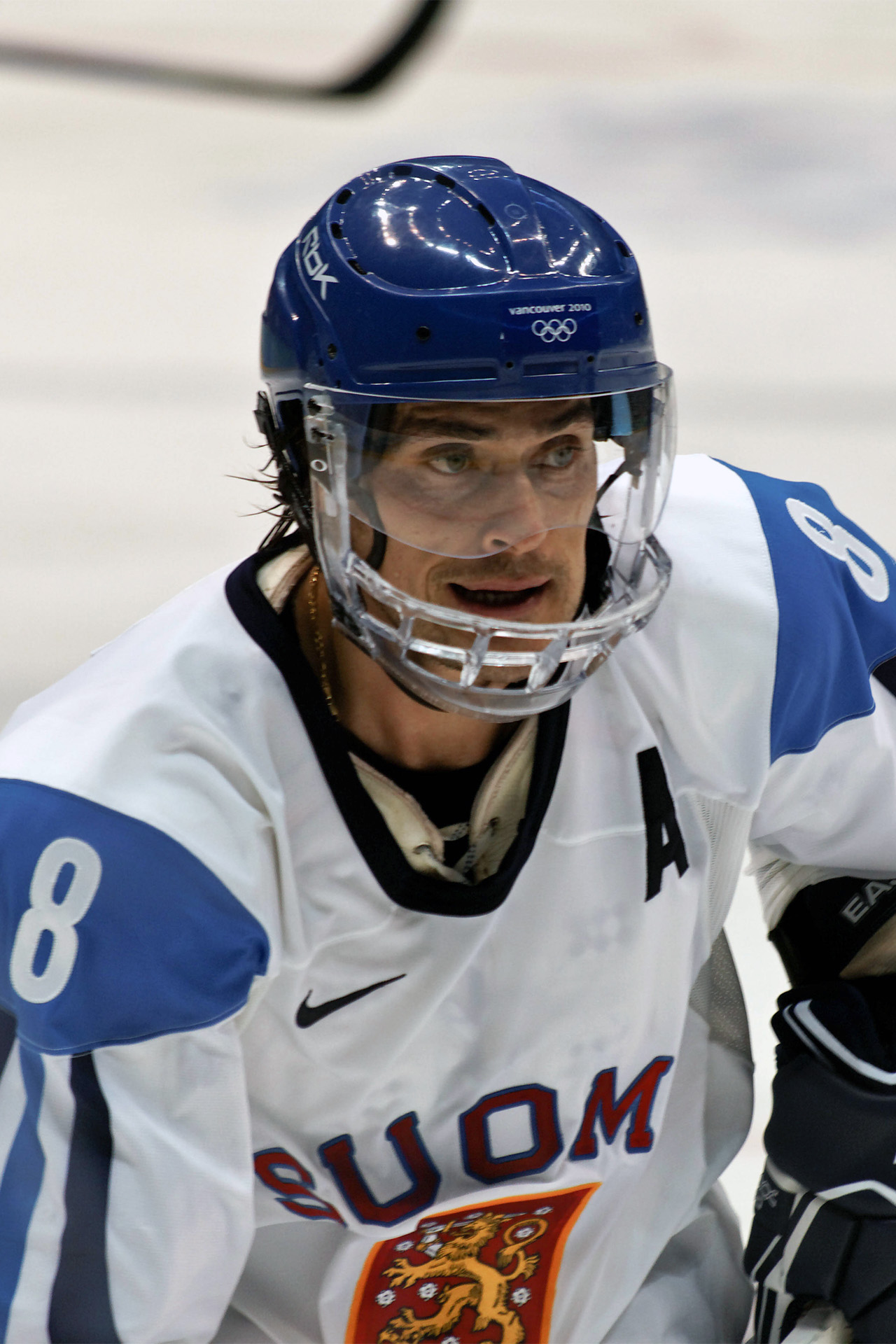
Teemu Selänne helped Finland win a bronze medal by scoring seven points.

- Head coach: (Canada) Doug Shedden

=== Skaters ===
vlevo
Number	Position	Player	Club	GP	G	A	Pts	PIM
20	F	Sean Bergenheim	New York Islanders	4	0	0	0	2
23	F	Riku Hahl	Timrå IK	9	0	0	0	0
18	F	Hannes Hyvönen	Kärpät	6	1	3	4	29
27	D	Mikko Jokela	Jokerit	9	0	0	0	6
36	F	Jussi Jokinen	Tampa Bay Lightning	9	1	3	4	4
12	F	Olli Jokinen	Florida Panthers	8	1	4	5	29
39	F	Niko Kapanen	Phoenix Coyotes	9	2	5	7	0
4	D	Ville Koistinen	Nashville Predators	9	1	1	2	4
9	F	Mikko Koivu	Minnesota Wild	9	4	5	9	6
11	F	Saku Koivu	Montreal Canadiens	6	0	3	3	4
40	D	Sami Lepistö	Hershey Bears	7	1	1	2	10
19	D	Mikko Luoma	HV71	8	0	0	0	6
7	D	Antti-Jussi Niemi	Frölunda HC	9	0	1	1	28
21	D	Janne Niskala	Milwaukee Admirals	9	2	2	4	2
16	F	Ville Peltonen	Florida Panthers	9	1	3	4	4
38	F	Antti Pihlström	Milwaukee Admirals	9	5	2	7	0
10	F	Esa Pirnes	Färjestad BK	4	0	0	0	0
37	D	Mika Pyörälä	Timrå IK	9	0	0	0	0
15	F	Tuomo Ruutu	Carolina Hurricanes	9	4	2	6	8
33	D	Anssi Salmela	Tappara	8	0	0	0	37
8	F	Teemu Selänne	Anaheim Ducks	9	3	4	7	12
6	D	Ossi Väänänen	Djurgårdens IF	9	0	1	1	8

=== Goaltenders ===
Number	Player	Club	GP	W	L	Min	GA	GAA	SV%	SO
32	Niklas Bäckström	Minnesota Wild	8	6	2	483	17	2.11	.922	1
31	Karri Rämö	Tampa Bay Lightning	0	0	0	0	0	0	0	0
35	Petri Vehanen	Lukko	1	1	0	62	2	1.95	.895	0

== France ==
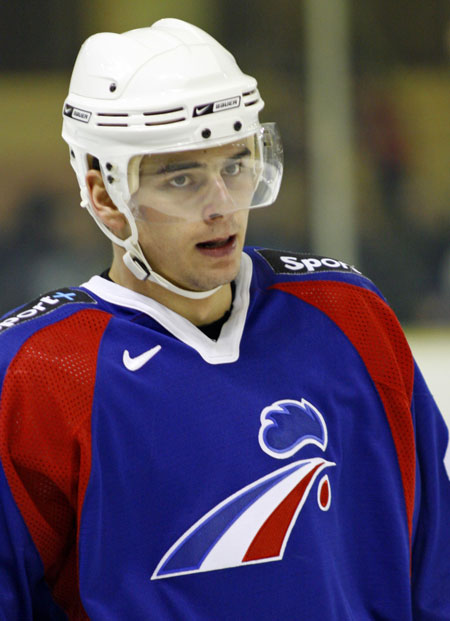
Sacha Treille had one assist as France stayed in the top division of ice hockey.

- Head coach: (France) Dave Henderson

=== Skaters ===
Number	Position	Player	Club	GP	G	A	Pts	PIM
27	D	Baptiste Amar	Grenoble Brûleurs de Loups	5	2	3	5	6
3	D	Vincent Bachet	Gothiques d'Amiens	5	0	1	1	6
41	F	Pierre-Édouard Bellemare	Leksands IF	5	0	0	0	18
74	D	Nicolas Besch	Sport Vaasa	5	0	0	0	6
55	D	Jean-François Bonnard	Grenoble Brûleurs de Loups	5	0	0	0	0
71	F	Sébastien Bordeleau	SC Bern	5	2	4	6	6
19	F	Olivier Coqueux	Esbjerg IK	5	1	0	1	4
24	F	Julien Desrosiers	Dragons de Rouen	5	2	3	5	6
28	F	Laurent Gras	Gothiques d'Amiens	5	0	0	0	4
84	F	Kévin Hecquefeuille	Grenoble Brûleurs de Loups	5	0	0	0	4
72	D	Simon Lacroix	Ducs d'Angers	5	0	1	1	2
26	F	Anthoine Lussier	HC La Chaux-de-Fonds	5	0	0	0	4
10	F	Laurent Meunier	Genève-Servette HC	3	0	0	0	0
29	D	Mathieu Mille	HC Morzine-Avoriaz	2	0	0	0	0
16	D	Benoit Quessandier	Dragons de Rouen	5	0	0	0	0
20	F	Damien Raux	Briançon Alpes Provence HC	2	0	0	0	0
11	F	François Rozenthal	HC Morzine-Avoriaz	5	0	1	1	2
18	F	Luc Tardif	HC Morzine-Avoriaz	5	0	0	0	4
87	D	Teddy Trabichet	Grenoble Brûleurs de Loups	2	0	0	0	2
77	F	Sacha Treille	Grenoble Brûleurs de Loups	5	0	1	1	4
7	F	Yorick Treille	ERC Ingolstadt	5	3	1	4	12
13	F	Jonathan Zwikel	HC Morzine-Avoriaz	5	1	1	2	2

=== Goaltenders ===
Number	Player	Club	GP	W	L	Min	GA	GAA	SV%	SO
1	Eddy Ferhi	Grenoble Brûleurs de Loups	0	0	0	0	0	0	0	0
39	Cristobal Huet	Washington Capitals	5	2	3	250	15	3.60	.911	0
42	Fabrice Lhenry	Esbjerg IK	1	0	1	50	7	8.51	.848	0

== Germany ==
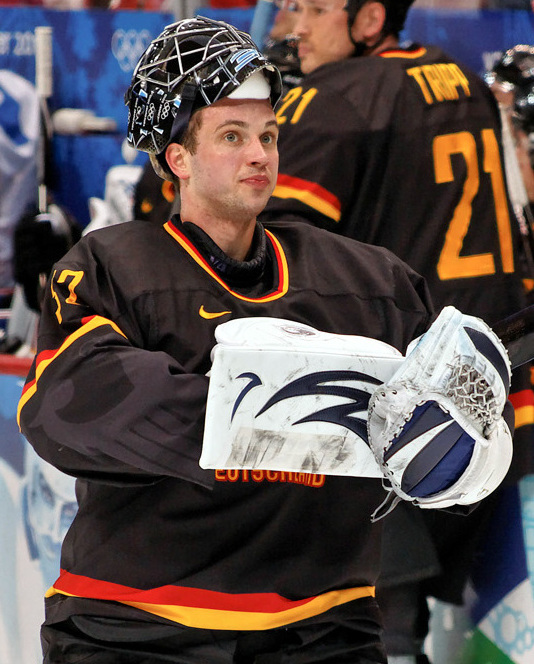
Dimitri Pätzold appeared in three games for Germany, winning one.

- Head coach: (Germany) Uwe Krupp

=== Skaters ===
Number	Position	Player	Club	GP	G	A	Pts	PIM
22	D	Michael Bakos	ERC Ingolstadt	6	1	1	2	8
46	F	Florian Busch	Eisbären Berlin	6	2	3	5	0
11	F	Sven Felski	Eisbären Berlin	6	0	1	1	6
72	F	Petr Fical	Sinupret Ice Tigers	6	0	0	0	2
57	F	Marcel Goc	San Jose Sharks	3	0	0	0	0
87	F	Philip Gogulla	Kölner Haie	6	1	3	4	6
33	F	Michael Hackert	Adler Mannheim	6	3	1	4	2
48	D	Frank Hördler	Eisbären Berlin	6	1	0	1	6
8	D	Sebastian Osterloh	Frankfurt Lions	6	0	0	0	20
24	F	André Rankel	Eisbären Berlin	2	0	0	0	2
63	D	André Reiss	Hannover Scorpions	3	0	0	0	2
31	D	Andreas Renz	Kölner Haie	6	0	2	2	4
7	D	Chris Schmidt	Iserlohn Roosters	6	2	4	6	2
13	D	Christoph Schubert	Ottawa Senators	6	1	2	3	12
5	D	Dennis Seidenberg	Carolina Hurricanes	6	0	0	0	14
36	F	Yannic Seidenberg	ERC Ingolstadt	6	1	2	3	4
19	F	Marco Sturm	Boston Bruins	6	2	1	3	6
21	F	John Tripp	Hamburg Freezers	6	0	1	1	0
47	F	Christoph Ullmann	Adler Mannheim	6	1	3	4	0
15	F	Stefan Ustorf	Eisbären Berlin	6	1	2	3	4
16	F	Michael Wolf	Iserlohn Roosters	6	1	2	3	4

=== Goaltenders ===
Number	Player	Club	GP	W	L	Min	GA	GAA	SV%	SO
1	Dimitrij Kotschnew	Iserlohn Roosters	1	0	1	20	4	12.00	.779	0
80	Robert Müller	Kölner Haie	3	1	2	159	11	4.14	.878	0
32	Dimitri Pätzold	Worcester Sharks	3	1	2	178	13	4.37	.884	0

== Italy ==
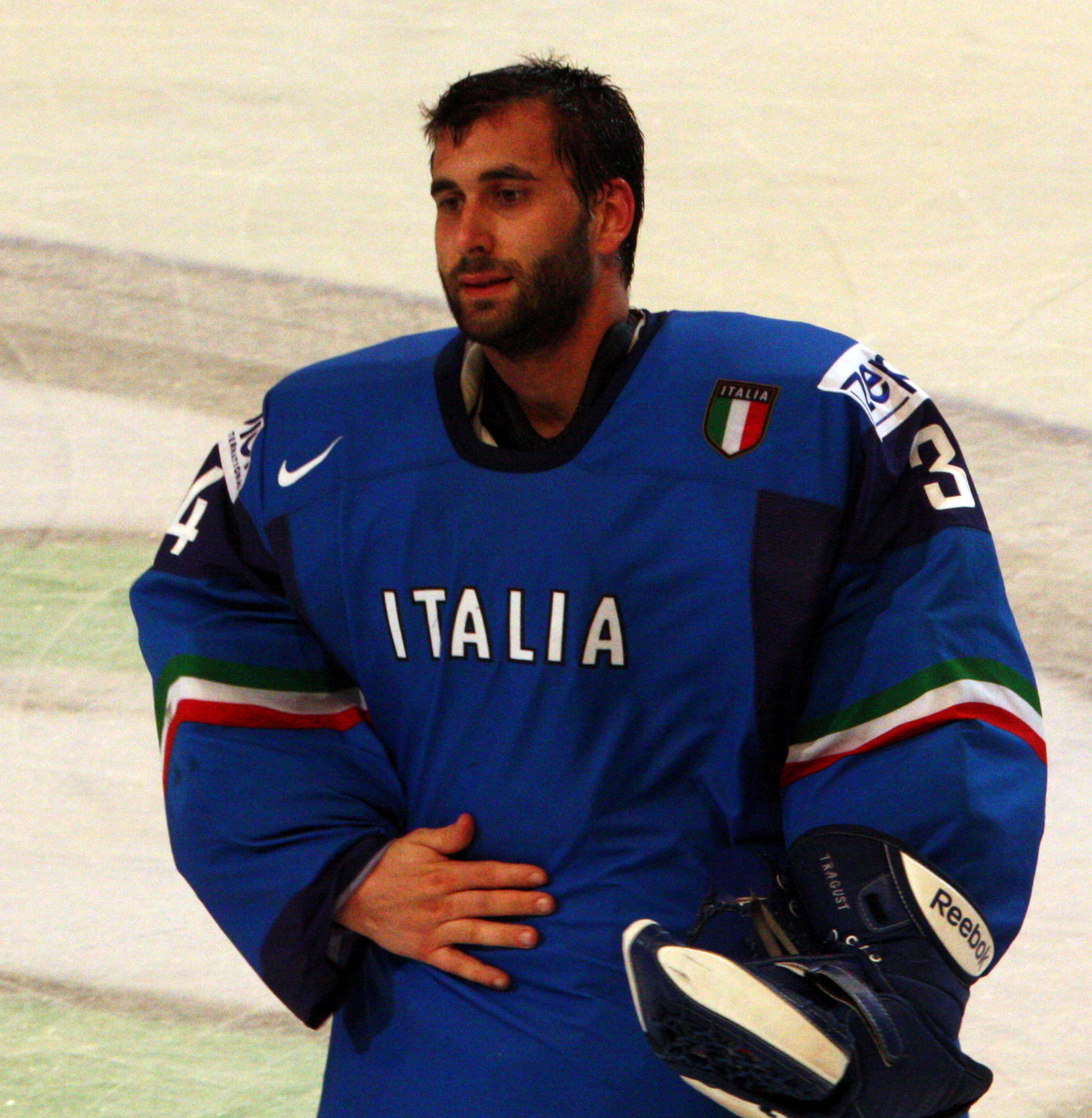
Thomas Tragust played four games for Italy.

- Head coach: (Italy) Fabio Polloni, (Canada) Michel Goulet

=== Skaters ===
Number	Position	Player	Club	GP	G	A	Pts	PIM
71	F	Luca Ansoldi	HC Bolzano 2000	5	1	1	2	4
50	D	Christian Borgatello	HC Bolzano 2000	5	0	1	1	2
18	F	Paolo Bustreo	Ritten Sport	5	0	1	1	4
24	F	Mario Chitarroni	HC Alleghe	5	0	1	1	10
34	F	Jason Cirone	Flint Generals	5	3	1	4	0
9	F	Giorgio de Bettin	SG Cortina	5	0	1	1	2
28	F	Manuel de Toni	HC Alleghe	5	0	0	0	0
87	F	Nicola Fontanive	HC Alleghe	5	2	1	3	2
26	D	Armin Helfer	HC Innsbruck Haie	5	1	1	2	4
73	GK	Günther Hell	HC Alleghe	5	0	1	1	0
7	D	Armin Hofer	HC Pustertal Valpusteria	5	0	0	0	0
17	F	Pat Iannone	Milano Vipers	5	1	2	3	16
8	F	Marco Insam	Milano Vipers	1	0	0	0	0
14	D	Carlo Lorenzi	HC Alleghe	3	0	0	0	0
25	D	Andreas Lutz	SG Pontebba	4	0	0	0	2
22	F	Stefano Margoni	SG Pontebba	5	0	0	0	4
16	F	John Parco	HC Asiago	2	0	0	0	0
39	F	Jonathan Pittis	HC Bolzano 2000	5	2	0	2	10
11	F	Roland Ramoser	HC Bolzano 2000	5	0	0	0	10
1	GK	Adam Russo	HC Bolzano 2000	0	0	0	0	0
10	F	Giulio Scandella	Milano Vipers	5	0	2	2	2
12	D	André Signoretti	Herning Blue Fox	4	1	2	3	6
6	D	Michele Strazzabosco	Milano Vipers	4	0	1	1	10
35	GK	Thomas Tragust	HC Fassa	4	0	0	0	0
3	D	Carter Trevisani	Milano Vipers	5	0	0	0	8

=== Goaltenders ===
Number	Player	Club	GP	W	L	Min	GA	GAA	SV%	SO
73	Günther Hell	HC Alleghe	5	0	5	205	17	4.96	.838	0
1	Adam Russo	HC Bolzano 2000	0	0	0	0	0	0	0	0
35	Thomas Tragust	HC Fassa	4	0	4	91	12	7.89	.813	0

== Latvia ==
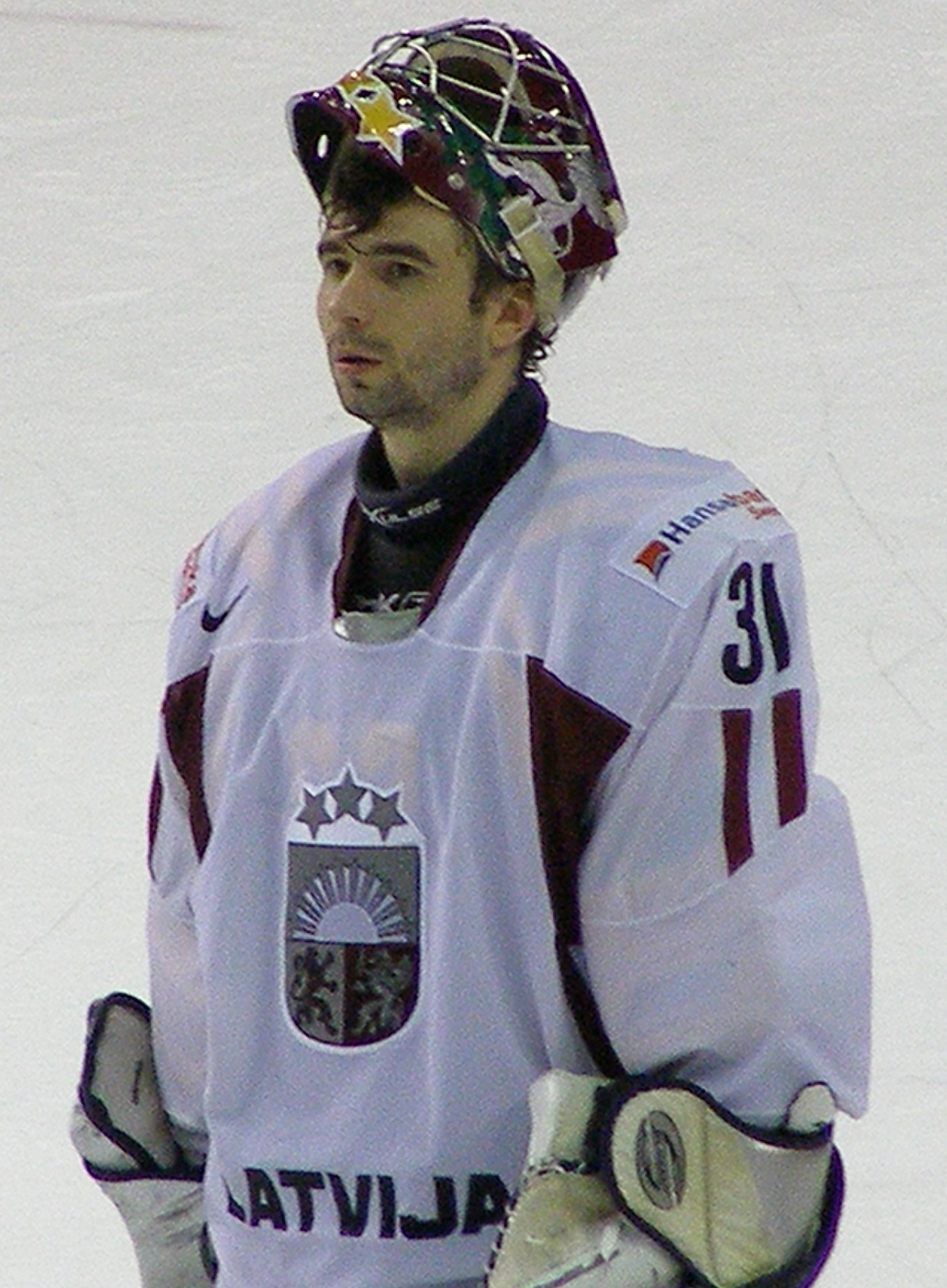
Goaltender Edgars Masaļskis appeared in all six games for Latvia.

- Head coach: (Germany) Oļegs Znaroks

=== Skaters ===
Number	Position	Player	Club	GP	G	A	Pts	PIM
21	F	Armands Bērziņš	HK Riga 2000	6	0	1	1	8
8	F	Viktors Bļinovs	HK Gomel	3	0	0	0	2
47	F	Mārtiņš Cipulis	Metallurg Zhlobin	6	1	2	3	2
10	F	Lauris Dārziņš	HK Gomel	6	2	1	3	16
11	F	Kaspars Daugaviņš	Binghamton Senators	6	0	0	0	0
13	D	Guntis Galviņš	Alba Volan SC	6	0	0	0	2
41	F	Raitis Ivanāns	Los Angeles Kings	6	0	0	0	31
15	D	Aleksandrs Jerofejevs	HC Slavia Praha	6	0	0	0	8
9	F	Mārtiņš Karsums	Providence Bruins	2	1	2	3	2
2	D	Rodrigo Laviņš	Södertälje SK	6	0	2	2	16
35	F	Aleksandrs Macijevskis	AaB Aalborg	3	0	0	0	0
17	F	Aleksandrs Ņiživijs	Torpedo Nizhny Novgorod	6	1	1	2	2
18	D	Georgijs Pujacs	Lada Togliatti	6	0	1	1	6
20	D	Jēkabs Rēdlihs	HC Lasselsberger Plzeň	4	0	0	0	2
25	D	Krišjānis Rēdlihs	Hamburg Freezers	6	0	0	0	10
24	F	Miķelis Rēdlihs	Metallurg Zhlobin	6	2	1	3	12
3	D	Arvīds Reķis	Augsburger Panther	6	0	0	0	10
4	D	Agris Saviels	Odense Bulldogs	6	0	0	0	4
16	F	Aleksejs Širokovs	Metallurg Zhlobin	6	2	0	2	4
5	F	Jānis Sprukts	Lukko Rauma	6	0	2	2	2
6	F	Juris Štāls	HK Riga 2000	6	0	0	0	2
12	F	Herberts Vasiļjevs	Krefeld Pinguine	6	2	1	3	10

=== Goaltenders ===
Number	Player	Club	GP	W	L	Min	GA	GAA	SV%	SO
31	Edgars Masaļskis	Metallurg Zhlobin	6	2	4	321	18	3.37	.910	1
30	Sergejs Naumovs	HK Gomel	1	0	1	37	1	1.61	.947	0
1	Dmitrijs Žabotinskis	HK Liepājas Metalurgs	0	0	0	0	0	0	0	0

== Norway ==
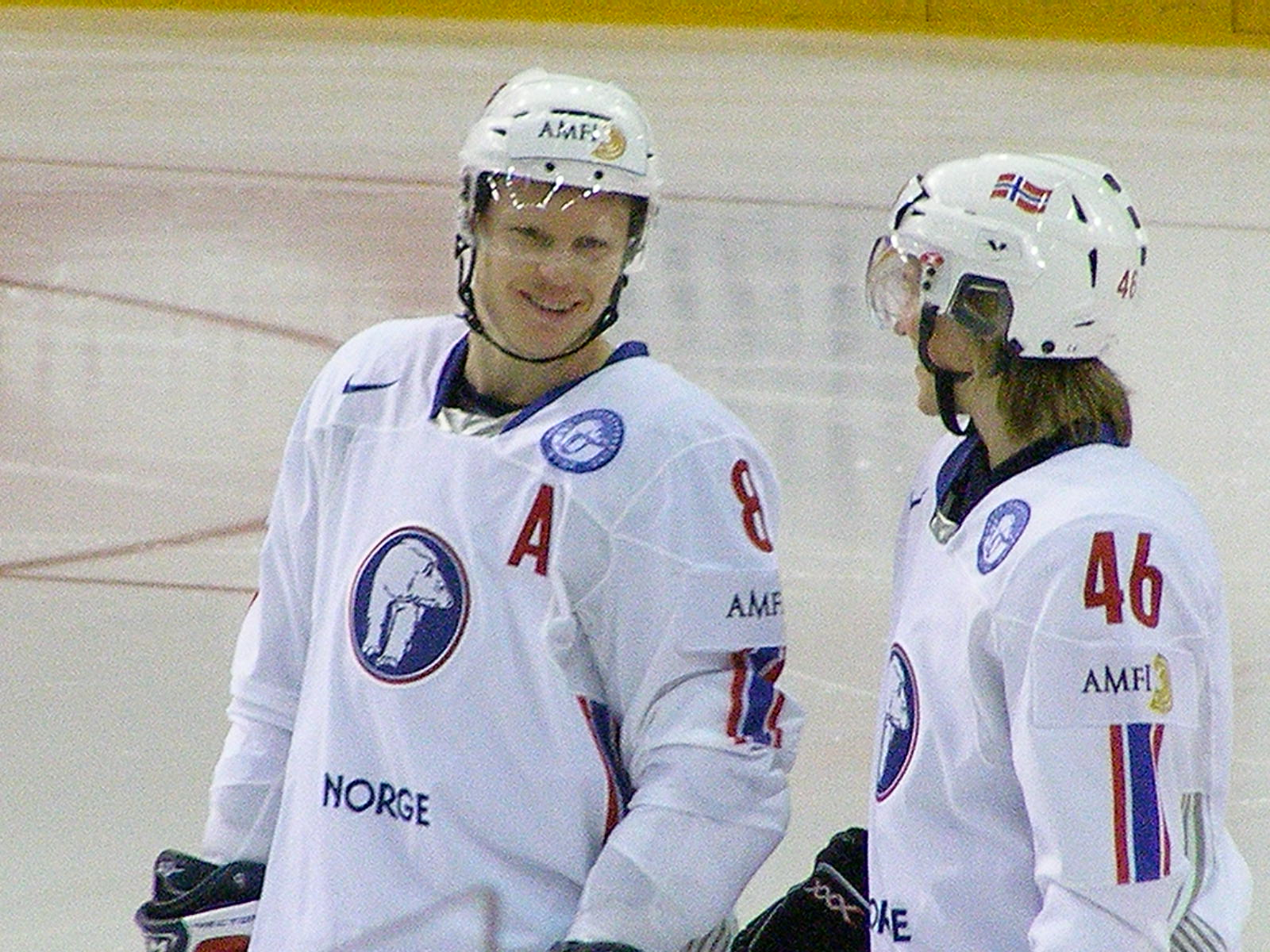
Mads Hansen (left) had three points in seven games, while Mathis Olimb (right) had two goals for Norway.

- Head coach: (Norway) Roy Johansen

=== Skaters ===
Number	Position	Player	Club	GP	G	A	Pts	PIM
48	F	Mats Zuccarello Aasen	Frisk Tigers	7	1	0	1	2
21	F	Morten Ask	Füchse Duisburg	7	3	2	5	8
20	F	Anders Bastiansen	Färjestad BK	7	1	5	6	4
26	F	Kristian Forsberg	Storhamar Dragons	7	0	0	0	0
27	F	Mats Frøshaug	Linköpings HC	7	0	0	0	4
8	F	Mads Hansen	Brynäs IF	7	1	2	3	8
17	D	Matthias Holmstedt	IK Comet Halden	1	0	0	0	2
6	D	Jonas Holøs	Sparta Warriors	7	0	1	1	6
9	F	Marius Holtet	Iowa Stars	7	1	1	2	4
7	D	Tommy Jakobsen	Graz 99ers	7	0	0	0	18
5	D	Juha Kaunismäki	Stavanger Oilers	6	0	0	0	4
54	D	Anders Myrvold	Vålerenga Oslo	7	0	0	0	22
28	F	Kjell Richard Nygård	Vålerenga Oslo	7	0	0	0	0
24	D	Henrik Ødegaard	Frisk Tigers	7	0	0	0	2
46	F	Mathis Olimb	Augsburger Panther	7	2	0	2	4
22	F	Martin Røymark	Sparta Warriors	7	0	1	1	2
16	D	Erik Ryman	AIK Stockholm	6	0	0	0	0
18	F	Eirik Skadsdammen	Storhamar Dragons	6	0	0	0	2
19	F	Per-Åge Skrøder	MODO Ornskoldsvik	7	0	1	1	2
10	F	Lars Erik Spets	Füchse Duisburg	7	1	1	2	0
23	D	Mats Trygg	Kölner Haie	7	1	4	5	8

=== Goaltenders ===
Number	Player	Club	GP	W	L	Min	GA	GAA	SV%	SO
33	Pål Grotnes	IK Comet Halden	6	1	6	346	26	4.51	.877	0
34	André Lysenstøen	Stavanger Oilers	1	0	1	60	5	5.00	.853	0
30	Ruben Smith	Storhamar Dragons	1	0	1	13	1	4.51	.900	0

== Russia ==
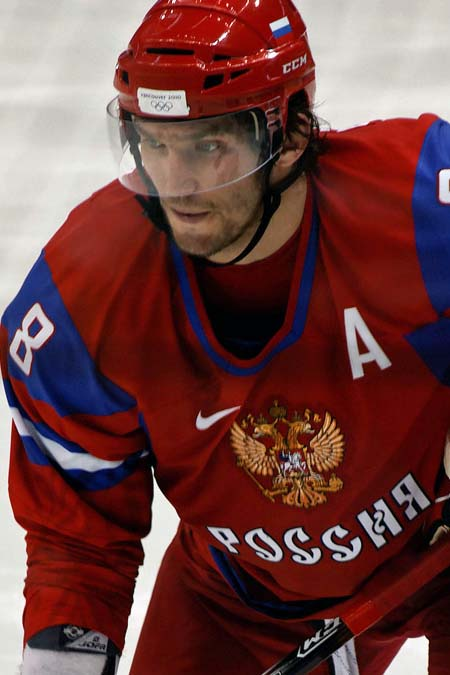
Tying for the team lead in goals, with six, Alexander Ovechkin helped Russia win its first gold medal in fifteen years.

- Head coach: (Russia) Vyacheslav Bykov

=== Skaters ===
vlevo
Number	Position	Player	Club	GP	G	A	Pts	PIM
61	F	Maxim Afinogenov	Buffalo Sabres	8	5	1	6	2
29	F	Sergei Fedorov	Washington Capitals	9	5	7	12	8
21	F	Konstantin Gorovikov	SKA Saint Petersburg	9	2	2	4	8
37	D	Denis Grebeshkov	Edmonton Oilers	9	0	6	6	2
7	D	Dmitri Kalinin	Buffalo Sabres	9	1	2	3	4
22	D	Konstantin Korneyev	CSKA Moscow	6	1	0	1	6
71	F	Ilya Kovalchuk	Atlanta Thrashers	8	2	6	8	52
52	D	Andrei Markov	Montreal Canadiens	6	0	2	2	4
55	D	Danny Markov	CSKA Moscow	8	0	1	1	2
95	F	Aleksey Morozov	Ak Bars Kazan	8	5	2	7	4
10	F	Sergei Mozyakin	Atlant Moscow Oblast	7	0	1	1	2
5	D	Ilya Nikulin	Ak Bars Kazan	9	0	1	1	0
8	F	Alexander Ovechkin	Washington Capitals	9	6	6	12	8
45	D	Vitali Proshkin	Salavat Yulaev Ufa	8	0	3	3	12
47	F	Alexander Radulov	Nashville Predators	6	0	3	3	2
28	F	Alexander Semin	Washington Capitals	9	6	7	13	8
33	F	Maxim Sushinski	SKA Saint Petersburg	9	4	1	5	6
27	F	Alexei Tereshchenko	Salavat Yulaev Ufa	9	2	4	6	2
51	D	Fedor Tyutin	New York Rangers	6	0	1	1	0
6	D	Dmitry Vorobiev	Lada Togliatti	5	0	1	1	4
25	F	Danis Zaripov	Ak Bars Kazan	8	3	4	7	0
42	F	Sergei Zinovjev	Ak Bars Kazan	9	1	5	6	12

=== Goaltenders ===
Number	Player	Club	GP	W	L	Min	GA	GAA	SV%	SO
35	Mikhail Biryukov	HK MVD Moscow Region	3	3	0	162	6	2.22	.912	0
30	Alexander Eremenko	Salavat Yulaev Ufa	2	2	0	86	3	2.10	.917	0
20	Evgeni Nabokov	San Jose Sharks	5	5	0	303	9	1.78	.923	2

== Slovakia ==
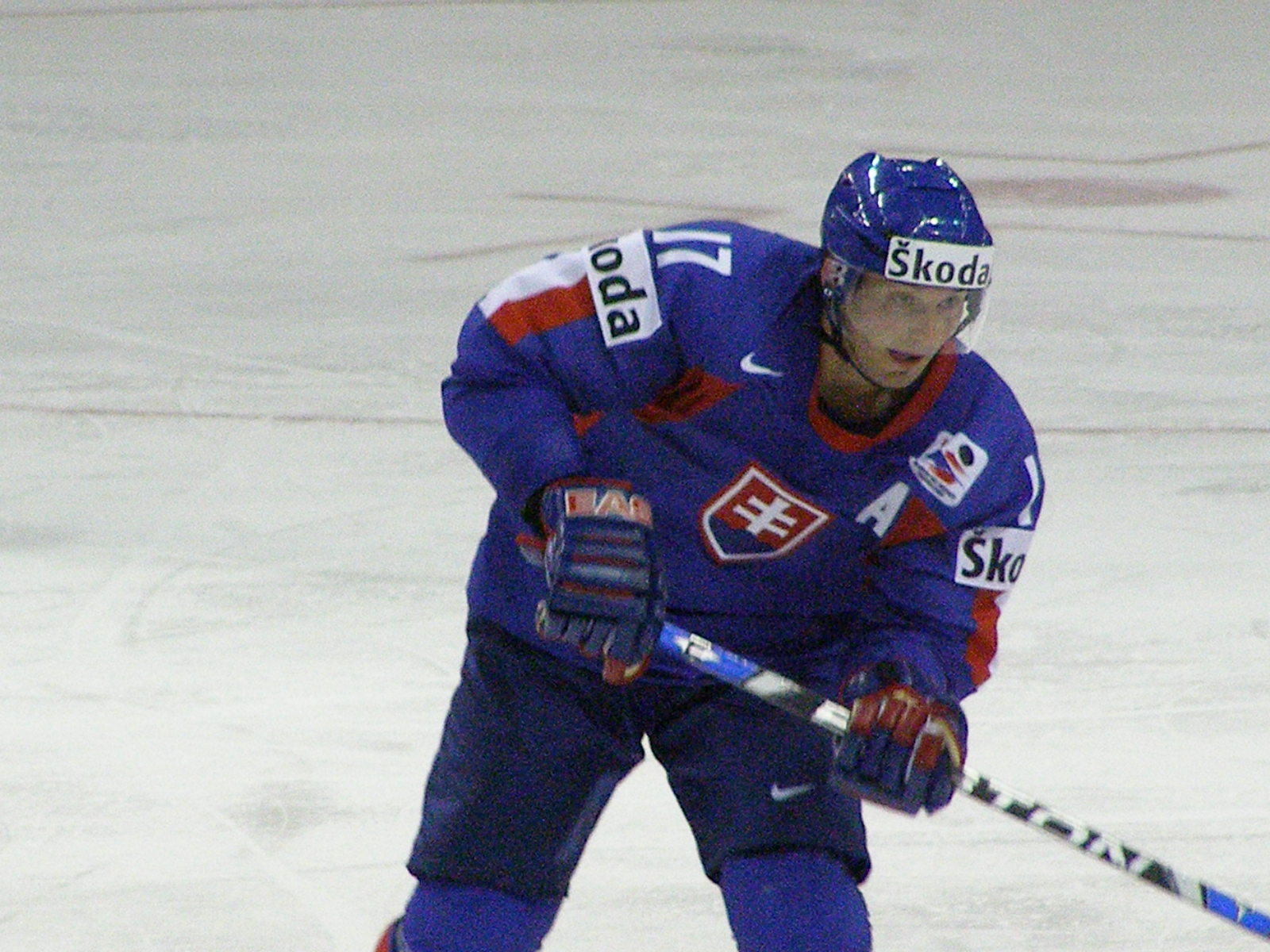
With two goals and seven assists, Ľubomír Višňovský led Slovakia in scoring.

- Head coach: (Slovakia) Július Šupler

=== Skaters ===
Number	Position	Player	Club	GP	G	A	Pts	PIM
27	F	Ivan Čiernik	Kölner Haie	5	2	2	4	6
79	F	Peter Fabus	HC Lasselsberger Plzeň	5	0	2	2	4
15	D	Dominik Graňák	Färjestad BK	5	0	1	1	4
81	F	Marcel Hossa	Phoenix Coyotes	5	2	5	7	2
9	F	Peter Húževka	Dukla Trenčín	5	0	1	1	0
72	F	Andrej Kollár	Dukla Trenčín	5	1	0	1	2
13	F	Juraj Kolník	Genève-Servette HC	5	3	4	7	2
47	F	Miroslav Kováčik	Skellefteå AIK	5	1	0	1	4
23	D	Ivan Majeský	Linköpings HC	5	0	0	0	8
26	F	Tibor Melichárek	Sparta Praha	4	1	0	1	2
24	D	Branislav Mezei	Florida Panthers	5	0	0	0	8
71	F	Juraj Mikuš	HK 36 Skalica	2	0	0	0	0
39	F	Róbert Petrovický	Leksands IF	5	4	2	6	2
37	D	Peter Podhradský	Metallurg Novokuznetsk	3	1	0	1	0
41	F	Andrej Podkonický	Bílí Tygři Liberec	5	1	1	2	2
44	D	Andrej Sekera	Buffalo Sabres	5	0	1	1	2
20	F	František Skladaný	Energie Karlovy Vary	5	0	1	1	4
21	F	Radovan Somík	HC Pardubice	4	0	0	0	2
19	D	Tomáš Starosta	Neftekhimik Nizhnekamsk	5	0	0	0	2
7	D	Martin Štrbák	Metallurg Magnitogorsk	5	0	0	0	0
17	D	Ľubomír Višňovský	Los Angeles Kings	5	2	7	9	0
8	D	René Vydarený	HC České Budějovice	2	0	0	0	0

=== Goaltenders ===
Number	Player	Club	GP	W	L	Min	GA	GAA	SV%	SO
31	Peter Budaj	Colorado Avalanche	1	0	1	59	3	3.03	.903	0
60	Karol Križan	Modo Hockey	0	0	0	0	0	0	0	0
25	Ján Lašák	HC Pardubice	4	3	1	245	9	2.20	.906	0

== Slovenia ==
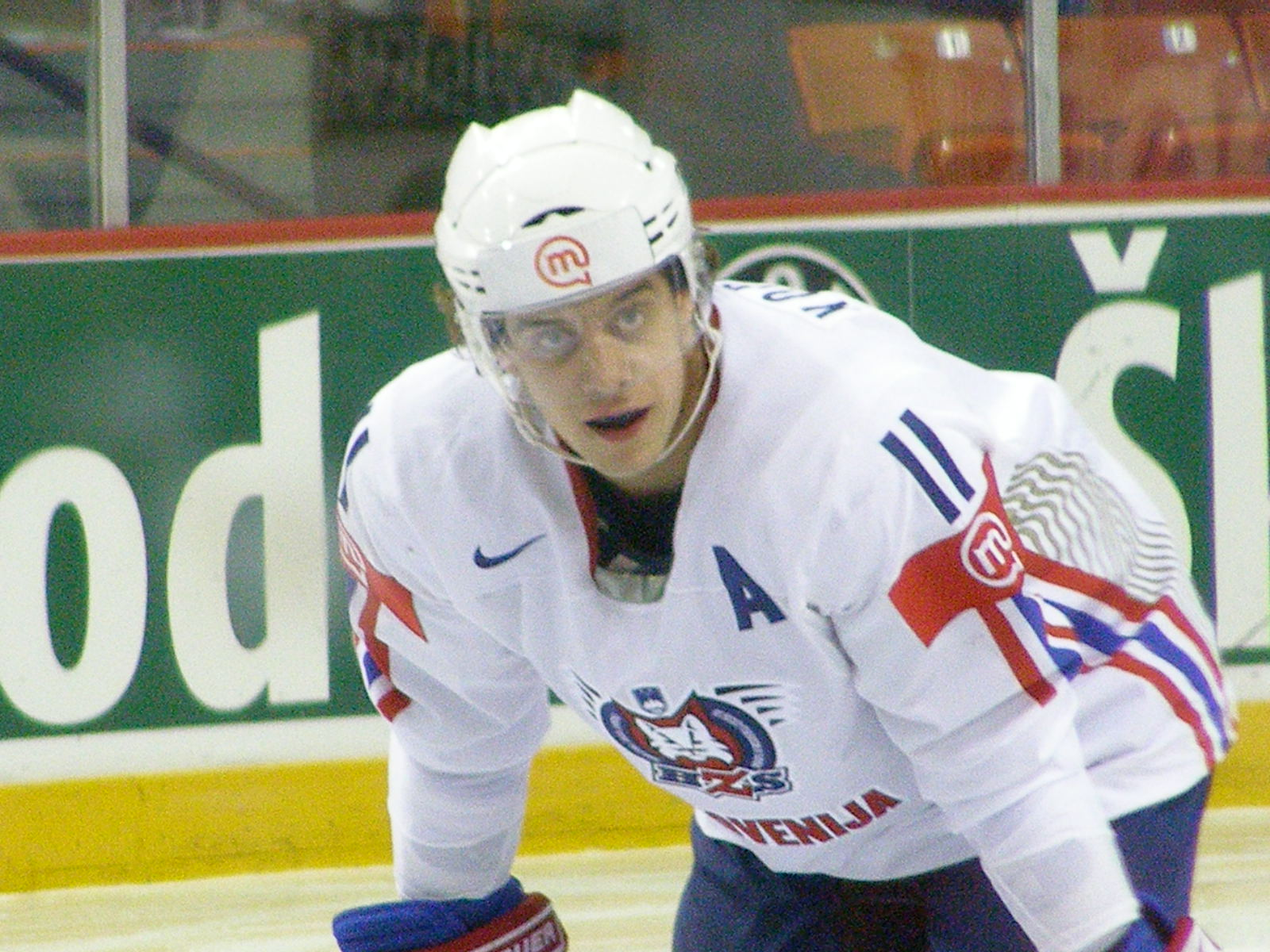
The only player from the NHL playing for Slovenia, Anže Kopitar led the team in both goals and points.

- Head coach: (Sweden) Mats Waltin

=== Skaters ===
Number	Position	Player	Club	GP	G	A	Pts	PIM
23	D	Damjan Dervarič	HK Jesenice	5	0	1	1	4
17	F	Jurij Goličič	HK Jesenice	5	0	0	0	2
91	F	Tomo Hafner	HK Jesenice	5	0	0	0	0
84	F	Andrej Hebar	HK Jesenice	5	0	0	0	6
11	F	Anže Kopitar	Los Angeles Kings	5	3	1	4	2
28	D	Aleš Kranjc	HK Jesenice	5	0	1	1	0
81	F	Marjan Manfreda	HD mladi Jesenice	1	1	0	1	2
51	D	Jakob Milovanovič	Briancon Diables Rouges	5	0	1	1	2
15	F	Egon Murič	Olimpija Ljubljana	4	0	0	0	2
16	F	Aleš Mušič	Olimpija Ljubljana	5	0	0	0	0
13	F	Rok Pajič	HC Vrchlabi	5	0	0	0	2
18	F	Gregor Polončič	HK Jesenice	4	0	0	0	2
14	F	Boris Pretnar	HK Jesenice	4	0	0	0	4
9	F	Tomaž Razingar	Innsbruck Haie	5	0	3	3	0
27	D	Miha Rebolj	Acroni Jesenice	5	0	0	0	8
37	D	Mitja Robar	Acroni Jesenice	5	1	1	2	4
12	F	David Rodman	Vienna Capitals	5	1	1	2	6
22	F	Marcel Rodman	Vienna Capitals	5	0	1	1	6
4	D	Andrej Tavželj	Olimpija Ljubljana	5	0	0	0	0
24	F	Anže Terlikar	HK Jesenice	2	0	0	0	0
10	D	Dejan Varl	HK Jesenice	5	0	0	0	10
77	D	Uroš Vidmar	HK Jesenice	5	0	0	0	2

=== Goaltenders ===
Number	Player	Club	GP	W	L	Min	GA	GAA	SV%	SO
30	Gar Glavič	HK Jesenice	0	0	0	0	0	0	0	0
1	Andrej Hočevar	HK Jesenice	2	0	2	85	4	2.82	.923	0
33	Robert Kristan	HK Jesenice	4	0	4	219	17	4.66	.904	0

== Sweden ==
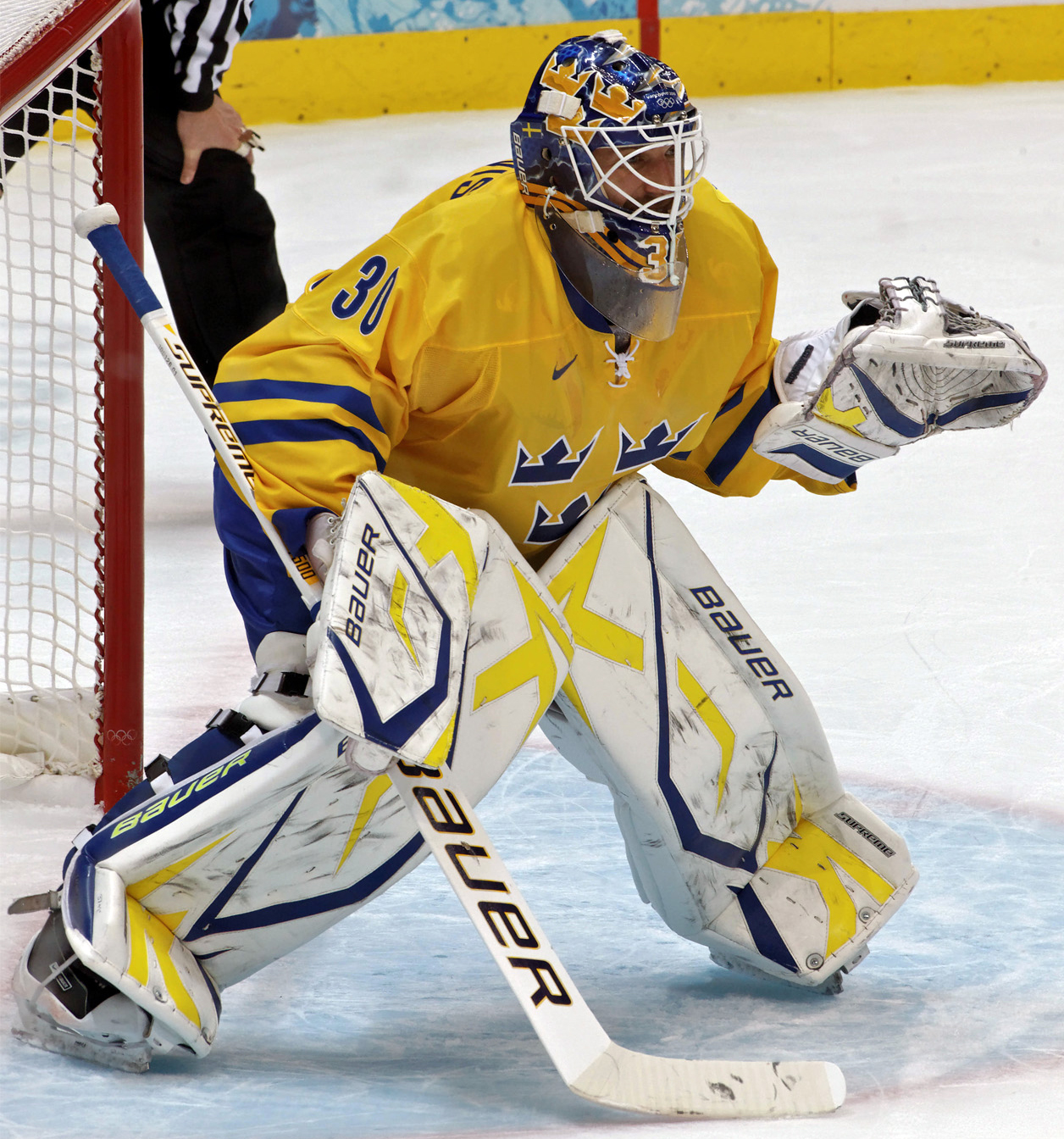
Henrik Lundqvist played in five games for Sweden, winning three of them.

- Head coach: (Sweden) Bengt-Åke Gustafsson

=== Skaters ===
Number	Position	Player	Club	GP	G	A	Pts	PIM
16	F	Johan Andersson	Timrå IK	9	0	1	1	2
19	F	Nicklas Bäckström	Washington Capitals	9	3	4	7	4
23	D	Alexander Edler	Vancouver Canucks	8	1	2	3	12
3	F	Nils Ekman	Atlant Moscow Oblast	9	0	6	6	4
12	F	Karl Fabricius	Frölunda HC	9	1	3	4	6
5	D	Daniel Fernholm	Linköpings HC	8	0	3	3	4
24	D	Jonas Frögren	Färjestad BK	9	0	3	3	8
17	F	Michael Holmqvist	Frölunda HC	7	0	0	0	6
10	F	Patric Hörnqvist	Djurgårdens IF	9	6	0	6	12
6	D	Magnus Johansson	Florida Panthers	9	1	2	3	8
29	D	Kenny Jönsson	Rögle BK	5	2	4	6	2
97	F	Per Ledin	HV71	7	0	5	5	4
9	F	Tony Mårtensson	Linköpings HC	9	4	5	9	4
2	D	Douglas Murray	San Jose Sharks	5	0	0	0	27
26	F	Marcus Nilson	Calgary Flames	9	4	2	6	2
27	F	Robert Nilsson	Edmonton Oilers	9	2	4	6	6
36	D	Anton Strålman	Toronto Maple Leafs	8	4	3	7	31
79	F	Fredrik Warg	Modo Hockey	9	2	5	7	0
41	F	Daniel Widing	Brynäs IF	3	0	0	0	0
7	D	Niclas Wallin	Carolina Hurricanes	7	2	2	4	33
15	F	Rickard Wallin	Färjestad BK	9	2	3	5	4
80	F	Mattias Weinhandl	Linköpings HC	9	5	8	13	2

=== Goaltenders ===
Number	Player	Club	GP	W	L	Min	GA	GAA	SV%	SO
1	Stefan Liv	HV71	3	1	2	178	6	2.02	.891	1
30	Henrik Lundqvist	New York Rangers	5	3	2	283	14	2.97	.911	0
32	Mikael Tellqvist	Phoenix Coyotes	2	1	1	79	5	3.78	.857	0

== Switzerland ==
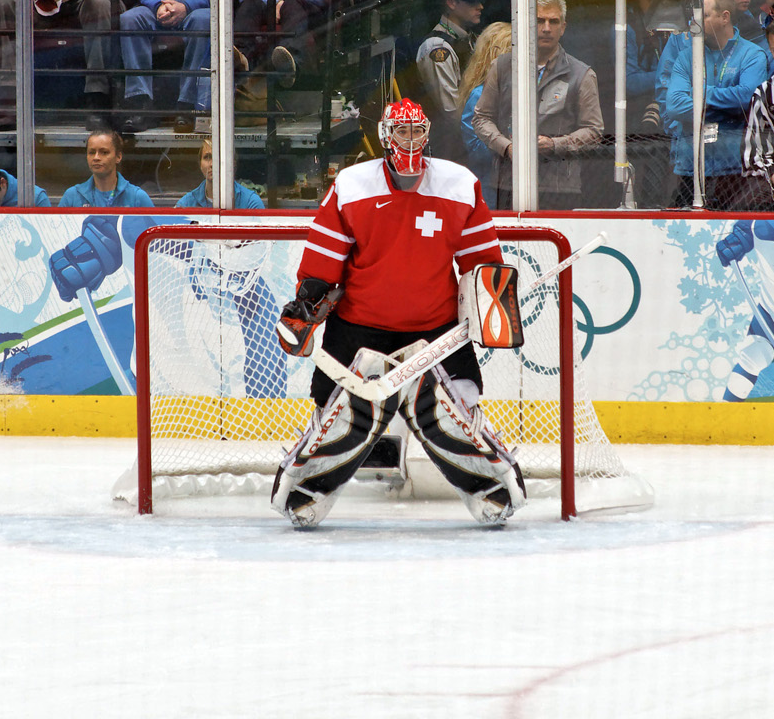
Jonas Hiller played in three games for Switzerland, winning one of them.

- Head coach: (Germany) Ralph Krueger

=== Skaters ===
Number	Position	Player	Club	GP	G	A	Pts	PIM
10	F	Andres Ambühl	HC Davos	7	2	3	5	2
61	F	Patrik Bärtschi	SC Bern	7	1	2	3	0
57	D	Goran Bezina	Genève-Servette HC	7	0	2	2	6
5	D	Severin Blindenbacher	ZSC Lions	6	0	3	3	2
18	F	Thomas Déruns	Genève-Servette HC	7	0	3	3	10
16	D	Raphael Diaz	EV Zug	7	0	0	0	0
15	F	Paul DiPietro	EV Zug	7	1	4	5	2
29	D	Beat Forster	ZSC Lions	7	2	2	4	2
54	D	Philippe Furrer	SC Bern	7	1	1	2	16
2	D	Beat Gerber	SC Bern	6	0	0	0	8
94	F	Peter Guggisberg	HC Davos	2	0	0	0	0
35	F	Sandy Jeannin	HC Lugano	7	1	1	2	2
67	F	Romano Lemm	Kloten Flyers	7	1	0	1	2
25	F	Thibaut Monnet	ZSC Lions	7	1	2	3	10
23	F	Thierry Paterlini	HC Lugano	7	2	1	3	4
36	F	Marc Reichert	SC Bern	7	1	0	1	2
39	F	Raffaele Sannitz	HC Lugano	7	2	2	4	10
31	D	Mathias Seger	ZSC Lions	4	0	0	0	0
86	F	Julien Sprunger	HC Fribourg-Gottéron	7	3	2	5	6
3	D	Julien Vauclair	HC Lugano	7	1	1	2	4
14	F	Roman Wick	Kloten Flyers	3	1	1	2	2
38	F	Thomas Ziegler	SC Bern	7	0	0	0	4

=== Goaltenders ===
Number	Player	Club	GP	W	L	Min	GA	GAA	SV%	SO
26	Martin Gerber	Ottawa Senators	5	3	2	267	14	3.15	.879	0
1	Jonas Hiller	Anaheim Ducks	3	1	2	151	7	2.79	.915	0
66	Ronnie Rueger	Kloten Flyers	0	0	0	0	0	0	0	0

== United States ==
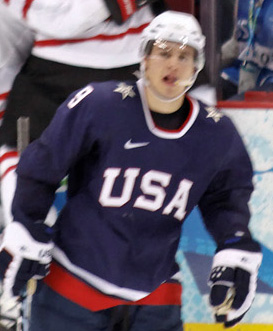
Zach Parise scored five goals and three assists for the United States.

- Head coach: (United States) John Tortorella

=== Skaters ===
Number	Position	Player	Club	GP	G	A	Pts	PIM
42	F	David Backes	St. Louis Blues	6	0	1	1	35
2	D	Keith Ballard	Phoenix Coyotes	5	0	2	2	16
7	F	David Booth	Florida Panthers	7	1	0	1	2
23	F	Dustin Brown	Los Angeles Kings	7	5	4	9	22
37	F	Adam Burish	Chicago Blackhawks	7	0	3	3	27
16	F	Brandon Dubinsky	New York Rangers	4	3	0	3	2
77	D	Tom Gilbert	Edmonton Oilers	7	1	3	4	0
6	D	Tim Gleason	Carolina Hurricanes	6	0	1	1	6
5	D	Matt Greene	Edmonton Oilers	7	0	0	0	38
11	F	Jeff Halpern	Tampa Bay Lightning	3	0	1	1	4
83	F	Patrick Kane	Chicago Blackhawks	7	3	7	10	0
8	F	Phil Kessel	Boston Bruins	7	6	4	10	6
4	D	Jordan Leopold	Colorado Avalanche	4	0	1	1	6
10	D	Paul Martin	New Jersey Devils	7	1	7	8	0
88	F	Peter Mueller	Phoenix Coyotes	7	0	4	4	0
9	F	Patrick O'Sullivan	Los Angeles Kings	7	3	3	6	2
17	F	Zach Parise	New Jersey Devils	7	5	3	8	2
29	F	Jason Pominville	Buffalo Sabres	7	2	3	5	0
19	F	Drew Stafford	Buffalo Sabres	7	1	3	4	6
12	F	Lee Stempniak	St. Louis Blues	7	0	3	3	6
22	D	Mark Stuart	Boston Bruins	7	0	0	0	4
43	D	James Wisniewski	Chicago Blackhawks	6	1	2	3	6

=== Goaltenders ===
Number	Player	Club	GP	W	L	Min	GA	GAA	SV%	SO
31	Craig Anderson	Florida Panthers	2	1	1	64	6	5.61	.714	0
35	Robert Esche	Ak Bars Kazan	4	2	2	198	7	2.12	.931	0
30	Tim Thomas	Boston Bruins	3	2	1	160	4	1.50	.925	1
