= Mads Christensen =

Mads Christensen may refer to:

- Mads Christensen (pastor) (1856–1929), New Zealand Lutheran pastor born in Denmark
- Mads Christensen (cyclist) (born 1984), Danish road and former track cyclist, currently riding for Team CULT Energy
- Mads Christensen (ice hockey, born 1984), Danish ice hockey defenceman
- Mads Christensen (ice hockey, born 1987), Danish ice hockey forward
- Mads Christensen (comedian) (born 1965), Danish comedian, author and public speaker
- Mads Græsbøll Christensen (born 1977), Danish professor in audio processing
