= AIFL =

AIFL may refer to:

- American Indoor Football Association, professional indoor football league
- America–Israel Friendship League, an American/Israeli non-profit
- The Art Institute of Fort Lauderdale, art and culinary school
