= Oleg Znarok =

Latvian ice hockey player

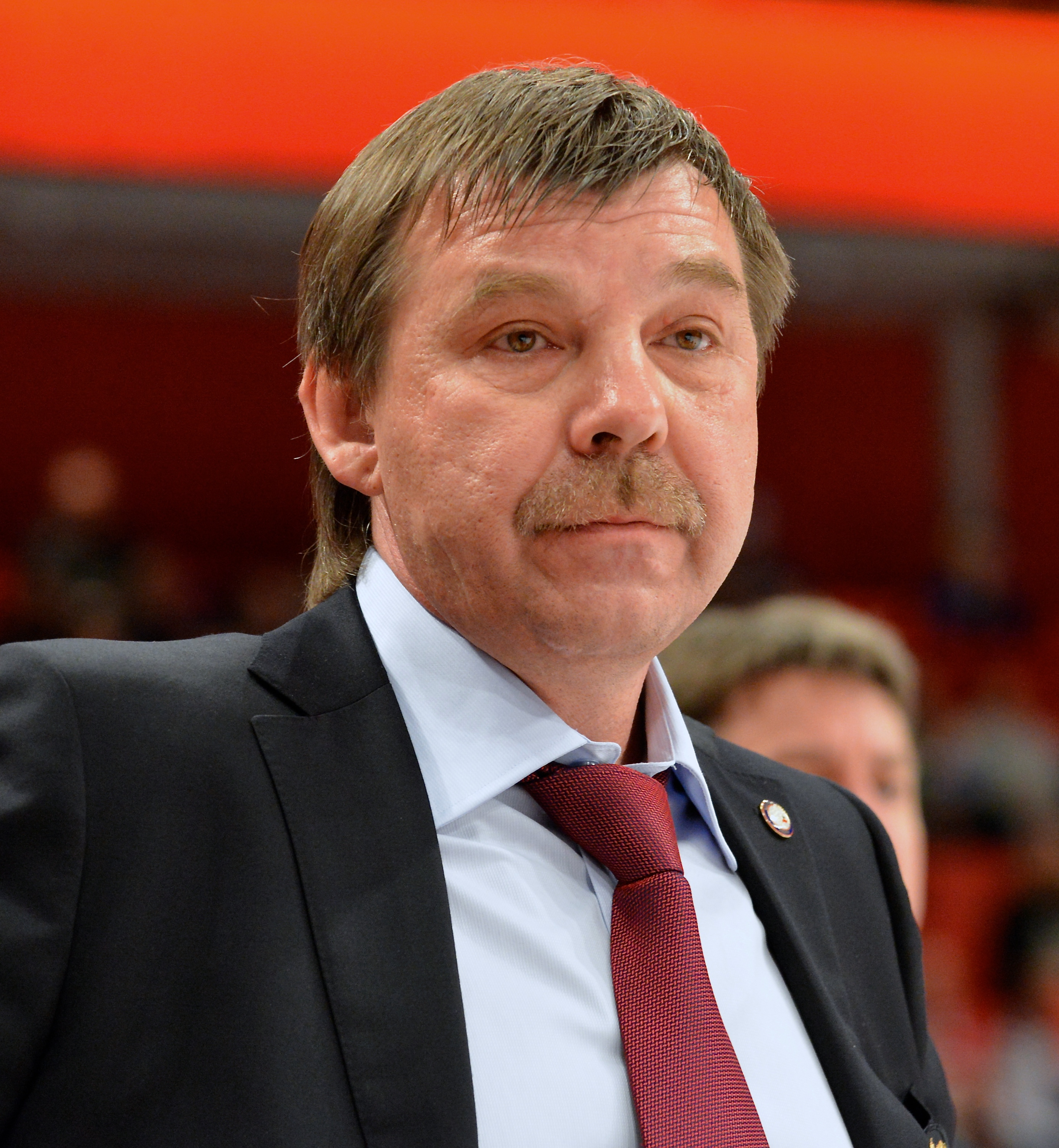
- Oleg Znarok in 2014
- Born: 2 January 1963 (age 63) Ust-Katav, Chelyabinsk Oblast, Russian SFSR, Soviet Union
- Height: 6 ft 0 in (183 cm)
- Weight: 198 lb (90 kg; 14 st 2 lb)
- Position: Centre
- Shot: Left
- Played for: Dinamo Riga; Vítkovice; EV Landsberg; EHC Freiburg; Heilbronner Falken
- National team: Soviet Union and Latvia
- Playing career: 1979–2002

Oleg Valerievich Znarok (Russian: Олег Валерьевич Знарок, Latvian: Oļegs Znaroks; born 2 January 1963) is a Soviet-Latvian professional ice hockey player. In 2022, he was the head coach of Ak Bars Kazan in the Kontinental Hockey League (KHL) and consultant of the Russia men's national ice hockey team.

Internationally, he guided Russia to gold, silver, two bronze performances in the 2014, 2015, 2016 and 2017 IIHF World Championships, respectively, and to a gold medal at the 2018 Winter Olympics. Znarok coached the Latvian national team at five IIHF World Championships, two IIHF World U-20 Championships and one IIHF World U-18 Championship.

He had coached Dynamo Moscow to back to back Gagarin Cup championships, in the 2011–12 and 2012–13 seasons, and a Continental Cup in 2013–14 season. As well taking HC MVD to an appearance in the Gagarin Cup final of the 2009–10 season, losing in seven games.

== Early and personal life ==
Oleg Znarok was born 2 January 1963 in Ust-Katav, Russian SFSR, USSR, present-day Russian Federation. His father, Valeri Znarok, was a football (soccer) player at the time, who later had a long coaching career. A young Oleg was introduced to hockey, when his grandfather brought him and his younger brother to a local skating rink.

Znarok had a successful and long career as a player before moving on to coaching. Playing for 23 years, across several leagues: Soviet, German, as well as several games in the Czech Extraliga and the AHL of North America.

One of Znarok's youth teammates from Traktor Chelyabinsk was Vyachislav Bykov, who played for CSKA Moscow and the Soviet National Team. Bykov, after a successful playing career, coached the Russian National Team to back to back gold medals in 2008 and 2009 at the IIHF World Championships. He'd be replaced (after finishing 6th at the 2010 Winter Olympics and 4th at the 2011 IIHF WC) in favor of Zinetula Bilyaletdinov, a former star player of rival Dynamo Moscow, who coached the Russian team to a gold medal in 2012, posting an undefeated record of 10–0. In turn, he too was replaced (after finishing 5th at the 2014 Winter Olympics): this time in favor of Znarok himself. Znarok coached Russia to a gold medal in 2014, also going 10–0, winning silver in 2015 and two bronze medals in 2016 and 2017. He also led Russia to a 4th-place finish at the 2016 World Cup of Hockey.

Oleg is married. He and his wife Ilona, have two daughters, Valeria and Alisa. Valeria is in marketing and Alisa is a model. Alisa is currently married to hockey player Artemi Panarin.

Oleg first saw his wife in the stands at a hockey game. She was not a sports fan, but came out to support her friends. Seeing her again at a post match celebration, at a local restaurant, Oleg worked up the courage to approach her. They have been together ever since.

Ilona has put together something of a museum of hockey memorabilia in the attic of their house. Among other items, it holds Znarok's ever-growing collection of medals, awards, and jerseys. One such item is an NHL contract that Oleg was given to sign by the Boston Bruins, untranslated. As Oleg did not speak English and had no one nearby to translate it for him, he turned it down when he thought the dollar amount was too low. It was only a decade later that he found out that the numbers written down, the only part he could understand, were for a monthly salary and not a yearly one.

== Playing career ==
Znarok started his ice hockey career at Traktor Chelyabinsk, making his debut in the 1979–80 season. Over the next few years he made intermittent appearances with the top team and played 18 games during the 1981–82 season. Although not productive at the senior level as a teenager, his first career goal came against the legendary Soviet goaltender Vladislav Tretiak.

From 1983 until 1991, he represented Dinamo Riga, where he became a top level player and an all-time club legend. The 1984–85 season saw Znarok's breakout with 27 points in 52 games. He scored 14 goals and 13 assists, after putting up only 3 assists in 30 games, the previous season. In 1987–88 season, he led his team to a second-place finish in the Soviet Championship League's playoffs, losing 3–1 to CSKA Moscow in the final. The 1990–91 season was Znarok's best individual season, putting up 51 points in 44 games scoring 24 goals, 27 assists. In total, he amassed 221 points over 361 games in the Soviet league. Scoring 101 goals and 120 assists.

In the 1991–92 season he played 6 games with the Maine Mariners of the American Hockey League (AHL), scoring 3 goals and 1 assist.

Znarok had a two-game (1 goal, 1 assist) outing in the Czech Extraliga during the 1993–94 playoffs, for Vítkovice.

Between the 1992–93 and 2001–02 seasons, he represented various clubs in Germany. In the 1992–93 season, he helped EV Landsberg earn a promotion from the Oberliga to the 2nd Bundesliga, on the strength of his astonishing 220 points in just 66 games, scoring 77 goals and 143 assists.

At the age of 30, he began his 9-year-long participation in the 2nd Bundesliga. He was a highly dominant player for the rest of his playing career, representing EV Landsberg, EHC Freiburg and Heilbronner EC. Scoring 1,069 points in 461 games in the regular season, on the strength of 388 goals and 681 assists. Also, adding 33 points (9 goals, 24 assists) over 22 playoff games. After the 2001–02 season, Znarok retired as a player. That season, he had put up 63 points (16 goals, 47 assists) over 45 games and added another 7 points (1 goal, 6 assists) in 6 playoff games.

== International play ==
=== Soviet Union ===
In 1981, Znarok was called up to the Soviet Union under-18 team, where he became a European champion, putting up 16 points (8 goals, 8 assists) in 5 games.

The 1989 Super Series, in which Soviet clubs faced National Hockey League (NHL) clubs, Dinamo Riga was one of two Soviet representatives. Znarok played in 3 games scoring 1 goal.

As he was a Dinamo Riga player, he was also a part of the larger Dynamo sports society. This allowed him in 1990 to be loaned to Dynamo Moscow's squad for their Super Series tour of North America. He scored 2 goals, including one against the Toronto Maple Leafs and one against the Buffalo Sabres, over 4 games.

In 1990, he was called up to the Soviet Union national team for the Japan Cup, where he put up 8 points (4 goals, 4 assists) over 4 games.

=== Latvia ===
Following the collapse of the Soviet Union, Znarok represented Latvia in international competition. He played in 5 IIHF World Championships and help promote Latvia to the top division of international competition in 1996. In 1997, he helped Latvia to its second best ever placing of seventh in the world. In total he put up 35 points in 34 games, scoring 18 goals.

His first effort was in Division B. Latvia finished second to Slovakia after 6 wins and 1 loss in 7 games. Znarok put up 8 points (4 goals, 4 assists) in 8 games and 18 PIM.

In his second effort, now as captain in 1996, Latvia improved to first in Division B after 6 wins and 1 draw in 7 games. Znarok led the tournament with 6 goals in 6 games and added 2 assists with 18 PIM, making the All-Star team. In the last game of the tournament, Latvia needed a tie or a win against Switzerland, to gain promotion. A loss would have given Switzerland the promotion. Down 1–0, Znarok scored to tie the game, 1–1. Latvia earned a promotion to the elite division for next year's championship.

In his third effort, Latvia faced some of the top national teams of the world, placed in a group with Canada, United States and Sweden. Not expected to show much, having just been promoted, Latvia greatly surprised the hockey world. Znarok lead the team with 10 points in 8 games. He was tied for 5th in tournament points and tied for 2nd in assists, with 7. Znarok led his team to a seventh-place finish, the highest ever finish for Latvia.

In his fourth effort and second as captain, Latvia finished ninth. In the consolation round establishing 9-12th place standings, there were some highlights. A 5–0 win over Germany and a 3–2 win against United States, avenging the previous year's loss. This sent the American and German teams to next year's qualification tournaments to fight against relegation. The American team was successful and remained in the elite division for 1999. The German team, however, was only back in the elite division in 2001. Znarok put up 8 points (5 goals, 3 assists) in 8 games.

The 1999 edition marked Znarok's fifth and final effort (third as captain). Latvia finished eleventh. As a result, next year they were forced to play a qualification tournament to remain in the elite group. At 36, Znarok only managed 1 assist and was limited to only 6 games.

== Career statistics ==
=== Regular season and playoffs ===
			Regular season					Playoffs
Season	Team	League	GP	G	A	Pts	PIM	GP	G	A	Pts	PIM
1979–80	Traktor Chelyabinsk	Soviet	1	0	0	0	0	—	—	—	—	—
1980–81	Traktor Chelyabinsk	Soviet	3	0	0	0	0	—	—	—	—	—
1980–81	Metallurg Chelyabinsk	URS.2	1	1	0	1	0	—	—	—	—	—
1981–82	Traktor Chelyabinsk	Soviet	18	1	0	1	6	—	—	—	—	—
1983–84	Dinamo Riga	Soviet	30	0	3	3	8	—	—	—	—	—
1984–85	Dinamo Riga	Soviet	52	14	13	27	34	—	—	—	—	—
1985–86	Dinamo Riga	Soviet	36	12	7	19	26	—	—	—	—	—
1986–87	Dinamo Riga	Soviet	40	13	12	25	34	—	—	—	—	—
1987–88	Dinamo Riga	Soviet	49	12	20	32	43	—	—	—	—	—
1988–89	Dinamo Riga	Soviet	37	10	10	20	22	—	—	—	—	—
1989–90	Dinamo Riga	Soviet	48	15	27	42	60	—	—	—	—	—
1990–91	Dinamo Riga	Soviet	44	24	27	51	58	—	—	—	—	—
1991–92	Stars Riga	CIS	3	0	1	1	6	—	—	—	—	—
1991–92	RASMS Riga	CIS.3	6	7	6	13	8	—	—	—	—	—
1991–92	Maine Mariners	AHL	6	3	1	4	11	—	—	—	—	—
1992–93	EV Landsberg	DEU.3	66	77	143	220		—	—	—	—	—
1993–94	EV Landsberg	DEU.2	56	66	122	188		—	—	—	—	—
1993–94	HC Vítkovice	ELH	—	—	—	—	—	2	1	1	2	0
1994–95	EV Landsberg	DEU.2	45	54	94	148	56	—	—	—	—	—
1995–96	EHC Freiburg	DEU.2	52	60	102	162	108	—	—	—	—	—
1996–97	EHC Freiburg	DEU.2	56	57	82	139	66	—	—	—	—	—
1997–98	EHC Freiburg	DEU.2	57	46	61	107	70	—	—	—	—	—
1998–99	EHC Freiburg	DEU.2	61	36	70	106	43	—	—	—	—	—
1999–2000	EHC Freiburg	DEU.2	45	30	57	87	56	6	6	8	14	8
2000–01	Heilbronner EC	DEU.2	44	23	46	69	22	10	2	10	12	10
2001–02	Heilbronner EC	DEU.2	45	16	47	63	28	6	1	6	7	2
Soviet/CIS totals			361	101	120	221	297	—	—	—	—	—
DEU.2 totals			461	388	681	1069	449	22	9	24	33	20

=== International ===
Year	Team	Event	Result	GP	G	A	Pts	PIM
1981	Soviet Union	EJC	1st place, gold medalist(s)	5	8	8	16	7
1995	Latvia	WC B	14th	6	4	4	8	18
1996	Latvia	WC B	13th	6	6	2	8	18
1997	Latvia	WC	7th	8	3	7	10	6
1998	Latvia	WC	9th	6	5	3	8	2
1999	Latvia	WC	11th	6	0	1	1	8
Senior totals				32	18	17	35	52

== Coaching career ==
After finishing his playing career, Znarok began coaching.

In 2002–03, he was an assistant coach for the Latvian national team, while in 2003–04, Znarok was the head coach of the under-18 national team, as well as the head for Prizma Riga of the Latvian Hockey Higher League. From 2004 to 2006, he was the head coach of the under-20 national team and the head coach of SK Riga 20 of the Latvian Hockey Higher League, and an assistant coach, with the Latvian national team at two World Championships, 2006 Olympic qualifiers and 2006 Olympics. From 2006 to 2011, Znarok coached the Latvian national team at five World Championships and at 2010 Olympics as well as coaching SK Riga 20 through the 2007–08 season.

From 2008 to 2014, Znarok was the head coach of MVD of Kontinental Hockey League (KHL) for two seasons, before its merger with Dynamo Moscow and continued head coaching for the next four seasons. On 26 March 2014, Znarok joined the Russian national team, and coached them at 3 World Championships, various stages of EHT and the 2016 World Cup of Hockey. Znarok achieved a flawless record with Russia during his first year as coach at the 2014 IIHF World Championship, although he has yet to beat the 29 World Championship game winning streak established by Vyacheslav Bykov. On 1 June 2016, he was named head coach of SKA Saint Petersburg, in the Kontinental Hockey League (KHL) with whom he won the 2016–17 Gagarin Cup. From 2016 to 2018, he was the head coach of both SKA and the Russian national team.

=== Coaching record ===
Team	Season	Regular season							Postseason
Team	Season	GP	W	OTW	L	OTL	Pts	Division Rank	Result
Kontinental Hockey League
MVD	2008–09	56	20	6	29	1	73	6th in Tarasov	Did not qualify
MVD	2009–10	56	30	1	15	10	102	2nd in Tarasov	Lost in Gagarin Cup Finals
Dynamo Moscow	2010–11	54	28	2	16	8	96	1st in Bobrov	Lost in Conference Quarter-Finals
Dynamo Moscow	2011–12	54	31	4	15	4	105	2nd in Bobrov	Won Gagarin Cup
Dynamo Moscow	2012–13	52	27	9	14	2	101	2nd in Bobrov	Won Gagarin Cup
Dynamo Moscow	2013-14	54	34	4	11	5	115	1st in Tarasov	Lost in Conference Quarter-Finals
SKA	2016–17	60	39	7	8	6	137	1st in Bobrov	Won Gagarin Cup
SKA	2017–18	56	40	7	5	4	138	1st in Bobrov	Lost in Conference Finals
Spartak	2019–20	62	26	8	19	9	77	4th in Bobrov	Lost in Conference Semifinals
Spartak	2020–21	60	20	8	25	7	63	4th in Bobrov	Lost in Conference Semifinals
KHL Totals		564	295	56	157	56	1007		4 Finals 3 Gagarin Cups 1 Continental Cup

=== International record ===
Team	Year	Type	GP	W	OTW	OTL	L	Result
Latvia	2007	WC	6	2	0	1	3	13th
Latvia	2008	WC	6	2	0	0	4	11th
Latvia	2009	WC	7	2	2	0	3	7th
Latvia	2010	OG	4	0	0	1	3	12th
Latvia	2010	WC	6	2	0	0	4	11th
Latvia	2011	WC	6	2	0	2	2	13th
Total:	10 won, 19 lost, 2 OT won, 2 OT lost							
Russia	2014	WC	10	10	0	0	0	Gold
Russia	2015	WC	10	6	1	1	2	Silver
Russia	2016	WC	10	8	0	0	2	Bronze
Russia	2016	WCH	4	2	0	0	2	Semi-finals
Russia	2017	WC	10	7	1	0	2	Bronze
Russia	2018	OG	6	4	1	0	1	Gold
Total:	37 won, 9 lost, 3 OT won, 1 OT lost							

== Awards and achievements ==
=== Playing awards ===
Soviet Union national under-18 team:

- 1981 – gold medal

Soviet Championship League:

- 1987-88 – silver medal

Latvian national team:

- 1996 Division B – gold medal
- 1996 Division B – All-Star Team

=== Coaching awards ===
Russian national team:

- 2014 – gold medal
- 2015 – silver medal
- 2016 – bronze medal
- 2016 WCH – 4th place
- 2017 – bronze medal
- 2018 – gold medal

KHL:

- Gagarin Cup – 2011–12, 2012–13, 2016–17
- KHL Coach of the year – 2009–10, 2011–12, 2012–13
- KHL Continental Cup – 2013–14

Latvian under-20 team:

- 2005 Division-1 Promotion to 2006 World Junior Ice Hockey Championships

=== State awards ===
- 2012 – Order of Friendship
- 2014 – Order of Honour

Sporting positions
Preceded by Petr Vorobiev	Latvian national ice hockey team coach 2006–2011	Succeeded by Ted Nolan
Preceded by Zinetula Bilyaletdinov	Russian national ice hockey team coach 2014–2018	Succeeded by Ilya Vorobiev
