= EV Landsberg =

Landsberg Riverkings
- City: Landsberg am Lech, Germany
- League: Oberliga
- Founded: 2008; 18 years ago
- Home arena: Eisstadion am Hungerbachweg (capacity: 3,000)
- Colours
- Head coach: Randy Neal
- Website: hc-landsberg.de

EV Landsberg was the name of two ice hockey clubs in Landsberg, Bavaria, Germany.

The first club was outsourced from the soccer club TSV 1880 Landsberg in 1957 and played until 1999–2000. The senior team played in the German 2nd Division for more than 30 years. In 1966 they came close to winning promotion to the top division, only losing out in a decisive playoff match against Berliner SC. Notable players were former USA Hockey executive Jim Johannson, and former Russian national team head coach Oleg Znarok.

The second club with the original name EV Landsbeg 2000 was founded in 2000 when the first EV Landsberg collapsed. The club was renamed EV Landsberg in 2010 and collapsed in 2011. The senior team of the 2nd EV Landsberg started playing in the lowest division in the 2000–01 season and played also some seasons in the German 2nd Division. In the last season, the team played in the Oberliga – the third tier of ice hockey in Germany.

The current ice hockey club at Landsberg - the HC Landsberg Riverkings - was founded in 2008 - the senior team of that club has played in the 4th tier, the regional "Bayernliga", since the season 2011–12. Since 2015 the Riverkings cooperate with DEL member Augsburger Panther.

== Achievements ==
- EV Landsberg
  - Oberliga (2nd tier) champions: 1966.
  - Regionalliga champion: 1967.
- EV Landsberg 2000:
  - Oberliga champion: 2006.
