= Kenneth Barner =

American information engineer

Kenneth E. Barner from the University of Delaware, Newark, DE was named Fellow of the Institute of Electrical and Electronics Engineers (IEEE) in 2016 for contributions in nonlinear signal processing.
