= Barner Stücker See =

Lake in Klein Trebbow, Germany

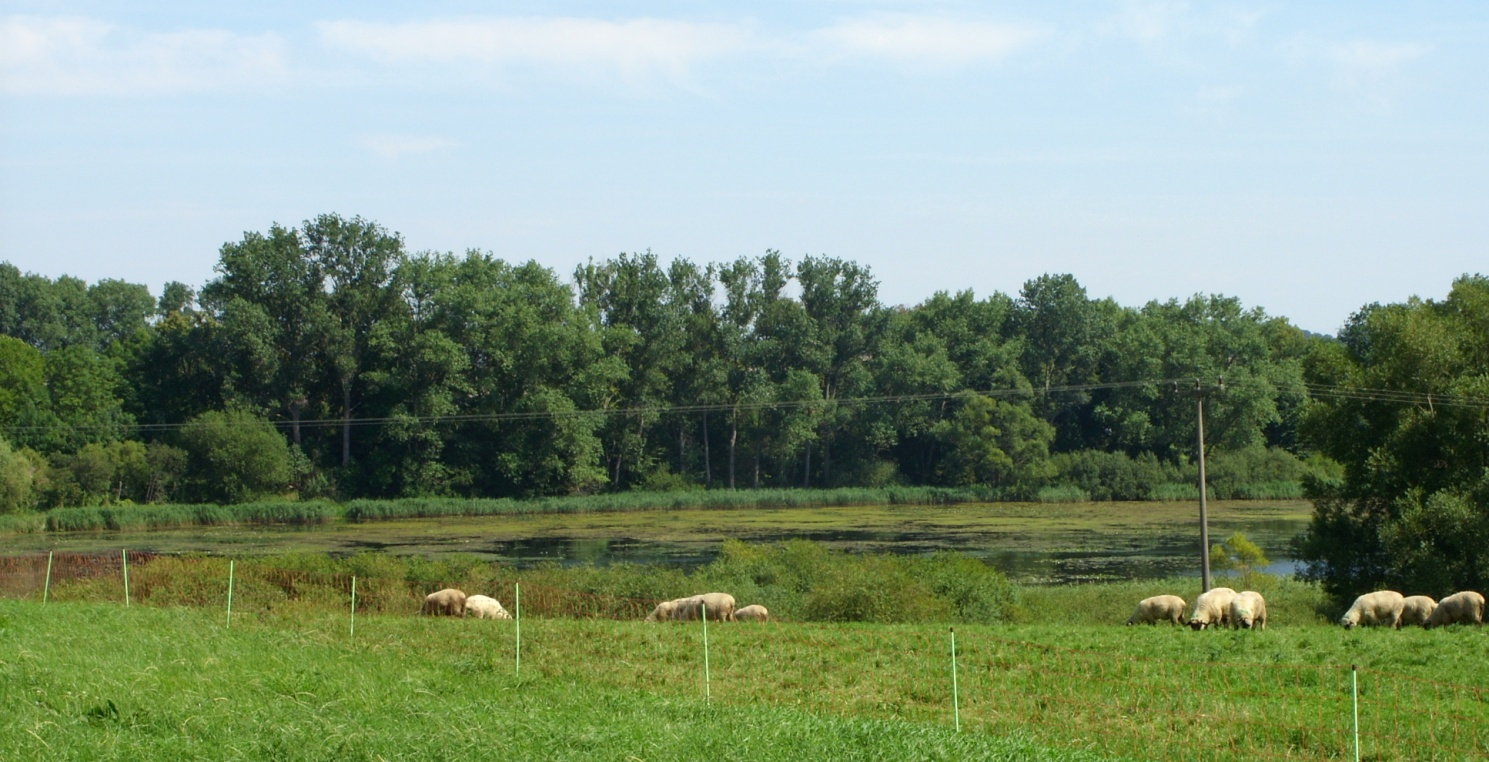

- Location within Mecklenburg-Vorpommern
- Location: Nordwestmecklenburg, Mecklenburg-Vorpommern
- Coordinates: 53°41′10″N 11°23′39″E
- Primary inflows: Aubach, Kleiner Aubach
- Primary outflows: Aubach
- Basin countries: Germany
- Surface area: 0.102 km^{2} (0.039 sq mi)
- Surface elevation: 39.9 m (131 ft)

Barner Stücker See is a lake in Nordwestmecklenburg, Mecklenburg-Vorpommern, Germany. At an elevation of 39.9 metres (131 ft), its surface covers 0.102 square kilometres (0.039 mi^{2}).

The lake is used for carp fishing.
