= Barnor =

Barnor is a surname. Notable people with the surname include:

- James Barnor (born 1929), Ghanaian photographer
- Ricky Barnor (born 1943), Ghanaian boxer
