= Peter Húževka =

Slovak ice hockey player

- Born: 9 September 1976 (age 48); Púchov, Czechoslovakia
- Height: 6 ft 5 in (196 cm)
- Weight: 212 lb (96 kg; 15 st 2 lb)
- Position: Forward
- Shoots: Left
- Slovak Extraliga team Former teams: MsHK Žilina; HK Dubnica; HK Dukla Trenčín; HC Košice; HC Vítkovice; Yertis Pavlodar; HC Olomouc
- National team: Slovakia
- Playing career: 1995–present

Peter Húževka (born 9 September 1976) is a Slovak professional ice hockey player currently playing for MsHK Žilina of the Slovak Extraliga.
