= Fabio Polloni =

Italian ice hockey player and coach

- Born: April 8, 1953 (age 71); Italy
- Position: Forward
- Shot: Left
- Played for: Serie A SG Cortina
- NHL draft: Undrafted
- Playing career: 1970–1988

Fabio Polloni (born April 8, 1953) is an Italian former professional ice hockey player. He has been a coach with the Italy men's national ice hockey team since 2004.

Polloni served as an assistant coach for Team Italy at the 2006 Winter Olympics and as Italy's head coach at the 2008 IIHF World Championship.
