= Teddy Trabichet =

French ice hockey player

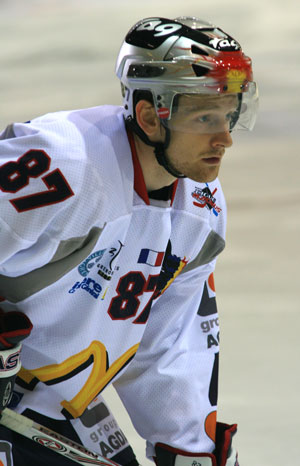
- Born: March 10, 1987 (age 38); Échirolles, France
- Height: 5 ft 10 in (178 cm)
- Weight: 198 lb (90 kg; 14 st 2 lb)
- Position: Defence
- Shoots: Left
- France team Former teams: Brûleurs de Loups; Gothiques d'Amiens; Diables Rouges de Briançon; Rapaces de Gap
- National team: France
- NHL draft: Undrafted
- Playing career: 2008–present

Teddy Trabichet (born March 10, 1987) is an ice hockey defenceman who plays for Brûleurs de Loups of the Ligue Magnus.

Trabichet has played for the France national team at the 2008, 2011 2015 and 2016 World Ice Hockey Championships.
