= Dmitrijs Žabotinskis =

Latvian ice hockey player

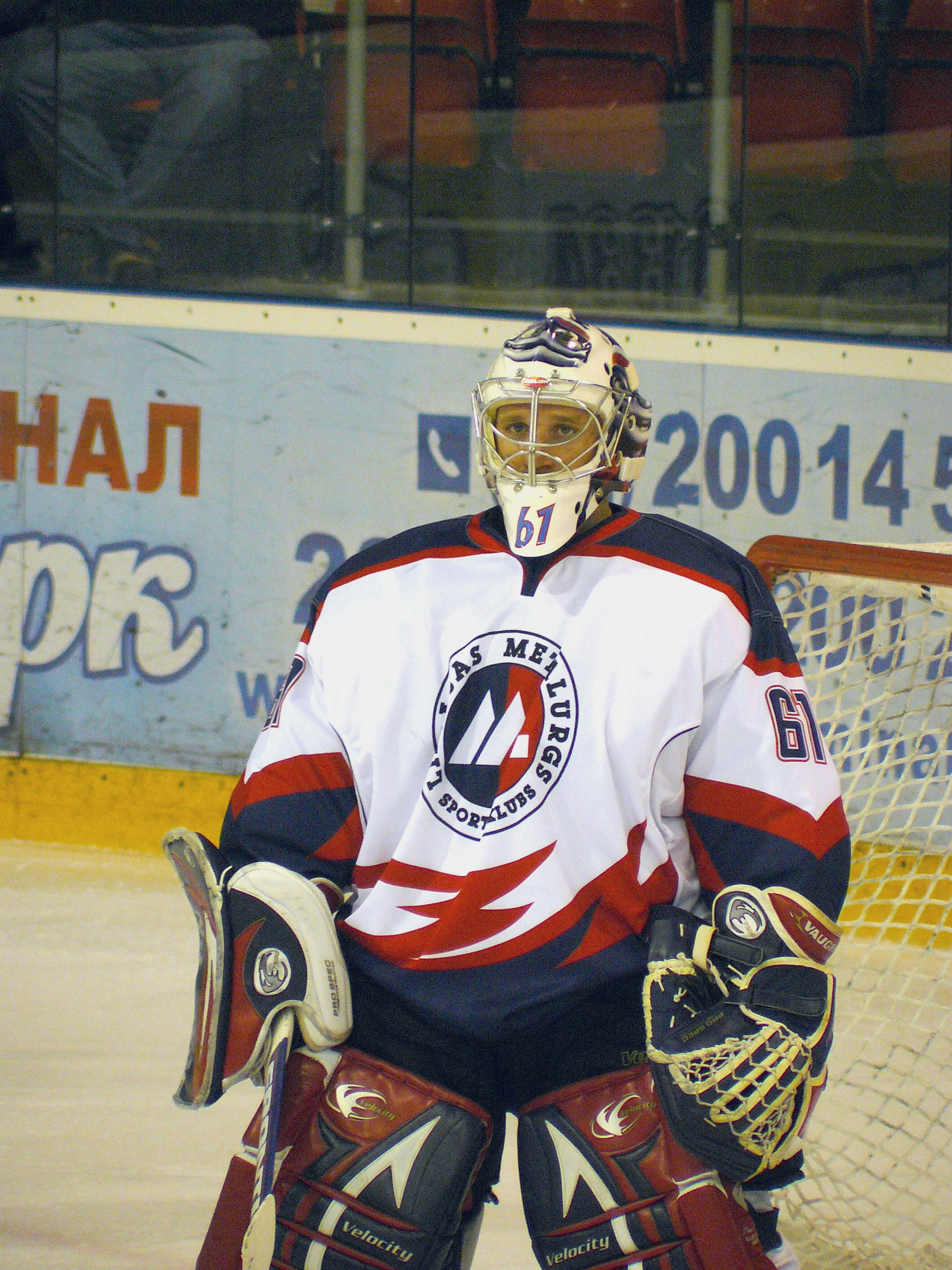
- Born: 19 January 1980 (age 45); Ogre, Soviet Union
- Height: 5 ft 7 in (170 cm)
- Weight: 176 lb (80 kg; 12 st 8 lb)
- Position: Goaltender
- Catches: Left
- Played for: HK Lido Nafta Riga; HK Riga; Liepājas Metalurgs; HK Riga 2000; ASK Ogre; Hamm; Timmendorfer Strand
- National team: Latvia
- Playing career: 1996–present

Dmitrijs Žabotinskis (born 19 January 1980) is a Latvian ice hockey goaltender, who plays for the HK Kurbads. Žabotinskis has played several games for team Latvia. He made Latvian world championship roster in 2008 and 2009 championships
