= Uri Bar-Ner =

Israeli diplomat

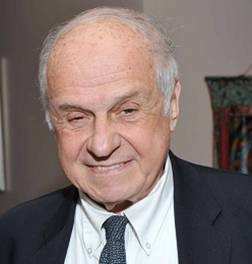
Uri Bar-Ner

Uri Bar-Ner (Hebrew: אורי בר-נר) is a senior adviser to the President of the America-Israel Friendship League, the former Israeli ambassador to Turkey from 1998–2001, and he served as Israeli Consul General in Chicago and Deputy Consul General in New York City, USA. Bar-Ner was the deputy Director General of the Israeli Ministry of Foreign Affairs and served in diplomatic missions in Europe and Asia. He has a Bachelor of Arts from Hebrew University of Jerusalem and a Master of Arts in political science from Emory University.

Bar-Ner has been active in promoting Israel through the AIFL. Specifically, he helped to mitigate a disinvestment campaign by the Presbyterian church; Bar-Ner arranged a trip through AIFL for priests and senior clergy, after which the church abolished the resolution calling for divestment.
