= America–Israel Friendship League =

Non-profit organization

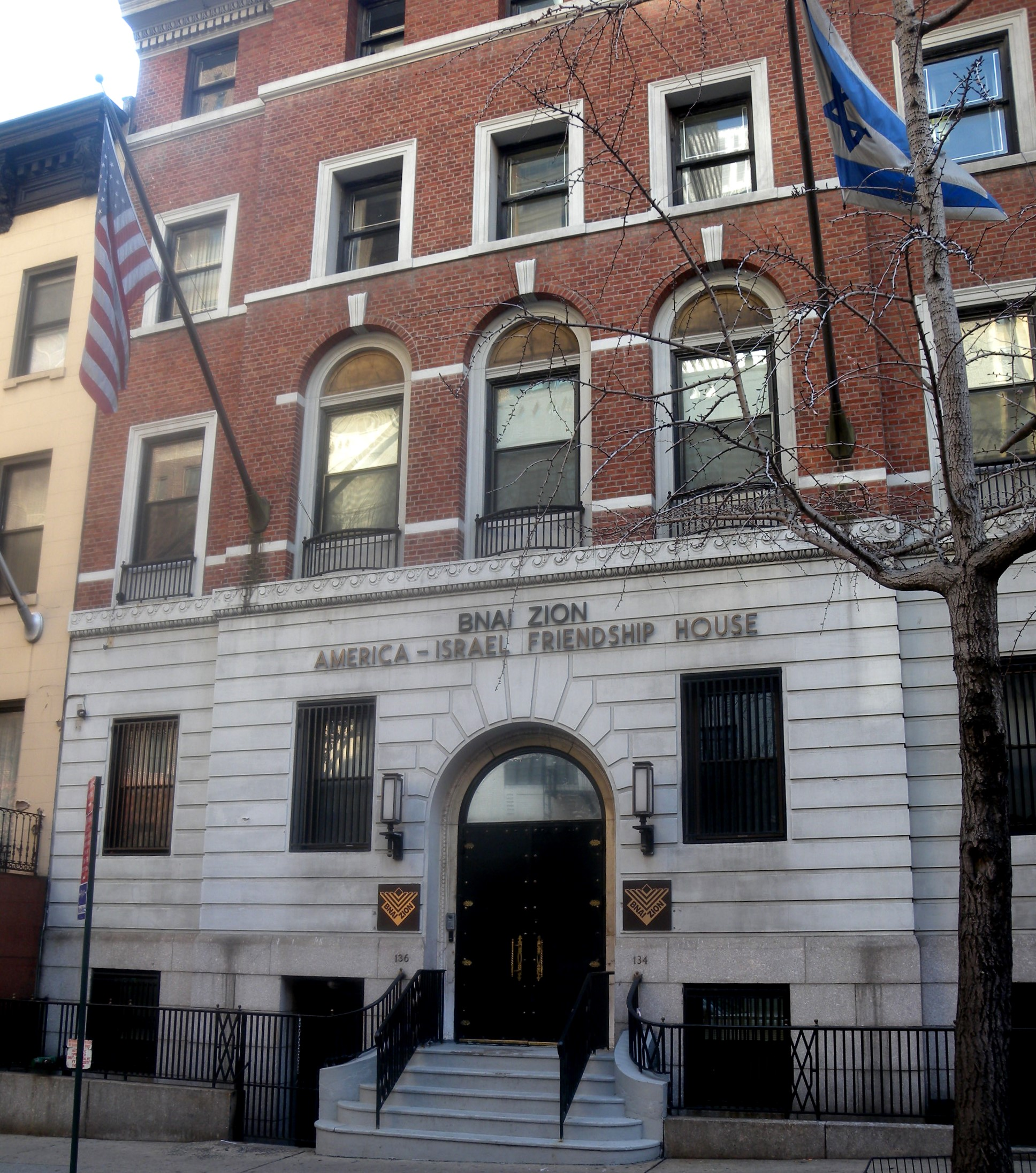
America-Israel Friendship House, New York

The America–Israel Friendship League (AIFL) is an American-Israeli non-profit organization dedicated to strengthening ties between Americans and Israelis based on shared democratic values. The AIFL brings Americans of all faiths to Israel, and Israelis of all faiths (Jews, Christians and Muslims) to the United States.

== History ==
The organization was founded in 1971 by Vice President Hubert Humphrey, U.S. Senators "Scoop" Jackson and Nelson Rockefeller, U.S. Representative Herbert Tenzer, civil rights leader A. Philip Randolph, and others. The AIFL sends delegations to Israel to forge U.S. business, technological, humanitarian and personal relationships with partners in Israel.

The AIFL's U.S. national office is located in New York City, and its Israeli office in Tel Aviv. It has three chapters located in Tucson, Arizona, San Francisco, California and Salt Lake City, Utah. It most recently opened the Salt Lake City chapter.

AIFL leaders were among those who rang the opening bell at the New York Stock Exchange when the exchange celebrated its fifth annual Israel Day.

== See also ==
- Uri Bar-Ner
