= Mads Græsbøll Christensen =

Danish researcher

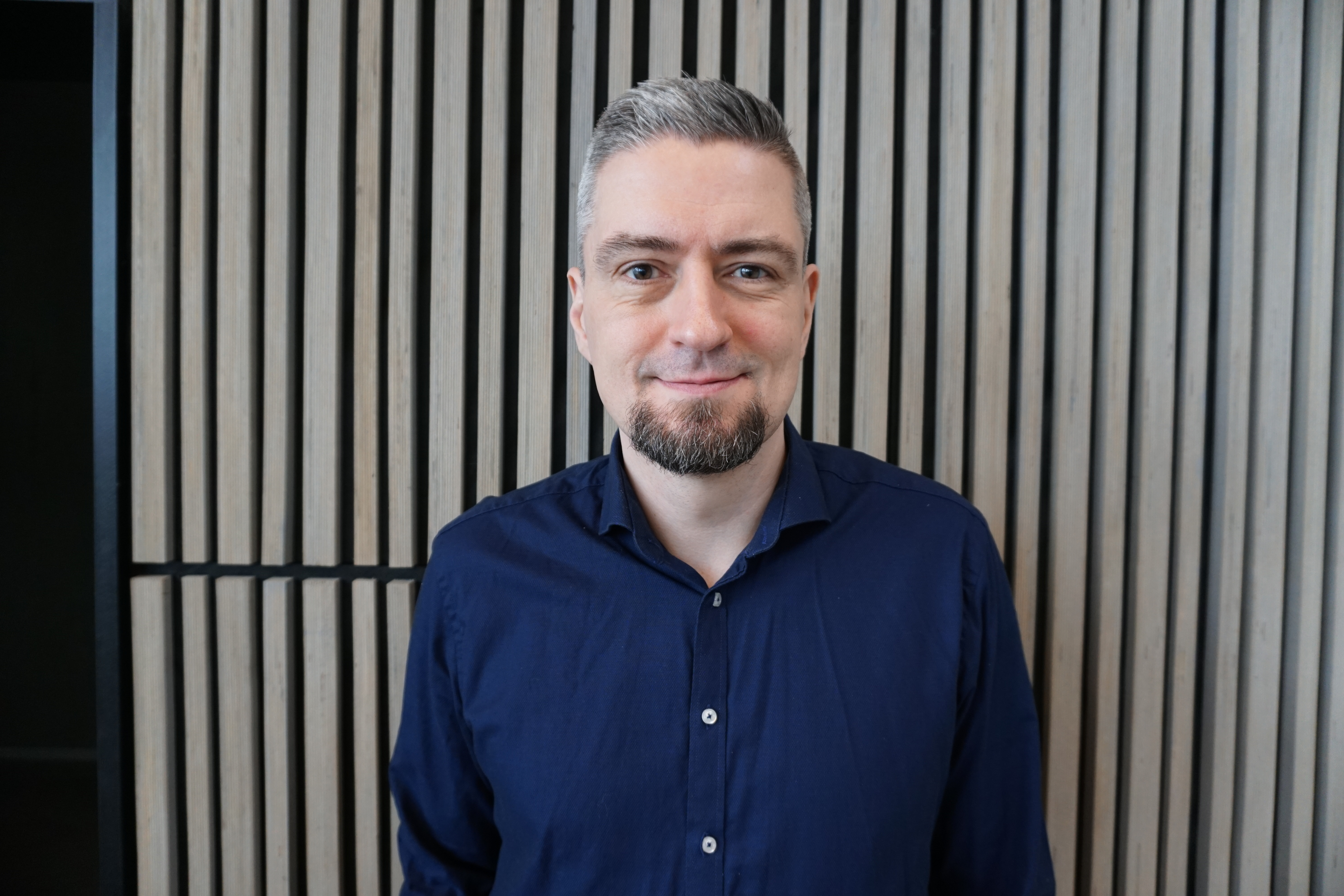
- Professor Mads Græsbøll Christensen
- Born: 1977 (age 48–49); Copenhagen, Denmark
- Citizenship: Denmark
- Education: Aalborg University
- Scientific career
- Fields: Design & Media Technology

Mads Græsbøll Christensen is a Danish Professor in Audio Processing at Department of Architecture, Design & Media Technology, Aalborg University, where he is also head and founder of the Audio Analysis Lab which conducts research in audio and acoustic signal processing. Before that he worked at the Department of Electronic Systems at Aalborg University and has held visiting positions at Philips Research Labs, ENST, UCSB, and Columbia University. He has published extensively on these topics in books, scientific journals and conference proceedings, and he has given tutorials and keynote talks at major international scientific conferences.

== Short Biography ==
Mads Græsbøll Christensen was born in 1977 in Copenhagen, Denmark. He received the M.Sc.Eng. in Signal Processing in 2002 and the Ph.D. degree in 2005, both from Aalborg University in Denmark. From 2005 until 2009 he was Postdoctoral Researcher and then Assistant Professor with Dept. of Electronic Systems at Aalborg University, before joining Dept. of Architecture, Design & Media Technology in 2009 as first Associated Professor and then Full Professor.

== Research ==
Mads Græsbøll Christensen's research interests lie within audio and acoustic signal processing. He has worked on both theoretical and practical aspects of signal processing with application to speech and audio. He has worked on topics such as signal compression, estimation theory, signal modeling, model selection, sparse approximations, spectral analysis, array signal processing, and classification. His research has many applications including, for example, in hearing aids, audio streaming, internet telephony, information retrieval, speech analysis, music transcription, and diagnosis of illnesses from voice signals. He is perhaps best known for his work on statistical methods for pitch estimation, sparse linear prediction, and model-based statistical processing of speech and audio signals. He has been involved in several major national and international research projects funded by the Danish Independent Research Council, the Villum Foundation, Innovation Fund Denmark, and the European Commission.

At Aalborg University, he is founder and head of the Audio Analysis Lab. The lab was founded in 2012 and is located at the Dept. of Architecture, Design & Media Technology. The lab conducts research in methods for analysis, recognition, and processing of audio signals and works closely with both industry (e.g., GN Resound, B&O) and other universities (e.g., Lund University, KU Leuven, Northwestern Polytechnical University, University of Quebec). The current research focuses mainly on audio and acoustic signal processing and machine learning for audio processing. As of 2016, the lab counts 15 members, most of which are funded by projects. Prof. Jacob Benesty of University of Quebec is affiliated with the lab as Adjunct Professor.

== Awards and honors ==
- EURASIP Early Career Award 2016 awarded annually to an outstanding researcher and engineer at an early or mid-stage of their career, for significant contributions to statistical processing of audio and speech signals.
- IEEE Signal Processing Society Outstanding Editorial Board Member Recognition Award 2016 for outstanding editorial board service for the IEEE Transactions on Audio, Speech, and Language Processing.
- Co-author of paper that received an IEEE Signal Processing Society Young Author Best Paper Award 2014.
- Statoil Prize 2013, awarded annually to an especially talented young researcher at a Danish university who has a strong research track record and has made an impact internationally.
- Recipient of VILLUM Young Investigator grant awarded to especially talented up-and-coming researchers in science and technology with ambitions of creating their own, independent research identity.
- A Danish Independent Research Council's Young Researcher's Award 2007, awarded to talented, young researchers who have carried out research of a very high quality within their field.
- Spar Nord Foundation's Research Prize 2006, awarded annually for an excellent Ph.D. thesis at Aalborg.
- IEEE Int. Conf. Acoust., Speech, Signal Proc. 2006 Student Paper Contest Award, for the paper Computationally Efficient Amplitude Modulated Sinusoidal Audio Coding using Frequency-Domain Linear Prediction

== Selected publications ==
- S. M. Nørholm, J. R. Jensen, and M. G. Christensen, “Instantaneous pitch estimation with optimal segmentation for non-stationary voiced speech,” IEEE Trans. Audio, Speech, Language Process., vol. 24(12). pp. 2354–2367, 2016.
- J. K. Nielsen, T. L. Jensen, J. R. Jensen, M. G. Christensen, and S. H. Jensen, "Fast fundamental frequency estimation: Making a statistically efficient estimator computationally efficient", Elsevier Signal Process., vol. 135, pp. 188–197, Jun, 2017.
- J. R. Jensen, J. Benesty, and M. G. Christensen, “Noise reduction with optimal variable span linear filter,” IEEE Trans. Audio, Speech, Language Process., vol. 24(4), pp. 631–644, 2016.
- J. K. Nielsen, M. G. Christensen, A. T. Cemgil, and S. H. Jensen, “Bayesian model comparison with the g-prior,” IEEE Trans. Signal Process., vol. 62(1), pp. 225–238, 2014.
- M. G. Christensen, “Accurate estimation of low fundamental frequencies,” IEEE Trans. Audio, Speech, Language Process., vol. 21(10), pp. 2042–2056, 2013.
- D. Giacobello, M. G. Christensen, M. N. Murthi, S. H. Jensen, and M. Moonen, “Sparse linear prediction and its applications to speech processing,” IEEE Trans. Audio, Speech, Language Process., vol. 20(5), pp. 1644–1657, 2012.
- M. G. Christensen and A. Jakobsson, “Optimal filter designs for separating and enhancing periodic signals,” IEEE Trans. Signal Process., vol. 58(12), pp. 5969–5983, 2010.

== Affiliations and Service ==
He is an Associate Editor for IEEE/ACM Trans. on Audio, Speech, and Language Processing, a former Associate Editor of IEEE Signal Processing Letters, a member of the IEEE Audio and Acoustic Signal Processing Technical Committee, and a founding member of the EURASIP Special Area Team in Acoustic, Sound and Music Signal Processing. He is Senior Member of the IEEE and a Member of EURASIP. He has served on the technical program committee of several major conferences and is Technical Program Co-Chair of WASPAA 2017.
