= Mads Christensen (ice hockey, born 1984) =

Danish ice hockey player

- Born: 3 November 1984 (age 40); Frederikshavn, Denmark
- Height: 6 ft 1 in (185 cm)
- Weight: 187 lb (85 kg; 13 st 5 lb)
- Position: Defence
- Shoots: Left
- ML team: Frederikshavn White Hawks
- National team: Denmark
- NHL draft: Undrafted
- Playing career: 2000–present

Mads Bech Christensen (born 3 November 1984) is a Danish professional ice hockey defenceman who is currently playing in Denmark with the Frederikshavn White Hawks. He participated at the 2010 IIHF World Championship as a member of the Denmark men's national ice hockey team.
