= Mads Christensen (comedian) =

Danish comedian and author (born 1965)

Mads Christensen or Mads Barner-Christensen (who goes by the moniker: blærerøven, in English: "bragging ass" = "show-off")(b. 1965) is a Danish comedian, author and public speaker, known for conservative and masculine themes. He is a former army officer from the Royal Life Guards, and has been a lifestyle and fashion editor of the magazine Euroman.

== Bibliography ==
He has published several books including:

- Den Store Blærerøv (1998)
- Blærerøvens guide til moderne etiquette (1999)
- SEX - Hvor svært Kan Det Være (2000)
- Den store blærerøv - En guide til manden (2006)
- Blærerøv og Bjerrehuus - with Suzanne Bjerrehuus (2006)
- Blærerøven vender tilbage (2007)
- Manual til mænd med sure koner (2009)

== Controversy ==
In April 2012, Dell hired Christensen to entertain the crowd after a presentation by Michael Dell in Copenhagen, Denmark. Dell later apologized for Christensen's remarks after a blog about the comments went viral.
