= List of Men's World Ice Hockey Championship players for Canada (1977–present) =

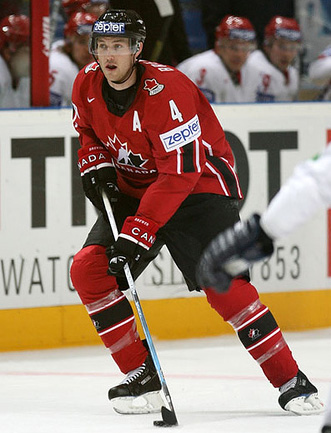
Defenceman Eric Brewer has won three gold medals, more than any other Canadian player at the tournament since 1977.

Canada has participated in 70 of 79 Ice Hockey World Championships, an annual ice hockey tournament organized by the International Ice Hockey Federation (IIHF). During the first 40 years of the tournament (1920–1961), Canada did not have a national team, instead choosing to send a club team, typically the Allan Cup winner. A national team program, consisting of amateur players, was implemented following the 1961 tournament. By the late 1960s, the Canadian Amateur Hockey Association (CAHA) felt their amateur players could no longer be competitive and pushed for the ability to use players from professional leagues. At the IIHF Congress in 1969, the IIHF voted to allow Canada to use nine non-National Hockey League (NHL) professional players at the 1970 World Championships, but the decision was reversed in January 1970. In response, Canada withdrew from international ice hockey competition. Canada's ice hockey team did not participate in the 1972 and 1976 Winter Olympics. Günther Sabetzki became president of the IIHF in 1975 and helped to resolve the dispute with the CAHA. The IIHF agreed to allow "open competition" between all players in the World Championships, and moved the competition to later in the season so players not involved in the NHL playoffs could participate. The first open World Championship was held in 1977 in Vienna, Austria, and saw the first participation of active NHL players, including team captain Phil Esposito, a two-time NHL MVP. Many of the players on the Canadian team were not prepared for the tournament and were unfamiliar with the gameplay at the international level. The team finished fourth. Hockey Canada is responsible for the Canadian team roster and operations.

Since 1977, Canada has participated in all 39 tournaments, sending 66 goaltenders and 492 skaters (forwards and defencemen). During this period, Canadian teams have won 18 medals: six gold medals, seven silver medals and five bronze medals. Thirty-one players have been inducted into the Hockey Hall of Fame and sixteen into Canada's Sports Hall of Fame. Wayne Gretzky and Mario Lemieux have also been inducted into the IIHF Hall of Fame and are the only players to have been inducted into all three. Dany Heatley and Shane Doan have each won five medals (two gold, three silver), more than any player since 1977. Eric Brewer has won the most gold medals, with three. Heatley, who has scored 38 goals and registered 62 points over six tournaments, is Canada's all-time goals and points leader at the tournament since 1977. Twenty-six players have served as team captain during this period. Ryan Smyth has played for eight teams and captained six (from 2001 to 2005, and in 2010), more than any other player since 1977 in both cases, and has been given the nickname "Captain Canada".

== Key ==
Abbreviations
GP	Games played
WCs	Number of World Championships
HHOF	Hockey Hall of Fame
IIHFHOF	IIHF Hall of Fame
CSHOF	Canada's Sports Hall of Fame

IIHF Directorate Awards
Best Goaltender	Awarded since 1954
Best Defenceman	Awarded since 1954
Best Forward	Awarded since 1954
Most Valuable Player	Awarded since 2004

Goaltenders
W	Wins	SO	Shutouts
L	Losses	GA	Goals against
T	Ties	GAA	Goals against average
MIN	Minutes played		

Skaters
P	Points	G	Goals
PIM	Penalty minutes	A	Assists

== Goaltenders ==
Player	WCs	Tournament(s)	GP	W	L	T	SO	Min	GA	GAA	Gold	Silver	Bronze	Total	Notes
Alex Auld	1	2006	5	2	3	0	0	274	13	2.85	0	0	0	0	
Jonathan Bernier	1	2011	3	2	1	0	0	179	6	2.01	0	0	0	0	
Craig Billington	1	1991	3	0	1	0	0	46	3	3.91	0	1 ('91)	0	1	
Martin Biron	1	2003	0	0	0	0	0	0	0	0	1 ('03)	0	0	1	
Daniel Bouchard	1	1978	6	1	4	0	0	344	24	4.19	0	0	1 ('78)	1	
Fred Brathwaite	3	1999, 2000, 2001	7	2	3	1	1	394	17	2.59	0	0	0	0	
Martin Brodeur	2	1996, 2005	10	5	3	1	0	558	28	3.01	0	2 ('96, '05)	0	2	
Christian Bronsard	1	1998	0	0	0	0	0	0	0	0	0	0	0	0	
Sean Burke	5	1987, 1989, 1991, 1997, 2003	35	21	6	6	4	1991	72	2.17	2 ('97, '03)	2 ('89, '91)	0	4	Best Goaltender (2003)
Dan Cloutier	1	2001	0	0	0	0	0	0	0	0	0	0	0	0	
Jacques Cloutier	1	1986	5	2	3	0	0	299	15	3.01	0	0	1 ('86)	1	
Marc Denis	3	2003, 2004, 2006	5	4	1	0	1	263	11	2.51	2 ('03, '04)	0	0	2	
Devan Dubnyk	4	2010, 2011, 2012, 2013	7	6	0	0	1	377	8	1.27	0	0	0	0	
Tony Esposito	1	1977	9	5	2	1	1	513	29	3.39	0	0	0	0	HHOF (1988); CSHOF (2005)
Bob Essensa	1	1990	4	1	1	0	0	101	5	2.97	0	0	0	0	
Éric Fichaud	1	1997	0	0	0	0	0	0	0	0	1 ('97)	0	0	1	
Stéphane Fiset	1	1994	2	2	0	0	0	120	3	1.50	1 ('94)	0	0	1	
Bob Froese	1	1987	5	1	3	1	1	300	18	3.60	0	0	0	0	
Grant Fuhr	1	1989	5	3	2	0	0	298	18	3.62	0	1 ('89)	0	1	HHOF (2003)
Mathieu Garon	1	2008	0	0	0	0	0	0	0	0	0	1 ('08)	0	1	
John Garrett	1	1981	3	1	1	0	0	120	8	4.00	0	0	0	0	
Jean-Sébastien Giguère	3	2001, 2002, 2004	7	5	1	0	2	373	6	0.96	1 ('04)	0	0	1	
Jeff Hackett	1	1999	2	0	1	1	0	120	9	4.50	0	0	0	0	
Matt Hackett	1	2012	0	0	0	0	0	0	0	0	0	0	0	0	
Josh Harding	1	2009	0	0	0	0	0	0	0	0	0	1 ('09)	0	1	
Denis Herron	1	1978	5	4	1	0	0	255	12	2.82	0	0	1 ('78)	1	
Ron Hextall	1	1992	5	1	3	1	0	273	13	2.86	0	0	0	0	
Corey Hirsch	1	1995	8	4	3	1	0	488	21	2.58	0	0	1 ('95)	1	
Kelly Hrudey	1	1986	5	2	3	0	0	299	22	4.41	0	0	1 ('86)	1	
Chad Johnson	1	2010	3	0	0	0	0	73	1	0.82	0	0	0	0	
Martin Jones	1	2015	2	2	0	0	1	120	3	1.50	1 ('15)	0	0	1	
Curtis Joseph	1	1996	6	4	2	0	1	349	12	2.06	0	1 ('96)	0	1	
Trevor Kidd	1	1992	1	1	0	0	0	60	3	3.00	0	0	0	0	
Pascal Leclaire	1	2008	4	4	0	0	1	240	8	2.00	0	1 ('08)	0	1	
Roberto Luongo	4	2001, 2003, 2004, 2005	15	12	1	2	3	856	29	2.03	2 ('03, '04)	1 ('05)	0	3	
Chris Mason	4	2006, 2007, 2009, 2010	11	7	4	0	1	583	20	2.06	1 ('07)	1 ('09)	0	2	
Kirk McLean	1	1990	10	5	2	1	0	458	27	3.54	0	0	0	0	
Gilles Meloche	1	1982	5	3	2	0	1	299	16	3.21	0	0	1 ('82)	1	
Greg Millen	1	1982	5	2	1	2	0	300	14	2.80	0	0	1 ('82)	1	
Phil Myre	1	1981	7	1	4	1	0	359	26	4.35	0	0	0	0	
Justin Peters	1	2014	0	0	0	0	0	0	0	0	0	0	0	0	
Justin Peters	1	2014	0	0	0	0	0	0	0	0	0	0	0	0	
Calvin Pickard	1	2016	2	2	0	0	1	120	1	0.50	1 ('16)	0	0	1	
Jamie Ram	2	2000, 2002	0	0	0	0	0	0	0	0	0	0	0	0	
Bill Ranford	2	1993, 1994	12	11	1	0	3	714	18	1.51	1 ('94)	0	0	1	Best Goaltender (1994)
James Reimer	2	2011, 2014	8	6	1	0	0	480	17	2.13	0	0	0	0	
Pat Riggin	1	1985	4	2	1	0	0	213	10	3.10	0	1 ('85)	0	1	
Dwayne Roloson	3	1995, 2007, 2009	9	7	2	0	0	544	21	2.32	1 ('07)	1 ('09)	1 ('95)	3	
Jim Rutherford	2	1977, 1979	8	4	3	0	0	407	30	4.42	0	0	0	0	
Ben Scrivens	1	2014	4	3	1	0	0	241	7	1.74	0	0	0	0	
Peter Sidorkiewicz	1	1989	1	0	0	0	0	25	0	0.00	0	1 ('89)	0	1	
Mike Smith	2	2013, 2015	12	10	2	0	3	735	19	1.55	1 ('15)	0	0	1	
Ed Staniowski	1	1979	3	0	3	0	0	160	19	7.13	0	0	0	0	
Jamie Storr	1	2002	0	0	0	0	0	0	0	0	0	0	0	0	
Rick Tabaracci	3	1992, 1997, 1999	8	2	2	0	0	294	15	3.06	1 ('97)	0	0	1	
Cam Talbot	1	2016	8	7	1	0	4	480	10	1.25	1 ('16)	0	0	1	
José Théodore	1	2000	8	5	3	0	2	478	13	1.63	0	0	0	0	
Ron Tugnutt	2	1993, 1999	9	5	2	0	0	443	17	2.30	0	0	0	0	
Marty Turco	2	2002, 2005	3	2	1	0	1	166	5	1.81	0	1 ('05)	0	1	
Andrew Verner	2	1995, 1996	0	0	0	0	0	0	0	0	0	1 ('96)	1 ('95)	2	
Mike Vernon	1	1991	2	0	1	0	0	73	6	4.91	0	1 ('91)	0	1	
Rick Wamsley	2	1983, 1985	12	7	5	0	1	720	41	3.42	0	1 ('85)	1 ('83)	2	
Cam Ward	3	2007, 2008, 2012	16	13	3	0	0	962	41	2.56	1 ('07)	1 ('08)	0	2	
Steve Weeks	1	1985	5	3	1	1	1	265	9	2.04	0	1 ('85)	0	1	
Ken Wregget	1	1990	1	0	0	0	0	40	0	0.00	0	0	0	0	

== Skaters ==
Player	WCs	Tournament(s)	GP	G	A	P	PIM	Gold	Silver	Bronze	Total	Notes
Keith Acton	3	1987, 1990, 1992	26	5	0	5	4	0	0	0	0	
Greg Adams	2	1986, 1990	11	9	2	11	10	0	0	1 ('86)	1	
Peter Allen	2	1995, 2000	9	0	0	0	4	0	0	1 ('95)	1	
Jan Alston	2	1995, 2003	0	0	0	0	0	1 ('03)	0	1 ('95)	2	
Glenn Anderson	2	1989, 1992	12	4	3	7	20	0	1 ('89)	0	1	Team Captain (1992); HHOF (2008)
John Anderson	2	1983, 1985	15	7	4	11	24	0	1 (‘85)	1 (‘83)	2	
Dave Andreychuk	1	1986	10	3	2	5	18	0	0	1 ('86)	1	
Greg Andrusak	1	1995	7	0	0	0	12	0	0	1 ('95)	1	
Dave Archibald	1	1991	10	0	1	1	8	0	1 (‘91)	0	1	
Colby Armstrong	2	2007, 2009	18	1	4	5	8	1 (‘07)	1 (‘09)	0	2	
Jason Arnott	1	1994	8	0	6	6	10	1 (‘94)	0	0	1	
Brent Ashton	1	1989	10	3	3	6	2	0	1 ('89)	0	1	
Adrian Aucoin	1	2000	9	3	3	6	14	0	0	0	0	
Dave Babych	2	1981, 1989	17	2	2	4	12	0	1 ('89)	0	1	
Wayne Babych	1	1979	7	1	2	3	0	0	0	0	0	
Bill Barber	1	1982	10	8	1	9	10	0	0	1 (‘82)	1	HHOF (1990)
Norm Barnes	1	1981	6	0	1	1	6	0	0	0	0	
Tyson Barrie	1	2015	10	1	5	6	0	1 (‘15)	0	0	1	
Bob Bassen	1	1992	3	1	1	2	0	0	0	0	0	
François Beauchemin	1	2010	7	0	1	1	0	0	0	0	0	
Brian Bellows	3	1987, 1989, 1990	28	12	15	27	18	0	1 ('89)	0	1	Best Forward (1989)
Jamie Benn	1	2012	8	3	2	5	4	0	0	0	0	
Brian Benning	1	1993	8	1	2	3	0	0	0	0	0	
Patrice Bergeron	2	2004, 2006	18	7	8	15	6	1 (‘04)	0	0	1	
Marc Bergevin	1	1994	8	0	0	0	2	1 (‘94)	0	0	1	
Todd Bertuzzi	2	1998, 2000	15	6	6	12	63	0	0	0	0	
Kevin Bieksa	1	2014	8	2	2	4	4	0	0	0	0	Team Captain (2014)
Rob Blake	5	1991, 1994, 1997, 1998, 1999	35	5	11	16	46	2 ('94, '97)	1 (‘91)	0	3	Best Defenceman (1997); Team Captain (1999); HHOF (2014)
Doug Bodger	3	1987, 1996, 1999	27	1	5	6	6	0	1 (‘96)	0	1	
Luciano Borsato	1	1995	8	3	1	4	18	0	0	1 ('95)	1	
Joel Bouchard	1	1997	11	0	1	1	2	1 (‘97)	0	0	1	
Rene Bourque	1	2010	7	1	1	2	14	0	0	0	0	
Pat Boutette	1	1981	8	1	1	2	16	0	0	0	0	
Jay Bouwmeester	4	2003, 2004, 2008, 2012	35	5	7	12	8	2 ('03, '04)	1 ('08)	0	3	Best Defenceman (2003)
Dan Boyle	1	2005	9	0	3	3	6	0	1 (‘05)	0	1	
Brad Boyes	1	2006	9	4	4	8	4	0	0	0	0	
Steve Bozek	1	1991	8	1	1	2	4	0	1 (‘91)	0	1	
Derick Brassard	1	2016	10	5	6	11	4	1 (‘16)	0	0	1	
Eric Brewer	5	2001, 2002, 2003, 2004, 2007	41	5	11	16	30	3 ('03, '04, '07)	0	0	3	
Daniel Briere	2	2003, 2004	18	6	11	17	12	2 ('03, '04)	0	0	2	
Chris Bright	1	1995	8	0	3	3	8	0	0	1 ('95)	1	
Rod Brind'Amour	3	1992, 1993, 1994	22	8	4	12	12	1 (‘94)	0	0	1	
T.J. Brodie	1	2013	7	0	1	1	0	0	0	0	0	
Troy Brouwer	1	2014	8	0	1	1	4	0	0	0	0	
Curtis Brown	1	2000	9	1	3	4	8	0	0	0	0	
Kelly Buchberger	3	1993, 1994, 1996	20	0	2	2	20	1 (‘94)	1 (‘96)	0	2	
Mike Bullard	1	1986	10	2	1	3	2	0	0	1 ('86)	1	
Alex Burrows	2	2012, 2014	11	3	1	4	6	0	0	0	0	
Brent Burns	4	2008, 2010, 2011, 2015	33	7	22	29	40	1 (‘15)	1 (‘08)	0	2	Best Defenceman (2008, 2015)
Shawn Burr	1	1990	10	4	1	5	14	0	0	0	0	
Garth Butcher	1	1992	3	1	0	1	4	0	0	0	0	
Kyle Calder	3	2002, 2003, 2006	21	4	3	7	10	1 (‘03)	0	0	1	
Michael Cammalleri	2	2006, 2007	17	5	7	12	10	1 (‘07)	0	0	1	
Brian Campbell	1	2013	8	0	2	2	0	0	0	0	0	
Terry Carkner	1	1993	8	0	0	0	0	0	0	0	0	
Randy Carlyle	1	1989	9	1	4	5	4	0	1 ('89)	0	1	
Anson Carter	2	1997, 2003	20	6	3	9	12	2 ('97, '03)	0	0	2	
Jeff Carter	1	2006	9	4	2	6	2	0	0	0	0	
Andrew Cassels	1	1996	6	1	0	1	0	0	1 (‘96)	0	1	
Cody Ceci	1	2016	10	1	5	6	0	1 (‘16)	0	0	1	
Guy Charron	3	1977, 1978, 1979	17	1	4	5	2	0	0	1 ('78)	1	Team Captain (1979)
Rich Chernomaz	1	1995	8	0	3	3	10	0	0	1 ('95)	1	
Steve Chiasson	1	1997	11	0	3	3	8	1 ('97)	0	0	1	
Jason Chimera	3	2007, 2008, 2014	26	2	9	11	14	1 ('07)	1 ('08)	0	2	
Dino Ciccarelli	2	1982, 1987	19	6	3	9	4	0	0	1 ('82)	1	HHOF (2010)
Bobby Clarke	1	1982	9	0	1	1	6	0	0	1 ('82)	1	Team Captain (1982); HHOF (1987); CSHOF (2005)
Daniel Cleary	1	2002	7	2	1	3	2	0	0	0	0	
Cal Clutterbuck	1	2011	7	0	1	1	4	0	0	0	0	
Braydon Coburn	2	2009, 2014	13	0	1	1	12	0	1 ('09)	0	1	
Paul Coffey	1	1990	10	1	6	7	10	0	0	0	0	HHOF (2004)
Carlo Colaiacovo	1	2011	5	0	0	0	0	0	0	0	0	
Mike Commodore	1	2007	9	0	2	2	14	1 ('07)	0	0	1	
Mike Comrie	3	2002, 2003, 2006	25	7	5	12	26	1 ('03)	0	0	1	
Brandon Convery	1	1995	8	0	1	1	0	0	0	1 ('95)	1	
Matt Cooke	1	2004	9	2	2	4	8	1 ('04)	0	0	1	
Shayne Corson	2	1993, 1994	15	6	7	13	10	1 ('94)	0	0	1	
Sylvain Côté	1	1992	0	0	0	0	0	0	0	0	0	
Geoff Courtnall	1	1991	10	5	1	6	16	0	1 ('91)	0	1	
Russ Courtnall	1	1991	2	1	3	4	0	0	1 ('91)	0	1	
Sean Couturier	1	2015	10	3	4	7	2	1 ('15)	0	0	1	
Murray Craven	2	1990, 1991	18	2	6	8	16	0	1 ('91)	0	1	
Sidney Crosby	2	2006, 2015	18	12	15	27	12	1 ('15)	0	0	1	Best Forward (2006); Team Captain (2015)
Cory Cross	3	1997, 1998, 2003	25	2	4	6	55	2 ('97, '03)	0	0	2	
John Cullen	1	1990	10	1	3	4	0	0	0	0	0	
Kyle Cumiskey	1	2010	7	0	3	3	0	0	0	0	0	
Trevor Daley	1	2006	7	0	1	1	10	0	0	0	0	
Mathieu Dandenault	1	2003	9	2	3	5	12	1 ('03)	0	0	1	
Ken Daneyko	2	1986, 1989	15	0	0	0	4	0	1 ('89)	1 ('86)	2	
Jason Dawe	1	1996	8	3	0	3	2	0	1 ('96)	0	1	
Éric Dazé	2	1998, 1999	8	1	5	6	0	0	0	0	0	
Lucien DeBlois	1	1981	8	3	0	3	4	0	0	0	0	
Michael Del Zotto	1	2010	5	0	0	0	0	0	0	0	0	
Marc Denis	1	1981	8	3	0	3	4	0	0	0	0	
Dale DeGray	1	1995	6	1	1	2	6	0	0	1 ('95)	1	
Brenden Dillon	1	2013	8	1	0	1	0	0	0	0	0	
Kevin Dineen	4	1985, 1987, 1989, 1993	37	11	13	24	50	0	2 ('85, '89)	0	2	
Marcel Dionne	4	1978, 1979, 1983, 1986	37	21	11	32	16	0	0	3 ('78, '83, '86)	3	Team Captain (1978, 1986); Best Forward (1978); HHOF (1992); CSHOF (1997)
Shane Doan	6	1999, 2003, 2005, 2007, 2008, 2009	48	13	20	33	42	2 ('03, '07)	3 ('05, '08, '09)	0	5	Team Captain (2007–2009)
Bobby Dollas	1	1994	8	0	1	1	4	1 ('94)	0	0	1	
Max Domi	1	2016	10	1	0	1	4	1 (‘16)	0	0	1	
Shean Donovan	1	1997	10	0	1	1	31	1 ('97)	0	0	1	
Drew Doughty	1	2009	9	1	6	7	4	0	1 ('09)	0	1	
Steve Downie	1	2010	7	2	0	2	28	0	0	0	0	
Kris Draper	4	2000, 2001, 2003, 2005	28	2	7	9	16	1 ('03)	1 ('05)	0	2	
Bruce Driver	1	1987	8	0	0	0	4	0	0	0	0	
Matt Duchene	5	2010, 2011, 2013, 2015, 2016	42	17	17	34	6	2 ('15, '16)	0	0	2	
Steve Duchesne	2	1994, 1996	14	1	3	4	4	1 ('94)	1 ('96)	0	2	
Mathew Dumba	1	2016	10	1	1	2	2	1 (‘16)	0	0	1	
Jean-Pierre Dumont	1	2004	9	0	1	1	0	1 ('04)	0	0	1	
Micki DuPont	1	2006	9	0	1	1	4	0	0	0	0	
Cody Eakin	1	2015	9	4	2	6	0	1 ('15)	0	0	1	
Jordan Eberle	4	2010, 2011, 2012, 2015	29	14	15	29	2	1 ('15)	0	0	1	
Aaron Ekblad	1	2015	10	4	3	7	6	1 ('15)	0	0	1	
Mickey Elick	1	1998	6	0	0	0	4	0	0	0	0	
David Ellett	1	1989	10	4	2	6	14	0	1 ('89)	0	1	
Ron Ellis	1	1977	10	5	4	9	2	0	0	0	0	CSHOF (2005)
Ryan Ellis	2	2014, 2016	13	2	5	7	0	1 (‘16)	0	0	1	
Nelson Emerson	3	1992, 1994, 1998	17	4	4	8	8	1 ('94)	0	0	1	
Brian Engblom	1	1983	10	1	2	3	0	0	0	1 ('83)	1	
Tyler Ennis	1	2015	10	4	2	6	0	1 ('15)	0	0	1	
Bob Errey	1	1997	11	2	1	3	6	1 ('97)	0	0	1	
Len Esau	1	1995	7	0	1	1	2	0	0	1 ('95)	1	
Phil Esposito	1	1977	10	7	3	10	14	0	0	0	0	Team Captain (1977); HHOF (1984); CSHOF (1989)
Dean Evason	1	1997	11	2	3	5	20	1 ('97)	0	0	1	Team Captain (1997)
Pat Falloon	1	1992	6	2	1	3	2	0	0	0	0	
Brad Ference	1	2002	6	0	0	0	4	0	0	0	0	
Ray Ferraro	3	1989, 1992, 1996	23	3	10	13	16	0	2 ('89, '96)	0	2	
Jeff Finley	1	2000	7	1	1	2	0	0	0	0	0	
Mike Fisher	2	2005, 2009	18	2	4	6	18	0	2 ('05, '09)	0	2	
Patrick Flatley	1	1983	6	0	0	0	2	0	0	1 ('83)	1	
Theoren Fleury	2	1990, 1991	17	9	12	21	18	0	1 ('91)	0	1	
Mike Foligno	3	1981, 1986, 1987	27	2	9	11	60	0	0	1 ('86)	1	Team Captain (1987)
Jim Fox	1	1986	10	2	1	3	2	0	0	1 ('86)	1	
Ron Francis	1	1985	10	2	5	7	2	0	1 ('85)	0	1	HHOF (2007)
Iain Fraser	1	1995	8	2	7	9	8	0	0	1 ('95)	1	
Mark Freer	1	1995	6	1	0	1	2	0	0	1 ('95)	1	
Jeff Friesen	5	1996, 1997, 1999, 2001, 2004	41	8	11	19	30	2 ('97, '04)	1 ('96)	0	3	
Simon Gagne	1	2005	9	3	7	10	0	0	1 ('05)	0	1	
Dave Gagner	1	1993	8	3	1	4	6	0	0	0	0	
Sam Gagner	1	2008	1	0	0	0	0	0	1 ('08)	0	1	
Bob Gainey	2	1982, 1983	20	2	7	9	2	0	0	2 ('82, '83)	2	HHOF (1992); CSHOF (1995)
Brendan Gallagher	1	2016	10	2	3	5	12	1 (‘16)	0	0	1	
Gerard Gallant	1	1989	8	2	3	5	10	0	1 ('89)	0	1	
Garry Galley	2	1993, 1996	16	1	4	5	6	0	1 ('96)	0	1	
Jason Garrison	1	2014	7	0	4	4	6	0	0	0	0	
Mike Gartner	4	1981, 1982, 1983, 1993	36	14	7	21	38	0	0	2 ('82, '83)	2	HHOF (2001)
Martin Gélinas	1	1998	6	1	0	1	6	0	0	0	0	
Ryan Getzlaf	2	2008, 2012	17	5	18	23	37	0	1 ('08)	0	1	Team Captain (2012)
Rod Gilbert	1	1977	10	2	2	4	12	0	0	0	0	HHOF (1982); CSHOF (2005)
Curt Giles	1	1982	10	0	1	1	12	0	0	1 ('82)	1	
Todd Gill	1	1992	6	0	3	3	6	0	0	0	0	
Doug Gilmour	1	1990	9	2	4	6	18	0	0	0	0	HHOF (2011)
Mark Giordano	2	2008, 2010	7	1	3	4	10	0	1 ('08)	0	1	
Claude Giroux	2	2013, 2015	18	6	12	18	16	1 ('15)	0	0	1	
Michel Goulet	1	1983	10	1	8	9	6	0	0	1 ('83)	1	HHOF (1998)
Chris Govedaris	1	1995	8	1	0	1	6	0	0	1 ('95)	1	
Marc-Andre Gragnani	1	2011	6	1	1	2	2	0	0	0	0	
Dirk Graham	1	1987	9	0	3	3	8	0	0	0	0	
Chris Gratton	2	1997, 1998	15	1	5	6	18	1 ('97)	0	0	1	
Adam Graves	2	1993, 1999	17	8	5	13	16	0	0	0	0	Team Captain (1993)
Mike Green	1	2008	9	4	8	12	2	0	1 ('08)	0	1	
Rick Green	4	1979, 1981, 1982, 1990	34	2	7	9	8	0	0	1 ('82)	1	
Travis Green	3	1996, 1997, 1998	25	8	12	20	22	1 ('97)	1 ('96)	0	2	
Wayne Gretzky	1	1982	10	6	8	14	0	0	0	1 ('82)	1	HHOF (1999); IIHFHOF (2000); CSHOF (2000)
Erik Gudbranson	1	2014	8	1	0	1	6	0	0	0	0	
Marc Habscheid	1	1992	6	0	0	0	4	0	0	0	0	
Taylor Hall	3	2013, 2015, 2016	28	15	9	24	8	2 ('15, '16)	0	0	2	
Doug Halward	2	1983, 1985	20	2	4	6	10	0	1 ('85)	1 ('83)	2	
Rick Hampton	2	1977, 1978	20	1	2	3	13	0	0	1 ('78)	1	
Dan Hamhuis	6	2006, 2007, 2008, 2009, 2013, 2015	49	5	16	21	46	2 ('07, '15)	2 ('08, '09)	0	4	
Scott Hannan	1	2005	9	0	0	0	8	0	1 ('05)	0	1	
Mark Hardy	1	1986	10	3	2	5	12	0	0	1 ('86)	1	
Jay Harrison	1	2013	8	0	1	1	2	0	0	0	0	
Scott Hartnell	1	2006	9	1	0	1	4	0	0	0	0	
Craig Hartsburg	3	1982, 1983, 1987	25	4	6	10	28	0	0	2 ('82, '83)	2	Best Defenceman (1987)
Dale Hawerchuk	3	1982, 1986, 1989	28	9	13	22	10	0	1 ('89)	2 ('82, '86)	3	HHOF (2001)
Dany Heatley	6	2002, 2003, 2004, 2005, 2008, 2009	52	38	24	62	44	2 ('03, '04)	3 ('05, '08, '09)	0	5	Best Forward (2004, 2008); MVP (2004, 2008)
Jamie Heward	4	1995, 2003, 2004, 2005	17	0	5	5	8	2 ('03, '04)	1 ('05)	1 ('95)	4	
Pat Hickey	1	1978	10	5	1	6	4	0	0	1 ('78)	1	
Todd Hlushko	1	1995	8	4	0	4	4	0	0	1 ('95)	1	
Cody Hodgson	1	2014	8	6	2	8	4	0	0	0	0	
Shawn Horcoff	3	2003, 2004, 2009	27	7	9	16	14	2 ('03, '04)	1 ('09)	0	3	
Willie Huber	1	1981	7	0	2	2	10	0	0	0	0	
Jonathan Huberdeau	1	2014	8	1	4	5	2	0	0	0	0	
Kerry Huffman	1	1992	6	1	0	1	2	0	0	0	0	
Ben Hutton	1	2016	5	0	1	1	0	1 (‘16)	0	0	1	
Jarome Iginla	1	1997	11	2	3	5	2	1 ('97)	0	0	1	
Ralph Intranuovo	1	1995	8	5	1	6	6	0	0	1 ('95)	1	
Brad Isbister	2	2000, 2001	16	9	3	12	34	0	0	0	0	
Barret Jackman	1	2007	9	0	2	2	6	1 ('07)	0	0	1	
Boone Jenner	1	2016	10	2	2	4	4	1 (‘16)	0	0	1	
Trevor Johansen	1	1979	8	2	1	3	4	0	0	0	0	
Greg Johnson	1	1993	8	1	2	3	2	0	0	0	0	
Mike Johnson	1	2000	9	1	1	2	10	0	0	0	0	
Jean-François Jomphe	2	1995, 1996	16	4	1	5	10	0	1 ('96)	1 ('95)	2	
Ed Jovanovski	4	1998, 2000, 2005, 2008	33	4	5	9	26	0	2 ('05, '08)	0	2	
Nazem Kadri	1	2014	8	0	3	3	4	0	0	0	0	
Evander Kane	3	2010, 2011, 2012	22	6	7	13	12	0	0	0	0	
Paul Kariya	3	1993, 1994, 1996	24	11	17	28	4	1 ('94)	1 ('96)	0	2	Best Forward (1994)
Dennis Kearns	2	1977, 1978	20	0	2	2	16	0	0	1 ('78)	1	
Duncan Keith	2	2008, 2012	17	1	12	13	6	0	1 ('08)	0	1	
Derek King	1	1992	6	1	0	1	6	0	0	0	0	
Ralph Klassen	1	1977	10	1	5	6	0	0	0	0	0	
Krys Kolanos	1	2003	9	0	1	1	6	1 ('03)	0	0	1	
Steve Konroyd	2	1985, 1991	20	1	6	7	0	0	2 ('85, '91)	0	2	
Chris Kunitz	1	2008	9	2	5	7	4	0	1 ('08)	0	1	
Joel Kwiatkowski	1	2009	5	0	0	0	2	0	1 ('09)	0	1	
Andrew Ladd	3	2011, 2012, 2013	23	4	7	11	8	0	0	0	0	
Guy Lafleur	1	1981	7	1	0	1	2	0	0	0	0	HHOF (1988); CSHOF (1996)
Brooks Laich	1	2010	7	1	0	1	0	0	0	0	0	
Rick Lanz	1	1983	6	0	2	2	2	0	0	1 ('83)	1	
Claude Lapointe	1	1999	9	1	3	4	10	0	0	0	0	
Martin Lapointe	1	2000	3	0	0	0	4	0	0	0	0	
Steve Larmer	1	1991	10	5	3	8	4	0	1 ('91)	0	1	
Pierre Larouche	1	1977	10	7	8	15	16	0	0	0	0	
Vincent Lecavalier	1	2001	7	3	2	5	29	0	0	0	0	
Grant Ledyard	2	1985, 1986	13	0	3	3	10	0	1 ('85)	1 ('86)	2	
Mario Lemieux	1	1985	9	4	6	10	2	0	1 ('85)	0	1	HHOF (1997); CSHOF (1998); IIHFHOF (2008)
Curtis Leschyshyn	1	1990	9	0	0	0	4	0	0	0	0	
Trevor Letowski	1	2000	9	0	2	2	6	0	0	0	0	
Don Lever	1	1978	10	4	3	7	4	0	0	1 ('78)	1	
Nick Libett	1	1979	8	1	0	1	4	0	0	0	0	
Doug Lidster	3	1985, 1990, 1991	30	5	5	10	18	0	2 ('85, '91)	0	2	Team Captain (1991)
Chris Lindberg	1	1992	5	1	0	1	8	0	0	0	0	
Trevor Linden	2	1991, 1998	16	2	8	10	8	0	1 ('91)	0	1	
Eric Lindros	1	1993	8	11	6	17	10	0	0	0	0	Best Forward (1993)
Matthew Lombardi	2	2007, 2009	18	8	8	16	10	1 ('07)	1 ('09)	0	2	
Barry Long	1	1981	7	1	0	1	8	0	0	0	0	
Kevin Lowe	1	1982	9	1	1	2	2	0	0	1 ('82)	1	
Morris Lukowich	1	1981	8	2	1	3	4	0	0	0	0	
Tom Lysiak	1	1978	7	1	1	2	4	0	0	1 ('78)	1	
Al MacAdam	2	1977, 1979	18	8	8	16	0	0	0	0	0	
Al MacInnis	1	1990	9	1	3	4	10	0	0	0	0	HHOF (2007)
Norm Maciver	1	1993	8	0	5	5	4	0	0	0	0	
Nathan MacKinnon	2	2014, 2015	18	5	8	13	14	1 ('15)	0	0	1	
John MacLean	1	1989	10	3	6	9	4	0	1 ('89)	0	1	
Brian MacLellan	1	1985	4	0	0	0	0	0	1 ('85)	0	1	
Bob MacMillan	1	1978	10	0	3	3	6	0	0	1 ('78)	1	
Jamie Macoun	3	1985, 1990, 1991	25	5	2	7	26	0	2 ('85, '91)	0	2	Best Defenceman (1991)
Manny Malhotra	1	2002	7	0	0	0	4	0	0	0	0	
Don Maloney	1	1985	8	1	1	2	2	0	1 ('85)	0	1	
Kirk Maltby	2	2003, 2005	18	3	3	6	16	1 ('03)	1 ('05)	0	2	
Mike Maneluk	1	1995	8	0	2	2	0	0	0	1 ('95)	1	
Dave Manson	1	1993	8	3	7	10	22	0	0	0	0	
Brad Marchand	1	2016	10	4	3	7	10	1 (‘16)	0	0	1	
Patrick Marleau	4	1999, 2001, 2003, 2005	31	5	11	16	12	1 ('03)	1 ('05)	0	2	
Daniel Marois	1	2001	1	0	1	1	0	0	0	0	0	
Mario Marois	1	1989	10	0	4	4	6	0	1 ('89)	0	1	
Brad Marsh	1	1979	6	1	0	1	4	0	0	0	0	
Dennis Maruk	4	1978, 1979, 1981, 1983	35	16	8	24	14	0	0	2 ('78, '83)	2	
Mike Matheson	1	2016	10	2	4	6	0	1 (‘16)	0	0	1	Best Defenceman (2016)
David Matsos	1	1996	8	0	0	0	4	0	1 ('96)	0	1	
Richard Matvichuk	1	2002	7	1	0	1	6	0	0	0	0	
Brad Maxwell	3	1978, 1979, 1982	22	3	1	4	30	0	0	2 ('78, '82)	2	
Brad May	1	1996	8	0	0	0	4	0	1 ('96)	0	1	
Derek Mayer	2	1993, 1996	16	1	1	2	4	0	1 ('96)	0	1	
Jamal Mayers	3	2000, 2007, 2008	25	4	7	11	12	1 ('07)	1 ('08)	0	2	
Dean McAmmond	2	1996, 2000	16	0	2	2	2	0	1 ('96)	0	1	
Andrew McBain	1	1989	10	6	2	8	8	0	1 ('89)	0	1	
Bryan McCabe	3	1997, 1998, 1999	26	2	7	9	24	1 ('97)	0	0	1	
Dale McCourt	2	1979, 1981	11	1	1	2	8	0	0	0	0	
Connor McDavid	1	2016	10	1	8	9	6	1 (‘16)	0	0	1	
Andy McDonald	1	2002	7	4	1	5	0	0	0	0	0	
Lanny McDonald	1	1981	8	3	0	3	4	0	0	0	0	Team Captain (1981); HHOF (1992)
Dan McGillis	1	2002	5	0	1	1	2	0	0	0	0	
Walt McKechnie	1	1977	10	1	6	7	8	0	0	0	0	
Andrew McKim	1	1995	8	6	7	13	4	0	0	1 ('95)	1	
Jay McClement	1	2007	9	2	2	4	4	1 ('07)	0	0	1	
Kyle McLaren	1	2001	7	0	2	2	2	0	0	0	0	
Glen Metropolit	1	2006	9	0	2	2	6	0	0	0	0	
Wayne Merrick	1	1977	10	4	3	7	10	0	0	0	0	
Mark Messier	1	1989	6	3	3	6	8	0	1 ('89)	0	1	HHOF (2007); CSHOF (2009)
Marc Methot	2	2011, 2012	13	0	2	2	27	0	0	0	0	
Willie Mitchell	1	2004	6	3	3	6	8	1 ('04)	0	0	1	
Sean Monahan	1	2014	8	0	2	2	2	0	0	0	0	
Derek Morris	3	1999, 2001, 2004	25	1	10	11	49	1 ('04)	0	0	1	
Brendan Morrison	3	1999, 2004, 2005	25	6	9	15	18	1 ('04)	1 ('05)	0	2	
Brenden Morrow	4	2001, 2002, 2004, 2005	26	0	5	5	20	1 ('04)	1 ('05)	0	2	
Kirk Muller	5	1985, 1986, 1987, 1989, 2001	37	14	9	23	40	0	2 ('85, '89)	1 ('86)	3	
Cory Murphy	1	2007	9	1	6	7	8	1 ('07)	0	0	1	
Gord Murphy	1	1998	6	1	0	1	2	0	0	0	0	
Larry Murphy	3	1985, 1987, 2000	17	2	9	11	8	0	1 ('85)	0	1	HHOF (2004)
Mike Murphy	1	1978	10	1	4	5	16	0	0	1 ('78)	1	
Glen Murray	2	1998, 2004	14	3	4	7	8	1 ('04)	0	0	1	
Rem Murray	1	2001	7	1	3	4	2	0	0	0	0	
Ryan Murray	2	2012, 2016	16	0	5	5	0	1 (‘16)	0	0	1	
Troy Murray	1	1987	10	2	2	4	14	0	0	0	0	
Jake Muzzin	1	2015	10	0	8	8	4	1 ('15)	0	0	1	
Tyler Myers	2	2010, 2014	15	0	4	4	10	0	0	0	0	
Mark Napier	1	1982	9	3	1	4	0	0	0	1 ('82)	1	
Rick Nash	4	2005, 2007, 2008, 2011	34	23	21	44	20	1 ('07)	2 ('05, '08)	0	3	Team Captain (2011); MVP (2007)
Ric Nattress	1	1991	7	0	1	1	4	0	1 ('91)	0	1	
James Neal	2	2009, 2011	9	3	5	8	12	0	1 ('09)	0	1	
Bernie Nicholls	1	1985	10	0	2	2	12	0	1 ('85)	0	1	
Rob Niedermayer	2	1999, 2004	18	4	5	9	30	1 ('04)	0	0	1	
Scott Niedermayer	1	2004	9	3	2	5	12	1 ('04)	0	0	1	CSHOF (2012); HHOF (2013)
Joe Nieuwendyk	1	1990	1	0	0	0	0	0	0	0	0	HHOF (2011)
Owen Nolan	1	1997	10	4	3	7	31	1 ('97)	0	0	1	
Ryan Nugent-Hopkins	1	2012	8	4	2	6	4	0	0	0	0	
Sean O'Donnell	1	1999	8	1	2	3	6	0	0	0	0	
Ryan O'Reilly	4	2012, 2013, 2015, 2016	35	7	19	26	6	2 ('15, '16)	0	0	2	
John Ogrodnick	1	1981	8	3	2	5	0	0	0	0	0	
Steve Ott	1	2010	7	0	1	1	20	0	0	0	0	
Wilf Paiement	3	1977, 1978, 1979	28	14	9	23	46	0	0	1 ('78)	1	Best Forward (1979)
James Patrick	5	1983, 1987, 1989, 1998, 2002	40	3	7	10	20	0	1 ('89)	1 ('83)	2	
Steve Payne	1	1979	7	2	0	2	2	0	0	0	0	
Michael Peca	1	2001	3	1	3	4	0	0	0	0	0	Team Captain (2001)
Barry Pederson	1	1987	10	2	3	5	2	0	0	0	0	
Rich Peverley	1	2010	7	1	3	4	4	0	0	0	0	
Yanic Perreault	1	1996	8	6	3	9	0	0	1 ('96)	0	1	Best Forward (1996)
Corey Perry	3	2010, 2012, 2016	25	9	13	22	22	1 (‘16)	0	0	1	Team Captain (2016)
Michel Petit	1	1990	8	0	1	1	8	0	0	0	0	
Matt Pettinger	1	2006	8	1	0	1	4	0	0	0	0	
Dion Phaneuf	2	2007, 2011, 2012	22	2	11	13	14	1 ('07)	0	0	1	
Chris Phillips	3	2000, 2005, 2009	27	0	4	4	22	0	2 ('05, '09)	0	2	
Robert Picard	2	1978, 1979	17	1	2	3	6	0	0	1 ('78)	1	
Alex Pietrangelo	1	2011	7	2	3	5	2	0	0	0	0	Best Defenceman (2011)
Denis Potvin	1	1986	7	1	4	5	6	0	0	1 ('86)	1	HHOF (1991); CSHOF (2001)
Keith Primeau	2	1997, 1998	17	6	4	10	18	1 ('97)	0	0	1	Team Captain (1998)
Chris Pronger	1	1997	9	0	2	2	12	1 ('97)	0	0	1	HHOF (2015)
Jean Pronovost	2	1977, 1978	17	4	5	9	0	0	0	1 ('78)	1	
Brian Propp	2	1982, 1983	20	7	5	12	10	0	0	2 ('82, '83)	2	
Teddy Purcell	1	2012	8	1	1	2	0	0	0	0	0	
Kyle Quincey	1	2012	6	0	0	0	4	0	0	0	0	
Dan Quinn	1	1987	10	2	2	4	12	0	0	0	0	
Stéphane Quintal	1	1999	9	3	2	5	4	0	0	0	0	
Yves Racine	2	1991, 1994	12	1	2	3	8	1 ('94)	1 ('91)	0	2	
Rob Ramage	1	1981	8	0	1	1	0	0	0	0	0	
Mason Raymond	1	2010	3	0	1	1	0	0	0	0	0	
Matt Read	2	2013, 2014	16	3	5	8	4	0	0	0	0	
Mark Recchi	3	1990, 1993, 1997	22	5	10	15	4	1 ('97)	0	0	1	
Wade Redden	3	1999, 2001, 2005	25	3	8	11	33	0	1 ('05)	0	1	Best Defenceman (2005)
Craig Redmond	1	1986	10	3	2	5	14	0	0	1 ('86)	1	
Robyn Regehr	2	2000, 2005	15	0	0	0	6	0	1 ('05)	0	1	
Paul Reinhart	2	1982, 1983	13	3	8	11	6	0	0	2 ('82, '83)	2	
Sam Reinhart	1	2016	10	0	4	4	0	1 (‘16)	0	0	1	
Steven Reinprecht	1	2003	8	0	6	6	2	1 ('03)	0	0	1	
Pat Ribble	1	1978	10	0	0	0	15	0	0	1 ('78)	1	
Mike Ricci	1	1994	8	2	1	3	8	1 ('94)	0	0	1	
Brad Richards	1	2001	7	3	3	6	0	0	0	0	0	
Mike Richards	1	2006	9	3	2	5	10	0	0	0	0	
Luke Richardson	2	1994, 1996	16	0	1	1	18	1 ('94)	1 ('96)	0	2	
Morgan Rielly	2	2014, 2016	18	2	4	6	2	1 (‘16)	0	0	1	
Craig Rivet	1	2003	9	0	1	1	6	1 ('03)	0	0	1	
Stephane Robidas	3	2001, 2006, 2013	24	1	5	6	12	0	0	0	0	
Larry Robinson	1	1981	6	1	1	2	2	0	0	0	0	Best Defenceman (1981); HHOF (1995); CSHOF (2004)
Luc Robitaille	1	1994	8	3	4	7	2	1 ('94)	0	0	1	Team Captain (1994); HHOF (2009)
Stacy Roest	1	2006	0	0	0	0	0	0	0	0	0	
Mike Rogers	1	1981	6	0	1	1	4	0	0	0	0	
Cliff Ronning	1	1991	10	1	4	5	8	0	1 ('91)	0	1	
Bob Rouse	1	1987	4	0	0	0	4	0	0	0	0	
Derek Roy	2	2008, 2009	18	9	9	18	10	0	2 ('08, '09)	0	2	
Steve Rucchin	1	1998	6	1	2	3	2	0	0	0	0	
Kris Russell	2	2010, 2012	11	1	6	7	4	0	0	0	0	
Phil Russell	2	1977, 1986	18	0	4	4	26	0	0	1 ('86)	1	
Joe Sakic	2	1991, 1994	18	10	8	18	0	1 ('94)	1 ('91)	0	2	HHOF (2012); CSHOF (2013)
Geoff Sanderson	3	1993, 1994, 1997	27	10	7	17	12	2 ('94, '97)	0	0	2	
Brian Savage	2	1993, 1999	15	4	3	7	4	0	0	0	0	
David Savard	1	2015	10	0	4	4	6	1 ('15)	0	0	1	
Mario Scalzo	1	2011	3	0	2	2	0	0	0	0	0	
Peter Schaefer	2	2000, 2002	15	1	1	2	6	0	0	0	0	
Mark Scheifele	2	2014, 2016	17	6	7	13	8	1 (‘16)	0	0	1	
Brayden Schenn	2	2014, 2015	10	4	1	5	0	1 ('15)	0	0	1	
Luke Schenn	4	2009, 2011, 2012, 2013	31	1	4	5	52	0	1 ('09)	0	1	
Brad Schlegel	4	1991, 1992, 1995, 2002	28	1	4	5	24	0	1 ('91)	1 ('95)	2	
Justin Schultz	1	2013	8	0	4	4	2	0	0	0	0	
Nick Schultz	3	2004, 2006, 2007	27	0	3	3	8	2 ('04, '07)	0	0	2	
Jaden Schwartz	1	2013	0	0	0	0	0	0	0	0	0	
Brent Seabrook	1	2006	8	0	0	0	2	0	0	0	0	
Al Secord	1	1987	10	0	2	2	16	0	0	0	0	
Tyler Seguin	1	2015	10	9	1	10	4	1 ('15)	0	0	1	
Brendan Shanahan	2	1994, 2006	14	7	4	11	16	1 ('94)	0	0	1	Team Captain (2006); HHOF (2013)
Dave Shand	2	1978, 1979	17	0	3	3	14	0	0	1 ('78)	1	
Jeff Shantz	1	2004	0	0	0	0	0	1 ('04)	0	0	1	
Patrick Sharp	2	2008, 2012	17	4	7	11	6	0	1 ('08)	0	1	
Glen Sharpley	1	1978	10	1	3	4	16	0	0	1 ('78)	1	
Gord Sherven	1	1983	9	2	1	3	2	0	0	1 ('83)	1	
Mike Sillinger	1	2000	9	3	0	3	4	0	0	0	0	Team Captain (2000)
Charlie Simmer	1	1983	10	2	3	5	8	0	0	1 ('83)	1	
Wayne Simmonds	1	2013	8	1	0	1	2	0	0	0	0	
Darryl Sittler	2	1982, 1983	20	7	4	11	14	0	0	2 ('82, '83)	2	Team Captain (1983); HHOF (1989)
Jeff Skinner	3	2011, 2012, 2013	23	8	7	15	14	0	0	0	0	
Bobby Smith	2	1979, 1982	18	6	8	14	0	0	0	1 ('82)	1	
Dallas Smith	1	1977	10	0	2	2	4	0	0	0	0	
Geoff Smith	1	1993	8	0	0	0	4	0	0	0	0	
Greg Smith	2	1977, 1979	15	0	2	2	16	0	0	0	0	
Jason Smith	1	2001	7	1	0	1	4	0	0	0	0	
Randy Smith	2	1991, 1992	16	1	0	1	12	0	1 ('91)	0	1	
Stan Smyl	1	1985	10	1	1	2	6	0	1 ('85)	0	1	
Ryan Smyth	8	1999, 2000, 2001, 2002, 2003, 2004, 2005, 2010	60	15	16	31	26	2 ('03, '04)	1 ('05)	0	3	Team Captain (2001–2005, 2010)
Sheldon Souray	1	2005	9	1	1	2	6	0	1 ('05)	0	1	
Jason Spezza	4	2008, 2009, 2011, 2015	35	18	17	35	8	1 ('15)	2 ('08, '09)	0	3	Best Forward (2015)
Martin St. Louis	2	2008, 2009	18	6	19	25	2	0	2 ('08, '09)	0	2	
Eric Staal	3	2007, 2008, 2013	25	9	11	20	16	1 ('07)	1 ('08)	0	2	Team Captain (2013)
Jordan Staal	2	2007, 2013	17	1	4	5	4	1 ('07)	0	0	1	
Marc Staal	1	2010	7	0	1	1	2	0	0	0	0	
Steve Staios	4	2002, 2003, 2004, 2008	33	2	4	6	18	2 ('03, '04)	1 ('08)	0	3	
Steve Stamkos	3	2009, 2010, 2013	22	16	10	26	22	0	1 ('09)	0	1	
Scott Stevens	4	1983, 1985, 1987, 1989	27	3	6	9	18	0	2 ('85, '89)	1 ('83)	3	HHOF (2007)
Chris Stewart	1	2011	7	2	2	4	0	0	0	0	0	
Cory Stillman	1	1999	9	4	4	8	4	0	0	0	0	
Mark Stone	1	2016	10	4	6	10	6	1 (‘16)	0	0	1	
Brad Stuart	2	2001, 2006	16	1	4	5	20	0	0	0	0	
P. K. Subban	1	2013	1	0	0	0	0	0	0	0	0	
Steve Sullivan	2	2000, 2001	15	5	3	8	24	0	0	0	0	
Brent Sutter	1	1986	8	4	7	11	8	0	0	1 ('86)	1	
Ron Sutter	1	1990	10	1	1	2	4	0	0	0	0	
Don Sweeney	1	1997	11	1	3	4	6	1 ('97)	0	0	1	
Darryl Sydor	3	1994, 1996, 2002	17	0	3	3	4	1 ('94)	1 ('96)	0	2	
Phil Sykes	1	1986	9	0	0	0	2	0	0	1 ('86)	1	
Chris Szysky	1	1999	6	0	0	0	4	0	0	0	0	
Steve Tambellini	1	1981	8	0	3	3	4	0	0	0	0	
Chris Tanev	1	2016	10	0	1	1	0	1 (‘16)	0	0	1	
Tony Tanti	3	1985, 1986, 1987	28	16	7	23	40	0	1 ('85)	1 ('86)	2	
John Tavares	3	2010, 2011, 2012	22	16	9	25	30	0	0	0	0	
Dave Taylor	3	1983, 1985, 1986	30	7	10	17	20	0	1 ('85)	2 ('83, '86)	3	Team Captain (1985)
Steve Thomas	4	1991, 1992, 1994, 1996	29	10	13	23	45	1 ('94)	2 ('91, '96)	0	3	Team Captain (1996)
Joe Thornton	2	2001, 2005	15	7	11	18	10	0	1 ('05)	0	1	MVP (2005)
Scott Thornton	1	1999	9	5	1	6	6	0	0	0	0	
Tom Tilley	1	1995	8	0	0	0	14	0	0	1 ('95)	1	
Rick Tocchet	1	1990	10	4	2	6	14	0	0	0	0	
Jonathan Toews	2	2007, 2008	18	4	8	12	14	1 ('07)	1 ('08)	0	2	
Tyler Toffoli	1	2015	10	2	3	5	2	1 ('15)	0	0	1	
Patrick Traverse	1	2000	8	1	0	1	0	0	0	0	0	
Yannick Tremblay	1	2000	9	1	1	2	0	0	0	0	0	
Kyle Turris	1	2014	8	3	3	6	2	0	0	0	0	
Brian Tutt	2	1992, 1995	12	0	0	0	14	0	0	1 ('95)	1	Team Captain (1995)
Garry Unger	2	1978, 1979	18	2	1	3	42	0	0	1 ('78)	1	
Scottie Upshall	1	2009	8	0	1	1	27	0	1 ('09)	0	1	
Carol Vadnais	1	1977	10	3	1	4	33	0	0	0	0	
Eric Vail	1	1977	9	4	1	5	18	0	0	0	0	
Rick Vaive	2	1982, 1985	19	9	4	13	30	0	1 ('85)	1 ('82)	2	
John Van Boxmeer	1	1982	8	2	0	2	8	0	0	1 ('82)	1	
Mike Veisor	1	1983	10	0	0	0	0	0	0	1 ('83)	1	
Pat Verbeek	2	1989, 1994	12	1	3	4	6	1 ('94)	1 ('89)	0	2	
Antoine Vermette	1	2011	4	0	0	0	0	0	0	0	0	
Marc-Édouard Vlasic	2	2009, 2012	7	0	0	0	4	0	1 ('09)	0	1	
Scott Walker	3	1999, 2001, 2005	25	5	6	11	28	0	1 ('05)	0	1	
Ryan Walter	3	1979, 1981, 1982	20	5	5	10	6	0	0	1 ('82)	1	
Wes Walz	1	2001	6	0	4	4	2	0	0	0	0	
Joel Ward	1	2014	8	6	3	9	4	0	0	0	0	
Tim Watters	1	1983	10	0	0	0	8	0	0	1 ('83)	1	
Shea Weber	2	2007, 2009	15	5	9	14	37	1 ('07)	1 ('09)	0	2	Best Defenceman (2009)
Jay Wells	1	1986	10	0	2	2	16	0	0	1 ('86)	1	
Glen Wesley	1	1996	8	0	1	1	4	0	1 ('96)	0	1	
Ian White	1	2009	5	1	2	3	0	0	1 ('09)	0	1	
Ray Whitney	4	1998, 1999, 2001, 2010	29	8	17	25	26	0	0	0	0	Team Captain (2010)
Patrick Wiercioch	1	2015	10	1	3	4	0	1 ('15)	0	0	1	
Jason Williams	1	2006	9	2	5	7	2	0	0	0	0	
Justin Williams	2	2002, 2007	14	1	5	6	22	1 ('07)	0	0	1	
Paul Woods	1	1979	8	0	0	0	2	0	0	0	0	
Jason Woolley	1	1992	6	1	2	3	2	0	0	0	0	
Jamie Wright	1	2002	7	1	1	2	2	0	0	0	0	
Tyler Wright	1	2002	7	0	2	2	33	0	0	0	0	
Trent Yawney	2	1991, 1992	16	2	5	7	8	0	1 ('91)	0	1	
Steve Yzerman	3	1985, 1989, 1990	28	18	21	39	16	0	2 ('85, '89)	0	2	Team Captain (1989, 1990); Best Forward (1990); CSHOF (2008); HHOF (2009)
Travis Zajac	2	2009, 2011	12	1	2	3	4	0	1 ('09)	0	1	
Zarley Zalapski	1	1987	10	0	3	3	2	0	0	0	0	
Rob Zamuner	2	1997, 1998	16	4	4	8	20	1 ('97)	0	0	1	

== See also ==
- List of Olympic men's ice hockey players for Canada
- List of IIHF World Under-20 Championship players for Canada
- List of Canadian national ice hockey team rosters
