= List of IIHF World Championship directorate award winners =

The Ice Hockey World Championship is an annual ice hockey tournament organized by the International Ice Hockey Federation (IIHF). The IIHF has given directorate awards for play during each year's championship tournament to the top goaltender, defenceman and forward (all since 1954), and most valuable player chosen by media (since 1999).

== Directorate awards ==
Year	Goaltender	Defence	Forwards	Most Valuable Player
1954	Don Lockhart (CAN)	Lasse Björn (SWE)	Vsevolod Bobrov (URS)	
1955	Don Rigazio (USA)	Karel Gut (TCH)	Bill Warwick (CAN)	
1956	Willard Ikola (USA)	Nikolai Sologubov (URS)	Jack McKenzie (CAN)	
1957	Karel Straka (TCH)	Nikolai Sologubov (URS)	Sven "Tumba" Johansson (SWE)	
1958	Vladimir Nadrchal (TCH)	Ivan Tregubov (URS)	Charlie Burns (CAN)	
1959	Nikolai Puchkov (URS)	J. P. Lamirande (CAN)	Bill Cleary (USA)	
1960	Jack McCartan (USA)	Nikolai Sologubov (URS)	Nisse Nilsson (SWE)	
1961	Seth Martin (CAN)	Ivan Tregubov (URS)	Vlastimil Bubník (TCH)	
1962	Lennart Häggroth (SWE)	John Mayasich (USA)	Sven "Tumba" Johansson (SWE)	
1963	Seth Martin (CAN)	Roland Stoltz (SWE)	Miroslav Vlach (TCH)	
1964	Seth Martin (CAN)	František Tikal (TCH)	Eduard Ivanov (URS)	
1965	Vladimír Dzurilla (TCH)	František Tikal (TCH)	Vyacheslav Starshinov (URS)	
1966	Seth Martin (CAN)	Alexander Ragulin (URS)	Konstantin Loktev (URS)	
1967	Carl Wetzel (USA)	Vitaly Davydov (URS)	Anatoli Firsov (URS)	
1968	Ken Broderick (CAN)	Josef Horešovský (TCH)	Anatoli Firsov (URS)	
1969	Leif Holmqvist (SWE)	Jan Suchý (TCH)	Ulf Sterner (SWE)	
1970	Urpo Ylönen (FIN)	Lennart Svedberg (SWE)	Aleksandr Maltsev (URS)	
1971	Jiří Holeček (TCH)	Jan Suchý (TCH)	Anatoli Firsov (URS)	
1972	Jorma Valtonen (FIN)	František Pospíšil (TCH)	Aleksandr Maltsev (URS)	
1973	Jiří Holeček (TCH)	Valeri Vasiliev (URS)	Boris Mikhailov (URS)	
1974	Vladislav Tretiak (URS)	Lars-Erik Sjöberg (SWE)	Václav Nedomanský (TCH)	
1975	Jiří Holeček (TCH)	Pekka Marjamäki (FIN)	Alexander Yakushev (URS)	
1976	Jiří Holeček (TCH)	František Pospíšil (TCH)	Vladimír Martinec (TCH)	
1977	Göran Högosta (SWE)	Valeri Vasiliev (URS)	Helmuts Balderis (URS)	
1978	Jiří Holeček (TCH)	Viacheslav Fetisov (URS)	Marcel Dionne (CAN)	
1979	Vladislav Tretiak (URS)	Valeri Vasiliev (URS)	Wilf Paiement (CAN)	
1981	Vladislav Tretiak (URS)	Larry Robinson (CAN)	Aleksandr Maltsev (URS)	
1982	Jiří Králík (TCH)	Viacheslav Fetisov (URS)	Victor Shalimov (URS)	
1983	Vladislav Tretiak (URS)	Alexei Kasatonov (URS)	Jiří Lála (TCH)	
1985	Jiří Králík (TCH)	Viacheslav Fetisov (URS)	Sergei Makarov (URS)	
1986	Peter Lindmark (SWE)	Viacheslav Fetisov (URS)	Vladimir Krutov (URS)	
1987	Dominik Hašek (TCH)	Craig Hartsburg (CAN)	Vladimir Krutov (URS)	
1989	Dominik Hašek (TCH)	Viacheslav Fetisov (URS)	Brian Bellows (CAN)	
1990	Artūrs Irbe (URS)	Mikhail Tatarinov (URS)	Steve Yzerman (CAN)	
1991	Markus Ketterer (FIN)	Jamie Macoun (CAN)	Valeri Kamensky (URS)	
1992	Tommy Söderström (SWE)	Róbert Švehla (TCH)	Mats Sundin (SWE)	
1993	Petr Bříza (CZE)	Ilya Byakin (RUS)	Eric Lindros (CAN)	
1994	Bill Ranford (CAN)	Magnus Svensson (SWE)	Paul Kariya (CAN)	
1995	Jarmo Myllys (FIN)	Christer Olsson (SWE)	Saku Koivu (FIN)	
1996	Roman Turek (CZE)	Alexei Zhitnik (RUS)	Yanic Perreault (CAN)	
1997	Tommy Salo (SWE)	Rob Blake (CAN)	Michael Nylander (SWE)	
1998	Ari Sulander (FIN)	František Kučera (CZE)	Peter Forsberg (SWE)	
1999	Tommy Salo (SWE)	František Kučera (CZE)	Saku Koivu (FIN)	Teemu Selänne (FIN)
2000	Roman Čechmánek (CZE)	Petteri Nummelin (FIN)	Miroslav Šatan (SVK)	Martin Prochazka (CZE)
2001	Milan Hnilička (CZE)	Kim Johnsson (SWE)	Sami Kapanen (FIN)	David Moravec (CZE)
2002	Maxim Sokolov (RUS)	Daniel Tjärnqvist (SWE)	Niklas Hagman (FIN)	Miroslav Šatan (SVK)
2003	Sean Burke (CAN)	Jay Bouwmeester (CAN)	Mats Sundin (SWE)	Mats Sundin (SWE)
2004	Ty Conklin (USA)	Dick Tärnström (SWE)	Dany Heatley (CAN)	Dany Heatley (CAN)
2005	Tomáš Vokoun (CZE)	Wade Redden (CAN)	Alexei Kovalev (RUS)	Joe Thornton (CAN)
2006	Johan Holmqvist (SWE)	Niklas Kronwall (SWE)	Sidney Crosby (CAN)	Niklas Kronwall (SWE)
2007	Kari Lehtonen (FIN)	Andrei Markov (RUS)	Aleksey Morozov (RUS)	Rick Nash (CAN)
2008	Evgeni Nabokov (RUS)	Brent Burns (CAN)	Dany Heatley (CAN)	Dany Heatley (CAN)
2009	Andrei Mezin (BLR)	Shea Weber (CAN)	Ilya Kovalchuk (RUS)	Ilya Kovalchuk (RUS)
2010	Dennis Endras (GER)	Petteri Nummelin (FIN)	Pavel Datsyuk (RUS)	Dennis Endras (GER)
2011	Viktor Fasth (SWE)	Alex Pietrangelo (CAN)	Jaromír Jágr (CZE)	Viktor Fasth (SWE)
2012	Ján Laco (SVK)	Zdeno Chára (SVK)	Evgeni Malkin (RUS)	Evgeni Malkin (RUS)
2013	Jhonas Enroth (SWE)	Roman Josi (SUI)	Petri Kontiola (FIN)	Roman Josi (SUI)
2014	Sergei Bobrovsky (RUS)	Seth Jones (USA)	Viktor Tikhonov (RUS)	Pekka Rinne (FIN)
2015	Pekka Rinne (FIN)	Brent Burns (CAN)	Jason Spezza (CAN)	Jaromír Jágr (CZE)
2016	Mikko Koskinen (FIN)	Mike Matheson (CAN)	Patrik Laine (FIN)	Patrik Laine (FIN)
2017	Andrei Vasilevskiy (RUS)	Dennis Seidenberg (GER)	Artemi Panarin (RUS)	William Nylander (SWE)
2018	Frederik Andersen (DEN)	John Klingberg (SWE)	Sebastian Aho (FIN)	Patrick Kane (USA)
2019	Andrei Vasilevskiy (RUS)	Filip Hronek (CZE)	Nikita Kucherov (RUS)	Mark Stone (CAN)
2021	Cal Petersen (USA)	Moritz Seider (GER)	Peter Cehlárik (SVK)	Andrew Mangiapane (CAN)
2022	Juho Olkinuora (FIN)	Mikko Lehtonen (FIN)	Roman Červenka (CZE)	Juho Olkinuora (FIN)
2023	Artūrs Šilovs (LAT)	MacKenzie Weegar (CAN)	JJ Peterka (GER)	Artūrs Šilovs (LAT)
2024	Lukáš Dostál (CZE)	Roman Josi (SUI)	Kevin Fiala (SUI)	Kevin Fiala (SUI)
2025	Leonardo Genoni (SUI)	Zach Werenski (USA)	David Pastrňák (CZE)	Leonardo Genoni (SUI)
2026	Henrik Haukeland (NOR)	Roman Josi (SUI)	Macklin Celebrini (CAN)	Roman Josi (SUI)

== See also ==
- List of IIHF World Championship medalists
- IIHF Centennial All-Star Team
