= Dave Phillips (ice hockey) =

British ice hockey player (born 1987)

- Born: 14 August 1987 (age 38) Kingston upon Hull, England
- Height: 6 ft 3 in (191 cm)
- Weight: 188 lb (85 kg; 13 st 6 lb)
- Position: Defence
- Shoots: Right
- NIHL team Former teams: Sheffield Steeldogs; Sheffield Steelers; Rockford IceHogs; Chicago Wolves; Lake Erie Monsters; Coventry Blaze; Hull Stingrays; Manchester Storm; Dunaújvárosi Acélbikák; Belfast Giants; Hull Seahawks
- National team: Great Britain
- Playing career: 2004–present

David Phillips (born 14 August 1987) is a British professional ice hockey defenceman, currently playing for National Ice Hockey League (NIHL) side Sheffield Steeldogs. Phillips was previously with EIHL sides Belfast Giants and Sheffield Steelers.

== Playing career ==
Phillips began his career within the Kingston upon Hull club in England, playing for Kingston Crunch under-16, Kingston Predators under-19 and then Kingston Jets of the English National League in November 2003. He then moved up to the Hull Stingrays in the British National League, a team which joined the Elite League in 2006. Phillips established himself as one of Britain's top defencemen and served as assistant captain of the Stingrays in the 2007–08 season. He moved to the Belfast Giants for the 2008–09 season, becoming new coach Steve Thornton's first signing. Establishing a career high 25 points in 54 games, Phillips helped the Giants to be crowned Champions of the Challenge Cup and Knockout Cup.

On 28 April 2009, Phillips re-signed to remain with the Giants for the following season. However, with NHL ambitions, and following an impressive performance in a Chicago Blackhawks evaluation camp, Phillips was signed to a two-way contract with American Hockey League affiliate team, the Rockford IceHogs on 12 July 2009. He participated on an invitation in the Blackhawks training camp, before returning to the IceHogs to begin the 2009–10 season. After making his North American debut against the Peoria Rivermen on 4 October 2009, Phillips was briefly loaned to ECHL team Toledo Walleye, scoring his first North American professional goal, before he was recalled to the IceHogs to remain for the majority of the season posting 6 assists in 52 games.

On 8 April 2010, it was confirmed that Phillips had agreed to a one-year deal with fellow AHL team, the Chicago Wolves for the 2010–11 season. Phillips was then assigned to the Walleye of the ECHL to begin the 2010 season. After appearing in one game with the Wolves in November he was returned to Toledo. With only five points in 31 games with the Walleye, on 12 November, Phillips was reassigned by the Wolves to fellow ECHL team, the Gwinnett Gladiators. On 25 December, Dave was released from his contract with the Wolves and shortly joined fellow AHL team, the Lake Erie Monsters, on a professional try out on 5 January 2011. After posting three assists in 10 games with the Monsters, Phillips returned to the Gladiators. Towards the end of his first stint with the Monsters, Phillips signed with Australian-based team, the Adelaide Adrenaline, for the forthcoming 2011 season on 12 January 2011.

On 10 May 2011, it was announced that Phillips would be returning to Britain and the Elite Ice Hockey League with the Coventry Blaze.

After the Hull Stingrays announced they would not take part in the 2015–16 season, who Phillips was to play for, it was made public that the newly reformed Manchester Storm along with Matty Davies would sign both players for the coming season.

In 2016, Phillips signed with the Sheffield Steelers, remaining with the team until 2020. However, following the suspension of the 2020–21 Elite League season, Phillips signed abroad for a third time after agreeing to join Hungarian Erste Liga side Dunaújvárosi Acélbikák.

In February 2021, Phillips moved to Sweden to sign for Hockeyettan side Karlskrona HK. Later that month, Phillips signed for UK NIHL side Sheffield Steeldogs ahead of their Spring Cup series, before returning to the Sheffield Steelers in time for the 2021 Elite Series.

In May 2023, Phillips became the sixth men's Great Britain ice hockey player to win 100 senior caps, a milestone he reached at the 2023 IIHF World Championship Division I.

Phillips then re-joined the Belfast Giants ahead of the 2023–24 Elite League season.

In June 2024, Phillips joined hometown team the Hull Seahawks ahead of the 2024–25 NIHL season.

Phillips made his return to Sheffield ice hockey when he signed with the Sheffield Steeldogs for the 2025-26 season.

== Career statistics ==
=== Regular season and playoffs ===
			Regular season					Playoffs
Season	Team	League	GP	G	A	Pts	PIM	GP	G	A	Pts	PIM
2002–03	Kingston Jets	ENL	17	3	4	7	10	—	—	—	—	—
2003–04	Hull Stingrays	BNL	9	0	0	0	0	—	—	—	—	—
2004–05	Hull Stingrays	BNL	30	1	4	5	20	10	1	1	2	8
2005–06	Hull Stingrays	EPL	44	7	12	19	104	6	0	0	0	8
2006–07	Hull Stingrays	EIHL	49	3	6	9	71	—	—	—	—	—
2007–08	Hull Stingrays	EIHL	54	2	13	15	83	—	—	—	—	—
2008–09	Belfast Giants	EIHL	54	7	18	25	69	2	1	1	2	0
2009–10	Rockford IceHogs	AHL	52	0	6	6	52	4	0	0	0	0
2009–10	Toledo Walleye	ECHL	6	1	1	2	2	—	—	—	—	—
2010–11	Toledo Walleye	ECHL	31	2	3	5	22	—	—	—	—	—
2010–11	Chicago Wolves	AHL	1	0	0	0	0	—	—	—	—	—
2010–11	Gwinnett Gladiators	ECHL	13	0	5	5	8	—	—	—	—	—
2010–11	Lake Erie Monsters	AHL	11	0	3	3	13	—	—	—	—	—
2011	Adelaide Adrenaline	AIHL	6	4	1	5	28	—	—	—	—	—
2011–12	Coventry Blaze	EIHL	44	4	19	23	89	—	—	—	—	—
2011–12	SønderjyskE Ishockey	DEN	7	1	2	3	10	11	3	3	6	33
2012–13	Belfast Giants	EIHL	52	5	18	23	84	4	1	0	1	6
2013–14	Belfast Giants	EIHL	54	2	4	6	123	4	0	1	1	14
2014–15	Belfast Giants	EIHL	55	4	18	22	101	4	0	0	0	0
2015–16	Manchester Storm	EIHL	41	8	11	19	106	—	—	—	—	—
2016–17	Sheffield Steelers	EIHL	52	2	9	11	44	4	0	0	0	4
2017–18	Sheffield Steelers	EIHL	50	1	10	11	46	4	0	0	0	2
2018–19	Sheffield Steelers	EIHL	42	1	9	10	82	2	0	1	1	0
2019–20	Sheffield Steelers	EIHL	49	3	11	14	16	—	—	—	—	—
2020–21	Dunaújvárosi Acélbikák	Erste Liga	12	1	1	2	—	—	—	—	—	—
2020–21	Sheffield Steeldogs	NIHL Spring Cup	12	0	5	5	38	—	—	—	—	—
2020–21	Sheffield Steelers	Elite Series	16	0	7	7	35	—	—	—	—	—
2021–22	Sheffield Steelers	EIHL	50	2	10	12	48	2	0	0	0	2
2022–23	Sheffield Steelers	EIHL	49	0	10	10	20	4	0	1	1	2
2023–24	Belfast Giants	EIHL	52	1	4	5	32	4	0	0	0	0
2024–25	Hull Seahawks	NIHL	26	3	6	9	48	2	0	2	2	2
2025–26	Sheffield Steeldogs	NIHL	36	0	3	3	63	6	0	1	1	6
AHL totals			64	0	9	9	65	4	0	0	0	0

=== International ===
Year	Team	Event	GP	G	A	Pts	PIM
2004	Great Britain	WJC18-D2	5	1	1	2	2
2005	Great Britain	WJC18-D1	4	1	0	1	18
2005	Great Britain	WJC-D1	5	0	1	1	16
2006	Great Britain	WJC-D2	5	3	2	5	12
2006	Great Britain	WC-D1	5	0	3	3	10
2007	Great Britain	WJC-D1	5	0	2	2	22
2007	Great Britain	WC-D1	5	0	0	0	0
2008	Great Britain	WC-D1	5	0	2	2	6
2009	Great Britain	OGQ	3	1	0	1	2
2009	Great Britain	WC-D1	5	1	1	2	2
2011	Great Britain	WC-D1	5	0	1	1	2
2012	Great Britain	WC-D1	5	0	1	1	10
2013	Great Britain	OGQ	6	0	0	0	0
2013	Great Britain	WC-D1	5	1	0	1	2
2014	Great Britain	WC-D1	5	0	2	2	8
2015	Great Britain	WC-D1	5	1	1	2	4
2016	Great Britain	OGQ	3	1	4	5	4
2016	Great Britain	WC-D1	5	0	1	1	2
2017	Great Britain	WC-D1	5	1	1	2	2
2018	Great Britain	WC-D1	5	0	0	0	6
2019	Great Britain	WC	7	0	3	3	2
2020	Great Britain	OGQ	3	0	1	1	4
2021	Great Britain	WC	7	0	2	2	12
2022	Great Britain	WC	7	0	0	0	4
2023	Great Britain	WC-D1	5	0	1	1	2
2024	Great Britain	OGQ	6	0	1	1	0
2024	Great Britain	WC	7	0	0	0	0
Junior totals			24	5	6	11	70
Senior totals			114	6	25	31	84
