= Christoph Ullmann =

German ice hockey player (born 1983)

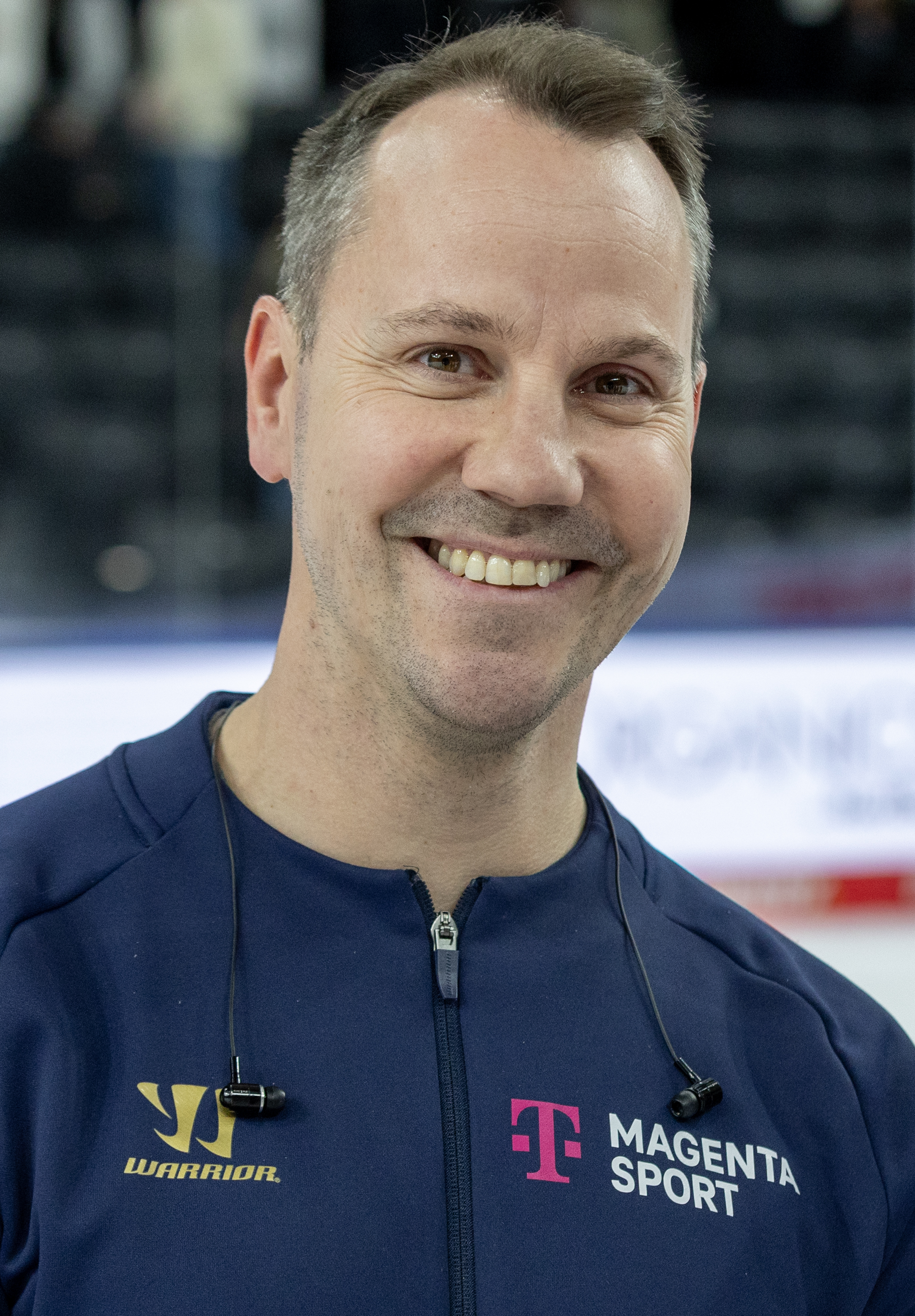
- Born: 19 May 1983 (age 42) Altötting, West Germany
- Height: 6 ft 0 in (183 cm)
- Weight: 198 lb (90 kg; 14 st 2 lb)
- Position: Forward
- Shot: Left
- Played for: Kölner Haie; Adler Mannheim; Augsburger Panther
- National team: Germany
- Playing career: 2000–2020

Christoph Ullmann (born 19 May 1983) is a German former professional ice hockey player. He played the duration of his career in the Deutsche Eishockey Liga (DEL).

== Playing career ==
On April 3, 2011, Ullmann left Kölner Haie and returned for another spell with Adler Mannheim of the Deutsche Eishockey Liga (DEL). He played a further 7 seasons with Mannheim, leaving at the conclusion of the 2017–18 season, having compiled a career low with 7 points in 41 games.

As a free agent, Ullman extended his career by agreeing to a one-year contract with his third DEL club, Augsburger Panther, on April 19, 2018. He later returned for a second season before ending his 20-year professional career following the early end to the 2019–20 season due to the COVID-19 pandemic.

== International play ==
Ullmann has participated in eight ice Hockey World Championships as a member of the German National men's ice hockey team, including the 2004, 2007, 2008, 2009, 2010, 2011, 2012, and the 2013 IIHF World Championship.

== Career statistics ==
=== Regular season and playoffs ===
| | | | Regular season | | | | | Playoffs |
| Season | Team | League | GP | G | A | Pts | PIM | GP | G | A | Pts | PIM |
|---|---|---|---|---|---|---|---|---|---|---|---|---|
| 1999–00 | EC Kölner II | 4.GBun | 13 | 5 | 16 | 21 | 48 | 8 | 6 | 5 | 11 | 9 |
| 2000–01 | EC Kölner II | 4.GBun | 27 | 35 | 31 | 66 | 56 | 14 | 11 | 19 | 30 | 34 |
| 2001–02 | Kölner Haie | DEL | 17 | 0 | 1 | 1 | 2 | — | — | — | — | — |
| 2001–02 | EV Duisburg | 2.GBun | 45 | 5 | 4 | 9 | 34 | — | — | — | — | — |
| 2002–03 | Kölner Haie | DEL | 26 | 1 | 1 | 2 | 2 | 2 | 0 | 0 | 0 | 0 |
| 2002–03 | EV Duisburg | 2.GBun | 22 | 3 | 5 | 8 | 24 | — | — | — | — | — |
| 2003–04 | Adler Mannheim | DEL | 51 | 10 | 10 | 20 | 42 | 6 | 1 | 0 | 1 | 2 |
| 2003–04 | Heilbronner Falken | 2.GBun | 1 | 0 | 1 | 1 | 0 | 2 | 1 | 0 | 1 | 0 |
| 2004–05 | Adler Mannheim | DEL | 49 | 11 | 9 | 20 | 93 | 13 | 1 | 4 | 5 | 33 |
| 2004–05 | Heilbronner Falken | 3.GBun | 2 | 1 | 1 | 2 | 0 | — | — | — | — | — |
| 2005–06 | Adler Mannheim | DEL | 52 | 9 | 17 | 26 | 34 | — | — | — | — | — |
| 2006–07 | Adler Mannheim | DEL | 48 | 13 | 11 | 24 | 18 | 11 | 2 | 1 | 3 | 8 |
| 2007–08 | Adler Mannheim | DEL | 53 | 14 | 16 | 30 | 42 | 5 | 0 | 5 | 5 | 16 |
| 2008–09 | Kölner Haie | DEL | 49 | 20 | 28 | 48 | 32 | — | — | — | — | — |
| 2009–10 | Kölner Haie | DEL | 31 | 8 | 18 | 26 | 36 | 3 | 1 | 3 | 4 | 4 |
| 2010–11 | Kölner Haie | DEL | 52 | 23 | 25 | 48 | 22 | 5 | 1 | 3 | 4 | 4 |
| 2011–12 | Adler Mannheim | DEL | 40 | 15 | 17 | 32 | 34 | 14 | 10 | 9 | 19 | 6 |
| 2012–13 | Adler Mannheim | DEL | 34 | 11 | 11 | 22 | 18 | 6 | 2 | 0 | 2 | 4 |
| 2013–14 | Adler Mannheim | DEL | 39 | 10 | 11 | 21 | 16 | — | — | — | — | — |
| 2014–15 | Adler Mannheim | DEL | 51 | 11 | 13 | 24 | 36 | 13 | 4 | 6 | 10 | 6 |
| 2015–16 | Adler Mannheim | DEL | 52 | 21 | 8 | 29 | 26 | 3 | 4 | 1 | 5 | 8 |
| 2016–17 | Adler Mannheim | DEL | 51 | 5 | 20 | 25 | 26 | 7 | 0 | 1 | 1 | 2 |
| 2017–18 | Adler Mannheim | DEL | 41 | 5 | 2 | 7 | 8 | 8 | 3 | 1 | 4 | 4 |
| 2018–19 | Augsburger Panther | DEL | 46 | 7 | 7 | 14 | 20 | 8 | 0 | 0 | 0 | 14 |
| 2019–20 | Augsburger Panther | DEL | 32 | 1 | 2 | 3 | 20 | — | — | — | — | — |
| DEL totals | | | 814 | 195 | 227 | 422 | 527 | 104 | 29 | 34 | 63 | 111 |

=== International ===
| Year | Team | Event | GP | G | A | Pts | PIM |
|---|---|---|---|---|---|---|---|
| 2002 | Germany | WJC-D1 | 5 | 0 | 2 | 2 | 8 |
| 2003 | Germany | WJC | 6 | 4 | 0 | 4 | 4 |
| 2004 | Germany | WC | 3 | 0 | 0 | 0 | 0 |
| 2006 | Germany | WC-D1 | 5 | 1 | 2 | 3 | 0 |
| 2007 | Germany | WC | 6 | 2 | 0 | 2 | 4 |
| 2008 | Germany | WC | 6 | 1 | 3 | 4 | 0 |
| 2009 | Germany | WC | 6 | 1 | 1 | 2 | 10 |
| 2010 | Germany | WC | 9 | 0 | 1 | 1 | 4 |
| 2011 | Germany | WC | 7 | 0 | 3 | 3 | 4 |
| 2012 | Germany | WC | 7 | 0 | 5 | 5 | 0 |
| 2013 | Germany | WC | 7 | 1 | 1 | 2 | 2 |
| 2015 | Germany | WC | 4 | 0 | 0 | 0 | 2 |
| Junior totals | | | 11 | 4 | 2 | 6 | 12 |
| Senior totals | | | 60 | 6 | 16 | 22 | 26 |
