= Mads Christensen (ice hockey, born 1987) =

Danish-German ice hockey player

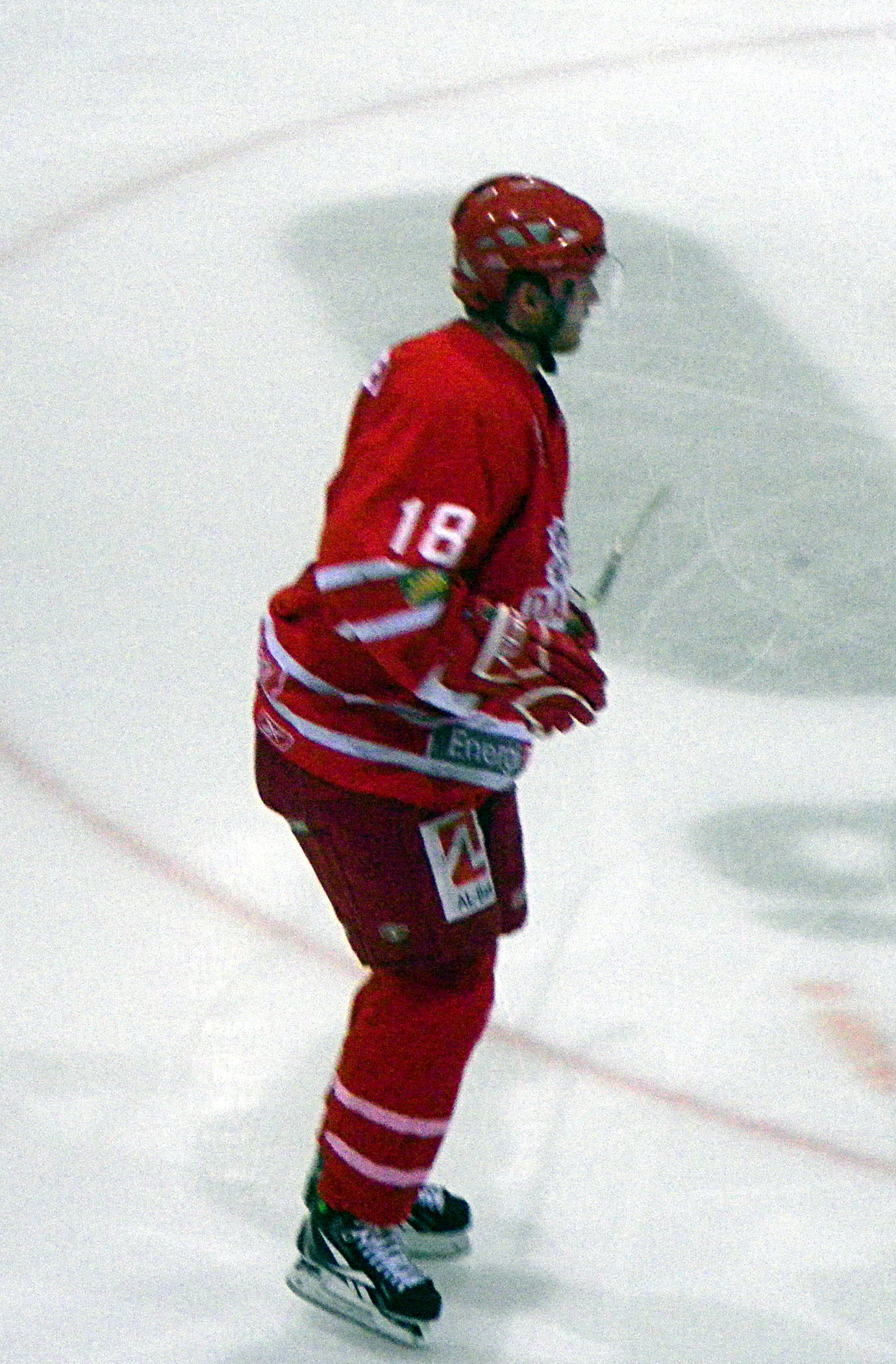
- Born: 2 April 1987 (age 37); Herning, Denmark
- Height: 1.79 m (5 ft 10 in)
- Weight: 85 kg (187 lb; 13 st 5 lb)
- Position: Forward
- Shoots: Left
- Metal team Former teams: Herning Blue Fox; SønderjyskE; Iserlohn Roosters; Eisbären Berlin; EHC München
- National team: Denmark
- Playing career: 2003–present

Mads Christensen (born 2 April 1987 in Herning) is a Danish-German professional ice hockey forward who currently plays for Herning Blue Fox of the Metal Ligaen (DEN).

== Playing career ==
A product of Herning IK, he won the Danish championship with the Blue Fox in 2003, 2005, 2007 and 2008. In 2009, he captured the title with SønderjyskE.

After spending the 2009-10 season with the Iserlohn Roosters of the German DEL, he signed with fellow DEL side Eisbären Berlin in 2010. During his four-year tenure in the German capital, he won three straight championships titles (2011, 2012 and 2013) and the 2011 European Trophy. In 2014, he headed to EHC München and helped the team capture the 2016 and 2017 German championships.

Christensen gained German citizenship in September 2017.

== Career statistics ==
=== Regular season and playoffs ===
			Regular season					Playoffs
Season	Team	League	GP	G	A	Pts	PIM	GP	G	A	Pts	PIM
2002–03	Herning Blue Fox	DEN	4	0	0	0	0	2	0	1	1	0
2003–04	Herning Blue Fox	DEN	20	0	1	1	0	—	—	—	—	—
2004–05	Herning Blue Fox	DEN	31	1	6	7	16	15	1	0	1	4
2005–06	Herning Blue Fox	DEN	33	15	6	21	43	15	3	10	13	2
2006–07	Herning Blue Fox	DEN	36	11	10	21	26	15	1	3	4	18
2007–08	Herning Blue Fox	DEN	44	15	15	30	99	16	4	3	7	4
2008–09	SønderjyskE	DEN	39	17	18	35	58	15	8	5	13	28
2009–10	Iserlohn Roosters	DEL	51	14	31	45	60	—	—	—	—	—
2010–11	Eisbären Berlin	DEL	27	5	4	9	10	12	4	2	6	6
2011–12	Eisbären Berlin	DEL	33	6	12	18	18	13	4	2	6	12
2012–13	Eisbären Berlin	DEL	47	11	5	16	40	13	7	2	9	28
2013–14	Eisbären Berlin	DEL	40	9	8	17	34	3	1	0	1	4
2014–15	EHC München	DEL	47	17	12	29	42	1	0	0	0	0
2015–16	EHC München	DEL	51	9	25	34	56	14	6	4	10	20
2016–17	EHC München	DEL	52	16	21	37	62	14	1	6	7	24
2017–18	EHC München	DEL	47	14	8	22	46	17	7	5	12	16
2018–19	EHC München	DEL	11	2	0	2	10	18	2	0	2	18
2019–20	EHC München	DEL	18	0	5	5	12	—	—	—	—	—
DEL totals			424	103	131	234	390	105	32	21	53	128

=== International ===
Year	Team	Event	GP	G	A	Pts	PIM
2004	Denmark	WJC18	6	1	1	2	2
2005	Denmark	WJC18	6	1	2	3	14
2005	Denmark	WJC-D1	5	0	0	0	8
2006	Denmark	WJC-D1	2	3	1	4	6
2007	Denmark	WJC-D1	5	2	5	7	2
2007	Denmark	WC	6	1	1	2	14
2008	Denmark	WC	4	0	0	0	2
2009	Denmark	WC	6	2	1	3	2
2010	Denmark	WC	7	2	0	2	2
2011	Denmark	WC	6	4	1	5	6
2013	Denmark	OGQ	3	0	1	1	0
2013	Denmark	WC	3	0	2	2	4
2014	Denmark	WC	7	0	3	3	4
2016	Denmark	WC	8	0	2	2	6
2016	Denmark	OGQ	3	0	0	0	2
2017	Denmark	WC	7	0	1	1	8
2018	Denmark	WC	5	0	0	0	0
Junior totals			24	7	9	16	32
Senior totals			65	9	12	21	50
