= Nikolay Kulemin =

Russian ice hockey player (born 1986)

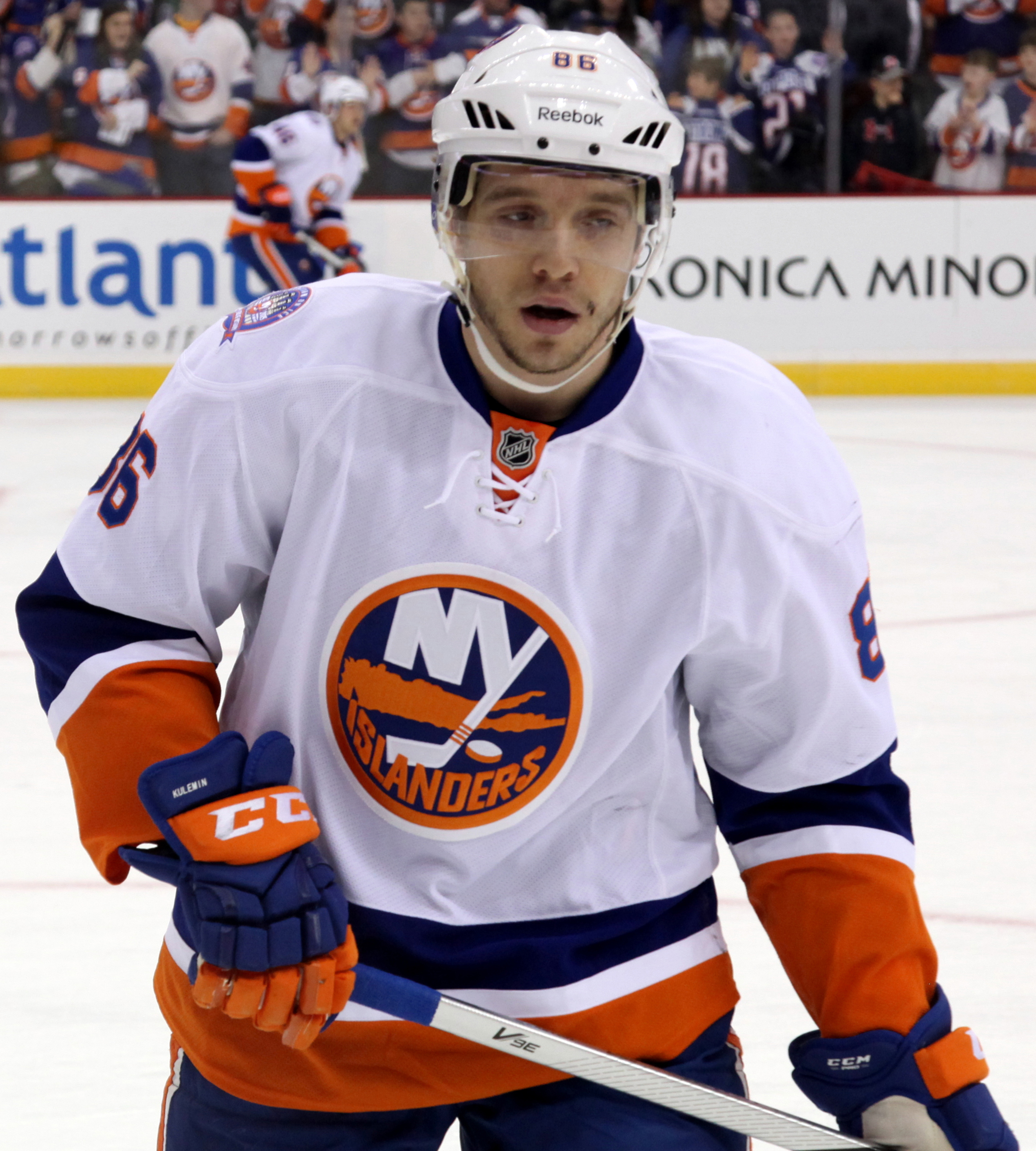
- Kulemin with the New York Islanders in March 2015
- Born: 14 July 1986 (age 40) Magnitogorsk, Russian SFSR, Soviet Union
- Height: 6 ft 1 in (185 cm)
- Weight: 212 lb (96 kg; 15 st 2 lb)
- Position: Forward
- Shot: Left
- Played for: Metallurg Magnitogorsk; Toronto Maple Leafs; New York Islanders; Salavat Yulaev Ufa
- National team: Russia
- NHL draft: 44th overall, 2006; Toronto Maple Leafs
- Playing career: 2003–2024

Nikolay Vladimirovich Kulemin (Russian: Николай Владимирович Кулёмин; born 14 July 1986) is a Russian former professional ice hockey. Kulemin played in the National Hockey League (NHL) for the Toronto Maple Leafs and New York Islanders, the former of which drafted him in the second round, 44th overall, in the 2006 NHL entry draft.

== Playing career ==
On 25 May 2007, Kulemin signed a three-year contract with the Toronto Maple Leafs, but stayed in Russia for the 2007–08 season on a "handshake agreement" between the Maple Leafs and Metallurg Magnitogorsk of the Kontinental Hockey League (KHL). During the early stages of the 2008–09 season, his first in the NHL, Kulemin found chemistry on a line with teammates Niklas Hagman and Mikhail Grabovski. Kulemin's first NHL goal occurred in his first NHL game, against the Detroit Red Wings, on goaltender Chris Osgood, in Toronto's 2008–09 season opener on 9 October 2008. The goal ended up as the game winner in a 3–2 Toronto win. Near the end of the season, after the trade of Leafs forward Nik Antropov, Kulemin was used mainly on a line with Grabovski and Alexei Ponikarovsky. In a game against the Montreal Canadiens on 21 March 2009, soon after the line was created, Kulemin posted a career-high three points (one goal and two assists) in a 5–2 Toronto win. Notably, Ponikarovsky, a Ukrainian, helped Kulemin become more comfortable in North America by translating and serving as a mentor on and off the ice.

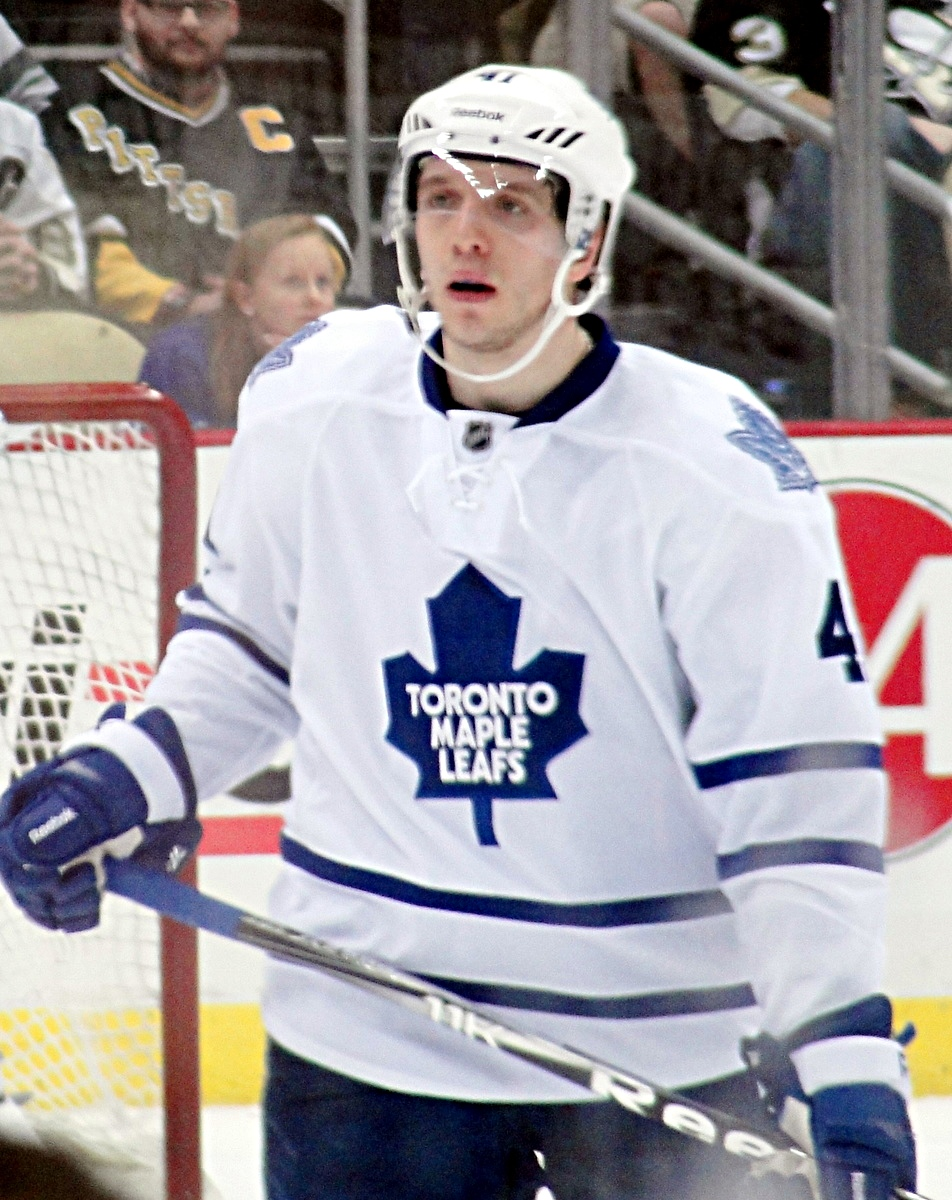
Kulemin with the Maple Leafs in 2012

Kulemin showed a small offensive improvement in his second season, going from 15 goals and 31 points to 16 goals and 36 points. His 16 goals were tied for fourth on the Maple Leafs by season's end, and his 36 points were fifth. In late January, he was selected as a reserve by Russia for the upcoming 2010 Winter Olympics should an injury occur during the tournament. On 2 July 2010, Kulemin signed a two-year contract worth $2.35 million per year with the Maple Leafs.

The 2010–11 season was a big leap for Kulemin. Playing on a line with Mikhail Grabovski and Clarke MacArthur, Kulemin posted new career highs in goals and points. On 5 April 2011, Kulemin became the first Russian-born Toronto Maple Leaf to score 30 goals in a season since Alexander Mogilny scored 33 in 2002–03. Kulemin, along with Mats Sundin, Phil Kessel, James van Riemsdyk, Mogilny, Nazem Kadri, William Nylander, John Tavares, and Auston Matthews, are the only Leafs to score 30 or more since the 1999–2000 season. He also scored a career-high four points against the Atlanta Thrashers on 7 January 2011.

Despite the prior season's progress, Kulemin dropped to seven goals over 70 games in 2011–12, with his shooting percentage falling from 17.3% to 6.5%. Despite his setbacks offensively, Kulemin was re-signed by Toronto on 20 July 2012 to another two-year contract, worth $2.8 million per year. During the 2012–13 NHL lockout, he returned to the Metallurg Magnitogorsk, where he scored 38 points in 36 games. Upon the lockout ending he returned to Toronto, and scored seven goals and 23 points in 48 games. In the 2013 Stanley Cup playoffs, Kulemin managed only one assist in seven games as the Leafs were eliminated by the Boston Bruins.

In the 2013–14 season, Kulemin was selected to play in the 2014 Winter Olympics for Russia, held in Sochi. With the Maple Leafs, Kulemin managed only nine goals and a career-low 11 assists for a mere 20 points. Over 70 games he notched only 81 shots, a far cry from his 173 shots in 2010–11.

On 2 July 2014, as a free agent, Kulemin left the Maple Leafs after six seasons to sign a four-year contract with the New York Islanders. Kulemin joined the Islanders along with his Maple Leafs linemate and friend Mikhail Grabovski, making it known to teams during free agency that they wanted to sign together. He was able to somewhat rekindle his offensive touch, scoring 15 goals and 31 points in his first season with New York. On 25 April 2015, Kulemin scored what was thought to be the final NHL game-winning goal at Nassau Veterans Memorial Coliseum in game six of the first round of the 2015 playoffs. This distinction now belongs to Anthony Beauvillier who scored the overtime winner in game six of the Stanley Cup semifinals of the 2021 Stanley Cup playoffs against Tampa Bay Lightning.

In the 2015–16 season, Kulemin dropped back to only nine goals and 22 points with the Islanders, managing only 92 shots in 81 games. In the 2016 playoffs, he added four points in 11 games.

After concluding his contract with the Islanders, on 4 July 2018, Kulemin left the NHL after 10 seasons to return to Metallurg Magnitogorsk, signing a three-year contract.

As a free agent following the conclusion of his contract with Metallurg, Kulemin left as a free agent and was signed to a one-year deal to continue in the KHL with Salavat Yulaev Ufa on 27 August 2021.

On 5 September 2024, Kulemin signed a professional try-out agreement (PTO) with the Ottawa Senators. Kulemin failed to make the team and was released from the PTO on 30 September.

== Personal life ==
Kulemin and his wife have two children.

== Career statistics ==
=== Regular season and playoffs ===
			Regular season					Playoffs
Season	Team	League	GP	G	A	Pts	PIM	GP	G	A	Pts	PIM
2003–04	Metallurg–2 Magnitogorsk	RUS.3	43	8	18	26	91	—	—	—	—	—
2004–05	Metallurg–2 Magnitogorsk	RUS.3	43	9	13	22	44	—	—	—	—	—
2005–06	Metallurg Magnitogorsk	RSL	31	5	8	13	8	11	2	4	6	6
2005–06	Metallurg–2 Magnitogorsk	RUS.3	4	3	1	4	6	—	—	—	—	—
2006–07	Metallurg Magnitogorsk	RSL	54	27	12	39	42	15	10	1	11	10
2007–08	Metallurg Magnitogorsk	RSL	57	21	12	33	63	11	2	2	4	29
2008–09	Toronto Maple Leafs	NHL	73	15	16	31	18	—	—	—	—	—
2008–09	Toronto Marlies	AHL	5	0	0	0	0	—	—	—	—	—
2009–10	Toronto Maple Leafs	NHL	78	16	20	36	16	—	—	—	—	—
2010–11	Toronto Maple Leafs	NHL	82	30	27	57	26	—	—	—	—	—
2011–12	Toronto Maple Leafs	NHL	70	7	21	28	6	—	—	—	—	—
2012–13	Metallurg Magnitogorsk	KHL	36	14	24	38	26	—	—	—	—	—
2012–13	Toronto Maple Leafs	NHL	48	7	16	23	22	7	0	1	1	0
2013–14	Toronto Maple Leafs	NHL	70	9	11	20	24	—	—	—	—	—
2014–15	New York Islanders	NHL	82	15	16	31	21	7	1	1	2	2
2015–16	New York Islanders	NHL	81	9	13	22	22	11	1	3	4	2
2016–17	New York Islanders	NHL	72	12	11	23	18	—	—	—	—	—
2017–18	New York Islanders	NHL	13	1	2	3	0	—	—	—	—	—
2018–19	Metallurg Magnitogorsk	KHL	52	16	19	35	16	6	0	0	0	2
2019–20	Metallurg Magnitogorsk	KHL	57	12	8	20	18	5	1	0	1	0
2020–21	Metallurg Magnitogorsk	KHL	22	6	1	7	6	12	0	1	1	4
2021–22	Salavat Yulaev Ufa	KHL	45	14	13	27	12	11	3	0	3	8
2022–23	Salavat Yulaev Ufa	KHL	68	13	15	28	24	5	1	0	1	2
2023–24	Salavat Yulaev Ufa	KHL	46	13	12	25	10	2	0	0	0	0
RSL totals			142	53	32	85	113	37	14	7	21	45
NHL totals			669	121	153	274	173	25	2	5	7	4
KHL totals			326	88	92	180	112	41	5	1	6	16

=== International ===
Medal record

Men's ice hockey

Representing Russia

World Championships
Bronze medal – third place	2007 Russia	
Silver medal – second place	2010 Germany	
Gold medal – first place	2012 Finland	
Gold medal – first place	2014 Belarus	
Silver medal – second place	2015 Czech Republic	

World Junior Championships
Silver medal – second place	2006 Canada	

IIHF World U18 Championships
Gold medal – first place	2004 Belarus	

Year	Team	Event	Result	GP	G	A	Pts	PIM
2004	Russia	WJC18	1st place, gold medalist(s)	6	0	2	2	2
2006	Russia	WJC	2nd place, silver medalist(s)	4	4	2	6	25
2006	Russia	WC	5th	7	1	3	4	2
2007	Russia	WC	3rd place, bronze medalist(s)	9	2	1	3	0
2010	Russia	WC	2nd place, silver medalist(s)	9	3	2	5	25
2011	Russia	WC	4th	9	1	0	1	2
2012	Russia	WC	1st place, gold medalist(s)	10	1	3	4	0
2014	Russia	OG	5th	5	0	0	0	2
2014	Russia	WC	1st place, gold medalist(s)	10	3	4	7	2
2015	Russia	WC	2nd place, silver medalist(s)	9	1	7	8	2
2016	Russia	WCH	4th	4	0	2	2	0
Junior totals				10	4	4	8	27
Senior totals				72	12	22	34	35

== Awards and honours ==
=== Individual awards ===
- Russian Super League most valuable player – 2007

=== Team awards ===
- Tampere Cup – 2006
- Česká Pojišťovna Cup – 2006
- Karjala Cup – 2006
- Channel One Cup – 2006
- Russian Super League championship – 2007
