= 2012 World Ice Hockey Championships =

2012 World Ice Hockey Championships may refer to:

- 2012 Men's World Ice Hockey Championships
- 2012 World Junior Ice Hockey Championships
- 2012 IIHF World U18 Championships
