= 2007 World Ice Hockey Championships =

2007 World Ice Hockey Championships may refer to:

- 2007 Men's World Ice Hockey Championships
- 2007 Women's World Ice Hockey Championships
- 2007 World Junior Ice Hockey Championships
- 2007 IIHF World U18 Championships
