= 2014 World Ice Hockey Championships =

2014 World Ice Hockey Championships may refer to:

- 2014 Men's World Ice Hockey Championships
- 2014 Women's World Ice Hockey Championships (Division II and III only)
- 2014 World Junior Ice Hockey Championships
- 2014 IIHF World U18 Championships
