= 2013 World Ice Hockey Championships =

2013 World Ice Hockey Championships may refer to:

- 2013 Men's World Ice Hockey Championships
- 2013 IIHF Women's World Championship
- 2013 World Junior Ice Hockey Championships
- 2013 IIHF World U18 Championships
