= 2011 World Ice Hockey Championships =

2011 World Ice Hockey Championships may refer to:

- 2011 Men's World Ice Hockey Championships
- 2011 Women's World Ice Hockey Championships
- 2011 World Junior Ice Hockey Championships
- 2011 IIHF World U18 Championships
