= 2010 World Ice Hockey Championships =

2010 World Ice Hockey Championships may refer to:

- 2010 Men's World Ice Hockey Championships
- 2010 World Junior Ice Hockey Championships
- 2010 IIHF World U18 Championships
