= 2010 Men's Ice Hockey World Championships =

2010 edition of the Men's World Ice Hockey Championships

The 2010 Men's Ice Hockey World Championships was the 74th such event hosted by the International Ice Hockey Federation. Teams representing 48 countries participated in four levels of competition. The competition also served as qualifications for division placements in the 2011 competition.

The 2010 IIHF World Championship was held in Germany between 7 May and 23 May 2010 with events being held in Gelsenkirchen, Mannheim and Cologne.

== Championship ==
The Championship took place between sixteen teams from 7 to 23 May 2010. Germany hosted the event with games being played in Gelsenkirchen, Mannheim and Cologne.

Championship – Final Standings

1. Czech Republic
2. Russia
3. Sweden
4. Germany
5. Switzerland
6. Finland
7. Canada
8. Denmark
9. Norway
10. Belarus
11. Latvia
12. Slovakia
13. United States
14. France
15. Italy — relegated to Division I for 2011
16. Kazakhstan — relegated to Division I for 2011

== Division I ==
Division I was held from 17 to 25 April 2010. Participants in this tournament were separated into two separate tournament groups. The Group A tournament was contested in Tilburg, Netherlands. Group B's games were played in Ljubljana, Slovenia.

Group A

1. Austria — promoted to Championship pool for 2011
2. Ukraine
3. Japan
4. Netherlands
5. Lithuania
6. Serbia — relegated to Division II for 2011

Group B

1. Slovenia — promoted to Championship pool for 2011
2. Hungary
3. Poland
4. Great Britain
5. South Korea
6. Croatia — relegated to Division II for 2011

== Division II ==
Division II was held 10 to 17 April 2010. Participants in this tournament were separated into two separate tournament groups. The Group A tournament was held in Mexico City, Mexico. Group B's games were played in Narva, Estonia.

Group A

1. Spain — promoted to Division I for 2011
2. Australia
3. Belgium
4. Bulgaria
5. Mexico
6. Turkey — relegated to Division III for 2011

Group B

1. Estonia — promoted to Division I for 2011
2. Romania
3. Iceland
4. New Zealand
5. China
6. Israel — relegated to Division III for 2011

== Division III ==
Division III was held 14 to 18 April 2010. Participants in this tournament were separated into two separate tournament groups. The Group A tournament was held in Kockelscheuer, Luxembourg. Group B's games were played in Yerevan, Armenia.

Group A

1. Ireland — promoted to Division II for 2011
2. Greece
3. Luxembourg
4. United Arab Emirates

Group B

1. North Korea — promoted to Division II for 2011
2. South Africa
3. Mongolia
- Armenia — disqualified
