= 2016 Men's Ice Hockey World Championships =

2016 edition of the Men's World Ice Hockey Championships

The 2016 Men's Ice Hockey World Championships was the 80th such event hosted by the International Ice Hockey Federation. Teams participated at several levels of competition. The competition also served as qualifications for division placements in the 2017 competition.

== Championship (top division) ==
The tournament took place in Russia from 6 May to 22 May 2016.

Pos	Grp	Team	Pld	W	OTW	OTL	L	GF	GA	GD	Pts	Final result
1	B	Canada	10	9	0	0	1	46	11	+35	27	Champions
2	B	Finland	10	9	0	0	1	37	10	+27	27	Runners-up
3	A	Russia (H)	10	8	0	0	2	44	16	+28	24	Third place
4	B	United States	10	3	1	1	5	29	30	−1	12	Fourth place
5	A	Czech Republic	8	5	1	2	0	28	14	+14	19	Eliminated in Quarter-finals
6	A	Sweden	8	3	2	0	3	23	24	−1	13	Eliminated in Quarter-finals
7	B	Germany	8	4	0	1	3	23	24	−1	13	Eliminated in Quarter-finals
8	A	Denmark	8	2	2	1	3	18	27	−9	11	Eliminated in Quarter-finals
9	B	Slovakia	7	2	1	0	4	15	23	−8	8	Eliminated in Group stage
10	A	Norway	7	2	1	0	4	13	22	−9	8	Eliminated in Group stage
11	A	Switzerland	7	1	1	3	2	20	26	−6	8	Eliminated in Group stage
12	B	Belarus	7	2	0	0	5	16	32	−16	6	Eliminated in Group stage
13	A	Latvia	7	1	0	3	3	13	22	−9	6	Eliminated in Group stage
14	B	France	7	1	1	0	5	11	23	−12	5	Eliminated in Group stage
15	B	Hungary	7	1	0	0	6	12	31	−19	3	2017 IIHF World Championship Division I
16	A	Kazakhstan	7	0	1	0	6	15	28	−13	2	2017 IIHF World Championship Division I

Source: IIHF.com
(H) Host

== Division I ==
Group A was held in Katowice, Poland from 23–29 April 2016 and Group B in Zagreb, Croatia from 17–23 April 2016.

=== Group A ===
Pos	Team	Pld	W	OTW	OTL	L	GF	GA	GD	Pts	Qualification or relegation
1	Slovenia (P)	5	4	0	0	1	18	8	+10	12	Promoted to the 2017 Top division
2	Italy (P)	5	3	0	0	2	11	10	+1	9 (Note: Italy 3–1 Poland)	Promoted to the 2017 Top division
3	Poland (H)	5	3	0	0	2	17	12	+5	9	
4	Austria	5	2	1	0	2	11	8	+3	8	
5	South Korea	5	2	0	1	2	11	11	0	7	
6	Japan (R)	5	0	0	0	5	7	26	−19	0	Relegation to Division I B

Source: IIHF
Rules for classification: 1) points; 2) head-to-head points; 3) head-to-head goal difference; 4) head-to-head number of goals scored; 5) result against closest best-ranked team outside tied teams; 6) result against second-best ranked team outside tied teams; 7) seeding before tournament.
(H) Host; (P) Promoted; (R) Relegated

=== Group B ===
Pos	Team	Pld	W	OTW	OTL	L	GF	GA	GD	Pts	Qualification or relegation
1	Ukraine (P)	5	4	0	0	1	20	6	+14	12	Promoted to Division I A
2	Great Britain	5	3	1	0	1	23	7	+16	11	
3	Lithuania	5	3	0	1	1	15	14	+1	10	
4	Croatia (H)	5	2	1	0	2	21	17	+4	8	
5	Estonia	5	1	0	1	3	12	23	−11	4	
6	Romania (R)	5	0	0	0	5	8	32	−24	0	Relegation to Division II A

Source: IIHF
Rules for classification: 1) points; 2) head-to-head points; 3) head-to-head goal difference; 4) head-to-head number of goals scored; 5) result against closest best-ranked team outside tied teams; 6) result against second-best ranked team outside tied teams; 7) seeding before tournament.
(H) Host; (P) Promoted; (R) Relegated

== Division II ==
Group A was held in Jaca, Spain and Group B in Mexico City, Mexico from 9–15 April 2016.

=== Group A ===
Pos	Team	Pld	W	OTW	OTL	L	GF	GA	GD	Pts	Qualification or relegation
1	Netherlands (P)	5	4	1	0	0	24	6	+18	14	Promoted to Division I B
2	Spain (H)	5	3	1	1	0	17	9	+8	12	
3	Belgium	5	1	2	0	2	15	18	−3	7 (Note: Belgium 4–2 Serbia)	
4	Serbia	5	2	0	1	2	16	14	+2	7	
5	Iceland	5	1	0	1	3	16	23	−7	4	
6	China (R)	5	0	0	1	4	6	24	−18	1	Relegation to Division II B

Source: IIHF
Rules for classification: 1) points; 2) head-to-head points; 3) head-to-head goal difference; 4) head-to-head number of goals scored; 5) result against closest best-ranked team outside tied teams; 6) result against second-best ranked team outside tied teams; 7) seeding before tournament.
(H) Host; (P) Promoted; (R) Relegated

=== Group B ===
Pos	Team	Pld	W	OTW	OTL	L	GF	GA	GD	Pts	Qualification or relegation
1	Australia (P)	5	4	1	0	0	58	10	+48	14	Promoted to Division II A
2	Mexico (H)	5	4	0	1	0	30	13	+17	13	
3	Israel	5	2	0	0	3	22	33	−11	6	
4	New Zealand	5	2	0	0	3	27	19	+8	6	
5	North Korea	5	2	0	0	3	24	42	−18	6	
6	Bulgaria (R)	5	0	0	0	5	8	52	−44	0	Relegation to Division III

Source: IIHF
Rules for classification: 1) points; 2) head-to-head points; 3) head-to-head goal difference; 4) head-to-head number of goals scored; 5) result against closest best-ranked team outside tied teams; 6) result against second-best ranked team outside tied teams; 7) seeding before tournament.
(H) Host; (P) Promoted; (R) Relegated

== Division III ==
The tournament was held in Istanbul, Turkey from 31 March to 6 April 2016. Prior to the start of the tournament the United Arab Emirates withdrew, leaving six teams to play. Due to eligibility violations all of Georgia's games were declared 5–0 forfeits.

Pos	Team	Pld	W	OTW	OTL	L	GF	GA	GD	Pts	Qualification or relegation
1	Turkey (H, P)	5	5	0	0	0	35	7	+28	15	Promoted to Division II B
2	South Africa	5	4	0	0	1	29	10	+19	12	
3	Luxembourg	5	3	0	0	2	29	14	+15	9	
4	Bosnia and Herzegovina	5	2	0	0	3	12	35	−23	6	
5	Hong Kong	5	1	0	0	4	12	26	−14	3	
6	Georgia	5	0	0	0	5	0	25	−25	0	

Source: IIHF
Rules for classification: 1) points; 2) head-to-head points; 3) head-to-head goal difference; 4) head-to-head number of goals scored; 5) result against closest best-ranked team outside tied teams; 6) result against second-best ranked team outside tied teams; 7) seeding before tournament.
(H) Host; (P) Promoted
