= 2015 Men's Ice Hockey World Championships =

2015 edition of the Men's World Ice Hockey Championships

The 2015 Men's Ice Hockey World Championships was the 79th such event hosted by the International Ice Hockey Federation. Teams participated at several levels of competition, which also served as qualification for division placements in the 2016 Men's Ice Hockey World Championships and to finalize seeding for 2018 Winter Olympics qualification.

== Championship ==
The top division championship took place from 1 to 17 May 2015 with the participation of sixteen teams. Czech Republic hosted the event with games played in Prague and Ostrava. Canada won the championship, defeating Russia in the final.

The IIHF's official final rankings of the tournament:

1st place, gold medalist(s)	Canada
2nd place, silver medalist(s)	Russia
3rd place, bronze medalist(s)	United States
4	Czech Republic
5	Sweden
6	Finland
7	Belarus
8	Switzerland
9	Slovakia
10	Germany
11	Norway
12	France
13	Latvia
14	Denmark
15	Austria
16	Slovenia

Relegated to the 2016 Division I

== Division I ==
=== Division I A ===
The Division I A tournament was played April 19 to 25, 2015. Ukraine was to host the tournament, with some matches in Donetsk, but withdrew in advance due to "the political tension in the country being an obstacle for foreign visitors and fans who want to visit the ice festival in Donetsk." On 18 September 2014, it was announced that the tournament would be hosted in Kraków, Poland.

Team	Pld	W	OTW	OTL	L	GF	GA	GD	Pts	Promotion or relegation
Kazakhstan	5	5	0	0	0	23	6	+17	15	Promoted to the 2016 Top Division
Hungary	5	4	0	0	1	14	11	+3	12	Promoted to the 2016 Top Division
Poland	5	2	0	0	3	9	9	0	6	
Japan	5	2	0	0	3	10	16	−6	6	
Italy	5	1	1	0	3	7	12	−5	5	
Ukraine	5	0	0	1	4	8	17	−9	1	Relegated to the 2016 Division I B

Source: IIHF

=== Division I B ===
The Division I B tournament was played in Eindhoven, Netherlands, from 13 to 19 April 2015.

Team	Pld	W	OTW	OTL	L	GF	GA	GD	Pts	Promotion or relegation
South Korea	5	4	0	0	1	30	11	+19	12	Promoted to the 2016 Division I A
Great Britain	5	3	1	0	1	13	10	+3	11	
Lithuania	5	3	0	0	2	11	12	−1	9	
Croatia	5	2	0	1	2	16	20	−4	7	
Estonia	5	1	0	0	4	10	21	−11	3	
Netherlands	5	1	0	0	4	9	15	−6	3	Relegated to the 2016 Division II A

Source: IIHF

== Division II ==
=== Division II A ===
The Division II A tournament was played in Reykjavík, Iceland, from 13 to 19 April 2015.

Team	Pld	W	OTW	OTL	L	GF	GA	GD	Pts	Promotion or relegation
Romania	5	4	1	0	0	27	11	+16	14	Promoted to the 2016 Division I B
Belgium	5	2	1	0	2	22	15	+7	8	
Serbia	5	1	1	2	1	18	22	−4	7	
Spain	5	2	0	1	2	16	20	−4	7	
Iceland	5	2	0	1	2	17	13	+4	7	
Australia	5	0	1	0	4	11	30	−19	2	Relegated to the 2016 Division II B

Source: IIHF

=== Division II B ===
The Division II B tournament was played in Cape Town, South Africa, from 13 to 19 April 2015.

Team	Pld	W	OTW	OTL	L	GF	GA	GD	Pts	Promotion or relegation
China	5	4	1	0	0	33	15	+18	14	Promoted to the 2016 Division II A
New Zealand	5	3	0	0	2	21	17	+4	9	
Mexico	5	3	0	0	2	24	15	+9	9	
Bulgaria	5	2	0	0	3	17	30	−13	6	
Israel	5	1	0	1	3	20	29	−9	4	
South Africa	5	1	0	0	4	11	20	−9	3	Relegated to the 2016 Division III

Source: IIHF

== Division III ==
The Division III tournament was played in İzmir, Turkey, from 3 to 12 April 2015.

Team	Pld	W	OTW	OTL	L	GF	GA	GD	Pts	Promotion
North Korea	6	5	1	0	0	50	9	+41	17	Promoted to the 2016 Division II B
Turkey	6	5	0	1	0	59	11	+48	16	
Luxembourg	6	4	0	0	2	39	19	+20	12	
Hong Kong	6	3	0	0	3	30	30	0	9	
Georgia	6	1	1	0	4	20	56	−36	5	
United Arab Emirates	6	1	0	1	4	14	44	−30	4	
Bosnia and Herzegovina	6	0	0	0	6	3	46	−43	0	

Source: IIHF
