= 2014 Men's Ice Hockey World Championships =

2014 edition of the Men's World Ice Hockey Championships

The 2014 Men's Ice Hockey World Championships was the 78th such event organised by the International Ice Hockey Federation. Teams participated at six levels of competition. The competition also served as qualifications for division placements in the 2015 competition.

== Controversy ==
The selection of Belarus as hosts caused great controversy and initiated the Minsk2014.No Campaign. The European Parliament called the IIHF to move the venue and demanded the release of all political prisoners as a condition to continue the Championship in Minsk.

== Championship ==
The top division championship took place with the participation of sixteen teams from 9 to 25 May 2014. Belarus hosted the event with games played in Minsk.
The IIHF's official final ranking of the tournament:

1st place, gold medalist(s)	Russia
2nd place, silver medalist(s)	Finland
3rd place, bronze medalist(s)	Sweden
4	Czech Republic
5	Canada
6	United States
7	Belarus
8	France
9	Slovakia
10	Switzerland
11	Latvia
12	Norway
13	Denmark
14	Germany
15	Italy
16	Kazakhstan

Relegated to the 2015 Division I A

== Division I ==
=== Division I A ===
The Division I A tournament was played in Goyang, South Korea, from 20 to 26 April 2014.

Team	Pld	W	OTW	OTL	L	GF	GA	GD	Pts	Promotion or relegation
Slovenia	5	4	0	0	1	15	6	+9	12	Promoted to the 2015 Top Division
Austria	5	2	2	0	1	20	14	+6	10	Promoted to the 2015 Top Division
Japan	5	3	0	1	1	14	14	0	10	
Ukraine	5	2	0	1	2	18	13	+5	7	
Hungary	5	1	1	1	2	16	18	−2	6	
South Korea	5	0	0	0	5	12	30	−18	0	Relegated to the 2015 Division I B

Source: Division I A Statistics

=== Division I B ===
The Division I B tournament was played in Vilnius, Lithuania, from 20 to 26 April 2014.

Team	Pld	W	OTW	OTL	L	GF	GA	GD	Pts	Promotion or relegation
Poland	5	4	0	0	1	21	8	+13	12	Promoted to the 2015 Division I A
Croatia	5	3	1	0	1	16	9	+7	11	
Lithuania	5	3	0	0	2	15	9	+6	9	
Great Britain	5	3	0	0	2	13	12	+1	9	
Netherlands	5	1	0	0	4	13	18	−5	3	
Romania	5	0	0	1	4	7	29	−22	1	Relegated to the 2015 Division II A

Source: Division I B Statistics

== Division II ==
=== Division II A ===
The Division II A tournament was played in Belgrade, Serbia, from 9 to 15 April 2014.

Team	Pld	W	OTW	OTL	L	GF	GA	GD	Pts	Promotion or relegation
Estonia	5	5	0	0	0	36	8	+28	15	Promoted to the 2015 Division I B
Iceland	5	1	3	0	1	18	15	+3	9	
Serbia	5	2	0	1	2	19	23	−4	7	
Australia	5	1	0	2	2	13	14	−1	5	
Belgium	5	1	1	0	3	17	25	−8	5	
Israel	5	0	1	2	2	19	37	−18	4	Relegated to the 2015 Division II B

Source: Division II A Statistics

=== Division II B ===
The Division II B tournament was played in Jaca, Spain, from 5 to 11 April 2014.

Team	Pld	W	OTW	OTL	L	GF	GA	GD	Pts	Promotion or relegation
Spain	5	5	0	0	0	29	5	+24	15	Promoted to the 2015 Division II A
Mexico	5	4	0	0	1	23	11	+12	12	
New Zealand	5	2	1	0	2	15	18	−3	8	
China	5	1	0	1	3	14	21	−7	4	
South Africa	5	1	0	0	4	8	19	−11	3	
Turkey	5	1	0	0	4	12	27	−15	3	Relegated to the 2015 Division III

Source: Division II B Statistics

== Division III ==
The Division III tournament was played in Luxembourg City, Luxembourg, from 6 to 12 April 2014.

Team	Pld	W	OTW	OTL	L	GF	GA	GD	Pts	Promotion
Bulgaria	5	5	0	0	0	48	13	+35	15	Promoted to the 2015 Division II B
North Korea	5	4	0	0	1	54	11	+43	12	
Luxembourg	5	3	0	0	2	43	16	+27	9	
Hong Kong	5	1	1	0	3	17	27	−10	5	
United Arab Emirates	5	1	0	1	3	14	34	−20	4	
Georgia	5	0	0	0	5	3	78	−75	0	

Source: Division III Statistics

== See also ==
- 2014 IIHF Women's World Championship
- 2014 World Junior Ice Hockey Championships
- 2014 IIHF World U18 Championships
