= 2012 Men's Ice Hockey World Championships =

2012 edition of the Men's World Ice Hockey Championships

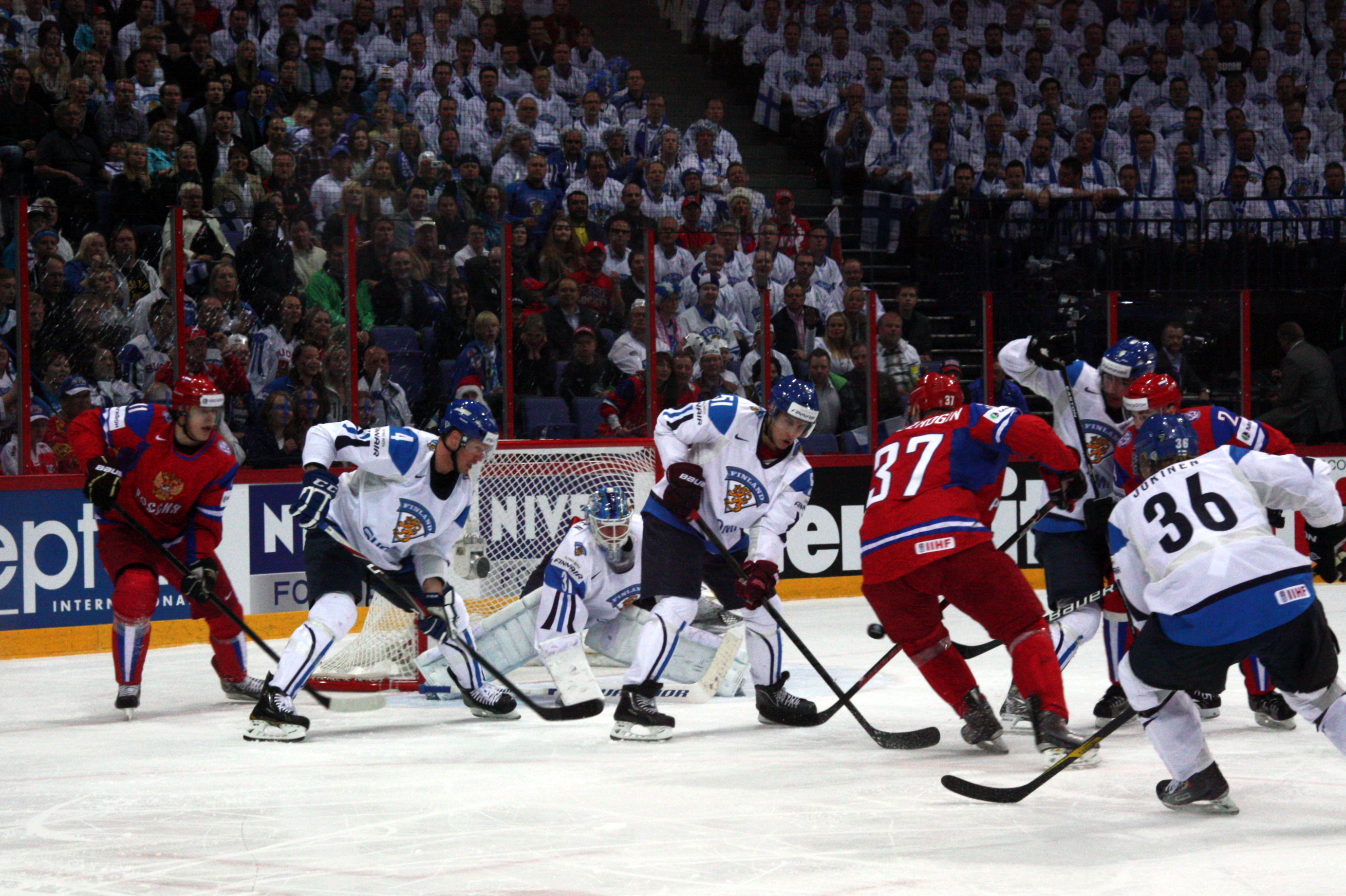

The 2012 Men's Ice Hockey World Championships were the 76th such event organized by the International Ice Hockey Federation. 46 teams representing their countries participated in six levels of competition. The competition also served as qualifications for division placements in the 2013 competition.

== Championship ==
The Championship took place between sixteen teams from 4 to 20 May 2012. Finland and Sweden hosted the event with games played in Helsinki and Stockholm.

Championship – Final Standings

1. Russia
2. Slovakia
3. Czech Republic
4. Finland
5. Canada
6. Sweden
7. United States
8. Norway
9. France
10. Latvia
11. Switzerland
12. Germany
13. Denmark
14. Belarus
15. Italy – relegated to Division I A for 2013
16. Kazakhstan – relegated to Division I A for 2013

== Division I ==
The Division I competition took place from 15 to 21 April 2012. Group A games were played in Ljubljana, Slovenia and Group B were played in Krynica-Zdrój, Poland.

Division I A – Final Standings

1. Slovenia – promoted to Championship for 2013
2. Austria – promoted to Championship for 2013
3. Hungary
4. Japan
5. Great Britain
6. Ukraine – relegated to Division I B for 2013

Division I B – Final Standings

1. South Korea – promoted to Division I A for 2013
2. Poland
3. Netherlands
4. Romania
5. Lithuania
6. Australia – relegated to Division II A for 2013

== Division II ==
The Division II competition were held in two groups. Group A games were played from 12 to 18 April 2012 in Reykjavík, Iceland and Group B were played from 2 to 8 April 2012 in Sofia, Bulgaria.

Division II A – Final Standings

1. Estonia – promoted to Division I B for 2013
2. Spain
3. Croatia
4. Iceland
5. Serbia
6. New Zealand – relegated to Division II B for 2013

Division II B – Final Standings

1. Belgium – promoted to Division II A for 2013
2. China
3. Bulgaria
4. Mexico
5. Israel
6. South Africa – relegated to Division III for 2013

== Division III ==
The Division III competition took place from 15 to 21 April 2012 in Erzurum, Turkey.

Division III – Final Standings

1. Turkey – promoted to Division II B for 2013
2. North Korea
3. Luxembourg
4. Ireland
5. Greece - relegated to Division III Q for 2013
6. Mongolia - relegated to Division III Q for 2013

== See also ==
- 2012 World Junior Ice Hockey Championships
- 2012 IIHF World U18 Championships
