= 2011 Men's Ice Hockey World Championships =

2011 edition of the Men's World Ice Hockey Championships

The 2011 Men's Ice Hockey World Championships was the 75th such event hosted by the International Ice Hockey Federation. Teams representing 46 countries participated in four levels of competition. The competition also served as qualifications for division placements in the 2012 competition. Finland won the championship with a 6–1 win in the final game against Sweden.

== Championship ==
The Championship took place between sixteen teams from 29 April to 15 May 2011. Slovakia hosted the event with games being played in Bratislava and Košice. Championship – Final Standings

1. Finland
2. Sweden
3. Czech Republic
4. Russia
5. Canada
6. Norway
7. Germany
8. United States
9. Switzerland
10. Slovakia
11. Denmark
12. France
13. Latvia
14. Belarus
15. Austria – relegated to Division I for 2012
16. Slovenia – relegated to Division I for 2012

== Division I ==
Division I competition took place 17 to 23 April 2011. Group A games were played in Budapest, Hungary and Group B was played in Kyiv, Ukraine. Prior to the start of the tournament the Japanese national team announced they would withdraw, citing the recent earthquake and tsunami. The IIHF council voted unanimously to allow Japan to maintain their seeded position in their respective tournaments for 2012, and the fifth placed team would be relegated.

Group A – Final Standings

1. Italy – promoted to Championship for 2012
2. Hungary
3. South Korea
4. Netherlands
5. Spain – relegated to Division II for 2012

Japan (withdrew from tournament)

Group B – Final Standings

1. Kazakhstan – promoted to Championship for 2012
2. Great Britain
3. Ukraine
4. Poland
5. Lithuania
6. Estonia – relegated to Division II for 2012

== Division II ==
Participants in Division II tournament were in two separate tournament groups. The Group A tournament was contested in Melbourne, Australia, from 4 to 10 April 2011. Group B's games were played in Zagreb, Croatia, from 10 to 16 April 2011. Prior to the start of the tournament, the North Korean national team announced they would withdraw, citing financial reasons. All games against them were counted as a forfeit, with a score of 5–0 for the opposing team.

Group A – Final Standings

1. Australia – promoted to Division I for 2012
2. New Zealand
3. Serbia
4. Belgium
5. Mexico
6. North Korea – relegated to Division III for 2012 (withdrew from tournament)

Group B – Final Standings

1. Romania – promoted to Division I for 2012
2. Croatia
3. Iceland
4. China
5. Bulgaria
6. Ireland – relegated to Division III for 2012

== Division III ==
Division III was held from 11 to 17 April 2011. This tournament was contested in Cape Town, South Africa. Prior to the start of the tournament, the Mongolian national team announced they would withdraw, citing financial reasons. All games against them were counted as a forfeit, with a score of 5–0 for the opposing team. Israel won all five of its games by a combined score of 57–9, and was promoted to the 2012 IIHF World Championship Division II.

Division III – Final Standings

1. Israel – promoted to Division II for 2012
2. South Africa – promoted to Division II for 2012
3. Turkey
4. Luxembourg
5. Greece
6. Mongolia (withdrew from tournament)

United Arab Emirates (withdrew from tournament)

== See also ==
- 2011 World Junior Ice Hockey Championships
- 2011 IIHF World U18 Championships
