= 2013 Men's Ice Hockey World Championships =

2013 edition of the Men's World Ice Hockey Championships

The 2013 Men's Ice Hockey World Championships were the 77th such event organised by the International Ice Hockey Federation. 48 teams representing their countries participated in seven levels of competition. The competition also served as qualifications for division placements in the 2014 competition.

== Championship ==
The Top division championship took place between sixteen teams from 3 to May 19, 2013. Sweden and Finland hosted the event with games played in Stockholm and Helsinki.
The IIHF's official final ranking of the tournament:

Gold medal	Sweden
Silver medal	Switzerland
Bronze medal	United States
4	Finland
5	Canada
6	Russia
7	Czech Republic
8	Slovakia
9	Germany
10	Norway
11	Latvia
12	Denmark
13	France
14	Belarus
15	Austria
16	Slovenia

Relegated to the 2014 Division I A

Quarterfinals
H1	Finland	4
H4	Slovakia	3
S2	Canada	2
S3	Sweden	3
S1	Switzerland	2
S4	Czech Republic	1
H2	Russia	3
H3	United States	8

Semifinals
H1	Finland	0
S3	Sweden	3
S1	Switzerland	3
H3	United States	0

Finals
S3	Sweden	5
S1	Switzerland	1
Bronze medal game
H1	Finland	2
H3	United States	3

== Division I ==
=== Division I A ===
The Division I A tournament was played in Budapest, Hungary, from 14 to 20 April 2013.

Team	Pld	W	OTW	OTL	L	GF	GA	GD	Pts	Promotion or relegation
Kazakhstan	5	4	0	0	1	18	6	+12	12	Promoted to the 2014 Top Division
Italy	5	4	0	0	1	15	6	+9	12	Promoted to the 2014 Top Division
Hungary	5	3	0	1	1	12	10	+2	10	
Japan	5	2	0	0	3	13	16	−3	6	
South Korea	5	1	1	0	3	16	19	−3	5	
Great Britain	5	0	0	0	5	5	22	−17	0	Relegated to the 2014 Division I B

Source: 2013 Division I A statistics

=== Division I B ===
The Division I B tournament was played in Donetsk, Ukraine, from 14 to 20 April 2013.

Team	Pld	W	OTW	OTL	L	GF	GA	GD	Pts	Promotion or relegation
Ukraine	5	4	1	0	0	30	7	+23	14	Promoted to the 2014 Division I A
Poland	5	4	0	0	1	22	9	+13	12	
Netherlands	5	3	0	1	1	19	15	+4	10	
Romania	5	2	0	0	3	12	24	−12	6	
Lithuania	5	1	0	0	4	16	22	−6	3	
Estonia	5	0	0	0	5	14	36	−22	0	Relegated to the 2014 Division II A

Source: 2013 Division I B statistics

== Division II ==
=== Division II A ===
The Division II A tournament was played in Zagreb, Croatia, from 14 to 20 April 2013.

Team	Pld	W	OTW	OTL	L	GF	GA	GD	Pts	Promotion or relegation
Croatia	5	5	0	0	0	27	8	+19	15	Promoted to the 2014 Division I B
Belgium	5	3	0	0	2	15	13	+2	9	
Iceland	5	2	1	0	2	16	16	0	8	
Australia	5	2	0	1	2	13	13	0	7	
Serbia	5	2	0	0	3	14	21	−7	6	
Spain	5	0	0	0	5	12	26	−14	0	Relegated to the 2014 Division II B

Source: 2013 Division II A statistics

=== Division II B ===
The Division II B tournament was played in İzmit, Turkey, from 21 to 27 April 2013.

Team	Pld	W	OTW	OTL	L	GF	GA	GD	Pts	Promotion or relegation
Israel	5	4	0	0	1	30	14	+16	12	Promoted to the 2014 Division II A
New Zealand	5	4	0	0	1	24	16	+8	12	
Mexico	5	3	1	0	1	25	18	+7	11	
China	5	2	0	0	3	20	25	−5	6	
Turkey	5	1	0	0	4	16	19	−3	3	
Bulgaria	5	0	0	1	4	23	46	−23	1	Relegated to the 2014 Division III

Source: 2013 Division II B statistics

== Division III ==
=== Qualification tournament ===
The Division III qualification tournament was played in Abu Dhabi, United Arab Emirates, from 14 to 17 October 2012.

Team	Pld	W	OTW	OTL	L	GF	GA	GD	Pts	Qualification
United Arab Emirates	3	3	0	0	0	14	3	+11	9	Advanced to the Main tournament
Greece	3	2	0	0	1	18	4	+14	6	Advanced to the Main tournament
Mongolia	3	1	0	0	2	10	8	+2	3	
Georgia	3	0	0	0	3	1	28	−27	0	

Source: 2013 Division III (Q) statistics

=== Main tournament ===
The Division III main tournament was played in Cape Town, South Africa, from 15 to 21 April 2013.

Team	Pld	W	OTW	OTL	L	GF	GA	GD	Pts	Promotion
South Africa	5	5	0	0	0	39	8	+31	15	Promoted to the 2014 Division II B
North Korea	5	4	0	0	1	20	11	+9	12	
Luxembourg	5	3	0	0	2	20	13	+7	9	
Ireland	5	2	0	0	3	18	20	−2	6	
Greece	5	1	0	0	4	11	27	−16	3	
United Arab Emirates	5	0	0	0	5	10	39	−29	0	

Source: 2013 Division III statistics

== See also ==
- 2013 World Junior Ice Hockey Championships
- 2013 IIHF World U18 Championships
