= 2007 Men's Ice Hockey World Championships =

2007 edition of the Men's World Ice Hockey Championships

Tournament details
- Host country: Russia
- Venues: 2 (in 2 host cities)
- Dates: 27 April – 13 May
- Teams: 16

Final positions
- Champions: Canada (24th title)
- Runners-up: Finland
- Third place: Russia

Tournament statistics
- Games played: 56
- Goals scored: 361 (6.45 per game)
- Attendance: 330,708 (5,906 per game)
- Scoring leader: (Sweden) Johan Davidsson (14 points)

Awards
- MVP: (Canada) Rick Nash

The 2007 Men's Ice Hockey World Championships was the 71st World Ice Hockey Championship. The competition also served as qualification for division placements in the 2008 competition. Canada won the tournament, receiving the gold medal for the 24th time.

== Championship ==
Final standings

1. Canada
2. Finland
3. Russia
4. Sweden
5. United States
6. Slovakia
7. Czech Republic
8. Switzerland
9. Germany
10. Denmark
11. Belarus
12. Italy
13. Latvia
14. Norway
15. Austria — relegated to Division I for 2008
16. Ukraine — relegated to Division I for 2008

== Division I ==
=== Group A ===
Final standings

1. France — promoted to Championship for 2008
2. Poland
3. Kazakhstan
4. Estonia
5. Netherlands
6. China — relegated to Division II for 2008

=== Group B ===
Final standings

1. Slovenia — promoted to Championship for 2008
2. Hungary
3. Japan
4. Great Britain
5. Lithuania
6. Romania — relegated to Division II for 2008

== Division II ==
=== Group A ===
Final standings

1. Croatia — promoted to Division I for 2008
2. Belgium
3. Spain
4. Serbia
5. Bulgaria
6. Turkey — relegated to Division III for 2008

=== Group B ===
Final standings

1. South Korea — promoted to Division I for 2008
2. Australia
3. Israel
4. Iceland
5. Mexico
6. North Korea — withdrew from tournament, relegated to Division III for 2008

== Division III ==
Final standings

1. New Zealand — promoted to Division II for 2008
2. Ireland — promoted to Division II for 2008
3. Luxembourg
4. South Africa
5. Mongolia — made first appearance
6. Armenia — withdrew from tournament

== See also ==
- 2007 IIHF World Championship rosters
- Juniors
- Women's
- Men's U18
