= 2005 IIHF World Championship Division II =

Tournament details
- Host countries: Croatia; Serbia and Montenegro
- Venues: 2 (in 2 host cities)
- Dates: April 4 – April 16
- Teams: 12 (two groups of 6)

The 2005 IIHF World Championship Division II was an international ice hockey tournament run by the International Ice Hockey Federation. The tournament was contested from April 4 to April 16, 2005. Participants in this tournament were separated into two separate tournament groups. The Group A tournament was contested in Zagreb, Croatia. Group B's games were played in Belgrade, Serbia and Montenegro. Croatia and Israel finished atop of Group A and Group B respectively, gaining promotion to Division I for 2006 (for Israel it was the first, and to date - only, promotion to Division I). While Turkey finished last in Group A and Iceland last in Group B and were relegated to Division III for 2006.

== Participants ==
=== Group A ===
Team	2004 Result
South Korea	Placed 6th in Division I Group B and were relegated in 2004.
Croatia	Host, placed 2nd in Division II Group A in 2004.
Australia	Placed 3rd in Division II Group A in 2004.
Bulgaria	Placed 4th in Division II Group B in 2004.
New Zealand	Placed 5th in Division II Group B in 2004.
Turkey	Placed 2nd in Division III and were promoted in 2004.

=== Group B ===
Team	2004 Result
Belgium	Placed 6th in Division I Group A and were relegated in 2004.
Serbia and Montenegro	Host, placed 2nd in Division II Group B in 2004.
North Korea	Placed 3rd in Division II Group B in 2004.
Spain	Placed 4th in Division II Group A in 2004.
Israel	Placed 5th in Division II Group A in 2004.
Iceland	Placed 1st in Division III and were promoted in 2004.

== Group A tournament ==
=== Standings ===
Promoted to Division I for 2006
Relegated to Division III for 2006

Rk	Team	GP	W	T	L	GF	GA	GDF	PTS
1	Croatia	5	5	0	0	46	6	40	10
2	Australia	5	4	0	1	34	5	29	8
3	South Korea	5	3	0	2	26	9	17	6
4	Bulgaria	5	2	0	3	22	26	−4	4
5	New Zealand	5	1	0	4	14	31	−17	2
6	Turkey	5	0	0	5	5	70	−65	0

=== Fixtures ===
All times local.

April 10, 2005; 12:30	Turkey	0–14 (0–8, 0–2, 0–4)	South Korea	Dom Sportova; Attendance: 100

Game reference

Çağıl Uyar
Levent Özbayduğan
Goalies
Kim Sung-bae
Son Ho-seung
Referee:
(Poland) Michał Szot

0 – 1	2:54 – Park U.K. (Kim K.S.)
0 – 2	3:39 – Kim K.S. (Park W.S.)
0 – 3	4:16 – Kwack (Park J.H.)
0 – 4	4:36 – Bae J.S. (Choi)
0 – 5	5:36 – Jeon (Kim M.K.)
0 – 6	13:04 – Bae (Kim H.I.)
0 – 7	16:15 – Lee (Kim M.K.)
0 – 8	19:31 – Kim H.S. (Jeon)
0 – 9	31:10 – Choi (Bae, H.I. Kim) (PP)
0 – 10	35:57 – Bae (Kim H.I.)
0 – 11	46:07 – Choi (Bae)
0 – 12	47:51 – Kim H.S. (Kim K.H.)
0 – 13	51:30 – Bae (Kim H.I.)
0 – 14	59:49 – Jeon (Kim K.S.)

10 min
Penalties
6 min
8
Shots
60

April 10, 2005; 16:00	New Zealand	0–4 (0–1, 0–2, 0–1)	Australia	Dom Sportova; Attendance: 100

Game reference

Mike Parsons
Goalies
Stuart Denman
Referee:
(Belarus) Sergei Bervenski

0 – 1	17:12 – Sekura (Oddy)
0 – 2	22:30 – Webster (Matus)
0 – 3	24:09 – Hughes
0 – 4	51:06 – Oddy (Matus)

8 min
Penalties
28 min
8
Shots
64

April 10, 2005; 20:00	Bulgaria	1–9 (0–3, 0–3, 1–3)	Croatia	Dom Sportova; Attendance: 2000

Game reference

Konstantin Mihailov
Goalies
Vanja Belić
Referee:
(Japan) Koji Yamada

	0 – 1	9:05 – Jačmenjak (Piragić)
	0 – 2	12:54 – Grozaj (Gojanović)
	0 – 3	16:44 – Glavota (Mlađenović, Žibret)
	0 – 4	25:32 – Grozaj (Glavota) (PP)
	0 – 5	28:27 – Švigir (Mlađenović)
	0 – 6	28:49 – Glavota (Smojver)
	0 – 7	43:48 – Plahutar (Jačmenjak)
	0 – 8	45:30 – Belić (Mlađenović, Švigir)
51:17 – Batchvarov	1 – 8
	1 – 9	58:56 – Grozaj

22 min
Penalties
2 min
20
Shots
51

April 11, 2005; 12:30	Australia	20–1 (10–0, 6–0, 4–1)	Turkey	Dom Sportova; Attendance: 80

Game reference

Matthew Ezzy
Goalies
Levent Özbayduğan
Çağıl Uyar
Referee:
(Belgium) Sven Bergman

4:08 – B. Thilthorpe (Rubes, White)	1 – 0
6:28 – Rubes (Brlecic, White)	2 – 0
7:22 – Walsh (Oddy, Sekura) (PP)	3 – 0
8:15 – Rubes (Brlecic, White)	4 – 0
10:11 – B. Thilthorpe (Hughes)	5 – 0
11:13 – Oddy (Walsh, Rummukainen) (PP)	6 – 0
14:52 – L. Thilthorpe	7 – 0
16:30 – Foll (Walsh, Sekura) (PP)	8 – 0
17:52 – Oddy (White) (PP)	9 – 0
18:14 – Walsh (Sekura, Oddy) (PP)	10 – 0
20:44 – Oddy (Walsh, Foll) (PP)	11 – 0
21:19 – Wilson (White) (PP)	12 – 0
21:49 – B. Thilthorpe (D'jamirze, Hughes)	13 – 0
24:42 – Webster (Brlecic)	14 – 0
32:49 – Oddy (Walsh, Rummukainen) (PP)	15 – 0
33:40 – Oddy (Sekura, Rummukainen)	16 – 0
43:10 – B. Thilthorpe (Brlecic, White)	17 – 0
46:26 – Rubes (Brlecic, Webster)	18 – 0
54:04 – D'jamirze (SH)	19 – 0
	19 – 1	57:03 – Eroğlu (Çıplak, Coşkun) (PP)
57:19 – Walsh	20 – 1

16 min
Penalties
24 min
66
Shots
10

April 11, 2005; 16:00	South Korea	7–0 (4–0, 3–0, 0–0)	Bulgaria	Dom Sportova; Attendance: 80

Game reference

Kim Sung-bae
Son Ho-seung
Goalies
Konstantin Mihailov
Svetoslav Toshev
Referee:
(Belarus) Sergei Bervenski

9:45 – Choi	1 – 0
10:19 – Kim H.S. (Jeon, Kim K.H.)	2 – 0
14:51 – Kim H.S. (Kim K.H.)	3 – 0
17:17 – Kim H.I. (Park J.H., Kim W.J.)	4 – 0
23:26 – Kim H.I. (Park U.K.)	5 – 0
28:02 – Kim H.S. (Park S., Kim W.J.) (PP)	6 – 0
33:10 – Park W.S. (Kwack)	7 – 0

16 min
Penalties
12 min
46
Shots
16

April 11, 2005; 20:00	Croatia	14–0 (5–0, 5–0, 4–0)	New Zealand	Dom Sportova; Attendance: 1800

Game reference

Vanja Belić
Nenad Škrapec
Goalies
Gareth Livingstone
Referee:
(Poland) Michał Szot

4:32 – Grozaj (Jačmenjak)	1 – 0
10:45 – Grozaj (Plahutar, Ljubić)	2 – 0
11:51 – Smojver (Lovrenčić)	3 – 0
16:48 – Spajić (Plahutar) (PP)	4 – 0
19:07 – Plahutar (S. Belić)	5 – 0
22:07 – Smojver (Glavota)	6 – 0
23:17 – Grozaj (Plahutar)	7 – 0
25:44 – Glavota (Spajić) (PP)	8 – 0
26:03 – Ivezić (Jačmenjak)	9 – 0
29:23 – Švigir (S. Belić) (PP)	10 – 0
45:21 – Mlađenović (Jačmenjak)	11 – 0
50:23 – Mlađenović (Lovrenčić) (PP)	12 – 0
51:17 – Žibret (Švigir)	13 – 0
58:46 – Jačmenjak (Lovrenčić, Novosel)	14 – 0

20 min
Penalties
18 min
64
Shots
11

April 13, 2005; 12:30	South Korea	3–0 (2–0, 0–0, 1–0)	New Zealand	Dom Sportova; Attendance: 60

Game reference

Kim Sung-bae
Goalies
Mike Parsons
Referee:
(Japan) Koji Yamada

10:15 – Kwack (Kim G.H., Kim H.S.) (PP)	1 – 0
16:15 – Kwack (Kim M.K.) (PP)	2 – 0
46:49 – Park (Kim K.H., Kim G.H.)	3 – 0

6 min
Penalties
12 min
69
Shots
7

April 13, 2005; 16:00	Turkey	0–13 (0–1, 0–6, 0–6)	Bulgaria	Dom Sportova; Attendance: 50

Game reference

Çağıl Uyar
Goalies
Konstantin Mihailov
Svetoslav Toshev
Referee:
(Croatia) Vedran Krcelic

0 – 1	11:58 – Velev (Zinoviev) (PP)
0 – 2	21:21 – Polyzoev (PP)
0 – 3	21:55 – Yotov (Milanov)
0 – 4	23:34 – Veselinov (Batchvarov, Mihaylov)
0 – 5	28:09 – Yotov
0 – 6	31:46 – Yotov (Milanov)
0 – 7	37:43 – Batchvarov (Polyzoev) (PP)
0 – 8	40:52 – Simeonov (Stefanov)
0 – 9	48:00 – Batchvarov (Zinoviev, Yotov)
0 – 10	49:06 – Atanasov
0 – 11	55:50 – Polyzoev (Milanov)
0 – 12	56:10 – Vasilev
0 – 13	58:09 – Polyzoev (Milanov) (PP)

34 min
Penalties
22 min
26
Shots
62

April 13, 2005; 20:00	Croatia	3–2 (0–1, 1–0, 2–1)	Australia	Dom Sportova; Attendance: 3000

Game reference

Vanja Belić
Goalies
Matthew Ezzy
Referee:
(Belgium) Sven Bergman

	0 – 1	1:29 – Walsh (SH)
23:02 – Švigir	1 – 1
57:41 – Gojanović (SH)	2 – 1
	2 – 2	59:19 – Hughes (Wilson) (PP)
59:59 – Plahutar	3 – 2

26 min
Penalties
42 min
47
Shots
38

April 14, 2005; 12:30	Bulgaria	7–6 (1–2, 5–4, 1–0)	New Zealand	Dom Sportova; Attendance: 60

Game reference

Konstantin Mihailov
Goalies
Mike Parsons
Referee:
(Belgium) Sven Bergman

8:41 – Velev (Veselinov)	1 – 0
	1 – 1	9:48 – Smith (Speirs, Horo)
	1 – 2	14:33 – Horo (Speirs, Aish)
	1 – 3	22:22 – Horo (Smith, Speirs)
28:48 – Polyzoev (Batchvarov, Yotov) (PP)	2 – 3
29:52 – Yotov (Batchvarov, Polyzoev)	3 – 3
31:18 – Batchvarov (Yotov)	4 – 3
33:56 – Yotov (Batchvarov, Zinoviev)	5 – 3
34:14 – Yotov (Milanov, Polyzoev)	6 – 3
	6 – 4	35:11 – Jackson (Smith) (PP)
	6 – 5	37:38 – Down (Sam, Glass)
	6 – 6	39:08 – Speirs (Horo, Skipper)
42:16 – Batchvarov (Milanov, Yotov)	7 – 6

12 min
Penalties
8 min
33
Shots
31

April 14, 2005; 16:00	Australia	4–0 (1–0, 2–0, 1–0)	South Korea	Dom Sportova; Attendance: 200

Game reference

Matthew Ezzy
Stuart Denman
Goalies
Kim Sung-bae
Referee:
(Japan) Koji Yamada

2:05 – Walsh (Rummukainen, Foll)	1 – 0
20:42 – Oddy (Walsh, Rummukainen) (PP)	2 – 0
30:34 – Sekura (Walsh)	3 – 0
50:02 – Thilthorpe (Rummukainen, Hughes)	4 – 0

16 min
Penalties
20 min
32
Shots
39

April 14, 2005; 20:00	Croatia	15–1 (6–0, 3–1, 6–0)	Turkey	Dom Sportova; Attendance: 1300

Game reference

Vanja Belić
Nenad Škrapec
Goalies
Levent Özbayduğan
Referee:
(Belarus) Sergei Bervenski

2:30 – Grozaj (Teuber, Piragić)	1 – 0
12:52 – Glavota (Spajić) (SH)	2 – 0
16:09 – S. Belić (Žibret) (PP)	3 – 0
17:43 – Mlađenović (S. Belić)	4 – 0
18:39 – Švigir (Žibret)	5 – 0
19:55 – Novak (Spajić)	6 – 0
	6 – 1	28:24 – Coşkun (Çıplak)
31:20 – Smojver (Novak, Novosel) (SH)	7 – 1
35:09 – Smojver (Novak)	8 – 1
39:25 – Grozaj	9 – 1
40:43 – Žibret	10 – 1
41:50 – Jačmenjak (Žibret, Švigir) (PP)	11 – 1
44:13 – Ivezić (S. Belić)	12 – 1
53:33 – Ivezić (Smojver, Novosel)	13 – 1
54:14 – Grozaj	14 – 1
56:55 – Piragić (SH)	15 – 1

22 min
Penalties
30 min
64
Shots
10

April 16, 2005; 12:30	Australia	4–1 (1–1, 0–0, 3–0)	Bulgaria	Dom Sportova; Attendance: 60

Game reference

Stuart Denman
Goalies
Konstantin Mihailov
Referee:
(Poland) Michał Szot

	0 – 1	8:06 – Yotov (Batchvarov) (PP)
13:34 – Walsh (Oddy, Foll)	1 – 1
45:32 – Brlecic (D'jamirze)	2 – 1
49:03 – Hughes (Burke)	3 – 1
53:57 – Thilthorpe	4 – 1

20 min
Penalties
22 min
38
Shots
21

April 16, 2005; 16:00	New Zealand	8–3 (3–0, 2–2, 3–1)	Turkey	Dom Sportova; Attendance: 200

Game reference

Mike Parsons
Goalies
Levent Özbayduğan
Referee:
(Belarus) Sergei Bervenski

2:41 – Sam (Aish, Glass) (PP)	1 – 0
13:38 – Glass (Sam)	2 – 0
14:40 – Jackson (PP)	3 – 0
28:40 – Aish (PP)	4 – 0
	4 – 1	33:40 – Çıplak (PP)
35:59 – Smith (Speirs, Aish)	5 – 1
	5 – 2	37:53 – Öztürk (Coşkun)
	5 – 3	46:03 – Güven (Hamarat, Özmen)
47:28 – Smith (Skipper) (PP)	6 – 3
52:44 – Glass (Down, Finch) (PP)	7 – 3
58:31 – Ashwell (Glass) (PP)	8 – 3

28 min
Penalties
54 min
52
Shots
28

April 16, 2005; 20:00	South Korea	2–5 (1–2, 1–0, 0–3)	Croatia	Dom Sportova; Attendance: 4500

Game reference

Son Ho-seung
Goalies
Nenad Škrapec
Referee:
(Japan) Koji Yamada

	0 – 1	8:56 – Žibret (Mlađenović)
15:24 – Bae (Kim H.I., Choi)	1 – 1
	1 – 2	15:27 – Žibret (Mlađenović)
20:58 – Bae (Kim H.I.)	2 – 2
	2 – 3	43:12 – Mlađenović
	2 – 4	43:31 – Gojanović (Novak)
	2 – 5	59:55 – Mlađenović

14 min
Penalties
6 min
27
Shots
41

=== Scoring leaders ===
List shows the top ten skaters sorted by points, then goals.

Player	GP	G	A	Pts	+/−	PIM	POS
(Australia) Trevor Walsh	5	6	6	12	+5	24	F
(Australia) Greg Oddy	5	7	4	11	+6	12	F
(Bulgaria) Aleksey Yotov	5	7	4	11	+3	14	F
(Bulgaria) Stoian Batchvarov	5	5	5	10	+6	0	F
(Croatia) Mato Mlađenović	5	5	5	10	+12	12	F
(Croatia) Tomislav Grozaj	5	9	0	9	+11	0	F
(South Korea) Bae Joon-seo	5	6	2	8	+4	0	F
(Croatia) Veljko Žibret	5	4	4	8	+9	10	F
(Croatia) Krešimir Švigir	5	4	3	7	+11	2	F
(Bulgaria) Vasko Polyzoev	5	4	3	7	0	4	F

Source: IIHF.com

=== Leading goaltenders ===
Only the top five goaltenders, based on save percentage, who have played 40% of their team's minutes are included in this list.

Player	MIP	SOG	GA	GAA	SVS%	SO
(Australia) Stuart Denman	147:02	43	1	0.41	97.67	2
(Australia) Matthew Ezzy	152:50	81	3	1.18	96.30	2
(Croatia) Vanja Belić	252:41	97	6	1.42	93.81	1
(South Korea) Kim Sung-bae	188:46	59	4	1.27	93.22	3
(New Zealand) Mike Parsons	240:00	194	17	4.25	91.24	0

Source: IIHF.com

== Group B tournament ==
=== Standings ===
Promoted to Division I for 2006
Relegated to Division III for 2006

Rk	Team	GP	W	T	L	GF	GA	GDF	PTS
1	Israel	5	4	1	0	21	11	10	9
2	Serbia and Montenegro	5	4	0	1	30	10	20	8
3	North Korea	5	2	1	2	14	17	−3	5
4	Belgium	5	2	0	3	13	19	−6	4
5	Spain	5	1	0	4	8	15	−7	2
6	Iceland	5	1	0	4	12	26	−14	2

=== Fixtures ===
All times local.

April 4, 2005; 13:30	Israel	4–4 (0–0, 2–1, 2–3)	North Korea	Pionir Ice Hall, Belgrad; Attendance: 50

Game reference

Jevgeny Gussin
Goalies
Ri Song-Chol
Referee:
(Hungary) Béla Kovács

26:27 – Frenkel (Bochner)	1 – 0
	1 – 1	27:37 – Jang (Choe, Pak) (SH)
39:05 – Levy (Frenkel, Belo) (PP)	2 – 1
	2 – 2	48:57 – Song (Ri S.I., Ri S.C.)
	2 – 3	49:45 – Choe (Ri T.H., Jang)
51:24 – Eizenman (Spivak, Soreanu)	3 – 3
51:44 – Eizenman (Larin, Bochner)	4 – 3
	4 – 4	52:56 – Han (Yun, T.H. Ri) (SH)

12 min
Penalties
16 min
36
Shots
38

April 4, 2005; 17:00	Iceland	3–4 (1–2, 1–1, 1–1)	Belgium	Pionir Ice Hall, Belgrad; Attendance: 50

Game reference

Jón Trausti Guðmundsson
Goalies
Björn Steijlen
Referee:
(New Zealand) Peter Haxell

	0 – 1	1:01 – Hermans (Paelinck)
	0 – 2	4:44 – de Herdt (SH)
7:23 – Gíslason (Magnússon, Árnason)	1 – 2
	1 – 3	21:07 – Kustermans (Lipsonen) (PP)
27:03 – Árnason (Jakobsson, Gíslason) (PP)	2 – 3
	2 – 4	59:10 – Hermans
59:26 – Gíslason (Jakobsson, Magnússon)	3 – 4

30 min
Penalties
57 min
38
Shots
46

April 4, 2005; 20:30	Spain	0–6 (0–2, 0–1, 0–3)	Serbia and Montenegro	Pionir Ice Hall, Belgrad; Attendance: 400

Game reference

José Luis Alonso
Iñigo Zudaire
Goalies
Tihomir Zečević
Referee:
(Czech Republic) Pavel Mikula

0 – 1	4:52 – Prokec (Prokić)
0 – 2	14:28 – Milosavljević (Brestovać) (SH)
0 – 3	24:56 – Rus (SH)
0 – 4	46:20 – Prokec (Prokić)
0 – 5	48:25 – Prokić (Milinković)
0 – 6	52:15 – Prokec (Prokić)

18 min
Penalties
45 min
21
Shots
37

April 5, 2005; 13:30	Belgium	2–1 (1–0, 0–1, 1–0)	Spain	Pionir Ice Hall, Belgrad; Attendance: 50

Game reference

Björn Steijlen
Goalies
José Luis Alonso
Referee:
(Hungary) Béla Kovács

18:50 – Goris (de Herdt)	1 – 0
	1 – 1	26:12 – Calvo (Coscojuela, Saleg)
55:15 – Kustermans (Lipsonen)	2 – 1

34 min
Penalties
16 min
18
Shots
32

April 5, 2005; 17:00	Iceland	3–2 (1–2, 1–0, 1–0)	North Korea	Pionir Ice Hall, Belgrad; Attendance: 50

Game reference

Jón Trausti Guðmundsson
Goalies
Ri Song-chol
Referee:
(Czech Republic) Pavel Mikula

	0 – 1	2:35 – Jang (Ri T.H., Ho) (PP)
7:00 – Andrésson (Árnason) (PP)	1 – 1
	1 – 2	10:41 – Choe (Kim R.H.)
24:11 – Eriksson (Þormóðsson) (PP)	2 – 2
54:05 – Eriksson (Alengård)	3 – 2

22 min
Penalties
30 min
36
Shots
42

April 5, 2005; 20:30	Serbia and Montenegro	1–5 (0–2, 1–1, 0–2)	Israel	Pionir Ice Hall, Belgrad; Attendance: 500

Game reference

Tihomir Zečević
Goalies
Jevgeny Gussin
Referee:
(Ukraine) Andriy Sevruk

	0 – 1	10:25 – O. Eizenman (E. Eizenman, Frenkel)
	0 – 2	16:29 – E. Eizenman (Frenkel)
30:35 – Milosavljević (Gabrić) (PP)	1 – 2
	1 – 3	31:28 – Levy (Spivak)
	1 – 4	43:11 – O. Eizenman (Frenkel)
	1 – 5	57:39 – Levy (Lebedev)

24 min
Penalties
14 min
32
Shots
32

April 7, 2005; 13:30	Spain	5–2 (0–1, 2–0, 3–1)	Iceland	Pionir Ice Hall, Belgrad; Attendance: 50

Game reference

Iñigo Zudaire
Goalies
Jón Trausti Guðmundsson
Referee:
(Ukraine) Andriy Sevruk

	0 – 1	13:28 – Hrafnsson (Jónsson, Alengård)
32:28 – Betrán (Martín) (PP)	1 – 1
36:42 – Martin (Gracia) (PP)	2 – 1
41:26 – Saleg (Calvo)	3 – 1
	3 – 2	45:11 – Þormóðsson (Alengård)
45:56 – Gracia (Martín) (PP)	4 – 2
53:27 – Betrán (Martín) (PP)	5 – 2

18 min
Penalties
14 min
43
Shots
24

April 7, 2005; 17:00	Belgium	4–7 (2–4, 1–2, 1–1)	Israel	Pionir Ice Hall, Belgrad; Attendance: 50

Game reference

Björn Steijlen
Goalies
Jevgeny Gussin
Referee:
(Czech Republic) Pavel Mikula

	0 – 1	3:23 – Belo (A. Eizenman, O. Eizenman)
	0 – 2	5:00 – A. Eizenman (O. Eizenman) (SH)
5:48 – Peusens (Kustermans, Lipsonen) (PP)	1 – 2
	1 – 3	8:23 – O. Eizenman (A. Eizenman) (PP)
	1 – 4	15:27 – E. Eizenman (A. Eizenman, O. Eizenman) (PP)
17:02 – Kustermans (Lipsonen) (PP)	2 – 4
23:04 – Steijnen (Goris)	3 – 4
	3 – 5	25:00 – O. Eizenman
	3 – 6	27:31 – Ravniaga (Frenkel, Korotin)
	3 – 7	42:24 – A. Eizenman (SH)
44:17 – Szarzynski (Hermans, Kustermans) (PP)	4 – 7

20 min
Penalties
30 min
30
Shots
43

April 7, 2005; 20:30	Serbia and Montenegro	7–1 (1–0, 4–0, 2–1)	North Korea	Pionir Ice Hall, Belgrad; Attendance: 600

Game reference

Tihomir Zečević
Milan Luković
Goalies
Ri Song-chol
Pak Gun-hyok
Referee:
(New Zealand) Peter Haxell

7:58 – Kovačević (Prokec, I. Prokić) (PP)	1 – 0
21:15 – Kovačević (Banović) (PP)	2 – 0
28:24 – Gabrić (Ristic, Mamić) (PP)	3 – 0
33:05 – Kovačević (Prokec, I. Prokić)	4 – 0
38:18 – Pribakovic (Prokec)	5 – 0
40:43 – M. Prokić (Prokec, I. Prokić)	6 – 0
41:12 – M. Prokić (Mamić, Milosavljević)	7 – 0
	7 – 1	59:59 – Jang (Han)

22 min
Penalties
53 min
54
Shots
19

April 8, 2005; 13:30	North Korea	3–1 (0–0, 1–0, 2–1)	Belgium	Pionir Ice Hall, Belgrad; Attendance: 20

Game reference

Ri Song-chol
Goalies
Björn Steijlen
Referee:
(Ukraine) Andriy Sevruk

26:20 – Ri S.C. (PP)	1 – 0
46:52 – Kim K.I.	2 – 0
50:31 – Song (Ho, Kim K.I.) (PP)	3 – 0
	3 – 1	52:31 – Hermans (Verschaeren)

16 min
Penalties
44 min
36
Shots
19

April 8, 2005; 17:00	Spain	0–1 (0–0, 0–0, 0–1)	Israel	Pionir Ice Hall, Belgrad; Attendance: 50

Game reference
José Luis Alonso	Goalies	Jevgeny Gussin	Referee: (New Zealand) Peter Haxell
0–1 / 56:22 – Eizenman (Frenkel, Bochner)			Referee: (New Zealand) Peter Haxell
12 min	Penalties	12 min	Referee: (New Zealand) Peter Haxell
35	Shots	27	Referee: (New Zealand) Peter Haxell

April 8, 2005; 20:30	Iceland	2–11 (0–6, 2–3, 0–2)	Serbia and Montenegro	Pionir Ice Hall, Belgrad; Attendance: 700

Game reference

Birgir Örn Sveinsson
Goalies
Tihomir Zečević
Milan Luković
Referee:
(Hungary) Béla Kovács

	0 – 1	2:23 – I. Prokić (Mamić)
	0 – 2	8:22 – Prokec (I. Prokić, Mamić)
	0 – 3	10:36 – Prokec (I. Prokić, U. Banović) (PP)
	0 – 4	12:30 – Rus (N. Banović, Kovačević)
	0 – 5	13:24 – M. Prokić (Kovačević, Mamić)
	0 – 6	18:44 – Milosavljević (M. Prokić, Pajić)
	0 – 7	22:21 – N. Banović (Rus, U. Banović)
23:31 – Gíslason (Magnússon) (SH)	1 – 7
	1 – 8	24:25 – Janković (N. Banović, Rus) (PP)
28:57 – Rúnarsson	2 – 8
	2 – 9	35:06 – Kovačević (I. Prokić, Prokec)
	2 – 10	44:12 – Mamić (M. Prokić, Milosavljević) (PP)
	2 – 11	49:06 – M. Prokić (Pajić, Mamić)

22 min
Penalties
30 min
17
Shots
54

April 10, 2005; 13:30	Israel	4–2 (0–0, 2–0, 2–2)	Iceland	Pionir Ice Hall, Belgrad; Attendance: 50

Game reference

Jevgeny Gussin
Goalies
Jón Trausti Guðmundsson
Referee:
(New Zealand) Peter Haxell

29:28 – A. Eizenman (O. Eizenman) (PP)	1 – 0
31:56 – O. Eizenman (Frenkel, Belo) (PP)	2 – 0
	2 – 1	42:35 – Alengård (Ericsson) (PP)
53:59 – O. Eizenman (Soreanu, Frenkel)	3 – 1
55:04 – O. Eizenman (Frenkel, Soreanu)	4 – 1
	4 – 2	57:44 – Jakobsson (Andrésson, Ericsson)

18 min
Penalties
22 min
55
Shots
30

April 10, 2005; 17:00	North Korea	4–2 (2–2, 0–0, 2–0)	Spain	Pionir Ice Hall, Belgrad; Attendance: 70

Game reference

Ri Song-chol
Goalies
José Luis Alonso
Referee:
(Ukraine) Andriy Sevruk

	0 – 1	2:57 – Gracia (Valle)
	0 – 2	3:39 – Gracia (Baldris, Martín)
11:15 – Ri S.I. (Kim K.H.)	1 – 2
16:52 – Ri P.I. (Ri T.W.)	2 – 2
40:09 – Ri S.I.	3 – 2
56:08 – Choe (Ri T.W., Jang)	4 – 2

16 min
Penalties
16 min
26
Shots
26

April 10, 2005; 20:30	Belgium	2–5 (2–2, 0–2, 0–1)	Serbia and Montenegro	Pionir Ice Hall, Belgrad; Attendance: 1000

Game reference

Björn Steijlen
Goalies
Tihomir Zečević
Referee:
(Czech Republic) Pavel Mikula

	0 – 1	5:55 – Mamić (Banović) (PP)
7:53 – Steijnen (Morgan)	1 – 1
	1 – 2	14:17 – Milinković (Prokić) (PP)
18:16 – de Herdt (Mertens, Van Buren)	2 – 2
	2 – 3	23:02 – N. Banović (Mamić, Gabrić)
	2 – 4	36:21 – Milinković (Prokić, Prokec) (PP)
	2 – 5	45:23 – Milinković (Janković)

24 min
Penalties
24 min
42
Shots
56

=== Scoring leaders ===
List shows the top ten skaters sorted by points, then goals.

Player	GP	G	A	Pts	+/−	PIM	POS
(Israel) Oren Eizenman	5	10	4	14	+11	6	F
(Serbia and Montenegro) Ivan Prokić	5	2	11	13	+5	22	F
(Serbia and Montenegro) Čaba Prokec	5	5	6	11	+6	0	F
(Israel) Sergey Frenkel	5	1	9	10	+6	8	F
(Serbia and Montenegro) Branko Mamić	5	2	7	9	+4	16	D
(Serbia and Montenegro) Marko Kovačević	5	4	2	6	+6	22	F
(Serbia and Montenegro) Marko Prokić	5	4	2	6	+3	41	F
(Israel) Alon Eizenman	3	3	3	6	+5	4	F
(Serbia and Montenegro) Predrag Milosavljević	5	3	2	5	0	2	F
(North Korea) Jang Myong-jin	5	3	2	5	−1	4	F

Source: IIHF.com

=== Leading goaltenders ===
Only the top five goaltenders, based on save percentage, who have played 40% of their team's minutes are included in this list.

Player	MIP	SOG	GA	GAA	SVS%	SO
(Israel) Jevgeny Gussin	300:00	165	11	2.20	93.33	1
(Serbia and Montenegro) Tihomir Zečević	271:26	122	9	1.99	92.62	2
(Iceland) Jón Trausti Guðmundsson	240:00	186	15	3.75	91.94	0
(Belgium) Björn Steijlen	300:00	205	19	3.80	90.73	0
(North Korea) Ri Song-chol	280:00	154	15	3.21	90.26	0

Source: IIHF.com
