= 1996 Men's Ice Hockey World Championships =

1996 edition of the Men's World Ice Hockey Championships

Tournament details
- Host country: Austria
- Venue: 1 (in 1 host city)
- Dates: 21 April – 5 May
- Teams: 12

Final positions
- Champions: Czech Republic (1st title)
- Runners-up: Canada
- Third place: United States
- Fourth place: Russia

Tournament statistics
- Games played: 40
- Goals scored: 249 (6.23 per game)
- Attendance: 186,830 (4,671 per game)
- Scoring leader: (Canada) Yanic Perreault 9 points

The 1996 Men's Ice Hockey World Championships was the 60th such event sanctioned by the International Ice Hockey Federation (IIHF). Teams representing 36 countries participated in several levels of competition, with Slovakia making their first appearance in the top Champions Group A, in their fourth tournament since the dissolution of Czechoslovakia and the formation of the separate Czech Republic and Slovakia men's national ice hockey teams. The competition also served as qualifications for group placements in the 1997 competition.

The top Championship Group A tournament took place in Austria from 21 April to 5 May 1996, with all games played in Vienna. Twelve teams took part, with the first round split into two groups of six, with the first four from each group advancing to the quarter-finals. The Czech Republic beat Canada in the final to become World Champions for the first time. The final game was tied at two apiece before Martin Procházka scored with nineteen seconds left, followed by an empty net goal to seal the victory. In the bronze medal game, Brian Rolston scored at 4:48 of overtime to win the first medal in 34 years for team USA. The Russians, competing in their fifth tournament as an independent country after the dissolution of the Soviet Union, did not lose a game in regulation time in the entire tournament, but finished fourth.

== World Championship Group A (Austria) ==
=== Group 1 ===
Pos	Team	Pld	W	D	L	GF	GA	GD	Pts
1	Russia	5	5	0	0	23	8	+15	10
2	United States	5	3	0	2	15	14	+1	6
3	Canada	5	2	1	2	17	15	+2	5
4	Germany	5	2	0	3	12	11	+1	4
5	Slovakia	5	1	1	3	13	16	−3	3
6	Austria	5	1	0	4	3	19	−16	2

21 April	Germany	1–2	Russia

21 April	Canada	3–3	Slovakia

22 April	Austria	1–5	United States

22 April	Russia	6–2	Slovakia

23 April	United States	4–2	Germany

23 April	Austria	0–4	Canada

24 April	Germany	5–1	Canada

25 April	Austria	2–1	Slovakia

25 April	United States	1–3	Russia

26 April	Austria	0–3	Germany

26 April	Russia	6–4	Canada

27 April	United States	4–3	Slovakia

28 April	Austria	0–6	Russia

28 April	Canada	5–1	United States

29 April	Slovakia	4–1	Germany

=== Group 2 ===
Pos	Team	Pld	W	D	L	GF	GA	GD	Pts
1	Czech Republic	5	4	1	0	27	12	+15	9
2	Finland	5	2	2	1	23	15	+8	6
3	Sweden	5	2	2	1	14	12	+2	6
4	Italy	5	2	1	2	20	26	−6	5
5	Norway	5	1	2	2	6	11	−5	4
6	France	5	0	0	5	12	26	−14	0

21 April	Czech Republic	3–1	Sweden

21 April	Finland	1–1	Norway

22 April	France	5–6	Italy

23 April	Italy	4–0	Norway

23 April	Finland	2–4	Czech Republic

24 April	Sweden	2–1	France

24 April	Norway	2–2	Czech Republic

25 April	France	3–6	Finland

25 April	Sweden	3–3	Italy

26 April	Italy	2–9	Finland

27 April	Czech Republic	9–2	France

27 April	Sweden	3–0	Norway

28 April	Italy	5–9	Czech Republic

28 April	Finland	5–5	Sweden

29 April	Norway	3–1	France

=== Playoff round ===
Quarterfinals
30 April
United States	3
Sweden	2
1 May
Czech Republic	6
Germany	1
30 April
Finland	1
Canada	3
1 May
Russia	5
Italy	2

Semifinals
3 May
United States	0
Czech Republic	5
3 May
Canada (GWS)	3
Russia	2

Final
5 May
Czech Republic	4
Canada	2
Third place
4 May
Russia	3
United States (OT)	4

=== Quarterfinals ===
30 April	United States	3–2	Sweden

30 April	Finland	1–3	Canada

1 May	Russia	5–2	Italy

1 May	Czech Republic	6–1	Germany

=== Consolation round 11–12 place ===
1 May	Austria	3–6	France

2 May	Austria	3–6	France

Austria was relegated to Group B.

=== Semifinals ===
3 May	United States	0–5	Czech Republic

3 May	Canada	3–2 (GWS)	Russia

=== Match for third place ===
4 May	Russia	3–4 (OT)	United States

=== Final ===
5 May; 15:00	Czech Republic	4–2 (1–1, 1–1, 2–0)	Canada	Wiener Stadthalle, Wien; Attendance: 9,500

Roman Turek
Goalies
Curtis Joseph
Referee:
(Germany) Müller
Linesmen:
(Finland) Rautavuori
(Sweden) Rönnmark

	0–1	05:29 − Steve Thomas
Robert Lang – 07:49	1–1
Robert Lang – 26:02	2–1
	2–2	29:40 − Steve Thomas
Martin Procházka – 59:41	3–2
Jiří Kučera – 59:54	4–2

== World Championship Group B (Netherlands) ==
Played 10–20 April in Eindhoven. Latvia won at this level for the first time. In their final game, superb goaltending by Artūrs Irbe kept them in it, and a late tying goal by Oļegs Znaroks sealed the tournament victory. The final game had high drama for the host crowd, the Japanese and Danish teams among them. If the Netherlands were to lose to Poland, they would finish last and be relegated, a tie and Japan would be last, a win and Denmark would be last. A third period goal by Poland sealed Japan's fate.

Pos	Team	Pld	W	D	L	GF	GA	GD	Pts
13	Latvia	7	6	1	0	41	16	+25	13
14	Switzerland	7	5	1	1	37	13	+24	11
15	Belarus	7	5	0	2	29	18	+11	10
16	Great Britain	7	4	1	2	29	23	+6	9
17	Poland	7	1	2	4	18	27	−9	4
18	Denmark	7	1	1	5	14	32	−18	3 (Note: 3 head-to-head points)
19	Netherlands	7	1	1	5	12	35	−23	3 (Note: 2 head-to-head points)
20	Japan	7	0	3	4	14	30	−16	3 (Note: 1 head-to-head point)

Notes:

Latvia was promoted to Group A while Japan was relegated to Group C.

10 April	Latvia	6–5	Great Britain

10 April	Poland	3–3	Japan

10 April	Netherlands	0–3	Denmark

10 April	Switzerland	2–4	Belarus

11 April	Japan	1–6	Latvia

11 April	Great Britain	2–7	Switzerland

12 April	Denmark	3–4	Poland

12 April	Netherlands	2–3	Belarus

13 April	Latvia	5–3	Denmark

13 April	Switzerland	7–2	Japan

13 April	Great Britain	4–2	Poland

14 April	Netherlands	2–6	Great Britain

14 April	Latvia	4–1	Belarus

15 April	Denmark	1–10	Switzerland

15 April	Poland	3–6	Belarus

15 April	Japan	1–2	Netherlands

16 April	Latvia	4–2	Poland

16 April	Japan	3–3	Great Britain

17 April	Belarus	6–1	Denmark

17 April	Switzerland	5–1	Netherlands

18 April	Poland	2–5	Switzerland

18 April	Netherlands	3–15	Latvia

19 April	Belarus	7–2	Japan

19 April	Great Britain	5–1	Denmark

20 April	Belarus	2–4	Great Britain

20 April	Denmark	2–2	Japan

20 April	Switzerland	1–1	Latvia

20 April	Poland	2–2	Netherlands

== World Championship Group C (Slovenia) ==
Played 22–31 March in Jesenice and Kranj. For the fourth year in row the Kazakhs and Ukrainians met in Group C. For the first time the Kazakhs came out on top, and it was the difference in winning the tournament.

Pos	Team	Pld	W	D	L	GF	GA	GD	Pts
21	Kazakhstan	7	6	0	1	51	10	+41	12
22	Ukraine	7	6	0	1	40	13	+27	12
23	Slovenia	7	5	0	2	41	19	+22	10
24	Hungary	7	3	1	3	34	25	+9	7
25	Estonia	7	3	1	3	36	29	+7	7
26	Romania	7	3	0	4	32	27	+5	6
27	China	7	1	0	6	17	68	−51	2
28	Croatia	7	0	0	7	11	71	−60	0

Kazakhstan was promoted to Group B while Croatia was relegated to Group D.

22 March	Romania	9–2	Croatia

22 March	Estonia	13–2	China

22 March	Ukraine	4–1	Hungary

22 March	Slovenia	2–4	Kazakhstan

23 March	Hungary	2–7	Kazakhstan

23 March	Slovenia	4–1	Romania

23 March	China	2–7	Ukraine

23 March	Estonia	10–2	Croatia

25 March	Slovenia	6–3	Estonia

25 March	Ukraine	11–1	Croatia

25 March	Romania	3–5	Hungary

25 March	Kazakhstan	15–0	China

26 March	China	3–11	Romania

26 March	Kazakhstan	12–0	Croatia

26 March	Hungary	5–5	Estonia

26 March	Slovenia	2–4	Ukraine

28 March	Romania	2–3	Estonia

28 March	Croatia	4–6	China

28 March	Kazakhstan	3–2	Ukraine

28 March	Slovenia	4–3	Hungary

29 March	Ukraine	7–2	Romania

29 March	Croatia	0–10	Hungary

29 March	Estonia	0–7	Kazakhstan

29 March	Slovenia	10–2	China

31 March	Ukraine	5–2	Estonia

31 March	Slovenia	13–2	Croatia

31 March	Romania	4–3	Kazakhstan

31 March	China	2–8	Hungary

== World Championship Group D (Lithuania) ==
Played in Kaunas and Elektrenai 25–31 March. To narrow the field of the bottom tier to eight nations, two regional qualifying tournaments were used.

=== Group 1 (Australia) ===
Played 5 and 6 November 1995 in Sydney.

Pos	Team	Pld	W	D	L	GF	GA	GD	Pts
1	Australia	2	2	0	0	12	2	+10	4
2	New Zealand	2	0	0	2	2	12	−10	0

5 November 1995	Australia	6–0	New Zealand

6 November 1995	Australia	6–2	New Zealand

=== Group 2 (Israel) ===
Played 27–29 January 1996 in Metulla.

The Greek team originally won both their games, but it was later found that they had used ineligible players. Both games were declared 5–0 forfeits in favour of the opposing team.

Pos	Team	Pld	W	D	L	GF	GA	GD	Pts
1	Israel	2	2	0	0	24	0	+24	4
2	Turkey	2	1	0	1	5	19	−14	2
3	Greece	2	0	0	2	0	10	−10	0

27 January 1996	Israel	1–4; 5–0 by default	Greece

28 January 1996	Turkey	0–19; 5–0 by default	Greece

29 January 1996	Israel	19–0	Turkey

=== Group 1 ===
Pos	Team	Pld	W	D	L	GF	GA	GD	Pts
1	Yugoslavia	3	3	0	0	14	5	+9	6
2	Spain	3	1	1	1	15	6	+9	3
3	South Korea	3	1	1	1	15	10	+5	3
4	Australia	3	0	0	3	8	31	−23	0

25 March	Yugoslavia	7–1	Australia

25 March	Spain	1–1	South Korea

26 March	Spain	11–1	Australia

26 March	Yugoslavia	3–1	South Korea

27 March	South Korea	13–6	Australia

27 March	Yugoslavia	4–3	Spain

=== Group 2 ===
The Israeli team, that had qualified for the tournament after the Greek forfeits, had to forfeit its first two games because they used two Russian players who did not have the proper clearance to play.

Pos	Team	Pld	W	D	L	GF	GA	GD	Pts
1	Lithuania	3	3	0	0	19	2	+17	6
2	Belgium	3	2	0	1	10	13	−3	4
3	Bulgaria	3	1	0	2	7	6	+1	2
4	Israel	3	0	0	3	0	15	−15	0

25 March	Bulgaria	3–3; 5–0 by default	Israel

25 March	Lithuania	11–2	Belgium

26 March	Belgium	3–2	Bulgaria

26 March	Lithuania	7–2; 5–0 by default	Israel

27 March	Belgium	5–0	Israel

27 March	Lithuania	3–0	Bulgaria

=== Final Round 29–32 Place ===
Pos	Team	Pld	W	D	L	GF	GA	GD	Pts
29	Lithuania	3	3	0	0	25	4	+21	6
30	Yugoslavia	3	2	0	1	10	8	+2	4
31	Spain	3	1	0	2	10	16	−6	2
32	Belgium	3	0	0	3	5	22	−17	0

Host Lithuania won all five games to earn promotion to Group C.

29 March	Yugoslavia	5–2	Belgium

29 March	Lithuania	11–1	Spain

31 March	Spain	6–1	Belgium

31 March	Lithuania	3–1	Yugoslavia

=== Consolation round 33–36 place ===
Pos	Team	Pld	W	D	L	GF	GA	GD	Pts
33	South Korea	3	2	1	0	22	13	+9	5
34	Bulgaria	3	2	0	1	14	10	+4	4
35	Israel	3	1	1	1	10	10	0	3
36	Australia	3	0	0	3	12	25	−13	0

28 March	Bulgaria	5–4	Australia

28 March	Israel	3–3	South Korea

30 March	Israel	7–2	Australia

30 March	South Korea	6–4	Bulgaria

== Ranking and statistics ==
1996 IIHF World Championship winners

Czech Republic
1st/7th title

=== Tournament awards ===
- Best players selected by the directorate:
  - Best Goaltender: (Czech Republic) Roman Turek
  - Best Defenceman: (Russia) Alexei Zhitnik
  - Best Forward: (Canada) Yanic Perreault
- Media All-Star Team:
  - Goaltender: (Czech Republic) Roman Turek
  - Defence: (Czech Republic) Michal Sýkora, (Russia) Alexei Zhitnik
  - Forwards: (Canada) Paul Kariya, (Czech Republic) Robert Reichel, (Czech Republic) Otakar Vejvoda

=== Final standings ===
The final standings of the tournament according to IIHF:

1st place, gold medalist(s)	Czech Republic
2nd place, silver medalist(s)	Canada
3rd place, bronze medalist(s)	United States
4	Russia
5	Finland
6	Sweden
7	Italy
8	Germany
9	Norway
10	Slovakia
11	France
12	Austria

=== Scoring leaders ===
List shows the top skaters sorted by points, then goals.

Player	GP	G	A	Pts	+/−	PIM	POS
(Canada) Yanic Perreault	8	6	3	9	+4	0	F
(Czech Republic) Robert Lang	8	5	4	9	+7	2	F
(Russia) Sergei Berezin	8	4	5	9	+2	2	F
(Russia) Alexei Yashin	8	4	5	9	+4	4	F
(Canada) Travis Green	8	5	3	8	+2	8	F
(Finland) Teemu Selänne	8	5	3	8	+7	0	F
(Italy) Bruno Zarrillo	6	4	4	8	+4	4	F
(Russia) Dmitri Kvartalnov	8	4	4	8	0	4	F
(Czech Republic) Robert Reichel	8	4	4	8	+8	0	F
(Czech Republic) Pavel Patera	8	3	5	8	+1	2	F

=== Leading goaltenders ===
Only the top five goaltenders, based on save percentage, who have played 40% of their team's minutes are included in this list.

Player	MIP	GA	GAA	SVS%	SO
(Norway) Rob Schistad	240	6	1.50	.971	0
(Russia) Andrei Trefilov	310	6	1.16	.956	0
(Czech Republic) Roman Turek	480	15	1.88	.952	1
(Sweden) Boo Ahl	300	10	2.00	.942	1
(Germany) Klaus Merk	299	16	3.21	.938	1

== See also ==
- 1996 World Junior Ice Hockey Championships
