= 2000 World Ice Hockey Championships =

2000 World Ice Hockey Championships may refer to:

- 2000 Men's Ice Hockey World Championships
- 2000 IIHF Women's World Championship
- 2000 IIHF World U18 Championships
