= South Korea men's national ice hockey team =

South Korea
- Association: Korea Ice Hockey Association
- General manager: Choi Kwang-eun
- Head coach: Kim Woo-jae
- Assistants: Jo Su-Sie; Kim Bum-jin
- Captain: Kim Sang-wook
- Most games: Kim Sang-wook (173)
- Top scorer: Kim Ki-sung (72)
- Most points: Kim Sang-wook (161)
- Team colors
- IIHF code: KOR
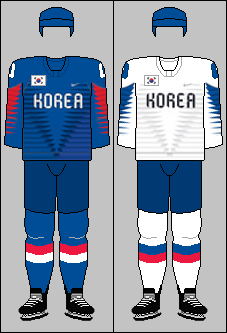

Ranking
- Current IIHF: NR (3 June 2026)
- Highest IIHF: 16 (2018)
- Lowest IIHF: 33 (2010)

First international
- Spain 7–1 South Korea (Barcelona, Spain; 16 March 1979)

Biggest win
- South Korea 44–0 Hong Kong (Perth, Australia; 14 March 1987)

Biggest defeat
- Latvia 27–0 South Korea (Bled, Slovenia; 18 March 1993)

Olympics
- Appearances: 1 (first in 2018)

IIHF World Championships
- Appearances: 40 (first in 1979)
- Best result: 16th (2018)

Asian Winter Games
- Appearances: 9 (first in 1986)
- Best result: Silver (2017); Bronze (1986, 1990, 2007, 2011, 2025)

International record (W–L–T)
- 127–230–14

- South Korea men's national ice hockey team
- Hangul: 대한민국 아이스하키 국가대표팀
- Hanja: 大韓民國 아이스하키 國家代表팀
- RR: Daehanminguk aiseuhaki gukgadaepyotim
- MR: Taehanmin'guk aisŭhak'i kukkadaep'yot'im

The South Korean national ice hockey team (Korean: 대한민국 아이스하키 국가대표팀; recognized as Korea by IIHF) is the national men's ice hockey team of the Republic of Korea (South Korea). They are currently ranked 23rd in the IIHF World Ranking and 3rd in the Asian Ranking. South Korea compete in the World Championship Division I Group B. The team's most successful campaign thus far was a second-place finish in the 2017 Division I Group A tournament and thus qualifying for the top division in 2018. They competed in their first Winter Olympics in 2018 in Pyeongchang as the host nation.

== History ==
South Korea first participated in the World Championship in 1979, playing in Pool C, the third level of the tournament. They did not return until 1982, again in Pool C, and became a regular participant in 1986. They remained at the Division I level, the second tier of the World Championship, from 2010 until 2017, when they earned a promotion to the 2018 World Championship.

Upon being named the host country for the 2018 Winter Olympics in Pyeongchang, the South Korean team began efforts to steadily improve themselves in order to be competitive with the other teams expected at the tournament, led by the efforts of Korea Ice Hockey Association president Chung Mong-won.

Several North American players playing for teams in South Korea were offered South Korean citizenship, thus allowing them to play at the Olympics. This was done to help the team perform better in the lead-up to the Olympics, which proved successful: when awarded the Olympics in 2011, the South Korean team was ranked 31st in the IIHF World Ranking, while on the eve of the Olympics had moved up to 18th. However, South Korea gradually phased out the use of naturalized players in the post-COVID-19 era.

The South Korean team is one of the powerhouses of Asian ice hockey. It is a regular participant in the Asian Winter Games, with its best result being a silver medal in 2017. In November 2024, South Korea took part in the inaugural IIHF Asia Championship and finished in third place.

== Tournament record ==
=== Olympic Games ===
- 2018 – 12th place

=== World Championship ===
Year	Finish	Rank
(Spain) 1979 Barcelona	7th in the Group C	25th
(China) 1981 Beijing	Did not participate	
(Spain) 1982 Jaca	8th in the Group C	24th
(Hungary) 1983 Budapest	Did not participate	
(France) 1985 Megève, Chamonix and Saint-Gervais	Did not participate	
(Spain) 1986 Jaca	9th in the Group C, Relegated	25th
(Australia) 1987 Perth	2nd in the Group D, Promoted	26th
(Australia) 1989 Sydney	7th in the Group C	23rd
(Hungary) 1990 Budapest	9th in the Group C	25th
(Denmark) 1991 Brøndby	8th in the Group C	24th
(United Kingdom) 1992 Hull	6th in the Group C1	26th
(Slovenia) 1993 Bled	9th in the Group C	25th
(Spain) 1994 Barcelona	10th in the Group C	30th
(South Africa) 1995 Johannesburg and Krugersdorp	13th in the Group C	33rd
(Lithuania) 1996 Kaunas and Elektrenai	5th in the Group D	33rd
(Andorra) 1997 Canillo	2nd in the Group D, Promoted	30th
(Hungary) 1998 Budapest, Székesfehérvár and Dunaújváros	7th in the Group C	31st
(Netherlands) 1999 Eindhoven and Tilburg	6th in the Group C	30th
(China) 2000 Beijing	5th in the Group C	29th
(Spain) 2001 Majadahonda	1st in Division II, Group A, Promoted	30th
(Hungary) 2002 Székesfehérvár and Dunaújváros	6th in the Division II, Group A, Relegated	27th
(South Korea) 2003 Seoul	1st in Division II, Group A, Promoted	29th
(Poland) 2004 Gdańsk	6th in the Division I, Group B, Relegated	27th
(Croatia) 2005 Zagreb	3rd in the Division II, Group A	33rd
(New Zealand) 2006 Auckland	2nd in the Division II, Group B	31st
(South Korea) 2007 Seoul	1st in the Division II, Group B, Promoted	30th
(Austria) 2008 Innsbruck	6th in the Division I, Group A, Relegated	28th
(Bulgaria) 2009 Sofia	1st in the Division II, Group B, Promoted	29th
(Slovenia) 2010 Ljubljana	5th in the Division I, Group B	25th
(Hungary) 2011 Budapest	3rd in the Division I, Group A	22nd
(Poland) 2012 Krynica	1st in the Division I, Group B, Promoted	23rd
(Hungary) 2013 Budapest	5th in the Division I, Group A	21st
(South Korea) 2014 Goyang	6th in the Division I, Group A, Relegated	22nd
(Netherlands) 2015 Eindhoven	1st in the Division I, Group B, Promoted	23rd
(Poland) 2016 Katowice	5th in the Division I, Group A	21st
(Ukraine) 2017 Kyiv	2nd in the Division I, Group A, Promoted	18th
(Denmark) 2018 Copenhagen and Herning	8th in the Group B, Relegated	16th
(Kazakhstan) 2019 Astana	3rd in Division I, Group A	19th
(Slovenia) 2020 Ljubljana	Cancelled due to the COVID-19 pandemic	
(Slovenia) 2021 Ljubljana	Cancelled due to the COVID-19 pandemic	
(Slovenia) 2022 Ljubljana	4th in Division I, Group A	20th
(United Kingdom) 2023 Nottingham	4th in Division I, Group A	20th
(Italy) 2024 Bolzano	6th in the Division I, Group A, Relegated	26th
(Estonia) 2025 Tallinn	2nd in Division I, Group B	24th
(China) 2026 Shenzhen	4th in Division I, Group B	26th

=== Asian Winter Games ===
Year	Host	Result	M	W	D	L	GF	GA	GD
1986	Japan	3	-	-	-	-	-	-	-
1990	Japan	3	-	-	-	-	-	-	-
1996	South Korea	4	-	-	-	-	-	-	-
1999	China	4	-	-	-	-	-	-	-
2003	Japan	4	-	-	-	-	-	-	-
2007	China	3	-	-	-	-	-	-	-
2011	Kazakhstan	3	-	-	-	-	-	-	-
2017	Japan	2	-	-	-	-	-	-	-
2025	China	3	8	6	1	1	64	15	+49
Total	-	9/9	40	18	1	21	220	206	+14

Key: OT = W / SO = D / Excluded Goals in SO

- 2025: JPN 3–3 KOR supposed

=== Asia Championship ===
- 2025 – 3rd place
- 2026 – 2nd place
- 2027 – 3rd place

== All-time record against other nations ==
Last match update: 14 February 2025

Team	GP	W	T	L	GF	GA
Australia	14	9	3	2	84	55
Austria	7	1	0	6	16	37
Belarus	3	1	0	2	10	19
Belgium	7	4	0	3	27	24
Bulgaria	9	4	0	5	48	53
Canada	3	0	0	3	2	18
China	24	7	2	15	71	129
Chinese Taipei	3	3	0	0	60	3
Croatia	9	2	1	6	28	29
Czech Republic	1	0	0	1	1	2
Denmark	10	1	0	9	16	86
Estonia	4	2	0	2	11	26
Finland	3	0	0	3	4	17
France	4	0	0	4	9	49
Germany	2	0	0	2	4	10
Great Britain	9	3	0	6	23	46
Hong Kong	3	3	0	0	79	1
Hungary	22	5	1	16	59	128
Iceland	2	2	0	0	24	2
Israel	4	3	1	0	23	11
Italy	14	1	0	13	20	73
Japan	37	9	1	27	75	207
Kazakhstan	27	7	0	20	54	138
Kyrgyzstan	1	1	0	0	20	0
Latvia	3	0	0	3	2	38
Lithuania	8	3	1	4	24	25
Malaysia	1	1	0	0	14	1
Mexico	4	4	0	0	48	6
Mongolia	2	2	0	0	37	2
Netherlands	9	3	0	6	39	49
New Zealand	6	6	0	0	99	5
North Korea	12	5	1	6	40	64
Norway	6	0	0	6	6	31
Poland	15	5	0	10	32	59
Romania	12	6	0	6	41	56
Russia	1	0	0	1	1	8
Yugoslavia/ Serbia and Montenegro	8	2	0	6	14	67
Slovakia	1	0	0	1	1	2
Slovenia	11	2	0	9	20	55
South Africa	5	5	0	0	46	8
Spain	14	7	3	4	54	52
Sweden	1	0	0	1	1	5
Switzerland	1	0	0	1	0	8
Thailand	1	1	0	0	10	0
Turkey	1	1	0	0	14	0
Ukraine	7	2	0	5	14	38
United States	1	0	0	1	1	13
Total	352	117	14	221	1 326	1 756

== All-time record against other clubs ==
Last match update: 11 August 2017

Team	GP	W	T	L	GF	GA
Russia Olympic Team	2	0	0	2	7	9
(Russia) Admiral Vladivostok	2	0	0	2	5	8
(Czech Republic) HC Sparta Praha	1	1	0	0	2	1
(Czech Republic) Mountfield HK	1	0	0	1	3	4
(Czech Republic) HC Dynamo Pardubice	1	0	0	1	1	4
(Czech Republic) HC Škoda Plzeň	1	0	0	1	1	2
(Czech Republic) Motor České Budějovice	1	0	0	1	1	9
Total	9	1	0	8	20	37

== See also ==
- South Korea men's national junior ice hockey team
- South Korea men's national under-18 ice hockey team
- South Korea women's national ice hockey team
