= Tupamäki =

Tupamäki is a surname. Notable people with the surname include:

- Jussi Tupamäki (born 1977), Finnish ice hockey coach
- Olavi Tupamäki (born 1944), Finnish engineer
