= Croatia men's national ice hockey team =

Croatia
- Association: Croatian Ice Hockey Federation
- Head coach: Vlastimil Wojnar
- Assistants: Marko Šakić; Miro Smerdelj
- Captain: Borna Rendulić
- Most games: Marko Tadić (82)
- Top scorer: Marko Lovrenčić (36)
- Most points: Borna Rendulić (76)
- Home stadium: Various
- Team colors
- IIHF code: CRO

Ranking
- Current IIHF: 29 (▲1) (3 June 2026)
- Highest IIHF: 25 (2018)
- Lowest IIHF: 32 (2024)

First international
- Slovakia 6–1 Croatia (Bratislava, Slovakia; 9 February 1941)

Biggest win
- Croatia 34–1 Turkey (Zagreb, Croatia; 20 November 1993)

Biggest defeat
- Slovenia 15–1 Croatia (Zagreb. Croatia; 7 November 1992); Slovenia 15–1 Croatia (Ljubljana, Slovenia; 15 April 2001)

IIHF World Championships
- Appearances: 31 (first in 1993)
- Best result: 24th (2014)

International record (W–L–T)
- 95–158–9

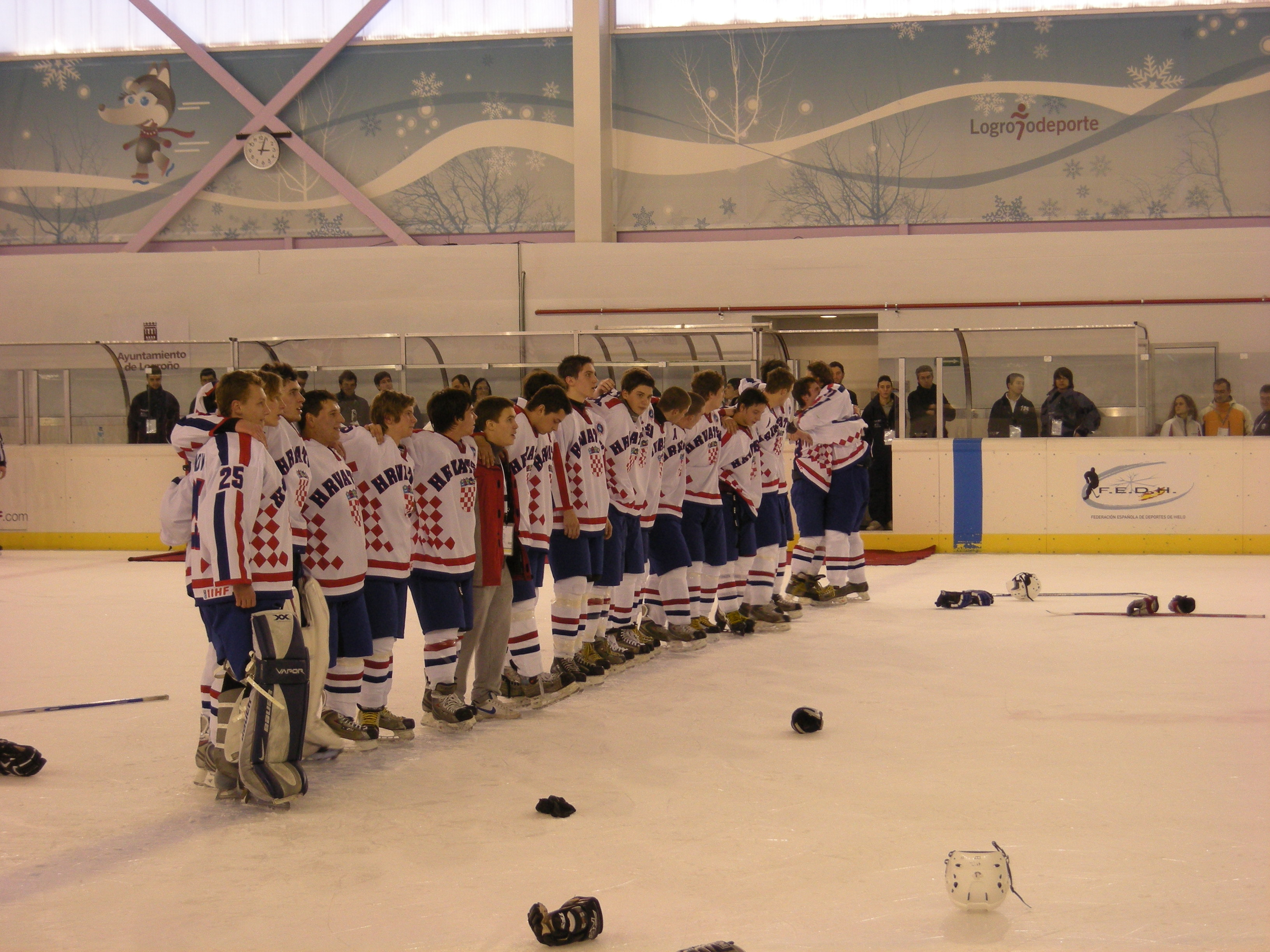
The Croatian under-20 team, who won the 2009 World Junior Ice Hockey Championships - Division II Group B

The Croatian men's national ice hockey team is the Ice hockey team that represents Croatia at International Ice Hockey Federation events. Less than a year after declaring independence from Yugoslavia, Croatia was admitted into the IIHF on May 6th, 1992. Croatia would make their international debut in 1993 when they participated in the 1993 Men's Ice Hockey World Championships, handily losing both of their games to fellow Yugoslavian breakaway state, Slovenia.

The highest division Croatia has ever reached is Division I B, which they have been in on numerous occasions, including for five straight years from 2014 to 2018. Croatia's best ever finish at the Ice Hockey World Championships was a second place finish in Division I B of the 2014 tournament (24th overall) where they missed out on promotion to Division I A by just two points as Poland finished one point ahead and had beat Croatia earlier in the tournament, giving them the tiebreaker.

== Arenas ==
Croatia has played in several arenas since they joined the IIHF in 1992. In the years they hosted IIHF World Championship events between 2003 and 2016, games took place at the Dom Sportova in Zagreb. In 2022, Croatia hosted Division II A of the World Championship with games being played at Klizalište Velesajam.

Croatia has also hosted Olympic Games qualifiers on two occasions. Group K of Preliminary qualification for the 2014 Winter Olympics in Sochi were hosted at the Dom Sportova. Croatia again hosted Olympic qualifiers in December of 2019 for the 2022 Winter Olympics in Beijing, these games were hosted at Ledena dvorana Zibel in Sisak.

== Olympic Games ==
Croatia has yet to qualify for the Olympics.

== World Championship record ==
Year	Division		Position		GP	W	D	L
Year	Tier	Div.	Ov	Div.	GP	W	D	L
1939–1992	as part of Yugoslavia							
Slovenia 1993	3	Group C	NR	–	2	0	0	2
Spain 1994	4	Group C2	31	4	7	4	0	3
South Africa 1995	4	Group C2	30	1	7	6	1	0
Slovenia 1996	3	Group C	28	8	7	0	0	7
Andorra 1997	4	Group D	29	1	6	4	1	1
Hungary 1998	3	Group C	29	5	6	1	3	2
Netherlands 1999	3	Group C	29	5	5	2	1	2
China 2000	3	Group C	27	3	4	1	1	2
Slovenia 2001	2	Div I	24	4	5	1	3	1
Netherlands 2002	2	Div I	26	5	5	1	0	4
Croatia 2003	2	Div I	27	6	5	1	4	0
Spain 2004	3	Div II	32	2	5	4	1	0
Croatia 2005	3	Div II	29	1	5	5	0	0
Estonia 2006	2	Div I	27	6	5	0	0	5
Croatia 2007	3	Div II	29	1	5	5	0	0
Japan 2008	2	Div I	25	5	5	1	0	4
Lithuania 2009	2	Div I	26	5	5	1	0	4
Slovenia 2010	2	Div I	28	6	5	0	0	5
Croatia 2011	3	Div II	31	2	5	4	0	1
Iceland 2012	4	Div II A	31	3	5	3	0	2
Croatia 2013	4	Div II A	29	1	5	5	0	0
Lithuania 2014	3	Div I B	24	2	5	4	0	1
Netherlands 2015	3	Div I B	26	4	5	2	0	3
Croatia 2016	3	Div I B	26	4	5	3	0	2
Great Britain 2017	3	Div I B	27	5	5	1	0	4
Lithuania 2018	3	Div I B	28	6	5	1	0	4
Serbia 2019	4	Div II A	30	2	5	4	0	1
Croatia 2020	4	Div II A	Cancelled due to the COVID-19 pandemic					
China 2021	4	Div II A	Cancelled due to the COVID-19 pandemic					
Croatia 2022	4	Div II A	29	3	4	1	1	2
Spain 2023	4	Div II A	31	3	5	3	0	2
Serbia 2024	4	Div II A	29	1	5	5	0	0
Estonia 2025	3	Div I B	28	6	5	0	2	3
UA Emirates 2026	4	Div II A	Cancelled due to the 2026 Iran War					

=== Division I ===
before: Group B

Gold	Silver	Bronze	Total
0	1	0	1

=== Division II ===
before: Group C, Group C1

Gold	Silver	Bronze	Total
4	3	3	10

=== Division III ===
before: Group D, Group C2

Gold	Silver	Bronze	Total
2	0	0	2

== All-time record against other nations ==
As of 2 May 2025.

Opponent	Played	Won	Drawn	Lost	GF	GA	GD
Australia	11	10	0	1	45	22	+23
Austria	2	0	0	2	2	11	-9
Belarus	3	0	0	3	3	20	-17
Belgium	7	5	0	2	42	13	+29
Bulgaria	7	6	0	1	72	16	+56
China	10	4	0	6	34	34	0
Chinese Taipei	1	1	0	0	6	1	+5
Denmark	3	0	0	3	4	24	-20
Estonia	12	4	1	7	41	61	-20
France	4	0	0	4	3	29	-26
Georgia	1	0	0	1	0	6	-6
Great Britain	9	1	0	8	13	42	-29
Hungary	24	0	1	23	30	178	-148
Iceland	5	5	0	0	37	6	+31
Ireland	1	1	0	0	21	4	+17
Italy	5	0	0	5	1	24	-23
Israel	7	7	0	0	53	7	+46
Japan	6	0	0	6	6	30	+24
Kazakhstan	4	0	0	4	4	42	+38
Lithuania	16	3	1	12	33	58	-25
Luxembourg	1	1	0	0	11	0	+11
Mexico	1	1	0	0	9	2	+7
Netherlands	17	2	1	14	36	86	-50
New Zealand	3	3	0	0	42	11	+31
Norway	4	0	0	4	5	36	-31
Poland	5	0	0	5	4	33	-29
Romania	13	5	1	7	41	52	-11
Serbia	20	13	2	5	67	42	+25
Slovakia	1	1	0	0	1	6	-5
Slovenia	18	0	0	18	18	141	-123
South Africa	1	1	0	0	11	1	+10
South Korea	10	5	1	4	31	33	-2
Spain	14	9	1	4	52	38	+14
Turkey	6	6	0	0	114	7	+107
Ukraine	9	1	0	8	7	56	-49
United Arab Emirates	1	1	0	0	4	1	+3
Total	262	95	9	158	907	1 166	-259

Biggest Losses

World Championship	Qualifications
-14 vs. Slovenia (1–15) 1993; -14 vs. Slovenia (1–15) 2001; -12 vs. Kazakhstan (0–12) 1996; -12 vs. Kazakhstan (0–12) 2002; -11 vs. Slovenia (2–13) 1996; -11 vs. Ukraine (1–11) 1996; -10 vs. Hungary (0–10) 1996; -10 vs. Hungary (3–13) 2000	-13 vs. Hungary (0–13) 2014; -7 vs. Hungary (0–7) 1998; -7 vs. Poland (0–7) 2006; -7 vs. Netherlands (3–10) 2006; -6 vs. Hungary (0–6) 1998; -6 vs. Netherlands (2–8) 2014; -6 vs. Ukraine (0–6) 2018
