= 2000 Men's Ice Hockey World Championships =

2000 edition of the Men's World Ice Hockey Championship

The 2000 Men's Ice Hockey World Championships were the 64th such event organized by the International Ice Hockey Federation. 42 teams representing their countries participated in several levels of competition. The competition also served as qualifications for division placements in the 2001 competition.

== World Championship Group A (Russia) ==
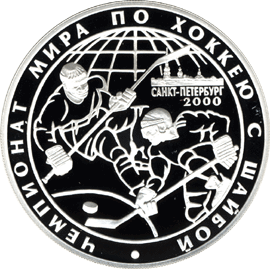

Final standings

1. Czech Republic
2. Slovakia
3. Finland
4. Canada
5. United States
6. Switzerland
7. Sweden
8. Latvia
9. Belarus
10. Norway
11. Russia
12. Italy
13. Austria
14. Ukraine
15. France — relegated to Division I for 2001
16. Japan

== World Championship Group B (Poland) ==
Played April 12–21 in Katowice and Kraków. This was the final year of the qualifying tournaments (except for the "Far East"), so it was a simple matter of the winner being promoted. This was also the final year of the traditional eight team tournament. Beginning in 2001 Group B would be renamed 'Division I' and consist of two six team divisions.

=== Final Round 17–24 Place ===
Pos	Team	Pld	W	D	L	GF	GA	GD	Pts
17	Germany	7	6	0	1	30	15	+15	12
18	Kazakhstan	7	5	0	2	30	22	+8	10
19	Great Britain	7	4	1	2	31	23	+8	9
20	Poland	7	4	1	2	28	19	+9	9
21	Denmark	7	2	2	3	22	19	+3	6
22	Estonia	7	3	0	4	19	27	−8	6
23	Slovenia	7	0	2	5	16	31	−15	2
24	Netherlands	7	0	2	5	13	33	−20	2

Source: IIHF

Germany was promoted to the 2001 IIHF World Championship. No team was relegated.

12 April	Great Britain	5-6	Estonia

12 April	Germany	7-2	Slovenia

12 April	Netherlands	3-5	Kazakhstan

12 April	Poland	3-3	Denmark

13 April	Slovenia	3-3	Great Britain

13 April	Germany	5-1	Netherlands

13 April	Estonia	0-4	Denmark

13 April	Poland	2-5	Kazakhstan

15 April	Great Britain	9-0	Netherlands

15 April	Denmark	4-2	Slovenia

15 April	Kazakhstan	4-2	Estonia

15 April	Poland	6-2	Germany

16 April	Slovenia	4-9	Kazakhstan

16 April	Estonia	2-3	Germany

16 April	Denmark	2-2	Netherlands

16 April	Poland	4-6	Great Britain

18 April	Netherlands	2-2	Slovenia

18 April	Kazakhstan	2-5	Germany

18 April	Denmark	4-5	Great Britain

18 April	Poland	5-1	Estonia

19 April	Great Britain	3-1	Kazakhstan

19 April	Germany	3-2	Denmark

19 April	Netherlands	4-5	Estonia

19 April	Poland	3-1	Slovenia

21 April	Slovenia	2-3	Estonia

21 April	Great Britain	0-5	Germany

21 April	Kazakhstan	4-3	Denmark

21 April	Poland	5-1	Netherlands

== World Championship Group C (China PR) ==
Played March 20–26 in Beijing. In 1999 Group C was disrupted because of political issues surrounding Kosovo. The IIHF chose to have no team relegated and have Yugoslavia retain their position, the result was a nine team tournament this year. With the forthcoming realignment, four nations had the opportunity to be promoted to Division I, the remaining five would participate in next year's Division II.

=== Group 1 ===
Team	Pld	W	D	L	GF	GA	GD	Pts
Hungary	2	2	0	0	16	4	+12	4
South Korea	2	1	0	1	12	12	0	2
Spain	2	0	0	2	5	17	−12	0

Source: IIHF

Hungary was promoted to Division I

20 March	Spain	2-7	Hungary

21 March	South Korea	10-3	Spain

22 March	Hungary	9-2	South Korea

=== Group 2 ===
Team	Pld	W	D	L	GF	GA	GD	Pts
Croatia	2	1	1	0	15	4	+11	3
Romania	2	1	1	0	13	5	+8	3
Bulgaria	2	0	0	2	1	20	−19	0

Source: IIHF

Croatia came back from a two goal deficit to tie Romania, and thereby clinch a promotion to Division I.

20 March	Bulgaria	1-9	Romania

21 March	Croatia	11-0	Bulgaria

22 March	Romania	4-4	Croatia

=== Group 3 ===
Team	Pld	W	D	L	GF	GA	GD	Pts
China	2	2	0	0	18	2	+16	4
Lithuania	2	1	0	1	10	8	+2	2
Yugoslavia	2	0	0	2	0	18	−18	0

Source: IIHF

China was promoted to Division I.

20 March	Yugoslavia	0-8	Lithuania

21 March	China	10-0	Yugoslavia

22 March	Lithuania	2-8	China

=== Final Round 25–27 Place ===
Pos	Team	Pld	W	D	L	GF	GA	GD	Pts
25	Hungary	2	2	0	0	16	5	+11	4
26	China	2	1	0	1	7	3	+4	2
27	Croatia	2	0	0	2	3	18	−15	0

Source: IIHF

24 March	Croatia	0-5	China

25 March	China	2-3	Hungary

26 March	Hungary	13-3	Croatia

=== Consolation Round 28–30 Place ===
Pos	Team	Pld	W	D	L	GF	GA	GD	Pts
28	Lithuania	2	1	1	0	13	8	+5	3
29	South Korea	2	1	0	1	7	11	−4	2
30	Romania	2	0	1	1	8	9	−1	1

Source: IIHF

Lithuania was promoted to Division I.

24 March	Romania	5-5	Lithuania

25 March	Lithuania	8-3	South Korea

26 March	South Korea	4-3	Romania

=== Consolation Round 31–33 Place ===
Pos	Team	Pld	W	D	L	GF	GA	GD	Pts
31	Spain	2	1	1	0	6	4	+2	3
32	Yugoslavia	2	0	2	0	4	4	0	2
33	Bulgaria	2	0	1	1	6	8	−2	1

Source: IIHF

24 March	Bulgaria	3-3	Yugoslavia

25 March	Yugoslavia	1-1	Spain

26 March	Spain	5-3	Bulgaria

== World Championship Group D (Iceland) ==
Played April 10–16 in Reykjavík. The upcoming realignment meant that seven of the nine teams moved up to "Division II" for 2001.

=== Group 1 ===
Team	Pld	W	D	L	GF	GA	GD	Pts
Israel	2	2	0	0	21	3	+18	4
Iceland	2	1	0	1	13	6	+7	2
Turkey	2	0	0	2	0	25	−25	0

Source: IIHF

Both Israel and Iceland were promoted to Division II.

10 April	Turkey	0-10	Iceland

11 April	Iceland	3-6	Israel

12 April	Israel	15-0	Turkey

=== Group 2 ===
Team	Pld	W	D	L	GF	GA	GD	Pts
Australia	2	2	0	0	17	0	+17	4
New Zealand	2	1	0	1	4	11	−7	2
Luxembourg	2	0	0	2	1	11	−10	0

Source: IIHF

Both Australia and New Zealand were promoted to Division II.

10 April	Luxembourg	0-7	Australia

11 April	New Zealand	4-1	Luxembourg

12 April	Australia	10-0	New Zealand

=== Group 3 ===
Team	Pld	W	D	L	GF	GA	GD	Pts
Belgium	2	2	0	0	15	1	+14	4
South Africa	2	1	0	1	10	14	−4	2
Mexico	2	0	0	2	4	14	−10	0

Source: IIHF

Both Belgium and South Africa were promoted to Division II.

10 April	Mexico	0-5	Belgium

11 April	South Africa	9-4	Mexico

12 April	Belgium	10-1	South Africa

=== Final Round 34–36 Place ===
Pos	Team	Pld	W	D	L	GF	GA	GD	Pts
34	Israel	2	1	1	0	10	4	+6	3
35	Belgium	2	1	1	0	8	4	+4	3
36	Australia	2	0	0	2	6	16	−10	0

Source: IIHF

14 April	Australia	3-7	Belgium

15 April	Belgium	1-1	Israel

16 April	Israel	9-3	Australia

=== Consolation Round 37–39 Place ===
Pos	Team	Pld	W	D	L	GF	GA	GD	Pts
37	South Africa	2	2	0	0	16	5	+11	4
38	Iceland	2	1	0	1	9	12	−3	2
39	New Zealand	2	0	0	2	5	13	−8	0

Source: IIHF

14 April	New Zealand	2-7	South Africa

15 April	South Africa	9-3	Iceland

16 April	Iceland	6-3	New Zealand

=== Consolation Round 40–42 Place ===
Pos	Team	Pld	W	D	L	GF	GA	GD	Pts
40	Mexico	2	2	0	0	12	3	+9	4
41	Luxembourg	2	1	0	1	8	12	−4	2
42	Turkey	2	0	0	2	7	12	−5	0

Source: IIHF

Both Luxembourg and Turkey had to stay behind in what was initially called Division II Qualification (later renamed Division III). There was no third team to play against so they both simply skipped a year and joined Division II in 2002

14 April	Luxembourg	1-7	Mexico

15 April	Mexico	5-2	Turkey

16 April	Turkey	5-7	Luxembourg

== See also ==
- Women's Championship
- World Juniors
