= Estonia men's national ice hockey team =

Men's national ice hockey team representing Estonia

Estonia
- Nickname: Pääsukesed (Swallows)
- Association: Estonian Ice Hockey Association
- General manager: Jüri Rooba
- Head coach: Petri Skriko
- Assistants: Kaupo Kaljuste; Mika Järvinen
- Captain: Robert Arrak
- Most games: Lauri Lahesalu (181)
- Top scorer: Andrei Makrov (82)
- Most points: Andrei Makrov (148)
- Home stadium: Tondiraba Ice Hall
- Team colors
- IIHF code: EST
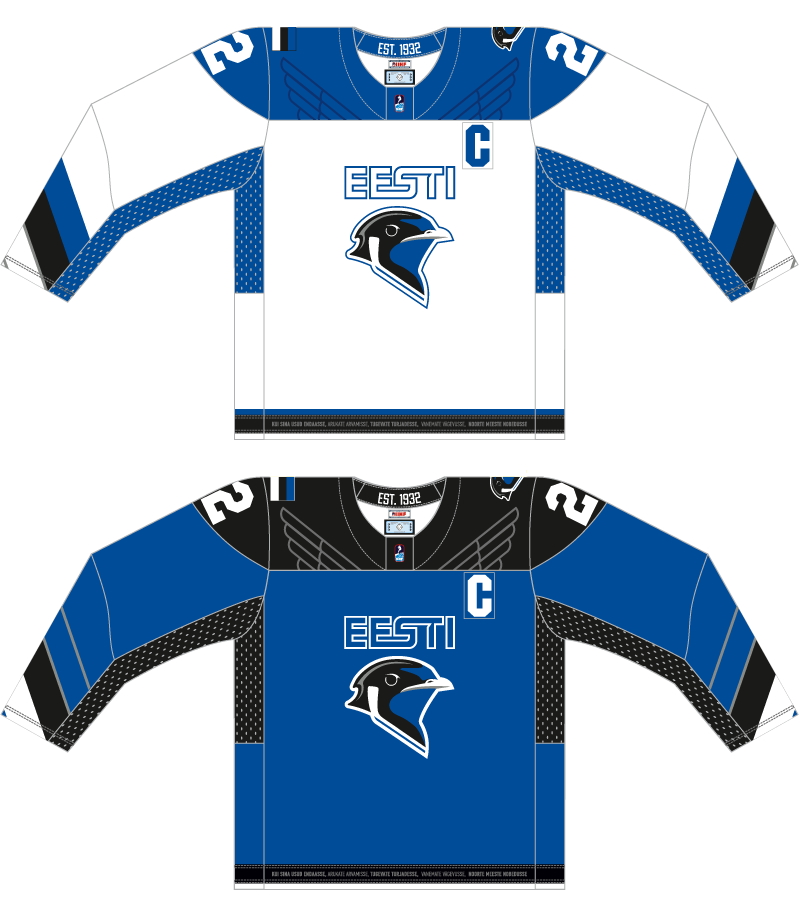

Ranking
- Current IIHF: 25 (3 June 2026)
- Highest IIHF: 23 (2007)
- Lowest IIHF: 29 (2014–15)

First international
- Finland 2–1 Estonia (Helsinki, Finland; 20 February 1937)

Biggest win
- Estonia 27–1 South Africa (Barcelona, Spain; 16 March 1994); Estonia 26–0 Bulgaria (Tallinn, Estonia; 6 November 2015)

Biggest defeat
- Slovenia 16–0 Estonia (Ljubljana, Slovenia; 21 April 2001)

IIHF World Championships
- Appearances: 31 (first in 1994)
- Best result: 19th (1998)

International record (W–L–T)
- 115–129–13

The Estonian men's national ice hockey team is the ice hockey team representing Estonia internationally. The team is controlled by the Estonian Ice Hockey Association (Estonian: Eesti Jäähokiliit), a member of the International Ice Hockey Federation.

== Competitive record ==
=== Olympic Games ===
Estonia has yet to qualify for the Olympics.

=== World Championship ===
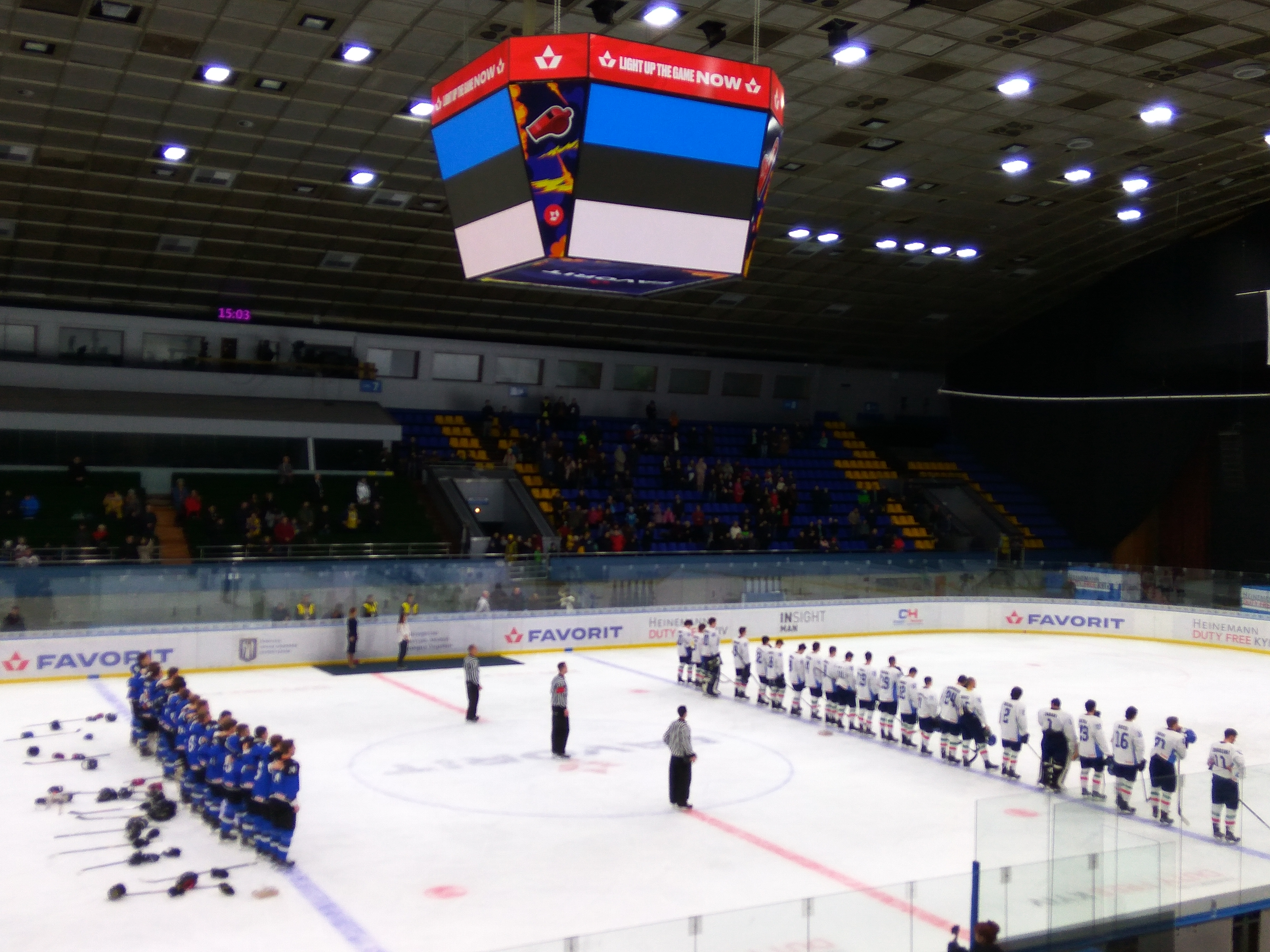
Estonia national team

Division	Championship	Coach	Captain	Finish	Rank
C1	(Latvia) 1993 Riga	Aleksandr Romantsov	–	Qualifications	2nd
C2	(Spain) 1994 Barcelona	Aleksandr Romantsov	–	Promoted ▲	1st
C1	(Bulgaria) 1995 Sofia	Aleksandr Romantsov	Vjatšeslav Kulpin	Group stage	4th in Group C1
C	(Slovenia) 1996 Jesenice	Aleksandr Romantsov	Mihhail Koršunov	Group stage	5th in Group C
C	(Estonia) 1997 Tallinn	Aleksandr Romantsov	Olle Sildre	Promoted ▲	3rd in Group C
B	(Slovenia) 1998 Ljubljana	Aleksandr Romantsov	Eduard Valiullin	Group stage	3rd in Group B
B	(Denmark) 1999 Odense	Aleksandr Romantsov	Eduard Valiullin	Group stage	6th in Group B
B	(Poland) 2000 Katowice	Aleksandr Romantsov	Eduard Valiullin	Group stage	6th in Group B
Division I	(Slovenia) 2001 Ljubljana	Aleksandr Romantsov	Igor Ossipenkov	Relegated ▼	6th in Group B
Division II	(South Africa) 2002 Cape Town	(Finland) Vesa Surenkin	Oleg Puzanov	Promoted ▲	1st in Group A
Division I	(Croatia) 2003 Zagreb	(Finland) Vesa Surenkin	Mihhail Kozlov	Group stage	3rd in Group B
Division I	(Poland) 2004 Gdańsk	Juri Tsepilov	Mihhail Kozlov	Group stage	4th in Group B
Division I	(Netherlands) 2005 Eindhoven	Juri Tsepilov	Mihhail Kozlov	Group stage	4th in Group B
Division I	(Estonia) 2006 Tallinn	Juri Tsepilov	Mihhail Kozlov	Group stage	4th in Group B
Division I	(China) 2007 Qiqihar	(Finland) Jorma Räisänen	Eduard Valiullin	Group stage	4th in Group A
Division I	(Japan) 2008 Sapporo	Rais Davletkildijev	Aleksandr Petrov	Relegated ▼	6th in Group B
Division II	(Serbia) 2009 Novi Sad	Rais Davletkildijev	Maksim Ivanov	Group stage	2nd in Group A
Division II	(Estonia) 2010 Narva	(Finland) Ismo Lehkonen	Dmitri Rodin	Promoted ▲	1st in Group B
Division I	(Ukraine) 2011 Kyiv	(Lithuania) Dmitri Medvedev	Dmitri Rodin	Relegated ▼	6th in Group B
Division II	(Iceland) 2012 Reykjavík	(Lithuania) Dmitri Medvedev	Dmitri Rodin	Promoted ▲	1st in Group A
Division I	(Ukraine) 2013 Donetsk	(Lithuania) Dmitri Medvedev	Dmitri Rodin	Relegated ▼	6th in Group B
Division II	(Serbia) 2014 Belgrade	(Finland) Sakari Pietilä	Lauri Lahesalu	Promoted ▲	1st in Group A
Division I	(Netherlands) 2015 Eindhoven	(Finland) Jussi Tupamäki	Lauri Lahesalu	Group stage	5th in Group B
Division I	(Croatia) 2016 Zagreb	(Finland) Jussi Tupamäki	Lauri Lahesalu	Group stage	5th in Group B
Division I	(United Kingdom) 2017 Belfast	(Finland) Jussi Tupamäki	Lauri Lahesalu	Group stage	4th in Group B
Division I	(Lithuania) 2018 Kaunas	(Finland) Jussi Tupamäki	Lauri Lahesalu	Group stage	3rd in Group B
Division I	(Estonia) 2019 Tallinn	(Finland) Jussi Tupamäki	Lauri Lahesalu	Group stage	4th in Group B
Division I	(Poland) 2020 Katowice	Cancelled due to the COVID-19 pandemic			
Division I	(Poland) 2021 Katowice	Cancelled due to the COVID-19 pandemic			
Division I	(Poland) 2022 Tychy	(Finland) Jussi Tupamäki	Robert Rooba	Group stage	4th in Group B
Division I	(Estonia) 2023 Tallinn	(Finland) Jussi Tupamäki	Robert Rooba	Group stage	4th in Group B
Division I	(Lithuania) 2024 Vilnius	(Finland) Petri Skriko	Robert Rooba	Group stage	3rd in Group B
Division I	(Estonia) 2025 Tallinn	(Finland) Petri Skriko	Robert Rooba	Group stage	3rd in Group B
Division I	(China) 2026 Shenzhen	(Finland) Petri Skriko	Robert Arrak	Promoted ▲	1st in Group B
Division I	(Estonia) 2027 Tallinn				Group A

== All-time record against other nations ==
As of 6 November 2025.

Opponent	Played	Won	Drawn	Lost	GF	GA	GD
Australia	2	2	0	0	25	5	+20
Austria	2	0	0	2	3	9	-6
Belarus	3	0	0	3	4	31	-27
Belgium	3	3	0	0	22	4	+18
Bulgaria	3	3	0	0	58	1	+57
China	10	7	0	3	73	27	+46
Croatia	12	7	1	4	61	41	+20
Denmark	7	1	2	4	19	26	-7
Finland	3	1	0	2	4	12	-8
France	4	1	1	2	7	19	-12
Germany	2	0	0	2	3	7	-4
Great Britain	10	3	0	7	25	49	-24
Hungary	8	2	2	4	28	37	-9
Iceland	5	5	0	0	39	5	+34
Israel	5	5	0	0	79	9	+70
Italy	3	1	0	2	4	10	-6
Japan	7	0	1	6	16	32	-16
Kazakhstan	9	1	0	8	14	48	-34
Latvia	5	0	0	5	6	32	-26
Lithuania	38	20	1	17	141	148	-7
Mexico	1	1	0	0	13	3	+10
Netherlands	14	11	1	2	60	35	+25
North Korea	1	1	0	0	16	1	+15
Norway	2	1	0	1	2	4	-2
New Zealand	2	2	0	0	36	2	+34
Poland	20	1	1	18	37	100	-63
Romania	12	7	0	5	43	50	-7
Serbia	5	4	0	1	20	12	+8
Slovenia	9	2	3	4	27	50	-23
South Africa	3	3	0	0	51	3	+48
South Korea	5	2	0	3	27	15	+11
Spain	7	6	0	1	44	15	+29
Turkey	1	1	0	0	24	0	+24
Ukraine	18	3	0	15	28	92	-64
United States	1	0	0	1	1	7	-6
Total	240	106	13	121	1 054	935	+119

== See also ==
- Estonia men's national junior ice hockey team
- Estonia men's national under-18 ice hockey team
- Estonia women's national ice hockey team
