= Ivan Prokić =

Serbian ice hockey player

- Born: April 6, 1975 (age 50) Belgrade, SFR Yugoslavia
- Position: Left wing
- Shot: Left
- Played for: HC CSKA Moscow
- National team: Yugoslavia, Serbia and Montenegro and Serbia
- Playing career: 1994–2011

Ivan Prokić (Cyrillic Иван Прокић; born April 6, 1975 in Belgrade) is professional hockey player left winger.

== Career ==
He performed for National team of Yugoslavia later National Hockey team Serbia seven times at World Hockey Championships (1995 WJC/WC, 2002, 2003, 2004, 2005 and 2006), and once on European Championship EJC (1992). Started his career as a hockey player in HK Partizan Belgrade (1989–90).

In 1991–92 becomes top scorer with most goals of Yugoslavian league. Moves toward leading team in Yugoslavian league (Serbian Hockey League) HC Red Star and stays with them 1990–91 and 1991–92 seasons. In 1992 with Yugoslavian National team becomes top scorer of European Junior Championship (EJC B league). In season 1994–95 plays for "Red Army" HC CSKA Moscow. In 1995 he was part of the Yugoslavian National Team at Hockey World Championship, taking award top goal scorer of World Championship. From 1997 to 2001 he was NCAA player with University of Wisconsin-Superior.

Season 2000/01 he was awarded NCAA First Team West All-American along with most Game Winning Goals in the nation and picked as a first draft pick by Knoxville Speed.

Season 2003/04 plays for ECHL teams:Bakersfield Condors, Fresno Falcons and Charlotte Checkers. Finally he returned to play for KHK Crvena zvezda
