= Mihail Korsunov =

Russian-born Estonian ice hockey player

- Born: February 1, 1963 (age 62) Moscow, Russian SFSR, Soviet Union
- Height: 5 ft 8 in (173 cm)
- Weight: 154 lb (70 kg; 11 st 0 lb)
- Position: Forward
- Shot: Left
- Played for: Krylya Sovetov Moscow
- National team: Estonia
- Playing career: 1981–2001

Mihail Korsunov (born February 1, 1963), also known as Mikhail Korshunov, is a Russian-born Estonian former professional ice hockey forward.

== Career ==
Born in Moscow in the Soviet Union, Korsunov played extensively in the Soviet lower leagues for HK Lokomotiv Moscow and Estonian teams Kreenholm Narva and Talleks Tallinn between 1981 and 1991, but managed to play 28 games in the Soviet Hockey League for Krylya Sovetov Moscow during the 1985–86 season, scoring three goals and two assists.

He then moved to Finland, playing in the 1. Divisioona for FoPS and Imatran Ketterä before returning to Russia in 1995, playing in the second-tier Vysshaya Liga for HC Lipetsk. He would return to Estonia a year later, playing i their top-level Meistriliiga for Kreenholm/Narva 2000 and Kohtla-Järve Central. From 1997 to 2001, Korsunov would finish his career in Finland, playing one season for KooKoo and three season with AaKoo before retiring as a player. He later became an assistant coach for KooKoo's junior teams.

Internationally, Korsunov began playing for the Soviet Union, representing them in the 1981 U18 European Junior Championship. He then switched to play for Estonia in 1994. With Estonia, he played in five Ice Hockey World Championships and helped them win two promotions, in 1994 from Pool C2 to Pool C and again to Pool B in 1997.
