= Jussi Tupamäki =

Finnish ice hockey coach (born 1977)

Jussi Tupamäki (born 30 November 1977) is a Finnish ice hockey coach, who was born in Pori. He has been the head coach of Estonia men's national ice hockey team since 2007.
