= 1997 Men's Ice Hockey World Championships =

1997 edition of the IIHF Men's World Ice Hockey Championship

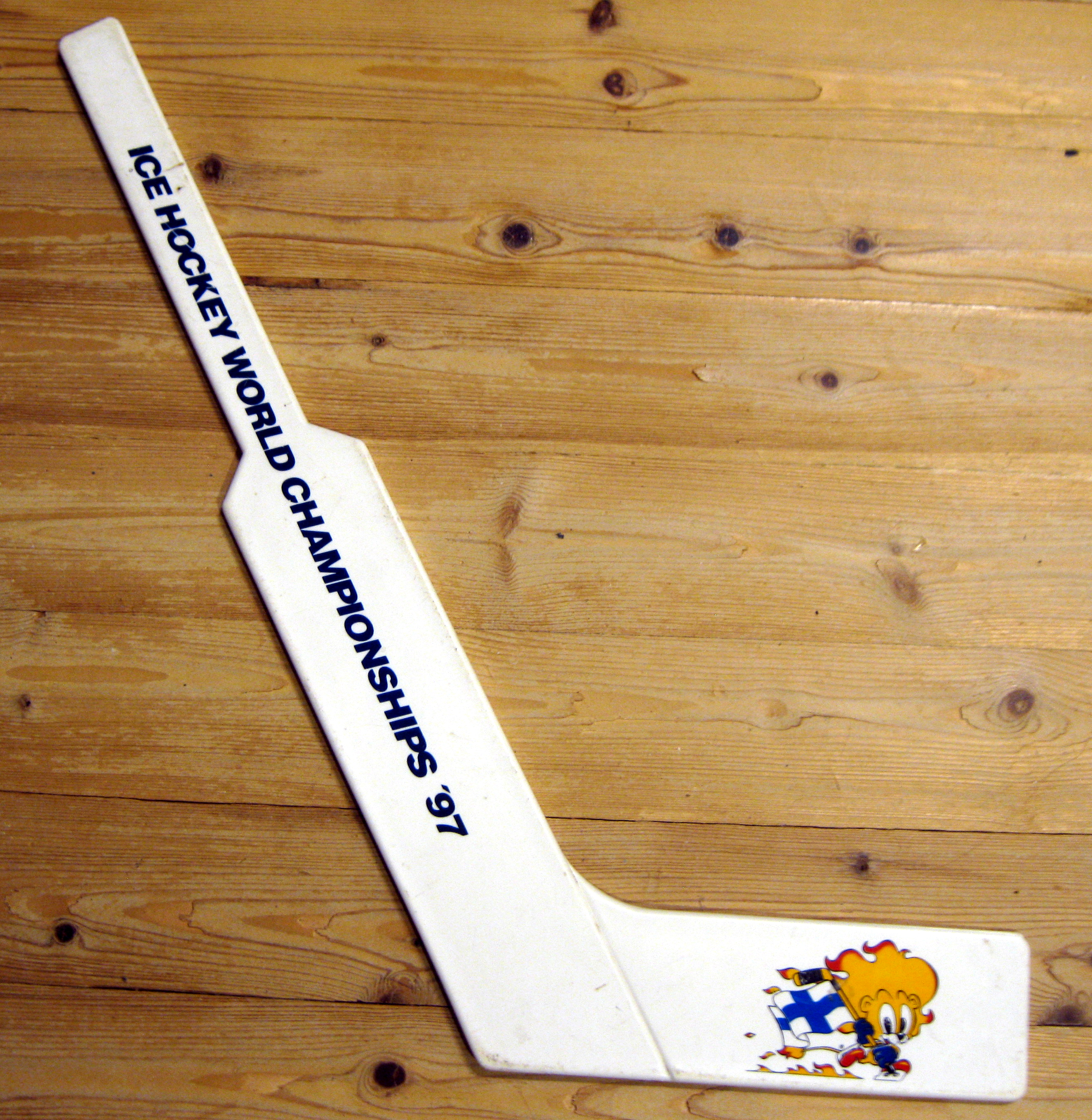

Tournament details
- Host country: Finland
- Venues: 3 (in 3 host cities)
- Dates: 26 April – 14 May
- Teams: 12

Final positions
- Champions: Canada (21st title)
- Runners-up: Sweden
- Third place: Czech Republic
- Fourth place: Russia

Tournament statistics
- Games played: 52
- Goals scored: 302 (5.81 per game)
- Attendance: 526,000 (10,115 per game)
- Scoring leader: (Czech Republic) Martin Procházka 14 points

The 1997 Men's Ice Hockey World Championships was the 61st such event sanctioned by the International Ice Hockey Federation (IIHF). Teams representing 36 countries participated in several levels of competition, while three other teams competed in an exhibition tournament to gain experience before joining on an official basis in the 1998 competition. The competition also served as qualifications for group placements in the 1998 competition.

The top Championship Group tournament took place in Finland from 26 April to 14 May 1997, with matches played in Helsinki, Tampere and Turku. Twelve teams took part, with the first round being split into two teams of six, and the six best teams going to a further group stage. Canada beat Sweden in the final game, best of three, where they won 2–1 in games, and became world champions for the 21st time.

== World Championship Group A (Finland) ==
=== Group 1 ===
| Pos | Team | Pld | W | D | L | GF | GA | GD | Pts |
|---|---|---|---|---|---|---|---|---|---|
| 1 | Czech Republic | 5 | 4 | 0 | 1 | 18 | 9 | +9 | 8 |
| 2 | Finland | 5 | 4 | 0 | 1 | 25 | 9 | +16 | 8 |
| 3 | Russia | 5 | 3 | 1 | 1 | 19 | 16 | +3 | 7 |
| 4 | Slovakia | 5 | 1 | 1 | 3 | 10 | 14 | −4 | 3 |
| 5 | France | 5 | 1 | 0 | 4 | 13 | 26 | −13 | 2 |
| 6 | Germany | 5 | 1 | 0 | 4 | 4 | 15 | −11 | 2 |

| 26 April | Czech Republic | 2-1 | Germany |

| 26 April | Finland | 6-1 | France |

| 27 April | Russia | 2-2 | Slovakia |

| 27 April | Finland | 1-2 | Czech Republic |

| 28 April | Slovakia | 5-3 | France |

| 28 April | Germany | 1-5 | Russia |

| 29 April | Finland | 6-0 | Germany |

| 30 April | Russia | 5-4 | France |

| 30 April | Czech Republic | 3-1 | Slovakia |

| 1 May | Czech Republic | 2-3 | Russia |

| 2 May | France | 2-1 | Germany |

| 2 May | Finland | 5-2 | Slovakia |

| 3 May | France | 3-9 | Czech Republic |

| 3 May | Slovakia | 0-1 | Germany |

| 3 May | Finland | 7-4 | Russia |

=== Group 2 ===
| Pos | Team | Pld | W | D | L | GF | GA | GD | Pts |
|---|---|---|---|---|---|---|---|---|---|
| 1 | Sweden | 5 | 4 | 1 | 0 | 20 | 8 | +12 | 9 |
| 2 | Canada | 5 | 3 | 1 | 1 | 23 | 11 | +12 | 7 |
| 3 | United States | 5 | 3 | 0 | 2 | 14 | 15 | −1 | 6 |
| 4 | Latvia | 5 | 1 | 2 | 2 | 18 | 17 | +1 | 4 |
| 5 | Italy | 5 | 1 | 1 | 3 | 12 | 21 | −9 | 3 |
| 6 | Norway | 5 | 0 | 1 | 4 | 7 | 22 | −15 | 1 |

| 26 April | Canada | 7-0 | Norway |

| 26 April | Sweden | 5-3 | Italy |

| 27 April | United States | 5-4 | Latvia |

| 27 April | Sweden | 7-2 | Canada |

| 28 April | Italy | 5-4 | Latvia |

| 28 April | Norway | 1-3 | United States |

| 29 April | Sweden | 4-1 | Norway |

| 30 April | Canada | 3-3 | Latvia |

| 30 April | United States | 4-2 | Italy |

| 1 May | Canada | 5-1 | United States |

| 2 May | Italy | 2-2 | Norway |

| 2 May | Sweden | 1-1 | Latvia |

| 3 May | Italy | 0-6 | Canada |

| 3 May | United States | 1-3 | Sweden |

| 3 May | Latvia | 6-3 | Norway |

=== Second Round 1–6 Place ===
Teams that had played each other in the first round carried those results forward. First and second place played off for gold, third and fourth for bronze.

| Pos | Team | Pld | W | D | L | GF | GA | GD | Pts |
|---|---|---|---|---|---|---|---|---|---|
| 1 | Sweden | 5 | 4 | 0 | 1 | 17 | 9 | +8 | 8 |
| 2 | Canada | 5 | 3 | 0 | 2 | 13 | 14 | −1 | 6 |
| 3 | Russia | 5 | 2 | 1 | 2 | 13 | 13 | 0 | 5 |
| 4 | Czech Republic | 5 | 2 | 0 | 3 | 12 | 12 | 0 | 4 |
| 5 | Finland | 5 | 2 | 0 | 3 | 12 | 12 | 0 | 4 |
| 6 | United States | 5 | 1 | 1 | 3 | 7 | 14 | −7 | 3 |

| 5 May | Czech Republic | 3-4 | United States |

| 5 May | Sweden | 1-4 | Russia |

| 6 May | Finland | 0-1 | Canada |

| 6 May | Russia | 1-1 | United States |

| 7 May | Canada | 3-5 | Czech Republic |

| 7 May | Finland | 2-5 | Sweden |

| 8 May | Czech Republic | 0-1 | Sweden |

| 9 May | Canada | 2-1 | Russia |

| 9 May | United States | 0-2 | Finland |

=== Consolation Round 7–12 Place ===
Teams that had played each other in the first round carried those results forward. Last place was not relegated to Group B, instead they had to play against three qualifiers from Group B for the last two openings in the 1998 Group A tournament. This was Germany's lowest finish since 1965.

| Pos | Team | Pld | W | D | L | GF | GA | GD | Pts |
|---|---|---|---|---|---|---|---|---|---|
| 7 | Latvia | 5 | 4 | 0 | 1 | 29 | 14 | +15 | 8 |
| 8 | Italy | 5 | 3 | 1 | 1 | 23 | 13 | +10 | 7 |
| 9 | Slovakia | 5 | 3 | 0 | 2 | 15 | 13 | +2 | 6 |
| 10 | France | 5 | 2 | 0 | 3 | 12 | 23 | −11 | 4 |
| 11 | Germany | 5 | 2 | 0 | 3 | 8 | 17 | −9 | 4 |
| 12 | Norway | 5 | 0 | 1 | 4 | 11 | 18 | −7 | 1 |

Norway was sent to 1998 Group A Qualifier.

| 6 May | Slovakia | 2-1 | Norway |

| 6 May | Latvia | 8-0 | Germany |

| 7 May | Norway | 3-4 | France |

| 7 May | Italy | 5-2 | Germany |

| 8 May | Italy | 3-4 | Slovakia |

| 8 May | Latvia | 6-2 | France |

| 9 May | Germany | 4-2 | Norway |

| 10 May | Slovakia | 4-5 | Latvia |

| 10 May | France | 1-8 | Italy |

=== Match for third place ===
| 10 May | Czech Republic | 4–3 (2-1, 1-0, 1-2) | Russia | Helsinki; Attendance: 13,249 |

Referee:
(Finland) Seppo Mäkelä

| Rostislav Vlach − 10:24 | 1-0 |
| Vladimir Vujtek − 12:21 | 2-0 |
| | 2-1 | 14:44 − Alexander Korolyuk |
| Martin Procházka − 26:45 | 3-1 |
| | 3-2 | 40:58 − Alexei Yashin |
| | 3-3 | 48:49 − Aleksandr Prokopiev |
| Jiří Dopita − 58:10 | 4-3 |

=== Final ===
| 11 May | Sweden | 3–2 (1-1, 1-0, 1-1) | Canada | Helsinki; Attendance: 13,220 |

Referee:
(United States) Don Adam

| | 0-1 | 10:54 – Mark Recchi |
| Jonas Höglund – 15:29 | 1-1 |
| Niklas Sundblad – 35:47 | 2-1 |
| Marcus Thuresson – 56:05 | 3-1 |
| | 3-2 | 59:22 – Anson Carter |

| 13 May | Sweden | 1–3 (0-0, 1-2, 0-1) | Canada | Helsinki; Attendance: 13,316 |

Referee:
(United States) Gerhard Müller

| | 0-1 | 29:11 – Geoff Sanderson |
| Per Eklund – 30:56 | 1-1 |
| | 1-2 | 38:09 – Anson Carter |
| | 1-3 | 47:42 – Mark Recchi |

| 14 May | Canada | 2–1 (1-0, 1-0, 0-1) | Sweden | Helsinki; Attendance: 13,181 |

Referee:
(United States) Don Adam

| Dean Evason – 18:39 | 1-0 |
| Owen Nolan – 21:56 | 2-0 |
| | 2-1 | 58:43 – Michael Nylander |

== World Championship Group B (Poland) ==
Played 12–21 April in Katowice (Spodek) and Sosnowiec (Stadion Zimowy). With the announcement that Group A would be expanding from twelve to sixteen nations, Group B would also undergo significant changes. The winner and next year's host (Switzerland) were promoted. In addition, the remaining three best teams would win the opportunity to play in a qualifying tournament against the last place team from Group A, where the top two would be included in the Group A tournament.

| Pos | Team | Pld | W | D | L | GF | GA | GD | Pts |
|---|---|---|---|---|---|---|---|---|---|
| 13 | Belarus | 7 | 7 | 0 | 0 | 48 | 21 | +27 | 14 |
| 14 | Kazakhstan | 7 | 5 | 1 | 1 | 31 | 21 | +10 | 11 |
| 15 | Switzerland | 7 | 3 | 2 | 2 | 26 | 22 | +4 | 8 |
| 16 | Austria | 7 | 2 | 3 | 2 | 22 | 22 | 0 | 7 |
| 17 | Poland | 7 | 2 | 2 | 3 | 19 | 24 | −5 | 6 |
| 18 | Great Britain | 7 | 2 | 1 | 4 | 28 | 22 | +6 | 5 |
| 19 | Netherlands | 7 | 2 | 1 | 4 | 21 | 38 | −17 | 5 |
| 20 | Denmark | 7 | 0 | 0 | 7 | 19 | 44 | −25 | 0 |

Belarus, as winner, was promoted to Group A. Switzerland, as host, was also promoted to Group A. Kazakhstan, Austria, and Poland were all promoted to the Qualifying tournament for Group A, along with Norway. No one was relegated.

| 12 April | Switzerland | 8-3 | Netherlands |

| 12 April | Poland | 4-3 | Great Britain |

| 12 April | Kazakhstan | 5-3 | Austria |

| 12 April | Belarus | 9-3 | Denmark |

| 13 April | Switzerland | 6-4 | Denmark |

| 13 April | Kazakhstan | 4-2 | Great Britain |

| 13 April | Austria | 2-2 | Netherlands |

| 13 April | Poland | 2-7 | Belarus |

| 15 April | Belarus | 4-3 | Kazakhstan |

| 15 April | Poland | 0-0 | Switzerland |

| 15 April | Austria | 3-1 | Denmark |

| 15 April | Great Britain | 8-2 | Netherlands |

| 16 April | Kazakhstan | 5-2 | Switzerland |

| 16 April | Great Britain | 9-1 | Denmark |

| 16 April | Poland | 4-6 | Austria |

| 16 April | Belarus | 10-2 | Netherlands |

| 18 April | Switzerland | 5-6 | Belarus |

| 18 April | Poland | 3-3 | Kazakhstan |

| 18 April | Austria | 2-2 | Great Britain |

| 18 April | Netherlands | 6-4 | Denmark |

| 20 April | Belarus | 6-4 | Austria |

| 20 April | Kazakhstan | 6-4 | Denmark |

| 20 April | Switzerland | 3-2 | Great Britain |

| 20 April | Poland | 1-3 | Netherlands |

| 21 April | Belarus | 6-2 | Great Britain |

| 21 April | Kazakhstan | 5-3 | Netherlands |

| 21 April | Switzerland | 2-2 | Austria |

| 21 April | Poland | 5-2 | Denmark |

== World Championship Group C (Estonia) ==
Played 22–28 March in Tallinn and Kohtla-Järve. Along with the expansion of Group A, a provision was made to allow the best "Far East" team to qualify directly. Beginning in 1999 there would be a tournament to decide who that would be. But for now, the top placing "Far East" hockey nation was able to proceed directly from Group C to Group A. For this year, as well, promotion to Group B was available to the top three European teams, and there was no relegation.

=== Group 1 ===
| Pos | Team | Pld | W | D | L | GF | GA | GD | Pts |
|---|---|---|---|---|---|---|---|---|---|
| 1 | Japan | 3 | 2 | 1 | 0 | 11 | 3 | +8 | 5 |
| 2 | Estonia | 3 | 1 | 2 | 0 | 18 | 12 | +6 | 4 |
| 3 | Hungary | 3 | 1 | 1 | 1 | 11 | 11 | 0 | 3 |
| 4 | Lithuania | 3 | 0 | 0 | 3 | 5 | 19 | −14 | 0 |

| 22 March | Japan | 3-0 | Lithuania |

| 22 March | Hungary | 5-5 | Estonia |

| 23 March | Hungary | 5-0 | Lithuania |

| 23 March | Estonia | 2-2 | Japan |

| 25 March | Japan | 6-1 | Hungary |

| 25 March | Lithuania | 5-11 | Estonia |

=== Group 2 ===
| Pos | Team | Pld | W | D | L | GF | GA | GD | Pts |
|---|---|---|---|---|---|---|---|---|---|
| 1 | Ukraine | 3 | 3 | 0 | 0 | 17 | 3 | +14 | 6 |
| 2 | Slovenia | 3 | 2 | 0 | 1 | 18 | 4 | +14 | 4 |
| 3 | Romania | 3 | 1 | 0 | 2 | 6 | 17 | −11 | 2 |
| 4 | China | 3 | 0 | 0 | 3 | 7 | 24 | −17 | 0 |

| 22 March | Ukraine | 7-1 | China |

| 22 March | Romania | 0-5 | Slovenia |

| 23 March | Slovenia | 11-1 | China |

| 23 March | Romania | 0-7 | Ukraine |

| 25 March | China | 5-6 | Romania |

| 25 March | Ukraine | 3-2 | Slovenia |

=== Final Round 21–24 Place ===
| Pos | Team | Pld | W | D | L | GF | GA | GD | Pts |
|---|---|---|---|---|---|---|---|---|---|
| 21 | Ukraine | 3 | 2 | 1 | 0 | 7 | 5 | +2 | 5 |
| 22 | Slovenia | 3 | 1 | 1 | 1 | 9 | 7 | +2 | 3 |
| 23 | Estonia | 3 | 0 | 2 | 1 | 6 | 7 | −1 | 2 |
| 24 | Japan | 3 | 0 | 2 | 1 | 5 | 8 | −3 | 2 |

Japan was promoted to Group A as the "Far East Qualifier", Ukraine, Slovenia, and Estonia were all promoted to Group B.

| 27 March | Japan | 1-4 | Slovenia |

| 27 March | Estonia | 1-2 | Ukraine |

| 28 March | Japan | 2-2 | Ukraine |

| 28 March | Estonia | 3-3 | Slovenia |

=== Consolation Round 25–28 Place ===
| Pos | Team | Pld | W | D | L | GF | GA | GD | Pts |
|---|---|---|---|---|---|---|---|---|---|
| 25 | Romania | 3 | 3 | 0 | 0 | 15 | 8 | +7 | 6 |
| 26 | Hungary | 3 | 2 | 0 | 1 | 12 | 5 | +7 | 4 |
| 27 | China | 3 | 1 | 0 | 2 | 14 | 16 | −2 | 2 |
| 28 | Lithuania | 3 | 0 | 0 | 3 | 6 | 18 | −12 | 0 |

| 27 March | Hungary | 7-3 | China |

| 27 March | Romania | 7-3 | Lithuania |

| 28 March | China | 6-3 | Lithuania |

| 28 March | Hungary | 0-2 | Romania |

== World Championship Group D (Andorra) ==
Played 7–14 April in Canillo. With Group A expansion, four nations were promoted to Group C.

=== Group 1 ===
| Pos | Team | Pld | W | D | L | GF | GA | GD | Pts |
|---|---|---|---|---|---|---|---|---|---|
| 1 | Croatia | 3 | 2 | 0 | 1 | 10 | 4 | +6 | 4 |
| 2 | South Korea | 3 | 2 | 0 | 1 | 12 | 8 | +4 | 4 |
| 3 | Belgium | 3 | 2 | 0 | 1 | 7 | 7 | 0 | 4 |
| 4 | Australia | 3 | 0 | 0 | 3 | 9 | 19 | −10 | 0 |

Croatia and South Korea were promoted to Group C.

| 7 April | Australia | 2-7 | Croatia |

| 8 April | Belgium | 1-4 | South Korea |

| 10 April | Belgium | 4-2 | Australia |

| 10 April | Croatia | 2-0 | South Korea |

| 11 April | Australia | 5-8 | South Korea |

| 11 April | Belgium | 2-1 | Croatia |

=== Group 2 ===
| Pos | Team | Pld | W | D | L | GF | GA | GD | Pts |
|---|---|---|---|---|---|---|---|---|---|
| 1 | Spain | 3 | 2 | 0 | 1 | 17 | 13 | +4 | 4 |
| 2 | FR Yugoslavia | 3 | 1 | 1 | 1 | 11 | 11 | 0 | 3 |
| 3 | Bulgaria | 3 | 1 | 1 | 1 | 10 | 10 | 0 | 3 |
| 4 | Israel | 3 | 1 | 0 | 2 | 10 | 14 | −4 | 2 |

Spain and Yugoslavia were promoted to Group C.

| 7 April | Spain | 4-5 | Bulgaria |

| 8 April | Israel | 3-4 | FR Yugoslavia |

| 10 April | Bulgaria | 2-2 | FR Yugoslavia |

| 10 April | Spain | 7-3 | Israel |

| 11 April | Bulgaria | 3-4 | Israel |

| 11 April | Spain | 6-5 | FR Yugoslavia |

=== Final Round 29–32 Place ===
| Pos | Team | Pld | W | D | L | GF | GA | GD | Pts |
|---|---|---|---|---|---|---|---|---|---|
| 29 | Croatia | 3 | 2 | 1 | 0 | 8 | 5 | +3 | 5 |
| 30 | South Korea | 3 | 2 | 0 | 1 | 7 | 3 | +4 | 4 |
| 31 | Spain | 3 | 1 | 0 | 2 | 10 | 11 | −1 | 2 |
| 32 | FR Yugoslavia | 3 | 0 | 1 | 2 | 7 | 13 | −6 | 1 |

| 13 April | Spain | 3-4 | Croatia |

| 13 April | FR Yugoslavia | 0-5 | South Korea |

| 14 April | Croatia | 2-2 | FR Yugoslavia |

| 14 April | Spain | 1-2 | South Korea |

=== Consolation Round 33–36 Place ===
| Pos | Team | Pld | W | D | L | GF | GA | GD | Pts |
|---|---|---|---|---|---|---|---|---|---|
| 33 | Israel | 3 | 2 | 0 | 1 | 12 | 14 | −2 | 4 |
| 34 | Australia | 3 | 1 | 1 | 1 | 13 | 10 | +3 | 3 |
| 35 | Bulgaria | 3 | 1 | 1 | 1 | 10 | 9 | +1 | 3 |
| 36 | Belgium | 3 | 1 | 0 | 2 | 9 | 11 | −2 | 2 |

| 13 April | Bulgaria | 3-3 | Australia |

| 13 April | Belgium | 3-5 | Israel |

| 14 April | Israel | 3-8 | Australia |

| 14 April | Belgium | 2-4 | Bulgaria |

== Unofficial Group E ==
Three men's teams that were going to be included in Group D in 1998 played a tournament in Ankara Turkey from 19 to 24 February 1997.

| Pos | Team | Pld | W | D | L | GF | GA | GD | Pts |
|---|---|---|---|---|---|---|---|---|---|
| 1 | South Africa | 4 | 3 | 1 | 0 | 36 | 8 | +28 | 7 |
| 2 | New Zealand | 4 | 2 | 1 | 1 | 23 | 20 | +3 | 5 |
| 3 | Turkey | 4 | 0 | 0 | 4 | 14 | 45 | −31 | 0 |

| Turkey | 1-14 | South Africa |

| Turkey | 7-9 | New Zealand |

| South Africa | 4-4 | New Zealand |

| South Africa | 5-1 | New Zealand |

| Turkey | 2-13 | South Africa |

| Turkey | 4-9 | New Zealand |

== Ranking and statistics ==
1997 IIHF World Championship winners

Canada
21st title

=== Tournament Awards ===
- Best players selected by the directorate:
  - Best Goaltender: (Sweden) Tommy Salo
  - Best Defenceman: (Canada) Rob Blake
  - Best Forward: (Sweden) Michael Nylander
- Media All-Star Team:
  - Goaltender: (Sweden) Tommy Salo
  - Defence: (Canada) Rob Blake, (Finland) Teppo Numminen
  - Forwards: (Sweden) Michael Nylander, (Czech Republic) Martin Procházka, (Czech Republic) Vladimír Vůjtek

=== Final standings ===
The final standings of the tournament according to IIHF:

| 1st place, gold medalist(s) | Canada |
| 2nd place, silver medalist(s) | Sweden |
| 3rd place, bronze medalist(s) | Czech Republic |
| 4 | Russia |
| 5 | Finland |
| 6 | United States |
| 7 | Latvia |
| 8 | Italy |
| 9 | Slovakia |
| 10 | France |
| 11 | Germany |
| 12 | Norway |

=== Scoring leaders ===
List shows the top skaters sorted by points, then goals.

| Player | GP | G | A | Pts | +/− | PIM | POS |
|---|---|---|---|---|---|---|---|
| (Czech Republic) Martin Procházka | 9 | 7 | 7 | 14 | +10 | 4 | F |
| (Czech Republic) Vladimír Vůjtek | 8 | 7 | 7 | 14 | +11 | 31 | F |
| (Sweden) Michael Nylander | 11 | 6 | 5 | 11 | +1 | 6 | F |
| (Czech Republic) Pavel Patera | 9 | 3 | 8 | 11 | +8 | 4 | F |
| (France) Roger Dubé | 8 | 7 | 3 | 10 | −10 | 2 | F |
| (Latvia) Oleg Znaroks | 8 | 3 | 7 | 10 | −4 | 6 | F |
| (Italy) Gates Orlando | 8 | 5 | 4 | 9 | −1 | 14 | F |
| (Italy) Bruno Zarrillo | 8 | 5 | 4 | 9 | −1 | 4 | F |
| (Latvia) Harijs Vītoliņš | 8 | 4 | 5 | 9 | −3 | 4 | F |
| (Canada) Travis Green | 11 | 3 | 6 | 9 | +2 | 12 | F |

=== Leading goaltenders ===
Only the top five goaltenders, based on save percentage, who have played 40% of their team's minutes are included in this list.

| Player | MIP | GA | GAA | SVS% | SO |
|---|---|---|---|---|---|
| (Finland) Jarmo Myllys | 357 | 10 | 1.68 | .938 | 1 |
| (Latvia) Artūrs Irbe | 300 | 10 | 2.00 | .930 | 1 |
| (Czech Republic) Roman Čechmánek | 479 | 17 | 2.13 | .929 | 0 |
| (Russia) Maxim Mikhailovsky | 359 | 12 | 2.01 | .929 | 0 |
| (Italy) Mike Rosati | 239 | 12 | 3.01 | .925 | 0 |

== IIHF Hall of Fame induction ==
The inaugural IIHF Hall of Fame induction ceremony was held during the 1997 World Championships, with 31 members inducted.

- Austria: Walter Wasservogel
- Belgium: Paul Loicq
- Canada: Father David Bauer, Gordon Juckes, Robert Lebel, Vic Lindquist, Seth Martin, Harry Sinden
- Czech Republic: Vlastimil Bubník, Jaroslav Drobný, Vladimír Kostka, Václav Nedomanský, Vladimír Zábrodský
- Finland: Urpo Ylönen
- France: Louis Magnus
- Germany: Erich Kühnhackl, Günther Sabetzki
- Great Britain: Bunny Ahearne
- Russia: Vsevolod Bobrov, Alexander Ragulin, Andrei Starovoytov, Anatoly Tarasov, Vladislav Tretiak
- Sweden: Arne Grunander, Anders Hedberg, Sven Tumba
- Switzerland: Bibi Torriani
- United States: Walter A. Brown, Bill Cleary, Gerry Cosby, John Mayasich

== See also ==
- 1997 World Junior Ice Hockey Championships
- 1997 IIHF Women's World Championship
