= 2001 Men's Ice Hockey World Championships =

2001 edition of the Men's World Ice Hockey Championship

The 2001 Men's Ice Hockey World Championships were the 65th such event organized by the International Ice Hockey Federation. 40 teams representing their countries participated in several levels of competition. The competition also served as qualifications for division placements in the 2002 competition.

== Championship ==
Final standings

1. Czech Republic
2. Finland
3. Sweden
4. United States
5. Canada
6. Russia
7. Slovakia
8. Germany
9. Switzerland
10. Ukraine
11. Austria
12. Italy
13. Latvia
14. Belarus — relegated to Division I for 2002
15. Norway — relegated to Division I for 2002
16. Japan

== Division I ==
=== Group A ===
Group A was played in Grenoble, France between April 16 and April 22, 2001. Coached by Wiktor Pysz, Poland earned promotion from Division I for the first time in ten years.

Team	Pld	W	L	D	GF	GA	GD	Pts
Poland	5	4	1	0	27	9	+18	8
France	5	3	1	1	20	10	+10	7
Denmark	5	3	2	0	23	14	+9	6
Hungary	5	3	2	0	19	15	+4	6
Netherlands	5	1	3	1	10	25	−15	3
Lithuania	5	0	5	0	10	36	−26	0

Source: IIHF

April 16, 2001; 13:00	Hungary	3–5	Denmark

April 16, 2001; 16:30	Netherlands	0–4	Poland

April 16, 2001; 20:00	Lithuania	1–7	France

April 17, 2001; 13:00	Poland	3–0	Hungary

April 17, 2001; 16:30	Denmark	8–1	Lithuania

April 17, 2001; 20:00	France	4–4	Netherlands

April 19, 2001; 13:00	Lithuania	2–3	Netherlands

April 19, 2001; 16:30	Poland	5–3	Denmark

April 19, 2001; 20:00	France	1–3	Hungary

April 21, 2001; 13:00	Netherlands	2–8	Hungary

April 21, 2001; 16:30	Poland	13–2	Lithuania

April 21, 2001; 20:00	Denmark	0–4	France

April 22, 2001; 13:00	Hungary	5–4	Lithuania

April 22, 2001; 16:30	Denmark	7–1	Netherlands

April 22, 2001; 20:00	France	4–2	Poland

=== Group B ===
Group B was played in Ljubljana, Slovenia between April 15 and April 21, 2001. The final day was a controversial one, with the British and Slovene teams having to decide promotion based on overall goal differential. The British beat the Kazakhs by an improbable nine goals. When coach Chris McSorley was asked how much he paid the Kazakhs, he responded, "zero, you have not much confidence in your team, I think Slovenia can beat Estonia by at least 12 goals." The medal presentation was marred by Slovenian fans throwing debris on the ice when the Brits received their silver medals, the Kazakh team did not even attend to receive their bronze.

Team	Pld	W	L	D	GF	GA	GD	Pts
Slovenia	5	4	0	1	44	6	+38	9
Great Britain	5	4	0	1	42	9	+33	9
Kazakhstan	5	3	2	0	35	21	+14	6
Croatia	5	1	3	1	17	45	−28	3
China	5	1	4	0	8	39	−31	2
Estonia	5	0	4	1	13	39	−26	1

Source: IIHF

April 15, 2001; 11:00	Kazakhstan	12–1	China

April 15, 2001; 14:30	Great Britain	6–2	Estonia

April 15, 2001; 18:00	Croatia	1–15	Slovenia

April 17, 2001; 11:00	Estonia	3–8	Kazakhstan

April 17, 2001; 14:30	Great Britain	10–1	Croatia

April 17, 2001; 18:00	Slovenia	7–1	China

April 18, 2001; 11:00	Croatia	3–12	Kazakhstan

April 18, 2001; 14:30	China	3–2	Estonia

April 18, 2001; 18:00	Slovenia	3–3	Great Britain

April 20, 2001; 11:00	Great Britain	12–1	China

April 20, 2001; 14:30	Estonia	6–6	Croatia

April 20, 2001; 18:00	Kazakhstan	1–3	Slovenia

April 21, 2001; 11:00	China	2–6	Croatia

April 21, 2001; 14:30	Kazakhstan	2–11	Great Britain

April 21, 2001; 18:00	Estonia	0–16	Slovenia

Poland and Slovenia are promoted to the 2002 Men's World Ice Hockey Championships, while Estonia and Lithuania are relegated to Division II.

== Division II ==
=== Group A ===
Group A was played in Majadahonda, Spain between April 1 and April 7, 2001

Team	Pld	W	L	D	GF	GA	GD	Pts
South Korea	5	5	0	0	42	5	+37	10
Spain	5	4	1	0	52	8	+44	8
Australia	5	3	2	0	40	23	+17	6
South Africa	5	2	3	0	17	48	−31	4
Iceland	5	1	4	0	11	34	−23	2
New Zealand	5	0	5	0	12	56	−44	0

Source: IIHF

April 1, 2001; 13:00	South Africa	0–13	Spain

April 1, 2001; 17:00	New Zealand	0–13	South Korea

April 1, 2001; 21:00	Iceland	2–6	Australia

April 2, 2001; 13:00	South Korea	10–1	South Africa

April 2, 2001; 17:00	Australia	13–3	New Zealand

April 2, 2001; 21:00	Spain	14–1	Iceland

April 4, 2001; 13:00	New Zealand	6–7	South Africa

April 4, 2001; 17:00	South Korea	7–0	Iceland

April 4, 2001; 21:00	Spain	5–3	Australia

April 5, 2001; 13:00	South Africa	5–3	Iceland

April 5, 2001; 17:00	Australia	2–9	South Korea

April 5, 2001; 21:00	Spain	18–1	New Zealand

April 7, 2001; 13:00	South Korea	3–2	Spain

April 7, 2001; 17:00	Australia	16–4	South Africa

April 7, 2001; 21:00	Iceland	5–2	New Zealand

=== Group B ===
Group B was played in Bucharest, Romania between March 26 and April 1, 2001

Team	Pld	W	L	D	GF	GA	GD	Pts
Romania	5	5	0	0	46	4	+42	10
Israel	5	4	1	0	21	11	+10	8
Yugoslavia	5	2	2	1	24	13	+11	5
Bulgaria	5	2	3	0	21	25	−4	4
Belgium	5	1	3	1	23	20	+3	3
Mexico	5	0	5	0	4	66	−62	0

Source: IIHF

March 26, 2001; 11:30	Belgium	1–5	Israel

March 26, 2001; 15:00	Bulgaria	1–5	Yugoslavia

March 26, 2001; 19:30	Romania	19–0	Mexico

March 27, 2001; 11:30	Yugoslavia	4–4	Belgium

March 27, 2001; 15:00	Israel	7–1	Mexico

March 27, 2001; 19:30	Romania	8–0	Bulgaria

March 29, 2001; 11:30	Mexico	3–14	Bulgaria

March 29, 2001; 15:00	Yugoslavia	1–2	Israel

March 29, 2001; 20:00	Romania	6–1	Belgium

March 31, 2001; 10:00	Bulgaria	5–4	Belgium

March 31, 2001; 13:00	Israel	2–7	Romania

March 31, 2001; 17:00	Yugoslavia	13–0	Mexico

April 1, 2001; 10:00	Belgium	13–0	Mexico

April 1, 2001; 13:00	Israel	5–1	Bulgaria

April 1, 2001; 17:00	Romania	6–1	Yugoslavia

South Korea and Romania are promoted to Division I and Mexico and New Zealand are relegated to Division II Qualification.
