= Juan José Martín =

Chilean climate activist

Juan José Martin Bravo
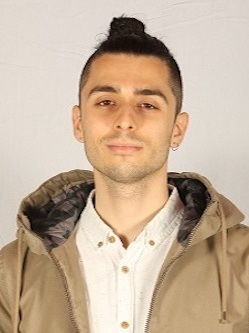

Member of the Constitutional Convention
- In office 4 July 2021 – 4 July 2022
- President: Sebastián Piñera
- Constituency: 12th District

Personal details
- Born: 27 October 1995 (age 31) Santiago, Chile
- Other political affiliations: Non-Neutral Independents
- Education: Pontifical Catholic University of Chile
- Occupation: Political activist
- Profession: Geographer

Juan José Martin Bravo (27 October 1995) is a Chilean climate activist. He is president of CVerde, and he was a general coordinator of the COY15 (World Youth Conference) In 2018, Cverde was awarded the National Environmental Award of Chile.

== Life ==
He is a student at Pontificia Universidad Católica.

In 2019, he was a climate youth delegate to the United Nations.

He was a candidate for National Congress of Chile in the 2021 general election. He is a member of the Non-Neutral Independents party. In 2021, he participated in the Convention Regulation Commission, including ecocide, in the environmental history.
