= Koji Yamada =

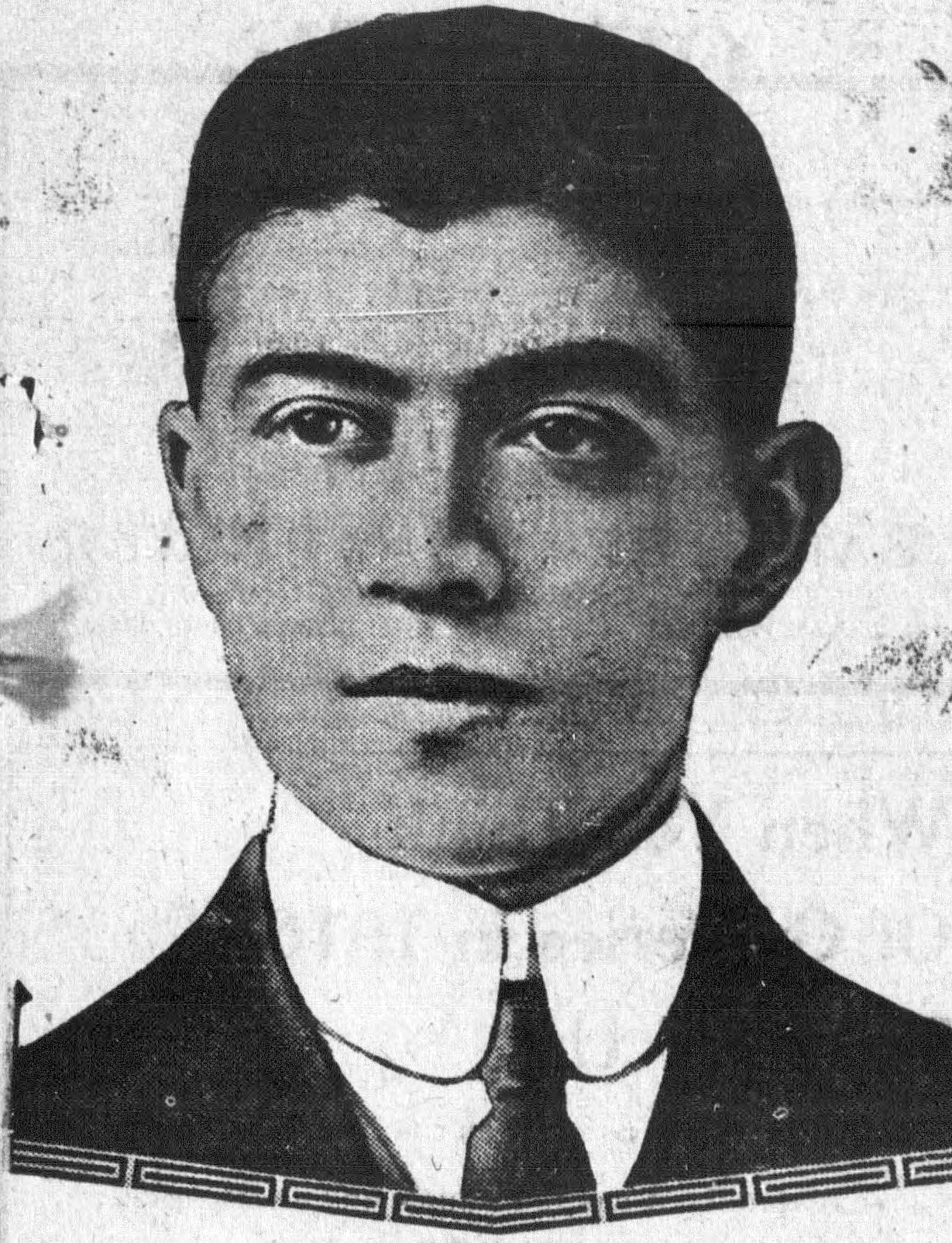
Portrait of Koji Yamada from a newspaper in 1916.

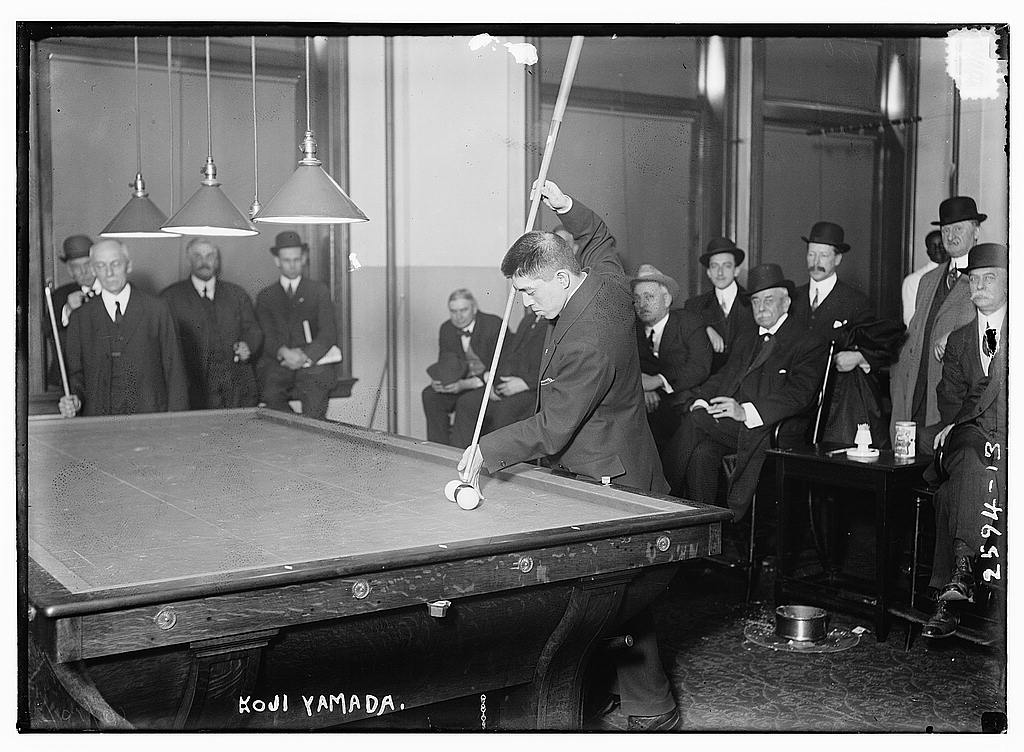
Koji Yamada in 1912 in the United States

Koji Yamada (Japanese: 山田 浩二, Hepburn: Yamada Kouji; January 29, 1887 – September 16, 1941) was a Japanese billiards world champion.

== Biography ==
Born in Tokyo, he moved to Berlin in 1910 at the age of 22, to study billiards, residing there for approximately two years. He is known to be in the United States in 1912, beating Ora Morningstar in a balkline tournament and in 1913, participating in the world championship and winning against players like Willie Hoppe (for the championship) and Jean Bruno, whoever is not known if he stayed directly in the United States in these two years, or if he stayed somewhere else between them.

After returning to Japan, he opened a pool club at Marunouchi to spread the game and guide younger generations. At 1934, he published the book "The latest billiards: four-ball, balkline, curved ball". At 1941 he was given the title of "first billiard master", but died suddenly in the same year, at 54 years old.
