= Serbia and Montenegro men's national ice hockey team =

Serbia and Montenegro
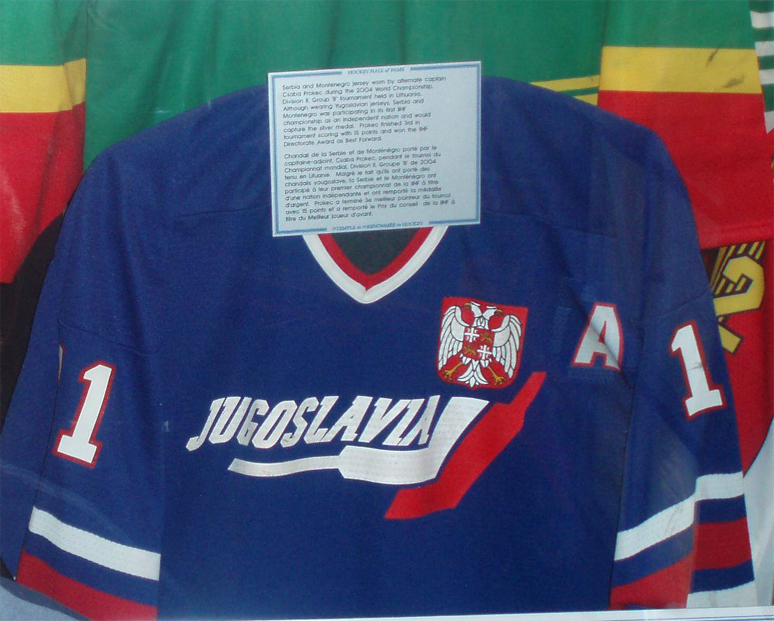
- IIHF code: SCG

Ranking
- Highest IIHF: 29 (2003–06)
- Lowest IIHF: 29 (2003–06)

First international
- Ukraine 15 – 3 FR Yugoslavia (Federal Republic of Yugoslavia) (Sofia, Bulgaria; March 20, 1995); Last international Romania 11 – 1 Serbia and Montenegro (Sofia, Bulgaria; April 2, 2006)

Biggest win
- Serbia and Montenegro 19 – 0 Mexico (Seoul, South Korea; April 9, 2003)

Biggest defeat
- Ukraine 21 – 0 FR Yugoslavia (Federal Republic of Yugoslavia) (Tychy, Poland; December 18, 1996); Norway 21 – 0 Serbia and Montenegro (Stavanger, Norway; November 12, 2004)

Olympics
- Appearances: none

IIHF World Championships
- Appearances: 11 (first in 1995)
- Best result: 28th (1995)

The Serbia and Montenegro men's national ice hockey team was the national ice hockey team in Serbia and Montenegro. Originally created as the Federal Republic of Yugoslavia (FRY) national team, after the dissolution of the Socialist Federal Republic of Yugoslavia (Yugoslavia) in April 1992, it assumed the former Yugoslavia national ice hockey team's position in the IIHF World Championships, when they returned to world competition in 1995. The team was renamed the Serbia and Montenegro national team in 2003, when the FRY renamed itself. When Serbia and Montenegro split in 2006, the legacy and position in the IIHF World Championships was assumed by the Serbia national ice hockey team.

== International competitions ==
Serbia and Montenegro took part in the following international competitions.

- 1939–1992 (Yugoslavia men's national ice hockey team)
- 1993–1994 Did not participate
- 1995 – Finish: 8th in Pool C (28th overall)
- 1996 – Finish: 2nd in Pool D (30th overall)
- 1997 – Finish: 4th in Pool D (32nd overall)
- 1998 – Finish: 6th in Pool C (30th overall)
- 1999 – The host Dutch government had suspended diplomatic relations with Yugoslavia, due to the Kosovo War, and did not allow the team to attend the tournament
- 2000 – Finish: 8th in Pool C (32nd overall)
- 2001 – Finish: 3rd in Division II Group B (34th overall)
- 2002 – Finish: 2nd in Division II Group B (32nd overall)
- 2003 – Finish: 2nd in Division II Group A (31st overall)
- 2004 – Finish: 2nd in Division II Group B (32nd overall)
- 2005 – Finish: 2nd in Division II Group B (32nd overall)
- 2006 – Finish: 4th in Division II Group A (35th overall)
