= List of Olympic men's ice hockey players for Slovenia =

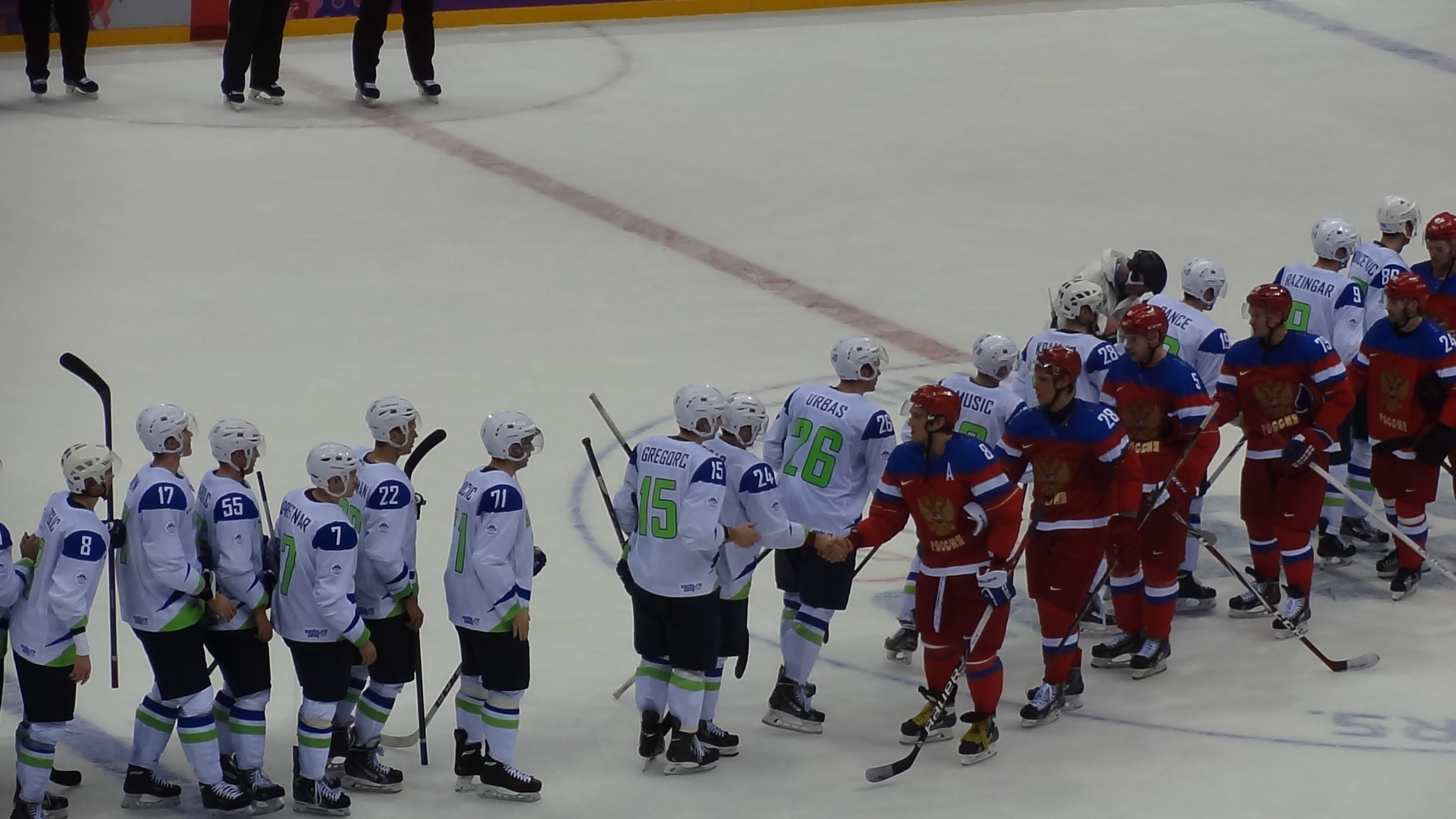
The Slovenian national team (left, in white) shakes hands with the Russian national team after a match at the 2014 Winter Olympics; this was Slovenia's first game at the Olympics.

The list of Olympic men's ice hockey players for Slovenia consisted of 26 skaters and 3 goaltenders. Men's ice hockey tournaments have been staged at the Olympic Games since 1920 (it was introduced at the 1920 Summer Olympics, and was permanently added to the Winter Olympic Games in 1924). Slovenia has participated in two tournaments, the first in 2014 and most recently in 2018, though from 1964 until 1984 they participated as part of Yugoslavia. Slovenia's best finish has been seventh place, at the 2014 Winter Olympics.

Eighteen players were in both Olympic tournaments Slovenia has participated in, while eleven have played in all nine games Slovenia played. Jan Muršak has scored the most goals, 4, assists, 5, and point, 9, for Slovenia at the Olympics.

== Key ==
General terms
Term	Definition
GP	Games played
Olympics	Number of Olympic Games tournaments
Ref(s)	Reference(s)

Goaltender statistical abbreviations
Abbreviation	Definition
W	Wins
L	Losses
T	Ties
Min	Minutes played
SO	Shutouts
GA	Goals against
GAA	Goals against average

Skater statistical abbreviations
Abbreviation	Definition
G	Goals
A	Assists
P	Points
PIM	Penalty minutes

== Goaltenders ==
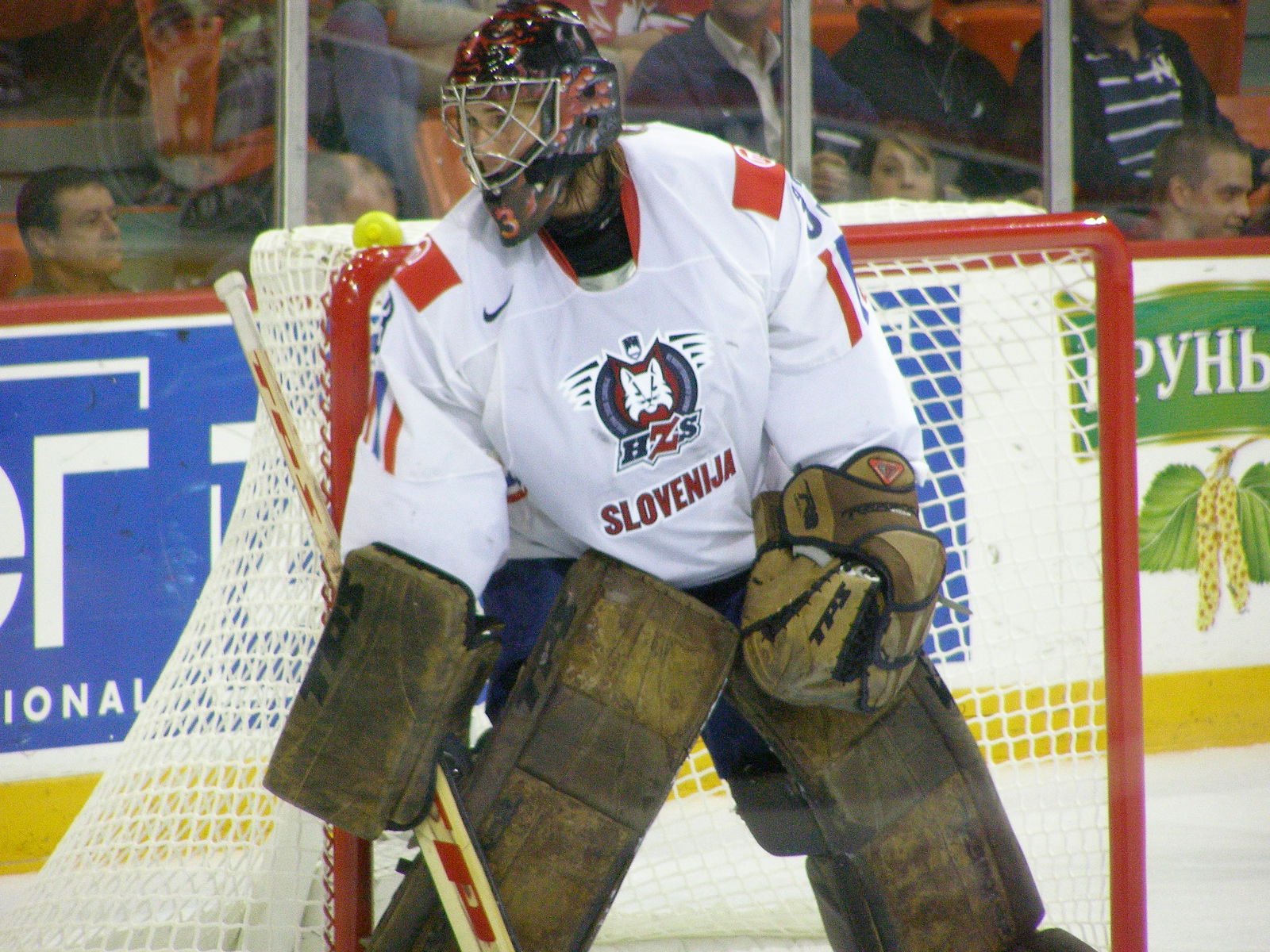
Robert Kristan played four games at the 2014 Winter Olympics, Slovenia's first Olympic tournament.

Goaltenders
Player	Olympics	Tournament(s)	GP	W	L	T	Min	SO	GA	GAA	Notes	Ref(s)
Luka Gračnar	2	2014, 2018	2	0	2	0	120	0	13	6.50		
Robert Kristan	1	2014	4	2	2	0	240	1	11	2.75		
Gašper Krošelj	1	2018	3	1	1	0	189	0	6	1.91		

== Skaters ==
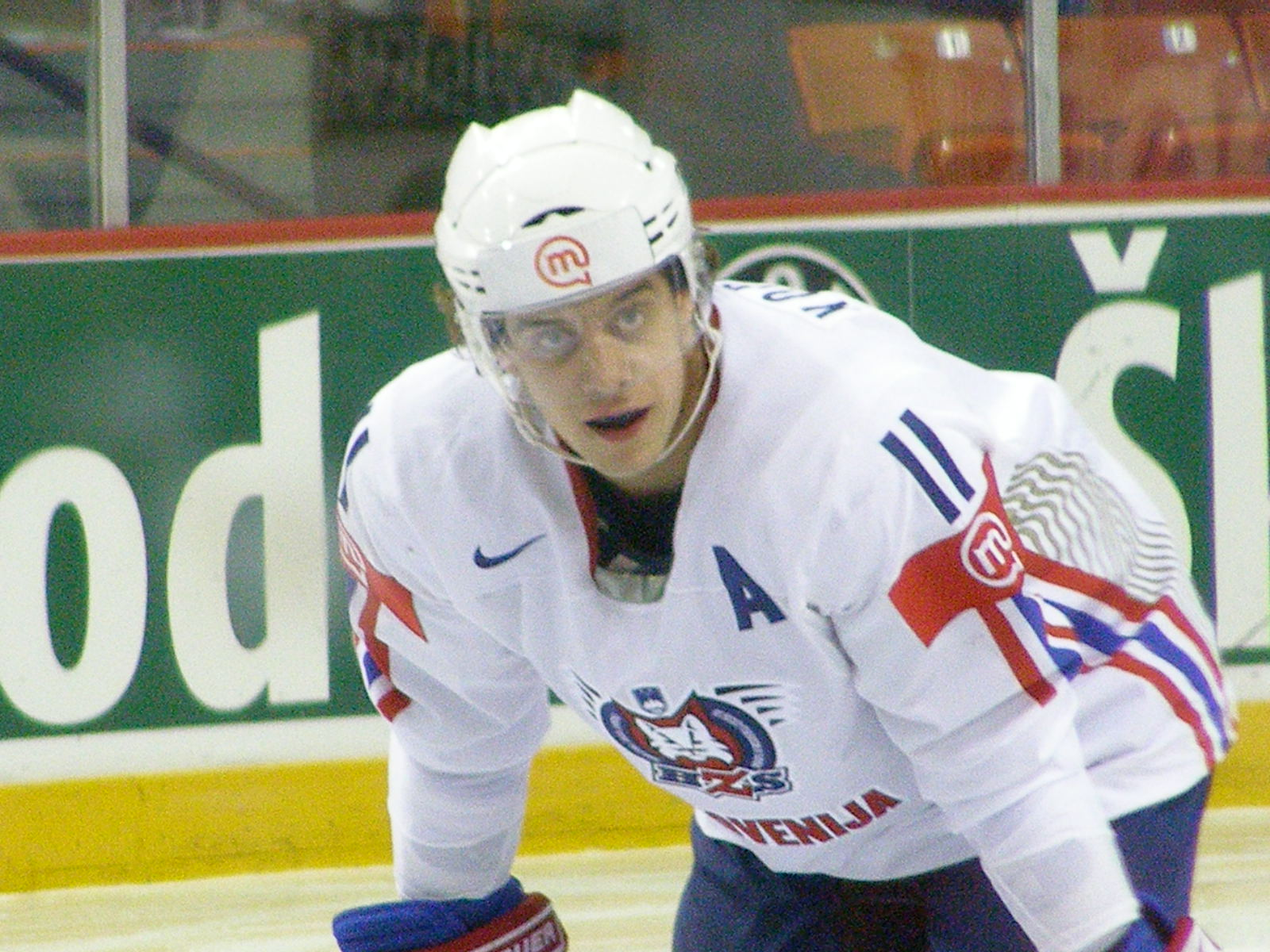
Anže Kopitar scored three points in five games at the 2014 Winter Olympics

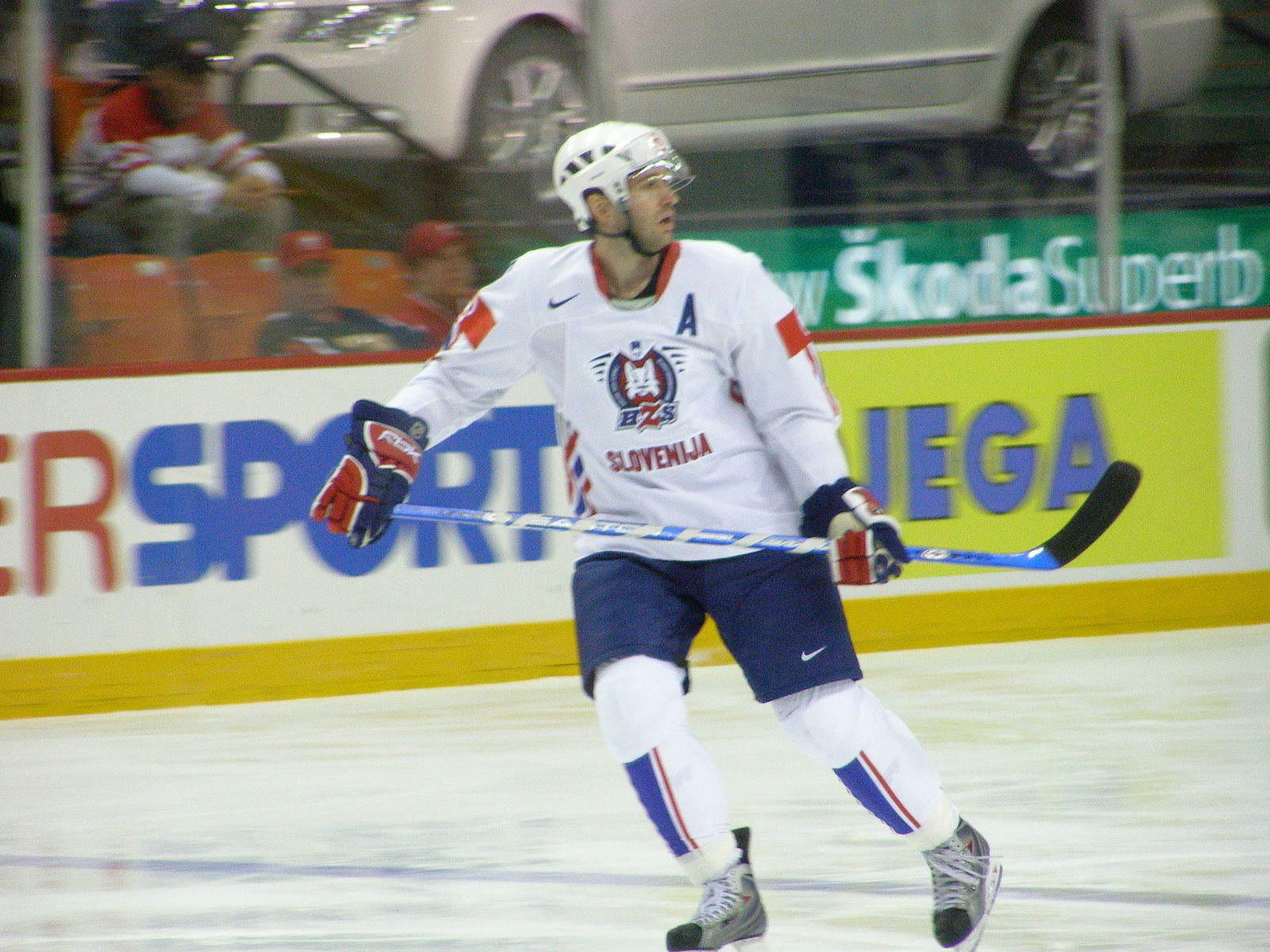
Tomaž Razingar served as Slovenia's captain at the 2014 Winter Olympics

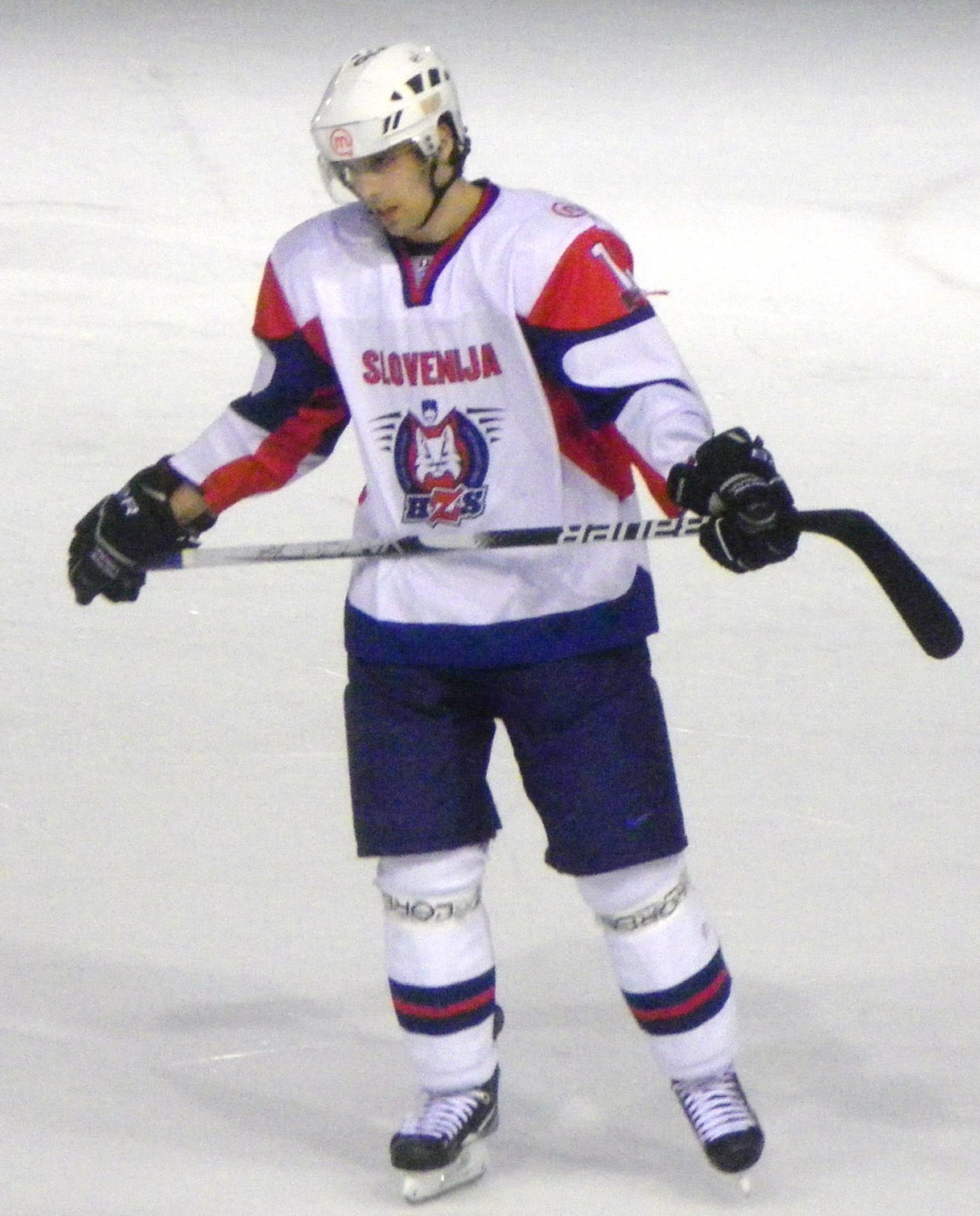
David Rodman played at both the 2014 and 2018 Winter Olympics, recording three assists in eight games

Skaters
Player	Olympics	Tournaments	GP	G	A	P	PIM	Notes	Ref(s)
Boštjan Goličič	2	2014, 2018	9	0	0	0	0		
Blaž Gregorc	2	2014, 2018	9	1	3	4	2		
Andrej Hebar	2	2014, 2018	7	0	0	0	2		
Žiga Jeglič	2	2014, 2018	8	3	2	5	6		
Anže Kopitar	1	2014	5	2	1	3	4		
Sabahudin Kovačevič	2	2014, 2018	8	1	1	2	2		
Aleš Kranjc	2	2014, 2018	8	0	0	0	2		
Anže Kuralt	1	2018	4	1	2	3	2		
Jan Muršak	2	2014, 2018	9	4	5	9	4	Team captain (2018)	
Aleš Mušič	2	2014, 2018	9	0	0	0	0		
Ken Ograjenšek	1	2018	4	0	0	0	0		
Žiga Pance	2	2014, 2018	9	1	0	1	2		
Žiga Pavlin	2	2014, 2018	6	0	0	0	6		
Matic Podlipnik	2	2014, 2018	9	0	0	0	0		
Klemen Pretnar	1	2014	5	0	0	0	2		
Tomaž Razingar	1	2014	5	1	0	1	0	Team captain (2014)	
Jurij Repe	1	2018	4	0	0	0	2		
Mitja Robar	2	2014, 2018	9	0	1	1	2		
David Rodman	2	2014, 2018	8	0	3	3	0		
Marcel Rodman	2	2014, 2018	9	1	1	2	2		
Robert Sabolič	2	2014, 2018	9	0	2	2	6		
Andrej Tavželj	1	2014	5	0	0	0	2		
Rok Tičar	2	2014, 2018	9	1	2	3	2		
Jan Urbas	2	2014, 2018	9	3	3	6	0		
Miha Verlič	2	2014, 2018	5	0	2	2	0		
Luka Vidmar	1	2018	4	0	1	1	4		
