= Kopitar =

Kopitar is a Slovene surname. Notable people with the surname include:

- Anže Kopitar (born 1987), Slovenian hockey player
- Jernej Kopitar (1780–1844), Slovenian linguist
- Matjaž Kopitar (born 1965), Slovenian ice hockey player and coach
- Gašper Kopitar (born 1992), Slovenian ice hockey player
- Rok Kopitar (born 1959), Slovenian hurdler
