= Matjaž =

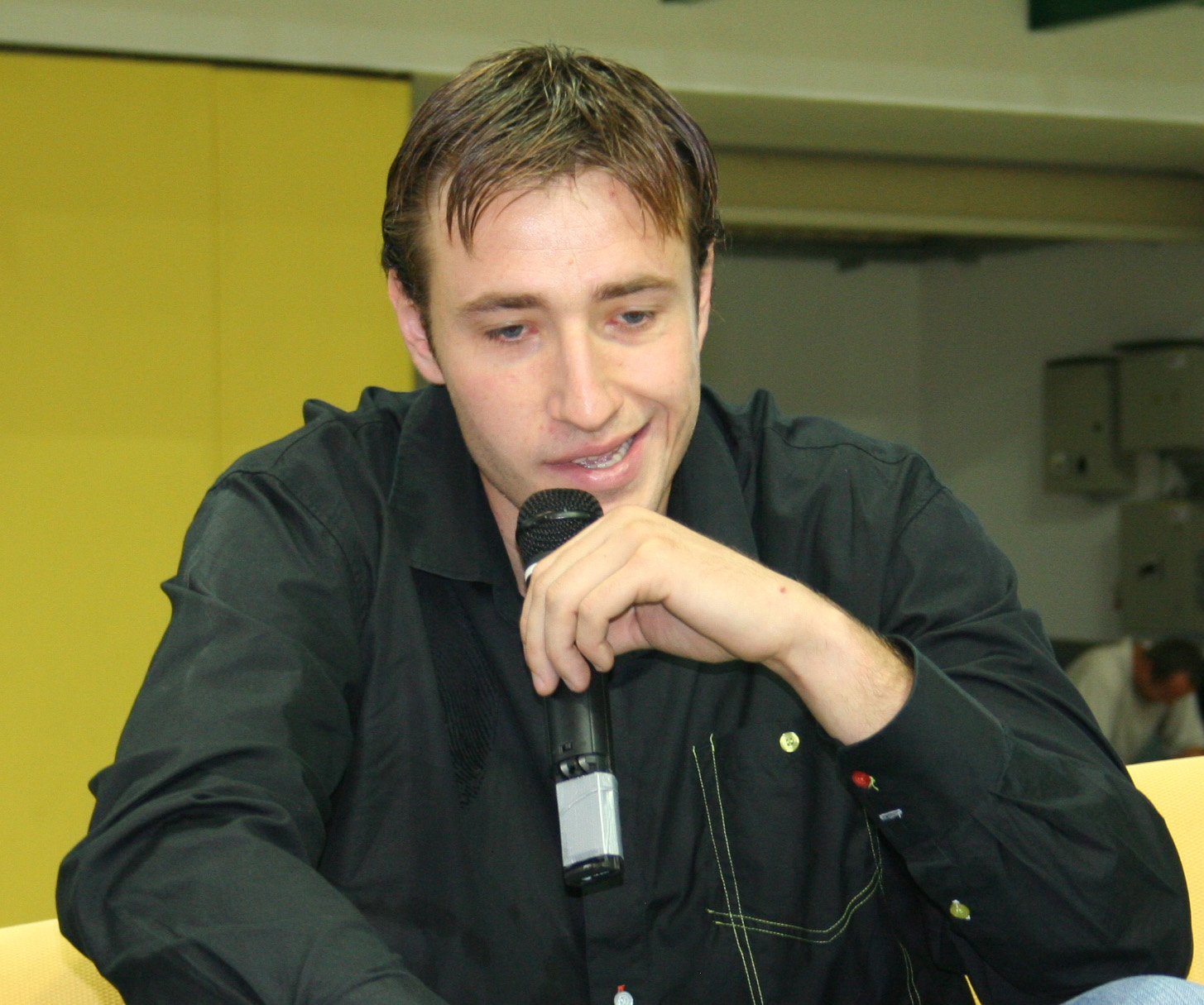

Matjaž or Matjaz is a given name. It may refer to:

- King Matjaž, legendary king in Slovenia, as well as Croatia and elsewhere
- Matjaž Brumen (born 1982), Slovenian handball player
- Matjaž Ceraj (born 1983), Slovenian judoka
- Matjaž Cvikl (1967–1999), Slovenian footballer who played in a forward role
- Matjaž Debelak (born 1965), Slovenian ski jumper
- Matjaž Florijančič (born 1967), former Slovenian football player
- Matjaz Godina (1768–1835), Slovene Lutheran pastor, writer and teacher in Hungary
- Matjaž Han, Slovenian politician
- Matjaž Kek (born 1961), former Slovenian footballer and a coach
- Matjaž Klopčič (1934–2007), Slovenian film director and screenwriter
- Matjaž Kopitar (born 1965), retired Slovenian professional ice hockey player
- Matjaž Kozelj (born 1970), retired male butterfly swimmer from Slovenia
- Matjaž Markič (born 1983), male breaststroke swimmer from Slovenia
- Matjaž Mlakar (born 1981), professional handball player
- Matjaž Perc (born 1979), Slovenian physicist
- Matjaž Pograjc (born 1967, theatre director and one of Slovenia's most prominent theatre artists
- Matjaž Rozman (born 1987), Slovenian footballer
- Matjaž Schmidt (1948–2010), Slovene artist and illustrator, known for children's books illustrations
- Matjaž Sekelj (born 1960), retired Slovenian professional ice hockey player
- Matjaž Šinkovec (born 1951), Slovenian diplomat, politician, translator, journalist and science fiction writer
- Matjaž Smodiš (born 1979), Slovenian professional basketball player
- Matjaž Vrhovnik (born 1972), former Slovenian former alpine skier
- Matjaž Zupan (born 1966), Slovene ski jumper

== See also ==
- Matijevac
- Mätja
- Matazu
