= Jan Muršak =

Slovenian ice hockey player (born 1988)

- Muršak with EC KAC in 2026
- Born: 20 January 1988 (age 38) Maribor, SR Slovenia, Yugoslavia
- Height: 5 ft 11 in (180 cm)
- Weight: 192 lb (87 kg; 13 st 10 lb)
- Position: Left wing
- Shoots: Right
- ICEHL team Former teams: EC KAC; HDK Maribor; Detroit Red Wings; HDD Olimpija Ljubljana; Amur Khabarovsk; CSKA Moscow; Torpedo Nizhny Novgorod; SC Bern; Frölunda HC
- National team: Slovenia
- NHL draft: 182nd overall, 2006; Detroit Red Wings
- Playing career: 2004–present
- Website: JanMursak.com

Jan Muršak (born 20 January 1988) is a Slovenian professional ice hockey player for EC KAC of the ICE Hockey League (ICEHL). Muršak first played hockey in Slovenia as a member of HDK Maribor before he left to spend one season in the Czech junior league. He was then selected by the Detroit Red Wings in the 2006 NHL entry draft and moved to the major junior Ontario Hockey League (OHL) and played for two teams, the Saginaw Spirit and Belleville Bulls. After finishing his junior career Muršak then joined the Red Wings American Hockey League (AHL) affiliate, the Grand Rapids Griffins in 2008.

== Playing career ==
=== European career and juniors ===
Muršak developed his skills in his hometown ice hockey club HDK Maribor where he played until the age of 17. As a youth, he played in the 2001 and 2002 Quebec International Pee-Wee Hockey Tournaments with a team from Slovenia. He later transferred to Czech club HC Ceské Budejovice for which he played for a season in CZE-U20 youth development league.

In 2006 he was selected by the Detroit Red Wings as the 182nd overall draft pick (6th round). During the same year Muršak was drafted by the Saginaw Spirit in 1st Round of the 2006 CHL Import Draft, 33rd overall. He had a successful first season for Saginaw which earned him a playoff call up for the Grand Rapids Griffins, AHL affiliate to the Detroit Red Wings. In his second OHL season, Muršak was traded from the Saginaw Spirit, to the Belleville Bulls where he stayed until the end of the season, before moving on to play regularly for Grand Rapids in the AHL.

=== Detroit Red Wings ===
Muršak signed a contract with the Detroit Red Wings in April 2007. Since his draft in 2006 he has made appearances for the Red Wings during training camps. On 26 December 2010 it was announced by Detroit that Muršak was called up to the team to fill in after an ankle injury of Danny Cleary. He made his NHL career debut on 28 December 2010 in a game against the Colorado Avalanche, thus becoming the second Slovenian, after Anže Kopitar of the Los Angeles Kings, to play in the NHL. Muršak scored his first NHL goal on 10 January 2011, also in a game against the Avalanche against Peter Budaj. On 17 February 2011, Muršak signed a new two-year contract with the Red Wings.

Due to the 2012 NHL lockout, Muršak signed a temporary contract with the Slovenian hockey team HDD Olimpija Ljubljana of the EBEL league. In 30 games with Olimpija, he excelled with 48 points, before returning for the start of the shortened 2012–13 season with the Red Wings. On opening night, he was again setback by injury, after hurting his collarbone in a 6–0 defeat against the St. Louis Blues.

On his return to health, and with limited opportunity with the Red Wings, Muršak was placed on waivers on 22 February 2013. He was assigned to the Griffins for the remainder of the season.

=== Return to Europe ===
As an impending free agent, Mursak subsequently moved to Amur Khabarovsk of the Kontinental Hockey League.

After re-establishing his offensive presence in 3 1/2 seasons with CSKA Moscow, Muršak left the club as a free agent and opted to continue in the KHL in signing a one-year contract with Torpedo Nizhny Novgorod on May 1, 2017.

Mursak then played for Frolunda HC in the SHL in the 2017-18 season, and scored a brace on his first team game debut against HV71 on January 11, 2018. Mursak then played for SC Bern in the NL, but after two seasons with Bern, including a league championship season in 2018-19, he returned to Frölunda.

After three seasons in Sweden, Mursak moved to Klagenfurt Athletic Sports Club or EC KAC in the ICE Hockey League for the 2023–24 seasone.

== International play ==
Muršak was chosen to compete on the Slovenia national junior team in the 2008 World Junior Ice Hockey Championships (Division I) in Latvia, where he scored one goal and two assists and was named the best forward of the tournament. He made his debut for the Slovenian senior team at the 2010 Division I Championships, held in the Slovenian capital, Ljubljana. In 2014, Muršak represented Slovenia at their first appearance at the Olympics. Muršak also represented Slovenia at the 2018 Winter Olympics in Pyeonchang, most notably coming on as a substitute in the last minutes of the game against USA, and scoring two late goals to win them the game.

== Career statistics ==
=== Regular season and playoffs ===
			Regular season					Playoffs
Season	Team	League	GP	G	A	Pts	PIM	GP	G	A	Pts	PIM
2002–03	HDK Maribor	SVN U18	13	27	18	45	14	—	—	—	—	—
2003–04	HDK Maribor	SVN U18	22	27	17	44	14	—	—	—	—	—
2003–04	HDK Maribor	SVN U20	17	6	4	10	12	2	2	4	6	25
2003–04	HDK Maribor	SVN	14	3	3	6	16	—	—	—	—	—
2004–05	HDK Maribor	SVN U20	17	12	12	24	35	2	5	4	9	4
2004–05	HDK Maribor	SVN	24	16	29	45	10	—	—	—	—	—
2005–06	HC České Budějovice	CZE U20	43	15	15	30	32	5	0	2	2	2
2006–07	Saginaw Spirit	OHL	62	27	53	80	50	6	1	2	3	10
2006–07	Grand Rapids Griffins	AHL	—	—	—	—	—	7	0	2	2	2
2007–08	Saginaw Spirit	OHL	26	6	20	26	15	—	—	—	—	—
2007–08	Belleville Bulls	OHL	31	11	27	38	8	21	9	15	24	10
2008–09	Grand Rapids Griffins	AHL	51	2	7	9	25	6	0	1	1	0
2009–10	Grand Rapids Griffins	AHL	79	24	18	42	46	—	—	—	—	—
2010–11	Grand Rapids Griffins	AHL	54	13	22	35	35	—	—	—	—	—
2010–11	Detroit Red Wings	NHL	19	1	0	1	4	—	—	—	—	—
2011–12	Grand Rapids Griffins	AHL	6	0	1	1	2	—	—	—	—	—
2011–12	Detroit Red Wings	NHL	25	1	2	3	0	—	—	—	—	—
2012–13	HDD Olimpija Ljubljana	EBEL	30	19	29	48	9	—	—	—	—	—
2012–13	Grand Rapids Griffins	AHL	23	4	12	16	12	23	11	6	17	23
2012–13	Detroit Red Wings	NHL	2	0	0	0	4	—	—	—	—	—
2013–14	Amur Khabarovsk	KHL	36	12	9	21	28	—	—	—	—	—
2013–14	CSKA Moscow	KHL	13	0	4	4	27	4	0	1	1	7
2014–15	CSKA Moscow	KHL	53	17	26	43	20	16	3	7	10	2
2015–16	CSKA Moscow	KHL	51	14	22	36	30	8	0	0	0	4
2016–17	CSKA Moscow	KHL	33	6	13	19	57	9	1	2	3	11
2017–18	Torpedo Nizhny Novgorod	KHL	13	0	1	1	18	—	—	—	—	—
2017–18	Frölunda HC	SHL	15	10	10	20	4	6	0	3	3	0
2018–19	SC Bern	NL	32	10	11	21	24	15	5	5	10	10
2019–20	SC Bern	NL	42	9	16	25	24	—	—	—	—	—
2020–21	Frölunda HC	SHL	48	8	17	25	36	7	2	1	3	8
2021–22	Frölunda HC	SHL	47	9	9	18	14	8	3	2	5	27
2022–23	Frölunda HC	SHL	40	8	11	19	39	12	0	4	4	6
2023–24	EC KAC	ICEHL	38	15	32	47	50	17	3	12	15	6
2024–25	EC KAC	ICEHL	33	13	24	37	32	2	0	0	0	0
2025–26	EC KAC	ICEHL	37	12	25	37	22	6	2	4	6	4
NHL totals			46	2	2	4	8	—	—	—	—	—
ICEHL totals			138	59	110	169	78	25	5	16	21	10
KHL totals			199	49	75	124	180	37	4	10	14	24
SHL totals			200	35	47	82	93	33	5	10	15	41
NL totals			74	19	27	46	48	15	5	5	10	10

=== International ===
Year	Team	Comp	GP	G	A	Pts	PIM
2005	Slovenia	WJC18 (Div I)	5	1	2	3	4
2006	Slovenia	WJC (Div I)	5	3	2	5	2
2006	Slovenia	WJC18 (Div I)	5	1	1	2	8
2007	Slovenia	WJC (Div I)	5	3	2	5	10
2008	Slovenia	WJC (Div I)	5	1	2	3	0
2010	Slovenia	WC (Div I)	5	5	2	7	2
2014	Slovenia	OG	5	1	2	3	4
2014	Slovenia	WC (Div IA)	5	1	2	3	2
2015	Slovenia	WC	6	1	0	1	2
2016	Slovenia	OGQ	3	1	1	2	0
2017	Slovenia	WC	7	3	1	4	8
2018	Slovenia	OG	4	3	3	6	0
Junior totals			25	9	9	18	24
Senior totals			35	15	11	26	18

== Awards and honours ==
Award	Year
OHL
Second All-Rookie Team	2007
AHL
Calder Cup (Grand Rapids Griffins)	2013
NL
Champion (SC Bern)	2019
International
Best Forward (IIHF U20 Championships Division IB)	2008
