= Gašper Kopitar =

Slovenian ice hockey player

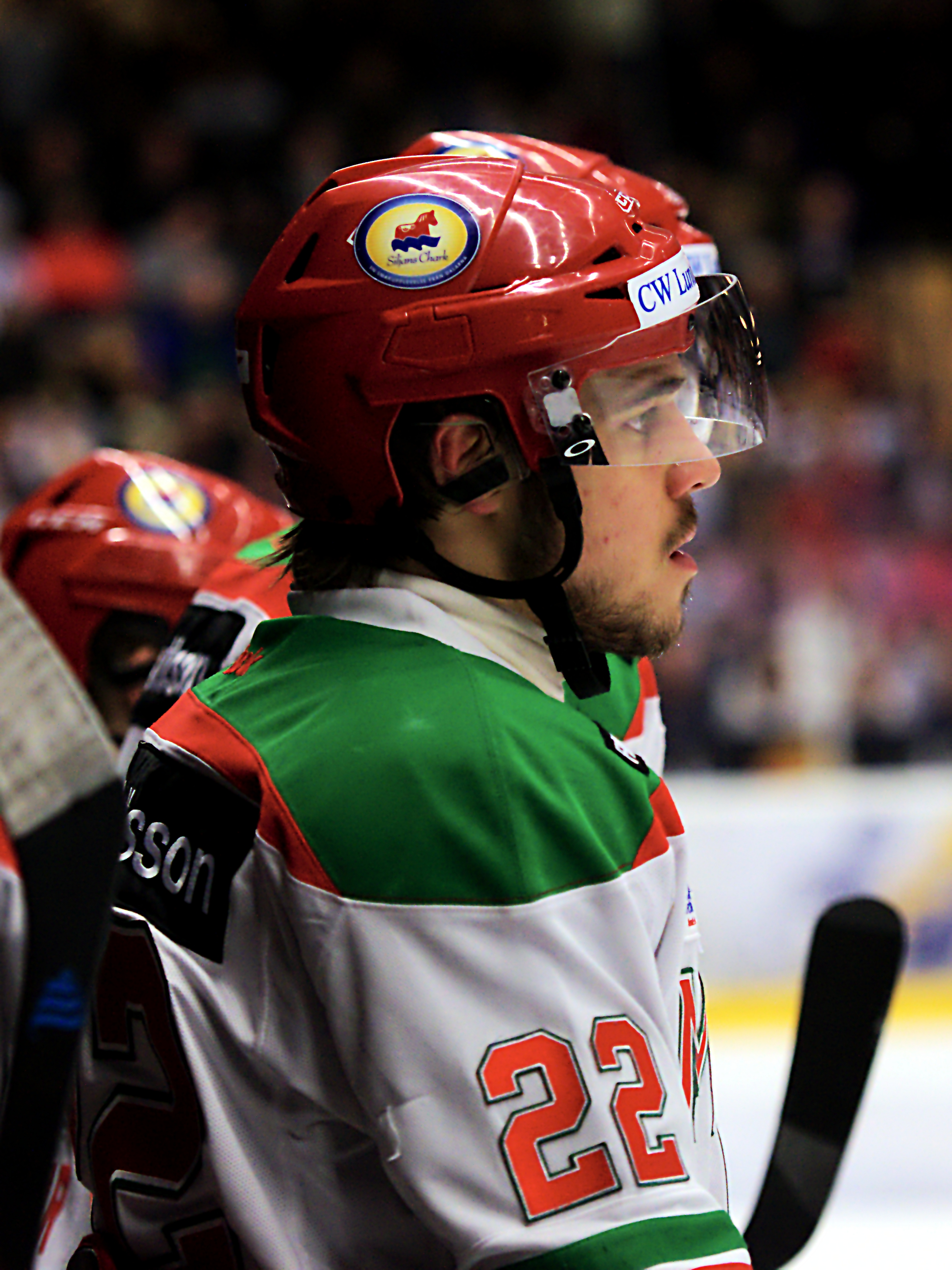
- Born: 13 August 1992 (age 33) Jesenice, Slovenia
- Height: 6 ft 1 in (185 cm)
- Weight: 198 lb (90 kg; 14 st 2 lb)
- Position: Left wing
- Shot: Right
- Played for: Mora IK; Ontario Reign; Manchester Monarchs
- National team: Slovenia
- NHL draft: Undrafted
- Playing career: 2012–2018

Gašper Kopitar (born 13 August 1992), is a Slovenian former professional ice hockey player who last played with the Manchester Monarchs of the ECHL. He is the younger brother of Anže Kopitar, who until 2026 served as the captain of the Los Angeles Kings of the National Hockey League.

== Playing career ==
Kopitar was born in Jesenice, to Matjaž and Mateja Kopitar. In his youth, Kopitar played for the youth team of his hometown, HK Acroni Jesenice. In 2008, he moved to the USA and played the rest of his junior years there. On 25 April 2012, he began his senior career when he signed a contract in Europe with Swedish club Mora IK of the HockeyAllsvenskan. In December 2013 he signed a contract with the Ontario Reign of the ECHL. Kopitar scored his first goal with the Reign on 5 January 2014 against the San Francisco Bulls, winning the game 3-2 in overtime.

On 1 October 2014, Kopitar agreed to return to the Reign, signing a standard player contract for the 2014–15 season.

On 28 July 2015, Kopitar remained within the Los Angeles Kings' ECHL affiliate, signing a one-year contract with the Manchester Monarchs.

Kopitar remained within the Kings' ECHL affiliates through parts of six seasons. Suffering from prolonged injury, which ruled him out of the entire 2017–18 season, Kopitar returned to play in 7 games in the following 2018–19 season before opting to end his professional career and announce his immediate retirement on 5 December 2018.

== International play ==
Kopitar played in his first senior tournament for his country in 2013, when he participated in the Olympic Qualifying Tournament, which Slovenia won.

== Career statistics ==
=== Regular season and playoffs ===
			Regular season					Playoffs
Season	Team	League	GP	G	A	Pts	PIM	GP	G	A	Pts	PIM
2008–09	Los Angeles Jr. Kings U18	T1EHL U18	46	8	12	20	14	—	—	—	—	—
2009–10	Portland Winterhawks	WHL	10	0	0	0	0	—	—	—	—	—
2010–11	Portland Winterhawks	WHL	2	1	0	1	0	—	—	—	—	—
2010–11	Des Moines Buccaneers	USHL	55	12	12	24	45	—	—	—	—	—
2011–12	Des Moines Buccaneers	USHL	52	24	15	39	16	4	0	0	0	0
2012–13	Mora IK	J20	2	0	2	2	2	—	—	—	—	—
2012–13	Mora IK	Allsv	42	8	6	14	4	—	—	—	—	—
2013–14	Mora IK	J20	1	1	1	2	0	—	—	—	—	—
2013–14	Mora IK	Allsv	13	0	0	0	2	—	—	—	—	—
2013–14	Ontario Reign	ECHL	32	8	12	20	4	4	0	1	1	0
2014–15	Ontario Reign	ECHL	41	11	14	25	17	19	0	2	2	0
2015–16	Manchester Monarchs	ECHL	57	9	24	33	2	2	0	1	1	0
2016–17	Manchester Monarchs	ECHL	42	7	12	19	6	—	—	—	—	—
2018–19	Manchester Monarchs	ECHL	7	0	1	1	0	—	—	—	—	—
Allsv totals			55	8	6	14	6	—	—	—	—	—
ECHL totals			179	35	63	98	29	25	0	4	4	0

=== International ===
Year	Team	Event	GP	G	A	Pts	PIM
2010	Slovenia	WJC-D1	5	0	1	1	4
2011	Slovenia	WJC-D1	5	2	2	4	2
2012	Slovenia	WJC-D1	5	3	2	5	4
2014	Slovenia	Oly	3	0	0	0	0
2013	Slovenia	WC	4	0	1	1	0
Junior totals			15	5	5	10	10
Senior totals			7	0	1	1	0
