= Nik Zupančič =

Slovenian ice hockey player

- Born: October 3, 1968 (age 56); Ljubljana, SFR Yugoslavia
- Height: 6 ft 1 in (185 cm)
- Weight: 203 lb (92 kg; 14 st 7 lb)
- Position: Forward
- Shot: Right
- Played for: HDD Olimpija Ljubljana; KHL Medveščak Zagreb; HKMK Bled; VEU Feldkirch; JYP Jyväskylä; Timrå IK; HK Acroni Jesenice; EHC Lustenau; Dornbirner EC; EV Aicall Zeltweg; EC Weiz
- National team: Slovenia
- Playing career: 1984–2010

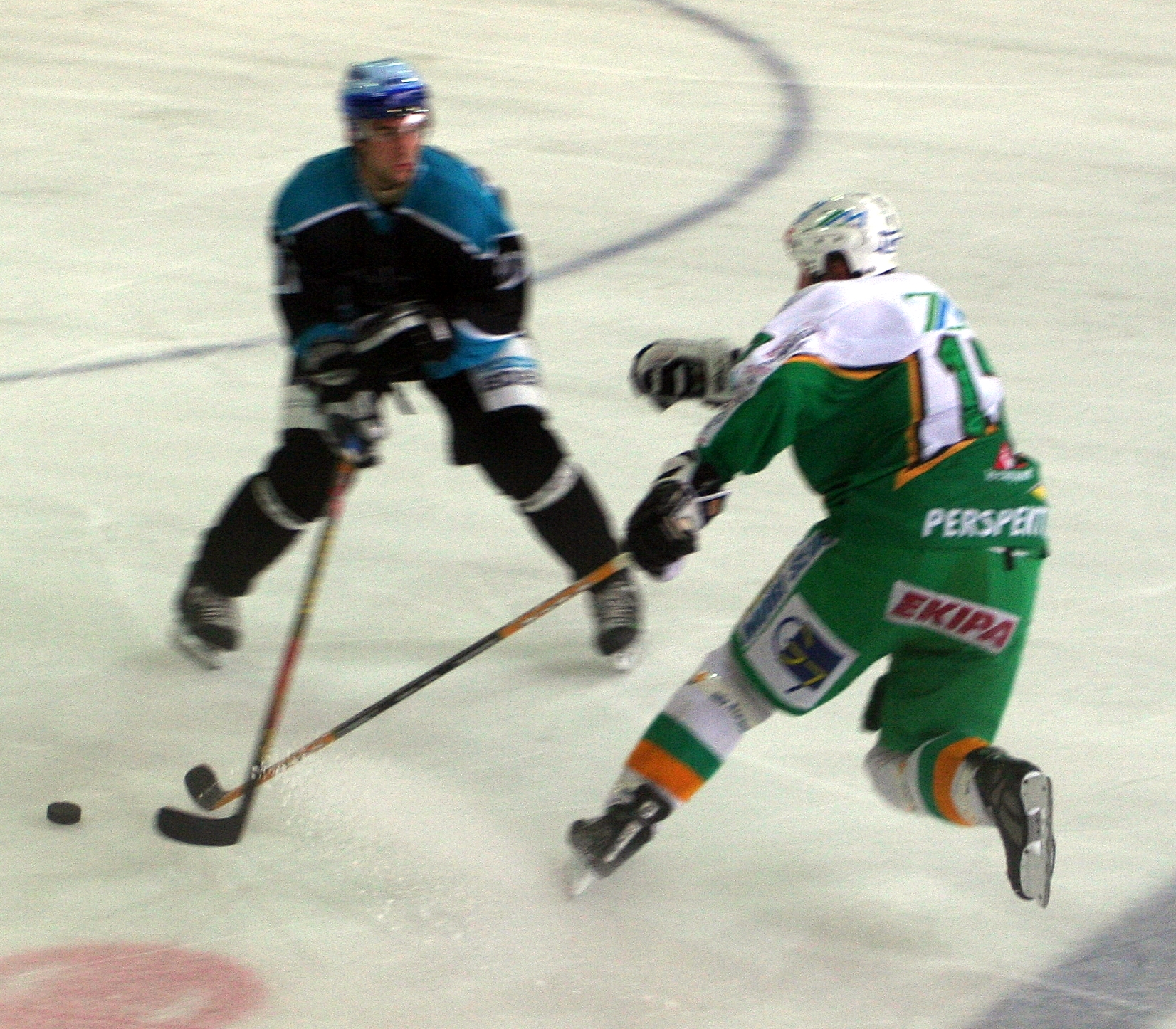
Nik Zupančič crop.jpg

Nik Zupančič (born October 3, 1968) is a former Slovenian ice hockey player.
