= Slovenia men's national ice hockey team =

Slovenia
- Nickname: Risi (The Lynx)
- Association: Ice Hockey Federation of Slovenia
- General manager: Dejan Kontrec
- Head coach: Edo Terglav
- Assistants: Gorazd Drinovec; Andrej Tavželj
- Captain: Robert Sabolič
- Team colors
- IIHF code: SLO
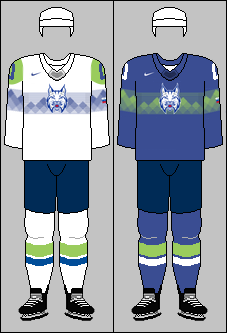

Ranking
- Current IIHF: 13 (▲2) (3 June 2026)
- Highest IIHF: 13 (2026)
- Lowest IIHF: 20 (2020–21)

First international
- Austria 1–0 Slovenia (Klagenfurt, Austria; 20 March 1992)

Biggest win
- Slovenia 29–0 South Africa (Ljubljana, Slovenia; 15 March 1993)

Biggest defeat
- Finland 12–0 Slovenia (Tampere, Finland; 28 April 2003)

Olympics
- Appearances: 2 (first in 2014)

IIHF World Championships
- Appearances: 32 (first in 1993)
- Best result: 13th (2002, 2005, 2025, 2026)

The Slovenia men's national ice hockey team is the ice hockey team representing Slovenia internationally. It is governed by the Ice Hockey Federation of Slovenia. As of June 2026, Slovenia is ranked 13th in the world by the IIHF World Ranking. The team's biggest success is reaching the quarter-finals at the 2014 Winter Olympics. Their best record at the Ice Hockey World Championships is 13th place, achieved in 2002, 2005, 2025 and 2026.

Seven players from Slovenia have been drafted into the National Hockey League (NHL) since 1998; Anže Kopitar and Jan Muršak have played in the league.

== History ==
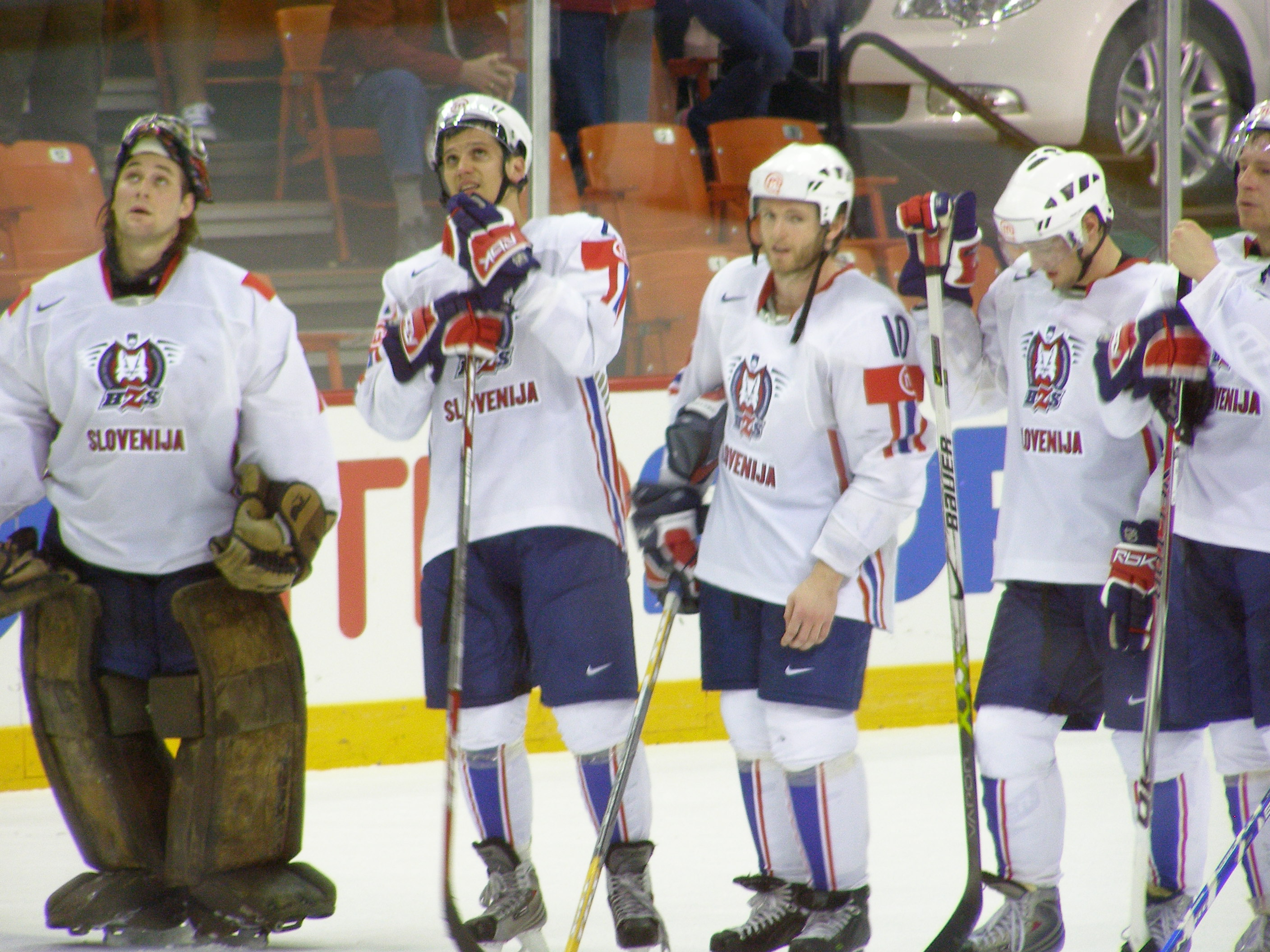
Slovenian players at the 2008 World Championship

Before Slovenia's independence, Slovenian hockey players played for the Yugoslavia national team. From 1939, when Yugoslavia took part in its first World Championship, to 1991, when the country disintegrated, 91% of all Yugoslav national team members were Slovenes, including the entire squad that represented Yugoslavia at the 1984 Winter Olympics in Sarajevo.

Slovenia declared independence from Yugoslavia in 1991, and joined the International Ice Hockey Federation the following year. They first played as an independent nation at the 1993 World Championship, hosting the Group C tournament, the lowest tier. They played in the elite division for the first time in 2002, and at their first Winter Olympics in 2014.

== Tournament record ==
=== Olympic Games ===
Year	Round	Position	Pld	W	OTW	OTL	L	GF	GA
1964–1991	Part of Yugoslavia								
(France) 1992	Did not enter								
(Norway) 1994	Did not enter								
(Japan) 1998	Did not qualify								
(United States) 2002	Did not qualify								
(Italy) 2006	Did not qualify								
(Canada) 2010	Did not qualify								
(Russia) 2014	Quarter-finals	7th	5	2	0	0	3	10	16
(South Korea) 2018	Playoffs	9th	4	0	2	1	1	9	14
(China) 2022	Did not qualify								
(Italy) 2026	Did not qualify								
Total		0 Titles	9	2	2	1	4	19	30

=== World Championship ===
Key
▲	Promoted to higher division
▼	Relegated to lower division

Championship	Pld	W	OTW	T	OTL	L	GF	GA	Coach	Captain	Position
1920 – 1992	Part of Yugoslavia										
(Slovenia) 1993 Bled and Ljubljana, Pool C	7	5	0	0	0	2	78	16	(Slovenia) Rudi Hiti	Drago Mlinarec	4th in Pool C
(Slovakia) 1994 Poprad and Spišská Nová Ves, Pool C	6	2	0	0	0	4	26	27	(Slovenia) Rudi Hiti	Marjan Gorenc	5th in Pool C
(Bulgaria) 1995 Sofia, Pool C	4	2	0	0	0	2	28	15	(Slovenia) Rudi Hiti	Tomaž Vnuk	7th in Pool C
(Slovenia) 1996 Jesenice and Kranj, Pool C	7	5	0	0	0	2	41	19	(Russia) Vladimir Krikunov	Nik Zupančič	3rd in Pool C
(Estonia) 1997 Tallinn and Kohtla-Järve, Pool C	5	3	0	1	0	1	25	8	(Slovenia) Pavle Kavčič	Tomaž Vnuk	2nd in Pool C
(Slovenia) 1998 Ljubljana and Jesenice, Pool B	7	5	0	1	0	1	28	15	(Slovenia) Pavle Kavčič	Bojan Zajc	2nd in Pool B
(Denmark) 1999 Odense and Rodovre, Pool B	7	2	0	1	0	4	14	17	(Slovenia) Pavle Kavčič	Tomaž Vnuk	5th in Pool B
(Poland) 2000 Katowice, Pool B	7	0	0	2	0	5	16	31	(Slovenia) Rudi Hiti	Nik Zupančič	7th in Pool B
(Slovenia) 2001 Ljubljana, Division IB	5	4	0	1	0	0	44	6	(Slovenia) Matjaž Sekelj	Tomaž Vnuk	1st in Division IB ▲
(Sweden) 2002 Gothenburg, Karlstad, Jönköping	6	3	0	0	0	3	18	26	(Slovenia) Matjaž Sekelj	Tomaž Vnuk	13th
(Finland) 2003 Helsinki, Tampere, Turku	6	0	0	1	0	5	12	37	(Slovenia) Matjaž Sekelj	Tomaž Vnuk	15th ▼
(Poland) 2004 Gdańsk, Division IB	5	5	0	0	0	0	33	5	(Finland) Kari Savolainen	Tomaž Vnuk	1st in Division IB ▲
(Austria) 2005 Vienna, Innsbruck	6	2	0	0	0	4	12	32	(Finland) Kari Savolainen	Robert Ciglenečki	13th
(Latvia) 2006 Riga	6	0	0	2	0	4	14	26	(Czech Republic) František Výborný	Dejan Varl	16th ▼
(Slovenia) 2007 Ljubljana, Division IB	5	5	0	—	0	0	29	5	(United States) Ted Sator	Marcel Rodman	1st in Division IB ▲
(Canada) 2008 Quebec City, Halifax	5	0	0	—	1	4	6	22	(Sweden) Mats Waltin	Marcel Rodman	15th ▼
(Lithuania) 2009 Vilnius, Division IA	5	4	0	—	0	1	21	7	(United States) John Harrington	Tomaž Razingar	2nd in Division IA
(Slovenia) 2010 Ljubljana, Division IB	5	4	1	—	0	0	29	10	(United States) John Harrington	Tomaž Razingar	1st in Division IB ▲
(Slovakia) 2011 Bratislava, Košice	6	1	0	—	1	4	15	24	(Slovenia) Matjaž Kopitar	Tomaž Razingar	16th ▼
(Slovenia) 2012 Ljubljana, Division IA	5	5	0	—	0	0	17	9	(Slovenia) Matjaž Kopitar	Tomaž Razingar	1st in Division IA ▲
(Sweden) (Finland) 2013 Stockholm, Helsinki	7	0	0	—	2	5	12	27	(Slovenia) Matjaž Kopitar	Tomaž Razingar	16th ▼
(South Korea) 2014 Goyang, Division IA	5	4	0	—	0	1	15	6	(Slovenia) Matjaž Kopitar	Tomaž Razingar	1st in Division IA ▲
(Czech Republic) 2015 Prague, Ostrava	7	1	0	—	0	6	9	22	(Slovenia) Matjaž Kopitar	Tomaž Razingar	16th ▼
(Poland) 2016 Katowice, Division IA	5	4	0	—	0	1	18	8	(Slovenia) Nik Zupančič	Jan Urbas	1st in Division IA ▲
(Germany) (France) 2017 Cologne, Paris	7	0	0	—	1	6	13	36	(Slovenia) Nik Zupančič	Jan Muršak	15th ▼
(Hungary) 2018 Budapest, Division IA	5	2	0	—	0	3	15	15	(Finland) Kari Savolainen	Jan Urbas	5th in Division IA
(Kazakhstan) 2019 Nur-Sultan, Division IA	5	2	0	—	0	3	21	12	(Slovenia) Ivo Jan	Anže Kopitar	4th in Division IA
(Slovenia) 2020 Ljubljana, Division IA	Cancelled due to the COVID-19 pandemic										
(Slovenia) 2021 Ljubljana, Division IA	Cancelled due to the COVID-19 pandemic										
(Slovenia) 2022 Ljubljana, Division IA	4	4	0	—	0	0	22	5	(Slovenia) Matjaž Kopitar	Mitja Robar	1st in Division IA ▲
(Finland) (Latvia) 2023 Tampere, Riga	7	0	0	—	0	7	9	27	(Slovenia) Matjaž Kopitar	Jan Urbas	16th ▼
(Italy) 2024 Bolzano, Division IA	5	3	0	—	0	2	14	8	(Slovenia) Edo Terglav	Robert Sabolič	2nd in Division IA ▲
(Sweden) (Denmark) 2025 Stockholm, Herning	7	1	0	—	1	5	9	29	(Slovenia) Edo Terglav	Robert Sabolič	13th
(Switzerland) 2026 Zürich, Fribourg	7	1	1	—	1	4	13	25	(Slovenia) Edo Terglav	Robert Sabolič	13th
(Germany) 2027 Düsseldorf, Mannheim				—							

== Team ==
=== Current roster ===
Roster for the 2026 IIHF World Championship.

Head coach: Edo Terglav

No.	Pos.	Name	Height	Weight	Birthdate	Team
6	D	Miha Štebih	1.90 m (6 ft 3 in)	92 kg (203 lb)	7 April 1992 (age 34)	(Czech Republic) SK Horácká Slavia Třebíč
8	F	Marcel Mahkovec	1.80 m (5 ft 11 in)	84 kg (185 lb)	17 December 2003 (age 22)	(Slovenia) HK Olimpija
10	F	Miha Beričič	1.93 m (6 ft 4 in)	88 kg (194 lb)	15 April 2004 (age 22)	(Slovenia) HK Olimpija
12	F	Nik Simšič	1.80 m (5 ft 11 in)	86 kg (190 lb)	12 March 1997 (age 29)	(Slovenia) HK Olimpija
13	F	Nace Langus	1.86 m (6 ft 1 in)	87 kg (192 lb)	5 December 2004 (age 21)	(United States) Augustana Vikings
15	D	Blaž Gregorc – A	1.90 m (6 ft 3 in)	95 kg (209 lb)	18 January 1990 (age 36)	(Slovenia) HK Olimpija
17	D	Jan Goličič	1.96 m (6 ft 5 in)	93 kg (205 lb)	30 June 2006 (age 20)	(Canada) Blainville-Boisbriand Armada
18	F	Ken Ograjenšek	1.75 m (5 ft 9 in)	81 kg (179 lb)	30 August 1991 (age 34)	(Austria) Steinbach Black Wings Linz
21	F	Jan Drozg	1.85 m (6 ft 1 in)	85 kg (187 lb)	1 April 1999 (age 27)	(Slovenia) HK Olimpija
23	F	Jaka Sodja	1.76 m (5 ft 9 in)	85 kg (187 lb)	17 December 1999 (age 26)	(Slovenia) HK Olimpija
24	F	Rok Tičar – A	1.79 m (5 ft 10 in)	80 kg (180 lb)	3 May 1989 (age 37)	(Italy) HC Pustertal Wölfe
25	F	Luka Maver	1.90 m (6 ft 3 in)	87 kg (192 lb)	25 October 1997 (age 28)	(Austria) Steinbach Black Wings Linz
26	D	Maks Perčič	1.87 m (6 ft 2 in)	92 kg (203 lb)	2 April 2004 (age 22)	(Czech Republic) HC Slavia Praha
29	D	Aleksandar Magovac	1.81 m (5 ft 11 in)	91 kg (201 lb)	9 February 1991 (age 35)	(France) Gothiques d'Amiens
30	G	Luka Kolin	1.83 m (6 ft 0 in)	75 kg (165 lb)	24 November 2003 (age 22)	(Slovenia) HK Olimpija
33	G	Žan Us	1.80 m (5 ft 11 in)	80 kg (180 lb)	10 June 1996 (age 30)	(Slovenia) HDD Jesenice
41	D	Jan Ćosić	1.78 m (5 ft 10 in)	80 kg (180 lb)	7 March 2003 (age 23)	(Slovenia) HK Olimpija
44	D	Aljoša Crnović	1.90 m (6 ft 3 in)	85 kg (187 lb)	16 April 1999 (age 27)	(Slovenia) HK Olimpija
46	F	Matic Török – A	1.80 m (5 ft 11 in)	86 kg (190 lb)	26 July 2003 (age 23)	(Finland) Ilves
49	F	Filip Sitar	1.80 m (5 ft 11 in)	85 kg (187 lb)	29 June 2005 (age 21)	(United States) RPI Engineers
55	F	Robert Sabolič – C	1.83 m (6 ft 0 in)	91 kg (201 lb)	18 September 1988 (age 37)	(Slovenia) HK Olimpija
61	G	Lukaš Horak	1.86 m (6 ft 1 in)	81 kg (179 lb)	5 October 1993 (age 32)	(Slovenia) HK Olimpija
86	D	Rožle Bohinc	1.88 m (6 ft 2 in)	80 kg (180 lb)	15 February 2004 (age 22)	(Slovenia) HK Olimpija
91	F	Žan Jezovšek	1.85 m (6 ft 1 in)	98 kg (216 lb)	22 April 1997 (age 29)	(Germany) EV Lindau Islanders
92	F	Anže Kuralt	1.75 m (5 ft 9 in)	80 kg (180 lb)	31 October 1991 (age 34)	(Hungary) Fehérvár AV19

=== Coaching history ===
- Rudi Hiti (1992–1995)
- Vladimir Krikunov (1995–1996)
- Pavle Kavčič (1996–1999)
- Rudi Hiti (1999–2000)
- Matjaž Sekelj (2001–2003)
- Kari Savolainen (2003–2005)
- František Výborný (2005–2006)
- Ted Sator (2006–2007)
- Mats Waltin (2007–2008)
- John Harrington (2009–2010)
- Matjaž Kopitar (2010–2015)
- Nik Zupančič (2015–2017)
- Kari Savolainen (2017–2018)
- Ivo Jan (2018–2019)
- Matjaž Kopitar (2019–2023)
- Edo Terglav (2023–present)

=== NHL entry draft ===
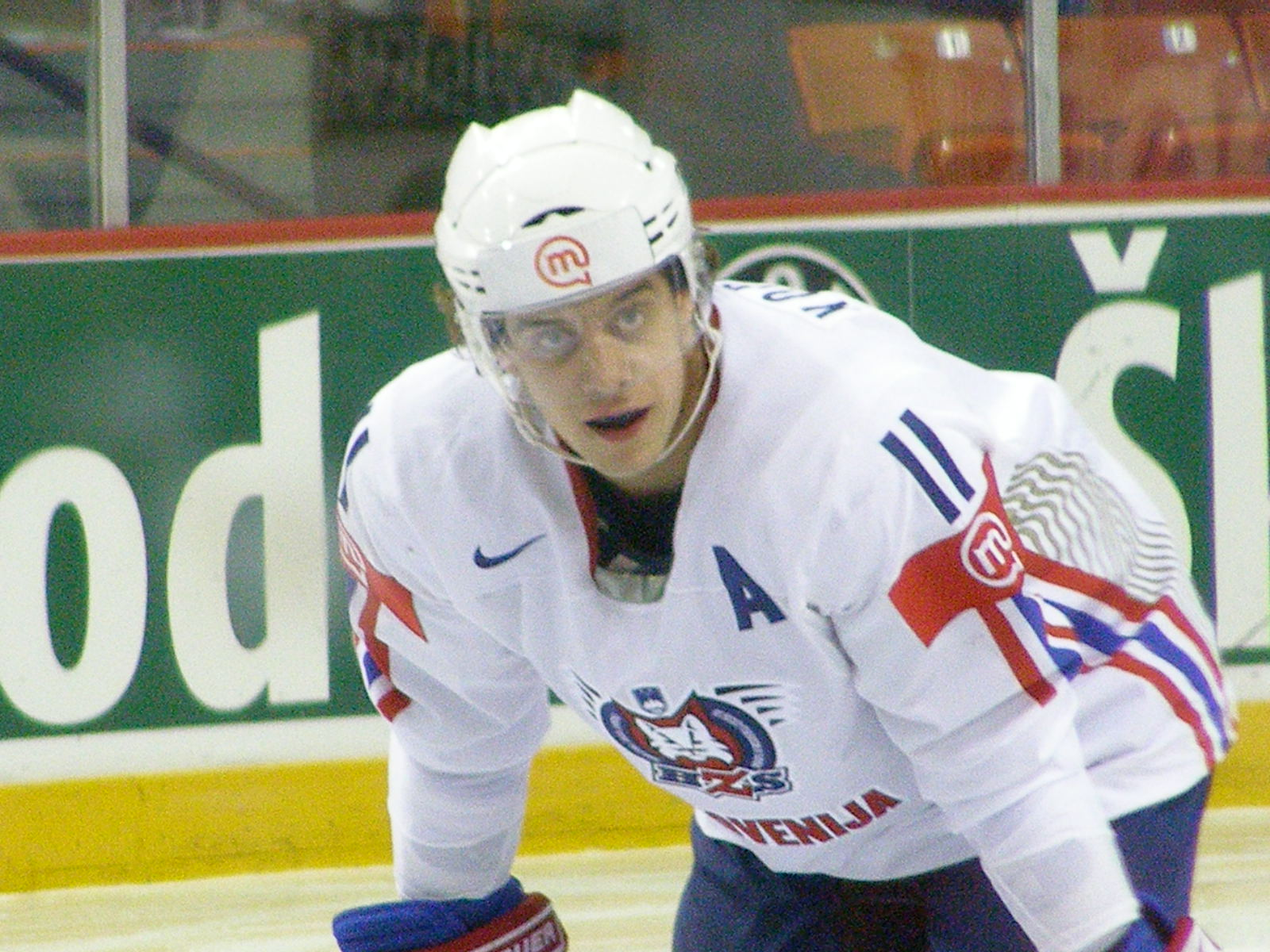
Two-time NHL champion Anže Kopitar at the 2008 World Championship

Players from Slovenia selected in the NHL entry draft.

Year	Name	Overall	Team
1998	Edo Terglav	249th overall	Buffalo Sabres
2000	Jure Penko	203rd overall	Nashville Predators
2001	Marcel Rodman	282nd overall	Boston Bruins
2005	Anže Kopitar	11th overall	Los Angeles Kings
2006	Jan Muršak	182nd overall	Detroit Red Wings
2017	Jan Drozg	152nd overall	Pittsburgh Penguins
2024	Jan Goličič	118th overall	Tampa Bay Lightning
