= Jan Urbas =

Slovenian ice hockey player (born 1989)

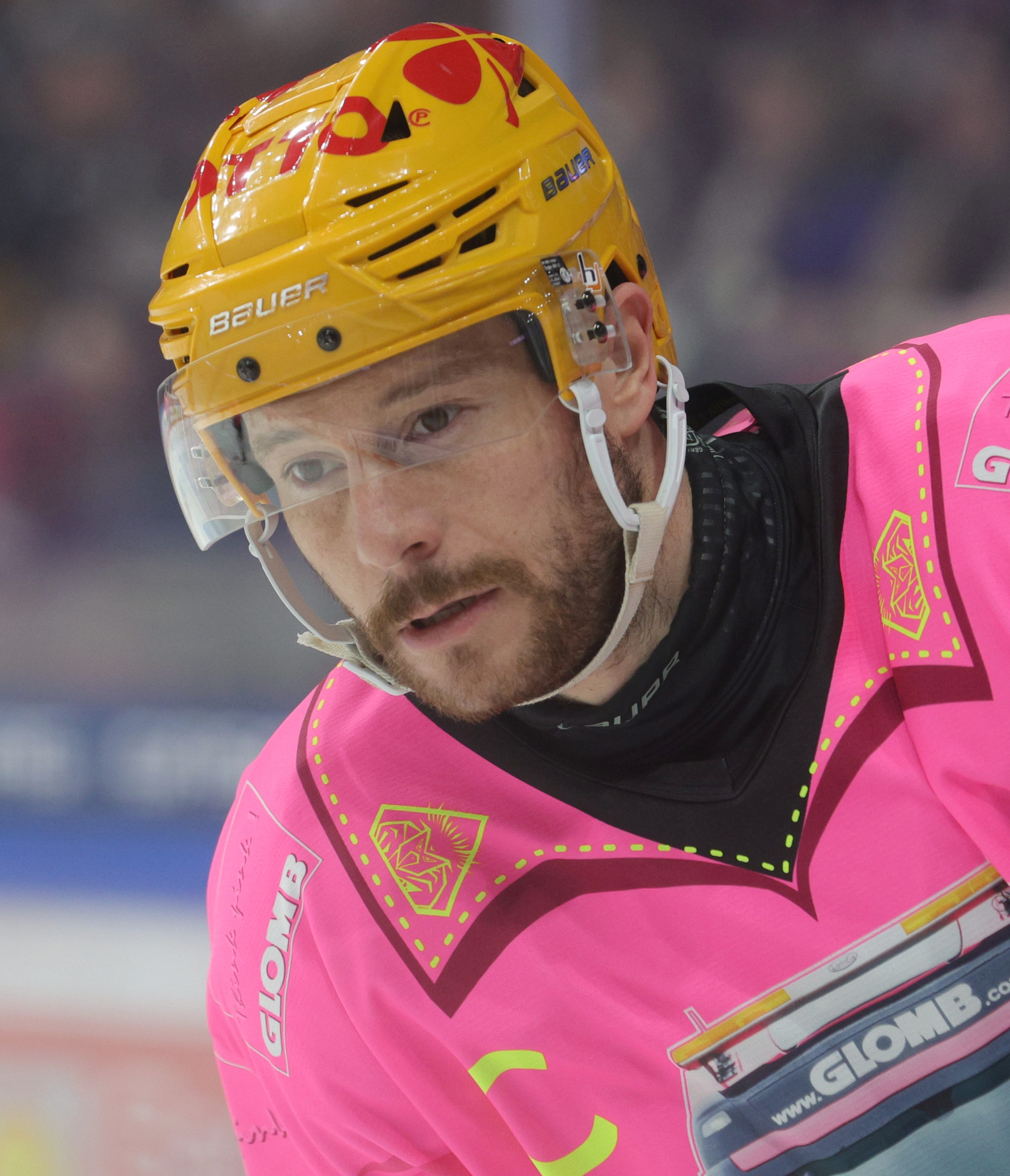
- Urbas in 2024
- Born: January 26, 1989 (age 37) Ljubljana, Yugoslavia
- Height: 6 ft 4 in (193 cm)
- Weight: 216 lb (98 kg; 15 st 6 lb)
- Position: Centre
- Shoots: Left
- DEL team Former teams: Fischtown Pinguins; HK Olimpija Ljubljana; Växjö Lakers; EHC München; EC KAC; VIK Västerås HK; EC VSV
- National team: Slovenia
- NHL draft: Undrafted
- Playing career: 2008–present

Jan Urbas (born January 26, 1989) is a Slovenian professional ice hockey player from Cerknica. He is currently playing with the Fischtown Pinguins in the Deutsche Eishockey Liga (DEL).

== Playing career ==
Urbas moved to Sweden as a junior to play for the Malmö Redhawks at youth and subsequently senior level.

He previously played with EHC München in the German Deutsche Eishockey Liga (DEL). On September 30, 2014, he opted to join EC KAC of the EBEL on a one-year contract. He played just 10 games with Klagenfurt in the 2014–15 season, before transferring to VIK Västerås HK of the HockeyAllsvenskan on March 11, 2015.

As a free agent after parts of two seasons with VIK in the Allsvenskan, Urbas returned to Austria to continue his professional career with EC VSV on July 14, 2016.

== Career statistics ==
=== Regular season and playoffs ===
			Regular season					Playoffs
Season	Team	League	GP	G	A	Pts	PIM	GP	G	A	Pts	PIM
2005–06	HK Olimpija	SVN	27	11	7	18	28	—	—	—	—	—
2006–07	Malmö Redhawks	J18	9	6	6	12	8	—	—	—	—	—
2006–07	HK Olimpija	SVN U20	—	—	—	—	—	6	7	4	11	18
2007–08	Malmö Redhawks	J20	38	15	17	32	16	7	1	3	4	0
2008–09	Malmö Redhawks	J20	28	13	13	26	69	—	—	—	—	—
2008–09	Malmö Redhawks	Allsv	19	2	1	3	4	—	—	—	—	—
2009–10	Malmö Redhawks	J20	1	1	0	1	2	—	—	—	—	—
2009–10	Malmö Redhawks	Allsv	42	17	10	27	12	5	1	0	1	2
2010–11	Malmö Redhawks	Allsv	23	12	4	16	10	—	—	—	—	—
2011–12	Växjö Lakers	SEL	2	0	0	0	0	—	—	—	—	—
2012–13	Växjö Lakers	SEL	52	4	3	7	4	—	—	—	—	—
2013–14	EHC Red Bull München	DEL	38	7	10	17	28	3	1	2	3	2
2014–15	EC KAC	AUT	10	4	1	5	2	—	—	—	—	—
2014–15	VIK Västerås HK	Allsv	31	10	14	24	4	8	0	2	2	2
2015–16	VIK Västerås HK	Allsv	52	15	17	32	16	—	—	—	—	—
2016–17	EC VSV	AUT	44	27	19	46	28	—	—	—	—	—
2017–18	Fischtown Penguins	DEL	50	21	20	41	26	7	4	3	7	16
2018–19	Fischtown Penguins	DEL	47	19	21	40	34	—	—	—	—	—
2019–20	Fischtown Penguins	DEL	50	27	21	48	20	—	—	—	—	—
2020–21	Fischtown Penguins	DEL	28	13	22	35	12	3	2	0	2	0
2021–22	Fischtown Penguins	DEL	55	25	30	55	37	5	1	2	3	4
2022–23	Fischtown Penguins	DEL	38	14	11	25	6	8	4	2	6	0
2023–24	Fischtown Penguins	DEL	47	21	31	52	16	14	7	3	10	4
2024–25	Fischtown Penguins	DEL	51	23	22	45	8	6	2	0	2	0
Allsv totals			167	56	46	102	46	13	1	2	3	4
DEL totals			404	170	188	358	187	46	21	12	33	26

=== International ===
Year	Team	Event	GP	G	A	Pts	PIM
2007	Slovenia	WJC18 D1	5	4	3	7	0
2008	Slovenia	WJC D1	5	1	1	2	0
2009	Slovenia	WJC D1	5	1	3	4	0
2010	Slovenia	WC D1	5	2	5	7	6
2013	Slovenia	OGQ	3	2	2	4	0
2013	Slovenia	WC	7	2	0	2	2
2014	Slovenia	OG	5	1	2	3	0
2014	Slovenia	WC D1A	5	5	2	7	2
2015	Slovenia	WC	5	1	0	1	2
2016	Slovenia	WC D1A	5	2	4	6	0
2016	Slovenia	OGQ	3	1	1	2	0
2017	Slovenia	WC	7	2	1	3	4
2018	Slovenia	OG	4	2	1	3	0
2018	Slovenia	WC D1A	5	3	3	6	0
2020	Slovenia	OGQ	3	3	4	7	2
2021	Slovenia	OGQ	3	1	1	2	4
2022	Slovenia	WC D1A	4	0	7	7	0
2023	Slovenia	WC	7	1	2	3	4
2024	Slovenia	OGQ	3	3	0	3	8
Junior totals			15	6	7	13	0
Senior totals			74	31	35	66	34
