= Matjaž Kopitar =

Slovenian ice hockey player and coach

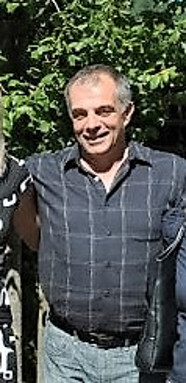
- Born: 6 November 1965 (age 59); Jesenice, SFR Yugoslavia
- Height: 5 ft 11 in (180 cm)
- Weight: 187 lb (85 kg; 13 st 5 lb)
- Played for: HK Acroni Jesenice; HK MK Bled; HK Maribor; EC KAC
- National team: Yugoslavia and Slovenia
- Playing career: 1983–2003

Matjaž Kopitar (born 6 November 1965) is a Slovenian former professional ice hockey player. He is the father of the ice hockey players Gašper and Anže Kopitar.

== Playing career ==
Kopitar began his career with HK Acroni Jesenice in 1983 and played eleven seasons with the club. He played two seasons with HK MK Bled and Klagenfurt AC. He finished his career with HK Maribor in 2003. Kopitar represented Yugoslavia and Slovenia in international competitions.

== Coaching career ==
He coached HK Acroni Jesenice in the 2006-07 season and is the current coach of the Slovenia men's national ice hockey team. He coached the national team at the 2011 World Championships and at the 2012 Div I A World Championship where they won first place.
