= Matjaž Sekelj =

- Born: December 9, 1960 (age 64); Ljubljana, Yugoslavia
- Height: 5 ft 10 in (178 cm)
- Weight: 163 lb (74 kg; 11 st 9 lb)
- Position: Forward
- Played for: HDD Olimpija Ljubljana
- National team: Yugoslavia

Matjaz Sekelj (born December 9, 1960, in Ljubljana, Yugoslavia) is a retired Slovenian professional ice hockey player.

Sekelj participated with HDD Olimpija Ljubljana in the Yugoslav Ice Hockey League for his entire career. He used to play for KHK Crvena Zvezda together with Jože Kovač. He participated with the Yugoslavia national ice hockey team at the 1984 Winter Olympics. He coached HDD Olimpija Ljubljana from 1997 to 2000.
