= Anže Kopitar =

Slovenian ice hockey player (born 1987)

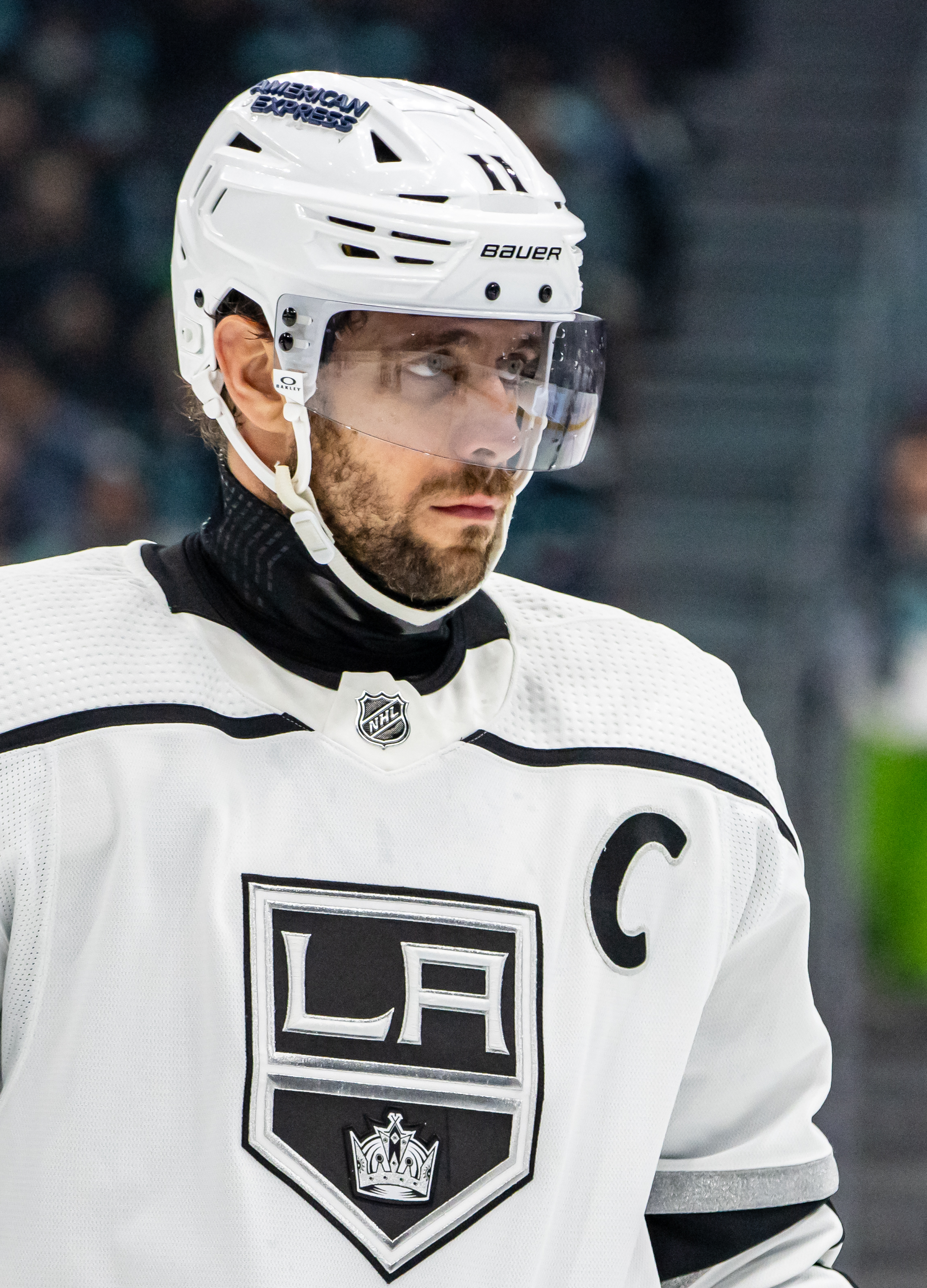
- Kopitar with the Los Angeles Kings in December 2023
- Born: 24 August 1987 (age 39) Jesenice, SR Slovenia, SFR Yugoslavia
- Height: 6 ft 3 in (191 cm)
- Weight: 224 lb (102 kg; 16 st 0 lb)
- Position: Centre
- Shot: Left
- Played for: HK Kranjska Gora; Södertälje SK; Los Angeles Kings
- National team: Slovenia
- NHL draft: 11th overall, 2005; Los Angeles Kings
- Playing career: 2002–2026

Anže Kopitar (pronounced [anˈʒɛ kɔˈpiːtaɾ], born 24 August 1987) is a Slovenian former professional ice hockey player. Kopitar played as a centre and spent his entire 20-season NHL career with the Los Angeles Kings of the National Hockey League (NHL). The 11th overall pick in the 2005 NHL entry draft, Kopitar became the first Slovenian to play in the NHL upon making his debut in 2006. Kopitar led the Kings team in scoring in all but four seasons and is first in franchise history in points, third in goals, and first in assists. He scored his 1,000th career point in 2021. Following the 2015–16 season, he was named the Kings' captain. Noted for both his offensive and defensive play, Kopitar was awarded the Frank J. Selke Trophy as the best defensive forward in the NHL in 2016 and 2018 while also being a finalist in 2014 and 2015, as well as the Lady Byng Memorial Trophy for gentlemanly play in 2016, 2023 and 2025 while also being a finalist in 2015 and 2026. He was also a finalist for the Hart Memorial Trophy in 2018.

Kopitar played junior hockey for his hometown team HK Acroni Jesenice before moving to Sweden at age 16 to play in a more competitive league. He spent one season with the junior teams of the Södertälje SK organization, and then with the senior team of the top-level Elitserien. He moved to North America to join the Kings in 2006, one year after he was drafted, and finished fourth in the Calder Memorial Trophy voting for the league's top rookie. Kopitar's offensive talent was immediately apparent while his defensive style developed in later seasons and he has become recognized for his two-way play. Praised as one of the best players in the NHL, Kopitar won the Stanley Cup with the Kings in 2012 and 2014, leading the playoffs in points on both occasions (tied with teammate Dustin Brown in 2012). Internationally, Kopitar represented the Slovenian national team in several junior and senior tournaments, as well as at the 2014 Winter Olympics in Sochi. He also played for Team Europe at the 2016 World Cup of Hockey.

== Playing career ==
=== European career (2002–2006) ===
In 2002, Kopitar began playing for the youth team of his hometown, HK Acroni Jesenice. He split the year between the team's under-18 and junior clubs, and also appeared in 11 games for the senior team HK Kranjska Gora of the Slovenian Ice Hockey League. Kopitar had four goals and four assists in the senior league, and recorded 76 points in 14 games for the Jesenice under-18 team and 27 points in 20 games for the junior club. He led the Slovenian Ice Hockey League in scoring at the age of 16, and Swedish scout Lars Söder recruited Kopitar for the Elitserien in 2004 (Söder had originally discovered Kopitar when he was 13 at the 2001 European Youth Olympic Winter Festival in Vuokatti, Finland).

The Slovenian Ice Hockey League did not have a high enough skill level, so Kopitar decided that if he wanted to improve his career prospects, he would have to leave the country. He was offered a chance to play in Sweden for Södertälje SK, eventually joining their junior team where he led the League in scoring, with 49 points (28 goals, 21 assists) in 30 games. At 17, prior to the 2005 NHL entry draft, Kopitar was ranked the top European skater by the NHL Central Scouting Bureau. After his first season in Sweden, he was chosen 11th overall by the Los Angeles Kings in the 2005 Draft. Unlike most top-ranked prospects, Kopitar was not at the draft, but in Sweden playing in preseason games. Some members of the team had a party for the draft, including Niclas Bergfors, who was selected 23rd overall by the New Jersey Devils. Prior to the NHL Draft, Kopitar was also selected in the CHL Import Draft by the Regina Pats of the Western Hockey League (WHL). At 18 years of age, he declined to move to North America, however, hoping to further his development by continuing to play against professionals in the Elitserien, rather than against major junior players in the WHL.

=== Los Angeles Kings (2006–2026) ===
Kopitar signed an entry-level contract with the Kings on 7 September 2005, but returned to play in Sweden for another season. The next year, 2006, he accepted an invitation to Los Angeles' rookie camp.

==== Early career and establishment (2006–2010) ====
Kopitar made his NHL debut on 6 October 2006, against the Anaheim Ducks, scoring two goals in the game. In January 2007, he was named to the NHL YoungStars Game, an event included at the All-Star Game festivities; Kopitar recorded two goals and three assists. Kopitar completed his first NHL season third among rookies in scoring, behind Evgeni Malkin and Paul Šťastný, with 20 goals and 41 assists for 61 points. It marked the fifth-highest point total by a Kings rookie, and the highest since Luc Robitaille in 1986–87. He finished fourth in voting for the Calder Memorial Trophy as rookie of the year. Kopitar was awarded the Mark Bavis Memorial Award as the best first-year member of the Kings and was also named the Kings' Most Popular Player.

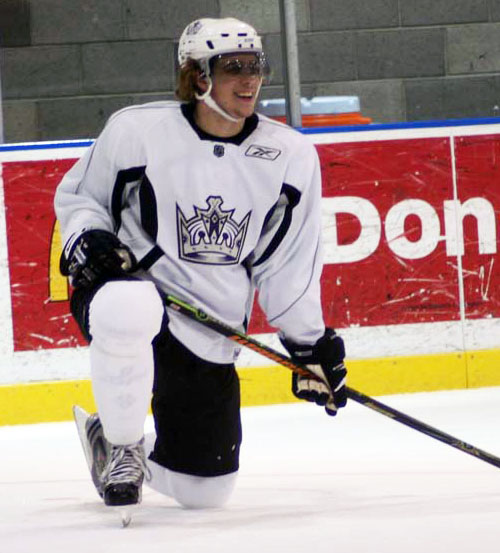
Kopitar practicing with the Kings in April 2007. He made his NHL debut in the 2006–07 season.

The following season, Kopitar was selected to represent the Western Conference at the 2008 NHL All-Star Game in Atlanta, his first All-Star game appearance. He was the youngest player in the game, nearly two years younger than the second-youngest player, Paul Stastny (Sidney Crosby was younger, but had to withdraw prior to the game due to injury). Kopitar finished the regular season with 32 goals and 45 assists for 77 points; he led the Kings in assists and points and was second in goals. Kopitar won the Bill Libby Memorial Award as the most valuable player on the Kings.

Early in the 2008–09 season, on 11 October 2008, Kopitar signed a seven-year contract extension with the Kings worth $47.6 million. The contract would keep Kopitar with the team until the conclusion of the 2015–16 season. He finished the season with 27 goals and 39 assists for 66 points in all 82 games, leading the Kings in both assists and points, while again finishing second in goals scored.

The following season, Kopitar scored his first career NHL hat-trick (three goals in one game) on 22 October 2009 against the Dallas Stars. He finished the 2009–10 season with a career-high 34 goals, 47 assists and 81 points in all 82 contests played. For the second time in his career, Kopitar won the Bill Libby Memorial Award as the Kings' most valuable player, and led the team in scoring for the third-straight year. as the Kings qualified for the postseason for the first time since 2002 having finished the season as the sixth seed in the West. Kopitar made his Stanley Cup playoff debut on 15 April 2010, in the first game of the opening round against the third-seeded Vancouver Canucks where the Kings lost the game 3–2 and recorded his first career playoff assist and point on a goal by Jarret Stoll. Two days later in game two of the series, Kopitar recorded his first career playoff goal against Canucks' goaltender Roberto Luongo as the Kings would go on to win the game 3–2 to even the series at 1–1. The Kings would go on to lose in the Western Conference quarterfinals in six games to the Canucks and Kopitar finished tied for third on the team with five points in six games.

==== Stanley Cup championships (2010–2015) ====
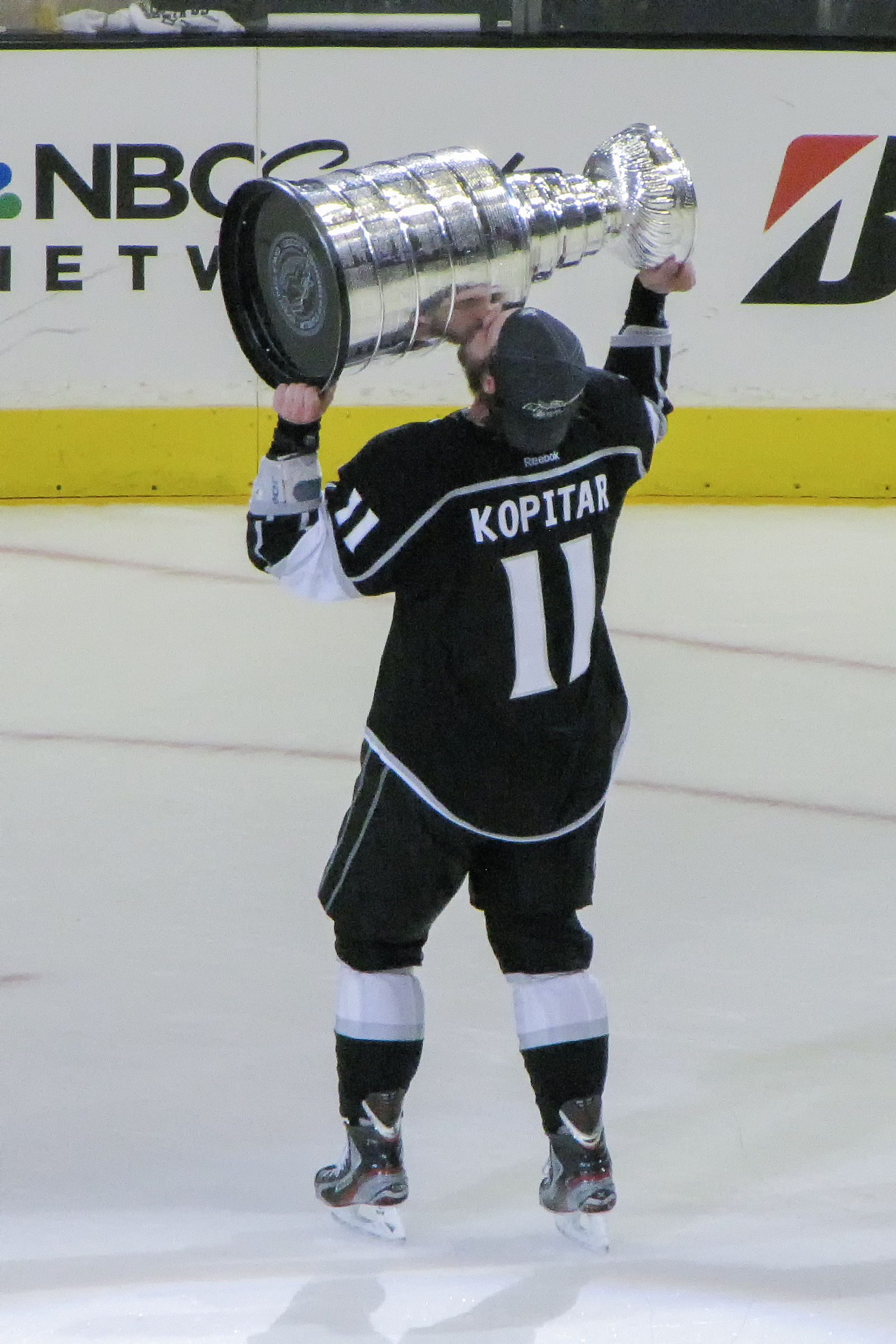
Kopitar celebrates with the Stanley Cup in June 2012, after the Kings won the 2012 Stanley Cup Final.

The 2010–11 season saw Kopitar play in his 325th consecutive NHL game, which set a new Kings team record, passing Marcel Dionne on 15 March 2011. However eleven days later, on 26 March, Kopitar's season and ironman streak came to an abrupt end at 330 games after he suffered a broken ankle in a 4–1 win game against the Colorado Avalanche as a result from a collision with Avalanche defenceman Ryan O'Byrne. Despite the late-season injury setback and missing the final seven regular season games and the playoffs, Kopitar led the team in scoring for the fourth straight season with 73 points (25 goals, 48 assists), and was named the team's most valuable player for the second time while the Kings as a team finished the season as the seventh seed in the Western Conference. In Kopitar's absence, the Kings would go on to lose in the opening round of the 2011 playoffs in six games to the second-seeded San Jose Sharks.

In the 2011–12 season, Kopitar led the Kings in scoring with 76 points, (25 goals and a career-best 51 assists) in all 82 games played. After defeating the back-to-back Presidents' Trophy-winning Vancouver Canucks in five games in the conference quarterfinals along with a conference semifinals sweep to the second-seeded St. Louis Blues and a five-game victory over the third-seeded Phoenix Coyotes in the conference finals of the 2012 playoffs, the Kings won the Stanley Cup as the playoff champions, by defeating the sixth-seeded New Jersey Devils in six games in the Stanley Cup Final for their first title in team history. Kopitar finished tied with Kings captain Dustin Brown to lead the team in playoff scoring, with each having 20 points (eight goals, 12 assists) from all 20 games played. Kopitar became the first Slovenian-born player to win the Stanley Cup. In recognition of this, Kopitar was named as the 2012 Slovenian male Athlete of the Year.

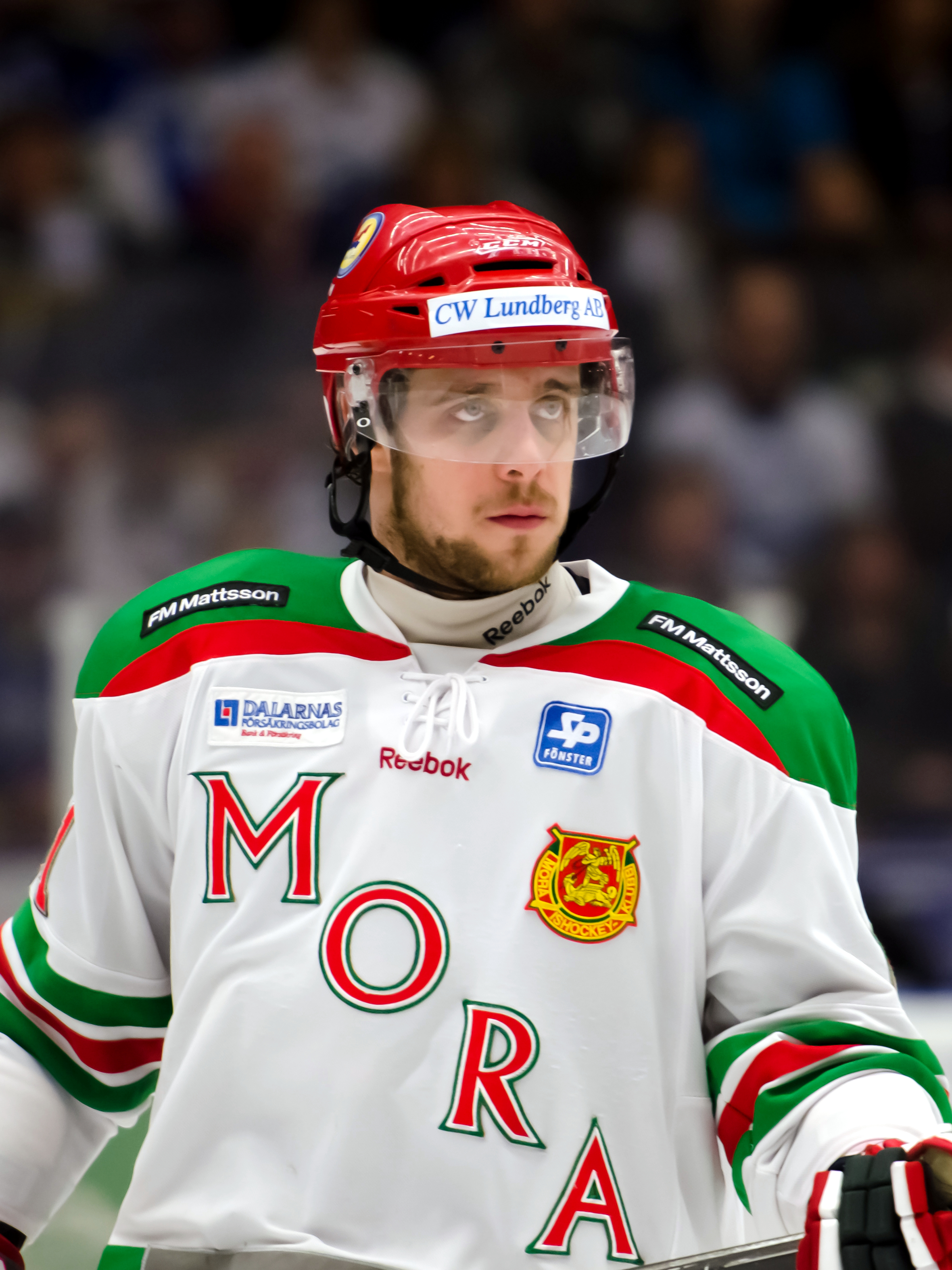
Kopitar in December 2012. He played with Allsvenskan's Mora IK during the 2012–13 NHL lockout.

The 2012–13 NHL season was delayed due to the NHL lockout, so Kopitar joined his younger brother Gašper on Mora IK of the Swedish second-tier league HockeyAllsvenskan, signing a contract with the team for the 2012–13 season. He played 31 games for Mora, scoring 34 points, before the NHL lockout ended in January 2013. A shortened, 48-game NHL season commenced, Kopitar recorded 10 goals, and 32 assists for 42 points in 47 games to once again lead the Kings in scoring, and was named the team's best defensive player. Kopitar and the Kings would go on another lengthy playoff run as the defending champions but unable to defend their title as they lost in five games to the Presidents' Trophy-winning and eventual Stanley Cup champion Chicago Blackhawks. Kopitar finished the 2013 playoffs by playing in all 18 games with three goals and six assists for nine points recorded.

The 2013–14 season saw the Kings as a team finish the season as the sixth seed in the West and Kopitar play all 82 games and individually lead the team in scoring for the seventh consecutive season, with 70 points (29 goals, 41 assists), and was named both the team's most valuable player and best defensive player. He also was a finalist for the Frank J. Selke Trophy as best defensive forward in the NHL for the first time, which was eventually awarded to Patrice Bergeron of the Boston Bruins. In the 2014 playoffs, Kopitar led the entire league in scoring, recording five goals and 21 assists for 26 points in all 26 games, as the Kings won their second Stanley Cup championship in three seasons and second in franchise history altogether after they defeated the third-seeded San Jose Sharks in seven games in the first round (after initially trailing 3–0 earlier in the series), the top-seeded Anaheim Ducks in the second round in seven games (after initially trailing 3–2 earlier in the series) and the defending Stanley Cup champion and fifth-seeded Chicago Blackhawks in the third round in seven games prior to defeating the fifth seed New York Rangers in five games in the Stanley Cup Final. Kopitar's productivity throughout the 2014 playoffs led to him being a potential candidate for the Conn Smythe Trophy as the playoff MVP (although the award eventually went to teammate Justin Williams).

Despite the defending Stanley Cup champion Kings not qualifying for the 2015 playoffs, The 2014–15 campaign saw Kopitar continue his individual dominance and tie Marcel Dionne as he became the only player in Kings history to lead the team in scoring eight times, having scored 16 goals and 48 assists for 64 points in 79 games. Kopitar was a finalist for the Selke Trophy again (although it was eventually given to Patrice Bergeron again), and also for the Lady Byng Memorial Trophy, awarded for sportsmanship (which was eventually awarded Jiri Hudler of the Calgary Flames.

==== Selke Trophy wins, start of captaincy (2015–2021) ====
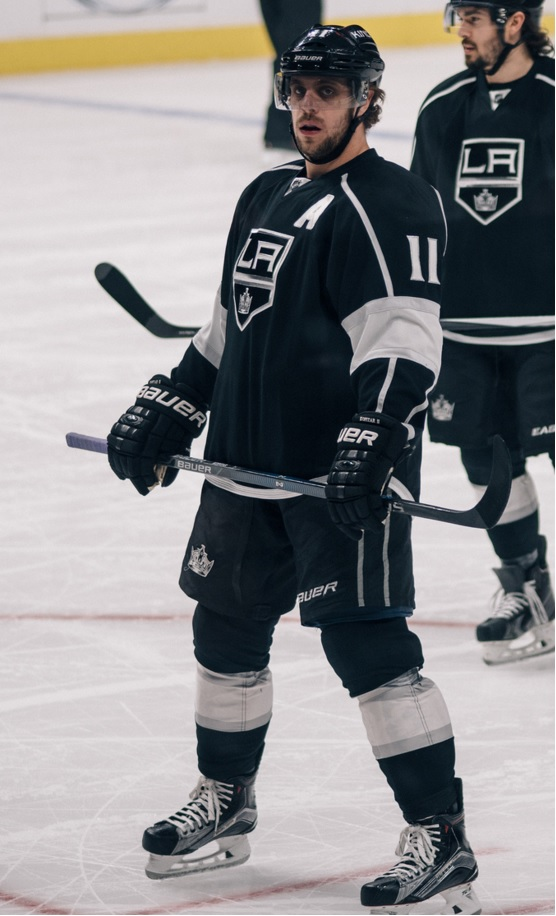
Kopitar with the Kings in November 2015

During the 2015–16 season Kopitar signed an eight-year contract extension with the Kings. It would pay him an average of $10 million per season until the end of the 2023–24 season. He finished the season with 25 goals, 49 assists and 74 points, setting a team record by leading the Kings in scoring for a ninth consecutive season and the Kings would get back into the playoffs where they would lose in five games in the first round to the San Jose Sharks. Kopitar also was awarded both the Lady Byng Trophy and Frank J. Selke Trophy, the first player from the Kings to win either award. He also won the Bill Libby Memorial Award as the most valuable player on the Kings for the fifth time.

On 16 June 2016, Kopitar was named the captain of the Kings, replacing Dustin Brown. In his first season as captain of the Kings, Kopitar saw his production drop, and he finished with 12 goals, 40 assists and 52 points in 76 contests, second on the team behind Jeff Carter's 66 points, and ending his nine-year streak of leading the team in scoring.

Kopitar returned to form in the 2017–18 season scoring a career-high 35 goals and 57 assists for 92 points in all 82 games played, helping the Kings get back to the playoffs. He scored his fourth career hat-trick with four goals on 22 March 2018, against the Colorado Avalanche. After the season, Kopitar was a finalist for the Hart Memorial Trophy (as the regular season MVP) for the first time (which was awarded to New Jersey Devils forward Taylor Hall) and was awarded the Frank J. Selke Trophy for the second time in his career. Kopitar and the Kings would return to the playoffs after missing the year prior. In the 2018 playoffs, Kopitar recorded a goal and an assist as the Kings would be swept in the opening round to the Vegas Golden Knights.

On 5 January 2019, Kopitar recorded his 300th NHL goal in a 4–0 win against the Edmonton Oilers on Oilers' goaltender Cam Talbot. Towards the end of the 2018–19 season, on 1 April, in a 7–2 loss against the Calgary Flames, Kopitar played his 1,000th NHL game.

On 5 May 2021, towards the end of the pandemic-shortened 2020–21 season, Kopitar recorded his 1,000th career point against the Arizona Coyotes on a Sean Walker goal, becoming the 91st player to reach the mark.

==== Later years (2021–2026) ====
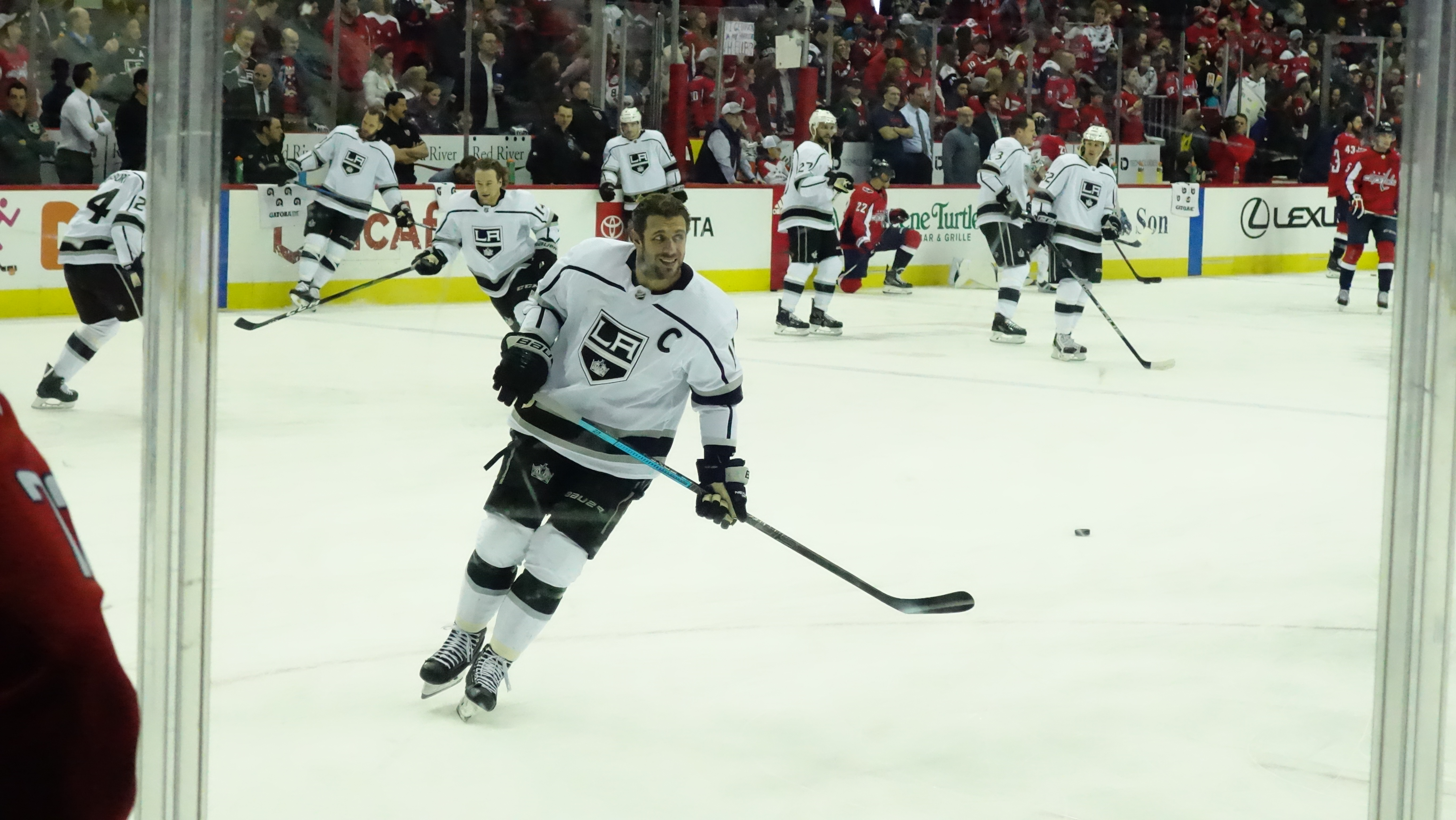
Kopitar warming up in February 2019

On 14 October 2021, Kopitar scored three goals and two assists against the Vegas Golden Knights, setting a franchise record for most points in a home opening game since Jari Kurri did it back in 1991–92. However, Kopitar missed the 20-goal mark for the first time since the 2016–17 season (excluding the shortened 2020–21 season). He recorded his 700th career assist on a goal by Adrian Kempe in the Kings' final home game of the season on 23 April 2022, a 4–2 win against the Anaheim Ducks. Kopitar finished the 2021–22 season playing in 81 games with 67 points (19 goals, 48 assists) recorded as the Kings qualified for the playoffs for the first time since 2018 where the Kings lost in the first round in seven games to the Edmonton Oilers, surrendering a 3–2 series lead along the way. He was eventually awarded the Mark Messier Leadership Award, becoming the second Kings player to win it after teammate Dustin Brown in 2014.

On 9 January 2023, Kopitar recorded his 1,100th NHL point in a 6–3 win over the Edmonton Oilers with an assist on a Kevin Fiala goal, becoming the third player in Kings history to reach the mark. Kopitar recorded his sixth career hat-trick on 28 February, scoring four goals in a 6–5 shootout victory against the Winnipeg Jets. At the season's end, he would win his second Lady Byng Memorial Trophy, becoming the first Kings player since Wayne Gretzky to win the award more than once.

The Kings re-signed Kopitar to a two-year contract extension on 6 July 2023. On 21 October, in a 4–2 loss to the Boston Bruins, Kopitar passed Dustin Brown as leader of games played in the Kings franchise history. Having an impressive start in the 2023–24 season, on 8 November, he scored his 400th NHL goal, which was also the game-winning goal, against the Vegas Golden Knights. On 3 December, Kopitar passed Marcel Dionne to become the all-time assists leader in Kings franchise history. On 20 March 2024, Kopitar recorded his 1,200th NHL point with an assist on a goal scored by Kevin Fiala in a 6–0 win over the Minnesota Wild. He finished the 2023–24 season with 26 goals and 44 assists for 70 points in 81 games along with one goal, two assists and three points in all five games in the 2024 playoffs as the Kings were defeated by the Edmonton Oilers in the opening round for a third consecutive year, this time in five games.

On 30 October 2024, Kopitar recorded his 800th career assist on a goal by Kevin Fiala in a 6–3 win over the Vegas Golden Knights, becoming the 35th player in league history to hit the mark. The 2024–25 season saw him record 21 goals and 46 assists for 67 points in 81 games, while taking only two minor penalties. As the Kings lost in the opening round of the 2025 playoffs to the Edmonton Oilers once more, this time in six games, he recorded two goals and seven assists for nine points in all six games. Kopitar was named a finalist for the Lady Byng Memorial Trophy for the fourth time. On 12 June 2025, Kopitar was announced as the winner of the Lady Byng Trophy, his third time earning the award.

On 18 September 2025, Kopitar announced that he would retire after the 2025–26 season. During that season, Kopitar became the 25th player in NHL history to play 1,500 regular season games. On 14 March 2026, Kopitar scored twice to get points 1307 and 1308, tying and breaking Marcel Dionne's record for the most career points in franchise history. Kopitar ended the season with 12 goals and 26 assists for 38 points in 67 games played as the Kings narrowly made the playoffs as the eight seed in the Western Conference. Having only taken five minor penalties all season, he was for the fifth time named a Lady Byng Memorial Trophy finalist, which was given to Montreal Canadiens forward Cole Caufield. The Kings were swept in the first round of the 2026 playoffs by the Presidents' Trophy-winning Colorado Avalanche. Kopitar played all four games and was held scoreless. He played his final game on 26 April, in front of the home crowd in Los Angeles. During the final minutes of the game, the crowd chanted "Thank you, Kopi!" and gave him a standing ovation after the final whistle. On February 24, 2027, Kopitar will have his jersey retired as well as a bronze statue of him unveiled outside Crypto.com Arena.

== International play ==
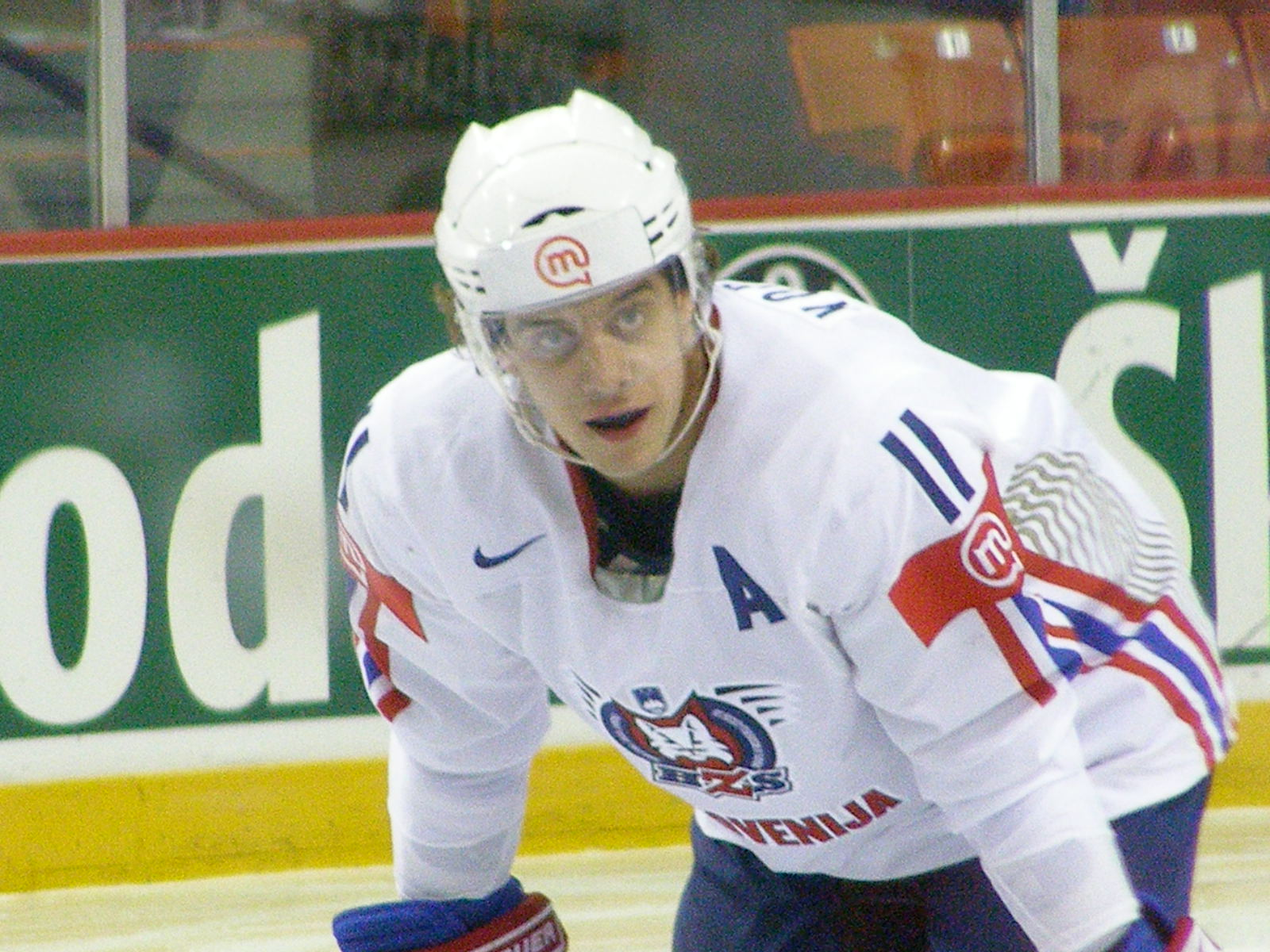
Kopitar with the Slovenian national team at the 2008 World Championship

Kopitar first played in an international tournament when he participated in the Division I (second level) tournament of the 2003 World U18 Championships for the Slovenian national junior team. He appeared in five games and recorded three points. The following year he appeared in the 2004 World U18 Championships and the 2004 World Junior Championships. Slovenia competed in Division I at both tournaments, one level below the top division. Kopitar scored six goals and eight points in five games during the under-18 tournament and finished second overall for goals scored and third for points, leading Slovenia in both categories; at the World Juniors he had one goal and one assist in five games.

In 2005, Kopitar appeared in three international tournaments for Slovenia; he took part in the World U18 Championship, World Juniors, and the senior World Championship, his first tournament with the Slovenian national team. Slovenia competed at the Division I level for both junior tournaments, but at the top level for the senior championship. He would play his last junior tournament in 2006 at the Division I level, with six points in five games. At the 2006 World Championship he played for Slovenia at the top level and recorded three goals and nine points in six games, tying for fifth among scoring leaders. Slovenia was relegated to Division I for 2007, where Kopitar had 13 assists and 14 points, leading the tournament in both categories. Back in the top division for the 2008 World Championship, Kopitar appeared in five games and had four points to lead his team, though Slovenia was once again relegated.

Slovenia qualified for the 2014 Winter Olympics in Sochi; as the qualifying games were held during the NHL season Kopitar was unable to participate, though his father Matjaž coached the team and Gašper played in the matches. Though Gašper was part of the team that secured qualification for Slovenia, he was not named to the Olympic roster. Kopitar helped Slovenia reach the quarterfinals of the tournament by scoring two goals and one assist.

Kopitar was also named to play in the 2016 World Cup of Hockey for Team Europe, which includes players from most of Europe (the Czech Republic, Finland, Russia, and Sweden have their own teams). Prior to the announcement Kopitar had expressed excitement towards the concept, which was to be introduced during the tournament, noting that as a Slovenian he had few opportunities to play in tournaments like this.

== Playing style ==
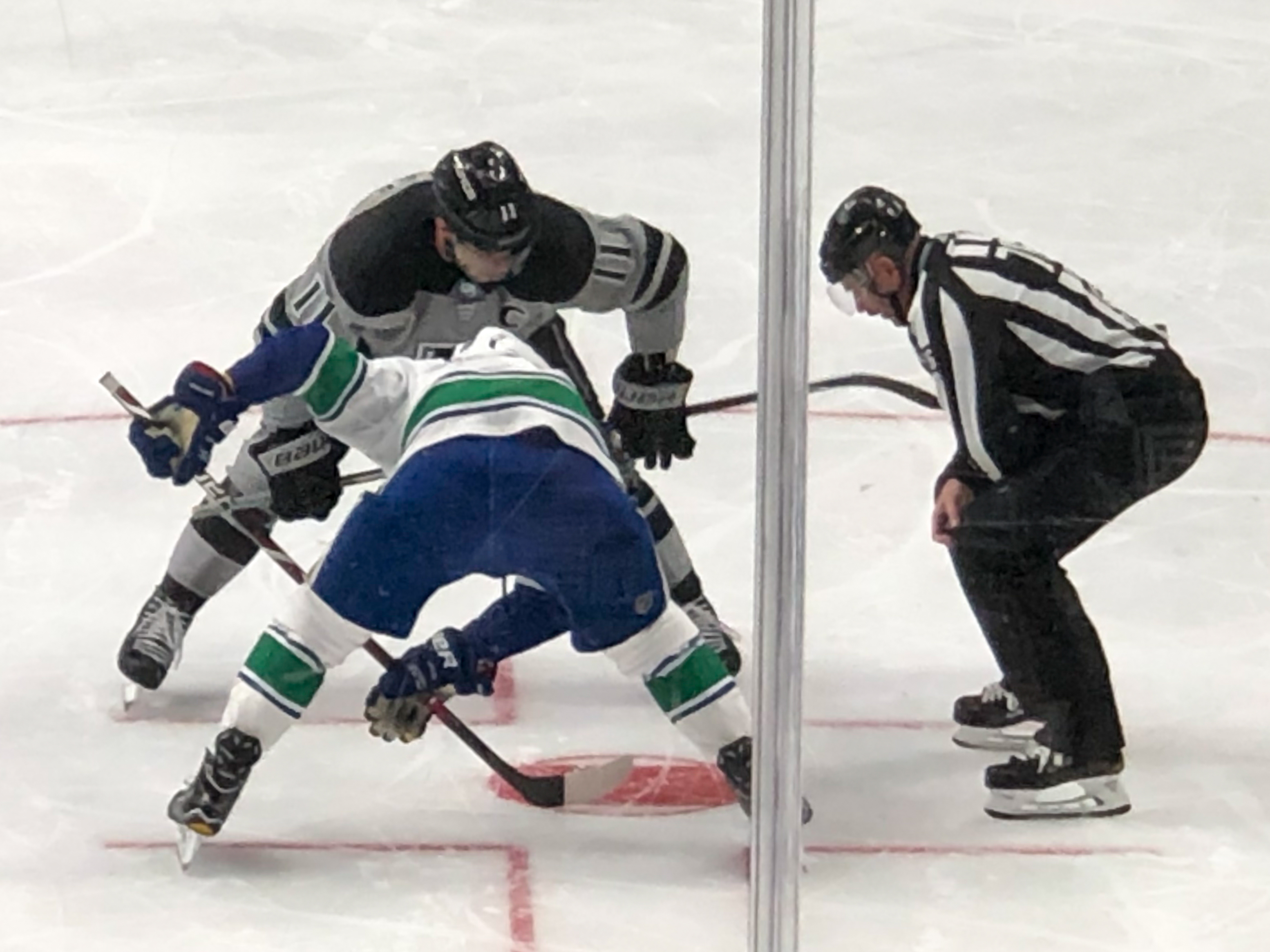
Kopitar (back) prepares to take a face-off against Adam Gaudette in November 2018. Kopitar holds one of the highest career averages for face-off wins in the NHL.

Kopitar was known in the NHL as one of the most effective two-way forwards, excelling in both offense and defense, for which he won the Frank J. Selke Trophy in 2016 and 2018, after being a finalist for the award in both 2014 and 2015. In addition to his defensive play, Kopitar has one of the highest career averages for winning faceoffs, and led the Kings in team scoring 14 times in his career.

"He combines size, strength and intelligence, he's as difficult to play against as any player in the league. He's very responsible defensively and checks very well, especially with his stick. He's one of the best in the league at anticipating where the puck is going and jumping in to cut off cycles."

— San Jose Sharks forward Logan Couture on Kopitar, January 2015

== Personal life ==
Kopitar was born in Jesenice, SR Slovenia, SFR Yugoslavia, to Matjaž and Mateja Kopitar. Matjaž played ice hockey for HK Acroni Jesenice, winning the league title three times, and was a member of the Yugoslav and Slovenian national teams. He also coached HK Acroni Jesenice of the Austrian Hockey League during the 2006–07 season and the Slovenian national team from 2010 until 2015. Mateja worked at the family restaurant in Hrušica, a village about five kilometres from Jesenice.

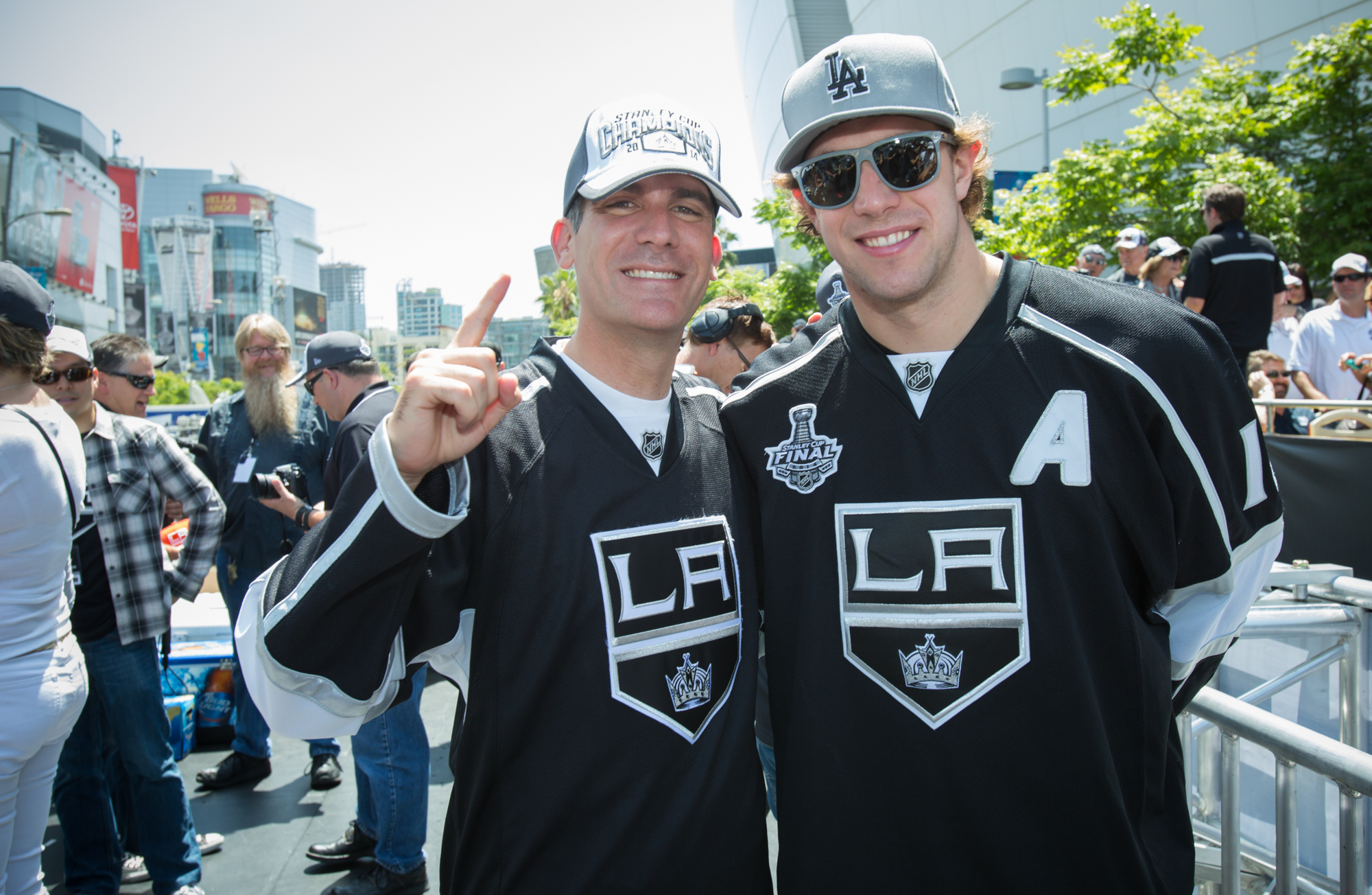
Kopitar in June 2014 with Los Angeles mayor Eric Garcetti during the 2014 Stanley Cup championship parade

When Kopitar was four, his father first taught him how to skate; Matjaž built an ice rink in their backyard in Hrušica, and Kopitar would play there whenever he could. Kopitar has a brother, Gašper, who is five years younger and also plays ice hockey. When the Kopitar family moved to Los Angeles, Gašper joined a junior team sponsored by the Kings. He then played for the Portland Winterhawks of the major junior Western Hockey League (WHL) and the Des Moines Buccaneers of the United States Hockey League (USHL), before turning professional with Mora IK in Sweden. Kopitar's grandmother taught English at a local high school, and both Kopitar and his brother learned to speak English from her. Kopitar speaks five languages: Slovenian, Serbian, German, Swedish, and English. He enjoys playing soccer and is a declared supporter of Slovenian soccer club NK Maribor.

Kopitar is renowned in Slovenia due to his hockey exploits, with a government-sponsored website declaring that after he won the Stanley Cup in 2012 he was "the most recognised Slovenian sportsman." As a youth, he played in the 2000 and 2001 Quebec International Pee-Wee Hockey Tournaments with a team from Slovenia. He also hosts an annual charity golf tournament that benefits various groups, mainly youths.

Kopitar lived with his parents until moving to Sweden, where he lived alone in an apartment. After his first season in the NHL, the rest of Kopitar's family joined him in Los Angeles; Kopitar bought a home in Manhattan Beach in 2014. Kopitar met Ines Dominc in Slovenia in 2005; they married in July 2013. Their first child, a daughter named Neža, was born on 14 March 2015. Their second child, son Jakob, was born 5 October 2016.

== Career statistics ==
=== Regular season and playoffs ===
Bold indicates led league

			Regular season					Playoffs
Season	Team	League	GP	G	A	Pts	PIM	GP	G	A	Pts	PIM
2002–03	HD Hidria Jesenice	SVN U18	14	38	38	76	10	—	—	—	—	—
2002–03	HD Hidria Jesenice	SVN U20	16	12	10	22	4	4	3	2	5	4
2002–03	HK Kranjska Gora	SVN	11	4	4	8	4	—	—	—	—	—
2003–04	HD Hidria Jesenice	SVN U20	20	30	24	54	16	5	2	4	6	0
2003–04	HK Kranjska Gora	SVN	21	14	11	25	10	4	1	1	2	0
2004–05	Södertälje SK	SWE U18	1	1	2	3	0	1	0	0	0	2
2004–05	Södertälje SK	J20	30	28	21	49	26	2	1	1	2	0
2004–05	Södertälje SK	SEL	5	0	0	0	0	10	0	0	0	0
2005–06	Södertälje SK	SEL	47	8	12	20	28	—	—	—	—	—
2006–07	Los Angeles Kings	NHL	72	20	41	61	24	—	—	—	—	—
2007–08	Los Angeles Kings	NHL	82	32	45	77	22	—	—	—	—	—
2008–09	Los Angeles Kings	NHL	82	27	39	66	32	—	—	—	—	—
2009–10	Los Angeles Kings	NHL	82	34	47	81	16	6	2	3	5	2
2010–11	Los Angeles Kings	NHL	75	25	48	73	20	—	—	—	—	—
2011–12	Los Angeles Kings	NHL	82	25	51	76	20	20	**8**	**12**	**20**	9
2012–13	Mora IK	Allsv	31	10	24	34	14	—	—	—	—	—
2012–13	Los Angeles Kings	NHL	47	10	32	42	16	18	3	6	9	12
2013–14	Los Angeles Kings	NHL	82	29	41	70	24	26	5	**21**	**26**	14
2014–15	Los Angeles Kings	NHL	79	16	48	64	10	—	—	—	—	—
2015–16	Los Angeles Kings	NHL	81	25	49	74	16	5	2	2	4	2
2016–17	Los Angeles Kings	NHL	76	12	40	52	28	—	—	—	—	—
2017–18	Los Angeles Kings	NHL	82	35	57	92	20	4	1	1	2	0
2018–19	Los Angeles Kings	NHL	81	22	38	60	30	—	—	—	—	—
2019–20	Los Angeles Kings	NHL	70	21	41	62	16	—	—	—	—	—
2020–21	Los Angeles Kings	NHL	56	13	37	50	10	—	—	—	—	—
2021–22	Los Angeles Kings	NHL	81	19	48	67	14	7	1	3	4	2
2022–23	Los Angeles Kings	NHL	82	28	46	74	4	6	2	5	7	0
2023–24	Los Angeles Kings	NHL	81	26	44	70	22	5	1	2	3	4
2024–25	Los Angeles Kings	NHL	81	21	46	67	4	6	2	7	9	0
2025–26	Los Angeles Kings	NHL	67	12	26	38	10	4	0	0	0	0
SVN totals			32	18	15	33	14	4	1	1	2	0
SEL totals			52	8	12	20	28	10	0	0	0	0
NHL totals			1,521	452	864	1,316	358	107	27	62	89	45

=== International ===
Year	Team	Event	GP	G	A	Pts	PIM
2003	Slovenia	WJC18 (Div I)	5	2	1	3	0
2004	Slovenia	WJC (Div I)	5	1	1	2	0
2004	Slovenia	WJC18 (Div I)	5	6	2	8	0
2005	Slovenia	WJC (Div I)	5	10	3	13	6
2005	Slovenia	WJC18 (Div I)	5	6	5	11	14
2005	Slovenia	OGQ	3	1	1	2	2
2005	Slovenia	WC	6	1	0	1	2
2006	Slovenia	WJC (Div I)	5	5	1	6	4
2006	Slovenia	WC	6	3	6	9	2
2007	Slovenia	WC (Div I)	5	1	13	14	2
2008	Slovenia	WC	5	3	1	4	2
2014	Slovenia	OG	5	2	1	3	4
2015	Slovenia	WC	7	1	3	4	0
2016	Team Europe	WCH	6	0	4	4	2
2019	Slovenia	WC (Div IA)	5	2	5	7	2
2021	Slovenia	OGQ	3	1	6	7	2
Junior totals			30	30	13	43	24
Senior totals			51	15	40	55	20

=== YoungStar Games ===
Year	Location	G	A	Pts
2007	Dallas	2	3	5
Totals		2	3	5

=== All-Star Games ===
Year	Location	G	A	Pts
2008	Atlanta	0	0	0
2011	Carolina	2	0	2
2015	Columbus	0	0	0
2018	Tampa Bay	0	2	2
2020	St. Louis	0	4	4
Totals		2	6	8

- All statistics are taken from NHL.com.

== Awards and honours ==
Award	Year
NHL
NHL YoungStars Game	2007
NHL All-Star Game	2008, 2011, 2015, 2018, 2020
Stanley Cup champion	2012, 2014
Frank J. Selke Trophy	2016, 2018
Lady Byng Memorial Trophy	2016, 2023, 2025
Mark Messier Leadership Award	2022
Los Angeles Kings
Most Popular Player	2007, 2011, 2021
Mark Bavis Memorial Award	2007
Ace Bailey Memorial Award	2020, 2021, 2025, 2026
Bill Libby Memorial Award	2008, 2010, 2011, 2014, 2016, 2023
Leading Scorer Award	2008, 2009, 2010, 2011, 2012, 2013, 2014, 2015, 2016, 2018, 2019, 2020, 2021, 2022, 2023
Best Defensive Player	2011, 2013, 2014, 2015, 2023, 2024, 2026
Slovenian Ice Hockey League
Points leader	2004

== Records ==
=== NHL ===
- First Slovenian player in league history

==== Los Angeles Kings ====
- First player to win the Frank J. Selke Trophy
- Most career seasons played (20)
- Most career games played (1,521)
- Most career points (1,316)
- Most career assists (864)
- Most game-winning goals (79)
- Most career overtime points (34)
- Most career overtime assists (25)
- Most career shootout goals (43)
- Most career shootout deciding goals (17)
- Most career shootout shot attempts (123)
- Longest tenured captain (10 seasons, from 2016–17 to 2025–26)
- Most goals in a period (3, tied with 16 others)
- Most goals in a game (4, tied with 15 others)
- Most goals in a road game (4, tied with 6 others)
- Most overtime goals in a season (4, in 2025–26, tied with 2 others)
- Most shootout deciding goals in a season (5, in 2013–14)
- Most assists in a game by a rookie (3, tied with 16 others)

Sporting positions
Preceded by Dustin Brown	Los Angeles Kings captain 2016–2026	Succeeded by Drew Doughty
Awards and achievements
Preceded by Lauri Tukonen	Los Angeles Kings first-round draft pick 2005	Succeeded by Jonathan Bernier
Preceded by Patrice Bergeron; Patrice Bergeron	Frank J. Selke Trophy winner 2016; 2018	Succeeded by Patrice Bergeron; Ryan O'Reilly
Preceded by Jiří Hudler; Kyle Connor; Jaccob Slavin	Lady Byng Memorial Trophy winner 2016; 2023; 2025	Succeeded by Johnny Gaudreau; Jaccob Slavin; Cole Caufield
