= 2014–15 KHL Medveščak Zagreb season =

2014–15 KHL Medveščak Zagreb
- Division: 6th Bobrov
- Conference: 13th Western
- 2014–15 record: 17-6-5-32
- Home record: 10-2-4-15
- Road record: 7-4-1-17
- Goals for: 147
- Goals against: 191

Team information
- President: (Croatia) Damir Gojanović
- General manager: (Croatia) Markoantonio Belinic (United States) Aaron Fox (Sports M.) (Croatia) Dragutin Ljubic (Team)
- Coach: (Canada) Doug Shedden (Canada) Dean Fedorchuk (Asst.) (Croatia) Alan Letang (Asst.) (Croatia) Ivo Ratej (Asst.)
- Captain: (Canada) Andrew Murray C (Canada) Mark Popovic A
- Arena: Dom sportova (6.500); Arena Zagreb (15.200)

Team leaders
- Goals: (United States) Bill Thomas (18)
- Assists: (Canada) Martin St. Pierre & (Canada) Pascal Pelletier (23)
- Points: (Canada) Pascal Pelletier (39)
- Penalty minutes: (Croatia) Nathan Perkovich & (Canada) Shaone Morrisonn (78)
- Plus/minus: (+) (Canada) Geoff Kinrade (+11) (−) (Croatia) Saša Martinović (−19)
- Wins: (Canada) Barry Brust & (United States) Cal Heeter (9)
- Goals against average: (Canada) Barry Brust (2.15)

The 2014–15 KHL Medveščak Zagreb season was the second season for the Zagreb-based club in the Kontinental Hockey League. Initially Mark French was announced as head coach of the team, but prior to the season starting he accepted an offer from the Calgary Hitmen, a major junior team in the Canadian-based Western Hockey League. He was replaced by Chuck Weber, who in turn was relieved of his duties due to poor play by the team and succeeded by Doug Shedden. During the season Medveščak participated in the Spengler Cup, the first time the club was invited to play in the tournament.

== Schedule and results ==
=== Regular season ===
2014–15 Game Log
September: 3–0–0–8 (Home: 2–0–0–4; Road: 1–0–0–4) Pts. 9

#	Date	Home team	Score	Away team	Arena	Attendance	Record	Recap
1	4	Slovan Bratislava (Slovakia)	5 - 2	Medveščak Zagreb	Slovnaft Arena	10,055	0-0-0-1	
2	6	Avtomobilist Yekaterinburg	3 - 2	Medveščak Zagreb	KRK Uralets	3,550	0-0-0-2	
3	8	Ak Bars Kazan	4 - 2	Medveščak Zagreb	TatNeft Arena	5,647	0-0-0-3	
4	10	Metallurg Magnitogorsk	6 - 0	Medveščak Zagreb	Magnitogorsk Arena	6,145	0-0-0-4	
5	14	Medveščak Zagreb	5 - 2	Severstal Cherepovets	Dom sportova	6,250	1-0-0-4	
6	16	Medveščak Zagreb	1 - 4	Torpedo Nizhny Novgorod	Dom sportova	5,000	1-0-0-5	
7	18	Medveščak Zagreb	2 - 3	CSKA Moscow	Dom sportova	5,800	1-0-0-6	
8	21	Medveščak Zagreb	5 - 1	Lada Togliatti	Dom sportova	5,800	2-0-0-6	
9	24	Slovan Bratislava (Slovakia)	1 - 4	Medveščak Zagreb	Slovnaft Arena	7,985	3-0-0-6	
10	26	Medveščak Zagreb	1 - 3	Slovan Bratislava (Slovakia)	Dom sportova	5,800	3-0-0-7	
11	29	Medveščak Zagreb	1 - 5	SKA Saint Petersburg	Dom sportova	5,800	3-0-0-8	

October: 5-1-2-6 (Home: 3-0-1-2; Road: 2-1-1-4) Pts. 19

#	Date	Home team	Score	Away team	Arena	Attendance	Record	Recap
12	1	Medveščak Zagreb	0 - 5	SKA Saint Petersburg	Dom Sportova	5,000	3-0-0-9	
13	3	Medveščak Zagreb	3 - 2	Dinamo Riga (Latvia)	Dom sportova	5,000	4-0-0-9	
14	6	Jokerit (Finland)	2 - 3	Medveščak Zagreb	Hartwall Areena	9,351	5-0-0-9	
15	8	SKA Saint Petersburg	5 - 2	Medveščak Zagreb	Ice Palace	12,247	5-0-0-10	
16	10	Dinamo Riga (Latvia)	4 - 3	Medveščak Zagreb	Arena Riga	5,480	6-0-0-10	
17	12	Atlant Mytishchi	5 - 2	Medveščak Zagreb	Mytishchi Arena	6,300	6-0-0-11	
18	14	Medveščak Zagreb	1 - 0	Slovan Bratislava (Slovakia)	Dom Sportova	5,500	7-0-0-11	
19	18	HC Ugra	1 - 2 OT	Medveščak Zagreb	Arena Ugra	3,100	7-1-0-11	
20	20	Traktor Chelyabinsk	2 - 4	Medveščak Zagreb	Traktor Sport Palace	5,800	8-1-0-11	
21	22	Lada Togliatti	2 - 1	Medveščak Zagreb	Lada Arena	5,420	8-1-0-12	
22	24	Neftekhimik Nizhnekamsk	4 - 3 SO	Medveščak Zagreb	SCC Arena	3,500	8-1-1-12	
23	28	Medveščak Zagreb	2 - 0	Sibir Novosibirsk	Dom Sportova	5,000	9-1-1-12	
24	29	Medveščak Zagreb	2 - 1 SO	Metallurg Novokuznetsk	Dom Sportova	5,000	9-2-1-12	
25	31	Medveščak Zagreb	3 - 4	Admiral Vladivostok	Dom Sportova	5.650	9-2-1-13	

November: 3-1-1-6 (Home: 2-0-1-4; Road: 1-1-0-2) Pts. 12

#	Date	Home team	Score	Away team	Arena	Attendance	Record	Recap
26	2	Medveščak	2 - 5	Amur	Dom Sportova	6,100	9-2-1-14	
27	5	Barys Astana (Kazakhstan)	4 - 1	Medveščak	Kazakhstan Sports Palace	4,012	9-2-1-15	
28	7	Metallurg Novokuznetsk	2 - 3	Medveščak	Kuznetsk Palace	3,275	10-2-1-15	
29	12	Slovan (Slovakia)	1 - 2 SO	Medveščak	Slovnaft Arena	8,728	10-3-1-15	
30	14	Medveščak	4 - 1	Atlant	Dom Sportova	5,000	11-3-1-15	
31	16	Medveščak	3 - 6	Vityaz	Dom Sportova	5,500	11-3-1-16	
32	19	Medveščak	2 - 5	Dinamo Minsk (Belarus)	Dom Sportova	5,500	11-3-1-17	
33	22	Medveščak	1 - 3	Jokerit (Finland)	Dom Sportova	6,200	11-3-1-18	
34	25	Medveščak	3 - 1	Vityaz	Dom Sportova	4,500	12-3-1-18	
35	27	Medveščak	3 - 4 OT	Lokomotiv	Dom Sportova	4,500	12-3-2-18	
36	29	Dinamo Minsk (Belarus)	4 - 3	Medveščak	Minsk-Arena	15, 086	12-3-2-19	

December: 1-1-0-4 (Home: 1-0-0-3; Road: 0-1-0-1) Pts. 5

#	Date	Home team	Score	Away team	Arena	Attendance	Record	Recap
37	3	Dinamo Moscow	2 - 3 SO	Medveščak	Luzhniki Arena	4,107	12-4-2-19	
38	5	HC Sochi	6 - 2	Medveščak	Bolshoy Ice Dome	7,794	12-4-2-20	
39	8	Medveščak	3 - 5	Barys (Kazakhstan)	Dom Sportova	4,000	12-4-2-21	
40	10	Medveščak	2 - 6	Avangard	Dom Sportova	4.500	12-4-2-22	
41	14	Medveščak	1 - 3	Salavat Yulaev Ufa	Dom Sportova	5,200	12-4-2-23	
42	22	Medveščak	5 - 3	Neftekhimik	Dom Sportova	5,200	13-4-2-23	

January: 5-2-1-2 (Home: 2-1-1-1; Road: 3-1-0-1) Pts. 20

#	Date	Home team	Score	Away team	Arena	Attendance	Record	Recap
43	4	Medveščak	5 - 4	Slovan Bratislava (Slovakia)	Dom Sportova	5,754	14-4-2-23	
44	8	Atlant	2 - 3	Medveščak	Mytishchi Arena	6,200	15-4-2-23	
45	10	Vityaz	2 - 3 OT	Medveščak	Vityaz Ice Palace	4,950	15-5-2-23	
46	12	Lokomotiv	4 - 3	Medveščak	Arena 2000	8,409	15-5-2-24	
47	15	Medveščak	3 - 4 OT	Dynamo Moscow	Dom sportova	5,000	15-5-3-24	
48	17	Medveščak	3 - 2 OT	Sochi	Dom sportova	6,250	15-6-3-24	
49	20	Medveščak	2 - 3	Atlant	Dom sportova	5,150	15-6-3-25	
50	22	Medveščak	4 - 2	Dynamo Minsk (Belarus)	Dom sportova	5,250	16-6-3-25	
51	28	Jokerit (Finland)	1 - 4	Medveščak	Hartwall Arena	9,591	17-6-3-25	
52	30	Dinamo Riga (Latvia)	1 - 2	Medveščak	Arena Riga	8,390	18-6-3-25	

February: 0-0-2-6 (Home: 0-0-1-1; Road: 0-0-1-5) Pts. 2

#	Date	Home team	Score	Away team	Arena	Attendance	Record	Recap
53	1	SKA	5 - 2	Medveščak	Ice Palace	12,177	18-6-3-26	
54	3	Dynamo Minsk (Belarus)	3 - 2	Medveščak	Minsk-Arena	13,810	18-6-3-27	
55	11	Severstal	4 - 3 SO	Medveščak	Ice Palace	2,500	18-6-4-27	
56	13	CSKA	5 - 2	Medveščak	CSKA Ice Palace	4,190	18-6-4-28	
57	15	Torpedo	3 - 1	Medveščak	Trade Union Sport Palace	5,500	18-6-4-29	
58	17	Vityaz	3 - 1	Medveščak	Vityaz Ice Palace	1,820	18-6-4-30	
59	20	Medveščak	1 - 3	Dinamo Riga (Latvia)	Dom Sportova	5,700	18-6-4-31	
60	22	Medveščak	4 - 5 SO	Jokerit (Finland)	Dom Sportova	6,200	18-6-5-31	

=== Tournaments ===
2014 Spengler Cup
Preliminary round - Group Cattini

Game	Date	Opponent	Score	Location	Attendance	Series	Recap
1	27 December 2014	Team Canada	1 - 3	Vaillant Arena, Davos, Switzerland	6,300	0-1	Archived 2014-12-28 at the Wayback Machine
2	28 December 2014	HC Davos (Switzerland)	0 - 1	Vaillant Arena, Davos, Switzerland	6,300	0-2	Archived 2014-12-28 at the Wayback Machine

Quarterfinals

Game	Date	Opponent	Score	Location	Attendance	Series	Recap
3	29 December 2014	Salavat Yulaev Ufa (Russia)	0 - 3	Vaillant Arena, Davos, Switzerland	5,934	0-3	Archived 2014-12-30 at the Wayback Machine

== Player statistics ==
Last updated: 3 Mar, 2015.
Source: Kontinental Hockey League.

=== Skaters ===
Forwards
Player	GP	G	A	Pts	PIM	+/-
Pascal Pelletier	57	16	23	39	44	−11
Bill Thomas	60	18	18	36	22	+4
Martin St. Pierre	57	10	23	33	58	−16
Brandon Segal	54	10	15	25	52	−10
James Wright	53	15	4	19	39	−2
Matt Anderson	35	9	10	19	30	+1
Edwin Hedberg	37	8	7	15	8	+6
Ville Leino	28	7	8	15	28	−1
Patrick Bjorkstrand	55	7	8	15	2	−11
Aaron Palushaj	25	3	9	12	26	−1
Mike Glumac	52	5	3	8	72	−16
Andrew Murray	51	3	4	7	14	−12
Brock Trotter	16	1	5	6	41	−1
Nathan Perkovich	50	4	1	5	78	−8
Krystofer Kolanos	6	3	2	5	2	0
Kurtis McLean	11	2	3	5	6	+1
Anthony Stewart	12	1	1	2	6	−2
Eric Beaudoin	3	1	0	1	2	−4
Darren Haydar	4	0	1	1	0	−3
Jason Krog	5	0	1	1	6	−3
Marcel Rodman	9	0	0	0	39	−2
Dario Kostović	12	0	0	0	4	0
Mike Hedden	12	0	0	0	9	−2

Defensemen
Player	GP	G	A	Pts	PIM	+/-
Mark Flood	60	8	15	23	30	−9
Mathieu Carle	45	1	18	19	38	−11
Andrew Hutchinson	53	4	11	15	75	−5
Geoff Kinrade	39	0	11	11	18	+11
Mark Katic	32	4	5	9	37	−5
Mark Popovic	46	2	6	8	20	−5
Shaone Morrisonn	48	0	7	7	78	+4
Saša Martinović	58	2	3	5	42	−19
Branislav Mezei	8	0	0	0	14	0

=== Goaltenders ===
Regular season
Player	GP	W	L	SOP	SOG	GA	SV	SV%	GAA	G	A	SO	PIM	TOI
Barry Brust	19	9	8	2	597	40	557	93.3	2.15	0	1	2	47	1116:38
Cal Heeter	22	9	9	2	609	54	555	91.1	2.65	0	0	0	2	1223:33
Mark Owuya	13	2	6	2	325	33	292	89.8	2.98	0	0	0	0	664:26
Mark Dekanich	12	0	10	0	291	47	244	83.8	4.76	0	0	0	4	591:54
Mate Tomljenović	1	0	1	0	9	3	6	66.7	9.00	0	0	0	0	20:0

== Final roster ==
No.	Nat	Player	Pos	S/G	Age	Acquired	Birthplace
1	(Croatia)	Mate Tomljenović	G	R	31	2014	Zagreb, Croatia
30	(Sweden)	Mark Owuya	G	L	35	2014	Stockholm, Sweden
31	(Canada)	Mark Dekanich	G	L	38	2013	North Vancouver, British Columbia, Canada
34	(United States)	Cal Heeter	G	L	36	2014	St. Louis, Missouri, United States
4	(Canada)	Geoff Kinrade	D	L	39	2014	Nelson, British Columbia, Canada
6	(Canada)	Mark Popovic	D	L	42	2013	Stoney Creek, Ontario, Canada
23	(Croatia)	Saša Martinović	D	L	40	2011	Füssen, West Germany
24	(United States)	Andrew Hutchinson	D	R	44	2014	Evanston, Illinois, United States
36	(Canada)	Mark Flood	D	R	40	2014	Charlottetown, Prince Edward Island, Canada
77	(Canada)	Mathieu Carle	D	R	37	2013	Gatineau, Quebec, Canada
82	(Canada)	Shaone Morrisonn	D	L	42	2014	Vancouver, British Columbia, Canada
89	(Canada)	Mark Katic	D	L	35	2013	Porcupine, Ontario, Canada
8	(Croatia)	Dario Kostović	LW	R	44	2011	Split, Croatia
9	(United States)	Bill Thomas	RW/C	R	41	2013	Pittsburgh, Pennsylvania, United States
12	(Canada)	Brandon Segal	RW	R	41	2014	Richmond, British Columbia, Canada
16	(Canada)	Mike Glumac	C/RW	R	44	2013	Niagara Falls, Ontario, Canada
17	(Canada)	Andrew Murray (A)	LW	L	43	2013	Selkirk, Manitoba, Canada
18	(Finland)	Ville Leino	LW	R	41	2014	Savonlinna, Finland
19	(Canada)	Pascal Pelletier	RW	L	41	2014	Labrador City, NL, Canada
25	(Canada)	Eric Beaudoin	LW/C	L	44	2014	Ottawa, Ontario, Canada
14	(Canada)	Krys Kolanos		R	43	2014	Calgary, Alberta, Canada
92	(Canada)	Kurtis McLean	C	R	44	2014	Kirkland Lake, Ontario, Canada
38	(Canada)	James Wright	C	R	34	2014	Saskatoon, Saskatchewan, Canada
62	(Denmark)	Patrick Bjorkstrand	C	L	32	2013	Herning, Denmark
74	(Croatia)	Nathan Perkovich	RW	R	39	2012	Canton, Michigan, United States
93	(Canada)	Martin St. Pierre	C	L	41	2014	Ottawa, Ontario, Canada
94	(Sweden)	Edwin Hedberg	LW	R	31	2014	Medellín, Colombia

Source: Eliteprospects.

=== Coaching staff ===
- Head Coach: (Canada) Doug Shedden
- Assistant Coach: (Canada) Dean Fedorchuk
- Assistant Coach: (Croatia) Alan Letang
- Assistant Coach: (Slovenia) Ivo Ratej Jr.
- Goalie Coach: (Slovenia) Klemen Mohorič

== Roster changes ==
Source: eliteprospects.com

=== Players Joining ===
Date	Player	Former team	Contract terms
2 May 2014	(United States) Andrew Hutchinson	(Switzerland) EV Zug	1 year
13 May 2014	(Canada) Shaone Morrisonn	(Finland) HC TPS	1 year
6 November 2014	(Canada) Mark Flood	(United States) Charlotte Checkers	1 year
6 November 2014	(United States) Matt Anderson	(Russia) HC Spartak Moscow	1 year
24 June 2014	(Canada) Pascal Pelletier	(United States) Utica Comets	1 year
24 June 2014	(Canada) Brock Trotter	No team	1 year
8 July 2014	(Canada) Brandon Segal	(United States) Hershey Bears	1 year
25 July 2014	(Canada) Martin St. Pierre	(Canada) Hamilton Bulldogs	1 year
29 July 2014	(Croatia) Mate Kresimir Tomljenovic	(Slovakia) HC 07 Detva	1 year
4 August 2014	(Canada) Anthony Stewart	(Switzerland) Rapperswil-Jona Lakers	1 year
31 August 2014	(Slovakia) Branislav Mezei	(Russia) HC Vityaz Podolsk	1 year
15 September 2014	(United States) Aaron Palushaj	(United States) Charlotte Checkers	1 year
15 September 2014	(Canada) James Wright	(Canada) Winnipeg Jets	1 year
12 October 2014	(Finland) Ville Leino	(United States) Buffalo Sabres	1 year
15 October 2014	(Canada) Geoff Kinrade	(Switzerland) Bern	1 year
17 October 2014	(Sweden) Edwin Hedberg	(Sweden) Modo Hockey	1 year
1 November 2014	(Sweden) Mark Owuya	(Sweden) Lulea HF	Try-out
10 January 2014	(United States) Cal Heeter	(United States) Evansville Icemen	1 year
21 November 2014	(Canada) Krys Kolanos	No team	1 year
1 December 2014	(Canada) Kurtis McLean	(Finland) Jokerit	1 year
17 December 2014	(Canada) Eric Beaudoin	No team	1 year

=== Players Leaving ===
Date	Player	New team
9 April 2014	(Sweden) Erik Nyström	(Sweden) Djurgården
5 May 2014	(Canada) Matt Ellison	(Belarus) Dinamo Minsk
5 May 2014	(Slovakia) Ivan Svarny	(Belarus) Dinamo Minsk
5 May 2014	(Canada) Jonathan Cheechoo	(Belarus) Dinamo Minsk
6 May 2014	(Canada) Charles Linglet	(Belarus) Dinamo Minsk
7 May 2014	(United States) Ryan Vesce	(Belarus) Dinamo Minsk
2 June 2014	(United States) Matt Murley	(Slovakia) Slovan Bratislava
11 June 2014	(United States) Michael Ryan	(Finland) Ässät
15 June 2014	(Croatia) Geoff Waugh	(Austria) Villacher SV
27 June 2014	(Canada) Kurtis Foster	(Slovakia) Slovan Bratislava
7 July 2014	(United States) Hugh Jessiman	(Austria) Vienna Capitals
22 July 2014	(United States) Luke Walker	(Austria) Graz 99ers
26 August 2014	(United States) Alex Westlund	China Dragon
19 September 2014	(Sweden) Christian Engstrand	(Sweden) AIK
2 October 2014	(Canada) Jason Krog	(Austria) Villacher SV
2 October 2014	(Canada) Darren Haydar	(Austria) Villacher SV
14 October 2014	(Canada) Anthony Stewart	Unknown
24 October 2014	(Slovakia) Branislav Mezei	(Slovakia) HK Nitra
30 October 2014	(Canada) Mike Hedden	(Finland) Ässät
10 November 2014	(Canada) Barry Brust	(Russia) HC Ugra
21 November 2014	(United States) Aaron Palushaj	(Russia) Avtomobilist Yekaterinburg
3 December 2014	(United States) Matt Anderson	(Russia) Neftekhimik
7 December 2014	(Slovenia) Marcel Rodman	(Austria) Klagenfurter AC
18 December 2014	(Canada) Brock Trotter	(Latvia) Dinamo Riga
2 February 2015	(Canada) Krys Kolanos	Unknown
13 February 2015	(Finland) Ville Leino	(Switzerland) Kloten
15 February 2015	(Denmark) Patrick Bjorkstrand	(Finland) SaiPa
17 February 2015	(Canada) Martin St. Pierre	(Switzerland) Lausanne

=== Player signings ===
This is the list of all players that extended their contracts with Medveščak:

Date	Player	Contract prolonged until
23 April 2014	(Canada) Mark Dekanich	End of season
23 April 2014	(Canada) Mark Katic	End of season
25 April 2014	(Croatia) Saša Martinović	End of season
25 April 2014	(Canada) Mike Glumac	End of season
25 April 2014	(Canada) Andrew Murray	End of season
25 April 2014	(Denmark) Patrick Bjorkstrand	End of season
25 April 2014	(Croatia) Nathan Perkovich	End of season
25 April 2014	(Canada) Charles Linglet	End of season
25 April 2014	(United States) Bill Thomas	End of season
25 April 2014	(Canada) Jonathan Cheechoo	End of season
27 April 2014	(Canada) Mark Popovic	End of season
5 May 2014	(Canada) Mathieu Carle	End of season
18 July 2014	(Croatia) Dario Kostović	End of season
1 September 2014	(Canada) Brock Trotter	End of season
17 December 2014	(Sweden) Mark Owuya	End of season

=== Players lost via retirement ===
Date	Player
22 July 2014	(Croatia) Alan Letang

=== Players eligible for the Croatian national ice hockey team ===
Date	Player
30 January 2015	(Canada) Nathan Perkovich
