= 2014 IIHF World Championship Division I =

Tournament details
- Host countries: South Korea; Lithuania
- Venues: 2 (in 2 host cities)
- Dates: 20–26 April
- Teams: 12

The 2014 IIHF World Championship Division I was a pair of international ice hockey tournaments organized by the International Ice Hockey Federation. Group A contested in Goyang, South Korea, and Group B contested in Vilnius, Lithuania, both running from 20 to 26 April 2014. Divisions I A and I B represent the second and the third tier of the Ice Hockey World Championships.

== Division I A ==
2014 IIHF World Championship Division I A

Tournament details
- Host country: South Korea
- Venue: 1 (in 1 host city)
- Dates: 20–26 April
- Teams: 6

Tournament statistics
- Games played: 15
- Goals scored: 97 (6.47 per game)
- Attendance: 31,822 (2,121 per game)

=== Participants ===
Team	Qualification
Austria	Placed 15th in 2013 Top Division and were relegated
Slovenia	Placed 16th in 2013 Top Division and were relegated
Hungary	Placed 3rd in 2013
Japan	Placed 4th in 2013
South Korea	Hosts, placed 5th in 2013
Ukraine	Placed 1st in 2013 Division I B and were promoted

=== Standings ===
Team	Pld	W	OTW	OTL	L	GF	GA	GD	Pts	Promotion or relegation
Slovenia	5	4	0	0	1	15	6	+9	12	Promoted to the 2015 Top Division
Austria	5	2	2	0	1	20	14	+6	10	Promoted to the 2015 Top Division
Japan	5	3	0	1	1	14	14	0	10	
Ukraine	5	2	0	1	2	18	13	+5	7	
Hungary	5	1	1	1	2	16	18	−2	6	
South Korea	5	0	0	0	5	12	30	−18	0	Relegated to the 2015 Division I B

=== Results ===
All times are local (KST – UTC+9).

20 April 2014; 12:30	Ukraine	2–3 OT (1–2, 1–0, 0–0) (OT 0–1)	Austria	Goyang Ice Rink, Goyang; Attendance: 2,371

Game reference

Sergei Gaiduchenko
Goalies
Bernhard Starkbaum
Referees:
(Czech Republic) Ján Hribik
(Switzerland) Andreas Koch
Linesmen:
(Japan) Kensuke Kanazawa
(Czech Republic) Tomáš Pešek

	0–1	09:48 – D. Heinrich (T. Koch) (PP)
R. Blagy (A. Mikhnov, Y. Belukhin) – 10:04	1–1
	1–2	12:29 – D. Heinrich (B. Lebler, M. Schumnig) (PP)
O. Materukhin (O. Tymchenko, O. Shafarenko) – 32:48	2–2
	2–3	61:34 – B. Lebler (PP)

18 min
Penalties
8 min
24
Shots
25

20 April 2014; 16:00	Japan	2–1 (0–0, 0–1, 2–0)	Slovenia	Goyang Ice Rink, Goyang; Attendance: 2,333

Game reference

Yutaka Fukufuji
Goalies
Andrej Hočevar
Referees:
(Russia) Alexei Anisimov
(Finland) Jari Leppäalho
Linesmen:
(Finland) Markku Buese
(United States) Judson Ritter

	0–1	38:51 – Ž. Pavlin (J. Muršak)
D. Obara (S. Takahasi) – 44:47	1–1
D. Akimoto (S. Takahasi, M. Nishiwaki) (PP) – 53:13	2–1

12 min
Penalties
10 min
15
Shots
27

20 April 2014; 19:30	South Korea	4–7 (0–2, 1–3, 3–2)	Hungary	Goyang Ice Rink, Goyang; Attendance: 2,775

Game reference

Son Ho-sung
Goalies
Zoltán Hetényi
Referees:
(Slovakia) Robert Mullner
(Canada) Jean-Philippe Sylvain
Linesmen:
(Sweden) Johannes Käck
(Switzerland) Roman Kaderli

	0–1	14:18 – I. Bartalis (J. Hári) (PP)
	0–2	17:43 – A. Benk (B. Sebők)
	0–3	27:12 – Zs. Azari (D. Kóger, V. Tokaji) (PP)
	0–4	34:27 – I. Sofron (J. Hári, M. Vas) (PP)
B. Radunske (Kim S-w., Lee D-k.) (PP) – 35:16	1–4
	1–5	37:49 – Cs. Kovács (J. Vas, J. Hári)
	1–6	40:46 – I. Bartalis (T. Gröschl)
B. Radunske (Kim K-s.) – 42:52	2–6
Shin S-h. (Lee Y-j., Kim W-Y.) – 47:03	3–6
Lee D-k. (Cho M-h.) (PP) – 56:01	4–6
	4–7	58:57 – I. Bartalis (J. Vas) (SH, ENG)

37 min
Penalties
14 min
28
Shots
34

21 April 2014; 12:30	Austria	4–1 (0–1, 1–0, 3–0)	Japan	Goyang Ice Rink, Goyang; Attendance: 1,616

Game reference

Bernhard Starkbaum
Goalies
Yutaka Fukufuji
Referees:
(Switzerland) Andreas Koch
(Finland) Jari Leppäalho
Linesmen:
(South Korea) Chae-Young-Jin
(Switzerland) Roman Kaderli

	0–1	05:29 – T. Yamashita (T. Saito)
S. Geier – 25:09	1–1
T. Hundertpfund (T. Koch, B. Lebler) – 44:13	2–1
Mario Altmann (K. Komarek, D. Oberkofler (PP) – 47:37	3–1
B. Lebler (T. Hundertpfund, T. Koch) (ENG) – 58:54	4–1

8 min
Penalties
28 min
39
Shots
22

21 April 2014; 16:00	Hungary	0–3 (0–1, 0–2, 0–0)	Ukraine	Goyang Ice Rink, Goyang; Attendance: 1,712

Game reference

Zoltán Hetényi
Goalies
Sergei Gaiduchenko
Referees:
(Germany) Marcus Brill
(Czech Republic) Ján Hribik
Linesmen:
(Finland) Markku Buese
(United States) Judson Ritter

0–1	04:57 – E. Belukhin (A. Mikhnov, R. Blagy) (PP)
0–2	29:49 – O. Shafarenko (O. Tymchenko, D. Petrukhno) (PP2)
0–3	30:52 – O. Tymchenko (D. Petrukhno, O. Materukhin) (PP)

20 min
Penalties
8 min
15
Shots
40

21 April 2014; 19:30	Slovenia	4–0 (0–0, 2–0, 2–0)	South Korea	Goyang Ice Rink, Goyang; Attendance: 2,347

Game reference

Luka Gračnar
Goalies
Son Ho-sung
Referees:
(Russia) Alexei Anisimov
(Canada) Jean-Philippe Sylvain
Linesmen:
(Sweden) Johannes Käck
(Switzerland) Roman Kaderli

J. Urbas (A. Mušič, M. Robar) (PP) – 25:51	1–0
M. Verlič (R. Leber, A. Kuralt) – 26:47	2–0
A. Mušič – 40:39	3–0
J. Urbas (SH, ENG) – 59:06	4–0

26 min
Penalties
12 min
33
Shots
32

23 April 2014; 12:30	Slovenia	2–0 (0–0, 2–0, 0–0)	Hungary	Goyang Ice Rink, Goyang; Attendance: 1,670

Game reference
Luka Gračnar	Goalies	Zoltán Hetényi	Referees: (Czech Republic) Ján Hribik (Finland) Jari Leppäalho; Linesmen: (Switzerland) Roman Kaderli (Czech Republic) Tomáš Pešek
T. Razingar (Ž. Pavlin) – 21:47 / 1–0; A. Kuralt (B. Gregorc) – 25:21 / 2–0			Referees: (Czech Republic) Ján Hribik (Finland) Jari Leppäalho; Linesmen: (Switzerland) Roman Kaderli (Czech Republic) Tomáš Pešek
6 min	Penalties	6 min	Referees: (Czech Republic) Ján Hribik (Finland) Jari Leppäalho; Linesmen: (Switzerland) Roman Kaderli (Czech Republic) Tomáš Pešek
25	Shots	16	Referees: (Czech Republic) Ján Hribik (Finland) Jari Leppäalho; Linesmen: (Switzerland) Roman Kaderli (Czech Republic) Tomáš Pešek

23 April 2014; 16:00	Ukraine	2–3 (1–2, 0–0, 1–1)	Japan	Goyang Ice Rink, Goyang; Attendance: 1,656

Game reference

Sergei Gaiduchenko
Goalies
Yutaka Fukufuji
Referees:
(Switzerland) Andreas Koch
(Slovakia) Robert Mullner
Linesmen:
(South Korea) Chae-Young-Jin
(Sweden) Johannes Käck

	0–1	04:31 – S. Kuji (A. Keller, G. Tanaka) (PP)
O. Materukhin (O. Tymchenko) – 07:19	1–1
	1–2	13:11 – S. Kuji (R. Hashimoto, T. Kawai)
A. Mikhnov (O. Shafarenko, R. Blahyi) – 42:54	2–2
	2–3	58:16 – T. Yamashita (D. Akimoto, T. Saito)

8 min
Penalties
20 min
26
Shots
24

23 April 2014; 19:30	Austria	7–4 (5–4, 0–0, 2–0)	South Korea	Goyang Ice Rink, Goyang; Attendance: 2,647

Game reference

Bernhard Starkbaum
Goalies
Park Sung-je
Referees:
(Russia) Alexei Anisimov
(Germany) Marcus Brill
Linesmen:
(Japan) Kensuke Kanazawa
(United States) Judson Ritter

	0–1	03:45 – Park W-s. (Kim K-s., M. Swift) (PP2)
	0–2	07:42 – Cho M-h. (M. Swift, Kim K-s.)
	0–3	08:13 – Kim K-s. (Kim S-w., B. Radunske)
M. Schiechl (B. Petrik, S. Bacher) – 09:49	1–3
T. Hundertpfund (T. Koch, M. Schlacher) – 11:12	2–3
B. Lebler (D. Heinrich, T. Koch) (PP) – 12:08	3–3
B. Lebler (M. Altmann, M. Schumig) – 14:50	4–3
	4–4	15:05 – Kim K-s. (B. Radunske, Kim S-w.)
T. Hundertpfund (B. Lebler, T. Koch) – 16:52	5–4
K. Komarek (T. Hundertpfund) – 53:31	6–4
B. Lebler (T. Koch) (PP) – 57:40	7–4

12 min
Penalties
22 min
37
Shots
29

24 April 2014; 12:30	Slovenia	5–3 (2–0, 0–2, 3–1)	Ukraine	Goyang Ice Rink, Goyang; Attendance: 1,698

Game reference

Luka Gračnar
Goalies
Sergi Gaiduchenko
Referees:
(Slovakia) Robert Mullner
(Canada) Jean-Philippe Sylvain
Linesmen:
(South Korea) Chae-Young-Jin
(Japan) Kensuke Kanazawa

M. Štebih (B. Goličič, A. Kuralt) – 12:12	1–0
J. Urbas (Ž. Pavlin, M. Rodman) – 18:09	2–0
	2–1	26:57 – A. Mikhnov (Y. Navarenko, E. Belukhin (PP)
	2–2	38:57 – D. Petrukhno (O. Materukhin) (PP)
	2–3	42:13 E. Belukhin (R. Blagy) (PP)
A. Mušič (J. Muršak, Ž. Pance) – 42:43	3–3
J. Muršak (A. Mušič, M. Robar) (PP) – 46:30	4–3
B. Goličič (A. Kuralt, T. Razingar) – 57:04	5–3

8 min
Penalties
16 min
38
Shots
16

24 April 2014; 16:00	Hungary	4–5 OT (0–0, 3–3, 1–1) (OT 0–1)	Austria	Goyang Ice Rink, Goyang; Attendance: 1,720

Game reference

Zoltán Hetényi
Goalies
Bernhard Starkbaum
Referees:
(Russia) Alexei Anisimov
(Switzerland) Andreas Koch
Linesmen:
(Finland) Markku Buese
(Sweden) Johannes Käck

I. Bartalis (B. Szirányi) (PP) – 27:11	1–0
B. Sebők (A. Benk) – 28:27	2–0
	2–1	31:50 – T. Hundertpfund (T. Koch)
	2–2	33:32 – D. Heinrich (T. Hundertpfund, T. Koch)
	2–3	35:51 – D. Heinrich (T. Hundertpfund, T. Koch) (PP)
B. Sebők (Zs. Azari, A. Benk) – 39:59	3–3
	3–4	47:40 – M. Iberer (D. Oberkofler, K. Komarek)
Cs. Kovács (B. Magosi, T. Pozsgai) – 53:51	4–4
	4–5	63:45 – B. Lebler (D. Heinrich) (PP)

4 min
Penalties
14 min
38
Shots
26

24 April 2014; 19:30	Japan	4–2 (3–0, 1–0, 0–2)	South Korea	Goyang Ice Rink, Goyang; Attendance: 2,949

Game reference

Yutaka Fukufuji
Goalies
Park Sung-je
Referees:
(Germany) Marcus Brill
(Czech Republic) Ján Hribik
Linesmen:
(Switzerland) Roman Kaderli
(Czech Republic) Tomáš Pešek

H. Ueno (S. Yanadori) – 01:14	1–0
S. Takahasi (T. Yamashita) – 03:09	2–0
H. Ueno (T. Yamashita, T. Saito) – 11:08	3–0
A. Keller (G. Tanaka, T. Kawai) (PP2) – 39:25	4–0
	4–1	41:15 – M. Swift (Kim K-s.) (PP)
	4–2	43:25 – Lee Don-ku (B. Radunske, Kim K-s.) (PP)

8 min
Penalties
12 min
26
Shots
30

26 April 2014; 12:30	Hungary	5–4 GWS (1–1, 2–2, 1–1) (OT 0–0) (SO: 3–2)	Japan	Goyang Ice Rink, Goyang; Attendance: 1,878

Game reference

Zoltán Hetényi
Goalies
Yutaka Fukufuji
Yuta Narisawa
Referees:
(Slovakia) Robert Mullner
(Canada) Jean-Philippe Sylvain
Linesmen:
(South Korea) Chae-Young-Jin
(Switzerland) Roman Kaderli

	0–1	02:58 – T. Saito (T. Yamashita)
I. Sofron (M. Vas, V. Tokaji) – 17:29	1–1
I. Bartalis (J. Vas, M. Vas) (PP) – 20:49	2–1
	2–2	26:50 – M. Nishiwaki (S. Takahashi, D. Obara)
	2–3	30:39 – S. Kuji (A. Keller, G. Tanaka)
I. Sofron (J. Hári, I. Bartalis) – 38:53	3–3
	3–4	54:30 – H. Ueno (T. Saito)
M. Vas (J. Vas, J. Hári) (EA) – 58:54	4–4

J. Hári (miss)
M. Vas
I. Sofron (miss)
M. Vas
M. Vas
Shootout
S. Kuji
(miss) H. Ueno
(miss) G. Tanaka
D. Obara
(miss) S. Kuji
20 min
Penalties
4 min
31
Shots
24

26 April 2014; 16:00	Austria	1–3 (0–0, 1–1, 0–2)	Slovenia	Goyang Ice Rink, Goyang; Attendance: 1,923

Game reference

Bernhard Starkbaum
Goalies
Luka Gračnar
Referees:
(Russia) Alexei Anisimov
(Finland) Jari Leppäalho
Linesmen:
(Sweden) Johannes Käck
(United States) Judson Ritter

	0–1	33:44 – J. Urbas
B. Petrik (S. Bacher, M. Schiechl) – 35:20	1–1
	1–2	48:49 – J. Urbas (D. Rodman, M. Podlipnik)
	1–3	58:28 – M. Štebih (J. Urbas)

6 min
Penalties
8 min
20
Shots
22

26 April 2014; 19:30	South Korea	2–8 (0–2, 0–3, 2–3)	Ukraine	Goyang Ice Rink, Goyang; Attendance: 2,527

Game reference

Park Sung-je
Goalies
Vadym Seliverstov
Referees:
(Germany) Marcus Brill
(Czech Republic) Ján Hribik
Linesmen:
(Finland) Markku Buese
(Czech Republic) Tomáš Pešek

	0–1	02:27 – D. Isayenko (R. Blagy, D. Petrukhno) (PP)
	0–2	05:34 – O. Materukhin (O. Shafarenko, O. Tymchenko)
	0–3	23:012 – R. Blagy (E. Belukhin, P. Padakin)
	0–4	38:05 – D. Petrukhno (R. Blagy, P. Padakin)
	0–5	38:29 – O. Shafarenko (O. Materukhin, Y. Navarenko)
	0–6	41:27 – O. Materukhin (O. Shafarenko, O. Tymchenko)
Kim H-j. (Chang J-i.) – 46:34	1–6
	1–7	49:01 – O. Toryanyk (M. Kvitchenko)
	1–8	49:21 – R. Blagy (I. Jugut)
B. Radunske (Lee D-k., Kim S-w.) (PP) – 53:54	2–8

6 min
Penalties
6 min
30
Shots
37

=== Awards and statistics ===
==== Awards ====
- Best players selected by the directorate:
  - Best Goalkeeper: (Japan) Yutaka Fukufuji
  - Best Defenseman: (Austria) Dominique Heinrich
  - Best Forward: (Slovenia) Jan Muršak

Source: IIHF.com

==== Scoring leaders ====
List shows the top skaters sorted by points, then goals.

Player	GP	G	A	Pts	+/−	PIM	POS
(Austria) Thomas Koch	5	0	10	10	+4	4	F
(Austria) Brian Lebler	5	6	3	9	+5	0	F
(Austria) Thomas Hundertpfund	5	4	4	8	+5	2	F
(Ukraine) Roman Blagy	5	3	5	8	+5	2	F
(Slovenia) Jan Urbas	5	5	2	7	+7	2	F
(Ukraine) Oleksandr Materukhin	5	4	3	7	+1	2	F
(South Korea) Kim Ki-sung	5	2	5	7	−1	2	F
(Hungary) István Bartalis	5	5	1	6	0	0	F
(Austria) Dominique Heinrich	5	4	2	6	+1	2	D
(South Korea) Brock Radunske	5	3	3	6	−2	10	F

GP = Games played; G = Goals; A = Assists; Pts = Points; +/− = Plus/minus; PIM = Penalties in minutes; POS = Position
Source: IIHF.com

==== Leading goaltenders ====
Only the top five goaltenders, based on save percentage, who have played at least 40% of their team's minutes, are included in this list.

Player	TOI	GA	GAA	SA	Sv%	SO
(Slovenia) Luka Gračnar	240:00	4	1.00	99	95.96	2
(Japan) Yutaka Fukufuji	287:36	11	2.29	144	92.36	0
(Austria) Bernhard Starkbaum	304:31	14	2.76	133	89.47	0
(Ukraine) Sergei Gaiduchenko	240:52	11	2.74	102	89.22	1
(Hungary) Zoltán Hetényi	306:20	18	3.53	147	87.76	0

TOI = Time on Ice (minutes:seconds); SA = Shots against; GA = Goals against; GAA = Goals against average; Sv% = Save percentage; SO = Shutouts
Source: IIHF.com

== Division I B ==
2014 IIHF World Championship Division I B

Tournament details
- Host country: Lithuania
- Venue: 1 (in 1 host city)
- Dates: 20–26 April
- Teams: 6

Tournament statistics
- Games played: 15
- Goals scored: 85 (5.67 per game)
- Attendance: 41,224 (2,748 per game)

=== Participants ===
Team	Qualification
Great Britain	Placed 6th in 2013 Division I A and were relegated
Poland	Placed 2nd in 2013
Netherlands	Placed 3rd in 2013
Romania	Placed 4th in 2013
Lithuania	Hosts, placed 5th in 2013
Croatia	Placed 1st in 2013 Division II A and were promoted

=== Standings ===
Team	Pld	W	OTW	OTL	L	GF	GA	GD	Pts	Promotion or relegation
Poland	5	4	0	0	1	21	8	+13	12	Promoted to the 2015 Division I A
Croatia	5	3	1	0	1	16	9	+7	11	
Lithuania	5	3	0	0	2	15	9	+6	9	
Great Britain	5	3	0	0	2	13	12	+1	9	
Netherlands	5	1	0	0	4	13	18	−5	3	
Romania	5	0	0	1	4	7	29	−22	1	Relegated to the 2015 Division II A

=== Results ===
All times are local (EEST – UTC+3).

20 April 2014; 13:00	Croatia	4–0 (2–0, 1–0, 1–0)	Great Britain	Siemens Arena, Vilnius; Attendance: 792

Game reference

Mate Tomljenović
Goalies
Stephen Murphy
Ben Bowns
Referee:
(Latvia) Juris Balodis
Linesmen:
(Belarus) Dmitri Golyak
(Austria) David Nothegger

M. Novak (N. Senzel, T. Mirić) – 12:56	1–0
D. Kostović (M. Šakić) – 19:19	2–0
A. Letang (I. Janković, M. Blagus) – 27:26	3–0
D. Kostović – 46:12	4–0

18 min
Penalties
8 min
18
Shots
33

20 April 2014; 16:30	Romania	0–7 (0–2, 0–3, 0–2)	Poland	Siemens Arena, Vilnius; Attendance: 809

Game reference

Gellért Ruczuj
Adrian Catrinoi
Goalies
Przemyslaw Odrobny
Referee:
(Norway) Per Gustav Solem
Linesmen:
(Hungary) Balázs Kovács
(Denmark) Jonas Reimer

0–1	02:11 – P. Dronia (M. Kolusz, K. Zapała)
0–2	18:07 – L. Laszkiewicz (J. Witecki)
0–3	27:15 – T. Malasinski (K. Zapała)
0–4	37:57 – S. Kowalowka (G. Pasiut, L. Laszkiewicz) (PP)
0–5	39:14 – M. Kolusz (R. Dutka, P. Dronia) (PP)
0–6	42:19 – L. Laszkiewicz (M. Lopuski)
0–7	43:24 – T. Malasinski (K. Zapała, M. Kolusz)

8 min
Penalties
8 min
14
Shots
36

20 April 2014; 20:00	Lithuania	4–0 (1–0, 0–0, 3–0)	Netherlands	Siemens Arena, Vilnius; Attendance: 4,525

Game reference

Mantas Armalis
Goalies
Ian Meierdres
Martijn Oosterwijk
Referee:
(Canada) Pascal St-Jacques
Linesmen:
(Latvia) Raivis Jucers
(Russia) Alexander Otmakhov

D. Kumeliauskas (A. Bosas) – 16:35	1–0
P. Gintautas (D. Boddziul, A. Fiscevas) – 45:55	2–0
D. Zubrus (P. Rulevičius, M. Kieras) (PP) – 55:33	3–0
M. Kieras (D. Pliskauskas, E. Rybakov) – 59:59	4–0

10 min
Penalties
8 min
32
Shots
23

21 April 2014; 13:00	Great Britain	4–1 (0–0, 2–0, 2–1)	Romania	Siemens Arena, Vilnius; Attendance: 739

Game reference

Ben Bowns
Goalies
Adrian Catrinoi
Referee:
(Canada) Pascal St-Jacques
Linesmen:
(Belarus) Dmitri Golyak
(Sweden) Ludvig Lundgren

B. Davies (D. Clarke, R. Lachowicz) (PP) – 32:45	1–0
J. Phillips (M. Garside, D. Meyers) – 34:35	2–0
C. Shields (B. O'Connor, R. Farmer) (PP) – 45:47	3–0
	3–1	59:16 – O. Biro (Y. Pysarenko, E. Moldovan)
M. Garside (D. Meyers, B. O'Connor) – 59:34	4–1

8 min
Penalties
14 min
47
Shots
26

21 April 2014; 16:30	Netherlands	0–4 (0–2, 0–2, 0–0)	Croatia	Siemens Arena, Vilnius; Attendance: 984

Game reference

Martijn Oosterwijk
Goalies
Mate Tomljenović
Referee:
(Norway) Per Gustav Solem
Linesmen:
(Austria) David Nothegger
(Denmark) Jonas Reimer

0–1	04:47 – T. Mirić (M. Ljubić, A. Letang)
0–2	06:26 – M. Novak (B. Rendulić, M. Tadić)
0–3	26:51 – M. Blagus (B. Rendulić, M. Novak)
0–4	29:26 – I. Brenčun (A. Letang, M. Ljubić) (SH)

6 min
Penalties
10 min
24
Shots
28

21 April 2014; 20:00	Poland	3–2 (1–0, 1–1, 1–1)	Lithuania	Siemens Arena, Vilnius; Attendance: 6,138

Game reference

Przemyslaw Odrobny
Goalies
Mantas Armalis
Referee:
(Hungary) Péter Gebei
Linesmen:
(Latvia) Raivis Jucers
(Hungary) Balázs Kovács

L. Laszkiewicz (M. Lopuski) – 01:55	1–0
T. Malasinski (P. Dronia, K. Zapała) (PP) – 27:11	2–0
	2–1	34:12 – D. Kumeliauskas (D. Zubrus, N. Alisauskas) (PP)
G. Pasiut (A. Chmielewski) – 47:57	3–1
	3–2	58:41 – D. Pliskauskas (D. Kumeliauskas, D. Zubrus) (EA)

14 min
Penalties
6 min
30
Shots
35

23 April 2014; 13:00	Poland	5–1 (0–0, 1–0, 4–1)	Netherlands	Siemens Arena, Vilnius; Attendance: 707

Game reference

Przemysław Odrobny
Goalies
Martijn Oosterwijk
Referee:
(Latvia) Juris Balodis
Linesmen:
(Sweden) Ludvig Lundgren
(Russia) Alexander Otmakhov

M. Kolusz (K. Zapała, P. Dronia) – 25:52	1–0
A. Chmielewski (B. Pociecha, L. Laszkiewicz) (PP) – 44:18	2–0
M. Strzyżowski (K. Dziubinski) – 44:28	3–0
T. Malasinski (R. Dutka) – 55:59	4–0
	4–1	57:38 – J. van Oorschot (M. Brekelmans)
M. Lopuski (L. Laszkiewicz) – 59:50	5–1

10 min
Penalties
12 min
45
Shots
20

23 April 2014; 16:30	Croatia	4–3 GWS (0–1, 1–1, 2–1) (OT: 0–0) (SO: 2–1)	Romania	Siemens Arena, Vilnius; Attendance: 1,011

Game reference

Mate Tomljenović
Goalies
Adrian Catrinoi
Referee:
(Hungary) Péter Gebei
Linesmen:
(Belarus) Dmitri Golyak
(Austria) David Nothegger

	0–1	07:32 – L. Zsók (A. Imecs, Y. Pysarenko) (PP)
	0–2	24:37 – E. Mihály (C. Fodor)
B. Rendulić (I. Jacmenjak) – 30:24	1–2
	1–3	46:20 – H. Bors (Z. Mastaleriu, M. Bíró) (PP)
K. MacAulay (M. Novak, D. Kostović) – 53:27	2–3
T. Mirić (L. Vukoja, A. Letang – 57:22	3–3

B. Rendulić (miss)
M. Novak
I. Jacmenjak
Shootout
(miss) I. Timaru
C. Fodor
(miss) C. Nagy
12 min
Penalties
14 min
39
Shots
22

23 April 2014; 20:00	Great Britain	1–2 (0–1, 1–1, 0–0)	Lithuania	Siemens Arena, Vilnius; Attendance: 6,312

Game reference

Ben Bowns
Goalies
Mantas Armalis
Referee:
(Norway) Per Gustav Solem
Linesmen:
(Hungary) Balázs Kovács
(Denmark) Jonas Reimer

	0–1	03:59 – A. Bosas (Dainius Zubrus, M. Kieras)
R. Dowd (B. Davies, D. Phillips) – 24:41	1–1
	1–2	31:06 – D. Zubrus (D. Kumeliauskas, A. Bosas) (PP)

8 min
Penalties
6 min
23
Shots
15

24 April 2014; 13:00	Poland	4–1 (1–0, 1–1, 2–0)	Croatia	Siemens Arena, Vilnius; Attendance: 808

Game reference

Przemyslaw Odrobny
Goalies
Mate Tomljenović
Referee:
(Canada) Pascal St-Jacques
Linesmen:
(Latvia) Raivis Jucers
(Russia) Alexander Otmakhov

S. Kowalowka (G. Pasiut, A. Chmielewski) – 09:46	1–0
M. Kolusz (K. Zapała, P. Dronia) (PP) – 25:25	2–0
	2–1	32:31 – D. Kanaet (A. Letang, G. Waugh)
S. Kowalowka (A. Chmielewski, B. Pociecha) – 55:21	3–1
L. Laszkiewicz (G. Pasiut) (ENG) – 59:49	4–1

6 min
Penalties
6 min
38
Shots
17

24 April 2014; 16:30	Netherlands	3–4 (1–2, 0–1, 2–1)	Great Britain	Siemens Arena, Vilnius; Attendance: 997

Game reference

Martijn Oostersijk
Goalies
Ben Bowns
Referee:
(Hungary) Péter Gebei
Linesmen:
(Sweden) Ludvig Lundgren
(Austria) David Nothegger

	0–1	00:33 – C. Shields (D. Phillips, D. Meyers)
	0–2	00:51 – D. Clarke (M. Garside, A. Tait)
N. Nagtzaam (J. van Oorschot) – 10:11	1–2
	1–3	34:48 – D. Meyers (B. Davies)
N. Nagtzaam (L. Houkes, R. Wurm) – 40:34	2–3
	2–4	42:35 – M. Myers (D. Clarke, J. Weaver) (PP)
K. Bruijsten (J. van Oorschot, N. de Jong) (PP) – 45:58	3–4

20 min
Penalties
42 min
32
Shots
21

24 April 2014; 20:00	Romania	2–5 (0–1, 0–1, 2–3)	Lithuania	Siemens Arena, Vilnius; Attendance: 5,687

Game reference

Gellert Ruczuj
Goalies
Mantas Armalis
Referee:
(Latvia) Juris Balodis
Linesmen:
(Belarus) Dmitri Golyak
(Denmark) Jonas Reimer

	0–1	06:40 – D. Kumeliauskas (D. Zubrus, M. Kieras)
	0–2	29:39 – A. Katulis (D. Zubrus, D. Kumeliauskas)
L. Zsók (Y. Pysarenko, A. Imecs) (PP) – 42:43	1–2
	1–3	44:53 – D. Kumeliauskas
	1–4	50:37 – A. Bosas (PP)
C. Fodor (Y. Pysarenko, E. Mihály) (PP, EA) – 58:04	2–4
	2–5	59:32 – A. Bosas (D. Kumeliauskas, D. Zubrus) (ENG)

33 min
Penalties
20 min
22
Shots
17

26 April 2014; 13:00	Netherlands	9–1 (3–0, 2–0, 4–1)	Romania	Siemens Arena, Vilnius; Attendance: 1,009

Game reference

Martijn Oosterwijk
Goalies
Adrian Catrinoi
Gellért Ruczuj
Referee:
(Norway) Per Gustav Solem
Linesmen:
(Latvia) Raivis Jucers
(Hungary) Balázs Kovács

S. Mason (D. Hagemeijer, I. van den Heuvel) – 06:52	1–0
I. van den Heuvel (D. Hagemeijer) – 15:53	2–0
M. Postma (D. van de Velden, J. Oosterveld) – 18:35	3–0
M. Bruijsten (K. Bruijsten, E. Tummers) – 25:13	4–0
D. Hagemeijer (E. Tummers) (PP) – 31:17	5–0
M. Brekelmans (J. Oosterveld, M. Postma) – 47:00	6–0
N. Nagtzaam – 47:48	7–0
T. Demelinne (K. Bruijsten) (SH) – 52:11	8–0
	8–1	53:02 – M. Georgescu (H. Bors, E. Moldovan) (PP)
I. van den Heuvel (D. Hagemeijer) – 59:55	9–1

6 min
Penalties
4 min
33
Shots
17

26 April 2014; 16:30	Great Britain	4–2 (0–0, 2–1, 2–1)	Poland	Siemens Arena, Vilnius; Attendance: 3,206

Game reference

Ben Bowns
Goalies
Kamil Kosowski
Referee:
(Latvia) Juris Balodis
Linesmen:
(Sweden) Ludvig Lundgren
(Russia) Alexander Otmakhov

C. Shields (R. Lachowicz, J. Weaver) – 22:54	1–0
C. Shields (R. Lachowicz, B. Davies) – 28:29	2–0
	2–1	35:28 – P. Dronia (K. Zapała) (PP)
	2–2	45:31 – K. Dziubinski
R. Dowd (C. Shields, J. Weaver) (PP2) – 52:34	3–2
C. Shields (M. Garside) (ENG) – 58:31	4–2

10 min
Penalties
14 min
34
Shots
24

26 April 2014; 20:00	Lithuania	2–3 (0–0, 1–2, 1–1)	Croatia	Siemens Arena, Vilnius; Attendance: 7,500

Game reference

Mantas Armalis
Goalies
Mate Tomljenović
Referee:
(Hungary) Péter Gebei
Linesmen:
(Belarus) Dmitri Golyak
(Austria) David Nothegger

	0–1	30:27 – G. Waugh (M. Blagus, D. Kostović) (PP)
	0–2	32:10 – T. Mirić (M. Novak) (PP)
E. Rybakov (S. Kuliešius) – 33:23	1–2
D. Pliskauskas (A. Kaminskas) – 43:38	2–2
	2–3	53:41 – B. Rendulić (D. Kostović, K. MacAulay)

16 min
Penalties
16 min
30
Shots
17

=== Awards and statistics ===
==== Awards ====
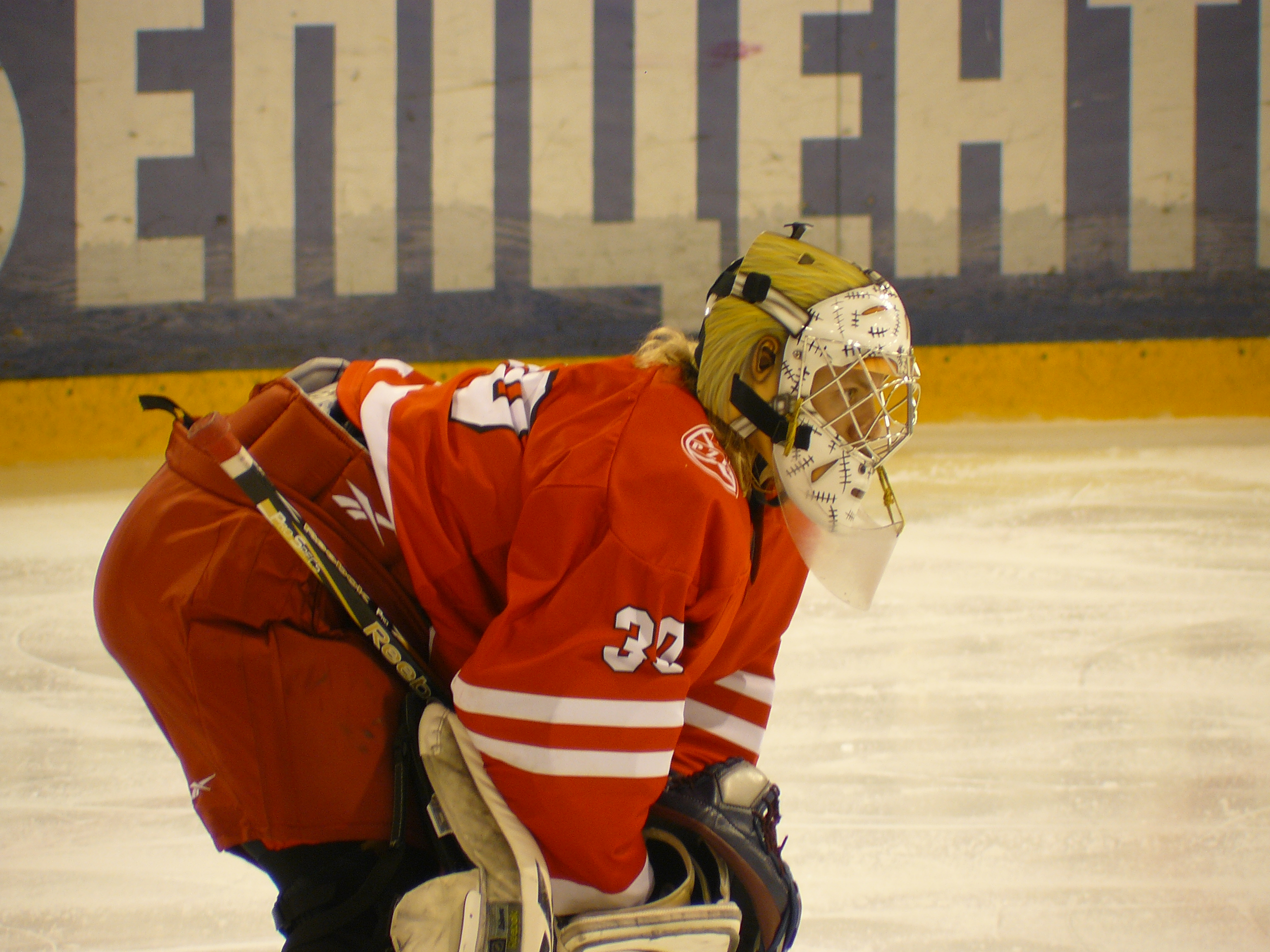
Przemysław Odrobny of Poland was selected as the best goalkeeper.

- Best players selected by the directorate:
  - Best Goalkeeper: (Poland) Przemyslaw Odrobny
  - Best Defenseman: (Croatia) Alan Letang
  - Best Forward: (Lithuania) Dainius Zubrus

Source: IIHF.com

==== Scoring leaders ====
List shows the top skaters sorted by points, then goals.

Player	GP	G	A	Pts	+/−	PIM	POS
(Lithuania) Dainius Zubrus	5	2	7	9	+7	4	F
(Lithuania) Donatas Kumeliauskas	5	4	4	8	+7	16	F
(Poland) Leszek Laszkiewicz	5	4	3	7	+5	4	F
(Poland) Krzysztof Zapała	5	0	7	7	+3	6	F
(United Kingdom) Colin Shields	5	5	1	6	+2	0	F
(Lithuania) Arnoldas Bosas	5	4	2	6	+6	10	F
(Poland) Pawel Dronia	5	2	4	6	+2	4	D
(Poland) Marcin Kolusz	5	3	2	5	+2	0	F
(Croatia) Dario Kostović	5	2	3	5	+1	2	F
(Croatia) Alan Letang	5	1	4	5	+2	2	D

GP = Games played; G = Goals; A = Assists; Pts = Points; +/− = Plus/minus; PIM = Penalties in minutes; POS = Position
Source: IIHF.com

==== Leading goaltenders ====
Only the top five goaltenders, based on save percentage, who have played at least 40% of their team's minutes, are included in this list.

Player	TOI	GA	GAA	SA	Sv%	SO
(Poland) Przemyslaw Odrobny	240:00	4	1.00	86	95.35	1
(Croatia) Mate Tomljenović	303:16	8	1.58	146	94.52	2
(Lithuania) Mantas Armalis	298:42	9	1.81	115	92.17	1
(United Kingdom) Ben Bowns	252:28	8	1.90	100	92.00	0
(Romania) Adrian Catrinoi	164:11	12	4.39	109	88.99	0

TOI = Time on Ice (minutes:seconds); SA = Shots against; GA = Goals against; GAA = Goals against average; Sv% = Save percentage; SO = Shutouts
Source: IIHF.com
