= Kostović =

Kostović is a Croatian and Serbian surname. The surname may refer to:

- Dario Kostović (born 1980), Swiss-Croatian ice hockey player
- Ivica Kostović (born 1943), Croatian physician and politician
- Ognjeslav Kostović Stepanović (1851–1916), Serbian inventor
