= Saša Martinović (ice hockey player) =

Croatian professional ice hockey player (born 1984)

- Born: 27 September 1984 (age 41) Füssen, West Germany
- Height: 6 ft 1 in (185 cm)
- Weight: 209 lb (95 kg; 14 st 13 lb)
- Position: Defence
- Shoots: Left
- DEL2 team Former teams: Tölzer Löwen; Hamburg Freezers; Krefeld Pinguine; ERC Ingolstadt; Grizzly Adams Wolfsburg; KHL Medveščak Zagreb; Thomas Sabo Ice Tigers; Iserlohn Roosters
- National team: Croatia
- Playing career: 2001–present

Saša Martinović (born 27 September 1984) is a Croatian former professional ice hockey player born in Germany (Croatian diaspora). He played with the Iserlohn Roosters and the Thomas Sabo Ice Tigers after four seasons with KHL Medveščak of the Kontinental Hockey League (KHL). Martinović previously played for five teams in Deutsche Eishockey Liga.

On 21 April 2017 Martinovic left the Ice Tigers after two seasons as a free agent to sign a one-year deal with the Iserlohn Roosters. Martinovic played with the Roosters for two years before leaving as a free agent following the 2018–19 season on 9 March 2019.

On July 1, 2019, Martinovic agreed to continue his career in Germany, signing a one-year deal with DEL2 club, Tölzer Löwen.

== Career statistics ==
=== Regular season and playoffs ===
			Regular season					Playoffs
Season	Team	League	GP	G	A	Pts	PIM	GP	G	A	Pts	PIM
2001–02	EV Füssen	3.GBun	50	5	10	15	24	4	2	1	3	2
2002–03	EV Füssen	3.GBun	53	4	11	15	60	3	1	2	3	0
2003–04	EV Füssen	3.GBun	36	10	15	25	58	18	3	13	16	42
2004–05	Hamburg Freezers	DEL	52	1	3	4	30	6	0	1	1	16
2004–05	Eispiraten Crimmitschau	2.GBun	1	0	0	0	2	—	—	—	—	—
2005–06	Hamburg Freezers	DEL	37	0	0	0	24	1	0	0	0	0
2006–07	Krefeld Pinguine	DEL	51	2	10	12	44	2	0	0	0	2
2007–08	Krefeld Pinguine	DEL	49	1	16	17	42	—	—	—	—	—
2008–09	ERC Ingolstadt	DEL	51	1	3	4	26	—	—	—	—	—
2009–10	Grizzly Adams Wolfsburg	DEL	56	4	8	12	48	7	0	1	1	6
2010–11	Grizzly Adams Wolfsburg	DEL	39	0	3	3	18	9	0	0	0	0
2011–12	KHL Medveščak Zagreb	EBEL	42	2	8	10	79	9	0	0	0	20
2012–13	KHL Medveščak Zagreb	EBEL	53	3	11	14	73	6	1	0	1	4
2013–14	KHL Medveščak Zagreb	KHL	43	0	4	4	22	4	1	0	1	2
2014–15	KHL Medveščak Zagreb	KHL	58	2	3	5	42	—	—	—	—	—
2015–16	Thomas Sabo Ice Tigers	DEL	38	1	7	8	20	12	2	2	4	8
2016–17	Thomas Sabo Ice Tigers	DEL	38	5	4	9	26	13	0	0	0	2
2017–18	Iserlohn Roosters	DEL	51	2	14	16	18	2	0	1	1	2
2018–19	Iserlohn Roosters	DEL	36	4	9	13	26	—	—	—	—	—
DEL totals			498	21	77	98	322	52	2	5	7	36

=== International ===
Year	Team	Event	Result	GP	G	A	Pts	PIM
2014	Croatia	WC-D1	24th	2	0	0	0	2
2015	Croatia	WC-D1	26th	5	0	1	1	31
Senior totals				7	0	1	1	33
