= Serhiy Haiduchenko =

Ukrainian ice hockey player (born 1989)

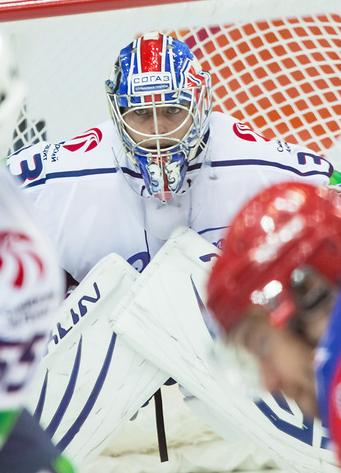
- Born: 6 June 1989 (age 36) Kyiv, Ukrainian SSR, Soviet Union
- Height: 6 ft 5 in (196 cm)
- Weight: 222 lb (101 kg; 15 st 12 lb)
- Position: Goaltender
- Caught: Left
- Played for: Metallurg Novokuznetsk; Lokomotiv Yaroslavl; HC CSKA Moscow; HC Sibir Novosibirsk; KHL Medveščak Zagreb
- National team: Ukraine
- NHL draft: 202nd overall, 2007; Florida Panthers
- Playing career: 2008–2018

Serhiy Haiduchenko (Ukrainian: Сергій Гайдученко; Russian: Серге́й Гайдученко, Sergei Gaiduchenko; born 6 June 1989) is a Ukrainian former professional ice hockey goaltender. His career lasted from 2006 until 2018, mainly spent in the Kontinental Hockey League (KHL). He was also selected by the Florida Panthers in the 2007 NHL entry draft, though he never played in North America. Internationally Gaiduchenko played for Ukraine in two World Championships, in 2014 and 2018, both at the Division I level.

== Early career ==
Haiduchenko began his career in Kyiv, playing for the junior team at the Ldinka Hockey School. His first coach was Anatolii Donika, a successful former defenseman of the team Sokil Kyiv. Scouts from Yaroslavl took notice of his play and invited him to move there and join the organization. He was selected by the Florida Panthers, 202nd overall in the 2007 NHL entry draft, after a junior career within Lokomotiv Yaroslavl.

== International Play ==
Medal record

Ice hockey

Representing Russia

World Junior A Challenge
Bronze medal – third place	2006 Yorkton	

The Ukrainian national team approached Haiduchenko to join early in his career, but he declined, instead hoping to play for the Russian national team. However, due to IIHF rules concerning changing nationality, he did not qualify to play for the Russian team until after 24 June 2008. He played with the Russian Under-18 squad in two non-IIHF events prior to this date, however, since becoming eligible he has not played for Russia. He held negotiations to play for the Ukrainian team in 2011 but still withheld. In 2014, he finally joined the team, making his full senior international debut playing in the 2014 IIHF World Championship Division I.

== Career statistics ==
=== Regular season and playoffs ===
			Regular season									Playoffs
Season	Team	League	GP	W	L	T/OT	MIN	GA	SO	GAA	SV%	GP	W	L	MIN	GA	SO	GAA	SV%
2007–08	Metallurg Novokuznetsk	RSL	11	3	3	0	—	27	—	2.92	.892	—	—	—	—	—	—	—	—
2008–09	Lokomotiv Yaroslavl	KHL	3	2	0	1	184	5	0	1.62	.942	—	—	—	—	—	—	—	—
2009–10	Lokomotiv Yaroslavl	KHL	20	11	7	0	1090	44	0	2.42	.922	—	—	—	—	—	—	—	—
2010–11	CSKA Moscow	KHL	23	4	13	6	120	58	1	2.90	.893	—	—	—	—	—	—	—	—
2011–12	CSKA Moscow	KHL	13	2	6	4	623	30	0	2.89	.904	2	0	0	104	7	0	4.01	.854
2012–13	HC Sibir Novosibirsk	KHL	19	6	9	2	974	39	1	2.40	.926	1	0	0	20	2	0	6.00	.778
2013–14	HC Sibir Novosibirsk	KHL	8	2	5	1	438	25	0	3.42	.884	—	—	—	—	—	—	—	—
2014–15	Kuban Krasnodar	VHL	25	8	10	3	1308	53	1	2.43	.930	1	0	1	62	4	0	3.87	.900
2016–17	KHL Medveščak Zagreb	KHL	7	0	5	0	340	27	0	4.76	.867	—	—	—	—	—	—	—	—
KHL totals			93	27	44	13	4852	228	2	2.82	.907	3	0	0	124	9	0	4.33	.842

=== International ===
Year	Team	Comp	GP	W	L	T	MIN	GA	SO	GAA	SV%
2006	Russia	IH18	2	—	—	—	—	—	—	—	—
2014	Ukraine	WC-D1	4	1	2	1	241	11	1	2.74	.892
2018	Ukraine	WC-D1	4	1	1	0	148	6	1	2.44	.933
Junior totals			2	—	—	—	—	—	—	—	—
Senior totals			8	2	3	1	389	17	1	2.62	.912
