= Mark Garside =

Scottish ice hockey player

- Born: 21 March 1989 (age 35); East Kilbride, Scotland, UK
- Height: 5 ft 10 in (178 cm)
- Weight: 170 lb (77 kg; 12 st 2 lb)
- Position: Defence
- Shot: Left
- Played for: Edinburgh Capitals; Nottingham Panthers; Belfast Giants
- National team: Great Britain
- NHL draft: Undrafted
- Playing career: 2006–2024

Mark Garside (born 21 March 1989 in East Kilbride) is a former Scottish professional ice hockey player. He last played defence for the Belfast Giants of the EIHL.

Garside announced his retirement from professional hockey in June 2024.
