= Miha Štebih =

Slovenian ice hockey player

- Born: April 7, 1992 (age 34) Maribor, Slovenia
- Height: 6 ft 3 in (191 cm)
- Weight: 201 lb (91 kg; 14 st 5 lb)
- Position: Defence
- Shoots: Left
- EBEL team Former teams: EC VSV; BK Mladá Boleslav; HC Oceláři Třinec
- National team: Slovenia
- NHL draft: Undrafted
- Playing career: 2009–present

Miha Štebih (born 7 April 1992) is a Slovenian professional ice hockey player who is a defenceman for Cracovia of the Polska Hokej Liga (PHL).

He respresented Slovenia national team at the 2015 IIHF World Championship.
