= Zsolt Azari =

Hungarian ice hockey player (born 1986)

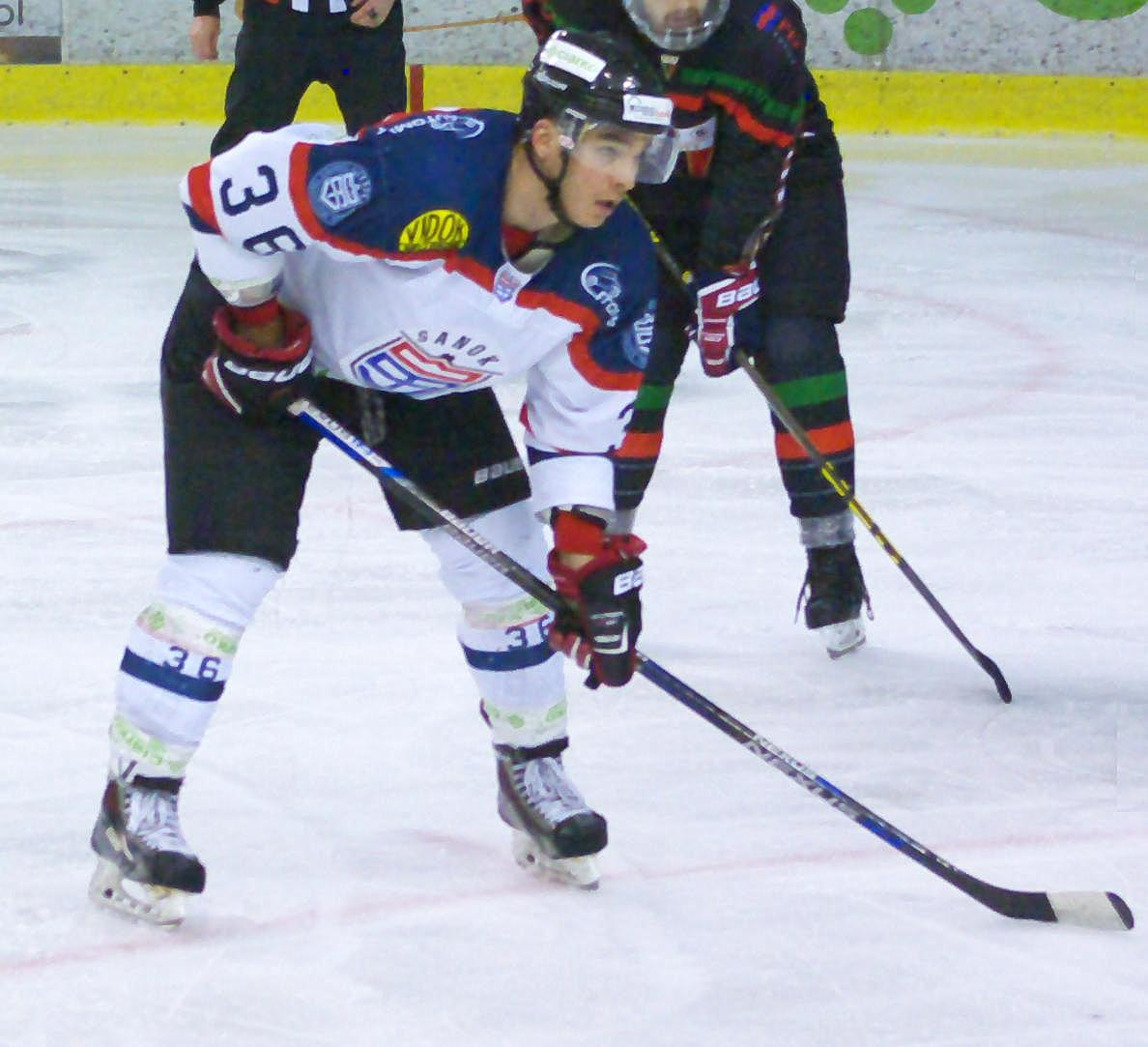
- Born: 30 August 1986 (age 40) Dunaújváros, Hungary
- Height: 6 ft 0 in (183 cm)
- Weight: 194 lb (88 kg; 13 st 12 lb)
- Position: Forward
- Shoots: Left
- MOL Liga team Former teams: Dunaújvárosi Acélbikák; STS Sanok; HK Ruzinov 99 Bratislava
- National team: Hungary
- Playing career: 2002–present

Zsolt Azari (born 30 August 1986 in Dunaújváros, Hungary) is a professional Hungarian ice hockey player. He is currently playing and has played most of his professional career with him hometown team, Dunaújvárosi Acélbikák, in the MOL Liga.

== Career ==
In 2002, his senior debut, he made five appearances for the Hungarian U18 national team at the U18 World Championships, collecting a total of 5 points. Next year he was selected both for the U18 and U20 World Cup. He later represented his country on further two U20 World Cups, having won the gold medal on the 2005 World Junior Ice Hockey Championships.

Azari played with Slovakian second-tier team HK Ruzinov 99 Bratislava in the 2005-06 season, playing mostly in the junior team.

From 2006 until 2015, he was a regular first team player of the Acélbikák. He transferred to Ciarko PBS Bank STS Sanok in Poland in November 2015. He returned to his first team at the end of the 2015-16 season.

== Career statistics ==
=== Regular season and playoffs ===
			Regular season					Playoffs
Season	Team	League	GP	G	A	Pts	PIM	GP	G	A	Pts	PIM
2002–03	Dunaújvárosi Acélbikák	IEL	4	0	0	0	0
2003–04	Dunaújvárosi Acélbikák	OB I	17	1	4	5	8
2004–05	Dunaújvárosi Acélbikák	IEL	17	0	2	2	27
2004–05	Dunaújvárosi Acélbikák	OB I	16	2	3	5	4
2005–06	Dunaújvárosi Acélbikák	IEL	14	1	3	4	8
2005–06	HK Ruzinov 99 Bratislava	Slovakian First League	1	0	0	0	0
2005–06	HK Ruzinov 99 Bratislava U20	Slovakian Junior League	10	3	7	10	14
2006–07	Dunaújvárosi Acélbikák	OB I	40	13	17	30	—
2007–08	Dunaújvárosi Acélbikák	OB I	36	5	7	12	40
2008–09	Dunaújvárosi Acélbikák	OB I	36	19	23	42	50
2009–10	Dunaújvárosi Acélbikák	OB I	26	8	31	39	42
2010–11	Dunaújvárosi Acélbikák	OB I	28	14	24	38	55	10	7	3	10	14
2011–12	Dunaújvárosi Acélbikák	OB I	21	15	17	32	20	5	0	3	3	4
2012–13	Dunaújvárosi Acélbikák	OB I	44	17	26	43	48	10	3	1	4	20
2013–14	Dunaújvárosi Acélbikák	OB I	46	15	29	44	32	4	1	0	1	2
2014–15	Dunaújvárosi Acélbikák	OB I	41	19	32	51	60	5	0	3	2	2
2015–16	Dunaújvárosi Acélbikák	OB I	23	9	13	22	8
2015–16	STS Sanok	PHL	18	4	2	6	10	3	0	1	1	0
MOL Liga Career totals			267	115	195	310	339	35	13	14	27	65

=== International statistics ===
Year	Team	Comp	GP	G	A	Pts	PIM
2003	Hungary	WJC-18 D2	5	3	2	5	10
2004	Hungary	WJC-18 D2	5	4	6	10	16
2004	Hungary	WJC-20 D1	5	0	0	0	6
2005	Hungary	WJC-20 D2	5	3	6	9	8
2006	Hungary	WJC-20 D1	5	0	0	0	14
2007	Hungary	International	9	2	1	3	4
2008	Hungary	International	1	0	0	0	0
2010	Hungary	International	3	0	2	2	0
2011	Hungary	International	8	1	2	3	2
2012	Hungary	International	5	0	0	0	2
2014	Hungary	WC D1A	5	2	1	3	2
2014	Hungary	International	10	3	1	4	4
2015	Hungary	International	2	1	1	2	0
Junior int'l totals			25	10	14	24	54
Senior int'l totals			43	9	8	17	14
