= Geoff Kinrade =

Canadian ice hockey player

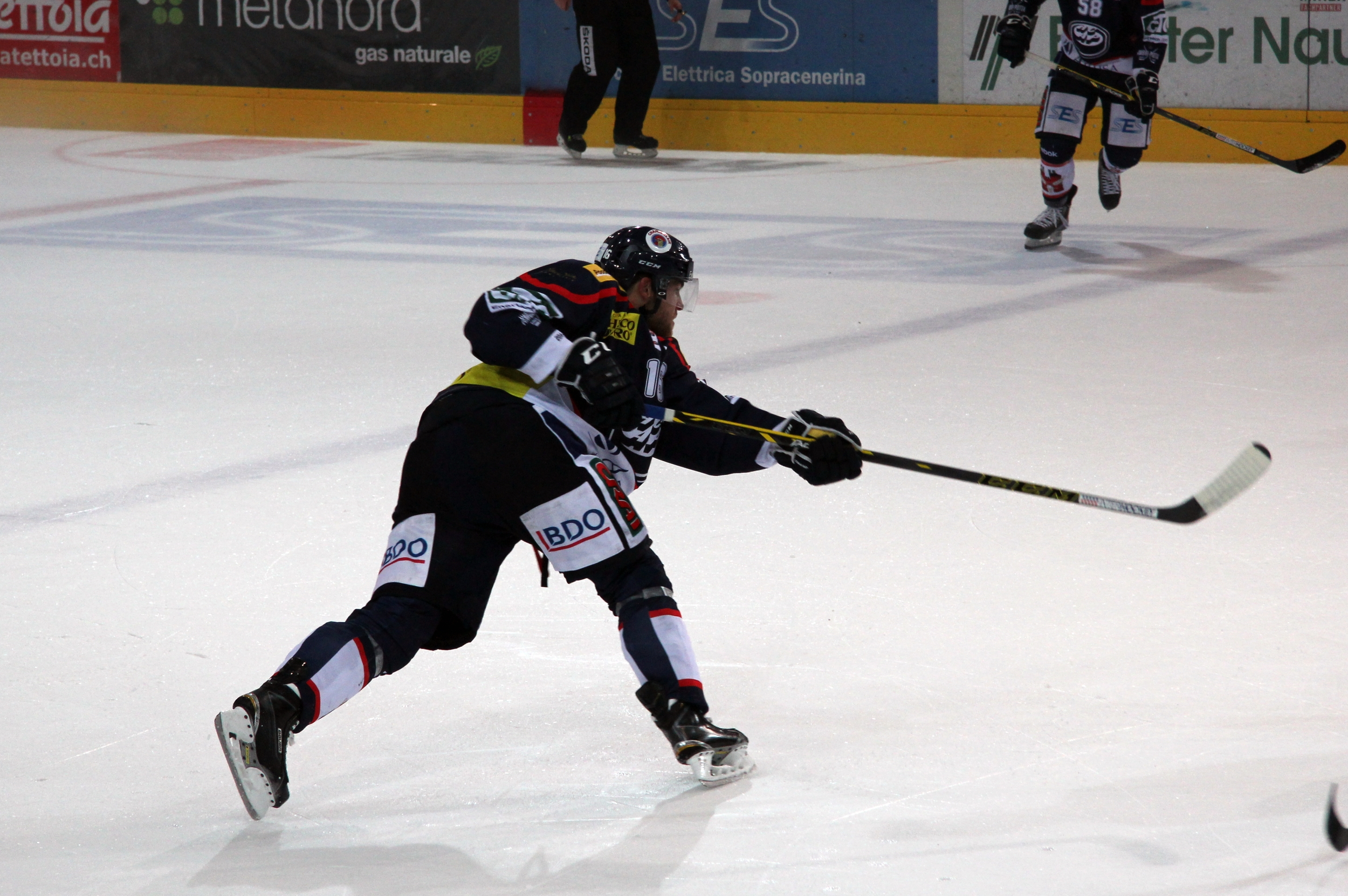
- Born: July 29, 1985 (age 41) Nelson, British Columbia, Canada
- Height: 6 ft 0 in (183 cm)
- Weight: 195 lb (88 kg; 13 st 13 lb)
- Position: Defence
- Shoots: Left
- team Former teams: Free Agent; Tampa Bay Lightning; HC Plzeň; SC Bern; HC Ambrì-Piotta; KHL Medveščak Zagreb; Admiral Vladivostok; Neftekhimik Nizhnekamsk; Kunlun Red Star; Torpedo Nizhny Novgorod; Severstal Cherepovets
- NHL draft: Undrafted
- Playing career: 2008–present
Medal record
Ice hockey
Representing Canada
Spengler Cup
Gold medal – first place	2012 Davos

Geoffrey Kenneth Kinrade (born July 29, 1985) is a Canadian professional ice hockey player. He is currently an unrestricted free agent who most recently played under contract with Severstal Cherepovets of the Kontinental Hockey League (KHL). He is a previous member of the SC Bern team of the Swiss Nationaliga A, as well as for HC Plzeň 1929 of the Czech Extraliga and the Tampa Bay Lightning of the National Hockey League (NHL). Kinrade has played one game in the NHL. He has two brothers, one of whom is Mike Kinrade, the professional free-ride mountain biker.

== Playing career ==
Born in Nelson, British Columbia, Kinrade played junior hockey with the Cowichan Valley Capitals of the British Columbia Hockey League. He then attended Michigan Tech until 2009. He played ten games with the Norfolk Admirals after his college season was over in 2009. He made his NHL debut on April 9, 2009 for Tampa against the Washington Capitals. On July 10, 2009 he signed a one-year, two-way contract with the Ottawa Senators. Kinrade played two seasons with Binghamton after that, capping his time in Binghamton with a Calder Cup championship in 2011.

After the 2010–11 season, Kinrade signed with HC Plzen 1929 of the Czech Extraliga. Mid-season he moved to SC Bern of the Swiss Nationaliga A. In December 2012, Kinrade was a member of Team Canada winning the Spengler Cup in Davos, Switzerland. At the end of the 2012-13 season, SC Bern won the Swiss National Championship.

On June 1, 2017, Kinrade continued his career in the KHL, signing a one-year deal with Chinese outfit, Kunlun Red Star. He made 26 appearances with Kunlun before he left the club in a trade to Torpedo Nizhny Novgorod on November 16, 2017.

As a free agent into the 2018–19 season, Kinrade belatedly signed a one-year contract to continue in the KHL with Severstal Cherepovets on December 27, 2018.

== Career statistics ==
			Regular season					Playoffs
Season	Team	League	GP	G	A	Pts	PIM	GP	G	A	Pts	PIM
2003–04	Cowichan Valley Capitals	BCHL	48	2	3	5	34	6	1	2	3	4
2004–05	Cowichan Valley Capitals	BCHL	60	13	21	34	49	—	—	—	—	—
2005–06	Michigan Tech	WCHA	33	1	6	7	46	—	—	—	—	—
2006–07	Michigan Tech	WCHA	40	5	14	19	30	—	—	—	—	—
2007–08	Michigan Tech	WCHA	39	5	14	19	30	—	—	—	—	—
2008–09	Michigan Tech	WCHA	38	3	13	16	18	—	—	—	—	—
2008–09	Norfolk Admirals	AHL	10	1	3	4	12	—	—	—	—	—
2008–09	Tampa Bay Lightning	NHL	1	0	0	0	0	—	—	—	—	—
2009–10	Binghamton Senators	AHL	76	7	20	27	59	—	—	—	—	—
2010–11	Binghamton Senators	AHL	78	6	19	25	43	23	1	4	5	6
2011–12	HC Plzeň	CZE	34	1	4	5	65	—	—	—	—	—
2011–12	SC Bern	NLA	7	0	4	4	35	17	0	3	3	8
2012–13	SC Bern	NLA	50	8	12	20	69	19	3	6	9	6
2013–14	SC Bern	NLA	48	6	17	23	57	—	—	—	—	—
2014–15	HC Ambrì-Piotta	NLA	5	0	3	3	4	—	—	—	—	—
2014–15	KHL Medveščak Zagreb	KHL	39	0	11	11	18	—	—	—	—	—
2015–16	KHL Medveščak Zagreb	KHL	43	6	8	14	19	—	—	—	—	—
2015–16	Admiral Vladivostok	KHL	17	1	5	6	16	5	0	1	1	0
2016–17	HC Neftekhimik Nizhnekamsk	KHL	35	6	10	16	53	—	—	—	—	—
2017–18	Kunlun Red Star	KHL	26	2	2	4	18	—	—	—	—	—
2017–18	Torpedo Nizhny Novgorod	KHL	20	3	7	10	12	4	0	1	1	2
2018–19	Severstal Cherepovets	KHL	17	3	4	7	12	—	—	—	—	—
2019–20	Severstal Cherepovets	KHL	18	2	2	4	4	—	—	—	—	—
NHL totals			1	0	0	0	0	—	—	—	—	—
KHL totals			215	23	49	72	152	9	0	2	2	2

== See also ==
- List of players who played only one game in the NHL
