= Nathan Perkovich =

Croatian American ice hockey player

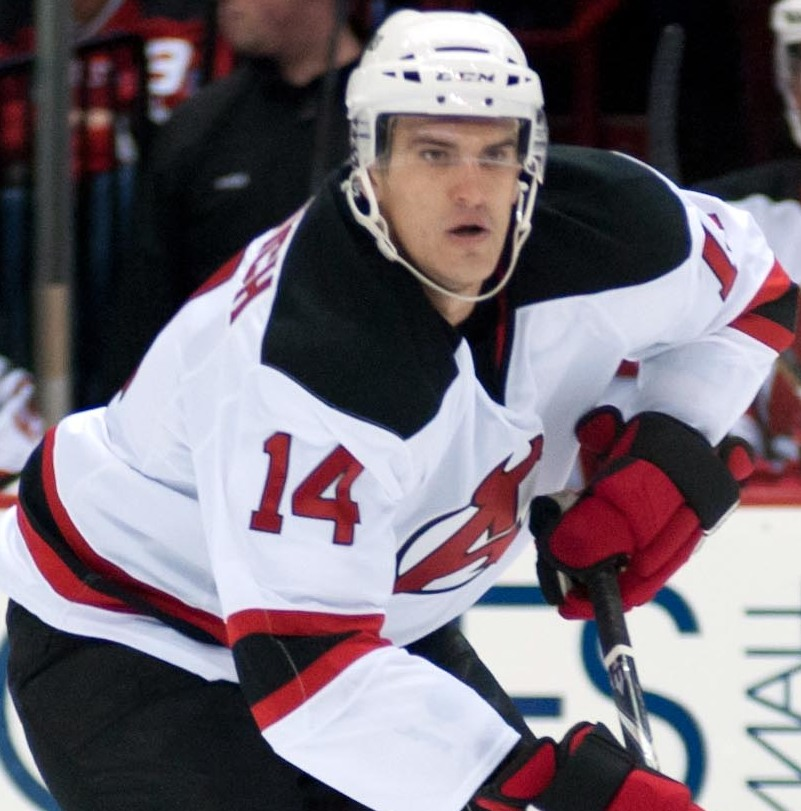
- Perkovich with the Albany Devils in 2011
- Born: October 15, 1985 (age 40) Canton, Michigan, U.S.
- Height: 6 ft 5 in (196 cm)
- Weight: 216 lb (98 kg; 15 st 6 lb)
- Position: Forward
- Shot: Right
- Played for: Lowell Devils; Albany Devils; KHL Medveščak Zagreb; Újpesti TE
- National team: Croatia
- NHL draft: 250th overall, 2004; New Jersey Devils
- Playing career: 2009–2022

Nathan Perkovich (born October 15, 1985) is a Croatian-American former professional ice hockey player. He was selected by the New Jersey Devils in the 8th round (250th overall) of the 2004 NHL entry draft. In 2015, Perkovich played for the Croatian national team at the IIHF World Championship Division I.

== Playing career ==
Before turning professional, Perkovich played three years at NCAA Division 1 Lake Superior State University, in Sault Sainte Marie, MI.

Approaching his seventh season with Croatian club, KHL Medveščak Zagreb, he began the second season of their return from the Kontinental Hockey League to the EBEL, before returning to North America after securing a one-year contract for the 2018–19 season with the Florida Everblades of the ECHL on October 18, 2018.

On August 5, 2019, the Greenville Swamp Rabbits of the ECHL announced that Perkovich had signed a standard player contract for the 2019–20 season. As a veteran for the Swamp Rabbits, Perkovich improved upon his previous season totals, recording 27 assists and 46 points in 58 regular season games before the remainder of the season was cancelled due to the COVID-19 pandemic.

Having left the Swamp Rabbits after his contract expired, Perkovich continued in the ECHL by agreeing to terms with the Jacksonville Icemen on August 25, 2020. He made a solitary appearance with the Icemen before securing a contract abroad with Hungarian club, Újpesti TE of the Erste Liga, on January 19, 2021.

He returned to the Florida Everblades for the 2021–22 season, where he won the Kelly Cup.

== Career statistics ==
=== Regular season and playoffs ===
			Regular season					Playoffs
Season	Team	League	GP	G	A	Pts	PIM	GP	G	A	Pts	PIM
2003–04	Cedar Rapids RoughRiders	USHL	35	1	7	8	23	4	1	0	1	0
2004–05	Chicago Steel	USHL	37	6	2	8	55	7	2	2	4	4
2005–06	Chicago Steel	USHL	56	28	24	52	121	—	—	—	—	—
2006–07	Lake Superior State University	CCHA	42	15	7	22	59	—	—	—	—	—
2007–08	Lake Superior State University	CCHA	36	17	8	25	52	—	—	—	—	—
2008–09	Lake Superior State University	CCHA	35	12	12	24	68	—	—	—	—	—
2008–09	Trenton Devils	ECHL	—	—	—	—	—	6	1	3	4	4
2009–10	Lowell Devils	AHL	68	19	14	33	81	5	0	1	1	0
2010–11	Albany Devils	AHL	40	8	9	17	59	—	—	—	—	—
2011–12	Albany Devils	AHL	53	10	9	19	49	—	—	—	—	—
2012–13	KHL Medveščak Zagreb	AUT	48	12	21	33	89	5	1	1	2	0
2012–13	KHL Medveščak Zagreb II	CRO	—	—	—	—	—	1	0	0	0	4
2013–14	KHL Medveščak Zagreb	KHL	14	1	0	1	6	—	—	—	—	—
2013–14	KHL Medveščak Zagreb II	CRO	—	—	—	—	—	4	6	7	13	0
2014–15	KHL Medveščak Zagreb	KHL	50	4	1	5	78	—	—	—	—	—
2014–15	KHL Medveščak Zagreb II	CRO	—	—	—	—	—	5	5	4	9	2
2015–16	KHL Medveščak Zagreb	KHL	44	2	5	7	105	—	—	—	—	—
2015–16	KHL Medveščak Zagreb II	CRO	—	—	—	—	—	2	0	1	1	0
2016–17	KHL Medveščak Zagreb	KHL	49	1	4	5	46	—	—	—	—	—
2016–17	KHL Medveščak Zagreb II	SVN	1	1	1	2	0	—	—	—	—	—
2016–17	KHL Medveščak Zagreb II	CRO	—	—	—	—	—	3	3	3	6	16
2017–18	KHL Medveščak Zagreb	AUT	7	0	5	5	12	—	—	—	—	—
2018–19	KHL Medveščak Zagreb	AUT	7	0	0	0	15	—	—	—	—	—
2018–19	Florida Everblades	ECHL	59	22	12	34	92	14	1	7	8	28
2019–20	Greenville Swamp Rabbits	ECHL	58	19	27	46	73	—	—	—	—	—
2020–21	Jacksonville Icemen	ECHL	1	0	0	0	0	—	—	—	—	—
2020–21	Újpesti TE	EL	11	5	6	11	0	5	0	0	0	0
2021–22	Florida Everblades	ECHL	55	16	7	23	105	4	0	0	0	2
ECHL totals			173	57	46	103	270	18	1	7	8	30
AHL totals			161	37	32	69	189	5	0	1	1	0
KHL totals			157	8	10	18	235	—	—	—	—	—

=== International ===
Year	Team	Event	Result	GP	G	A	Pts	PIM
2015	Croatia	WC D1B	26th	5	4	2	6	18
2016	Croatia	WC D1B	26th	5	2	1	3	6
2017	Croatia	WC D1B	27th	5	0	3	3	10
Senior totals				15	6	6	12	34
