= Michael Schiechl =

Austrian ice hockey player

- Schiechl in 2026
- Born: January 20, 1989 (age 37) Judenburg, Austria
- Height: 5 ft 11 in (180 cm)
- Weight: 203 lb (92 kg; 14 st 7 lb)
- Position: Forward
- Shoots: Left
- ICEHL team Former teams: Graz99ers; EC Red Bull Salzburg; Vienna Capitals
- National team: Austria
- Playing career: 2008–present

Michael Schiechl (born January 29, 1989) is an Austrian professional ice hockey player who is currently playing with the Graz99ers of the ICE Hockey League (ICEHL).

On May 5, 2014, Schiechl signed a two-year contract extension to continue with the Vienna Capitals. At the conclusion of his contract with the Capitals, Schiechl opted to return to Salzburg signing a one-year deal on August 19, 2016.

He participated at the 2011 IIHF World Championship as a member of the Austria men's national ice hockey team.
