= Geoff Waugh =

Canadian-Croatian ice hockey player

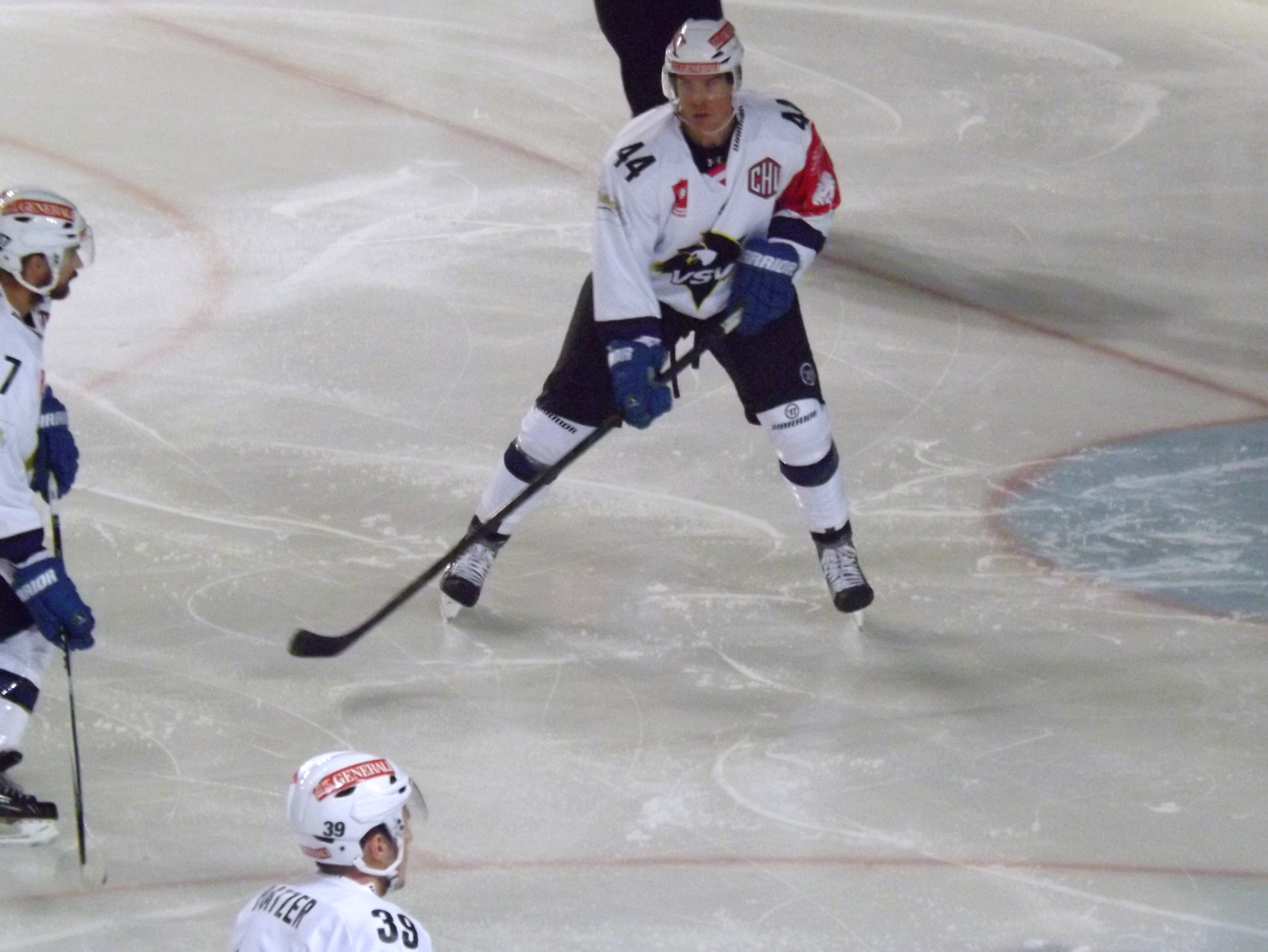
- Born: August 25, 1983 (age 43) Winnipeg, Manitoba, Canada
- Height: 6 ft 4 in (193 cm)
- Weight: 216 lb (98 kg; 15 st 6 lb)
- Position: Defence
- Shot: Right
- Played for: Springfield Falcons; Binghamton Senators; Portland Pirates; Manitoba Moose; KHL Medveščak Zagreb; EC VSV; Nottingham Panthers
- National team: Croatia
- NHL draft: 78th overall, 2002; Dallas Stars
- Playing career: 2006–2017

Geoff Waugh (born August 25, 1983) is a retired Canadian-Croatian ice hockey defenceman who last played for the Nottingham Panthers of the Elite Ice Hockey League (EIHL).

== Playing career ==
He played Junior "A" hockey for the Kindersley Klippers of the Saskatchewan Junior Hockey League from 2001 to 2003. The Dallas Stars chose him 78th overall in the 2002 NHL entry draft.

Waugh then joined the Northern Michigan Wildcats of the NCAA for four years. In 2006-07 he turned pro with the Springfield Falcons and the Johnstown Chiefs.

He then signed as a free agent with the Ottawa Senators in 2008 and played for two seasons with their farm teams the Binghamton Senators and the Elmira Jackals. He played for the Portland Pirates, Manitoba Moose, and the Victoria Salmon Kings until 2011, when he joined KHL Medveščak Zagreb of the then EBEL.

After three seasons within Zagreb, including an injury-hit inaugural season in the Kontinental Hockey League. The now Croatian citizen, opted to return to the EBEL, signing with Austrian club EC VSV on June 15, 2014.

On June 2, 2015, Waugh left Austria as a free agent and signed a one-year deal with British club, the Nottingham Panthers of the EIHL.

== Career statistics ==
=== Regular season and playoffs ===
| | | | Regular season | | | | | Playoffs |
| Season | Team | League | GP | G | A | Pts | PIM | GP | G | A | Pts | PIM |
|---|---|---|---|---|---|---|---|---|---|---|---|---|
| 2000–01 | Kindersley Klippers | SJHL | 57 | 2 | 5 | 7 | 74 | — | — | — | — | — |
| 2001–02 | Kindersley Klippers | SJHL | 62 | 4 | 21 | 25 | 125 | 18 | 0 | 8 | 8 | 59 |
| 2002–03 | Northern Michigan University | CCHA | 39 | 0 | 7 | 7 | 41 | — | — | — | — | — |
| 2003–04 | Northern Michigan University | CCHA | 41 | 2 | 13 | 15 | 72 | — | — | — | — | — |
| 2004–05 | Northern Michigan University | CCHA | 39 | 2 | 8 | 10 | 89 | — | — | — | — | — |
| 2005–06 | Northern Michigan University | CCHA | 39 | 0 | 7 | 7 | 74 | — | — | — | — | — |
| 2006–07 | Springfield Falcons | AHL | 10 | 0 | 0 | 0 | 25 | — | — | — | — | — |
| 2006–07 | Johnstown Chiefs | ECHL | 56 | 1 | 12 | 13 | 91 | 2 | 1 | 0 | 1 | 4 |
| 2007–08 | Binghamton Senators | AHL | 71 | 3 | 3 | 6 | 139 | — | — | — | — | — |
| 2008–09 | Binghamton Senators | AHL | 27 | 0 | 2 | 2 | 23 | — | — | — | — | — |
| 2008–09 | Elmira Jackals | ECHL | 1 | 0 | 0 | 0 | 7 | — | — | — | — | — |
| 2008–09 | Portland Pirates | AHL | 13 | 0 | 1 | 1 | 33 | 2 | 0 | 0 | 0 | 2 |
| 2009–10 | Manitoba Moose | AHL | 29 | 0 | 1 | 1 | 41 | — | — | — | — | — |
| 2010–11 | Manitoba Moose | AHL | 2 | 0 | 0 | 0 | 4 | — | — | — | — | — |
| 2010–11 | Victoria Salmon Kings | ECHL | 57 | 3 | 8 | 11 | 82 | 12 | 0 | 3 | 3 | 10 |
| 2011–12 | KHL Medveščak Zagreb | AUT | 45 | 3 | 6 | 9 | 122 | 8 | 0 | 1 | 1 | 33 |
| 2011–12 | KHL Medveščak Zagreb II | CRO | — | — | — | — | — | 3 | 2 | 0 | 2 | 2 |
| 2012–13 | KHL Medveščak Zagreb | AUT | 42 | 3 | 6 | 9 | 100 | 2 | 0 | 0 | 0 | 4 |
| 2013–14 | KHL Medveščak Zagreb | KHL | 4 | 0 | 0 | 0 | 2 | — | — | — | — | — |
| 2013–14 | KHL Medveščak Zagreb II | CRO | — | — | — | — | — | 5 | 2 | 2 | 4 | 2 |
| 2014–15 | EC VSV | AUT | 42 | 5 | 4 | 9 | 31 | 5 | 0 | 0 | 0 | 5 |
| 2015–16 | Nottingham Panthers | EIHL | 44 | 6 | 13 | 19 | 45 | 4 | 0 | 1 | 1 | 0 |
| 2016–17 | Nottingham Panthers | EIHL | 31 | 3 | 2 | 5 | 16 | 2 | 0 | 1 | 1 | 0 |
| AHL totals | | | 152 | 3 | 7 | 10 | 265 | 2 | 0 | 0 | 0 | 2 |
| ECHL totals | | | 114 | 4 | 20 | 24 | 180 | 14 | 1 | 3 | 4 | 14 |
| AUT totals | | | 129 | 11 | 16 | 27 | 253 | 15 | 0 | 1 | 1 | 42 |

=== International ===
| Year | Team | Event | GP | G | A | Pts | PIM |
|---|---|---|---|---|---|---|---|
| 2014 | Croatia | WC D1B | 5 | 1 | 1 | 2 | 2 |
| 2015 | Croatia | WC D1B | 3 | 0 | 2 | 2 | 14 |
| Senior totals | | | 8 | 1 | 3 | 4 | 16 |
