= Zoltán Hetényi =

Hungarian ice hockey player

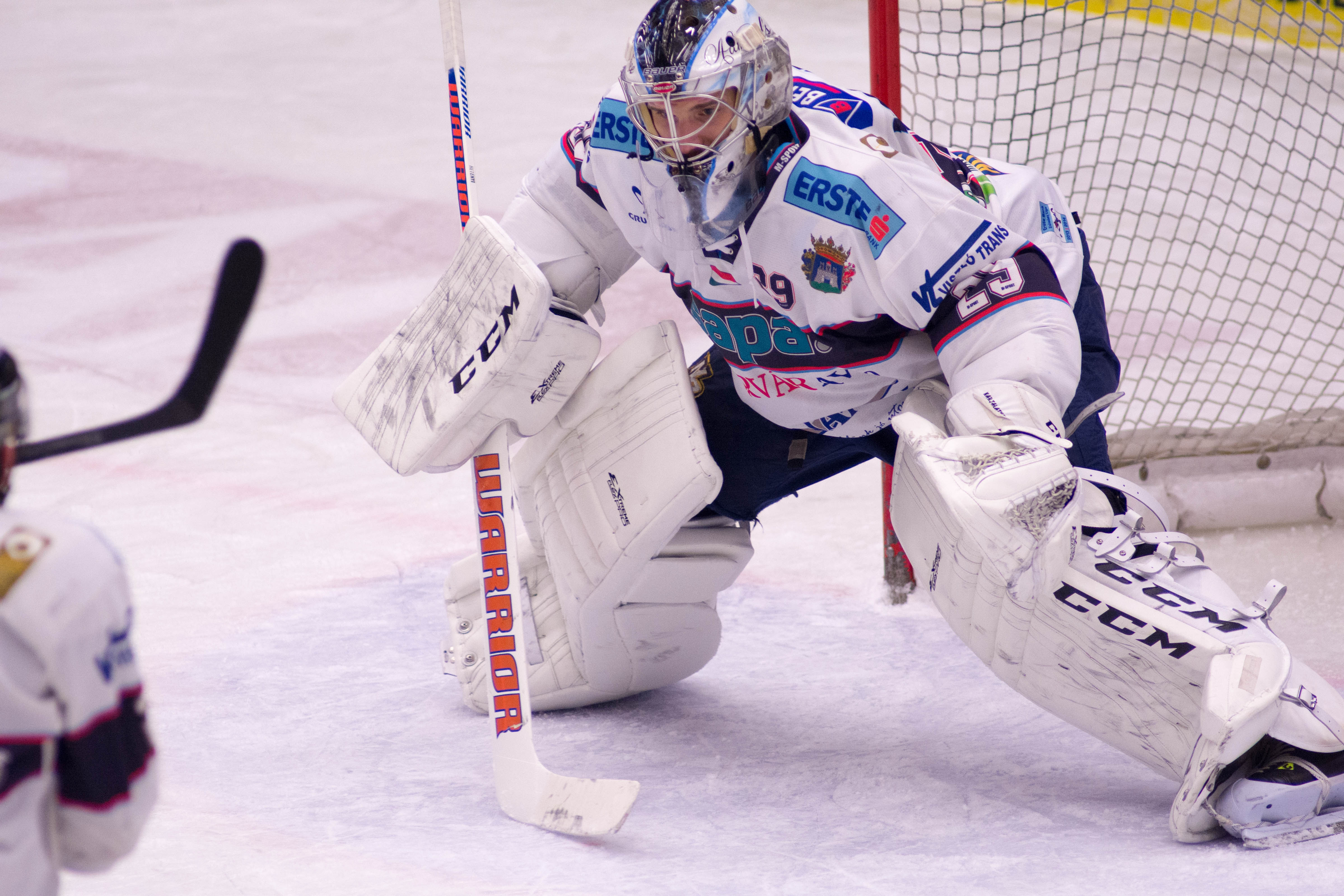
- Born: 18 February 1988 (age 37) Budapest, Hungary
- Height: 6 ft 2 in (188 cm)
- Weight: 190 lb (86 kg; 13 st 8 lb)
- Position: Goaltender
- Catches: Left
- Erste team Former teams: DEAC; Fehérvár AV19; Jokerit; Cincinnati Cyclones; Orlando Solar Bears; Greenville Swamp Rabbits
- National team: Hungary
- NHL draft: Undrafted
- Playing career: 2003–present

Zoltán Laszolo Hetényi (born 18 February 1988 in Budapest) is a Hungarian ice hockey goaltender who plays for Debreceni EAC in the Erste Liga.

== Playing career ==
Hetényi began playing hockey by Dunaferr. After coming through the youth ranks of the team, he switched to Ferencvárosi TC and later Alba Volán Székesfehérvár, making his debut for the Hungarian champions in 2004.

The breakthrough in his career came in the 2007–2008 season, when thanks to his outstanding performances, he managed to supplant first choice keeper Krisztián Budai. In addition, he earned a place in the Hungarian team, that went undefeated on the 2008 IIHF World Championship Division I and won promotion to the top level championship after seventy years. Hetényi contributed to the success with a shutout against Croatia.

Alongside other three Hungarians, he was listed for the 2009 KHL entry draft, but in the end he was not picked by any club.

In 2010 he travelled to Slovenia for the Division I World Championship already as the starting goalie of the national team, and despite Hungary missed out the promotion after falling short to the hosts, Hetényi topped the goalkeepers' list both in GAA (1.29) and in saving percentage (.954), making two shutouts in the process.

For the 2011–12 season, Hetényi joined the Finnish team Jokerit of the league SM-liiga. In the 2012–13 season, Hetenyi spent a season in North America in the ECHL with the Cincinnati Cyclones and the Orlando Solar Bears. Unable to establish himself on the ice and making headlines off the ice, Hetenyi opted to return to Europe in signing with Tappara Tampere of the Finnish Liiga.

During the 2013–14 season, after playing on loan in the Mestis with LeKi, and unable to make an appearance with Tappara, Hetenyi made a return to familiar surroundings in his original club, Alba Volán Székesfehérvár on 19 November 2013.

In October 2017, Hetenyi was signed by Head Coach Jeff Carr of the Knoxville Ice Bears (Southern Professional Hockey League).

== Personal life ==
He has a brother, Péter (b. 1991) who is also a professional ice hockey player, playing as a defender. In 2013 whilst in North America Hetényi was arrested for drunken misbehavior in an Atlanta restaurant.

== Achievements ==
- Hungarian Championship:
  - Winner: 2005, 2006, 2007, 2008, 2009, 2010, 2011
- IIHF World Championship Division I:
  - Winner: 2008

== Awards and recognition ==
- Hungarian Championship Rookie of the Year: 2004
- Best Junior Player of the Hungarian Championship: 2005, 2006
- Best Goaltender of the Hungarian Championship Playoffs: 2008
