= Alan Letang =

Canadian-Croatian ice hockey player

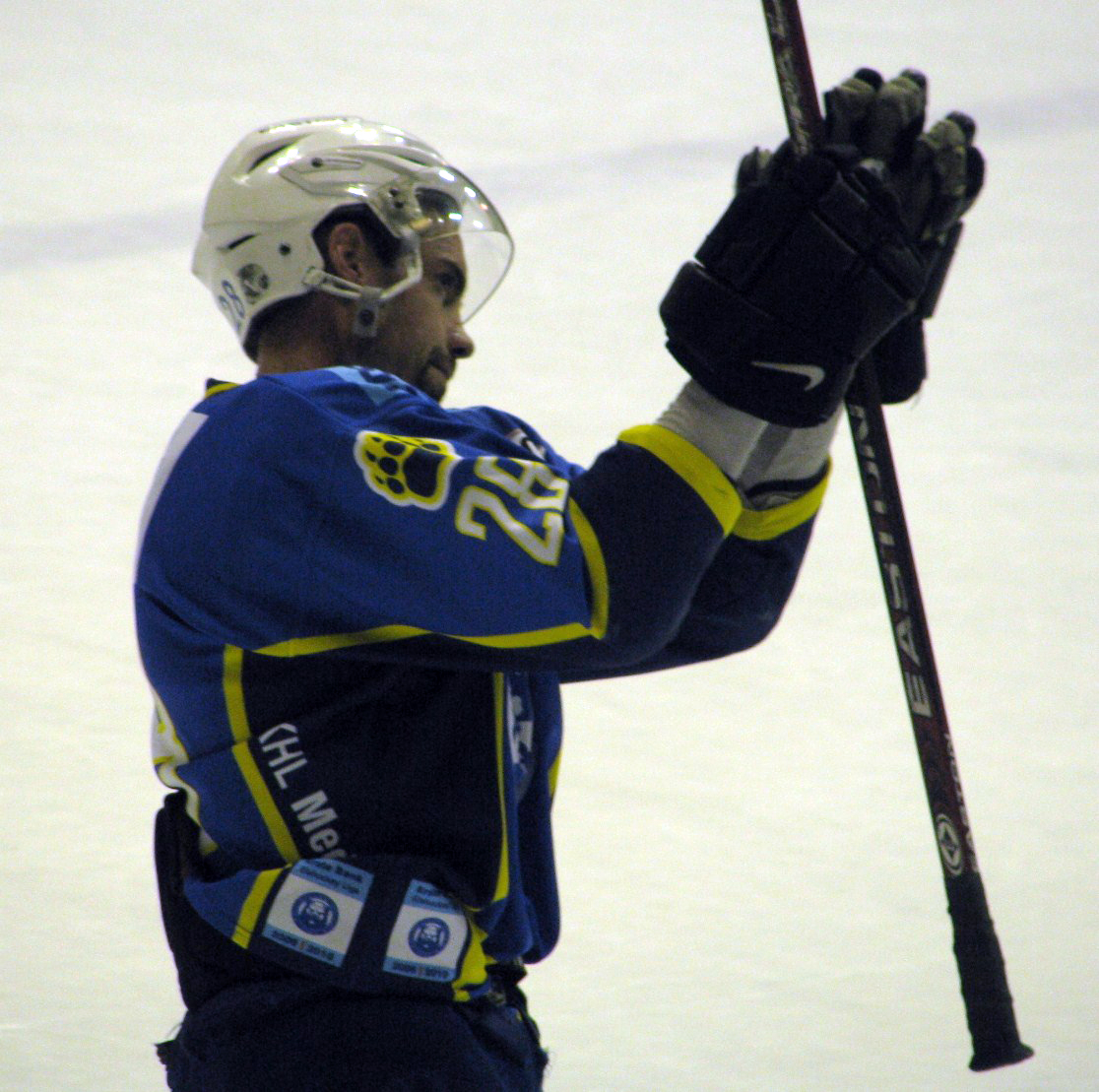
- Born: September 4, 1975 (age 51) Renfrew, Ontario, Canada
- Height: 6 ft 1 in (185 cm)
- Weight: 187 lb (85 kg; 13 st 5 lb)
- Position: Defence
- Shot: Left
- Played for: Dallas Stars; Calgary Flames; New York Islanders
- National team: Canada and Croatia
- NHL draft: 203rd overall, 1993; Montreal Canadiens
- Playing career: 1995–2014

Alan Letang (born September 4, 1975) is a Canadian-Croatian former professional ice hockey player. In 2021, he was named the head coach for the Sarnia Sting of the Ontario Hockey League.

== Playing career ==
Letang was drafted by the Montreal Canadiens in the 8th round, 203rd overall in the 1993 NHL entry draft. He has played 14 games in the National Hockey League for the Dallas Stars, Calgary Flames and New York Islanders.

Letang played for the Hamburg Freezers of the German Deutsche Eishockey Liga (DEL) from 2004 to 2007, before joining fellow DEL outfit Nürnberg Ice Tigers for the 2007–08 season. In 2008–09, he played in Austria with HC TWK Innsbruck.

For the 2009–10 season, Letang signed with Croatian club KHL Medveščak Zagreb on June 18, 2009. As captain of Medveščak, Alan scored 10 goals and 19 assists for 29 points in 50 games to finish second among defensemen on the team. After leading KHL to the second round of the EBEL playoffs, Letang signed a two-year contract extension to remain with KHL Medveščak Zagreb on March 20, 2010. He eventually played for the Zagreb team until he retired in 2014.

== Coaching career ==
On July 22, 2014, Letang announced that he has ended his playing career, but would stay at KHL Medveščak Zagreb as an assistant coach. After two years on the Zagreb coaching staff and a total of seven seasons with the club, Letang headed back to his native Canada and was named assistant coach of the Owen Sound Attack of the Ontario Hockey League (OHL) on June 21, 2016. On January 28, 2019, Letang was named interim coach of the Owen Sound Attack before having the interim tag removed. He left the Attack in 2021 to become the head coach of the OHL's Sarnia Sting. In 2023, Letang was named head coach of Team Canada in the 2024 IIHF World Junior Championship.

== Career statistics ==
=== Regular season and playoffs ===
			Regular season					Playoffs
Season	Team	League	GP	G	A	Pts	PIM	GP	G	A	Pts	PIM
1991–92	Cornwall Royals	OHL	47	1	4	5	16	6	0	0	0	2
1992–93	Newmarket Royals	OHL	66	1	25	26	14	6	0	3	3	2
1993–94	Newmarket Royals	OHL	58	3	21	24	30	—	—	—	—	—
1994–95	Sarnia Sting	OHL	62	5	36	41	35	4	2	2	4	6
1995–96	Fredericton Canadiens	AHL	71	0	26	26	40	10	0	3	3	4
1996–97	Fredericton Canadiens	AHL	60	2	9	11	8	—	—	—	—	—
1997–98	Kaufbeurer Adler	DEL	15	1	5	6	8	—	—	—	—	—
1997–98	SCL Tigers	NLA	11	4	3	7	6	—	—	—	—	—
1997–98	Augsburger Panther	DEL	17	0	1	1	4	—	—	—	—	—
1998–99	Canadian National Team	Intl	42	3	9	12	20	—	—	—	—	—
1998–99	EV Zug	NLA	—	—	—	—	—	9	0	4	4	4
1998–99	Michigan K-Wings	IHL	12	3	3	6	0	5	0	2	2	0
1999–00	Michigan K-Wings	IHL	51	1	12	13	30	—	—	—	—	—
1999–00	Dallas Stars	NHL	8	0	0	0	2	—	—	—	—	—
2000–01	Utah Grizzlies	IHL	79	6	24	30	26	—	—	—	—	—
2001–02	Saint John Flames	AHL	61	4	24	28	33	—	—	—	—	—
2001–02	Calgary Flames	NHL	2	0	0	0	0	—	—	—	—	—
2002–03	Bridgeport Sound Tigers	AHL	70	3	21	24	21	8	1	0	1	0
2002–03	New York Islanders	NHL	4	0	0	0	0	—	—	—	—	—
2003–04	Bridgeport Sound Tigers	AHL	76	1	13	14	18	7	1	1	2	4
2004–05	Hamburg Freezers	DEL	42	1	9	10	20	5	0	1	1	4
2005–06	Hamburg Freezers	DEL	52	4	9	13	34	6	0	3	3	2
2006–07	Hamburg Freezers	DEL	51	3	19	22	32	2	0	1	1	2
2007–08	Sinupret Ice Tigers	DEL	11	0	0	0	2	5	0	0	0	6
2008–09	HC TWK Innsbruck	EBEL	48	5	13	18	40	6	0	3	3	26
2009–10	KHL Medveščak	EBEL	50	10	19	29	36	11	3	2	5	10
2010–11	KHL Medveščak	EBEL	46	5	14	19	20	—	—	—	—	—
2011–12	KHL Medveščak	EBEL	48	5	15	20	28	9	2	2	4	8
2012–13	KHL Medveščak	EBEL	46	1	18	19	38	6	0	0	0	0
AHL totals			338	10	93	103	120	25	2	4	6	8
NHL totals			14	0	0	0	2	—	—	—	—	—
