= Dario Kostović =

Swiss-Croatian ice hockey player

- Born: August 8, 1980 (age 44); Split, Croatia
- Height: 6 ft 3 in (191 cm)
- Weight: 205 lb (93 kg; 14 st 9 lb)
- Shot: Right
- Played for: Kloten Flyers; HC Ambri-Piotta; HC Lugano; ZSC Lions; KHL Medveščak Zagreb
- National team: Croatia
- NHL draft: Undrafted
- Playing career: 1999–2015

Dario Kostovic (born August 8, 1980) is a Swiss-Croatian former professional ice hockey player who last played for KHL Medveščak Zagreb of the Kontinental Hockey League (KHL). He took up a head coaching position in the Swiss Junior Elite B league upon completing his professional career in the 2014–15 season.

== Career statistics ==
			Regular season					Playoffs
Season	Team	League	GP	G	A	Pts	PIM	GP	G	A	Pts	PIM
1996–97	EHC Kloten U20	Elite Jr. A	28	5	7	12	6	—	—	—	—	—
1997–98	EHC Kloten U20	Elite Jr. A	23	6	7	13	8	—	—	—	—	—
1998–99	EHC Kloten U20	Elite Jr. A	5	0	1	1	0	—	—	—	—	—
1999–00	EHC Kloten U20	Elite Jr. A	17	7	15	22	18	4	3	2	5	2
1999–00	EHC Kloten	NLA	23	0	0	0	4	2	0	0	0	0
2000–01	Kloten Flyers	NLA	43	4	5	9	22	9	1	0	1	6
2000–01	HC Thurgau	NLB	2	1	0	1	4	—	—	—	—	—
2001–02	Kloten Flyers	NLA	39	2	2	4	55	7	1	1	2	2
2002–03	Kloten Flyers	NLA	38	7	5	12	74	5	1	0	1	8
2003–04	Kloten Flyers	NLA	12	0	1	1	4	—	—	—	—	—
2004–05	Kloten Flyers	NLA	35	1	3	4	26	—	—	—	—	—
2005–06	Lausanne HC	NLB	39	17	6	23	100	12	1	3	4	18
2006–07	HC Ambrì-Piotta	NLA	42	11	8	19	24	—	—	—	—	—
2007–08	HC Lugano	NLA	34	2	1	3	31	5	0	0	0	0
2007–08	EHC Chur	NLB	1	0	0	0	0	—	—	—	—	—
2008–09	HC Lugano	NLA	50	4	9	13	24	6	0	0	0	4
2009–10	HC Lugano	NLA	21	0	2	2	6	—	—	—	—	—
2009–10	ZSC Lions	NLA	26	2	3	5	14	3	0	0	0	2
2010–11	HC Lugano	NLA	44	2	3	5	41	—	—	—	—	—
2011–12	Medvescak Zagreb	EBEL	46	5	5	10	75	9	0	1	1	14
2011–12	Medvescak Zagreb II	Croatia	—	—	—	—	—	3	1	1	2	0
2012–13	Medvescak Zagreb	EBEL	47	7	3	10	72	6	0	0	0	4
2012–13	Medvescak Zagreb II	Croatia	—	—	—	—	—	1	0	1	1	14
2013–14	Medvescak Zagreb	KHL	4	0	2	2	4	—	—	—	—	—
2013–14	Medvescak Zagreb II	Croatia	—	—	—	—	—	4	2	4	6	4
2014–15	Medvescak Zagreb	KHL	12	0	0	0	4	—	—	—	—	—
2014–15	Medvescak Zagreb II	Croatia	1	1	0	1	0	5	0	0	0	2
NLA totals			407	35	42	77	325	37	3	1	4	22
